= Rodney Saulsberry =

American actor

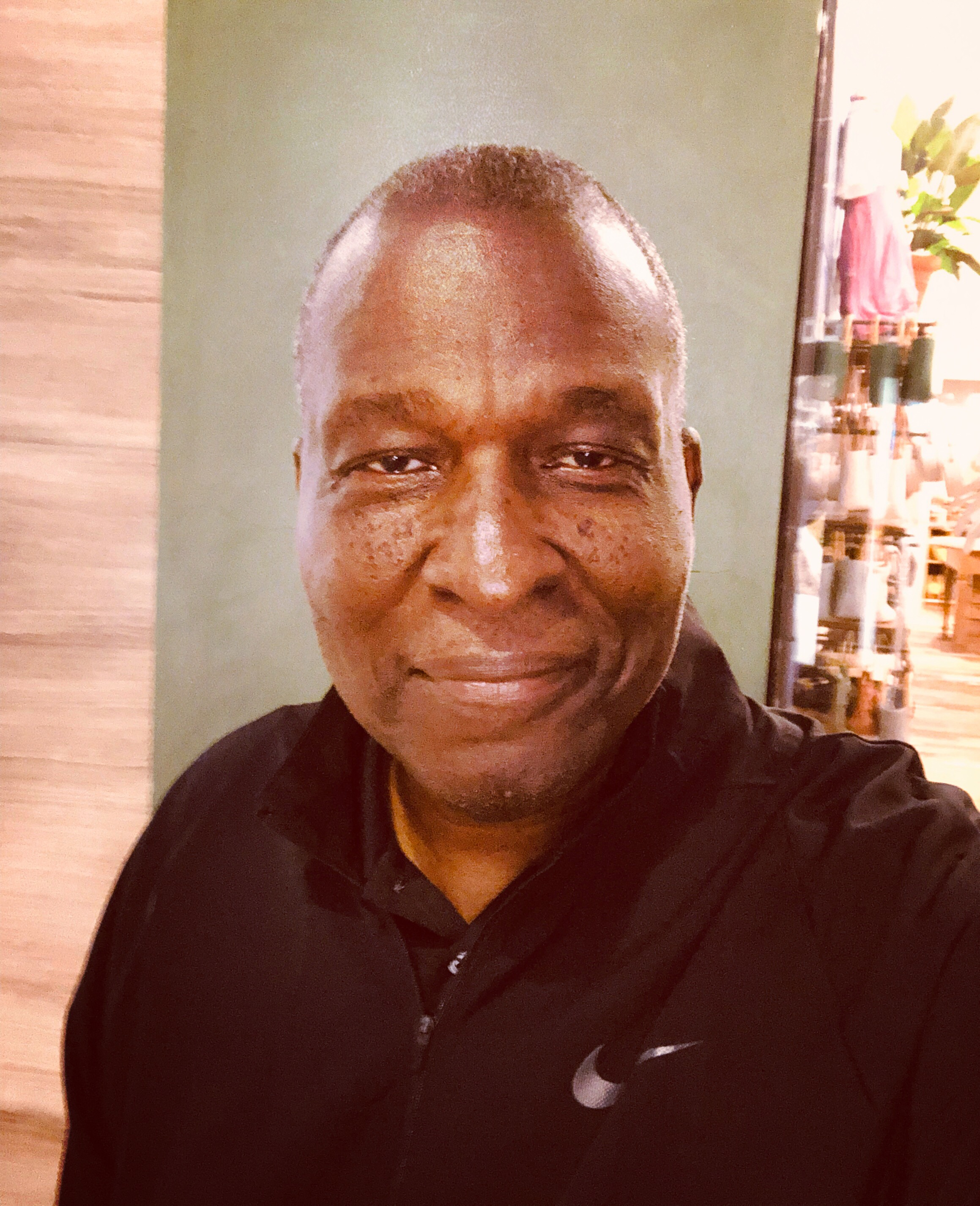
- Saulsberry in Glendale, California
- Occupations: Voice-over artist; actor; vocalist; announcer; author
- Years active: 1979–present
- Spouse: Helen Montgomery (m. 1980)
- Children: 1

Rodney Saulsberry is an American voice-over performer, actor, vocalist, announcer and author, known for his voice work on commercials (Twix, Zatarain's), his three books You Can Bank on Your Voice, Step Up to the Mic, Rodney Saulsberry's Tongue Twisters and Vocal Warm-Ups, the host of the popular podcast Success Talks With Rodney Saulsberry and the voice of Robbie Robertson in the 1994 animated TV series Spider-Man: The Animated Series.

Saulsberry's first R&B album Rodney Saulsberry produced two Billboard-charting singles, "I Wonder" and "Look Whatcha Done Now".

== Career ==
As an actor, Saulsberry's films include The Philadelphia Experiment (1984), Tango & Cash (1989), and the animated feature The Invincible Iron Man (2007). His voice work includes audiobooks and numerous film trailers (How Stella Got Her Groove Back, Finding Forrester, Crooklyn). He narrated the documentary Ax Handle Saturday: 50 Years Later (2010), Michael Jackson: Life of a Superstar (2009), Andy Bobrow's mockumentary The Old Negro Space Program (2004), a satire on Ken Burns' Baseball (1994), and the Marvin Gaye E! True Hollywood Story (1998). Currently, Rodney is the radio announcer voice for the New Orleans Pelicans Basketball Team 2012 Season.

Upscale Magazine regarded Saulsberry as "a voice to be reckoned with", while Black Enterprise magazine labeled him "the voice of choice for behind-the-scenes-narration".

On television, he has been seen in various guest-star roles, including the recurring role of Anthony Walker on The Bold and the Beautiful (1987) Law & Order: LA (2010) Taxi (1978), M*A*S*H (1972), Gimme a Break! (1981), 227 (1985), The A-Team (1986), Hill Street Blues (1981), Dr. Quinn, Medicine Woman (1993), Without a Trace (2002) and Monk (2002). He was a series regular in the role of Jeff Johnson on Capitol (1982).

Saulsberry, who has composed original music for several productions, created the film, television and commercial music placement website, Tomdor Music, in the fall of 2011.

== Filmography ==
=== Film ===
Year	Title	Role	Notes
1993	Look Who's Talking Now!	Dogs (voice)	
2003	The Animatrix	Chyron (voice)	Segment: "Matriculated"
2006	The Invincible Iron Man	Jim Rhodes (voice)	Direct-to-video
2011	The Little Engine That Could	Freight Train, Bud (voice)	Direct-to-video

=== Television ===
Year	Title	Role	Notes
1994	Skeleton Warriors	Additional voices	11 episodes
1994–1997	Aaahh!!! Real Monsters	Ufwapo, Galoth, Hal, Stagehand (voice)	5 episodes
1994–1998	Spider-Man: The Animated Series	Robbie Robertson, additional voices	31 episodes
1999–2007	Xyber 9: New Dawn	Willy (voice)	5 episodes
2002	Rugrats	Security Guard, Harry Halibut (voice)	Episode: "The Age of Aquarium"
2003	Static Shock	Philip Rollins / Sparky (voice)	Episode: "Blast from the Past"
2003	The Electric Piper	Mr. Jones (voice)	Television film
2006	Avatar: The Last Airbender	Additional voices	Episode: "The Drill"
2006	Minoriteam	Fasto (voice)	7 episodes
2022	Snowfall	Dr. Evans	Episode: "Lying in a Hammock"
2024	Dee & Friends in Oz	Ozzie (voice)	8 episodes
2025–present	Weather Hunters	Aloysius Herbert Bingham	40 episodes

=== Video games ===
Year	Title	Role	Notes
2002	Star Trek: Starfleet Command III	Klingon Officer	
2006	Driver: Parallel Lines	Bishop	
2007	CSI: Hard Evidence	Everett Bower, Eddie Tillis	
2009	G.I. Joe: The Rise of Cobra	Heavy Duty	
2009	Grey's Anatomy: The Video Game	Richard Webber	
2011	SOCOM 4 U.S. Navy SEALs	Wells	
2013	Grand Theft Auto V	The Local Population	
2022	The Walking Dead: Saints & Sinners – Chapter 2: Retribution	Sonny	

== Public appearances ==
Saulsberry has performed on the television variety show Soul Train and was the announcer for the 34th NAACP Image Awards and the 2003 Essence Awards. He was a guest presenter at the first annual Voice 2007 in Las Vegas and a featured speaker and panelist for two consecutive years at Voice Coaches Expo in Schenectady, New York. He has taught his voice-over workshop in various locations around the country that include, New York, Chicago, Nashville, Las Vegas and Los Angeles. He has also been a guest lecturer for the Theatre Department at Western Michigan University, California State University, Northridge and the Black Theatre Festival in Winston-Salem. Saulsberry has appeared at several book-signing events, including Borders and Barnes and Noble, and he is a regular featured panelist and workshop instructor for the SAG Foundation in support of the Don LaFontaine Voice-Over Lab. Rodney was a guest on the web series VO Buzz Weekly where he performed his motivational R&B single, "Miracles" from his album, "Better Than Before."

== Discography ==
- Midnight Crossing (1988) - "Alone" (writer, performer)
- Night and the City (1992) - "Love Doesn't Matter" (performer)
- I'll Do Anything (1994) - "I'll Do Anything" (background vocals)
- The Lion King (1994) - "Hakuna Matata", "Circle of Life" (background vocals)
- Sprung (1997) - "We Are Love" (Writer, performer)
- The Prince of Egypt (1998) - "Playing with the Big Boys" (background vocals)
- Michael Jordan: An American Hero (1999) - "I'm So Glad You're Mine" (Writer, performer)
- Adventureland (2009) - "I Need to Know" (writer, performer)
- The Bold and the Beautiful (2010) - "Miracles", "I Like It Girl", "I Gotta Lot of Friends", "Love In Your Heart" (writer, performer)
- Just Another Day (2010) - "Better Than Before" (Writer, performer)
- Paranormal Activity 3 (2011) - "Who Do You Love" (writer, performer)

== Awards ==
In 2011, Saulsberry received a nomination from the 42nd NAACP Image Awards committee in the category of Outstanding Actor in a Daytime Drama Series for his role of Anthony on The Bold and the Beautiful.

In 2012, Saulsberry received a second nomination from the 44th NAACP Image Awards committee in the category of Outstanding Actor in a Daytime Drama Series for his role of Anthony on "The Bold and the Beautiful".

Saulsberry played the lead role in the Academy Award-winning short film Violet (1981).
