= List of Krapopolis episodes =

Krapopolis is an American adult animated sitcom created by Dan Harmon for the Fox Broadcasting Company. In July 2024, Fox renewed the series for a fourth season ahead of the season 2 premiere. The third season premiered on September 28, 2025.

As of April 19, 2026, 59 episodes of Krapopolis have aired, concluding the third season.

== Series overview ==
Season	Episodes	Originally released	
Season	Episodes	First released	Last released
1	23	September 24, 2023	May 19, 2024
2	22	September 29, 2024	May 18, 2025
3	13	September 28, 2025	April 19, 2026

== Episodes ==
=== Season 1 (2023–24) ===
No. overall	No. in season	Title	Directed by	Written by	Original release date	Prod. code	U.S. viewers (millions)	Rating (18-49)
1	1	"All Hail the Goddess of Likability!"	Jake Hollander	Dan Harmon	September 24, 2023	1BBDH01	3.82	1.2
Tyrannis oversees his city and is confronted by the barbaric and cannibalistic Killassians living nearby. His mother Deliria and father Shlub visit and Deliria is obsessed with people building a temple to her. Hippocampus develops a bomb and he and Stupendous attempt to give it to the Killassians in a Trojan horse. After Deliria is told by Hermes that Athena wants to talk to her and plans to get her back on Mount Olympus, Athena arrives to fight Deliria due to the Killassians worshiping Athena, but is defeated by the Trojan horse bomb. Cast: Dee Bradley Baker, Keith David as Asskill, Matt Gourley, David Pressman as Steve and Citizen #1, Michael Urie as Hermes, Kari Wahlgren as Citizen #2 and Little Boy, Amber Stevens West as Athena
2	2	"The Stuperbowl"	Otis Brayboy	Becky Mann & Audra Sielaff	September 24, 2023	1BBDH03	1.90	0.6
Tyannis starts the first series of games which is attended by other rulers Asskill, King Zika, and King Papatonis. Stupendous is among those competing the games and ends up turning the games into a competition. Meanwhile, Shlub takes Hippocampus onto the streets as an alternative to his experiments and they find that someone has been murdered as Hippocampus plans to do an autopsy to find the murderer. At the same time, Deliria works to serve some wine as Hermes informs her that Aphrodite's falcon form and Poseidon's nephew Broseidon are in attendance. Cast: Eric Bauza as King Zika and Obvious Crowd Member, Keith David as Asskill, John DiMaggio as Doubting Crowd Member, Dave Franco as Broseidon, Brandon Johnson as Mailman and Reassuring Guy, Tessa Bonham Jones as Pippa the Narrator, Maurice LaMarche as King Papatonis and Player #1, Joel McHale as Sportscaster #1, David Pressman as Blacksmith and Runner, Kevin Michael Richardson as Player #2 and Referee, Rob Riggle as Sportscaster #2, Michael Urie as Hermes, Kari Wahlgren as Petra and Woman
3	3	"Wife Swamp"	Dominic Polcino	Dan Harmon & Jordan Young	October 1, 2023	1BBDH02	1.70	0.5
Tyrannis returns from his quest on rescuing with a sea nymph named Herophile who has become his girlfriend after he saved her from a Kraken. His family learns that Herophile is the daughter of Poseidon. It is soon revealed that Deliria bribed the Kraken to take a dive. Because the Kraken didn't receive the payment he was owed, he will not leave the coasts of Krapopolis. Because of what happened, Tyrannis and Herophile head to a location called "The Swamp" that the gods won't go until Tyrannis encounters Herophile's centaur ex-boyfriend Carrots who is hiding from Poseidon. When Poseidon finds them, he makes Tyrannis and Carrots fight for Herophile's hand in marriage. Meanwhile, Shlub, Stupendous, and Hippocampus deal with a pack of wolves who are one of man's enemies. Hippocampus disguises Stupendous as a wolf with wolf urine to complete the scent in order to get close to the wolves. When that attempt fails, Stupendous finds a new way to befriend wolves. Cast: Eric Bauza as Delivery Sailor, Yvette Nicole Brown as Herophile, Daveed Diggs as Carrots, Matt Gourley as Bard and Kraken, David Koechner as Poseidon, David Pressman as Fisherman and Sculptor, Fred Tatasciore as Wolves
4	4	"Prometheus"	Patrick Kochakji	Tom Scharpling	October 8, 2023	1BBDH04	0.84	0.3
Tyrannis and Hippocampus free Prometheus from his punishment that Zeus put him in as he is revealed to have a history with Deliria. Though it is revealed that Prometheus has plans to get payback on Zeus for his eternal punishment. Meanwhile, Shlub takes Stupendous to Cyclopia to find the Cyclops that Deliria previously mated with to give birth to Stupendous. She finds her father Donny as Shlub learns the hard way to stay out of certain things. Cast: Steve Agee as Heracles, Eric Bauza as Orange-Bearded Cyclops, John DiMaggio as Donny and Traveler, Tim Robinson as Blue-Bearded Cyclops and Red-Bearded Cyclops, Ben Stiller as Prometheus
5	5	"12 Angry Goat Herders"	Jake Hollander; Blake Lemons	Emma Fletcher	October 22, 2023	1BBDH05	0.70	0.2
When Shlub is accused of eating the goats of the goat farmers, Tyrannis invents the court system, with Shlub represented by Tyrannis and the goat farmers represented by Brenda the Sphinx. Meanwhile, Hippocampus is snubbed by Deliria who won't let him call her mom and makes a sprinkler system for Killassas where he takes up the alias of a god. Deliria hears about it from Hermes and competes with him. Cast: Carlos Alazraqui as Angry Mob Member #1, Descendant, and Witness, Keith David as Asskill, Phil LaMarr as Angry Mob Member #2, Angry Mob Member #3, and Male Juror, Jane Lynch as Brenda the Sphinx, David Pressman as Davros and Servant, Cree Summer as Female Juror, Michael Urie as Hermes
6	6	"Woods-stock"	Otis Brayboy	Siobhan Thompson	October 29, 2023	1BBDH07	0.82	0.2
While at a party in the forest, Tyrannis meets a wood nymph named Daphne who is conspiring to protect the forests by ridding the world of humans. Tyrannis' hard partying after getting kissed by Daphne attracts the attention of Dionysus: the God of Wine and Parties who intensifies the party and makes things worse for Daphne, who is forced to team up with Stupendous and Hippocampus to get Tyrannis to end the party. Meanwhile, Deliria and Shlub meet Hegemone: Goddess of Plants Blooming and Bearing Fruit and her Mantitaur Paizo. Cast: Stephanie Beatriz as Daphne, Kimberly Brooks as Wood Nymph #1, Sharon Duncan-Brewster as Hegemone, Spencer Grammer as Wood Nymph #2, Tom Kenny as Instrument Player and Tom the Centaur, David Pressman as Beans Centaur and Unicorn, Jim Rash as Dionysus, Isaac Robinson-Smith as Musician, Kari Wahlgren as Wood Nymph #3, Amber Stevens West as Wood Nymph #4, Constance Zimmer as Queen Iris
7	7	"Please Demeter"	Dominic Polcino	Abbey Caldwell	November 5, 2023	1BBDH06	1.98	0.6
While dealing with a grain blight, Tyrannis is told by Deliria that Demeter handles agriculture, but Deliria won't ask her for help as she once stole Demeter's earrings. He ends up praying to Demeter himself and winds up getting a date with her. Meanwhile, Stupendous learns that her friend Prack the Unstoppable has died from a bee sting. She enlists Hippocampus to get her into the Greek underworld so she can give Prack one last battle with one part of it involving exposing Charon to the waters of Lethe so that they can get across it. Cast: Kimberly Brooks, Holmes as Prack the Unstoppable, Laura Jackman as Siren's Bluff Hostess, Brandon Johnson as Boat Guy, Maurice LaMarche as Centaur, Susan Sarandon as Demeter, Michael Urie as Farmer, Kari Wahlgren
8	8	"Big Man on Hippocampus"	Dominic Polcino	Rob Schrab	November 12, 2023	1BBDH09	3.20	0.9
Tyrannis takes Hippocampus to a tech convention called VolCon to meet other inventors which also includes a panel that Hephaestus is hosting. Hephaestus soon befriends Hippocampus when he mentions that he picked the lock that was previously used on Prometheus. After Tyrannis meets King Minos who trash-talks Daedalus, he decides to find a replacement for Hippocampus. Meanwhile, Deliria and Shlub have the temple to themselves until Stupendous returns with her petrified friend Felix after a disastrous fight with the Gorgon Medusa. To prevent her daughter from asking Athena for help, Deliria tries to unpetrify Felix with disastrous results. Cast: Malcolm Barrett, Garrick Bernard, Steve Buscemi as Hephaestus, John DiMaggio, Chris Hardwick as himself, David Pressman as Inventor Fish, Jonathan Slavin, Kari Wahlgren as Gorgon
9	9	"Dungeons and Deliria"	Patrick Kochakji	Diana Tay	November 19, 2023	1BBDH08	0.76	0.2
A civilian has invented pants which the other civilians mock. Shlub enlists Tyrannis to help resolve the situation with the bar and the civilians. Meanwhile, Hippocampus hunts a rampaging Monstadon where he encounters Daphne and they get stuck underground. Now they must work to get out of the cavern and slay the Monstadon. At the same time, Stupendous joins her friends in a quest to the peaks of Oligyrtos to retrieve the Helmet of Iapetus and she ends up followed by Deliria, disguised as a woman named Susan who claims to be Stupendous' friend. She wins over Stupendous' party and soon runs afoul of Iapetus when the party members unknowingly free him from his imprisonment. Cast: Eric Bauza as Angry Mob Member, Stephanie Beatriz as Daphne, David Cross as Mage, Will Forte as Campos, Bobby Moynihan as Barbarian and Ranger, Kevin Michael Richardson as Iapetus and Bartender, Fred Tatasciore as Monstadon and Off-Screen Citizen, Michael Urie as Hermes
10	10	"Ty's Tail Tale"	Otis Brayboy	Jordan Young	December 3, 2023	1BBDH12	4.07	1.2
Displeased that the Killassians are stealing the town's cattle and other livestock for food, Tyrannis takes a break and accompanies Shlub to the funeral of Shlub's Manticore father in Persia where they meet the witch Belinda. In addition to being Shlub's ex, Belinda also cursed Tyrannis as an unborn child. When Belinda undoes the curse, Tyrannis starts growing a scorpion tail which he uses to intimidate Asskill and his own citizenry. Meanwhile, Stupendous and Hippocampus tend to the Pegasus in Deliria's possession against her instructions where they discover a disturbing connection between Pegasi and Unicorns. Cast: James Adomian as Crowd Member, Eric Bauza as Steve, Crowd Member, Scarred Man, and Tyrannis' Singing Voice, Garrick Bernard as Crowd Member and Dairy Farmer, Keith David as Asskill, Lydia Fox as Belinda, Kevin Michael Richardson as Crowd Member, Alanna Ubach as Crowd Member
11	11	"Tyrdra"	Blake Lemons	Jax Ball	December 17, 2023	1BBDH10	3.05	0.8
Stupendous comes across a cave and orders whatever monster to vacate it as it is in range of Krapopolis. She finds that a Hydra named Camille is inside it and she offers to leave since there are more cities in every direction. Stupendous then stops her from committing suicide when Camille doesn't want to fight any more warriors. The rest of Stupendous' family find that Stupendous had brought Camille home as Tyrannis allows Stupendous to keep it while stating that it is not cleaning up after her. After Camille is seen by the town crier, Tyrannis and Stupendous help to spread messages around as they chop off more heads to produce more heads. Soon, Shlub uses Camille to send anonymous messages which soon plunges Krapopolis into chaos. Cast: James Adomian, Eric Bauza, Stephanie Beatriz as Daphne, D'Arcy Carden as Camille, Grey DeLisle as Woman, Matt Gourley, Tessa Bonham Jones as Pippa the Narrator, David Pressman as Davros, Yong Yea
12	12	"Buy Low, Sell Ty"	Patrick Kochakji	Tom Scharpling	January 7, 2024	1BBDH11	1.30	0.3
As Tyrannis works to improve Krapopolis, he encounters a man from Athens named Gregorios who has invented vacation and money. Hippocampus invents Krapopolis' first coin so that the people of Krapopolis won't use chicken and goats to get what they want. This impresses the civilians enough that they go along with the idea of using coins. When chickens start to cost more, Tyrannis and Hippocampus head to Athens to see if they can ask for advice from Gregorios, only to be surprised on what happened to Athens where the money caused its inhabitants to act like savages. Now Tyrannis, Hippocampus, and Gregorios must find a way to fix both cities before things get worse. Meanwhile, Shlub is told by the bartender about the tab as he is given a job to tell his stories in exchange for free drinks. At the same time, Stupendous helps Deliria with cleaning out the dead animal sacrifices and will accept coins and other treasures as tributes until she learns what Shlub is doing with her worshipers at the bar. Cast: James Adomian as Not Married Killer, Eric Bauza as Man and Servant, Garrick Bernard as Board Member #3, Tessa Bonham Jones as Pippa the Narrator, Tim Meadows as Gregorios and Board Member #1, Kevin Michael Richardson as Bartender and Board Member #2, Michael Urie as Hermes, Amber Stevens West as Athena, Cedric Yarbrough as Bar Patron
13	13	"Contagion"	Dominic Polcino	Hilary Winston	February 18, 2024	2BBDH01	0.53	0.1
Stupendous tells Tyrannis about the spies from New Scepsia that are outside Krapopolis. When talking to them, Tyrannis is told by Hippocampus that the spies have come down with a case of empathy which Deliria claims was created by the tears of the Titan Empathis which almost wiped out the Olympian gods. Then he is told about Spartans by Shlub while flying in the sky. With empathy spreading to Stupendous and the Krapopolis civilians when a Spartan army is approaching, Tyrannis and Deliria head to New Scepsia in order to find the special mushrooms needed to cure so that Stupendous can be cured which leads to their encounter with Empathis' dragon form. Meanwhile, Hippocampus works to make his own cure for empathy and ends up coming up with a way infect the Spartan army which goes comically awry. Cast: Eric Bauza as Centurions, Grey DeLisle as Child and Mother, Vince Gilligan as Bread Salesman, Prospector, and Prisoner #1, Brandon Johnson as Prisoner #2, Kumail Nanjiani as Spartan Army Leader
14	14	"A Krapwork Orange"	Dominic Polcino	Zara Burdett	February 25, 2024	2BBDH09	0.53	0.1
Hippocampus has been attacked by the orphans for the fourth time as he is instructed by Tyrannis to take care of the situation. With Stupendous' help, Hippocampus rounds up the orphans as they work to control them by inventing a school. Once that was done, Hippocampus and Stupendous find them acting like an apex predator starting with them killing a Roc and get addicted to school. Meanwhile, Tyrannis goes undercover to a rally as Anarrkis the Truth Teller speaks about Tyrannis being a bad king. As Deliria and Shlub create a parade to draw away some people from the assembly, Tyrannis tries to get Anarkkis to like him which doesn't go well she ties him up and causes a coup d'état. Cast: James Adomian as Mr. Straw, Grey DeLisle as Orphan, Echo Kellum as Robert the Storyteller, Bobby Moynihan as Orphan, Kathy Nagler as Eudoria, Chelsea Peretti as Anarrkis the Truth Teller, Kevin Michael Richardson as Mr. Straw's Master, Kari Wahlgren as Orphan
15	15	"Death Takes a Holiday"	Blake Lemons	Raza Syed	March 3, 2024	2BBDH04	0.61	0.1
Deliria receives a message orb from Hestia who invites her to her all-inclusive party on her private island Vitalus somewhere in the Three Realms and she wants her to bring Tyrannis with her. Upon arrival, they find that Broseidon is among the guests. Everyone meets with Hestia and her mortal boyfriend Humanus/Tony where the Brotos flower negates godly powers so that everyone would be equal. When it comes to the final event, Humanus turns against Hestia by not having the antidote distributed so that the Age of Man can rise much to the dismay of Tyrannis and Deliria. Now Tyrannis and Deliria work to survive the uprising. Meanwhile, Shlub, Stupendous, and Hippocampus gain a visit from Jason and the Argonauts who have stopped to resupply. When Stupendous accidentally kills all of the Argonauts, she, Shlub, and Hippocampus find a blind Homer as their travel companion as they work to cover up their deaths in order for Homer to not make a bad story about Krapopolis until he figures it out during a mock giant bladed serpent fight. Cast: Steve Agee as Heracles, Dee Bradley Baker, Dave Franco as Broseidon, Phil Augusta Jackson as Humanus, Jameela Jamil as Hestia, Chris McCausland as Homer, Michael Urie as Hermes, Amber Stevens West as Athena
16	16	"Eclipse"	Blake Lemons	Heather Anne Campbell	March 17, 2024	1BBDH13	0.58	0.1
A solar eclipse is happening. Deliria claims to Tyndarius that a solar eclipse is the result of Zeus ordering Apollo to park the Moon in front the Sun. Hermes states that the Olympians have become angry at Deliria and is needed on Mount Olympus. Apollo, Ares, Athena, and Hephaestus arrive stating that Zeus has gone missing as Apollo claims that his sister is in charge of the Moon and gets frozen trying to move the Sun because there is no air near it. As nobody knows how the sky works, Hippocampus and Hephaestus work to study the sky and make a program about it. Ares hits on Stupendous, Deliria assumes that Athena is taking advantage of Tyrannis in order to prove herself to Zeus, and Shlub and Apollo reminisce about when they are still part of a musical group. Cast: Steve Buscemi as Hephaestus, Ryan Eggold as Apollo, Chris Parnell as Ares, Michael Urie as Hermes, Amber Stevens West as Athena
17	17	"The Majors" "Salt"	Otis Brayboy	Andy Bobrow	March 24, 2024	2BBDH02	0.51	0.1
Poseidon busts Ares for wanting a spanking from the soldiers who worship him after their victory in a war. At Ares' trial presided over Apollo, Hermes, Poseidon, Athena, Hera, Aphrodite, Dionysus, and Pan on Mount Olympus, Apollo sentences Ares to be stripped of his title and be downgrading to a minor god. Deliria meets Salt who is a minor god who makes the ocean "pukey". At the auditions for the replacement Olympian held by Apollo which is not an excuse to mock the minor gods, the auditioning minor gods include but are not limited to Meticulus: God of Groupings and Order, Nocturnus: God of Nocturnal Missions, Jinx: God of Jinxing, the unnamed Goddess of Cups and Containers, the unnamed Goddess of Orange Rinds, and the unnamed God of Near-Sneezing and the Orgasms That Happen During That Time. Deliria gets involved in helping Salt when competing against Athena and her protege Mackenzus: Goddess of Accessories. Meanwhile, the people of Krapopolis have left to the forests because of an increase of poop. Hippocampus works to find a way to deal with the poop which leads to the invention of the toilet which Tyrannis is unable to do in front of everyone as well as people fearing that snakes might come up it and bite people in the butt. Cast: James Adomian as Pan, Sharon Duncan-Brewster as Hegemone and Goddess of Cups and Containers, Ryan Eggold as Apollo, Dave Franco as Broseidon, John Gemberling as Jinx, Kimiko Glenn as Mackenzus, Matt Gourley as Nocturnus, David Koechner as Poseidon, Rachael MacFarlane as Aphrodite, Kathy Nagler as Woman, Erik Charles Nielsen as Meticulus, Chris Parnell as Ares and Citizen, Jim Rash as Dionysus, Stephen Root as Salt, Pia Shah as Ermani, Michael Urie as Hermes, Amber Stevens West as Athena
18	18	"War with the Roses"	Patrick Kochakji	Sarah Carbiener	April 7, 2024	2BBDH03	0.53	0.2
The wood nymphs have been uping nature's attack on Krapopolis as Stupendous suggests that they go to war with nature. Hippocampus goes into the forest to meet with Daphne where they talk about how their families won't listen to them. They come up with to trick Tyrannis and the nature's ruler Queen Iris into meeting for an anti-war negotiation as Queen Iris arrives with Daphne, a mud monster named Thea, and a yak named Bartleby. Pan has also arrived to assist Queen Iris as Hippocampus claims that he and Deliria might get involved in the possible war. When the negotiations go south, war between Krapopolis and nature occurs. Daphne follows Hippocampus into his bunker as they end up coming up with a solution to end the war. Deliria is tricked into doing a divine intervention against nature when Tyrannis dares her to mention to Pan what really happened to Zeus. Cast: James Adomian as Pan, Dee Bradley Baker as Guy, Stephanie Beatriz as Daphne, Tessa Bonham Jones as Pippa the Narrator, Kathy Nagler, Debra Wilson as Thea, Constance Zimmer as Queen Iris
19	19	"Muse Your Illusion"	Otis Brayboy	Danielle Weisberg	April 21, 2024	2BBDH05	0.66	0.2
Tyrannis reveals to the crowd that he has created the new flag for Krapopolis only for its unveiling to be outstaged by a play that was invented by Craig who was inspired. Hippocampus discovers that the Muses are behind Craig's inspiration as he claims that they consume their resources and destroy city. He plans to come up with a way to catch a Muse. When it works, Hippocampus works on a device that harvests the inspiration from the Muses as they later take advantage of Tyrannis. Meanwhile, Deliria learns that Shlub is undergoing a metamorphosis that all Mantitaurs go through and stays by his side to keep him safe from different predators. Cast: Eric Bauza as Actor #1, Guardian with Knife, and Impressed Citizen, Zach Cherry, Auliʻi Cravalho as the Muses, Grey DeLisle, Matt Gourley, Kathy Nagler, Ryan Ridley, Nick Rutherford, Cedric Yarbrough
20	20	"Prince Hippo"	Dominic Polcino	Alex Rubens	April 28, 2024	2BBDH06	0.44	0.1
Hippocampus is interrupted in his surgery on a net weaver named Philbert by Tyrannis who wants all the family to be present for the launching of an unsinkable boat that will be the first of Krapopolis' navy. This event is crashed by the fish-like Atlanteans from the underwater city of Atlantis who want Hippocampus to come home. After some persuasion from Tyrannis, Hippocampus goes to Atlantis with Tyrannis and Shlub. Upon arrival, Tyrannis and Shlub learn that Hippocampus is a Prince of Atlantis and that his biological mother is the unnamed Queen of Atlantis who doesn't remember Shlub. He proceeds to show her how to handle their breathing apparatus to work on land so that the Atlanteans can invade the land. Meanwhile, Deliria is introduced to one of the heads of her cult by Stupendous who wants to be her high priestess as Deliria gives her some of her power as Stupendous states that she just met him. Stupendous discovers that the High Priestess is a Hittite who wants the worship of Deliria to be continued without her. Cast: Eric Bauza as Shrinking Guy and Squid, Kurt Braunohler as Philbert, Kate Comer as the Queen of Atlantis, Ryan Ridley as the Prince of Atlantis, Niccole Thurman as High Priestess
21	21	"Olive Oil Crisis"	Patrick Kochakji	Andy Bobrow	May 5, 2024	2BBDH07	0.57	0.2
Amidst a lot of crisis on Krapopolis, Deliria drags Stupendous on a mission to assume the form of geese in order to poop on a new temple for Athena. After getting struck in the head by a rock thrown by a hunter, Deliria loses her memory and thinks that she is a goose. After a brief memory loss, Deliria and Stupendous are then caught by the hunter. Meanwhile, Tyrannis gets the information on the olive oil shortage from Shlub and Tyrannis asks him to attend the trade meeting after hearing about the win-win phrase. After missing the meeting, Shlub got the olive oil from Asskill. Tyrannis then puts Shlub in charge of handling the different crisis involving the sinkhole, produce shortage, bat swarms, and fire-breating orc situations. It soon comes to the point when Asskill and the bar patrons want Shlub to be the new King of Krapopolis. Cast: Eric Bauza as Squid and Goose Hunter, Emily C. Chang, Andy Daly as Simon, Keith David as Asskill, Colton Dunn as Brutus, John Gemberling as Joshua, Tessa Bonham Jones as Pippa the Narrator, Kathy Nagler as Miriam, Jason Ritter as Goose, Cedric Yarbrough as Kolax and Bar Patron
22	22	"The Tyrannis Crown Affair"	Blake Lemons	Sarah Carbiener	May 12, 2024	2BBDH08	0.49	0.1
A thief has been robbing from rich people. Tyrannis appoints Stupendous to deal with the thieves as he takes Stupendous' old fighting force and turns them into a police force. The police force proceed to subdue the thieves. When another rich person is robbed, the thief overwhelms the police force and makes off with Tyrannis crown. Stupendous takes action in order to pursue the thief and reclaim Tyrannis' crown. Meanwhile, Hippocampus and Deliria receive an invitation to Hermes' Monster Dome which used to be Deliria and Hermes' Pageant of Monstrous Wonders until Deliria was thrown out of Mount Olympus and the name was changed. They plan to release the monsters there. As Deliria distracts Hermes, Hippocampus makes his way to the monster pens which goes horribly awry when he gets mistaken for a contestant and is paired up against a Minotaur/crocodile hybrid. Cast: Carlos Alazraqui as Guardian #2, Police Force Member, and Rich Person #2, Dee Bradley Baker as Invitation Creatures and Hybrids, Jeff Bennett as Centurion and Rich Person #1, John Cho as Thief, Rachael MacFarlane as Aphrodite, Khary Payton as Citizen and Guardian #3, Jim Rash as Dionysus, Nick Rutherford as Guardian #1 and Police Force Member, Michael Urie as Hermes
23	23	"Remedial Archeology"	Otis Brayboy	Hilary Winston	May 19, 2024	2BBDH10	0.48	0.1
In the present, a female archaeologist named Alice stumbles upon the ruins of an underground temple. She finds a sea shell that enables her to contact Tyrannis in the past after he bought it from a merchant. He learns from Alice that Krapoplis has become a lost city by the present day and gets advice on how to make Krapopolis exist into the present. After some changes in the present, Tyrannis is told by Alice about a carving of a king where different fates occur causing different things to occur that changes Tyrannis' outcomes. Meanwhile, Shlub is invited to a monster wedding by an old sludge monster friend of his. Deliria goes along with Shlub where she tries not to offend the monster guests which goes horribly awry when she accidentally dismembers them in self-defense. Cast: Diedrich Bader as Sludge Monster and Therapist, Kimberly Brooks as Woman with Pickaxe, Emily C. Chang as Alice, Danny Jacobs as Griffin, Reporter, and Wolfman, Rachel Levy as Nurse, Keith Lucas as Bdrian, Kenny Lucas as Adrian, Adam Ray as Antique Salesman, Cedric Yarbrough as Archaeologist

=== Season 2 (2024–25) ===
No. overall	No. in season	Title	Directed by	Written by	Original release date	Prod. code	U.S. viewers (millions)	Rating (18-49)
24	1	"Ice Week!"	Patrick Kochakji	Matt Roller	September 29, 2024	3BBDH01	0.58	0.2
It is Ice Week as Tyrannis receives a large shipment of ice for the people of Krapopolis as they make different uses for it and prepare for the Ice Week Dance. During this time, Tyrannis meets a known vase reporter named Tina as Tyrannis gets smitten by her. To impress her, Tyrannis takes in an orphan that he nicknames Little Ty that his servant Kolax tried to drown on his orders. Meanwhile, Schlub finds his old Ophiotaurus friend Opie frozen in a block of ice. This causes Deliria to get him out of the sadness by thawing Opie out as they catch up where Opie finds that things have changed since the Titans were in power. At the same time, Stupendous and Hippocampus receive items from a witch to keep the ice melting and find the horses for their chariot missing as they find another way to get back to Krapopolis. Cast: Krizia Bajos as Witch, Alison Brie as Tina, SungWon Cho as Citizen, Zehra Fazal as Julia and Ice Virgin, John Gemberling as Joshua, Echo Kellum as Richard, Ebon Moss-Bachrach as Opie, Kathy Nagler as Miriam and Chloe, Danny Pudi as Orphan, Cedric Yarbrough as Kolax and Phil
25	2	"Thor"	Blake Lemons	Andy Bobrow	October 6, 2024	3BBDH03	0.51	0.1
Tyrannis and a Harpy companion hunt a wolf into the "Northern World" where he accidentally uses an Olympian steel arrow on a Yggdrasil. The Norse Gods Odin, Hela, Loki, and Thor arrive with Jörmungandr. Deliria doesn't want Stupendous to end up experience the same thing that she had when she once dated Thor at the time when the Norse Gods interact with the Olympian Gods. In an attempt to get Thor to remember her while trying to keep Tyrannis from interfering, Deliria turns into Stupendous which gets ruined by Tyrannis and results in Deliria accidentally injuring Thor. Meanwhile, Shlub and Hippocampus see that three trolls named Grarg, Grunk, and Grelda have come with the Norse Gods as they work to befriend them with unexpected results. Cast: Colton Dunn as Odin, Kate Flannery as Hela, Nick Kroll as Grarg and Jörmungandr, Rachael MacFarlane as Aphrodite, Cristina Milizia as Grelda, Randall Park as Loki, Seth Rogen as Thor and Grunk, Michael Urie as Hermes, Amber Stevens West as Athena
26	3	"Hades Nuts"	Jake Hollander	Matt Roller	October 20, 2024	3BBDH02	0.99	0.3
Tyrannis states that the Axeman's Guild are coming to Krapopolis for an audition so that they can see if anyone takes death seriously. Displeased that Deliria and Shlub are not taking humanity seriously, Tyrannis plans to teach them the value of human life and win the approval of the Axeman's Guild where they accidentally kill their assigned prisoners Hector and Gregorios. Meanwhile, Stupendous uses the Death Machine to go to the Greek underworld to visit Prack the Unstoppable who she started to develop a crush on and partake in different activities like thwarted Eurynomos from preying off corpses while taking a liking to Prack the Unstoppable. As Hippocampus had been banned from the Greek underworld for stealing from Hades, he has Stupendous sneak into Hades' palace during her visits to Prack the Unstoppable as they get a job working as enforcers to Hades. Cast: Krizia Bajos as Arke, Holmes as Prack the Unstoppable, Erik Charles Nielsen as Axeman Guild Member #1, Zac Oyama as Axeman Guild Member #2, June Diane Raphael as Eurynonos' Wife, Sam Richardson as Hades, Ryan Ridley as Axeman Guild Member #3, Paul Scheer as Eurynomos, Cedric Yarbrough as Axeman Guild Member #4
27	4	"Mr. Boogens"	Dominic Polcino	Danielle Weisberg	October 27, 2024	3BBDH06	0.56	0.1
Krapopolis is suffering its first garbage crisis after Tyrannis comes up with the word "garbage" when addressing the crowd. He tells everyone including his family that they need to start doing something about the piling garbage. Deliria then takes the job of Goddess of Garbage. When it comes to someone who collects garbage, he comes up with the god Mr. Boogens who he claims to a civilian named Joshua having been grown from Deliria's pinky toe where some people believe that he is actually real. Meanwhile, Hippocampus comes up with the idea of a grease pit to trap invaders which Stupendous objects to. She gives in and they make one which they accidentally get trapped in it. Shlub also ends up trapped after getting spooked by a fly and gets grease on his wings and it also traps an invading army and two of their war elephants causing both sides to work together to get out. Cast: John Gemberling as Joshua, Tessa Bonham Jones as Pippa the Narrator, Jason Mantzoukas as Invading Army General, Lisa McGrillis as Kayleigh, Kathy Nagler as Philomena, Erik Charles Nielsen as Scott, Diona Reasonover as Miram, Joe Wong as "Knife-Hawk" Theme Singer, Cedric Yarbrough as Kolax
28	5	"Krapocalypse"	Frank Marino	Matt Roller	November 3, 2024	3BBDH08	0.93	0.2
As Hippocampus gets displeased that Stupendous has been washing her blood-covered swords in the pool that he sleeps in, Tyrannis reports to Hippocampus, Stupendous, and Shlub that the volcano Mount Krapopolis is erupting. He reveals that he has been cursed by Chronos: Personification of Time for confusing him with Cronus: King of the Titans, and has been in a time loop. In order to remedy this, Deliria plans to find a way to help Tyrannis to remove the curse that Chronos placed on him. Deliria learns that Chronos in fact cursed Tyrannis because he built Krapopolis near a volcano, causing Tyrannis to think of a way to save the city by finding a way to neutralize Mount Krapopolis with help from the rest of his family. Cast: James Adomian as Chronos, Erik Charles Nielsen as Scott
29	6	"National Lampoon's The Odyssey!"	Patrick Kochakji	Zac Oyama	November 10, 2024	3BBDH10	0.56	0.2
After giving Kayleigh a palace tour, Tyrannis is pulled away by Deliria where Shlub tells him, Stupendous, and Hippocampus that they are going on a boat trip to Storgos to attend the birthday of Shlub's mother who never met his grandchildren. As they sail off to Storgos on the boat Deliria's Rump, Shlub is challenged about his sailing by his kids. When Stupendous is thrown overboard and stung by a jellyfish, she is saved by a mermaid named Maya who is on a migration with her family. After Hippocampus gets Stupendous away from Maya, he warns her about the dark side of mermaids. Soon, the family lost the rudder gets broken, and an encounter with Scylla, Charybdis, Lobster-Man, Eel-Man, and Whalefall. Even when they arrive at Storgos that is inhabited by centaurs, Stupendous goes looking for Maya as Shlub finds that his mother is not pleased that Shlub is still hanging out with mortals. Cast: Eric Bauza as Lobster-Man, Offended Centaur, and Thomas, Minnie Driver as Shlub's Mother, Brandon Johnson as Tapestry Monster, Lisa McGrillis as Kayleigh, Zac Oyama as Sculpture Centaur, Ashley Park as Maya, Kari Wahlgren as Caroline, Charybdis, and Scylla
30	7	"Ty's Man Woman Table Chairs Food"	Otis Brayboy	Hilary Winston	November 24, 2024	3BBDH05	0.94	0.3
After Asskill gives two hogs to him, Tyrannis encounters a caravan of mapmakers led by Sophie who explains how maps work. While Killassas is on the map, Krapopolis is not on the map as Sophie states to Tyrannis that Krapopolis can be added to the map if it has a restaurant. Showing the map to his family which would put their finder Casey out of a job and suggesting that they open a restaurant, Tyrannis persuades Hippocampus to be the chef at the restaurant that he calls Ty's Man Woman Table Chair Food. They soon start to take a liking to the different dishes that Hippocampus makes as Deliria and Shlub take on different disguises to get to the restaurant. Meanwhile, Stupendous and Spike use the map to go to Kissuria to fight the Kissurians. As Spike dies in the icy mountains, Stupendous reaches the Uncrossable Chasm and encounters Babak of Kissuria after a bridge is built for the confrontation. Cast: Dee Bradley Baker as Spike and Octopus Dad, Brian Baumgartner as Casey, Keith David as Asskill, Grey DeLisle as Woman in Line, Michael Dorn as Babak, Dylan Gelula as Sophie, John Gemberling, Matt Gourley as Bard, Lisa McGrillis as Kayleigh, Kathy Nagler as Miriam, Debra Wilson
31	8	"SHLUB$"	Dominic Polcino	Raza Syed	December 8, 2024	3BBDH04	0.71	0.2
Shlub is found passed out near a large vase and is not feeling well. Hippocampus claims that Shlub is very sick and can try to find a way to cure him as Deliria does not want to use her powers on him. He invents a zapper to split Shlub into Centaur Shlub and Manticore Shlub and then splits Manticore Shlub into a human, a lion, a small dragon, and a scorpion. As it was discovered that the lion part is sick, it needs a new lion part to take its place. Tyrannis does not want to be subjected to the zapper and uses it on Hippocampus splitting him into an Atlantean and a Mantitaur before splitting Mantitaur Hippocampus into a centaur, a human, a lion, a small dragon, and a scorpion. After Atlantean Hippocampus kills Lion Hippocampus, Tyrannis opts not to be split by the zapper ray and tries to get a lion essence from Paizo, a third generation Mantitaur. This fails, causing Tyrannis to be split into his god core. Meanwhile, Deliria make lunch in the kitchen with Kolax as she fears that she might use her powers. Cast: Carlos Alazraqui as Dragon Paizo, Dragon Shlub, and Mantitaur Hippocampus, Eric Bauza as Lion, Jeff Bennett as Manticore Paizo and Lion Paizo, Khary Payton as Centaur Hippocampus, Centaur Paizo, and Centaur Shlub, Roger Craig Smith as Atlantean Hippocampus, Human Hippocampus, and Human Shlub, Cedric Yarbrough as Kolax
32	9	"Enter Prophecy Duck"	Blake Lemons; Sue Perrotto	Dash Turner	December 15, 2024	3BBDH09	0.82	0.2
As Shlub replaces his horseshoes, Hippocampus appears stating that he has trapped a Prophecy Duck which is said to have oracle powers as Tyrannis learns of this. It gives a prophecy that Shlub translates regarding a rival king rising and that Tyrannis will fall. After checking with Killass to see if he'll overthrow him, Tyrannis meets a silk rug merchant who Joshua calls the Rug King. While Shlub claims that oracle prophecies come true, Hippocampus tries to keep Tyrannis to not think of the prophecy and works to befriend him. Meanwhile, Stupendous takes Deliria into a cave so that she can have a heart to heart talk with her which Deliria tries to escape. She brings up recent incidents that Deliria caused like a fight against the cows that walk on their hindlegs who are racists had Deliria using cow poison on one of their general. However, the cave is filled with strange creatures. Cast: Sara Amini as Shelly, Dee Bradley Baker as Gyard and Prophecy Duck, Keith David as Asskill, Colton Dunn as Brutus, John Gemberling as Joshua, Echo Kellum as Rug King, Erik Charles Nielsen as Scott, Kevin Michael Richardson as Bartender
33	10	"John Fate Comes a-Knockin'"	Jake Hollander	Sarah Carbiener	February 16, 2025	3BBDH07	0.53	0.1
As Hippocampus is examining Shlub's rear, Tyrannis learns about knocking when his palace is visited by John Fate who is the brother of the Fates as he claims that the three Fate sisters Clotho, Lachesis, and Atropos are the more popular ones that everyone cares about. Deliria is against letting John Fate in as he is one of Deliria's ex-boyfriends. While being cryptic about when Tyrannis will be confronted by an angry mob and when Stupendous will fall in battle, he states that he can't predict sneezes. Tyrannis, Stupendous, and Hippocampus later see during dinner why Deliria couldn't stand him as Tyrannis tries to get John Fate who claims that he will remarry Deliria when Shlub passes away. Cast: Abby Elliott as Lachesis, Ana Gasteyer as Clotho, Laraine Newman as Atropos, Wallace Shawn as John Fate
34	11	"Stavros Live and in Concert"	Frank Marino	Malloy Moseley	February 23, 2025	3BBDH11	0.53	0.1
One night, Athena's followers arrive outside of Krapopolis with sheep and wolves for symbolism only to be busted by the Krapoplis army. Stupendous was surprised that her soldier Terry is with Athena's followers when they were brought to Tyrannis. She is told by Tyrannis that the blinde singer Stavros is in town. Upon entering the forest where Stavros is performing, he learns from Alexi that there is no "king line". At the concert, Tyrannis encounters an incognito Athena who is a Stavros fan like he is. Though Stupendous is not pleased that Tyrannis and Athena have bonded over the Stavros concert while having to contend with the threat of the Athena Boys as Athena states that she has nothing to do with them. Due to the threat of the Athena Boys, Athena and Tyrannis plan to hold a peace concert with Stavros performing. Meanwhile, Shlub learns that Deliria wants her me time as Hippocampus uses a formula to shrink Shlub so that he can follow her. He finds that Deliria has been working as a worker ant with some worker ant friends Dolores, Patty, and Winifred. Cast: James Adomian as Alexi, Yvette Nicole Brown as Winifred, Ian Cardonia as Dave, Zehra Fazal as Patty and Crowd Woman, Vince Gilligan as Prospector, Craig Robinson as Stavros, Isaac Robinson-Smith, Nick Rutherford as Terry, Roger Craig Smith as Male Ant, Cree Summer as Dolores and Wood Nymph, Amber Stevens West as Athena
35	12	"Baby Boom"	Otis Brayboy	Mo Welch	March 2, 2025	3BBDH12	0.60	0.1
As Shlub shows a vase about two women advertisements, Stupendous interpret this as Aphrodite putting an ad on a fertility fest. Deliria brings Stupendous to keep an eye on Aprhodite. Upon arrival, Deliria and Stupendous see Aphrodite induce pregnancy on anyone who becomes her followers. Stupendous encounters her old Battle Belles sleep-away camp friends Tina, Iris, and Cora who are now proud mothers and learns how they balanced between mothers and warriors. This causes Stupendous to want to have a child much to the dismay of Deliria. Meanwhile, Shlub and Hippocampus plan to go to the bathhouse and didn't tell Tyrannis because they know how he reacts to nudity. He works to get over it as he overhears some of the patrons talking bad about him causing Tyrannis to retaliate in the most unlikeliest of ways. Cast: Sara Amini as Cora, Diedrich Bader, H. Michael Croner, Grey DeLisle as Connie and Machine Operator, Zehra Fazal as Tina and Bartender, Dave Franco as Broseidon, Riki Lindhome as Lucy and Tar Maid, Rachael MacFarlane as Aphrodite, Vanessa Marshall as Iris, Erik Charles Nielsen as Scott, Cedric Yarbrough as Kolax Note: This episode was dedicated in memory of Abigail Nangle.
36	13	"Ty Big Fat Greek Wedding"	Patrick Kochakji	Monica Padrick	March 9, 2025	3BBDH13	0.44	0.1
Tyrannis is meeting with a warrior king named Fatherinlawsus the Great as Stupendous meets him. She is told that King Fatherinlawsus has found a way to expand his empire by having Tyrannis marry someone. Stupendous is displeased that she wasn't consulted about it first. Hippocampus mentions about how some of the weddings ended in a masscre. Wanting to make sure he doesn't want to get massacred, Tyrannis is persuaded to have a baker named Cyrus to take his place in the wedding. He finds out that Cyrus in debt with the head baker and meets a baker named Ana who is actually the true bride who switched places with her identical cousin Sarah. Meanwhile, Stupendous gets to know King Fatherinlawsus as he plans to donate some of his pre-castrated soldiers to her. At the same time, Deliria prepares to set up the wedding while preparing for Hermes' arrival as he still blames her for ripping out his eye. Cast: Steve Blum as Jonathan, H. Michael Croner as Bakery Boss, Gillian Jacobs as Ana and Sarah, Robert Patrick as King Fatherinlawsus, Michael Urie as Hermes
37	14	"Love Trap, Baby!"	Dominic Polcino	Matt Roller	March 16, 2025	3BBDH14	0.45	0.1
Kolax introduces a messenger from Messinia who informs Tyrannis about the squid and gets thrown out by Stupendous. The next messenger is Angelioforos who invites Tyrannis and other bachelors to meet with Princess Lycosa at the Paradise Peninsula. Tyrannis accepts much to the dismay of Stupendous and Hippocampus who assume that it's a trap. They meet Princess Lycosa's servants Don Who Smiles and Tia Who Smiles as Tyrannis meets the suitors Musculus, Cork the Wheel-Maker, and Tod. When the suitors meet Princess Lycosa, Hippocampus finds that the flowers are enchanted as Stupendous is also affected after previously eating them. Meanwhile, Deliria and Shlub are left in charge of Krapopolis while their children are away and are told not to break anything. To invite the neighboring cities to their secret orgy when a housefly person and a witch are the only ones to attend, Deliria ends up improving Krapopolis in order to get the neighboring cities to attend by improving the roads leading to other types of improvements to Krapopolis. Cast: James Adomian, Sara Amini as Shelly, Eric Bauza as Messinia Messenger and Moustache Guy, Jamie Chung as Princess Lycosa, Colton Dunn as Brutus, John Gemberling as Joshua, Skyler Gisondo as Cork, Nick Lachey as Don Who Smiles, Vanessa Lachey as Tia Who Smiles, Lamorne Morris as Housefly Person, Kathy Nagler as Miriam, Erik Charles Nielsen as Angelioforos, Jerry O'Connell as Musculus, Diona Reasonover as Philomena, Nick Rutherford, Cedric Yarbrough as Kolax
38	15	"The Weather Stick"	Sue Perrotto	Dash Turner	March 23, 2025	3BBDH15	0.48	0.1
During the dry season, Tyrannis answers questions for Brutus, Miriam, and Joshua about when the dry season is going to end by stating that they should get through it by holding Dry Fest complete with slam poetry. Facing demands to end of the dry season, Tyrannis informs his family about the demands he's been reaching. Shlub persuades Tyrannis to cheat by showing off a weather stick that he got from the Placeans. After the mud suit fails, Tyrannis uses the weather stick to do things like creating a pool that even Baby Charybdis enjoys, starting an irrigation for a farmer, providing a bath for the orphanage, giving a guy a pond, and watering a woman's cactus. This lasts until the weather stick doesn't work right and the Placeans led by Chief Ravdi lay siege to Krapopolis wanting to reclaim the weather stick that Shlub stole from them during their Friendship Festival. Meanwhile, Shlub persuades Deliria to allow her soldiers to cool off in her temple as Hippocampus plans to cross the soldiers with the bird-watchers to create some super-citizens. Cast: Ogie Banks as Miami, Eric Bauza, Steve Blum as Tickle Troll Shaman, Colton Dunn as Brutus, John Gemberling as Joshua, Brandon Johnson, Kate Micucci as Woman with Cactus, Kathy Nagler as Miriam, Sarah Natochenny, Erik Charles Nielsen as Scott, Fred Tatasciore as Soldier, Steph Tolev, Danny Trejo as Chief Ravdi, Kari Wahlgren, Cedric Yarbrough as Kolax
39	16	"Number Twos"	Frank Marino	Zac Oyama	March 30, 2025	3BBDH16	0.56	0.1
Tyrannis unveils one of the streets that will be converted into a grand boulevard like the version he has seen in Corinth which Stupendous had to wrap up a vanity raid as she was supposed to provide an arch. This causes Tyrannis and Stupendous to each find a new Number Two to help them out. As Stupendous gets a Number Two in the warrior Zan, she is surprised when Tyrannis picks a man named Wormius to be his Number Two as Wormius plans to help Tyrannis improve Krapopolis. Wormius manages to improve Krapopolis with the grand boulevard and bodyguards as Stupendous' claims of Wormius backstabbing Tyrannis are starting to get true as Stupendous finds that Zan is wanting to be like Stupendous. Meanwhile, Hippocampus and Daphne have a date at Cyprus Cove Inn. To Hippocampus' surprise, Shlub and Deliria have checked in to the Cyprus Cove Inn as Dapne learns that Hippocampus has failed at reasoning with them in the past where her attempt to stand up for him causes Deliria to turn Daphne into a worm. Cast: Stephanie Beatriz as Daphne, Kieran Culkin as Wormius, Colton Dunn as Brutus, Nathan Fillion as Zan, John Gemberling as Joshua, Lisa McGrillis as Kayleigh, Kathy Nagler as Miriam, Erik Charles Nielsen as Scott, Khary Payton as Gus, Enemy Soldier, and Tree Masseuse, Roger Craig Smith as Long-Haired Warrior and Satyr Bellhop
40	17	"One Eye One Heart She's Stupe"	Jake Hollander	Malloy Moseley	April 6, 2025	3BBDH17	0.53	0.1
As Shlub works on remusking his possession, Tyrannis learns that Shlub has Sicilian relatives as Tyrannis is informed by a messenger that an army led by the great warrior Hector is coming to Krapopolis and anyone can come to the amphitheater to see him. Deliria and Shlub see Hector and his army performing a mock battle. Anyone who likes the performance can make a sacrifice to his sponsor Apollo. Due to Deliria and Hector knowing each other, Deliria plans to have Stupendous perform in his show while sponsoring him until the Kassites attack Krapopolis. Meanwhile, Tyrannis researches about Sicily as Shlub is persuaded by Tyrannis and Hippocampus to take them to visit their relatives consisting of Aunt Rosa, Uncle Vince, Antonio, Angelo, Maria, Checca, Antonelo, Carmela, Carmelo, Sal, Nunzio, and other cousins. Their visit is disrupted when their cousins the Bonaseras show up and claimed that that Aunt Rosa's family stole their farm resulting in a family fight. Cast: Eric Bauza as Bonasera Family Member, Dragon, and Man, Ahmed Best as Blind Man and Gargie, Grey DeLisle as Aunt Rosa and Woman, John DiMaggio as Achilles and Cousin Sal, Ryan Eggold as Apollo, James Monroe Iglehart as Hector, Michael Imperioli as Uncle Vince, Erik Charles Nielsen as Scott, Khary Payton as Messenger
41	18	"A Pimple Favor"	Otis Brayboy	Mo Welch	April 13, 2025	3BBDH18	0.49	0.1
As Hippocampus shows off his clock invention, Joshua, Miriam, and Shelly point out a zit on Hippocampus until it explodes when he gets frustrated with the people. When he rants about it to his family, Hippocampus asks Deliria for help and hooks him out with the demigod Dr. Paulakis in Dermiapolis. Once the pimple is gone, Hippocampus is enticed by Dr. Paulakis to undergo reconstructive surgery which gives him good looks at the cost of his intelligence. Meanwhile, Stupendous advises Tyrannis to put a statue in the area where the pile of dead horses used to be. Shlub and Hippocampus hire Entochus, who was known for making a statue for King Jorbus and King Glorbus, to make a statue of Tyrannus where he poses nude before Entochus' students. Cast: Asif Ali as Entochus, Sara Amini as Shelly, Eric Bauza as Cyclops Patron and Satyr Patron, Grey DeLisle as Citizens, Dermiapolis Woman #2, Students, John DiMaggio as Achilles, Citizens, and King Jorbus, John Gemberling as Joshua and Merman, Danny Jacobs as David, Ken Jeong as Dr. Paulakis, Tessa Bonham Jones as Pippa the Narrator, Lisa McGrillis as Kayleigh, Kathy Nagler as Miriam
42	19	"Mazed and Kingfused"	Patrick Kochakji	Josh Bressler	April 30, 2025	3BBDH20	0.70	0.2
Tyrannis wakes up assuming that he grew taller until it was revealed that Stupendous had placed a smaller toga on him. Tyrannis calls a prank truce as Shlub informs everyone that he is attending the divorce party of King Minos on Crete. Hippocampus goes with Shlub to make sure that he doesn't die and has him meet a man named Marc. Hippocampus meets King Minos who mentioned that this ex-wife Pasiphaë gave birth to the Minotaur and has to feed virgins to him. Because Shlub spoiled Marc who was supposed to be the virgin sacrifice, King Minos offers Shlub and Hippocampus to the Minotaur. Meanwhile, Stupendous suspects that Tyrannis' prank truce is a prank where putting a glue on Tyrannis' throne at the time when he was overseeing a peace talk between King Lapithos of Lapithion and King Pandosia of Pandosia. Cast: James Adomian as Chronos, Ronny Chieng as Lapithos, Sandy Honig, Gabriel Iglesias as Pandosia, Danny Jacobs, Mitra Jouhari as Statue #3, Erik Charles Nielsen as Scott, Alyssa Stonoha, Baron Vaughn
43	20	"Love Week"	Sue Perrotto	Ethan Judelson	May 4, 2025	3BBDH19	0.43	0.1
Tyrannis informs his civilians that the Erotes are coming as he cautions his civilians about getting shot by their arrows causing him to declare it "Love Week" as he enlists Donna to provide the relationship counseling. Tina is back in Krapopolis as Tyrannis makes another attempt to get Tina to love him at the time when she was getting a store on the Erotes as Donna advises him to follow Tina. Meanwhile, Shlub follows a centaur stampede and ends up beating the centaurs like Man O'Horse. Having come down with the winning feeling, Shlub plans to indulge in it when Man O'Horse wants a rematch. At the same time, Hippocampus gets his hand on one of Erotes arrows where his research on them causes Hippocampus and Stupendous to fall in love with the bowl that was used in the experiments. Cast: Sara Amini as Shelly, Alison Brie as Tina, Colton Dunn as Brutus, John Gemberling as Joshua, Matt Gourley as Bard, Chris Martin as Mandatar, Jinkx Monsoon as Donna, Kathy Nagler as Miriam, Erik Charles Nielsen as Scott, Kayvan Novak as Man O'Horse, Diona Reasonover as Philomena, Roger Craig Smith as Charlie and Lookout Man #1, Melissa Villaseñor as Helen, Cedric Yarbrough as Kolax
44	21	"Don Tyxote"	Dominic Polcino	Monica Padrick	May 11, 2025	3BBDH21	0.52	0.2
With Krapopolis being classified as a warring state, Tyrannis is told by Stupendous that he is having a leadership problem. Assuming that he needs a new toga, Tyrannis goes into a nearby tent where a war widow named Chira where he gets a new outfit from her. This causes a change in Tyrannis' personality as he makes plans for his citizens to serve in the army so that they can invade Persia while conscripting the nomadic shepherds that Stupendous planned to conscript. Meanwhile, Deliria and Schlub take up some role-playing where they mistake other stuff as each other. At the same time, Hippocampus and Scott defend the throne from Usurper Moths. Cast: James Adomian as Wizard, Paget Brewster as Chira, Gary Cole as the King of the Valley, John Gemberling as Joshua, Matt Gourley as Bard, Kathy Nagler as Miriam, Erik Charles Nielsen as Scott, TJ Ramini as Barfus, Amir Talai as Timon
45	22	"Ty Died"	Frank Marino	Andy Bobrow	May 18, 2025	3BBDH22	0.47	0.1
As Shlub rereads the story about Pandora from the point of view of the monsters, Tyrannis comes in stating that King Sargon has been assassinated. Stupendous claims that killing a leader is a way for someone to take over the city as she, Hippocampus, Shlub, and Deliria laugh at Tyrannis' claim that he could be assassinated next as Deliria claims that he's not important enough to be assassinated. To prove himself, Tyrannis has Scott attempt an assassination on him when one assassin doesn't want the job where it goes horribly awry and he ends up in the Underworld. To reunite Hades with Persephone and noting that Deliria hades Persephone's family, Tyrannis persuades Hades to let him return to the living where Tyrannis is not to mention his deal with Hades. Though Stupendous, Hippocampus, and Shlub plan to find the culprit who tried to assassinate Tyrannis. Cast: Sara Amini as Shelly, Ryan Eggold as Apollo, Dave Franco as Broseidon, John Gemberling as Joshua, Vince Gilligan as Prospector, Matt Gourley as Craig, Kathy Nagler as Miriam, Erik Charles Nielsen as Scott, Sam Richardson as Hades, Ryan Ridley as Red, Krysten Ritter as Persephone, Nick Rutherford as John, Amber Stevens West as Athena, Cedric Yarbrough as Kolax

=== Season 3 (2025–26) ===
No. overall	No. in season	Title	Directed by	Written by	Original release date	Prod. code	U.S. viewers (millions)	Rating (18-49)
46	1	"Krapocracy Now!"	Otis Brayboy	Alex Rubens	September 28, 2025	4BBDH01	0.54	0.1
Tyrannis attends King Con with Odysseus: King of Ithaca, Theseus: King of Athens, Volkar: King of Koth, and Oedipus: King of Thebes. Tyrannis tells his origin story by having gathered some people to form Krapopolis with him becoming king which doesn't please the attendees and the other kings. Tyrannis later brings this up with his family and plans to hold an election to see if Krapopolis will want him to be their king. This ends up leading to the voters making Shlub the new King of Krapopolis. Meanwhile, the Thousand Year God Ball is coming up as Athena mentioned to Deliria that she hasn't been invited to it since Athena and the other Olympians kicked her out. While taking advantage of Shlub's reign, Deliria fools Athena into thinking that Zeus will be in attendance causing the other Olympians to be fooled as well. Cast: Sara Amini as Shelly, Colton Dunn as Brutus, Ryan Eggold as Apollo, John Gemberling as Joshua, Rachael MacFarlane as Aphrodite, Lisa McGrillis as Kayleigh, Tim Meadows as Priest, Kathy Nagler as Miriam, Erik Charles Nielsen as Scott, Michael Urie as Hermes, Amber Stevens West as Athena
47	2	"Bobageddon"	Patrick Kochakji	Andy Bobrow	October 5, 2025	4BBDH02	1.00	0.2
On the first day as the King of Krapopolis, Shlub does not want his servants to take orders that aren't whimsical. He starts to develop a liking of boba as he heads to the land of Boba to obtain some. Shlub finds himself unable to get boba because he didn't get Frankensludge a wedding gift back in "Remedial Archaeology" and Frankensludge has become the King of Boba. This causes Shlub to enlist Stupendous to lead an invasion on Boba and the other kingdoms which starts to go awry when Stupendous gets struck by Frankensluge's arrow. Meanwhile, Tyrannis has gotten a houseboat called Ty's Folly when he is visited by Broseidon who states that he will need an offering since he is the God of Houseboat. In addition, Tyrannis learns that there is a Demigod Ceremony where demigods get special powers as Deliria and Hippocampus work to train Tyrannis for the Demigod Ceremony. Though Deliria doesn't want to tell Tyrannis that the Olympians are doing this for their entertainment. Cast: Diedrich Bader as Frankensludge, Ryan Eggold as Apollo, Dave Franco as Broseidon, Rachael MacFarlane as Aphrodite, Erik Charles Nielsen as Scott, Kari Wahlgren as Newsie, Joe Wong as "Cats in the Cradle" Singer
48	3	"Basket Baby"	Jake Hollander	Monica Padrick	October 19, 2025	4BBDH03	1.25	0.3
A basket baby arrives in a river near a kingdom and its river patrolmen don't get it because those types of babies destroy kingdoms. It drifts towards Krapopolis where Shlub has hired a drunk named Doozie who found the basket baby. Shlub does not take this so seriously. Hippocampus and Stupendous work to convince Shlub that the basket baby is dangerous and needs to be disposed of like returning it to the river and giving it to the High Priestess of the Volcano. Meanwhile, Deliria finds out that a temple for Apollo is being built in Krapopolis and has Apollo worship banned from Krapopolis. She starts to annoy Apollo by healing Scott's injuries and encroaching on his god of healing as he wasn't seen healing anyone causing Apollo to turn her into a Constellation until she lifts the ban on Apollo's temple. At the same time, Tyrannis plans to throw a late housewarming party for his neighbor Chira as he meets the social director Potluckus who organized a Welcome Ty party. Chira and Kolax warn him about Potluckus' party causing Tyrannis to compete with him. Cast: Carlos Alazraqui as River Patrolman #2, Soldier #2, Man #1, Ron/Adult Basket Baby, and Man with a Worm Eye, Eric Bauza as River Patrolman #1, Soldier #1, Man #2, and Partygoer, Paget Brewster as Chira and High Priestess of the Volcano, Ryan Eggold as Apollo, Erik Charles Nielsen as Scott, Kari Wahlgren as Basket Baby and Doozie, Cedric Yarbrough as Kolax, Billy Zane as Potluckus
49	4	"There's Something About Viscera"	Patrick Kochakji	Julieanne Smolinski	October 26, 2025	4BBDH04	0.57	0.1
With Kayleigh covering for Scott, Shlub hosts his Endless Wine, Cheese, and Pita which places Krapopolis in a famine and suffering a rat infestation. As Tyrannis doesn't want to be the Chief of Staff, Shlub cuts a deal with Asskill to deal with the rat infestation in exchange for Tyrannis getting engaged to Asskill's daughter Viscera. If Viscera doesn't accept Tyrannis, she will be exiled as Tyrannis plans to make exile look good to her until he starts to show signs of relenting. Because Killassas is a closed society, Asskill tells Shlub that Tyrannis won't leave Killasses. Meanwhile, Stupendous learns from Scott that Deliria is attending Girl's Weekend run by Hera. As Queen of the Gods, Hera asks Deliria about her current Goddess-Queen position. As she got an invitation, Stupendous decides to attend the event as Deliria was avoiding bringing her since Stupendous might be grilled. Deliria teaches Stupendous to lie until Aletheia: Personification of Truth shows up. Cast: Krizia Bajos as Hera, Keith David as Asskill, Kirby as Viscera, Lisa McGrillis as Kayleigh, Erik Charles Nielsen as Scott, Roger Craig Smith, Kari Wahlgren
50	5	"Society of Swords"	Dominic Polcino	Nick Rutherford	November 2, 2025	4BBDH05	0.64	0.1
With Viscera working as his chief of staff, Shlub is told about King Chadalus and Queen Nanini of the city of Dilpholus who are coming to Krapopolis and wanting to welcome them to the royal fold. Upon hearing that Dilpholus doesn't have a god like Sparta has Ares, Thebes has Dionysus, and Athens has Athena, Deliria plans to become a god for Dilpholus as she and Shlub plan to win them over where Deliria plans to win over Dilpholus and Shlub joins King Chadalus' Society of Swords club. Meanwhile, Tyrannis encounters a fisherwoman named Ali who has been docking her fishing boat near his houseboat as he works to impress her. Viscera plans to help him with his love life in exchange for advice on how to deal with Shlub. Cast: Sherry Cola as Ali, Robbie Daymond, Anna Faris as Queen Nanini, Kirby as Viscera, Erik Charles Nielsen as Scott and Wheel Guy, Chris Parnell as Ares, Jim Rash as Dionysus, Rob Riggle as King Chadalus, Stephen Root as Salt, Nick Rutherford, Michael Urie as Hermes
51	6	"Plague and Fury"	Jake Hollander	Jessie Gaskell	November 9, 2025	4BBDH07	1.30	0.3
Shlub takes Tyrannis to a mixer to take his name off of Viscera and also to make sure he doesn't mingle with his sloppy seconds. Tyrannis meets with Megaera where they end up matching enough for a dragon to throw them off the barge. He later tells her about a schedule conflict between a date with Megaera and watching the sunset with Viscera. Tyrannis learns that Megaera is a Fury as Shlub and Stupendous for help with Stupendous posing as an oracle and Shlub hooking Megaera up with Broseidon. Meanwhile, Doozie informs Stupendous and Hippocampus about a message from the Royal Family of Sebacea which is inhabited by the fish-like Sebaceans which is suffering from a plague as Deliria takes advantage of that by claiming to the Sebaceans that she caused the plague. Though Hippocampus comes along to see how plague works and trying to prove that an Olympian God isn't responsible. Cast: Eugene Cordero as King Argus, Dave Franco as Broseidon, Kirby Howell-Baptiste as Viscera, Danny Jacobs as David and Toad, Tessa Bonham Jones as Pippa the Narrator, Jackie Tohn as Megaera, Kari Wahlgren as Doozie and Oracle
52	7	"Casino"	Otis Brayboy	Niles Abston	November 16, 2025	4BBDH09	0.45	0.1
Apollo, Aphrodite, Athena, and Broseidon are wagering against the bad life of mortals at a casino as Shlub keeps losing. He wagers his crown to another thing he loses. When it comes to another wager, Shlub plans to wager his family's stuff as Hippocampus plans to help Shlub out by working to get Shlub's stuff back. Hippocampus makes correct bets at the casino. Meanwhile, Tyrannis and Stupendous goes on a maiden voyage while claiming that it was not to impress Viscera as he plans to get the flowers from the peaks of Gavdos Island to prove that Tyrannis is a worthy seaman. Tyrannis and Stupendous' travel becomes the topic of the casino wagers as they contend with Captain Blobbo's pirates as Hippocampus assumes that Athena is rigging the wagers causing Deliria to get involved due to the casino being where the spa she was at is at the same location. Cast: Ryan Eggold as Apollo, Dave Franco as Broseidon, Matt Gourley as Blobbo and Kraken, Kirby Howell-Baptiste as Viscera, Rachael MacFarlane as Aphrodite, Nick Rutherford, Michael Urie as Hermes, Amber Stevens West as Athena
53	8	"The Anniversary Present"	Dominic Polcino	Josh Bressler	November 23, 2025	4BBDH06	1.31	0.3
Viscera comes across Tyrannis and Stupendous preparing for Shlub and Deliria's anniversary as Shlub has forgotten the anniversary which would be a violation of Zeusian proportions. Deliria's gift to Shlub is a comet upon calling a favor from Nyx to shorten the night for it be seen. To avoid Deliria's wrath, Shlub improvises a stick as a time-travel gift from Chronos as they break a rule of interacting with their past selves which would later go awry that involves the end of the universe. Meanwhile, Hippocampus informs Tyrannis and Stupendous that Daphne broke up with him because they weren't right for each other. Tyrannis and Stupendous start by using the genie Zenobius to help deal with the break-up. Cast: James Adomian as Chronos, Stephanie Beatriz as Daphne, Harvey Guillén as Zenobius, Kirby Howell-Baptiste as Viscera, Chris Martin as Mandatar
54	9	"Nike (The Goddness)"	Jake Hollander	Ethan Judelson	December 7, 2025	4BBDH10	N/A	TBA
While seeing the "pedal machine" invention done by Bikey, Tyrannis is told by Bichael that Stupendous and Hippocampus don't love him. He ends up discovering that Stupendous and Hippocampus have been busy with Zan (who is operating as Stupendous 2) and Hippocampus 2 on their projects. Hearing an important vase news from Newsie, Tyrannis ropes Stupendous and Hippocampus into partaking in the Trial of the Triads that is sponsored by Nike: Personification of Victory which the Fates, the Furies, and the Mud Brothers had competed in. Though it ends up being a competition against each other. Meanwhile, Deliria ropes Scott into following her to the theater where The Rhapsodes are performing after Shlub took Viscera there. A disguised Deliria gets into an argument with a cat person actor about the performance and gives herself away to Shlub. Cast: Kirby Howell-Baptiste as Viscera, Nathan Fillion as Zan, Laci Mosley as Nike, Erik Charles Nielsen as Poseidon Actor and Scott, Nick Rutherford as Bikey, Nico Santos as Mangela and Samuel, Amir Talai, Kari Wahlgren as Poseidon Actor's Wife, Caperson, Newsie, and Penelope
55	10	"Vengeance Will Be Nine"	Otis Brayboy	Andy Bobrow	December 14, 2025	4BBDH11	N/A	TBA
As Stupendous trains her army's new recruits, she meets a young woman named Vengeance who needs her help to find the person who killed her father. Shlub goes along with them after getting high on lettuce and seeing a sentient ale bottle named Colin. Because the killer lives in the Caves of Digor and has a dragon protecting him, Shlub obtains a dragon trap to help Stupendous and Vengeance out until she learns the truth about who really killed Vengeance's father. Meanwhile, Viscera shows Tyrannis a severed hand from her ex-boyfriend Bloodmouth who wants to win her back as she doesn't want to get back together with him. She asks Tyrannis to pretend that she is his boyfriend to fool Bloodmouth while also roping Deliria and Hippocampus into helping out in their plot until Bloodmouth evokes the Ritual of Rektahl. Cast: Andy Bobrow as Marissa, Betty, and Lucinda, Adam DeVine as Bloodmouth, Ron Funches as Colin, Mckenna Grace as Vengeance, Kirby Howell-Baptiste as Viscera, TJ Ramini as Recruit and Trader
56	11	"Monster Week"	Patrick Kochakji	Monica Padrick	December 28, 2025	4BBDH12	N/A	TBA
At the docks, Tyrannis and Shlub exchange love stories as Shlub gets offended by the "I'm not a monster" comment he told a man about wearing sandals on his houseboat. Tyrannis mentioned that he doesn't hate monsters and originally planned a Monster Week when he was king causing Shlub to hold Monster Week in Krapopolis that is attended by literal monsters. Tyrannis enlists Stupendous and Hippocampus make costumes to fool Shlub. Tina returns to Krapopolis and gets suspicious on the fake monsters causing Tyrannis to get actual monsters here that involves gentle monsters like Gargie the Giant and patrons from a monster bar. Shlub even gets the idea to invite Typhon as Hippopcampus tries to fake his appearance until the real Typhon arrives. While Shlub advises her to keep Hermes away from Monster Week which because he previously caged monsters, Deliria heads to the Underworld and creates a dog that Hades and Hermes take a liking to it while advising it to stop the escaping spirits which leads to the creation of Cerberus. Cast: Ahmed Best as Basilisk, Gargie, Tickle Troll, and Typhon, Alison Brie as Tina, Adam DeVine as Bloodmouth, Kirby Howell-Baptiste as Three-Eyed Monster and Viscera, Brandon Johnson as Fish Mutants and Griffin, Erik Charles Nielsen as Scott, Sam Richardson as Hades, Michael Urie as Hermes, Cedric Yarbrough as Kolax
57	12	"Weekend at Zeusie's"	Patrick Kochakji	Julieanne Smolinski	January 4, 2026	4BBDH13	N/A	TBA
As Tyrannis and Viscera help Shlub out of a window, Asskill shows up as Tyrannis learns about Bloodmouth's death. As he ends Viscera's exile, Asskill plans to hook Viscera with Bloodmouth's brother Bloodmouthbrother as Tyrannis admits his feelings towards Viscera. The next day, a messenger informs Shlub that Timothy the Incredible and his army are heading to Krapopolis. Because of Shlub's rule causing a baby boom, Stupendous is stretched thin by taking up farming. When Timothy the Incredible and his army land, they find out that he took up meditation and cuts a deal with Shlub that involve Krapopolis joining Timothy the Incredible's empire. Meanwhile, Apollo, Hermes, and Athena visit Deliria to call her bluff of being with Zeus. As Hippocampus learns about what really happened to Zeus, he plans to help Deliria out by making a clone of Zeus called Zeus 2 in order to fool them. Cast: Keith David as Asskill, Ryan Eggold as Apollo, Ryan W. Garcia as Timothy the Incredible, John Gemberling as Joshua, Vince Gilligan as Prospector, Kirby Howell-Baptiste as Viscera, Richard Kind as Zeus and Zeus 2, Lisa McGrillis as Kayleigh, Kathy Nagler as Miriam, Erik Charles Nielsen as Scott, Khary Payton as Messenger, Michael Urie as Hermes, Amber Stevens West as Athena
58	13	"Advanced Family Portraiture"	Dominic Polcino	Jasmine Pierce	April 19, 2026	4BBDH08	N/A	TBA
Much earlier before the events of "Weekend at Zeusie's", Deliria has enlisted a sculptor from Motya named Giuseppe to make a family portrait in exchange for releasing his daughters. She wants to remember how to her family looked like when they are all long dead. Tyrannis, Stupendous, and Hippocampus ask for some adjustments to the statue. Because the statue was made too small, Deliria fires Giuseppe while not remembering where she put his daughters. To rectify the family statue, she gets a device from a very powerful sorceress called the Call It Whatever You Want, Just Please Stop Zapping Me to make a 3-D statue of everyone. It ends up putting on a show where Hippocampus rules Hippolopolis with his family in chains, Tyrannis being loved by everyone, Stupendous having everyone know each other better and wanting to fall in battle against the Army of Every Nation, Schlub having his kids "away", and Deliria living with caricatures of her family. Cast: John Gemberling as Joshua, Vince Gilligan as Prospector, Kirby Howell-Baptiste as Viscera, Laura Jackman, Piotr Michael, Erik Charles Nielsen as Scott, Gretchen Parlato, Joe Wong
