= Bless the Harts =

- Genre: Adult animation; Animated sitcom
- Created by: Emily Spivey
- Voices of: Kristen Wiig; Maya Rudolph; Jillian Bell; Ike Barinholtz; Kumail Nanjiani; Fortune Feimster
- Music by: Andrew Sherman
- Country of origin: United States
- Original language: English
- No. of seasons: 2
- No. of episodes: 34

Production
- Executive producers: Emily Spivey; Andy Bobrow; Phil Lord & Christopher Miller; Seth Cohen; Kristen Wiig
- Producers: Aubrey Davis Lee; Eli Dolleman
- Editors: Dennis McElroy; Jay Farnie; Karima Torres
- Running time: 22 minutes
- Production companies: Jessebean, Inc.; Lord Miller Productions; Fox Entertainment; 20th Television (Note: Credited as 20th Century Fox Television for the first season)

Original release
- Network: Fox
- Release: September 29, 2019 – June 20, 2021

Related
- King of the Hill

Bless the Harts is an American animated sitcom created by Emily Spivey for Fox's Animation Domination programming block. Premiering on September 29, 2019, the series was executive produced by Spivey, Andy Bobrow, Phil Lord, Christopher Miller, Kristen Wiig, and Seth Cohen. The series is a joint production between Fox Entertainment and 20th Television. The animation production was handled by Titmouse, Inc., with overseas animation services by Yearim and Digital eMation in Seoul, South Korea. The show's title is based on the Southern phrase "bless your heart". Spivey and Bobrow served as co-showrunners for the series.

Despite receiving positive reviews from critics, Bless the Harts suffered from low ratings which prompted Fox in April 2021 to announce the permanent cancellation of the series after only two seasons, with the final episode airing on June 20, 2021.

== Premise ==
Bless the Harts follows a working-class family living in North Carolina. The main protagonist, waitress Jenny Hart, struggles to make ends meet, and lives with her artistically talented daughter Violet Hart and mother Betty Hart. Her boyfriend Wayne has dated Jenny since her daughter Violet was a toddler, and acts as a father figure in Violet's life. Jenny works at “The Last Supper”, a religious themed restaurant, with her best friend since high school, Brenda. The show's creator Emily Spivey has stated that it is based on her life growing up in High Point, North Carolina and is set in the state's Triad region. The name of the show's fictional town, Greenpoint, is a portmanteau of Greensboro and High Point; a map in the episode "The Last Supper" shows Greenpoint in northeast Forsyth County in the region.

Bless the Harts loosely shares a universe with the Fox series King of the Hill. Spivey cites King of the Hill as her major influence for creating Bless the Harts. The fictional superstore Mega Lo Mart, first introduced in King of the Hill, makes several appearances in Bless the Harts.

== Cast ==
The main characters of Bless the Harts (From left to right) Jenny Hart, Wayne Edwards, Violet Hart, Betty Hart (below)

=== Main ===
- Kristen Wiig as Jenny Hart, a single mother who struggles to make money for her family by working as a waitress at the Last Supper. She ran out on her wedding to local wealthy legend Don Reynolds, but not before she got pregnant with his daughter. Wiig also voices Greenpoint newscaster Maykay Bueller.
- Maya Rudolph as Betty Hart, Jenny's widowed mother. In "Jenny Unfiltered" and "Betty's Birthday", her age is revealed to be 53. Even though her husband Ed is dead, he is mentioned multiple times in the series. Rudolph also voices Norma, Greenpoint's mail lady and Dr. Chakrabarti (season 1), Wayne's neighbor.
- Jillian Bell as Violet Hart, Jenny's daughter who loves art. Although sarcastic and cynical, she cares deeply about her family. She is either 13 years old (according to Bell) or a preteen (according to Betty). Reynolds is her biological father. Bell also voices Cherish, a mom with two teenage sons, as well as various background characters.
- Ike Barinholtz as Wayne Edwards, Jenny's boyfriend. Wayne's main goal is to win Violet's approval, though he has fears that he will never live up to Jenny's wealthy ex-boyfriend. Wayne is generally well-meaning, and his inner thought monologues reveal that he actually has serious and reflective concerns about being a good parental figure, but his outward attempts at expressing this usually fail awkwardly. Barinholtz also voices various background characters.
- Kumail Nanjiani as Jesus Christ, who appears as a figment of Jenny's imagination. Although, in "Toni with an I", Violet also sees him.
- Fortune Feimster as Brenda Clemmons (season 2; recurring season 1), Jenny's co-worker and best friend, and Bobbie-Nell, Jenny's elderly neighbor who picks fights with Wayne.

=== Recurring ===
- Emily Spivey as Louise, Jenny's boss, whose catchphrase whenever she enters is "Doot-dih-dih-doo", and various background characters.
- Drew Tarver as Randy, the town oddball and village idiot whose religion is Satanism, Charles Lee, a city councilman, and various background characters.
- Jeremy Rowley as Jimmy Lee, a city councilman, various background characters, Uncle Tommy, Wayne's child uncle, and Mayor Webb, the mayor of Greenpoint. Rowley provided the voice of Mayor Webb in season 1 and "The Last Supper". After, the role was recast to Jon Hamm, who took over in "Dead Mall".
- Oscar Montoya as David Brito, Violet's best friend.
- Andy Bobrow as Bud, the owner of a strip club, and various background characters.
- Gary Anthony Williams as Leonard, Wayne's co-worker and friend. Leonard does not have any lines in season 2 and only makes cameo appearances.
- Rich Blomquist as Daniel, Louise's unfaithful, uncaring and rude husband (Daniel passes away in "Big Pimpin'"), and various background characters.
- Christy Stratton as Dawn, a stripper and one of Jenny's friends, and various background characters.
- Mary Steenburgen as Crystalynn, Betty's arch-nemesis.
- Jon Hamm as Mayor Webb (starting with "Dead Mall"; see above)
- David Herman as Peter, Wayne's dim-witted co-worker, Benny, a cook at the Last Supper, and various background characters.
- Kevin Michael Richardson as Mr. Stikeleather, and various background characters.
- Grey DeLisle as MeeMaw Edwards (season 1), Ashleigh, and Mayor Webb's mother.
- Phil LaMarr as Reverend Ace, RJ Deerdeckers, Rayford, and various background characters.
- Holly Hunter as Marjune Gamble, a rich woman who is a member of the Ladies of Greenpoint.
- Janine Brito as a waitress at the Great Sydney Steakhouse.
- Ken Jeong as Doug, one of Wayne's co-workers.
- Michelle Buteau as Vanessa, Linda, Detective Bassett, and various background characters.
- JP Karliak as various background characters.
- Kenan Thompson as Travis, Wayne's childhood friend.

=== Guest ===
- John Solomon as Tracheo Steve
- Jee Young Han as Binh Ly
- Stephen Root as Rick Ocean
- Jorma Taccone as Craig
- Chris Parnell as Ian David Cole
- Susan Yeagley as Mary Jill and Dr. Pam
- Kristen Schaal as Stacey
- Natasha Lyonne as Debbie Donatello
- Ana Gasteyer as Sam
- Christopher Meloni as Detective Voccola
- Sal Vulcano as Bear Vulcano
- Fred Tatasciore as Henri Tomber
- Michael Hitchcock as Mr. Bigsby and a senator
- Daisuke Suzuki as Hiroki Kakatani
- Paula Pell as Ruth and Lenore
- Chris Diamantopoulos as Minister Mikey
- Drew Droege as Julian
- Jack McBrayer as Deputy Tug and Parker
- Sarah Baker as Pastor Joanne
- Harry Hamlin as Rod
- Tim Meadows as Sheriff Taylor
- Rachael MacFarlane as a dispatcher
- Swoosie Kurtz as Mee-Maw Edwards (season 2)
- Madhur Jaffrey as Dr. Charkabarti (season 2)
- Erin Andrews as herself
- Joe Buck as himself
- Fred Armisen as Leslie

== Episodes ==
=== Series overview ===
Season	Episodes	Originally released	
Season	Episodes	First released	Last released
1	10	September 29, 2019	January 12, 2020
2	24	September 27, 2020	June 20, 2021

=== Season 1 (2019–20) ===
No. overall	No. in season	Title	Directed by	Written by	Original air date	Prod. code	U.S. viewers (millions)
1	1	"Hug N' Bugs"	Pete Michels	Erin Wagoner	September 29, 2019	1BPJ03	1.82
Jenny gets the family water shut off after her payment bounces, so she tries to sell toys for cash, not knowing her mother Betty is buying them back. Meanwhile, Wayne discovers Violet's love for art and builds a building based on her drawings, only to get permits for it denied by the city hall.
2	2	"Can't Get There from Here"	Samantha Arnett	Emily Spivey	October 6, 2019	1BPJ01	2.99
Jenny picks up a second job as a stripper in order to make extra cash to send Violet to art school. Meanwhile, Wayne buys ostriches with his truck as collateral to also help Violet, only to find out that they can't lay eggs. Note: This is the original pilot of the series. It was originally going to be the first episode of the series before the episode, "Hug N' Bugs (which was meant to air later in the season) was chosen instead.
3	3	"Jenny Unfiltered"	Bryan Francis	Rich Blomquist	October 13, 2019	1BPJ02	1.47
After Betty tells the family the story of her old rich boyfriend, Violet takes Betty to visit his heir (guest voiced by Holly Hunter) when he died, which doesn't go according to her plans. At her job, Jenny adopts both political sides regarding a statue in an effort to earn extra tip money, but begins to question her morals and beliefs.
4	4	"Cremains of the Day"	Michael Baylis	Julia Lillis Cohen & Jeremy Rowley	October 20, 2019	1BPJ04	2.79
Jenny tries to honor her deceased father on his favorite holiday, Halloween, by letting go of his remains left at the family home, but doesn't think she is ready to let them go. Violet and Leonard take Wayne ghost hunting to conquer his fear of ghosts.
5	5	"Trash Twins"	Samantha Arnett	Janine Brito	November 3, 2019	1BPJ05	1.33
At Mega-Lo-Mart, a mysterious prankster skids their car in the parking lot, splashing Jenny and Betty with dirty street water. When Betty finds out it is her nemesis Crystalynn Poole, the two conspire revenge. Wayne deals with his misbehaving 10-year old Uncle Tommy.
6	6	"Pig Trouble in Little Greenpoint"	Pete Michels	Christy Stratton	November 10, 2019	1BPJ06	2.31
Wayne gets upset when Jenny enters him into a BBQ festival without his permission after he loses. Violet feels bad that animals are killed for human consumption, so she debates on whether or not to become a vegetarian. Betty runs into an old friend, a famous member (guest voiced by Stephen Root) of a beach band, who invites her to go on tour, so she must decide whether to go on tour with him or stay with her family.
7	7	"Myrtle Beach Memoirs"	Samantha Arnett	Andy Bobrow	November 17, 2019	1BPJ08	1.64
When Randy hides in The Last Supper for 30 days and breaks the ceiling as a result, Jenny can't go to work. So the family decides to take a vacation to Myrtle Beach, which they can't exactly afford. When Betty caves in to a timeshare, it's up to Wayne to get her out. With the help of Violet, Jenny enters a mini-golf competition in order to win money to pay for the trip, but struggles against the last hole.
8	8	"Mega-Lo-Memories"	Michael Baylis	Emily Spivey	November 24, 2019	1BPJ07	2.68
At the Thanksgiving dinner table, when the microwave breaks down, Jenny tells the story of how she got the old microwave during a Black Friday shopping brawl at the Mega-Lo-Mart, where she meets Wayne for the first time and loses Violet. Betty runs into Crystalynn in this flashback story where both work together to get a pair of pink boots, which another shopper was hoarding.
9	9	"Miracle on Culpepper Slims Boulevard"	Pete Michels	Emily Spivey	December 15, 2019	1BPJ09	2.72
Louise forces Jenny and Brenda to attend her Christmas party this year to get a bonus, making Jenny feel insecure about her own Christmas traditions when she sees how differently both of them have it. But when Louise starts crying at her own party, it's up to Jenny to help her out. Also at the party, Betty goes gambling, and Wayne gets influenced by a local theater legend (guest voiced by Chris Parnell).
10	10	"Tying the Not"	Michael Baylis	Lauren McGuire	January 12, 2020	1BPJ10	2.67
After Violet's room catches on fire, Jenny and her family have to stay at Wayne's place for a few days, where Jenny picks pointless fights with him. Remembering her fears of marriage with ex-boyfriend Don Reynolds, when Jenny finds a ring in Wayne's drawer, she angrily forces Wayne to marry her. Meanwhile, after seeing a mystery television series in which Crystalynn guest-starred, Betty attempts to expose her murder incident as a lie.

=== Season 2 (2020–21) ===
No. overall	No. in season	Title	Directed by	Written by	Original air date	Prod. code	U.S. viewers (millions)
11	1	"Violet's Secret"	Mollie Helms	Christy Stratton & Jeremy Rowley	September 27, 2020	2BPJ01	2.05
During the summer, Jenny and Betty spy on Violet, not wanting her to make the same mistakes they did as teenagers. When Bobbie-Nell files a lawsuit on Wayne for causing a loud commotion repairing the Hart family's roof, citing her pet's emotional distress, Brenda assists him.
12	2	"The Last Supper"	Samantha Arnett	Story by : John Solomon; Teleplay by : Rich Blomquist & Janine Brito	October 4, 2020	1BPJ11	0.95
When a chain restaurant called Lord Lobster moves in nearby, threatening the business of The Last Supper, Jenny wants to film a commercial praising the restaurant with the townspeople of Greenpoint featured in it, but gets upset when the townspeople don't take it seriously.
13	3	"My Best Frenda"	Pete Michels	Amy-Jo Perry	October 11, 2020	1BPJ12	1.04
When Jenny gets hired by the girls of Greenpoint to host their annual gala, her friendship with Brenda is put to the ultimate test. Betty considers getting plastic surgery after a reporter calls her a gramma. Wayne takes Violet to his temporary gig as a window washer.
14	4	"Dead Mall"	Traci Honda	Andy Bobrow & Lauren McGuire	November 1, 2020	2BPJ02	2.23
Jenny, Violet, Betty, Wayne, David, and Brenda are all invited on a final tour and walk of the closed and abandoned Greenpoint Mall to say goodbye before the mall gets demolished. During their tour, Wayne shows his fear of mannequins, and the group encounters a strange girl (guest voiced by Kristen Schaal), who claims to know Jenny. Little do they know is that she has ulterior motives.
15	5	"Pound Pinchers"	Oreste Canestrelli	Teleplay by : Sarah K. Moss & Emily Spivey; Story by : Janine Brito	November 8, 2020	2BPJ03	1.20
Betty is concerned about her weight when construction workers don't recognize her flirting, so Brenda invites her to a weight loss class. However, Betty decides to use the class as an opportunity to practice comedy with Brenda. Louise gives Jenny the night shift at The Last Supper for no extra pay, which causes her to be stressed from the craziness of the night crowd. However, she is determined to do her job when Wayne questions her.
16	6	"The McEntire Truth"	Michael Baylis	Maxwell R. Kessler	November 15, 2020	1BPJ13	1.79
At a funeral, Betty and Crystalynn make up sob stories, but Marjune gets the clout from the townspeople instead of them, they think she is bluffing and team up to take her down by getting her to take them to her "hometown". When David and Violet are in danger of failing PE due to their laziness and lack of motivation, Jenny helps them pass their presidential fitness exam.
17	7	"Mega Lo Memories: Part Deux"	Samantha Arnett	Andy Bobrow & Lauren McGuire	November 22, 2020	2BPJ05	1.99
While waiting in line in the present Black Friday, the Harts tell more Black Friday stories. Betty tells the story of her attempt to do a "slip and fall" to file a lawsuit against the Mega-Lo-Mart to get a huge settlement. Jenny tells the story of getting her new job as an NFL cheerleader, then finding out she's pregnant with Violet. And Wayne tells the story of his high-speed adventure of a milk delivery.
18	8	"Pumped"	Seung Cha	Jeremy Rowley & Christy Stratton	December 6, 2020	2BPJ04	1.07
Wayne gets a job at his favorite hardware store, but is harassed by two co-workers because of his hard-working nature. Jenny wins the lottery of $2000 on a lucky day, and Betty, Violet, and David join her in spending all of it.
19	9	"Invasion of the Potty Snatcher"	Mollie Helms; Joseph S. Scott	Erin Wagoner & Ed Voccola	December 13, 2020	2BPJ07	1.97
Betty takes Violet to meet her former high school teacher, but he forgets who she is. Jenny tries to indirectly get Louise to give her a raise, but first she must figure out how to get a person who's taking too long in the bathroom out of it.
20	10	"Crappy Death Day"	Michael Baylis	Rich Blomquist & Lauren McGuire	February 21, 2021	2BPJ06	0.74
Jenny suffers a streak of bad luck after failing to get a refund from a psychic (guest voiced by Patton Oswalt). Meanwhile, what is supposed to be a leisurely fishing trip for Wayne and his co-workers becomes a hunt for an elusive species.
21	11	"Big Pimpin'"	Traci Honda	Tim McAuliffe & Janine Brito	February 28, 2021	2BPJ08	1.04
Jenny lends Wayne to Louise to help her cope after losing her own husband. Meanwhile, Violet and David start a podcast to spread Betty's murder conspiracy theories.
22	12	"The Dogchurian Candidate"	Oreste Canestrelli	Jake Bender & Zach Dunn	March 7, 2021	2BPJ09	0.87
Mayor Webb faces an unexpectedly strong competition for reelection when a power-hungry Betty nominates a famous dog to run against him. Jenny volunteers as his campaign manager, while Wayne tries to find some dirt on the dog.
23	13	"Trollin' with the Homies"	Seung Cha	Christy Stratton & Jeremy Rowley	March 14, 2021	2BPJ10	0.99
Jenny and Wayne convince Betty to get a job, so they can have more alone time, but the plan backfires when she gets hired at The Last Supper. Meanwhile, Violet and David try to recruit a third friend into their friendship, but he ends up taking over the group.
24	14	"Nose Bud"	Samantha Arnett	Rich Blomquist	March 21, 2021	2BPJ11	0.86
While Jenny attends a bachelorette party with Brenda, Wayne is tasked with looking after Violet, but gives her too much leeway and finds himself in hot water when Violet gets a nose piercing. Meanwhile, Betty almost kills Bud with one of her pranks, and falls for him while visiting him in hospice.
25	15	"Dance Dance Resolution"	Michael Baylis	Janine Brito	March 28, 2021	2BPJ12	0.56
When Violet expresses interest in the lifestyle of a famous singer, Jenny offers to teach her how to dance in an attempt to bond with her daughter, but ends up taking things too far. Meanwhile, Wayne strives to gain Betty's appreciation by driving her to a flea market.
26	16	"Easter's 11"	Becca Wallace	Rich Blomquist & Erin Wagoner	April 4, 2021	2BPJ13	0.45
The Harts attempt to overthrow a popular new megachurch by exposing its founder (guest voiced by Chris Diamantopoulos), but the task proves to be more complicated than initially assumed. Meanwhile, Violet and David pull a prank, using a Jesus statue to scare people into feeling bad about themselves.
27	17	"Hot Tub-tation"	Joe Scott	Lauren McGuire	April 11, 2021	2BPJ14	0.74
Wayne is given a free hot tub while at work, and gifts it to Jenny for their tenth anniversary, but the party lifestyle that comes with owning it puts a strain on their relationship. Meanwhile, after a store clerk (guest voiced by Drew Droege) bans Betty from a store, she puts on a disguise to visit a sale from that store, and ends up getting more than she bargained for.
28	18	"Hoot 'N Haw"	Traci Honda	Christy Stratton & Erin Wagoner	April 18, 2021	2BPJ15	0.94
Wayne discovers he owns more land than he thought, prompting his large redneck family to move onto it. Jenny wants to get to know them better, while Wayne is embarrassed by their lifestyle. Meanwhile, Violet promises to look after Wayne's Uncle Tommy, but ends up losing track of him.
29	19	"The Drincan Temple"	Oreste Canestrelli	Janine Brito & Jeremy Rowley	May 2, 2021	2BPJ16	0.59
Wayne reconnects with his ambitious best friend Travis, but gets roped into his latest scheme to build a Machu Picchu-themed bar. Meanwhile, the Harts attempt to repair their car because of the many memories that come with it.
30	20	"When You Lose, You Win"	Seung Cha	Tim McAuliffe	May 9, 2021	2BPJ17	0.67
Upon getting rained in during Spring Break, the Harts are terrified to play board games against Jenny, who believes herself to be unbeatable. Meanwhile, Betty flirts her way into a ride-along with the cops, and uses her wits to de-escalate various crimes.
31	21	"Haul Force One"	Samantha Arnett	John Solomon & Emily Spivey	May 16, 2021	2BPJ18	0.53
When Wayne's truck is identified as the same model used in a popular movie, he ends up selling it to a wealthy collector (guest voiced by Ben Schwartz), but despite how high-tech his new truck is, it doesn't feel like a proper replacement. Meanwhile, Jenny and Brenda break up after the latter's many blunders.
32	22	"Toni with an i"	Michael Baylis	Tim McAuliffe	May 23, 2021	2BPJ19	0.53
Jenny takes a break from consulting Jesus and starts taking Brenda's advice instead, but ends up causing problems for Louise, even prompting her to adopt a new identity. Meanwhile, Wayne is skeptical of Travis' spiritual healing techniques, but has a hard time confronting him about it.
33	23	"Tiny Pies"	Becca Wallace	Andy Bobrow & Emily Spivey	June 6, 2021	2BPJ20	0.55
Jenny and Betty gift hand pies from a gas station to their new neighbors from New York, who end up mistaking them for the homemade kind. Meanwhile, Wayne and Travis train to enter a cornhole competition so they can use the prize money to save MeeMaw Edwards' restaurant––The Tipsy River.
34	24	"Betty's Birthday"	Joseph S. Scott	Emily Spivey & Andy Bobrow	June 20, 2021	2BPJ21	0.37
Wayne takes the Harts on a trip to the Outer Banks in a rented RV with a dark past that he's unaware of. Meanwhile, with Betty's birthday coming up, Jenny and Violet attempt to figure out her age, which she refuses to reveal.

== Production ==
=== Development ===
On September 25, 2018, Fox gave the production a straight-to-series order for a first season consisting of thirteen episodes. The series was created by Emily Spivey, who was also expected to executive produce alongside Phil Lord, Christopher Miller, Kristen Wiig, and Seth Cohen. Production companies involved with the series were slated to include 20th Century Fox Television and Lord Miller Productions, but with the Disney acquisition of 21st Century Fox, the Fox Corporation was added as a production company (also copyright holder) later on.

The series debuted on September 29, 2019 as part of the Animation Domination programming block, and was renewed for a second season on October 18, 2019.

On November 27, 2019, writer, showrunner, and executive producer Andy Bobrow confirmed that 3 of the episodes in season 1 would air in season 2 as holdovers.

On April 22, 2020, the show joined the rest of Fox's Animation Domination lineup in a partnership with Caffeine for the AniDom Beyond Show, a recap series hosted by Andy Richter. The hour-long program featured interviews with guests and live interactivity with fans online, with recaps for the episodes that aired through April and May. While there was no Bless the Harts episode, on May 18, 2020, showrunner Andy Bobrow joined the series with other writers from the Fox Animation Domination lineup. The second season premiered on September 27, 2020.

The second season was produced during the COVID-19 pandemic, which impacted many other television productions, but left animated production largely unaffected due to many animators working from home. The series had a panel at the 2020 San Diego Comic-Con, which was marketed as "Comic-Con@Home", to promote the season, with Kristen Wiig, Maya Rudolph, Jillian Bell, Ike Barinholtz, Fortune Feimster, Andy Bobrow, Phil Lord, and Christopher Miller. On April 1, 2021, it was announced that the second season will be the show's last due to low network ratings.

=== Casting ===
Alongside the initial series announcement, Kristen Wiig, Maya Rudolph, Jillian Bell, and Ike Barinholtz were cast in series regular roles. On January 11, 2019, Mary Steenburgen and Drew Tarver were cast in recurring roles. On July 25, 2020, during San Diego Comic-Con@Home, the series' panel announced that Ken Jeong, Kristen Schaal, and Natasha Lyonne joined the cast in guest starring roles for the second season.

== Release ==
Because of Citytv's deal with Fox, the series was also syndicated to Canada, airing new episodes the same day and time as the United States.

The show is also available to stream on Hulu, and able to purchase on YouTube and iTunes. In India, the series is simulcasted on Disney+ Hotstar because of 20th Television output deal with Star India.

On April 28, 2020, the Finland Fox channel had announced that they had picked up the series for syndication from 20th Television. The show debuted in Finland on May 9, 2020, in Finland and is available to stream on Ruutu free with commercials. Season 2 premiered on November 7, 2020.

Bless the Harts debuted on the Brazil Fox Premium channel on July 21, 2020.

The Dutch version of Comedy Central acquired both seasons.

The show is available to stream on Disney+ via the Star content hub in selected territories.

== Reception ==
=== Critical response ===
On review aggregator Rotten Tomatoes, the series holds an approval rating of 82% based on 11 reviews, with an average rating of 6.5/10. The website's critical consensus reads, "With an exceptional cast and a big heart to boot, Bless the Harts's particular worldview won't be for everyone, but it fits quite nicely into Fox's Animation Domination line-up". On Metacritic, it has a weighted average score of 70 out of 100, based on 10 critics, indicating "generally favorable reviews".

Bubbleblabber gave the first season a 6 out of 10, stating "this first season most definitely has more misses than hits in its line up which three more episodes likely wouldn't have helped at this point. With this extra time to work on these and future episodes while taking in reception from this season, I think the next will really benefit in the long term. Plus, it gets the rare honor of being a new Fox animated show that actually GOT a second season, which has not happened since Bob's Burgers got its first renewal at the start of the decade. Fox is thinking outside the box to keep its adult animation thriving, which hopefully means more chances for exploration in future seasons. I'll tell you what, these Harts are quite blessed to be given the chance to be Fox's next enduring animated series."

The Parents Television Council, a frequent critic of Fox Broadcasting Company animated comedies like Family Guy, gave the first episode a negative review.

=== Ratings ===
==== Overall ====
Viewership and ratings per season of Bless the Harts
Season	Timeslot (ET)	Episodes	First aired		Last aired		TV season	Viewership rank	Avg. viewers (millions)
Season	Timeslot (ET)	Episodes	Date	Viewers (millions)	Date	Viewers (millions)	TV season	Viewership rank	Avg. viewers (millions)
1	Sunday 8:30pm (1–9); Sunday 10:30pm (10)	10	September 29, 2019	1.82	January 12, 2020	2.67	2019–20	109	2.44
2	Sunday 8:30pm (1–9); Sunday 7:30pm (10–24)	24	September 27, 2020	2.05	June 20, 2021	0.37	2020–21	137	1.26

==== Season 1 ====
Viewership and ratings per episode of Bless the Harts
No.	Title	Air date	Rating/share (18–49)	Viewers (millions)	DVR (18–49)	DVR viewers (millions)	Total (18–49)	Total viewers (millions)
1	"Hug N' Bugs"	September 29, 2019	0.7/3	1.82	0.1	0.30	0.8	2.12
2	"Can't Get There from Here"	October 6, 2019	1.2/5	2.99	0.1	0.20	1.3	3.19
3	"Jenny Unfiltered"	October 13, 2019	0.6/3	1.47	0.1	0.22	0.7	1.69
4	"Cremains of the Day"	October 20, 2019	1.1/5	2.79	0.1	0.20	1.2	2.99
5	"Trash Twins"	November 3, 2019	0.5/3	1.33	0.1	0.17	0.6	1.51
6	"Pig Trouble in Little Greenpoint"	November 10, 2019	0.8/3	2.31	0.1	0.22	0.9	2.53
7	"Myrtle Beach Memoirs"	November 17, 2019	0.7/3	1.64	0.1	0.17	0.7	1.82
8	"Mega-Lo-Memories"	November 24, 2019	1.0/4	2.68	0.0	0.15	1.0	2.84
9	"Miracle on Culpepper Slims Boulevard"	December 15, 2019	1.0/4	2.72	0.0	0.17	1.0	2.89
10	"Tying the Not"	January 12, 2020	1.0/5	2.67	0.1	0.13	1.0	2.81

==== Season 2 ====
Viewership and ratings per episode of Bless the Harts
No.	Title	Air date	Rating (18–49)	Viewers (millions)	DVR (18–49)	DVR viewers (millions)	Total (18–49)	Total viewers (millions)
1	"Violet's Secret"	September 27, 2020	0.8	2.05	0.0	0.11	0.8	2.17
2	"The Last Supper"	October 4, 2020	0.3	0.95	0.0	0.13	0.3	1.08
3	"My Best Frenda"	October 11, 2020	0.4	1.04	—N/a	—N/a	—N/a	—N/a
4	"Dead Mall"	November 1, 2020	0.8	2.23	0.1	0.11	0.9	2.34
5	"Pound Pinchers"	November 8, 2020	0.4	1.20	0.1	0.09	0.5	1.29
6	"The McEntire Truth"	November 15, 2020	0.7	1.79	0.0	0.08	0.7	1.88
7	"Mega Lo Memories: Part Deux"	November 22, 2020	0.7	1.99	TBD	TBD	TBD	TBD
8	"Pumped"	December 6, 2020	0.4	1.07	TBD	TBD	TBD	TBD
9	"Invasion of the Potty Snatcher"	December 13, 2020	0.7	1.97	TBD	TBD	TBD	TBD
10	"Crappy Death Day"	February 21, 2021	0.3	0.74	TBD	TBD	TBD	TBD
11	"Big Pimpin'"	February 28, 2021	0.3	1.04	TBD	TBD	TBD	TBD
12	"The Dogchurian Candidate"	March 7, 2021	0.3	0.87	TBD	TBD	TBD	TBD
13	"Trollin' with the Homies"	March 14, 2021	0.3	0.99	TBD	TBD	TBD	TBD
14	"Nose Bud"	March 21, 2021	0.3	0.86	TBD	TBD	TBD	TBD
15	"Dance Dance Resolution"	March 28, 2021	0.2	0.56	TBD	TBD	TBD	TBD
16	"Easter's 11"	April 4, 2021	0.1	0.45	TBD	TBD	TBD	TBD
17	"Hot Tub-tation"	April 11, 2021	0.3	0.74	TBD	TBD	TBD	TBD
18	"Hoot 'N Haw"	April 18, 2021	0.3	0.94	TBD	TBD	TBD	TBD
19	"The Drincan Temple"	May 2, 2021	0.2	0.59	TBD	TBD	TBD	TBD
20	"When You Lose, You Win"	May 9, 2021	0.3	0.67	0.1	0.17	0.3	0.84
21	"Haul Force One"	May 16, 2021	0.2	0.53	0.1	0.14	0.3	0.67
22	"Toni with an i"	May 23, 2021	0.2	0.53	0.0	0.05	0.2	0.58
23	"Tiny Pies"	June 6, 2021	0.2	0.55	0.0	0.05	0.2	0.59
24	"Betty's Birthday"	June 20, 2021	0.1	0.37	0.0	0.06	0.1	0.43
