= Johnny Brown (actor) =

American actor and singer (1937–2022)

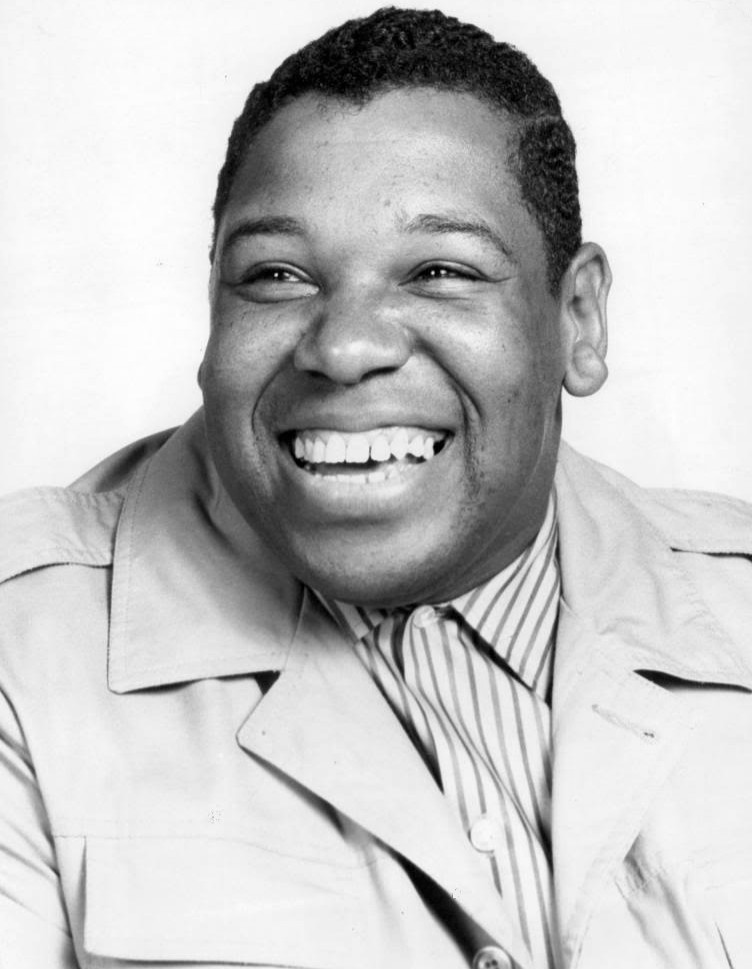
- Brown on Laugh-In in 1971
- Born: June 11, 1937; St. Petersburg, Florida, U.S.
- Died: March 2, 2022 (aged 84); Los Angeles, California, U.S.
- Other name: John Brown
- Occupations: Actor, comedian, singer
- Years active: 1961–2013
- Children: 2, including Sharon Brown

Johnny Brown (June 11, 1937 – March 2, 2022) was an American actor, comedian and singer. He was most famous for his roles as a regular cast member of the television series Laugh-in. He played Nathan Bookman the building superintendent on the 1970s CBS sitcom, Good Times until the series was cancelled in 1979.

== Life and career ==
Brown made appearances on The Leslie Uggams Show, Julia, The Flip Wilson Show, Punky Brewster, The Jeffersons, Everybody Hates Chris, The Rookies, Family Matters, Sister, Sister, The Jamie Foxx Show, The Wayans Bros, and Martin. He had a recurring role as building super Nathan Bookman in the 1970's TV series Good Times. He had a small role in the 1970 film The Out-of-Towners starring Jack Lemmon and Sandy Dennis as a waiter on a railroad dining car. Brown went to school with Walter Dean Myers when he lived in Harlem, New York City as a boy.

He appeared in several television commercials, including ads for Hunt's Manwich and the Write Brothers pen, a short-lived product of the Papermate pen company in the 1970s. The commercial consisted of an elaborate musical number, "Write On, Brothers, Write On", led by Brown as a schoolteacher who encourages his chorus line of students to use this pen for their school assignments. Brown also appeared in a TWA commercial as skycap “Bud Jones”.

In 1997, Brown contributed his voice to the introduction of the compilation album Comedy Stew: The Best of Redd Foxx. In the introduction, Brown tells of how Norman Lear had considered Brown to play the role of Lamont in Sanford and Son, but was unavailable to do so because of his prior commitment to Laugh-In, leading Lear to give the role to Demond Wilson instead. He also had a one-off role as "Fat-Man" in the original The Ghost Busters television show.

In 1998, he appeared in Season 4 of Touched by an Angel as a dying comedian in "Cry and you Cry Alone". In 1999, Brown appeared on two episodes of the Nickelodeon children's sitcom Kenan & Kel. He played Wallace "Suitcase" Jefferson in the 2004 mockumentary The Old Negro Space Program.

== Death ==
Brown died in Los Angeles on March 2, 2022, at the age of 84. He collapsed shortly after leaving a doctor's appointment for his pacemaker and was pronounced dead after arriving at a hospital.

== Records ==
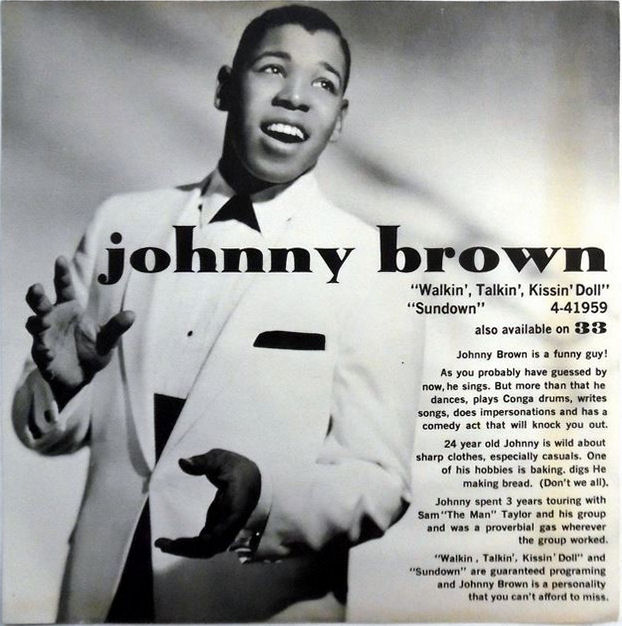
Johnny Brown in Columbia Records' promotional insert

Having toured with Sam "The Man" Taylor since 1958, Johnny Brown began his own recording career. His first release was on Columbia Records, "Walkin', Talkin', Kissin' Doll" b/w "Sundown" in February 1961. He was only 23 at the time. The promotional release was accompanied with a special insert describing his background (see picture). His next record was released in early 1968 on Atlantic Records, "You're Too Much in Love With Yourself" b/w "Don't Dilly Dally, Dolly", the latter showing off his skilled impression of Louis Armstrong. That release had initially been available on Crest Records.
