= Hug N' Bugs =

- Bless the Harts episode
- Episode no.: Season 1 Episode 1
- Directed by: Pete Michels
- Written by: Erin Wagoner
- Production code: 1BPJ03
- Original air date: September 29, 2019

Episode chronology
← Previous —	Next → "Can't Get There from Here"

"Hug N' Bugs" is the series premiere of the American animated sitcom Bless the Harts. Originally aired on September 29, 2019, on Fox, the episode was written by Erin Wagoner and directed by Pete Michels, who was a former supervising director for The Simpsons, Family Guy, and Rick and Morty.

== Plot ==
Mail lady Norma tells single mother Jenny Hart that her water bill is due in 3 days. As Jenny goes through the bills, her mother Betty tells her to come in and see a "me-me". Jenny corrects her and tells her it's a meme, when she questions the storage bill she saw earlier. Betty tells Jenny that she has a storage unit there, and Jenny threatens to remove it because the water in the house is going to get shut down. But Betty says Jenny can't do anything without the key.

Jenny's daughter, Violet, has a room is full of the family stuff as Wayne, Jenny's boyfriend, comes in and does the laundry, since the laundry was broken at his place. While he's waiting, he sees Violet drawing and asks her what the drawings symbolize. Wayne is shown as a tree stump. Thinking in his head, he sets off to be a better father figure to Violet. He sees a picture of a building of Violet's drawings, which Violet says is called Fort Indigo.

Jenny finds the key while going through some stuff and heads down to the storage unit, where she finds out that there are a lot of old toys called Hug N' Bugs that swept the nation 20 years ago. She then calls her mother, who says they can make tons of money selling these. At the Last Supper, Brenda, Jenny's best friend, warns Jenny to be mindful of reflections, as when she sold something on Craiglist, everyone saw her "cooter reflections". Jenny's figment of imagination, Jesus Christ, comes out of the painting and Jenny tells him that she's gonna make cash from selling the leftover toys to pay the water bill. Jesus tells her that's a fad, but when they're talking, EYay (a parody of eBay) notifies Jenny that her toy sold for $150.

As Jenny keeps racking up EYay sales on the toys, the toys keep coming back because Betty keeps buying them back, setting them back to nowhere. At this point, their water gets shut off. They both go down to the water district to try to sell them a Hug N' Bug toy, when the employee says they will never sell for that price.

Wayne and his friend Leonard finish a building and show Violet it is Fort Indigo. Amazed, she goes inside to get her stuff, eager to move in. While she's gone, a building inspector tells Wayne the building has to come down at the end of the week because it violates many codes. He goes to the city hall to try to get a permit, but Mayor Webb denies it. Wayne tells Violet it has to come down and apologizes, but Violet tells Wayne that he didn't finish looking at all her visuals and that Fort Indigo explodes at the end of her story, revealing that the stump shows the girl (a caricacture of Violet) her way home. When Betty goes next door to try to trade a toy for 10 minutes of water, Wayne tells her to tell the neighbor not to smoke around the toys because they will explode, which gives Violet an idea.

Jenny and Betty insert the highly flammable toys that were worthless to destroy Fort Indigo, but Jenny sells a toy on EYay at that moment, a Colin Powell Hug N' Bug. Wayne rushes into the fire to save the toy and succeeds. Jenny asks Betty if she bought the toy, which she did not. The family gets their water back on and Jenny thanks whoever bought the toy. The collector, Colin Powell himself, is shown putting Betty's toy on his collectors shelf.

== Reception ==
=== Ratings ===
On its premiere, "Hug N' Bugs" was watched by 1.82 million people and scored a 0.7 rating according to the Nielsen ratings, making it the fourth most watched show on Fox that night, behind The Simpsons, Family Guy, and Bob's Burgers respectively.

=== Critical response ===
"Hug N' Bugs" received mostly positive reviews from critics. Jonathan Wilson, writing for Ready, Set, Cut, gave the episode 3 out of 5 stars, stating, "'Hug N' Bugs' though tasked with a lot of setup, was likable and diverting enough to suggest good things for Fox's new animated sitcom." Kathryn VanArendonk of Vulture stated that "The pilot episode is extraordinarily promising, but it's also suggestive of what the Animation Domination block has been, and what it could be in the future."

And as a prolific 'Saturday Night Live' veteran, Spivey's assembled an ace voice cast that can make the most of any joke, especially the ones that veer towards the surreal. (One of the pilot's best and weirdest gags involves Jenny venting her frustrations to a hallucinated Jesus, voiced as a playful weirdo by Kumail Nanjiani.) And frankly, even if the jokes were less sharp, there's rarely any going wrong with the pair of Wiig and Rudolph, who show exactly why they've become such ubiquitous comedy players. In their hands, every joke gets told to its fullest potential, and their easy chemistry makes the relationship between their characters feels all the realer, even when they're at direct odds. That's the best a family sitcom can hope for with its cast, so with a bit more time, 'Bless the Harts' could absolutely distinguish itself from its Fox animation peers.

— Caroline Framke

One of few negative reviews for the premiere episode came from Tim Goodman, writing for The Hollywood Reporter, who stated that the episode "just kind of sits there for 30 minutes, pleasant but not particularly funny as it sets up the Hart family," and recommended viewers to skip the series and watch King of the Hill. On the options of skipping the episode, or watching it, Decider voted "Stream it!", stating, "We wish we could make more of a slam-dunk recommendation of 'Bless The Harts'. The show has a lot of room to improve, but the writers and cast are top-notch, and the story is warm enough to give it a chance."
