= The Old Negro Space Program =

- NASSA Lineup
- Directed by: Andy Bobrow
- Written by: Andy Bobrow
- Starring: Johnny Brown, Andy Bobrow
- Narrated by: Rodney Saulsberry
- Release date: 2004
- Running time: 10/11 minutes
- Country: United States
- Language: English

The Old Negro Space Program is a short mockumentary in the style of a Ken Burns film. Imagining a black space program, whose "blackstronauts" were excluded from "White NASA", the film lampoons Burns's history of the Negro leagues, a subject of his 1994 series, Baseball.

The ten-minute film was produced and directed by Andy Bobrow, who wrote for the television series Hype, Malcolm in the Middle and later, Community. Bobrow later went on to write the Community episode "Pillows and Blankets", another parody of Ken Burns.

It was created for broad release on the Internet.

== Plot ==
To impress a girl that he likes, Wallace "Suitcase" Jefferson applies for a job at the newly formed NASA. Unfortunately, since America's "love affair with racism was in full swing", Jefferson learns that NASA is whites-only. Undaunted, Jefferson and his friend "Loopie" Louie Hays form their own astronaut group. Their creation—the Negro American Space Society of Astronauts (NASSA)—is a resounding success, with more than 240 "blackstronauts" signing up by 1960. The venture also brings personal success to Jefferson—he wins the girl's heart and later marries her.

Using spaceships cobbled together from old rocket engines, landing capsules, a school bus, and a used Cadillac, NASSA quickly becomes a major player in the space race. Its members farm out across the country, barnstorming in small towns to raise money and becoming minor celebrities. In Washington, the US government worries about losing the space race to the Soviet Union, but is "ten times as worried" about losing the race to NASSA.

Like NASA, NASSA suffers some significant setbacks. Sullivan Carew dies a hero's death when his rocket-powered school bus burns up in the atmosphere, while Peter "Stinky Pete" Carver catches fire in an Illinois church parking lot. Unlike NASA, however, the blackstronauts refuse to slow the pace of their program (Stinky Pete is extinguished and makes another launch the following day).

The film features a letter from Sullivan Carew to his wife written two days before his death. It is a parody of the real-life letter by Union Army soldier Sullivan Ballou, which was used by Ken Burns in his documentary The Civil War.

NASA attempts to lure away those members of NASSA who have light skin and can pass as white, including Gordon Cooper and Buzz Aldrin. When this fails to produce the desired effect, the government issues a "black blackout" and forces the mainstream media to focus only on negative issues affecting the black community. Soon the newspapers are full of stories about crime and riots, and the achievements of NASSA go unreported.

On September 31, 1966, Suitcase Jefferson and Louie Hayes land their rocket-powered Coupe de Ville on the surface of the Moon and return safely to Earth. Their amazing feat is buried by the black blackout, and appears on page 34 of the Cincinnati Enquirer (and, presumably, gets the same treatment in other papers). The article reads as follows:

Negroes Land on Moon

Talk about getting lost! Wallace Jefferson and Louis Hayes, both negroes, have wandered all the way to the moon!

The hapless pair entered lunar orbit late yesterday afternoon and finally landed on the surface of the moon several hours later. They plan to return later this week.

The incident is not a total tragedy. "We may want to talk with these negroes," said NASA mission commander Deke Slayton. "Their mishap may just help us in our goal to land a man on the moon by the end of the decade."

Saddened by the nation's lack of interest in their heroics, Jefferson and his friends decide to shut down NASSA.

== Reception ==
The Old Negro Space Program was nominated for the 2005 Nebula Award for Best Script, but was ruled ineligible because the film "did not meet the requirement of professional release, or the 12 month period for nomination (after professional release) expired prior to the film receiving enough nominations to be placed on the ballot;" the SFWA, administrators of the award, stated that the disqualification in no way reflected on the work's quality.

P. Djèlí Clark considered it to be "[c]leverly done" and "funny", and noted that it "addresses issues ranging from institutional racism to white co-option of black achievement" — while also observing that it could be interpreted as "mocking real issues of black oppression and rendering them as entertainment, thus diluting their importance".

At Slate, Phil Plait called it "brilliant".

== Cast ==
- Jordan Black ... Sullivan Carew (voice)
- Andy Bobrow ... Dr. Warren Fingeroot (a homage to Shelby Foote)
- Johnny Brown ... Wallace "Suitcase" Jefferson
- Rodney Saulsberry ... Narrator (voice)

== Known Blackstronauts ==
The following members of NASSA were shown or named in the film:

- Wallace "Suitcase" Jefferson - co-founder, landed on Moon
- "Loopie" Louie Hayes - co-founder, immortalized in song, landed on Moon
- "Rocket" Randall
- Sullivan Carew - died in re-entry
- Peter "Stinky Pete" Carver - caught fire the night before a mission launch in Elgin, IL
- "Buzz" Aldrin - Co-opted by NASA during the "black blackout", since he could pass for white
- Gordon Cooper - Co-opted by NASA during the "black blackout", since he could pass for white
