= Andy Bobrow =

American television writer and producer

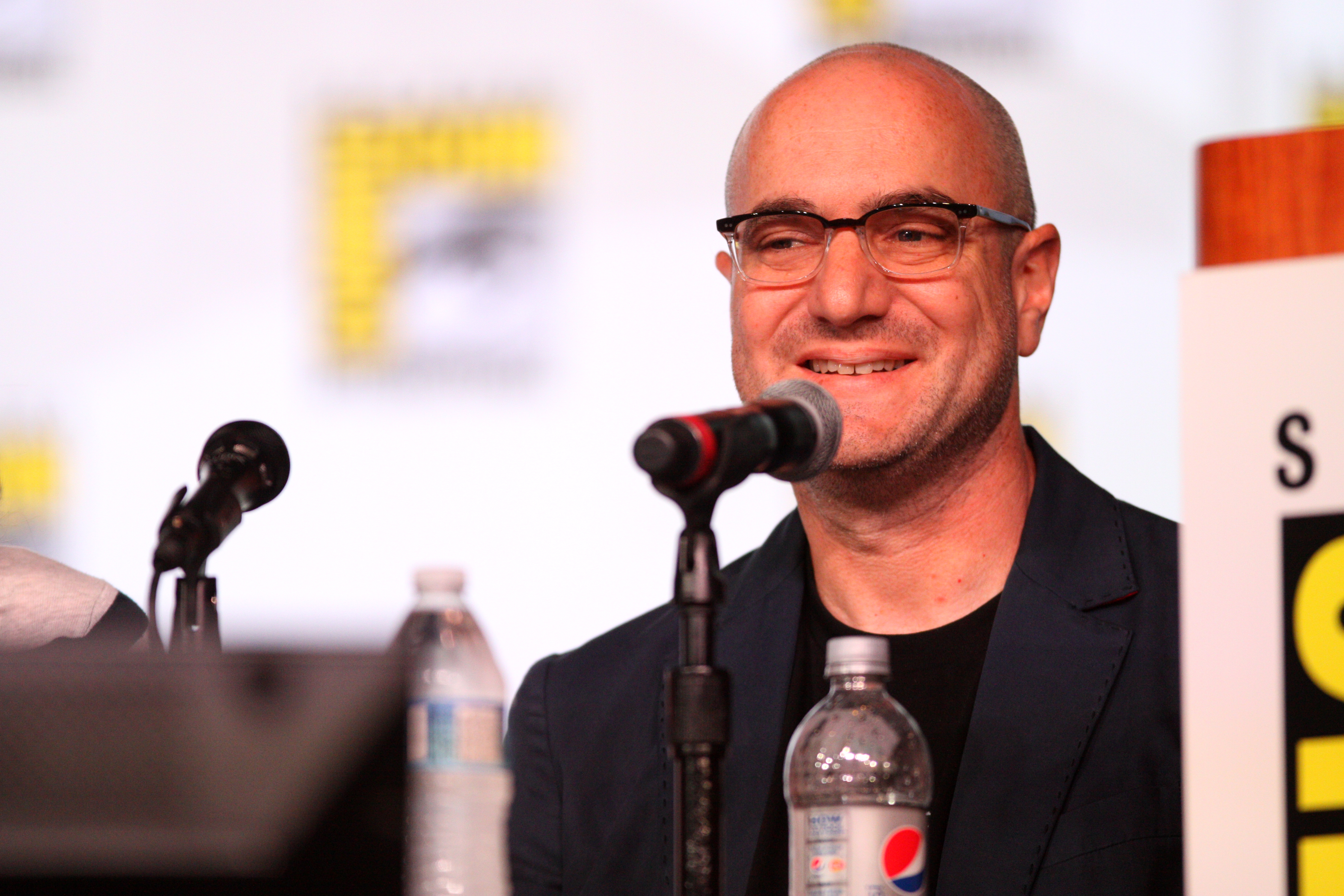
- Andy Bobrow speaking at the 2012 San Diego Comic-Con
- Occupations: Writer, producer, director
- Years active: 2000–present
- Known for: Community; Malcolm in the Middle

Andy Bobrow is an American television writer and producer known for his work on Community. He was previously a writer for Malcolm in the Middle, head writer for The Last Man on Earth, Brooklyn Nine-Nine, Bless the Harts and created a mockumentary called The Old Negro Space Program. He currently voices Owly on the Love Me Cat Show.

== Early life and career ==
Bobrow attended Berkley High School in Berkley, Michigan, and Michigan State University. He plays the tuba and majored in music. He was a copywriter at several advertising agencies in Detroit and Los Angeles, including Campbell-Ewald and Ketchum. Bobrow also performed in the Groundlings Theater Sunday Company. It was there that Bobrow made several significant connections, including Will Forte, who introduced Bobrow to his agent at UTA, and Jordan Black, who recommended Bobrow for his first TV writing job, on the short-lived sketch comedy show Hype on the WB Network.

Bobrow wrote the second episode of the Fox comedy, The Last Man on Earth, which was first aired as the second half of the series premiere, March 1, 2015. Bobrow continued to serve on the team until the show was cancelled in 2018. He was also a writer, showrunner, and executive producer on Fox's Bless the Harts. After Bless the Harts was cancelled in 2021, he joined the writing team at Krapopolis, where he currently is on the writing team for seasons 2 and 3.
