= Bless your heart =

Common phrase in the Southern United States

"Bless your heart" is a phrase common to the Southern United States. The phrase has multiple meanings and is used to express genuine sympathy but sometimes pity or as an insult that conveys condescension, derision, or contempt. It may also be spoken as a precursor to an insult to mitigate its severity. Meanings range from sincerity to exasperation, and are primarily imparted through context and tone. While common in the South, it is primarily used by individuals who wish to "be sweet” and do not wish to "act ugly".

== Notable examples ==
In 2016, Nikki Haley, then governor of South Carolina, received extensive press coverage for saying the phrase in response to an attack by presidential candidate Donald Trump.

Speaking about ex-husband Ben Affleck's large back tattoo of a rising phoenix, Jennifer Garner said, "You know what we would say in my hometown about that? 'Bless his heart.'"

During the 2026 United States Senate election in Mississippi, in response to a question about incumbent Republican senator Cindy Hyde-Smith's premature declaration of victory, candidate Scott Colom issued the statement "bless her heart."

== See also ==
- Culture of the Southern United States
