= Jordan Black (actor) =

American actor and comedy writer (born 1970)

- Born: Gary Andre McCrory; November 9, 1970 (age 55); Kankakee, Illinois, U.S.
- Occupations: Actor, writer

External image
- Jordan Black IMDb photo

Jordan Black (born Gary Andre McCrory; November 9, 1970) is an American actor and comedy writer.

== Early life ==
Black was born in Kankakee, Illinois.

== Career ==
He has written for Saturday Night Live and starred in the Comedy Central show Halfway Home as Sebastian "C-Bass" Yates, an ex-convict for internet fraud. He voiced Sullivan Carrew in the 2004 mockumentary The Old Negro Space Program. He also appeared as himself in a 2003 episode of MADtv.

Black is also an alumnus of The Groundlings, a Los Angeles-based improvisational and sketch comedy troupe and theatre. Although he retired from the theatre's Main Stage Company in the mid-2000s, Black still comes back regularly to perform in The Groundlings’ all-improv shows The Crazy Uncle Joe Show and Cookin' with Gas, and is also a teacher at The Groundlings. He appeared in Season 9, Episode 5 ("Thank You for Your Service") of Curb Your Enthusiasm (2017) and has made cameos on the NBC television show Community as the dean of City Community College, Steven Spreck, and on the CBS sitcom How I Met Your Mother. He appeared in Sarah Cooper: Everything's Fine in 2020.

== Filmography ==
Year	Title	Role	Notes
2004	The Old Negro Space Program		
2006	For Your Consideration	Whitney's Assistant	
2009	Spread		
2009	The Legend of Pancho Barnes and the Happy Bottom Riding Club		
2010	Election Day		
2012	3, 2, 1... Frankie Go Boom	Sullivan Carew (voice)	
2017	Cook Off!		
2021	Barb and Star Go to Vista Del Mar		

== Television ==
Year	Title	Role	Notes
2026	Life, Larry and the Pursuit of Unhappiness	Samuel Cooper	
