= Krapopolis =

American adult animated sitcom

- Genre: Animated sitcom; Fantasy comedy; Sword and sorcery
- Created by: Dan Harmon
- Starring: Richard Ayoade; Matt Berry; Pam Murphy; Duncan Trussell; Hannah Waddingham
- Composer: Joe Wong
- Country of origin: United States
- Original language: English
- No. of seasons: 3
- No. of episodes: 58 (list of episodes)

Production
- Executive producers: Dan Harmon; Alex Rubens (2024–present); Steve Levy; Jordan Young (2023–2024)
- Running time: 22 minutes
- Production companies: Harmonious Claptrap; Fox Entertainment Animation (Note: Credited as Fox Entertainment Studios for first two seasons)

Original release
- Network: Fox
- Release: September 24, 2023 – present

Krapopolis is an American adult animated sitcom created by Dan Harmon for the Fox Broadcasting Company. Before its series premiere, the series was renewed for a second season in October 2022 and for a third season in March 2023. The series premiered on September 24, 2023, on the Animation Domination programming block. The first season concluded on May 19, 2024. In July 2024, Fox renewed the series for a fourth season ahead of the season 2 premiere. In May 2025, the series was renewed for a fifth season, ahead of the season 2 finale and the season 3 premiere. The third season premiered on September 28, 2025.

== Premise ==
Set in a parodic version of mythical Ancient Greece, the series centers on a dysfunctional family of humans, gods, and monsters that tries to run one of the world's first cities without killing each other.

== Voice cast ==
The main characters of Krapopolis (from left to right) in the season three promotion: Deliria, Shlub, Tyrannis, Stupendous, and Hippocampus

=== Main ===
- Richard Ayoade as Tyrannis, son of Shlub and Deliria, paternal half-brother to Hippocampus, maternal half-brother to Stupendous and the main protagonist who is the demigod king of Krapopolis. In season three, he abdicates his position to his father.
- Matt Berry as:
  - Shlub, the thousand-year-old father of Hippocampus and Tyrannis who is a Mantitaur (a centaur/manticore creature), Deliria's husband, and an unemployed artist. In season three, he becomes the king of Krapopolis when Tyrannis abdicates.
  - Paizo, a third-generation Mantitaur who is Hegemone's husband.
- Pam Murphy as Stupendous, the daughter of Deliria, Tyrannis' maternal half-sister, and Hippocampus' stepsister. Stupendous is a half-cyclops demigoddess and wears an eyepatch that covers up where her right eye would be. She is the leader of Krapopolis' military.
- Duncan Trussell as Hippocampus, a fish-like Atlantean who is Tyrannis' paternal half-brother and Stupendous's stepbrother. He is an inventor who wears a fishbowl helmet filled with water to survive and a bronze baby walker that helps him get around on land.
- Hannah Waddingham as Deliria, the mother of Tyrannis and Stupendous and Shlub's wife who is the Goddess of Self-Destruction and Questionable Choices. She was mentioned to have been kicked out of Mount Olympus for an as-yet-unidentified offense.

=== Recurring ===
- James Adomian as:
  - Pan, the Satyr-like God of the Wild.
  - Chronos, the God of Time.
  - Various civilians
- Sara Amini as Shelly, a civilian of Krapopolis.
- Eric Bauza
- Keith David as Asskill, the ruler of the barbaric and cannibalistic Killassian tribe at Killassas who is the "Son of Kill, Slayer of Ass".
- Grey DeLisle as Various citizens
- Colton Dunn as:
  - Brutus, a civilian of Krapopolis.
  - Odin, the King of the Norse gods.
- Ryan Eggold as Apollo, the God of the Sun who was in a band with Shlub once.
- Dave Franco as Broseidon, the God of Houseboats and nephew of Poseidon who is "famous for being famous".
- John Gemberling as:
  - Joshua, a citizen of Krapopolis.
  - Jinx, the God of Jinxing.
- Vince Gilligan as the unnamed prospector is seen by a campfire doing occasional narrations to the viewer at the end of some episodes
- Matt Gourley as:
  - Bard
  - A Kraken that Deliria knows
  - Nocturnus, the God of Nocturnal Missions
  - Various civilians
- Kirby Howell-Baptiste as Viscera, a Killassian and the daughter of Asskill who becomes Shlub's advisor.
- Tessa Bonham Jones as Pippa, the narrator whose voice can be heard at the end of some episodes explaining how certain moments in Ancient Greece would lead to the creation of something in modern times.
- Rachael MacFarlane as Aphrodite, the Goddess of Love.
- Lisa McGrillis as Kayleigh, a citizen of Krapopolis.
- Kathy Nagler as
  - Miriam, a civilian of Krapopolis.
  - Various characters
- Erik Charles Nielsen as:
  - Scott, a palace guard who works for Tyrannis.
  - Flavius, a citizen who is turned into a monster by Deliria.
  - The unnamed minor god of "when you feel like you have a sneeze but you never get there"
- David Pressman as:
  - Davros
  - Various civilians
- Kevin Michael Richardson as:
  - The unnamed bartender of the bar that Shlub frequents.
  - Iapetus, a Titan.
  - Mr. Straw's Master
- Ryan Ridley as Various characters
- Nick Rutherford as Various characters
- Tara Strong
- Alanna Ubach
- Michael Urie as Hermes, the Messenger of the Gods and one of Deliria's few remaining friends on Mount Olympus, where he tells her juicy gossip.
- Kari Wahlgren as:
  - Newsie, a young news vase dealer
  - Doozie, a drunk who becomes Shlub's social secretary
  - Various citizens
- Amber Stevens West as Athena, the Goddess of Wisdom, War, Hard Work, Dedication, Humor, Excellency, Humility, Leadership, and Life to the Fullest who is one of Deliria's rivals.
- Cedric Yarbrough as:
  - Kolax, a servant of Tyrannis.
  - A patron of the bar that Shlub frequents.

=== Guest voices ===
- Steve Agee as Heracles, a famous Greek hero with super-strength.
- Diedrich Bader as Frankensludge, a sludge monster who was among the monster wedding attendees killed by Deliria and was put back together by her using different monster parts. He later becomes the king of Boba.
- Krizia Bajos as Hera, the Queen of the Olympian Gods.
- Malcolm Barrett as additional voices
- Brian Baumgartner as Casey
- Stephanie Beatriz as Daphne, a wood nymph and Hippocampus' occasional love interest who along with other wood nymphs want to rid the world of humans to protect the forest.
- Ahmed Best as:
  - Gargie, a giant who can feel no pain
  - Blind Man
  - Typhon, the Father of Monsters. While Deliria called him the "God of Monsters", Shlub called him the "Monster of Monsters".
- Adam Bobrow as:
  - Marissa, a talking ale mug
  - Betty and Lucinda, twin talking baskets
- Kurt Braunohler as Philbert
- Paget Brewster as Chira, a war widow and clothes vendor.
- Alison Brie as Tina, a vase reporter and Tyrannis' love interest who shows up whenever Tyrannis declares a special week.
- Yvette Nicole Brown as Herophile, a sea nymph and daughter of Poseidon.
- Steve Buscemi as Hephaestus, the Gods' Blacksmith.
- Dove Cameron
- D'Arcy Carden as Camille, a Hydra that Stupendous befriends.
- Zach Cherry as additional voices
- Ronny Chieng as additional voices
- John Cho as Thief
- SungWon Cho as Citizen
- Jamie Chung as Princess Lycosa, the human-shaped attachment to a giant spider's tongue
- Sherry Cola as Ali, a fisherwoman who Tyrannis develops a crush on
- Gary Cole as the King of the Valley, the unnamed ruler of the kingdom at the edge of the Persian Empire.
- Kate Comer as the Queen of Atlantis, the unnamed fish-like ruler of Atlantis and the biological mother of Hippocampus.
- Eugene Cordero as King Argus, the fish-like King of Sebacea.
- Auliʻi Cravalho as the Muses
- David Cross as Mage
- Adam DeVine as Bloodmouth, a Killassian who is the ex-boyfriend of Viscera.
- Daveed Diggs as Carrots, a centaur and Herophile's ex-boyfriend.
- John DiMaggio as:
  - Achilles, a famous warrior whose weakness is his heel.
  - Donny, a Cyclops who is Stupendous' biological father.
- Michael Dorn as Babak, a Kissurian warrior.
- Minnie Driver as Shlub's mother, an unnamed centaur who is the grandmother of Tyrannis, Stupendous, and Hippocampus.
- Sharon Duncan-Brewster as Hegemone, the Goddess of Plants Blooming and Bearing Fruit.
- Abby Elliott as Lachesis, one of the Fate Sisters who measures the thread of life.
- Anna Faris as Queen Nanini, the queen of Dilpholus.
- Nathan Fillion as Zan, a bodyguard
- Kate Flannery as Hela, the Norse Goddess of the Dead.
- Will Forte as Campos
- Ryan W. Garcia as Timothy the Incredible, a conqueror with an armada who wanted to do a merger with Krapopolis.
- Ana Gasteyer as Clotho, one of the Fate Sisters who spins the thread of life.
- Dylan Gelula as Sophie, a mapmaker
- Skyler Gisondo as Cork, a wheel-maker and a suitor for Princess Lycosa.
- Kimiko Glenn as Mackenzus, the Goddess of Accessories.
- Mckenna Grace as Vengeance
- Spencer Grammer as Wood Nymph
- Harvey Guillén as Zenobius, a genie
- Chris Hardwick as a fictionalized version of himself, an Ancient Greek who is cursed to moderate all panels until the end of time.
- Holmes as Prack the Unstoppable, a friend of Stupendous who died from a bee sting that they were fatally allergic to and resides in the Greek underworld. Prack was identified as non-binary by their second appearance in "Hades Nuts".
- James Monroe Iglehart as Hector, a famous warrior from Troy.
- Gabriel Iglesias
- Michael Imperioli as Uncle Vince
- Danny Jacobs as David, the boyfriend of Pippa.
- Gillian Jacobs as Ana
- Laura Jackman
- Jameela Jamil as Hestia, the Goddess of the Hearth.
- Ken Jeong as Dr. Paulakis, a demigod who works at Dermiapolis.
- Mitra Jouhari
- Echo Kellum as Robert the Storyteller
- Tom Kenny as Tom the Centaur
- Richard Kind as:
  - Zeus, the King of the Olympian Gods
  - Zeus 2, a clone of Zeus created by Hippocampus
- David Koechner as Poseidon, the God of the Sea.
- Nick Kroll as:
  - Grarg, a Norse troll that Shlub and Hippocampus try to befriend.
  - Jörmungandr, the Midgard Serpent who introduces the Norse gods when they arrive in Greece.
- Nick Lachey as Don Who Smiles, one of Princess Lycosa's servants.
- Vanessa Lachey as Tia Who Smiles, one of Princess Lycosa's servants.
- Maurice LaMarche as:
  - King Papatonis
  - Player #2
  - Centaur
- Riki Lindhome as:
  - Lucy
  - Tar Maid
- Kenny and Keith Lucas as Adrian and Bdrian, two twins who some people claim were one person split into two.
- Jane Lynch as Brenda, a Sphinx.
- Zosia Mamet
- Jason Mantzoukas as Invading Army General
- Chris Martin as Mandatar
- Chris McCausland as Homer, a blind poet.
- Joel McHale as Sportscaster #1
- Tim Meadows as Gregorios, a man from Athens who shows Tyrannis how the Athenians created money.
- Piotr Michael
- Kate Micucci as Woman with Cactus
- Jinkx Monsoon as Donna, a relationship counselor in Krapopolis.
- Lamorne Morris as Anthropomorphic Fly
- Laci Mosley as Nike, the Personification of Victory
- Ebon Moss-Bachrach as Opie, an Ophiotaurus who is an old friend of Shlub.
- Bobby Moynihan as:
  - Barbarian
  - Ranger
  - Jaxton, an orphan
- Annie Murphy
- Kumail Nanjiani as Spartan Army Leader
- Sarah Natochenny as Worshipper
- Laraine Newman as Atropos, one of the Fate Sisters who cuts the thread of life.
- Kayvan Novak as Man O'Horse, a centaur racer.
- Jerry O'Connell as Musculus, a suitor for Princess Lycosa.
- Zac Oyama as:
  - Axeman Guild Member
  - Centaur Sculpture
- Ashley Park as Maya, a mermaid who saves Stupendous from drowning.
- Randall Park as Loki, the Norse trickster god.
- Chris Parnell as Ares, the God of War.
- Robert Patrick as King Fatherinlawsus, a warrior king.
- Chelsea Peretti as Anarkkis the Truth Teller
- Danny Pudi as Orphan
- TJ Ramini
- June Diane Raphael as Eurynomos' wife, a Daimon
- Jim Rash as Dionysus, the God of Wine and Parties.
- Adam Ray as Wolf
- Diona Reasonover as Philomena
- Sam Richardson as Hades, the God of the Underworld.
- Rob Riggle as:
  - Sportscaster #2
  - King Chadalus, the king of Dilpholus.
- Jason Ritter as Goose
- Krysten Ritter as Persephone, the Queen of the Underworld.
- Craig Robinson as Stavros, a blind singer who plays a lute.
- Tim Robinson as Cyclops
- Seth Rogen as:
  - Thor, the Norse god of thunder.
  - Grunk, a Norse troll
- Stephen Root as Salt, the God of Salt and Deliria's cousin whose salt makes the ocean "pukey".
- Nick Rutherford as Various characters
- Susan Sarandon as Demeter, the Goddess of Agriculture who is one of Deliria's rivals.
- Paul Scheer as Eurynomos, a Daimon.
- Pia Shah as Ermani
- Wallace Shawn as John Fate, the brother of the Fate Sisters.
- Jonathan Slavin as Inventor Fish
- Ben Stiller as Prometheus, a Titan who gave fire to mortals and was chained to a rock on Zeus' orders, where he had an eagle peck out Prometheus' liver for all eternity.
- Jackie Tohn as Megaera, a member of the Furies.
- Danny Trejo as Chief Ravdi, the chief of the Placeans.
- Baron Vaughn as additional voices
- Melissa Villaseñor as Helen, a civilian of Krapopolis.
- Zach Woods
- Billy Zane as Potluckus, a member of Krapopolis' houseboat neighborhood who is known for throwing better parties.
- Constance Zimmer as Queen Iris, the queen of the wood nymphs.

== Episodes ==
Season	Episodes	Originally released	
Season	Episodes	First released	Last released
1	23	September 24, 2023	May 19, 2024
2	22	September 29, 2024	May 18, 2025
3	13	September 28, 2025	April 19, 2026

== Production ==
In June 2020, it was announced that Dan Harmon had signed a deal with Fox to create a new adult animated comedy for 2022, with a straight-to-series order. It is Fox Entertainment Studios' first fully owned animated comedy series. Bento Box Entertainment is the animation studio.

In May 2021, it was announced that the series would be titled Krapopolis. At the same time, Fox stated that it would be "the first-ever animated series curated entirely on the blockchain", and the network would sell NFTs and other digital tie-ins to the series. According to Fox, NFT owners "will be able to vote on specific show content and dictate exclusive on-air elements."

In June 2021, it was announced that Jordan Young would be the showrunner for the series.

In October 2022, Fox gave the series an early renewal for a second season ahead of its premiere.

In March 2023, Fox gave the series another early renewal ahead of its premiere, with the show lasting for a total of three seasons. The following month, it was announced that Alex Rubens would replace Young as showrunner for the second and third seasons.

In July 2024, the series was renewed for a fourth season ahead of the second-season premiere.

In May 2025, the series was renewed for a fifth season ahead of the third-season premiere.

== Release ==
In July 2022, Fox announced the series was scheduled to premiere with a special preview episode on November 27, 2022, before its official premiere in 2023. It was delayed to September 24, 2023. The second season premiered on September 29, 2024. The third season premiered on September 28, 2025.

In Canada, Citytv and CHCH share the broadcast rights due to scheduling issues and is available to stream on Citytv+. In the United Kingdom, the first season was acquired by BBC iPlayer, available on the streaming platform from 15 September 2026.

== Reception ==
The show has received generally mixed reviews. The review aggregator website Rotten Tomatoes reported an approval rating of 56% with an average rating of 6/10, based on 16 critic reviews. The website's critics consensus reads, "Carried by its superb voice cast like Atlas shouldering the Earth, Krapopolis falls short of divine comedy but offers consistent enough chuckles for fans of animated raunch." Metacritic, which uses a weighted average, assigned a score of 60 out of 100 based on 14 critics, indicating "mixed or average reviews".

=== Ratings ===
Viewership and ratings per season of Krapopolis
Season	Timeslot (ET)	Episodes	First aired		Last aired		TV season	Viewership rank	Avg. viewers (millions)	18–49 rank	Avg. 18–49 rating
Season	Timeslot (ET)	Episodes	Date	Viewers (millions)	Date	Viewers (millions)	TV season	Viewership rank	Avg. viewers (millions)	18–49 rank	Avg. 18–49 rating
1	Sunday 8:00 p.m. (1, 8, 10–11); Sunday 8:30 p.m. (2–6, 9, 12–23); Sunday 8:31 p.m. (7)	23	September 24, 2023	3.82	May 19, 2024	0.48	2023–24	TBD	TBD	TBD	TBD
2	Sunday 9:30 p.m. Sunday 9:00 p.m. (18, 20-22); Wednesday 9:00 p.m. (19)	22	September 29, 2024	0.58	May 18, 2025	0.47	2024–25	TBD	TBD	TBD	TBD
3	Sunday 9:00 p.m.	13	September 28, 2025	0.54	April 19, 2026	TBD	2025–26	TBD	TBD	TBD	TBD

=== Accolades ===
Year	Award	Category	Nominee	Episode	Result	Ref.
2024	Primetime Creative Arts Emmy Awards	Outstanding Character Voice-Over Performance	Hannah Waddingham	"Big Man on Hippocampus"	Nominated	
