= The Simpsons season 9 =

Season of television series

The Simpsons
- Season 9
- DVD cover featuring The Simpson family attending a showing of the 200th episode.
- Showrunners: Mike Scully (18 episodes); Bill Oakley; Josh Weinstein (3 episodes); Al Jean; Mike Reiss (2 episodes); David Mirkin (2 episodes)
- No. of episodes: 25

Release
- Original network: Fox
- Original release: September 21, 1997 – May 17, 1998

Season chronology
- ← Previous; Season 8 Next → Season 10

The ninth season of the American animated sitcom The Simpsons aired on Fox between September 21, 1997, and May 17, 1998. It began with "The City of New York vs. Homer Simpson". Mike Scully served as showrunner for the ninth production season. The ninth broadcast season contained three episodes with 4F-series production codes, indicating that they were hold-over episodes from production season eight, and two episodes with 3G-series production codes, which are not explicitly confirmed to be part of any production season but are speculated to be relabeled 3F-series (seventh production season) episodes. This makes it the first broadcast season to include holdover episodes from two previous production seasons.

This season includes the 200th episode of the show, "Trash of the Titans", which aired on April 26, 1998. Season nine won three Emmy Awards: "Trash of the Titans" for Primetime Emmy Award for Outstanding Animated Program (for Programming Less Than One Hour) in 1998, Hank Azaria won "Outstanding Voice-Over Performance" for the voice of Apu Nahasapeemapetilon, and Alf Clausen and Ken Keeler won the "Outstanding Music and Lyrics" award. Clausen was also nominated for "Outstanding Music Direction" and "Outstanding Music Composition for a Series (Dramatic Underscore)" for "Treehouse of Horror VIII". Season nine was also nominated for a "Best Network Television Series" award by the Saturn Awards and "Best Sound Editing" for a Golden Reel Award. Along with season ten, season nine has been cited by several critics as the transition between the series' classic era and its decline in quality.

The Simpsons 9th Season DVD was released on December 19, 2006, in Region 1, January 29, 2007, in Region 2 and March 21, 2007, in Region 4. The DVD was released in two different forms: a Lisa-shaped head, to match the Maggie, Homer and Marge shaped heads from the three previous DVD sets, and also a standard rectangular shaped box. Like the previous DVD sets, both versions are available for sale separately.

== Voice cast & characters ==
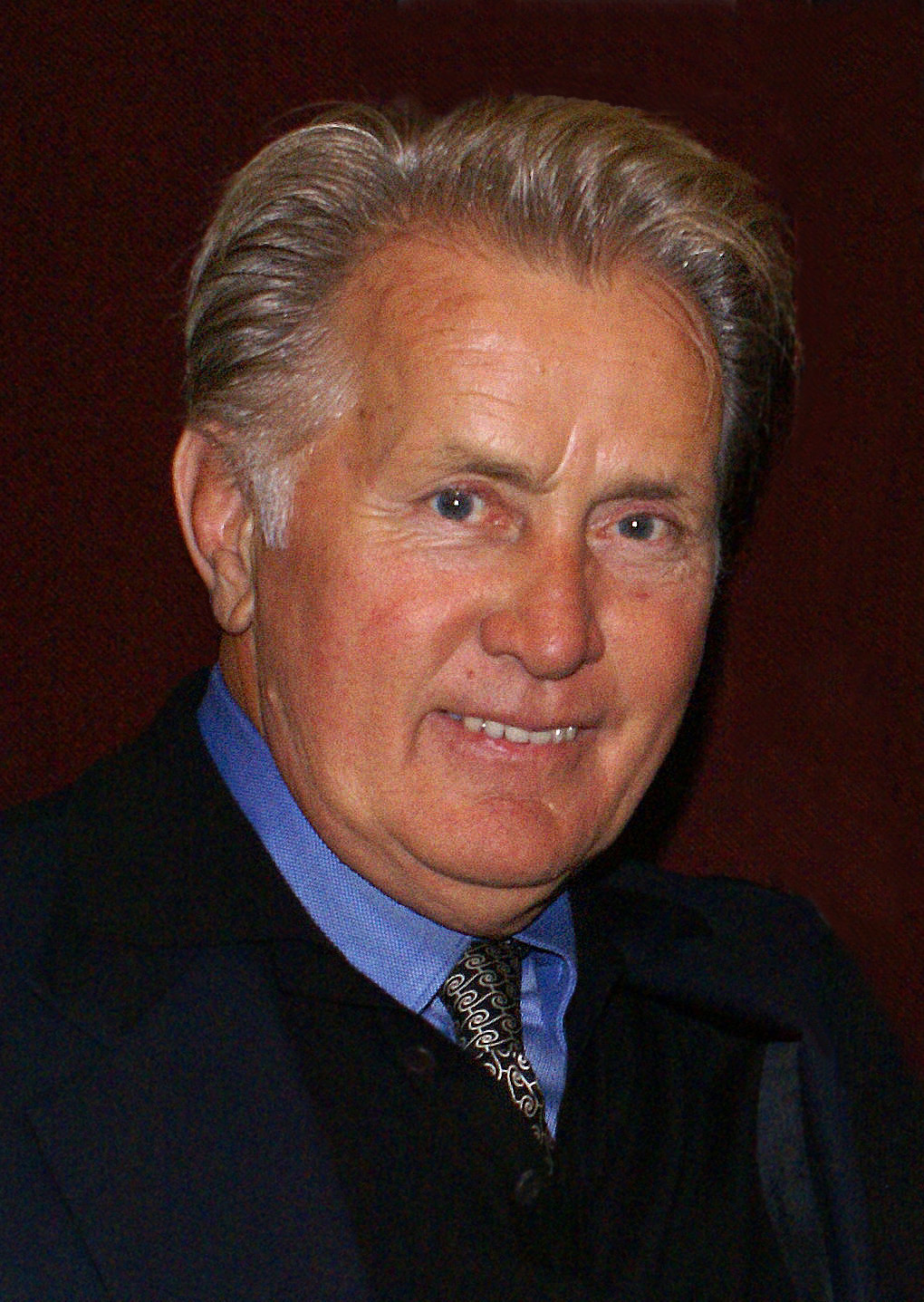
Martin Sheen guest-starred as the real Seymour Skinner in the infamous episode "The Principal and the Pauper"

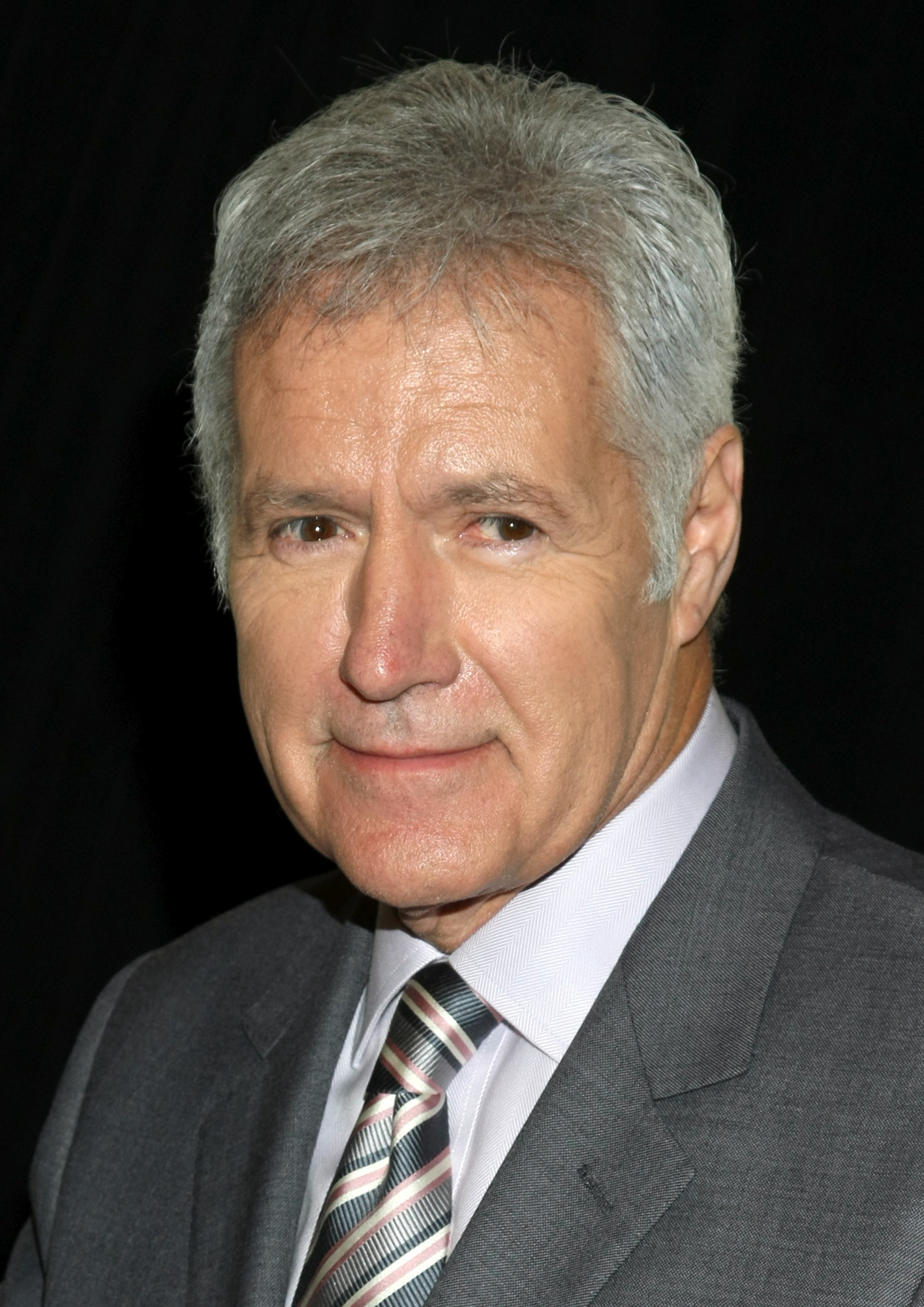
Jeopardy! host Alex Trebek made a guest appearance as himself in the Christmas episode "Miracle on Evergreen Terrace"

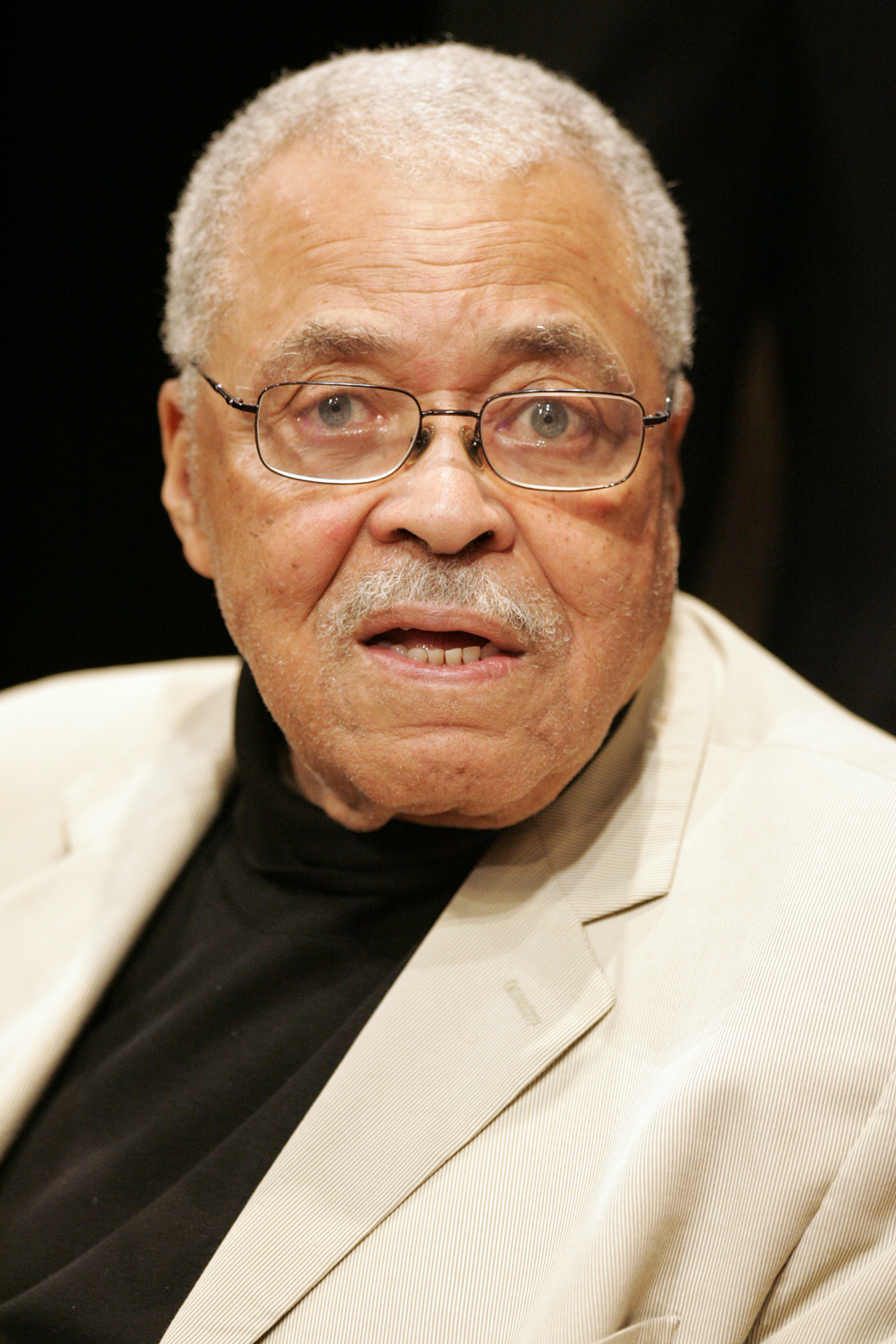
James Earl Jones narrated the episode "Das Bus"

This is the last season to feature the character Lionel Hutz, voiced by Phil Hartman. Following Hartman's death on May 28, 1998, Hutz was retired along with Hartman's other recurring character Troy McClure; his final speaking role as Hutz was five months earlier, in the episode "Realty Bites", and has since occasionally appeared as a background character.

=== Main cast ===
- Dan Castellaneta as Homer Simpson, Barney Gumble, Groundskeeper Willie, Mayor Quimby, Grampa Simpson, Kodos, Sideshow Mel, Krusty the Clown, Rich Texan, Hans Moleman, Blue-Haired Lawyer, Gil Gunderson, Jack Marley, Santa's Little Helper, Louie and various others
- Julie Kavner as Marge Simpson, Selma Bouvier, Patty Bouvier and various others
- Nancy Cartwright as Bart Simpson, Ralph Wiggum, Nelson Muntz, Todd Flanders, Rod Flanders, Kearney Zzyzwicz, Database and various others
- Yeardley Smith as Lisa Simpson
- Hank Azaria as Moe Szyslak, Carl Carlson, Duffman, Superintendent Chalmers, Apu, Comic Book Guy, Professor Frink, Chief Wiggum, Cletus Spuckler, Snake, Captain McCallister, Kirk Van Houten, Ernest, Lou, Nick Callahan, Leprechaun, Charlie, Legs, Bumblebee Man and various others
- Harry Shearer as Lenny Leonard, Kent Brockman, Judge Snyder, Principal Skinner, Dr. Hibbert, Dr. J. Loren Pryor, Ned Flanders, Herman Hermann, Kang, Reverend Lovejoy, Sanjay Nahasapeemapetilon, Rainier Wolfcastle, Waylon Smithers, Gunter, Jasper Beardsley, Eddie, Mr. Burns, George H. W. Bush, God, Otto Mann and various others

=== Recurring ===
- Doris Grau as Lunchlady Doris
- Pamela Hayden as Jimbo Jones, Milhouse Van Houten, Rod Flanders, Patches and various others
- Tress MacNeille as Agnes Skinner, Jimbo Jones, Dolph Starbeam, Cookie Kwan, Poor Violet, Belle, Billy, Crazy Cat Lady, Brandine Spuckler and various others
- Maggie Roswell as Miss Hoover, Maude Flanders, Luann Van Houten, Ruth Powers, Helen Lovejoy, and various others
- Russi Taylor as Uter Zorker, Martin Prince, Sherri and Terri, Wendell Borton and Lewis

=== Guest stars ===
- Marcia Wallace as Edna Krabappel (14 episodes)
- Phil Hartman as Troy McClure, Lionel Hutz, Lyle Lanley and Noah (5 episodes)
- Martin Sheen as the real Seymour Skinner ("The Principal and the Pauper")
- Fyvush Finkel as himself playing Krusty the Clown ("Lisa's Sax")
- Joe Namath as himself ("Bart Star")
- Roy Firestone as himself ("Bart Star")
- Mike Judge as Hank Hill ("Bart Star")
- Andrea Martin as Apu's mother ("The Two Mrs. Nahasapeemapetilons")
- Jan Hooks as Manjula Nahasapeemapetilon ("The Two Mrs. Nahasapeemapetilons")
- Stephen Jay Gould as himself ("Lisa the Skeptic")
- Alex Trebek as himself ("Miracle on Evergreen Terrace")
- George Harrison as himself ("All Singing, All Dancing")
- Jim Varney as Cooder ("Bart Carny")
- James Earl Jones as the narrator ("Das Bus")
- Jack Ong as the Chinese fisherman ("Das Bus")
- Jay Leno, Bruce Baum, Janeane Garofalo, Bobcat Goldthwait, Hank Williams Jr. and Steven Wright as themselves ("The Last Temptation of Krust")
- Helen Hunt as Renee ("Dumbbell Indemnity")
- Rod Steiger as Captain Tenille ("Simpson Tide")
- Bob Denver as himself ("Simpson Tide")
- Michael Carrington as Drill Sergeant ("Simpson Tide")
- Paul Winfield as Lucius Sweet ("The Trouble with Trillions")
- Steve Martin as Ray Patterson ("Trash of the Titans")
- U2 as themselves ("Trash of the Titans")
- Paul McGuinness as himself ("Trash of the Titans")
- Brendan Fraser as Brad ("King of the Hill")
- Steven Weber as Neil ("King of the Hill")

== Reception ==
The ninth season is considered by some fans and critics to be the end of the Golden Age of The Simpsons. Alasdair Wilkins of The A.V. Club said: "From here on out, we're in The Simpsons' decline phase, though there's plenty of room to disagree just how stark the drop-off actually was." Chris Turner wrote in his book Planet Simpson that "one of the things that emerged was that [the staff] began to rely on gags, not characters, wherever that switch got flipped, whether it's the ninth or tenth season." On Rotten Tomatoes, the ninth season of The Simpsons has a 67% approval rating based on 6 critical reviews.

The second episode of the ninth season, "The Principal and the Pauper" is often regarded as one of the most controversial episodes of the entire series. Many fans and critics reacted negatively to the revelation that Principal Skinner, a recurring character since the first episode who had undergone much character development, was an impostor, with some describing it as a jump the shark moment for the series. The episode has been criticized by series creator Matt Groening, and by Skinner's voice actor Harry Shearer. In his 2004 book Planet Simpson, Chris Turner describes the episode as the "broadcast that marked [the] abrupt plunge" from The Simpsons' "Golden Age", while Ian Jones of The Guardian called it the moment the "show became stupid": "Come again? A major character in a long-running series gets unmasked as a fraud? It was cheap, idle storytelling." In a February 2006 article in The Star-Ledger, Alan Sepinwall and Matt Zoller Seitz cite the episode when asserting that the quality of The Simpsons "gets much spottier" in season nine. On the 25th anniversary of the episode airing, Fatherly looked back negatively at the episode, describing the plot twist as the moment the show stopped being perfect, and the ending as mean-spirited.

On the other hand, some episodes of season 9 have largely been praised by critics and fans, including "The City of New York vs. Homer Simpson", which was included in Entertainment Weekly's top 25 list of Simpsons episodes in 2003, and in AskMen's top 10 list of Simpsons episodes in 2006. "The Cartridge Family" appeared in the Herald Sun's list of the show's top 20 episodes in 2007. Lisa Simpson's voice actress, Yeardley Smith, considers "Girly Edition" to be one of her favourite episodes, while Groening considers "Natural Born Kissers" to be one of his. A BBC News writer commented that "the common consensus is that The Simpsons' golden era ended after season nine," while Tyler Wilson of Coeur d'Alene Press has referred to seasons one to nine as the show's "golden age."

== Episodes ==
No. overall	No. in season	Title	Directed by	Written by	Original release date	Prod. code	U.S. viewers (millions)
179	1	"The City of New York vs. Homer Simpson"	Jim Reardon	Ian Maxtone-Graham	September 21, 1997	4F22	17.44
Homer allows Barney to use his car when Barney is picked to be the designated driver for that night at Moe's Tavern. However, Barney disappears for two months with the car, and returns without it. Homer searches for his car, and eventually receives a letter from the City of New York. The family is excited to go there to obtain the car, but Homer, who had had a bad experience in New York when he was younger, is reluctant. After reaching New York City, Homer sees the car parked near the World Trade Center, where he must wait by so that an officer can remove the wheel clamp. He is distracted from standing watch for the police when he has to go the bathroom, and causes him to miss the police officer. Homer gets angry and leaves the city with the clamp on. Note: First appearance of Duffman.
180	2	"The Principal and the Pauper"	Steven Dean Moore	Ken Keeler	September 28, 1997	4F23	14.86
When a celebration is held at Springfield Elementary to honor his 20 years as principal, Principal Skinner is revealed to be an impostor when the real Principal, Sgt. Principal Skinner, shows up. The principal's real name is revealed to be Armin Tamzarian, an orphan from Capital City. Armin soon leaves to return to Capital City, and Sgt. Principal Skinner takes over as principal. However, many, including Agnes Skinner, soon decide they preferred the old Seymour. After persuading him to come back from Capital City to be Principal Skinner again, the townspeople send Sgt. Skinner out of town on a railroad. Guest star: Martin Sheen
181	3	"Lisa's Sax"	Dominic Polcino	Al Jean	October 19, 1997	3F26 3G02	12.85
After being disrupted by Lisa's saxophone practice, Bart gets into a fight with Lisa, ultimately causing her saxophone to be thrown out the window and run over by a Woolworth's truck, flattening it. Lisa is depressed when her sax is flattened. Trying to console her, Homer shares the story of how she got her saxophone. After finishing the story, Homer once again decides to not spend the money on an air conditioner and buys a new saxophone for Lisa instead.
182	4	"Treehouse of Horror VIII"	Mark Kirkland	Mike Scully	October 26, 1997	5F02	19.03
182	4	"Treehouse of Horror VIII"	Mark Kirkland	David X. Cohen	October 26, 1997	5F02	19.03
182	4	"Treehouse of Horror VIII"	Mark Kirkland	Ned Goldreyer	October 26, 1997	5F02	19.03
A Halloween special which is divided into three short stories: The HΩmega Man – After the French strike Springfield with a nuclear bomb, Homer discovers that he is the only one who survived the attack, until mutants come after him. Fly Vs. Fly – Bart uses Professor Frink's teleporter to turn himself into a fly. Easy Bake Coven – In a 1600s Puritan town, Marge is accused of being a witch, which turns out to be true. She flees to her sisters' cave, where the three become the inventors of Halloween.
183	5	"The Cartridge Family"	Pete Michels	John Swartzwelder	November 2, 1997	5F01	18.03
After a large soccer riot leads to an extended period of mob rule throughout Springfield, Homer decides to forgo an expensive security system in favor of a gun. As Marge disapproves of a gun in the house, Homer takes her to an NRA meeting to sell her on the concept. Marge's objections continue, finally forcing Homer to agree to get rid of the weapon. Bart and Milhouse later discover it concealed in the refrigerator. Infuriated and frightened, Marge takes the kids and leaves Homer. With nothing but his gun and his indignation for company, Homer hosts an NRA meeting in his empty house, only to be kicked out of the group when the members themselves acknowledge his reckless and irresponsible treatment of firearms. Thus humbled, Homer seeks out his family to admit his mistake.
184	6	"Bart Star"	Dominic Polcino	Donick Cary	November 9, 1997	5F03	17.91
When the children of Springfield are deemed to be overweight, many parents place their children in the peewee football team, including Bart. Ned is the coach of the team, until he quits after Homer's heckling, which ultimately leads to Homer being the new coach. While being tough on Bart originally, Homer realizes how rough his father was on him when he played sports. This leads Homer to make Bart the quarterback instead of the more skilled Nelson, causing the team to lose a few games and Bart to become angry at his father. Unwilling to make Nelson the quarterback again initially, Homer finally apologizes to Bart for pressuring him and replaces him with Nelson, thus allowing the team to win the championship.
185	7	"The Two Mrs. Nahasapeemapetilons"	Steven Dean Moore	Richard Appel	November 16, 1997	5F04	19.80
After Marge enters Apu into a bachelor auction, many women find an interest in him. However, Apu soon receives a letter from his mother, regarding the arranged marriage he is supposed to have. He does not want to marry the stranger, and following the advice of Homer, tells his mother that he is already married. Curious, his mother comes to America to see his wife, which Homer says Marge can pretend to be. But his mother soon realizes that she is not actually his wife, making the plans for the arranged marriage to continue. Apu becomes depressed until he learns at his wedding that his arranged wife, Manjula, is actually quite lovely.
186	8	"Lisa the Skeptic"	Neil Affleck	David X. Cohen	November 23, 1997	5F05	16.01
Lisa discovers that a shopping mall is going to be built at a site where prehistoric fossils were found. Afraid of there being more prehistoric items at the site, Lisa complains to the developers and starts an archaeological survey at the site. Late into the dig, Lisa unearths a skeleton with bones that resemble wings, similar to an angel's. Despite the whole town believing it to be an angel, Lisa takes a sample of the skeleton and has it tested to see if it is one of a human. The results are inconclusive, leaving Lisa still skeptical. After an interview about her beliefs, there is a town riot against the science community. During the riots, the skeleton is stolen. The town finally discovers it on a hillside with the message, "The End Will Come at Sundown" carved into it. However, the entire ordeal turns out to be publicity stunt that was pulled off by the mall's developers. Surprisingly, the town is not angry, but is instead fascinated by the low prices at the mall.
187	9	"Realty Bites"	Swinton O. Scott III	Dan Greaney	December 7, 1997	5F06	17.73
Homer takes Marge to a police-seized property auction, where he buys a Lil' Bandit. On the ride home, Marge decides to walk because of Homer's erratic driving in the new car. She runs into Lionel Hutz, who is now a realtor. Interested, Marge takes a test to become one, and soon works for a realtor company, Red Blazer Realty. However, after being threatened to be fired for failing to sell any houses, Marge must lie to the Flanders to sell them a house where murders had once taken place. Feeling guilty, Marge tells them the truth after they stay there for a night, which only seems to make them more fascinated in living in the home. Meanwhile, Snake hears about the auction of his car and is so angry that he breaks out of jail to get it back. As he and Homer fight at the power plant, the car crashes into the house, causing the Flanders to move back to their home, and Marge to get fired.
188	10	"Miracle on Evergreen Terrace"	Bob Anderson	Ron Hauge	December 21, 1997	5F07	16.17
On Christmas morning, Bart wakes up earlier than the rest of the family and goes to open his presents. After playing with a remote control firetruck, Bart accidentally starts a fire, causing the plastic Christmas tree and the presents to melt. Bart hides the melted mess, but when the rest of the Simpson family wakes up, Bart reports to the family that there had been a robber. The news media soon reports this, and the community rallies to their aid and donates $15,000, which Homer spends on a car he soon crashes. However, Bart soon tells the truth to his family; that there never was a robber. The community soon finds out, and demands their money back. Marge decides to go on Jeopardy! to make the money back, but does not succeed. When the family comes back home, they find that the town has looted their entire house of everything except a washcloth.
189	11	"All Singing, All Dancing"	Mark Ervin	Steve O'Donnell	January 4, 1998	5F24	15.90
Homer goes out and rents a western movie to watch with his family on the VCR. However, the movie turns out to be a musical, which disgusts Homer. The family reminds Homer of the past times that he has sung and danced in enjoyment, and soon, the family is singing and dancing themselves. Snake enters the house through a window and threatens the family, but decides they would not be good hostages. The family sings once more, and later, Snake comes back, threatening to kill them for putting an annoying tune in his head, but realizes he is out of ammunition and leaves. The family continues to sing, until Snake returns to kill them, but the family tells him they are finished singing. The episode ends with Marge humming nearby the living room window, causing Snake to shoot through it.
190	12	"Bart Carny"	Mark Kirkland	John Swartzwelder	January 11, 1998	5F08	19.21
While the family is at a traveling carnival, Bart accidentally crashes Adolf Hitler's car. To pay off the debts, Homer and Bart get jobs at the carnival by helping with the booths and exhibits, where they befriend Cooder and Spud, a father-and-son carny team. Homer causes their booth to get shut down, when he does not recognize the bribe Chief Wiggum was asking for. Homer decides to allow the two carnies to stay at his home. The next day, the family goes to a glass bottom boat ride with the tickets Cooder gave them, only to discover their house has been taken over by the two carnies when they return. After brainstorming on how to get the house back, Homer decides to make Cooder a deal: If Homer can get a hula hoop around the house's chimney, he can have his house back, but if he does not, he will sign the deed of the house to Cooder. However, the family fool the two carnies, and rush back into the house before the two can do anything. Guest star: Jim Varney
191	13	"The Joy of Sect"	Steven Dean Moore	Steve O'Donnell	February 8, 1998	5F23	16.20
After encountering two recruiters of a sect called "The Movementarians", Homer attends a session that teaches about their sect, where he is brainwashed to join. Homer moves the entire family to their compound, where the entire family, except Marge, is brainwashed. Marge escapes through a dangerous getaway, and finds Reverend Lovejoy, Ned Flanders and Groundskeeper Willie for help. The four manage to kidnap the family back. They are able to persuade Lisa and Bart to not believe in the sect anymore, but are unable to get Homer back, as the sect's lawyers take him back before they are able to. However, Homer no longer believes in the sect when he arrives, and manages to expose them as fake. The group then disbands, and the family goes back home.
192	14	"Das Bus"	Pete Michels	David X. Cohen	February 15, 1998	5F11	15.98
As the students of Springfield Elementary are being driven to a model UN conference, Otto drives the bus off a bridge after his brake pedal is blocked by a grapefruit. To obtain help, Otto swims off, while the kids are still in the bus. Soon, when the bus is nearly full of water, the kids manage to escape and swim to an island. Once there, the kids find no food, causing Bart to swim back to the sunken bus to get the cooler full of food. Lisa advises everyone to not eat much, as it may be the only food they could have for some time. However, the cooler is found empty the next morning, with the food wrappings discarded around Milhouse, who claims a monster ate it. Lisa champions the charter of the Model UN and insists on giving Milhouse a trial, wherein he is found innocent. The verdict angers the kids, however, inciting violence against Lisa, Milhouse, and Bart, who are forced to flee. The three hide in a cave, but are chased out by a boar, which is soon found out to be the "monster". The kids kill the boar and eat it, and a narration assures that Moe saves the kids. Meanwhile, Homer starts his own internet company, but it is eventually destroyed by Bill Gates.
193	15	"The Last Temptation of Krust"	Mike B. Anderson	Donick Cary	February 22, 1998	5F10	16.50
After a rude awakening to his own hackneyed and dated comedy act, Krusty does some heavy drinking and wakes up in front of the Flanders' house. Bart takes him inside his house and into his room, where Krusty, looking at all the Krusty merchandise, realizes that he has sold out instead of focusing on comedy. Bart invites Jay Leno to help clean up Krusty, and modernize his jokes. However, Krusty's attempts fail, causing him to announce his retirement. During his announcement, the group of reporters find his tirade against modern comedians hilarious, influencing Krusty to try a hipper, more honest blend of comedy and social criticism. Although he becomes a popular comedian again, Krusty ends up selling out once more when some advertisers bribe him to endorse a car, in return for a free one.
194	16	"Dumbbell Indemnity"	Dominic Polcino	Ron Hauge	March 1, 1998	5F12	17.35
After several unsuccessful attempts at getting a girlfriend, Moe finally gets one after walking away from a disco with Homer. The woman, Renee, surprisingly finds Moe attractive, resulting in Moe treating her lavishly. After spending too much, Moe's credit card maxes out, causing him to become desperate for money. He soon devises a plan to have Homer steal his car and crash it to accomplish insurance fraud. Homer gets caught and ends up in jail. With the insurance money, Moe decides not to bail Homer out of jail, but instead take a Hawaiian vacation with Renee. After finding out, Homer escapes and decides to find Moe for revenge. Meanwhile, Moe confesses the truth to Renee, who is happy at first, but is disgusted with him after his plans to free Homer involve lying again. Renee leaves Moe, then he accidentally starts a fire at his tavern. At the same time, Homer comes to fight Moe, but both faint from smoke inhalation. Finally, Barney comes and saves the two, and Homer allows Moe to temporarily run his bar at the Simpsons' house.
195	17	"Lisa the Simpson"	Susie Dietter	Ned Goldreyer	March 8, 1998	4F24	17.79
Soon after being unable to solve a brain-teaser that several others at school were able to solve, and forgetting some of her day to day tasks, Lisa learns from Grampa that the Simpsons have a long history of losing their intelligence in late childhood. Lisa soon realizes that she cannot escape genetics, and accepts that she will soon be very unintelligent. After realizing the importance of sharing what you can with the world while you still have the chance, she lies her way onto a news broadcast to deliver a message on treasuring your brain. Homer sees this and, upon learning what Abe told her, attempts to disprove the theory of the "Simpson gene" by gathering every Simpson in the area together to showcase their merits. It is quickly apparent that Homer did not research this project much, as many of his guests prove to be simpletons, deadbeats, and stooges. Lisa's salvation only comes when she begins to meet the Simpson women, including a doctor who then informs Lisa that the defective "Simpson gene" is located only on the Y-chromosome. Re-validated, Lisa celebrates that she is once again herself, an event aptly crowned when she finally manages to solve the brain-teaser that so plagued her. Meanwhile, Apu finds out that Jasper has locked himself inside a freezer at the Kwik-E-Mart and decides to turn it into a freak house.
196	18	"This Little Wiggy"	Neil Affleck	Dan Greaney	March 22, 1998	5F13	14.96
When Marge realizes that Ralph Wiggum has no friends, she volunteers Bart to be his friend. Initially unwilling, Bart discovers that Ralph's father, Chief Wiggum, owns a key that opens every lock in Springfield. The two go out at night and open many places to have fun, but soon encounter bullies Nelson, Dolph, Jimbo, and Kearney. The four pressure Bart and Ralph to sneak into an abandoned prison, but Bart decides not to when he sees that Ralph is scared. The key is thrown over into the prison by the trouble-makers, causing Bart and Ralph to go retrieve it. While in the prison, the two find an old electric chair, which they turn on to see if it still works, and later go home. The next day, Mayor Quimby announces the prison is reopened, and decides to demonstrate what criminals could face by sitting in the, unknown to the police and the mayor, active chair. Bart rushes to Ralph for help to tell the mayor that the chair is active, leading Lisa to fire a small rocket with a note attached to the prison. The rocket misses and crashes into the power plant. Mr. Burns responds and, upon realizing the prison has been using free electricity, turns off the power, saving the mayor.
197	19	"Simpson Tide"	Milton Gray	Joshua Sternin & Jennifer Ventimilia	March 29, 1998	3G04	14.77
Homer is fired from the Nuclear Power Plant following a near meltdown, and decides to join the Naval Reserve. Meanwhile, Bart decides to get an earring. Homer graduates from basic training, and must go off on a mission of war games, but not before taking Bart's earring, which he disapproves of. Later, on the submarine, Homer befriends the Captain, who leaves him in charge when he goes to check a blocked torpedo. Homer believes the ship is being fired at, and launches a torpedo, accidentally ejecting the Captain. Homer eventually gets the submarine lost, and is considered a traitor by the media. The United States Navy fires at the submarine, causing a leak which Homer stops with Bart's earring. The submarine is soon surfaced, and Homer is taken into custody by the Navy. However, he escapes any trouble due to the Navy judges having to resign over various scandals that they are involved in. Homer then leaves the Navy with a dishonorable discharge.
198	20	"The Trouble with Trillions"	Swinton O. Scott III	Ian Maxtone-Graham	April 5, 1998	5F14	11.39
Forgetting to do his annual income taxes until the night they are due, Homer rushes to fill out his forms with false information. Soon after, he is arrested for tax fraud, but makes a deal to work for the FBI for immunity from the IRS's prosecutions. After a successful operation made by Homer, the FBI decides to have Homer obtain a one trillion dollar bill that is in the hands of Montgomery Burns. Homer leads Mr. Burns to believe that he is a reporter, causing Mr. Burns to show him the bill. The FBI rushes into the mansion and arrests Mr. Burns, but Homer decides to rescue him. Mr. Burns gets the help of Waylon Smithers, and with Homer, the three escape in Mr. Burns' plane. Looking for an island to buy, Mr. Burns decides to land in Cuba, where the three meet Fidel Castro. Castro does not wish to sell Cuba, but is interested in seeing the trillion dollar bill. However, after he is handed the bill, he decides to not return it. The show ends with the three on a raft back to the United States.
199	21	"Girly Edition"	Mark Kirkland	Larry Doyle	April 19, 1998	5F15	13.46
Lisa becomes a news anchor of a children's news segment on the "Krusty the Clown Show" when the channel discovers that it requires some educational programming. Meanwhile, Bart destroys Groundskeeper Willie's shack after he takes away Bart's skateboard. Later, Marge makes Lisa allow Bart to be the sports anchor, but after the channel sees Bart's success, they promote him to co-anchor. To prove to Lisa that he is a good anchor, Bart starts to produce "Bart's People", which are human interest stories, a news segment that becomes extremely popular. Resentful of his success, Lisa sends Bart a fake letter. In it, she pretends to be an immigrant who lost his home. Seeing an opportunity, Bart rushes to the landfill to do a live "Bart's People", only to discover that the immigrant was actually Groundskeeper Willie, who goes after Bart. Seeing what she did, Lisa rushes to save Bart, and is able to persuade Willie to let Bart go, using the emotion striking techniques Bart used in his segments.
200	22	"Trash of the Titans"	Jim Reardon	Ian Maxtone-Graham	April 26, 1998	5F09	17.35
When Homer is unable to take all of his trash to the curb, barely missing the garbage truck, Homer insults the garbage men, leading the family to have their garbage collection service cut off. After the house collects a huge amount of trash, Marge writes an apology letter to the sanitary commission, signing with Homer's name. However, Homer finds out and goes to city hall to rescind it. Following an angry meeting with the commissioner, Homer decides to run for his position. Homer's campaigning fails to win much support, until he promises the town that they will no longer need to do any garbage-related work. This causes Homer to win in a landslide. Initially, Homer is able is keep his promise, but he uses an entire year's budget in a month, causing the workers to go on strike, fearing they will not be paid. Homer makes a deal with neighboring towns to dump their trash in Springfield's abandoned mines to make money, but when the mines are filled, trash starts to burst out of the ground. The town is then forced to completely move five miles away. Note 1: This is the show's 200th episode. Note 2: This episode was dedicated to Linda McCartney.
201	23	"King of the Hill"	Steven Dean Moore	John Swartzwelder	May 3, 1998	5F16	14.80
Bart becomes disappointed with his father after he fails miserably in a game of Capture the Flag. Thus shamed, Homer decides to go to a gym every night to exercise, while eating an energy bar called "Powersauce" and being trained by Rainier Wolfcastle. In time Homer develops quite the impressive build, so much so that when Wolfcastle refuses two Powersauce representatives when they ask him to climb Springfield's tallest mountain, the Murderhorn, Homer is the one to take over this publicity stunt. To make sure Homer gets to the top, the company hires two Sherpas to drag Homer up the mountain during the night. However, Homer soon realizes the Sherpas are doing this, and fires them so that he can climb solo. After much climbing, Homer believes he has finally made it to the top, but then sees that he has only made it to a plateau of the mountain. Feeling that he cannot climb any higher, Homer places a flag where he is. This creates a crack which breaks the top of the mountain off, making the plateau where Homer is standing become the peak. After climbing back down, Bart shows that he is proud of his father again.
202	24	"Lost Our Lisa"	Pete Michels	Brian Scully	May 10, 1998	5F17	12.86
When Bart comes home with some novelty items superglued to his face, Marge takes him to the emergency room, spoiling Lisa's chance to go the Springfield Museum to catch the last day of the Isis Exhibit. Marge forbids Lisa to take public transportation to the museum by herself, but Lisa is able to manipulate her father for his permission to take the bus. However, Lisa takes the wrong bus and ends up in the middle of nowhere. Meanwhile, Homer realizes that he should not have given Lisa permission to take the bus by herself. He rushes to the museum to find her, but she has managed to get downtown after much travel. Near the museum, Homer decides to use a cherry picker to locate Lisa, but the cherry picker loses control and falls into the pier, and floats off to a drawbridge. Lisa sees this, and quickly tells the bridge operator to lower the bridge, which catches Homer by his head to save him. The exhibit is closed, but Homer promises to break into the museum at night with Lisa, where the two discover one of the exhibits' objects is a musical box.
203	25	"Natural Born Kissers"	Klay Hall	Matt Selman	May 17, 1998	5F18	14.12
Homer and Marge go out on their anniversary dinner, but are forced to take the kids. They end up having an unromantic dinner, and lose interest in being intimate later that night. Later, the two must go purchase a new refrigerator motor, but during a rainstorm, their car gets stuck in the mud, so the two rush into a barn. When the farm owner nearly discovers them, the two become excited and have sex. When they return home, they decide to spend a weekend at a bed and breakfast, but when they are there, they find themselves romantically uninspired once again, until a maid discovers them on a bed. They then realize that the fear of getting caught makes them excited. Later, they decide to go to a miniature golf course to have sex in the windmill there, just like they did when they were younger. The people there soon realize there is something inside the windmill, and the two barely manage to escape unseen. However, the people see their underwear, and realize someone was there. To get home, the nude couple steals a hot air balloon, but they accidentally wind up landing on a football field full of people. Homer and Marge travel back home, and are in the newspaper the next day.

== Nielsen ratings ==
In terms of households, the show ranked just outside the Top 30, coming in at #32 with a 9.3 household rating and a 15 percent audience share. In terms of total viewers however, the show ranked inside the Top 20, coming in at #18 for the season, (tying with Dateline Tuesday) and being watched by an average of 15.3 million viewers per episode.

== DVD release ==
The Simpsons season 9 DVD digipak, special Lisa head edition

The DVD boxset for season nine was released by 20th Century Fox Home Entertainment in the United States and Canada on December 19, 2006, eight years after it had completed broadcast on television. As well as every episode from the season, the DVD release features bonus material including deleted scenes, animatics, and commentaries for every episode. As with the two preceding seasons, the set was released in two different packagings: A "Collector's Edition" plastic packaging molded to look like Lisa's head, and a standard rectangular cardboard box featuring Lisa with a backstage pass to a show at a club. The menus continue the same format from the previous four seasons, and the overall theme is various characters waiting in line at a club.

The Complete Ninth Season
Set Details			Special Features
25 episodes; 4-disc set; 1.33:1 aspect ratio; AUDIO; English 5.1 Dolby Digital; Spanish 2.0 Dolby Surround; French 2.0 Dolby Surround; SUBTITLES; English SDH; Spanish			Optional commentaries for all 25 episodes; Introduction from Matt Groening; Deleted Scenes; The City of New York vs. Homer Simpson; Lisa's Sax; Treehouse of Horror VIII; The Two Mrs. Nahasapeemapetilons; Lisa the Skeptic; Bart Carny; The Joy of Sect; Das Bus; The Last Temptation of Krust; Dumbbell Indemnity; Lisa the Simpson; This Little Wiggy; Simpson Tide; Girly Edition; Trash of the Titans; King of the Hill; Special Language Feature; Trash of the Titans; Polish 2.0 Dolby Surround; Portuguese 2.0 Dolby Surround; German 2.0 Dolby Surround; Japanese 2.0 Dolby Surround; Animation Showcase; The Principal and the Pauper; Lisa the Simpson; Illustrated commentary; All Singing, All Dancing; Lost Our Lisa; Commercials; Butterfinger - Aliens; Butterfinger - Hit a Homer; Butterfinger BB's - Philosophy; CC's Chips - Parachutist; CC's Chips - Homerdini; "Sneak peek" at The Simpsons Movie; Sketch Gallery
Release Dates
Region 1	Region 2	Region 4	
December 19, 2006	January 29, 2007	March 21, 2007	

== See also ==
- List of The Simpsons episodes
