= Lost Our Lisa =

- The Simpsons episode
- Episode no.: Season 9 Episode 24
- Directed by: Pete Michels
- Written by: Brian Scully
- Production code: 5F17
- Original air date: May 10, 1998

Episode features
- Chalkboard gag: "I am not the new Dalai Lama"
- Couch gag: The Simpsons attempt to sit down, only for the couch to suddenly move back on its own, Nelson Muntz appears, revealing that he had secretly moved it for a prank against the family as he then mocks them for falling for it.
- Commentary: Matt Groening; Mike Scully; George Meyer; David X. Cohen; Yeardley Smith; Pete Michels

Episode chronology
← Previous "King of the Hill"	Next → "Natural Born Kissers"
- The Simpsons season 9

"Lost Our Lisa" is the twenty-fourth and penultimate episode of the ninth season of the American animated television series The Simpsons. It originally aired on Fox in the United States on May 10, 1998. The episode contains the last appearance of the character Lionel Hutz, albeit in a non-speaking role (his last speaking appearance is the earlier episode "Realty Bites"). When Lisa learns that Marge cannot give her a ride to the museum and forbids her to take the bus, she deceives Homer into giving her permission. After Lisa gets lost, Homer goes looking for her and the duo end up visiting the museum together.

The episode is analyzed in the books Planet Simpson, The Psychology of the Simpsons: D'oh! and The Simpsons and Philosophy: The D'oh! of Homer and received positive mention in I Can't Believe It's a Bigger and Better Updated Unofficial Simpsons Guide.

== Plot ==
Bart and Milhouse visit a joke shop, where Bart tries out some novelty props for his face. Finding that they will not stay on, Bart sticks them to his face using superglue borrowed from Homer. Bart returns home as Marge and Lisa are preparing to leave for the Springsonian Museum for the last day of its Egyptian Treasures of Isis exhibit. However, when Marge sees what Bart has done, she rushes him to the emergency room and is therefore unable to drive Lisa to the exhibit. Dismayed, Lisa asks Marge if she can take a bus to the museum, which Marge forbids, since it is too dangerous for Lisa to do on her own at her age. Dr. Hibbert examines Bart and scares him with the threat of spinal injections, resulting in Bart's terrified sweat dissolving the glue.

Meanwhile Lisa calls Homer at the power plant and deceives him into giving her permission to go on a bus. However, Lisa boards the wrong one, with its unsympathetic driver dropping her off in the middle of nowhere. Initially, Lisa tries to find her own way back to Springfield, but ends up increasingly lost and scared. Back at the plant, Homer tells Lenny and Carl that he let Lisa ride a bus alone. When they point out the error of his judgment, he leaves work to go look for her. The duo eventually find each other in Springfield's previously unseen Russian District, where Homer uses a cherrypicker to see from higher up. Lisa subsequently saves him when the cherrypicker falls into a river.

Ashamed at her naiveté and for causing Homer grief, Lisa tells him she will never do anything so risky again, whereas Homer instead encourages her to take more risks in life. To prove his point, he offers to take Lisa to finally see the Isis exhibit by infiltrating the now-closed museum. There, they see the mysterious Orb of Isis, whose purpose has so far eluded archeologists. Homer accidentally knocks the orb onto the floor and it splits open, revealing itself to be a music box. Lisa concludes that what her father said about risks was right – until the alarm goes off and guard dogs chase them out of the building.

== Production ==
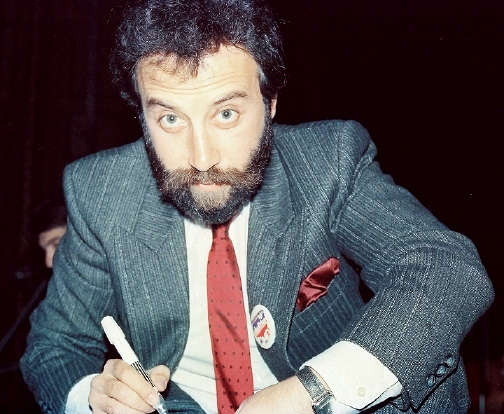
Comedian Yakov Smirnoff helped with the Russian translations in the episode.

Writer Mike Scully came up with the idea for the plot because he used to live in West Springfield, Massachusetts and he would ask his parents if he could take the bus to Springfield, Massachusetts and they finally agreed to let him one day. The production team faced several challenges during development of this episode. The animators had to come up with a special mouth chart to draw Bart's mouth with the joke teeth in. The pile of dead animals in the back of Cletus' truck originally included dead puppies, but the animators thought it was too sad, so they removed them. Scully used to write jokes for Yakov Smirnoff, so he called him up to get the signs in Russian. Dan Castellaneta had to learn proper Russian pronunciation, so he could speak it during the chess scene in which he voiced the Russian chess player. The Khlav Kalash vendor from "The City of New York vs. Homer Simpson" makes an appearance.

In the season 9 DVD release of the episode, The Simpsons animators use a telestrator to show similarities between Krusty and Homer in the episode. This episode contains the last showing of character Lionel Hutz. He is seen standing at the bus stop with Lisa, but does not speak. Due to Phil Hartman's death, the recurring characters of Lionel Hutz and Troy McClure were retired.

== Themes ==
In his book Planet Simpson, Chris Turner cites Lisa's experiences on the bus as an example of "satirical laughs scored at the expense of Lisa's idealism". "Lost Our Lisa" is cited in The Simpsons and Philosophy: The D'oh! of Homer along with episodes "Lisa the Iconoclast", "Lisa the Beauty Queen", and "Lisa's Sax", in order to illustrate Homer's "success bonding with Lisa".

In The Psychology of the Simpsons: D'oh!, the authors utilize statements made by Homer in the episode to analyze the difference between heuristic and algorithmic decision-making. Homer explains to Lisa, "Stupid risks are what make life worth living. Now your mother, she's the steady type and that's fine in small doses, but me, I'm a risk-taker. That's why I have so many adventures!" The authors of The Psychology of The Simpsons interpret this statement by Homer to mean that he "relies on his past experiences of taking massive, death-defying risks and winding up okay to justify forging ahead in the most extreme circumstances".

The episode is another featuring Homer's near invulnerability to head injury, previously explained in "The Homer They Fall".

== Reception ==
In its original broadcast, "Lost Our Lisa" finished 45th in ratings for the week of May 4–10, 1998, with a Nielsen rating of 7.8, equivalent to approximately 7.6 million viewing households. It was the fourth highest-rated show on the Fox network that week, following The X-Files, Ally McBeal, and King of the Hill.

Warren Martyn and Adrian Wood write positively of the episode in their book I Can't Believe It's a Bigger and Better Updated Unofficial Simpsons Guide: "A smashing episode, loads of good jokes and clever situations ... and best of all, Lisa working intelligently. The teaming up of father and daughter has rarely been more enjoyable and lovely. Gives you a warm feeling." A review of The Simpsons season 9 DVD release in the Daily Post notes that it includes "super illustrated colour commentaries" on "All Singing, All Dancing" and "Lost Our Lisa".
