= Girly Edition =

- The Simpsons episode
- Episode no.: Season 9 Episode 21
- Directed by: Mark Kirkland
- Written by: Larry Doyle
- Production code: 5F15
- Original air date: April 19, 1998

Episode features
- Couch gag: The family sits down and Matt Groening's live-action hand spins the picture, causing it to blur.
- Commentary: Matt Groening; Mike Scully; George Meyer; Yeardley Smith; Mark Kirkland

Episode chronology
← Previous "The Trouble with Trillions"	Next → "Trash of the Titans"
- The Simpsons season 9

"Girly Edition" is the twenty-first episode in the ninth season of the American animated television series The Simpsons. It originally aired on Fox in the United States on April 19, 1998. In the episode, Lisa and Bart must co-anchor a new news program, though when Bart is seen as a more successful news anchor, Lisa becomes jealous and seeks revenge. Meanwhile, in the subplot, Homer gets a monkey helper because of his laziness.

"Girly Edition" was the first episode written by Larry Doyle and was directed by Mark Kirkland. Much of the subplot was inspired by the film Monkey Shines.

Critics gave the episode positive reviews and it is also one of Yeardley Smith's favorite episodes of the series.

== Plot ==
After Groundskeeper Willie takes away Bart's skateboard for destroying his leaf pile, Bart gets revenge on Willie by filling up his shack with creamed corn as he is sleeping, destroying it. As Willie is taken away for medical attention, he swears his own revenge on Bart. Meanwhile, Krusty the Clown's show comes under criticism by the Federal Communications Commission for not being educational enough for children. The Channel 6 executive proposes that Krusty cut 10 minutes from his show to make room for a kids' news program, Kidz Newz, where children deliver and report news items. Lisa is recruited as a news anchor along with other Springfield Elementary School children. Bart is not chosen at first, but is made sportscaster after he complains to Marge.

Lisa is deemed to be boring by the channel's staff, though they are impressed by Bart's performance. Bart is then promoted to be the co-anchor, causing Lisa to become jealous and resentful. After Bart hears Lisa talking behind his back, he seeks advice from Kent Brockman, who teaches him about the power of human interest stories. Bart becomes successful after creating a segment called "Bart's People", which Lisa disapproves of due to its sappy, emotionally manipulative content. She attempts to copy the segment, but is twice hampered by the Crazy Cat Lady. In a plot to expose Bart's insincerity, she writes and sends a letter, purportedly from an immigrant living in a junkyard who wants to be featured as one of Bart's People. Bart rushes to the city dump to do a live broadcast but is attacked by Willie, who has been living there since his shack was destroyed. Feeling guilty for putting Bart in danger, Lisa hurries to the dump and saves him by using some of his own methods to appeal to Willie's emotions. Bart and Lisa decide to combine their talents in order to get children to really care about the news, only to have Kidz Newz canceled immediately afterward and replaced by a cartoon show intended to sell candy and toys.

The subplot of the episode involves Homer discovering that Apu has been wounded in a robbery at the Kwik-E-Mart and has obtained a helper monkey to assist in running the store while he recovers. Homer gets a monkey of his own named Mojo to help around the house (by using Grampa as a stopgap after being told that monkeys can only assist the physically challenged or the elderly), but Mojo instead picks up Homer's bad habits and becomes lazy and overweight. At Marge's insistence, Homer returns Mojo to the agency that provided him. Mojo communicates via his tablet and says “Pray for Mojo”.

== Production ==
"Girly Edition" was the first episode Larry Doyle wrote for the show. He conceived both the main plot and the subplot. The subplot about Mojo was inspired by the film Monkey Shines; show runner Mike Scully asked the staff to consult the film for reference when they were making the episode. The animators also studied the behavior of monkeys from other resources, looking at their movements and how they interact with humans. Eric Stefani, a former animator for the show who had left and now was part of the band No Doubt, was called back by episode director Mark Kirkland to animate the scenes with Homer and Mojo. This was the final work Stefani did for The Simpsons. At the end of the episode, an incapacitated Mojo is only able to type "Pray for Mojo" into a computer; this line was written by George Meyer, who cited it as his favorite personal contribution to The Simpsons. Recurring character the Crazy Cat Lady was introduced in this episode.

== Analysis ==
The show that replaces "Kidz News", a parody of corporate tie-in Saturday morning cartoons

In his book Watching with The Simpsons: Television, Parody, and Intertextuality, Jonathan Gray analyses a scene from the episode in which it is announced that Kidz News has been replaced by the children's cartoon The Mattel and Mars Bar Quick Energy Chocobot Hour (a reference to the Mattel toys and the Mars chocolate bar). He says this mocks "how many children's programs have become little more than the ad to the merchandise". Gray also writes that The Simpsons "illustrates how the ad as genre has itself already invaded many, if not all, genres. Ads and marketing do not limit themselves to the space between programs; rather, they are themselves textual invaders, and part of The Simpsons' parodic attack on ads involves revealing their hiding places in other texts."

A real-life journalist named Reid, who Gray interviewed for his book, states that "Girly Edition" mirrors well how some journalists actually work. She said the episode shows "the ludicrous nature of, you know, what we do in a lot of things. The kids news with Bart and Lisa: I mean, you see them do really stupid stories about the news, and 'news you can use,' and 'how to get rid of your sheets when you wet them.' I mean, people really do stories like that." Steven Keslowitz writes in his book The World According to the Simpsons that the episode showcases the fact that "the viewing of attractive newscasters and the use of persuasive tones of voice often do have an impact on the minds of many intelligent members of American society."

== Reception ==
The episode originally aired on the Fox network in the United States on April 19, 1998. It finished 26th in the ratings for the week of April 13–19, 1998, with a Nielsen rating of 8.7, translating to around 8.5 million viewing households. The episode was the third highest rated show on Fox that week, following The X-Files and King of the Hill.

"Girly Edition" was well received by critics.

The authors of the book I Can't Believe It's a Bigger and Better Updated Unofficial Simpsons Guide, Warren Martyn and Adrian Wood, thought well of the episode, calling it "a great episode, full of more than the normal quota of good jokes", adding, "best of all is Lisa's revenge on Bart, and the mad cat-lady who goes around chucking her cats at people."

Ryan Keefer of DVD Verdict gave the episode a B rating and stated that he enjoyed the subplot with Mojo more than the main plot.

Colin Jacobson of DVD Movie Guide commented that "Girly Edition" takes "a clever concept and turns into something more than expected as it digs into the usual Bart/Lisa rivalry. I'm not quite sure why Bart reacts so sadly to Lisa's comments about his stupidity when 'Lisa the Simpson' just delved into the dumbness of the male Simpsons. There's enough to like here to make the episode fun, though."

This episode is one of Yeardley Smith's favorites. She says, "I don't actually remember a lot of the episodes because they all blend in together for me, and I don't have a really good memory anyway, but I do remember this one and thinking that it was terrific."

Alasdair Wilkins writes "it's really hard to argue too hard with the charms of an episode that gives us both Mojo and old Joe and his ducks. As a parody of news shows, it's so close to the real thing as to almost not be parody at all."

The title of the Mustard Plug album Pray for Mojo is derived from the episode.
