= The Trouble with Trillions =

- The Simpsons episode
- Episode no.: Season 9 Episode 20
- Directed by: Swinton O. Scott III
- Written by: Ian Maxtone-Graham
- Production code: 5F14
- Original air date: April 5, 1998

Guest appearance
- Paul Winfield as Lucius Sweet

Episode features
- Chalkboard gag: "I will not demand what I'm worth"
- Couch gag: The living room is a sauna, with three men in towels relaxing. The Simpsons (also in towels) arrive, but leave sheepishly as the three men glare at them.
- Commentary: Matt Groening; Mike Scully; George Meyer; Ian Maxtone-Graham; Swinton O. Scott III; Matt Selman

Episode chronology
← Previous "Simpson Tide"	Next → "Girly Edition"
- The Simpsons season 9

"The Trouble with Trillions" (Note: Titled "Trouble With Trillions," omitting the leading article, on Disney+) is the twentieth episode in the ninth season of the American animated television series The Simpsons. It originally aired on Fox in the United States on April 5, 1998. It was written by Ian Maxtone-Graham and directed by Swinton O. Scott III. The episode sees Homer being sent by the Federal Bureau of Investigation to try to obtain a trillion dollar bill that Mr. Burns failed to deliver to Europe during the post-war era.

== Plot ==
All of Springfield celebrates the arrival of the New Year except for Ned Flanders, who instead focuses on filing his tax returns. A few months later, as all of Springfield rushes to send out their returns just before midnight on April 15, Homer realizes he did not file his, believing he didn't need to do it every year. He rushes and provides false information before delivering it to the post office. However, at the IRS the somewhat spherical package containing Homer's tax returns bounces into a "Severe Audit" bin, and the government arrests him for tax fraud. To avoid prison, Homer agrees to help Agent Johnson of the FBI. With a hidden microphone under his shirt, Homer uncovers that his coworker Charlie is leading a militia planning to assault all government officials, and has him arrested by the FBI for conspiracy.

Impressed, Johnson reveals to Homer that in 1945, President Harry S. Truman printed a one trillion-dollar bill to help reconstruct post-war Western Europe and enlisted Montgomery Burns to transport the bill. However, it never arrived and the FBI suspects Burns still has it with him. Homer is sent in to investigate. At the Burns estate, Homer searches for the bill before Burns, who believes Homer is a reporter from Collier's magazine, reveals that he keeps it in his wallet. Johnson and Agent Miller burst in and arrest Burns for grand, grand, grand, grand larceny. Insisting he's innocent, Burns protests that the government oppresses the average American. Moved by Burns' speech, Homer knocks out the FBI agents and frees Burns.

The two men go to Smithers, who suggests they leave the country. Burns takes Smithers and Homer in his old plane, setting off to find an island and start a new country. The three land in Cuba and appear before Fidel Castro. Burns tries to buy the island, but Castro foils his plan when he asks to see the trillion-dollar bill and then refuses to give it back. Later, Burns, Smithers, and Homer are on a makeshift raft. Smithers asks whether Burns will be facing jail time; Burns replies that, if it is a crime to love one's country or steal a trillion dollars or bribe a jury, he is guilty.

== Production ==
The episode was written by Ian Maxtone-Graham, though the original draft of the plot was much different. Originally, Homer was to learn that he was a Native American, and would try to exploit it to not have to pay taxes. The idea had been going well for a few days, but the staff did not actually know whether Native Americans had to pay taxes. When the writers found out that they did, the whole plot had to be scrapped. Executive producer Mike Scully's brother Brian pitched the idea of the trillion-dollar bill, which they accepted, as they were out of ideas.

== Cultural references ==
The episode's title is a reference to the 1967 Star Trek episode "The Trouble with Tribbles".

The scene where the FBI agent sits near Homer on a bench in the park is a reference to the 1991 film JFK.

While Homer, Mr. Burns, and Smithers are in Cuba, a billboard can be seen with a picture of Marxist revolutionary Che Guevara being used to advertise Duff Beer.

== Reception ==
In its original broadcast, "The Trouble with Trillions" finished 51st in ratings for the week of March 30–April 5, 1998, with a Nielsen rating of 7.5, equivalent to approximately 7.4 million viewing households. It was the third highest-rated show on the Fox network that week, following World's Wildest Police Videos and Melrose Place.

Since airing, the episode has received mixed reviews from television critics. The authors of the book I Can't Believe It's a Bigger and Better Updated Unofficial Simpsons Guide, Warren Martyn and Adrian Wood, did not enjoy the episode, calling it, "Rather dull and unfunny", adding, "A mediocre episode at best that makes Burns out to be altruistic (which he's not) and very stupid in letting Castro have his money (which he so wouldn't)." The Daily Telegraph characterized the episode as one of "The 10 Best Simpsons TV Episodes". The article noted the episode contained "one of the few gags in comedy history about relying too heavily on surveillance photography in spying".

Ian Jones and Steve Williams for Off the Telly criticized all of season 9 for lacking an episode that centered on Burns, as they consider Burns to be the crux of many good episodes, though they noted that "The Trouble with Trillions" came the closest, with Burns having a supporting role. In a review of The Simpsons' ninth season, Isaac Mitchell-Frey of the Herald Sun described the episode as "brilliant", and highlighted it along with episodes "Bart Carny" and "The Joy of Sect".

In the United Kingdom, the episode was screened on BBC Two in January 1999, before any other episode from season six or later were seen by viewers on the channel, as part of a night of Cuba-themed programming. The episode had made its UK premiere in June 1998, by the program's primary rights holder in the country, Sky One.

Alasdair Wilkins writes "Given The Simpsons' longstanding fondness for doing a self-contained first act that connects only tenuously with the main story—seriously, they were making fun of themselves for that at least as far back as season 12's 'Tennis The Menace,' which aired nearly 15 years ago—there's no shortage of candidates for the story that travels farthest from beginning to end. But of all the great shaggy dog stories in the show's long history, few can rival what we get in 'The Trouble With Trillions,' which starts with Springfield celebrating New Year's and ends with Homer, Mr. Burns, and Smithers on a raft, drifting in the middle of the Caribbean Sea. The episode is a good example of the show's skill at comedic escalation, starting with some relatively—at least by the show's standards—grounded riffing on the scourge of tax day and then moving into a cockeyed caper about Mr. Burns stealing a trillion dollars from the government, all in the form of a single Harry S Truman-approved bill."

== See also ==
- "The Trouble with Tribbles", an episode of Star Trek
- Large denominations of United States currency
- Trillion-dollar coin
- Taxation in the United States
- Marshall Plan
- JFK (1991)
- Cuba
- Cuba–United States relations
