= Dumbbell Indemnity =

- The Simpsons episode
- Moe and Renee at the police moonlight ball
- Episode no.: Season 9 Episode 17
- Directed by: Dominic Polcino
- Written by: Ron Hauge
- Production code: 5F12
- Original air date: March 1, 1998

Guest appearance
- Helen Hunt as Renee

Episode features
- Chalkboard gag: "Silly string is not a nasal spray"
- Couch gag: The Simpsons sit on the couch, and hydraulic presses crush them into a cube.
- Commentary: Matt Groening; Mike Scully; George Meyer; Ron Hauge; Ian Maxtone-Graham; Dominic Polcino

Episode chronology
← Previous "The Last Temptation of Krust"	Next → "Lisa the Simpson"
- The Simpsons season 9

"Dumbbell Indemnity" is the sixteenth episode of the ninth season of the American animated television series The Simpsons. It originally aired on Fox in the United States on March 1, 1998. It was written by Ron Hauge and directed by Dominic Polcino. The episode sees Moe spending large amounts of money to impress his new girlfriend, which leads him to commit insurance fraud once his finances begin to dwindle. Homer helps him, but is caught and sent to jail, and attempts to take revenge on Moe when he does not bail him out. Helen Hunt makes a guest appearance as Moe's girlfriend, Renee. The episode contains several cultural references and was generally well received.

== Plot ==
With Moe Szyslak depressed at having gone four years without a date, Homer takes him to meet a woman at Stu's Disco, but he fails to do so. Further resigned to his misery, Moe starts a conversation with a flower vendor named Renee and ends up asking her out. Moe and Renee seem to form a strong relationship, but Moe is insecure about his hold on her and feels he must spend large amounts of money so she will stay with him.

In need of more money once his Player's Club card gets maxed out and he scares off his customers after calling in their bar tabs, Moe concocts a scheme to commit insurance fraud, convincing Homer to steal his car and park it on train tracks so it will be destroyed. The night the scheme is supposed to take place, Moe and Renee attend a police charity event aboard a yacht; the event's attendance by all the officers in town ensures Homer will not get caught perpetrating the scheme, and gives Moe an alibi so that no one will suspect he was behind the act. Homer botches the plan by stopping to watch a drive-in movie, missing the train that was supposed to destroy Moe's car. Instead, Homer drives the car off a cliff, but is unable to escape and sinks into the water near the yacht where the police charity event is taking place.

Moe gets the insurance payout but Homer is arrested and jailed. He persuades Moe to bail him out, but when Renee talks about wanting to vacation in Hawaii, spends the money on that instead. Moe is then confronted by his own conscience, in the form of Homer, who makes him feel bad for his betrayal. Moe tells Renee the truth about the insurance fraud scheme; at first she is happy he was honest, but when Moe starts scheming for a way to get Homer out of jail without paying the bail - involving graverobbing and arson - Renee is disgusted and leaves him. When he realizes she has left him, Moe sets the bar on fire by accident. Meanwhile, Homer escapes jail and goes to confront Moe, the two fight but then fall unconscious from smoke inhalation. Barney Gumble rescues them (and several kegs of beer) before the bar is completely destroyed. Homer reconciles with Moe and vows to help him get back on his feet, by temporarily relocating Moe's bar to the Simpsons' home.

== Production ==
The episode was written by Ron Hauge, who has said he thought of the episode while attempting to create a story involving general illegal activity. Originally, Hauge had a different title for the episode, "Mutual of Moemaha", parodying the name of the Mutual of Omaha insurance company. The episode was going to add to the development of Moe's character in the show, though the staff did not think they were able to develop him more until later episodes.

Director Dominic Polcino and the animators of the episode were praised for their efforts by the other staff members, especially during the scene where Homer is driving down the cliff and attempts to escape Moe's car. Polcino and his animators went to great lengths to correctly time Homer's rolling and create a vivid and detailed lake, as well as animate Homer sinking to the bottom of the lake. Show runner Mike Scully commented that, "It's hard enough for us to come up with the ideas, but when Dominic and the animators can make it, it's really fantastic."

The episode guest starred Helen Hunt as Renee, Moe's girlfriend. She recorded her lines for the episode in July 1997. In 1997, she had also worked on the film As Good as It Gets, which was directed by co-creator James L. Brooks, and released towards the end of that year. Hunt has said she liked the design of her character, who was named after Hauge's wife. During the making of the episode, Hunt and Hank Azaria, who voices Moe, were dating. In an interview with People Magazine in 1998, Scully stated: "Hank and Helen got along so well it's hard to believe they are a real couple." In July 1999, the couple married, but divorced in December 2000, after a long separation.

== Cultural references ==
The title of the episode is a reference to Billy Wilder's Double Indemnity, which also had a plot involving an insurance scam. In the scenes where Moe and Renee are seen dating, the song "I'm a Believer" by The Monkees is playing. Other songs include "One Bourbon, One Scotch, One Beer" by Amos Milburn and "Brick House" by the Commodores.

The train passing by the drive-in is a reference to the 1956 photograph Hotshot Eastbound by O. Winston Link. Hans Moleman pushing a book cart down the prison corridor references the character Brooks Hatlen doing the same in The Shawshank Redemption.

== Reception ==
In its original broadcast, "Dumbbell Indemnity" finished 25th in ratings for the week of February 23 - March 1, 1998, with a Nielsen rating of 10.5, equivalent to approximately 10.3 million viewing households. It was the third highest-rated show on the Fox network that week, following The X-Files and King of the Hill.

The authors of the book I Can't Believe It's a Bigger and Better Updated Unofficial Simpsons Guide, Warren Martyn and Adrian Wood, enjoyed the episode, commenting: "A case perhaps of life reflecting art as guest star Helen Hunt is now married to Hank Azaria, who is, of course, Moe, which is rather nice as you can't help but feel sad that, by the end of this rather clever and charming episode, Moe has been unlucky in love once more."

In a 2006 article in USA Today, "Dumbbell Indemnity" was highlighted among the six best episodes of The Simpsons season 9, along with "Trash of the Titans", "The Last Temptation of Krust", "The Cartridge Family", "The Joy of Sect", and "Das Bus".

IGN ranked Hail to the Chimp, the film Homer goes to see in the episode, as the seventh best fictional film within another work.

Show runner Mike Scully greatly enjoyed the scene where Homer attempts to escape Moe's car when it is going down the cliff, and has said that it is one of his favorite scenes from the show.

Emily L. Stephens praises the episode's noir look: "Like its namesake, 'Dumbbell Indemnity' is hinges on insurance fraud and railroad tracks, and like its namesake, it's full of artful shadows, starting with the scene where Moe outlines his plan to cash in on his rattletrap old car. ... The scene of Moe and Renee outside the tourist agency shows the subtle brilliance of The Simpsons at its best. The elaborate Hawaiian tourism display boasts alluring colors and swaying dancers, but from the back, it's just cardboard and springs, just as Moe's romancing of Renee is a bright, sunny front with a lot of subterfuge and scheming behind it.

The tragedy of 'Dumbbell Indemnity' is that Renee is no femme fatale. She was never interested in his money. Throughout the episode, she cares about simpler things: Moe's face full of character, his darling bowtie, a kiss under the full moon, his voice in her ear. ... It's Moe's own certainty that he's repulsive, and his compulsive scheming to overcome it, that makes him repulsive."
