= Lisa's Sax =

- The Simpsons episode
- Episode no.: Season 9 Episode 3
- Directed by: Dominic Polcino
- Written by: Al Jean
- Production codes: 3F26; 3G02
- Original air date: October 19, 1997

Guest appearance
- Fyvush Finkel as himself playing Krusty

Episode features
- Chalkboard gag: "I no longer want my MTV"
- Couch gag: Homer is a Russian nesting doll that twists himself off and reveals each family member's top half.
- Commentary: Al Jean; Mike Reiss; Dominic Polcino

Episode chronology
← Previous "The Principal and the Pauper"	Next → "Treehouse of Horror VIII"
- The Simpsons season 9

"Lisa's Sax" is the third episode of the ninth season of the American animated television series The Simpsons. It originally aired on Fox in the United States on October 19, 1997, to overwhelmingly positive reviews. In the series' sixth flashback episode, it is explained how Lisa got her saxophone. The episode was executive produced by Al Jean and Mike Reiss and was the first episode Jean wrote by himself, as all of his previous writing credits had been shared with Reiss. It was directed by Dominic Polcino and guest starred Fyvush Finkel, who appeared as himself portraying Krusty in a film.

== Plot ==
Homer and Bart are watching the Warner Bros. Network on television when they are interrupted by Lisa playing her saxophone in her bedroom. Bart enters Lisa's bedroom and tries to grab the saxophone from her, but he inadvertently tosses it out the window. It lands in the middle of the street and is run over by traffic and stomped on by Nelson Muntz. In a period of mourning, Lisa reveals she cannot remember ever not having that saxophone, so Homer recounts the instrument's origins.

In a flashback to 1990, Bart goes to his first day of school, but things do not go so well for him and he becomes depressed. It is during discussions of Bart's future that the school psychologist realizes the young Lisa is very intelligent, telling Homer and Marge that they need to nurture her gifted spirit. They try to send Lisa to a private school but the tuition fee costs $6,000. Meanwhile, a terrible heatwave hits Springfield and Homer saves $200 to buy an air conditioner. Marge, however, asks Homer not to buy one until they figure out how to help Lisa. At the school, Bart talks with Milhouse and makes a farting sound, which Milhouse finds amusing. Encouraged, Bart entertains a group of children and sets out on his path to become the school prankster.

On his way to purchase a new air conditioner, Homer discovers that a musical instrument is a way to encourage a gifted child, and subsequently sacrifices his air conditioner money to buy Lisa her first saxophone. In the present, Marge mentions that there is some money in the air conditioner account, so Homer decides to buy another saxophone for Lisa.

== Production ==
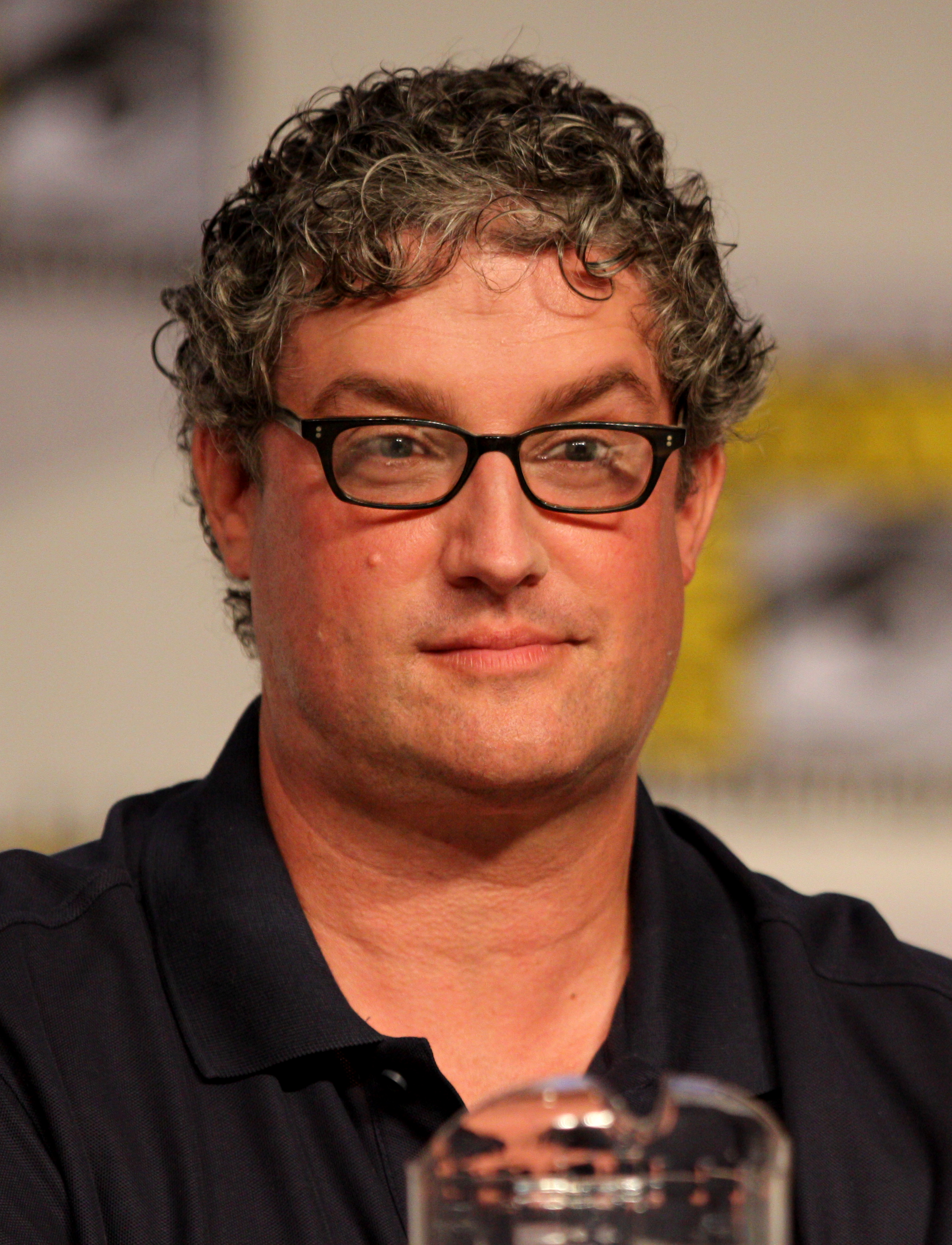
This was the first episode for which Al Jean was credited as having written by himself.

"Lisa's Sax" is the first episode of the show that Al Jean was credited as having been written by himself. Before this episode, all of his writing credits had been shared with Mike Reiss. The episode was written with a small staff that consisted of Jean, Reiss and David Stern, among others. According to Reiss, the final episode contained 80–90% of Jean's original script. It is the sixth flashback episode done by the show. "The Way We Was" was the first flashback episode and in it, Homer graduated from high school in 1974 and that made it difficult to have a realistic timeframe as this episode is set in 1990. Jean conceived the idea for the All in the Family style opening while waiting to get tickets to the O.J. Simpson murder trial. The episode was originally very short, so the montage of Lisa playing the sax at the end was added to pad it out, and the full intro is used.

The pastel drawing of Krusty was drawn entirely by Dominic Polcino, who revealed it was the only piece of original artwork created solely by him that was featured in an episode. He created the pastel drawing with this in mind. It was an easy episode for Polcino to direct due to the lack of crowds and being a "grounded episode". This is the last episode in which Doris Grau has a speaking role as Lunchlady Doris, although this episode aired nearly two years after her death. It would also mark the final time the character would speak until Season 18's "The Mook, the Chef, the Wife and Her Homer" when she was voiced by Tress MacNeille.

== Cultural references ==
The opening scene of the episode depicts a TV movie broadcast by The WB titled The Krusty the Klown Story: Booze, Drugs, Guns, Lies, Blackmail and Laughter; although this is a parody of cheesy TV movie biopics in general, it more specifically lampoons Love and Betrayal: The Mia Farrow Story which aired on Fox in 1995. While telling Bart and Lisa about 1990, Homer says, "Tracey Ullman was entertaining America with [...] crudely drawn filler material." This is a reference to The Simpsons's debut as "bumpers" airing before and after commercials on The Tracey Ullman Show. The song "Those Were the Days" parodies the opening credits of the television show All in the Family. Bart's blackboard punishment "I no longer want my MTV" is a reference to the old MTV slogan "I Want My MTV" (and a jab at the channel's declining quality due to lack of music videos and an uptick in reality TV shows, like The Real World). One of the people who run over the saxophone is a man on a tricycle, who promptly falls over. This is a reference to the show Rowan & Martin's Laugh-In. At the beginning of the flashback, the song "Don't Worry, Be Happy" by Bobby McFerrin can be heard. In the flashback, Dr. Hibbert fashioned his hair and attire like Mr. T in The A-Team. Homer can be seen watching Twin Peaks and The Giant is then shown waltzing with the White Horse. Homer imagines playing foosball with Michelangelo's David and Munch's The Scream. In King Toot's music store, when Homer buys Lisa her first saxophone, there is a guitar in the background that is similar to Eddie Van Halen's "Frankenstrat" guitar. The photo beside Kent Brockman on the news has him modeled after the Coppertone Girl. At the end of the episode, Lisa performs a brief, cruder rendition of the hook of "Baker Street" by Gerry Rafferty on her new saxophone before the music segues into the original song.

== Reception ==
In its original broadcast, "Lisa's Sax" finished 51st in ratings for the week of October 13–19, 1997, with a Nielsen rating of 8.2, equivalent to approximately 8.0 million viewing households. It was the second highest-rated show on the Fox network that week, following King of the Hill. The authors of the book I Can't Believe It's a Bigger and Better Updated Unofficial Simpsons Guide, Warren Martyn and Adrian Wood, called it "a terrific episode, full of amusing self-referential wit and it is especially nice to finally discover what it was that caused Bart to go down the path to the dark side."

Robert Canning of IGN strongly praised the episode, saying it is "not only very funny, but it's also loaded with Simpson heart." A review of The Simpsons season 9 DVD release in The San Diego Union-Tribune highlighted "Lisa's Sax" along with "All Singing, All Dancing" and "Trash of the Titans" as some of the more memorable episodes of the series.

Stephen Becker of The Dallas Morning News noted that season 9 "has a special affinity for Lisa", and highlighted this episode along with "Das Bus" and "Lisa the Simpson" in his review of the DVD. A segment of the episode where two schoolgirls chant the digits of pi while playing patty-cake is used by mathematicians Sarah J. Greenwald of Appalachian State University and Andrew Nestler of Santa Monica College in a website on the mathematics of The Simpsons.
