= King of the Hill (The Simpsons) =

- The Simpsons episode
- Episode no.: Season 9 Episode 23
- Directed by: Steven Dean Moore
- Written by: John Swartzwelder
- Production code: 5F16
- Original air date: May 3, 1998

Guest appearances
- Brendan Fraser as Brad; Steven Weber as Neil

Episode features
- Couch gag: The Simpsons sit on the couch as normal and the camera zooms out to reveal that they are inside a snow globe. Two hands then shake the globe.
- Commentary: Mike Scully; Richard Appel; Steven Dean Moore

Episode chronology
← Previous "Trash of the Titans"	Next → "Lost Our Lisa"
- The Simpsons season 9

"King of the Hill" is the twenty-third episode of the ninth season of the American animated television series The Simpsons. It originally aired on Fox in the United States on May 3, 1998. It was written by John Swartzwelder and directed by Steven Dean Moore, and guest stars Brendan Fraser and Steven Weber. The episode sees Homer trying to climb a large mountain to impress Bart after he humiliates him at a church picnic with his lack of fitness.

== Plot ==
After his obesity embarrasses Bart at a church picnic, Homer attempts to lose weight by going on midnight jogs around town. He soon discovers "Power Sauce", an energy bar made with apples which he starts to eat regularly.

At a gym, Homer meets Rainier Wolfcastle, who becomes his fitness coach. In two months, Homer is healthier and more muscular, and reveals his new exercise habits to his family. At the gym, two Power Sauce representatives, Brad and Neil, ask Wolfcastle to climb to the top of Springfield's tallest mountain, "The Murderhorn", as a publicity stunt. When Wolfcastle refuses, saying that climbing the mountain is suicide, Bart insists Homer volunteer to do it.

Grampa begs Homer not to climb the mountain, telling of a failed attempt he and his friend, C. W. McAllister, made in 1928 as a corporate publicity stunt. McAllister betrayed Grampa, stole their supplies, and continued the climb alone. Ignoring the warning, Homer accepts the challenge and is aided by two Sherpas, whom he fires after waking up one night to find them secretly dragging him up. Homer radios his decision to Brad and Neil, who fail to convince him to abandon the climb, even informing him that Power Sauce bars are actually junk food.

The mountain proves too treacherous and high for Homer, who takes shelter in a cave. There, he finds McAllister's frozen body and evidence proving it was Grampa who betrayed him. Too tired and ashamed to continue, Homer plants a flag with the family name on the plateau he has reached. An ensuing crack collapses the rest of the mountain, leaving that plateau as the new peak. Homer uses McAllister's body to sled down the mountainside, where he is greeted as a hero by the crowd. He is gratified at Bart's newfound respect for him, but annoyed to learn that his flag has come off its pole and that he has left his wallet on the peak.

== Production ==
The episode was pitched and written by John Swartzwelder. The writing staff had to find a new angle for Homer's weight problems, as the idea had been used several times before. This was emphasized in this episode when Marge does not seem to care that Homer is going to try to lose weight again.

In the scenes where the Sherpas were speaking, the show staff went to great lengths to find translations. Originally, the producers of the film adaption of the book Into Thin Air contacted to help. The film producers were shocked at the trouble the Simpsons staff were going to, and replied that they had simply made up translations in the film. The staff then had to consult various experts by telephone.

The idea of the upper part of the mountain collapsing so Homer would be at the peak came from Mike Scully's brother Brian, after the staff "desperately needed a way out".

== Reception ==
In its original broadcast, "King of the Hill" finished 23rd in ratings for the week of April 27–May 4, 1998, with a Nielsen rating of 9.4, equivalent to approximately 9.2 million viewing households. It was the fourth highest-rated show on the Fox network that week, following The X-Files, King of the Hill, and Ally McBeal.

The authors of the book I Can't Believe It's a Bigger and Better Updated Unofficial Simpsons Guide, Gary Russell and Gareth Roberts, thought well of the episode, stating: "A quite charming little adventure in which, in an effort to impress Bart, Homer undertakes a dangerous adventure and comes through successfully. It's nice because just for once, to all intents and purposes, Homer actually succeeds in something."

Les Chappell notes the episode's self-referential humor: "Marge asks if anyone's pointed out that Homer's totally unfit to climb a mountain, and the Powersauce rep honestly says 'Well, yes, a number of people' before moving right along." He praises the emotional resonance: "Homer admits to Bart before climbing that he's only doing this for his son (a move that Bart's fully on board with), and even though the Simpson flag is blown off, the two get to have a legitimate moment. Well, at least until Marge takes a look up and asks 'Is that your wallet?' It undercuts the heartfelt part of it but not so much that it turns into a downer, the right note to close this perfectly balanced episode."
