= This Little Wiggy =

- The Simpsons episode
- Episode no.: Season 9 Episode 18
- Directed by: Neil Affleck
- Written by: Dan Greaney
- Production code: 5F13
- Original air date: March 22, 1998

Guest appearance
- Phil Hartman as Troy McClure

Episode features
- Chalkboard gag: "I was not told to do this"
- Couch gag: Bart peeks from around the TV to make sure the coast is clear, and then spray paints a picture of the family on the wall and signs it with his alias, "El Barto".
- Commentary: Matt Groening; Mike Scully; George Meyer; Dan Greaney

Episode chronology
← Previous "Lisa the Simpson"	Next → "Simpson Tide"
- The Simpsons season 9

"This Little Wiggy" is the eighteenth episode of the ninth season of the American animated television series The Simpsons. It originally aired on Fox in the United States on March 22, 1998. It was written by Dan Greaney and directed by Neil Affleck. The episode sees Ralph Wiggum becoming friends with Bart. Phil Hartman guest stars as recurring character Troy McClure.

== Plot ==
At a science museum the family is visiting, Bart runs into Ralph Wiggum, who is in the process of being pushed into a giant ear by Kearney, Jimbo, Nelson, and Dolph. When Ralph is freed by a museum employee, Marge and Chief Wiggum are there to meet him. Marge observes that Ralph has a vivid imagination and learns that he has no friends to play with; she arranges a play-date for Ralph to spend time with a horrified Bart, who fears that being seen with Ralph will damage his reputation.

During their play-date, Bart and Ralph walk into Ralph's father's closet, consisting of various police utilities and records before Wiggum, initially forbidding them to enter the closet, allows them to play with the items. Bart then sees Wiggum toss aside a police master key capable of opening any door in Springfield. Bart and Ralph thus steal the key and decide to enter several closed stores at night. After encountering Nelson and his gang, the boys go to a condemned penitentiary. When Ralph objects because he is afraid, the bullies leave, but not before tossing the key into the penitentiary. Ralph and Bart enter the prison to retrieve the key, and in the process stumble onto a room housing an old electric chair. After using the master key to reactivate and test out the chair, the two flee when an elderly guard approaches.

At the Simpsons' home, Bart and Ralph discover that the penitentiary will once again be used by the town, and remember that they forgot to disable the power. Unaware that the power is now active, Mayor Quimby straps himself into the electric chair in a publicity attempt. After failing to call the penitentiary due to the elderly guard being on the phone with his wife, Ralph then tells Bart that Lisa can probably figure out a way to warn the Mayor. She decides to launch a model rocket with a warning message attached and aims it toward the penitentiary. However, the rocket is blown off-course and crashes through Mr. Burns' office window. Mr. Burns reads the message and disables the penitentiary's power after realizing it has been getting free electricity for years, barely saving Quimby. In the aftermath, the Simpsons praise Ralph, and Lisa graciously lets him get the kudos for her achievement. As Ralph smiles, a leprechaun visible only to him tells him he did well, and then tells him it's time for him to burn down the Simpsons' house. Ralph keeps smiling and nods.

== Production ==
Show runner Mike Scully had pitched an idea to Dan Greaney on Marge forcing Bart to become Ralph Wiggum's friend. Scully gave the idea to Greaney due to his ability to write Ralph's lines and actions well, and his overall liking of the character. This episode was the second to focus on Ralph, after the fourth-season episode "I Love Lisa". Despite this, in 2007, producer J. Stewart Burns did not believe Ralph had an episode with a plot centered on him.

The robot that was introduced early in the episode was influenced by Greaney's experiences working with a USA Today themed robot. While at a baseball game with the robot, the robot led the stadium in singing "Take Me Out to the Ball Game". The robot was not well-received, and the spectators threw objects at it. The robot's operator had to stay close to the robot during the baseball game, and was also teased and bothered in the same way as the operator in the episode. Episode director Neil Affleck was praised by the staff for his directing in this episode. In the scene where Chief Wiggum falls on his back in his bedroom, unable to roll over or get back up, Affleck decided to act out the scene for the staff to showcase how Affleck envisioned Chief Wiggum's predicament. Affleck was also praised for his ability to create three new elaborate settings in the episode: the science museum, the Springfield penitentiary, and the large toy store.

The episode originally did not involve Lisa helping Ralph and Bart to brainstorm an idea to alert the penitentiary. The original scene, which Greaney cites as one of his favorite scenes in the show, despite never actually being in the show, involved Bart, Ralph, and Homer trying to make a plan to save Mayor Quimby. This was also the final episode to air that featured a character voiced by Phil Hartman, while Hartman was still alive.

== Reception ==
In its original broadcast, "This Little Wiggy" finished 27th in ratings for the week of March 16–22, 1998, with a Nielsen rating of 9.1, equivalent to approximately 8.9 million viewing households. It was the second highest-rated show on the Fox network that week, following Ally McBeal.

The authors of the book I Can't Believe It's a Bigger and Better Updated Unofficial Simpsons Guide, Gary Russell and Gareth Roberts, enjoyed the episode, remarking: "Marvellous fun as Bart comes to realize there's more to Ralph, or at least his daddy, than he realised."

Les Chappell writes that "Interestingly, what makes 'This Little Wiggy' work so well is that despite being introduced as a Ralph episode, this is a story that's largely about Bart. Bart's pretty terrible to Ralph in the early goings, but that reluctance is driven less by his finding Ralph off-putting than it is his fears about what hanging out with him will do to his popularity. ... [T]he other part of Bart's longstanding quest for popularity is that can't bring himself to be truly malicious, and he winds up in the same muddy puddle as Ralph. (Nelson's 'I hope the irony is not lost on you, Simpson' is a great line and another excellent delivery from Cartwright.)"
