= Bart Carny =

- The Simpsons episode
- Episode no.: Season 9 Episode 12
- Directed by: Mark Kirkland
- Written by: John Swartzwelder
- Production code: 5F08
- Original air date: January 11, 1998

Guest appearance
- Jim Varney as Cooder

Episode features
- Couch gag: As the family goes to sit down, the couch gets pulled back. Nelson appears from behind the couch, saying "Ha-Ha".
- Commentary: Matt Groening; Mike Scully; George Meyer; Mark Kirkland

Episode chronology
← Previous "All Singing, All Dancing"	Next → "The Joy of Sect"
- The Simpsons season 9

"Bart Carny" is the twelfth episode of the ninth season of the American animated television series, The Simpsons. It originally aired on Fox in the United States on January 11, 1998. Homer and Bart start working at a carnival and befriend a father and son duo named Cooder and Spud. It was written by John Swartzwelder, directed by Mark Kirkland and guest stars Jim Varney as Cooder the carny. The episode contains several cultural references and received a generally mixed critical reception.

== Plot ==
When Marge unsuccessfully tries to get the kids to clean up the backyard, Homer runs into the house to exclaim to the family that the carnival is in town. After trying some rides, Bart gets himself into trouble by crashing a display of Hitler's limousine into a tree. To repay the loss, Bart and Homer become carnies.

They meet up with carnies Cooder and his son, Spud. Cooder asks Homer to run his fixed ring toss game, but Homer fails to bribe Chief Wiggum (despite numerous hints), and Cooder's game is shut down. Feeling guilty, Homer invites Cooder and Spud to stay at the Simpson residence, much to Marge's dismay.

To express their gratitude, the Cooders give the Simpsons tickets on a glass-bottom boat ride. When the Simpsons return, they find that the locks have been changed, the windows are all boarded up, and the Simpsons' name is crossed off the mailbox and replaced by "The Cooders". The family is forced to take up residence in Bart's treehouse. After the Simpsons go to the police in order to evict the Cooders from their house, Chief Wiggum refuses to act, still aggrieved over not receiving a bribe.

Homer proposes to Cooder, that if he can throw a hula hoop onto the chimney, they get their house back. If he misses, he will sign the deed over to Cooder. Cooder agrees and steps onto the lawn to watch Homer's attempt. Homer stretches and warms up, as if about to throw, but instead, he and his family suddenly rush into the house, leaving Cooder and Spud dumbfounded, but also impressed that they were "beaten by the best". After Homer initially gloats at them from inside, he begins to feel sorry for them again, and considers bringing them back in. At the urging of a nervous Bart, Marge then distracts Homer by pointing out a special "ass groove" that he sits on the couch in, and the episode ends with his attempt to try and fix it after they had ruined it by sitting on it themselves.

== Production ==
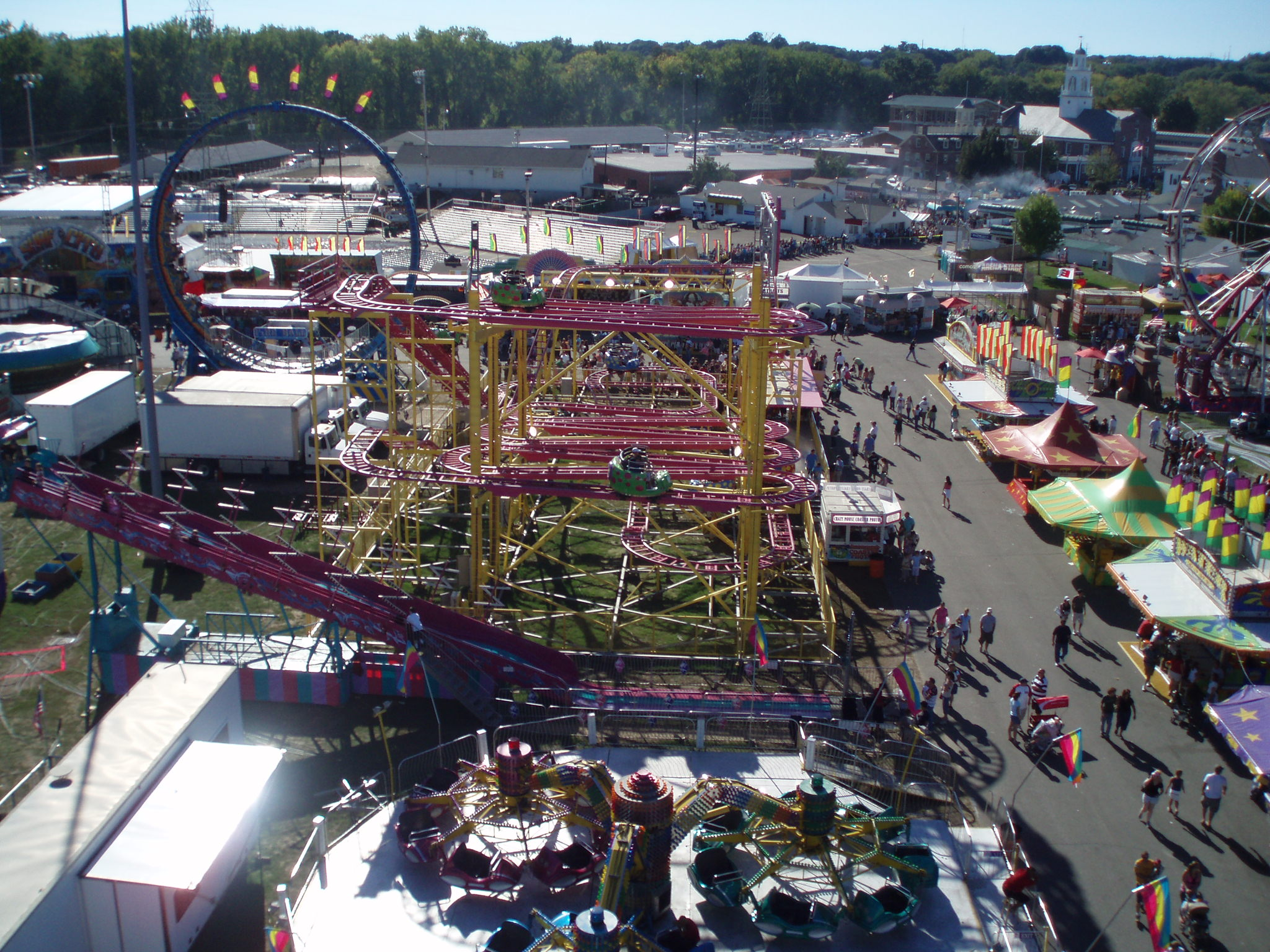
The Big E Fair was the inspiration for this episode.

The carnival in this episode is based on The Eastern States Exposition (currently known as The Big E) fair. As a child, Mike Scully went to the fair, and had hoped one day to be a carny. This is the only episode that Mark Kirkland told his parents not to watch. This is due to Bart's line "Out of my way, I'm Hitler". Kirkland's stepfather was a lieutenant in World War II and was injured while in combat. Cooder was modeled after David Mirkin, the showrunner of seasons five and six and co-writer and the executive producer of two episodes in the ninth season. Spud's head shape is modeled after Bart's head. The "fisheye effect", when Cooder is looking through the peep hole, was drawn by hand, not optically, by assistant director Matthew Nastuk. Matt Groening said they had several endings worked out, including one where Homer made the hula hoop over the chimney.

== Cultural references ==
The episode's title is a reference to the American actor and comedian Art Carney. When Homer and Bart talk through their teeth while holding the chickens, it is a reference to Bob Hope and Bing Crosby films. Some of the prizes for the ring toss game are a Def Leppard mirror, a Rubik's Cube, and a Magic 8 Ball. The song being played at the end when Homer fixes his "ass groove" is "Groove Me" by King Floyd.

The episode makes references to two past Simpsons episodes. Marge advises Homer not ride the Tooth Chipper roller coaster because of his quadruple bypass. During the family's glass-bottom boat ride, a barrel of Li'l Lisa's Patented Animal Slurry is visible on the sea floor.

== Reception ==
In its original broadcast, "Bart Carny" finished 13th in ratings for the week of January 5–11, 1998, with a Nielsen rating of 11.9, equivalent to approximately 11.7 million viewing households, making it the highest rated episode of Season 9. It was tied with King of the Hill as the second highest-rated show on the Fox network that week, following The X-Files.

The authors of the book I Can't Believe It's a Bigger and Better Updated Unofficial Simpsons Guide, Gary Russell and Gareth Roberts, called it "one of the most dismally unfunny episodes ever, lifted only by the brief appearance of a talking camel and Homer's clever way of getting Cooder and Spud out of his home. Whereas most of the series' politically incorrect moments are funny and well-observed, this episode seems to be saying that fairground folk and travelers really are deeply unpleasant criminals who are both irredeemable and unworthy of help. Nasty-taste-in-the-mouth time."

Isaac Mitchell-Frey of the Herald Sun described the episode as "brilliant", and highlighted it along with episodes "The Trouble with Trillions" and "The Joy of Sect" and it has been described by the other Simpsons writers in the DVD audio commentary as "criminally underrated".
