= The Two Mrs. Nahasapeemapetilons =

- The Simpsons episode
- Episode no.: Season 9 Episode 7
- Directed by: Steven Dean Moore
- Written by: Richard Appel
- Production code: 5F04
- Original air date: November 16, 1997

Guest appearances
- Andrea Martin as Apu's mother; Jan Hooks as Manjula

Episode features
- Couch gag: Bart spray paints a picture of the family on the wall and signs it with his alias, "El Barto".
- Commentary: Mike Scully; Richard Appel; Steven Dean Moore

Episode chronology
← Previous "Bart Star"	Next → "Lisa the Skeptic"
- The Simpsons season 9

"The Two Mrs. Nahasapeemapetilons" is the seventh episode of the ninth season of the American animated television series The Simpsons. It originally aired on Fox in the United States on November 16, 1997. It was written by Richard Appel and directed by Steven Dean Moore. The episode sees Apu Nahasapeemapetilon marry Manjula, and incorporates several aspects of Hindu wedding ceremonies, which the writers researched during the episode's production. Appel pitched the episode several years before season nine but the idea was not used until Mike Scully became showrunner. The episode's subplot, which sees Homer stay at the Springfield Retirement Castle, was initially conceived as a separate episode, but could not be developed in enough detail. The episode received positive reviews.

== Plot ==
At a bachelor auction, the available bachelors on display are deemed undesirable, and the auction generates no money at all. Marge then nominates Apu, who is deemed a success by the women at the auction. He goes out on dates with many of the town's women, and begins to enjoy his bachelor lifestyle. However, he receives a letter from his mother in India, reminding him of his arranged marriage to Manjula, the daughter of a family friend. Not wanting to get married, Apu asks Homer for advice, who suggests Apu tell his mother that he is already married. Days later, Apu thinks that he has escaped the marriage until he sees his mother walking towards the Kwik-E-Mart. To cover him, Homer tells Apu to pretend that Marge is his wife.

At the Simpson residence, Marge disapproves of the plan, but decides to do it for Apu's sake. While the plan is underway Homer decides to stay in the Springfield Retirement Castle with his father, posing as resident Cornelius Talmadge. Homer enjoys his stay at the home immensely, until the real Cornelius returns, at which point he flees. He returns home and gets into bed with Marge. Mrs. Nahasapeemapetilon enters to say goodbye, but is shocked to see Marge in bed with another man, and Apu on the floor. Tired of the whole charade, Marge forces Apu to tell his mother the truth, who declares that the arranged marriage will proceed as planned.

The wedding is held in the Simpsons' backyard, but Apu still has second thoughts about it. However, when he sees Manjula for the first time in years, he is shocked by her beauty and wit, and feels less reluctant. The pair then decide that perhaps the marriage can work after all. Homer, poorly disguised as Ganesha, tries to stop the wedding but is chased off by one of Apu's relatives.

== Production ==
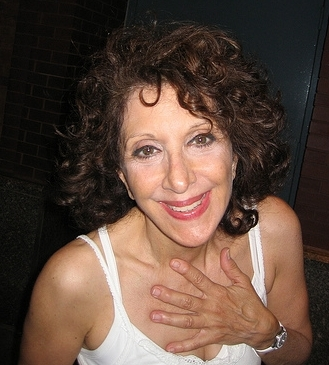
Andrea Martin voiced Apu's mother.

Writer Richard Appel pitched "The Two Mrs. Nahasapeemapetilons" at a story retreat several years before the ninth season, but it could not be fitted into a season at that point. Mike Scully liked the idea and so decided to use it in his first season as showrunner. Homer's subplot at the retirement home was an idea that Scully had had for a long time. The plot could not be sustained for a whole episode, so it was fitted into this one.

The bachelor auction was created solely to provide more evidence that Apu was the best bachelor in Springfield. Appel found that the scene "wrote itself", as every other man in Springfield is essentially a loser compared to Apu. The scene acted as the episode's opening set piece, a concept that Scully liked to use in every episode. The montage of Apu getting several different hair styles originally included three more, but they ended up being cut for time. The shot in which Apu's mother falls to the ground, a joke that the staff love, was inspired by an incident when Moore saw a man fall in much the same way. The joke was only inserted to buy Apu and Homer more time to come up with a lie. Homer writing "Where are the sticky buns" on a sheet of paper after Apu asks him for advice is one of Mike Scully's favorite jokes. Before the wedding, Bart fuels a "sacred fire" with pages from a hymn book. Originally, he used pages from the Bible, but after the scene had been animated, Scully found the joke "horrible" and changed the book title to "Hymns".

Andrea Martin provided the voice of Apu's mother, recording her part in New York City. She wanted to get the voice perfect, so in between takes she listened to tapes of Hank Azaria reading lines for Apu, to make sure her voice could realistically be Apu's mother's. During the flashback to Apu's childhood, the animators made sure not to show Manjula, as they wished to reveal her at the end of the episode.

The staff researched arranged Hindu marriages, learning about ideas such as the lotus flower being used as a message, but a majority of the information turned out "not to be as hilarious [as the writers] had hoped", and so was dropped. Steven Dean Moore, the episode's director, researched the design of every aspect of Indian culture shown in the episode. The events of the wedding, as well as many of the items present, were all taken from traditional Hindu marriage ceremonies.

== Cultural references ==
During Apu's bachelor binge, he gets a haircut at the barbershop Hairy Shearers, a reference to cast member Harry Shearer. The scene where Moe walks on and off the stage without breaking his stride was loosely based on a moment that occurred during a stand-up show of comedian Redd Foxx. During a show in Las Vegas, Foxx came on stage to the Sanford and Son theme song, only to find that there were only a few people in the audience. Foxx reacted angrily, and refused to do a show for such a small audience. He then walked off stage. The house orchestra, puzzled by Foxx leaving, simply played him off with the Sanford and Son theme song again. This incident was also referenced in the later episode "Trash of the Titans", when Ray Patterson is reinstated, although the reference here is more similar to the real event. Bart wishes he had an elephant; Lisa reminds him that he did.

The instrumental accompanying Barney in the bachelor raffle is "My Guy" by Mary Wells. The Foreigner song "Hot Blooded" plays over Apu's bachelor binge, and he dances in a manner similar to Riverdance. An Indian version of The Carpenters' song "(They Long to Be) Close to You" is sung at the wedding; an Indian vocal group was hired to sing, while Alf Clausen wrote the instrumental.

== Reception ==
In its original broadcast, "The Two Mrs. Nahasapeemapetilons" finished 22nd in ratings for the week of November 10–16, 1997, with a Nielsen rating of 11.6, equivalent to approximately 11.4 million viewing households. It was the third highest-rated show on the Fox network that week, following The X-Files and King of the Hill. Todd Gilchrist of IGN named the episode one of his favorites of the ninth season in his review of the DVD boxset, while Gary Russell and Gareth Roberts, the authors of the book I Can't Believe It's a Bigger and Better Updated Unofficial Simpsons Guide, called it "a good fun episode". Les Chappell praises the development of Apu's arc: "'Homer And Apu' took him from caricature convenience store owner to a man with many hidden talents, yet who was ultimately lost without said convenience store. 'Much Apu About Nothing' explored the past that brought him to Springfield and the war between heritage and home that ensued when it tried to kick him out. And in 'The Two Mrs. Nahasapeemapetilons' he graduates from bachelor to groom, in an episode that's steeped in farce yet still manages to take his journey seriously."
