= Das Bus =

15th episode of the 9th season of The Simpsons

- The Simpsons episode
- Episode no.: Season 9 Episode 15
- Directed by: Pete Michels
- Written by: David X. Cohen
- Production code: 5F11
- Original air date: February 15, 1998

Guest appearances
- Phil Hartman as Troy McClure; James Earl Jones as the narrator; Jack Ong as the Chinese fisherman

Episode features
- Couch gag: The family is portrayed as frogs (with Maggie as a tadpole) on a lily pad.
- Commentary: Matt Groening; Mike Scully; George Meyer; David X. Cohen; Pete Michels

Episode chronology
← Previous "The Joy of Sect"	Next → "The Last Temptation of Krust"
- The Simpsons season 9

"Das Bus" is the fourteenth episode of the ninth season of the American animated television series The Simpsons. It originally aired on Fox in the United States on February 15, 1998. In an extended parody of Lord of the Flies, Bart, Lisa, and other students from Springfield Elementary School are stranded on an island and are forced to work together. Meanwhile, Homer founds his own Internet company. It was written by David X. Cohen and directed by Pete Michels. Guest star James Earl Jones narrates the final scene of the episode.

== Plot ==
The Springfield Elementary School Model United Nations club is going on a field trip. On the bus, Bart, Nelson, Ralph, and Milhouse play a game by racing fruit down the aisle, which ends with Milhouse rolling a grapefruit that gets stuck under the bus's brake pedal. When Otto tries to press down on the pedal, it squirts juice into his eyes, causing him to lose control and drive the bus off a bridge into a large body of water. While swimming for help, Otto gets swept away by the current and picked up by foreign fishermen, who plan to use him for slave labor below the deck of their ship.

The students swim to a nearby desert island, where everyone falls to accusing each other before Nelson points out that the bus accident was Milhouse's fault. Bart tries to tell everyone that being stranded is fun, and imagines a lavish island lifestyle similar to The Swiss Family Robinson, but reality sets in when the island is found to be largely barren. With no natural food, no survival skills and no adult supervision, the kids end up relying on a cooler of snack food that Bart retrieves from the sunken bus. Lisa quickly imposes a rationing system on the cooler, only for the kids to awake the next morning and find that all the food has been eaten overnight. They accuse Milhouse of eating everything, while Milhouse instead tries to blame a mysterious island "monster". As they prepare to lynch him, Lisa reminds them of why they travelled in the first place – the Model UN – and Milhouse is allowed a trial, with Bart as a judge.

Back at home, Homer discovers that Ned Flanders has his own home-based Internet business and decides he wants to start his own company. However, it turns out that Homer has no idea how to run an Internet business, does not provide any goods or services, and does not even own a computer. He is later visited by Bill Gates and his goons, who offer to buy out Homer's company but instead destroy his office.

With Milhouse on trial, Nelson has no case for the prosecution other than trying to coerce a confession out of him, and the trial ends with Bart begrudgingly acquitting Milhouse due to insufficient evidence. However, the other kids refuse to accept Bart's verdict, and the situation descends into outright mob rule as Milhouse, Bart and Lisa are chased into a cave. There, the children are spooked by the island's "monster", which turns out to be a wild boar. On one of the boar's tusks is an empty bag of chips, revealing that it had eaten the snacks. Lisa realizes that there must be a nearby food source to sustain the boar and sees it licking slime from a nearby rock. Lisa, a vegetarian, is the only one who takes to eating the slime, while the other kids kill and eat the boar instead. A narration by James Earl Jones recounts that the kids learned to live in peace and were rescued soon after by "oh, let's say, Moe".

== Production ==
According to the DVD commentary for The Simpsons' ninth season, the couch gag was suggested by Dan Castellaneta's niece. To make the fishermen's speech as accurate as possible, Cohen called a friend who spoke Mandarin. When the Chinese actors came, the actors did not feel Mandarin was geographically appropriate, and it was changed to Cantonese, which is spoken more in China's coastal regions and would be more appropriate for sailors and fishermen. In a deleted scene, Homer furnishes his home office with anti-stress toys, but becomes angry and stressful himself when he tries each of them due to their failure to work or their immediate breakage due to shoddy manufacturing. The producers said the decision to cut that scene was for timing purposes.

== Cultural references ==
Most of the episode's plot, namely a group of children trapped on an island and the breakdown of law, order and civility, is a reference to William Golding's Lord of the Flies (1954), including the use of deus ex machina as a plot device that saves the children. A main diversion was while the episode showed the kids learning to live in peace, the novel had the boys' "war" broken up when they are rescued by a Navy ship, which, ironically, was in the middle of a war itself. The title is a play on Das Boot (1981), although it would be "Der Bus" in German.

When the children are squabbling in the classroom, Principal Skinner restores order by banging his shoe on the desk. Skinner's actions are a reference to the shoe-banging incident by Soviet leader Nikita Khrushchev at the UN in 1960. The bus plunge off the overpass was inspired by the climax of True Lies (1994), although some animators remarked a similar scene happened in the James Bond film Licence to Kill (1989), where a corrupt cop helps to free the Bond villain from custody.

When the kids are on a manhunt of Lisa, Bart and Milhouse, they use charcoal ash on their faces like war paint, and Ralph Wiggum paints his in a cat style akin to Peter Criss of Kiss. When escaping from the other children, Bart, Lisa and Milhouse have to swing across a gap on a vine; Milhouse goes across first, but refuses to throw the vine back (calling out that "there's no time") in a reference to the opening scene of Raiders of the Lost Ark (1981), where Satipo does the same to Indiana Jones (but as an act of betrayal).

== Reception ==
In its original broadcast, "Das Bus" finished 17th in ratings for the week of February 9–15, 1998, with a Nielsen rating of 9.9, equivalent to approximately 9.6 million viewing households. It was the third highest-rated show on the Fox network that week, following The X-Files and King of the Hill. In a 2006 article in USA Today, "Das Bus" was highlighted among the six best episodes of The Simpsons season 9, along with "Trash of the Titans", "The Last Temptation of Krust", "The Cartridge Family", "Dumbbell Indemnity" and "The Joy of Sect".

The authors of the book I Can't Believe It's a Bigger and Better Updated Unofficial Simpsons Guide, Warren Martyn and Adrian Wood, called it a "fantastic episode", adding: "Ignore the Internet business side, and wallow in the cleverness of the children trapped on the island. Bart has never been cleverer, Nelson more menacing, and Milhouse more geekish. Great stuff with a delightful ending that is so witty and obvious, that it's annoying you never imagined they'd get away with it."

Rowan Kaiser writes that "The kids of Springfield Elementary have long been one of The Simpsons' most fertile subgenres" and that "Das Bus" "may be one of the best examples." He asks: "what is it about Springfield's children that works so well? There are a few reasons that The Simpsons' humor works brilliantly with its children. First of all, the show is built on bullshit—both in terms of producing it and calling it out. As 'Das Bus' begins at Springfield Elementary, the bullshit is thick and luxurious. In large part this is because, in the world of The Simpsons, one of the defining features of childhood is bullshit, and learning to see through it, or deploy it, is a pure sign of growing up ... Then in the end, The Simpsons makes certain the viewers are complicit as well. Out of nowhere, they go out and grab the most authoritative voice actor of all time, Darth Vader and CNN's James Earl Jones. And they have him bullshit the show out of having to even bother with an ending as anyone with an idea of storytelling or television episode construction would require. 'So the children learned to function as a society. And eventually they were rescued by, oh, let's say, Moe.' And we'll put up with it, because it's earned that authority, and because in the end, we're all no different than the children of Springfield Elementary."

The episode has become study material for sociology courses at University of California, Berkeley, where it is used to "examine issues of the production and reception of cultural objects, in this case, a satirical cartoon show", and to figure out what it is "trying to tell audiences about aspects primarily of American society, and, to a lesser extent, about other societies". Some questions asked in the courses include: "What aspects of American society are being addressed in the episode? What aspects of them are used to make the points? How is the satire conveyed: through language? Drawing? Music? Is the behavior of each character consistent with his/her character as developed over the years? Can we identify elements of the historical/political context that the writers are satirizing? What is the difference between satire and parody?"
