= Miracle on Evergreen Terrace =

- The Simpsons episode
- Episode no.: Season 9 Episode 10
- Directed by: Bob Anderson
- Written by: Ron Hauge
- Production code: 5F07
- Original air date: December 21, 1997

Guest appearance
- Alex Trebek as himself

Episode features
- Chalkboard gag: "Rudolph's red nose is not alcohol-related"
- Couch gag: (first) Somebody shakes up a snow globe, which contains the Simpsons sitting on a couch. / (second) The Simpsons run to the living room, only to notice that everything has been stolen, which includes their couch.
- Commentary: Matt Groening; Mike Scully; George Meyer; Ron Hauge; Nancy Cartwright; Yeardley Smith; Bob Anderson

Episode chronology
← Previous "Realty Bites"	Next → "All Singing, All Dancing"
- The Simpsons season 9

"Miracle on Evergreen Terrace" is the tenth episode of the ninth season of the American animated television series The Simpsons. It originally aired on Fox in the United States on December 21, 1997 and centers on Bart, who inadvertently ruins Christmas for him and the other Simpsons following an incident caused by an attempt to open his presents early.

It was written by Ron Hauge, directed by Bob Anderson and guest stars Alex Trebek as himself. Hauge was inspired to write the episode after learning of an orphanage that had been ripped off. The episode was included, among other Christmas themed episodes of the series, on a 2005 Christmas special boxed set on DVD.

== Plot ==
Homer and Marge go Christmas shopping at a Try-N-Save megastore, where frenzied shoppers are snatching the holiday season's most popular toys. Homer, posing as a cashier, helps himself to whatever items he finds suitable for the family. He then stuffs the register with money and leaves satisfied.

At bedtime on Christmas Eve, the family makes last-minute preparations at home, as Marge tells everyone that no one can get up to open their presents until seven o'clock in the morning, but Bart drinks many glasses of water to wake up early and open his, one of which is a remote-controlled fire truck. He plays with it until it sprays water on an overloaded electrical socket, inciting a fire that engulfs and melts the plastic Christmas tree and the remaining presents beneath it. Bart then hides the evidence beneath the snow in the front yard.

Soon after, Bart attempts to get back inside and cover up the incident, but is unsuccessful when the family is now downstairs to find the tree and presents missing; he then lies about how he caught a burglar making off with it all. The police investigate and Kent Brockman does an interview on the case.

As a result of the report, everyone in Springfield gives them a new Christmas tree and fifteen thousand dollars, the latter of which Homer uses to purchase a new car. Driving it home, Homer gets stuck behind The Plow King and impatiently passes it. He then drives the car onto a frozen lake, forcing everyone to jump out as the ice soon gives way, sinking and destroying the car.

The next morning, a guilt-ridden Bart reveals the truth to the other Simpsons. Though they are furious with him, they decide to go along with the lie when Brockman and his news crew arrive to do a follow-up story. When a cameraman, with help from Santa's Little Helper, finds the tree's remains, the family is forced to confess; Springfield's citizens, feeling deceived, publicly shun and send them hate mail detailing that the money used in the lost car’s purchase be returned. Since they apparently did not insure it, the family cannot get the money back to their former friends and current enraged neighbors.

Marge attempts to win back enough money to make things right on Jeopardy!, but is unsuccessful, as she finishes with negative five thousand two hundred dollars and has to flee when host Alex Trebek asks for the money back (which doesn't happen on the real life show). The Simpsons arrive home to find everyone in Springfield, including Trebek, gathered on their lawn and Marge thinks the town has forgiven them. However, while that is technically true, the price was the ransacking of everything the Simpsons had in their house, including Santa's Little Helper and Snowball II. The family finds a glimmer of hope when they playfully fight over the only thing they have left – a tattered washcloth.

== Production ==
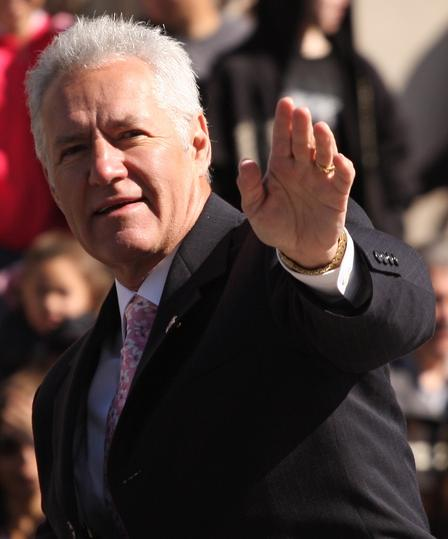
Marge appears on Jeopardy! and host Alex Trebek guest stars as himself.

Writer Ron Hauge said he got the idea for the episode one day when he was heading to work. He was listening to the radio and heard of an orphanage getting ripped off, and they were getting back more than they gave. The spectators in the stands during Bart's dreams are based on the likenesses of various animators.

Krusty saying "15,000 Missoulians" is a reference to Ron Hauge having lived in Missoula, Montana. The text "I'll Keell you" written on the Simpsons' car is a reference to a phrase written on a Wiffleball bat that the writers had in the office.

== Cultural references ==
The episode has several references to Christmas films. The title is a play on Miracle on 34th Street, while the scene where everyone rallies around to support the Simpsons is reminiscent of the final scene of It's a Wonderful Life. The latter is further spoofed when Homer tells Lisa to stop playing the piano which parodies a similar scene involving George Bailey.

A Charlie Brown Christmas is also parodied when the senior citizens are dancing at the Springfield Retirement Castle—their dancing is based on the way the Peanuts characters dance. Marge appears as a contestant on Jeopardy! with host Alex Trebek guest starring. One of the stuffed animals Chief Wiggum is carrying is Binky from Matt Groening's comic strip Life in Hell. The song that closes the episode is "Santa's On His Way" by Bob Wills & His Texas Playboys.

== Reception ==
In its original broadcast, "Miracle on Evergreen Terrace" finished 23rd in ratings for the week of December 15–21, 1997, with a Nielsen rating of 9.8, equivalent to approximately 9.6 million viewing households. It was the second highest-rated show on the Fox network that week, following King of the Hill.

The authors of the book I Can't Believe It's a Bigger and Better Updated Unofficial Simpsons Guide said "A deliberately mawkish Christmas episode that is low on good jokes (although the Simpsons watching their own fire on television is a good start) and a retread of any number of episodes where Bart does wrong, feels guilty and eventually has to fess up. The only real ray of sunshine is the closing moments when the neighbours get their revenge but the Simpsons find the family spirit after all."

In its review of a 2005 DVD boxed set of Christmas themed episodes of The Simpsons, The Journal described "Simpsons Roasting on an Open Fire", "Miracle On Evergreen Terrace", "Skinner's Sense of Snow", and "Dude, Where's My Ranch?" among memorable episodes of the series.

In his review of the same DVD, Digitally Obsessed critic Joel Cunningham wrote that "Miracle on Evergreen Terrace" is "a good one [...] A nice combo of humor, satire, and heartwarming holiday fuzzies". Andy Dougan wrote in Evening Times that the episode is "one of the darkest, blackest Christmas cartoons ever animated". Kyle Ryan writes of the ending: "It seems like a cynical way to close out an episode, the kind of thing that the show’s critics would have seized on back in 1990. But the final shot, of the family having fun as they chase each other around the house in pursuit of that last washcloth, reiterates Marge’s point without coming out and saying it. When you have nothing else, you always have family—and that’s basically been the point of The Simpsons for 26 years now."
