= Pete Michels =

American animation director

- Born: December 15, 1964; Little Ferry, New Jersey, U.S.
- Occupation: Animation director
- Years active: 1990–present

Peter John Michels (born December 15, 1964) is an American animation director who is the supervising director for the animated series Krapopolis (2023–present) on Fox. Prior, he was a supervising director on seasons 1 and 2 of Rick and Morty, an animation and supervising director on Family Guy, and supervising director of the short-lived TV show Kid Notorious. He started working on The Simpsons in 1990 as a background layout and character layout artist, and eventually became a director with a dozen "Simpsons" episodes to his name. He has also been a director on Rugrats, Skylander Academy, and Disney's FutureWorm.

Michels grew up in Little Ferry, New Jersey. He attended Ridgefield Park High School and graduated as part of the class of 1983. He graduated from Jersey City State College, where a course in animation sparked further interest which brought him to the University of California, Los Angeles, where he earned his MFA in Animation.

== The Simpsons episodes ==
He has directed the following The Simpsons episodes:

- "Brother from Another Series"
- "The Cartridge Family"
- "Das Bus"
- "Lost Our Lisa"
- "When You Dish Upon a Star"
- "Homer to the Max"
- "They Saved Lisa's Brain"
- "Treehouse of Horror X"
- "Poppa's Got a Brand New Badge"
- "Strong Arms of the Ma"
- "Brake My Wife, Please"

== Family Guy episodes ==
He has directed the following Family Guy episodes:

- "The Kiss Seen Around the World"
- "Screwed the Pooch"
- "Family Guy Viewer Mail#1"
- "Fast Times at Buddy Cianci Jr. High"
- "Stewie Griffin: The Untold Story"
- "Chick Cancer"
- "No Chris Left Behind"
- "Padre de Familia"
- "The Former Life of Brian"
- "FOX-y Lady"
- "Brian's Got a Brand New Bag"
- "Business Guy"
- "Quagmire's Dad"
- "New Kidney in Town"
- "Foreign Affairs"
- "Livin' on a Prayer"
- "Tea Peter"
- "Space Cadet"
- "12 and a Half Angry Men"
- "Quagmire's Quagmire"

== Bless the Harts episodes ==
- "Hug N' Bugs"
- "Pig Trouble in Little Greenpoint"
- "Miracle on Culpepper Slims Boulevard"
- "My Best Frenda"
