= Ned Goldreyer =

American television writer

Ned Goldreyer is an American television writer and producer who lives in Los Angeles.

== Career ==
He began his career as a freelance writer for Politically Incorrect and went on to join the staffs of Late Night with Conan O'Brien, The Simpsons, Dilbert, Grounded for Life, Twins, Lewis Black's Root of All Evil, Jonas, and Totally Biased with W. Kamau Bell.

== Filmography ==
Writer:

- Late Night with Conan O'Brien (9 episodes, 1994–1996)
- The Simpsons (2 episodes, 1997–1998, also story editor from 1996-1998)
  - "Lisa the Simpson" (1998)
  - "Treehouse of Horror VIII" -- "Easy Bake Coven" (1997)
- House Rules (1998)
- Dilbert (9 episodes, 1999–2000)
- 2000 MTV Movie Awards (2000)
- Grounded for Life (13 episodes, 2001–2005)
- Twins (2005)
- 2007 MTV Movie Awards (2007)
- Spike Guys Choice (2008)
- Lewis Black's Root of All Evil (10 episodes, 2008)
- Back at the Barnyard (1 episode, 2009)
- Jonas (1 and 1/2 episodes, 2010)
- Totally Biased with W. Kamau Bell (2012-2013)
- Hollywood Puppet Show (10 episodes, 2018)

Producer:

- House Rules (1998)
- Dilbert (9 episodes, 1999–2000)
- Grounded for Life (91 episodes, 2001–2005)
- Twins (2005)
- Jonas (2010)

== Awards and nominations ==
- 1996, nominated for an Emmy Award for 'Outstanding Individual Achievement in Writing for a Variety or Music Program' for Late Night with Conan O'Brien
- 1997, won a WGA Award for 'Comedy/Variety (Including Talk) - Series' for Late Night with Conan O'Brien
