= Realty Bites =

- The Simpsons episode
- Episode no.: Season 9 Episode 9
- Directed by: Swinton O. Scott III
- Written by: Dan Greaney
- Production code: 5F06
- Original air date: December 7, 1997

Guest appearance
- Phil Hartman as Lionel Hutz

Episode features
- Chalkboard gag: "There was no Roman god named 'Fartacus'".
- Couch gag: Matt Groening's live-action hand spins the family around like spin art.
- Commentary: Mike Scully; Dan Greaney; Richard Appel; Swinton O. Scott III

Episode chronology
| ← Previous "Lisa the Skeptic" | Next → "Miracle on Evergreen Terrace" |
- The Simpsons season 9

"Realty Bites" is the ninth episode of the ninth season of the American animated television series The Simpsons. It originally aired on Fox in the United States on December 7, 1997. The episode sees Marge becoming a real estate agent, while Homer enjoys Snake's car. It was written by Dan Greaney and directed by Swinton O. Scott III.

This episode features the final speaking appearance of Lionel Hutz, five months before the death of Phil Hartman. It also features the first appearance of prolific recurring characters Gil Gunderson and Cookie Kwan, both of whom have appeared in over 100 subsequent episodes. The episode's development grew out of a desire by the writers to do a show focused on Marge, where her job did not work out.

The episode is featured in a special 2003 DVD compilation called The Simpsons: Risky Business, along with "Marge Gets a Job", "Deep Space Homer", and "Homer the Smithers".

== Plot ==
After Marge complains about the family spending their weekends idly at home, Homer drags her to a police seized-property auction. While there, he buys Snake's car, Li'l Bandit. Upon seeing this, Snake vows to kill Homer. After the auction, insisting on walking home rather than ride in Homer's new dangerous hotrod, Marge encounters Lionel Hutz, who has become a realtor. Marge decides to try the job for herself and begins to work for Hutz at Red Blazer Realty. She tells prospective buyers her honest opinion about the houses she shows them, which prevents her from selling any homes. Hutz instructs Marge to use more positive descriptions when selling the houses, and also informs her if she does not sell a house in the first week, she will be fired. Marge tries to bend the truth but fails as she just cannot lie to others. Marge does not disclose the entire truth of the house she sells to Ned Flanders and his family, which had been the site of a multiple homicide, a property which Red Blazer Realty had been unable to sell. The Flanders purchase the house and bid farewell to the Simpsons.

Meanwhile, Snake escapes from the prison and, after unsuccessfully trying to decapitate Homer using a piano wire tied to a tree (but slicing off Kirk Van Houten's right arm in the process), jumps into Li'l Bandit to retrieve the car from him. They start fighting each other to gain control of the moving car, and Chief Wiggum starts chasing them when he is awoken from having a nap in his police car.

Feeling guilty about her deception and concerned for the Flanders' safety, Marge goes to check on them at their new house. There, she tells them the truth about the murders, but they are not upset. Ned and Maude are pleased to be a part of Springfield's history and refuse Marge's offer of returning the deposit. However, the house is destroyed seconds later when Li'l Bandit and Wiggum's police car crash through it. Marge returns Ned's down payment. Hutz, furious at the destruction costs and especially by the return of the money, fires Marge. Afterward, Homer takes her to the government unemployment office to collect a welfare check.

== Production ==
The writers wanted to do a "Marge episode", but one where her job does not work out, unlike previous episodes. The episode marks the first appearance of Gil Gunderson, voiced by Dan Castellaneta, and Cookie Kwan, voiced by Tress MacNeille. Excuses were made by the writers to bring back Gil in future episodes based on Castellaneta's performance at the table read, which proved popular with the staff. Snake's prison number is 7F20, the production code of "The War of the Simpsons", the episode in which he first appeared. Snake's cellmate Johnny D's prison number, 5F06, is the production code of this episode.

The piano wire scene was meant to end with Kirk's sandwich being sliced just the way he wanted, until George Meyer suggested that his arm be cut off instead. Mike Scully described the ensuing laughter at his suggestion as the most intense he had ever heard from the staff, saying: "They were literally choking because the joke was so unexpected. It was a shocked kind of laugh, and it just started rolling, one of those laughs that build the more they reverberate through you." In the unemployment line, the unemployment recipient with the bucket hat and the beard is a caricature of Meyer. Due to Phil Hartman's death, the recurring characters of Lionel Hutz and Troy McClure were retired. As such, this episode is the last speaking appearance of Lionel Hutz, with him only being featured as a background character in some future episodes. Troy McClure's final appearance would be in "Bart the Mother", the third episode of season ten.

== Cultural references ==
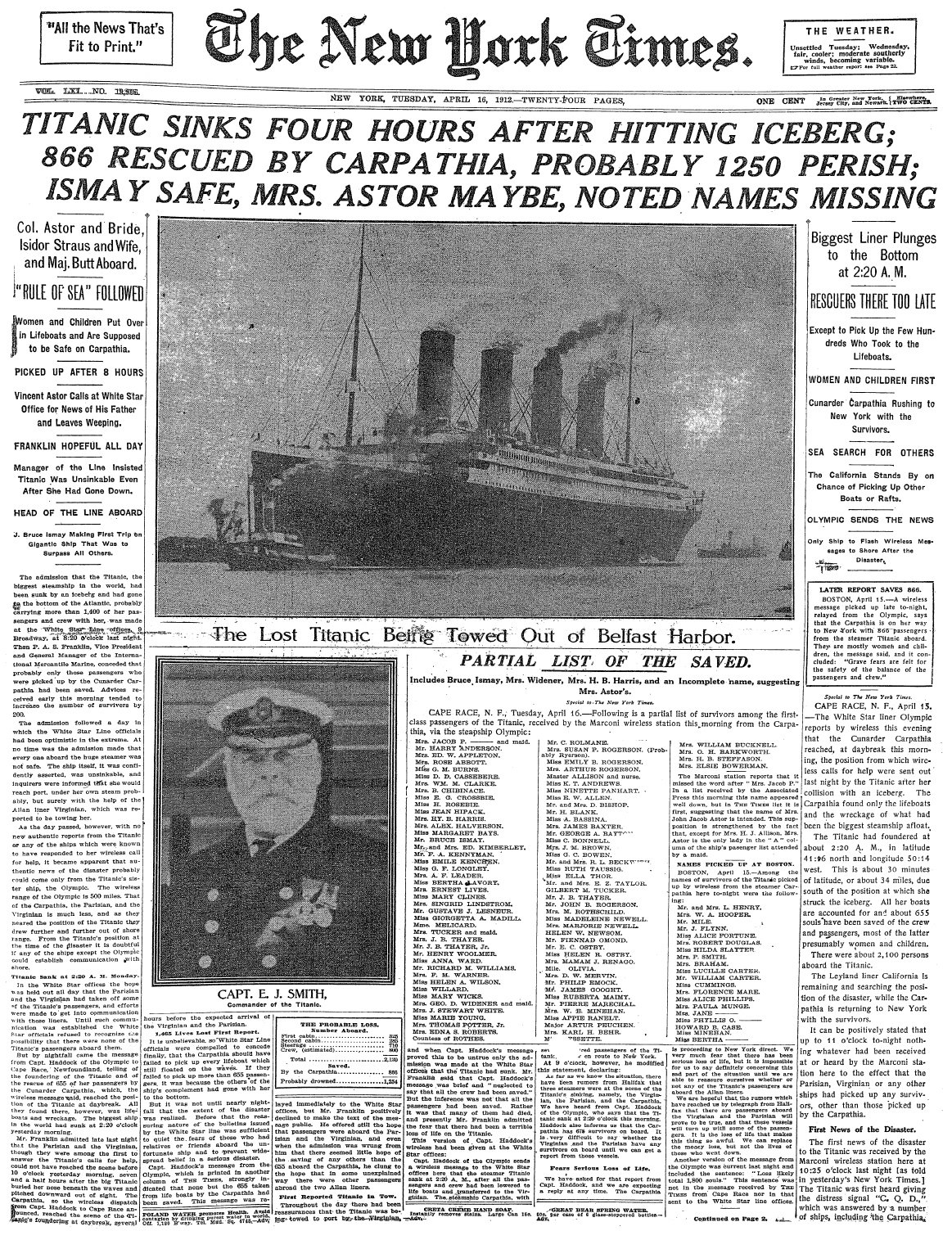
The episode references the front page of The New York Times on April 15, 1912, reporting the sinking of the RMS Titanic.

The title is a play on the title of Reality Bites (1994). Gil Gunderson is based on Jack Lemmon's portrayal of Shelley Levene in Glengarry Glen Ross (1992).

When Homer drives by Snake for the first time in the convertible he sings, "My name is Luka, and I live on the second floor." The lyrics are from the hit song "Luka" by Suzanne Vega.

At one point in the episode, Snake sets up a wire across a road to decapitate Homer as he drives by. The wire is supplied by "Acme", after the brand of equipment used by Wile E. Coyote to try and stop Road Runner in the Looney Tunes cartoons.

When Ned Flanders explains to Marge that they were painting Todd's room red, Todd starts saying "Red room, red room" and moves his finger, a reference to Danny intoning "Red Rum" in The Shining (1980).

Lionel Hutz reading the list of wrecked items to Marge is a tribute to the Lethal Weapon movies.

The newspaper front page reporting the "Jealous Jockey Murders" carries the statement "Mrs. Astor safe" beneath the headline. This is a reference to the front page of The New York Times on April 15, 1912, reporting the sinking of the RMS Titanic three days earlier while assuring that "Ismay safe, Mrs. Astor maybe".

== Reception ==
In its original broadcast, "Realty Bites" finished 21st in ratings for the week of December 1–7, 1997, with a Nielsen rating of 10.8, equivalent to approximately 10.6 million viewing households. It was the third-highest-rated show on the Fox network that week, following The X-Files and King of the Hill.

The authors of the book I Can't Believe It's a Bigger and Better Updated Unofficial Simpsons Guide said, "A simple but enjoyable romp, with the final few minutes in the Murder House particularly funny. Best thing though is the introduction of the hapless Gil, destined to always be a ray of light in any episode!"

Erik Adams praises Marge's character development: "Following 'Scenes From The Class Struggle In Springfield' and 'The Twisted World Of Marge Simpson,' this episode draws on Marge's solitary path without mocking her for choosing to walk it. These episodes expose the difficult truths of Marge's life, without placing any judgment on her life as a mother and wife. It allows for complexities within her character, complexities that 'Realty Bites' and Julie Kavner put to touching, funny use." He contrasts the roles of Marge and Homer: "'Realty Bites' is defined by Marge's non-adventure, but its climax requires the intrusion from Homer. Thrust into the type of scene he'd normally view from an outside perspective (vertically, on the couch, slurping kernels of popcorn from the bowl perched on his gut), the violence and messiness of the sequence is as quintessentially Homer as broken real estate dreams are quintessentially Marge."
