= The Cartridge Family =

5th episode of the 9th season of The Simpsons

- The Simpsons episode
- Homer examines his gun
- Episode no.: Season 9 Episode 5
- Directed by: Pete Michels
- Written by: John Swartzwelder
- Production code: 5F01
- Original air date: November 2, 1997

Episode features
- Chalkboard gag: "Everyone is tired of that Richard Gere story"
- Couch gag: Everybody has their posteriors on fire as they run to a water-filled couch. They hop on board as steam emerges from them.
- Commentary: Matt Groening; Mike Scully; Yeardley Smith; Pete Michels; George Meyer; Ian Maxtone-Graham; Donick Cary; Ron Hauge; John Swartzwelder

Episode chronology
← Previous "Treehouse of Horror VIII"	Next → "Bart Star"
- The Simpsons season 9

"The Cartridge Family" is the fifth episode of the ninth season of the American animated television series The Simpsons. It originally aired on Fox in the United States on November 2, 1997. It was written by John Swartzwelder and directed by Pete Michels. In the episode, Homer purchases a gun to protect his family, of which Marge disapproves. Homer begins to show extremely careless gun usage, which causes Marge to leave him when she catches Bart using the gun without their permission. The episode was intended to portray guns in an unbiased manner, and faced some problems with censors because of the subject matter. Critical reaction was mostly positive.

The episode was included on a 1999 UK VHS release titled "The Simpsons: Too Hot for TV", which included three other episodes that were deemed to be too raunchy for airing on television. The compilation was released on DVD in 2003.

== Plot ==
A soccer riot breaks out in Springfield after a boring match between Mexico and Portugal. Fearing for her family's safety, Marge tells Homer to buy a Home Security System, but after learning it would cost $500, he buys a handgun instead. After a five-day waiting period per the Brady Act (after which he is deemed "Potentially Dangerous" but is permitted to own three handguns at most), Homer shows his firearm to Marge, who is horrified and demands he get rid of it. Homer brings her to a local National Rifle Association meeting hoping to change her mind, but she remains unconvinced.

After a near accident at the dinner table, Marge again begs Homer to get rid of the gun. He promises to, but later, Bart and Milhouse find it in the refrigerator's vegetable crisper. Marge discovers this and berates Homer, then leaves with the children and checks into a motel, with Homer telling her to go and he'll be just fine. That night, Homer hosts an NRA meeting at his house, but the other members kick him out of the association after seeing how recklessly he uses his pistol (having used it as both a beer can opener and a TV remote control in their company). Realizing what his behavior has cost him, Homer goes to the motel and tells Marge he got rid of the gun.

While leaving, Snake arrives to rob the desk clerk. Homer pulls out his gun, and Marge is angry he lied again; as he tries to apologize, Snake snatches it. The other NRA members arrive, but fail to prevent Snake from escaping with the contents of the cash drawer. Homer then says he does not trust himself and asks Marge to throw the gun away herself. However, Marge sees a reflection of herself holding it in the trash can and feels empowered, so she decides to keep it for herself.

== Production ==
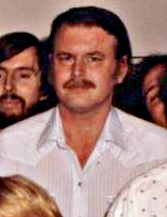
John Swartzwelder wrote the episode.

This was the first episode to air which was executive produced by Mike Scully. Sam Simon pitched an episode for one of the first seasons, which saw Homer getting a gun and nobody wanting him to have it. That episode would have concluded with Homer foiling a robbery and stating that although guns bring destruction, it worked for him. However, this episode was pitched by Scully for either season seven or eight, before being used for season nine. This provided the basic outline, and John Swartzwelder wrote the script. A lot of lines in the episode put guns in a positive light, as the staff felt that they could not just make an episode about how bad they were. Several of the staff, including Swartzwelder, are "pro gun", although others, such as Matt Groening, are completely against them. The episode was designed to be non-biased and to portray each side of the argument equally. Scully noted that if there is any message in the episode, it is that a man like Homer should not own a gun. The Fox Network censors were nervous about some of the episode's subject matter, such as Homer pointing the gun in Marge's face, and Bart aiming the gun at Milhouse with the apple in his mouth, but ultimately let it go.

The opening sequence where soccer is portrayed as the most boring sport imaginable was intended to show that soccer was more boring on television than live, but both Michels and Groening enjoy the game. Scully named the soccer players Ariaga and Ariaga II after jai alai players he had watched in the 1970s. The referee at the game is a caricature of the janitor at Film Roman, who supplied director Pete Michels with every piece of soccer information he needed to design the episode. Pelé also makes an appearance at the match, voiced by Hank Azaria. He is shown promoting a wax paper; Scully was unaware of Pele's reputation for advertising.

The episode closes with music from the 1960s spy series The Avengers. After the music had been recorded, Scully felt that it did not suit the ending. However, it was too late in production to get the full orchestra back to make a new recording, and union rules meant that previous recordings could not be reused.

== Cultural references ==
The chalkboard gag references the Richard Gere gerbil urban legend. The title is a play on the name of 1970s television series The Partridge Family.

It makes several references to past episodes. The gun store owner reviews Homer's background: "time in a mental hospital, problems with alcohol, beating up President Bush..." Marge: "Don't you remember when Maggie shot Mr. Burns?" Homer: "I thought Smithers did it." Lisa: "That would have made a lot more sense."

The end music is the theme to the 1960s British TV series The Avengers, and the song playing when Homer is sitting and watching things go by while he is waiting five days for his gun is "The Waiting" by Tom Petty and the Heartbreakers. Petty rarely let his music be used on television, but, being a fan of The Simpsons, he allowed them to use it.

== Reception ==
In its original broadcast, "The Cartridge Family" finished 26th in ratings for the week of October 27 – November 2, 1997, with a Nielsen rating of 10.5, equivalent to approximately 10.3 million viewing households. It was the third-highest-rated show on the Fox network, following The X-Files and King of the Hill.

The episode received several positive reviews, being included in the Herald Sun's list of the top twenty Simpsons episodes. It was also named the fifth-best episode in the show's history in an article by The Florida Times-Union. The Pittsburgh Post-Gazette also praised the episode, calling The Simpsons "the only sitcom in memory to treat gun control with any fairness".

On the other hand, the episode has been criticized by several outlets. Although the fictionalized NRA stress the importance of responsible gun ownership, the staff nonetheless received several complaints from the real National Rifle Association about the portrayal of the organization in the episode. Ian Jones and Steve Williams criticized the episode, calling it "a messy, unfocused lampooning of gun culture". Gary Russell and Gareth Roberts, the authors of the book I Can't Believe It's a Bigger and Better Updated Unofficial Simpsons Guide, found that it was "one of the most politically unambiguous episodes ever", but that "[it] is very dull and the plot isn't sustainable". Anna Leszkiewicz in the New Statesman later pinpointed it as the moment Marge should have left Homer, saying "Homer has proved himself to be a violent, unstable, controlling, reckless husband".

The episode was not initially aired on the United Kingdom satellite channel Sky1 due to scenes of flagrant gun misuse, yet was aired several times on BBC Two in an earlier evening timeslot. The episode has since been aired in daytime slots on all channels which have broadcast The Simpsons in the UK, albeit with a partial editing that implied Marge did dispose of the gun.
