= Lisa the Simpson =

- The Simpsons episode
- Fearing she has inherited the “Simpson gene”, Lisa envisions herself as an obese woman who needs a boat oar to get out of a hammock. This scene has become popular online in recent years.
- Episode no.: Season 9 Episode 17
- Directed by: Susie Dietter
- Written by: Ned Goldreyer
- Production code: 4F24
- Original air date: March 8, 1998

Guest appearance
- Phil Hartman as Troy McClure

Episode features
- Couch gag: A vine grows in the middle of the living room. The Simpsons appear as fruits and vegetables.
- Commentary: Bill Oakley; Josh Weinstein; Ned Goldreyer; Susie Dietter

Episode chronology
← Previous "Dumbbell Indemnity"	Next → "This Little Wiggy"
- The Simpsons season 9

"Lisa the Simpson" is the seventeenth episode of the ninth season of the American animated television series The Simpsons. It originally aired on Fox in the United States on March 8, 1998. In the episode, Lisa fears that she may be genetically predisposed to lose her intelligence after Grampa tells her of a family gene that can permanently take away intelligence.

"Lisa the Simpson" was written by Ned Goldreyer and directed by Susie Dietter. This was the final episode with Bill Oakley and Josh Weinstein as show runners.

It received generally positive reviews from critics, and is considered one of the best episodes of the ninth season.

== Plot ==
At Springfield Elementary, Lisa is presented with a brain teaser featuring strange hieroglyphs, which she is unable to solve. Following this incident, Lisa finds herself unable to perform simple tasks. Later, Lisa tells Grampa about her recent cognitive problems. He seems to recognize this, and tells Lisa about the "Simpson Gene", which apparently causes all members of the Simpson family to gradually lose their intelligence as they get older.

Lisa tries to accept the inevitable by watching lowbrow television with Homer and Bart, and reluctantly tries to join in the two messily eating candy bars from a hidden stash minutes before dinner. She has a sudden vision of a bleak future in which she is grossly obese and unintelligent, speaks in a Southern white trash accent, and is married to Ralph Wiggum and the two live in a trailer with their numerous children, while Lisa spends her days lazing in a hammock and watching soap operas.

After running away, Lisa appears on the TV news program Smartline to tell the citizens of Springfield to treasure their brains. As she does this, Homer decides to prove her wrong, and contacts the entire extended Simpson family to visit. However, when they arrive, Homer realizes they are also unsuccessful, unintelligent people, which only depresses Lisa further and causes Homer to send them home.

However, before they leave, Marge urges Homer to talk to the Simpson women. Reluctantly, he talks to one of them at her request and he discovers that the women are all successful. Lisa asks why the women in her family were not affected by the "Simpson Gene". Dr. Simpson reveals that the defective gene is only found in the Y-chromosome and only the males are affected. As a female, Dr. Simpson tells Lisa that she will be successful like they are. She is relieved that she is fine and she will not suffer the "Simpson Gene". When Bart realizes he will be a failure in life due to his gender, he is wary and bemoaning his future. However, Homer reassures him that he will be a spectacular failure. Lisa is soon finally able to solve the brain teaser she was unable to finish earlier in the episode; the answer was "6", with the hieroglyphs being 1, 2, 3, 4 and 5 but mirror-imaged.

Meanwhile in the subplot, Jasper visits the Kwik-E-Mart and empties the freezer containing ice cream in order to freeze himself, with the intention of being defrosted sometime in the distant future. Apu decides to exploit this unusual situation for financial gain, exhibiting Jasper as "Frostillicus". The convenience store, now renamed the "Freak-E-Mart", becomes profitable as a tourist trap, until the freezer's cooling system fails (after Apu had turned it up to its highest setting when he noticed Jasper's fingers twitching), causing Jasper to defrost and walk away. Apu then decides to turn the Kwik-E-Mart into a nude nightclub called the "Nude-E-Mart".

== Production ==
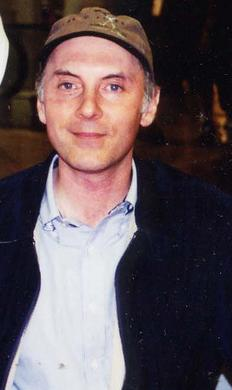
Dan Castellaneta, the voice of Homer, also voiced Homer's male relatives introduced in this episode.

"Lisa the Simpson" was the final episode for a number of crew members. It was the last episode run by Bill Oakley and Josh Weinstein, as it was a carry-over from season 8. Susie Dietter, one of the directors of the show, and Brad Bird, the show's executive consultant, also left the show after this episode. Dietter returned for one episode in season 18, "Yokel Chords", while Bird left to write and direct The Iron Giant.

Oakley and Weinstein wanted to end on a good note, with Weinstein stating that the episode "was meant to embody the humor, depth, and emotions of The Simpsons". They also wished to have an episode that was based on the background of every character they could do, and believed that this episode came out well. The title of the episode was the center of an argument between Oakley and Goldreyer, as Oakley had originally wanted to name it "Lisa the Simpson", although Goldreyer wanted "Suddenly Stupid", a play on the show Suddenly Susan.

The extended Simpsons' family members took some time to make, but the staff enjoyed the results. All of the male Simpson family members that showed up were voiced by Dan Castellaneta, the voice of Homer. He had asked for the recording tape to be run for about 20 minutes, so he could do many different voice variations that would fit the different men, but still be close to Homer's voice. The brainteaser in the episode was created by David X. Cohen.

== Cultural references ==
Lisa, puzzling over the brainteaser, says "It's not Egyptian... It's not Prince's names..." On When Buildings Collapse, the House of Usher falls. Lisa urges people to enjoy books like To Kill a Mockingbird, Harriet the Spy and Yertle the Turtle, "possibly the best book written on the subject of turtle stacking".

== Reception ==
In its original broadcast, "Lisa the Simpson" finished 19th in ratings for the week of March 2–8, 1998, with a Nielsen rating of 10.7, equivalent to approximately 10.4 million viewing households. It was the second highest-rated show on the Fox network that week, following The X-Files.

IGN's Todd Gilchrist named the episode as one of his favorites of the ninth season in his review of the DVD boxset. The authors of the book I Can't Believe It's a Bigger and Better Updated Unofficial Simpsons Guide, Warren Martyn and Adrian Wood, thought well of the episode, saying, "A terrific episode, with a good mix of pathos (Lisa's farewell to the Springsonian and her favourite jazz club are inspired) and fun (her Homeresque 'woo-hoo') which comes together to make a refreshing and exciting look at Lisa's life."

Bill Oakley and Josh Weinstein greatly enjoyed the episode and thought of it as a great final episode that they ran. On the DVD audio commentary, writer Ned Goldreyer stated, "I think this might have been the best episode ever produced."
