= Brian Scully =

American television writer and producer (born 1953)

- Born: August 10, 1953 (age 73); West Springfield, Massachusetts, U.S.
- Occupations: Television writer and producer and Creative Consultant
- Years active: 1988-present

Brian Scully (born August 10, 1953 in West Springfield, Massachusetts) is an American television writer and producer.

Scully initially worked as a TV salesman before eventually getting a job writing on Out of This World. After the show was canceled, Scully was unemployed for over a year but a residual payment of $20,000 for Out of This World reruns helped pay his health insurance costs after his wife gave birth to their premature child. He has written episodes for The Simpsons (such as "Lost Our Lisa") and Complete Savages. He has produced The Drew Carey Show and The Pitts. He is the older brother of long-time The Simpsons writer and showrunner Mike Scully, and has a brother, Neil, whose resume includes hockey writing for local newspapers and team magazines. He currently works on Family Guy as a writer and consulting producer.

== The Simpsons episodes ==
Brian Scully wrote the following episodes for The Simpsons:

- "Lost Our Lisa" - May 10, 1998
- "Sunday, Cruddy Sunday" (co-written with Tom Martin, George Meyer, and Mike Scully) - January 31, 1999
- "Make Room for Lisa" - February 28, 1999

== Family Guy episodes ==
Brian Scully wrote the following episodes for Family Guy:

- "I Dream of Jesus" - October 5, 2008
- "Big Man on Hippocampus" - January 3, 2010
- "Friends of Peter G." - February 13, 2011
- "Leggo My Meg-O" - May 6, 2012
- "Bigfat" - April 14, 2013
- "Vestigial Peter" - October 6, 2013
