= Primetime Emmy Award for Outstanding Writing for a Variety Special =

Annual film award

Primetime Emmy Award for Outstanding Writing for Variety Special
- Awarded for: Outstanding Writing for Variety Special
- Country: United States
- Presented by: Academy of Television Arts & Sciences
- Currently held by: The Muppet Show (2026)
- Website: emmys.com

The Primetime Emmy Award for Outstanding Writing for a Variety Special is awarded to one television special each year. In the 1960s and between 1979 and 2008, specials competed alongside nominees for Outstanding Writing for a Variety Series.

In the following list, the first titles listed in gold are the winners; those not in gold are nominees, which are listed in alphabetical order. The years given are those in which the ceremonies took place:

== Winners and nominations ==
=== 1970s ===
Year	Program	Nominees	Network
Outstanding Writing Achievement in Comedy, Variety or Music
1970
1970	Annie, the Women in the Life of a Man	Gary Belkin, Peter Bellwood, Thomas Meehan, Herb Sargent and Judith Viorst	CBS
1970	Rowan & Martin's Laugh-In: "Buddy Hackett"	Jim Carlson, John Carsey, Jack Douglas, Gene Farmer, Coslough Johnson, Paul Keyes, Jeremy Lloyd, Marc London, Allan Manings, Jim Mulligan, David Panich, John Rappaport and Stephen Spears	NBC
1970	Rowan & Martin's Laugh-In: "Nancy Sinatra"	Jim Abell, Jim Carlson, John Carsey, Jack Douglas, Chet Dowling, Gene Farmer, Coslough Johnson, Jeremy Lloyd, Marc London, Allan Manings, Jim Mulligan, David Panich, John Rappaport, Stephen Spears and Barry Took	NBC
Outstanding Writing Achievement in Comedy, Variety or Music
1971
1971	Singer Presents Burt Bacharach	Bob Ellison and Marty Farrell	CBS
1971	The Doris Mary Anne Kappelhoff Special	Alex Barris, Gary Belkin, Ernest Chambers and Saul Ilson	CBS
1971	Timex Presents Jack Benny's 20th Anniversary Special	Hal Goldman, Al Gordon, Hilliard Marks and Hugh Wedlock	NBC
1972
1972	The Trial of Mary Lincoln	Anne Howard Bailey	PBS
1972	Jack Lemmon in 'S Wonderful, 'S Marvelous, 'S Gershwin	Martin Charnin	NBC
1972	Julie and Carol at Lincoln Center	Bob Ellison, Marty Farrell, Ken Welch and Mitzi Welch	CBS
1973
1973	Acts of Love and Other Comedies	Joseph Bologna and Renée Taylor	ABC
1973	Liza with a Z	Fred Ebb	NBC
1973	The Lily Tomlin Show	Ann Elder, Karyl Geld, Allan Manings, Richard Pryor, John Rappaport, Jim Rusk, Lily Tomlin, Jane Wagner, Rod Warren and George Yanok	CBS
Best Writing in Comedy-Variety, Variety or Music (A Special Program)
1974
1974	Lily	Rosalyn Drexler, Ann Elder, Karyl Geld, Robert Illes, Lorne Michaels, Richard Pryor, Jim Rusk, Herb Sargent, James Stein, Lily Tomlin, Jane Wagner, Rod Warren and George Yanok	ABC
1974	Barbra Streisand...and Other Musical Instruments	Larry Gelbart, Ken Welch and Mitzi Welch	CBS
1974	Paradise	Joseph Bologna and Renée Taylor	CBS
Outstanding Writing in a Comedy-Variety or Music Special
1975
1975	Shirley MacLaine: If They Could See Me Now	John Bradford, Cy Coleman and Robert Wells	CBS
1975	Lily	Sybil Adelman, Gloria Banta, Stuart Birnbaum, Barbara Gallagher, Lorne Michaels, Marilyn Suzanne Miller, Pat Nardo, Matt Neuman, Earl Pomerantz, Rosie Ruthchild, Lily Tomlin and Jane Wagner	ABC
1976
1976	Lily Tomlin	Ann Elder, Christopher Guest, Lorne Michaels, Earl Pomerantz, Jim Rusk, Lily Tomlin, Jane Wagner, Rod Warren and George Yanok	ABC
1976	Gypsy in My Soul	Fred Ebb	CBS
1976	Mitzi...Roarin' in the 20's	Jerry Mayer	CBS
1976	Van Dyke and Company	Allan Blye, George Burditt, Bob Einstein, Robert Illes, Steve Martin, Jack Mendelsohn, Rick Mittleman, James Stein and Dick Van Dyke	NBC
1977
1977	America Salutes Richard Rodgers: The Sound of His Music	Buz Kohan and Ted Strauss	CBS
1977	The Barry Manilow Special	Steve Binder, Don Clark, Susan Clark, Barry Manilow, Ronny Pearlman, Alan Thicke and Bruce Vilanch	ABC
1977	An Evening with Diana Ross	Bill Dyer and Ntozake Shange	NBC
1977	John Denver and Friend	George Schlatter and Digby Wolfe	ABC
1977	Sills and Burnett at the Met	Gail Parent, Kenny Solms, Ken Welch and Mitzi Welch	CBS
1978
1978	The Paul Simon Special	Chevy Chase, Tom Davis, Al Franken, Charles Grodin, Lorne Michaels, Paul Simon, Lily Tomlin and Alan Zweibel	NBC
1978	Bette Midler: Ol' Red Hair Is Back	Jerry Blatt, Tom Eyen, Buz Kohan, Pat McCormick, Bette Midler, Bruce Vilanch and Rod Warren	NBC
1978	The George Burns One-Man Show	Fred Fox, Seaman Jacobs and Elon Packard	CBS
1978	The Second Barry Manilow Special	Ernest Chambers and Barry Manilow	ABC
1978	The Sentry Collection Presents Ben Vereen: His Roots	Michael H. Kagan	ABC
1979	No award given (Note: In 1979, the only award for writing in a variety program was Outstanding Writing in a Comedy or Comedy-Variety or Music Series. The winner was Alan Alda for the M*A*S*H episode "Inga".)		

=== 1980s ===
Year	Program	Nominees	Network
Outstanding Writing in a Variety or Music Program
1980
1980	Shirley MacLaine... Every Little Moment	Buz Kohan	CBS
1980	Carol Burnett & Company with Sally Field	Bob Arnott, Roger Beatty, Dick Clair, Tim Conway, Ann Elder, Arnie Kogen, Buz Kohan, Jenna McMahon and Kenny Solms	ABC
1980	Goldie and Liza Together	Fred Ebb	CBS
1980	The Muppet Show with Alan Arkin	Jim Henson, Don Hinkley, Jerry Juhl and David Odell	Syndicated
1980	Saturday Night Live with Teri Garr	Peter Aykroyd, Anne Beatts, Tom Davis, Jim Downey, Brian Doyle-Murray, Al Franken, Lorne Michaels, Matt Neuman, Don Novello, Sarah Paley, Herb Sargent, Tom Schiller, Harry Shearer, Rosie Shuster, Alan Zweibel, Tom Gammill and Max Pross	NBC
Outstanding Writing in a Variety, Music or Comedy Program
1981
1981	The Muppet Show with Carol Burnett	Jerry Juhl, Chris Langham and David Odell	Syndicated
1981	The American Film Institute Salute to Fred Astaire	Joseph McBride and George Stevens Jr.	CBS
1981	Lily: Sold Out	Nancy Audley, Ann Elder, Irene Mecchi, Elaine Pope, Ziggy Steinberg, Rocco Urbisci, Jane Wagner and Rod Warren	CBS
1981	Sylvia Fine Kaye's Musical Comedy Tonight II	Sylvia Fine Kaye	PBS
1981	The Tonight Show Starring Johnny Carson 18th Anniversary Show	Michael Barrie, Greg Fields, Hal Goodman, Larry Klein, Pat McCormick, Jim Mulholland, Kevin Mulholland, Gary Murphy, Raymond Siller and Robert Smith	NBC
Outstanding Writing in a Variety or Music Program
1982
1982	SCTV Network: "Moral Majority"	Jeffrey Barron, Dick Blasucci, John Candy, Chris Cluess, Bob Dolman, Joe Flaherty, Paul Flaherty, Stuart Kreisman, Eugene Levy, Andrea Martin, John McAndrew, Brian McConnachie, Rick Moranis, Catherine O'Hara, Mert Rich, Michael Short, Doug Steckler and Dave Thomas	NBC
1982	I Love Liberty	Richard Alfieri, Rita Mae Brown, Norman Lear, Rick Mitz and Arthur Allan Seidelman	ABC
1982	SCTV Network: "The Great White North Palace"	Dick Blasucci, John Candy, Tom Couch, Bob Dolman, Joe Flaherty, Paul Flaherty, Eddie Gorodetsky, Eugene Levy, Andrea Martin, John McAndrew, Rick Moranis, Don Novello, Catherine O'Hara, Michael Short, Doug Steckler and Dave Thomas	NBC
1982	SCTV Network: "I'm Taking My Own Head..."	Jeffrey Barron, Dick Blasucci, John Candy, Bob Dolman, Joe Flaherty, Paul Flaherty, Eugene Levy, Andrea Martin, John McAndrew, Rick Moranis, Catherine O'Hara, Mert Rich, Doug Steckler and Dave Thomas	NBC
1982	SCTV Network: "SCTV Staff Christmas Party"	Jeffrey Barron, Dick Blasucci, John Candy, Bob Dolman, Joe Flaherty, Paul Flaherty, Eugene Levy, Andrea Martin, John McAndrew, Rick Moranis, Catherine O'Hara, Doug Steckler and Dave Thomas	NBC
1983
1983	SCTV Network: "Sweeps Week"	Dick Blasucci, John Candy, Bob Dolman, Joe Flaherty, Paul Flaherty, Eugene Levy, Andrea Martin, John McAndrew, Martin Short, Michael Short, Doug Steckler and Mary Charlotte Wilcox	NBC
1983	SCTV Network: "Christmas 1982"	Dick Blasucci, John Candy, Bob Dolman, Joe Flaherty, Paul Flaherty, Eugene Levy, Andrea Martin, John McAndrew, Catherine O'Hara, Martin Short, Michael Short, Doug Steckler and Mary Charlotte Wilcox	NBC
1983	SCTV Network: "Jane Eyrehead"	Jeffrey Barron, Dick Blasucci, John Candy, Bob Dolman, Joe Flaherty, Paul Flaherty, Eugene Levy, Andrea Martin, John McAndrew, Martin Short, Michael Short, Doug Steckler, Dave Thomas and Mary Charlotte Wilcox	NBC
1983	SCTV Network: "Midnight Cowboy II"	Jeffrey Barron, Dick Blasucci, John Candy, Bob Dolman, Joe Flaherty, Paul Flaherty, Eugene Levy, Andrea Martin, John McAndrew, Martin Short, Michael Short, Doug Steckler and Mary Charlotte Wilcox	NBC
1983	SCTV Network: "Towering Inferno"	Jeffrey Barron, Dick Blasucci, John Candy, Bob Dolman, Joe Flaherty, Paul Flaherty, Eugene Levy, Andrea Martin, John McAndrew, Martin Short, Michael Short, Doug Steckler, Dave Thomas and Mary Charlotte Wilcox	NBC
1984
1984	Late Night with David Letterman: "312"	Chris Elliott, Sanford Frank, Ted Greenberg, David Letterman, Merrill Markoe, Jeff Martin, Gerard Mulligan, Steve O'Donnell, Joe Toplyn, Matt Wickline and David Yazbek	NBC
1984	38th Tony Awards	Hildy Parks	CBS
1984	The 6th Annual Kennedy Center Honors	L.T. Ilehart, Marc London, Sara Lukinson and George Stevens Jr.	CBS
1984	The American Film Institute Salute to Lillian Gish	Joseph McBride and George Stevens Jr.	CBS
1984	Late Night with David Letterman: "285"	Andy Breckman, Jim Downey, Sanford Frank, David Letterman, Merrill Markoe, George Meyer, Gerard Mulligan and Steve O'Donnell	NBC
1984	Late Night with David Letterman: "291"	Jim Downey, Chris Elliott, Sanford Frank, David Letterman, Merrill Markoe, George Meyer, Gerard Mulligan, Steve O'Donnell, Joe Toplyn, Matt Wickline, Tom Gammill and Max Pross	NBC
1984	Saturday Night Live: "Billy Crystal, Ed Koch, Edwin Newman, Don Novello and Betty Thomas"	Jim Belushi, Andy Breckman, Robin Duke, Adam Green, Mary Gross, Nate Herman, Tim Kazurinsky, Kevin Kelton, Andrew Kurtzman, Michael McCarthy, Eddie Murphy, Pamela Norris, Margaret Oberman, Joe Piscopo, Herb Sargent, Andrew Smith, Bob Tischler and Eliot Wald	NBC
1985
1985	Late Night with David Letterman: "Christmas with the Lettermans"	Randy Cohen, Kevin Curran, Chris Elliott, Sanford Frank, Eddie Gorodetsky, Fred Graver, Larry Jacobson, David Letterman, Merrill Markoe, Jeff Martin, Gerard Mulligan, Joe Toplyn and Matt Wickline	NBC
1985	The American Film Institute Salute to Gene Kelly	Jeffrey Lane and George Stevens Jr.	CBS
1985	Late Night with David Letterman: "Late Night in Los Angeles"	Randy Cohen, Kevin Curran, Chris Elliott, Sanford Frank, Fred Graver, Larry Jacobson, David Letterman, Merrill Markoe, Jeff Martin, Gerard Mulligan, Steve O'Donnell, Joe Toplyn and Matt Wickline	NBC
1985	Late Night with David Letterman: "The Late Night Morning Show"	Randy Cohen, Kevin Curran, Chris Elliott, Sanford Frank, Fred Graver, Larry Jacobson, David Letterman, Jeff Martin, Gerard Mulligan, Steve O'Donnell, Joe Toplyn and Matt Wickline	NBC
1985	Motown Returns to the Apollo	Peter Elbling, Buz Kohan and Samm-Art Williams	NBC
1986
1986	Late Night with David Letterman 4th Anniversary Special	Randy Cohen, Kevin Curran, Chris Elliott, Sanford Frank, Fred Graver, Larry Jacobson, David Letterman, Merrill Markoe, Jeff Martin, Gerard Mulligan, Steve O'Donnell, Joe Toplyn and Matt Wickline	NBC
1986	40th Tony Awards	Hildy Parks	CBS
1986	The American Film Institute Salute to Billy Wilder	Jeffrey Lane and George Stevens Jr.	NBC
1986	Sylvia Fine Kaye's Musical Comedy Tonight III	Sylvia Fine Kaye	PBS
1986	The Tonight Show Starring Johnny Carson: "David Letterman, Maureen McGovern and Adela Rivera"	Michael Barrie, Gary Belkin, Hal Goodman, Bob Keane, Larry Klein, Jim Mulholland, Kevin Mulholland, Raymond Siller, Andrew Nicholls and Darrell Vickers	NBC
1987
1987	Late Night with David Letterman 5th Anniversary Special	Randy Cohen, Kevin Curran, Chris Elliott, Sanford Frank, Fred Graver, Larry Jacobson, David Letterman, Jeff Martin, Gerard Mulligan, Steve O'Donnell, Adam Resnick, Joe Toplyn and Matt Wickline	NBC
1987	41st Tony Awards	Jeffrey Lane	CBS
1987	Saturday Night Live	Andy Breckman, A. Whitney Brown, Jean E. Carroll, Tom Davis, Jim Downey, Al Franken, Eddie Gorodetsky, Phil Hartman, George Meyer, Lorne Michaels, Kevin Nealon, Margaret Oberman, Herb Sargent, Marc Shaiman, Rosie Shuster, Robert Smigel, Bonnie and Terry Turner, Jon Vitti and Christine Zander	NBC
1987	The Tonight Show Starring Johnny Carson	Michael Barrie, Gary Belkin, Hal Goodman, Bob Keane, Larry Klein, Jim Mulholland, Kevin Mulholland, Raymond Siller, Andrew Nicholls and Darrell Vickers	NBC
1987	The Tracey Ullman Show: "The Lottery / Girl on a Ledge / Ambulance Pick Up"	Jerry Belson, Dick Blasucci, James L. Brooks, Ken Estin, Paul Flaherty, Marc Flanagan, Kim Fuller, Matt Groening, Susan Herring, Heide Perlman and Sam Simon	Fox
1988
1988	Jackie Mason on Broadway	Jackie Mason	HBO
1988	Late Night with David Letterman 6th Anniversary Special	Randy Cohen, Kevin Curran, Chris Elliott, Fred Graver, Boyd Hale, Larry Jacobson, David Letterman, Jeff Martin, Gerard Mulligan, Steve O'Donnell, Adam Resnick, Joe Toplyn and Matt Wickline	NBC
1988	The Smothers Brothers Comedy Hour 20th Reunion	Bob Arnott and Mason Williams	CBS
1988	The Tracey Ullman Show: "Ginny Redux / Fear / Real Lace"	Jerry Belson, Dick Blasucci, James L. Brooks, Ken Estin, Marc Flanagan, Matt Groening, Jay Kogen, Heide Perlman, Sam Simon, Tracey Ullman and Wallace Wolodarsky	Fox
1989
1989	Saturday Night Live	John Bowman, A. Whitney Brown, Greg Daniels, Tom Davis, Jim Downey, Al Franken, Shannon Gaughan, Jack Handey, Phil Hartman, George Meyer, Lorne Michaels, Mike Myers, Conan O'Brien, Bob Odenkirk, Herb Sargent, Tom Schiller, Robert Smigel, Bonnie and Terry Turner and Christine Zander	NBC
1989	Late Night with David Letterman 7th Anniversary Special	Rob Burnett, Randy Cohen, Kevin Curran, Chris Elliott, Fred Graver, Boyd Hale, Larry Jacobson, David Letterman, Jeff Martin, Gerard Mulligan, Steve O'Donnell, Adam Resnick, Joe Toplyn and Matt Wickline	NBC
1989	Not Necessarily the News	Larry Arnstein, Steve Barker, David Hurwitz, Billy Kimball, Matt Neuman and Lane Sarasohn	HBO
1989	The Tonight Show Starring Johnny Carson	Michael Barrie, Tony Desena, Hal Goodman, Bob Keane, Larry Klein, Jim Mulholland, Kevin Mulholland, Raymond Siller, Bob Smith, Patric Verrone, Andrew Nicholls and Darrell Vickers	NBC
1989	The Tracey Ullman Show: "5W76"	Jerry Belson, Dick Blasucci, James L. Brooks, Ken Estin, Marc Flanagan, Matt Groening, Jay Kogen, Heide Perlman, Michael Sardo, Sam Simon, Tracey Ullman and Wallace Wolodarsky	Fox

=== 1990s ===
Year	Program	Nominees	Network
Outstanding Writing in a Variety or Music Program
1990
1990	Billy Crystal: Midnight Train to Moscow	Billy Crystal	HBO
1990	The Tracey Ullman Show	Jay Kogen, James L. Brooks, Jerry Belson, Marc Flanagan, Dinah Kirgo, Marilyn Suzanne Miller, Heide Perlman, Ian Praiser, Sam Simon, Tracey Ullman and Wallace Wolodarsky	Fox
1990	In Living Color	Sanford Frank	Fox
1990	Late Night with David Letterman	Rob Burnett, Spike Feresten, Larry Jacobson, David Letterman, Gerard Mulligan, Steve O'Donnell, Maria Pope, Paul Simms and Steve Young	NBC
1990	Saturday Night Live	A. Whitney Brown, Greg Daniels, Tom Davis, Jim Downey, Al Franken, Jack Handey, Tom Hymes, Lorne Michaels, Mike Myers, Conan O'Brien, Bob Odenkirk, Herb Sargent, Tom Schiller, Rob Schneider, Robert Smigel, David Spade, Bonnie and Terry Turner and Christine Zander	NBC
1991
1991	63rd Academy Awards	Billy Crystal, Hal Kanter, Buz Kohan, David Steinberg, Bruce Vilanch and Robert Wuhl	ABC
1991	In Living Color	Fax Bahr, Kim Bass, John Bowman, Greg Fields, Les Firestein, Becky Hartman Edwards, J. J. Paulsen, Buddy Sheffield, Adam Small, Steve Tompkins, Pam Veasey, Keenen Ivory Wayans and Damon Wayans	Fox
1991	Late Night with David Letterman	Rob Burnett, Spike Feresten, Larry Jacobson, David Letterman, Gerard Mulligan, Steve O'Donnell, Maria Pope, Paul Simms and Steve Young	NBC
1991	The Muppets Celebrate Jim Henson	Jerry Juhl, Sara Lukinson and Bill Prady	CBS
1991	Saturday Night Live	A. Whitney Brown, Tom Davis, Jim Downey, Al Franken, Jack Handey, Lorne Michaels, Conan O'Brien, Bob Odenkirk, Andrew Robin, Adam Sandler, Herb Sargent, Rob Schneider, Robert Smigel, David Spade, Bonnie and Terry Turner and Christine Zander	NBC
Outstanding Individual Achievement in Writing in a Variety or Music Program
1992
1992	64th Academy Awards	Billy Crystal, Hal Kanter, Buz Kohan, Marc Shaiman, David Steinberg, Bruce Vilanch and Robert Wuhl	ABC
1992	In Living Color	Fax Bahr, John Bowman, Harry Dunn, Greg Fields, Les Firestein, Fred Graver, Becky Hartman Edwards, Michelle Jones, Buddy Sheffield, Adam Small, Michael Anthony Snowden, Steve Tompkins, Pam Veasey, Keenen Ivory Wayans, Damon Wayans, Larry Wilmore and Marc Wilmore	Fox
1992	Late Night with David Letterman	Rob Burnett, Jill Davis, Spike Feresten, Joe Furey, Larry Jacobson, Ken Keeler, David Letterman, Gerard Mulligan, Steve O'Donnell, Maria Pope, Adam Resnick, Bill Scheft, Paul Simms and Steve Young	NBC
1992	Saturday Night Live	Tom Davis, Jim Downey, Al Franken, Jack Handey, Warren Hutcherson, Steve Koren, Dan McGrath, Lorne Michaels, Adam Sandler, Herb Sargent, Rob Schneider, Robert Smigel, Bonnie and Terry Turner and Christine Zander	NBC
1992	The Tonight Show Starring Johnny Carson	Michael Barrie, Tony Desena, Tom Finnigan, Bob Keane, Jim Mulholland, Bob Smith, Andrew Nicholls and Darrell Vickers	NBC
1993
1993	The Ben Stiller Show	Judd Apatow, Robert Cohen, David Cross, Brent Forrester, Jeff Kahn, Bruce Kirschbaum, Bob Odenkirk, Sultan Pepper, Dino Stamatopoulos and Ben Stiller	Fox
1993	The Kids in the Hall	Paul Bellini, Dave Foley, Brian Hartt, Norm Hiscock, Bruce McCulloch, Kevin McDonald, Mark McKinney and Scott Thompson	HBO
1993	Late Night with David Letterman	Jon Beckerman, Rob Burnett, Donick Cary, Jill Davis, Spike Feresten, Larry Jacobson, David Letterman, Gerard Mulligan, Steve O'Donnell, Brian Reich, Bill Scheft and Steve Young	NBC
1993	Rick Reynolds: Only the Truth Is Funny	Rick Reynolds	Showtime
1993	Saturday Night Live	Tom Davis, Jim Downey, Al Franken, Jack Handey, Bruce Handy, Warren Hutcherson, Steve Koren, David Mandel, Ian Maxtone-Graham, Tim Meadows, Lorne Michaels, Vanessa Middleton, Adam Sandler, Herb Sargent, Robert Smigel, David Spade, Bonnie and Terry Turner and Christine Zander	NBC
1994
1994	Dennis Miller Live	Jeff Cesario, Mike Dugan, Eddie Feldmann, Gregory Greenberg, Dennis Miller and Kevin Rooney	HBO
1994	The Kids in the Hall	Paul Bellini, Garry Campbell, Diane Flacks, Dave Foley, Brian Hartt, Norm Hiscock, Andy Jones, Bruce McCulloch, Kevin McDonald, Mark McKinney and Scott Thompson	CBS
1994	Late Show with David Letterman	Nick Arnold, Jon Beckerman, Rob Burnett, Donick Cary, Jill Davis, Spike Feresten, Dave Hanson, Larry Jacobson, David Letterman, Gerard Mulligan, Steve O'Donnell, Bill Scheft, Jeff Stilson and Steve Young	CBS
1994	Mystery Science Theater 3000	Trace Beaulieu, Paul Chaplin, Frank Conniff, Bridget Jones, Jim Mallon, Kevin Murphy, Michael J. Nelson, Mary Jo Pehl, David Sussman and Colleen Williams	Comedy Central
1994	Tracey Ullman Takes On New York	Dick Clement, Marc Flanagan, Ian La Frenais, Stephen Nathan and Tony Sheehan	HBO
1995
1995	Dennis Miller Live	Jeff Cesario, Ed Driscoll, David Feldman, Eddie Feldmann, Gregory Greenberg, Dennis Miller and Kevin Rooney	HBO
1995	The Kids in the Hall	Paul Bellini, Garry Campbell, Diane Flacks, Dave Foley, Brian Hartt, Norm Hiscock, Andy Jones, Bruce McCulloch, Kevin McDonald, Mark McKinney and Scott Thompson	CBS
1995	Late Show with David Letterman Video Special	Michael Barrie, Jon Beckerman, Rob Burnett, Donick Cary, Jill Davis, Spike Feresten, Dave Hanson, Larry Jacobson, Chris Kelly, David Letterman, Jim Mulholland, Gerard Mulligan, Steve O'Donnell, Bill Scheft, Jeff Stilson and Steve Young	CBS
1995	Mystery Science Theater 3000	Trace Beaulieu, Paul Chaplin, Frank Conniff, Mike Dodge, Bridget Jones, Jim Mallon, Kevin Murphy, Michael J. Nelson, Mary Jo Pehl and Colleen Williams	Comedy Central
1995	Politically Incorrect with Bill Maher	Scott Carter, Christopher Case Erbland, Hayes Jackson, Tim Long and Eric Weinberg	Comedy Central
Outstanding Writing for a Variety or Music Program
1996
1996	Dennis Miller Live	David Feldman, Eddie Feldmann, Mike Gandolfi, Tom Hertz, Leah Krinsky, Dennis Miller and Rick Overton	HBO
1996	Late Night with Conan O'Brien	Tom Agna, Chris Albers, Tommy Blacha, Greg Cohen, Janine Ditullio, Ned Goldreyer, Michael Gordon, Jonathan Groff, Brian Kiley, Brian McCann, Conan O'Brien, Brian Reich, Andy Richter, Dino Stamatopoulos and Mike Sweeney	NBC
1996	Late Show with David Letterman Video Special II	Michael Barrie, Jon Beckerman, Rob Burnett, Donick Cary, Jill Davis, Davey DiGiorgio, Larry Jacobson, David Letterman, Tim Long, Jim Mulholland, Gerard Mulligan, Rodney Rothman, Bill Scheft, Stephen Sherrill, Joe Toplyn, Rob Young and Steve Young	CBS
1996	Politically Incorrect with Bill Maher	Chris Albers, Scott Carter, Christopher Case Erbland, Jon Hotchkiss, Hayes Jackson, Brian Jacobsmeyer, Chris Kelly, Bill Maher, Billy Martin and Eric Weinberg	Comedy Central
1996	Tracey Takes On...	Jerry Belson, Dick Clement, Kim Fuller, Jenji Kohan, Ian La Frenais, Molly Newman, Gail Parent, Tony Sheehan, Tracey Ullman and Allen J. Zipper	HBO
1997
1997	Chris Rock: Bring the Pain	Chris Rock	HBO
1997	Dennis Miller Live	David Feldman, Eddie Feldmann, Jim Hanna, Tom Hertz, Leah Krinsky, Dennis Miller and Rick Overton	HBO
1997	Late Night with Conan O'Brien 3rd Anniversary Show	Tom Agna, Chris Albers, Ellie Barancik, Tommy Blacha, Greg Cohen, Janine Ditullio, Michael Gordon, Jonathan Groff, Brian Kiley, Brian McCann, Conan O'Brien, Brian Reich, Andy Richter, Robert Smigel and Mike Sweeney	NBC
1997	Late Show with David Letterman	Michael Barrie, Jon Beckerman, Rob Burnett, Alex Gregory, Matt Harrigan, Peter Huyck, Eric Kaplan, David Letterman, Tim Long, Jim Mulholland, Gerard Mulligan, Rodney Rothman, Bill Scheft, Joe Toplyn and Steve Young	CBS
1997	Politically Incorrect with Bill Maher	Franklyn Ajaye, Scott Carter, Christopher Case Erbland, Al Franken, Jon Hotchkiss, Arianna Huffington, Hayes Jackson, Brian Jacobsmeyer, Bill Kelley, Chris Kelly, Bill Maher, Billy Martin, Ned Rice, Chris Rock, Geoff Rodkey, Michael Rotman, Jeff Stilson, Danny Vermont and Eric Weinberg	ABC
1997	Tracey Takes On...	Jerry Belson, Dick Clement, Ian La Frenais, Robert Klane, Jenji Kohan, Molly Newman, Gail Parent, Tracey Ullman and Allen J. Zipper	HBO
1998
1998	Dennis Miller Live	Jose Arroyo, David Feldman, Eddie Feldmann, Jim Hanna, Leah Krinsky, Dennis Miller and David Weiss	HBO
1998	The Chris Rock Show	Louis C.K., Lance Crouther, Gregory Greenberg, Jon Hayman, Paul Kozlowski, Ali LeRoi, Steve O'Donnell, Chris Rock, Chuck Sklar, Jeff Stilson and Wanda Sykes	HBO
1998	Late Night with Conan O'Brien	Chris Albers, Ellie Barancik, Tommy Blacha, Greg Cohen, Janine Ditullio, Michael Gordon, Jonathan Groff, Brian Kiley, Brian McCann, Conan O'Brien, Brian Reich, Andy Richter, Brian Stack and Mike Sweeney	NBC
1998	Late Show with David Letterman	Gabe Abelson, Michael Barrie, Carter Bays, Jon Beckerman, Rob Burnett, Will Forte, Eric Kaplan, David Letterman, Tim Long, Jim Mulholland, Gerard Mulligan, Rodney Rothman, Eric Stangel, Justin Stangel, Craig Thomas, Joe Toplyn and Steve Young	CBS
1998	Mr. Show with Bob and David	David Cross, Jay Johnston, Bob Odenkirk, Bill Odenkirk, Brian Posehn, Dino Stamatopoulos, Michael Stoyanov, Paul F. Tompkins and Mike Upchurch	HBO
1999
1999	The Chris Rock Show	Tom Agna, Vernon Chatman, Louis C.K., Lance Crouther, Gregory Greenberg, Ali LeRoi, Steve O'Donnell, Chris Rock, Frank Sebastiano, Chuck Sklar, Jeff Stilson, Wanda Sykes and Mike Upchurch	HBO
1999	Dennis Miller Live	Jose Arroyo, David Feldman, Eddie Feldmann, Jim Hanna, Leah Krinsky, Dennis Miller and David Weiss	HBO
1999	Late Night with Conan O'Brien	Chris Albers, Ellie Barancik, Tommy Blacha, Janine Ditullio, Jon Glaser, Michael Gordon, Jonathan Groff, Brian Kiley, Brian McCann, Conan O'Brien, Andy Richter, Brian Stack and Mike Sweeney	NBC
1999	Late Show with David Letterman	Gabe Abelson, Michael Barrie, Carter Bays, Jon Beckerman, Jeff Boggs, Rob Burnett, Chris Harris, David Javerbaum, David Letterman, Jim Mulholland, Gerard Mulligan, Rodney Rothman, Tom Ruprecht, Eric Stangel, Justin Stangel, Craig Thomas, Joe Toplyn and Steve Young	CBS
1999	Mr. Show with Bob and David	Scott Aukerman, Jerry Collins, David Cross, Jay Johnston, Bob Odenkirk, Bill Odenkirk, B. J. Porter, Brian Posehn and Dino Stamatopoulos	HBO

=== 2000s ===
Year	Program	Nominees	Network
Outstanding Writing for a Variety, Music or Comedy Program
2000
2000	Eddie Izzard: Dress to Kill	Eddie Izzard	HBO
2000	Chris Rock: Bigger & Blacker	Chris Rock	HBO
2000	The Chris Rock Show	Tom Agna, Vernon Chatman, Louis C.K., Lance Crouther, Nick Di Paolo, Ali LeRoi, Steve O'Donnell, Chris Rock, Chuck Sklar, Jeff Stilson, Halsted Sullivan, Wanda Sykes and Mike Upchurch	HBO
2000	Late Night with Conan O'Brien	Chris Albers, Ellie Barancik, Andy Blitz, Louis C.K., Janine Ditullio, Jon Glaser, Michael Gordon, Jonathan Groff, Roy Jenkins, Brian Kiley, Brian McCann, Conan O'Brien, Andy Richter, Robert Smigel, Brian Stack and Mike Sweeney	NBC
2000	Late Show with David Letterman	Gabe Abelson, Michael Barrie, Carter Bays, Rob Burnett, Chris Harris, David Letterman, Jim Mulholland, Gerard Mulligan, Rodney Rothman, Tom Ruprecht, Bill Scheft, Beth Sherman, Eric Stangel, Justin Stangel, Craig Thomas, Joe Toplyn and Steve Young	CBS
2001
2001	The Daily Show with Jon Stewart	Eric Drysdale, Jim Earl, Dan Goor, Charlie Grandy, J. R. Havlan, Tom Johnson, Kent Jones, Paul Mecurio, Chris Regan, Allison Silverman and Jon Stewart	Comedy Central
2001	The Chris Rock Show	Tom Agna, Lance Crouther, Nick Di Paolo, Daniel Dratch, Ali LeRoi, John Marshall, Steve O'Donnell, Chris Rock, Frank Sebastiano, Jeff Stilson, Wanda Sykes, Bryan Tucker and Mike Upchurch	HBO
2001	Late Night with Conan O'Brien	Chris Albers, Ellie Barancik, Andy Blitz, Janine Ditullio, Kevin Dorff, Jon Glaser, Michael Gordon, Jonathan Groff, Roy Jenkins, Brian Kiley, Brian McCann, Guy Nicolucci, Conan O'Brien, Brian Stack, Mike Sweeney and Andrew Weinberg	NBC
2001	Late Show with David Letterman	Eric Stangel, Justin Stangel, Gabe Abelson, Michael Barrie, Carter Bays, Lee Ellenberg, Chris Harris, David Letterman, Jim Mulholland, Gerard Mulligan, Tom Ruprecht, Bill Scheft, Craig Thomas, Joe Toplyn and Steve Young	CBS
2001	Saturday Night Live	James Anderson, Robert Carlock, Jerry Collins, Tony Daro, Jim Downey, Tina Fey, Hugh Fink, Melanie Graham, Tim Herlihy, Steve Higgins, Erik Kenward, Adam McKay, Dennis McNicholas, Lorne Michaels, Jerry Minor, Matt Murray, Paula Pell, Matt Piedmont, Jon Rosenfeld, Michael Schur, T. Sean Shannon, Robert Smigel, Barry Sobel, Andrew Steele and Scott Wainio	NBC
2002
2002	Saturday Night Live	Doug Abeles, James Anderson, Max Brooks, Jim Downey, Tina Fey, Hugh Fink, Charlie Grandy, Jack Handey, Steve Higgins, Erik Kenward, Dennis McNicholas, Lorne Michaels, Matt Murray, Paula Pell, Matt Piedmont, Ken Scarborough, Michael Schur, Frank Sebastiano, T. Sean Shannon, Robert Smigel, Emily Spivey, Andrew Steele and Scott Wainio	NBC
2002	America: A Tribute to Heroes	Eli Attie, Bill Clark, Chris Connelly, Terry Edmonds, Tom Fontana, Marshall Herskovitz, David Leaf, Ann Lewis, Peggy Noonan, Eugene Pack, Philip Rosenthal, Bob Shrum, David Wild and Edward Zwick	Syndicated
2002	The Daily Show with Jon Stewart	Aaron Bergeron, Jonathan Bines, Eric Drysdale, J. R. Havlan, David Javerbaum, Tom Johnson, Ben Karlin, Paul Mecurio, Chris Regan, Jason Reich and Jon Stewart	Comedy Central
2002	Late Night with Conan O'Brien	Chris Albers, Andy Blitz, Kevin Dorff, Jon Glaser, Michael Gordon, Brian Kiley, Michael Koman, Brian McCann, Guy Nicolucci, Conan O'Brien, Andrew Secunda, Allison Silverman, Robert Smigel, Brian Stack, Mike Sweeney and Andrew Weinberg	NBC
2002	Late Show with David Letterman	Eric Stangel, Justin Stangel, Gabe Abelson, Michael Barrie, Carter Bays, Lee Ellenberg, Jason Gelles, Jonathan Green, Chris Harris, Mike Haukom, David Letterman, Gabe Miller, Jim Mulholland, Gerard Mulligan, Tom Ruprecht, Bill Scheft, Craig Thomas, Joe Toplyn and Steve Young	CBS
2003
2003	The Daily Show with Jon Stewart	Rich Blomquist, Steve Bodow, Eric Drysdale, J. R. Havlan, Scott Jacobson, David Javerbaum, Tom Johnson, Ben Karlin, Rob Kutner, Chris Regan, Jason Reich, Jason Ross and Jon Stewart	Comedy Central
2003	Late Night with Conan O'Brien	Mike Sweeney, Chris Albers, Jose Arroyo, Andy Blitz, Kevin Dorff, Jon Glaser, Michael Gordon, Brian Kiley, Michael Koman, Brian McCann, Guy Nicolucci, Conan O'Brien, Andrew Secunda, Allison Silverman, Frank Smiley, Brian Stack and Andrew Weinberg	NBC
2003	Late Show with David Letterman	Eric Stangel, Justin Stangel, Michael Barrie, Lee Ellenberg, Jonathan Green, Steve Hely, Jim Kramer, David Letterman, Gabe Miller, Jim Mulholland, Gerard Mulligan, Matt Roberts, Tom Ruprecht, Bill Scheft and Steve Young	CBS
2003	Robin Williams: Live on Broadway	Robin Williams	HBO
2003	Saturday Night Live	Doug Abeles, Leo Allen, James Anderson, Max Brooks, Jim Downey, James Eagan, Tina Fey, Al Franken, Kristin Gore, Charlie Grandy, Steve Higgins, Erik Kenward, Dennis McNicholas, Lorne Michaels, Corwin Moore, Matt Murray, Paula Pell, Ken Scarborough, Michael Schur, Frank Sebastiano, T. Sean Shannon, Eric Slovin, Robert Smigel, Emily Spivey, Andrew Steele and Scott Wainio	NBC
2004
2004	The Daily Show with Jon Stewart	Rich Blomquist, Steve Bodow, Tim Carvell, Stephen Colbert, Eric Drysdale, J. R. Havlan, Scott Jacobson, David Javerbaum, Ben Karlin, Chris Regan, Jason Reich, Jason Ross and Jon Stewart	Comedy Central
2004	Chappelle's Show	Neal Brennan and Dave Chappelle	Comedy Central
2004	Chris Rock: Never Scared	Chris Rock	HBO
2004	Late Night with Conan O'Brien	Mike Sweeney, Chris Albers, Jose Arroyo, Andy Blitz, Kevin Dorff, Daniel J. Goor, Michael Gordon, Brian Kiley, Michael Koman, Demetri Martin, Brian McCann, Guy Nicolucci, Conan O'Brien, Allison Silverman, Brian Stack and Andrew Weinberg	NBC
2004	Late Show with David Letterman	Eric Stangel, Justin Stangel, Michael Barrie, Lee Ellenberg, Jonathan Green, Joe Grossman, David Letterman, Gabe Miller, Jim Mulholland, Gerard Mulligan, Matt Roberts, Tom Ruprecht, Bill Scheft, Jeremy Weiner and Steve Young	CBS
2005
2005	The Daily Show with Jon Stewart	Rich Blomquist, Steve Bodow, Tim Carvell, Stephen Colbert, Eric Drysdale, J. R. Havlan, Scott Jacobson, David Javerbaum, Ben Karlin, Rob Kutner, Chris Regan, Jason Reich, Jason Ross and Jon Stewart	Comedy Central
2005	Da Ali G Show	James Bobin, Sacha Baron Cohen, Rich Dahm, Jamie Glassman, Evan Goldberg, Ant Hines, Dan Mazer, Seth Rogen and Jeff Stilson	HBO
2005	Late Night with Conan O'Brien	Mike Sweeney, Chris Albers, Jose Arroyo, Andy Blitz, Kevin Dorff, Daniel J. Goor, Michael Gordon, Brian Kiley, Michael Koman, Brian McCann, Guy Nicolucci, Conan O'Brien, Allison Silverman, Frank Smiley, Brian Stack and Andrew Weinberg	NBC
2005	Late Show with David Letterman	Eric Stangel, Justin Stangel, Michael Barrie, Lee Ellenberg, Matthew Flanagan, Joe Grossman, David Letterman, David McHugh, Jim Mulholland, Gerard Mulligan, Matt Roberts, Tom Ruprecht, Frank Sebastiano, Jeremy Weiner and Steve Young	CBS
2005	Real Time with Bill Maher	Scott Carter, David Feldman, Brian Jacobsmeyer, Jay Jaroch, Chris Kelly, Bill Maher, Billy Martin, Ned Rice and Danny Vermont	HBO
2006
2006	The Daily Show with Jon Stewart	Rich Blomquist, Steve Bodow, Rachel Axler, Kevin Bleyer, Tim Carvell, Stephen Colbert, Eric Drysdale, J. R. Havlan, Scott Jacobson, David Javerbaum, Ben Karlin, Rob Kutner, Sam Means, Chris Regan, Jason Reich, Jason Ross and Jon Stewart	Comedy Central
2006	The Colbert Report	Michael Brumm, Stephen Colbert, Rich Dahm, Eric Drysdale, Rob Dubbin, Peter Gwinn, Jay Katsir, Laura Krafft, Frank Lesser and Allison Silverman	Comedy Central
2006	Late Night with Conan O'Brien	Mike Sweeney, Chris Albers, Jose Arroyo, Andy Blitz, Dan Cronin, Kevin Dorff, Daniel J. Goor, Michael Gordon, Tim Harrod, Berkley Johnson, Brian Kiley, Michael Koman, Brian McCann, Guy Nicolucci, Conan O'Brien, Brian Stack and Andrew Weinberg	NBC
2006	Late Show with David Letterman	Eric Stangel, Justin Stangel, Michael Barrie, Lee Ellenberg, Joe Grossman, David Letterman, Jim Mulholland, Matt Roberts, Tom Ruprecht, Sam Saltz, Meredith Scardino, Bill Scheft, Frank Sebastiano, Jeremy Weiner and Steve Young	CBS
2006	Real Time with Bill Maher	Ross Abrash, Scott Carter, David Feldman, Matt Gunn, Brian Jacobsmeyer, Jay Jaroch, Chris Kelly, Bill Maher, Billy Martin and Danny Vermont	HBO
2007
2007	Late Night with Conan O'Brien	Mike Sweeney, Chris Albers, Jose Arroyo, Dan Cronin, Kevin Dorff, Dan Goor, Michael Gordon, Berkley Johnson, Brian Kiley, Michael Koman, Tim Harrod, Brian McCann, Guy Nicolucci, Conan O'Brien, Brian Stack and Andrew Weinberg	NBC
2007	The Colbert Report	Stephen Colbert, Allison Silverman, Rich Dahm, Michael Brumm, Rob Dubbin, Eric Drysdale, Peter Gwinn, Jay Katsir, Laura Krafft and Frank Lesser	Comedy Central
2007	The Daily Show with Jon Stewart	Steve Bodow, Rachel Axler, Kevin Bleyer, Rich Blomquist, Tim Carvell, J. R. Havlan, Scott Jacobson, David Javerbaum, Ben Karlin, Rob Kutner, Josh Lieb, Sam Means, Jason Reich, Jason Ross and Jon Stewart	Comedy Central
2007	Late Show with David Letterman	Eric Stangel, Justin Stangel, Michael Barrie, Jim Mulholland, Steve Young, Tom Ruprecht, Lee Ellenberg, Matt Roberts, Jeremy Weiner, Joe Grossman, Meredith Scardino, Bill Scheft, Aaron Blitzstein, Bob Borden, Frank Sebastiano and David Letterman	CBS
2007	Real Time with Bill Maher	David Feldman, Matt Gunn, Brian Jacobsmeyer, Jay Jaroch, Chris Kelly, Bill Maher, Billy Martin, Jonathan Schmock, Danny Vermont and Scott Carter	HBO
2008
2008	The Colbert Report	Tom Purcell, Stephen Colbert, Allison Silverman, Rich Dahm, Michael Brumm, Rob Dubbin, Eric Drysdale, Peter Gwinn, Jay Katsir, Laura Krafft, Frank Lesser, Glenn Eichler, Peter Grosz, Bryan Adams, Barry Julien and Meredith Scardino	Comedy Central
2008	The Daily Show with Jon Stewart	Steve Bodow, Rory Albanese, Rachel Axler, Kevin Bleyer, Rich Blomquist, Tim Carvell, J. R. Havlan, Scott Jacobson, David Javerbaum, Rob Kutner, Josh Lieb, Sam Means, John Oliver, Jason Ross and Jon Stewart	Comedy Central
2008	Late Night with Conan O'Brien	Mike Sweeney, Chris Albers, Jose Arroyo, Dan Cronin, Kevin Dorff, Daniel J. Goor, Michael Gordon, Berkley Johnson, Brian Kiley, Michael Koman, Brian McCann, Guy Nicolucci, Conan O'Brien, Matt O'Brien, Brian Stack and Andrew Weinberg	NBC
2008	Late Show with David Letterman	Eric Stangel, Justin Stangel, Jim Mulholland, Michael Barrie, Steve Young, Tom Ruprecht, Lee Ellenberg, Matt Roberts, Jeremy Weiner, Joe Grossman, Bill Scheft, Bob Borden, Frank Sebastiano and David Letterman	CBS
2008	Saturday Night Live	Seth Meyers, Andrew Steele, Paula Pell, Doug Abeles, James Anderson, Alex Baze, Jim Downey, Charlie Grandy, Steve Higgins, Colin Jost, Erik Kenward, Rob Klein, John Lutz, Lorne Michaels, Simon Rich, Marika Sawyer, Akiva Schaffer, Robert Smigel, John Solomon, Emily Spivey, Kent Sublette, Bryan Tucker, Robert Carlock and Lauren Pomerantz	NBC
Outstanding Writing for a Variety, Music or Comedy Special
2009
2009	Chris Rock: Kill the Messenger	Chris Rock	HBO
2009	The 81st Annual Academy Awards	Jon Macks, Jenny Bicks, Bill Condon, John Hoffman, Phil Alden Robinson, Bruce Vilanch, Dan Harmon, Rob Schrab, Ben Schwartz and Joel Stein	ABC
2009	Louis C.K.: Chewed Up	Louis C.K.	Showtime
2009	Ricky Gervais: Out of England – The Stand-Up Special	Ricky Gervais	HBO
2009	You're Welcome America. A Final Night with George W. Bush	Will Ferrell	HBO

=== 2010s ===
Year	Program	Nominees	Network
2010
2010	The 63rd Annual Tony Awards	Dave Boone and Paul Greenberg	CBS
2010	The 82nd Annual Academy Awards	Jon Macks, Bruce Vilanch, Steve Martin, Beth Armogida, Dave Barry, David Feldman, Carol Leifer, Jeffrey Richman, Marc Shaiman, Colleen Werthmann and Scott Wittman	ABC
2010	Bill Maher... But I'm Not Wrong	Bill Maher	HBO
2010	The Kennedy Center Honors	George Stevens Jr., Michael Stevens, Sara Lukinson and Lewis Friedman	CBS
2010	Wanda Sykes: I'ma Be Me	Wanda Sykes	HBO
2011
2011	The 64th Annual Tony Awards	Dave Boone, Matt Roberts and Mo Rocca	CBS
2011	Colin Quinn: Long Story Short	Colin Quinn	HBO
2011	Louis C.K.: Hilarious	Louis C.K.	Epix
2011	Night of Too Many Stars: An Overbooked Concert for Autism Education	Eric Slovin, Russ Armstrong, Andy Blitz, R.J. Fried, Brian Huskey, Anthony King, Dan Mintz, Jason Reich, Craig Rowin, Andrew Secunda, Robert Smigel, Anthony Jeselnik and Adam Moerder	Comedy Central
2011	The Women of SNL	Paula Pell, Seth Meyers, Emily Spivey and John Solomon	NBC
2012
2012	Louis C.K.: Live at the Beacon Theatre	Louis C.K.	FX
2012	The 65th Annual Tony Awards	Dave Boone and Paul Greenberg	CBS
2012	The 84th Annual Academy Awards	Jon Macks, Dave Boone, Carol Leifer, Tim Carvell, Jeff Cesario, Billy Crystal, Ed Driscoll, Billy Martin, Ben Schwartz, Marc Shaiman, Eric Stangel, Justin Stangel, David Steinberg, Mason Steinberg and Colleen Werthmann	ABC
2012	Betty White's 90th Birthday: A Tribute to America's Golden Girl	Jon Macks, Steve Ridgeway, Mason Steinberg and Brad Lachman	NBC
2012	The Kennedy Center Honors	George Stevens Jr., Michael Stevens, Sara Lukinson and Lewis Friedman	CBS
2013
2013	Louis C.K.: Oh My God	Louis C.K.	HBO
2013	The 66th Annual Tony Awards	Dave Boone and Paul Greenberg	CBS
2013	The 70th Annual Golden Globe Awards	Barry Adelman, Tina Fey, Amy Poehler, Jon Macks, Dave Boone, Alex Baze, Robert Carlock, Seth Meyers and Mike Scully	NBC
2013	Night of Too Many Stars: America Comes Together for Autism Programs	Eric Slovin, Doug Abeles, Ethan T. Berlin, Luke Cunningham, R.J. Fried, Dan Klein, Eric Ledgin, Doug Lieblich, Dan Mirk, Craig Rowin and Robert Smigel	Comedy Central
2013	Saturday Night Live Weekend Update Thursday (Part One)	Seth Meyers, Colin Jost, James Anderson, James Downey, Steve Higgins, Zach Kanin, Chris Kelly, Joe Kelly, Erik Kenward, Rob Klein, Lorne Michaels, John Mulaney, Michael Patrick O'Brien, Josh Patten, Sarah Schneider, Pete Schultz, Frank Sebastiano, John Solomon, Kent Sublette and Alex Baze	NBC
2014
2014	Sarah Silverman: We Are Miracles	Sarah Silverman	HBO
2014	The 67th Annual Tony Awards	Dave Boone and Paul Greenberg	CBS
2014	The 71st Annual Golden Globe Awards	Barry Adelman, Tina Fey, Amy Poehler, Jon Macks, Dave Boone, Alex Baze, Robert Carlock, Sam Means, Seth Meyers and Michael Shoemaker	NBC
2014	The Beatles: The Night That Changed America	Ken Elrich and David Wild	CBS
2014	Billy Crystal: 700 Sundays	Billy Crystal	HBO
2015
2015	Louis C.K.: Live at the Comedy Store	Louis C.K.	LouisCK.net
2015	The 72nd Annual Golden Globe Awards	Barry Adelman, Tina Fey, Amy Poehler, Jon Macks, Dave Boone, Alex Baze, Robert Carlock, Eric Gurian, Sam Means, Seth Meyers, Meredith Scardino and Michael Shoemaker	NBC
2015	Key & Peele Super Bowl Special	Brendan Hunt, Keegan-Michael Key, Jordan Peele and Rich Talarico	Comedy Central
2015	Mel Brooks: Live at the Geffen	Mel Brooks	HBO
2015	Saturday Night Live 40th Anniversary Special	James Anderson, Fred Armisen, Tina Fey, Steve Higgins, Chris Kelly, Erik Kenward, Rob Klein, Seth Meyers, Lorne Michaels, John Mulaney, Paula Pell, Jeff Richmond, Andy Samberg, Akiva Schaffer, Tom Schiller, Sarah Schneider, Marc Shaiman, Michael Shoemaker, Robert Smigel, Emily Spivey, Kent Sublette, Jorma Taccone and Bryan Tucker	NBC
2016
2016	Patton Oswalt: Talking for Clapping	Patton Oswalt	Netflix
2016	Amy Schumer: Live at the Apollo	Amy Schumer	HBO
2016	John Mulaney: The Comeback Kid	John Mulaney	Netflix
2016	Tig Notaro: Boyish Girl Interrupted	Tig Notaro	HBO
2016	Triumph's Election Special 2016	Robert Smigel, David Feldman, R.J. Fried, Michael Koman, Brian Reich, Andy Breckman, Josh Comers, Raj Desai, Jarrett Grode, Ben Joseph, Matthew Kirsch, Michael Lawrence, Craig Rowin, Zach Smilovitz, David Taylor, Andy Weinberg, Ray James, Jesse Joyce, Jason Reich and Alex Scordelis	Hulu
2017
2017	Full Frontal with Samantha Bee Presents Not the White House Correspondents' Dinner	Jo Miller, Samantha Bee, Ashley Nicole Black, Pat Cassels, Eric Drysdale, Mathan Erhardt, Travon Free, Joe Grossman, Miles Kahn and Melinda Taub	TBS
2017	The 70th Annual Tony Awards	Dave Boone, Mike Gibbons, Lauren Greenberg, Ian Karmel, Ben Winston, Justin Shanes and James Corden	CBS
2017	Louis C.K. 2017	Louis C.K.	Netflix
2017	Sarah Silverman: A Speck of Dust	Sarah Silverman	Netflix
2017	Stephen Colbert's Live Election Night Democracy's Series Finale: Who's Going to Clean Up This Sh*t?	Jay Katsir, Opus Moreschi, Stephen Colbert, Michael Brumm, Nate Charny, Aaron Cohen, Cullen Crawford, Paul Dinello, Rob Dubbin, Ariel Dumas, Glenn Eichler, Django Gold, Gabe Gronli, Barry Julien, Daniel Kibblesmith, Matt Lappin, Michael Pielocik, Tom Purcell, Kate Sidley, Jen Spyra, Brian Stack and John Thibodeaux	Showtime
2018
2018	John Mulaney: Kid Gorgeous at Radio City	John Mulaney	Netflix
2018	Full Frontal with Samantha Bee Presents: The Great American* Puerto Rico (*It's Complicated)	Melinda Taub, Samantha Bee, Pat Cassels, Mike Drucker, Eric Drysdale, Mathan Erhardt, Miles Kahn, Nicole Silverberg, Ashley Nicole Black, Joe Grossman, Sean Crespo, Razan Ghalayini, Tyler Hall, Allana Harkin, Paul Myers, Halcyon Person and Mike Rubens	TBS
2018	Michelle Wolf: Nice Lady	Michelle Wolf	HBO
2018	Patton Oswalt: Annihilation	Patton Oswalt	Netflix
2018	Steve Martin & Martin Short: An Evening You Will Forget for the Rest of Your Life	Steve Martin and Martin Short	Netflix
2019
2019	Hannah Gadsby: Nanette	Hannah Gadsby	Netflix
2019	Adam Sandler: 100% Fresh	Adam Sandler	Netflix
2019	Amy Schumer Growing	Amy Schumer	Netflix
2019	Carpool Karaoke: When Corden Met McCartney Live from Liverpool	Matt Roberts, James Corden, Rob Crabbe, Lawrence Dai, Dicky Eagan, Nate Fernald, Lauren Greenberg, John Kennedy, Ian Karmel, James Longman, Jared Moskowitz, Sean O'Connor, Tim Siedell, Benjamin Stout, Louis Waymouth and Ben Winston	CBS
2019	Homecoming: A Film by Beyoncé	Beyoncé Knowles-Carter	Netflix
2019	Wanda Sykes: Not Normal	Wanda Sykes	Netflix

=== 2020s ===
Year	Program	Nominees	Network
2020
2020	Dave Chappelle: Sticks & Stones	Dave Chappelle	Netflix
2020	Hannah Gadsby: Douglas	Hannah Gadsby	Netflix
2020	John Mulaney & the Sack Lunch Bunch	John Mulaney and Marika Sawyer	Netflix
2020	Patton Oswalt: I Love Everything	Patton Oswalt	Netflix
2020	Seth Meyers: Lobby Baby	Seth Meyers	Netflix
2021
2021	Bo Burnham: Inside	Bo Burnham	Netflix
2021	8:46 - Dave Chappelle	Dave Chappelle	Netflix
2021	The Daily Show with Trevor Noah Presents: Jordan Klepper Fingers the Pulse - Into the MAGAverse	Devin Delliquanti and Zhubin Parang	Comedy Central
2021	John Lewis: Celebrating a Hero	Mitchell Marchand	CBS
2021	Stephen Colbert's Election Night 2020: Democracy's Last Stand Building Back America Great Again Better 2020	Ariel Dumas, Jay Katsir, Stephen T. Colbert, Delmonte Bent, Michael Brumm, River Clegg, Aaron Cohen, Nicole Conlan, Paul Dinello, Glenn Eichler, Django Gold, Gabe Gronli, Barry Julien, Michael Cruz Kayne, Eliana Kwartler, Matt Lappin, Felipe Torres Medina, Opus Moreschi, Asher Perlman, Tom Purcell, Kate Sidley, Brian Stack, John Thibodeaux, and Steve Waltien	Showtime
2022
2022	Jerrod Carmichael: Rothaniel	Jerrod Carmichael	HBO
2022	Ali Wong: Don Wong	Ali Wong	Netflix
2022	The Daily Show with Trevor Noah Presents: Jordan Klepper Fingers the Globe - Hungary for Democracy	Ian Berger, Devin Delliquanti, Jen Flanz, Jordan Klepper, Zhubin Parang and Scott Sherman	Comedy Central
2022	Nicole Byer: BBW (Big Beautiful Weirdo)	Nicole Byer	Netflix
2022	Norm Macdonald: Nothing Special	Norm Macdonald (posthumous)	Netflix
2023
2023	John Mulaney: Baby J	John Mulaney	Netflix
2023	Carol Burnett: 90 Years Of Laughter + Love	Jon Macks and Carol Leifer	NBC
2023	Chris Rock: Selective Outrage	Chris Rock	Netflix
2023	Wanda Sykes: I'm an Entertainer	Wanda Sykes	Netflix
2023	Would It Kill You to Laugh? Starring Kate Berlant & John Early	Kate Berlant, Andrew DeYoung and John Early	Peacock
2024
2024	Alex Edelman: Just for Us	Alex Edelman	HBO
2024	Jacqueline Novak: Get on Your Knees	Jacqueline Novak	Netflix
2024	John Early: Now More Than Ever	John Early	HBO
2024	Mike Birbiglia: The Old Man and the Pool	Mike Birbiglia	Netflix
2024	The Oscars	Jamie Abrahams, Rory Albanese, Amberia Allen, Tony Barbieri, Jonathan Bines, Joelle Boucai, Bryan Cook, Blaire Erskine, Devin Field, Gary Greenberg, Josh Halloway, Eric Immerman, Jesse Joyce, Jimmy Kimmel, Carol Leifer, Jon Macks, Mitch Marchand, Gregory Martin, Jesse McLaren, Molly McNearney, Keaton Patti, Danny Ricker, Louis Virtel and Troy Walker	ABC
2025
2025	SNL50: The Anniversary Special	James Anderson, Dan Bulla, Megan Callahan-Shah, Michael Che, Mikey Day, Mike DiCenzo, James Downey, Tina Fey, Jimmy Fowlie, Alison Gates, Sudi Green, Jack Handey, Steve Higgins, Colin Jost, Erik Kenward, Dennis McNicholas, Seth Meyers, Lorne Michaels, John Mulaney, Jake Nordwind, Ceara O'Sullivan, Josh Patten, Paula Pell, Simon Rich, Pete Schultz, Streeter Seidell, Emily Spivey, Kent Sublette, Bryan Tucker and Auguste White	NBC
2025	Conan O'Brien: The Kennedy Center Mark Twain Prize for American Humor	Jon Macks, Chris Convy, Lauren Greenberg, Skyler Higley, Ian Karmel and Sean O'Connor	Netflix
2025	Cunk on Life	Charlie Brooker, Ben Caudell, Erika Ehler, Charlie George, Eli Goldstone, Jason Hazeley, Lucia Keskin, Diane Morgan, Joel Morris and Michael Odewale	Netflix
2025	Sarah Silverman: PostMortem	Sarah Silverman	Netflix
2025	Your Friend, Nate Bargatze	Nate Bargatze	Netflix
2026
2026	The Muppet Show	Albertina Rizzo, Gabe Liedman, Nedaa Sweiss, Kelly Younger and Andrew Williams	Disney+
2026	Chris Fleming: Live at the Palace	Chris Fleming	HBO
2026	Nikki Glaser: Good Girl	Nikki Glaser	Hulu
2026	The Oscars	Amberia Allen, Jose Arroyo, Josh Comers, Dan Cronin, Jessie Gaskell, Skyler Higley, Berkley Johnson, Ian Karmel, Brian Kiley, Laurie Kilmartin, Carol Leifer, Todd Levin, Jon Macks, Conan O'Brien, Matt O'Brien, Agathe Panaretos, Mike Sweeney, Levi MacDougall and Eric Roth	ABC
2026	Wanda Sykes: Legacy	Wanda Sykes	Netflix

== Individuals with multiple awards ==
Totals include individuals wins for Outstanding Writing for a Variety, Music or Comedy Program.

3 wins

- Louis C.K. (2 consecutive)
- John Mulaney
- Lily Tomlin

2 wins

- Dave Boone (consecutive)
- Chris Rock

== Individuals with multiple nominations ==
Totals are for individuals nominated since 2009.

11 nominations

- Jon Macks

10 nominations

- Dave Boone

8 nominations

- Seth Meyers
- John Mulaney
- Wanda Sykes

6 nominations

- Louis C.K.

5 nominations

- Tina Fey
- Carol Leifer

4 nominations

- Alex Baze
- Paul Greenberg
- Ian Karmel
- Robert Smigel

3 nominations

- Barry Adelman
- Robert Carlock
- Lauren Greenberg
- R.J. Fried
- Patton Oswalt
- Paula Pell
- Amy Poehler
- Craig Rowin
- Marc Shaiman
- Michael Shoemaker
- Sarah Silverman
- Emily Spivey

2 nominations

- Rory Albanese
- Amberia Allen
- James Anderson
- Samantha Bee
- Jonathan Bines
- Ashley Nicole Black
- Michael Brumm
- Pat Cassels
- Dave Chappelle
- Aaron Cohen
- Stephen Colbert
- Josh Comers
- James Corden
- Billy Crystal
- Devin Delliquanti
- Paul Dinello
- Eric Drysdale
- Ariel Dumas
- John Early
- Glenn Eichler
- Mathan Erhardt
- David Feldman
- Lewis Friedman
- Hannah Gadsby
- Django Gold
- Gabe Gronli
- Joe Grossman
- Steve Higgins
- Skyler Higley
- Colin Jost
- Jesse Joyce
- Barry Julien
- Miles Kahn
- Jay Katsir
- Chris Kelly
- Erik Kenward
- Rob Klein
- Matt Lappin
- Sara Lukinson
- Sam Means
- Mitch Marchand
- Lorne Michaels
- Sean O'Connor
- Zhubin Parang
- Tom Purcell
- Chris Rock
- Sarah Schneider
- Amy Schumer
- Ben Schwartz
- Kate Sidley
- Eric Slovin
- John Solomon
- Brian Stack
- Mason Steinberg
- George Stevens Jr.
- Michael Stevens
- Kent Sublette
- Melinda Taub
- John Thibodeaux
- Bruce Vilanch
- Colleen Werthmann

== See also ==
- Primetime Emmy Award for Outstanding Writing for a Variety Series
