= Lily (1973 special) =

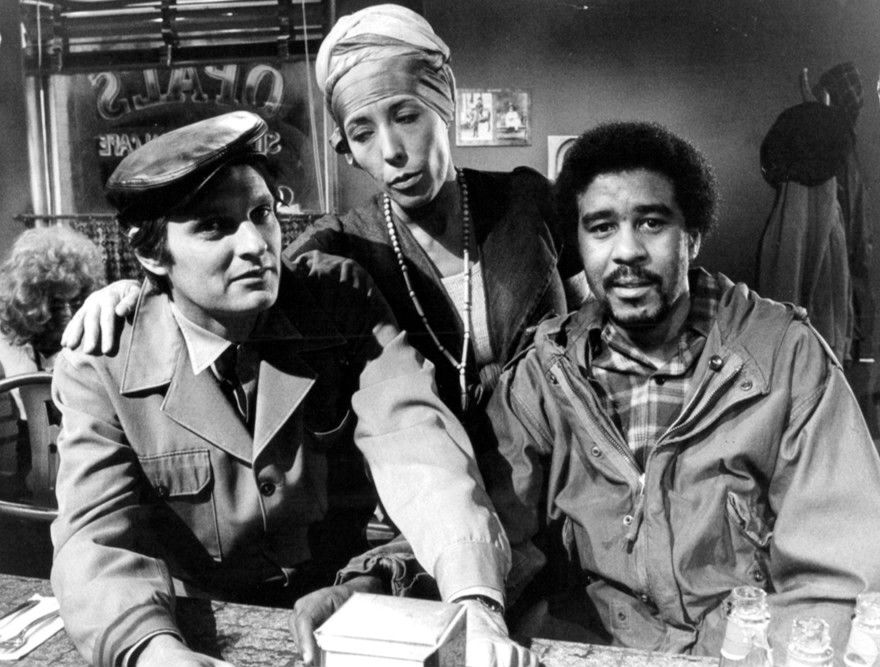
- Tomlin with Alan Alda and Richard Pryor (1973)
- Genre: Comedy special
- Written by: Stan Daniels; Rosalyn Drexler; Ann Elder; Robert Illes; Lorne Michaels; Karyl Geld Miller; Richard Pryor; Jim Rusk; Herb Sargent; James R. Stein; Lily Tomlin; Jane Wagner; Rod Warren; George Yanok
- Directed by: Rick Wallace
- Starring: Alan Alda; Richard Pryor; Lily Tomlin; Bill Gerber; Judith Kahan
- Country of origin: United States
- Original language: English

Production
- Executive producer: Bernard Sofronski
- Producer: Lorne Michaels
- Running time: 60 min.

Original release
- Network: CBS Television
- Release: 2 November 1973

Related
- Lily (1974 special); The Lily Tomlin Special

Lily is an American comedy variety show television special aired by CBS Television in 1973. The writing crew of fifteen all received an Emmy Award for their efforts on this show.

This program was the first of three specials, preceding Lily in 1974, and The Lily Tomlin Special in 1975.
