= All singing all dancing =

All singing all dancing may refer to:

- All singing, all dancing (idiom), meaning full of vitality, or full-featured
- "All Singing, All Dancing", a season-nine episode of The Simpsons
