= Jerry Mayer =

American playwright, producer and screenwriter

- Born: 1931 (age 94–95); St. Louis, Missouri, U.S.
- Occupations: Playwright, producer, screenwriter
- Spouse: Emily Mayer
- Children: 3

Jerry Mayer (born 1931) is an American playwright, producer and screenwriter. He developed the television series The Facts of Life with Howard Leeds and Ben Starr. Mayer is also the creator of the television series Tabitha. He was nominated for a Primetime Emmy Award in the category Outstanding Writing for Variety Special for his work on the television special Mitzi...Roarin' in the 20's.
