= All singing, all dancing =

Idiom

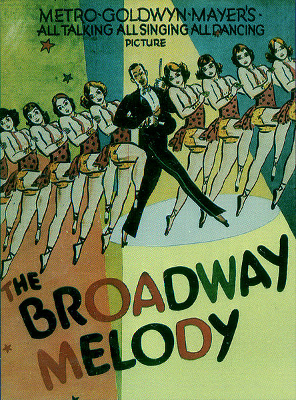
Poster advertising the 1929 film The Broadway Melody, from which the idiom is derived

All singing, all dancing is an idiom meaning "full of vitality", or, more recently, "full-featured". It originated with advertisements for the 1929 musical film The Broadway Melody, which proclaimed the film to be "All talking all singing all dancing".

The term actually predates talking films; it was used in 1895 to describe balladry as "primitive poetry."

== 20th century usage ==
In the height of the 20th century, from 1930 to about 1990, the idiom referred principally to entertainment such as films, musical performances, musicals, early video games, mazes, fictional books, and the like.

=== Musical theatre and films as escapism ===
So ubiquitous was the phrase used to describe the Broadway musical itself that it became the title of theatrical agent John Springer's 256-page, hardcover opus on the genre, All Talking All Singing All Dancing. Film musicals are all about "All Singing! All Dancing! All Broadway!"

Two retrospective films that covered the Classical Hollywood cinema of 1930s to the 1950s, That's Entertainment! and its sequel That's Entertainment, Part II, were described in 1976 as "all singing, all dancing, all celebrating life," with the focus on "the very epitome of ‘escapist entertainment’ shunning real-life problems, social awareness, you name it." Shown in theaters during the 1973–1975 recession, the first installment was marketed with the tag line, "Boy. Do we need it now," which emphasized the psychological need for escapism that watching nothing but singing and dancing affords, instead of worrying about stagflation, the Vietnam War, and other social problems. That was true from 1929, when the phrase came into popular consciousness: the front page of an article promising an early "all-talking, all-singing, all-dancing film" covered the horrific carnage of the Cleveland Clinic fire of 1929.

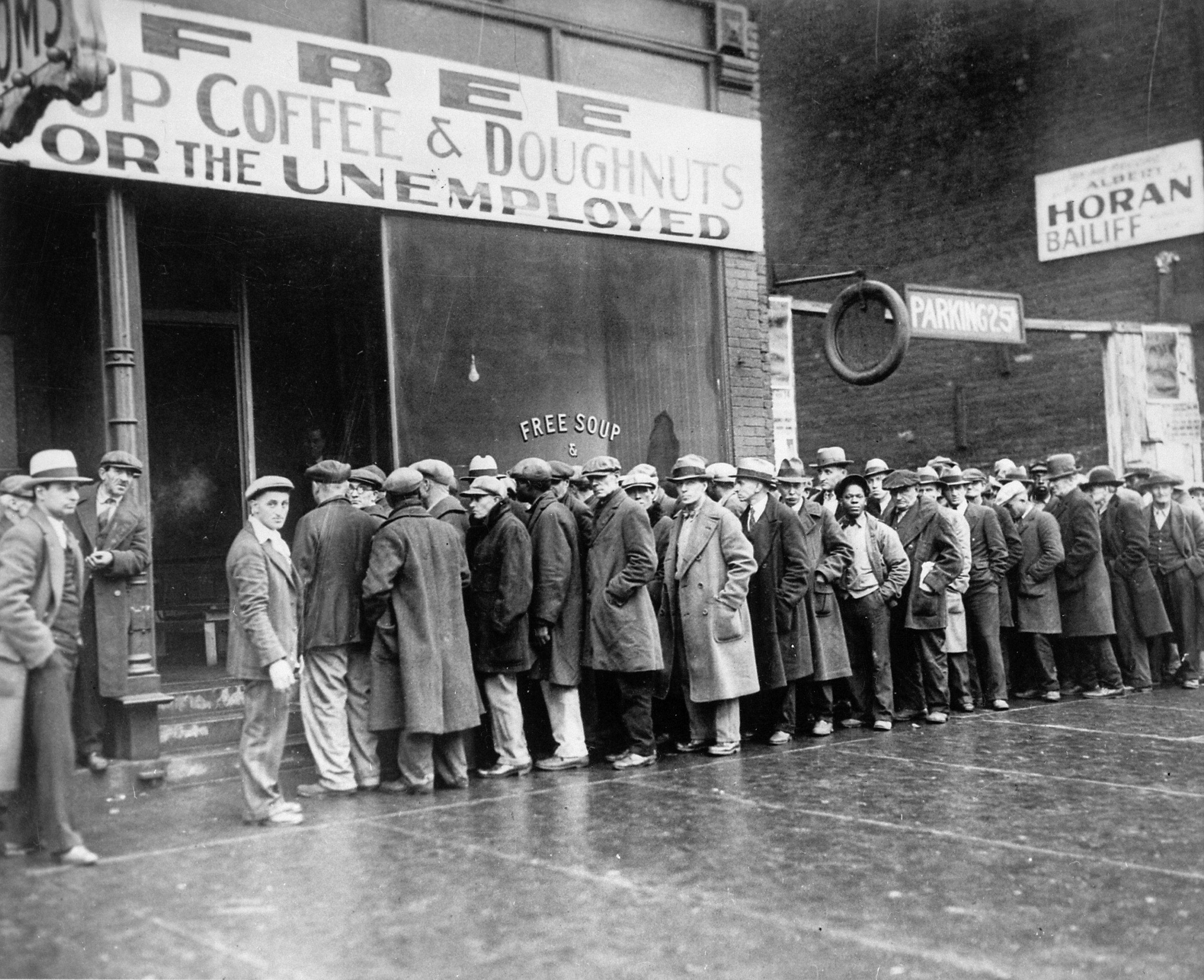
Unemployed men in 1931. The Great Depression profoundly influenced pre-Code Hollywood both financially and artistically.

By 1930, this genre of films and musicals was described as a bad fad, derided as "meaningless melanges of technicolored chorus girls and mechanical oop-a-dooping with such appalling frequency since the 'Broadway Medody' … a protracted orgy of all-singing, all-dancing, all-colored monstrosities." There was a "glutting [of] the market" by 1930, but by then, the phase was used to describe films that were not musicals. In fact, 1930 was the Dawn of the Decade of Escapism: Alan Brinkley, author of Culture and Politics in the Great Depression, presents how escapism became the new trend for dealing with the hardships created by the stock market crash in 1929: magazines, radio and movies, all were aimed to help people mentally escape from the mass poverty and economic downturn. This was a piece with escapist fiction, which metaphorically is dancing and singing set to words; readers turned to escapist fiction as it provided them a mental escape from the bleakness of the economy during that period of time.

=== Plot, characters, and themes ===
While serious drama, or even comedy, should have plot and characterization, the whole point to an "all dancing, all singing extravaganza" was that such a "revue leaves little room for plot." Even without plot or development, "singing, dancing extravaganza" can still make room for a wholesome theme, such as "doing things for other is what Christmas is all about." In fact, when it first appeared, Godspell was described as an "all-singing, all-dancing retelling of the Gospel according to St. Matthew."

== Late 20th and early 21st century uses ==
Starting in the mid-1990s, and continuing for the next three decades, the idiom also has come to be used to describe high tech gadgetry such as smartphones, indicating that the product is very advanced, ambitious, or has an abundance of features.

=== Extension of meanings ===
While originally from show business, such as theatre, stage shows, and movies, by extension to technology, the phrase has been recently "most often applied to some computer wizardry that seems to do everything."

For example, from a 1995 article in The Daily Telegraph:

"Satellites as small as a box of cornflakes can be launched at little cost by riding piggyback with larger satellites. A handful of these 'microsatellites' would be used instead of a single all-singing all-dancing 'platform' bristling with instruments."

The phrase also appears in the 1996 novel Fight Club, and the 1999 film based on it, in which the character Tyler Durden excoriates his disciples: "You're the all singing, all dancing crap of the world."

A 1998 episode of The Simpsons was titled "All Singing, All Dancing".

By 1999, the phrase was called "hackneyed" and "clichéd", and even extended by meaning to many machines, such as cars, in 2007, "Used jokingly to describe any piece of equipment or technology that is the latest model," and by 2010 to "an advanced computer or other gadget."

=== Continued musical use ===
Meanwhile, the idiom has continued to mean mindless musical merriment on Broadway, such as Tommy Tune's White tie and tales show, "All singing, all dancing Big Band show” of 2002, which was consciously produced with temporarily erasing the 9/11 terrorist attacks from the minds of the audience. This was extended to Off-off-Broadway and marijuana legalization, when La MaMa produced a musical described as "All Singing! All Dancing! All Legal! Cannabis!" The connections between "all-singing, all-dancing" and gay relationships is now explicit on Glee.

Bollywood has become the 21st century headquarters of all-singing, all dancing, which The Guardian, in reviewing a typical "turkey", wrote that they are:

fantastically awful. It's a product of a Bollywood machine that assumes that Indians have a subnormal intelligence and will watch anything. About 80% of all films made here are complete flops. The industry churns out a dizzying number of films, hoping that one will become the blockbuster that makes up for the rest.

— Bollywood nights: An all-singing, all-dancing, counter terrorism turkey

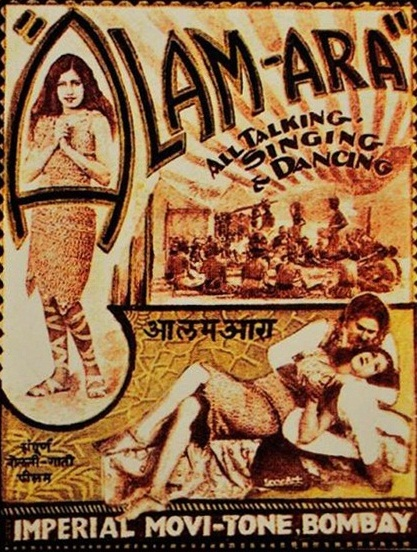
Theatrical release poster for Alam Ara

This really carries on an almost century of tradition, since Mumbai-based cinema industry has been from the very beginning in 1931 a center of musical dance number movies: the lost film, Alam Ara, directed by Ardeshir Irani, "was advertised as ‘All talking, all singing, all dancing’." A documentary has explored extensively this history of Indian all-dancing and all-singing film-making.

== See also ==
- The dictionary definition of all singing, all dancing at Wiktionary
- Bread and circuses
- Language change
- Metalepsis
- Metaphor
- Simile
