= Sheryl Zohn =

American television writer and producer

Sheryl Zohn (born 1973) is an American television writer and producer. She has written or produced for Showtime's Penn & Teller: Bullshit!, CNBC's Dennis Miller, Comedy Central's Straight Plan for the Gay Man, the Game Show Network's Friend or Foe?, VH1's Best Week Ever, and The Scariest Places on Earth.

Zohn lives in Los Angeles. She is married to The Daily Show writer Rob Kutner. In addition to her television work, she was a contributing author to the anthology The Modern Jewish Girl's Guide to Guilt. She also has contributed to American Bystander, Mad Magazine, The Weekly Humorist, and Belladonna Comedy.

She was nominated for Writers Guild of America Awards in 2006 and 2007, and for Emmy Awards in 2007 and 2009. She was a 2015 Honoree of the Writers Guild of America, West's Feature Writer Access Project.

In 2019, Zohn launched her podcast Who's Next Door with her walking partner Jesse Lainer-Vos.
