= Mark O'Donnell =

American dramatist

- Born: July 19, 1954; Cleveland, Ohio, U.S.
- Died: August 6, 2012 (aged 58); New York City, New York, U.S.
- Occupation: Writer
- Relatives: Steve O'Donnell (twin brother)

Mark O'Donnell (July 19, 1954 – August 6, 2012) was an American writer and humorist.

== Early life ==
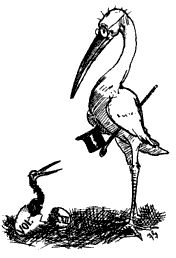
Harvard Lampoon's Ibis Mascot c.1888

Born in Cleveland, Ohio, he received his Bachelor of Arts degree from Harvard College in 1976. He was a member of The Harvard Lampoon, where he held the position of Ibis. In 1974, he helped produce a popular Sports Illustrated Lampoon parody (with Patricia Marx, Ian Frazier and his twin brother Steve O'Donnell, among others). In addition to writing for the parody, he and his twin brother Steve portrayed the Dromio twins, Siamese twins adept at football. He was the writer and librettist for three Hasty Pudding musicals for the Hasty Pudding Theatricals group.

== Career ==
O'Donnell and Thomas Meehan shared the 2003 Tony Award for Best Book of a Musical and the Drama Desk Award for Outstanding Book of a Musical for their work on Hairspray, and they wrote the 2007 film adaptation. The pair also worked on another John Waters musical adaptation, Cry-Baby, for which they received a 2008 Tony nomination.

His plays include That's It, Folks!; Fables for Friends; The Nice and the Nasty; Strangers on Earth; Vertigo Park; and the book and lyrics for the musical Tots in Tinseltown. Along with Bill Irwin, he wrote Scapin, a 1997 play adapted from the original by Molière.

His books include Elementary Education and Vertigo Park and Other Tall Tales, as well as two novels, Getting Over Homer and Let Nothing You Dismay.

He contributed to all three issues of George Meyer's Army Man, as well as to The New Yorker, The New York Times, The Atlantic and Spy. A 1980 article he wrote for Esquire, "O'Donnell's Laws of Cartoon Motion", was both widely quoted ("1. Anybody suspended in space will remain suspended in space until made aware of its situation") and widely circulated by fans of cartoon physics.

O'Donnell was also a writer for the 1981–1982 season of Saturday Night Live, under head writer Michael O'Donoghue. At Saturday Night Live, he wrote alongside Terry Southern.

O'Donnell was a longtime editorial advisor to the Yale Record and taught a comedy-writing seminar at Yale University.

=== Family ===
O'Donnell was the identical twin of television writer Steve O'Donnell. Mark was gay while his twin is straight.

== Death ==
He died in 2012 after collapsing in front of his apartment building on Riverside Drive in Manhattan. He was 58.
