= David Feldman (comedian) =

American comedian and podcaster

David Beauregard Feldman
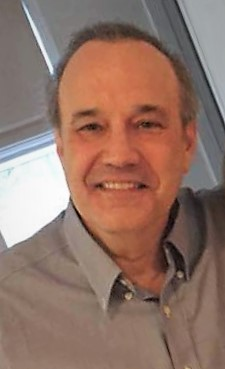
- Feldman on his podcast in 2016
- Occupations: Comedian, comedy writer, podcaster/radio host
- Political party: Democratic
- Children: ~6
- Website: shopdavidfeldman.com

David Beauregard Feldman is an American stand-up comedian, comedy writer, and podcaster.

Feldman is a graduate of Dwight Morrow High School in Englewood, New Jersey, and Columbia University in New York City. He began his career by performing stand-up comedy in San Francisco. He appeared on Late Night with Conan O'Brien, The Tonight Show, and The Late Late Show, and hosted his own special for Comedy Central. He achieved success as a comedy writer, winning three Primetime Emmy Awards (1995, 1996 and 1998), four Writers Guild Awards (1996, 1999, 2001 and 2017), and a CableACE Award (1995).

Feldman has contributed comedic material to televised award shows such as The Academy Awards and The Emmys. He wrote insult jokes for Triumph the Insult Comic Dog, and for roasts on Comedy Central. His other writing credits include:

- ABC's Roseanne
- Comedy Central's The Burn with Jeff Ross
- Comedy Central's The Daily Show with Jon Stewart
- Current TV's Joy Behar: Say Anything!
- Fox's Talk Show With Spike Feresten
- HBO's Dennis Miller Live
- HBO's Real Time with Bill Maher

Feldman is co-host of the Ralph Nader Radio Hour, with Ralph Nader and Steve Skrovan, on Pacifica Radio Network. Feldman has done commentary for Salon magazine, and appeared in Season 2, Episode 9 of Curb Your Enthusiasm (2001).

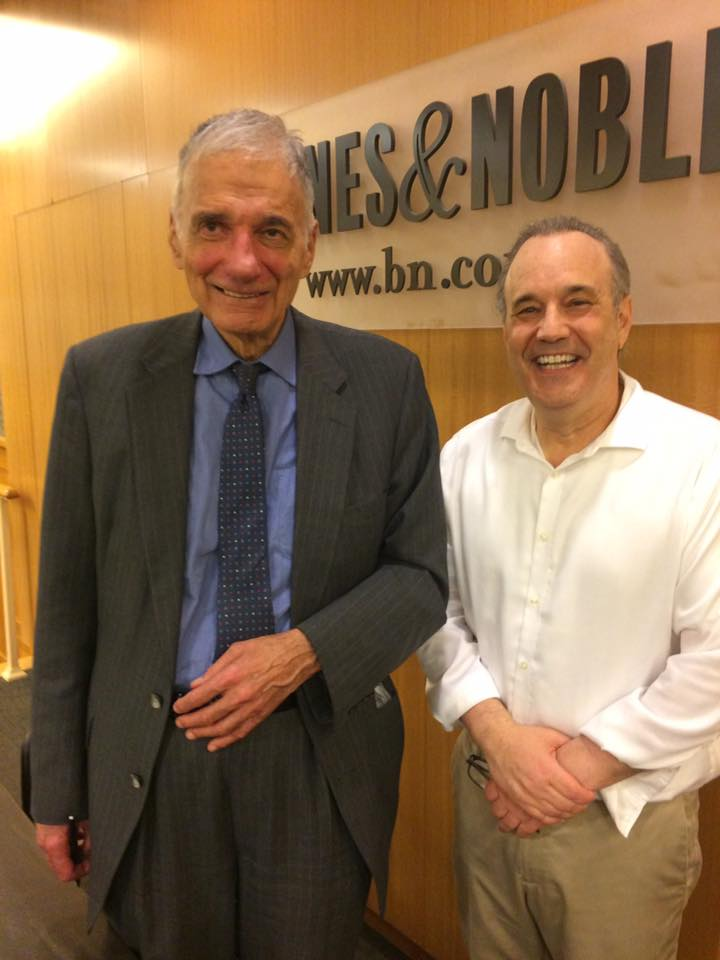
David co-hosts The Ralph Nader Radio Hour heard nationwide on Pacifica Radio Network.

In 2009, he launched the listener-supported David Feldman Show (formerly known as the David Feldman Comedy Podcast), which includes a mixture of live and prerecorded content. He later produced a digital download compilation album, The Very Best of the David Feldman Show, Vol. 1.

In 2009, he spoke at Pitzer College's Commencement Ceremony, and released a comedy album entitled Left Without Paying.

Feldman is a Democrat who has written jokes pro bono for candidates he supports. He currently resides in New York City. He has several ex-wives and "about" six kids.
