= All Singing, All Dancing =

- The Simpsons episode
- Episode no.: Season 9 Episode 11
- Directed by: Mark Ervin
- Written by: Steve O'Donnell
- Production code: 5F24
- Original air date: January 4, 1998

Guest appearances
- George Harrison as himself (clip from "Homer's Barbershop Quartet"); Phil Hartman as Lyle Lanley (clip from "Marge vs. the Monorail")

Episode features
- Couch gag: The floor is a treadmill. Marge, Lisa, Bart and Maggie successfully dismount from the treadmill onto the couch, while Homer gets stuck on it, yelling "Marge, stop this crazy thing!"
- Commentary: Matt Groening; David Mirkin; Steve O'Donnell; Hank Azaria; Yeardley Smith; Steven Dean Moore

Episode chronology
← Previous "Miracle on Evergreen Terrace"	Next → "Bart Carny"
- The Simpsons season 9

"All Singing, All Dancing" is the eleventh episode of the ninth season of the American animated television series The Simpsons. It originally aired on Fox in the United States on January 4, 1998. In the fourth Simpsons clip show, Homer claims he hates singing, so Marge shows family videos of musical numbers from previous seasons. The episode is in the form of a sung-through musical, featuring spoken dialogue only at the start and end of the episode. The original material was directed by Mark Ervin and written by Steve O'Donnell. It was executive produced by David Mirkin. It features guest appearances from George Harrison and Phil Hartman, although these are both clips and neither of them recorded original material for the episode.

== Plot ==
Homer and Bart rent the film Paint Your Wagon, expecting it to be a shoot-em-up Western. Homer is dismayed to find out that it is actually a musical, and expresses his distaste for such films. Marge is baffled by this, saying that he ironically loves singing. The family starts delivering their dialogue in song form, and Marge decides to prove that Homer loves to sing by showing family videos. Several clips are shown of various songs from past episodes, but Homer is not convinced. At this moment, Snake breaks into their house and holds them hostage. However, once he hears them singing, Snake decides that they would not make good hostages and leaves.

The family continues to sing and more videos are shown. Snake again breaks into the house and claims that he got a song stuck in his head and the only way to get rid of it is to kill the Simpsons. He tries to shoot them but discovers that his gun is out of ammunition and leaves again.

After more clips, Snake returns for a final time, with ammunition, and aims his gun at them, but the family reveals that they are done singing. Snake declares that he has no problem with them and leaves. When Marge starts humming a tune, however, he fires a warning shot through the window.

During the closing credits, Snake, still annoyed by all the music, shoots at the orchestra as they try to play the show's closing theme song. The third and final time they try to play, it is at a very soft volume, but Snake is not fooled and proceeds to shoot again, and once more when the Gracie Films logo music plays.

== Songs ==
The clip show features several full songs from previous episodes of The Simpsons.

Episode	Season	Song
"Homer's Barbershop Quartet"	5	"Baby on Board"
"Bart After Dark"	8	"We Put the Spring in Springfield"
"Boy-Scoutz 'n the Hood"	5	"Springfield, Springfield"
"Homer and Apu"	5	"Who Needs the Kwik-E-Mart?"
"Krusty Gets Kancelled"	4	Krusty's version of "Send In the Clowns"
"Two Dozen and One Greyhounds"	6	"See My Vest"
"Marge vs. the Monorail"	4	"The Monorail Song"
"Bart Sells His Soul"	7	"In the Garden of Eden" (really "In-A-Gadda-Da-Vida" by Iron Butterfly)
"Homer the Great"	6	"We Do"

Many of them are among the most popular songs from the show. "Who Needs The Kwik-E-Mart?" and "We Do" had previously been nominated for best song at the Primetime Emmy Awards, and "We Put the Spring in Springfield" won the award in 1997.

== Production ==
The episode is the fourth and penultimate clip show episode of The Simpsons. It was put together by Steve O'Donnell, who wrote this episode and "The Joy of Sect" (which, in production order, preceded this episode). Executive producer David Mirkin hated doing clip shows and "wouldn't do them if we had a choice" and this is referenced at the end of the episode. The episode contains two "screw the audience act breaks" in which a major problem is presented before the commercial but suddenly ends after the break. The episode also had problems with the censors as they objected to scenes of Snake pointing his shotgun at the Simpsons' baby daughter, Maggie. In spite of this, "All Singing, All Dancing" is one of the few episodes of The Simpsons that has been given a G-rating on American television.

== Cultural references ==
Clint Eastwood is dressed as the Man with No Name from the Dollars Trilogy films. The film Paint Your Wagon is referenced at the beginning of the episode. The film does star Eastwood and Lee Marvin and was directed by Joshua Logan, but the writers did not base their parody or the song on the film at all. The man in the film that confronts Eastwood is modelled after Lee Van Cleef and his character Colonel Douglas Mortimer from the Dollars film For a Few Dollars More.

Several of the songs featured in the episode are references to actual musicals. "Springfield, Springfield", sung by Bart and Milhouse, is a reference to "New York, New York", from On the Town. Krusty's "Send in the Clowns" uses different lyrics from the original version by Stephen Sondheim. Lyle Lanley's "The Monorail Song" takes references from a performance by character Professor Harold Hill in The Music Man, including Lanley's costume and "the crowd's mindless acceptance of his deceitful proposal". "See My Vest" is a parody of the song "Be Our Guest", sung by Jerry Orbach in the 1991 film Beauty and the Beast. While at the First Church of Springfield, Bart substitutes the lyrics from Iron Butterfly's "In-A-Gadda-Da-Vida" to "In the Garden of Eden".

== Reception ==
In its original broadcast, "All Singing, All Dancing" finished 26th in ratings for the week of December 29, 1997 – January 4, 1998, with a Nielsen rating of 9.1, equivalent to approximately 8.9 million viewing households. It was the second highest-rated show on the Fox network that week, following The X-Files.

Although he normally dislikes clip shows, Mirkin liked this episode because of the singing and dancing and called the clips "truly wonderful". The authors of the book I Can't Believe It's a Bigger and Better Updated Unofficial Simpsons Guide, Warren Martyn and Adrian Wood, wrote "for a clips show, it's not bad. The only one missing really is "Dr Zaius" from "A Fish Called Selma". In his book Planet Simpson, author Chris Turner wrote, "when songs spring up one at a time, you might notice a clever line or two, or the way that they serve the same kind of plot-advancing or energy-generating purposes they do in Singin' in the Rain or Cats, but piled together in ["All Singing, All Dancing"], they amount to a sort of Simpsonian side project: Springfield: The Musical. And ... it's a very impressive side project at that." The episode was nominated for a 1998 Emmy Award, in the "Music Direction" category. A review of The Simpsons season 9 DVD release in the Daily Post noted that it includes "super illustrated colour commentaries" on "All Singing, All Dancing" and "Lost Our Lisa". Isaac Mitchell-Frey of the Herald Sun cited the episode as a "low moment" of the season, noting it "recycles parts of previous episodes".

Michael Dunne analyzed the episode in his book American Film Musical Themes and Forms, and gave examples from it while explaining that singing and dancing performances are generally not seen as acceptable in the television medium. He notes that Homer calls singing "fruity" and "the lowest form of communication" during the episode. However, Dunne also notes the fact that Homer himself sings "his objection that musicals are fake and phony". Dunne describes the frame narrative as establishing Marge as "more favorably disposed toward musicals than the males in her house". Dunne concluded that "musicals come out on top in this episode, but the victory is marginal at best". Of the episode itself, Dunne wrote that "the parodies contained in the show demonstrate that its creators are familiar enough with various forms of musical performance to echo them and confident enough that their viewers will catch the references".
