= The Joy of Sect =

- The Simpsons episode
- Various residents of Springfield being forced by the Movementarians into growing and harvesting lima beans.
- Episode no.: Season 9 Episode 13
- Directed by: Steven Dean Moore
- Written by: Steve O'Donnell
- Production code: 5F23
- Original air date: February 8, 1998

Episode features
- Chalkboard gag: "Shooting paintballs is not an art form"
- Couch gag: Tiny versions of the Simpsons climb on the couch, and a normal-sized Santa's Little Helper comes up to the couch, takes Homer in his mouth, and eats him.
- Commentary: Matt Groening; David Mirkin; Steve O'Donnell; Yeardley Smith; Steven Dean Moore

Episode chronology
← Previous "Bart Carny"	Next → "Das Bus"
- The Simpsons season 9

"The Joy of Sect" is the thirteenth episode of the ninth season of the American animated television series The Simpsons. It originally aired on Fox in the United States on February 8, 1998. In the episode, the Movementarian cult takes over Springfield, and the Simpson family (with the exception of Marge) become members.

David Mirkin conceived the episode, Steve O'Donnell was the lead writer and Steven Dean Moore directed. The writers drew on many groups to develop the Movementarians, but were principally influenced by L. Ron Hubbard's Scientology, Heaven's Gate, the Unification Church ("Moonies"), the Rajneesh movement and Peoples Temple. Pop culture allusions include the title reference to The Joy of Sex and a gag involving Rover from The Prisoner. The episode was analyzed from religious, philosophical and psychological perspectives; books on The Simpsons compared the Movementarians to many of the same groups from which the writers had drawn influence. USA Today and The A.V. Club featured "The Joy of Sect" in lists of important episodes of The Simpsons.

== Plot ==
At the airport, Bart and Homer meet recruiters for the Movementarians, a new religious movement, who invite Homer and many other Springfieldians to a free weekend at their compound. There, an orientation film says that "The Leader" will guide Movementarians aboard a spaceship to the planet Blisstonia. Audience members who try to leave are pressured to stay by having a spotlight shone on them. The film brainwashes the attendees into worshipping The Leader, except for Homer, who was not paying attention. Having failed to brainwash Homer through humiliation and nutrient deficiency (via low protein gruel), the recruiters succeed with a chant to the tune of the Batman theme song.

Almost all Springfieldians join the Movementarians, including Homer, who moves his family to their compound. Meanwhile, Mr. Burns makes an unsuccessful attempt to start a cult of his own in order to achieve tax-exempt status, and Kent Brockman's exposé pieces on the Movementarians are suppressed after the Leader becomes the owner of Channel 6's parent company. Though defiant at first, the Simpson children are converted to Movementarianism. Marge is the only family member to resist, and escapes from the heavily guarded compound. Outside, she finds Reverend Lovejoy, Ned Flanders and Groundskeeper Willie, who have all resisted the Movementarians, and with their help, she tricks her family into leaving the compound with her.

At the Flanders' home, Marge deprograms her kids by baiting them with fake hoverbikes while Ned and Lovejoy work on Homer with a glass of beer. However, as a drop of beer lands on his tongue, he is recaptured by the Movementarians' lawyers. Back at the compound, Homer reveals to the other Movementarians that he is no longer brainwashed and attempts to expose the cult, but upon opening the doors of the compound's "Forbidden Barn" he and the crowd are surprised to find an actual spaceship. However, the crude spaceship disintegrates as it takes flight, revealing The Leader on a pedal-powered aircraft fleeing with everyone's money. He subsequently crashes on the property of Cletus Spuckler, who forces him to give over the money at gunpoint.

The Simpsons return home, where Lisa remarks how wonderful it is to once again be able to think for themselves. The episode ends with the family watching TV and monotonously repeating the words of a Fox announcer: "we are watching Fox".

== Production ==
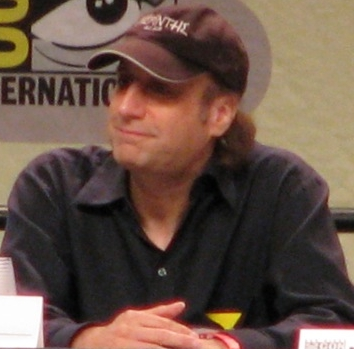
David Mirkin, executive producer of "The Joy of Sect", pitched the episode's plot.

"The Joy of Sect" was based on an idea from David Mirkin and was the last episode written by Steve O'Donnell. Mirkin had been the show runner during seasons five and six but had been brought back to produce two episodes during the ninth season. He said he was attracted to parodying cults because they are "comical, interesting and twisted". He conceived the episode after hearing a radio show about the history of cults whilst driving home one night. Mirkin and O'Donnell were the episode's main writers. It was directed by Steven Dean Moore.

Aspects of the Movementarians were inspired by real cults and new religious movements, including L. Ron Hubbard's Scientology, Jim Jones's Peoples Temple, Heaven's Gate, the Unification Church ("Moonies"), the Oneida Society and Bhagwan Shree Rajneesh. Specifically, the leader driving through the fields in a Rolls-Royce was partly inspired by the Bhagwans, and the notion of holding people inside the camp against their will was a reference to Jones. The scene during orientation video where those who get up to leave are induced to stay through peer pressure and groupthink was a reference to the Unification Church and EST Training. The episode was written in 1997, at roughly the same time that the members of Heaven's Gate committed mass suicide. The writers noticed strange parallels between Mirkin's first draft and Heaven's Gate, including the belief in the arrival of a spaceship and the group's members wearing matching clothes and odd sneakers. Because of these coincidences, several elements of the episode were changed so that it would be more sensitive in the wake of the suicides. The name "Movementarians" was simply chosen for its awkward sound. The show's producers acknowledged that the ending of the episode was a poke at Fox as "being the evil mind controlling network".

== Themes ==
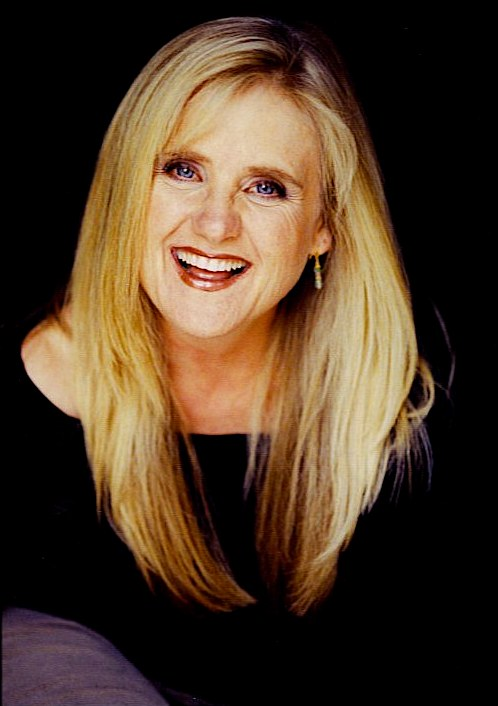
Nancy Cartwright, the voice of Bart, is a Scientologist.

Chris Turner's book Planet Simpson describes the Movementarians as a cross between Scientology and Raëlism, with lesser influences from Sun Myung Moon and Bhagwan Shree Rajneesh. Turner also notes the Simpsons' chant at the conclusion of the episode as evidence of a "true high-growth quasi-religious cult of our time", television. Turner refers to a "Cult of Pop", "a fast growing mutation ersatz religion that has filled the gaping hole in the West's social fabric where organized religion used to be". Martin Hunt of FACTnet notes several similarities between the Movementarians and Scientology: "The Leader" physically resembles L. Ron Hubbard; the Movementarians' use of a trillion-year commitment for its members alludes to the Sea Org's billion-year contract; and both groups make extensive use of litigation. The A.V. Club compared the Movementarians' plans to travel to "Blisstonia" to Heaven's Gate's promises of bliss after traveling to the comet Hale–Bopp. However, it also notes that the episode is a commentary on organized religion in general, quoting Bart as saying, "Church, cult, cult, church. So we get bored someplace else every Sunday."

In The Simpsons and Philosophy, the authors cite "escaping from a cult commune in 'The Joy of Sect'" as evidence of "Aristotle's virtuous personality traits in Marge." The Psychology of the Simpsons examines "The Joy of Sect" discusses the psychology of decision-making, noting, "Homer is becoming a full-blown member of the Movementarians not by a rational choice... but through the process of escalating behavioral commitments." The authors explain the key recruitment techniques used by the Movementarians, including the charismatic leader, established authority based on a religious entity or alien being (in this case "Blisstonia"), and the method of taking away free choice through acceptance of the Leader's greatness. The book also analyzes the techniques used during the six-hour Movementarian recruitment film. In that scene, those who rise to leave are reminded that they are allowed to leave whenever they wish. They are, however, questioned in front of the group as to specifically why they wish to leave, and these individuals end up staying to finish watching the film. The book describes this technique as "subtle pressure", in contrast to the "razor wire, landmines, angry dogs, crocodiles and evil mystery bubble Marge confronts to escape, while being reminded again that she is certainly free to leave". The authors note that "the Leader" is seen as an authority figure, because "he has knowledge or abilities that others do not, but want". Instead of traditional textbooks, the children on the compound learn mathematics from Arithmetic the Leader's Way and Science for Leader Lovers.

In Mark I. Pinsky's The Gospel According to the Simpsons, one of the show's writers recounted that the producers of had vetoed a planned episode on Scientology in fear of the Church's "reputation for suing and harassing opponents". Pinsky notes that Groening later "took a shot at Scientology" in Futurama with the fictional religion "Church of Robotology". Groening said he received a call from the Church of Scientology concerned about the use of a similar name.

Alasdair Wilkins notes the Scientology references might have been lost in 1998: "In a world where South Park made 'Trapped In The Closet'. where Paul Thomas Anderson got The Master made, and where Going Clear is only one of a seemingly endless succession of Scientology exposés, it’s easy to take for granted that the once closely guarded secrets of the group are now common knowledge. ... This is one seriously fearless episode."

== Cultural references ==
The title is a reference to The Joy of Sex. Neal Hefti's Batman theme song is sung by Homer, and later used to brainwash him. When Mr. Burns introduces his new religion, most of the sequence is a parody of the promotional video of Michael Jackson's HIStory: Past, Present and Future, Book I (1995). When Marge attempts to leave the compound, she is chased by the Rover guard "balloon" from The Prisoner (1967).

Willie scratching his nails along the church window to get Marge and Lovejoy's attention is a reference to Jaws (1975), where Quint performs a similar action at the town meeting. The Springfield Airport contains the "Just Crichton and King Bookstore", selling Michael Crichton and Stephen King.

== Reception ==
In its original broadcast, "The Joy of Sect" finished 27th in ratings for the week of February 2–8, 1998, with a Nielsen rating of 9.6, equivalent to approximately 9.4 million viewing households. It was the fourth highest-rated show on the Fox network that week, following The X-Files, King of the Hill and Ally McBeal.

The Sunday Mail highlighted the episode for their "Family Choice" segment, commenting: "Normally, a show about religious cults would spell doom and gloom. Only Bart, of The Simpsons, could make a comedy out of it but then, he and his cartoon family are a cult in their own right anyway!" Jeff Shalda of The Simpsons Archive used the episode as an example of one of the "good qualities present in The Simpsons", while analyzing why some other aspects of The Simpsons upset Christians.

USA Today highlighted "The Joy of Sect" as a standout of The Simpsons season 9, along with "Trash of the Titans", "The Last Temptation of Krust", "The Cartridge Family", "Dumbbell Indemnity" and "Das Bus". The A.V. Club featured it in its list of "15 Simpsons Moments That Perfectly Captured Their Eras". The Daily Mirror gave the episode positive mention in its review of the Season 9 DVD release, calling it "hilarious". Isaac Mitchell-Frey of the Herald Sun cited the episode as the highlight of the season.

The authors of I Can't Believe It's a Bigger and Better Updated Unofficial Simpsons Guide commented that the episode was "an odd one" with "a lot of good moments", and went on to state that it was "a nice twist to see Burns determined to be loved".

Alasdair Wilkins praises the character development: "Marge is the character who understands herself best. Some of that probably has to do with her faith, which is particularly relevant here, but it's more universal than that. On a really basic level, Marge doesn't need external validation in the way the other Simpsons do, and that gives her the strength of character to escape the Movementarians, even when it involves evading a Prisoner-inspired gantlet."

In a lesson plan developed at St Mary's College, Durham titled An Introduction to Philosophy: The Wit and Wisdom of Lisa Simpson, the episode is described in a section on "False Prophets" as applicable for "...studying the more outrageous manifestations of 'religion' or those simply alert to the teachings of Christ on the subject".

== See also ==
- Parody religion
- Religion in The Simpsons
- Religious satire
- UFO religion
