= Steve O'Donnell (writer) =

Television writer

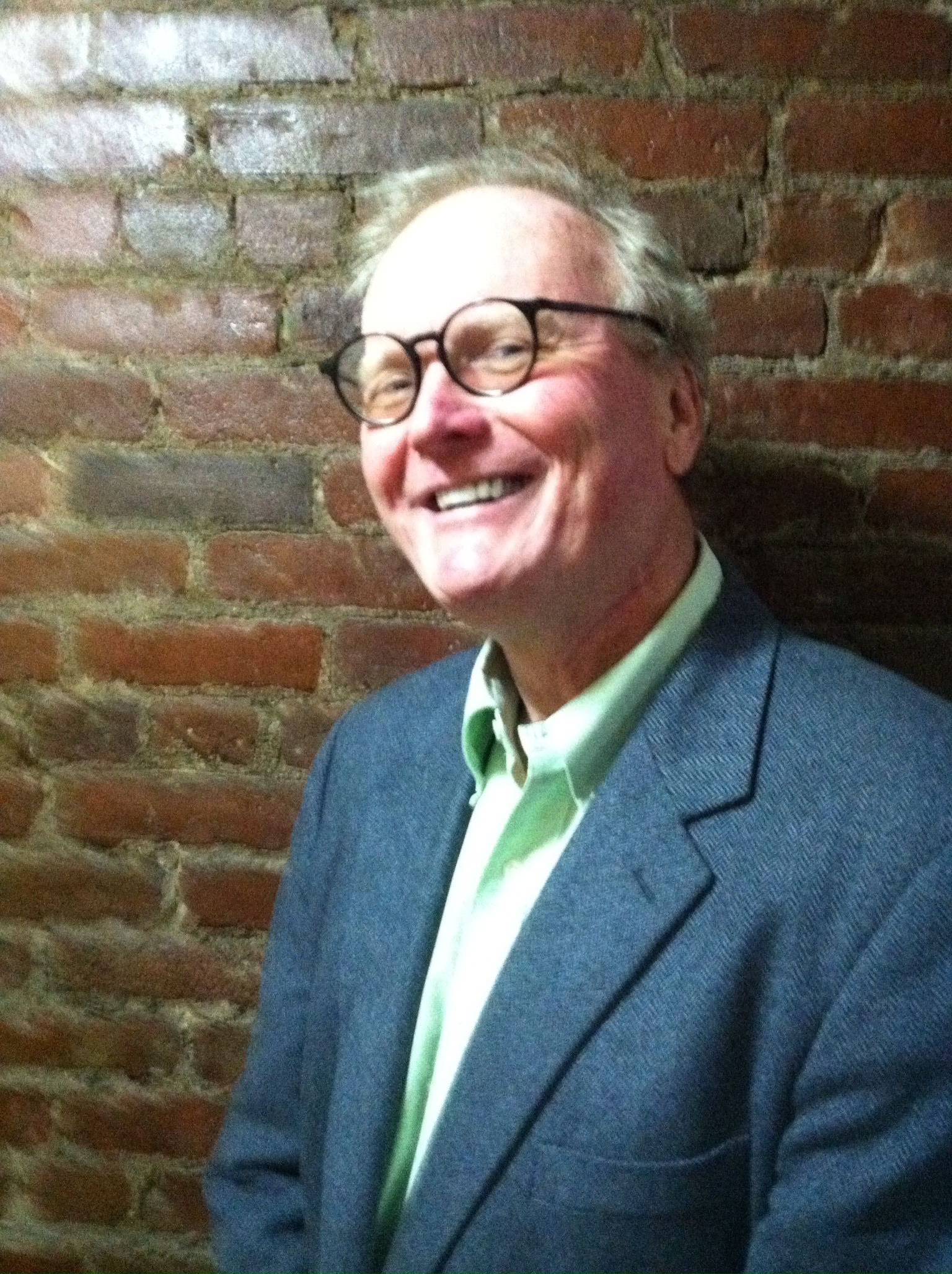
- O'Donnell in 2015
- Education: Harvard University
- Occupation: Writer
- Known for: Late Night with David Letterman, Jimmy Kimmel Live!, The Chris Rock Show, The Bonnie Hunt Show, The Simpsons, Seinfeld
- Relatives: Mark O'Donnell (twin brother)

Steve O'Donnell is an American television writer. His credits include Late Night with David Letterman, The Simpsons, Seinfeld, and The Chris Rock Show.

== Biography ==
Steve O'Donnell was born in Cleveland, Ohio, and graduated with an A.B. degree from Harvard College in 1976. He also completed graduate studies in American history at Columbia University and the University of North Carolina at Chapel Hill.

== Career ==
O'Donnell worked on Letterman nearly since the show's inception. The Top Ten List was originally created during O'Donnell's time as head writer, and lists were written in collaboration with other staff writers on the show. According to O'Donnell, the Top Ten List was an "almost simultaneous inspiration arriving from staffers Jim Downey, Randy Cohen and Robert "Morty" Morton — largely prompted by the ridiculous 'eligible bachelor' lists in a local New York paper that included the 78-year-old Bill Paley. 'Why, we can put such nonsense together ourselves!' we exclaimed. And we did." He later co-authored several of the Top-ten books based on the show. He was seen occasionally on Late Night in comedic sketches, perhaps most notably in the recurring "plays" put on by the Peace Through Dramatization Players. During Letterman's final season, O'Donnell wrote and spoke about his time as head writer on the show, and compiled his own list of the show's "top ten" moments for The New York Times.

O'Donnell was later the head writer of Jimmy Kimmel Live!, from the show's debut in January 2003 until 2008. He occasionally appeared front of the camera in bits for the show as well.

In addition to his tenure as head writer of Letterman and Kimmel, O'Donnell worked as a writer and producer on The Bonnie Hunt Show, The Dana Carvey Show, Norm Macdonald Live, and Why? with Hannibal Buress on Comedy Central. He continued his work with Norm Macdonald as a writer on Norm Macdonald Has a Show for Netflix.

He has appeared in additional brief on-screen roles in Strangers With Candy and The Sarah Silverman Program.

He won Primetime Emmy Awards in the "Outstanding Writing in a Variety or Music Program" category on four occasions: for Late Night with David Letterman in 1984, 1986, and 1987 and for The Chris Rock Show in 1998.

In 2017, the Writers Guild of America presented O'Donnell with the Herb Sargent Award for Comedy Excellence. A video appearance from recently retired David Letterman was part of O'Donnell's introduction.

== Personal life ==
Steve is the identical twin of Mark O'Donnell, the Tony Award-winning co-writer of the Broadway musical Hairspray who died on August 6, 2012. Steve supported his brother by encouraging California voters to vote no on Prop. 8 in 2008.

== Simpsons Episodes Written by O'Donnell ==
- All Singing, All Dancing
- The Joy of Sect

== Seinfeld Episodes Written by O'Donnell ==
- The Pothole
- The Checks

== Space Ghost: Coast to Coast Episodes Written by O'Donnell ==
- Hungry
- Late Show
