= Justin Stangel =

Justin Stangel is a radio and television showrunner, writer and producer. In 1998, Stangel and his brother Eric Stangel become the head writers of Late Show with David Letterman, positions they held until 2013.

== Biography ==
Stangel and his brother Eric Stangel created a stage show in Manhattan, titled Big City Comedy. The success of the show led to writing work for Norm Macdonald's Weekend Update on Saturday Night Live, the cartoon show The Tick on Fox Television, and the USA Network. The comedy shorts they created to air between shows for the USA Network helped land the Stangel brothers staff writing jobs with Late Show with David Letterman, in 1997.

In 1998, Stangel and his brother become the head writers of the Late Show, positions they held until 2013. As co-head writer for The Late Show, Stangel was part of a team that has won two Primetime Emmy Awards (in 2001 and 2002), received twenty-one total Emmy nominations, and was nominated for Writers Guild of America awards four times. In December 2009 Stangel and his brother Eric were promoted to executive producers for The Late Show. The Stangel brothers are the longest-serving head writers in the history of Letterman's late night shows.

Eric and Justin in 2012 published their first book Goodnight Husband, Goodnight Wife which won an Independent Publishing Award in the category of Humor.

In 2012 he wrote additional material for the 84th Academy Awards hosted by Billy Crystal which was nominated for an Emmy Award for outstanding Writing for a Variety Special.

In 2015, Justin and Eric Stangel were added to the staff of Opie with Jim Norton on SiriusXM. On March 15, 2016, Opie announced that the Stangel Brothers officially left their role with the show to be executive producers on the daytime television show Harry starring Harry Connick Jr. In two seasons, Harry was honored with 11 Daytime Emmy nominations (2 wins) and a Critics Choice Award nomination.

In 2020, Justin and Eric signed one-day contracts with baseball teams starting with the Portland Pickles, Cleburne Railroaders, and the Lake Erie Crushers.

In February 2021 the Stangels signed with the AAA ballclub for Major League Baseball's Minnesota Twins, the St. Paul Saints,

Then in May 2021, Eric and Justin signed with the Cleveland Indians AA club, the Akron RubberDucks, and were promised items from the extreme menu including a 21 scoop ice cream sundae served in a full-size helmet if they show up to the ballpark.

Following this signing, they appeared on ESPN+'s SportsNation to detail their story and announce the 6th team they will be signing with, the Carolina Disco Turkeys.

In June 2021, they officially signed with the Disco Turkeys

On August 17, 2021, the Stangels announced they signed with the New York Yankees High-A club, the Hudson Valley Renegades, and were offered the chance to throw out the first pitch at an upcoming game.

April 2, 2022, Eric and Justin signed with the Kingsport Axmen of the Appalachian League. Logan Davis, the team General Manager signed the brothers to the back end of the bullpen.

The brothers signed with team number 9 on May 18, 2022, with the Spearfish Sasquatch of Independence League Baseball. Team Owner and General Manager Eric Schmidt also offered Eric and Justin the opportunity to model merchandise on the team website.

On May 26, 2022, Eric and Justin hit double digits, signing with their 10th team, the Norwich Sea Unicorns of the Futures Collegiate Baseball League. Team General Manager Lee Walter Jr. gave them a contract allowing the brothers to make announcements over the Dodd Stadium PA system during a game.

In February 2023, the brothers signed with team number 11, the Springfield Lucky Horseshoes of the Prospect League. Team “Emperor of Engagement” Andrew Miller signed them over Zoom and offered them a chance to face 90 per hour pitching.

In January 2024, the High-A affiliate of the Miami Marlins, the Beloit Sky Carp of the Midwest League gave Eric and Justin their 12th one-day contract.

History may have been made in March 2024, when the AAA affiliate of baseball’s Detroit Tigers, the Toledo Mud Hens and the affiliate of hockey’s Detroit Red Wings, the Toledo Walleye signed the brothers to one-day deals.
