= George Yanok =

American screenwriter, television producer, actor, and drummer (1938–2022)

- Born: November 29, 1938; Bristol, Connecticut, U.S.
- Died: April 29, 2022 (aged 83); Nashville, Tennessee, U.S.
- Occupations: Screenwriter; television producer; actor; jazz drummer

George Richard Yanok (November 29, 1938 – April 29, 2022) was an American screenwriter, television producer, actor, and jazz drummer. He is noted for winning Primetime Emmy Awards in 1974 and 1976.

== Early life ==
Yanok was born in Bristol, Connecticut, on November 29, 1938. His family moved to Pomona, California, when he was around twelve. He attended Pomona Catholic High School, where he was classmates with John Stewart. Yanok then studied at Santa Clara University and San Jose State College before joining the US Army.

== Career ==
Yanok first worked in stand-up comedy at the hungry i in San Francisco and was an actor in theatre. He also toured with Stewart and The Kingston Trio, becoming their final road manager and the editor of Once Upon a Time, the group's last album. Yanok eventually secured writing gigs with the shows The Glen Campbell Goodtime Hour and The Jimmie Rodgers Show in 1969, and was one of the inaugural writers of Hee Haw when it debuted that same year. He went on to produce The Kallikaks, which ran for five episodes as a mid-season replacement in August 1977. Yanok won two Primetime Emmy Awards for Outstanding Writing in a Comedy, Variety or Music and Outstanding Comedy Series in 1974 and 1976, in recognition of his work on Lily and Lily Tomlin. He also received two nominations, one of which was for Outstanding Comedy Series in 1976 for his work on Welcome Back, Kotter.

Yanok relocated from Los Angeles to Nashville, Tennessee, during the 1990s to serve as writer, producer, and director of Prime Time Country. During his time there, he was co-writer of the IMAX film Twang, researcher for Judge Judy, and teacher of television writing at Watkins College of Art and Screenwriters University. He was also involved with the Nashville Jazz Workshop as a drummer for its classic jazz ensembles and vocal classes during the organization's nascent years. Yanok later published his first novel in 2017, titled Romeo in Shubert Alley.

== Personal life ==
Yanok was married to Suzanne Helms during his years in Los Angeles. He later married Laura Hill, a Nashville newspaper reporter and columnist, and remained married to her for twenty years until his death. He had two stepchildren from his marriage to Hill: John and Katie.

Yanok died on April 29, 2022, in Nashville. He was 83 and suffered from lung cancer in the 18 months leading up to his death.
