= Rob Kutner =

American comedy writer

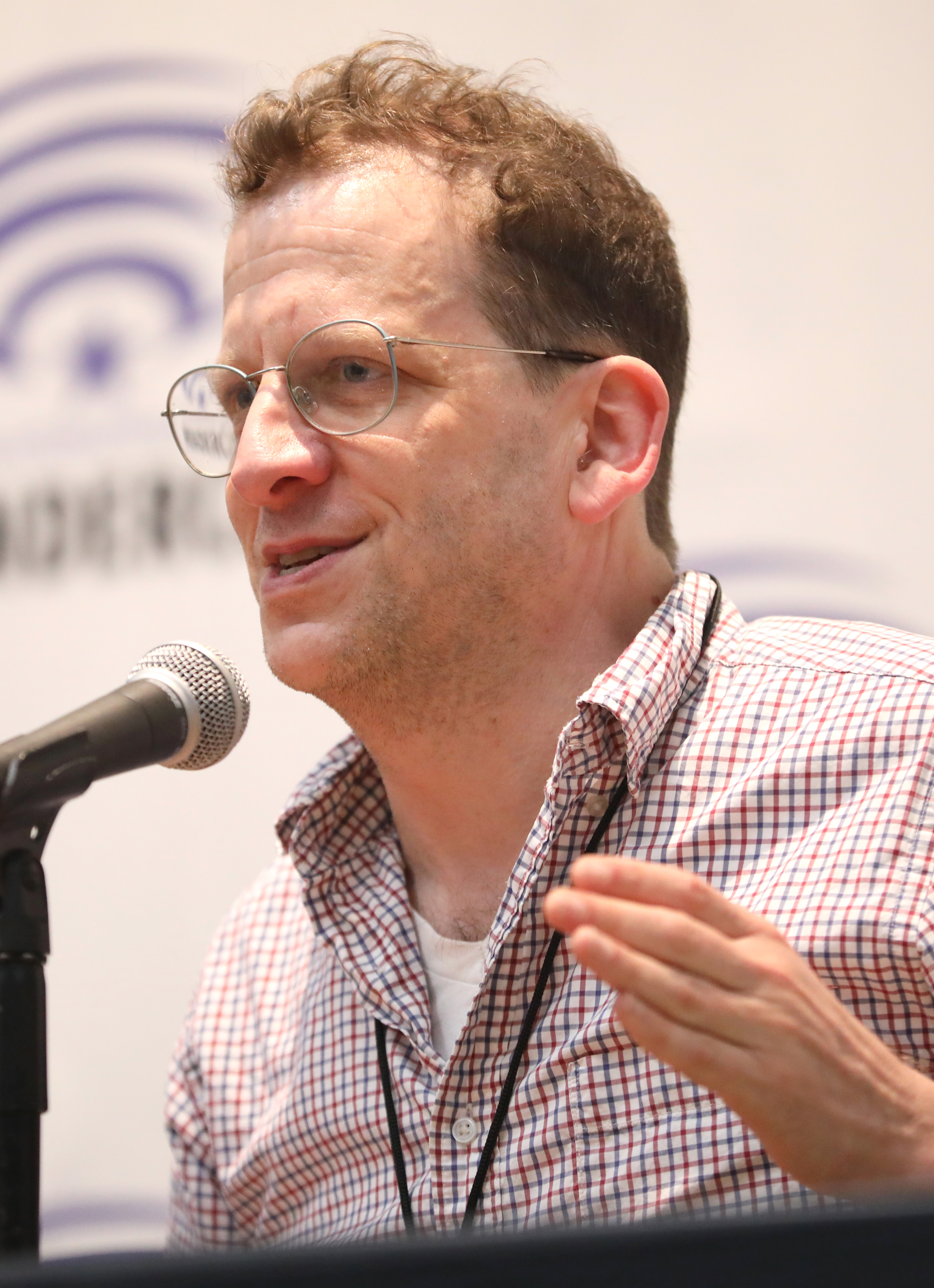
- Kutner at the 2024 WonderCon
- Born: Atlanta, Georgia, United States
- Education: Princeton University
- Notable work: Dennis Miller Live (writer); The Daily Show (writer); The Tonight Show with Conan O'Brien (writer); Conan (writer)
- Spouse: Sheryl Zohn

Comedy career
- Medium: Television
- Website: www.robkutner.com

Rob Kutner is an American comedy writer-producer.

== Career ==
As a writer for Dennis Miller Live, he was nominated for a 2003 Writers' Guild of America Award. After Dennis Miller Live left the air, Kutner went on to write for The Daily Show, where he has won five Emmies to date. Additionally, he has won a Peabody Award and an award from the Television Critics' Association, and a Grammy for contributing to the bestselling book/audiobook America (The Book). He was a writer for The Tonight Show with Conan O'Brien until January 22, 2010 and has stayed on Conan O'Brien's writing staff for the TBS television program, Conan. Since then, he has written for animated shows including Teen Titans Go!, Ben 10, and Angry Birds: Summer Madness, and developed animated shows for the Syfy network and Warner Brothers Animation. He also co-created the topical sketch comedy show Gander, and is currently Head Writer of God's Gang, an independently produced action-comedy animated series featuring a team of interfaith heroes, that has garnered over 2 million subscribers online.

In 2003, Kutner wrote the short film Pie Chi, which has been seen at numerous festivals and was broadcast on Showtime Television. His humor pieces have appeared in The New York Times, Esquire, Los Angeles Times, Maxim, and The Huffington Post. In 2016, he created the scripted podcast miniseries Runaway Brains, starring "Weird Al" Yankovic and Ken Jennings.

His book Apocalypse How (Running Press/Perseus), a humorous guide on how to "make the end times the best of times," was released in May 2008 and was a national bestseller. His Kindle Single, "The Future According to Me," was released in July 2011. "The Future According to Me" was released as an Audible audiobook in June 2015, featuring voice performances by Emo Phillips, Kurt Andersen, Cecil Baldwin, and Eddie Pepitone. Kutner was also a co-creator of the comedy-music album "2776", which features numerous celebrities and benefits the charity OneKid OneWorld.

He is the creator of the sci-fi comedy comic book "Shrinkage" for Farrago Comics.

In 2024, Kutner came out with Snot Goblins & Other Tasteless Tales (First Second/MacMillan), a middle-grade "horror-comedy grossout" graphic novel anthology, illustrated by Mad artist David DeGrand, with positive testimonials by R. L. Stine and Felicia Day. He also ghostwrote Look Out for the Little Guy, (Disney Hyperion) the fictional memoir of Scott Lang, aka "Ant-Man" as depicted in the 2023 Marvel film Ant-Man and the Wasp: Quantumania. In the book's acknowledgments, "Lang" credits Kutner as his writing coach, which technically makes him part of the Marvel Cinematic Universe. He has also written another book for Marvel, "Deadpool's Affirmation's: Feel Yourself to Heal Yourself" which was published on October 28, 2025.

Kutner has shown an interest in melding the worlds of neurodivergence and entertainment. He co-produced Let it Out, the first-ever standup comedy show tailored for a neurodivergent audience, and headlined by Kevin Nealon at Los Angeles' Laugh Factory. He hosted a podcast called "Genius Revisited" produced by Jett Road Studios, where Kutner and guests explored whether filmmaker Stanley Kubrick might have been considered neurodivergent.

His book, The Jews: 5,000 Years and Counting (Point Hill Press/Simon & Schuster) released on March 11, 2025. The book is a comedic survey of all of Jewish history, "from Adam & Eve to Zabar's".

== Personal life ==
Kutner was born to a Jewish family and raised in Atlanta, Georgia, where he attended The Westminster Schools. Comic actors Ed Helms and Brian Baumgartner attended Westminster at the same time. He studied at Princeton University, achieving an AB in anthropology in 1994. At Princeton he was the editor of the school's humor magazine, The Tiger and was a member of the improv comedy troupe "Quipfire". He was also a member and the announcer for the Princeton University Band.

He currently resides in Los Angeles with his wife, writer Sheryl Zohn. He is an observant Jew.
