= Herb Sargent =

American screenwriter (1923–2005)

- Born: Herbert Supowitz; July 15, 1923; Philadelphia, Pennsylvania, U.S.
- Died: May 6, 2005 (aged 81); New York City, New York, U.S.
- Education: UCLA
- Occupation: Television writer and producer, screenwriter
- Spouses: Zalotta Rosenberg (m. 1946; ann. 1947) Geraldine Brooks (m. 1958; div. 1961) Norma Crane (m. 1961, divorced) Katherine LeGrand Council Mellon (m. 1991)
- Relatives: Alvin Sargent (brother)
- Military career
- Allegiance: United States
- Branch: U.S. Army Air Forces
- Unit: Air Transport Command
- Conflict: World War II Pacific Theater

Herbert Sargent (born Supowitz; July 15, 1923 – May 6, 2005) was an American television writer, a producer for such comedy shows as The Tonight Show and Saturday Night Live, and a screenwriter (Bye Bye Braverman). During his tenure at Saturday Night Live, he and Chevy Chase created Weekend Update, the longest-running sketch in the show's history, and one of the longest-running sketches on television.

== Biography ==
He was born Herbert Supowitz in Philadelphia on July 15, 1923. He was the older brother of Academy Award-winning screenwriter Alvin Sargent. Raised in Upper Darby Township, Pennsylvania, he studied architecture at Penn State University before serving with the United States Army Air Forces Air Transport Command in the Pacific Theater during World War II. He moved to Los Angeles and graduated from UCLA.

Sargent then moved to New York City and began his career in radio. Moving to television, he was one of the writers for the much-acclaimed Steve Allen Show (on NBC from 1956 to 1960). He later helped develop television specials for Petula Clark, Perry Como, Bing Crosby, Alan King, Milton Berle, Sammy Davis Jr., Lily Tomlin, Paul McCartney, Anne Bancroft, and Burt Bacharach. In 1975, Sargent was hired as one of original writers on Saturday Night Live, co-created Weekend Update with Chevy Chase and Al Franken, and was the one who coined the term "The Not Ready for Prime Time Players" (the Cast's title for the first 3 seasons).

Sargent was married four times.

His first marriage was in late 1946 or early 1947 to Zalotta Rosenberg. The marriage was annulled in October 1947.

His second marriage was in 1958 to Geraldine Brooks; the couple divorced in 1961.

Later that year he married actress Norma Crane, but they had divorced by the time she died in 1973.

His last marriage was to Katherine LeGrand Council Mellon in 1991; they remained together until his death in 2005.

Sargent won six Emmy Awards and six Writers Guild of America Awards. He was also President of the Writers Guild of America, East.

He died from a heart attack following surgery on May 6, 2005, in Manhattan, New York City.
