= Jim Rusk =

American screenwriter

Jim Rusk (c. 1939 – July 28, 1996) was an American screenwriter. He worked as a screenwriter for television specials and movies, as his credits includes, The Nut House!!, The Lily Tomlin Show, Lily and The Lily Tomlin Special. He was from Kansas City, Missouri.

Rusk won two Primetime Emmys and three nominations for Outstanding Writing in a Comedy, Variety or Music from 1973 to 1976.

Rusk died in Tulsa, Oklahoma on July 28, 1996, at the age of 57.

== Filmography ==
- The Lily Tomlin Special (TV movie)1975
- Lily (TV movie) 1973
- The Nut House!! (TV movie) 1964
