= Karyl Geld Miller =

American screenwriter

Karyl Geld Miller is an American Emmy Award-winning screenwriter and political cartoonist and commentator. Her Emmy was for Best Writing for the TV special Lily, starring Lily Tomlin and featuring Richard Pryor (1974). That script and the script for the previous years' Tomlin special were both nominated for the Best Written Variety Script award by the Writers Guild of America. "Lily" also won the Best Writing award from The American Academy of Humor, and Rolling Stone Magazine gave the show its TV Show of the Year award. Miller's sitcom writing and producing credits are extensive. See MillerReport.com

Miller's political cartoons, under the headings "Beyond the Palin," and "American 'Toon," have appeared in the Writers Guild's On the Line newspaper and Written By magazine, Direct eZine for Democrats, San Diego City Beat and her own web site, The Miller Report. Her comic strip "Plan B" is published online at GoComics.

Since 2011, Miller has been president of the Southern California Cartoonists Society, the San Diego Chapter of the National Cartoonists Society.

As a TV writer, Miller's credits include The Cosby Show, My Sister Sam (for which she was also supervising producer), and, as Karyl Geld, The Mary Tyler Moore Show, Maude, Erma Bombeck's Maggie, Kate and Allie, Love, Sidney starring Tony Randall, Diff'rent Strokes, Barney Miller, The Bob Newhart Show, Cher, and many more. She collaborated with Richard Pryor on an episode of Sanford and Son.

In 2002 Miller wrote and executive produced the musical sitcom pilot "Life of Riley," starring Mickey Gilley, Mel Tillis, Irlene Mandrell, and newcomer Joey Riley. She has also written pilots for Norman Lear/CBS ("Millionaires!"), Showtime ("Sherman Oaks"), and Vin Di Bona Productions/MTV ("There It Is"). She also worked on animated pilots including Universal Family's "Go Grrl" and "The New Woody Woodpecker Show," and for Warner Brothers' Waynehead, which starred Damon Wayans.

Miller has been a keynote speaker at Erma Bombeck Writer's Conference and other venues. Her editorials and blogs have appeared in Daily Variety and in various newspapers and web sites.
