= Mitzi...Roarin' in the 20's =

1976 television special starring Mitzi Gaynor

Mitzi...Roarin' in the 20s is a 1976 Emmy Award winning television special starring Mitzi Gaynor.

== Overview ==
The variety show included music and comedy and guest starred Carl Reiner, Linda Hopkins and Ken Berry. It was produced by Jack Bean, Tom Biener and Harry Waterson; and directed by Brian Bartholomew and Keaton S. Walker.

== Awards ==
Costume designer Bob Mackie won an Emmy for "Outstanding Achievement in Costume Design for Music-Variety". John Freschi won an Emmy for "Outstanding Achievement in Lighting Direction".
