= Ann Elder =

American actress, producer, and screenwriter (born 1942)

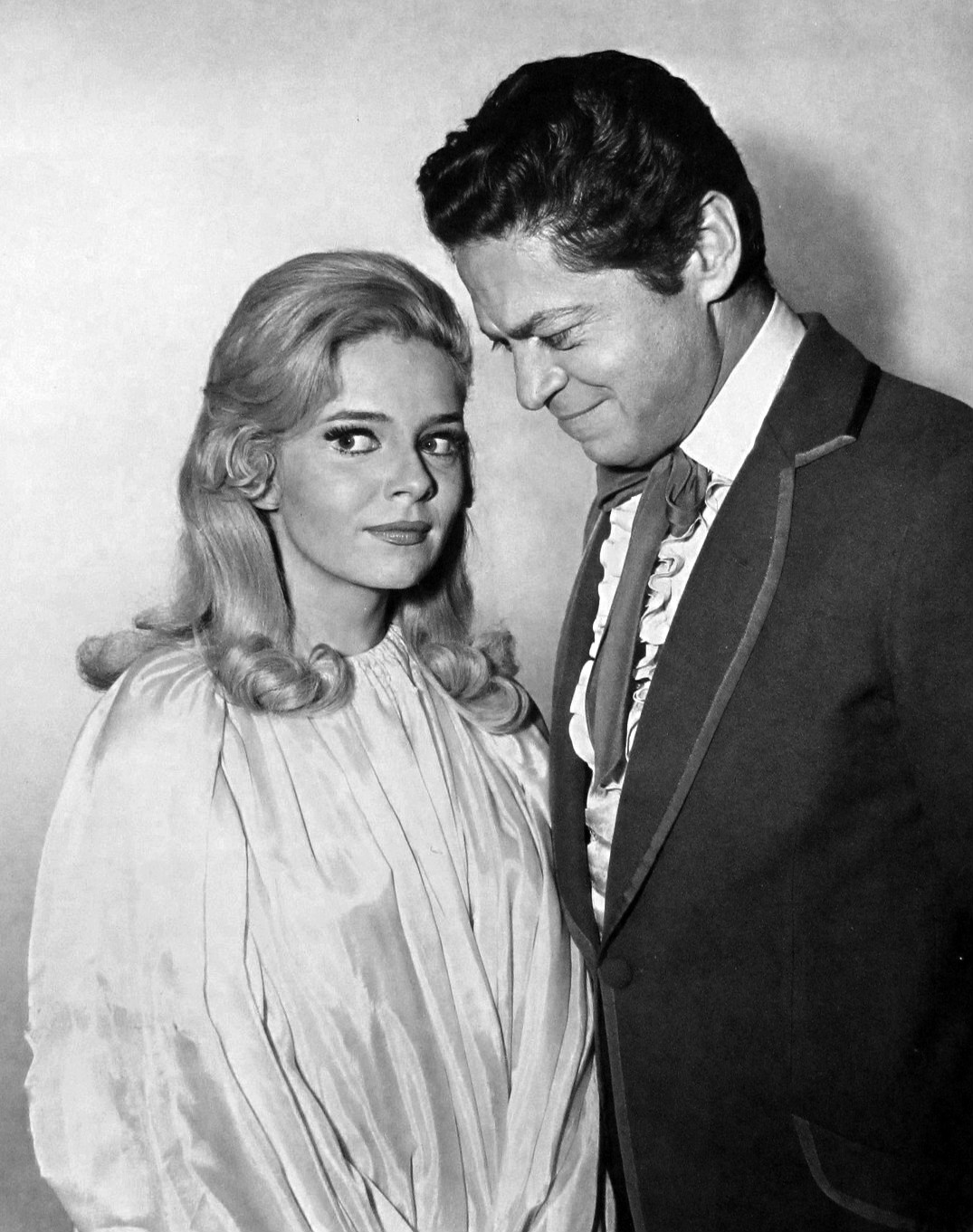
- Elder with Ross Martin in an episode of The Wild Wild West
- Born: Anna Velders; September 21, 1942 (age 82); Cleveland, Ohio, U.S.
- Occupation(s): Screenwriter, producer, actress
- Years active: 1965–1980

Ann Elder (born Anna Velders; September 21, 1942, Cleveland, Ohio) is an American actress, producer and screenwriter.

== Career ==
Elder won Emmy Awards for comedy writing, including one for co-writing Lily Tomlin's 1974 CBS special. She co-wrote Mitzi Gaynor's 1960s NBC specials and wrote for the Vicki Lawrence comedy series Mama's Family. As an actress, Elder made guest appearances on several 1960s television series including The Farmer's Daughter, Death Valley Days, Ben Casey, The Wild Wild West, The Smothers Brothers Show, Get Smart, McHale's Navy and The Man from U.N.C.L.E.

In 1970, Elder became a regular cast member of NBC's Rowan and Martin's Laugh-In, remaining with the hit comedy hour for two seasons. She was also seen twice on the ABC comedy anthology Love, American Style, and in an episode of The Odd Couple. Elder appeared occasionally on the CBS daytime game show Match Game during its 1970s run. Her film appearances include Don't Make Waves and For Singles Only. In 1973, Elder contributed to an album on the Hidden Records label titled The Watergate Comedy Hour, which also featured Jack Burns, Avery Schreiber, and Fannie Flagg.

In 1980, HBO hired her as the producer of their first independent production, a satirical election special called A Funny Thing Happened on the Way to the White House, hosted by Steve Allen and with Paul Krassner as head writer.
