= Rod Warren =

American screenwriter

Rod Warren (real name Rodney Warnken) (1931 – 22 October 1984) was an American screenwriter, producer, and actor.

He was the youngest of three children of Belle and Robert Warnken Sr. of New Jersey. He had one surviving sister, Martha Butler of Wallkill, New York, who died in December 2020, and a brother, Robert Warnken Jr. of Millport, NY, who died in 1994. He was well known for his car and phonograph collections. His car collection was frequently loaned to major Hollywood studios. His phonographs and scripts are on display in a special room of the Hollywood library.

Warren won two Primetime Emmy Awards as part of the writing teams for programs featuring Lily Tomlin. He also wrote for other variety shows such as Donny and Marie, Star Wars Holiday Special and The Smothers Brothers Show. He produced and supervised the writing of a 1978 television special produced for the Church of Jesus Christ of Latter-day Saints entitled The Family . . . and other living things.

Warren was one of the clients of entertainment manager Harvey Glass, who embezzled large sums from Warren (and other clients) and was later sentenced to prison. Warren died of a heart attack in October 1984 while in England filming a Perry Como Christmas special.
