= David Mirkin =

American film and television writer, director and producer

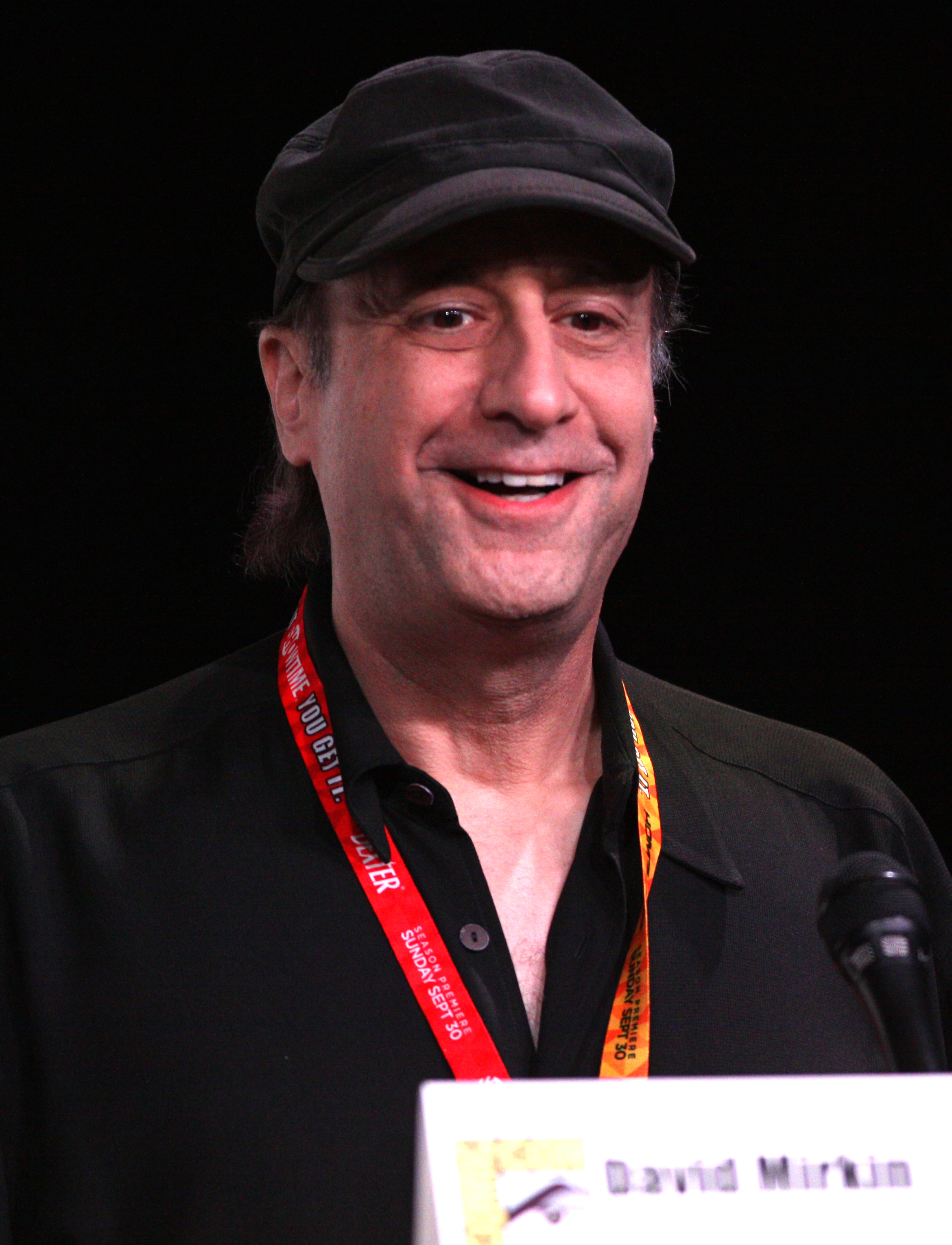
- Mirkin at the 2012 San Diego Comic-Con
- Born: 1956 or 1957 (age 68–69); Philadelphia, Pennsylvania, U.S.
- Occupations: Director, writer, producer, comedian
- Years active: 1982–present

David Mirkin (born 1956 or 1957) is an American feature film and television director, writer, and producer. Mirkin grew up in Philadelphia and intended to become an electrical engineer, but abandoned this career path in favor of studying film at Loyola Marymount University. After graduating, he became a stand-up comedian, and then moved into television writing. He wrote for the sitcoms Three's Company, It's Garry Shandling's Show and The Larry Sanders Show and served as showrunner for the series Newhart. After an unsuccessful attempt to remake the British series The Young Ones, Mirkin created Get a Life in 1990. The series starred comedian Chris Elliott and ran for two seasons, despite a lack of support from many Fox network executives, who disliked the show's dark and surreal humor. He moved on to create the sketch show The Edge starring his then-partner, actress Julie Brown.

Mirkin left The Edge during its run and became the executive producer and showrunner of The Simpsons for its fifth and sixth seasons. Mirkin has been cited as introducing a more surreal element to the show's humor, as shown by his first writing credit for the show, "Deep Space Homer", which sees Homer Simpson go to space as part of a NASA program to restore interest in space exploration. He won four Primetime Emmy Awards and a Peabody Award for his work on The Simpsons. Mirkin stood down as showrunner after season six, but produced several subsequent episodes, co-wrote The Simpsons Movie (2007) and from 2013 onwards has remained on the show as a consultant. Mirkin has also moved into feature film direction: he directed the films Romy and Michele's High School Reunion (1997) and Heartbreakers (2001).

== Early life ==
Mirkin was born and raised in Philadelphia, the son of Saul Mirkin (born Saul Capan) and Jennie Belkin. He graduated from Northeast High School in 1975. He is Jewish. His father was a computer engineer who was working at the Naval Aviation Supply Department at the time of his death from a heart attack in 1960, aged 49. Mirkin's older brother, Gary, worked as a television engineer for the Philadelphia NBC affiliate, KYW-TV, now a CBS owned-and-operated station. Throughout his childhood, Mirkin had an interest in film, and explored both writing and filming. Mirkin has described himself as a "nerd" and was often in trouble as a child because he was "in another world". At high school, he felt the teaching was "too slow" and was allowed by his teachers to "skip class two to three days a week".

Mirkin intended to pursue a career in electrical engineering, which he saw as a more stable employment opportunity than writing or film making. He took a course at Philadelphia's Drexel University which offered six months of teaching followed by a six-month internship at the National Aeronautics Federal Experimental Center. Mirkin found the experience to be monotonous and unenjoyable and chose to abandon this career path. He decided that "making no money doing something I loved was going to be better than making a good living doing something I didn't", so took "an enormous chance on show business" and moved to Los Angeles. He attended film school at Loyola Marymount University, and graduated in 1978.

Mirkin lists Woody Allen and James L. Brooks as his writing inspirations and Stanley Kubrick and the work of the comedy group Monty Python as developing his "dark sense of humor". He considers Mike Nichols's film The Graduate to be what inspired him to enter directing.

== Career ==
=== Early career on Three's Company and Newhart ===
Mirkin started out as a stand-up comedian in 1982 and performed across the United States, including at The Comedy Store, where he became a regular, and at The Improv. The first joke he used in his routine was, "Is it just me or has everybody been coughing up blood lately?" Mirkin considers the joke to be "an insight into the way [he writes]". Stand-up comedy was the most profitable and easily accessible route Mirkin found into the comedy industry, but "it wasn't a lifestyle that [he] particularly coveted," especially due to the traveling required.

He got his first job writing for television on the sitcom Three's Company in 1983. Through his cousin, Mirkin met writer George Tricker who became his mentor. Tricker wrote for the Three's Company spin-off The Ropers so Mirkin wrote a spec script for an episode of The Ropers. Although rejected by the producers of The Ropers, Three's Company creator Bernie West was impressed by the script and Mirkin began pitching ideas for that series instead. Mirkin pitched to the series' story editors for several years without success because they had very limited script buying power. He was eventually able to pitch to the show's producers, who bought a script from him, and then hired him as a staff writer. Mirkin was apprehensive about the job because he was aiming to work on Cheers, a show more focused on character-driven humor which Mirkin preferred writing, but felt he could not turn the opportunity down. Mirkin considered Three's Company to have "a classic French farce structure", as "the characters were so stupid they could never say anything clever." This meant Mirkin had to adapt his preference for character-driven comedy to fit the show; it "forced you to put all the cleverness into the plot, a much more difficult thing to do. The plot had to get all the laughs". Mirkin felt the experience "taught [him] a lot about structure" which greatly aided his later work on character-focused shows.

"I realized that I had kind of 'done' the multi-camera sitcom. I had done every aspect of the multi-camera sitcom and I was chafing at its limitations. I'd always been a big film freak, into cool camera movement, special effects and different styles of storytelling, different genres, so I very sadly came to the realization that I couldn't do a normal sitcom for the rest of my life where your characters simply congregate around an office desk or living room sofa. Here I had my dream, dream, dream dream job, which was kind of a Mary Tyler Moore Show with Bob Newhart, and I realized, to my horror, that I could only do that for four years."

— Mirkin on his decision to leave Newhart

Still hoping to work on Cheers, Mirkin sent a spec script of an episode of Taxi to Cheers writers Ken Levine and David Isaacs. The two approved and offered Mirkin a freelance job writing one of the final nine episodes of the show's first season, pending their commissioning by NBC. The episodes were commissioned, but Mirkin's agent rejected the Cheers job without telling his client, failing to see why Mirkin would want to work on what was then the lowest-rated comedy on television. Mirkin sacked the agent and signed on with Robb Rothman. Rothman knew Dan Wilcox, the executive producer of Newhart, which like Cheers was more character-focused. Rothman persuaded Wilcox to hire Mirkin. Mirkin wrote a freelance script and in 1984 beat seven other writers to a staff position on the series. He served as a writer and supervising story editor, before being promoted to executive producer and showrunner after one and a half years. Mirkin "felt [Newhart] was where I belonged. I'd finally come to a place in my life where everything I'd ever wanted had come together." In 1987, he received a Primetime Emmy Award nomination for Outstanding Writing for a Comedy Series for Newhart. It was the first nomination the show had received in that category and for the first episode Mirkin wrote as the series' showrunner. Mirkin directed several of the Newhart episodes he wrote because he saw directing as "a means of protecting the writing". A philosophy he carried into his later work, Mirkin felt that "being the head writer... was not enough; you had to see the material through its execution – especially the weirder stuff. You had to be right there to make sure every sick idea didn't lose any disturbing nuance." Mirkin left Newhart in 1988, desiring to work on a single-camera sitcom.

After leaving Newhart, Mirkin wrote freelance scripts for It's Garry Shandling's Show and The Tracey Ullman Show. Garry Shandling asked Mirkin to co-create The Larry Sanders Show with him. Mirkin did not have time, but worked as writer and consultant on the show's first season, and later returned to direct the 1998 final season episode "The Beginning of the End".

=== Get a Life and The Edge ===
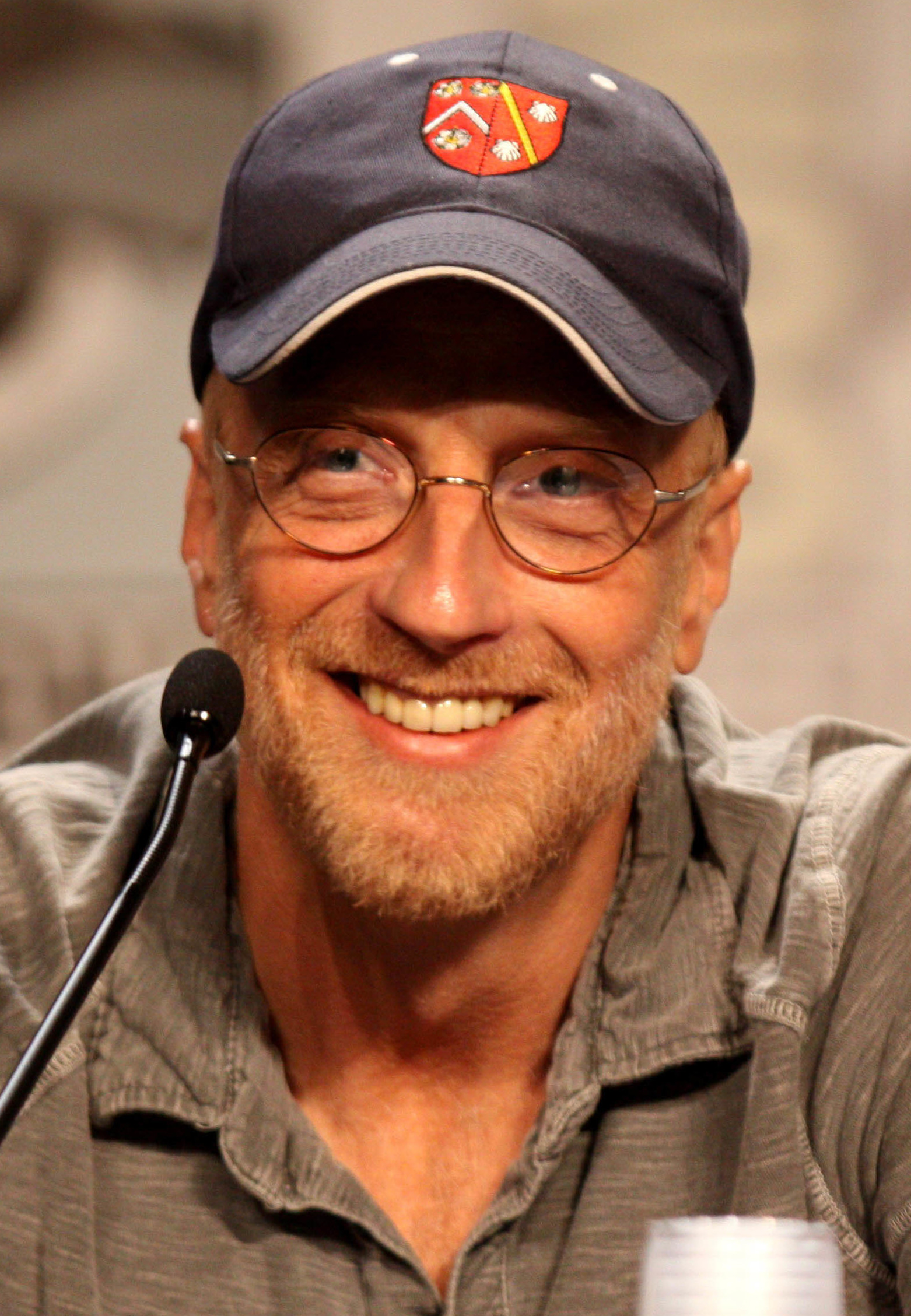
Mirkin created Get a Life alongside Chris Elliott, who was also the show's lead actor

Mirkin wanted to produce a surreal, Monty Python-esque, single-camera comedy series. He had a development deal with Newhart's producers MTM Enterprises and persuaded them to buy the rights to produce a pilot for an American adaptation of the British sitcom The Young Ones. The pilot was entitled Oh No, Not Them!, and featured Nigel Planer from the original series, as well as Jackie Earle Haley and Robert Bundy. Mirkin had wanted to cast comedian Chris Elliott in the pilot, but was prevented by Fox, which wanted Elliott for another show. Oh No, Not Them!, in Mirkin's words, "tested through the floor" because it was too "surreal" and "sarcastic" and was not picked up. Mirkin and Elliott decided to develop a show together, along with Adam Resnick. In 1990, they created the sitcom Get a Life, which was conceived as a dark, surreal, psychotic version of the cartoon Dennis the Menace. The show stars Elliott as Chris Peterson, a 30-year-old newspaper delivery boy who still lives with his parents, and who is increasingly losing his grip on reality. Fox was lukewarm about the idea, but Mirkin convinced them to order a pilot by understating how dark the show would be. The network executives disliked the pilot after seeing an initial run-through, but Mirkin felt that this was because they "didn't get" the show and opted not to change it. The executives enjoyed the finished pilot and it was aired. However, throughout the show's run, the network's initially negative attitude prevailed. According to Mirkin, many of the executives struggled to understand it and objected to the darkness and surrealism of the show's humor, which included the frequent death of Elliott's character, and regularly threatened to shut down production. After its first season, on the insistence of the network, Chris moves out of his parents' garage, attempts to get additional jobs to his paper route, and attempts to get a girlfriend. However, Mirkin and Elliott refused to "[compromise on] the essential goofiness of the show".

Mirkin served as executive producer for the series, directed most of the episodes, wrote several of them, and oversaw the filming and production of them all, to ensure that they had the correct "tone". The show's production process was lengthy; Mirkin would rise at 5 a.m. to film the show, write further episodes from 7 p.m. until 1 a.m., and then repeat that the following day. Unlike most single-camera shows, which have around six days to film, Mirkin had to film each episode in two days. He enjoyed doing it, but described it as "not a healthy way to live". Due to the logistics of filming the show, especially its many sets and effects, Mirkin convinced Fox to not film it in front of a studio audience and use a laugh track instead. The show achieved steady ratings in its first season, finishing 92nd out of the 129 shows listed in the Nielsen ratings. However, for its second season, it was moved from 8:30 p.m. on Sunday to 9:30 p.m. on Saturday and lost the bulk of its audience; it was canceled after that second season finished in 1992. In a 1999 piece about the show's DVD release, Tom Shales praised the show, concluding, "At its best, Get a Life achieved dizzying heights of surrealist farce. At its worst, it was at least amusingly idiotic existential slapstick. Get a Life is a television classic unlike any other. For one thing, most of the others are better. We're not talking Playhouse 90 here, after all. But we are talking riotous nonsense, and that's not to be sneezed at. It's to be laughed at. Hard." A strong cult following subsequently developed, and Mirkin noted that although the show was canceled "ultimately we got the audience I was hoping for and they are super dedicated and passionate to this day."

In 1991, Mirkin wrote a pilot with Julie Brown entitled The Julie Show, starring Brown, but NBC did not produce it. Several people at the network enjoyed it and commissioned The Edge, a sketch comedy show also written by Mirkin and Brown, with Mirkin directing. NBC opted against production, but Fox ran it from 1992 to 1993. Mirkin had long wished to produce a sketch show, and designed The Edge to be "fast-paced" and "some skits overlap, end abruptly or are broken into segments", in order to maintain attention. The Edge was a ratings success and was supported by the network. Mirkin considered it "the first time I experienced the feeling of having a hit that I created. It just kept building and growing." The show's material often inflamed its targets, particularly producer Aaron Spelling. Spelling objected to a sketch mocking his series Beverly Hills, 90210, another Fox show, and its lead actress Tori Spelling, who is his daughter. He demanded a public apology and that no further episodes contain the parody, threatening to sue. The show's production company TriStar Television refused, while Mirkin responded: "The thing about these parodies is they don't hurt a show. It's only cross-promotion. The viewers who like the show always come back the next week. What's upsetting to me is it shows absolutely that Mr. Spelling has no sense of humor." Mirkin left his role as executive producer of The Edge during its run. The Pittsburgh Post-Gazette reported that Mirkin had been "forced off the show", due to the negative reaction of Spelling and others, though in 2012, Mirkin stated that he left the series after refusing to accept a substantially reduced budget. The show's producers Sony failed to persuade him to stay but he returned to the series to produce its final "Best Of" compilation.

=== The Simpsons ===
Mirkin was the executive producer and showrunner for the animated sitcom The Simpsons, during its fifth and sixth seasons (1993–1995). Following the end of the show's fourth season, most of the original staff members left the show; only Bill Oakley, Josh Weinstein, Conan O'Brien and Dan McGrath remained, and O'Brien soon left to replace David Letterman as host of Late Night. Executive producers James L. Brooks and Richard Sakai hired Mirkin following his exit from The Edge. He had been asked to join the show's writing team when it started in 1989, but decided instead to work on Get a Life. He was a fan of The Simpsons before being hired for the show, and started work in November 1992. Due to the show's long production cycle, season five did not air until the following September. Mirkin was the program's first solo showrunner. Due to the high staff departure at the end of season four, Mirkin "pretty much had to build [the] show from the ground up again", and noted that this "was exciting but also a big challenge". He hired several new writers, including Richard Appel, David X. Cohen, Jennifer Crittenden, Greg Daniels, Bob Kushell, Jace Richdale and Mike Scully.

Mirkin's tenure on The Simpsons has been cited as a period where the series evolved to focus more on abstract and surreal stories and humor. A. O. Scott notes that "several veterans recall the 'crazy David Mirkin years' as a time of wild inventiveness." In The Simpsons: An Uncensored, Unauthorized History (2009), John Ortved describes Mirkin's era as moving the show away from more "realistic" emotional and character-based stories to "pure comedy" and "surreal" humor. In a 2004 interview with Animation Magazine, Mirkin stated that he felt that he "brought [the show] back to a more story-oriented" approach and increased the focus on characters and their emotions, although "at the same time still keeping it surreal and weird". Mirkin moved the show's focus toward Homer Simpson, and also developed some of its secondary characters, including Apu Nahasapeemapetilon. He also strongly opposed censorship and network interference, telling post-production supervisor Colin A.B.V. Lewis to ignore the list of changes sent by the Fox censors. He aimed to put "as much blood and guts" as possible into the episode "Treehouse of Horror V" as an attack on the censors.

Ortved—using interviews with writers Bob Kushell and Brent Forrester and Mirkin's assistant Charleen Easton—describes Mirkin as an "outsider" on the show, with the writing staff, at least initially, divided with respect to Mirkin's comedy and leadership style. Forrester described the latter as "a little bit dictatorial". Mirkin conducted the show's writing sessions in one room, rather than splitting the writers into two groups, as later showrunners would do, and often worked late into the night. Some praised Mirkin's leadership, including Appel, who felt that "the shows were great under him." Others criticised him, including Kushell, who clashed with Mirkin over the episode "A Star is Burns", a crossover with The Critic. In 2004, Mirkin stated that he "really wasn't at all intimidat[ed] to join [the show's writing] crew", because he "had worked with and written with" many of his fellow writers previously and concluded that, "[I took] this show in a direction that is more personal to me. I did that, had a great time doing that, and everyone was very receptive to that." Mirkin's era and style of humor are popular amongst the show's fans.

The season five episode "Deep Space Homer", in which the characters Homer and Barney are recruited by NASA, is Mirkin's first writing credit on The Simpsons, the second being "The Man Who Came to Be Dinner", which was co-written with Al Jean. Mirkin worked on the concept for a long time, basing the story on NASA's Teacher in Space Project scheme to send ordinary civilians into space in order to spark interest amongst the general public. The idea proved controversial to some of the show's writing staff, who felt that having Homer go into space was too "large" an idea. Series creator Matt Groening felt that the idea gave the writers "nowhere to go". Based on these attitudes, several jokes were toned down to make the episode feel more realistic, including the impression that everyone at NASA was as stupid as Homer. During re-writes, Mirkin and the other writers placed greater emphasis on the relationship between Homer and his family and on Homer's attempts to be a hero, but most of Mirkin's original script was retained. The episode is considered one of the show's best. Colin Kennedy of Empire magazine named it a "contender for greatest ever episode", and in Chris Turner's book, Planet Simpson, he says the episode is "second to none". Regarding the long sequence that begins with Homer eating potato chips in the space shuttle and ends with Kent Brockman's dramatic speech, Turner claimed that it was "simply among the finest comedic moments in the history of television". A copy of the episode was later sent to the International Space Station for astronauts to view. Mirkin considers the episode to be "very very special". Ortved says the episode, in its plot and surreal humor, epitomizes Mirkin's era.

Mirkin pitched the plots for the episodes "The Last Temptation of Homer", "Bart's Girlfriend" and "Homer the Great". He also produced the two-part episode "Who Shot Mr. Burns?", which aired as the finale of season six and the premiere of season seven. The writers decided to write the episode in two parts with a mystery that could be used as a contest. Mirkin suggested Maggie Simpson as the culprit because he felt it was funnier and wanted the culprit to be a family member.

After season six, Mirkin suggested Oakley and Weinstein take over as showrunners, but remained on the show in an advisory capacity, helping them with technical aspects of the show such as editing and sound mixing, and attending table readings of the scripts. He was the executive producer for three other episodes from season seven: "Lisa the Vegetarian", "Radioactive Man" and "Team Homer". "Lisa the Vegetarian" was approved by Mirkin after the story was pitched by Cohen; Mirkin had just become a vegetarian himself, and so many of Lisa's experiences in the episode were based on his own. Mirkin flew to London to record the episode's guest stars Paul and Linda McCartney at Paul's recording studio, where the McCartneys spent an hour recording their parts. Mirkin later said that recording with the McCartneys was one of the most "amazing" experiences of his life and considers the episode to be one of his favorites. Mirkin returned to the role of showrunner to produce the episodes "The Joy of Sect" and "All Singing, All Dancing" for season nine. He pitched the plot for "The Joy of Sect", because he was attracted to the notion of parodies of cults, calling them "comical, interesting and twisted".

As of 2012 Mirkin still works part-time on the show as a consultant, helping with the re-write process. The show's nine-month production cycle allows him to contribute to each episode in some form, whilst engaging in other projects as well. Mirkin also co-wrote The Simpsons Movie in 2007, and the 3D animated short The Longest Daycare in 2012, which was nominated for an Academy Award for Best Animated Short Film. Mirkin won four Primetime Emmy Awards and a Peabody Award for his work on The Simpsons.

=== Subsequent work ===
Mirkin directed the feature film Romy and Michele's High School Reunion in 1997. The film stars Mira Sorvino and Lisa Kudrow as two friends determined to show their former high school tormentors at their 10-year reunion that they have led successful lives. Mirkin said of the film: "These are women characters we haven't seen before. There are so few female buddy movies, written funny for women. Women don't get to do odd, strange, self-involved roles like these." He knew Kudrow previously and felt she was "perfect" for the role, but did not expect Sorvino would take the part given her recent Academy Award win for Mighty Aphrodite, but it "turn[ed] out that she'd had a horrible time in high school, so the story appealed to her". The film received critical praise, as did Mirkin's direction. James Berardinelli wrote that Mirkin "brings a lot of energy to the production, always keeping things moving", while Jack Matthews of the Los Angeles Times says Mirkin "knew exactly what he had here and composed it like frames in a comic strip, ordering cheerful snow-cone colors for everything from the girls' childlike outfits to the decor of a Laundromat".

In 1999, several of the Fox executives who had disliked Get a Life came to Mirkin and apologized for the way they had treated the show, stating that they now found it funny. They commissioned Mirkin to write, produce and direct a similarly themed show of his choice. Mirkin produced a pilot for Jeff of the Universe, a "sarcastic" parody of the science fiction genre. The executives who had disproved of Get a Life had since moved from the Fox Network to Fox Studios, and they liked this new show. However, the new executives at Fox did not, and chose not to air the show. Mirkin often plays clips from the show at the talks he does at colleges; they receive a positive response.

Heartbreakers, Mirkin's second film as a feature director, was released in 2001. Mirkin rejected the project three times because he disliked the script. While he liked the idea of a mother and daughter con-woman team, he found the writing "really broad", and "it had no emotion in it." Eventually, Mirkin was allowed to rewrite the script himself, which he did in a year's time. He filmed the project in Florida and Los Angeles and had a cameo appearance in the film as Jack's lawyer. Reactions to both the film and Mirkin's direction of it were more varied compared to Romy and Michele's High School Reunion. Roger Ebert said the film was not "as sly and has no ambition to be [as] charming" as Romy and Michele's High School Reunion, "but in a season of dreary failed comedies it does what a comedy must: It makes us laugh". Chris Hewitt of Empire wrote that "Mirkin's direction is a little flat, but he's clearly having tremendous fun," but Susan Wloszczyna of USA Today opined that Mirkin "never gets the timing right and allows the story to drag with little internal logic".

Mirkin was attached to direct Sports Widow in 2004, a comedy starring Reese Witherspoon as a disregarded housewife who seeks to become an expert in American football in order to regain her husband's attention; the project has never been completed. Mirkin is a fan of the musician James Taylor; Taylor guest starred in "Deep Space Homer" and Mirkin directed the music videos for his songs "Enough to Be on Your Way" and "Sea Cruise". As of 2012, Mirkin will write, direct and co-produce a biopic of businessman Richard Branson, based on his memoir Losing My Virginity.

== Personal life ==
Mirkin is a vegetarian. In the early 1990s, Mirkin was in a relationship with actress Julie Brown, with whom he had worked on The Julie Show and The Edge.

== Credits ==
Film
Year	Title	Role
1986	Last Resort	Actor (as Walter Ambrose)
1997	Romy and Michele's High School Reunion	Director
2001	Heartbreakers	Director; Actor (as Jack's lawyer)
2007	The Simpsons Movie	Writer
2012	The Longest Daycare	Writer, short film
2022	When Billie Met Lisa	Writer, short film
2022	The Simpsons Meet the Bocellis in "Feliz Navidad"	Writer, short film
2024	May the 12th Be with You	Writer, short film

Television
Year	Title	Role	Notes
1983–1984	Three's Company	Writer, story editor	Wrote: "Janet's Little Helper", "Out on a Limb", "Now You See It, Now You Don't", "Look What I Found", "Jack Takes Off", "Forget Me Not" (teleplay)
1984	Three's a Crowd	Writer	Wrote: "A Little Competition"
1984–1988	Newhart	Executive producer and showrunner, writer, director, executive script supervisor	Wrote: "Lady in Wading", "You're Nobody 'til Somebody Hires You", "The Geezers in the Band", "The Stratford Horror Picture Show", "Torn Between Three Brothers", "Co-Hostess Twinkie", "Thanksgiving for the Memories", "Night Moves", "Telethon Man", A Friendship That Will Last a Lunchtime", "A Midseason's Night Dream"; Directed: "Night Moves", "Telethon Man", "A Midseason's Night Dream"
1986	It's Garry Shandling's Show	Writer	
1987	The Tracey Ullman Show	Writer	
1990–1992	Get a Life	Creator, executive producer, writer, director, actor	Wrote: "Terror on the Hell Loop 2000", "Drivers License", "Married", "Psychic 2000", "Chris Moves Out", "Girlfriend 2000", "Clip Show"; Directed: "Terror on the Hell Loop 2000", "The Prettiest Week of My Life", "Drivers License", "Bored Straight", "The Counterfeit Watch Story", "Married", "The Construction Worker Show", "Neptune 2000", "Chris and Larry Switch Lives", "Psychic 2000", "Chris Moves Out", "Larry on the Loose", "Meat Locker 2000", "Chris Gets His Tonsils Out", "Prisoner of Love", "Girlfriend 2000", "Bad Fish", "Spewey and Me", "1977 2000", "Clip Show"; Actor: "Larry on the Loose" (as Businessman)
1991	The Julie Show	Creator, executive producer	
1992–1993	The Edge	Creator, executive producer, writer, director	
1992, 1998	The Larry Sanders Show	Writer, consultant, director	Directed: "The Beginning of the End"
1993–present	The Simpsons	Executive producer and showrunner (1993–1995, 1996, 1998) producer, consulting producer and writer	Wrote: "Deep Space Homer"; Co-Wrote: "The Man Who Came to Be Dinner (with Al Jean)"; Directed: "Treehouse of Horror VI" (live-action segment)
1999	Jeff of the Universe	Creator, producer, director, writer	

== Bibliography ==
- Berardinelli, James (2005). ReelViews 2: The Ultimate Guide to the Best 1,000 Modern Movies on DVD and Video, 2005 Edition. Justin, Charles & Co. ISBN 1-932112-40-5.
- Ortved, John (2009). Simpsons Confidential: The uncensored, totally unauthorised history of the world's greatest TV show by the people that made it (UK ed.). Ebury Press. ISBN 978-0-09-192729-5.
- Groening, Matt (1997). Richmond, Ray; Coffman, Antonia (eds.). The Simpsons: A Complete Guide to Our Favorite Family (1st ed.). New York: HarperPerennial. ISBN 978-0-06-095252-5. LCCN 98141857. OCLC 37796735. OL 433519M.
- Turner, Chris (2004). Planet Simpson: How a Cartoon Masterpiece Documented an Era and Defined a Generation. Foreword by Douglas Coupland (1st ed.). Toronto: Random House Canada. ISBN 978-0-679-31318-2. OCLC 55682258.
