= Lisa's Wedding =

- The Simpsons episode
- Homer talks to Lisa on the morning of her wedding. For the episode, nearly all the characters were given aged designs. In Homer's case, he was made heavier with some extra lines on his face and less hair.
- Episode no.: Season 6 Episode 19
- Directed by: Jim Reardon
- Written by: Greg Daniels
- Production code: 2F15
- Original air date: March 19, 1995

Guest appearances
- Phil Hartman as Troy McClure; Mandy Patinkin as Hugh Parkfield

Episode features
- Chalkboard gag: "I will not strut around like I own the place"
- Couch gag: The couch springs the family off, lodging their heads in the ceiling.
- Commentary: James L. Brooks; David Mirkin; Greg Daniels

Episode chronology
← Previous "A Star Is Burns"	Next → "Two Dozen and One Greyhounds"
- The Simpsons season 6

"Lisa's Wedding" is the nineteenth episode of the sixth season of the American animated television series The Simpsons. It originally aired on Fox in the United States on March 19, 1995. The plot focuses on Lisa visiting a carnival fortune teller and learning about her wedding in the then far-off future of 2010. It was written by Greg Daniels and directed by Jim Reardon. Mandy Patinkin guest stars as Hugh Parkfield and Phil Hartman guest stars as Troy McClure. The episode won the Emmy in 1995 for Outstanding Animated Program, becoming the third episode of The Simpsons to win the Emmy.

== Plot ==
The Simpson family visit a Renaissance fair, where Lisa finds a fortune-telling booth. The fortune-teller says she will predict Lisa's future and tell the story of her true love.

In the year 2010—15 years in the future—23-year-old Lisa meets a fellow university student named Hugh Parkfield from London. The pair fall madly in love and soon plan to marry. Lisa and Hugh travel to Springfield, where they plan to hold the wedding. Marge is still a housewife; 25-year-old Bart is twice-divorced and works as a building demolition expert while planning on going to law school; 15-year-old Maggie is apparently a good singer and a frequent talker (although whenever she tries to talk or sing in the episode she is interrupted); and Homer still works at the Springfield Nuclear Power Plant in Sector 7G, with Milhouse as his supervisor.

Despite Lisa's hopes, Hugh does not get along with her family, and is particularly dismayed when Homer wants him to wear family-tradition cufflinks resembling pigs on his wedding day. Lisa begs Hugh to wear the cufflinks, and he agrees on the condition that Lisa abandon her family after the wedding because Hugh is deeply embarrassed by them (although he agrees to let Marge visit once they have children). Outraged, Lisa insists she cannot marry him if he cannot understand that she loves her family members—despite their shortcomings—and calls off the wedding. Hugh returns to England and never sees Lisa again.

In the present, Lisa questions the fortune-teller about her "true love" and the fortune-teller reveals that although Lisa will have a true love, she specializes in foretelling doomed romances. Lisa leaves the booth and finds Homer, who is excited to tell her about his day at the fair.

== Production ==
The episode was written by Greg Daniels and directed by Jim Reardon. The idea for the episode came from James L. Brooks, who called David Mirkin and pitched the idea as traveling to the future and Lisa meeting the perfect man, who in turn cannot stand her family. Believing that it would be a tough episode to write, Brooks gave the job to Greg Daniels, who was enthusiastic about it and has said that it was a lot easier and more fun to write than expected. The plot involving Homer's cuff links was not in the original draft; it was later added because the writers felt that something was needed to represent Hugh's disdain for the Simpson family. The end theme was redone by Alf Clausen as a "Renaissance version", including a harp.

Everything in the episode had to be redesigned, including the sets and all the characters. Homer was given a heavier build, had one hair removed, and had an extra line added under each eye. Lisa was given frilled and smoothed back hair, Marge had her blue hair lightened, Bart received a beard line, Maggie was given a teenage design with a punk aesthetic and Krusty was redesigned to resemble Groucho Marx. The night sky was intentionally made a more reddish color as a subtle joke towards how the producers thought the world would be much more polluted in 2010. Nancy Cartwright's Bart voice was electronically lowered.

This is the first of several future-themed episodes. It was followed by "Bart to the Future" in season 11, "Future-Drama" in season 16, "Holidays of Future Passed" in season 23, and "Days of Future Future" in season 25. While both "Lisa's Wedding" and "Future-Drama" were nominated for an Emmy, in 2003, Entertainment Weekly named "Bart to the Future" the worst episode in the history of the series.

== Cultural references ==
The beginning of Lisa and Hugh's romance is similar to the one in the 1970 film Love Story. Hugh and Lisa attend "40 classic films starring Jim Carrey" in 2010. According to David Mirkin, this is a joke about how "huge" Carrey's films were at the time, and how he was not garnering much respect as an actor. Lisa wandering away from the Renaissance fair while following a rabbit is similar to the plot of Alice's Adventures In Wonderland. The sounds of the car are the same as the ones used in The Jetsons. On Lisa's wall there is a poster of Rolling Stones Steel Wheelchair Tour 2010. Wrist communicators are using the same sounds as communicators in Star Trek. In this episode's version of the future, apparently three of the major American television networks have been bought by ABC and merged into CNNBCBS. Hugh Parkfield is a parody of English actor Hugh Grant. Martin Prince's fate is a parody of The Phantom of the Opera. The song that he plays on the organ is a variation of "A Fifth of Beethoven" by Walter Murphy, a disco version of Beethoven's "Symphony No. 5" in C Minor.

== Reception and legacy ==
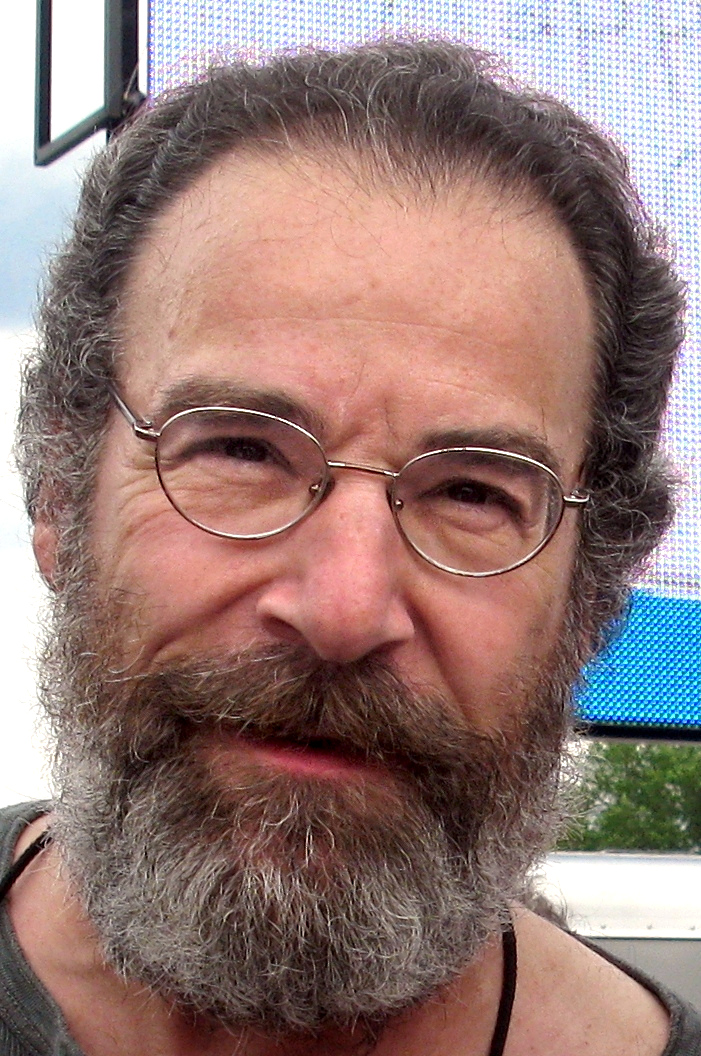
Various publications have named Mandy Patinkin as one of the series' best guest stars.

In its original broadcast, "Lisa's Wedding" finished 52nd in ratings for the week of March 13–19, 1995, with a Nielsen rating of 9.1, equivalent to approximately 8.7 million viewing households. It was the third-highest-rated show on the Fox network that week, following Beverly Hills, 90210 and Melrose Place.

"Lisa's Wedding" won an Emmy Award in 1995 for Outstanding Animated Program, becoming the third episode of The Simpsons to win in the category. This episode is a favorite of James L. Brooks, who believes that it is one of the best-written episodes and ranks near the top of The Simpsons episodes. The emotion of "Lisa's Wedding" is often compared with season two's "Lisa's Substitute".

Mandy Patinkin as Hugh is considered one of the best The Simpsons guest spots by Chris Turner in his book Planet Simpson, who says that many of the best The Simpsons guest stars have been lesser known celebrities. In a 2008 article, Entertainment Weekly named Patinkin one of the 16 best The Simpsons guest stars. In 1998, TV Guide listed it as the first in its list of top twelve episodes, calling it "the premier example of what makes a Simpsons episode work." In 2007, The Daily Telegraph characterized the episode as one of "The 10 Best Simpsons TV Episodes".

On August 1, 2010, the day of Lisa's wedding in the episode, the name "Lisa Simpson" was a trending topic on Twitter. Most of the Twitter users that tweeted her name wished her a happy wedding day.

Erik Adams writes: "The show exists in a static world, and 'Lisa's Wedding' uses that to its advantage, altering the surface of the show while retaining its core components. Everything changes, but some things remain the same—one of those things being the unbreakable bond between Lisa and Homer. Like the Simpson family cufflinks and a tuxedo, they shouldn't fit together—and yet they do. Capturing that sense in such humorous, heartwarming fashion is part of the magic of vintage-era Simpsons."
