= Brother from the Same Planet =

- The Simpsons episode
- Episode no.: Season 4 Episode 14
- Directed by: Jeffrey Lynch
- Written by: Jon Vitti
- Production code: 9F12
- Original air date: February 4, 1993

Guest appearances
- Phil Hartman as Tom and Mr. Muntz

Episode features
- Chalkboard gag: "The Principal's toupee is not a frisbee"
- Couch gag: The rear wall rotates, taking the family to another room and leaving an empty couch behind.
- Commentary: Matt Groening; Al Jean; Mike Reiss; Jon Vitti; Jeffrey Lynch

Episode chronology
← Previous "Selma's Choice"	Next → "I Love Lisa"
- The Simpsons season 4

"Brother from the Same Planet" is the fourteenth episode of the fourth season of the American animated television series The Simpsons. It first aired on Fox in the United States on February 4, 1993. In the episode, Bart, furious with Homer for taking too long to pick him up from soccer practice on a rainy day, turns to the Bigger Brothers Agency, which pairs up fatherless boys with adult male role models (a parody of the Big Brothers of America). Meanwhile, Lisa becomes addicted to the Corey hotline, a phone service where television fans can listen to the voice of a teen idol.

The episode was written by Jon Vitti and directed by Jeffrey Lynch. The producers tried to cast Tom Cruise for the role of Tom, but Cruise declined and they chose Phil Hartman instead. "Brother from the Same Planet" received favorable reception in books and in the media; a contemporary review in Entertainment Weekly said it "may be the best Simpsons show ever" and it was named one of the five best episodes of the series by the writers of King of the Hill.

== Plot ==
On a rainy day, Bart waits for Homer to pick him up from soccer practice. However, Homer forgets to pick Bart up for many hours. Furious with Homer, Bart goes to the Bigger Brothers Agency, a mentor program which pairs up fatherless boys with positive male role models.

Bart claims that his father was an alcoholic gambler who abandoned him and is paired with Tom, a military test pilot. Bart and Tom enjoy a variety of activities together, though Bart begins to feel guilty for taking up Tom's time despite not actually being fatherless. Homer finds out about Tom and decides to get revenge by becoming a Bigger Brother himself. A poor young boy named Pepi comes to the agency looking for a Bigger Brother. Taking pity on him, Homer decides to take Pepi as his Little Brother.

Meanwhile, Marge discovers that the cost of her family's monthly phone bill is abnormally high. She figures out Lisa is making calls to the Corey hotline, a premium rate phone service where fans can listen to the voice of a teen heartthrob. Lisa promises to stop using the family's phone to make calls to the hotline, only to contradict herself by using phones in different places. After getting caught using the school's phone to place a call, Principal Skinner calls an emergency meeting with Marge, who tries to get Lisa to try to go until midnight without calling the hotline, which she accomplishes.

Homer, Pepi, Bart and Tom attend Bigger Brothers Day at Marine World. Homer runs into Bart and Tom and reveals that he is Bart's father leading to a brawl between the two men. The fight rages across Springfield and ends when Homer becomes injured after landing on a fire hydrant. Feeling remorseful, Bart decides to forgive Homer. Tom laments how he will miss being a Bigger Brother, while Pepi is sad over losing his own. Bart suggests Tom become Pepi's big brother, which both happily agree and walk into the sunset holding hands.

== Production ==
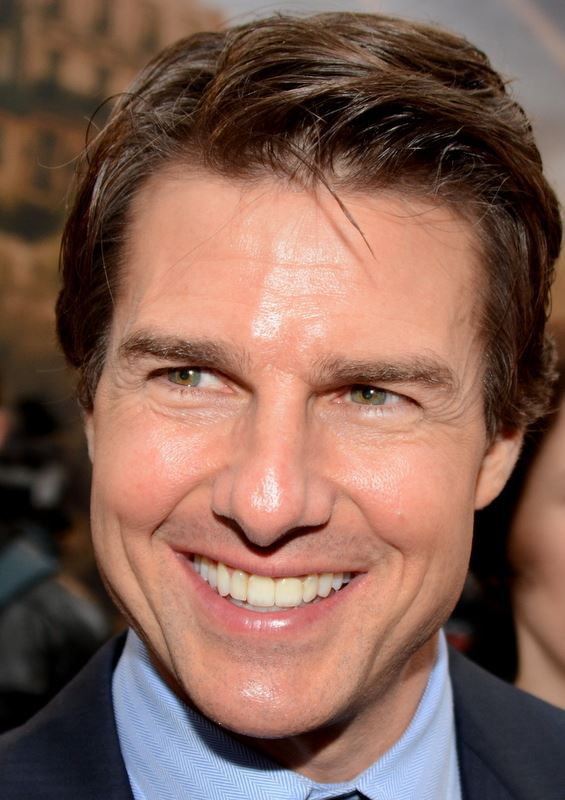
The character Tom was originally written for Tom Cruise.

The episode was written by Jon Vitti and directed by Jeffrey Lynch. It originally aired in the United States on February 4, 1993, on Fox. The role of Tom was written for Tom Cruise. However, when offered the part, Cruise repeatedly turned it down, so the producers used Phil Hartman. Corey is a composite of Corey Feldman and Corey Haim, known as The Two Coreys. Pepi was based on the title character of the daily comic strip Dondi.

In one scene of the episode, Bart and Tom watch a fictitious episode of The Ren & Stimpy Show. Gracie Films contacted Nickelodeon to get authorization to use Ren and Stimpy for that sequence. Nickelodeon was strict about what The Simpsons was allowed to do, and they were not allowed to make the duo uncharacteristically savage as they wanted. Animators from Games Animation who worked on the series, including Chris Reccardi, offered to do the layouts of Ren and Stimpy for the episode. Another show Bart watches, Tuesday Night Live, is a parody of NBC's Saturday Night Live. Krusty appears in a sketch called "The Big Ear Family", and says that the sketch goes on for twelve more minutes, even though the joke's punchline has already been established. That was Vitti's way of criticizing Saturday Night Live for having overlong sketches with thin joke premises. The sequence originally had a longer version of the Tuesday Night Live band playing into the commercial break, but it was cut because Vitti, who was a writer on Saturday Night Live during the 1985–86 season along with fellow Simpsons writers George Meyer and John Swartzwelder, did not want to come off as being bitter.

The writers were looking for an ending, and executive producer Sam Simon suggested they watch The Quiet Man. The writers came in on a Saturday to watch it, and were inspired by the fight scene between John Wayne and Victor McLaglen to do a fight scene between Homer and Tom. The scene was difficult for the producers to sound-mix because they wanted it to sound comedic but not horrifying. They discovered that the more realistic the effects used sounded, the funnier the scene became. The producers tried all sorts of different sound effects for when Homer cracks his back on the fire hydrant and chose the tiniest realistic sound, because they believed that it was the most painful and "hilarious".

== Cultural references ==
The title of the episode is a reference to The Brother from Another Planet (1984). Milhouse and two other kids say they're going to sneak into an R-Rated movie, chanting "Barton Fink!" The scene where Milhouse writes "Trab pu kcip!" on the wall is a reference to Stanley Kubrick's The Shining (1980). The woman Bart mistakes for Homer is singing the Helen Reddy song "I Am Woman". While Bart is stuck in the storm waiting for Homer, a nun is lifted by the wind, a reference to the TV series The Flying Nun, and explodes. Bart and Tom watch The Ren & Stimpy Show. When Homer watches TV, the announcer says "Tonight, on Wings" before trailing off: "...ah, who cares." He also watches an NFL Films production about Bart Starr, the quarterback on the Green Bay Packers who led the team to victory in the first two Super Bowls.

Marge tells Lisa that, as a girl, she had a crush on Bobby Sherman, to Lisa's amusement. The scene where Homer accuses Bart of seeing his big brother is a reference to Who's Afraid of Virginia Woolf? (1966), where Richard Burton accuses Elizabeth Taylor of adultery. In a flashback sequence, Bart tells Homer to shut up and shoves half a grapefruit in his face, a reference to James Cagney in The Public Enemy (1931). Bart watches Tuesday Night Live, a parody of NBC's Saturday Night Live. During the fight scene between Homer and Tom, the background music is a parody of the music used in the fight scene in The Quiet Man (1952), and the fighting pose Tom makes is a parody of the Street Fighter II introduction sequence. Skinner's disturbing monologue about his mother watching him is a parody of Norman Bates' similar dialogue from Alfred Hitchcock's Psycho (1960).

== Reception ==
In its original broadcast, "Brother from the Same Planet" finished 18th in ratings for the week of February 1–7, 1993, with a Nielsen rating of 14.9, equivalent to approximately 13.9 million viewing households. It was the highest-rated show on the Fox network that week, beating Martin.

In their section on the episode in the book I Can't Believe It's a Bigger and Better Updated Unofficial Simpsons Guide, Gary Russell and Gareth Roberts, comment: "We love Homer sitting at home trying to remember to pick up Bart—he's watching a TV show about a football star called Bart, with pictures of Bart on all sides, and even Maggie seems to be calling her brother's name." Writing in the compilation work The Psychology of The Simpsons, Robert M. Arkin and Philip J. Mazzocco reference a scene from the episode where Homer "argues with his own brain about a desired course of action" to illustrate self-discrepancy theory, the idea that "humans will go to great lengths to attain and preserve self-esteem".

The writers of King of the Hill named "Brother from the Same Planet" as one of the five best episodes of The Simpsons, along with "Homer the Heretic", "Lisa's Wedding", "Lisa's Substitute", and "Behind the Laughter". Mikey Cahill of the Herald Sun highlighted the quote "PickupBart? What the hell is PickupBart?" by Homer in his list of "Fab Fives" related to The Simpsons. When asked to pick his favorite season out of The Simpsons seasons one through twenty, Paul Lane of the Niagara Gazette picked season four and highlighted "Brother from the Same Planet" and "Mr. Plow" which he called "excellent", along with "the sweetly funny" "Lisa's First Word", and "Homer the Heretic". In a review of The Simpsons season four, Lyndsey Shinoda of Video Store cited "Brother from the Same Planet" and "I Love Lisa" among her "personal favorites" from the season. Reviewing season four in Entertainment Weekly, Ken Tucker called the episode "a masterpiece of tiny, throwaway details that accumulate into a worldview."
