= Lisa Simpson =

Fictional character from The Simpsons franchise

- The Simpsons character
- First appearance: "Good Night"; The Tracey Ullman Show; April 19, 1987
- Created by: Matt Groening; James L. Brooks; Sam Simon
- Designed by: Matt Groening
- Voiced by: Yeardley Smith

In-universe information
- Full name: Lisa Marie Simpson
- Occupation: 2nd grader at Springfield Elementary School
- Family: Homer Simpson (father); Marge Simpson (mother); Bart Simpson (brother); Maggie Simpson (sister)
- Relatives: Abe Simpson (grandfather); Mona Simpson (grandmother; deceased); Clancy Bouvier (grandfather; deceased); Jacqueline Bouvier (grandmother); Patty Bouvier (aunt); Selma Bouvier (aunt); Herb Powell (half-uncle); Abbey (half-aunt)
- Religion: Buddhism (previously Christianity)
- Home: 742 Evergreen Terrace, Springfield, United States
- Nationality: American

Lisa Marie Simpson is a fictional character and one of the main protagonists in the animated television sitcom series The Simpsons. She is the middle child of the Simpson family. Voiced by Yeardley Smith, Lisa was born as a character in The Tracey Ullman Show short "Good Night" on April 19, 1987. Cartoonist Matt Groening created and designed her while waiting to meet James L. Brooks. Groening had been invited to pitch a series of shorts based on his comic Life in Hell, but instead decided to create a new set of characters. He named the older Simpson daughter after his younger sister Lisa Groening Bartlett. After appearing on The Tracey Ullman Show for three years, the Simpson family were moved to their own series on Fox, which debuted on December 17, 1989. Lisa has appeared in every episode of The Simpsons except for "Carl Carlson Rides Again".

Intelligent, kind, and passionate about the planet and all living things, Lisa Simpson is the second child of Homer and Marge. She is the younger sister of Bart, and the older sister of Maggie. At age 8, Lisa's high intellect and left-wing political stance creates a barrier between her and other children her age. She is a loner and a social outcast. Lisa is a vegan, a bibliophile, a strong environmentalist, a feminist, and a Buddhist. Lisa's character develops many times over the course of the show: she becomes a vegetarian in season 7, converts to Buddhism in season 13, and becomes a vegan in season 32. A strong liberal and activist for peace, equality, and the environment, Lisa advocates for a variety of political causes (e.g. standing against apartheid in South Africa and supporting the Tibetan independence movement) which sets her against most of the people in Springfield. However, she can also be somewhat intolerant of opinions that differ from her own, often refusing to consider alternative perspectives and showing a feeling of self-righteousness. In her free time, Lisa enjoys many hobbies such as reading and playing the baritone saxophone. She has appeared in other media relating to The Simpsons—including video games, The Simpsons Movie, The Simpsons Ride, commercials and comic books—and inspired a line of merchandise.

Yeardley Smith originally tried out for the role of Bart, while Nancy Cartwright (who was later cast as the voice for Bart) tried out for Lisa. Producers considered Smith's voice too high for a boy, so she was given the role of Lisa. In the Tracey Ullman Show shorts, Lisa was something of a "female Bart" who mirrored her brother's mischief, but as the series progressed, she became a liberal voice of reason which has drawn both praise and criticism from fans of the show. Because of her unusual, pointed hairstyle, many animators consider Lisa the most difficult Simpsons character to draw.

TV Guide ranked her 11th (tied with Bart) on their list of the "Top 50 Greatest Cartoon Characters of All Time". Her environmentalism has been especially well-received; several episodes featuring her have won Genesis and Environmental Media Awards, including a special "board of directors Ongoing Commitment Award" in 2001. People for the Ethical Treatment of Animals included Lisa on their list of the "Most Animal-Friendly TV Characters of All Time". Yeardley Smith won a Primetime Emmy Award for Outstanding Voice-Over Performance in 1992 and Lisa and her family were awarded a star on the Hollywood Walk of Fame in 2000.

== Role in The Simpsons ==
The Simpsons uses a floating timeline in which the characters do not physically age. The show itself is perpetually set in the year of broadcast (except for occasional flashbacks and flashforwards). In several episodes, events have been linked to specific time periods, although this timeline has been contradicted in subsequent episodes. Lisa's year of birth is given in "Lisa's First Word" (season 4, 1992) as 1984, during the Summer Olympics. The episode "That '90s Show" (season 19, 2008), however, contradicts much of the established backstory; for example, it presents Homer and Marge as being childless in the late 1990s. Despite this, Lisa is portrayed as being 38 years old. Lisa is a lover of music, with jazz as her favorite genre; she specifically singles out Miles Davis's 1957 album Birth of the Cool as her favorite album. She enjoys and excels at playing the saxophone and became friends with jazz musician Bleeding Gums Murphy, whom she regards as an idol. Murphy helps pull Lisa out of her depression in "Moaning Lisa" (season 1, 1990). She is later deeply saddened by Murphy's death in "'Round Springfield" (season 6, 1995).

Lisa has had a few brief relationships with boys, including Ralph Wiggum in "I Love Lisa" (season 4, 1993), Nelson Muntz in "Lisa's Date with Density" (season 8, 1996) and Colin in The Simpsons Movie (2007). Bart's best friend Milhouse Van Houten has a crush on her, but despite dropping unsubtle hints about his feelings, he has been unsuccessful in winning her affection. Her voice actor Yeardley Smith said Muntz would make a good match for Lisa. In 2019, Simpsons showrunner Al Jean said he saw Lisa as being "possibly polyamorous" in the future. In the Season 23 episode "Holidays of Future Passed" Lisa is shown holding hands with an unnamed dark-haired woman in a photo, and then shown in a second photo where she is holding hands with two different women at once, suggesting polyamory; she later ends up with Milhouse. However, this episode is non-canon.

At age 8, Lisa's high intellect and left-wing political stance creates a barrier between her and other children her age. She is a loner and a social outcast. Lisa is a vegan, a bibliophile, a strong environmentalist, a feminist, and a Buddhist. Lisa's character develops many times over the course of the show: she becomes a vegetarian in season 7, converts to Buddhism in season 13, and becomes a vegan in season 32. A strong liberal and activist for peace, equality, and the environment, Lisa advocates for a variety of political causes (e.g. standing against apartheid in South Africa and supporting the Tibetan independence movement) which sets her against most of the people in Springfield. However, she can also be somewhat intolerant of opinions that differ from her own, often refusing to consider alternative perspectives and showing a feeling of self-righteousness. In her free time, Lisa enjoys many hobbies such as reading and playing the baritone saxophone.

Lisa is the most intellectual member of the Simpson family (she has an IQ of 159), and many episodes of the series focus on her fighting for various causes. Lisa is often the focus of episodes with "a real moral or philosophical point", which according to former writer David S. Cohen is because "you really buy her as caring about it." Lisa's political convictions are generally left-wing and liberal and she often contests other's views. She is a vegetarian, feminist, environmentalist and a supporter of gay rights, universal healthcare, and the Free Tibet movement. In a special Christmas message for the UK in 2004 Lisa showed her support for Cornish nationalism, even speaking the Cornish language to get her message across. While supportive of the general ideals of the Christian church in which she was raised, Lisa became a practicing Buddhist in the episode "She of Little Faith" (season 13, 2001) after she learned about the Noble Eightfold Path.

Lisa, despite being a child prodigy, often sees herself as a misfit within the Simpson family and other children due to possessing an unusually high level of intelligence. She shows characteristics rarely seen in Springfield, including spirituality and commitment to peaceful ways, and is notably more concerned with world affairs than her life in Springfield, with her rebellion against social norms being depicted as constructive and heroic, yet she can be self-righteous at times. In "Lisa the Vegetarian", an increasing sense of moral righteousness leads her to disrupt her father's roast-pig barbecue, an act for which she later apologizes. Like most children her age, she thinks in images rather than words. Episodes often take shots at Lisa's idealism. In "Bart Star" (season nine, 1997), Lisa, who is departing from her typically more genuine nature and apparently looking for a new cause to crusade over, defiantly declares that she, a girl, would like to join the football team. In the 1990s, it was considered odd to allow a girl to play football. However, when coach Ned Flanders reveals that several girls already play for the team, she hesitates and claims football is "not really [her] thing". She then expresses distaste about a ball made of pig's skin, but one of the girls informs her that their footballs are synthetic and that proceeds are donated to Amnesty International. Upset by being unable to gain moral superiority, Lisa runs off.

Lisa is said to have an IQ of 159, and in "They Saved Lisa's Brain" (season ten, 1999) she becomes a member of the Springfield chapter of Mensa. Even prior to becoming a Buddhist, Lisa at times is seen meditating. When unable to attend school due to a teachers' strike in "The PTA Disbands" (season six, 1995), she suffers withdrawal symptoms because of the sudden lack of praise. She even demands that her mother grade her for no obvious reason. In Planet Simpson, Chris Turner writes that these traits make Lisa more realistic because "No character can aspire to realism without a few all-too-human flaws."

Although she is wise beyond her years, Lisa has typical childhood issues, sometimes requiring adult intervention. One episode to show this is "See Homer Run" (season seventeen, 2005) where she goes through a developmental condition which causes her to get into trouble at school. In "Lost Our Lisa" (season nine, 1998), she tricks Homer into allowing her to ride the bus alone, only to become hopelessly lost and in need of aid from her father. Chris Turner writes in Planet Simpson that incidents like this illustrate that "Even when Lisa's lecturing like a college professor or mounting yet another protest, she never becomes a full-grown adult trapped in a child's body." In The Simpsons and Philosophy: The D'oh! of Homer, Aeon J. Skoble states that although Lisa is an intellectual, she is still portrayed as a character who enjoys normal childhood and girl activities, plays with Malibu Stacy dolls, loves ponies, obsesses over teenage heartthrobs such as Corey, and watches The Itchy & Scratchy Show along with Bart. He writes, "One might argue that this is typical childhood behavior, but since in so many cases Lisa is presented not simply as a prodigy but as preternaturally wise, the fondness for Itchy & Scratchy and Corey seem to be highlighted, taking on greater significance. Lisa is portrayed as the avatar of logic and wisdom, but then she also worships Corey so she's 'no better [than the rest of us]'." Lisa occasionally worries that her family's dull habits will rub off on her, such as in "Lisa the Simpson" (season nine, 1998) she worries that the "Simpson gene" will make her a dimwit later finding out the gene only goes through the male side.

She is also concerned that Maggie may grow up to be like the rest of the family and tries to teach her complex ideas. Chris Turner writes in Planet Simpson that "Lisa embarks on quests to find solace for her yearning spirit ... but the most reliable source of truth she finds is the one she always believed in: her family. It is from the other Simpsons that Lisa draws stability, meaning, contentment." Her loyalty to her family is most clearly seen in the flashforward "Lisa's Wedding" (season six, 1995), in which she must reconcile her love for them with the distaste of her cultured fiancé. In the episode "Mother Simpson" (season seven, 1995) she meets her paternal grandmother Mona Simpson for the first time. Mona is also well-read and articulate, and the writers used the character as a way to explain the origins of Lisa's intelligence.

== Character ==
=== Creation ===
Matt Groening conceived Lisa and the rest of the Simpson family in 1986 in the lobby of producer James L. Brooks's office. Groening had been called in to pitch a series of animated shorts for The Tracey Ullman Show and had intended to present an adaptation of his Life in Hell comic strip. When he realized that animating Life in Hell would require him to rescind publication rights, Groening went in another direction, hurriedly sketching his version of a dysfunctional family, named after members of his own family. Lisa was named after Groening's younger sister, but little else was based on her. In The Tracey Ullman Show shorts, Lisa displayed none of the intelligence for which she later became known. She was more of a "female Bart" and was originally described as simply the "middle child", without much personality.

Lisa made her brief debut with the rest of the Simpson family on April 19, 1987, in The Tracey Ullman Show short "Good Night". On December 17, 1989, the shorts were adapted into The Simpsons, a half-hour series on the Fox Broadcasting Company.

=== Design ===
This image (gif) illustrates how to draw Lisa's head and hairline using the three-three-two arrangement

The entire Simpson family was designed to be easily recognized in silhouette. The family was crudely drawn, because Groening had submitted basic sketches to the animators, assuming they would clean them up; instead, they just traced over his drawings. Lisa's physical features are generally unique. In some early episodes, minor background characters occasionally had a similar hairline. However, in the later seasons, no character other than Maggie shares her hairline. While designing Lisa, Groening "couldn't be bothered to even think about girls' hairstyles". At the time, Groening was primarily drawing in black and white; when designing Lisa and Maggie, he "just gave them this kind of spiky starfish hair style, not thinking that they would eventually be drawn in color".

To draw Lisa's head and hair, most of the show's animators use what they call the "three-three-two arrangement". It begins with a circle, with two curving lines (one vertical, one horizontal) intersecting in the middle to indicate her eyeline. The vertical line continues outside of the circle to create one hair point, with two more added towards the back of her head. Three more points are then added in front (in the direction Lisa is facing), with two more behind it. Several Simpsons animators, including Pete Michels and David Silverman, consider Lisa the most difficult Simpsons character to draw. Silverman explains that "her head is so abstract" due to her hairstyle.

=== Voice ===
While the roles of Homer and Marge were given to Dan Castellaneta and Julie Kavner because they were already a part of the Tracey Ullman Show cast, the producers decided to hold casting for the roles of Bart and Lisa. Nancy Cartwright intended to audition for the role of Lisa, but disliked the character's bland description—Lisa was described simply as the "middle child"—and read for the role of Bart instead. Casting director Bonita Pietila brought Yeardley Smith in for an audition after seeing her performing in the play Living on Salvation Street. Smith was hesitant to audition for an animated series, but her agent had persuaded her to give it a try. Smith originally auditioned for the role of Bart but Pietila believed her voice was too high. Smith later recalled: "I always sounded too much like a girl, I read two lines as Bart and they said, 'Thanks for coming!'" Pietila offered Smith the role of Lisa instead.

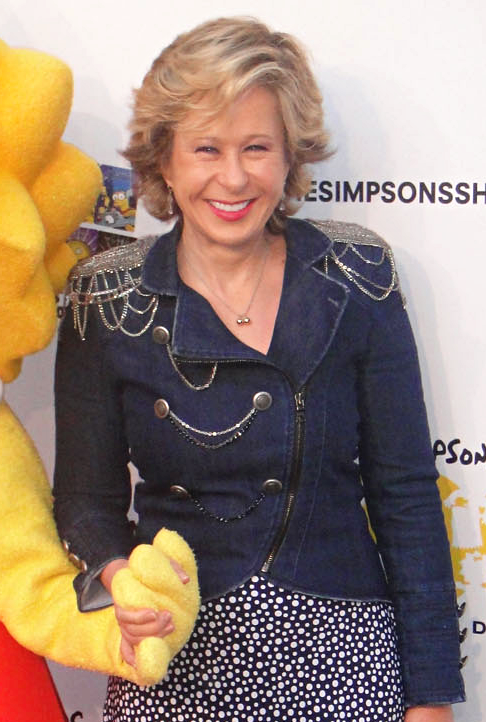
Lisa's voice actress Yeardley Smith

Smith and the show's writers worked to give Lisa a more defined personality, and she has developed greatly during the series. In her 2000 memoir My Life as a 10-Year-Old Boy, Cartwright wrote: "with the brilliant wit of the writers and the wry, in-your-eye, honest-to-a-fault interpretation, Yeardley Smith has made Lisa a bright light of leadership, full of compassion and competence beyond her years. Lisa Simpson is the kind of child we not only want our children to be but also the kind of child we want all children to be. But, at the time, on The Tracey Ullman Show, she was just an animated eight-year-old kid who had no personality."

Lisa is the only regular character voiced by Smith, who raises the pitch of her voice slightly for the role. In some earlier episodes she provided some of Maggie's squeaks and occasional speaking parts, and has voiced other characters on very rare occasions. Usually they are derivative of Lisa, such as Lisa Bella in "Last Tap Dance in Springfield" (season 11, 2000) and Lisa, Jr. in "Missionary: Impossible". (season 11, 2000)

It's a happy fluke. When she was cast back in 1987, I just liked the sound of her voice. She's also a great actress. In general, people who make their living doing voices on cartoons aren't always great for us. Most cartoons want things peppy and cartoony. Yeardley can go through moments of great emotion and wring it for all she's worth.

— Matt Groening on Smith's vocal style

Despite Lisa's fame, Smith is rarely recognized in public, which she does not mind. She said, "it's wonderful to be in the midst of all this hype about the show, and people enjoying the show so much, and to be totally a fly on the wall; people never recognize me solely from my voice." In a 2009 interview with The Guardian she commented that "It's the best job ever. I have nothing but gratitude for the amount of freedom The Simpsons has bought me in my life." Although Smith received a Primetime Emmy Award for Outstanding Voice-Over Performance in 1992, she considers it unimportant, saying "there's part of me that feels it wasn't even a real Emmy." The award is a Creative Arts prize not awarded during the primetime telecast and, at the time, a juried award without nominations. Still, Smith considers her work on the show a success. "If I had to be associated with one character in fiction," she said, "I will always be thrilled that it was Lisa Simpson." Matt Groening has described Smith as being very similar to Lisa: "Yeardley has strong moral views about her character. Some lines are written for Lisa that Yeardley reads and says, 'No, I wouldn't say that.'" Former Simpsons writer Jay Kogen praised her performance on the show, particularly in the episode "Lisa's Substitute", as able "to move past comedy to something really strong and serious and dramatic."

Until 1998, Smith was paid $30,000 per episode. A pay dispute erupted in 1998, during which Fox threatened to replace the six main voice actors with new actors, going as far as preparing for casting of new voices. The dispute was soon resolved, and Smith received $125,000 per episode until 2004 when the voice actors sought an increase to $360,000 per episode. The issue was resolved a month later, and Smith earned $250,000 per episode. New salary negotiations took place in 2008, and the voice actors currently receive approximately $400,000 per episode. Three years later, with Fox threatening to cancel the series unless production costs were cut, Smith and the other cast members accepted a 30 percent pay cut, down to just over $300,000 per episode.

=== Development ===
Lisa in her first televised appearance in "Good Night", while designers who worked on Lisa, Groening, who was primarily drawing in black and white, "just gave [her] this kind of spiky starfish hair style, not thinking that [she] would eventually be drawn in color"; Lisa's hair points would eventually be made less spiky

In The Tracey Ullman Show shorts, Lisa was something of a "female Bart": equally mischievous but lacking unique traits. As the series progressed, Lisa began to develop into a more intelligent and more emotional character. She demonstrates her intellect in the 1990 episode "Krusty Gets Busted" (season one), by helping Bart reveal Sideshow Bob's plot to frame Krusty the Clown for armed robbery. Many episodes focusing on Lisa have an emotional nature, such as "Moaning Lisa" (season one, 1990). The idea for the episode was pitched by James L. Brooks, who wanted to do an emotional episode involving Lisa's sadness, to complement the many "jokey episodes" in the first season.

In the seventh-season episode "Lisa the Vegetarian" (1995), Lisa permanently becomes a vegetarian, distinguishing her as one of the first primetime television characters to make such a choice. The episode was written by David S. Cohen (in his first solo writing credit), who jotted down the idea one day while eating lunch. Then-executive producer David Mirkin, who had recently become a vegetarian himself, quickly approved the idea. Several of Lisa's experiences in the episode are based on Mirkin's own experiences. The episode guest stars musician Paul McCartney, a committed vegetarian and animal rights activist. McCartney's condition for appearing was that Lisa would remain a vegetarian and would not revert the next week (as is common on situation comedies). The trait stayed and is one of the few permanent character changes made in the show. In the season 13 episode "She of Little Faith" (2001), Lisa underwent another permanent character change when she converted to Buddhism.

Lisa plays the baritone saxophone, and some episodes use that as a plot device. According to Matt Groening, the baritone saxophone was chosen because he found the thought of an eight-year-old girl playing it amusing. He added, "But she doesn't always play a baritone sax because the animators don't know what it looks like, so it changes shape and color from show to show." One of the hallmarks of the show's opening sequence is a brief solo Lisa plays on her saxophone after being thrown out of music class. The Simpsons composer Alf Clausen said that the session musicians who perform her solos do not try to play at the second-grade level and instead "think of Lisa as a really good player." Lisa is also a skilled multi-instrumentalist. In addition to the saxophone, she can also play guitar (as shown in "Last Exit to Springfield"), bass guitar (as shown in "Whacking Day"), and piano (as shown in "Miracle on Evergreen Terrace").

=== Personality ===
[Lisa is] a good soul. I love that she is so compassionate. She is wise beyond her years. She has remarkable optimism, despite the fact that she's disappointed so often.

— Yeardley Smith

Lisa, despite being a child prodigy, often sees herself as a misfit within the Simpson family and other children due to possessing an unusually high level of intelligence. She shows characteristics rarely seen in Springfield, including spirituality and commitment to peaceful ways, and is notably more concerned with world affairs than her life in Springfield, with her rebellion against social norms being depicted as constructive and heroic, yet she can be self-righteous at times. In "Lisa the Vegetarian", an increasing sense of moral righteousness leads her to disrupt her father's roast-pig barbecue, an act for which she later apologizes. Like most children her age, she thinks in images rather than words. Episodes often take shots at Lisa's idealism. In "Bart Star" (season nine, 1997), Lisa, who is departing from her typically more genuine nature and apparently looking for a new cause to crusade over, defiantly declares that she, a girl, would like to join the football team. In the 1990s, it was considered odd to allow a girl to play football. However, when coach Ned Flanders reveals that several girls already play for the team, she hesitates and claims football is "not really [her] thing". She then expresses distaste about a ball made of pig's skin, but one of the girls informs her that their footballs are synthetic and that proceeds are donated to Amnesty International. Upset by being unable to gain moral superiority, Lisa runs off.

Lisa is said to have an IQ of 159, and in "They Saved Lisa's Brain" (season ten, 1999) she becomes a member of the Springfield chapter of Mensa. Even prior to becoming a Buddhist, Lisa at times is seen meditating. When unable to attend school due to a teachers' strike in "The PTA Disbands" (season six, 1995), she suffers withdrawal symptoms because of the sudden lack of praise. She even demands that her mother grade her for no obvious reason. In Planet Simpson, Chris Turner writes that these traits make Lisa more realistic because "No character can aspire to realism without a few all-too-human flaws."

Although she is wise beyond her years, Lisa has typical childhood issues, sometimes requiring adult intervention. One episode to show this is "See Homer Run" (season seventeen, 2005) where she goes through a developmental condition which causes her to get into trouble at school. In "Lost Our Lisa" (season nine, 1998), she tricks Homer into allowing her to ride the bus alone, only to become hopelessly lost and in need of aid from her father. Chris Turner writes in Planet Simpson that incidents like this illustrate that "Even when Lisa's lecturing like a college professor or mounting yet another protest, she never becomes a full-grown adult trapped in a child's body." In The Simpsons and Philosophy: The D'oh! of Homer, Aeon J. Skoble states that although Lisa is an intellectual, she is still portrayed as a character who enjoys normal childhood and girl activities, plays with Malibu Stacy dolls, loves ponies, obsesses over teenage heartthrobs such as Corey, and watches The Itchy & Scratchy Show along with Bart. He writes, "One might argue that this is typical childhood behavior, but since in so many cases Lisa is presented not simply as a prodigy but as preternaturally wise, the fondness for Itchy & Scratchy and Corey seem to be highlighted, taking on greater significance. Lisa is portrayed as the avatar of logic and wisdom, but then she also worships Corey so she's 'no better [than the rest of us]'." Lisa occasionally worries that her family's dull habits will rub off on her, such as in "Lisa the Simpson" (season nine, 1998) she worries that the "Simpson gene" will make her a dimwit later finding out the gene only goes through the male side.

She is also concerned that Maggie may grow up to be like the rest of the family and tries to teach her complex ideas. Chris Turner writes in Planet Simpson that "Lisa embarks on quests to find solace for her yearning spirit ... but the most reliable source of truth she finds is the one she always believed in: her family. It is from the other Simpsons that Lisa draws stability, meaning, contentment." Her loyalty to her family is most clearly seen in the flashforward "Lisa's Wedding" (season six, 1995), in which she must reconcile her love for them with the distaste of her cultured fiancé. In the episode "Mother Simpson" (season seven, 1995) she meets her paternal grandmother Mona Simpson for the first time. Mona is also well-read and articulate, and the writers used the character as a way to explain the origins of Lisa's intelligence.

=== Sexuality ===
Lisa's sexuality has become the subject of speculation amongst viewers of the show. Lisa is shown to have heterosexual crushes on Nelson Muntz and Langdon Alger in "Lisa's Date with Density" and "Bart on the Road" respectively. In some episodes Lisa is shown to have a boyfriend, such as Edmund Dracula in "Treehouse of Horror XXI" or Colin in "The Simpsons Movie". Lisa becomes engaged to, and later almost marries, Hugh Parkfield in "Lisa's Wedding" and the episode "Holidays of Future Passed" suggests that Lisa will go on to marry Milhouse Van Houten. However, "Holidays of Future Passed" also show Lisa being in both a monogamous, and later polyamorous, lesbian relationships.

Although Lisa's sexuality has never been confirmed on screen, showrunner Al Jean said in a 2019 interview with The Metro that he had always envisaged for Lisa to grow up to become polyamorous. In a 2020 interview with the Stryker & Klein show on KROQ Radio, Yeardley Smith said that she believed that Lisa was "still exploring her sexuality". Smith also asked fans to stop speculating on Lisa's sexuality, as she was "ultimately an eight-year old girl".

== Reception ==
=== Commendations ===
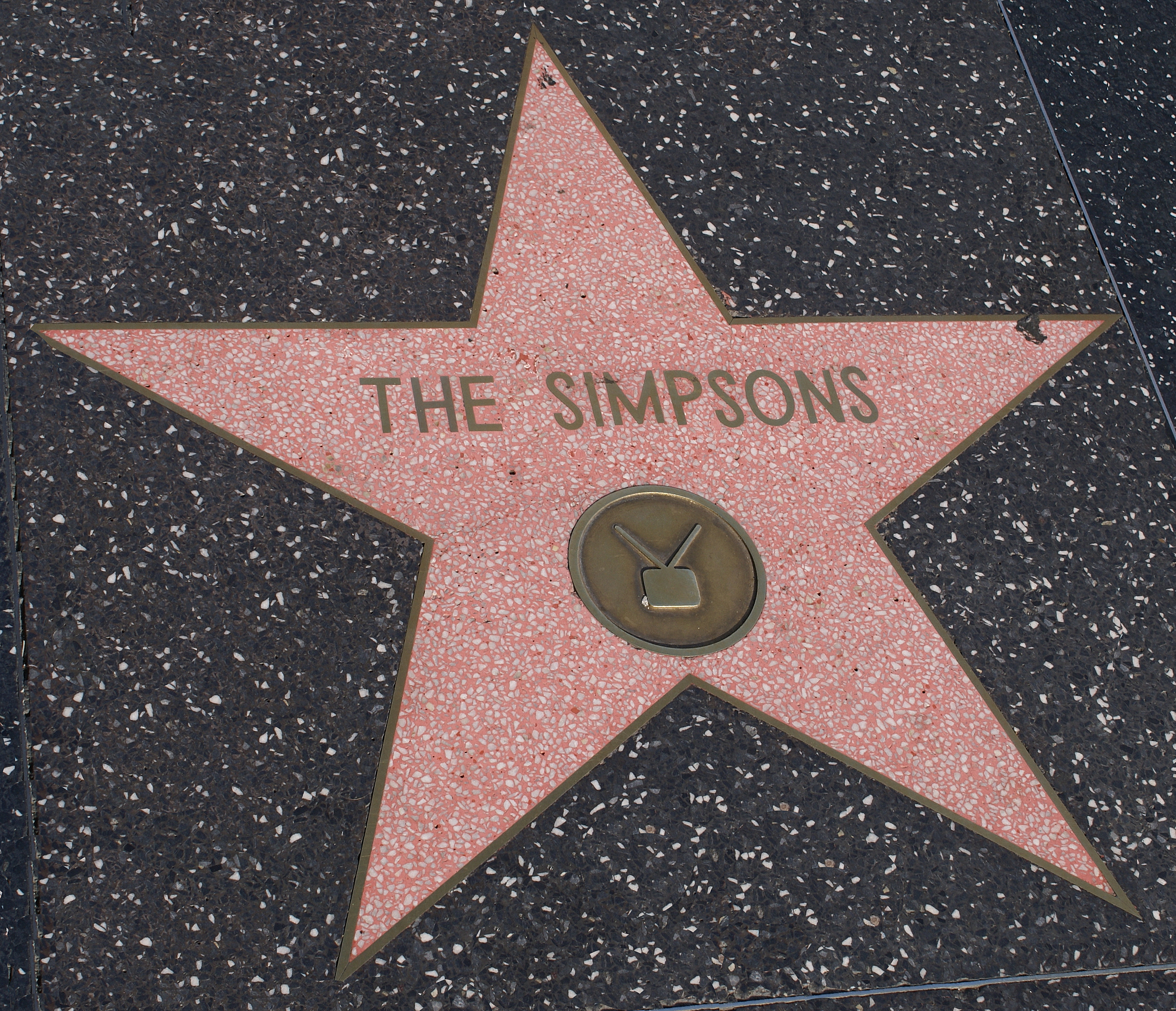
In 2000, Lisa, along with the rest of the Simpson family, was awarded a star on the Hollywood Walk of Fame

Lisa has been a popular character since the show's inception. She was listed at number 11 (tied with Bart) in TV Guide's "Top 50 Greatest Cartoon Characters of All Time." She appeared in Comcast's list of TV's Most Intriguing Characters and was also included in AfterEllen.com's Top 50 Favorite Female TV Characters. On a less positive note, she was ranked third in AskMen's top 10 of the most irritating '90s cartoon characters. Yeardley Smith has won several awards for voicing Lisa, including a Primetime Emmy Award for "Outstanding Voice-Over Performance" in 1992 for "Lisa the Greek". Various episodes in which Lisa stars have won Emmy Awards for Outstanding Animated Program, including "Homer vs. Lisa and the 8th Commandment" in 1991, "Lisa's Wedding" in 1995 and "HOMR" in 2001. In 2000, Lisa and the rest of the Simpson family were awarded a star on the Hollywood Walk of Fame at 7021 Hollywood Boulevard.

Lisa's environmentalism has been especially well received. In 2001, Lisa received a special "board of directors Ongoing Commitment Award" at the Environmental Media Awards. "Lisa the Vegetarian" won both an Environmental Media Award for "Best Television Episodic Comedy" and a Genesis Award for "Best Television Comedy Series, Ongoing Commitment". Several other episodes that feature Lisa speaking out in favor of animal rights have won Genesis Awards, including "Whacking Day" in 1994, "Bart Gets an Elephant" in 1995, "Million Dollar Abie" in 2007 and "Apocalypse Cow" in 2009.

=== Cultural influence ===
Jonathan Gray, author of the book Watching The Simpsons, feels that Lisa "is probably the best and certainly longest-running feminist character that television has had. She's the heart of the show and she quite often questions gender politics." Christopher Borrelli of The Toledo Blade wrote, "Has there ever been a female TV character as complex, intelligent, and, ahem, as emotionally well-drawn as Lisa Simpson? Meet her once and she comes off priggish and one-note – a know-it-all. Get to know her and Lisa is as well-rounded as anyone you may ever meet in the real world."

According to PETA, Lisa was one of the first vegetarian characters on primetime television. In 2004 the organization included Lisa on its list of the "Most Animal-Friendly TV Characters of All Time". In 2008, environmentalist website The Daily Green honored Lisa's role in The Simpsons Movie with one of its inaugural "Heart of Green" awards, which "recognize those who have helped green go mainstream." They wrote "young Lisa Simpson has inspired a generation to wear their hearts on their sleeves and get educated, and involved, about global issues, from justice to feminism and the environment." Japanese broadcasters reversed viewer dislike of the series by focusing marketing of the show on Lisa. Lisa's well-intended but ill-fated struggles to be a voice of reason and a force of good in her family and community struck a chord with Japanese audiences. Mario D'Amato, a specialist in Buddhist studies at Rollins College in Florida, described Lisa as "open-minded, reflective, ethical, and interested in improving herself in various ways, while still preserving a childlike sense of innocence. These are all excellent qualities, ones which are espoused by many Buddhist traditions."

Lisa and the rest of the Simpsons have had a significant influence on English-language idioms. The dismissive term "meh"—used by Lisa and popularized by the show— entered the Collins English Dictionary in 2008. In 1996, The New York Times published an article saying that Lisa was inspiring children, especially young girls, to learn to play the saxophone.

Lisa Simpson was mentioned at the 2018 Conservative Political Action Conference when Senator Ted Cruz called the Democratic Party "The Party of Lisa Simpson", as opposed to the Republican Party being the party of several other family members.

=== Merchandising ===
Lisa has been included in many The Simpsons publications, toys, and other merchandise. The Lisa Book, describing Lisa's personality and attributes, was released in 2006. Other merchandise includes dolls, posters, figurines, bobblehead dolls, mugs, and clothing such as slippers, T-shirts, baseball caps, and boxer shorts. Lisa has appeared in commercials for Burger King, C.C. Lemon, Church's Chicken, Domino's Pizza, Kentucky Fried Chicken, Ramada Inn, Ritz Crackers, Subway and Butterfinger.

On April 9, 2009, the United States Postal Service unveiled a series of five 44-cent stamps featuring Lisa and the four other members of the nuclear Simpson family. They are the first characters from a television series to receive this recognition while still in production. The stamps, designed by Matt Groening, went on sale in May 2009.

Lisa has also appeared in other media relating to The Simpsons. She has appeared in each Simpsons video game, including The Simpsons Game, released in 2007. In addition to the television series, Lisa regularly appeared in issues of Simpsons Comics, which were published from 1993 until 2018. The comics focus on the sweeter, more naïve incarnation from the early seasons. Lisa also plays a role in The Simpsons Ride, launched in 2008 at Universal Studios Florida and Hollywood.
