= Heartbreakers (2001 film) =

2001 comedy film by David Mirkin

- Theatrical release poster
- Directed by: David Mirkin
- Written by: Robert Dunn; Paul Guay; Stephen Mazur
- Produced by: John Davis; Irving Ong
- Starring: Sigourney Weaver; Jennifer Love Hewitt; Ray Liotta; Jason Lee; Jeffrey Jones; Gene Hackman
- Cinematography: Dean Semler
- Edited by: William Steinkamp
- Music by: John Debney; Danny Elfman
- Production companies: Metro-Goldwyn-Mayer Pictures; Davis Entertainment Company
- Distributed by: MGM Distribution Co. (United States/Canada); Winchester Films (International)
- Release date: March 23, 2001 (United States)
- Running time: 123 minutes
- Country: United States
- Language: English
- Budget: $35–38 million
- Box office: $57.8 million

Heartbreakers is a 2001 American romantic crime comedy film directed by David Mirkin and written by Robert Dunn, Paul Guay, and Stephen Mazur. The film stars Sigourney Weaver, Jennifer Love Hewitt, Ray Liotta, Jason Lee, and Gene Hackman. It marks the last onscreen film appearance of Anne Bancroft before her death in June 2005. Heartbreakers received mixed reviews from critics, and grossed over $57 million. Weaver was nominated for a Satellite Award for her performance in the film.

== Plot ==
Max and Page Conners are a mother-daughter con artist team. When the film opens, the Conners are finishing a con on Dean Cumanno, an auto-body shop owner and small-time crook from New Jersey. The con, which the Conners have played many times before on other men, involves Max marrying Dean, passing out on their wedding night to avoid consummating the marriage, and then Page (posing as Dean's secretary) luring Dean into a compromising position to justify Max's immediate divorce and hefty settlement. The con is a success.

Page declares that she wants to go solo. Max initially relents, but when they go to the bank to split their earnings, they are confronted by an IRS agent who declares that they owe the government a considerable sum on top of the rest of their savings, which have already been seized. Page reluctantly agrees to work one last con with Max in Palm Beach, to get enough money to pay off the IRS and set Page up to work on her own. For their target, they choose widower William B. Tensy, a tobacco tycoon who is addicted to his own product.

While working the main con with Tensy, Page attempts a side con without her mother's knowledge. Page targets beachfront bartender Jack, who is worth $3 million; she tells him that her name is Jane, but develops genuine feelings for him. Max learns of the side con and tells Page to break the relationship off, which Page does reluctantly.

Tensy proposes to Max ahead of schedule, but before they can get married, he accidentally chokes and dies while trying to initiate sex with Max. While Max and Page are deciding what to do with the body, Dean arrives, having tracked Max down to apologize and propose to her again. Dean figures out that Max and Page conned him, and threatens to call the authorities. Max offers to return Dean's divorce settlement money if he will help them make Tensy's death look like an accident. Max tells Page that their money was never really taken by the IRS; the agent was Max's mentor, Barbara, who agreed to help prevent Page from leaving. However, when Max, Page and Dean go to the bank, the money really is gone, having been liquidated in a double cross by Barbara.

In order to help Max, Page returns to Jack and accepts his proposal, planning to work it as a regular con. Page insists that Jack will not cheat on her, but is heartbroken when, on their wedding night, she breaks into her mother's room and finds him in a compromising position with Max. After the divorce settlement is paid, Dean confronts Max about the ethics of their con, pointing out that even a "goody-goody" like Jack is only human. Max reveals that Jack actually turned her down and that she had to drug him, but she defends her actions by saying that Jack would hurt Page eventually. Dean counters that Max has no right to keep Page from the man she loves because of what "might" happen.

Chastened, Max tells Page the truth, admitting that her efforts to protect her daughter have only hurt her in other ways. Page returns to Jack and both reconcile, giving him back the bar he had sold to pay the settlement, and tells him her real name. Max and Dean also get together, Dean having admitted that he still loves Max despite what she put him through. The final shot of the film is of Dean — using the name 'Stanley' — romancing Barbara, with Max watching them via binoculars, implying that Max and Dean are now working together to get Max's money back from Barbara.

== Cast ==
- Sigourney Weaver as Max Conners/Ulga Yevanova/Angela Nardino, a con artist.
- Jennifer Love Hewitt as Page Conners/Wendy/Jane Helstrom, Max's daughter and partner in crime.
- Gene Hackman as William B. Tensy, a cigarette empire billionaire.
- Ray Liotta as Dean Cumanno/Vinny Staggliano, Max's love interest.
- Jason Lee as Jack Withrowe, Page's love interest.
- Anne Bancroft as Gloria Vogal / Barbara, Max's longtime friend and mentor in the con game.
- Nora Dunn as Miss Madress, Tensy's housekeeper.
- Sarah Silverman as Linda, Jack's friend and employee.
- Zach Galifianakis as Bill, Jack's friend and employee.
- Julio Oscar Mechoso as Leo, Dean's friend and employee.
- Ricky Jay as Dawson's Auctioneer
- Michael Hitchcock as Dr. Arnold Davis
- Carrie Fisher as Ms. Surpin, Max's divorce attorney.
- Jeffrey Jones as Mr. Appel, a hotel manager in Palm Beach.
- Patricia Belcher as an unnamed hotel maid.
- Elya Baskin as Vladimir, a waiter at a Russian restaurant.
- David Mirkin as Jack's Lawyer (director's cameo)
- Kevin Nealon as Man at the bar

== Production ==
The film was set in Palm Beach, Florida. Filming started in and around Los Angeles in late April 2000. By June 2000, filming moved to South Florida for sequences shot in Palm Beach, Miami and Florida Keys. Locations included The Breakers, The Glades, and Worth Avenue. According to the DVD commentary by director David Mirkin, only a few external shots were actually shot in Palm Beach, with the rest utilizing Los Angeles area locations as stand-ins. The film contains several references to The Beatles, including Sigourney Weaver singing a Russian folk version of "Back in the U.S.S.R." and the use of John Lennon's "Oh My Love" in several key scenes.

== Soundtrack ==
John Debney composed the score, while Danny Elfman composed the Heartbreakers theme.

== Release ==
The film opened at #1 in the U.S. box-office, earning $12.3 million on its opening weekend. It went on to gross a total of $57,756,408 worldwide.

== Reception ==
Heartbreakers received mixed reviews from critics upon release. Roger Ebert gave the film three stars out of four and said that, "it does what a comedy must: It makes us laugh." A. O. Scott of The New York Times gave a glowing review of the film, stating that:

At a time when most comedies go for your wallet with a kick in the groin and a blackjack to the back of the head, this one, though it has some blunt instruments in its bag of tricks, has the class and professionalism to perpetrate an honest and sophisticated con.

On Rotten Tomatoes, 55% of 126 critic reviews are positive. The "critics consensus" on the website states, "Though the actors pour a lot of energy into their roles, Heartbreakers is too drawn out, and the romantic subplot doesn't blend well. Also, the con women aren't particularly sympathetic." On Metacritic, the film has a score of 47 out of 100, based on reviews from 32 critics, indicating "mixed or average" reviews. Audiences surveyed by CinemaScore gave the film a grade of B− on scale of A to F.

== Accolades ==
Award	Category	Recipient(s)	Result
2001 Teen Choice Awards	Film - Choice Actress	Jennifer Love Hewitt	Nominated
2001 Stinkers Bad Movie Awards	Most Annoying Fake Accent: Female	Sigourney Weaver	Nominated
2001 Golden Schmoes Awards	Best T&A of the Year	Jennifer Love Hewitt	Nominated
2002 Satellite Awards	Best Performance by an Actress in a Motion Picture, Comedy or Musical	Sigourney Weaver	Nominated

== Home media ==
The film was released on VHS and DVD on October 2, 2001. The film was released on Blu-ray on November 24, 2015.
