= The Simpsons: An Uncensored, Unauthorized History =

2009 non-fiction book by John Ortved

- American cover art
- Author: John Ortved
- Cover artist: Charlotte Strick
- Language: English
- Subject: The Simpsons
- Genre: Non-fiction
- Publisher: Faber and Faber
- Publication date: October 2009
- Publication place: United States
- Media type: Hard cover
- Pages: 352
- ISBN: 0-86547-988-7

The Simpsons: An Uncensored, Unauthorized History is a non-fiction book about the American animated television series The Simpsons. It was written by John Ortved, and first published in October 2009 by Faber and Faber. In the United Kingdom, the book is called Simpsons Confidential: The uncensored, totally unauthorised history of the world's greatest TV show by the people that made it. The book is an oral history of the show, and concentrates particularly on the writers and producers of the show. The book includes entire chapters devoted to key figures such as creator Matt Groening and James L. Brooks and Sam Simon, who helped develop the series. According to National Public Radio reviewer Linda Holmes, "Ortved's thesis, essentially, is that lots of people are responsible for the success of The Simpsons, and their creator, Matt Groening, has too often been viewed as the sole source to the detriment of others who also deserve to be praised."

In 2007, John Ortved wrote an article for Vanity Fair titled "Simpson Family Values". Producers of the show, including Groening, Brooks and Simon, chose not to cooperate in the project. Ortved believes that the reason was because they "were upset [that] the myth of The Simpsons would be challenged." Shortly after the article was published, an agent suggested that Ortved write a full book. The producers again decided not to participate, and, according to Ortved, Brooks asked current and former Simpsons employees not to talk to Ortved. However, the book does include portions of interviews that several figures did with other sources. Ortved did interview a number of sources for the book, including Hank Azaria, a cast member of the show since the second season, Fox Broadcasting Company owner Rupert Murdoch and former writer Conan O'Brien.

Reviews of the book were mostly positive, with most reviewers commenting that the book was well researched and provided a solid history of the show. A few critics felt that the final chapters, in which Ortved gives his opinion of the current state of the show, were out of place and did not fit in with the rest of the book.

== Background ==
In 2007, John Ortved wrote an article for Vanity Fair titled "Simpson Family Values". It was an oral history of The Simpsons, featuring interviews with several of the crew and cast members. According to Ortved, the producers of The Simpsons decided not to cooperate and be interviewed for the project because they had heard that he was asking questions about Sam Simon. Simon, one of the first executive producers of the show, had left after the fourth season after clashing with creator Matt Groening and executive producer James L. Brooks. Ortved believes that the producers "were upset [that] the myth of The Simpsons would be challenged." He still wrote the story, without the approval of the Simpsons producers.

Shortly after the article was published, an agent suggested that Ortved write a full book. They put together a proposal and shopped it to several publishers, before being signed by Faber and Faber. According to Ortved, "When word of this got out, Brooks sent a letter to every current Simpsons employee, and all the former ones he thought mattered, asking them not to speak to me. The writers’ agents sent denial after denial for interview requests and eventually stopped responding altogether." He added, "There was one 'D'oh!' in James L. Brooks and the Gracie Films master plan: Many people don’t like James L. Brooks. [...] The book I ended up writing quotes more than 75 sources—some of them Simpsons staffers, former and current, who opened up because they considered his and Matt Groening’s attempt to stomp on my project very 'un-Simpsons.'"

Ortved decided to write the book as an oral history because he found that every person interviewed had a different perspective on the events. His decision was "reinforced" when he found out that the producers of the show would not cooperate.

== Content ==
The Simpsons did not spring out of one man's brain, fully formed, like a hilarious Athena. Its inception was a process, and it has more than one parent (as well as stepparents, grandparents, creepy uncles, and ungrateful children).

— John Ortved

According to National Public Radio reviewer Linda Holmes, "Ortved's thesis, essentially, is that lots of people are responsible for the success of The Simpsons, and their creator, Matt Groening, has too often been viewed as the sole source to the detriment of others who also deserve to be praised." The Simpsons: An Uncensored, Unauthorized History is an oral history of the show, examining its beginnings, rise to success, impact on pop culture, as well as the people behind the show, including the animators, writers and producers. The content consists mostly of quotations from various figures, which are tied together by comments from Ortved. The book includes entire chapters devoted to key figures such as Matt Groening, James L. Brooks, Sam Simon and Conan O'Brien. The book's foreword was written by Canadian author Douglas Coupland. The final chapters of the book consist mostly of commentary from Ortved, in which he states that he believes that quality of the show has declined since its early years.

=== Interviews ===
Ortved interviewed a number of sources for the book, including main cast member Hank Azaria, former director Brad Bird, former supervising director Gábor Csupó and former writer O'Brien. Groening, Brooks and Simon refused to participate in the book, or be interviewed by Ortved. However, the book does include portions of interviews that they did with other sources. According to Ortved, most of the participants "had stories to tell, or axes to grind," or are "too successful to care." Research and interviews for both the book and Vanity Fair article were conducted between January 2007 and May 2008. Ortved commented that the person he most would have liked to interview was Dan Castellaneta, the voice of Homer Simpson. Rupert Murdoch, the owner of the Fox Broadcasting Company, agreed to be interviewed, and reportedly told Ortved "Those creative types, they're always looking to pick a fight." He also interviewed figures such as Fox CEO Barry Diller and guest stars Ricky Gervais, Art Spiegelman and Tom Wolfe.

== Reception ==
Reviews of the book were mostly positive. Linda Holmes of National Public Radio felt that "most of Ortved's work provides a solid basic history." Ken Tucker of Entertainment Weekly gave the book a "B+", writing, "you have to admire all the work that went into this unauthorized history." He noted that he "felt a little bad afterward for the central players who got sucker punched. [...] The subsequent testimony about the empire Groening created is contentious and mesmerizing. It's also conflicting and compromised, since some of the biggest fishies of all did not talk to Ortved. [...] The reader should be wary when sources assert that Groening is little more than an affable frontman for the show or that Brooks sometimes wielded his power imperiously: The guys aren't there to defend themselves. In most cases, though, Ortved amasses quotes from many sources to establish such points, so the negative stuff doesn't seem gratuitous." Michael C. Lorah of Newsarama described the book as a "very effective, very worthwhile read" but felt that Ortved's "editorializing" was "probably the most distracting element of the book." Michael Hingston of See Magazine called the book "a well-told patchwork that shines formidable light on the show" and gave it three and a half stars. However, he felt the book was released prematurely and should have been published after the end of the show, also criticizing Ortved's narration and the lack of quotes from Matt Groening or James L. Brooks. Kyle Ryan of The A.V. Club pointed out that the book has "numerous factual errors" that "may only trip the alarms of hardcore fans, but even casual readers may be put off by the book's redundancy." He concluded that despite flaws, the "insight into its routines and eccentric personalities can't help but fascinate."

Ryan Bigge of The Toronto Star felt that Ortved's "diligence and research is faultless, and [he] has worked hard to avoid writing another insider-y true-fans-only look at the show. Still, certain chunks of the book are unlikely to appeal to casual Simpsons viewers. [..] By mixing journalism about yellow people with a bit of yellow journalism, Ortved provides a tough, necessary look at Homer Simpson's odyssey that would make Kent Brockman proud."

Bryan Appleyard of The Sunday Times criticized the format of the book, writing that it was "alternately engrossing and infuriating book [...] It is infuriating because of a fatal structural decision taken by the author and/or his publisher to include long quotations from interviewees as breaks in the text. This destroys narrative coherence and, for much of the time, makes reading a chore." Appleyard concluded that it is "an important and controversial contribution to the ever-expanding scope of Simpsons studies."

Several critics felt that the final chapters, in which Ortved gives his opinion of the current state of the show, were out of place when compared with the rest of the book. Ken Tucker felt Ortved's "complaints aren't original or illuminating." Linda Holmes wrote that "After spending most of the book using actual reporting to flesh out the facts, Ortved largely turns the floor over to himself for the part of the book in which he describes the creative decline of the show and tries to figure out whose fault it is by not infrequently simply declaring, among other things, which episodes are good and which are bad, sometimes without explaining himself at all." Michael C. Lorah felt that Ortved's criticism of the later seasons was "disconcerting", noting that "It's not that he's wrong, but it seems unnecessary and at times even petty when cast against his own fawning over the undeniably massive influence of the show on current pop culture and comedy."

== Other editions ==
Nation	Title	Publisher	First published	Pages	ISBN	Ref.
Canada	The Simpsons: An Uncensored, Unauthorized History	Greystone Books	October 2009	332	978-1-55365-503-9	
United Kingdom	Simpsons Confidential	Ebury Press	October 15, 2009	320	0091927293	
