= Losing My Virginity =

1998 autobiography by Richard Branson

- Cover
- Author: Richard Branson
- Language: English
- Subject: Autobiography
- Publisher: Virgin Books
- Publication place: England

Losing My Virginity is the autobiography of the British businessman Richard Branson. Published in 1998, it was later followed by other biographical books by Branson, including Business Stripped Bare: Adventures of a Global Entrepreneur (2008) and The Virgin Way: How to Listen, Learn, Laugh and Lead (2014).

== Content ==
Losing my Virginity is dedicated to "Alex Ritchie and his family" and a note before the prologue thanks Edward Whitley who helped Branson with the writing of the book. The prologue of the book recounts the start of a round-the-world balloon trip over the Atlas Mountains in Morocco, and is followed by 28 chapters in which Branson recounts the first 43 years of his life. The book ends in January 1993, in the wake of Virgin Atlantic's victory in their court case against British Airways. An epilogue briefly details events since 1993 including the launch of Virgin Cola, the financial services company Virgin Direct and Branson's charitable bid to run the United Kingdom's National Lottery.

== Publication history ==
A paperback version (ISBN 0-7535-1020-0) was released in 2002. An updated edition was released in 2005 in hardback and paperback expressing Branson's views on 9/11 and how it has affected his business, especially his airline Virgin Atlantic.

The book was serialized in The Sun and The Times.

== Reception ==
Losing My Virginity was positively reviewed by Tom Fawcett writing for CNN in 1999. Fawcett wrote that "...Branson offers a fascinating autobiography of a man who succeeded by taking huge risks, proving that the established way is not the only way." and that "The strength of Losing my Virginity is Branson's modesty and honesty. ...Often criticized by the media for being a showman, Branson reasons that he only used his personality to help gain exposure for Virgin. Surprisingly, Branson comes off as a lovable underdog battling the establishment, instead of a spoiled tycoon. In the introduction, Branson explains that Losing My Virginity is Volume One of his autobiography, which takes him up to his early 40s. How Branson will reinvent middle-age and retirement should make for a compelling sequel".

== Rumoured adaptation ==
In October 2010, it was reported by Variety that Losing my Virginity was being adapted into a biopic by David Mirkin, who would write, direct and co-produce the film with Steven Paul.

== Bibliography ==
- "Losing My Virginity", Virgin Books, Retrieved on September 14, 2010.
