= Kent Brockman =

Fictional character from The Simpsons franchise

- The Simpsons character
- First appearance: "Krusty Gets Busted"(1990)
- Created by: Matt Groening
- Designed by: Brad Bird
- Voiced by: Harry Shearer

In-universe information
- Full name: Brock Kentman
- Gender: Male
- Occupation: News anchor
- Family: Unnamed sister
- Spouse: Stephanie (wife)
- Children: Unnamed adult daughter Brittany (daughter)
- Relatives: Unnamed nephew

Kent Brockman is a recurring fictional character in the animated television series The Simpsons. He is voiced by Harry Shearer and first appeared in the episode "Krusty Gets Busted." He is the grumpy, self-centered, pompous news anchor for the local Springfield news.

== Profile ==
Kent Brockman hosts the Channel 6 weekday news, as well as Smartline, a local current-affairs program (a parody of the national current-affairs program Nightline), Bite Back! With Kent Brockman (a parody of Fight Back! with David Horowitz), Eye on Springfield (a parody of Eye on LA), which focuses mostly on Springfield's entertainment news, the game show Springfield Squares, Springfield Action News, and has his own personal commentary segment of the 6:00 p.m. news, "My Two Cents". In the episode "The Mansion Family", he co-hosted an award show with pop music singer Britney Spears.

It has been hinted that Brockman is ethnically Jewish, having changed his surname from Brockelstein; this was first indicated in a 1960s flashback featured in the episode "Mother Simpson", in which Brockman was known as Kenny Brockelstein early in his career. He can sometimes be spotted wearing the Hebrew Chai symbol on a necklace. However, he is seen several times attending Reverend Lovejoy's Protestant church, and in "Marge on the Lam" he states his belief in the Book of Revelation, suggesting he professes Christian religious beliefs.

Brockman has a daughter, Brittany, who may have been the product of his fling with the Channel 6 weather girl. He also has a wife named Stephanie. In "Kamp Krusty", Brockman is revealed to have during his career, reported on the Vietnam War, the 1979–89 Soviet–Afghan War, and the 1991 Gulf War.

In "Dog of Death", Brockman won the multimillion-dollar ($130 million) state lottery jackpot and left the news desk while still on the air. However, he remained a news anchor because he was under contract, though he also admitted that he likes making $500,000 a year. He has an ongoing feud with traffic reporter Arnie Pye, and has been shown to criticize Pye's reporting and also even chuckles when it was thought Pye had died in a helicopter accident. When Arnie Pye took Brockman's anchor position he admitted on the air he made out with Brockman's daughter but was sure to note it was with "the grown up one", thus revealing Brockman has an adult daughter.

Brockman's penchant for using offensive language worked against him in the 400th episode, "You Kent Always Say What You Want", where, after Homer accidentally spilled coffee on Brockman's crotch, he shouted what Ned Flanders called a "super swear" that shocked everyone who watches it. Brockman was demoted to weather man due to the station paying a fine to the Federal Communications Commission (FCC) and was soon fired when the network executives deliberately mistook a ring of Splenda in Brockman's coffee for cocaine. Brockman was later given his job back to silence him (after doing an exposé that was seen on YouTube uncovering the real reason the FCC is cracking down on obscenity in the media), with a 50% raise, making his new salary $750,000 a year.

== Creation and inspirations ==
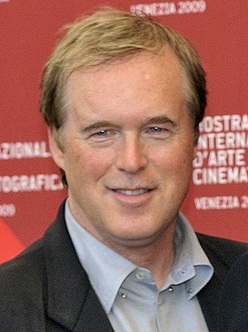
Brad Bird designed Brockman.

Kent Brockman first appeared on television in the first season episode "Krusty Gets Busted", which originally aired April 29, 1990. The character was based on Los Angeles anchormen Hal Fishman and Jerry Dunphy. The director of "Krusty Gets Busted", Brad Bird, designed the character and modeled him after anchorman Ted Koppel. Another influence on the character was The Mary Tyler Moore Show's Ted Baxter, played by Ted Knight. Dunphy was proud of the fact that Brockman was based on him and would tell people that he was Kent Brockman.

== Cultural influence ==
Brockman is responsible for popularizing the snowclone "I, for one, welcome our new [fill-in-the-blank] overlords", sometimes used to express mock submission, usually for the purpose of humor. Brockman's comment about believing a spacecraft was taken over by a master race of giant space ants in "Deep Space Homer" (1994), which generated the meme, is considered one of the show's classic moments. The spacecraft was carrying an ant colony, though the insects were accidentally released by Homer. This led to an ant drifting by the video feed, appearing gigantic due to its proximity to the camera, at which point Brockman contemplates if the "master race of giant space ants ... will consume the captive earth men or merely enslave them" and eventually utters the line "And I, for one, welcome our new insect overlords". Author Chris Turner called it "perhaps his finest hour as a journalist" and said the scene is "simply among the finest comedic moments in the history of television."

Variations of the phrase have been used in the media, such as New Scientist magazine, the Houston Chronicle and Ken Jennings on the Jeopardy! IBM Challenge (versus Watson) on February 16, 2011. On May 6, 2014, Stephen Colbert made direct reference to the phrase by using it as the closing line of his television program The Colbert Report.

== Reception ==
The author of the book Planet Simpson: How a Cartoon Masterpiece Documented an Era and Defined a Generation, Chris Turner, said that "if the institution of the News has a single iconic face on The Simpsons, it's Brockman's" and that "in Brockman's journalism, we see some of the modern news media's ugliest biases", which he identifies as glibness, amplification, and sensationalism. MSN called Brockman one of the worst TV news anchors.

"You Kent Always Say What You Want" was well received by critics. IGN called it the second best episode of the season.

== Merchandise ==
Playmates Toys created a Kent Brockman action figure for its World of Springfield toy line which was released in July 2001.

== See also ==
- Media in The Simpsons
