= Planet Simpson =

2004 book by Chris Turner

- Cover of Planet Simpson (1st United States ed.)
- Author: Chris Turner
- Language: English
- Subject: The Simpsons
- Genre: Non-fiction
- Published: 2004 (Random House Canada)
- Publication place: Canada
- Media type: Print
- Pages: 466 pp.
- ISBN: 0-679-31318-4
- OCLC: 55682258

Planet Simpson: How a Cartoon Masterpiece Documented an Era and Defined a Generation, also abbreviated to Planet Simpson: How a Cartoon Masterpiece Defined a Generation, is a non-fiction book about The Simpsons, written by Chris Turner and originally published on October 12, 2004, by Random House. The book is partly a memoir and an exploration of the impact The Simpsons has had on popular culture.

== Background ==
Planet Simpson was written by Canadian author Chris Turner, who is a big fan of The Simpsons, although "not even the biggest fan I know personally ... I think I am actually a pretty average hardcore fan. What I brought to it was a sense that because the show is as well put together as it is, it really offers a wide lens for looking at culture generally." Turner notes: "I can count on The Simpsons to provide me with a solid thirty minutes of truth, of righteous anger, of hypocrisies deflated and injustices revealed, of belly laughter and joy. It is food for my soul. Seriously. I think many Simpsons fans would agree. And that, as far as I'm concerned, makes it a kind of religion," he explains in the book. He had previously written an essay during his time at Shift entitled "The Simpsons Generation", which was syndicated across North America. Turner wrote Planet Simpson because there had not been a book that had looked at the "genesis, past, characters and influence" of the show, only official episode guides or academic pieces.

Planet Simpson examines the show's satirical humor and its impact on pop culture. It also looks at numerous episodes of the show.

It features a foreword by Douglas Coupland.

=== Chapters ===
- Foreword by Douglas Coupland
- Introduction: The Birth of the Simpsonian Institution
- Chapter 1: The Life & Times of The Simpsons
  - A brief history of the show, its creation, its writers and a study of its various styles of humour. Also details the shows descendants and its "ancestors".
- Chapter 2: Homer's Odyssey
  - Focuses on Homer Simpson, extended mention of Frank Grimes.
- Chapter 3: Bart Simpson, Punk icon
  - Focuses on Bart Simpson, extended mention of Sideshow Bob, Krusty, and Principal Skinner.
- Chapter 4: Citizen Burns
  - Focuses on Mr. Burns, extended mention of Jack Larson, Reverend Lovejoy, Lindsey Naegle, Mayor Quimby, Waylon Smithers, Squeaky Voiced Teen, Chief Wiggum, and Wiseguy.
- Chapter 5: Lisa Lionheart
  - Focuses on Lisa Simpson.
- Chapter 6: Marge Knows Best
  - Focuses on Marge Simpson, extended mention of Ned Flanders and Grampa Simpson.
- Chapter 7: The Simpsons in Cyberspace
  - Focuses on the Internet and its influences in the show and the shows influence on the Internet, extended mention of Comic Book Guy.
- Chapter 8: The Ugly Springfieldianite
  - Focuses on The Simpsons in the United States and abroad, extended mention of Apu and Groundskeeper Willie.
- Chapter 9: The Simpsons Go Hollywood
  - Focuses on the shows take on Hollywood, celebrities and the shows many guest stars, extended mention of Kent Brockman, Krusty, Troy McClure, and Rainier Wolfcastle.
- Chapter 10: The Simpsons Through the Looking Glass
  - Focuses on the shows take on pop culture.
- Chapter 11: Planet Simpson
  - The conclusion of the book.

== Top 5 episodes ==
The end of the first chapter includes a look at the author's Top 5 episodes. Turner lists "Last Exit to Springfield" as his favourite episode. The other four episodes ordered by airdate: "Marge vs. the Monorail", "Rosebud", "Deep Space Homer" and "El Viaje Misterioso de Nuestro Jomer (The Mysterious Voyage of Homer)".

== Reception ==
Christopher Hirst of The Independent felt the book would largely appeal to fans of The Simpsons who would enjoy "Turner's critical intelligence and social awareness," while "non-fans will see 470 pages of geeky raving." He felt the book was "sui generis," and its "combination of motor-mouthed omniscience and voluminous footnotes is reminiscent of a certain style of highbrow writing about pop music." Curtis Gloade of The Record described the book as "almost 500 pages of this sort of meticulous, clear, and I believe, accurate rhetoric. It kept me nodding in agreement throughout. And laughing, too." He also wrote that he hopes people will not skip by the book at the bookstore because it is about The Simpsons and assume that it is "little more than a laugh-along-with-me book with lots of pictures and funny quotes." Gloade commented that this is "not the case. I laughed out loud regularly at the many Simpsons quotes, but that's only a small part of the total package." He concluded that Planet Simpson is an "enjoyable reading experience, one that will likely be matchless still for a long time because I highly doubt we'll see such a melding of a stellar pop culture icon (The Simpsons) and eloquent cultural critic (Turner) again for a long time." Kevin Jackson of The Times gave a largely negative review of the book. While feeling Turner's knowledge of the show was vast and finding much of the initial "less well-known aspects of Simpsonian pre-history" interesting, he overall felt the book was mostly "flimflam and filler" and criticised Turner's "gee-whiz prose and occasional lapses into plain old illiteracy" and ultimately failed to achieve the analytical goal Turner set: "It would take wit as keen and literary flair as supple as [the show's writers] to do justice to the show, and Turner is gifted with neither: he may think like Lisa, but he writes more like the Comic Book Guy."

== Editions ==
Publishing date	Title	Edition	Tag	Imprint	Cover's Extras	Length
September 9, 2004	Planet Simpson: How a Cartoon Masterpiece Documented an Era and Defined a Generation	1st	UK	Ebury Press	Introduction by Douglas Coupland; Power Screen Global Cult Pop Politics Music	472 pp.
October 7, 2004	Planet Simpson: How a Cartoon Masterpiece Defined a Generation	1st abridged	USA	HighBridge	The first audio to bring witty, opinionated, in-depth analysis to the longest-running sitcom of all time and the most important pop-cultural phenomenon of our generation. Abridged; 12 hours on 10 compact discs. Read by Oliver Wyman.	12 hours
October 12, 2004	Planet Simpson: How a Cartoon Masterpiece Documented an Era and Defined a Generation	1st (original)	CA	Random House Canada	Foreword by Douglas Coupland	466 pp.
October 12, 2004	Planet Simpson: How a Cartoon Masterpiece Defined a Generation	1st	USA	Da Capo Press	Foreword by Douglas Coupland author of Generation X	464 pp.
August 4, 2005	Planet Simpson: How a Cartoon Masterpiece Documented an Era and Defined a Generation	1st revised	UK	Ebury Press	Introduction by Douglas Coupland ‘This is a terrifically energetic book which, like its many-layered subject, will reward repeat consumption.’ THE GUARDIAN^{[A]}	480 pp.
October 18, 2005	Planet Simpson: How a Cartoon Masterpiece Defined a Generation	1st revised	USA	Da Capo Press	"Quite simply, the definitive book about The Simpsons."—Q	464 pp.
October 28, 2008	Planet Simpson: How a Cartoon Masterpiece Documented an Era and Defined a Generation	1st revised with addition	CA	Vintage Canada	Foreword by Douglas Coupland; With a new afterword by the author	576 pp.

A. Citation from article "Books previews: Saturday, 11 September 2004" (The Guardian).
