= Chris Turner (author) =

Canadian journalist and author (born 1973)

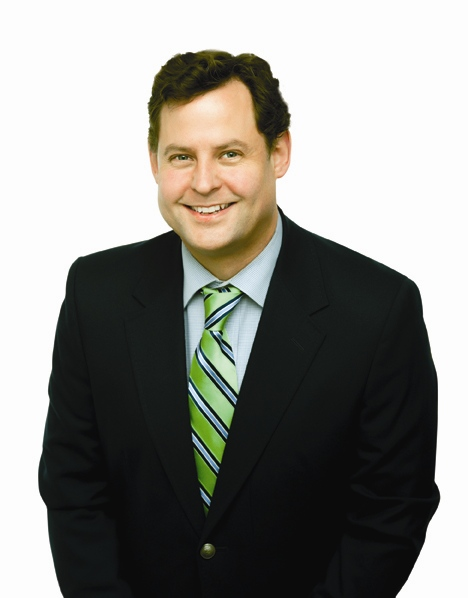
- Chris Turner
- Born: July 25, 1973 (age 53); Moose Jaw, Saskatchewan
- Education: Queen's University, Ryerson Polytechnic University
- Occupation: Writer
- Spouse: Ashley Bristowe
- Children: 2
- Writing career
- Language: English
- Website: www.theleapworks.com

Chris Turner (born July 25, 1973) is a Canadian journalist, speaker, and author.

== Biography ==
Turner was born in Moose Jaw, Saskatchewan, where his father, a fighter pilot, was stationed with the Canadian military. Turner's mother established the first family support centres at various Canadian military bases where the family was based. As a military brat, he lived in the Canadian North, the American Midwest, and Germany. He graduated from Queen's University, in Kingston, Ontario, in 1996 with an Honours Bachelor of Arts in History. During his undergraduate studies he won the Alexander MacLachlan Peace Prize, and the Michael R. G. Harris Memorial Scholarship. Turner also holds a journalism degree from Ryerson Polytechnic University, Toronto (1998). While at Ryerson, he completed an editorial internship at Shift magazine.

Following graduation from Ryerson, Turner reported on culture and technology for Shift from 1998 to 2003. His writing has also appeared in, The Walrus, The New Yorker, The Globe and Mail, The Independent, The Sunday Times, Time, The Guardian, Utne Reader, Adbusters and The South China Morning Post.

Turner was the recipient of a Fleck Fellowship at the Banff Centre in 2010. In 2009 he co-founded CivicCamp in Calgary. He was featured speaker for the Deakin Innovation Lectures in Melbourne, Australia, in 2008. He has given keynote addresses or lectures at thirteen university campuses, ten literary festivals and approximately sixty major professional and industrial conferences nationwide. In 2013 Turner was the writer-in-residence at Berton House in Dawson City, Yukon.

Turner lives in Nova Scotia, with his wife, the author and photographer Ashley Bristowe, and their children.

== Literary career ==
Turner's works include the bestselling Planet Simpson: How a Cartoon Masterpiece Documented an Era and Defined a Generation, published in 2004, and Geography of Hope: A Guided Tour of the World We Need, which was nominated for the Governor General's Literary Award and the National Business Book Award and was listed on the Globe and Mail's 2007 "Globe 100" list of the best books of the year.

Turner's magazine writing has earned him nine Canadian National Magazine Awards, including the 2001 President's Medal for General Excellence (the highest honour in Canadian magazine writing).

Chris Turner on Bookbits radio

=== Books ===
Books written by Turner include the following:

- How to Be a Climate Optimist: Blueprints for a Better World (Random House Canada, 2022)
- The Patch: The People, Pipelines and Politics of the Oilsands (Simon and Schuster, 2017)
- How to Breathe Underwater (Biblioasis, 2014)
- The War on Science (Greystone Books, 2013)
- The Leap: How to Survive and Thrive in the Sustainable Economy (Random House, 2011)
- The Best Canadian Essays 2010 (Tightrope Books, 2010; contributor)
- The Best Canadian Essays 2009 (Tightrope Books 2009; contributor)
- The Geography of Hope: A Tour of the World We Need (Random House, 2007)
- Planet Simpson: How a Cartoon Masterpiece Documented an Era and Defined a Generation (Random House 2004, revised ed. 2008)

=== Awards ===
In 2023 he won the Shaughnessy Cohen Prize for Political Writing for his book How to Be a Climate Optimist: Blueprints for a Better World.

The Leap was a finalist for the 2012 National Business Book Award and longlisted for the BC National Award for Canadian Nonfiction. The Geography of Hope was a finalist for the Governor General's Literary Award for Nonfiction, the National Business Book Award and the Alberta Literary Award for Nonfiction.

Turner has received nine gold Canadian National Magazine Awards for his work in Shift, The Walrus and Alberta Views. His essay "Why Technology Is Failing Us (And How We Can Fix It)", won the 2001 President's Medal for General Excellence, the highest honour in Canadian magazine writing.

== Electoral politics ==
Turner ran as the Green Party candidate for the Calgary Centre federal by-election held on November 26, 2012.

Canadian federal by-election, November 26, 2012: Calgary Centre Resignation of Lee Richardson
Party	Candidate	Votes	%	±%	Expenditures
Conservative	Joan Crockatt	10,191	36.87	–20.81	$95,251
Liberal	Harvey Locke	9,033	32.68	+15.15	$97,025
Green	Chris Turner	7,090	25.65	+15.72	$100,180
New Democratic	Dan Meades	1,064	3.85	–11.01	$90,148
Independent	Antony Tony Grochowski	141	0.51	–	none listed
Libertarian	Tony Prashad	121	0.44	–	$255
Total valid votes/expense limit		27,640	99.67	–	$102,128.86
Total rejected ballots		92	0.33	–0.20	
Turnout		27,732	29.32	–25.96	
Eligible voters		94,582			
Conservative hold		Swing		–35.96	
Source: Elections Canada
