= WDDO (1240 AM) =

Radio station in Macon, Georgia

- Macon, Georgia; United States
- Frequency: 1240 kHz
- Branding: 1240 WDDO

Programming
- Format: Gospel

Ownership
- Owner: Cumulus Media; (Cumulus Licensing LLC)
- Sister stations: WDEN-FM; WIFN; WLZN; WMAC; WMGB; WPEZ

History
- First air date: October 15, 1940
- Last air date: January 20, 2016
- Former call signs: WBML (1940–1978)
- Former frequencies: 1420 kHz (1940–1941)

Technical information
- Facility ID: 52546
- Class: C
- Power: 1,000 watts
- Transmitter coordinates: 32°50′18.5″N 83°39′1.7″W

WDDO was an AM radio station in Macon, Georgia, United States. It broadcast from 1940 to 2016 and was last owned by Cumulus Media and programmed with a gospel music format.

WBML went on the air on 1420 kHz in October 1940, moving to 1240 kHz less than a year later. It was one of Macon's heritage radio stations, switching to country music in 1976. A swap between WBML and WDDO, then on 900 kHz, in 1978 brought that station's Black-oriented programming to the 1240 frequency, where it could broadcast at night. The station went off the air for good in January 2016 after thieves stole copper wire from its transmitter facility.

== History ==
=== WBML: Early years ===
The Middle Georgia Broadcasting Company applied to the Federal Communications Commission (FCC) on April 22, 1940, to build a new radio station in Macon using 250 watts on 1420 kHz. The company was owned by two oil company executives, Ernest D. Black and E. G. McKenzie, and E. M. Lowe, and an officer in the H. E. Lowe Electric Company. Earlier than the proprietors expected, the FCC approved the application on May 21, conditioning the application on identification of suitable studio and transmitter sites, and granted the final permit on August 9 for the station to maintain its transmitter at 8th and Mulberry streets and its studio in Macon's First National Bank Building.

WBML—the letters representing the stockholders—made its first broadcast on October 15, 1940, a brief opening program at noon, then signed off until 6 p.m. in memory of Henry E. Lowe, who was to have opened the station and served as its manager but instead died of a brief illness two days prior; the funeral service was held at 11 a.m. that day. It was an outlet of the Mutual Broadcasting System, with Blue Network programs added in 1943; many Blue shows had not been previously heard in Macon. On March 29, 1941, the station moved to 1240 kHz as part of NARBA's national reallocation.

In 1944, WBML applied for an FM station on 45.7 MHz, which went on the air on 102.3 MHz on February 10, 1947, as WBML-FM and duplicating some of its AM programming. This service continued until it was abruptly shuttered in 1953, with the license deleted on September 23.

Studios moved into the former Macon Natural Gas building in late 1949, and two years later, the station switched networks to NBC. In 1953, WBML joined forces with WNEX (1400 AM) and an independent partner to launch WETV, a UHF television station on channel 47 and the first such station in Macon.

After the September 1952 death of Black, the company was sold twice in 1953, first to Allen Woodall of Columbus and then to C. R. "Dick" Rader and George W. Patton. Rader and Patton immediately divested their share in the television station to WNEX. The licensee was renamed Middle South Broadcasting Company in 1959, and the station upgraded to 1,000 watts of power in 1962.

Prairieland Broadcasting of Georgia, a subsidiary of a group run by Illinois interests, acquired WBML in late 1972 for $632,000. The station continued to air contemporary music and NBC programming until 1976, when both were dropped as WBML became Macon's second country music station. Prairieland sold the outlet to Network, Inc., in 1976, citing its relative distance from the company's Illinois base; Network moved its studios, citing cramped quarters at its studios on Riverside Drive, which had been in use since 1966 but which Prairieland had retained in the sale.

=== Swap with WDDO ===
Network, Inc., and Piedmont Communications Corporation, owner of WDDO (900 AM), jointly applied to the FCC in 1978 seeking to exchange licenses to move WBML to the lower 900 kHz frequency and WDDO to 1240. WDDO broadcast a "soul music" format aimed at Black listeners and had been created in 1977 as a result of needing to split programming from WCRY-FM 107.9, with which it had been simulcasting. The exchange was carried out on June 1. For WDDO, the switch to the 1240 facility was an upgrade from 250 to 1,000 watts and to nighttime operation, enabling it to mount a better challenge to heritage station WIBB.

Piedmont continued to own WDDO, along with the FM station (later WPEZ) and additional outlets acquired in the 1990s. WDDO demonstrated unusual ratings strength for an AM station, at one point rating third overall in the market and being the most-listened-to AM outlet in Macon. Piedmont sold its stations in 1996 to U.S. Broadcasting, owner of WDEN and WDEN-FM, which grew to have a six-station Macon cluster by 1997 and eight outlets by the time it sold the set to Cumulus Media in 2002 for $35 million.

Cumulus surrendered the station's license to the FCC on July 18, 2016, and the FCC cancelled it the same day. Six months prior, on January 20, vandals had stolen copper grounding wire from the transmitter site, resulting in the station going off the air.
