= WUXL =

Simulcasts WXJO, Douglasville
- Macon, Georgia; United States
- Broadcast area: Macon metropolitan area
- Frequency: 1400 kHz
- Branding: My City 104.5

Programming
- Format: Urban contemporary gospel

Ownership
- Owner: Clifton G. Moor; (B&GRS Enterprises, LLC)
- Sister stations: WDDO

History
- First air date: April 20, 1945
- Former call signs: WNEX (1945–2021)

Technical information
- Licensing authority: FCC
- Facility ID: 54034
- Class: C
- Power: 1,000 watts unlimited
- Transmitter coordinates: 32°51′7.5″N 83°39′10.6″W
- Translator: 100.5 W263CA (Macon)

Links
- Public license information: Public file; LMS
- Webcast: Listen live

WUXL (1400 AM) is a radio station in Macon, Georgia, owned by Clifton G. Moor, through licensee B&GRS Enterprises, LLC. It is an urban contemporary gospel radio station.

== History ==
WUXL signed on the air April 20, 1945, as WNEX, an affiliate of the Mutual Broadcasting System. In addition to Mutual programming, the station's format included country music, local personalities and newscasts. The station was started by Al Lowe Sr., his brother Ed Lowe, Peyton Anderson and Ellsworth Hall; the licensee was the Macon Broadcasting Company. Charlie "Peanut" Faircloth (1927–2010) was one of the first announcers. Faircloth hosted "Farm Frolics", a show for the early morning risers. He would also entertain listeners on "Hillbilly Hit Parade" airing daily at 12:15 p.m. On Saturday nights, he could be heard on a show called "Heaps of Corn". By 1948, Faircloth's "Hoedown Party" was airing nationwide on the Mutual network.

Del Ward Napier Leslie, who for many years was the popular host of "Date With Del" on WMAZ-TV (channel 13), began her broadcasting career at WNEX, hosting "Across the Breakfast Table". Another early announcer was Marion Bragg, who said in a 1980 interview that he was on air when the station signed on in 1945. The story goes that shortly before the station was to sign on, the Federal Communications Commission (FCC) asked owner Al Lowe Sr. if he had call letters in mind, he looked down at a partially covered box of Kleenex on his desk and said, yes, "WNEX".

=== Foray into television ===
In 1953, WNEX and WBML (1240 AM) combined to invest in one of the south's first UHF TV stations, WETV (channel 47). They hoped that, by signing with the NBC network, central Georgians would buy the set-top adapters required to watch the station. The two locally owned stations planned to use profits from the operation of their AM radio outlets to keep the TV station going until it could turn a profit.

WETV operated out of a new building on Macon's Pio Nono Avenue and placed advertising in Atlanta's "TV Digest", the precursor to TV Guide, and in the trade industry magazine Broadcasting in hopes of attracting national advertising. In a matter of weeks, the expense of running the station (particularly the power bill; UHF transmitters were very inefficient) caused the owners to rethink their investment in the blossoming television industry.

WETV soon changed call sign to WNEX-TV, then briefly to WOKA. In turning the station off, WNEX asked that Macon's channel 47 not be deleted from the FCC database while the owner tried to find a way to return to the air. The station never did. The combination of few potential viewers, the expense of running the station, and crushing competition from crosstown CBS affiliate WMAZ-TV (whose signal could be received on all TV sets) made UHF impractical for decades.

Several years after WETV left the air, the WETV call letters were reassigned to Atlanta's first educational TV station operating on Channel 30. NBC did not get a middle Georgia affiliate until 1968 when WCWB-TV (channel 41) signed on the air.

=== 1960s popularity ===
In the 1960s, when WNEX became affiliated with ABC, it began airing Don McNeill's Breakfast Club, Paul Harvey, and Howard Cosell's Speaking of Sports. The station switched to Top 40 music and like many stations in small and medium markets, almost immediately became a favorite with area teenagers. Disc jockeys such as Tom Healy, Tommy Goodwin, Larry O'Neal, Ted Clark, Paul Peyton (Paul Beliveau), Aaron Bowers (the Night Creature), Oscar Leverette and Johnny Hayes were well known personalities.

=== The 1970s ===
In the 1970s, WNEX was extremely popular especially among teenagers and young adults even though it had only 1,000 watts of daytime power and 250 at night. Aubrey Hammock, Lamar Studstill, Merritt Buddy Wheeler, Dennis Hayes, Oscar Leverette, Sid Ingram, Jim Pryor, Bill Elder, Ben Sandifer, Dave "King Kong" Kelly, Terry Taylor, Bob Raleigh and others kept a successful format going. Aubrey Hammock and Lamar Studstill (Jerry Walker) did the play-by-play high school football games for WNEX, as well as basketball games for Macon area. In the 1970s. Hammock also worked for WBML and WDEN-FM in Macon; WPGA-AM-FM in Perry; WFNE in Forsyth; as well as hosting a television show (Keeping in Touch) on Macon's WCOX TV Cable for eight years as well as a monthly mental health program on WSFT in Thomaston for six years. He has also had numerous articles on mental health topics published on the Web as well as writing articles for the Upson Home Journal in Thomaston for eight years and had two articles published in the Georgia Backroads Magazine in 2009 and 2011 as well as having a book published in 2011 titled The Winning Edge Lessons From Billy Henderson. Later, Dennis Hayes (no relation to Johnny Hayes) would do play-by-play. Hayes was on the air when Macon's Southwest High School won a national championship in boys' basketball. Pryor, Sandifer, Leverette and Elder went on to work for another local radio station, WMAZ-AM-FM. Barry Bullard joined WNEX in November 1984 after graduating from Columbia School of Broadcasting in Atlanta. Barry came on the air at six every evening, after Terry Taylor's show, to play classic rock oldies from the 1950s, 1960s, and 1970s. Shortly after coming on board, Barry noticed listener demand for smoother sounds in the evening. Responding to that demand, Barry Bullard began NightTracks, featuring smooth and mellow classic rock music and trivia from 8 until 10 p.m. every night. This, combined with Barry's traditional approach of mixing classic rock trivia in his nightly show, gave WNEX a "shot in the arm" before the station finally decided to change.

=== The end of music on WNEX ===
In the mid-1980s, hampered by FM competition, a weak 1,000-watt daytime signal and an even weaker 250 watts at night, WNEX gave up on music and began broadcasting sports around the clock. That format lasted but a short time before the station changed hands and aired a "travelers' radio" format. For a time, WNEX went dark. The studio, off Rogers Place in Macon burned to the ground but the transmitter survived the fire. Purchased by Register Communications, the station went back on the air, first with all sports programming and later the Radio Disney network on November 9, 1998. In November 2008, with the Radio Disney contract set to expire, WNEX teamed with co-owned WPGA to broadcast a talk radio format. Kenny Burgamy and Charles Richardson, who co-hosted a morning talk show on WMAC a few years earlier, anchored morning drive on the newly formatted stations. The show was simulcast on macon.com, the website of the Macon Telegraph where Richardson is employed as an editorial writer and columnist.

In May 2010, the Macon Telegraph announced it would end its partnership with Register Communications, effective July 9. The morning drive program hosted by Burgamy and Richardson moved on July 12, to WGXA with a simulcast on WMAC and the Telegraph's website, Macon.com. Register Communications began a new morning talk program,"Mix In The Morning". The show was simulcast on WPGA-TV and WPGA-FM. WNEX, which had been simulcasting the program along with WPGA, changed formats in mid-2011 to urban gospel. In 2015, Register Communications brought WNEX-FM back on 100.9 MHz, serving the city of Perry with an oldies format. The station had previously broadcast a country format under the call letters WPGA-FM. In June, 2016, WNEX and two sister stations that had been owned by Register Communications were sold by a court-appointed receiver to Creek Media, LLC. On July 8, 2016, WNEX-FM started broadcasting an Americana format and rebranded themselves as "The Creek" with plans for live, local programming. By June 2020, WNEX was simulcasting an alternative format with W263CA 100.5 FM.

The call sign were changed to WUXL on September 3, 2021. Effective February 4, 2022, Creek Media sold WUXL to Clifton Moor's B&GRS Enterprises, LLC at a purchase price of $50,000. As of August, 2026, the station is silent. B&GRS Enterprises sites a loss of programming for the shutdown.

Former employees Paul Beliveau and Pete Konenkamp were inducted into the Georgia Association of Broadcasters Hall Of Fame in 2014 and 2025 respectively.
