= WPGA =

WPGA may refer to:

== Radio stations ==
- WDDO (AM), a radio station (980 AM) licensed to Perry, Georgia, United States, which held the call sign WPGA until 2016
- WNEX-FM, a radio station (100.9 FM) licensed to Perry, Georgia, which held the call sign WPGA-FM until 2015

== Television stations ==
- WPGA-LD, a low-powered television station (channel 18, virtual 50) licensed to Macon, Georgia, United States
- WPGA-TV, a television station (channel 23, virtual 58) licensed to Perry, Georgia, United States

== Golf ==
- WPGA, the Women's Professional Golf Association, the 1940s predecessor of the LPGA.
- WPGA, the Women's Professional Golfers' Association, founded in 1978 and now known as the Ladies European Tour
