= WAYS (1500 AM) =

Radio station in Macon, Georgia, United States (1967–2020)

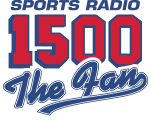
- Macon, Georgia; United States
- Broadcast area: Macon and vicinity
- Frequency: 1500 kHz
- Branding: 1500 The Fan

Programming
- Format: Sports radio
- Affiliations: CBS Sports Radio

Ownership
- Owner: Cumulus Media; (Cumulus Licensing LLC)
- Sister stations: WDEN-FM; WLZN; WMAC; WMGB; WPEZ

History
- First air date: 1967
- Last air date: February 25, 2020
- Former call signs: WDEN (1967–1982); WPTC (1982–2000); WDEN (2000–2004); WWFN (2004–2005); WAYS (2005–2020); WRWM (2020)

Technical information
- Facility ID: 68678
- Class: D
- Power: 1,000 watts (day only)
- Transmitter coordinates: 32°48′47.5″N 83°37′35.7″W

WAYS (1500 AM) was a radio station serving the Macon, Georgia, area with a sports radio format. This station was under ownership of Cumulus Media.

== History ==
Until September 4, 2009, WAYS was an oldies station affiliated with Citadel Media's True Oldies Channel as "Oldies Radio 1500".

Because it shared the same frequency as clear-channel station WFED in Washington, D.C., WAYS could broadcast only during daytime hours. However, their online webcast was available 24 hours a day.

On February 25, 2020, WAYS (which had adopted the WRWM call letters on February 20; WAYS was transferred to 1050 AM in Conway, South Carolina) went off the air and surrendered its license to the Federal Communications Commission (FCC). At the time of the closure, WAYS had a sports radio format as "1500 The Fan", an affiliate of CBS Sports Radio. The FCC cancelled the station's license on February 27, 2020.
