= WNEX =

WNEX may refer to:

- WNEX-FM, a radio station (100.9 FM) licensed to serve Perry, Georgia, United States
- WUXL, a radio station (1400 AM) licensed to serve Macon, Georgia, which held the call sign WNEX from 1945 to 2021
