= WNEX-TV =

WETV, WNEX-TV, WOKA
- Macon, Georgia; United States
- Channels: Analog: 47 (UHF)

Programming
- Affiliations: NBC (1953–1955); ABC (1953–1954)

Ownership
- Owner: Macon Television Company

History
- First air date: August 21, 1953
- Last air date: May 31, 1955
- Former call signs: WETV (1953–1954); WNEX-TV (1954–May 1955); WOKA (May 11−31, 1955)

Technical information
- ERP: 20 kW
- HAAT: 437 ft (133 m)
- Transmitter coordinates: 32°49′3″N 83°39′53″W

WNEX-TV, known as WETV from 1953 to 1954 and WOKA in May 1955, was a television station on channel 47 in Macon, Georgia, United States. It was the first station on the air in Macon and held an affiliation with NBC throughout its existence; it initially was also affiliated with ABC. The station's studios and transmitter were located along Pio Nono Avenue.

While it was the first to air in Middle Georgia, the presence of a VHF television station, WMAZ-TV, severely hurt its economic viability at a time when UHF stations could not be received in all homes. In 1955, it was sold and closed after just a month under new ownership in evident financial distress.

== History ==
In 1952, the Federal Communications Commission (FCC) lifted its freeze on new television stations. That opened the door for television to come to Macon, which was allocated three channels: one VHF and two UHF, one of which would be reserved for educational broadcasting. Radio station WMAZ (940 AM) had filed for a station on VHF before the freeze was enacted, and after the freeze, the Middle Georgia Broadcasting Company, which owned WBML (1240 AM), applied for the commercial UHF channel, 47. In August, it combined efforts with WNEX (1400 AM) to form the Macon Television Company, a joint venture of WBML and WNEX formed to own and operate the proposed television station.

While there were no competing applicants, concern did come about that the two stations directly owning 50 percent might violate FCC rules. As a result, a third shareholder without broadcasting experience, Macon businessman W. A. Fickling, was brought in to own 10 percent and serve as a "buffer" between the radio stations, each owning 45 percent. Once this modification was made, the FCC granted a construction permit to the Macon Television Company on February 12, 1953. The television station would be operated separately from either radio outlet and would also maintain separate facilities on Pio Nono Avenue, on which construction began in March; also at that time, the call sign WETV was assigned.

Nearly a month after starting test transmissions on July 25, WETV made its on-air debut on August 21, 1953, bringing television to Macon for the first time and becoming Georgia's first TV station on the UHF band. Network programs arrived via separate coaxial cables—ABC from Jacksonville, Florida, and NBC from Atlanta; WNEX and WBML, respectively, were the city's radio affiliates for ABC and NBC. The station was also equipped with one camera for local programs and promised 20 local shows a week. CBS and the DuMont Television Network arrived in town when WMAZ-TV went on the air on September 27. While WMAZ had superior facilities to WETV, including two cameras, the station still held its own in producing local programs, including a show along the lines of Name That Tune. On one occasion, it moved its lone camera out of the studio to film the moon: Bob Saggese, a station employee, later recalled to The Macon News that "we thought we were really something".

WBML wound down its involvement in the television venture after just a few months, within days of the announcement that WBML was being sold. In December 1953, it announced it had sold its stake in the Macon Television Company to WNEX, which stated its plans to rename the station WNEX-TV when the transaction was finalized. FCC authorization for the sale came in February 1954, and the call sign changed on March 4. Even though the station was now majority-owned by ABC radio's Macon affiliate, that network opted for a secondary affiliation with the stronger WMAZ-TV; by June 13, all ABC shows had moved to channel 13. As a VHF station, WMAZ-TV did not need to worry about how many television households in Macon had converted their sets to receive UHF (with the All-Channel Receiver Act years away); it could sell all of them, giving it a major advantage in sales and hurting WNEX-TV's revenue. As a result, it quickly became the dominant station in the region.

After more than a year of majority ownership, WNEX and Fickling sold channel 47 to a partnership consisting of E. K. Cargill, a former president and founder of WMAZ radio, and J. C. Barnes, Sr., a Texas oilman and Cargill's uncle, in April 1955. The buyers assumed an estimated $245,889 in liabilities associated with WNEX-TV; the sellers reported an operating deficit exceeding $196,000. On May 11, to reflect the removal of WNEX from the station's ownership, new WOKA call letters debuted. As it happened, the station was not able to continue for much longer after the second call sign change; even when it was sold, at least one employee was owed for months worth of work. On May 31, the station went off the air in what was described as a temporary suspension of operations; the FCC was told Barnes did not want to keep underwriting the firm's losses. In the wake of the closing, several lawsuits were filed against the Macon Television Company seeking thousands of dollars in unpaid contracts for programming. The FCC canceled the station's construction permit in September 1956. The property was rezoned for commercial development that year, and the studio building was occupied by Pet Milk until being demolished due to road construction and the arrival of the Eisenhower Parkway.

With WOKA's demise, WMAZ-TV would remain the only television station in Macon until 1968, when WCWB-TV (channel 41, now WMGT-TV) went into service.
