= WPGA-LD =

Television station in Macon, Georgia, United States

- Macon, Georgia; United States
- Channels: Digital: 18 (UHF); Virtual: 50

Programming
- Affiliations: 50.1: Peachtree Sports Network; for others, see § Subchannels

Ownership
- Owner: Gray Media; (Gray Television Licensee, LLC)
- Sister stations: WPGA-TV

History
- Founded: August 31, 1989
- First air date: April 13, 1998
- Former call signs: W66BH (1989–1995); W52CL (1995–2004); W50DA (2004–2009); WPGA-LP (2009–2021)
- Former channel numbers: Analog: 52 (UHF, 1998–2004), 50 (UHF, 2004–2021)
- Former affiliations: TBN (1998–2009); RTV (2009–2011); This TV (2011–2015); Silent (2015–2021); Scripps News (2021–2023)
- Call sign meaning: Perry, Georgia (after co-owned stations WPGA-TV and WPGA-FM)

Technical information
- Licensing authority: FCC
- Facility ID: 67972
- Class: LD
- ERP: 15 kW
- HAAT: 133.7 m (439 ft)
- Transmitter coordinates: 32°45′4.3″N 83°33′26.7″W

Links
- Public license information: LMS

WPGA-LD (channel 50) is a low-power television station in Macon, Georgia, United States. It is owned by Gray Media alongside Perry-licensed MeTV affiliate WPGA-TV (channel 58). The two stations share offices at the corner of Second and Cherry streets in downtown Macon, with master control and most internal operations based at Gray flagship WANF on 14th Street Northwest in the Home Park neighborhood of Atlanta; WPGA-LD's transmitter is located on GA 87/US 23/US 129 ALT (Golden Isles Highway), along the Twiggs–Bibb county line.

== History ==
The station first signed on the air on April 13, 1998, as W52CL on channel 52; it originally operated as an owned-and-operated translator station of the Trinity Broadcasting Network. On July 14, 2004, the station changed its callsign to W50DA and moved to channel 50. In 2009, Register Communications (owner of then-ABC affiliate WPGA-TV) purchased the station from TBN for $6,000. In early September 2009, W50DA dropped TBN programming and announced that it would change its network affiliation to the Retro Television Network on October 12. The day after the switch, the station's callsign was changed to WPGA-LP.

WPGA-LP had a construction permit that was first issued to the station by the Federal Communications Commission (FCC) in 2006 to flash-cut its digital signal into operation, which would significantly increase its signal coverage; this permit expired in March 2009. In mid-August 2011, WPGA-LP changed its primary affiliation to This TV, which was previously carried on the second digital subchannel of WPGA-TV (which is now affiliated with MeTV).

In addition to This TV programming, WPGA-LP for a time once used to simulcast the WPGA-FM radio program Mix in the Morning, which also aired on WPGA-TV, WPGA (980 AM) and WNEX (1400 AM), each weekday from 6 to 9 a.m.

On July 2, 2015, This TV moved back to WPGA-TV on DT3; subsequently, WPGA-LP went dark for an undetermined amount of time.

On July 14, 2021, WPGA-LP was licensed to begin digital operation, changing its call sign to WPGA-LD.

On October 26, 2021, after six years of silence, WPGA-LD returned to the air affiliating with the Atlanta-based 24 hour news network Newsy (now Scripps News). As of October 1, 2023, it switched to Peachtree Sports Network.

== Subchannels ==
The station's signal is multiplexed:

Subchannels of WPGA-TV
Subchannel	Res.	Short name	Programming
50.1	1080i	PSN	Peachtree Sports Network
50.2	480i	STORYTV	Story Television
50.3	480i	WPGA365	365BLK
50.4	480i	WPGAOUT	Outlaw
50.5	480i	TOONS	MeTV Toons
50.6	480i	MOVIES	Movies!
