= WDDO (disambiguation) =

WDDO may refer to:

- WDDO (AM), a radio station (980 AM) licensed to serve Perry, Georgia, United States
- WYPZ (AM), a radio station (900 AM) licensed to serve Macon, Georgia, United States, which held the WDDO call sign from 1977 to 1978
- WDDO (1240 AM), a defunct radio station (1240 AM) formerly licensed to serve Macon, Georgia, which held the WDDO call sign from 1978 until its deletion in 2016
