= WIFN =

WIFN may refer to:

- WIFN (AM) 1340 in Atlanta, Georgia
- WAYS (AM) 1500 in Macon, Georgia
- WLXF 105.5 in Macon, Georgia
