= Bill Shanks =

American sports broadcaster and writer

Bill Shanks is an American sports broadcaster and writer.

== Personal life ==
Shanks lives in Macon, Georgia. Shanks, originally from Waycross, Georgia, is a graduate of the University of Georgia. Shanks was a television sports anchor at WBSG in Brunswick, Georgia and WGXA in Macon, Georgia. Shanks also had a sports production company and produced and hosted weekly television shows with the Atlanta Braves, the Atlanta Hawks, and the Atlantic Sun Conference.

== Professional background ==
=== Broadcasting ===
Bill Shanks hosts "The Bill Shanks Show" on WXKO Middle Georgia's ESPN in Macon. Shanks is also a columnist for The Athens Banner-Herald and hosts a weekly high school football show called The End Zone on WMGT-TV 41 NBC. Shanks has covered the Atlanta Braves for Fox Sports South.com and Scout.com. In 2006 Shanks was one of the co-hosts of the Braves Wrap-Up Show on the Atlanta Braves Radio Network. Shanks' show covers topics like the University of Georgia and Head Coach Mark Richt, who "lost him" in 2008.

Shanks started his daily radio show in March 2007 on WIFN 105.5 The Fan in Macon. The show was canceled on February 9, 2009. Six weeks later, on March 23, 2009, Shanks' show was back on the air on the Clear Channel (now iHeartRadio) affiliate.

After 7 years at iHeartRadio, he moved his show to his own station which is affiliated with ESPN Radio starting on June 1, 2016.

Shanks has provided Braves' reports on radio stations in Athens, Georgia on WRFC, in Spartanburg, SC on WSPG and in Florence, AL on WYTK.

=== Writing ===
Shanks wrote a book called Scout's Honor: The Bravest Way to Build a Winning Team. He interviewed people for nine months and afterwards took six months to write the book. It is both Shanks' answer to Moneyball and the story of how the Braves became the successful organization that they are today. It tells how John Schuerholz rose through the ranks and tells the tales of individual Braves prospects, from Jeff Francoeur, Brian McCann, Adam LaRoche, John Smoltz, and Adam Wainwright. Some have questioned Shanks' objectivity in regards to John Schuerholz. Baseball writer Jon Heyman described Shanks' close relationship with John Schuerholz being "so close to John Schuerholz he’s practically his ghost writer.

David Leonhardt of The New York Times described Shanks as "openly contemptuous of the Lewis book". John Conniff of Scout.com criticized the book for "fail[ing] to develop any type of coherent argument, structure, or evidence to support his contention or to more importantly explain the reasons for the Braves success". The Sun-Sentinel's Mike Berardino praised the book for "present[ing] a fascinating and long-overdue look at Atlanta's baseball dynasty".

=== Controversy ===
On May 3, 2016 Shanks authored a controversial column in the Macon Telegraph advocating the return of Chief Noc-A-Homa as the Braves mascot Shanks also called for a return of the teepee in the bleachers. The article immediately received criticism and the Macon Telegraph deleted the article within a few hours. The Telegraph’s sports editor claimed on Twitter that the piece was pulled because Shanks "had a better idea for a column."
