= WPGA-TV =

Television station in Perry, Georgia, United States

- Perry–Macon, Georgia; United States
- City: Perry, Georgia
- Channels: Digital: 23 (UHF); Virtual: 58
- Branding: WPGA MeTV 58; WPGA News

Programming
- Affiliations: 58.1: MeTV/News Programming; for others, see § Subchannels

Ownership
- Owner: Gray Media; (Gray Television Licensee, LLC)
- Sister stations: WPGA-LD

History
- Founded: September 20, 1991
- First air date: March 1, 1995
- Former channel numbers: Analog: 58 (UHF, 1995–2009); Digital: 32 (UHF, 2003–2019)
- Former affiliations: Fox (March–December 1995); UPN (secondary, 1995–1996); ABC (1996–2009); Independent (2010–2020); RTV (secondary, 2010–2011); This TV (secondary, 2010–2013)
- Call sign meaning: Perry, Georgia (after the radio station)

Technical information
- Licensing authority: FCC
- Facility ID: 54728
- ERP: 82.2 kW
- HAAT: 190 m (623 ft)
- Transmitter coordinates: 32°45′4.3″N 83°33′26.7″W

Links
- Public license information: Public file; LMS
- Website: www.wpganews.com

WPGA-TV (channel 58) is a television station licensed to Perry, Georgia, United States, serving as the MeTV affiliate for the Macon area. It is owned by Gray Media alongside low-power Peachtree Sports Network outlet WPGA-LD (channel 50). The two stations share offices at the corner of Second and Cherry streets in downtown Macon, with master control and most internal operations based at Gray flagship WANF on 14th Street Northwest in the Home Park neighborhood of Atlanta; WPGA-TV's transmitter is located on GA 87/US 23/US 129 ALT (Golden Isles Highway), along the Twiggs–Bibb county line.

== History ==
=== As a Fox affiliate ===
The station first signed on the air on March 1, 1995, as the Macon market's original Fox affiliate. It was locally owned by Register Communications. Prior to the station's sign-on, Macon residents could only receive Fox network programing via Foxnet (the network's now-defunct national cable feed) or via Fox stations piped in from the nearby Atlanta market (network-owned WATL from the network's launch in October 1986 until December 1994, and then WAGA-TV from December 1994 until WPGA's sign-on). In addition, when Fox assumed the broadcast rights to the National Football Conference television package from CBS in 1994, ABC affiliate WGXA (channel 24) carried Fox's NFL telecasts on Sunday afternoons until December 1994.

=== As an ABC affiliate ===
On September 10, 1995, GOCOM Media announced that it had signed an agreement with Fox to move its affiliation to WGXA, effectively ending WPGA's tenure with the network at the end of that year (after only ten months as a Fox station). Shortly afterward, Register Communications signed an affiliation agreement to make WPGA the Macon market's new ABC affiliate. The affiliation swap took place on January 1, 1996, ending WGXA's fourteen-year tenure with ABC.

WPGA started a newscast in January 2001, but it was dropped in January 2002. In July 2007, WPGA-TV changed its on-air branding from "ABC 58" to "ABC Macon". In July 2007, Register Communications contracted with Independent News Network (INN) for news production which lasted until the original owner of INN filed bankruptcy in January 2009.

On October 29, 2009, Register Communications announced that WPGA-TV would terminate its affiliation contract with the network and become an independent station. Owner Lowell Register cited concerns that ABC's programming did not meet the station's family-oriented focus, and also objected to the network's decision to begin requiring its affiliates to pay an annual fee of $500,000 to carry its programming.

=== As an independent station and MeTV affiliate ===
WPGA-TV's logo as "Macon TV WPGA", used from 2010 to 2020.

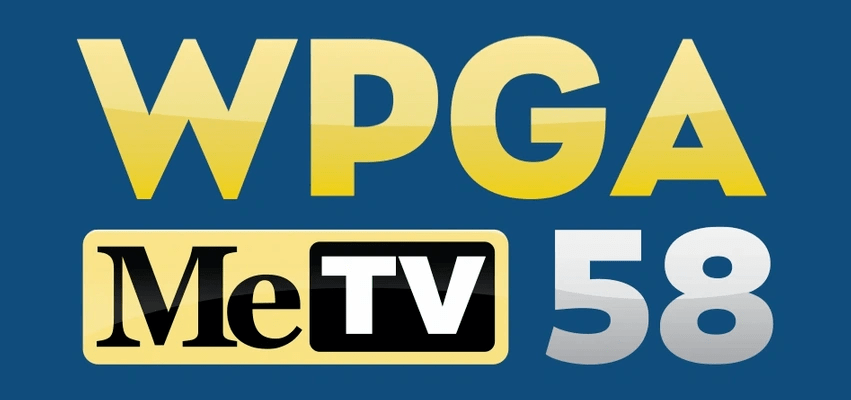
WPGA-TV's logo as MeTV affiliate, used in 2020.

Upon becoming an independent station on January 1, 2010, WPGA began cherry-picking select programs from the Retro Television Network (sharing the affiliation with sister station WPGA-LP) in addition to shows from This TV and retained the station's existing syndicated programming.

The station's disaffiliation from ABC resulted in a dispute with Cox Communications over its channel 6 slot, as Cox intended to drop WPGA in favor of WGXA-DT2, a move that Register contended the provider does not have the right to make. On December 22, 2009, WPGA was granted a temporary restraining order requiring Cox to continue to carry the station on channels 6 and 706; however, the court later dismissed WPGA's case on April 30, 2010. Register filed an appeal; in light of this, a judge ordered Cox to leave WPGA on its existing channel slots until an appeals court heard the case. In addition, Register also filed a petition with the Federal Communications Commission (FCC) over the status of WPGA's channel placement on Cox. Satellite provider DirecTV would drop WPGA itself on January 1, though the station remains available on Dish Network, as well as cable providers that the station maintains must carry agreements with (Register considers Cox to have such an agreement, even though the cable provider claims it instead has a retransmission consent agreement). On June 23, 2011, the Georgia Court of Appeals upheld the ruling that would enable Cox to drop WPGA from its lineup, effective July 28. On that date, WGXA-DT2 would begin to be carried on both channel 6 and its existing channel 15 position; with the subchannel being carried exclusively on channel 6 starting August 28 (channel 15 would then be used for bandwidth for the system's high-definition channels).

On July 12, 2011, Register filed a complaint in the U.S. District Court for the Middle District of Georgia, seeking an injunction to prevent Cox from not only dropping WPGA, but from giving the channel 6 slot to WGXA-DT2. However, Cox announced that it would go forward with the channel shuffle despite the complaint, as the previous court case authorized them to make the changes. In addition, the FCC ruled on December 5, 2011, that WPGA's contract with Cox rendered it a station that elected retransmission consent.

Register Communications was delinquent on about $7.5 million in loans, property taxes and federal payroll taxes. Thus, a Bibb County court appointed Green Bull Georgia Partners—a single-purpose entity set up by Candlewood Partners—as receiver for Register in April 2015.

Radio Perry Inc. (debtor in possession) agreed to sell the station to Marquee Broadcasting in October 2019.

=== Sale to Gray Television ===
Marquee Broadcasting announced on February 15, 2023, that it would trade WPGA-TV and WPGA-LD to Gray Television in exchange for Gray's KNIN-TV serving the Boise, Idaho, market. The station swap would complete a key objective for Gray by giving it a full-service station in every market in Georgia, the company's home state (although Gray does not own stations in the Chattanooga or Jacksonville markets which each include some Georgia counties). The swap was consummated on May 1, 2023.

== Newscasts ==
WPGA first started a newscast in April 2001; it was dropped in January 2002. In July 2007, Register Communications contracted with Independent News Network (INN) for news production. Originally, INN produced 30 minute newscasts at 7 and 11 p.m. For economic reasons, the 11 p.m. newscast was later canceled. In August 2008, WPGA and The Telegraph started a production partnership for a morning show, Kenny B and Charles E: Your Mix in the Morning, on WPGA-FM 100.9 (6 to 9 a.m.) and on channel 58 (6 to 7 a.m.). The original owner of INN filed bankruptcy in January 2009, leading to the cancellation of the 7 p.m. newscast.

In 2022, NewsNet produced newscasts for both WGTA and WPGA titled Georgia's News at Nine. The production ended in 2023.

On April 1, 2024, Gray Television relaunched newscasts for WPGA-TV produced by Atlanta sister station WANF; a few weeks prior to that, WPGA-TV began simulcasting Atlanta News First at 10 from WPCH-TV.

== Technical information ==
=== Subchannels ===
The station's signal is multiplexed:

Subchannels of WPGA-TV
Subchannel	Res.	Short name	Programming
58.1	720p	WPGA	MeTV
58.2	480i	HI	Heroes & Icons
58.3	480i	Ion	Ion
58.4	480i	STARTTV	Start TV
58.5	480i	Grit	Grit
58.6	480i	COURTTV	Court TV
58.7	480i	CATCHY	Catchy Comedy
58.8	480i	MeTV	MeTV

In April 2010, WPGA began carrying This TV on its second digital subchannel. In early spring 2011, the station began airing select MeTV programs on its primary channel; the station would later begin carrying the complete MeTV schedule on digital channel 58.2. In August 2011, the station had agreed to add select programs from KIN TV, an African-American subchannel network distributed by MGM Television, to its primary subchannel (the network never launched). On September 26, 2011, WPGA became a charter affiliate of Bounce TV, carrying the network on digital subchannel 58.3. On July 2, 2015, This TV replaced Bounce TV on sub-channel 58.3, which was previously on WPGA-LP channel 50; Bounce TV was then taken up by WMGT-TV on digital channel 41.3.

Since the 2014–15 television season, WPGA-TV has been gradually adding MeTV programming to the main channel in place of syndicated programming as contracts with its syndicators expired. By April 1, 2020, WPGA-TV became a full time MeTV affiliate and added Ion Television on 58.4, Grit on 58.5, and Court TV on 58.6 to its subchannel lineup. On April 17, the station added Start TV, Decades and Movies! to its lineup.

=== Analog-to-digital conversion ===
WPGA's broadcasts became digital-only, effective February 24, 2009.
