= Joel Godard =

American television announcer

- Born: March 31, 1938 (age 88); Milledgeville, Georgia, U.S.
- Education: Emory University
- Occupation: Television announcer
- Spouse(s): (unknown); Tedi Dreiser Godard (married 1983)
- Children: 1 (son from first marriage)

Joel Clinton Godard Jr. (born March 31, 1938) is an American television announcer and voiceover artist, best known as the announcer for Late Night with Conan O'Brien during its entire 16-year run from 1993 to 2009.

== Early life ==
Godard attended Emory University, and earned his AB in 1960 with a double major in chemistry and pre-med. He was accepted into the school's medical program, but instead chose to try a career in the entertainment industry. Around 1968, Godard worked three jobs at the same time while living in Macon, Georgia: analyzing electroplating solutions at Maxson Electronics; acting as a news anchor and "stand-up weatherman" for WMAZ-TV; and as a licensed pilot for Lowe Aviation. He served as a production assistant at WMAZ radio in 1970.

== Career ==
During the early 1980s, Godard had roles in the made-for-TV movie Guyana Tragedy: The Story of Jim Jones and the TBS soap opera The Caitlins. In the 1980s and 1990s, Godard made voiceover appearances on Saturday Night Live, NBC Nightly News, and Issues and Answers. Around 1986, he became an NBC staff announcer. Godard was the voice of the Macy's Thanksgiving Day Parade from 2000 to 2010.

In 2014, he starred in a series of online comedy shorts by Turtle with Lemonade Productions, entitled "Little Known Moments in American History."

=== Late Night with Conan O'Brien ===
Godard joined Late Night with Conan O'Brien when it was launched in 1993. He frequently appeared in sketches, often pretending to be a suicidal homosexual filled with self-loathing, and with a penchant for bizarre sex acts, substance abuse, and "young Asian men (preferably wearing Speedos)". He would also often refer to the "small, windowless booth" from which he announced. Through the years, Late Night's writers gave Godard a number of bizarre backstories; for example, one typical skit involved the announcer referring to having had multiple "loveless" marriages and "a botched mid-life circumcision," as well as his "ultimate sexual fantasy": a man dressed as Abraham Lincoln wearing BDSM leathers and a ball gag. Godard would almost always deliver all of his lines – no matter how bizarre or disturbing the content – in a cheerful announcer's voice along with a wide smile plastered on his face.

When Conan O'Brien left Late Night to take over The Tonight Show, Godard did not follow him to Los Angeles. Godard wrote on his Facebook fan page that "Reports of my retirement were exaggerated. Conan just didn't take me to California with him. I remain in New York City with no LA lease to be stuck with!!!" Instead, former Late Night sidekick Andy Richter was hired as announcer on The Tonight Show with Conan O'Brien, and Saturday Night Live producer Steve Higgins became the announcer on Late Night with Jimmy Fallon.

== Personal life ==
Godard has been married to actress/singer Tedi Dreiser Godard since 1983 and has one child from a previous marriage. Tedi is the grandniece of novelist Theodore Dreiser and composer Paul Dresser. Godard is a member of Mensa International.

Media offices
| Preceded by Bill Wendell | Late Night announcer September 13, 1993 – February 20, 2009 | Succeeded by Steve Higgins |
