= WMAZ-TV =

Television station in Macon, Georgia, United States

- Macon, Georgia; United States
- Channels: Digital: 13 (VHF); Virtual: 13
- Branding: 13WMAZ; Central Georgia CW 13.2

Programming
- Affiliations: 13.1: CBS; 13.2: CW+; for others, see § Subchannels

Ownership
- Owner: Tegna Inc., a subsidiary of Nexstar Media Group; (Pacific and Southern, LLC)

History
- First air date: September 27, 1953
- Former channel numbers: Analog: 13 (VHF, 1953–2009); Digital: 4 (VHF, 2003–2009)
- Former affiliations: All secondary: DuMont (1953–1955); NBC (1955–1968); ABC (1954–1982)
- Call sign meaning: Derived from WMAZ radio, whose call sign was sequentially assigned (Note: Originally owned by Mercer University, its officials assigned the backronym "Watch Mercer Attain Zenith" prior to sign-on in 1924.)

Technical information
- Licensing authority: FCC
- Facility ID: 46991
- ERP: 52.6 kW
- HAAT: 238 m (781 ft)
- Transmitter coordinates: 32°45′10″N 83°33′32″W

Links
- Public license information: Public file; LMS
- Website: www.13wmaz.com

WMAZ-TV (channel 13) is a television station in Macon, Georgia, United States, affiliated with CBS and The CW Plus. The station is owned by the Tegna subsidiary of Nexstar Media Group. WMAZ-TV's studios are located on Gray Highway on the northeast side of Macon; its transmitter is located on GA 87/US 23/129 ALT (Golden Isles Highway) along the Twiggs–Bibb county line.

== History ==
The station first signed on the air on September 27, 1953. It was the second TV station in Macon. WETV, later WNEX-TV and WOKA (channel 47), had begun operation on August 25, 1953, co-owned by WBML (1240 AM) and WNEX (1400 AM). However, in the 1950s, few people had TVs that received UHF channels; after being sold while in debt, it ended operations in May 1955.

WMAZ-TV was originally owned by the Southeastern Broadcasting Company and took its calls from co-owned WMAZ radio (940 AM, now WMAC, and 99.1 FM, now WLXF at 105.5). WMAZ-TV is the fourth-oldest television station in the state of Georgia and the oldest outside of Atlanta, beating WDAK-TV (now WTVM) in Columbus to the air by only one day. The Federal Communications Commission (FCC) awarded Southeastern Broadcasting a license to operate a television station on its second try; it had previously made an unsuccessful bid for the VHF channel 7 allocation one year earlier in 1952. The new station was one of the most powerful VHF stations in the country, providing at least secondary signal coverage from the southern Atlanta suburbs to the western suburbs of Savannah.

The station has been a primary CBS affiliate from its launch, owing to its radio sister's longtime affiliation with the CBS Radio Network. In addition, WMAZ-TV also carried secondary affiliations with ABC, NBC and the DuMont Television Network. It lost DuMont in 1955, one year before the network ceased operations. Southeastern Broadcasting sold WMAZ-AM-FM-TV to Southern Broadcasting Corporation in 1963, earning a healthy return on its 1929 lease and 1935 purchase of WMAZ-AM. Southern Broadcasting merged with the Greenville, South Carolina–based News-Piedmont Company to form Multimedia, Inc. in 1967.

After the failure of WNEX-TV, WMAZ was the only commercial television station in the Macon market until September 1968, when WCWB-TV (channel 41, now WMGT-TV) signed on and took the NBC affiliation. WMAZ-TV continued to carry select ABC programs (notably the soap opera General Hospital in the afternoons and Saturday NCAA football coverage in the fall) until WGXA (channel 24, now a dual Fox/ABC affiliate) started operations in April 1982.

In 1974, WMAZ-AM-FM-TV moved to a new studio facility on Gray Highway in Macon. WMAZ-TV remains the only VHF station in Macon. This was due partly to an exception to the FCC's "2 1/2 + 1" plan for allocating VHF television bandwidth. In the early days of broadcast television, there were twelve VHF channels available, and 69 UHF channels (which was later reduced to 56 with the removal of high-band channels 70-83 in the early 1980s). The VHF band was more desirable because signals broadcasting on there traveled a longer distance. Because there were only twelve VHF channels available, there were limitations as to how closely the stations could be spaced. With the release of the FCC's Sixth Report and Order in 1952, the Commission outlined a new allocation table for VHF licenses and opened up the UHF band. Through these initiatives, almost all of the United States would be able to receive two commercial VHF channels plus one non-commercial allocation. Most of the rest of the country ("1/2") would be able to receive a third VHF channel. Other areas of the country would be designated as "UHF islands," since they were too close to larger cities for VHF service. The "2" networks became CBS and NBC, "+1" represented non-commercial educational (public television, usually affiliated with NET) stations, and "1/2" became ABC, which, as the smallest and weakest network then, usually wound up with the UHF allocation where no VHF allocation was available (or was relegated to secondary affiliations with the CBS and/or NBC stations).

However, Macon is sandwiched between Atlanta (channels 2, 5, 8, and 11) to the north, Columbus (channels 3 and 9) to the west, Albany (channel 10) to the south, and Augusta (channels 6 and 12) and Savannah (channels 3, 9, and 11) to the east. This created a large "doughnut" in central Georgia where there could be only one VHF license. Partly because WMAZ-TV was able to gain that license, it has dominated the ratings in central Georgia for most of its history.

WMAZ-TV logo prior to April 2018

The station's longtime slogan, "Straight from the Heart", dates back to 1983, when WMAZ-TV debuted an image campaign based on Bryan Adams' song of the same name, tying into Macon's location near the geographical center of the state (which is southeast of Macon in Twiggs County). Its NBC-affiliated sister station in Knoxville, Tennessee, WBIR-TV, also uses the slogan and image campaign.

On July 24, 1995, the Gannett Company announced its acquisition of Multimedia for $1.7 billion. When the FCC approved the merger in November 1995, it announced that WMAZ-TV, along with KOCO-TV in Oklahoma City and WLWT in Cincinnati, would have to be divested to comply with cross-ownership regulations. Gannett was granted a waiver to operate KOCO-TV and Multimedia Cablevision until December 1996, after which it would be required to sell either of the two properties. Shortly after the deal was consummated, the FCC increased the size of the ownership cap to allow companies to own stations that covered 35% of all U.S. households; as a result, Gannett ultimately retained control of WMAZ-TV, which became sister to Georgia's third-oldest television station, WXIA-TV in Atlanta. WLWT and KOCO-TV were traded to Argyle II in January 1997; the merger between Argyle II and Hearst Television would be finalized seven months later.

On June 29, 2015, the Gannett Company split in two, with one side specializing in print media and the other side specializing in broadcast and digital media. WMAZ-TV was retained by the latter company, renamed Tegna.

Nexstar Media Group acquired Tegna in a deal announced in August 2025 and completed on March 19, 2026.

== WMAZ-DT2 ==
WMAZ-DT2, branded on-air as Central Georgia's CW, is the CW owned-and-operated second digital subchannel of WMAZ-TV, broadcasting in 720p high definition on channel 13.2. All programming on WMAZ-DT2 is received through The CW's programming feed for smaller media markets, The CW Plus, which provides a set schedule of syndicated programming acquired by The CW for broadcast during time periods outside of the network's regular programming hours; however, Tegna handles local advertising and promotional services for the subchannel.

=== History ===
The subchannel's history traces back to the September 21, 1998, launch of "WBMN", a cable-only affiliate of The WB Television Network that was originally managed and promoted by Cox Communications alongside the launch of The WB 100+ Station Group, a similar service to The CW Plus that was created to expand national coverage of The WB via primarily local origination channels managed by cable providers in markets ranked above #100 by Nielsen Media Research. Since it was a cable-exclusive outlet and therefore not licensed by the FCC, the channel used the "WBMN" call sign in a fictional manner.

Prior to the launch of the cable channel, residents in the Macon market were only able to receive WB network programming on cable via the network's Atlanta affiliate WATL or via Chicago-based superstation WGN on both cable and satellite.

On January 24, 2006, the Warner Bros. unit of Time Warner and CBS Corporation announced that the two companies would shut down The WB and UPN and combine the networks' respective programming to create a new "fifth" network called The CW. The CW Plus was created by the network as a replacement for The WB 100+ Station Group to allow the existing cable outlets as well as low-power analog stations and digital subchannels of major network affiliates in smaller markets that joined The WB 100+ in the years following its launch to maintain a network affiliation; "WBMN" affiliated with The CW Plus on September 18, 2006, upon the launch of The CW.

On October 3, 2013, the Gannett Company announced that WMAZ-TV would carry The CW on a new second digital subchannel, retaining the "Central Georgia's CW" branding used by "WBMN". On October 11, 2013, WMAZ-TV began transmitting a test pattern on digital subchannel 13.2. The subchannel officially debuted at midnight on October 14, 2013, with Gannett assuming promotional and advertising control of "WBMN" from Cox Communications with the subsequent sign-on of WMAZ-TV digital subchannel 13.2. It remained available on Cox cable channel 3. The subchannel broadcasts in the 720p resolution format for high definition programming, rather than The CW's native 1080i format (a full 1080i feed of the channel is available to Cox subscribers).

== News operation ==
WMAZ-TV presently broadcasts 27 hours of locally produced newscasts each week (with four hours each weekday and three hours each on Saturdays and Sundays); in addition, the station produces five hours of newscasts each week (with one hour each weekday) for WMAZ-DT2. It has been the far-and-away market leader in Macon for as long as records have been kept. Not only did it essentially have the market to itself for its first 15 years on the air, but it was the only reliably viewable station in much of the market until cable television arrived in central Georgia in the early 1980s.

On November 4, 2011, WMAZ moved production of its newscasts to the set used by its legal advice program Law Call, with the normal red and black newsroom/control room backdrop. Three days later, on November 7, the station (via the Facebook page of then-morning anchor Stephanie Susskind) announced during its 5 p.m. newscast that it would be upgrading its news production to HD in the coming weeks. Ten days later, on November 17, 2011, WMAZ-TV became the second television station (after Warner Robins–based WRWR-LD (channel 38), which had debuted its newscasts on September 17, 2010, in the format) and the first full power station in the Macon market to begin broadcasting its local newscasts in high definition. With the launch of WMAZ-DT2 on October 14, 2013, the station began producing a half-hour weekday morning newscast (airing at 7 a.m.) and a half-hour prime time newscast at 10 p.m. for the subchannel.

On April 18, 2018, WMAZ dropped the Eyewitness name from the newscast's title that it had used since the early 1980s to coincide with the switch to the new Tegna standardized music and graphics package. The newscasts are now identified as 13 WMAZ News.

=== Notable former on-air staff ===
- Vanessa Echols – reporter (1983–1987)
- Joel Godard – weather anchor (early 1970s)
- Phil Keating – reporter (1990)
- David Lloyd – intern (1986)
- Scott McGrew (1991–1993)
- Maureen O'Boyle – morning anchor/reporter (1982–1987)

== Subchannels ==
The station's signal is multiplexed:

Subchannels of WMAZ-TV
Subchannel	Res.	Short name	Programming
13.1	1080i	WMAZ-TV	CBS
13.2	720p	WMAZTV2	The CW Plus
13.3	480i	Crime	True Crime Network (4:3)
13.4	480i	QUEST	Quest
13.5	480i	NEST	The Nest
13.6	480i	TBD	Busted
