= WBNM =

WBNM may refer to:

- WBNM-LD, a low-power television station (channel 25, virtual 50) licensed to serve Louisville, Kentucky, United States
- WBAC-LP, a low-power radio station (101.5 FM) licensed to serve Belmont, North Carolina, United States, which held the call sign WBNM-LP in 2017
- WFXO (AM), a radio station (1050 AM) licensed to serve Alexander City, Alabama, United States, which held the call sign WBNM from 2008 to 2016
- WXJO, a radio station (1120 AM) licensed to serve Douglasville, Georgia, United States, which held the call sign WBNM from 1990 to 2000
