= Multimedia, Inc. =

American media company (1968–1995)

- Type: Public
- Industry: Media
- Founded: January 1, 1968; 58 years ago
- Defunct: December 4, 1995; 30 years ago
- Fate: Acquired by Gannett Co. (television counterpart sold to Universal Studios in 1996; cable TV counterpart sold to Cox Communications in 2000); Assets now existing as part of USA Today Co. and Nexstar Media Group
- Headquarters: Greenville, South Carolina
- Key people: Craig A. Dubow (chairman, president & CEO)
- Products: Newspapers, television, and Internet media
- Number of employees: 49,675

Multimedia, Inc. was a media company that owned 12 daily newspapers, 49 weekly newspapers, two radio stations, five television stations, and a cable television system division. The company was headquartered in Greenville, South Carolina.

== History ==
Multimedia's origins can be traced to December 1932, when the News-Piedmont Company of Greenville, which published the Greenville News and Greenville Piedmont newspapers, acquired radio station WFBC only weeks after the station relocated to Greenville from Knoxville, Tennessee. In November 1953 the News-Piedmont Co. acquired majority ownership of the Asheville Citizen and Asheville Times and its wholly owned radio station, WWNC. WFBC-TV, the News and Piedmont's television station, signed on from Greenville at the end of 1953.

The News-Piedmont Co. would expand its broadcast holdings with the acquisitions of WBIR-AM-FM-TV in Knoxville in 1961, and of the Southeastern Broadcasting Company, which owned WMAZ-AM-FM-TV in Macon, Georgia, in 1963. Then, in September 1967 the three commonly owned companies announced that, pending approval by the Federal Communications Commission (FCC), they would merge by January 1, 1968, taking on the Multimedia, Inc. name. At the time Multimedia consisted of the Asheville and Greenville newspapers, three television stations and seven radio stations.

The company's most significant acquisitions came in 1976, when it purchased several properties from Cincinnati-based Avco, which was liquidating its media holdings. Multimedia first bought Avco's flagship television station, WLWT in Cincinnati. Later in the year Multimedia acquired Avco Program Sales, the syndication division which produced the nationally distributed Phil Donahue Show and a regionally-distributed program produced at WLWT, The Bob Braun 50-50 Club; this division would be renamed Multimedia Program Sales.

The company was involved in one of the more unusual media transactions in history. In 1983, it sold its flagship television station, WFBC-TV in Greenville (now WYFF) and WXII-TV in Winston-Salem, North Carolina, to Pulitzer, Inc. In return, Multimedia received Pulitzer's former flagship television station, KSDK in St. Louis. Multimedia used its new purchase as the testing ground for a new show hosted by Sally Jessy Raphael.

General Electric's NBC unit considered buying the company in 1995, but a deal never materialized. Instead, on July 24, 1995, the Gannett Company announced that it had entered into an agreement to acquire Multimedia for $1.7 billion, plus $539 million in long-term debt. The merger was approved by the FCC in November 1995 and was completed a month later, on December 4. In November 1996, Gannett sold Multimedia Entertainment to MCA subsidiary of Seagram. In July 1999, the cable television division, Multimedia Cablevision -- serving 522,000 customers across Kansas, Oklahoma and North Carolina -- was sold for $2.7 billion in cash to Cox Communications. The North Carolina systems were resold to Suddenlink Communications in 2006.

The Multimedia name lives on as a holding company and licensee within what is now Nexstar Media Group's corporate structure (after its acquisition of Tegna Inc. in 2026). Productions under Multimedia Entertainment continued on into NBCUniversal Syndication Studios, and are now controlled and distributed by NBCUniversal.

== Former stations ==
- Stations are arranged in alphabetical order by state and city of license.
- Two boldface asterisks appearing following a station's call letters (**) indicate a station built and signed on by a predecessor company of Multimedia.

Stations owned by Multimedia
Media market	State	Station	Purchased	Sold	Notes
Little Rock	Arkansas	KAAY	1975	1985	
Little Rock	Arkansas	KLPQ-FM	1976	1985	
Macon	Georgia	WMAZ	1963	1995	
Macon	Georgia	WMAZ-FM	1963	1995	(Note: Known as WAYS from 1984 onward.)
Macon	Georgia	WMAZ-TV	1963	1995	
Louisville	Kentucky	WAKY	1975	1985	
Louisville	Kentucky	WVEZ	1980	1985	
Shreveport	Louisiana	KEEL	1975	1994	
Shreveport	Louisiana	KMBQ-FM	1975	1994	(Note: Known as KITT from 1986 onward.)
St. Louis	Missouri	KSDK	1983	1995	
Asheville	North Carolina	WWNC	1953	1987	
Winston-Salem	North Carolina	WXII-TV	1972	1983	
Cincinnati	Ohio	WLWT	1976	1995	
Cleveland	Ohio	WKYC-TV	1990	1995	
Greenville	South Carolina	WFBC **	1932	1995	
Greenville	South Carolina	WFBC-FM **	1947	1995	
Greenville	South Carolina	WFBC-TV **	1954	1983	
Spartanburg	South Carolina	WORD	1989	1994	
Knoxville	Tennessee	WBIR	1961	1980	
Knoxville	Tennessee	WBIR-FM	1961	1980	
Knoxville	Tennessee	WBIR-TV	1960	1995	
Nashville	Tennessee	WZTV	1979	1988	
Milwaukee	Wisconsin	WEZW	1978	1994	
