= List of Late Night with Conan O'Brien characters =

The following is a list of characters on the late night program Late Night with Conan O'Brien, which aired on NBC from 1993 to 2009.

== Characters ==
- A-hole Ronald
- Andy's Little Sister
- Artie Kendall's Ghost
- Awareness Del (Making People Aware of Delaware)
- Awful Sports Chanter
- Cactus Chef Playing "We Didn't Start the Fire" on the Flute.
- Camel Toe Annie
- Coked Up Werewolf
- Conando
- Crooner Ghost Arnie Kendall
- The Dancing Gorillas
- Dudez-a-Plenti
- The Dunking Munchkin Covered with Dunkin Munchkins
- Emergency Guest
- Euro Guy
- Evil Puppy
- FaGriffin
- The FedEx Pope
- Fidel Castro Rabbit DJ
- Gaseous Wiener
- Ginger
- Grifgotta
- Gun-toting, NASCAR Driving Jesus
- The Guy Who’s Protected From Three Inch Bees
- The Guy Whose Proud That MIT Doesn't Have a Basketball Team
- Hannigan, The Traveling Salesman
- The Heckler
- Hippie Fire Hydrant Riding a Skateboard
- Horny Manatee
- Jeremy and Ira
- Kloppy the Horse
- Little Jay Leno
- The Loser
- Mansy, half man-half pansy
- Man with bulletproof legs
- Masturbating Bear
- MC Scared-of-Beez
- Money shot Lincoln
- Mr. Peanut with an Inner Ear Disorder
- "No Reason to Live" Guy
- Carl "Oldy" Olson
- Oscillating Air Purifier that Looks Like Slash
- Pimpbot 5000
- Polly the NBC Peacock
- The Potato Judge
- Preparation H Raymond
- The Pubes Guy
- Quackers the S*** Eating Duck
- Quake Guy
- R2-Mr. T2
- Redneck Parking Meter Eating Nachos out of a Roman Coliseum
- Reverse Briss
- Robot on a Toilet
- Sears Tower in Sears Clothing
- The Sexual Harassing Skeleton
- Seven-Foot Groucho
- Shoeverine
- S&M Lincoln
- Stealthy Frankenstein
- Suicidal Cow
- Ted Kennedy Passed Out on a Bean Bag
- The Interrupter
- The Really Tall Dachshund
- The Reverend Otis K. Dribbles
- Triumph the Insult Comic Dog
- Tomari
- Vomiting Kermit

== See also ==
- List of Late Night with Conan O'Brien sketches
