= Late Night with Conan O'Brien =

American late-night talk show (1993–2009)

- Also known as: Late Night (franchise brand)
- Genre: Late-night talk show; Variety show
- Created by: David Letterman; Conan O'Brien; Lorne Michaels
- Developed by: Lorne Michaels
- Starring: Conan O'Brien; Andy Richter (sidekick)
- Announcer: Joel Godard
- Music by: Max Weinberg and The Max Weinberg 7
- Composers: Opening theme: Howard Shore and John Lurie; Closing theme: "Cornell Knowledge" by Jimmy Vivino
- Country of origin: United States
- Original language: English
- No. of seasons: 16
- No. of episodes: 2,725 (list of episodes)

Production
- Executive producers: Lorne Michaels; Jeff Ross
- Production locations: Studio 6A, NBC Studios, New York, New York
- Camera setup: Multi-camera
- Running time: 42–43 minutes
- Production companies: Broadway Video; Conaco (2001–2009); Universal Media Studios (Note: Credited as NBC Productions (1993–1996), NBC Studios (1996–2004) and NBC Universal Television Studio (2004–2007).)

Original release
- Network: NBC
- Release: September 13, 1993 – February 20, 2009

Related
- The Tonight Show with Conan O'Brien; Conan

Late Night with Conan O'Brien is an American television talk show broadcast by NBC. The show is the second installment of the Late Night franchise originally established by David Letterman. Hosted by Conan O'Brien, it aired from September 13, 1993, to February 20, 2009, replacing Late Night with David Letterman and was replaced by Late Night with Jimmy Fallon. The show featured varied comedic material, celebrity interviews, and musical and comedy performances. Late Night aired weeknights at 12:37 am Eastern/11:37 pm Central in the United States. From 1993 until 2000, Andy Richter served as O'Brien's sidekick; following his departure, O'Brien was the show's sole featured performer. The show's house musical act was The Max Weinberg 7 and led by E Street Band drummer Max Weinberg.

In 2004, as part of a deal to secure a new contract, NBC announced that O'Brien would leave Late Night in 2009 to succeed Jay Leno as the host of The Tonight Show. Jimmy Fallon began hosting his version of Late Night on March 2, 2009.

== History ==
=== Replacing David Letterman ===
Upon Johnny Carson's May 1991 announcement of his 30-year hosting tenure on The Tonight Show ending in a year, NBC released a statement that Jay Leno (Carson's guest-host since 1987) would become Carson's replacement, not David Letterman. Though revealed two weeks after Carson's retirement announcement, the decision to go with Leno rather than Letterman had reportedly already been made for a long time, primarily by two of the top executives in NBC's Entertainment division: its president Warren Littlefield and his close collaborator John Agoglia. NBC later said that Letterman's high ratings for Late Night were the reason they kept him where he was. Letterman was bitterly disappointed and angry at not having been given The Tonight Show job; and, at Carson's advice, he left NBC after eleven years on Late Night. CBS signed Letterman to host his own show opposite The Tonight Show. Letterman moved his show to CBS virtually unchanged, taking most of the staff, skits, and comedy formats with him. However, NBC owned the rights to the Late Night name, forcing Letterman to rename his show Late Show with David Letterman.

Keeping the Late Night name, NBC set about building a whole new show in the 12:30 a.m. time slot, from which the network had been making some $20 million to $30 million a year towards the end of Letterman's tenure. NBC brought in Saturday Night Live executive producer Lorne Michaels to produce the new show, including selecting its host. After auditioning some lower-profile comedians, such as Jon Stewart, Drew Carey, and Paul Provenza, Michaels and the network started going after more established names like SNL star Dana Carvey and The Larry Sanders Show star Garry Shandling. Both eventually declined, with NBC reportedly making several approaches to Shandling.

Months into the process, Michaels auditioned Conan O'Brien, a then unknown Simpsons writer who had formerly written for Saturday Night Live. Reportedly, Michaels had originally considered hiring O'Brien as a producer for the new show, however, O'Brien then persuaded Michaels to give him a shot at being the host. Despite having "about 40 seconds" of television-performance experience as an occasional extra on Saturday Night Live sketches and briefly appearing in comedy bits on The Wilton North Report, O'Brien auditioned for the show on April 13, 1993. His guests were Jason Alexander and Mimi Rogers; the audition took place on the set of The Tonight Show with Jay Leno. NBC offered the show to O'Brien on April 26, and O'Brien made his first meaningful television appearance later that day when Leno introduced him on Tonight. In 2009, on the final episode of his 16-year run, O'Brien stated that he "owed his career to Lorne Michaels".

=== Debut ===
O'Brien's Late Night debuted on September 13, 1993, with Andy Richter chosen as O'Brien's sidekick. The premiere episode featured John Goodman, who received a "First Guest" medal for his appearance, Drew Barrymore, and Tony Randall with cameos from George Wendt and Bob Costas. The episode featured a cold open of O'Brien's walk to the studio with constant reminders that he was expected to live up to Letterman. Tom Brokaw makes a cameo, welcoming O'Brien to NBC but, doing as those on O'Brien's walk had done, warning him that he had "better be as good as Letterman, or else...", before menacingly crushing saltine crackers in front of O'Brien, appearing to be representative of the fate that awaited the new host if he failed to meet expectations. After seeming to be unaffected by the comments, O'Brien arrives at his dressing room and cheerfully prepares to hang himself. However, a warning that the show is about to start causes him to abandon his plans.

The show's first musical guest was English rock band Radiohead, who performed during the second episode. American singer-songwriter Jonathan Richman was the show's second musical guest.

O'Brien's inexperience was apparent, and the show was generally considered mediocre by critics in terms of hosting. The Chicago Sun-Times' Lon Grankhe called O'Brien "nervous, unprepared and generally geeky", and Tom Shales wrote "As for O'Brien, the young man is a living collage of annoying nervous habits. He giggles and titters, jiggles about and fiddles with his cuffs. He has dark, beady little eyes like a rabbit. He's one of the whitest white men ever." (O'Brien wrote for The New York Times a satirical review of the first episode the day it aired titled "O'Brien Flops!", in which he told readers "Frankly, I was not impressed".) The originality and quality of the comedy, however, led by original head writer Robert Smigel, was widely praised. Although O'Brien benefited by comparison from the quick critical and commercial failure of the fellow new late-night The Chevy Chase Show, NBC only offered short-term contracts, 13 weeks at a time and once for six weeks, as widely reported by the press at the time. O'Brien was reportedly almost fired at least once in this period, but NBC had no one to replace him. According to Smigel, "We were basically canceled at Conan, and then they changed their minds in August of '94, gave us a reprieve."

In an unusual form of advertising, Conan O'Brien's credits in The Simpsons "Treehouse of Horror IV" episode, originally aired on October 28, 1993 (and produced before O'Brien left the Simpsons writing staff to host Late Night), reference his new role as host of Late Night, including one credit that lists "Watch My Show" as his "middle" name. (All Simpsons "Treehouse of Horror" episodes credit the voice cast and crew under Halloween-associated nicknames, some being faux middle names in quotation marks.)

O'Brien: When I first got this job, I came here to 30 Rock …

Letterman: How did you get this job? Was it a theme-writing contest?

O'Brien: Yeah. It was "what would I do with a talk show…" And I was fourth.

— Letterman visits Late Night with Conan O'Brien, March 1, 1994

According to O'Brien, NBC network executive Warren Littlefield told him, with regard to Andy Richter, he'd "never succeed until I 'got rid of that big fat dildo.' That was the tone of the conversations between us and the network." It was widely expected that the host of Talk Soup, Greg Kinnear would take over the role, but Kinnear turned down the opportunity. (Kinnear would instead become host of Late Night's then-lead-out program, Later, in February 1994, remaining there for two years before deciding to pursue an acting career.) Stars like Tom Hanks agreed to appear on Late Night, which boosted audience awareness.

Even Letterman, who admired O'Brien's comic sensibility, appeared as a guest to register his support. According to O'Brien, Letterman's appearance was the catalyst that turned the show around. At first, the show's staff believed that Letterman's request to appear on the show was a prank, because, as O'Brien put it, Letterman "never goes on anyone else's show". Yet Letterman's show of support led others to start believing in O'Brien and, 22 years later when Letterman retired, O'Brien expressed his gratitude and stated that he owed his own late night career to Letterman.

In its first six months on the air, the show averaged 1.7 million viewers (1.8 rating) followed by slight improvements through the spring of 1994. By July and August of 1994, bumped by its college student core demographic being home on vacation, the average viewership stabilized at almost 1.9 million (2.0 rating). Also in August, NBC announced its decision to renew O'Brien's Late Night without specifying a time commitment for the renewal, only highlighting the network's "commitment to the success of the show as long as it demonstrated ratings improvement and creative growth".

One NBC affiliate, KPRC-TV in Houston, dropped Late Night with Conan O'Brien in September 1994 due to low ratings and replaced it with the syndicated Jenny Jones Show. KPRC reinstated O'Brien's Late Night in the fall of 1996, but scheduled it to air as late as 2:40 a.m.; over the next eight years, the station, in addition to The Jenny Jones Show, had aired various other first-run syndicated programs (Extra, Access Hollywood, Ricki Lake, Montel Williams and Inside Edition) and a rebroadcast of its 10:00 p.m. newscast between Leno and O'Brien after it reinstated Late Night. Houston became the subject of a 1997 skit (via classic remote piece) in which O'Brien made impromptu stops at Houston's central bus terminal and the Astrodome to watch an episode of his own show with Houstonians. In response to emails sent by O'Brien's fans following the skit regarding its graveyard placement, KPRC moved the show to 12:35 a.m. in 1998; it would eventually move Late Night to its network-assigned timeslot, immediately following The Tonight Show with Jay Leno, in 2004.

O'Brien's performance style improved through experience, and he began to receive more favorable reviews and ratings the following year. With the ratings gradually improving over the course of two years, Late Night reached a new level of critical and commercial success in 1996; Tom Shales wrote an article entitled "The Late Night Dawning of Conan", and O'Brien received his first Emmy nomination for writing, which he received every year until 2011.

=== 1996–2000 ===
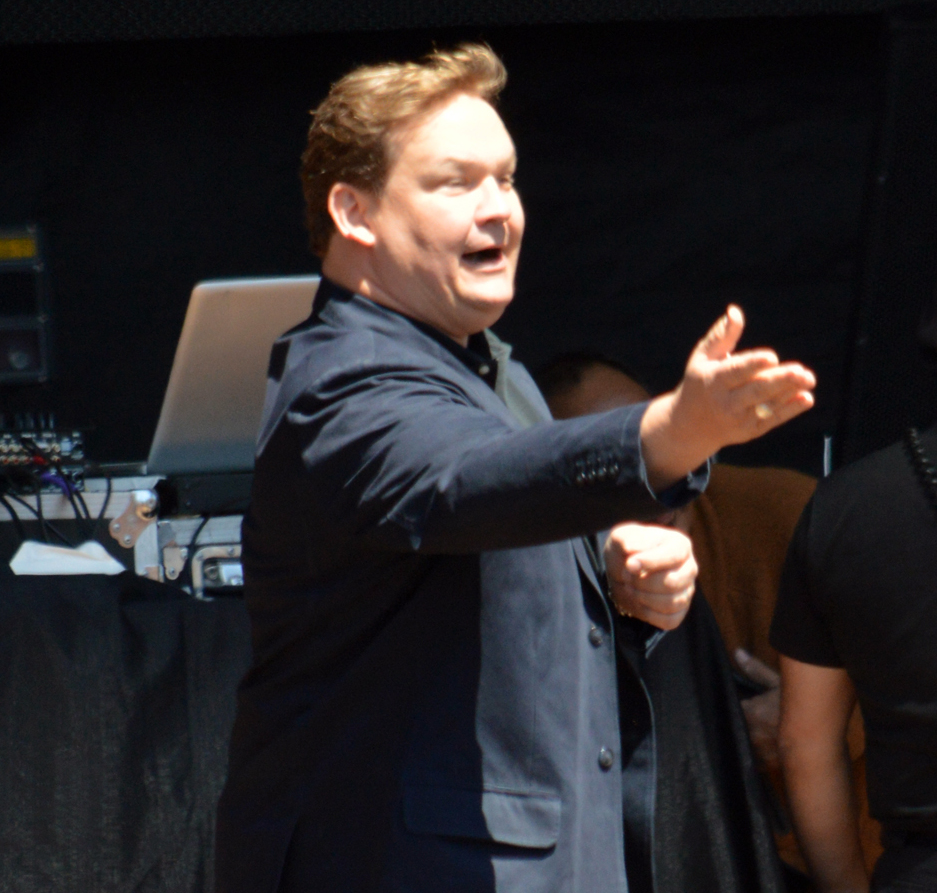
Andy Richter served as sidekick from 1993 to 2000. He eventually returned as announcer/sidekick for The Tonight Show with Conan O'Brien and later Conan.

In 2000, Richter left Late Night on good terms, to pursue his acting career, a move that emotionally affected O'Brien, as evidenced by Richter's last show. The show's comedy bits and banter had usually depended on O'Brien's interaction with Richter. O'Brien's wacky non-sequitur comedy became more pronounced as he played all of his comedy and commentary directly to the audience and Max Weinberg instead of towards Richter.

=== 2001–2009 ===
Conan O'Brien in the music video for The White Stripes' "The Denial Twist" (2005).

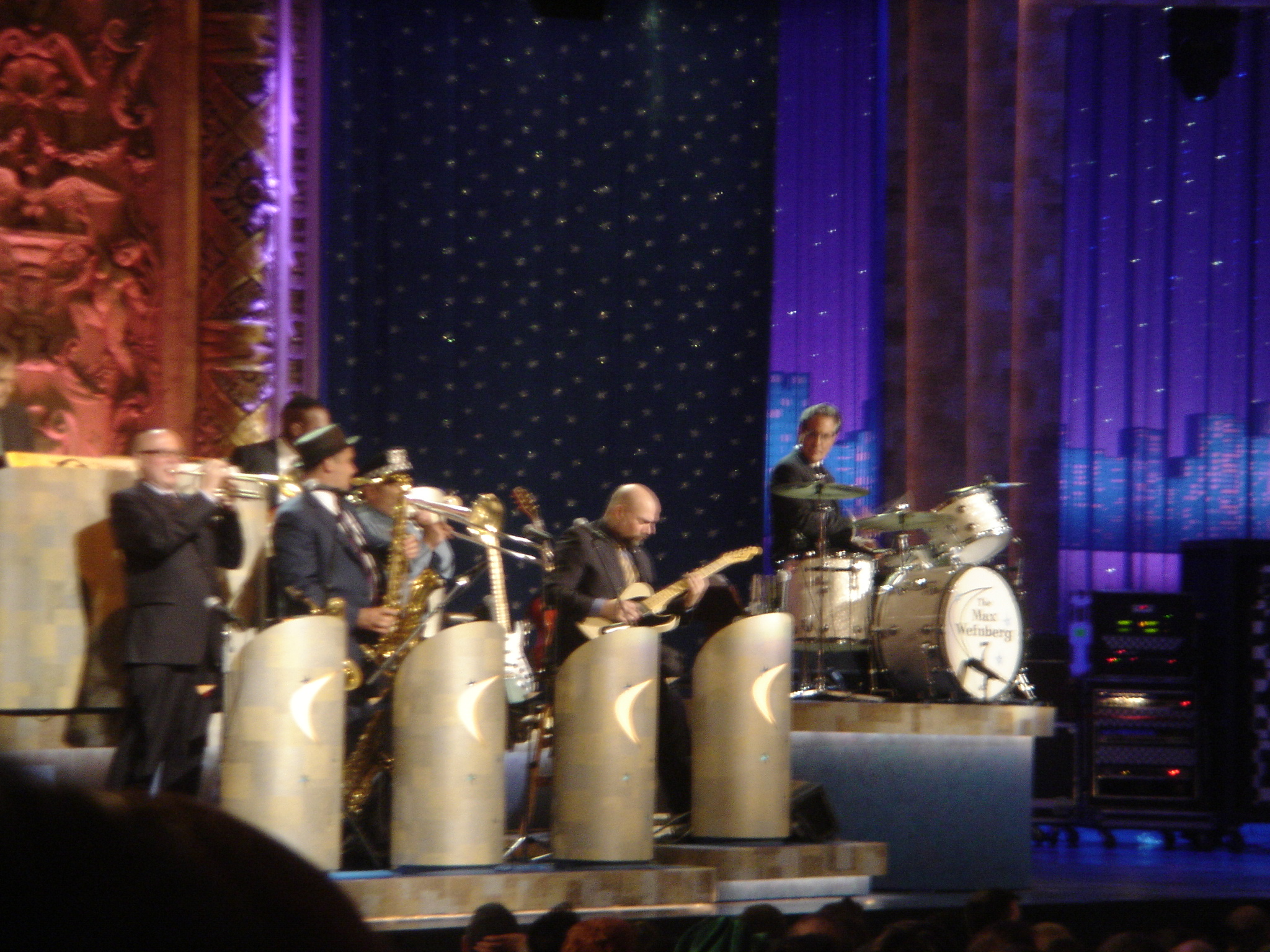
The Max Weinberg 7 during a taping of Late Night with Conan O'Brien in Chicago in 2006.

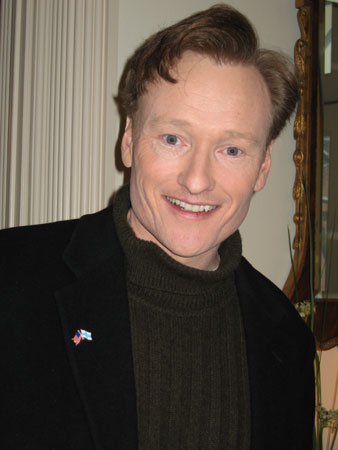
O'Brien in 2006

In early 2002, as his NBC contract was ending, O'Brien had notable offers from other networks; Fox was reported to have made particularly strong overtures, trying to interest him in an 11:00 p.m. show on the network by offering an exorbitant sum of as much as US$25 million per year. However, O'Brien decided to re-sign with NBC—joking that he initially wanted a 13-week deal (a nod to the time nine years earlier when the show had been posting low ratings)—thus extending his contract for four more years, with his annual NBC compensation reportedly doubling to nearly US$8 million a year. The extension would see him surpass Letterman's 11-year Late Night hosting run. Because O'Brien's early 2002 negotiations with NBC coincided with Letterman's Late Show contract with CBS coming up for renewal while rival ABC was making a serious run at Letterman in an attempt to lure him away, CBS made its own last minute approach to O'Brien as protection should Letterman decide to leave for ABC. However, reportedly out of admiration and respect for Letterman, O'Brien instructed his representatives not to bother engaging with CBS, reasoning in later interviews that he didn't want to be "the stick for CBS to hit Letterman with" or "the crowbar that CBS uses to get Letteman's [contract] number down" in Letterman's own negotiations with CBS.

With a new NBC contract and his Late Night doing well in the ratings, reportedly making the network almost US$35 million a year in profit on US$70 million annual revenue, O'Brien hosted the Primetime Emmy Awards ceremony in September 2002—a recognition of his rising prominence and success in show business. In interviews during summer 2002, 39-year-old O'Brien indicated that he doesn't see himself hosting Late Night beyond the end of his current contract in early 2006—expressing concerns about aging out of the show's sophomoric humour and silly antics by observing that "at a certain point it's like a 55-year-old man wearing short shorts".

In 2003, O'Brien's own production company, Conaco, was added as a producer of Late Night. The show celebrated its 10th anniversary, another milestone that O'Brien said he wanted to achieve with his 2002 contract. During the anniversary show, Mr. T handed O'Brien a chain with a large gold "7" on it.

O'Brien: But Mr. T, we've been on the air for ten years!
Mr. T: I know that, fool! But you only been funny for seven!

By spring 2004, with the show dominating the 12:30 a.m. time slot in U.S. national ratings, including reportedly making profits of US$100 million a year on annual revenues of US$140 million, O'Brien and his manager Gavin Polone began to talk publicly about the performer's desire of hosting an 11:30 p.m. late-night show as the next logical step career-wise. Naturally, their primary focus was for O'Brien to get The Tonight Show, still one of the most lucrative assets on American television, making an annual profit of about US$150 million on revenues of about US$230 million as of 2004 under its current host Jay Leno who had been maintaining its number one spot in U.S. late-night ratings since 1995. In March 2004, with NBC renewing Leno's Tonight Show contract for five more years until 2009, which O'Brien was reportedly surprised and disappointed with, Polone continued lobbying the network to commit to a formal plan of succession for O'Brien by leveraging future offers O'Brien was certain to receive from other networks in mid-2005 once becoming legally allowed to negotiate with outside entities.

For months during spring and summer of 2004, the NBC Universal Television Group president Jeff Zucker conducted reportedly complicated negotiations with O'Brien's representatives and Leno, in search of a mutually agreeable deal that would keep O'Brien at NBC. Finally, on the morning of September 27, 2004, at NBC's headquarters in Rockefeller Center, O'Brien signed a new deal with the network, guaranteeing him the hosting job of the Tonight Show starting from a yet-to-be-determined date in 2009 in addition to a guarantee of at least two years as host of the show from that point on. The agreement also meant that Leno's term on the Tonight Show would be ending at the completion of his current contract, which was to bring his hosting run on the show to 17 years. NBC announced the deal in a news release later that afternoon, after it had been announced to the staffs of both shows early in the morning.

O'Brien's last season on Late Night attracted an average of 1.98 million viewers, compared to 1.92 million viewers for The Late Late Show with Craig Ferguson.

== U.S. television ratings (late-night talk shows) ==
Season	Nielsen rank	Nielsen rating
1993–94	4	2.0
1994–95	3	2.2
1995–96	3	2.2
1996–97	4	2.5
1997–98	4	2.5
1998–99	4	2.5
1999–2000	4	2.5
2000–01	4	2.5
2001–02	3 (tied with Politically Incorrect)	2.5
2002–03	3	2.6
2003–04	3	2.6
2004–05	3	2.5
2005–06	3	2.5
2006–07	3	2.4
2007–08	3	2.0
2008–09	3	2.0

== Format ==
=== Humor ===
The show was known for its wacky and absurd sophomoric comedic sensibility that is edgier than most other talk shows. Like his Late Night predecessor, David Letterman, the show's humor also had a streak of biting sarcasm and irony. According to Robert Smigel, who served as head writer in 1993, the show's comedic approach was to focus on being different from David Letterman:

I set down a lot of rules, some of which were crazy, but ultimately it forced us to come up with a lot of original stuff. We had the added bonus of being Letterman's replacement.

Typically O'Brien would play the 'straight man' role to the general absurdity of the comedy, treating the material or wacky nature of the sketches with sincerity. The show had an unusual quantity of comedy and original content rather than other talk shows such as Late Show with David Letterman or The Tonight Show with Jay Leno that relied heavily on recurring segments and 'found' humor. The show was particularly unique in the lack of 'found' humor to derive content from i.e. most content being scripted as opposed to Letterman's Small Town News or Jay Leno's headlines that used this "found humor". O'Brien would often playfully chide his audience for an underwhelming or overly enthusiastic response to his jokes.

Particularly in the early years, comedic sketches overtook all segments on the show, occasionally even interrupting guest interviews and O'Brien's monologue. Frequently sketches would randomly begin without introduction, such as during banter between Richter and O'Brien. A lot of the humor had a fantasy-like quality to it, where inanimate objects would talk or silly characters would disrupt the show. Sometimes a short story would emerge in these sketches with a resolution culminating in a song.

One recurring technique is to superimpose lips onto an existing image, as in the Syncro-Vox limited animation technique, resulting in the speaker saying things often quite out of character.

Although Late Night used political humor, it did so far less frequently than competing shows did. During the 1996 and 2000 presidential election seasons, Late Night was found to be the least politically oriented late night program. It averaged 310 political jokes per election season, in contrast to the Leno-led Tonight Show with 1,275.

(See List of Late Night with Conan O'Brien sketches for an extensive list)

=== The Max Weinberg 7 ===
The show's house band was The Max Weinberg 7, led by drummer Max Weinberg. The other six members were Mark Pender on trumpet, Richie "LaBamba" Rosenberg on trombone, Mike Merritt on bass, Jerry Vivino on saxophone and brother Jimmy Vivino on guitar, and Scott Healy on keyboards. Weinberg sometimes took extended leaves of absence to tour with Bruce Springsteen as the drummer for the E Street Band (which happened in 1999-2000, 2002-2004 and 2007-08). During his absence, James Wormworth would typically fill in on drums, and the band was led by Vivino under the name Jimmy Vivino and the Max Weinberg 7.

With the departure of Andy Richter from Late Night in May 2000, Max Weinberg assumed a bigger role as an interlocutor for O'Brien's jokes. One common running gag was Max's awkwardness on camera and his apparent lack of chemistry with Conan. Weinberg was often used in sketches as well, which usually revolved around his purported sexual deviance (mostly a penchant for bedding barely legal groupies), although long-running sketches also spoofed Max's lack of knowledge of current affairs.

"LaBamba" was also used as the butt of many of Conan's jokes. These humorous sketches usually revolved around LaBamba's sizeable mustache, his poor acting skills, and his alleged inability to read written music. Mark Pender would often sing songs on the topic of a current event which ended with him screeching uncontrollably and climbing the risers into the audience. All members of the 7 have had successful side careers as studio musicians.

==== Theme song and other music ====
The show's opening theme was co-written by composer Howard Shore and John Lurie (of the band The Lounge Lizards). Lurie would later say that he was contracted by Shore to write the theme, and after he turned in the piece, Shore made minimal changes and claimed an unwarranted co-writing credit. Lurie also claimed to have been a finalist for Late Night's band leader position, but said producers told him, "Conan thinks you're funnier than him and that scares him."

As is common in the talk show format, the Max Weinberg 7 performed the show's opening and closing themes, played bumpers into and out of commercial breaks (they actually played through the entire break for the studio audience), and a short piece during O'Brien's crossover to his desk after his monologue. The show's closing theme was called "Cornell Knowledge", and was lifted from Jerry and Jimmy Vivino's first album together. However, on Late Night, it was played at a much quicker tempo than the album version. The band also played a wide variety of songs as bumpers coming to and from commercial breaks and introducing guests—usually popular music from a variety of eras.

=== Joel Godard ===
Joel Godard, a long-time announcer for NBC shows, was the program's announcer and a frequent comedy contributor. On the show's final episode, Conan noted that Godard was originally hired to simply announce the show's intro and claimed "nobody thought you'd ever see him"; however, he was gradually worked into the show's comedy pieces. These bits usually revolved around Godard's supposed homosexual fetishes, deviant sexual habits, substance abuse, and suicidal tendencies. The humor came in part from Godard's delivery. No matter how depressing or deviant the topic being discussed was, he always did so in an exaggeratedly cheerful voice and with a huge smile plastered on his face. Several sketches ended with Godard apparently committing suicide in his announcer's booth. When Andy Richter left the show in 2000, Godard began to appear in sketches more frequently.

=== Writing staff ===
In the first few seasons of the show, the writing staff consisted of several now-prolific comics including Robert Smigel as the head writer, Bob Odenkirk, Louis C.K., Tommy Blacha and Dino Stamatopoulos. Smigel left his position as head writer of the show in 1995 but continued to appear on the show to do bits as Triumph the Insult Comic Dog and the 'Satellite Interviews'. Jonathan Groff took over his position until replaced by Mike Sweeney in 2001.

Members of the show's writing staff frequently appeared in sketches on the show. Among the most prolific were: Brian McCann (Preparation H Raymond, FedEx Pope, The Loser, Airsick Moth, Jerry Butters, Awesome Dave, Funhole Guy, Bulletproof Legs Guy, Adrian "Raisin" Foster, S&M Lincoln, etc.), Brian Stack (Hannigan the Traveling Salesman, Artie Kendall the Ghost Crooner, The Interrupter, Kilty McBagpipes, Fan-tastic Guy, Clive Clemmons, Frankenstein, Ira, Slipnut Brian, etc.), Jon Glaser (Segue Sam, Pubes, Awareness Del, Wrist Hulk, Ahole Ronald, Gorton's Fisherman, Jeremy, Slipnut Jon, etc.), Kevin Dorff (Coked-up Werewolf, Jesus Christ, Mansy the half-man/half-pansy, Joe's Bartender, Todd the Tiny Guy, etc.), and Andy Blitz (Awful Ballgame Chanter, Vin Diesel's brother Leonard Diesel, Slipnut Andy, Chuck Aloo aka the star of the 24 spin-off series 60). Blitz went so far as to travel to India for one bit in which he carried his computer through the streets of India to get technical support firsthand from the telephone representative at NBC's technical help center.

Several writing staff interns have gone on to become noted actors or writers including Vanessa Bayer, John Krasinski, Mindy Kaling, Ellie Kemper and Jack McBrayer.

=== Sketch actors and cameo appearances ===
Late Night employed a number of sketch actors, many of whom were frequently reused in different roles in different episodes. Several years before joining the cast of Saturday Night Live, and before playing the role of Leslie Knope on another NBC TV show, Parks and Recreation, Amy Poehler often appeared as a regular in many sketches, though she was best remembered for playing the recurring role of Andy Richter's Conan-obsessed teenage sister, Stacy. Other notable comedians such as Jack McBrayer, Rob Riggle, Rob Corddry, H. Jon Benjamin, Ellie Kemper, Bobby Moynihan, Matt Besser, Ian Roberts, Matt Walsh and Andrew Daly also frequently appeared as sketch actors on the show for several years. Triumph the Insult Comic Dog (created and voiced by original head writer Robert Smigel) began as part of a sketch on Late Night. Celebrities such as Joyce Brothers, Nipsey Russell, Abe Vigoda, James Lipton, Bob Saget and William Preston as the character Carl 'Oldy' Olsen also made frequent cameo appearances in comedy sketches on the show at different periods. One of the show's graphic designers, Pierre Bernard, was featured in several sketches, such as "Pierre Bernard's Recliner of Rage" and "Nerding It Up For Pierre".

Celebrity guests of the night would also occasionally appear in sketches either during their interviews or during the earlier comedy segments, e.g. in "In the year 2000" (which always included the participation of a celebrity guest after Andy Richter left the show) or a sketch where Conan would pretend to write in his diary while an attractive female guest was there. Quite rare for a talk show, sometimes interviews began normally but turned into sketches with both the guest and Conan participating, usually when the guest was a "friend of the show."

=== Costumed characters ===
Unusual for a late night talk show, Late Night made frequent use of various costumed characters such as The Masturbating Bear, Robot on a Toilet, and Pimpbot 5000. The humor in these sketches often derived from the crude construction of the characters' costumes as well as the absurdist nature of their conceptions. For example, Pimpbot 5000 was a 1950s-style robot who dressed and acted in the manner of an exaggerated blaxploitation pimp, while The Masturbating Bear was a man in a bear costume wearing an oversized diaper who would invariably begin to fondle himself to the tune of Aram Khachaturian's "Sabre Dance" when brought on stage. Many of these characters did little more in their appearances than walk across the stage or be wheeled out from behind the curtain, but some had extensive sketches on the show.

== Appearances in other shows ==
The show made a cameo appearance in the Sesame Street special Elmopalooza, where Conan was interviewing two aliens while Big Bird was passing by them carrying a video tape.

The show also made an appearance on The Simpsons in the episode "Bart Gets Famous", where Conan interviews a now famous Bart.

== Production ==
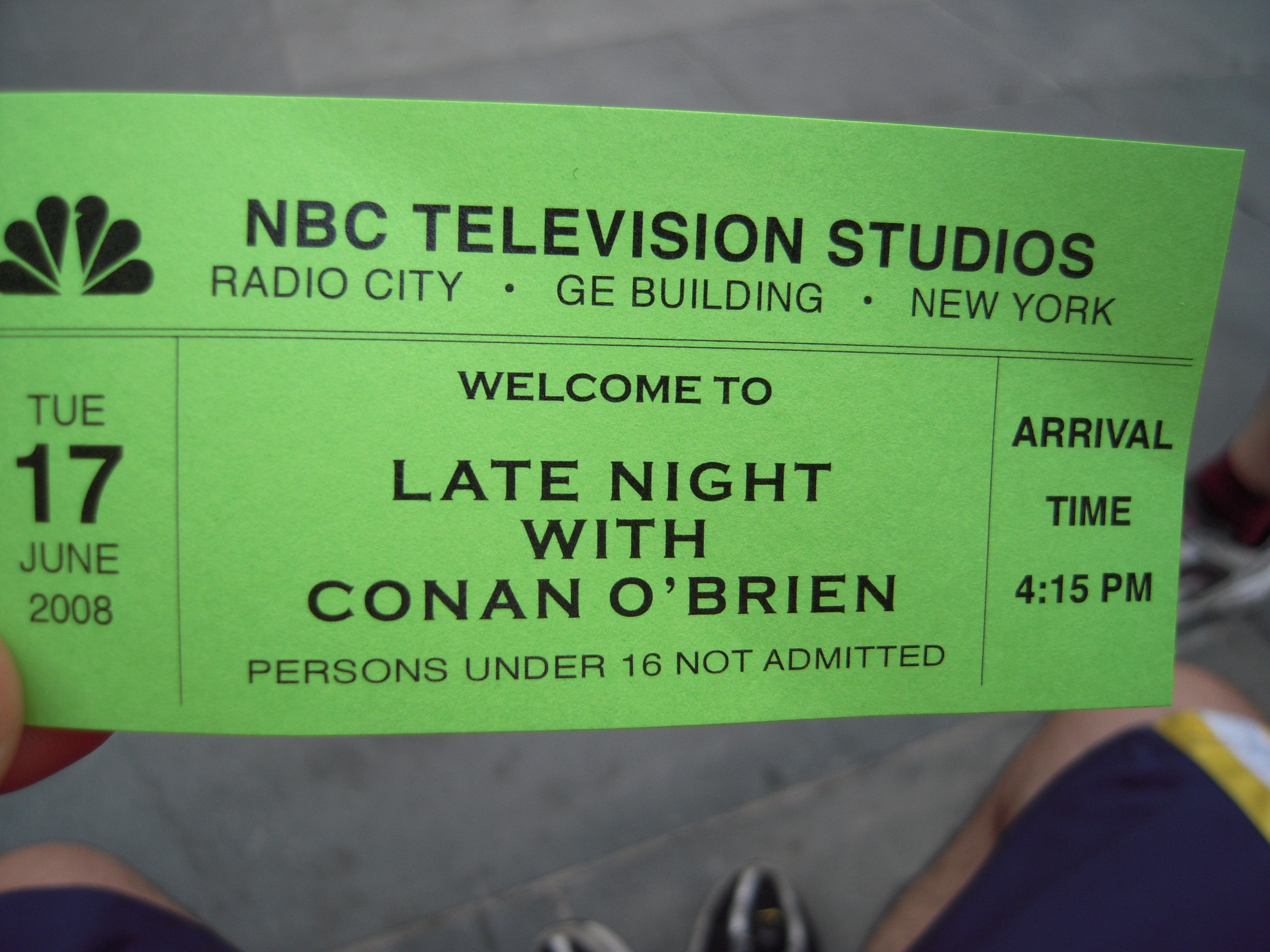
A ticket to the show

Late Night was a production of Lorne Michaels's Broadway Video (and, since 2003, O'Brien's Conaco). It was taped in Studio 6A in the GE Building at 30 Rockefeller Plaza in New York City. Next to the door were framed pictures of Letterman, Carson, Jack Paar and Steve Allen, each of whose groundbreaking late-night shows originated from studio 6A or 6B (where The Tonight Show Starring Jimmy Fallon is currently taped). The studio holds just over 200 audience members. It was taped at about 5:30 pm as an uninterrupted hour-long program, with the band playing music through the portions that would be filled by commercials. Generally, shows were taped at 5:30 pm Monday through Friday, although for much of the show's run, reruns would be aired on Mondays and the show would not tape that day.

The show's format consisted of an opening monologue from O'Brien, followed by various "desk bits". These generally included several brief sketches, recurring segments, or some other form of comedy. Typically O'Brien would play the 'straight man' role to the general absurdity of the comedy, treating the material or wacky nature of the sketches with sincerity. In the show's second and fourth segments, O'Brien interviewed two celebrity guests, between which, in the third segment, O'Brien listed the next night's/week's guests. There was often a comedy bit as well during this segment. The show's fifth segment was usually reserved for a musical or stand-up comedy performance, or occasionally another guest interview. The show's final segment was usually a quick "goodnight" and the closing credits, which sometimes featured part of a bit from earlier in the show. Quite rare for a talkshow, frequently comedy segments would also spill into the interviews, typically when a guest was a 'friend' of the show.

During the live tapings, and prior to the show, there was an audience warm-up, during which the audience watched a montage of highlights from the show, and staff writer Brian McCann greeted the audience (this task was formerly undertaken by head writer Mike Sweeney). McCann delivered a few jokes, told the audience what to expect, and finally introduced the band and then O'Brien. O'Brien then thanked the audience for coming, meeting as many audience members as he could. He would often then do a musical number with the band to pump up the audience ("Burning Love" was one standard). After the show was finished taping, O'Brien sang the "End of the Show Song", which never aired on Late Night, although in February 2009, a short video of it was posted on Late Night Underground. The End of the Show Song finally did reach air on January 21, 2010, his penultimate show as Tonight Show host. It also was aired on the March 29, 2012 episode of Conan. The tradition of singing The End of the Show Song has continued, un-aired as usual, on Conan.

=== Broadcast ===
O'Brien poking fun at the show's new HDTV widescreen format

Late Night began broadcasting in 1080i ATSC on April 26, 2005, with a downscaled letterboxed NTSC simulcast (unlike The Tonight Show, whose NTSC simulcast is fullscreen). O'Brien celebrated the conversion to the widescreen HDTV format with jokes throughout the week.

On December 6, 2005 Late Night with Conan O'Brien segments began selling on the iTunes Store. Most segments were priced at $1.99, as were most episodes of other shows, with "special" best-ofs and other longer segments priced at $9.99. In December, 2007 NBC stopped selling all its television shows on iTunes, but the network returned it to iTunes in September 2008 after NBC and Apple worked out a new agreement. The show was offered free at Hulu.com and the NBC website but has been unavailable on the Internet since the 2010 Tonight Show conflict. However, in May 2018, O'Brien and TBS, announced they would partner with NBC to make his entire Late Night archives available online, marking the 25th anniversary of O'Brien's late night debut.

=== Set design ===
O'Brien's Late Night had three long-term permanent sets, but retained the basic structure used when Letterman occupied Studio 6A: the performance space at the viewer's left, and the desk area, to the viewer's right, where interviews were done. O'Brien did his monologue in the performance area, emerging at the start of each episode from the area where musical guests perform. The Max Weinberg 7 were in the corner made by the stage-right wall and the wall in front of the audience. The desk area had a desk for O'Brien, a chair and couch(es) to the viewer's left for guests (and originally Andy Richter), and a coffee table.

Primarily, set changes involved the background behind the desk and chair and couch. The original set, used from the show's debut in 1993 until August 6, 1996, was primarily yellow, and the desk background resembled the living room of a New York City apartment, with windows that looked out at a Manhattan backdrop; it was modeled after Lorne Michaels' office. For years afterwards, O'Brien mocked this original set, particularly its "mustard color". The two subsequent set designs featured darker blues and violets to emulate the feel of nighttime, with the final set featuring a balcony railing in front of a backdrop with the view from the top of Rockefeller Center. This set debuted on September 4, 2001, and necessitated changes almost instantly as its backdrop view of New York City contained the World Trade Center, which was destroyed a week later. A special curtain was used to obstruct the towers until October, when the curtain became a permanent part of the set design even after the backdrop was altered. During his final week of episodes, Conan took an axe to parts of the set, giving it out to audience members as souvenirs, not wanting to allow it to simply be thrown away.

== Special episodes ==
=== Remote pieces and episodes shot on location ===
Remote pieces shot on location were a recurring staple on Late Night, but occasionally, entire episodes were shot on location, usually during sweeps months. The first vacation for the show was a week-long stint of shows in Los Angeles the week of November 9–12, 1999. This was the only location week for the show while Andy Richter was with the show, and the only time the show's theme was altered for the week, with a more surf-style version of the show's normal theme (though the Toronto shows ended the normal theme with a piece of "O Canada"). The show was broadcast from NBC's L.A. studios (NBC Studios Burbank) and an L.A.-themed set was built, very similar in layout to the New York set.

From February 10–13, 2004, Late Night broadcast from the Elgin Theatre in Toronto, Canada. The guests for these episodes were all Canadians (with the exception of Adam Sandler), and included such stars as Jim Carrey and Mike Myers. As the show was taped at a theater, unlike the trip to L.A., the set built was not like the show's standard set.

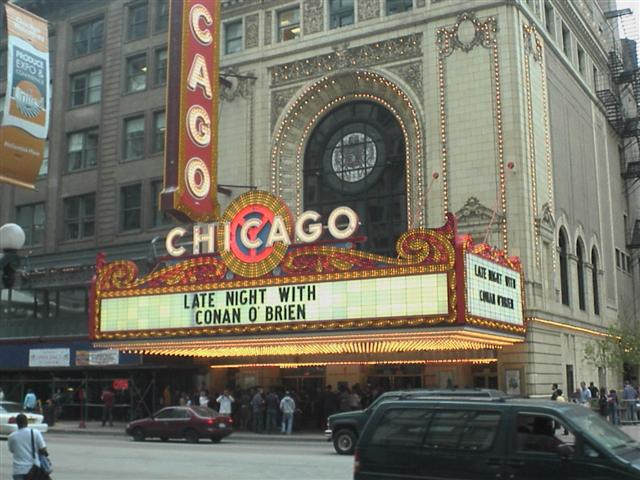
Chicago Theatre during Conan's week of shows there

From May 9–12, 2006, the show made a similar venture to the Chicago Theatre in Chicago, Illinois, taking cues from their previous trip to Toronto. Between April 30 – May 4, 2007, the show originated from the Orpheum Theatre in San Francisco.

In a sketch called "Conan O'Brien Hates My Homeland", Conan mocked every nation in the world to see which ones he gets letters from. An announcer on the Finnish entertainment channel SubTV, which airs the show a couple of days after it is aired in the US, asked people to defend Finland before Conan got to insult it, and the viewers in Finland began sending mail before the bit had even gotten to the letter F. Conan responded by assuming the Finnish "just couldn't wait" to be insulted and officially insulted Finland in the segment. An overwhelming number of postcards were supposedly received, which apparently "forced" Conan to give Finland a formal apology. Conan then went as far as to have the flag of Finland shown in the background during a speech and slandered the Finns' "hated" neighbor Sweden with a sign saying "Sweden Sucks!" printed over the flag of Sweden. It would seem that this chain of events led to elevated ratings in Finland and subsequently also sparked a special relationship with the viewers in Finland. Later when Conan was talking to audience members before the show, a group of fans visiting from Finland commented that he resembled their female president Tarja Halonen. Conan mentioned the resemblance on his show, even showing pictures of Halonen next to himself. When he discovered that Halonen was up for reelection he began making satirical commercials in support of Halonen and vowed to travel to Finland to meet her if she won re-election. When she did indeed win re-election in January 2006, Conan traveled to Finland and met with her. One episode, broadcast on March 10, 2006, was compiled mainly of footage from O'Brien's trip to Finland. In the episode, Conan greeted fans at the airport, participated in a Sami cultural ceremony, appeared on a Finnish talk show, and attempted to visit a fan who had written to him. The episode was not strictly taped as a live episode there, however, but was prefaced by an introduction by O'Brien taped in New York. The Finland episode came as the culmination of a long-running joke on the show.

Aside from location shows, the show also did special one-shots in its early years. In 1995, one episode of the show was taped aboard a New York City ferry in New York Harbor. Dubbed "The Show on a Boat" by the showtunes-style song-and-dance number performed by a trio of "sailors" at the start of the show, O'Brien, Richter, the band and guests were all crammed onto the deck of the ferry. The show was taped at its normal afternoon time, while it was still light out.

=== Technical and production difficulties ===
A more unexpected shoot occurred on October 10, 1996, when a five-alarm fire in Rockefeller Plaza rendered the 6A studios out of commission for the remainder of that week. The fire occurred on early Thursday morning, which left O'Brien's staff precious little time to assemble a show elsewhere. Pressed for time as 12:35 approached, O'Brien taped the show outside, after dark, despite the cold weather, on a makeshift set with the Prometheus statue and 30 Rock serving as a backdrop. Furthering the unfortunate nature of the evening's circumstances was the final guest, Julie Scardina, who brought along wild animals, including birds that Conan explained had to be kept tied up, as they could not be freed outside. Earlier in the show, O'Brien and Richter walked into Brookstone (located in the lobby of Rockefeller Center), camera crew in tow, and bought a massaging leather recliner for the first guest, Samuel L. Jackson. The second of the two "fire shows", on Friday night, was taped in the Today Show studio, which was not affected by the fire, though the East L.A. rock band Los Lobos performed in the blustery wind a song from their newest album Colossal Head.

During the Northeast blackout of 2003, O'Brien and the staff taped a short 10-minute introduction explaining that the episode they had planned would not be taking place due to the blackout. Studio 6A was powered by a generator and lit by battery-powered floodlights. A standby show was aired in-progress after the intro. One of the scheduled guests that night, The Dandy Warhols, commandeered the studio's green room, where they stayed until they performed on the show the next night.

=== Gimmick episodes ===
Other shows that were taped in the regular 6A studio were augmented by special gimmicks:

A lot of high-concept gimmick episodes were done in the early years of the show, such as a 1995 show done entirely on a boat of the circle line or "Time Travel Week", four episodes from early 1996, where Conan and Andy (and the rest of the crew) "time-traveled" to a different point in time each night. Times and locations included The Civil War, Ancient Greece, The future, and The early '80s (featuring a cameo by David Letterman in the cold open, who occupied Conan's studio in 1983, cruelly brushing off Conan and Andy's attempt at explaining their presence in Letterman's dressing room by saying, "Why don't you two fellas go find a nice, warm place to screw yourselves? Security!").

In 1997, a special episode was taped in which the studio audience was composed solely of grade-school age children, primarily 5–10 years of age. Conan interacted with the children, encouraging them to laugh and cheer to keep away the boredom monster.

The October 18, 2002 episode was re-shot entirely in clay animation nearly seven months after its first airing, including the opening credits and commercial bumpers. The episode's originally broadcast soundtrack was retained while the visuals were reproduced to mirror the original footage in a small-scale reproduction of the studio 6A.

On October 31, 2006, a similarly conceptualized Halloween episode was created from an episode which originally aired in May and featured Larry King, among other guests. Using a process the show called "Skelevision", all the visuals were re-shot with a Halloween motif, with human skeletons adorned with the clothing and accessories of the humans. This re-shoot was shot using the actual studio, and the puppeteers moved the skeletons with wires and cables while being visually obscured by green screen technology. Once again, the opening and bumpers were altered, this time including a model of a hearse winding through a foggy landscape and cemetery, and the voice of Bill Hader as Vincent Price in place of Joel Godard.

=== U2 exclusive ===
O'Brien interviewing U2 on Late Night

The October 5, 2005 episode of Late Night was devoted entirely to the band U2, marking the first time in the show's then 13-year run that it had devoted an entire show to a single guest. Jim Pitt, the talent executive in charge of booking acts for the show, remarked that in his 12 years of working for Late Night, U2 and Johnny Cash were the "dream artists" he'd tried, but never succeeded in getting. The band performed three songs, two more than the customary one song, then had a lengthy interview with Conan.

=== Episodes during the 2007–2008 writer's strike ===
After two months of being off-air, the first show to air during the 2007–2008 Writers Guild of America strike on January 2, 2008, featured a small musical segment at the beginning of the show detailing O'Brien's newly grown beard in a show of support for the striking writers. At the beginning of the January 28 episode, it was revealed that Conan had shaved his beard, which was followed with a similar musical segment.

Several times during the episodes produced during the writer's strike, O'Brien would kill time by spinning his wedding ring on his desk, which he previously only did during rehearsals. His personal best was 41 seconds, achieved during an un-aired rehearsal. After several unsuccessful on-air attempts to break his record, during the show originally broadcast on February 8, 2008, O'Brien broke his record for endurance ring spinning, setting a time of 51 seconds by coating his wedding ring with Vaseline and spinning it on a Teflon surface. The feat was accomplished with the help of MIT physics professor Peter Fisher. The strike also gave rise to associate producer Jordan Schlansky's repeated appearances on the show as an exaggerated version of himself.

==== "Feud" with Jon Stewart and Stephen Colbert ====
Early on in the later half of the 2007–2008 Writer's Guild strike, Conan O'Brien claimed credit for presidential candidate Mike Huckabee's popularity in opinion polling, due to his use of the Walker, Texas Ranger Lever while Chuck Norris was coincidentally sponsoring Huckabee. Stephen Colbert made the claim that because of "the Colbert bump," he was responsible for Huckabee's current success in the 2008 presidential race. O'Brien then claimed to be responsible for Colbert's success; in response, Jon Stewart, host of The Daily Show, claimed that he was responsible for the success of O'Brien, and in turn the success of both Huckabee and Colbert. This resulted in a three-part comedic battle among the three hosts, with all three appearing on each other's shows. The feud ended on Late Night with an all-out mock brawl between the three talk-show hosts.

=== Anniversary episodes ===
In 1996, a third anniversary episode was taped, though it aired in the regular 12:35/11:35 late night time slot. The show was composed of clips of the best of the first three years, and featured cameos from many former guests, including Janeane Garofalo, Scott Thompson, Tony Randall and George Wendt. Typical of O'Brien's style of comedy, he introduced his first guest (Wendt) by listing his notable achievements in television (particularly Cheers) then introduced each subsequent guest by repeatedly listing Wendt's achievements (insinuating that all of his guests for that night's show played the role of Norm on Cheers). In 1998, Late Night aired a fifth anniversary special in prime time, mostly consisting of clips from the first five years. It was taped in the Saturday Night Live studio, also in the GE Building. The special was later sold on VHS tape. In 2003, a similar tenth anniversary special was taped in New York City's famed Beacon Theatre and later made available on DVD.

=== The final episode ===
Late Night with Conan O'Brien's last episode was recorded February 20, 2009, and aired shortly after midnight that next morning. The episode featured clips from past shows and a reflection on the show's sixteen-year-long run. John Mayer sent a farewell video message, singing a song about how Los Angeles is "going to eat [Conan] alive" (an ironic foretelling of things to come). In a short remote piece, Conan released regular contributor Abe Vigoda "into the wild," as he could not bring him to Los Angeles for the move to The Tonight Show. Will Ferrell made a surprise visit as George W. Bush, which quickly devolved into Ferrell tearing off his business suit to reveal an ill-fitting green leprechaun outfit that had been worn in a number of previous appearances on the show.

Former sidekick Andy Richter, who re-joined O'Brien when he took over The Tonight Show in June, joined O'Brien onstage for two segments, watching clips and reminiscing about the show. Among the clips shown, O'Brien noted that his all-time favorite Late Night piece was when he attended a re-enactment of an American Civil War-era baseball game, played at a Long Island, New York museum, Old Bethpage Village Restoration. During the course of the final week, O'Brien began violently dismantling and handing out pieces of the production set to the audience. In the final show, a large piece of the stage's frame was pulled down and chopped into pieces. O'Brien then promised to give each audience member in attendance a piece of the set.

One of Conan's favorite bands, The White Stripes, performed a new, slower arrangement of their song "We're Going to Be Friends" based on Conan's lullaby rendition of the song, with drummer Meg White playing second guitar and singing along with vocalist/guitarist Jack White. The performance proved to be the band's last before their breakup in February 2011. The song would be used many years later as the theme for O'Brien's podcast Conan O'Brien Needs a Friend. The program concluded with a visibly emotional O'Brien giving a farewell speech from behind his desk, thanking his fans, writers, producers, backstage crew, his family, the Max Weinberg 7, David Letterman, Joel Godard, Jay Leno, and Lorne Michaels, as well as a final assurance that he would not "grow up" as he moved to The Tonight Show.

About 3.4 million viewers watched O'Brien's final episode of Late Night, the largest audience since the January 24, 2005 episode that followed Jay Leno's tribute to Johnny Carson.

After the end of the series, Studio 6A at Rockefeller Center was remodeled for The Dr. Oz Show. In the summer of 2013, NBC moved Late Night with Jimmy Fallon to Studio 6A while 6B, which housed Late Night since Fallon succeeded O'Brien in 2009, was being renovated when Fallon took over The Tonight Show on February 17, 2014, while The Dr. Oz Show moved to ABC's Upper West Side studios.

== Awards and nominations ==
Year	Award	Category	Result
1996	Emmy Award	Outstanding Individual Achievement in Writing for a Variety or Music Program	Nominated
1997	Emmy Award	Outstanding Individual Achievement in Writing for a Variety or Music Program	Nominated
1997	Writers Guild of America Award	Comedy/Variety (Including Talk) – Series	Won
1998	Emmy Award	Outstanding Individual Achievement in Writing for a Variety or Music Program	Nominated
1999	Emmy Award	Outstanding Individual Achievement in Writing for a Variety or Music Program	Nominated
1999	Writers Guild of America Award	Comedy/Variety (Including Talk) – Series	Nominated
2000	Emmy Award	Outstanding Individual Achievement in Writing for a Variety or Music Program	Nominated
2000	Writers Guild of America Award	Comedy/Variety (Including Talk) – Series	Won
2001	Emmy Award	Outstanding Individual Achievement in Writing for a Variety or Music Program	Nominated
2001	Writers Guild of America Award	Comedy/Variety (Including Talk) – Series	Nominated
2002	Emmy Award	Outstanding Individual Achievement in Writing for a Variety or Music Program	Nominated
2002	Writers Guild of America Award	Comedy/Variety (Including Talk) – Series	Won
2003	Emmy Award	Outstanding Individual Achievement in Writing for a Variety or Music Program	Nominated
2003	Emmy Award	Outstanding Variety, Music or Comedy Series	Nominated
2003	Writers Guild of America Award	Comedy/Variety (Including Talk) – Series	Won
2004	Emmy Award	Outstanding Individual Achievement in Writing for a Variety or Music Program	Nominated
2004	Emmy Award	Outstanding Technical Direction, Camerawork, Video for a Series	Nominated
2004	Emmy Award	Outstanding Variety, Music or Comedy Series	Nominated
2004	Writers Guild of America Award	Comedy/Variety (Including Talk) – Series	Nominated
2005	Emmy Award	Outstanding Individual Achievement in Writing for a Variety or Music Program	Nominated
2005	Emmy Award	Outstanding Technical Direction, Camerawork, Video for a Series	Nominated
2005	Emmy Award	Outstanding Variety, Music or Comedy Series	Nominated
2005	People's Choice Award	Favorite Late Night Talk Show Host	Nominated
2005	Telvis Award	Special Telvis	Won
2005	Writers Guild of America Award	Comedy/Variety (Including Talk) – Series	Won
2006	Emmy Award	Outstanding Individual Achievement in Writing for a Variety or Music Program	Nominated
2006	Emmy Award	Outstanding Lighting Direction (Electronic, Multi-Camera) for VMC Programming	Nominated
2006	Emmy Award	Outstanding Multi-Camera Picture Editing for a Series	Nominated
2006	Emmy Award	Outstanding Technical Direction, Camerawork, Video for a Series	Nominated
2006	Emmy Award	Outstanding Variety, Music or Comedy Series	Nominated
2006	PGA Award	Television Producer of the Year Award in Variety Television	Nominated
2006	People's Choice Award	Favorite Late Night Talk Show Host	Nominated
2006	Writers Guild of America Award	Comedy/Variety (Including Talk) – Series	Won
2007	Emmy Award	Outstanding Individual Achievement in Writing for a Variety or Music Program	Won
2007	Emmy Award	Outstanding Lighting Direction (Electronic, Multi-Camera) for VMC Programming	Nominated
2007	Emmy Award	Outstanding Technical Direction, Camerawork, Video for a Series	Nominated
2007	Emmy Award	Outstanding Variety, Music or Comedy Series	Nominated
2007	Writers Guild of America Award	Comedy/Variety (Including Talk) – Series	Nominated
2007	PGA Award	Television Producer of the Year Award in Variety Television	Nominated
2008	Emmy Award	Outstanding Individual Achievement in Writing for a Variety or Music Program	Nominated
2008	Emmy Award	Outstanding Lighting Direction (Electronic, Multi-Camera) for VMC Programming	Nominated
2008	Emmy Award	Outstanding Sound Mixing for a Variety, Music Series or a Special	Nominated
2008	Emmy Award	Outstanding Technical Direction, Camerawork, Video for a Series	Nominated
2009	Emmy Award	Outstanding Individual Achievement in Writing for a Variety or Music Program	Nominated
2009	Writers Guild of America Award	Comedy/Variety (Including Talk) – Series	Nominated

== International broadcasts ==
Country	TV Network(s)	Weekly Schedule (local time)
Israel	Yes stars Comedy	11:15 pm Weeknights
Australia	The Comedy Channel	11:15 pm Weeknights
Canada	'A'	Simulcast with NBC
Finland	Sub	Usually starts at 12:00 am Weeknights, otherwise starts during the following hour
Sweden	TV4 Plus	Usually starts some time between 11:55 pm and 12:10 am Weeknights
The Middle East	Super Comedy	
Latin America	I-Sat	12:30 am Weeknights
Turkey	e2	11:00 pm Tuesday–Friday
Portugal	SIC Radical	
(Republic of Ireland) Ireland	3e	Usually starts at 12:00 am Weeknights, otherwise starts during the following hour

CNBC Europe used to air Late Night with Conan O'Brien on weeknights from 11:45 pm–12:30 am CET, with weekend editions on Saturdays and Sundays at 9:45 pm–10:30 pm CET. However, in March 2007, CNBC Europe decided to show only the weekend editions, and drop the weeknight editions, to make way for more business news programmes in their weeknight schedules.

On the week of August 4, 2008, however, CNBC Europe has discontinued showing the NBC Nightly News, which for many years was shown live from America in a 12:30 am–1:00 am CET slot. Late Night with Conan O'Brien has replaced NBC Nightly News in the 12:30 am–1:00 am slot. The weeknight editions were a 30-minute condensed version of the show. The show followed the weeknight condensed version of The Tonight Show with Jay Leno which aired at 12:00 am CET.

In September 2008, CNBC Europe changed the weeknight schedules to include full uncut editions of Late Night with Conan O'Brien broadcast in the 11:45 am CET/10:45 pm GMT 45-minute time slot. This schedule usually ran from Tuesdays to Fridays. CNBC Europe decided to stop broadcasting Late Night as of January 1, 2009, a mere two months before Conan's last show as host. Instead of following The Tonight Show reruns on weekends, CNBC broadcast two Tonight Show episodes in a row.

== See also ==
- List of Late Night with Conan O'Brien sketches
- List of Late Night with Conan O'Brien characters
- List of Late Night with Conan O'Brien episodes
- Pale Force
- The Tonight Show with Conan O'Brien
- List of late night network TV programs
