= WXJO =

- Douglasville, Georgia; United States
- Broadcast area: Atlanta metro area (west)
- Frequency: 1120 kHz
- Branding: My City 104.5

Programming
- Format: Urban gospel

Ownership
- Owner: Cory Condrey; (Condrey Media LLC)

History
- First air date: 1968
- Former call signs: WCIK (1968–1969); WKOG (1969–1979); WIZY (1979–1984); WQXM (1984–1985); WMKS (1985–1986); WQXM (1986–1989); WYGO (1989–1990); WBNM (1990–2000)

Technical information
- Licensing authority: FCC
- Facility ID: 25386
- Class: D
- Power: 1,000 watts (days only)
- Transmitter coordinates: 33°45′48.4″N 84°44′27.8″W
- Translator: 104.5 W283CT (Douglasville)
- Repeater: 1400 WUXL (Macon)

Links
- Public license information: Public file; LMS
- Webcast: Listen live

WXJO (1120 AM) is a daytime-only radio station licensed to Douglasville, Georgia, United States, and reaching western portions of metro Atlanta, mainly within Douglas County. The station is owned by Cory Condrey, through licensee Condrey Media LLC. WXJO's transmitter is co-located with WDCY, and the station's signal is diplexed on to WDCY's antenna towers.

== History ==
The station went on the air as WCIK in 1968 on 1560 kHz, originally licensed to serve the city of Gordon, Georgia. It moved to 1120 kHz in April 1983. In February 1989, the station changed its broadcast callsign to WYGO. Soon thereafter it changed call signs to WBNM in 1990. In March 2000, the station changed call signs to the current WXJO, previously used on what is now KXBS in Bethalto, Illinois.

In 2008, WXJO's city of license was moved to Douglasville from Gordon. The station had originally been broadcasting a variety of music (mostly oldies), and public-service announcements in what appeared to be an early test period since it had been moved to Douglasville. In early December 2011, the station began simulcasting on WANN-LD 29, using audio-only digital subchannel 32.27. The station then broadcast music in Spanish.

In January 2016, the owners of WXJO filed an application to the Federal Communications Commission (FCC) for special temporary authorization to become silent, which was granted. The reason given was "At this time it is not financially feasible to operate WXJO. An application to assign the license to another party is pending". On March 4, 2016, WXJO was granted an FCC construction permit to increase power to 10,000 watts daytime only and change the antenna from nondirectional to directional by erecting a second tower.

The station flipped to a sports format from SB Nation Radio on April 5, 2017, and then to an urban gospel format on March 5, 2018.
