= Peachtree Sports Network =

Regional sports TV channel in Georgia

- Type: Sports-focused broadcast television network
- Country: United States
- Availability: Atlanta, Albany, Augusta, Columbus, Macon and Savannah, Georgia and Dothan, Alabama
- TV stations: See § Stations
- Owner: Gray Media
- Launch date: October 1, 2023; 2 years ago
- Official website: www.atlantanewsfirst.com/sports/peachtree-sports-network/

Peachtree Sports Network is a broadcast television regional sports network in the U.S. states of Georgia and Alabama, owned by Gray Media. The channel was launched in October 2023.

During the 2023–24 NBA season, Gray Media announced an agreement to exclusively air ten games featuring the Atlanta Hawks. WANF served as the flagship network for these games, but all games also aired on the Peachtree Sports Network. During the 2024–25 NBA season, Gray Media and the Hawks announced a smaller agreement to simulcast five games on WANF and Peachtree Sports Network with FanDuel Sports Network Southeast.

Prior to the 2025 MLB season, Gray Media announced an agreement to air 25 Atlanta Braves games. Gray Media will exclusively produce and air 10 spring training games, while additionally simulcasting 15 regular season games with FanDuel Sports Network Southeast. These games will air on Peachtree Sports Network, along with other Gray Media owned television stations.

As of 2025, Peachtree Sports Network additionally holds the rights to live games from the Gwinnett Stripers of Minor League Baseball, College Park Skyhawks of the NBA G League, Atlanta Dream of the WNBA, the Atlanta Vibe of the Pro Volleyball Federation, the Atlanta Hustle of the Ultimate Frisbee Association, the Atlanta Gladiators and Savannah Ghost Pirates of the ECHL, the Georgia Swarm of the National Lacrosse League and the Augusta University men's and women's basketball team. The network also has an agreement with Score Atlanta to air select local high school and middle school sporting events.

The network occasionally serves as an overflow outlet for WPCH-TV during programming conflicts. In March 2025, a NASCAR O'Reilly Auto Parts Series race was moved from WPCH to Peachtree Sports Network due to a conflict with an Atlanta Braves spring training game.

== Affiliates ==
| City of license / Market | Station | Virtual channel | Primary affiliation (on main channel) |
|---|---|---|---|
| Atlanta | WPCH-TV (WXIA-TV for ATSC 1.0 simulcast) | 17.2 | The CW |
| Albany | WGCW-LD | 36.4 | The CW |
| Augusta | WAGT-CD | 26.2 | NBC |
| Augusta | WGAT-LD | 17.3 | NBC |
| Columbus | WTVM | 9.3 | ABC |
| Macon | WPGA-LD | 50.1 | N/A |
| Savannah | WPHJ-LD | 19.3 | CBS |
| Dothan, Alabama | WTVY | 4.5 | CBS |
