= WPEZ =

- Jeffersonville, Georgia; United States
- Broadcast area: Macon, Georgia
- Frequency: 93.7 MHz (HD Radio)
- Branding: Z 93.7

Programming
- Format: Adult contemporary
- Subchannels: HD2: WMAC simulcast
- Affiliations: Compass Media Networks; Premiere Networks; Westwood One

Ownership
- Owner: Cumulus Media
- Sister stations: WDEN-FM; WLZN; WMAC; WMGB

History
- First air date: 1993; 33 years ago
- Former call signs: WMGB (1993–2001); WEGF (2001)

Technical information
- Licensing authority: FCC
- Facility ID: 52551
- Class: C1
- ERP: 100,000 watts
- HAAT: 207 meters (679 ft)
- Transmitter coordinates: 24°34′17.00″N 81°44′25.00″W

Links
- Public license information: Public file; LMS
- Webcast: Listen live
- Website: www.z937.com

WPEZ (93.7 FM, "Z93.7") is a commercial radio station that is licensed to Jeffersonville, Georgia and serves the Macon, Georgia area. The station is owned by Cumulus Media and broadcasts an adult contemporary music format.

== History ==
The station at 93.7 FM first signed on in 1993 as WMGB, broadcasting a contemporary hit radio (CHR) format known as "B93.7".

On September 10, 2001, WMGB exchanged frequencies with WEGF, an adult contemporary (AC) station at 95.1 FM. This move sent the WMGB call letters and CHR format to 95.1 FM, while 93.7 FM took on the WEGF call sign and the AC format, rebranded "Z93.7". A week later, on September 19, WEGF changed its call sign to WPEZ to match its new moniker.

From 2009 to 2019, Brian Roberts was WPEZ's program director and hosted the Z93.7 More Music Morning Show. Roberts left the station in November 2019 due to budget cuts at Cumulus, and in February 2020 he resurfaced at sister stations KEHK and KSCR in Eugene, Oregon as their program director.

== Programming ==
Syndicated programming on WPEZ includes The Bob and Sheri Show in morning drive, John Tesh Radio Show middays, and Delilah weeknights. Weekends feature Your Weekend with Jim Brickman on Saturday mornings and both editions of Backtrax USA — the 1980s version on Saturday evenings and 1990s on Sunday nights.

WPEZ plays Christmas music from late November through Christmas Day. In 2006, a round-the-clock holiday format began on November 17.
