= WLZN =

Coordinates: 32.774°N 83.637°W

Macon, Georgia; United States
- Broadcast area: Macon and Vicinity
- Frequency: 92.3 MHz
- Branding: Macon 92.3

Programming
- Format: Urban contemporary
- Affiliations: Premiere Networks

Ownership
- Owner: Cumulus Media; (Cumulus Licensing LLC)
- Sister stations: WDEN-FM, WMAC, WMGB, WPEZ

History
- First air date: 1992 (as WMKS)
- Former call signs: WVPI (1991–1992, CP); WMKS (1992–1998); WPPG (9/1998-10/1998); WMKS (1998–2005)
- Call sign meaning: We're BLaZiN (previous branding)

Technical information
- Licensing authority: FCC
- Facility ID: 54672
- Class: A
- ERP: 3,000 watts
- HAAT: 100 meters (330 ft)

Links
- Public license information: Public file; LMS
- Webcast: Listen live
- Website: macon923.com

WLZN (92.3 FM, "Macon 92.3") is a radio station serving the Macon, Georgia area with an urban contemporary format. This station is under ownership of Cumulus Media.

On July 1, 2021, WLZN rebranded as "Macon 92.3".
