= WMGB =

Coordinates: 32.556°N 83.737°W

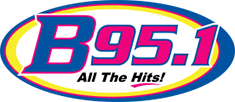
- Montezuma, Georgia; United States
- Broadcast area: Macon–Warner Robins
- Frequency: 95.1 MHz
- Branding: B95.1

Programming
- Format: Top 40 (CHR)
- Affiliations: Westwood One

Ownership
- Owner: Cumulus Media; (Cumulus Licensing LLC)
- Sister stations: WDEN-FM; WLZN; WMAC; WPEZ

History
- First air date: 1999; 27 years ago
- Former call signs: WEGF (1999–2001)
- Call sign meaning: We are Macon, Georgia's B95.1

Technical information
- Licensing authority: FCC
- Facility ID: 88541
- Class: C2
- ERP: 46,000 watts
- HAAT: 119 meters (390 ft)

Links
- Public license information: Public file; LMS
- Webcast: Listen live
- Website: www.allthehitsb951.com

WMGB (95.1 FM, "B95.1") is a radio station licensed to Montezuma, Georgia and serving the Macon, Georgia area with a top 40 (CHR) format. This station broadcasts on FM frequency 95.1 MHz and is under ownership of Cumulus Media.
