= WDEN-FM =

Radio station in Macon, Georgia, United States

Coordinates: 32.764°N 83.559°W

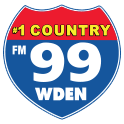
- Macon, Georgia; United States
- Broadcast area: Middle Georgia
- Frequency: 99.1 MHz
- Branding: #1 Country 99 WDEN

Programming
- Format: Country
- Affiliations: Westwood One; Nash FM Network

Ownership
- Owner: Cumulus Media; (Cumulus Licensing LLC)
- Sister stations: WLZN, WMAC, WMGB, WPEZ

History
- First air date: 1947

Technical information
- Licensing authority: FCC
- Facility ID: 46996
- Class: C1
- ERP: 100,000 watts
- HAAT: 177 meters (581 ft)

Links
- Public license information: Public file; LMS
- Webcast: Listen live
- Website: wden.com

WDEN-FM (99.1 MHz, "#1 Country FM 99 WDEN") is a commercial radio station licensed to Macon, Georgia. The station is owned by Cumulus Media and the broadcast license is held by Cumulus Licensing, LLC. WDEN airs a country music radio format. The studios and offices are on Mulberry Street.

WDEN-FM has an effective radiated power (ERP) of 100,000 watts, the maximum permitted for non-grandfathered FM stations. It uses a tower that is 177 meters (581 feet) in height above average terrain (HAAT). The transmitter is off Ocmulgee East Boulevard (Route 87), near Interstate 16 in Macon.

== Programming ==
WDEN-FM's parent company, Cumulus Media, has renamed most of the country music stations in its chain "Nash FM." But over the years, WDEN-FM developed its own identity so it continues to be called "#1 Country FM 99 WDEN." Two nationally syndicated Cumulus and Westwood One shows are carried weekday evenings on WDEN-FM: "Nights With Elaina" and "Picklejar Up All Night With Patrick Thomas." Two local weekday shows are heard on WDEN-FM: "The Early Morning Crew" wake-up show, hosted by Laura Starling and James Bierley. The Early Morning Crew formerly featured program director Gerry Marshall, who retired in 2004. In afternoons, Big Bobby Reed is heard. Reed also serves as program director.

WDEN-FM is an active participant in the community as well as supporting charitable causes. Each year, it holds a local radiothon for the St. Jude Children's Research Hospital in Memphis.

== History ==
=== WMAZ-FM and WAYS ===
The WDEN-FM license traces its history back to 1947, when WMAZ-FM signed on at 99.1 as Macon's first FM station. It was owned by the Southeastern Broadcasting Company, which also owned AM 940 WMAZ (now WMAC). WMAZ-FM mostly simulcast its AM sister station for its first couple of decades; in 1953, the Southeastern Broadcasting Company added Macon's first VHF TV station, channel 13 WMAZ-TV.

In the 1950s, as network programming moved from radio to TV, WMAZ-AM-FM switched to a full service middle of the road format of popular adult music, news and sports. In the late 1950s, WMAZ-AM-FM-TV produced middle Georgia's first radio-television simulcast for the 24th Annual Bibb County Spelling Bee.

Southeastern sold WMAZ-AM-FM-TV to Southern Broadcasting Corporation in 1963, which merged with the News-Piedmont Company to form Multimedia, Inc. in 1967. Also in the late 1960s, WMAZ-FM broke its simulcast with AM 940; it began running an automated Top 40 format. In 1974, WMAZ-AM-FM-TV moved to a new studio facility on Gray Highway in Macon. To establish a separate identity, WMAZ-FM changed its call letters to WAYS in 1984, maintaining its Top 40 sound. By the middle of 1987, the station went CHR.

Multimedia merged with Gannett in 1995. Gannett had by this time decided to pull out of radio, concentrating on its TV stations and newspapers. It sold off WMAZ and WAYS in 1996 to Ocmulgee Broadcasting Company for $1.5 million. The next year, U.S. Broadcasting Limited Partnership, the owner of WDEN-AM-FM, bought WMWR (the renamed WMAZ) and WAYS from Ocmulgee in a $4.7 million transaction; by this time, WAYS was an oldies station.

In the early 1990s, WAYS flipped to oldies.

=== Moving WDEN-FM to 99.1 ===
In 2000, as part of an agreement to create a new move-in radio station in Atlanta, U.S. Broadcasting applied to downgrade WDEN-FM 105.3 from 100,000 watts to 6,100 and relocate it to 105.5 MHz. In order to preserve the country format's regional coverage, it was decided to move WDEN-FM to the 99.1 facility. For the month of December 2000, WDEN-FM was simulcast on 105.3 and 99.1, with messages asking listeners to tune to 99.1 for WDEN-FM's country format. The day after Christmas, WDEN-FM moved exclusively to 99.1; WAYS and its oldies format changed positions to the newly moved 105.5 MHz.

Cumulus Media acquired all four stations in 2002. WDEN-FM continues as Macon's top-rated country music station for more than half a century.
