= WMGT-TV =

Television station in Macon, Georgia, United States

- Macon–Warner Robins, Georgia; United States
- City: Macon, Georgia
- Channels: Digital: 30 (UHF); Virtual: 41
- Branding: 41 NBC, Bounce TV Macon (41.2)

Programming
- Affiliations: 41.1: NBC; 41.2: Bounce TV and MNTV; for others, see § Subchannels

Ownership
- Owner: Morris Multimedia; (Morris Network Inc.)

History
- First air date: December 19, 1968
- Former call signs: WCWB-TV (1968–1983); WMGT (1983–2003)
- Former channel numbers: Analog: 41 (UHF, 1968–2009); Digital: 40 (UHF, 2002–2019)
- Call sign meaning: Macon (or Middle) Georgia Television

Technical information
- Licensing authority: FCC
- Facility ID: 43847
- ERP: 90.1 kW
- HAAT: 189 m (620 ft)
- Transmitter coordinates: 32°45′13″N 83°33′46″W

Links
- Public license information: Public file; LMS
- Website: 41nbc.com

WMGT-TV (channel 41) is a television station in Macon, Georgia, United States, affiliated with NBC. It is the flagship television property of Savannah-based Morris Multimedia. WMGT-TV's studios are located on Poplar Street in downtown Macon, and its transmitter is located on GA 87/US 23/US 129 ALT (Golden Isles Highway) along the Bibb–Twiggs county line.

== History ==
The station first signed on the air on December 19, 1968, as WCWB-TV. It was the first commercial television station to start up in the Macon market since CBS affiliate WMAZ-TV (channel 13) debuted on September 27, 1953, fifteen years and three days earlier. The station was founded by Dothan, Alabama, broadcaster and perennial Alabama political candidate Charles Woods, who owned the station for about six years. WCWB's original studio facilities were located at its transmitter site, about 15 miles (24 km) east of Macon, on what local residents refer to as the "Cochran Short Route".

Channel 41 has been an NBC affiliate since its debut. however, unlike many stations in (then) two-station markets, WCWB did not assume a secondary affiliation with ABC. Instead, WMAZ aired select ABC shows during time periods when the station was not carrying CBS programming; Macon would not receive a full-time ABC affiliate of its own until WGXA (channel 24) signed on in April 1982.

In 1974, Woods sold channel 41 to station president F. E. Busby, who headed a local investor group known as Bibb Television, Inc. Busby proved no more successful at making WCWB profitable than Woods had been, and current owner Morris Multimedia bought the station from Bibb four years later, in 1978.

Channel 41's early years of struggle were caused in large part because the Federal Communications Commission (FCC) had implemented the All-Channel Receiver Act only four years before the station signed on the air. Macon is a fairly large market geographically, and UHF stations are usually not received well across wide areas, even though much of Middle Georgia's terrain is fairly level. Many area households probably did not upgrade their sets to newer UHF-compatible models (or purchase expensive converters) until well into the early 1970s, meaning that, in WCWB's first years of operation, some viewers could not watch the station even had they wanted to, a situation greatly handicapping the young station's promotional efforts. Many (if not most) viewers in Middle Georgia did not get a clear picture from the station until cable arrived in the area in the late 1970s. Even so, most Middle Georgia viewers instinctively turned to WMAZ out of long-standing habits for years, ignoring WCWB even after UHF compatibility became universal on sets (the only other UHF station available then was WDCO-TV (now WMUM-TV), a satellite of Georgia Public Television).

Further complicating matters, WCWB had to compete with longer-established NBC affiliates in the VHF band that were easily viewable on the outer portions of the market. WSB-TV in Atlanta put out at least a grade B signal into much of the northern portion of the market, while WALB-TV in Albany and WSAV-TV in Savannah could be picked up in the respective portions of the southwestern and southeastern portions of WCWB's viewing area.

The station changed its call letters to WMGT (for "Middle Georgia Television") on December 1, 1983, to reflect the area of Georgia that it serves (the old WCWB call letters would later be used by channel 22 in Pittsburgh from 1998 to 2006 during its affiliation with The WB; that station is now WPNT). In 2000, the station moved its operations from unincorporated Bibb County into a renovated two-story warehouse in Downtown Macon, which promised to aid the revitalization of the historic area and signify future growth for the station. Morris maintains its corporate headquarters on the second floor of WMGT's studio facility. The station's legal call sign was modified in 2003 to include a "-TV" suffix to disambiguate itself from a Minnesota radio station that also held the WMGT calls. On April 3, 2006, WMGT retired its "41" logo (which resembled the 1993 to 2001 logo used by fellow NBC affiliate and former sister station KARK-TV in Little Rock) and "41 NBC" branding, introducing a new logo and rebranding as "Today's MGT"; the "41 NBC" brand was restored on March 23, 2009, with the introduction of a new logo.

=== 1988 World Series intrusion ===
An unknown technician from WMGT was fired after the station was hijacked during a live broadcast of Game 1 of the 1988 World Series between the Oakland Athletics and the Los Angeles Dodgers that aired on October 15, 1988, replacing 30 seconds of the second inning with a scene from a black and white pornographic film, while audio from the game played. Many viewer complaints came in from the Macon Telegraph and News after the station could not get through with the calls. A couple days afterwards, station manager L. A. Sturdivant told Macon Telegraph and News that the matter was under investigation, and stated that the situation had been accidental and not deliberately planned.

== WMGT-DT2 ==
WMGT-DT2, branded Bounce TV Macon, is the primary Bounce TV and secondary MyNetworkTV-affiliated second digital subchannel of WMGT-TV, broadcasting in standard definition on channel 41.2.

The subchannel first signed on the air on July 6, 2009. Prior to its launch, MyNetworkTV programming was previously carried as a secondary affiliation on Fox affiliate WGXA beginning with the service's launch on September 5, 2006. In the summer of 2011, WMGT-DT2 was rebranded as "My41.2".

As contracts for syndicated programming expired, the Bounce TV programming formerly seen on channel 41.3 was merged onto the schedule of WMGT-DT2 in March 2020, replacing the syndicated programming on the subchannel outside of the MyNetworkTV lineup; additionally, MyNetworkTV programming was moved to 2 to 4 a.m. on Tuesday through Saturday mornings in favor of Bounce TV's prime time offerings, an increasingly common fate for the service on a number of its affiliates.

== News operation ==
WMGT-TV presently broadcasts 20 hours of locally produced newscasts each week (with four hours each weekday and one hour on Sundays). Unlike most NBC affiliates, the station does not produce any live newscasts on Saturdays.

The station began producing newscasts at its 1968 inception. However, due to the problems mentioned above caused by WMAZ's dominance of the market, WCWB's newscasts struggled in the ratings for years, and were mostly discontinued by the early 1970s. It made a modest attempt at newscasts again later in the decade. However, within a few months following its start in 1982, WGXA's newscasts surged to second place in the market (behind WMAZ), because its news product was perceived as being far more modern than that of the newscasts seen on WCWB. Once again, due to low viewership, channel 41 shut down its news department in 1992. For the next 12 years, it was one of the few Big Three affiliates that did not air any newscasts at all.

The station relaunched its news operation on September 6, 2004, as Tropical Storm Frances moved through the Southeastern United States. At that time, WMGT began producing three half-hour newscasts that aired at 6:30 a.m., 5:30 and 11 p.m. When the news department was re-established, WMGT was among the first stations in the country to maintain a completely digital newsgathering operation.

With cable now having leveled the playing field somewhat by rendering the UHF reception issue largely moot, WMGT gradually expanded its newscasts over the next few years. The station eventually expanded its weekday morning newscast to two hours, running from 5 to 7 a.m., in October 2012. The early evening newscast was later moved to 6 p.m. On July 6, 2009, the station began producing a half-hour prime time newscast each weeknight at 10 p.m. for WMGT-DT2, and also began airing a rebroadcast of its 6 p.m. newscast at 7 p.m. In October 2012, the station expanded its 11 p.m. newscast to Sunday evenings. Around this time, the station began airing a rebroadcast of its morning newscast on WMGT-DT2 from 7 to 9 a.m. On September 16, 2013, the station debuted a half-hour midday newscast at 11 a.m. called 41 Today, a non-traditional news program that places a heavy emphasis on community events, consumer and lifestyle features and weather forecasts. On February 18, 2014, WMGT became the third station in the Macon market (after WRWR-LD (channel 38) and WMAZ-TV) to begin broadcasting its local newscasts in high definition; however, the newscasts on WMGT-DT2 were not included in the upgrade, instead broadcasting them in widescreen enhanced definition in the subchannel's native 480i resolution format.

=== Notable current on-air staff ===
- Bill Shanks – Host of The End Zone

== Technical information ==
=== Subchannels ===
The station's signal is multiplexed:

Subchannels of WMGT-TV
Subchannel	Res.	Short name	Programming
41.1	1080i	NBC	NBC
41.2	480i	MyBounc	Bounce TV (primary); MyNetworkTV (secondary) (4:3)
41.3	480i	DEFY	Ion Plus (4:3)
41.4	480i	CourtTV	Ion Mystery (4:3)
41.5	480i	LAFF	Laff (4:3)
41.6	480i	Dabl	Dabl

WMGT has been digital-only since February 17, 2009.
