= WLXF =

K-Love radio station in Macon, Georgia, United States

Coordinates: 32.897°N 83.535°W

- Macon, Georgia; United States
- Broadcast area: Central Georgia
- Frequency: 105.5 MHz (HD Radio)

Programming
- Format: Contemporary Christian
- Network: K-Love

Ownership
- Owner: Educational Media Foundation

History
- First air date: June 10, 1968
- Former call signs: WDEN-FM (1968–2000); WAYS (2000–05); WIFN (2005–09); WROK-FM (2009–16)
- Former frequencies: 105.3 MHz (1968–2000)

Technical information
- Licensing authority: FCC
- Facility ID: 68679
- Class: C3
- ERP: 6,100 watts
- HAAT: 201 m (659 ft)

Links
- Public license information: Public file; LMS
- Webcast: Listen Live
- Website: www.klove.com

WLXF (105.5 FM) is a Christian radio station licensed to serve Macon, Georgia. It broadcasts a Contemporary Christian music format.

== History ==
=== WDEN-FM ===
The current 105.5 license began broadcasting at 105.3 MHz as WDEN-FM, Macon's second FM radio station, on June 10, 1968. It was the FM sister station to WDEN (1500 AM), a daytime-only country music outlet, and its full-time simulcast, additionally operating after local sunset. The original owners of WDEN-AM-FM were the Rowland family, doing business as Radio Macon; the Rowlands WQIK-AM-FM in Jacksonville and WQYK-AM-FM in St. Petersburg J. Marvin Elliott acquired an 81 percent ownership interest from the Rowlands in 1972 for $325,000.

Elliott died in 1978. Two years later, his estate sold the WDEN stations to a limited partnership known as First Macon Communications Corporation, a group of Alabama investors, for $1,026,500. Eventually, the two signals were split, with WDEN-FM concentrating on current country hits with less talk, and WDEN AM specializing in more personality and a playlist including classic country. In 1982, the AM station adopted a separate set of call letters, WPTC; it returned to WDEN in 1986.

WDEN-AM-FM was sold to Magic Broadcasting, later known as U.S. Broadcasting Limited Partnership, for $6 million in 1987.

=== Downgrade, frequency change and format changes ===
Prior to 2000, WDEN-FM operated with 100,000 watts at 105.3 MHz. However, the station filed for a major downgrade to 6,100 watts at 105.5 MHz. The move was arranged so that a 105.5 station southwest of Atlanta, Class A WYAI-FM in Bowdon, could upgrade and move to 105.3 to serve Atlanta. On December 26, 2000, the 105.3 facility changed to the lower-power 105.5; the WDEN-FM call letters and country music format moved to 100,000-watt 99.1 MHz, which Magic had acquired in 1997 and which simulcast WDEN-FM for the entire month of December; and oldies station WAYS moved from 99.1 to 105.5.

Cumulus Media acquired the seven-station U.S. Broadcasting cluster in Macon for $35.5 million.

In 2005, WAYS moved again, this time to 1500 AM, and 105.5 FM flipped to sports talk as WIFN "ESPN 105.5 The Fan".

On September 3, 2009, WIFN began stunting with TV theme songs, with liners promoting to tune in at 1:05 PM the next day for a big announcement. At that time, WIFN moved to 1500 AM, and 105.5 flipped to mainstream rock as WROK-FM "Rock 105.5". The first song on Rock 105.5 was Know Your Enemy by Green Day.

=== Sale to EMF ===
In 2011, Cumulus bought Citadel Broadcasting. As a result of coming into compliance with current FCC ownership rules, Cumulus was required to place several stations, including WLXF, in a divestiture trust.

On March 4, 2016, the Educational Media Foundation acquired WROK from Cumulus’ Joule Broadcasting divestment trust for $625,000. EMF would flip WROK-FM to its K-Love network upon closing of the deal. The sale closed and the switch to the K-Love format took place on May 25, 2016. On May 31, 2016, WROK-FM changed its call letters to WLXF.

== Programming ==
Until May 25, 2016, along with the previous rock format, WROK-FM remained Macon's FM home for Atlanta Braves baseball and Georgia Bulldogs football.

In October 2009, the station picked up The Regular Guys (simulcasted from sister-owned WNNX-FM in nearby Atlanta) for its morning drive slot.

The station is now a K-Love affiliate that broadcasts Contemporary Christian music.
