= WNEX-FM =

- Perry, Georgia; United States
- Broadcast area: Macon and Vicinity
- Frequency: 100.9 MHz
- Branding: The Creek 100.9FM

Programming
- Format: Americana

Ownership
- Owner: Visit Macon; (Creek Media, LLC)
- Sister stations: WDDO

History
- First air date: 1966
- Former call signs: WPGA-FM (1966–2015)

Technical information
- Licensing authority: FCC
- Facility ID: 54726
- Class: A
- ERP: 3,300 watts
- HAAT: 136 meters
- Transmitter coordinates: 32.556°N 83.737°W
- Translator: 102.9 W275CC (Macon)

Links
- Public license information: Public file; LMS
- Website: www.thecreekfm.com

WNEX-FM is an FM radio station serving the middle Georgia area with an Americana format. Licensed to Perry, Georgia, United States, the station serves the Macon metropolitan area, broadcasting on 100.9 MHz and is owned by Creek Media.
