= WMAC =

- Macon, Georgia; United States
- Broadcast area: Central Georgia
- Frequency: 940 kHz
- Branding: News Talk 940 WMAC

Programming
- Format: News/talk
- Affiliations: Fox News Radio; Premiere Networks; Westwood One; WMAZ-TV (Local news and weather updates)

Ownership
- Owner: Cumulus Media; (Cumulus Licensing LLC)
- Sister stations: WDEN-FM; WLZN; WMGB; WPEZ

History
- First air date: October 30, 1922; 103 years ago (experimental 1910–1922)
- Former call signs: WMAZ (1922–1996); WMWR (1996–1998)
- Call sign meaning: "Macon" (also disambiguation of original call sign)

Technical information
- Licensing authority: FCC
- Facility ID: 46998
- Class: B
- Power: 50,000 watts day; 10,000 watts night
- Transmitter coordinates: 32°53′06″N 83°43′50″W
- Repeater: 93.7 WPEZ-HD2 (Jeffersonville)

Links
- Public license information: Public file; LMS
- Webcast: Listen live
- Website: www.wmac-am.com

WMAC (940 AM, "News Talk 940") is a commercial Class B radio station in Macon, Georgia. It is owned by Cumulus Media and airs a news/talk format. The studios and offices are on Mulberry Street in Macon. It is one of the oldest radio stations in Georgia. WMAC is a primary entry point for the Emergency Alert System (EAS).

WMAC is a Class B radio station, operating from a five-tower transmitter facility on Forsyth Road (U.S. Route 41) in Macon. By day, a single tower radiates a 50,000-watt non-directional signal from Albany to the suburbs of Atlanta. But because it broadcasts on AM 940, a clear channel frequency reserved for XEQ in Mexico City, WMAC reduces its power at night to 10,000 watts with power fed to all five towers, concentrating the signal in Central Georgia.

== Programming ==
Much of WMAC's schedule is made up of nationally syndicated conservative talk radio shows, most of them from the co-owned Westwood One Network. Weekdays begin with two information shows, America in the Morning and First Light, followed by Chris Plante, Mark Levin, Michael Savage, and Red Eye Radio. From Premiere Networks, WMAC carries Sean Hannity in late evenings. On weekends, WMAC carries tech expert Kim Komando and consumer advocate Clark Howard. Some weekend hours are paid brokered programming. Most hours begin with world and national news from Fox News Radio. Local news and weather updates are provided by Channel 13 WMAZ-TV.

== History ==
=== Early years ===
This station started out as part of a radio experiment by Mercer University professor C.R. Fountain's physics class in 1910. On October 30, 1922, Mercer obtained a commercial license under the call sign WMAZ. The university soon found itself in over its head operating a radio station. In 1927, it sold WMAZ to the Macon Junior Chamber of Commerce, forerunner of the Macon Jaycees.

A group of Macon businessmen formed the Southeastern Broadcasting Company and leased the station in 1929, before buying it outright in 1935. In the 1930s, WMAZ was a daytimer, broadcast on 1180 kilocycles, first at 500 watts, and later at 1,000 watts, but required to sign off at sunset to protect WCAU in Philadelphia. In 1937, WMAZ became a CBS Radio network affiliate, carrying its schedule of dramas, comedies, news, sports, soap operas, game shows, and big band broadcasts during the "Golden Age of Radio". It broadcast the Soap Box Derby live. By the late 1930s, WMAZ was permitted to remain on the air after sundown, but at reduced power to protect WCAU.

In 1941, with the enactment of the North American Regional Broadcasting Agreement (NARBA), WMAZ moved to its current 940 kHz, a better spot on the dial. The power was boosted to 5,000 watts around the clock, and by 1950, it increased to 10,000 watts.

=== FM and TV stations ===
In 1947, Macon's first FM station signed on, 99.1 WMAZ-FM (now WDEN-FM). WMAZ-FM mostly simulcast its AM sister station for its first couple of decades. In 1953, the Southeastern Broadcasting Company added Macon's first VHF TV station, Channel 13 WMAZ-TV. Because 940 WMAZ was a CBS affiliate, WMAZ-TV also ran CBS TV shows, with a secondary affiliation with ABC and the DuMont Television Network.

In the 1950s, as network programming moved from radio to TV, WMAZ-AM-FM switched to a full service middle of the road format of popular adult music, news, and sports. In the late 1950s, WMAZ-AM-FM-TV produced middle Georgia's first radio-television simulcast for the 24th Annual Bibb County Spelling Bee. In 1958, 940 WMAZ's daytime power was boosted to 50,000 watts. That made it the second-most powerful station in Georgia, after WSB 750 in Atlanta, powered at 50,000 watts around the clock. In the 1960 edition of Broadcasting Yearbook, an advertisement said 50,000 watt WMAZ is "the only station to cover completely the rich, 31-county Middle Georgia market".

=== Ownership changes ===
Southeastern sold WMAZ-AM-FM-TV to Southern Broadcasting Corporation in 1963, which merged with the News-Piedmont Company to form Multimedia, Inc. in 1967. In 1974, WMAZ-AM-FM-TV moved to a new studio facility on Gray Highway in Macon. Throughout the 1980s, the station had an adult contemporary format until 1989, when it switched back to its former MOR format.

Multimedia merged with Gannett in 1995. Gannett had by this time decided to pull out of radio, concentrating on its TV stations and newspapers. It sold off the radio stations in 1996. The new owners changed AM 940's call sign to WMWR on August 23, (standing for Macon-Warner Robins), but a year later, the station was sold as part of a group purchase by U.S. Broadcasting. On July 1, 1998, the station changed to its current call sign, WMAC. The call sign not only stands for Macon, but are a nod to the heritage call letters the station used for 3-quarters of a century.

In 2002, U.S. Broadcasting sold this station as part of a group purchase by Cumulus Media. In 2015, WMAC switched to Westwood One News from ABC News Radio due to a corporate change by Cumulus Media. In August 2020, Westwood One News shut down; so WMAC aligned with Fox News Radio for national news. As the news department was scaled back due to budget cuts, news, and weather updates began to be supplied by former sister station WMAZ-TV Channel 13.
