= WDDO =

- Perry, Georgia; United States
- Broadcast area: Macon metropolitan area
- Frequency: 980 kHz
- Branding: The Light AM980

Programming
- Language: English
- Format: Urban contemporary gospel

Ownership
- Owner: The Glory Media Group, LLC

History
- First air date: 1956
- Former call signs: WPGA (1956–2016)

Technical information
- Licensing authority: FCC
- Facility ID: 54727
- Class: D
- Power: 2,600 watts (day); 80 watts (night)
- Transmitter coordinates: 32°33′20.5″N 83°44′13.7″W
- Translator: (107.9 MHz) W300EB (Macon)

Links
- Public license information: Public file; LMS
- Website: www.facebook.com/TheGlory107.9FM/

WDDO (980 kHz) is an AM Christian radio station broadcasting an urban contemporary gospel format, with programming provided mostly from the Sheridan Gospel Network. Licensed to Perry, Georgia, the station is owned by The Glory Media Group, LLC.
