= List of Late Night with Conan O'Brien sketches =

The following is a list of sketches performed on Late Night with Conan O'Brien on NBC.

== Late Night sketches ==
=== Actual Items ===
A parody of Jay Leno's Headlines segment on The Tonight Show in which Leno finds humorous mistakes in various newspapers. Conan's bit takes regular newspaper ads and stories and adds blatantly fake text; for example, an ad depicting a leather living room couch was modified to include a cartoon cow exclaiming, "How's my ass feel, you son of a bitch?", or an ad for a new home, labeling one of the rooms as "The Room You Will Die In." Adding to the humor, Conan repeatedly insists that his ads are real, commenting "you can't make this stuff up, why would you, that would waste everybody's time." This sketch appeared on the show's very first episode in September 1993.

=== "ASS" Stamp ===
Conan and Max converse about a current event or person, with Conan asking leading questions to which Max replies incorrectly, but in great detail in an attempt to appear knowledgeable. Usually, this is initiated when Conan introduces a person who is famous for some accomplishment but not necessarily widely recognizable. Max will claim to recognize the person and perhaps claim to be a long-time friend or acquaintance of the individual. Conan then catches Max in the lie, stating "I made it up just to make a fool out of you!". Max replies "Well, I guess I know what's coming...", Conan says "You sure do", and a large red stamp (like a typical rubber stamp imprint) of the word "ASS" appears on the screen over a dejected Max, along with a dramatic voiceover of the word. Occasionally, the roles will be reversed, and Conan will be "stamped".

Other stamps are often used to abruptly punctuate various one-off sketches, including words such as "Alone", "Liar", "Sad", and "Small Penis". Another sketch on Tonight ended with an "Admirable" stamp after Barack Obama called the work of AFTRA members "admirable" in a video. Otherwise, these sketches bear no particular resemblance to the standard recurring "Ass Stamp" sketch.

A variation of the ass stamp appeared on Conan's new show on TBS in 2011 during the NFL playoffs where Conan and Andy are trying to feign an interest in the NFL playoffs and afterward, a stamp appears over the two of them calling them "GIRLS". This happened again during the Stanley Cup Playoffs when Conan said he was cheering for the Boston Bruins, since Conan is from Boston. Andy then called him out on it, saying he's never heard about him talk about hockey before. Andy then quizzed him on who the coach was, name a forward, the goalie, etc., and then asked who the Assistant Equipment Manager was, and then ridiculous ones like Vice-President of Corporate Partnerships. Eventually, Conan got one wrong and Conan was stamped as a "PHONY A-HOLE".

=== Before Plastic Surgery ===
A picture of a famous celebrity, usually either rumored to have had or has actually had plastic surgery done in real life, is shown. The picture is then distorted with exaggerated features into a grotesque new picture of what that person looked like before the surgery. The last item in the sketch often makes a joke using an unaltered photograph of another unrelated celebrity, animal, plant or object as the before picture: for example, if George W. Bush had plastic surgery, his before picture would be that of a chimpanzee. The sketch is loosely related to the "If They Mated" sketch in that it uses the same technology for a similar comedic premise.

=== Celebrity Secrets ===
Features celebrities in a room that looks like a jail cell or perhaps a police interrogation room, smoking a cigarette and downing hard liquor, usually telling some humorous "secret" previously unknown about them. For example, one featured Michael Caine saying "I was convinced that the 'MC' in MC Hammer's name stood for Michael Caine. When I found out it didn't, I destroyed his career." Another featured Alex Trebek taking a drink, and admitting he had a "potent potables" problem. When Gwyneth Paltrow appeared on the sketch she admitted that anytime before she starts a new film she kills a hobo with a hammer, as well as admitting an affinity for porn. When U2 appeared on the sketch, they admitted they were not Irish. When Senator John McCain ran for president in 2008, Conan began replaying his secrets segments, which included McCain plugging "The McCain–Feingold Singles Guide to Portland."

=== Coked up Werewolf ===
Shown in 2003 numerous times. The sketch was simply a man in a werewolf costume, rubbing his snout in a manner stereotypically associated with cocaine users.

=== Conan O'Brien Hates My Homeland ===
The premise of this skit had its origin when Late Night received many angry letters from viewers in Ukraine after mocking that nation in another recurring skit, New Euros, where the joke was an image on a Ukrainian Euro Coin depicting a man in Eastern European dress with four arms, holding up seventeen fingers, with the caption on the coin saying "Over 17 years since the Chernobyl Accident". O'Brien was unaware that his show was even airing in Ukraine - thus, the premise of "Conan O'Brien Hates My Homeland" is that O'Brien, in an effort to find out where else the show is being aired without his knowledge, reads fast-paced insults of each of the nations of the world in alphabetical order, with the expectation that angry mail will come pouring in from offended viewers in countries where the show is broadcast. O'Brien insults 5 countries (with a bell ringing between each one) each time the bit airs. A sample insult: Georgia: Where Europe meets Asia and says "Hey, why don't we both dump our crap here?" Announcer Joel Godard then tells insulted viewers around the world a real address to send their angry letters. On August 9, 2007, Zimbabwe was the last country to be featured, thus ending the sketch after three years.

=== Finland ===
An announcer on the Finnish entertainment channel SubTV, which airs the show a couple of days after it is aired in the USA, asked people to defend Finland before O'Brien got to insult it, and the viewers in Finland began sending mail before the bit had even gotten to the letter F. O'Brien responded by assuming the Finnish "just couldn't wait" to be insulted and officially insulted Finland in the segment. An overwhelming number of postcards were supposedly received, which apparently "forced" O'Brien to give Finland a formal apology. O'Brien then went as far as to have the flag of Finland shown in the background during a speech and slandered the Finns' "hated" neighbor Sweden with a sign saying "Sweden Sucks!" printed over the flag of Sweden. In 2006, the Finland antics increased. While talking to fans before the show, O'Brien met two Finnish fans who commented that he strongly resembled Tarja Halonen, who served as the 11th president of Finland between 2000 and 2012. Amused that his show was even airing in Finland, O'Brien made frequent references to his resemblance to Halonen, even putting her picture beside a live feed of his head. Upon learning that Halonen was running for reelection, O'Brien filmed a segment of the show which took the form of a campaign commercial for the President. When Halonen won, she offered to meet him if he ever came to Finland, which O'Brien did in a later episode.

=== Desk Drive ===
Conan and Andy "drive" the host desk through increasingly bizarre situations and locations.

Both Desk Drive and Syncro-Vox were later used by the German late night show Die Harald Schmidt Show.

=== Fantastic Guy ===
This sketch sometimes occurs when Conan announces future guests. After announcing the first guest, a member of the audience (played by writer Brian Stack) is seen saying that the guest is "Fantastic!" right to the camera with a thumbs up. After Conan announces the next guest, the member does almost the same thing, but ends by making up a word by combining a guest's name or work with the word "fantastic". (For example: "Wow, Omar Epps? That charismatic scene-stealer is Epps-tastic!" or "Tell that group, "don't stop the 'tastic!") Then, Conan reminds viewers he will also be doing his usual "hilarious monologue", the camera shows that the man prepares to do his bit, but changes his mind. Conan also mentions the show's "zany, off-the-wall comedy bits", and the man either already stopped paying attention and/or begun torturing himself. (Examples: reading a disturbing or uninteresting book or newspaper article, drinking bleach or drilling his teeth.) Conan then questions the man, asking if he just likes the guests but "thinks everything else we do is crap?" or some other negative word. The man will then finish with "not crap, craptastic!"

=== Guests We'll Never Have Back ===
Conan will start by talking about how great the guests for that night's show are, then mention that sometimes they book guests whose appearances end up being disastrous. He then introduces a series of fictional clips from past shows where the guests reveal themselves to have unforeseen quirks or cause disturbing mishaps. Some examples include a chef who does not actually make anything, but only reassembles food to its original form, and a character named Barney Brittlebones who crumples to the floor the instant he makes physical contact with Conan.

=== Horny Manatee ===
During the airing of the usual "New College Mascots" sketch, a character called the "FSU Webcam Manatee" was featured - a manatee in front of a computer, dancing to the Divinyls' "I Touch Myself", being watched remotely by trumpeter Mark Pender. Conan, in an ad-libbed statement, mentioned that the character appeared on the (at the time) fictitious web site "HornyManatee.com". The next night, Conan told viewers that if he mentions a web site which does not exist, NBC corporate policy is to buy the domain name lest someone else use it and potentially make NBC liable for the site's content. Conan said Late Night decided to use the domain name to create an actual web site, giving it the appearance of a fake porn site. With http://www.hornymanatee.com/ (no longer operational), Conan asked viewers to submit pictures to the page. Since that night, Conan has periodically given viewers an "update" on the website's status, mentioning its hit count and several fan submitted images, poems, and other media pouring in. Conan also used the updates as lead ins for special, on-stage Horny Manatee segments. For example, Conan called on James Lipton to dramatically recite the fan-made poetry, then dance with the Manatee on air at his own request, and flew the Pittsburgh-based pop-punk duo Rocket Me Nowhere to New York to perform their tribute song "My Hopeless Manatee".

The last time Conan stated site's hit count (January 18, 2007), it was "20 million hits" and counting. In an interview with New York Times, O'Brien has also said that he was overwhelmed at the viewer response. As of December 16, 2006, the site has achieved an Alexa website ranking of about 31,000,000, over thirty times the rank for SaveTheManatee.org (about 937,000), to which Late Night is donating some proceeds of its "Horny Manatee" T-shirts offered on the site. Currently, traffic to the website is routed to NBC's main site.

=== If They Mated ===
Pictures of two famous celebrities, usually believed to be dating at the time, are shown. The pictures are then combined into a grotesque new picture of what their offspring would look like if they mated. The segment became so successful that it later spawned a book. The last item in the sketch often makes a joke using an unaltered photograph of a celebrity as the offspring: for example, if Saddam Hussein and Osama bin Laden ("two of the most hated people in the world") were to have a child, it would be Steve Bartman. Another notable example; Paris Hilton and her pet chihuahua would create George W. Bush. Once Conan mated Kelly Ripa with Clay Aiken then asked the question "What do you get when you cross a perky talk show host and a guy who just won't come out of the closet?", and a picture of Conan was shown.

The sketch was revived on O'Brien's TBS show, Conan as "If They Melded" using video of two famous celebrities, though they usually are not dating each other.

=== Joe's ===
Conan begins by talking about needing to relax and unwind by going to his favorite bar - Joe's. Theme music plays with an exterior shot of the bar. He walks inside and the bartender (Kevin Dorff) and a patron (Brian McCann) begin to berate Conan invariably for showing up to an event 'completely plastered' insisting on feminine activities and in some way or another ruining food or drink that's to be served. Conan drinks hard liquor while being yelled at and looking insecure. The sketch always ends with the bartender, Joe, demanding Conan pay the money he owes. Conan stands up, screams, "I'LL PAY WHEN I'M GOOD AND READY!", and hurls his drink against the wall, often returning to break a stool over the bartender and patron

=== Kids’ Drawings ===
Conan tells the audience about a recent visit to the studio by a local grade school class of young children who were so impressed with their visit that they sent in crayon drawings of their favorite experiences. Conan looks at these drawings for the first time with the audience.

=== Masturbating Bear ===
The Masturbating Bear was a recurring character on Late Night. The character consisted of a man in a bear costume dressed in a diaper-like undergarment which contained oversized genitalia, and was often accompanied by several human "handlers" armed with cattle prods. The character would be asked to perform some sort of innocuous task such as explaining a chart on recent economic fluctuations or smoking weed with Conan O'Brien. Inevitably, a few seconds into whatever task he had come to perform, the bear would begin furiously fondling himself as part of the song "Sabre Dance" plays. The bear would then usually be given electric shocks by his human handlers. Despite repeated instances of masturbation, the Masturbating Bear would continue to be invited back on Late Night. Once, the bear was revealed to be Jim Carrey in costume.

In the lead-up to his departure for The Tonight Show in early 2009, O'Brien brought back characters which would be inappropriate in the 11:30 PM time slot, such as the Masturbating Bear, which was frozen in carbonite, but subsequently rescued by Carrie Fisher. The New York Daily News reported on May 27, 2009 that O'Brien eventually plans to reintroduce the Masturbating Bear on Tonight. The bear was last seen sailing away on a boat with Fisher until he reappeared on The Tonight Show on January 20, 2010 in the wake of the controversy surrounding Jay Leno and Conan O'Brien, which saw O'Brien's departure. Originally, it was thought NBC would be able to claim the Masturbating Bear as intellectual property. As a result, he was transformed into the Self-Pleasuring Panda for O'Brien's tour.

When O'Brien took his TBS show to New York City for a week in 2011, the bear was, in one episode, depicted as being out of show business and settling down with a wife and two children in the New York suburbs. After a brief video reel revealed such, the bear was invited on stage to a cheering audience. However, Conan's words about the size of the audience became too much for the bear, who stripped out of his business attire and began to pleasure himself both on stage and on hanging rafters above.

After a series of bear attacks in April 2012, the bear came to Conan's TBS show in Los Angeles.

During Conan's June 2012 trip to Chicago, Conan introduced the Masturbating Bear, but instead a man dressed as a Chicago Bears player watching Internet pornography with his pants down was brought onto the stage. The original Masturbating Bear came out soon after.

In a 2017 Reddit AMA, O'Brien claimed that the masturbating bear died in 2015 of autoerotic asphyxiation.

=== New Characters ===
Conan tells the audience that it is time for new additions to be added to Late Night's current characters, such as "The Masturbating Bear" or the FedEx Pope (Brian McCann). New additions are often more ridiculous than ones before, such as the Nudist Who Has No Skeleton or the Screeching Raccoon with a Jet Pack. Some are popular enough to warrant a second appearance, though few are actually made into recurring characters. Generally the new characters are absurdist in nature and carry names which fully describe their appearance or concept, sometimes extending to full multi phrase sentences. For example, one recurring character was "Gorilla Nurse Using an Old Fashioned Abdominal Exerciser While Listening to 'Angel of the Morning' by Juice Newton" a character which consisted simply of a stuffer gorilla in a nurses costume being vibrated by an old abdominal exerciser while the titular music played. A related gag also exists where Conan promises that he will not waste the audience's time with zany, random jokes, only to introduce a completely zany, random character. Notable characters from this bit include Fidel Castro Rabbit DJ, Nation of Twain, Man protected from three-inch bees, Hippie fire hydrant on a bacon skateboard, Cactus Chef Playing "We Didn't Start the Fire" on the Flute and the Oscillating Air Purifier that Looks Like Slash, and R2–Mr. T2. Another version is "New College Mascots", which feature fake mascots which often make fun of a real college or its surrounding area. One such skit featured an "FSU Webcam Manatee" which spawned the "Horny Manatee" sketch of December 2006.

=== Pierre Bernard's Recliner of Rage ===
A bit in which Late Night graphic designer Pierre Bernard, Jr. sits in a recliner, delivering a long, drawn-out rant about one of his niche interests—such as comic books, anime, or sci-fi—in a soft-spoken, disarmingly calm voice. After finishing his grievance, he shifts his recliner to an upright position and points to a second camera as he declares, “Bottom line, America...,” followed by his specific demands on the issue. Conan then thanks Pierre, typically adding, “I'm sure there's one or two other Americans who know exactly what you're talking about.”

Much of the humor of the sketch comes from the dry, emotionless manner in which Bernard delivers his "rage." A complaint about the TV show Stargate SG-1 led to him getting small cameos on the show, whereas a complaint about the Japanese anime franchise Robotech numerous DVD releases in the marketplace prompted a "response" from robotech.com about the complaint and an offer to send Bernard a free complete collection of the DVDs.

In 2007, Bernard and O'Brien starred in a spin-off sketch entitled "Pierre Bernard: Serial Killer." The sketch had been inspired by Bernard's real life refusal to allow the show to tape a remote segment at his home focusing on his sizable action figure collection. Conan insisted that the only explanation for Bernard's reluctance to allow a camera crew into his home was that the graphic designer was, in fact, a serial killer. During the sketch, O'Brien interviewed Bernard in the manner of news magazine shows such as Dateline NBC, asking questions designed to implicate Bernard as a murderer. Initially, Bernard seemed reluctant but as the sketch went on he seemed to get more into the act. At one point, Bernard admitted that he did not describe himself as prolific because "I haven't been killing for very long." After the taped portion of the sketch, Bernard was wheeled on stage on a gurney wearing a muzzle similar to Hannibal Lecter in The Silence of the Lambs.

Pierre Bernard moved with O'Brien on The Tonight Show to continue as a graphic designer and occasional performer, first seen on June 3, 2009.

=== Puppets and Triumph the Insult Comic Dog ===
Late Night made extensive use of puppets since the show's inception. For example, in one sketch, called "Puppet's Last Words Channel", a puppet scientist prepares to take a drink from a cup labeled "acid" and says, "I sure do love my morning cup of coffee." The acid melts the puppet's face. In another segment of the same sketch, a puppet exclaims to another puppet that she was born with both sets of genitalia. One recurring gag features "Vomiting Kermit", showcasing the Muppet retching streams of liquid from its mouth. Perhaps the most notable puppet, both on and off the show, is Triumph the Insult Comic Dog. On June 19, 2009, Triumph crossed over onto The Tonight Show with Conan O'Brien, and would eventually cross over to Conan on TBS.

Conan would later appear on Late Night with Jimmy Fallon to ceremoniously retrieve Triumph, which had somehow been hiding behind one of the couches on the set. Before retrieving the puppet, Fallon asked Conan, "You were the host [of Late Night] for 16 years. Then...what happened?" Conan put his arm around Jimmy and said, "Don't you worry about that; you're a young guy!"

=== Robot on the Toilet ===
A classic sketch where Conan reveals the character who is then wheeled out on stage sitting on a porcelain toilet. After a few moments of silence, we suddenly hear the clang and clatter of metal falling into the toilet, followed by the robot raising its robot arms in celebration.

=== SAT Analogies ===
Conan helps students with their standardized exams by providing satirized SAT analogies based on current events. Although the newest SAT format introduced in 2005 has dropped analogies, the segment continues to be used in new episodes. A typical example: person who sees a pregnant woman: "you're glowing": person who sees a pregnant Nicole Richie: "who stuffed an avocado in that cocktail straw?" The sketch often ends with an analogy involving Paris Hilton that makes a joke about her sexual history, for example: Final episode of "The Sopranos": lots of guys getting whacked resulting in messy loss of bodily fluids: Paris Hilton: popular hotel heiress

=== Syncro-Vox ===
This sketch relies heavily on the low-budget filming method Syncro-Vox. A TV screen is lowered over the first guest's chair. On the screen is a still image of a celebrity, with live video of the mouth of the back stage impersonator superimposed—because of this method, the fake interviews are also called the "Clutch Cargo routine", after the 1959 cartoon, that is the most widely remembered user of Syncro-Vox. Commonly impersonated celebrities are Arnold Schwarzenegger (who always tries to promote his 'smash hit holiday classic', Jingle All the Way), George W. Bush, Barbara Bush (whose voice is portrayed as a gruff New Jersey man), Bill Clinton, Hillary Clinton and Martha Stewart (either of whom if, nagged by Conan about a point they wish to dismiss, will begin talking in a demonically deeper voice as their eyes glow red), Michael Jackson, Sammy Sosa, Barry Bonds, Rafael Palmeiro, Donald Trump (who will frequently describe things with the adjective "Trump," proclaim his accomplishments to be "yuge," and respond to Conan's correcting him with "you're fired!"), Saddam Hussein, Tom Cruise (who often shouts triumphantly and raises his fists or feet, in reference to his infamous "Couch Jumping Incident" on Oprah), Mike Tyson, John Kerry and Keith Richards. Most of the impressions are done by either Robert Smigel or Brian Stack.

This bit was parodied, along with the entire show, on Robot Chicken's Star Wars special. O'Brien provided his own voice.

Both this and Desk Drive were later lifted by the German late night show Die Harald Schmidt Show.

=== Quackers ===
Quackers was a white domesticated duck who first appeared on the August 6, 2007 show during a sketch. The sketch involved Conan nervously reacting to various band members shouting at him, only to learn they were being literal. For example, one band member shouted, "Conan, Duck!" and Conan dove for cover behind his desk, only to learn the band member was pointing out a duck was in the studio. Conan, noting the audience's apparently positive reaction to the duck, dubbed it Quackers. Two nights later, Quackers made a return appearance, during which the duck unexpectedly defecated on the studio floor and then rubbed its own beak in it as if eating, simultaneously prompting riotous laughter/howling from the audience and a horrified response from Conan, who referred to him as "Quackers the Shit-Eating Duck". The August 10 and September 4 shows included a "special announcement" about a new show coming to NBC, the family sitcom "Quackers the Shit-Eating Duck." Quackers also displays an ability to mug to the audience for applause. On the September 19 episode, Conan notes Quackers' popularity amongst viewers again and also mentions Quackers' popularity on YouTube. The episode also contains a clip of Quackers as an action star.

=== The Walker, Texas Ranger Lever ===
This sketch sprang from General Electric's purchase of entertainment company Universal in early 2004, creating NBC Universal. Conan claimed that this purchase now allowed him to play clips from the show Walker, Texas Ranger starring Chuck Norris without paying any royalties via a special prop lever. When pulled, the lever would trigger a supposedly random clip from the show, usually taken wildly out of context and often featuring Chuck Norris performing an implausibly heroic feat or a villain committing a shockingly cruel act. The camera would then cut back to a typically stunned Conan.

In most instances of the sketch, Conan would comment after at least one clip that the sketch was finished before immediately pulling the lever "one last time." In late summer 2004, the bit was seemingly retired once Chuck Norris walked in and fired a prop gun at Conan. Norris also revealed his own lever and pulled it, playing a clip showing him mock-fighting Conan with martial arts moves in the back of the studio. The lever did return on occasion in 2005.

Notably, the premise of the bit was technically a fabrication, since Walker was owned by CBS, Sony Pictures Television, and a few other companies; Walker merely ran on NBC Universal-owned USA Network at the time.

Variations on the sketch include other short-lived triggers such as a Knight Rider pull chain and a Beverly Hills Cop Theme button. Sometimes these were combined, such as playing the Beverly Hills Cop theme behind a Walker, Texas Ranger scene.

In 2007, the lever returned, playing clips from various B-movies once again starring Norris.

The lever also sparked its share of the Colbert/O'Brien/Stewart feud once Norris started appearing with 2008 presidential candidate Mike Huckabee and Conan took credit for the outcomes.

In the penultimate episode of Late Night, Conan revealed that the lever had been the most requested sketch by fans.

In 2010, during Conan's live Legally Prohibited tour, the "Walker, Texas Ranger lever" was reintroduced, used in the shows by Conan as well as by guests. However, to avoid potential legal issues with NBC claiming use of intellectual property, the lever was rechristened the "Chuck Norris Rural Policeman Handle", and featured clips from Walker that were not used previously on Late Night, with the exception of the aforementioned clip with Haley Joel Osment, which was featured at the end of every "Rural Policeman Handle" segment.

The lever returned again four years later on Conan's current show on TBS when he traveled to Dallas from March 31 to April 3, 2014 on the last night. As he no longer worked for NBC, he instead showed different clips featuring Chuck Norris from Walker — the same clips showed during the Legally Prohibited tour — again, with the exception of the clip with Haley Joel Osment, which was shown at the end of the segment.

A digital version of the lever designed as a browser extension by developer was released in 2015.

=== Nerding It Up For Pierre ===
In this bit, Conan tries to explain a popular news story to graphic designer Pierre Bernard (See "Pierre Bernard's Recliner of Rage" above) by relating current events to obscure events in various anime or science fiction shows that Pierre understands and enjoys, such as Battlestar Galactica. A previous version of this sketch was "Dumbing It Down For La Bamba", where Conan would use basic, often childish language when describing current events to the band's trombonist.

=== Questions From The Audience ===
Conan reflects on the fact that he has had a long and varied career. He offers to field any questions from the audience on some of the celebrities he has met or any other interesting aspect of his life in show business. However the questions from the audience always relate to obscure topics such as how best to grow a plant or car maintenance advice. Conan expresses disappointment that the question is not about his career.

=== 60 ===
A parody of the Fox series "24". "60" takes the premise of 24 to the extreme: each one second episode takes place in the same minute. The story revolved around Canadian Special Agent Chuck Aloo (Andy Blitz) attempting to protect the Prime Minister from a diabolical plot involving a sandwich with mustard in it.

=== "Andy's Little Sister, Stacy," ===
The 1997 inaugural iteration of the running sketch was the first sketch written for the show by writer Brian Stack. In the skit, Amy Poehler, who was Stack's former colleague from their Chicago improv days, plays the 13-year-old younger sibling of O'Brien's sidekick, Andy Richter, whose unrequited crush on O'Brien manifests in a range of emotion that runs "from adorable bashfulness to volcanic, homicidal rage." Stack would later say of Poehler in a 2021 Washington Post interview, "I’ve always been in awe of her incredible talent, but seeing her, Conan and Andy [Richter] have so much fun in that sketch is an especially wonderful memory for me and I’ll never forget it."

=== Artie Kendall the Ghost Crooner ===
The ghost of an old-fashioned lounge singer (played by Brian Stack) who worked in the studio during the 1930s when it was a radio studio. Kendall's song lyrics reflect antiquated views that offend Conan. Kendall later reveals he was killed by the League of Women Voters, who, offended at Kendall's misogyny, made him dig his own grave before beating him to death with the shovel.

Like Hannigan the Traveling Salesman, the old-timey tone of Artie Kendall was partially inspired by Stack's love of old movies like Thin Man and My Man Godfrey. Stack was also inspired by the fact that Rockefeller Center had been in operation since the 1930s, and that radio singer Bing Crosby had "sort of a dark side" in his personal life that did not appear in his onscreen persona. The numerous songs Kendall sings all have different lyrics — he usually first croons a song topical to the 1930s, then a sexist song about women, then, when Conan gets offended at Kendall's lyrics and displays what Kendall refers to as his "Irish temper", a song about the Irish. Each song, however, has exactly the same melody and arrangement (which also happens to be exactly the same melody Bathtime Bob sang).

=== Audience Interview ===
In this bit introduced in mid-2005, Conan says that because he's always interviewing famous celebrities, who endorse their latest movie/album/etc., he rarely gets an opportunity to talk to the audience, which he says he'd like to do. So, for a change of pace, he says he's going to go into the audience, pick out a random member, and ask them some basic question. However, the gag is that the audience member he "randomly" picks is always a celebrity, who faithfully reveals him/herself when Conan asks what their name is and who always sits on the first seat immediately right of the aisle of the back row in the far righthand section. They also happen to still endorse some product, or even a standard "latest work" as well. Some examples of guests include Ted Danson, Jerry Stiller, Alan Alda, Bob Saget, Jerry Springer, Donald Trump, Mr. T, Fabio, and Larry King.

=== Audience Talent ===
Conan goes into the audience and selects pre-picked audience members to show their unique talents, but the person's "talent" is obviously faked. Conan does not know who the people are going to be, and the audience does not know what their talent is until Conan reveals it. This was a very similar precursor to the Audiencey Awards.

=== Billy Tyler, the Kid No One Loves ===
A little boy named Billy Tyler would come out talking about all the hardships he has endured in his life, each one more pathetic than the last. Finally, when Conan offers him words of encouragement and advice, Billy rejects them, screams "You're a loser!" at Conan, and runs off.

=== Cloppy ===
A depressed and suicidal horse whose name is a reference to the "clop-clop" sound he makes as he slowly walks offstage to shoot himself. In one interview, actor Nicolas Cage expresses his fondness of Cloppy. Subsequent editions of "Cloppy" have included mentions to Cage's endorsement of the sketch.

=== Conan and Max Hang Out ===
Conan introduces a moment of camaraderie between him and Max, then cuts to a scene of Conan in his dressing room. Max comes in and enthusiastically invites Conan to go somewhere, such as to lunch, to grab a beer, or to shop at the NBC store because it has great stuff. Conan happily agrees, but as soon as the two begin walking together they awkwardly do not speak to each other and look bored. The camera follows them like this down hallways and elevators until they reach their destination, at which point they quickly grab the food or drink and part ways. The sketch may include other sight gags, such as Conan also being seen shoplifting several items from the NBC store.

=== Conan Babies ===
Appearing in the show's early years on Friday nights, this sketch was introduced as the day's earliest Saturday morning cartoon (since, technically, the Friday night shows aired in the early hours of Saturday). The title was a take-off of Muppet Babies and the sketch itself was a parody of low-budget 1970s cartoons, featuring very limited animation of Conan, Andy, and Max as babies getting into adventures. Conan, Andy, and Max provided their own voices, and mouths, in the same Syncro-Voxed style as their Fake Celebrity Interviews. Most of Max's dialogue consisted of the word "caca" and each sketch would end with the three babies incongruously breaking out into song, à la The Archies or Josie and the Pussycats.

=== Conan's Diary ===
After interviewing an attractive female celebrity, Conan occasionally opens his "Hello Kitty" diary and writes about the interview while the celebrity remains in the interview chair. The audience and celebrity can hear a voiceover of what Conan is writing. Conan admires his own interviewing skills, then notes that he thinks the celebrity has a crush on him. The celebrity, feeling awkward, asks him to stop writing. Conan audibly notes that the celebrity is an "insane bitch", and finishes writing.

=== Conan Sings a Lullaby ===
Conan explains that many viewers are new parents trying to get their baby to sleep and he will help them, so he begins to sing a nice lullaby with the aid of his acoustic guitar "Bessie Lou" (also the name of his desk, guest chair, and couch) and then takes advantage of a baby's lack of understanding of language and mentions things adults would find horrible in a soothing way. After a while, Conan figures that his main audience is getting bored, so after telling the parents to turn the baby away from the TV, he starts showing humorous and sometimes violent pieces of footage. With the baby now asleep, Conan tells the parents to go have sex.

=== Dudez-A-Plenti ===
Conan decides to form his very own boy band following the success of the Backstreet Boys and the show Making the Band. He calls for an audition, in which he picks 5 buff young men: Elliot, Professor P, Iago, the Kid Man, and Samantha. In their first group meeting, they think of ideas for their first hit song, only to come up with the words "Baby" and "I Wish". This leads to their first "hit" single: "Baby, I Wish You Were My Baby". The group reunites one year later to record their first music video for a new song called "Awesome", which includes the word "awesome" 28 times according to Conan.

=== Emergency Guest ===
In this recurring skit during the show's early years, Conan announces to the audience that a regularly scheduled celebrity guest has unexpectedly cancelled their appearance at the last minute. In order to fill out the air time, Conan brings out the "emergency guest" which is a life sized mannequin in a large glass "break in case of emergency" box. After being placed into the guest chair and activated by Andy, the mannequin plays recorded messages which feature typical banter for late night talk show guests such as name dropping other celebrities he's seen at parties and requesting a clip from his latest movie be played. Conan frequently struggles to keep the conversation in-sync. The mannequin also reassures the audience that there's no need to panic. Often, the Emergency Guest malfunctions and needs to be deactivated before the interview is over. Conan then walks into the off stage hallway and breaks out the Emergency Emergency Guest, a minor celebrity such as Nipsey Russell or Joyce Brothers who makes a cameo appearance

=== European Guy ===
Conan begins to discuss some political issue negatively affecting America, and is interrupted by Gustavo, a European who smugly and arrogantly points out Europe's superiority over America. He appears in strange clothing (particularly shoes) and frequently eats strange lollipops, all of which have stereotypically silly European-sounding names (Stolflucht, Flexenfüsser, etc.), which he defends as superior to their American equivalents, in spite of their peculiar appearances

=== Friends of the Show ===
Conan is frequently visited by Mr. T, Abe Vigoda, and James Lipton as themselves, who appear in bizarre situations on the show. Abe Vigoda is often poked fun of for his advanced age, fueled by the false reports of his death in the past. Memorable bits featuring Vigoda involve him being found in odd places by Conan, such as under the audience risers, being dressed up as a character such as "Viyoda", and using the extra screen space afforded by the widescreen 16:9 HDTV format to shoot baskets, with Vigoda on one side of Conan and the basket on the other. Mr. T appears both in the show's regular segments, such as Celebrity Secrets, and in remotes, such as going to an apple orchard with Conan. Lipton typically appears to lend his serious acting abilities to humorous situations, such as a dramatic re-enactment of Christian Bale's 2009 profanity-laced tirade towards a director of photography, with Lipton playing both Bale and the crew member.

=== The "Fun Hole" Guy ===
Conan gets interrupted by a man in the audience (played by Brian McCann) who wears a blue T-shirt with a sweater around his shoulders. He complains about lack of decency, takes the sweater off and storms off, revealing him wearing fishnet stockings, and a shirt that says "Fun Hole" on the back with an arrow pointing down to his speedo-clad buttocks.

=== Good Priest, Bad Priest ===
Conan's Catholic church pastors, Father DeCarlo and Father Kelly, would come on the show and subject Conan to an interrogation related to some sort of upcoming religious celebration (such as why he does not have a manger for Christmas). Most of the time, they start to abuse Conan by bringing up his "touching himself" nightly. Father DeCarlo acts as the "Good Priest", asking questions calmly, while Father Kelly would act as the "Bad Priest", trying to intimidate Conan. Towards the end of the sketch, Jesus enters, resulting in Conan exclaiming "Jesus Christ!", and tells the priests to leave Conan alone, and recruiting them on a more important mission, usually abusing figures such as Santa Claus and the Easter Bunny. The sketch ends with Jesus telling Conan and the crowd "You owe me one... you all owe me one!" In recent episodes Jesus has been joined by Mary (resulting in Conan yelling "Holy Mother of God!") and Joseph (resulting in Conan yelling "Jesus, Mary, and Joseph!"), then the skit ends with Jesus, Mary, and Joseph going to the Olive Garden and running into God then awkwardly having a conversation about God being Jesus' real father.

=== Guest Autographs ===
Conan shows the audience some autographs supposedly from guests on his show. In reality, the fictitious autographs are often from celebrities who have appeared in news or tabloids rather than on the program. The messages left by the celebrity often mock something unseemly the celebrity is currently known for or may even mock O'Brien in some way.

=== Guys That Make Fun of Conan's Name ===
In the first year of the show, Conan would occasionally point out that he has an unusual first name that often makes people think of Conan the Barbarian. The show would then cut to four guys who stand around and make bad jokes about Conan's name, such as "Conan the vegetarian, hey, where's your salad?" or "Conan the Yogi Bear-ian, hey, where's Boo-Boo?" For unexplained reasons, one of the four guys in the sketch would always nod in agreement, but never speak.

=== Instant Audience Member Upgrade ===
A take-off on the airline instant upgrade, Conan chooses two audience members and bumps them up to first class audience, where he gives them more comfortable chairs, a drink, a celebrity feature, a curtain to separate them from the economy class audience section, etc.

=== Moral Dilemma ===
Not seen since Andy Richter's departure (although he was barely involved), the bit involved Conan looking through the show's Lost and Found box, and finding something he wished he could keep. At that point, a devil would appear on Conan's shoulder to help him rationalize keeping the item. While he would acknowledge the logic behind the devil's reasoning, he would muse, "I can't help but wonder if there's another side to the argument." At this point, instead of the expected angel, a bear (an actor in a bear costume) would appear on Conan's other shoulder, announcing himself: "Hi, Conan, I'm your bear! Grrr!" Conan would ask the bear for his advice regarding the lost item, but the bear would only have bear-related advice to offer ("I don't know, but I can tell you that you should always check before sticking your nose into a beehive, for bears' noses are awfully sensitive to bee stings"). Usually, the bit would end with the devil getting one-upped in some way or another (in one such sketch, the bear turned out to be Conan's guardian angel in disguise).

=== New Foreign TV Imports ===
Noting the increasing number of imported television formats from regions such as Europe on U.S. television (such as Big Brother, Survivor and Who Wants to Be a Millionaire?), Conan presents "previews" of new international reality and game shows that have apparently been picked up by American networks. The "shows" wind up being either inane (such as Big Survivor—a Big Brother parody where the houseguests are the members of the rock band Survivor, the Japanese show Babies on Cinderblocks, and a game show from Iceland where contestants must name an Icelandic singer who is not Björk), sadistic (including the German game show Stackenblochen—where a contestant is beaten up by the host and their goons for not arranging items on a dresser on right angles in five seconds, and the Russian show Dyen illi Noch?—where workers at a forced labor camp in Siberia are woken up and asked whether it is day or night, and are shot in the head if they answer incorrectly), or otherwise invoke regional or religious stereotypes (such as the Indian show Arranged Marriage Island, Israeli show Touch the Hasidem, and the Middle Eastern show American Effigy—where effigies of American figures are judged by an American Idol-like panel).

=== No-Reason-to-Live Guy ===
Conan begins to talk about a mundane news piece or the guest line-up at his desk when he is interrupted by a man in the audience (played by Brian McCann). The man seems to have been misinformed and reacts to Conan's calm correctness in disbelief and yells, "There's no reason to live!" He then proceeds to run to the top of the audience area where a blue kayak is waiting, while yelling, "Where's my kayak?" He gets in the kayak and "paddles" it off-screen, at which point the scene cuts to a shot of a man in a kayak falling down an icy mountain. After this, another "audience member" usually rides off in a kayak in a similar way, or the first man comes back through the studio doors (sometimes in poor disguises), gets upset again (usually when Conan mentions how stupid the sketch is) and rides to his demise using another means of transportation, accompanied by related stock footage, again while yelling "Where's my [vehicle]?" The sketch usually involves three different "deaths." In addition to the kayak, other means of transportation have included a train, a bike, a skateboard, balloons, a three bedroom house, and a car.

This sketch evolved from a bit done a week or two before NBC broadcast the Torino Olympics where Brian McCann appeared on video as if he was reporting from the Bobsled run in Italy. He starts sliding down the course and Conan tries to tell him the course was not finished, based on news reports of the time that said Olympic officials were crunched for time to finish some of the venues. McCann says he cannot hear because of the noise of the bobsled then he says, "What's that?" and there is a quick cut to stock footage of a kayak falling down a snow-covered mountain. Then the show cuts back to Conan, who has his head in his hands as if embarrassed and the audience is howling in laughter at the absurd scene, especially after McCann's line: "Someone put me in a kayak!" When the next guest comments about the kayak, Conan says, "You try to find footage of a bobsled crashing that matches. It was the best we could do." For the record, the Olympic officials were putting finishing touches on the venues with only the nightly ceremonies park unfinished.

=== Patterns ===
Conan shows a series of images, and viewers have to figure out the progressive pattern that links them. For instance, "Squirrel, handyman, poorly guarded insane asylum, Tom Green: That's right, these are more and more likely to be missing a nut."

=== Pimpbot 5000 ===
A robot that "combines the classic sensibilities of a 1950s robot with the dynamic flair of a 1970s street pimp". He always talks in rhymes that simultaneously reference his robotic and pimp nature: "I got a diamond studded watch/new transistors in my crotch."

=== Pleasing the Affiliates ===
Conan attempts to please local affiliates by responding to their fictional requests for positive mention

=== Polly, the NBC Peacock ===
Conan is visited by Polly—a puppet of the NBC logo with a parrot-like voice—to discuss television programs airing during the current week. With Conan playing the straight man, Polly lavishes praise upon NBC's own programming, but criticizes the programs of competitors with increasingly outlandish comments, such as claiming that Tim Allen's face "spews dangerous radiation" when discussing the ABC sitcom Home Improvement, or remarking that "watching [JAG] officially fulfills your requirement for jury duty!" when discussing the CBS legal drama which originally premiered on NBC. The sketch usually ends with Conan suggesting the audience watch a non-NBC program, to which a flustered Polly replies, "It's in Spanish!"

=== Preparation H Raymond ===
In this sketch Brian McCann plays a large-eared man named Raymond with a Prince Charles-like appearance, who parades down the aisles passing out Preparation H to Conan's audience. While he possesses a common theme song, chorused by the phrase "Raymond's here to help....oooooooohhh...", Raymond's dialogue content is often related to current events such as the "roid" usage by pro baseball athletes or Thanksgiving, 2006. Often though, the sketch can be seen as a random assortment of ideas, all beginning and culminating with the distribution of Preparation H.

=== Queen Elizabeth Telephone Call ===
Conan receives a phone call from Queen Elizabeth II to discuss a current issue. Her Majesty quickly gets off topic, and ends every comment by referring to Conan using random bisyllabic words, such as Coughdrop O'Branflakes.

=== Rude Audience Member ===
While Conan is introducing the second guest, the camera repeatedly cuts to one audience member, with each successive cut introducing attention-grabbing sound and visual effects. Conan becomes increasingly agitated, chastising the person as if he or she is purposely making it happen. After he threatens to call security, the camera stays on Conan, and it seems like the distraction is over. Finally, the audience member is shown in a much more exaggerated way (for example, on a giant screen behind Conan, or on the Times Square Jumbotron) that completely disrupts the show.

=== Satellite TV ===
Conan shares the extra channels that the large satellite dish on the roof of 30 Rockefeller Center fictionally picks up. Some channels have absurd titles like "Clive Clemmons' Inappropriate Response Channel" (this particular channel displayed clips of people making inappropriate and/or completely off-topic statements in everyday conversation, after which fictional British heavy metal guitarist Clive Clemmons plays a riff and exclaims "Inappropriate!" One example had a woman mention the quality of the office coffee, to which her co-worker responded "Thank God for Saddam Hussein!"). Others include a pornography channel featuring "Max on Max action", in which Max Weinberg had sex with a duplicate Max Weinberg; the "Sexual Harassment Skeleton Channel", wherein a skeleton gropes women in the workplace but always avoids getting fired, with the argument that he is "only a skeleton" and "doesn't even have muscles to move his arms." There is "Jar Barf", a program wherein food jars with the middle of their lids cut out, and featuring added googly eyes, are shown vomiting their contents; the "Potato Judge TV", about a ruthless judge on the judicial bench; the "Men Without Hats Channel" that features people in everyday situations singing about them to the Men Without Hats song "Safety Dance".

=== The Slipnutz ===
A singing trio (Andy Blitz, Jon Glaser, Brian Stack) who were inconveniently booked on the same show with Slipknot (and later as "They Might Be Slipnutz" with They Might Be Giants). Their routine in its entirety involves them slipping and sliding on nuts scattered on the floor, while singing their theme song "We're The Slipnutz". They later promoted their greatest-hits album, which included the songs "Old West Cowboys Slipping on Nuts" and "Viking Raiders Slipping on Nuts". The band eventually broke up, with each member going solo. Slipknot, who enjoyed the joke, later actually had The Slipnutz open for them at one concert appearance; this was chronicled as a segment on the show. Their last appearance on Late Night included a tribute to the Slipnutz by Patti Smith, Coldplay, John Mayer, Los Lobos, and Steve Winwood, each of whom sang a version of "We're The Slipnutz".

=== Spoiler Alert ===
Conan and Max talk about a recent film, TV, or book-related story, but find a way to keep from spoiling the ending, in case the show is Tivoed, or a viewer has not read the book. So Conan employs a spoiler alert system, which consists of two people standing in front of the camera, covering their ears and yelling incoherently "la la la la la! I'm not listening", the result of which is that the audience is unable to listen to what Conan and Max are discussing.

=== Hannigan the Traveling Salesman ===
A hat-wearing traveling salesman (played by Brian Stack) from the 1950s who bursts into the studio, addresses Conan as "little girl", and runs through a scripted sales pitch in an attempt to sell Conan unfunny jokes, sketch ideas and other useless home products. Hannigan was created at the suggestion of writer Andrew Weinberg, who suggested that Stack play an "old-timey salesman". Stack wrote the sketches with Weinberg and Michael Koman, with whom he would later collaborate on the TV series Eaglehart. Hannigan's voice was inspired by Stack's appreciation for William Powell's Thin Man film series.

=== Unknown Colleges' Team Mascots ===
Conan presents about three or four fictional colleges' athletic teams' mascots. These mascots often have nothing to do with anything about the school's location or name. One mascot that always finds its way onto the segment is S&M Lincoln, a very disturbing version of Abraham Lincoln wearing a top hat and having a ball gag stuffed in his mouth, while being dressed in little more than leather S&M gear and being weighed down by heavy chains, while whipping himself with a cat o' nine tails.

=== What in the World? ===
Conan is shown an extremely magnified portion of a picture. He throws out a wild guess as to what he is looking at, at which point the picture is zoomed out a little. Conan tries again, although it's not yet evident what is depicted in the photo. It zooms out again, and the picture is now recognizable and seemingly mundane—for instance, a celebrity or other normal situation. The final time it zooms out, something unexpected or outrageous that had previously been out of frame is revealed. The opening audio cue for this bit is an annoying-sounding man saying, "What in the world?" which Conan often asks not to have repeated, to no avail.

=== Annual sketches ===
- The State of the Show Address - An elaborate parody of the President of the United States' annual State of the Union Address delivered in place of the show's opening credits and monologue on the same night the President gives his speech. When Conan mentions that there will be no monologue that night, the audience will stand and burst into hearty applause, after which Conan replies, "You bastards."
- Central Time Zone New Year's Countdown - Aired each New Year's Eve, Late Night was the only show to do a countdown to midnight for the Central Time Zone of the United States, since the show's regular time slot begins before and ends after midnight Central Time. After the monologue, Conan does a fictional list of people who have died that year, starting with a celebrity who has faded into obscurity who many assumed must have died, and continuing with many outlandish and random celebrities who are obviously alive. Each year the Late Night staff creates a bit when the New Year begins. In 2003, the bit was announcer Joel Godard lying on a table while an Asian man wearing a Speedo lands on top of him at the stroke of midnight. In 2005, giant papier-mâché busts of Chicagoans James Belushi and Oprah Winfrey inched slowly towards each other and "French kissed" at the stroke of midnight. Earlier remotes had Conan going out to various remote locations in the Central Time Zone to celebrate the new year there. One bit had the remote correspondent already celebrating the new year in South Bend, Indiana (which is in the Eastern Time Zone, one hour ahead of Central Time), but having to move to the Central Time Zone city of Hudson Lake, Indiana in a race against time in order to "correctly" celebrate the new year. The 2004 and 2005 celebrations also had O'Brien joined by a group of costumed revellers (representing various Midwestern locales) including:

- Abraham Lincoln (Springfield, Illinois)
- A Green Bay Packers "cheesehead" fan
- Dorothy from The Wonderful Wizard of Oz (Kansas)
- Prince (Minneapolis)
- A gaucho from Belize (Belize is in the same time zone as the Central US)

The countdown did not air on New Year's Eve in both 2005-06 and 2006–07, as these dates were on Saturday and Sunday night respectively. NBC carried live specials with Carson Daly on these occasions. Another such special aired for 2007-08 (a Monday night); a writer's strike meant Late Night could not have resumed its Central Time countdown that year in any event. By 2008-09, the Carson Daly specials had supplanted the special New Year's Tonight and Late Night episodes permanently (repeats of both shows followed the live special).

- Sweeps Ahoy - Airing during or just after each "sweeps month", this sketch airs bits and doctored footage of previous Late Night publicity stunts the show did to increase their ratings.
- World's Fastest Menorah and Other Holiday Icons - Usually shown for a period of 3–4 days after the annual lighting of the Rockefeller Center Christmas Tree, Conan always mentions that so many people come to New York just to see the tree, usually adding things like, "It's just a tree! Big deal!" He then says something like, "Rockefeller Center might have their Christmas Tree, but we here at Late Night have the World's Fastest Menorah!" This summons the menorah, which sits on a platform pulled by a string by a stagehand, flying by the camera lever. Of course, the platform is not visible in the camera's field of vision. The menorah is accompanied by a quick excerpt of "Hava Nagila". As the week progresses, Conan introduces other holiday icons, which include a bungee-jumping Baby Jesus (accompanied by Handel's "Hallelujah"), a rocket-powered fruitcake (accompanied by ZZ Top's "La Grange"), and a Kwanzaa kinara in a pimped-out ride.
- A Look Back - Sometime around New Year's, a retrospective of the past year on the show. Conan and Max sit at a mini-bar on stage with party decorations, their ties undone, and recall their many adventures.

An alternate version is presented in the form of a newsreel, with Joel Godard narrating events of the year over real footage, intercut with relevant Fake celebrity interviews from the past year.

=== During the 2007-08 writers' strike ===
In November 2007, a Writers Guild of America strike forced Late Night and other late night TV shows into reruns. The show would resume production on January 2, 2008; the strike still continued, however (it would not conclude until February 12, 2008), forcing the show to refrain from using any of its regular sketches or characters. As such, a small series of new sketches was devised to keep viewers entertained, or to just kill time. These sketches included the following:

- Ring Spin - As he has done for years during rehearsals, Conan began spinning his wedding ring on his desk, attempting to break his record of 41 seconds. The closest he came was 40 seconds until the February 8, 2008 broadcast when, with the help of MIT professor Dr. Peter Fisher, he spun the ring for 51 seconds on a piece of teflon. On June 8, 2008, the bit appeared again, this time with Conan accepting a challenge from guest Ted Koppel. Conan won the challenge by a mere 3 seconds, with a total of 30 seconds against Koppel's 27. On November 6, 2008, scheduled guest Katt Williams failed to show for his guest spot (it was later revealed he had been arrested on weapons charges). To fill some time, Conan performed a ring spin - saying that two historic events could happen within a 24-hour span.
- German Disco Light Show - By pressing a button Conan starts a light show similar to one seen at a "bad German disco." This has been done several times using various musical tracks.
- Guest Maze Entrance - To increase the length of time taken for celebrities to reach the desk, a short maze is erected between the entry point and the desk. An overhead camera shows the guests' progression through the maze.
- Who Made Huckabee? - Conan had a recurring mock feud with Comedy Central hosts Stephen Colbert and Jon Stewart regarding who was responsible for the success of presidential candidate Mike Huckabee. Conan noted that the popularity of Huckabee's high-profile supporter Chuck Norris was the result of his own Walker, Texas Ranger Lever sketch, therefore "Conan made Huckabee." Colbert, on his show, then claimed that "Colbert made Huckabee" after giving him the "Colbert Bump." Following a series of cross-show statements, Conan, Colbert and Stewart each put forward increasingly farcical reasons why he was responsible for Huckabee's success, insulting their rivals in the process. Eventually, a large (and silly) fight scene amongst the three was staged on Late Night. Huckabee himself appeared afterwards to state that none of "these three idiots" created him, but in fact the "great nation of the United States had created him".
- Zipline - On January 14, 2008, Conan lived out one of his "dreams" by riding a zipline over his audience while wearing a helmet which shoots smoke out the back. Conan then asked viewers to send in suggestions on how to improve this stunt via Late Night Underground. Two days later, Conan repeated the zipline this time with rockets strapped to his feet and crashing into large bowling pins. Another variation of this sketch is when he went down the zip line and knocked down John Wilkes Booth as he was about to assassinate Abraham Lincoln.
- Crew Interview - Conan also filled in some of his episodes by interviewing Late Night's behind-the-scenes crew members, such as the propmaster or the special effects man, in which he would play around with the items in their workspaces, such as the breakable props.

=== Assassination ===
Conan invites a guest who supposedly is privy to an upcoming, well-kept secret, who suffers a simulated death before he can reveal what he knows. For example, shortly before the final episode of Seinfeld, an actor appearing on the show began talking about what the final episode would be about; a few words in, an assassin shoots him in the chest. On another occasion, Conan introduced a man who claimed to be a high-ranking executive with Coca-Cola, who was going to discuss the soda's secret ingredients. As the interview started, the "executive" fell dead after getting hit by shuriken, and a group of ninjas with the Coca-Cola logo on their backs were shown running away from the stage. These sketches have not appeared on the show for several years.

=== Awful Sports Chanter ===
In response to an upcoming sporting or other spectator event, Conan advises that you should keep chants short and easy to follow. As an example of what not to do, a sports enthusiast (played by Andy Blitz) is shown in the audience, and begins a standard chant for that event while clapping each syllable (such as "Let's Go Mets!"). However, instead of repeating the line, he expands it into a very long chant that begins supportive and usually ends up as a narrative of some sort, occasionally asking the audience to chant along as if it's easy to follow. Conan interrupts the chant to go to commercial as Blitz continues to chant up to the break.

=== Car Chases ===
Conan explains that television shows' ratings go up when they cut to a car chase in action. He tells the audience that Late Night will begin doing this, however there are no car chases in Manhattan due to traffic congestion, so Late Night stages their own "car chases". While played as if they are real car chases, they are executed using Matchbox style vehicles, and model buildings in the hallways of the show's backstage area. The toy cars are pulled by fishing line as a camera gets a shot appearing to be from a helicopter. More recently, car chases have been shot when celebrities have encountered legal difficulties, including Michael Jackson, Paris Hilton and O. J. Simpson. The sketch has not been seen since early 2008.

=== Carl "Oldy" Olson ===
An old man portrayed for comic effect by William Preston similar to Larry "Bud" Melman from Late Night with David Letterman, though Oldy is somewhat frailer but more vulgar.

=== Conan O'Brien College Band Search ===
For a few years, Late Night held an annual college band search.

=== Conan's Legs ===
Conan explains how the show is trying to reach out and collect more viewers by taking a page out of the Today Show handbook. He explains that many Americans tune into the Today Show just to see Katie Couric's legs. The front of his desk is removed, revealing feminine legs. He continues by doing a few camera tricks such as moving his legs, bouncing a ball, and even shaving them. In actuality, the front of the desk is covered by a greenscreen substituted by a shot of a woman's legs recorded live offstage. The audience is presumed to understand the special effect, leading O'Brien to attempt to sync more complex actions with those of the offstage actress, or sometimes to intentionally fool her. The sketch stopped some time before Couric eventually left Today to anchor the CBS Evening News.

=== Continuity Errors ===
Conan and Andy review a recent broadcast for errors, discovering inconsistencies that no one seemed to have caught, such as Conan suddenly having a receding hairline or wearing a bib while eating a giant pie.

=== Frankenstein Wastes a Minute of Our Time ===
Frankenstein's monster (played by writer Brian Stack) appears by one of the doors leading from the main set, acting excited about something, and inviting the cameraman (and the audience, vicariously) to come with him to take a look. He makes a long trek around the backstage area, stopping along the way to wave the cameraman to keep following. Invariably, what he finds is extremely mundane like a spatula, although it is usually near something that is considerably more interesting, and Conan assumes that is the item Frankenstein led the camera to. Frankenstein once found Tom Hanks (who was not a guest on that night's episode) during the sketch, and pushed him out of the way to show off a light switch. (Hanks then immediately reentered the frame to join in pointing out the light switch with great enthusiasm.) The joke format is extremely similar to a shaggy dog story. Universal Pictures owned NBC, and the character's makeup design and the sketch title's logo resemble the ones from the classic Universal films.

=== The Hole In The Floor ===
There is a hole in the floor in front of Conan's desk. Conan throws objects through it and generally hassles an office worker below. The hole is created using bluescreen technology.

=== Jerry Butters ===
Jerry Butters (played by Brian McCann) is a talentless talk show host with his own early-morning show down the hall. His set is bland and reminiscent of a 1970s talk show with fake palms and dull brown colors. Jerry will interrupt Conan's show in the style of a suburban neighbor who initially wants to just have a friendly chat, but eventually needs a favor or some advice for a particular problem he is facing in his current show. Such problems in the past have included Abe Vigoda dying midway through an interview (after Jerry had asked him which was a better experience, his part in The Godfather or the children's comedy Good Burger). He also invariably promotes his own show by addressing Conan's audience with the line "It's on at four in the morning... so check it out!".

=== Krunk ===
During the first two seasons of the show, beginning in early 1994, O'Brien encouraged guests to insert the word krunk, a fictional expletive with multiple uses invented by the show's writers that "the censors don't quite know what to do with yet", into their conversations.

=== Mick Ferguson, The Guy Who's Awfully Proud of his Bullet Proof Legs ===
Long-time staff writer Brian McCann, in a mock-Vaudeville dance, sings "Oh I got bulletproof legs, I got bullet proof legs, oh ya can't hurt me cuz I have bullet proof legs! Oh they cost me a fortune but ya don't...." Invariably, a shadowy figure pulls out a gun and shoots him in the chest, which apparently is not bulletproof. In the second incarnation of it, the same man is standing on the screen and Mick implores Conan to get rid of him because he shot him before. Conan has a security guy come out and check the figure over stating that he does not have a weapon. Relieved Mick begins his song and dance again, only to have the Security guy pull out a gun and shoot him in the chest. Another incident has the security guard and a search dog guarding Mick. After Conan calms Mick's fears of the security guard by vouching for him, the search dog pulls a gun and shoots Mick in the chest. The camera then switches to Conan, who looks into it and says, "We're gonna get to the bottom of this."

=== The More You Know ===
These are spoofs of the famous NBC public service announcements. They were used frequently in earlier years, especially when Andy Richter was still Conan's sidekick. These sketches would begin seemingly innocently, but would quickly devolve into parody, usually involving dark themes. For example, in one such sketch, Max Weinberg commands: "Sometimes condoms break; deal with it, missy!"

=== Segue Sam ===
When Conan struggled for the right words to preview the next guest, he called on the services of Segue Sam, portrayed by Jon Glaser. The impeccably dressed and debonair Sam was pulled into the studio by a butler as he reclined on a couch. Sam invariably was able to provide a witty, smooth segue to the next guest.

=== Staring Contest ===
A famous skit held while Andy Richter still served as O'Brien's sidekick. An homage to the game show Make Me Laugh, Richter (unlike O'Brien) would be subjected to a series of purely physical-comedy skits taking place behind O'Brien, usually insulting and disgusting, which would eventually force Richter to look away. On the last episode Richter served as sidekick, the show subjected O'Brien to the skits instead; this was the only time Richter ever won the staring contest. The two tied after one competition in which, as a distraction, Albert Einstein was inspired by a large-breasted woman in a bikini to add the "squared" to his theory of special relativity, and Andy and Conan joined them in a celebratory dance.

=== Tomorry the Ostrich ===
During the break between the first and second guest, Tomorry the ostrich would come out to deliver the blue card with a list of tomorrow night's guests. Tomorry would lay an egg containing the card. Tomorry was a large ostrich with a long, solid neck that members of the audience often pulled on as Tomorry passed by.

=== Nobody's Watching ===
An occasional sketch performed when Conan anticipates that Late Night would have poor viewership (such as from people being "tired" of watching TV on October 3, 1995, the show being preempted to a later time slot by the NBA playoffs, or having to compete with the 1998 Winter Olympics airing live against it on CBS). He declares that the show could pretty much do anything it wanted "because nobody's watching", leading to activities such as "borrowing" Carnac the Magnificent (under the pretense that Johnny Carson wouldn't notice) and smoking on-set, revealing that Dr. Joyce Brothers is legally required to make an appearance on the show every four months (with Brothers promptly walking into and out of the studio to "Eye of the Tiger" without actually being interviewed), making on-air "confessions" (including Conan confessing that most of the show's staff were children, and Al Roker confessing that he thought becoming a weatherman could lead to a career in acting), and other surreal bits.

=== Conan of the Night ===
Seen limitedly in the early part of the 2000s these sketches began with Conan putting on a fake mustache, using a cheesy Spanish accent, and playing out a film noire-style sketch in which a murder was investigated or caused. One such sketch ended with the mustachioed Conan "throwing" a knife into Max's chest.

== Monologue digressions ==
- Anna Nicole Smith Impression – Conan imitates her nonsensical mutterings, drug-induced wandering, and outbursts. He will wander back and forth in front of the camera, muttering, and finally jumps out with the "cat hiss", also seen in the Late Night Cat digression. Not seen since her death.
- Arnold Schwarzenegger Impression – When a topic comes up referring to the actor, Conan will often put on an Arnold Schwarzenegger accent, speak in a pseudo-Germanic language, pretend to eat a giant sausage (Conan claims he "likes his Arnold to be eating a sausage at the end") while flexing his muscles and giving a "death-stare" to the audience.
- Awkward Throws to Max Weinberg – Conan usually begins his monologue by saying "We've got a good show tonight, isn't that right Max?" to which Max replies in an intentionally nonchalant tone, "Yeah", then usually shrugs. One such awkward throw started with Max saying, "Mmm-hmmmm" in a satisfied matter, prompting Conan to blurt out, "I didn't ask, 'How's the rice, Uncle Ben?'!"
- Congress/Parliament applause – If one of his jokes gets lukewarm applause, Conan will liken it to members of Congress or Parliament clapping along. He'll also say "Yes, very good, O'Brien", or something to that effect, in a somewhat aristocratic tone.
- Donald Trump Impression – Conan's impression of Donald Trump has him tugging on his hair, sucking his cheeks in, using Trump's catch phrase, "You're fired!" and performing Trump's python hand move as The Max Weinberg 7 plays the intro to The O'Jays' "For the Love of Money", which is used as the theme song to Trump's NBC show The Apprentice. This bit is usually performed any time that Trump is mentioned, whether in the monologue or in interviews or comedy sketches. Conan has performed this bit with Donald Trump himself present in the studio on more than one occasion.
- Eating a Tear – Conan sometimes will say something that will cause him to shed, and then eat, a tear. This is pantomimed by running a finger from his eye down his cheek to his mouth.
- George W. Bush Impression – When there's a news story or any reference to President George W. Bush, Conan will often look away from the camera, as if distracted by something, then look straight back at the camera with a confused look on his face, exclaiming "Huh?"
- Geraldo Rivera Impression – When there's a news story or any reference to news personality Geraldo Rivera, Conan often places his index finger across his upper lip, denoting a mustache.
- I love you too, sir – If an audience member screams something (often admirable) at Conan, he makes a joke such as, "I love you too, sir" or "It's nice of my dad for coming."
- "I'm-a Gonna Go to Hell When I Die" – a rousing gospel-styled song, started on November 12, 2004, that has no lyrics other than its title and is always accompanied by a rhythmic clapping beat. The audience will usually start clapping along, causing Conan to exclaim, "Don't clap along to that, that's terrible!" Occasionally, Conan has recycled the tune with a new title/lyric, notably "I Had an Unhappy Childhood and You Have to Pay". This is often sung by Conan after the audience finds one of his jokes distasteful, many times when referring to Star Jones. Another variation, sung in a different tune, is "I'll Be Beaten to Death When I Leave Tonight".
- International Symbol for Larry King – Conan pretends to pull suspenders away from his body, then makes spectacles with his thumbs and forefingers. He then explains that this is the International Symbol for Larry King, comparing it to the equivalent for choking.
- "Keep cool, my babies!" – Often spoken immediately before his monologue as a response to thunderous applause, Conan will utter this phrase in order to calm his excited audience. "Keep cool, my babies!" is often followed by "The String Dance".
- Making Fun of LaBamba – Conan sometimes looks over toward band member Richie "LaBamba" Rosenberg when there is a homosexual or unsavory reference in the monologue. LaBamba usually reacts by staring back at Conan with a bemused, disappointed, or "deflated" look on his face and/or shaking his head. Conan usually proceeds to explain that LaBamba would not be surprised by the reference if he would just attend the rehearsal.
- Making Fun of Products – Conan will mock a certain product or brand. He then asks the producer if said brand is a sponsor. The producer answers "yes" before Conan lets off an uncomfortable laugh.
- Miscellaneous Pantomiming – Conan will duck in and out of frame, while making a whooshing sound.
- Nerd Impression – When nerds are mentioned in Conan's monologue (such as in the context of "Star Wars/Star Trek/The Lord of the Rings/The Matrix nerds"), he sometimes alters his voice to sound like a "nerd" criticizing Conan for that joke. This usually involves pushing his "glasses" up the bridge of his nose, wagging his finger, bucking his teeth, waving an invisible lightsaber, using sci-fi related quotes, or saying something like, "How dare you", or "I'll get you, Conan O'Brien!" and pushing the buttons on an invisible calculator. On Tonight, he has added turnings of a Rubik's Cube. Coinciding with the release of Harry Potter and the Half-Blood Prince in theaters, Conan has placed an invisible sorcerer's hat on his head and drawn the lightning bolt on his forehead (as if he were Harry Potter), then waves an invisible wand while saying in his nerd voice, "I strike at thee!"
- Producer Impression – Often, when Conan says something especially odd or stupid, he will say that the producer is looking at him and then imitates the producer with a serious tone and expression, often crossing his arms, then poking fun at his impression's similarity to Jackie Mason.
- Rhetorical Set-Up Questions – Conan frequently introduces a monologue joke by asking a rhetorical question about whether or not the audience has heard of a certain event; he then gives them no time to respond, and criticizes them for being uninformed.
- Smoothing the Eyebrows – Conan quickly licks the tips of the index and pinkie fingers of one hand, and uses them simultaneously to smooth his eyebrows.
- The Late Night Cat – Conan jumps out of the frame and disappears with a whooshing sound, as in "Miscellaneous Pantomiming" for a few seconds before reappearing extremely close to the camera, out of focus, and hissing at it in a feline manner (complete with "claws" extended). This usually occurs when the studio audience dislikes a joke told in the monologue.
- The Shark Attack – Conan leaves the screen, crouches down just enough and walks past the camera so that only his red pompadour is visible.
- The String Dance – Conan mimes attaching strings to his hips and pulls them, shaking his hips back and forth until he "cuts" one of the strings, dropping the "attached" hip. The string dance is customarily performed before the monologue during the audience applause, or during the monologue, but Conan has also performed the dance at the request of guests. Jim Carrey also chose to perform his own version of the string dance on his appearance in December 2005. Justin Timberlake, Ice-T, MC Hammer, The Rock, Paula Abdul, Usher, Matt Bluhm, John Tesh, and Christina Applegate have also performed the dance. Houston Texans wide receiver David Anderson performed it as a touchdown celebration during the 2008 season. In the epilogue of the February 12, 2009 episode of Comedy Central's The Colbert Report, host Stephen Colbert "stole" Conan's strings in retribution for Conan's departure from New York to Los Angeles. As "ransom" for the strings, Colbert demanded Conan's return to New York. On February 18, 2009 Conan's opening monologue expressed disdain over Colbert's theft of the string dance and openly challenged him to the rights of the dance. Colbert then emerged from backstage to the surprise of the audience. The audience responded with a mix of ecstatic cheering and mock jeering for Colbert and encouraged a string dance-off. Colbert "won" by "tying" string around Conan.
- Tom Selleck Impression – Similar to the Geraldo Rivera impression except Conan places two fingers across his upper lip to convey a thicker mustache.
- U.S.A. Chant – Most usually done when he has redeemed an obviously bad joke with a good one, Conan sometimes celebrates by beginning a chant of "U.S.A! U.S.A!" As soon as the audience joins in, Conan immediately stops and stares at them.
- Unusual Audience Reactions – Conan is always amused by, and makes fun of, the unusual reactions of his audience to some of his monologue jokes. The most common reaction is a horrified/angry "booing", morphing into "polite laughter and applause", which Conan admits is his favorite reaction. Another audience reaction is delayed laughter to a punchline, sometimes sparking Conan's "Delayed reaction always creeps me out" song, in the style of "I'm-a Gonna Go to Hell When I Die".

== Late Night sketches appearing on The Tonight Show ==
=== Moral Outrage ===
In response to a recent news story, usually about misconduct, Conan speaks at length about his moral outrage, and his feeling of responsibility to remove this type of behavior from society; meanwhile, the camera occasionally makes brief cuts from Conan to Max. Conan may also speak of a dim-witted accomplice who aids the deviant in his exploits, after which the camera briefly cuts from Conan to LaBamba. Finally, Conan urges the public to expose such people using the show's address which, together with the heading "Shameless Adulterous Weasel" or the like, is superimposed over Max.

=== In the Year 2000/3000 ===
The sketch is typically performed with Conan sidekick Andy Richter participating, but after Richter left Late Night, the celebrity guest would participate (when Richter was scheduled as a guest, he would again take part). Each guest version would usually be titled "The [guest's surname] Edition" with "2.0" added for guests who have done the sketch more than once. In 2006, the naming format was changed to simply "The [guest's name] Edition". Its introduction is as follows:

Conan: "... It's time, once again, to look into the future."
Andy/Guest: "The future, Conan?"
Conan: "That's right, Andy/[Guest's name]. Let's look to the future, all the way to the year 2000!"

During an "In the Year 2000" sketch, O'Brien, Andy or the guest, as well as band member Richie "LaBamba" Rosenberg, each wears a black robe and futuristic-looking collar and hold a lit flashlight to their face. Between La Bamba's chant of "In the year 2000...", O'Brien and Andy or the guest alternate delivering jokes, often based on current events, in the form of humorous predictions of what will happen in the year 2000. Quite commonly, the second-to-last prediction involves Conan mocking his guest, while the last prediction involves the guest mocking Conan in return. This sketch is very similar to one Conan performed with the Happy Happy Good Show in 1988.

The sketch was created prior to the actual year 2000, but the show's writers decided to keep the named year the same even after the passing of that year, in a sort of ironic twist. However, when the sketch was revived on The Tonight Show with Conan O'Brien, Richter heaped ridicule upon O'Brien for failing to update the name of the skit nine years after the year 2000 had passed. The sketch is renamed "In the Year 3000", with the black robe (referred to as a "ratty smock" by Richter) being replaced with a more futuristic-looking outfit consisting of a large metallic collar with a series of blinking lights, which Conan said were very expensive to make and Andy said smelled bad. Appearing on Tonight June 3, 2009, it was the first Late Night sketch to be carried over to Conan's Tonight Show. The open to the sketch included narration by William Shatner and, on one occasion, George Takei.

=== Celebrity Survey ===
In this sketch, Conan has supposedly sent out questionnaires to celebrities and he reads their replies. Conan reads a question and then recites the answer that each of three celebrities gave. The answers of the first two celebrities are ordinary "straight" answers. The third is the gag answer and often relates to something unseemly about the celebrity. For example, to the question: "I like to think of my viewers as people who..." Brian Williams wrote "want to be informed." Meredith Vieira wrote "want to be my friend." Tony Danza wrote "have broken both arms and can't change the channel." A running joke has the survey frequently including a question which is answered by O.J. Simpson somehow referring to committing murder. To the question: "My favorite time of day is..." Evangeline Lilly wrote: "Dawn." Matt Lauer wrote "Twilight". O. J. Simpson wrote: "Murder O'Clock." A reply where Paris Hilton is the final respondent to a question was used in every segment for at least four years running, usually about her promiscuous dating habits. O'Brien and bandleader Max Weinberg have been used as well, with answers that perceive O'Brien as a loser and Max as a pervert. Another running gag has both Larry King and Kirstie Alley answering, usually poking fun at Larry King's age and Kirstie Alley's weight.

Reintroduced on The Tonight Show on June 5, 2009 and later reintroduced February 1, 2012 on Conan.

=== Noches de Pasion con Señor O'Brien (Nights of Passion with Mr. O'Brien) ===
A Spanglish telenovela parody, which Conan announces that they have made specifically for the NBC-owned Telemundo Spanish network. Conando (Conan with a fake mustache) is the hero of the piece, fighting mild villains to save the beautiful damsel in distress, usually from an abusive boyfriend or entering into a forced marriage, in most episodes. Each episode features a dramatic entrance, to which the villains bewilderedly ask "¿Conando?", the damsel swoons "¡Conando!" and to which Conan even more wildly replies "¡Si! ¡Conando!" In almost every sketch, Conando defenestrates the villains, making extensive use of stock footage. Quite often the sketch would include ridiculous phrases which one would not often use in daily conversation, but are common in Spanish-learning texts. Also, on occasion, the sketch would include long and complicated speeches which are obviously and extremely voiced-over. Also, on occasion, the sketches would include long and complicated speeches which Conan himself would rapidly read off cue cards with the speed, grammar mistakes, pronunciation and agility of an advanced level high school Spanish student.

Reintroduced on Tonight June 8, 2009, and performed many times on Tonight, Richter is introduced as Conando's sidekick Nachito, who always shows up when Conando is about to make love to the damsel, thus spoiling the romantic mood. In one sketch, the damsel did not end up with Conando but rather Mario Lopez.

=== The Audiences Awards ===
Conan awards members of the studio audience for various talents. Typically this will always include "best celebrity impression" to highlight lookalikes (as in movie casting), and then a variety of other awards which are achieved with props and superimposed images. For example, the winner of "Best Foreign Language Audience Member" was shown with a large superimposed moustache and sombrero, and the "Audience Member Who Smells the Most Like Fresh Salmon" was attacked by a man in a bear costume. Awards show intermission segments (red carpet, how the award is built, etc.) are also parodied.

Reintroduced on Tonight June 16, 2009, and later reintroduced again on Conan on June 21, 2011.

=== Movie casting ===
A fictitious new made-for-TV movie is announced, based on a real-life event Conan has mentioned. Conan then says he has the inside scoop on the movie's casting. Viewers are shown two photos side-by-side of a person or thing who will be portrayed in the movie and the person that will be playing the role. The casting first starts off with people who strikingly resemble the person they are playing but then goes off to extremes with, usually, objects or fictitious characters bearing some resemblance to the person they are playing. The humor is in how similar the two photos are despite how vastly different the two people/things pictured are or vice versa, with Conan often commenting on how great the casting is. Running gags include President George W. Bush being played by Ralph Wiggum, Patrick Star, or a deer in the headlights, Joe Biden being played by Bob Barker, Hillary Clinton being played by Chucky, Condoleezza Rice being played by Snoop Dogg, Donald Rumsfeld being played by Skeletor, and Dick Cheney being played by The Penguin.

Reintroduced on June 17, 2009.

=== Mike Merritt's Inner Thoughts ===
As Conan speaks on a recent news story dealing with race, the camera cuts to bassist Mike Merritt, as the audience hears his inner thoughts regarding Conan's lack of knowledge on racial issues and his attempt at "trying to be black." He also makes note of the scant number of black people in the studio, which usually includes only him and an audience member, or crew member, who is either hired for the show or whose skin is heavily made up to look tan. He would sign off by calling Conan a "pasty-faced pumpkin head", just before Conan finishes his speech by saying, "...because we're all part of this beautiful mosaic that is mankind", while believing that the audience is applauding for him.

Reintroduced on Tonight July 7, 2009, with Conan commenting on that day's memorial service for Michael Jackson. Has been seen on Conan on TBS as well.

=== New Coins/Stamps ===
Conan says he has "connections" which allow him to show "New" (fake) state quarters, euros or commemorative stamps. The stamps are usually states based on people or current events. The state quarters insult the state they are based on, and the Euros insult the country they are based on. One such Euros skit led to the creation of Conan O'Brien Hates My Homeland.

The new coins sketch was reintroduced on Tonight July 13, 2009.

=== Photo Gallery ===
Conan, Max, and announcer Joel Godard have recently had a party and Conan displays the ridiculous and fictional events of this party. These events typically include heavy drinking and rather gory violence or homicide on the part of one or the entire cast. Towards the end of the bit they are always joined by a celebrity, played by an actor with a superimposed picture of the celebrity at hand. The celebrity usually ends up getting into a fight with Conan, Joel, or Max, or is seen in compromising positions and/or situations, always looking back at the camera with exactly the same look, since the superimposed picture never changes. Before his death, Carl "Oldie" Olsen, played by William Preston, was usually in the party instead of Joel Godard.

Reintroduced on Tonight July 21, 2009, featuring only Conan and Andy, and their trip to the beach.

=== Hanging Out with Jordan Schlansky ===
During the 2007-08 writers' strike, O'Brien interviewed various members of his production staff, including associate producer Jordan Schlansky. Schlansky had previously been featured as an extra in various skits, but was first prominently featured in a segment in which Conan visited Skywalker Ranch, in which Schlansky corrected a variety of erroneous statements made by O'Brien's guide (for example, observing that a Darth Vader costume the guide claimed was used in Star Wars: A New Hope was, in fact, a replica due to its lack of Hebrew lettering present on the original).

O'Brien questioned Schlansky about various topics: including his feelings on working for O'Brien, his skill with a bullwhip, his appreciation for the band Rush, and his healthy eating habits. During the interview O'Brien found Schlansky to be totally unfazed by his boss's jokes or antics, reacting to most with a stoic demeanor. At the end of the segment, O'Brien thanked Schlansky, commenting, "I can't believe you're a real person."

The positive reaction to the Schlansky interview led to an episode where Jordan and O'Brien had dinner at an Italian restaurant, with O'Brien purposefully trying to annoy and embarrass Schlansky throughout the bit, without apparent success. When O'Brien moved from New York to Los Angeles, most of his staff moved with him and found places to live, except for Schlansky. O'Brien and a realtor helped Schlansky find a house, with O'Brien again trying unsuccessfully to provoke an emotional reaction from Schlansky. Throughout subsequent sketches O'Brien would make more pointed criticisms of Schlansky's various tastes and lifestyle, specifically mocking Schlansky's fascination with Italy and coffee.

Schlansky's bizarre worldview and demeanor proved to be popular with viewers, leading to various segments centered on Schlansky, such as a trip to Italy and his inclusion in various remote segments.

=== Conan on the Aisle ===
Conan and Andy review movies released in cinemas around the time of the sketch's original airing. Initially called 'Conan and Andy on the Aisle', until Richter left Late Night. Conan and Andy usually comments on a negative quality which is either fictitious or exaggerated by an edited scene he then shows as proof. For example, when Conan was reviewing Jurassic Park III, he mentioned that the movie had scenes that were disgusting and weird. A scene then appeared where a couple ran and were surprised by a dinosaur which opened its mouth to roar. Late Night edited the couple's lost child into the dinosaur's mouth, and the child says "hello" to the parents. The sketch occasionally reviewed TV shows. For example, Conan poked fun at the then-new television series Viva Laughlin claiming the producers missed some key signals of the show's poor quality. A clip of the show featuring one of its musical numbers appeared interspersed with footage of a "crew member" who, horrified at how terrible the show is, suddenly activates a TNT detonator and the scene switches to stock footage of an imploding building.

Reintroduced on "Tonight" August 4, 2009.

=== Brian McCann on the Spot ===
During the monologue or opening segment, O'Brien mentions a big news item and says Brian McCann is on the scene and cuts to him via a "remote feed", which is actually McCann standing in front of a greenscreen backdrop. McCann gives an increasingly absurd report that involves a variety of gags, such as the backdrop turning into a slideshow of various landmarks as he attempts to convince O'Brien that he is taking a tour. At one point McCann is seen wearing a pantsuit and blond wig in a report about Hillary Clinton. Throughout the sketch McCann becomes increasingly frustrating to O'Brien, who wanders off his set and shows up on McCann's screen and knocks him unconscious with a breakaway chair. The camera angle shifts to show the green screen was right next to Conan's set. As McCann is revealed to be faking unconsciousness, O'Brien then derides his acting and wonders if he will lie there for the rest of the bit.

McCann has also done a remote feed of sporting events, such as NBA Finals and U.S. Open, where he had Kevin Garnett, Doc Rivers, and Tiger Woods to interview, though they did not appear on screen. But at the end, the interviewees come out, partially hiding themselves, but only to reveal that it is actually Pierre Bernard. Then O'Brien would knock out McCann with an object.

When reintroduced on Tonight August 24, 2009, O'Brien did not hit McCann with a chair. Instead, McCann just walked out of his shot and into O'Brien's (a running gag in the satellite interview sketch), followed by Bernard, who portrayed the Obama family off screen, and an elderly man playing Brett Favre, who appeared earlier in the broadcast.

=== Pender Sings ===
Trumpeter Mark Pender is invited by Conan to sing a song about a current event. Pender begins normally, but upon reaching the refrain, he loses control, or he would intentionally climb over the railing into the audience, eventually writhing around on the floor within the top of his voice shouting "baby" over and over again until Conan finally stops him. The rhythm of the song is typically the same, with different lyrics each time.

Reintroduced on Tonight August 28, 2009, when it was incorporated into the "Conan, Please Blow Up My Car" contest.

=== The Interrupter ===
A melodramatic villain (played by Brian Stack), the Interrupter constantly interrupts Conan by finishing his sentences for him, always knowing exactly what Conan is going to say, even when it's denigrating to the Interrupter himself. He appeared in a black cape, purple ruffled shirt, long black hair and a handlebar mustache. Occasionally, if the sketch runs long enough, the roles will eventually become reversed, with the Interrupter starting sentences and Conan doing the interrupting. Eventually, the sketches evolved so that the first celebrity guest, and O'Brien himself, would replace the Interrupter as the one interrupting.

Reintroduced on Tonight on September 3, 2009 and reprised for Stack's final show on Conan on April 2, 2015.

Stack and Nikki Glaser performed a variation of the Interrupter bit at O'Brien's 2025 Mark Twain Prize ceremony.

=== Small Talk Moment ===
Conan and Max make small talk about a particular subject. The result is usually that both Max and Conan, bantering back and forth, end up going into extreme detail or citing obscure people and events. Once they have exhausted the subject, Max stops and says, "Wow, Conan! Talking about (this subject) sure is interesting", to which Conan enthusiastically responds, "IT SURE IS, MAX!!!" They then stare at one another in dull fashion as the camera cuts back and forth between them.

Reintroduced on November 23, 2009 when Max returned from his tour with Bruce Springsteen. The topic of the first return sketch was soccer.

== Miscellaneous ==
- The Growl - Conan often gives a Bob Hope- or Roy Orbison-like growl at attractive women, sometimes accompanied by barking or meows and hisses while miming a "clawing" motion.
- The Microphone - Conan will sometimes knock over the microphone on his desk for a quick laugh. Once in a while, he will knock it over and then jokingly threaten the audience, such as "I'll clear this studio if I have to", and "...fill it with a minty foam." He also states on occasion that the microphone is made of chocolate or marzipan. He also has been known to put the desk microphone up to his face and breathe heavily into it while staring wide-eyed. Occasionally, he will take his clip-on microphone and stick it up his nose "just because the producer hates it".
- The Conan/Max staredown - Similar to the Small Talk moment, but without any dialogue, Conan and Max will stare at each other blankly for a long time with the cameras switching between Conan and Max. Eventually, Conan seems to get creeped out and looks away. He then says that someone should discover a way to "bottle that chemistry."
- Conan Cost Cutting - After a sketch involving Tim Harrod in an expensive "Grub Man" costume, the show began to re-use the costume in order to amortize the cost. It appeared as a "surrendering croissant", a "victorious cannoli", a "liposuctioned Jabba the Hutt", a "pissed off kreplach", and a "beach rock." At the end of any sketch involving the costume, Conan mentions how many different ways the costume has been used and a "per costume total", which is the cost of the original costume divided by the number of uses. He'll then invite viewers to mail in their suggestions for a further use for the costume and, in return, will receive an "I'm a Conan Cost Cutter" button.

- The address for viewers to send in their own suggestions for use of the Grub-Man costume was:

Grub-Man Costume Ideas c/o Late Night
30 Rockefeller Plaza
New York, NY 10112

- A variation on this bit was used when the show acquired an expensive whale costume for a single sketch, and then devoted an entire "Whale Week" to whale-related bits, ostensibly to get their money's worth from the costume. The whale costume in question has been used with decreasing frequency since.

- Chip Whitley - Conan has joked at times that his real name is "Chip Whitley" and that "O'Brien" is a character. In 2014, Conan and Dave Franco made a Tinder profile using the name "Chip Whitley".
- Mike Koman - Koman, one of the show's writers, often plays a sketch character. Whenever he does, Conan is guaranteed to needle him in some way, as when he was the "M.I.T. Nerd" or "Donald Trump's Brother".
- The Evil Puppy - This bit involves a puppy, often a golden retriever, sitting on a throne of skulls, flanked by black-robed Druids, all of this under a red light, while O Fortuna plays in the background. Often, as the camera shows close-ups of the puppy squirming around on the chair, the audience will "awwww" at its cuteness, as Conan warns that the puppy is going to "conquer the world" or "suck your liver out through your eye sockets." Usually appears on Friday the 13th. Sometimes, the Evil Puppy's powers are portrayed causing pain and humiliation through supernatural means.
- Jeff Won't Talk - Conan pokes fun at the show producer, Jeff, who is only ever seen shaking his head on camera and gesturing for Conan to move it along.
- Faulty G.E. In-house Voice Directory System - Conan reveals the company's voice-operated directory's voice recognition system, powered by General Electric, "doesn't work." Here, Conan will request the name of a person he wants to be directed to. However, the system brings up only a similar-sounding name or a totally different name, after a prolonged pause. He also uses song verses and random sentences for hilarious results.
- The Gentler Side of Grand Theft Auto IV - Since the release of the highly anticipated video game Grand Theft Auto IV, Conan has presented game footage that does not display any acts of violence or sexuality. Typically, the player-controlled protagonist Niko Bellic would proclaim random things about himself and society in a friendly, humorous way, as opposed to the game's actual extremely graphic nature.
- Ginger, NO! - A fake interview is set up with a staff member when all of a sudden Conan says "Ginger, NO!" The camera then cuts to a German Shepherd who raises a handgun and shoots the interviewee.
- Late Night Sausage Party - On nights when all of the guests are male, Conan complains about the 2008 film The Women, and how there are no men in the movie—not even extras! He counters this by having all male guests and a gravelly voiced announcer begins the "sausage party" by announcing the guests and making crass and inappropriate remarks regarding their sausages.
- Dubble Letter Week - A whole week of episodes was scheduled in which the guests had double letters in their names. (i.e. Ted Koppel, Larry King). (Max once reacted with disappointment, saying that he wished he had a double letter in his name, to which Conan responded, "Oh, but you do, Max." Max was then subjected to the Ass Stamp, with the double letter in 'ASS' highlighted.)
- This Show Will Not Air - Conan does something very outrageous or over the line, but reassures the audience by saying that "This show will never air."
- Hold for Editing - When a joke bombs Conan will sometimes pause for a few seconds and say, "Hold for editing." He will then resume the monologue or sketch as if the section containing the bad joke will be removed from the show before it is broadcast.
- Conan's second generation Ford Taurus - On several occasions, Conan had expressed pride in his car, a green 1992 Ford Taurus SHO. He actively sought to sell it and went so far as to have it appraised at Sotheby's and Christie's auction houses despite being extremely dirty and having mechanical problems. The car was finally "sold" to actor Brad Pitt during one of the final shows, however a sketch during his debut on The Tonight Show revealed that he still owned the car.
- The Show Is Cheap/NBC Has No Money - Conan frequently made jokes commenting about the show being cheap, especially during sketches where bad special effects or shoddy-looking costumes/graphics were obvious. Often he would also make references to how NBC did not want to pay for anything.
- "That was stupid." - Much like the "This show is cheap" comments, whenever there was an especially bizarre sketch or a bad joke, Conan usually commented about how dumb or stupid it was before moving on.
- "Gotta go, move it along." - If a joke/sketch ran especially long or if Conan was wasting too much time he would often mock his producer by saying "Gotta go, move it along!" in a deep voice.
