= Brian Stack (comedian) =

American actor, comedian, and writer (born 1964)

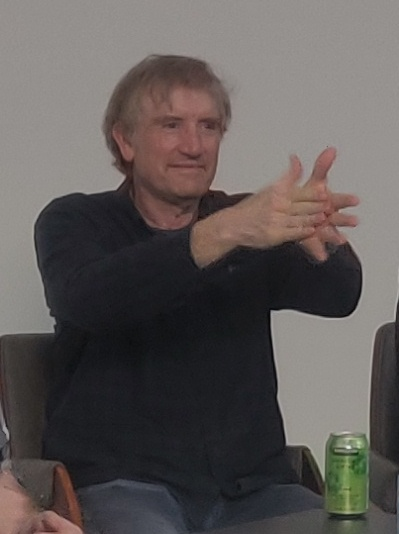
- Brian Stack applauds castmates at a staged table read of Know-It-All on March 10, 2026
- Born: August 18, 1964 (age 62); Chicago, Illinois, U.S.
- Education: Indiana University Bloomington (BA); University of Wisconsin–Madison (MA)
- Occupations: Actor; comedian; writer
- Years active: 1992–present
- Spouse: Miriam Tolan (m. 1996)
- Children: 2

Brian Stack (born August 18, 1964) is an American actor, comedian, and writer best known for his sketch comedy work. He worked on all three late-night talk shows hosted by Conan O'Brien: Late Night with Conan O'Brien and The Tonight Show with Conan O'Brien on NBC, and Conan on TBS. Stack left Conan in April 2015 to join the writing staff of the CBS series The Late Show with Stephen Colbert.

== Career ==
Stack got his start in comedy with the improv comedy troupe The Second City in Chicago, working alongside fellow comedian Amy Poehler.

=== Late Night with Conan O'Brien ===
Stack became a sketch writer on Late Night with Conan O'Brien in 1997 and served as a writer and actor on the show. The first sketch he wrote for the show was the inaugural iteration of the running gag "Andy’s Little Sister, Stacy," in which Stack's former Chicago improv colleague Amy Poehler portrayed the 13-year-old younger sibling of O'Brien's sidekick, Andy Richter, whose unrequited crush on O'Brien manifests in a range of emotion that runs "from adorable bashfulness to volcanic, homicidal rage." Stack later said of Poehler in a 2021 Washington Post interview, "I've always been in awe of her incredible talent, but seeing her, Conan and Andy [Richter] have so much fun in that sketch is an especially wonderful memory for me and I'll never forget it."

Stack first appeared onscreen when one of the writers asked him to play a doctor in a sketch in which he had no dialogue. One of the first characters he did on the show was Bathtime Bob the Hygiene Cowboy, who sang about bath time, but, like many of Stack's characters, there was a dark, tragic underbelly to his upbeat nature. Stack had previously tried to develop this character at Second City, but it never appeared in any shows.

Stack played many recurring characters on the show, most notably those clad in anachronistic or elaborate outfits, and he was known for playing many characters with long beards and mustaches, such as God, Zeus, Socrates, Gandalf, Dumbledore, and The Interrupter. Jeff Loveness of Jimmy Kimmel Live has observed of Stack's characters that there was "such a sadness to each character, but they would not acknowledge their sadness", an assessment that Stack agrees with. Stack has further explained that, "My favorite kind of comedy on the late-night has always been the non-topical silly stuff where it's not really at anybody's expense. My least favorite kind of joke is a celebrity joke, because it tends to be very familiar or sometimes very mean, and if it's not mean it doesn't even work, usually...But my favorite kind of comedy on late night is at no one's expense but the character that's involved in the sketch where you're not really going after anybody." Stack remained with O'Brien after O'Brien's move to The Tonight Show in 2009, and made occasional appearances, such as when he played an NRA spokesman who intimates violence to accomplish his agenda.

Among the characters he portrayed:

- Artie Kendall the Ghost Crooner
- Fantastic Guy
- Frankenstein Wastes a Minute of Our Time
- Hannigan the Traveling Salesman
- The Interrupter
- The Slipnutz
- Bullet Proof Legs Assassin, a man dressed in all black who always shoots the "Bullet Proof Legs Guys" at the end of every sketch.
- Clive Clemmons, British heavy metal guitar legend with his own satellite TV channel filled with his favorite inappropriate responses from everyday life.
- Ira (of Jeremy & Ira), performed with Late Night writer Jon Glaser (as Jeremy), as two bizarre men from another dimension dressed in black hoods, who would visit Conan & Andy from time-to-time, always appearing in the corner of the TV screen. They never speak, and only communicate through nodding and other gestures.
- Kilty McBagpipes, an extremely stereotypical Scottish man who dresses in a kilt and dances to bagpipe music.
- Steve St. Helens, a stagehand on the show whose temper rises until he erupts. The character first appeared when Mount St. Helens began showing activity in early 2005.

Stack also created the recurring segment "Pierre Bernard's Recliner of Rage", and his voice work on the show included providing the voices of numerous celebrities parodied in the Syncro-Vox faux interviews conducted by O'Brien, including Dick Cheney, Mike Tyson, and Martha Stewart.

=== Conan recurring characters ===
Stack continued his work on O'Brien's TBS series, Conan. His last episode aired on April 2, 2015, with Stack in a sketch as The Interrupter where he and his character bade farewell to the series.

Among his recurring characters:

- James Sinclair St. Wallins, Audiencey Awards fashion correspondent.
- Brian LaFontaine, singer on "Basic Cable Name That Tune", who performs awful, thinly veiled alterations of famous songs to avoid royalty fees. Conan frequently expresses his contempt for this character, making comments such as "Hate that guy" or "Easily my least favorite person".
- Voiceover of Minty, the Candy Cane That Briefly Fell on the Ground, singing the theme song for "Minty the Candy Cane Who Briefly Fell on the Ground" (played by Brian McCann).
- Joe Galliano, John Galliano's 'brother' whom Conan interviews, generally in response to comments made by John Galliano. Joe tries to defend his brother while changing into ridiculous hats every time the camera switches back to Conan.
- WikiBear, the voice of 2014 recurring character "WikiBear", a teddy bear who has a vast knowledge of general knowledge questions asked by Conan, but who quickly veers off topic into tangents on very disturbing facts.

=== The Late Show with Stephen Colbert ===
After fellow Second City alumnus Stephen Colbert succeeded David Letterman as the host of the CBS series Late Show, Stack left Conan, and returned to New York to take a job on the Late Show writing staff. He voices the characters of "Cartoon Donald Trump", "God," and "The Ghost of Abraham Lincoln" on the show, and frequently appears as various characters in the show's cold open.

=== Other work ===
Stack played "Special Agent in Charge" in the 1997 movie Spaceman.

Stack played Howard Jorgensen on the NBC sitcom 30 Rock in the episodes "Jack Meets Dennis", "Succession" and "Larry King".

Stack co-starred as "The World's Tallest Nebraskan" in the Comedy Central animated series Freak Show in 2006.

Stack played Mark, an employee of the Buffalo branch who becomes angry when learning the branch is being shut down, in "Company Picnic", the May 14, 2009 fifth-season finale, and 100th episode, of the American version of The Office.

Stack played a cop in "First Date", the April 4, 2013 second-season episode of the FOX sitcom New Girl. That same year, he appeared as Ted in the TV series Parks and Recreation, a role that recurred into 2014 in the penultimate episode, "Two Funerals", airing on February 17, 2015.

On October 13, 2013, Stack played Don in the Aqua Teen Hunger Force season ten, episode season "Piranha Germs". On July 26, 2015, he played Mappy the Map in the season eleven episode "Knapsack!"

On May 15, 2014, Stack appeared in a sketch titled "Tear Down" in "Craig Robinson Wears a Bordeaux Button Down & Dark Jeans", the second episode of the third season of Comedy Bang! Bang!

Stack is a frequent performer in the ASSSSCAT improvisational comedy show at the Upright Citizens Brigade Theater in New York City and Los Angeles.

=== Voice work ===
He provided voices for numerous characters in the video games Deer Avenger (1998) and Deer Avenger 2: Deer in the City (1999), which were written by Stack's fellow Late Night writer/actor Brian McCann, and which co-starred McCann, Tina Fey, Jon Glaser, and Amy Poehler.

In 2000, Stack played "Whiskers" in "Western Day", the December 6, 2000, pilot episode of Robert Smigel's TV series TV Funhouse.

In 2011, Stack provided the voice of the lead Marmoset in Rio.

In 2012 Stack provided the voice for the Airplane Pilot in Hotel Transylvania.

Stack voiced the CEO, Dr. Internet Doctor, and Brian in the 2014 series Talking Tom & Friends.

== Personal life ==
Stack is married to actress Miriam Tolan, another Second City alum, regular performer at the Upright Citizens Brigade Theatre, and former correspondent for The Daily Show with Jon Stewart who has also appeared in the movie The Heat and on shows like 30 Rock, The League, At Home with Amy Sedaris and Jon Glaser Loves Gear. The pair wed in 1996 and have two daughters.

== Awards ==
- As a member of Late Night's writing staff, Stack won five Writers Guild Awards for Writing in a Comedy/Variety Series for 2000, 2002, 2003, 2005 and 2006. He was also nominated in 1999, 2001, and 2004.
- Stack was also nominated for an Emmy Award every year from 1998 through 2023 for Outstanding Writing for a Variety, Music or Comedy Program as a member of the writing team, winning in 2007. His 25-year nomination streak ended in 2024, when The Late Show was not nominated for a writing Emmy.

== See also ==
- List of Late Night with Conan O'Brien sketches
