= Institutum Divi Thomae =

Graduate research school of science in Ohio, US

The Institutum Divi Thomae (later called the St. Thomas Institute for Advanced Studies) was a graduate research school of science based in Cincinnati, Ohio, United States. The institute operated from 1935 to 1951 as part of the Athenaeum of Ohio, the higher education arm of the Roman Catholic Archdiocese of Cincinnati, and closed in 1988. It was closely associated with its only director, George Sperti. At its peak, the institute's faculty and students published hundreds of scientific and technical papers and developed commercial products, attracting the attention of religious and secular press.

The institute was a response to concerns that fewer Catholics entered science compared to Protestants. In an attempt to reconcile religion and science while avoiding secularism, Sperti and Rev. James A. O'Brien, a lecturer at the institute, promoted the teleological argument as a foundational principle. The institute focused on cancer research in an era before the war on cancer brought government funding to major research universities.

The institute admitted no more than 30 students at a time, through competitive examinations. The majority of the students were nuns from various orders, but lay students were also admitted.

== History ==
In 1935, Archbishop John T. McNicholas established the Institutum Divi Thomae (Latin for "Institute of St. Thomas") to complement the Athenaeum's seminaries and teaching college. He named as its director the inventor George Sperti, who had previously led the University of Cincinnati's Basic Science Research Laboratory and would soon be named to the Pontifical Academy of Sciences. The institute's first dean was Very Rev. Cletus A. Miller. It was housed in Saint Gregory Seminary until 1941, when it moved to a mansion in East Walnut Hills.

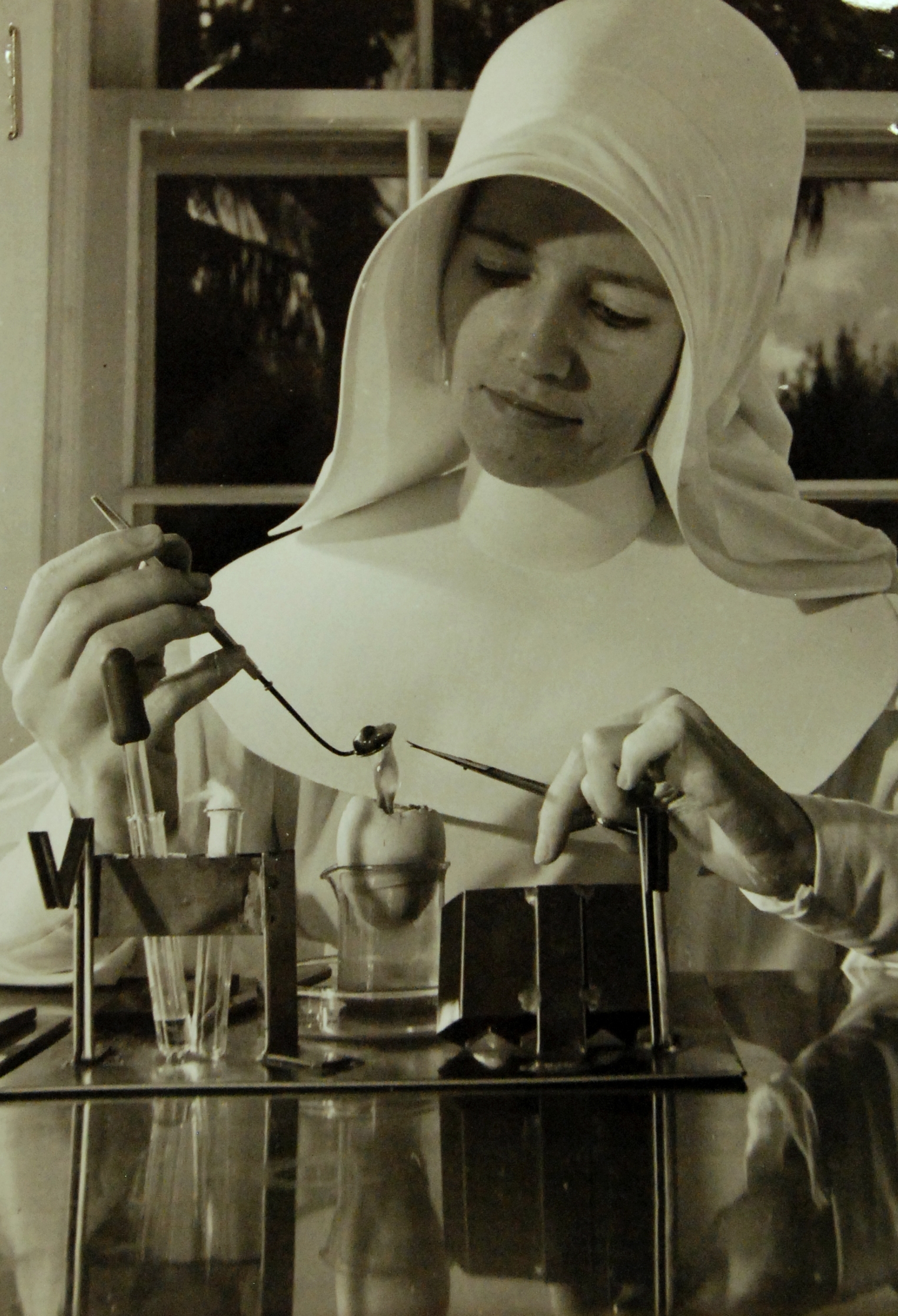
A Dominican sister at the institute's Palm Beach location prepares an ointment by extracting Bio-Dyne from a chicken egg.

A cell derivative believed to stimulate healthy cell growth was discovered at the school by Stanley L. Baker, Ph.D., and was originally tested on burn victims. The accidental application of it resulted in a huge market as Preparation H. The primary active ingredient in his invention was a compound containing a live yeast cell derivative (LYCD), which Sperti named Bio-Dyne. The Food and Drug Administration later discovered clinical testing irregularities in the use of LYCD, and it was removed from the formulation sold in the United States. There are stories that the original Preparation H was used to treat burns. The Canadian and European versions of Preparation H still contain the ingredient.

In 1941, a group of business partners led by automobile dealer Walter E. Schott purchased the Rookwood Pottery out of a bankruptcy sale and donated it to the institute the following year. Commercial operation was then transferred to Sperti, Inc.

By 1947, the institute had 14 affiliates across the United States as well as a floating laboratory, the Aquina. That year, the philanthropist William Donner donated a 64-room building in Palm Beach, Florida, with which the institute planned to build the largest marine biophysics laboratory in the world.

By the late 1940s, the institute began to lose focus as scientists like John Loofbourow left for other institutions and Sperti's various affiliated business interests, including Sperti-Faraday, faced mounting debts despite nearly $3 million in funding from the archdiocese. Archbishop McNicholas sought to bring these enterprises back to profitability, but concerns about institute finances were blamed for his fatal heart attack in 1950. His successor, Archbishop Karl Joseph Alter, rejected the mixing of religion and science and sought to separate the archdiocese from scientific pursuits. In 1951, he severed ties with the institute and forced the sale of Sperti-Faraday. By 1962, the archdiocese had recovered 40% of the more than $1.6 million in outstanding funds.

Sperti later renamed the now-independent entity to the St. Thomas Institute for Advanced Studies. In 1976, it awarded Archbishop Joseph Bernardin an honorary doctorate. It remained independent until the 1980s. As Sperti became ill, investors fought for control of the institute, shutting it down in 1988.

== Publications ==
The institute published research by its faculty and students in an academic journal, Studies of the Institutum Divi Thomae, from 1935 to 1947, with a hiatus during World War II. The archives of the Sisters of Charity of Cincinnati maintain a collection of news clippings and other materials related to the institute.

== Notable people ==
- George Sperti – cofounder
- Miriam Michael Stimson – chemist noted for work on spectroscopy and DNA
