= Brian McCann (actor) =

American actor, comedian and writer

Brian McCann (born August 16, 1965) is an American actor, comedian and writer. He is best known for his sketch comedy work on the late-night talk show Late Night with Conan O'Brien and more recently on The Tonight Show with Conan O'Brien and Conan.

After 17 years working with Conan O'Brien, McCann left Conan due to his plans to return to New York City. His final day on the show was August 30, 2012. McCann went on to write for shows such as Nikki & Sara Live and Totally Biased with W. Kamau Bell.

== Life and career ==
McCann was born and raised in Wheaton, Illinois, which he has described as "an extremely uptight (and dry) town". He graduated from Boston College in 1987. He has two older sisters, is divorced and has a daughter. McCann moved to New York in 1995 after hosting a stand-up comedy show at The Cue Club in Chicago, IL, when he became a sketch writer on Late Night with Conan O'Brien until the end of the show's run in 2009. McCann played many recurring characters on the show, most notably Preparation H Raymond and The Suicidal Kayaker. He also served as the warm-up comic that talked to the studio audience prior to each episode since 2000. McCann also wrote and provided many voices for the video games Deer Avenger (1998) and Deer Avenger 2: Deer in the City (1999). He is a graduate of the Player's Workshop of the Second City and the Second City Training Center.

McCann also made guest appearances on NBC sitcoms such as 30 Rock and Parks and Recreation.

It was announced that he would be leaving the show as of August 30, 2012. McCann made occasional pre-taped appearances later in September.

In November 2012, McCann was named as head writer for the MTV show Nikki & Sara Live. and in 2013 he wrote for the FXX series Totally Biased with W. Kamau Bell. He would eventually become head writer for The Kids Tonight Show, housed in the same NBC studio where Late Night with Conan O'Brien had taped.

== Late Night with Conan O'Brien recurring characters ==
- Adrian Foster ("but my friends call me Raisin"), a hippie folk singer playing an autoharp
- Eyeballs O'Shaughnessy, who expresses his emotions with the aid of various pairs of glasses that have eyes drawn in.
- FedEx Pope, who was billed as the show's least popular character even in his first appearance, as if he had previously appeared. He wears a white bathrobe and a FedEx delivery box on his head.
- Fun Hole Guy, an audience member who acts prudishly and derides Conan for his lack of decency, then stands up and storms off, revealing fishnet stockings, hotpants and a shirt with "Fun Hole" on the back and an arrow pointing down.
- Guy who is always confused about future guests, who is an audience member who appears during Conan's listing of future guests. His thought bubbles are visible to everyone, and he always thinks of the wrong person (either with a similar-sounding name, or one name the same as the guest announced), or is thinking of an object that is somehow similar to the guest's name.
- Jerry Butters, the 4 AM time slot talk show host across the hall - his favorite to perform.
- Kneesocks Jones
- The Loser, always somewhere e.g. "The Loser at the Beach", or "The Loser at the Golf Course". He always got attacked by a bear at the end of the sketch and said "Oh, No! Conan it's that damn bear again!"
- Mick Ferguson, The Guy Who's Awfully Proud of his Bullet Proof Legs
- "No Reason to Live"-guy, an audience member who becomes depressed by something inconsequential Conan says, and runs off to kill himself. After he runs out of the studio, stock footage (esp of a man in a kayak tumbling down a ski slope but other footage, like a cyclist pedaling off a bridge or a train plummeting off a mountainside) is shown, supposedly of the man killing himself. He then returns, unharmed.
- Pimpbot 5000, who combines the classic sensibilities of a 1950s robot with the dynamic flair of a 1970s street pimp.
- Preparation H Raymond, a buck-toothed, large eared man who sings songs about Preparation H, with a refrain of "Raymond's here, Raymond's here" while handing the product out to the audience, and eventually eating some from the tube.
- Robot on a Toilet
- Page from Attractive Camp, who walks with a long gait and smugly repeats that he "just got back from Attractive Camp".
- Terry Allen, a prospective late night host who schemed with Andy Richter to take over Conan's show in a four-part soap opera "Journey Past Midnight".
- S&M Abe Lincoln: A new character introduced in March 2007, he is Abraham Lincoln, complete with beard whiskers and stovepipe hat. Dressed in nothing but leather S&M attire, with a red ball gag stuffed in his mouth, as he walks across the stage he whips himself with a short cat o' nine tails. He usually lingers by the stage door, until the segment goes to commercial.
- Johnny G, a guy who thinks Max Weinberg is hilarious.

== The Tonight Show with Conan O'Brien recurring characters ==
- "Twitter Tracker" announcer

== Conan recurring characters ==
- Minty, the Candy Cane That Briefly Fell on the Ground: Introduced in December 2010, Minty is a candy cane covered in various pieces of garbage and insects as he "briefly fell on the ground." He also has a very catchy theme song.
- "Fight to the Death Building Battle" announcer

== See also ==
- List of Late Night with Conan O'Brien sketches
