= George Sperti =

Italian-American inventor

- Born: George Speri Sperti; January 17, 1900; Covington, Kentucky, U.S.
- Died: April 29, 1991 (aged 91); Cincinnati, Ohio, U.S.
- Education: University of Cincinnati
- Occupations: Inventor, researcher
- Known for: Preparation H; Sperti Ultraviolet Lamp; Aspercreme; KVa Power Meter
- Relatives: Mildred Sperti (sister)
- Awards: Member, Pontifical Academy of Sciences (1936); Order of the Star of Italian Solidarity (1956)

George Speri Sperti (January 17, 1900, Covington, Kentucky – April 29, 1991, Cincinnati, Ohio) was an Italian-American who invented Preparation H hemorrhoid medication. He also invented the Sperti Ultraviolet Lamp, Aspercreme for pain relief, and KVa Power Meter.

== Career ==
Sperti graduated from the University of Cincinnati in 1923. Shortly afterwards he was named Director of its Research Laboratory. His invention of an ultraviolet lamp to irradiate milk and add Vitamin D without changing the flavor was sold to General Foods for US$300,000. Sperti donated the entire amount to the University to continue basic research, and went on to develop a successful business line of ultraviolet sunlamps.

He also invented the first practical technique for freeze-drying orange juice concentrate. He donated most of the money he received from 127 patents to the University of Cincinnati and the Institutum Divi Thomae, which he co-founded in 1935 in collaboration with the Archdiocese of Cincinnati, with the purpose of researching cancer. A cell derivative believed to stimulate healthy cell growth was discovered at the school by Stanley L. Baker, Ph.D., and was originally tested on burn victims. An accidental application of it resulted in a huge market as Preparation H. The primary active ingredient in his invention was a compound containing a live yeast cell derivative (LYCD), which Sperti named Bio-Dyne. The Food and Drug Administration later discovered clinical testing irregularities in the use of LYCD, and it was removed from the formulation sold in the United States. There are stories that the original Preparation H was used to treat burns. The Canadian and European versions of Preparation H still contain the ingredient.

== Honors ==
In 1936 Pope Pius XI made Sperti a member of the Pontifical Academy of Sciences. He received the Order of the Star of Italian Solidarity in 1956.

== Personal life ==
His sister, Mildred, was his assistant until she died in 1987. Neither sibling ever married and they lived together.

== Legacy ==
Sperti later renamed the Institutum as the St. Thomas Institute for Advanced Studies. It closed in 1988 when he became ill and the institute had financial difficulties.

== See also ==
- Health effects of sun exposure
