= Miriam Michael Stimson =

American chemist

Miriam Michael Stimson, OP (born Marian Emma Stimson, December 24, 1913 – June 15, 2002 in Chicago) was a member of the Adrian Dominican Sisters and a chemist. She was the second woman to lecture at the Sorbonne and taught at Siena Heights University. She is noted for her work on spectroscopy, and played a role in the history of understanding DNA.

== Early life ==
Stimson grew up in a Catholic family of English and Irish descent, the third child of Mary Holland and Frank Stimson. Throughout childhood, Stimson's family encountered several illnesses. Her older brother had polio, and her younger sister contracted a bacterial infection that affected her heart. Complications from the birth of twins left her mother with high blood pressure that affected her memory. Stimson helped raise her younger siblings, and taught her younger sister how to read. This experience shaped her personality as an educator.

== Education and career ==
Stimson's family was Catholic. Her parents encouraged her siblings and her to learn about their religion; Stimson took an interest in science early on. Frank and Mary Stimson supported their children in their desire for education. When Stimson reached the age of fourteen, her parents sent her to St. Joseph College and Academy, a Catholic academy in Adrian, Michigan, run by the Adrian Dominican Sisters. She worked on "wound-healing hormones" and helped to create a new hemorrhoid cream (preparation H)" before studying DNA bases and structure.

After graduating, she worked at St. Joseph College. She joined the Adrian Dominican Sisters and completed her education at Siena Heights College. Later she taught at Siena Heights College in Adrian and attended graduate school at the Institutum Divi Thomae.

Stimson taught chemistry at Siena Heights University and served as an academic advisor.

== Structure of DNA ==
There is a book for Dr. Jun Tsuji under the title The soul of DNA is the story of Sister Miriam Stimson and her knowledge about DNA and double helix, and she illustrated the structure of DNA in an easy-to-understand way. She also explained the relationship between cells and chemical instructions.

Sister Miriam's developed the 'KBr (potassium bromide) disk technique in which she mixed samples with KBr and compressed it into a little disk. Potassium bromide was a reasonable substance that would not interfere with the infrared light, and furthermore, it is ready to meld effectively with the example. Sister Miriam's technique was demonstrated to be superior to the previously-used oil method in a number of ways; "there was an absence of interfering bands, lower scattering losses, higher resolution of spectra, better control of concentration and homogeneity of sample, ease in examining small samples, and possibility of storing of specimens for further studies". This sort of method would have the capacity to accomplish a more exact spectrum of the compounds inside a substance and their position, which would alter infrared spectroscopy for quite a while, and furthermore affirm the Watson - Crick Model of the double helix for DNA. Because of her discoveries, Sister Miriam added to one of the best discoveries in her century, and in this way facilitated examinations including DNA structure and cancer, giving different researchers a more precise view on how DNA framed and worked.
