= Who Made Huckabee? =

Mock feud among Colbert, O'Brien and Stewart

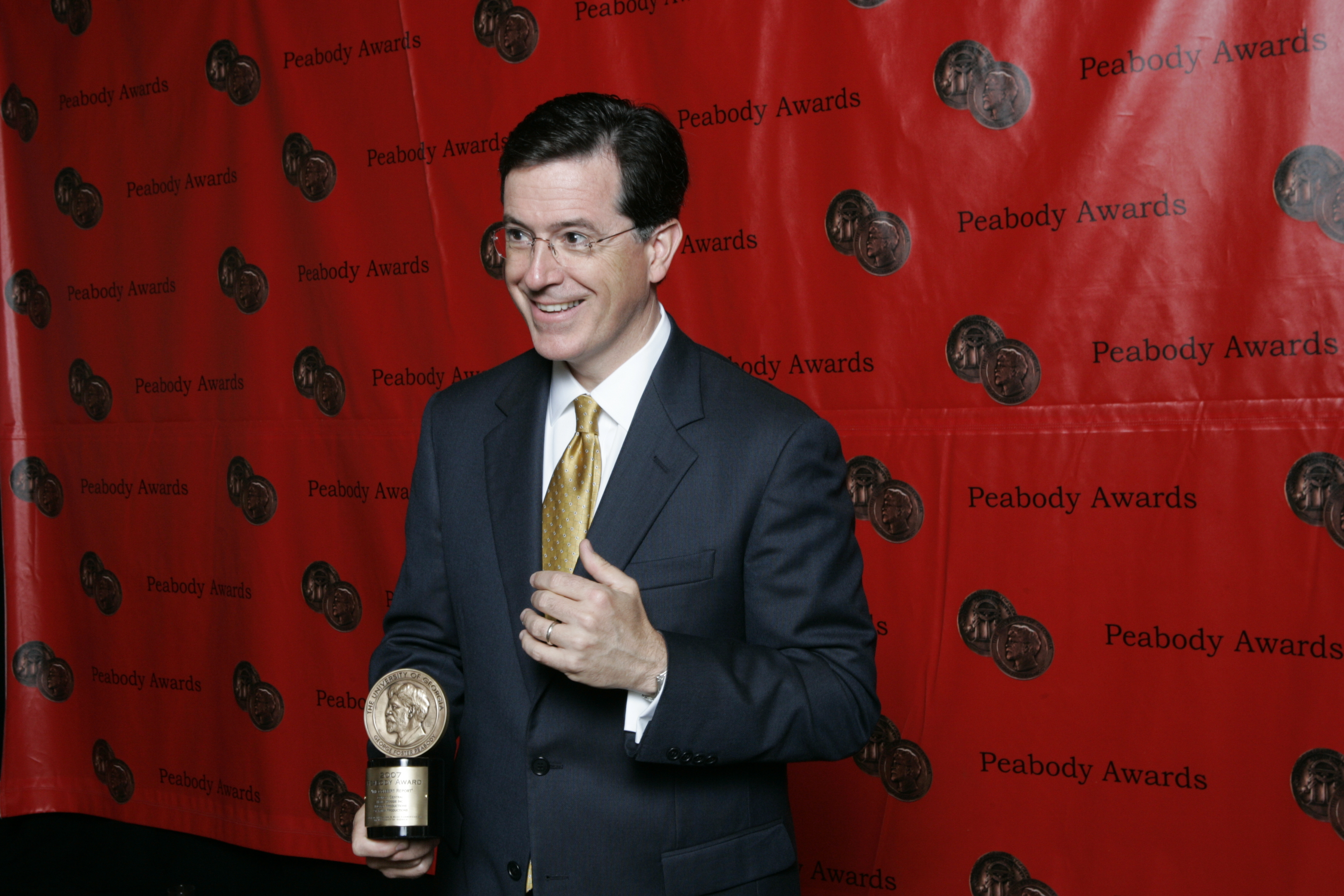
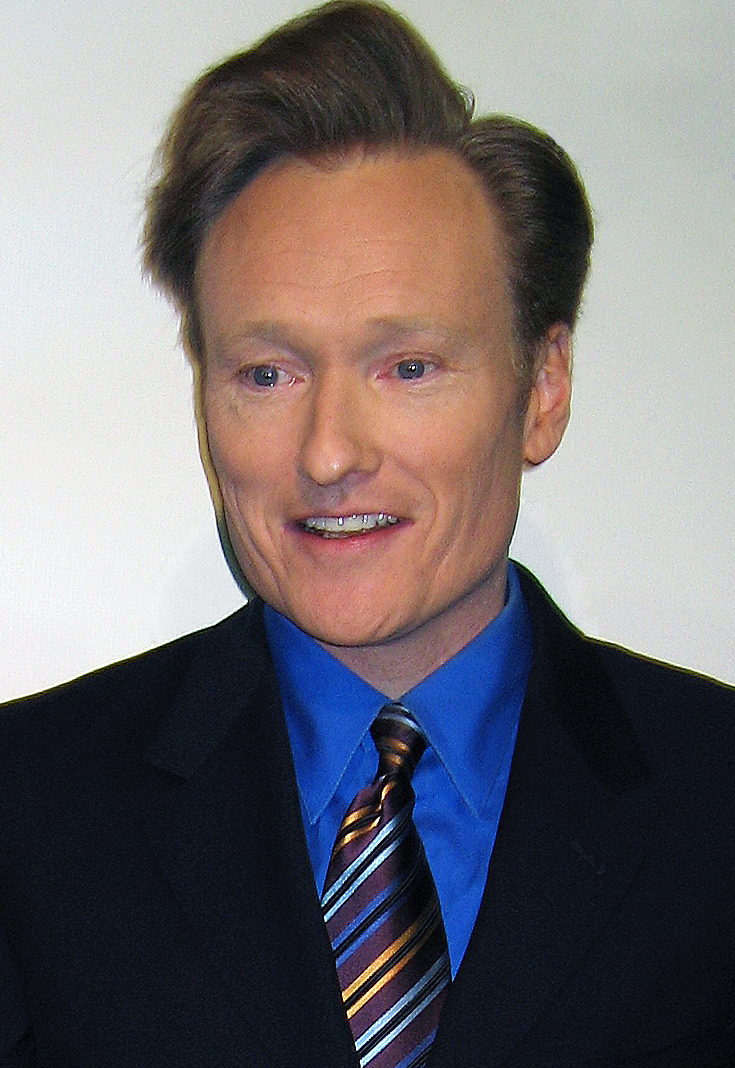
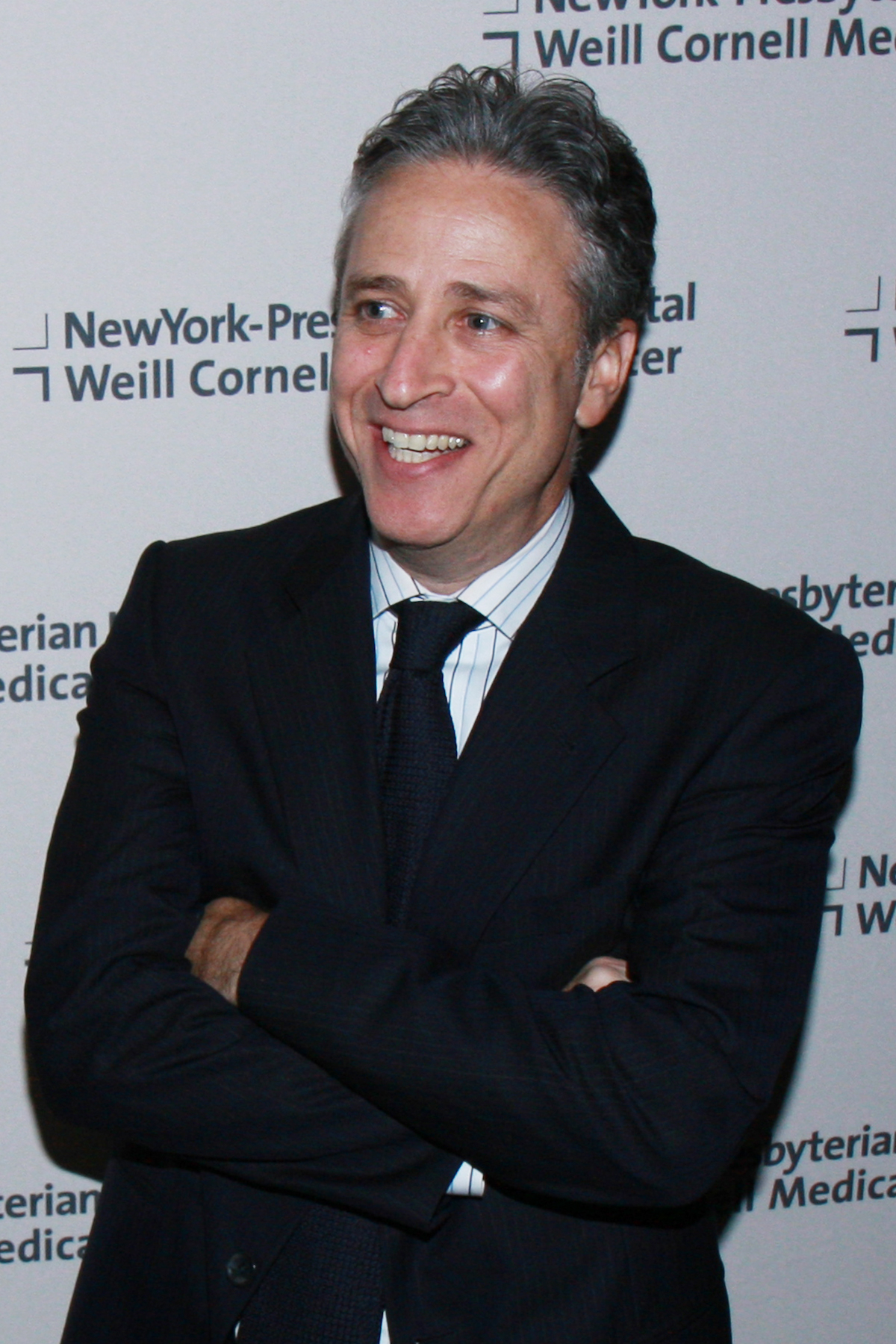
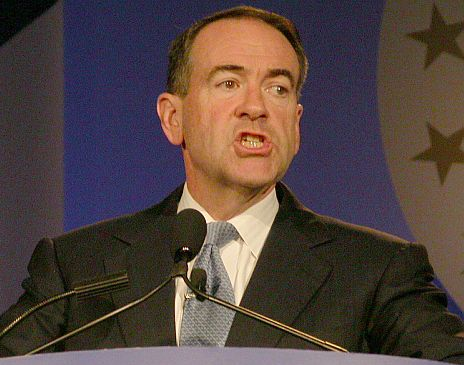
Colbert (top left), O'Brien (top right), and Stewart (bottom left) had an ongoing comical feud over who was responsible for Huckabee's (bottom right) surge in polls.

Who Made Huckabee?, also known as the Colbert/O'Brien/Stewart feud, refers to a mock rivalry that occurred among late night talk show hosts Stephen Colbert, Conan O'Brien and Jon Stewart in early 2008, reportedly over who was responsible for then–presidential candidate Mike Huckabee's success in the presidential primaries.

In reality, however, the feud was concocted by the three comedians as a result of the 2007–08 Writers Guild of America strike. Without writers to fuel their banter, the three comedians staged a crossover/rivalry in order to fill airtime and garner more viewers during the ratings slump. Colbert made the claim that because of "the Colbert bump" in popularity which results from guest appearances on his show, he was responsible for recurring guest Huckabee's success in the 2008 Iowa caucus. O'Brien claimed he was responsible for cable personality Colbert's success because he mentioned Colbert on Late Night with Conan O'Brien, a broadcast network show, and by extension was behind the success of Huckabee. In response, Stewart claimed he was responsible for O'Brien's original success, since Stewart featured him on The Jon Stewart Show in the early 1990s.

As the feud escalated, O'Brien, Colbert and Stewart each put forward increasingly farcical reasons he was responsible for Huckabee's success, insulting their rivals in the process. This resulted in a three-part comedic battle between the three faux-pundits, with all three appearing on each other's shows on the same night. The feud ended on Late Night with Conan O'Brien with a tongue-in-cheek "all-out brawl" between the three talk-show hosts.

Reaction to the "feud" by both the public and the media was mostly positive. TV Squad's Annie Wu wrote: "With the three hosts appearing on each other's shows all on one night, it was special appearances galore. It became a clash of the Titans, a battle of epic proportions, a heaping helping of Monday fanservice." Even so, the three comedians "shared a certain comedic sensibility", and admitted that they had a good time while helping each other out. O'Brien said: "It certainly helped that all three of us [were] in a period of our careers where we're looking for content."

== The feud ==
=== Beginning ===
The 2007–2008 Writers Guild of America (WGA) strike, which began in November 2007, strongly affected the United States' entertainment industry. Virtually all scripted Hollywood shows were expected to shut down by the week of December 19, 2007. Hollywood journalist Nikki Finke reported, "CEOs are determined to write off not just the rest of this TV season (including the Back 9 of scripted series), but also pilot season and the 2008/2009 schedule as well. Indeed, network orders for reality TV shows are pouring into the agencies right now."

Of the "Big Four" networks—CBS, ABC, NBC and Fox—NBC had the most severe ad shortfall as its prime time ratings declined sharply; none of its new shows achieved breakout success. Moreover, during 2007, NBC saw its prime time 18-to-49-year-old viewership drop by 11%, CBS dropped the same demographic by 10%, and ABC lost 5%.

Although he is a WGA member who pledged support for the writers, O'Brien announced that following the collapse of negotiations, Late Night with Conan O'Brien would return to air on January 2, 2008, without writers, citing his non-writing staff facing layoffs as the main reason. Later, Stewart and Colbert announced that their shows, The Daily Show and The Colbert Report, would also return without writers on January 7, 2008. To show respect to the picketing writers, The Daily Show was renamed, for the duration of the strike, A Daily Show with Jon Stewart. Similarly, The Colbert Report was rebranded as The Colbert Report (with hard T's) for its first new episode since the strike began. On January 2, 2008, Late Night featured a small musical segment at the beginning of the show detailing O'Brien's newly grown beard in a similar show of support for the striking writers.

Huckabee generated a considerable following of young voters during his campaign, primarily because of his support of the Fair Tax as well as his concerns about global warming, education, and several other issues typically not referred to by Republicans. Most notable is the following Huckabee gathered among the younger crowd via the internet. Huck's Army, an online grassroots coalition and volunteer think tank, is largely composed of younger, more technologically savvy adherents. So productive was this group that it received national media attention and was credited by Huckabee as "the secret weapon of our campaign".

On January 4, 2008, O'Brien attempted to take responsibility for Huckabee's popularity among young voters by claiming that his show was the sole cause of Huckabee's status in the votes, due to his use of "The Walker, Texas Ranger Lever", which increased the popularity of actor and public Huckabee supporter Chuck Norris. O'Brien reasoned that the popularity of Norris, fueled by the Late Night sketch, translated into support for Huckabee. Colbert later lashed out at O'Brien on his own show on January 16, 2008, claiming that he himself was responsible for Huckabee's success in the Iowa caucus thanks to his giving Huckabee "the Colbert bump," a rise in popularity following an appearance on The Colbert Report. The exasperated Colbert ended his rant with this "threat" against O'Brien:

So back off of Mike Huckabee, or I will kick your 'translucent white ass! You got that, Irish?

During the January 17, 2008, episode of Late Night, O'Brien, in what he later described as "a heated moment", called Colbert the "temporary host of The Colbert Report." O'Brien also refused to recant his statement concerning Huckabee, claiming that, just by mentioning Colbert on his network show, he was, in turn, "breathing life" into Colbert's "basic cable" career. Therefore, according to his logic, "if Colbert made Huckabee, and Conan made Colbert, then Conan made Huckabee!"

In response, during the January 29, 2008, episode of The Colbert Report, Colbert, persuaded by "the soundness of [O'Brien's] logic", was prepared to concede. Before he could, however, Jon Stewart, Colbert's former Daily Show colleague, appeared on the set and cautioned Colbert against doing so. Stewart exhibited a vintage VHS tape, which contained footage of him introducing O'Brien on Stewart's earlier MTV program, The Jon Stewart Show, in 1994. Therefore, by his own logic:

Colbert made Huckabee ... Conan made Colbert ... Jon Stewart made Conan ... Jon Stewart made Huckabee!

Colbert accepted this, as it kept Huckabee's 'creation' "in the family." Stewart then jokingly said it was up to O'Brien to respond, so that the three of them could "figure out a way to settle the matter that wastes time on all three of [their] shows"—an obvious allusion to the writers' strike and the need to generate new material without said writers. Colbert ended the segment with the crack, "Ball's in your court, Conan!"

=== Escalation ===
Upon learning of Stewart's involvement in the feud, O'Brien used his February 1, 2008, episode to show a modified photo of himself as a doctor delivering both Colbert and Stewart as babies, after which he proceeded to make fun of their genitalia. O'Brien continued the earlier chain of reasoning by arguing that by delivering Stewart and Colbert to the world, he deserved credit for any of their potential accomplishments, including Huckabee. O'Brien then made the following statement:

I think this ends the feud. But this is my warning—and this is not a threat, this is a promise! If either Stewart or Colbert mentions this again in any way, I am going over to their tiny little studio, and I am kicking some Comedy Central ass!

This resulted in a three-part comedic battle between the three faux-pundits, with all three appearing on each other's shows on February 4, 2008. It all began on the set of The Daily Show, when Colbert, to thunderous applause, interrupted the middle of a seemingly normal show to thank Stewart for settling the feud. Stewart at first responded happily to this, but then grew visibly frightened once Colbert informed him of O'Brien's response from a few days before. Colbert then began taunting O'Brien, calling him "cheap", "stupid" and "lazy"—much to Stewart's chagrin, who begged Colbert to stop. It was too late, however, as O'Brien, accompanied by thunderous applause, quickly walked in and furiously scolded the two for keeping the feud going. A seething Colbert, nonetheless, refused to back down, and even snarled at O'Brien: "You want to tangle, Red?" O'Brien agreed, but as the two prepared to take the fight outside, Stewart reminded them that he had to finish his show. O'Brien and Colbert agreed to wait outside, where they engaged in idle chit chat.

When Stewart finished, he went into the hall to find Colbert was gone to tape his show. On the set of The Colbert Report, Colbert was discussing John McCain's rise in the polls, and joked that since the media had said that "a vote for Mike Huckabee is a vote for McCain", and Colbert was Huckabee's "running mate," then Colbert, "by the transitive property of Huckabee", was really McCain. He was soon interrupted by Stewart and O'Brien, who had just left the set of The Daily Show to continue their fight. Stewart jokingly claimed that, since he had "made" both Colbert and O'Brien, Stewart himself was McCain—clearly provoking O'Brien. After some playful attacks, Colbert persuaded the two to wait outside until he finished taping his show.

But of course, by the time Colbert had finished, O'Brien had gone off to tape his show. Too impatient, Colbert and Stewart then decided to walk across the hall and finally end the fight on O'Brien's set. However, the door supposedly leading to O'Brien's set was locked, leaving Colbert and Stewart no other choice but to use forced entry—via a bobby pin. A later interview with O'Brien revealed further information of how Stewart and Colbert were able to slip through security:

[I]t's not that hard getting in the building, even though I probably shouldn't say that. They made crude NBC passes out of clay and just walked right through. . .They said they were from the network affiliate in Ohio.

=== Ending ===
On the final part of the battle on February 4, 2008, after O'Brien's monologue concerning his "feud" with Colbert and Stewart, the two strutted West Side Story-Kick the Moon styles onto the set, accompanied by thunderous applause, and pulled O'Brien backstage. Colbert, O'Brien and Stewart then proceeded to fight it out to the tune of "Brianstorm", a song by the English alternative rock band Arctic Monkeys. The hosts engaged in one fight scene cliche after the other, from slow motion punches to falling into cardboard boxes to rolling down a flight of stairs. What followed was "four punishing, uninterrupted minutes of Louisville Slugger bludgeonings, the gruesome torching of pasty comedian flesh, and a near-beheading by the razor-sharp blades of a pair of hockey skates". The battle concluded with a three-way simultaneous freeze-frame punch that parodied the ending of Rocky III, when the scene dissolved into a watercolor painting. Huckabee himself made an appearance and declared:

Let's be clear: None of these guys made me. This great nation made me. So vote for me. God bless America... and forget these three idiots.

As he finished, a wrestling bell sounded and the image of Huckabee morphed into yet another Rocky III-style painting, marking the end of the feud.

== Aftermath ==
That same day, Colbert and Stewart issued the following joint statement:

Conan's claims on Mike Huckabee could not go unanswered. We just hope the kids out there learned that sometimes the best way to resolve a conflict is with violence.

Meanwhile, as O'Brien was recovering, he conducted an interview with the Associated Press, and explained that one of the reasons he took part in the feud was because, "[Colbert] had been leaving me threatening messages. He got to me. I have a temper. A famous temper."

Later that same day, on The Daily Show, Stewart poked fun at the fight by calling it "the stupidest fucking thing anyone's ever seen." He then apologized to Colbert, in a conversation via satellite, for inadvertently smashing him over the head with a beer bottle during the brawl, amid the confusion. While Colbert accepted his apology, Stewart continued and asked why Colbert had initially responded by shoving a recycling bin over Stewart's head and hitting him with a baseball bat. To which Colbert replied, "No, no, Jon—I shoved a recycling bin over your head and encouraged Conan to hit you with a baseball bat," and, as usual, left Stewart confused. At the end of the segment, Stewart asked Colbert: "Did we win that [fight]?" Colbert's answer was, "I think America won, Jon."

In the meantime, Huckabee won the first contest of "Super Tuesday" with 52% of the West Virginia GOP state convention electorate to rival Mitt Romney's 47%. Backers of rival John McCain threw him their support to prevent Mitt Romney from capturing the winner-take-all GOP state convention vote. He also secured victories in Alabama, Arkansas, Georgia and Tennessee on Super Tuesday, bringing his delegate count up to 156, a distant third compared to 689 for Republican Party front-runner McCain and Romney's 286, according to the 2008 Republican presidential primaries and caucuses.

On February 7, 2008, Huckabee made a trip to New York to make yet another appearance on The Colbert Report, declaring he was still a viable candidate in the race. By the end of the segment, he was playing a game of air hockey with the host.

However, despite winning the Kansas Republican Caucuses and the Louisiana Republican Primary, Huckabee decided to end his bid for the GOP nomination, upon losing the Texas Republican Primary on March 4, 2008.

=== Reception ===
Reaction to the "feud" by both the public and the media was nearly uniformly positive. Clips from the feud quickly became popular on the Internet, turning into viral videos that spread across numerous blogs in various forms, with the sites that offered the videos seeing vast increases in their traffic. TV Squad's Annie Wu beamed: "With the three hosts appearing on each other's shows all on one night, it was special appearances galore. It became a clash of the Titans, a battle of epic proportions, a heaping helping of Monday fanservice."

Interestingly, upon returning to air on January 7, 2008, The Daily Show and The Colbert Report had increased ratings. As of the end of January 2008, The Daily Show was up 17 percent for viewers between 18 and 34 from January 2007 and up nine percent for 18- to 49-year-olds in the same period. The Colbert Report was up 21 percent for 18- to 34-year-olds and 15 percent for 18- to 49-year-olds over the same time period. Late Night with Conan O'Brien, however, remained at a normal level, with 2.5 million viewers. One reason given for the increase in Daily Show and Colbert Report ratings was the current presidential election, allowing them a large amount of political humor to use. However, one journalist commented that the raise of ratings in these two shows without the writers "has to be a big PR setback for the WGA."

In fact, not long after the "Who Made Huckabee?" feud culminated, the writers' strike officially ended on February 13, 2008, with the writers returning to work the following day, at which point the titles of The Daily Show and The Colbert Report were restored.

=== Ironic subtext ===
In contrast to the strained relationship depicted on-camera among Colbert, O'Brien and Stewart, the three are actually good friends and admire each other's shows. O'Brien admitted that, "the three of us have come along in the same comedic environment," and that, while "our shows all probably have their distinct flavor, [ ... ] this happened because the three of us knew we would like doing this with each other." The Associated Press noted:

For anyone watching, it was clear the three hosts share a certain comedic sensibility. Such playfulness would seem impossible with other late-night talk-show hosts; CBS' David Letterman and NBC's Jay Leno, for instance, have long had icy relations.

This from TV Squad's Annie Wu:

I would also like to note that even those that haven't found this fake feud particularly amusing must find a bit of sweetness in it. After all, these are hosts that have constantly expressed how lost they feel without their writers. There's something wonderful in seeing three comedians doing each other a favor by creating some silly material and taking it this far, just to help fill time. This one dumb fight alone has taken up so many episodes. Bless their little late night hearts for helping each other out.

"My favorite comedy is comedy where nothing is achieved and there is no point," O'Brien said. "That this whole Huckabee fight turned into an insane Marx Brothers dance was fitting somehow [ ... ] The fight itself is three people with a box full of props playing for about an hour."

== See also ==
- Effect of the 2007–08 Writers Guild of America strike on television
- List of Late Night with Conan O'Brien sketches
- Mike Huckabee 2008 presidential campaign
