= St. Joseph Academy (Adrian, Michigan) =

Coordinates: 41°54′16″N 84°00′45″W

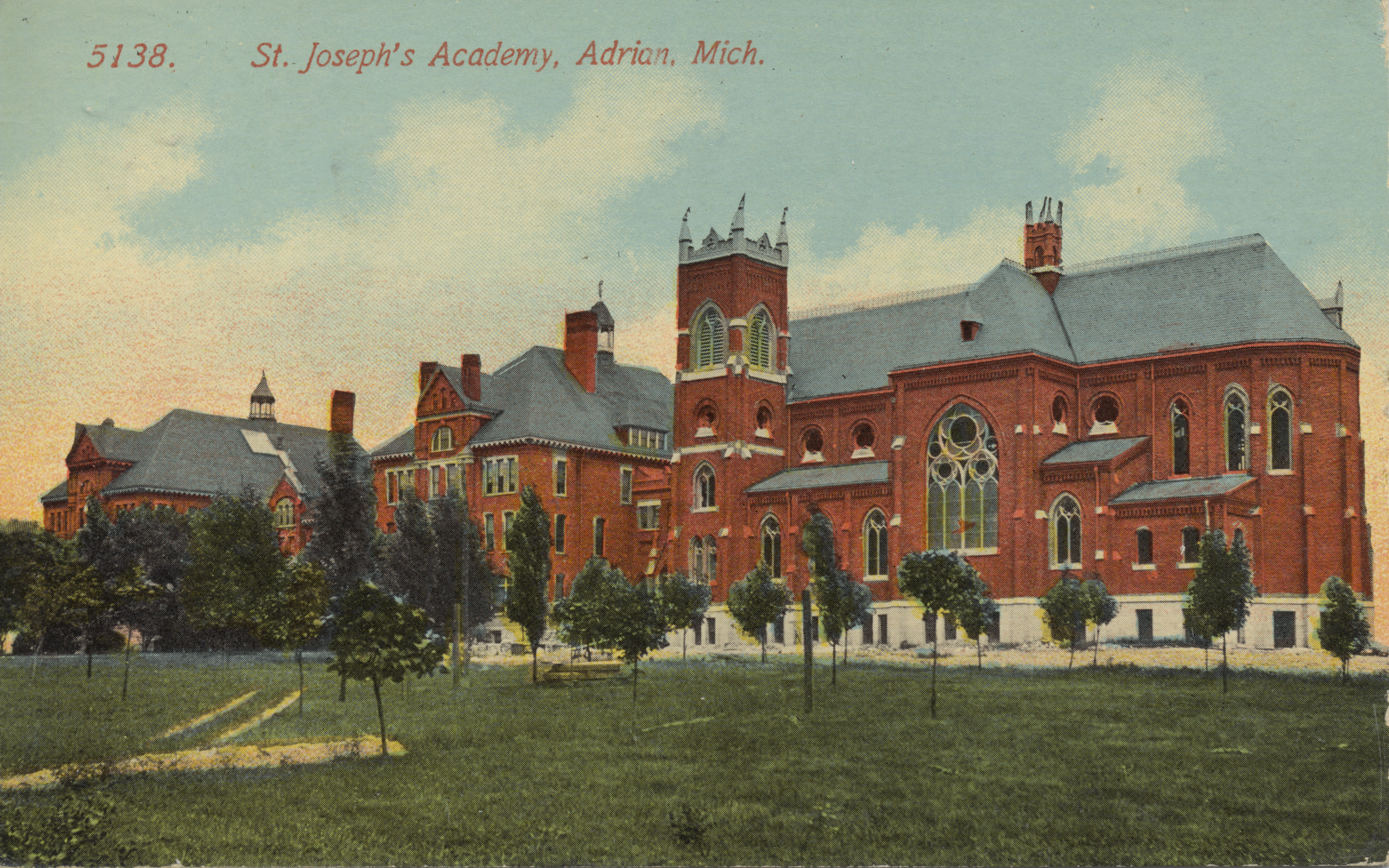
Postcard of St. Joseph's Academy, c. 1914.

St. Joseph Academy, previously St. Joseph's College and Academy, was a Catholic girls' school in Adrian, Michigan, operating from 1896 to 2012. Established by Catholic nuns in a building that had previously operated as a hospital, the school operated as a high school and elementary school for most of its existence; the high school component closed in 1975.

== Establishment and early years ==
The school was established by Mother Camilla Madden, founder of the Adrian Dominican Sisters, on September 8, 1896, "to provide education to girls from families of moderate or poor financial circumstances". The order had previously operated a private hospital, but both income and membership dwindled as public hospitals became more prevalent, leading to the decision to establish a school. As early as 1892, plans were made to renovate a nearby house called Elm House for the remaining long-term hospital residents, but the Bishop of Detroit, John Samuel Foley, initially rejected the proposal to establish a school, asserting that the educational needs of the region were already met by the existing Saint Mary Academy in Monroe, Michigan, which later became part of St. Mary Catholic Central High School. After rejecting the proposed new school several more times, Foley finally relented to a provisional effort after visiting Adrian to preside over the induction of new sisters on November 18, 1895. The order then set about obtaining certification for the sisters to become teachers, and placed the first advertisement for the new school in the Michigan Catholic. Tuition was initially $2.50 per week. A priest of the diocese, James O'Reilly, D.D., who has assisted with building community support for the institution, was appointed as its first director.

Initially housed at the Motherhouse of the Dominican Sisters, which was converted from its previous use as a hospital to house the school and dormitory, the school received only six students on its first day of classes, far fewer than the fifteen nuns certified as teachers. However, more students enrolled over the next several weeks, and the prospects for the success of the school brightened. The school used its initial low enrollment to its advantage, publicizing the amount of attention that could be devoted to each student, given the ratio of teachers to students. Enrollment doubled to 30 students in 1897, and to 60 students in 1898, with the first commencement ceremony being held for graduates in 1899. After this, students came in increasing numbers to this boarding school and the ecumenical province grew rapidly with new members. The school quickly expanded and gained a good reputation, with a priest who evaluated the school in 1899 stating that "[n]o better institution for girls will be found in the state", and a reporter describing it as "in the front ranks of educational institutions of its character in the West". Increasing enrollment necessitated the addition of a new wing to the building, including an auditorium, which was completed in 1902. By 1906, enrollment had reached 200 students.

The school succeeded in both reviving the solvency of the order, and providing an influx of new members, with a proportion of students choosing to join as nuns.

== Later developments ==
By the 1920s the school had an enrollment of over 500 students, including "students from virtually every state in the union". The teachers and alumni played a substantial role in defeating a 1920 Michigan ballot initiative that would have required students to attend public schools, which would have eliminated St. Joseph Academy and other parochial schools. In 1919, St. Joseph's College had been established in the same building, and authorized to award bachelor's degrees. It operated there until a new building was completed on the campus for it in 1922. Eventually, the operation of the academy and the college under the same name led to confusion, leading to the college being renamed Siena Heights in 1939. A new building was constructed for St. Joseph Academy in 1948. A Montessori school opened at the Academy in 1971, while the high school component of the school closed in 1975. The Adrian Dominican Montessori Teacher Education Institute remained in operation after the closure of the Academy in 2012. In 2016, the Adrian Dominican Sisters gifted the Academy's building to Siena Heights University, which had also been established by the Sisters.

Chemist Miriam Michael Stimson was a noted alumnus of the school who remained as a member of the order, and later taught at Siena Heights University.
