= Audience riser =

Elevated platforms in theaters, classrooms, or other venues

Audience risers are elevated platforms for people in a theater, classroom, or other venue.

The origin of the audience riser can be dated back to original amphitheaters, such as the Colosseum.

Audience risers are different from bleachers in that the seats for bleachers are integrated into the structure itself; audience risers are primarily platforms first, to which a variety of chairs, tables, cameras, spot lights, etc. may be used on. While bleachers provide fixed aisle ways and may not provide a solid floor, audience risers are designed so that each level presents a flat, unbroken surface.

== Configurations ==
Audience risers may be configured to hold convention seating, theater seating, classroom table seating or dinner table seating. Although primarily rectangular in overall shape, audience risers may include angled or curved sections as space allows.

The lighting and configuration must match. For a "lecture-performance", any "light is equally distributed in the audience risers and the stage." In lighting design, one must remember to work around any visual obstructions.

One drama textbook recommends against a gap before traditional theater risers, which is similar to a 'classroom riser': "The optimal performance space for real-time acting is a flat or level-floor theater, one in which the audience risers begin on the same level as the acting space, permitting no separation between actor and audience."(italics in original)

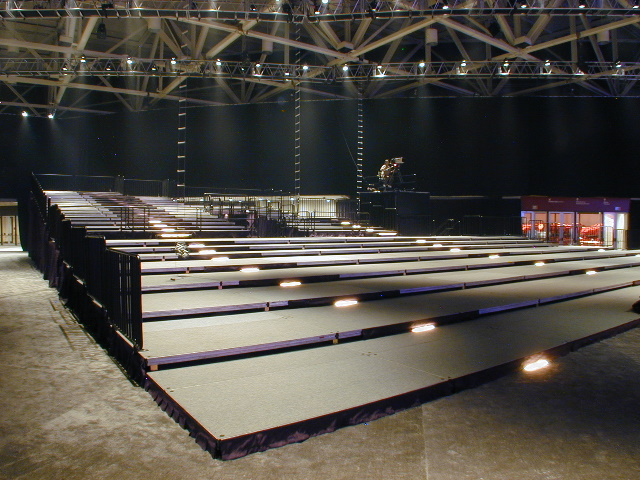
Audience Riser

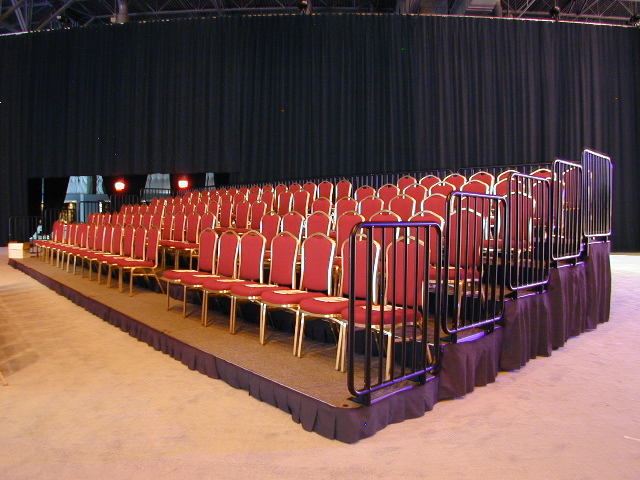
Traditional Theater Riser

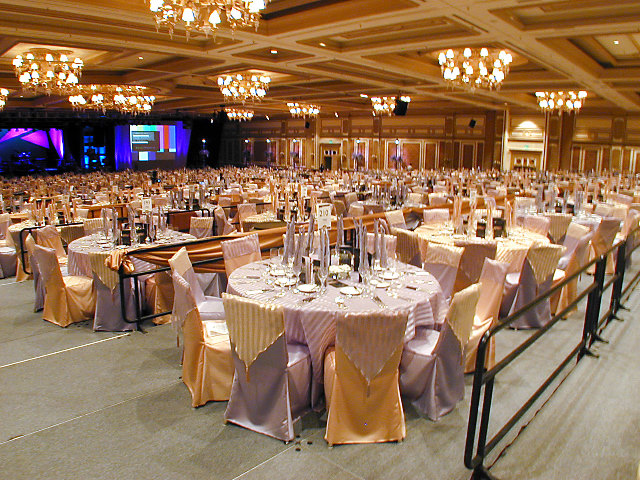
Dinner Riser

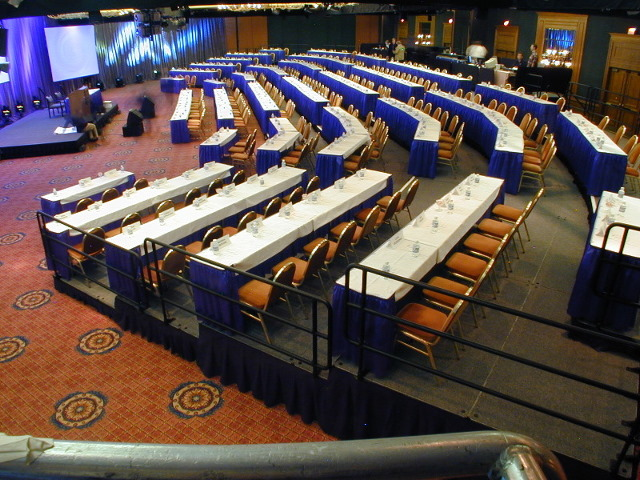
Classroom Riser, also known as a flat or level-floor riser

== Construction ==
Audience risers may be temporary (purpose-built) or a permanent part of a facility. They may be commercially built, or designed and crafted by the theater staff. Audience risers are primarily constructed using stage decks, although construction with lumber and framing, or plywood, are not uncommon.

== See also ==
- Bleacher
- Dormitory
- Step and repeat
