= Preparation H =

Medication for treating hemorrhoids

Preparation H is an American brand of medications that is made by Pfizer, used in the treatment of hemorrhoids. Hemorrhoids are caused at least in part by inflamed blood vessels, and most versions of Preparation H work by reducing inflammation in blood vessels.

The company that makes this product incorporated in 1926 as American Home Products (AHP) and "one of AHP's earliest prizes was the acquisition of a sunburn oil in 1935 that the company transformed into Preparation H, which became one of the world's best-selling hemorrhoid treatments." AHP changed its name to Wyeth in 2002, and was then bought by Pfizer in 2009, which was reported to have paid $68 billion.

== Formulations ==
Several formulations have been produced. Some are in a water-based gel while others are petroleum jelly-based, and the suppositories use a base of cocoa butter. It also comes as a medicated wipe. The active ingredients range from simple caffeine moisturizers with witch-hazel astringent to preparations containing drugs such as phenylephrine, pramoxine, and hydrocortisone. Formulations vary from one country to another. Some Preparation H products have phenylephrine, a drug that constricts blood vessels, in a 0.25% concentration, as well as shark liver oil. Another version of Preparation H has hydrocortisone as its only active ingredient in a 1% concentration.

The Canadian formulation of Preparation H includes a yeast extract called Biodyne which was removed in 1995 from the formulation sold in the United States. This yeast extract was the primary ingredient of the original formulation by inventor George Sperti, and Pfizer believes that it removes wrinkles from skin and heals dry, cracked, and irritated skin. In Greece, the active ingredients of Preparation H are 1% w/w yeast extract and 3% w/w shark liver oil.
