= Late Night (franchise) =

American late-night talk show franchise

- The logo for Late Night with Seth Meyers, the current iteration of the Late Night franchise.
- Genre: Talk show Variety show
- Created by: David Letterman
- Presented by: David Letterman; Conan O'Brien; Jimmy Fallon; Seth Meyers
- Country of origin: United States
- No. of episodes: 1,819 (under Letterman); 2,725 (under O'Brien); 969 (under Fallon); 1,850 (under Meyers); Total: 7,327

Production
- Camera setup: Multi-camera
- Running time: Varies
- Production companies: Carson Productions (1982–1993); Worldwide Pants (1991–1993); Broadway Video (since 1993); Conaco (2001–2009); Sethmaker Shoemeyers Productions (since 2014); NBC Productions (1982–1996); NBC Studios (1996–2004); NBC Universal Television Studio (2004–2007); Universal Media Studios (2007–2011); Universal Television (since 2011)

Original release
- Network: NBC
- Release: February 1, 1982 – present

Related
- The Tomorrow Show; The Tonight Show

Late Night is an American late-night talk and variety show airing on NBC since 1982. Late Night has had four hosts: David Letterman (1982–1993), Conan O'Brien (1993–2009), Jimmy Fallon (2009–2014) and Seth Meyers (since 2014). Each iteration of the show was built around its host, and maintained distinct identities aside from the title, time slot, and network. The longest-serving host to date was O'Brien, who hosted Late Night with Conan O'Brien for almost 16 years, from September 1993 to February 2009.

== Hosting history ==
Host	Start date	End date	Duration	Episodes
David Letterman	February 1, 1982	June 25, 1993	11 years, 144 days	1,819
Conan O'Brien	September 13, 1993	February 20, 2009	15 years, 160 days	2,725
Jimmy Fallon	March 2, 2009	February 7, 2014	4 years, 342 days	969
Seth Meyers	February 24, 2014	present	12 years, 258 days	1,850

== History ==
=== David Letterman ===
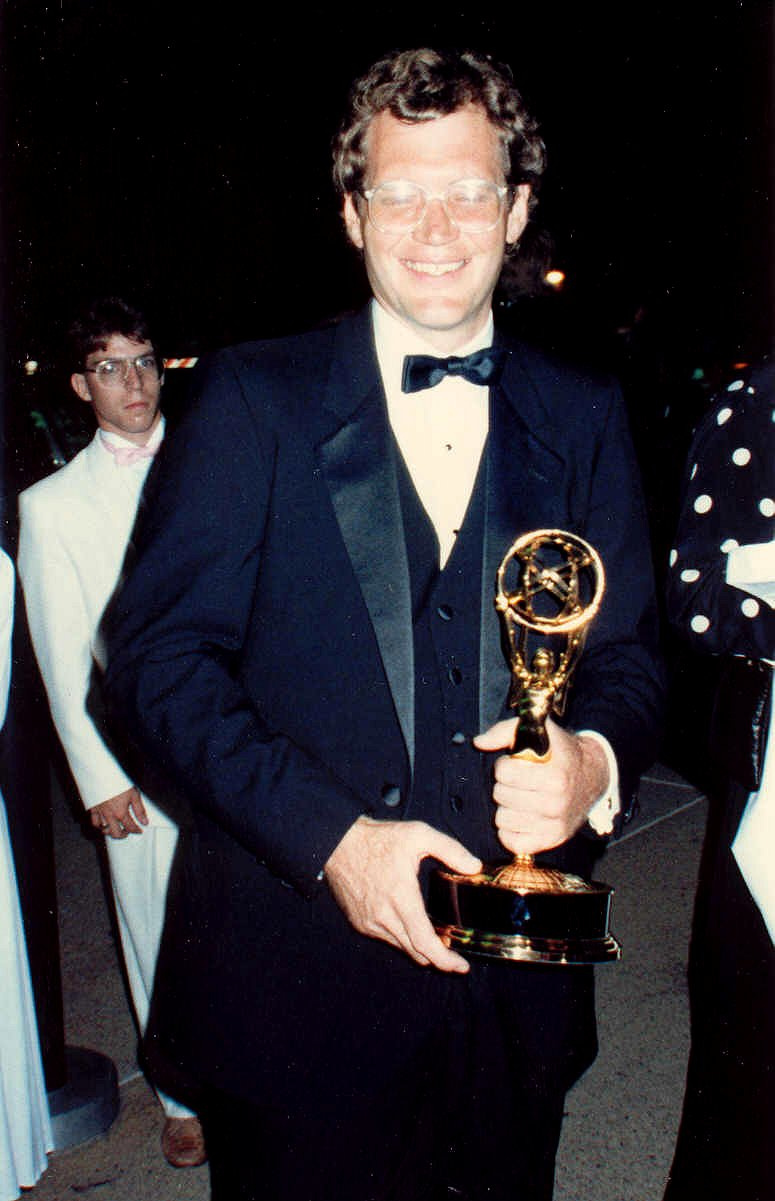
Letterman at the 1987 Emmy Awards

The show replaced The Tomorrow Show, hosted by Tom Snyder (and later co-hosted by Rona Barrett), on Mondays through Thursdays. It did not expand to Fridays until 1987, when Friday Night Videos was moved back an hour to accommodate a five-day-a-week Late Night.

Late Night originated from NBC's headquarters building at 30 Rockefeller Plaza in New York City, inheriting Studio 6A from Tomorrow (it was also the studio for Letterman's morning program in 1980). The program ran four nights a week, Monday to Thursday, from the show's premiere in February 1982 until May 1987. Friday shows were added in June 1987 (NBC previously aired Friday Night Videos in the 12:30 am slot with occasional Late Night specials and reruns). Starting in September 1991, The Tonight Show Starring Johnny Carson was pushed back from 11:30 pm to 11:35 p m, with Letterman starting at 12:35 am, at the request of NBC affiliates who wanted more advertising time for their profitable late newscasts.

In mid-1993, E! Entertainment Television purchased broadcast rights to Late Night. The network aired complete shows from various years five days per week from 1993 until 1996. Then Trio (owned by NBC) picked up reruns and showed them from 2002 until the channel went off the air in 2005. In 2022, David Letterman launched his official YouTube channel, which contains clips from this show and his previous morning and later Late Show programs.

A number of programs were sold by GoodTimes Entertainment in 1992–93. These episodes were stripped of the series theme, open and close. No DVD release is currently scheduled (GoodTimes went bankrupt in 2005).

A total of 1,819 shows were broadcast during its eleven and a half year run (an episode on January 16, 1991, went unaired due to pre-emption for coverage the beginning of the Gulf War; the program had already been shot before word came out of Baghdad that United States airstrikes were beginning).

Peter Ustinov was a guest on the one-shot "360-degree" episode, during which the show's image gradually rotated 360 degrees during the course of an hour.

==== Transition from Letterman to O'Brien ====
Upon Johnny Carson's unexpected retirement from The Tonight Show in 1992, executives at NBC announced that Carson's "permanent guest host" Jay Leno would take over Tonight, and not David Letterman. This was done against the wishes of Carson, who had always seen Letterman as his rightful successor, according to Worldwide Pants senior vice president Peter Lassally, a onetime producer for both men. NBC later claimed that Letterman's high ratings for Late Night was the reason it kept Letterman where he was. Letterman was bitterly disappointed and angry at not having been given The Tonight Show job, and, on Carson's advice, walked away from NBC after eleven years on Late Night. CBS signed Letterman to compete directly opposite Leno's Tonight Show at 11:35 PM. He moved his show over to CBS virtually unchanged, taking most of the staff, skits, and comedy formats with him. However, NBC owned the rights to the Late Night name and much of the intellectual property created for the show, forcing Letterman to rechristen his show as Late Show with David Letterman and re-title many of its signature comedy elements. ("Viewer Mail" became "CBS Mailbag"; sidekick Calvert DeForest was no longer called "Larry 'Bud' Melman", but instead used his real name, etc.) However, some recurring elements, notably "Stupid Pet Tricks", actually dated from Letterman's earlier morning show. Those elements were Letterman's property, not NBC's, and carried over to the new show completely unchanged.

NBC was faced with an unexpected need to replace not just Letterman, but Late Night itself. The network still owned the name, but needed to essentially build a new show from scratch. The show was first offered to Dana Carvey and Garry Shandling, both of whom turned it down.

Saturday Night Live producer Lorne Michaels' company, Broadway Video, replaced Carson Productions and Letterman's Worldwide Pants as the show's co-production company, in partnership with NBC Studios. Michaels took a leadership role in redeveloping the show, and comedians Jon Stewart, Drew Carey, and Paul Provenza all auditioned for the hosting role. Michaels suggested to O'Brien, an unknown writer for The Simpsons and former writer for Saturday Night Live, that he should audition for the job. Despite having "about 40 seconds" of television-performance experience as an occasional extra on Saturday Night Live sketches, O'Brien auditioned for the show on April 13, 1993. His guests were Jason Alexander and Mimi Rogers, and the audition took place on the set of The Tonight Show with Jay Leno. O'Brien was offered the show on April 26, 1993, and made his first meaningful television appearance later that day when Leno introduced him on Tonight.

=== Conan O'Brien ===
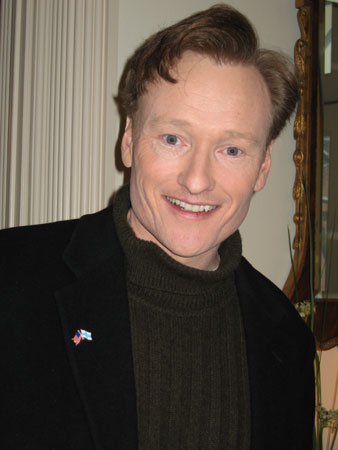
O'Brien in 2006

O'Brien's Late Night was rushed into production and debuted on September 13, 1993, with Andy Richter as O'Brien's sidekick. The premiere episode featured John Goodman (who received a "First Guest" medal for his appearance), Drew Barrymore, and Tony Randall. The episode featured a cold open of O'Brien's walk to the studio with constant reminders that he was expected to live up to Letterman, parodying a popular sentiment expressed in the media at the time. After seeming to be unaffected by the comments, O'Brien arrives at his dressing room and cheerfully prepares to hang himself. However, a warning that the show is about to start causes him to abandon his plans. The crowd for the first show mainly consisted of family members of the crew of the show so as to ensure a positive reception. The show remained in Studio 6A through O'Brien's tenure.

O'Brien's on-camera inexperience showed and the show's first fourteen weeks were generally considered mediocre. O'Brien, an unknown, was constantly at risk of being fired: NBC had him renewing short-term contracts, thirteen weeks at a time. He was reportedly on the brink of being fired at least once in this period, but NBC had no one to replace him. The show, and O'Brien, slowly improved through experience, and the show's ratings gradually increased to a level which allowed O'Brien to secure a longer contract, and not have to worry about cancellation.

On February 28, 1994, Letterman appeared on Late Night as O'Brien's only guest, marking Letterman's first appearance on an NBC talk show since his departure for CBS. During the interview, Letterman gave O'Brien positive reinforcement, telling him "there's nothing like this show anywhere on television" and that he was doing a terrific job as host. On May 20, 2015, during the opening monologue to his TBS talk show Conan aired just prior to the start of the final episode of Late Show with David Letterman marking Letterman's retirement as host, O'Brien directly credited Letterman's 1994 appearance with preventing Late Night from being cancelled by NBC.

In 2000, Richter left Late Night to pursue his acting career. The show's comedy bits and banter had usually depended on O'Brien's interaction with Richter. O'Brien's wacky non sequitur comedy became more pronounced as he played all of his comedy and commentary directly to the audience instead of towards Richter. Bandleader Max Weinberg also became O'Brien's primary sounding board and double act in Richter's absence.

Ratings and reviews continued to improve for Late Night, and in 2002, when time came to renew his contract, O'Brien had notable offers from other networks to defect. O'Brien decided to re-sign with NBC, however, joking that he initially wanted to make a 13-week deal (a nod to his first contract). He ultimately signed through 2005, indicating that it was symbolic of surpassing Letterman's run with 12 years of hosting.

In 2003, O'Brien's own production company, Conaco, was added as a producer of Late Night. The show celebrated its 10th anniversary, another milestone that O'Brien said he wanted to achieve with his 2002 contract. During the anniversary show, Mr. T handed O'Brien a chain with a large gold "7" on it.

O'Brien: "But Mr. T, we've been on the air for ten years!"
Mr. T: "I know that, fool, but you only been funny for seven!"

The show's house band was The Max Weinberg 7, led by E Street Band drummer Max Weinberg. The other six members were Mark Pender on trumpet, Richie "LaBamba" Rosenberg on trombone, Mike Merritt on bass, Jerry Vivino on saxophone and brother Jimmy Vivino on guitar, and Scott Healy on keyboard. James Wormworth served as backup drummer when Weinberg went on tour with Bruce Springsteen. With the departure of Andy Richter, Max Weinberg assumed a bigger role as an interlocutor for O'Brien's jokes. One common running gag was Max's awkwardness on camera and his apparent lack of chemistry with Conan. Weinberg was often used in sketches as well, which usually revolved around his purported sexual deviance (mostly a penchant for bedding barely legal groupies), although long running sketches also spoofed Max's lack of knowledge of current affairs.

Richie "LaBamba" Rosenberg was also used as the butt of many of Conan's jokes. These humorous sketches usually revolved around LaBamba's sizeable mustache, his poor acting skills, and his alleged inability to read sheet music. Mark Pender would often sing songs on the topic of a current event, which ended with him screeching uncontrollably and climbing the risers into the audience. All members of the 7 had successful side careers as studio musicians.

As is common in the talk show format, The Max Weinberg 7 performed the show's opening and closing themes, played bumpers into and out of commercial breaks (they actually played through the entire break for the studio audience), and a short piece during O'Brien's crossover to his desk after his monologue (except for several months beginning in April 2008, where a commercial break was inserted at that point). The show's opening theme was written by Howard Shore and John Lurie (a finalist for the job as bandleader). The show's closing theme was called "Cornell Knowledge", and was lifted from Jerry and Jimmy Vivino's first album together. However, on Late Night, it was played at a much quicker tempo than the album version.

The band played a wide variety of songs as bumpers – usually popular music from a variety of eras. Weinberg sometimes took extended leaves of absence to tour with Bruce Springsteen as the drummer for his E Street Band. During his absence, temporary replacement drummers were hired (most commonly James Wormworth), and the band was led by Jimmy Vivino ("Jimmy Vivino and the Max Weinberg 7").

Joel Godard, a long-time announcer for NBC shows, was the show's announcer and an occasional comedy contributor. These comedy bits usually revolved around Godard's supposed homosexual fetishes, deviant sexual habits, substance abuse, and suicidal tendencies. The humor came in part from Godard's delivery. No matter how depressing or deviant the topic being discussed he always did so in an exaggeratedly cheerful voice, and with a huge smile plastered on his face. Several sketches ended with Godard apparently committing suicide in his announcer's booth.

Members of the show's writing staff frequently appeared in sketches on the show. Among the most prolific were: Brian McCann (Preparation H Raymond, FedEx Pope, The Loser, Airsick Moth, Jerry Butters, Funhole Guy, Bulletproof Legs Guy, Adrian "Raisin" Foster, S&M Lincoln, etc.), Brian Stack (Hannigan the Traveling Salesman, Artie Kendall the Ghost Crooner, The Interrupter, Kilty McBagpipes, Fan-tastic Guy, Clive Clemmons, Frankenstein, Ira, Slipnut Brian, etc.), Jon Glaser (Segue Sam, Pubes, Awareness Del, Wrist Hulk, Ahole Ronald, Gorton's Fisherman, Jeremy, Slipnut Jon, etc.), Kevin Dorff (Coked-up Werewolf, Jesus Christ, Mansy the half-man/half-pansy, Joe's Bartender, Todd the Tiny Guy, etc.), and Andy Blitz (Awful Ballgame Chanter, Vin Diesel's brother Leonard Diesel, Slipnut Andy, Chuck Aloo aka the star of the 24 spin-off series 60). Blitz went so far as to travel to India for one bit in which he carried his computer through the streets of India to get technical support firsthand from the telephone representative at NBC's technical help center. One of the show's graphic designers, Pierre Bernard was featured several sketches, such as: "Pierre Bernard's Recliner of Rage", and "Nerding It Up For Pierre".

Late Night employed a number of sketch actors, many of whom were frequently reused in different roles in different episodes. Several years before joining the cast of Saturday Night Live, Amy Poehler often appeared as a regular in many sketches, she was best remembered for playing the role of Andy Richter's little sister, Stacy. Jack McBrayer frequently appeared as well. Triumph the Insult Comic Dog began as part of a sketch on Late Night. Celebrities such as Joyce Brothers, Nipsey Russell, Abe Vigoda and James Lipton also made frequent cameo appearances in comedy sketches on the show at different periods.

Unusual for a late-night talk show, Late Night made frequent use of various costumed characters such as The Masturbating Bear, Robot on a Toilet, and Pimpbot5000. The humor in these sketches often derived from the crude construction of the characters' costumes as well as the absurdist nature of their conceptions. For example, Pimpbot5000 was a 1950s-style robot who dressed and acted in the manner of an exaggerated blaxploitation pimp, while The Masturbating Bear was a man in a bear costume wearing an oversized diaper who would inevitably begin to fondle himself to the tune of Aram Khachaturian's "Sabre Dance" when brought on stage. Many of these characters did little more in their appearances than walk across the stage or be wheeled out from behind the curtain, but some had extensive sketches on the show.

As part of O'Brien's 2004 contract renegotiation with NBC, he was tapped to replace Jay Leno as host of The Tonight Show five years later, in the summer of 2009. O'Brien's last Late Night was taped and aired on February 20, 2009. He indeed succeeded Leno and renamed the show The Tonight Show with Conan O'Brien on June 1, 2009, and resigned as host just over seven months later, a result of the 2010 Tonight Show conflict.

O'Brien's last season on Late Night attracted an average of 1.98 million viewers, compared to 1.92 million viewers for The Late Late Show with Craig Ferguson.

On the final episode of his 16-year run, O'Brien stated that he "owed his career to Lorne Michaels".

=== Jimmy Fallon ===
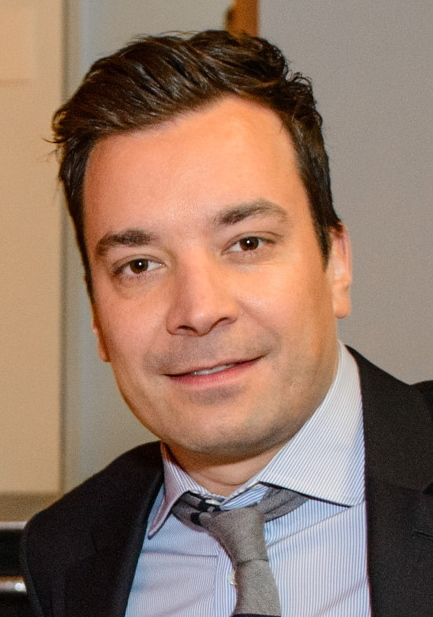
Fallon in 2013

Executive producer Lorne Michaels said he wanted Fallon to be the new host dating back to the day that Fallon left Saturday Night Live in 2004, which occurred only a few months before O'Brien's departure was announced. According to Michaels:

Jimmy's built for this kind of show. He's funny, he's charming, he's got a really good way of connecting with people. And he knows music, movies and TV really well, which is the backbone of these shows.

During the years between Fallon's SNL departure and the announcement that he would take over Late Night, Fallon concentrated on developing a feature film career, which Fallon himself said "really didn't work out that great."

Fallon was announced as O'Brien's replacement in May 2008; at the time of the announcement, he was scheduled to debut in June 2009. To help him prepare for his new Late Night host role, Michaels had Fallon perform comedy in clubs and create a series of webisodes. A behind-the-scenes vlog documenting preparations for the new show launched on December 8, 2008, with new episodes being posted weeknights at 12:30 am ET.

Fallon's house band was hip-hop band The Roots, and his announcer was Steve Higgins, a producer for Saturday Night Live. The show is produced by Lorne Michaels' Broadway Video in association with NBC's Universal Media Studios.

Upon Fallon assuming the hosting role, Late Night moved across the hall into Studio 6B, which had housed The Tonight Show under Jack Paar and then Johnny Carson. WNBC then used the space to originate its news broadcasts until shortly before Late Night with Jimmy Fallon debuted. Late Night would move back to Studio 6A for the last few months of Fallon's tenure so that 6B could be renovated for The Tonight Show's return to New York with Fallon as host.

Fallon premiered on March 2, 2009, with Robert De Niro, Justin Timberlake and Van Morrison appearing as his guests. Former Late Night host Conan O'Brien also made a cameo appearance.

The Late Night with Jimmy Fallon logo is based on the typeface Bureau Grotesque. NBC failed to correctly license the font program, causing them to be sued by the copyright holder of that program, Font Bureau, Inc. for software copyright infringement, although fonts alone cannot be copyrighted.

Fallon hosted his final episode of Late Night on February 7, 2014, when he welcomed Andy Samberg as his final guest. After a brief retrospective with Higgins about their time on Late Night, the show ended with Fallon playing drums and singing backup to "The Weight" behind an ensemble of The Muppets. Upon the conclusion of the song, Fallon exited Studio 6A and walked silently down the hall to Studio 6B, through a door featuring his Tonight Show logo, where his cast and crew awaited him with an ovation.

=== Seth Meyers ===
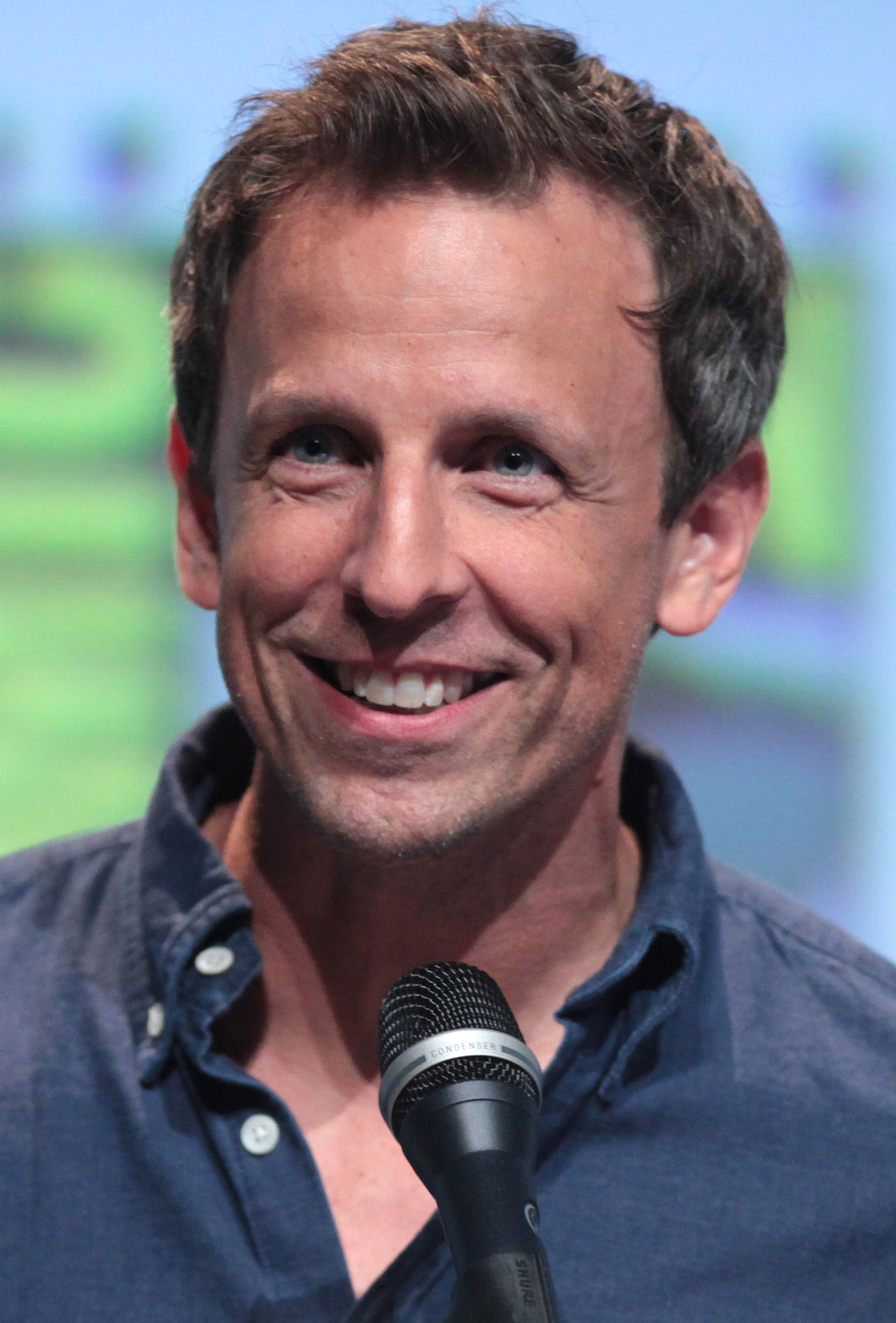
Meyers at the 2015 San Diego Comic-Con

On May 12, 2013, NBC officially announced that Seth Meyers would become the new host of Late Night following Fallon's exit to preside over The Tonight Show.

Meyers' first episode of Late Night premiered February 24, 2014. His version of the show originates from Studio 8G in Rockefeller Center, previously home to Jeopardy! during its original run plus talk shows for Phil Donahue and Rosie O'Donnell, and NBC's coverage of the National Football League. It marks the first time that Late Night and The Tonight Show have been produced out of the same studio facility. In fact, Meyers' studio is directly above Fallon's, meaning that the shows cannot tape at the same time due to inefficient soundproofing and elevator capacities for audience members. Late Night begins taping at 6:30 PM, roughly thirty minutes after production of The Tonight Show wraps.

Meyers' version of the show is orchestrated in the traditional late night talk show format. Each show usually begins with an opening monologue, then informal chatter at the desk, a comedy bit, celebrity guest interviews, and closing with a stand-up comedian or musical guest.

The house band for Meyers' iteration of Late Night was "The 8G Band", until the band was cut from the show in 2024 due to budget cuts. The 8G Band was led by eccentric actor/musician Fred Armisen, one of Meyers' former Saturday Night Live castmates. The two usually engaged in a nightly exchange in which Armisen detailed (to great length) an absurd concept he had pioneered while Meyers played the straight man and questioned its validity. When Armisen was away from the show for various reasons (including to produce his television series Portlandia), he would sometimes appear in a taped comedy bit, and as with Weinberg's tenure, guest drummers or other performers would perform for the week with the 8G Band.

As a tribute to the many NBC affiliates that air the show on a nightly basis, Meyers' desk features one coffee mug nightly sent by each NBC affiliate which sits to his left, which varies between featuring a station's logo or morning news imaging. Also on the desk is a Matryoshka doll in the style of Bill Hader's Stefon character with a veil embellishment, originally hand-crafted by Matryoshka artist Irene Hwang and commissioned for a Saturday Night Live crew holiday gift. Meyers and Stefon were "married" on SNL.

== Gag, skit, and segment highlights ==
Letterman

- Top 10 List: Featured Letterman doing top ten lists of various items.
- Viewer Mail: Featured Letterman reading viewer's mail.
- Stupid Pet Tricks
- Stupid Human Tricks

O'Brien

- In the Year 2000: Featured O'Brien with Andy or a guest delivering jokes as futuristic happenings.
- Clutch Cargo: Featured O'Brien talking to newsworthy people "via satellite" that were actually just photographs with moving lips voiced by Robert Smigel.
- Desk Driving: O'Brien and Richter (an audience member, after Richter's departure from the show) would "drive" Conan's desk through various scenes, courtesy of a green screen.
- "Walker, Texas Ranger" Lever: Featured O'Brien pulling a lever that showed ridiculous clips from the television show Walker, Texas Ranger.
- Noches de Pasion con Señor O'Brien (Nights of Passion with Mr. O'Brien): Featured O'Brien as a Spanish speaking masked vigilante.
- Late Night Budget Cuts: O'Brien telling ways their show is living in budget cuts from NBC.
- Conan Remotes: O'Brien with his staff or selected guests traveling to places around the world.

Fallon

- Head Swap: Where the heads from two celebrities are switched on another person's body.
- Thank You Notes: Features Fallon writing thank you notes to random items or people.
- Dance Your Hat and Gloves Off: Features audience members dancing to take gloves off their hands and a hat on their head.
- Ultimate Mustache Fighter: Features two UFC-like fighters dressed as mustaches.
- Wheel of Carpet Samples: Features audience members spinning a wheel of carpet samples and receiving completely random point scores.

Meyers

- A Closer Look: Features Meyers leading a humorous long-form investigation into a current political story.
- Venn Diagrams: Features Meyers putting two items with something in common together in a Venn diagram.
- Ya Burnt!: Meyers has a list of various topics, either completely burning them or declaring them "unburnable" (except for the last topic which is always interrupted by a buzzer)
- Back in My Day: Meyers reminisces about how life has changed recently, while sitting in a brown rocking chair next to his life-sized plush dog Rusty.
- Amber Says What: Ruffin talks about recent news, ending each statement with "I was like, what." Each what emphasizes a different emotion, such as excitement, anger, confusion, and shock.
- Day Drinking: Meyers goes out for drinks with a guest, while asking questions and playing drinking games.
- Late Night Press Conference: Seth askes comedic questions with out of context answers from press conference speakers being played.
- Surprise Inspection: Meyers reads jokes written by his writers that didn't make the cut for the show. The jokes get progressively worse/more offensive as the "inspection" goes on.
- The Leave Him Alone Guy: Sometimes when Meyers makes a joke about someone, John Lutz stand up and shouts "Leave him alone!" then "If you have to make fun of somebody, make fun of me!" He proceeds to list odd things about him such as, "Well you could make fun of the fact that my parents one spanked me in public."
- Corrections: Meyers reads and interacts with comments from viewers, affectionately known as "Jackals", who offer corrections via YouTube comments. This segment started during the COVID-19 pandemic without an in-person audience, and continues to be produced without a studio audience.
- Jokes Seth Can't Tell: Features Seth reading the jokes and two of his writers, usually Amber Ruffin and Jenny Hagel, delivering the punchlines.
- Fake or Florida: Features Meyers asking audience members whether a crazy news story was fake or whether it actually happened in Florida.
- This Week in Numbers: Features Meyers giving a number from a real news story followed by a number from a comedic news item.
- Next Week's News: Features Meyers, along with emergency sidekick Dale (Tim Robinson), relating a current news story and then a comedic news story for the next week.
- Instagram Filters: Features Meyers showing pictures from Instagram, then having a filter (such as Beijing or Drunk Girl filter) change the picture.
- Extreme Dog Shaming: Features Meyers showing pictures of dogs holding up signs to show what they did to be shamed (for example, Meyers' dog Frisbee, was shamed because "I go to bed right after Fallon)" or "I wanted Neil Patrick Harris to host the Emmys again."
- Anniversary Guy: Writer Conner O'Malley plays the Anniversary Guy, an audience member who interrupts Seth's monologue to discuss an extremely specific anniversary of an event, and often dresses up that is appropriate to that occasion (for instance, O'Malley fully dressed up as Shrek to celebrate the anniversary of the release of Shrek Forever After).
- Bad Men: Parody of Mad Men with Meyers portraying the Don Draper character.
- Couple Things: Features Meyers listing a "couple things" about a controversial news story.
- Fred Talks: An improvised segment involving 8G Band bandleader Fred Armisen describing some ridiculous new project that he's working on, to Meyers' disbelief.
- FredEx: When Armisen is away from the show, Meyers will send him a FedEx box full of props, and Armisen will produce a video that debuts on the show a few days later, using those props to create a character.
- Seth's Story: Meyers tells a story, detailing something that happened to him recently.
- What Does Karen Know?: Meyers and millennial staff writer Karen Chee quiz each other on cultural touchstones from their respective generations.

== "The Late Night Pickle" ==
One of the behind-the-scenes traditions of Late Night is the possession of a giant, plastic pickle by the current host. The pickle was originally sent to the Late Night offices by Letterman's staff for O'Brien and his crew, along with a note explaining that they had found the pickle in their offices when they began the show, it stayed there through their entire run, and it was only fitting that it remain there.

When O'Brien went to host The Tonight Show, he left behind the pickle for Fallon along with a handwritten note, reading in part: "Whenever you're done – which won't be for a long time – make sure you pass it on to the next sap. Knock 'em dead." Fallon first made public the pickle tradition in one of his regular video blog segments that led up to his Late Night premiere.

During his final week hosting Late Night in early 2014, Fallon passed the pickle to Meyers during their interview, marking its first on-air appearance.

During Seth Meyers' run on March 18, 2015, the pickle makes a cameo during a skit called "Hannah Horvath Joins the Late Night Writing Staff", a character Lena Dunham portrays on the HBO TV series Girls.

== Comparative TV ratings ==
- May 18, 1992; The Tonight Show Starring Johnny Carson week finale: 5.519 million viewers.
- June 25, 1993; the final Late Night with David Letterman -hosted episode, 7.521 million viewers
- May 1998; the night of the Seinfeld finale; 4.907 million viewers
- April 30, 2002; 10th anniversary of The Tonight Show with Jay Leno drew in 11.888 million viewers
- May 2004; the night of the Friends finale; 4.012 million viewers
- February 20, 2009; the final Late Night with Conan O'Brien -hosted episode, 3.4 million viewers
- Sunday, February 5, 2012; following Super Bowl XLVI; 6.087 million viewers
- February 7, 2014; the final Late Night with Jimmy Fallon hosted episode, 6.601 million viewers

== American television ratings (late-night talk shows) ==
Season	Nielsen rank	Nielsen rating	Tied with
1981–82	N/A	N/A	N/A
1982–83	N/A	N/A	N/A
1983–84	N/A	N/A	N/A
1984–85	N/A	N/A	N/A
1985–86	N/A	N/A	N/A
1986–87	N/A	N/A	N/A
1987–88	N/A	N/A	N/A
1988–89	N/A	N/A	N/A
1989–90	N/A	N/A	N/A
1990–91	N/A	N/A	N/A
1991–92	3	3.2	N/A
1992–93	4	2.8	N/A
1993–94	4	2.0	N/A
1994–95	3	2.2	N/A
1995–96	3	2.2	N/A
1996–97	4	2.5	N/A
1997–98	4	2.5	N/A
1998–99	4	2.5	N/A
1999–2000	4	2.5	N/A
2000–01	4	2.5	N/A
2001–02	3	2.5	Politically Incorrect
2002–03	3	2.6	N/A
2003–04	3	2.6	N/A
2004–05	3	2.5	N/A
2005–06	3	2.5	N/A
2006–07	3	2.4	N/A
2007–08	3	2.0	N/A
2008–09	3	2.0	N/A
2009–10	5	1.4	The Daily Show, The Colbert Report
2010–11	3	1.8	N/A
2011–12	4	1.7	The Daily Show
2012–13	4	1.7	N/A
2013–14	4	1.9	N/A
2014–15	4	1.5	N/A
2015–16	N/A	N/A	N/A
2016–17	N/A	N/A	N/A
2017–18	TBD	TBD	TBD

== Schedule ==
=== First run episodes ===
Begin date	End date	Nights	Start	End	Notes
February 1, 1982	May 28, 1987	Mon–Thurs	12:30	1:30	Letterman
June 1, 1987	August 30, 1991	Mon–Fri	12:30	1:30	Letterman
September 2, 1991	February 7, 2014	Mon–Fri	12:35	1:35	Letterman, O'Brien, Fallon
February 24, 2014	present	Mon–Fri (2014), Mon–Thurs (2014–present)	12:36	1:35	Meyers
