= The Tonight Show Band =

American television house band

The Tonight Show Band refers to the house band on the American television variety show The Tonight Show, which has created an important showcase for jazz on American television. The Tonight Show Band has changed in form and composition since the program first aired in 1954. The Roots have been The Tonight Show Band since 2014 for The Tonight Show Starring Jimmy Fallon.

== History ==
The first NBC Tonight band was on Tonight! Starring Steve Allen and was an expanded version of the band on the local New York Steve Allen Show (which had gone on the air in late July 1953). When the program went onto the NBC network, September 27, 1954, pianist Skitch Henderson was brought in as leader of the still-smallish ensemble band that had previously been led by swing era trombonist Bobby Byrne and included trumpeter Doc Severinsen. The network band included Severinsen, who played the program's closing theme, a melody of Allen's entitled "Tonight". He played that solo three times every night to accommodate the various affiliate stations that left the broadcast at different times: midnight, 12:30, and 1:00 AM Eastern time. The opening theme also was written by Allen, "Mister Moon". The band also included, among others, trombonist Lou McGarity and two French horns (Henderson's fondness for French horns can be gleaned from the fact that when Allen added a Sunday night prime-time series on NBC in June 1956, the orchestra included four French horns). The band functioned mostly as a backdrop for Allen's vocalists from the local New York show, Steve Lawrence and Eydie Gorme. When the program went network, female vocalists Pat Marshall and Pat Kirby were added, along with Andy Williams. Usually two of the singers would appear on each program. Tonight's producer, William O. Harbach had worked with Williams in the late 1940s when he was part of a nightclub act centered around Kay Thompson. Tonight! thus was the first national exposure for Williams, Lawrence, and Gorme. Though Henderson would continue as Allen's conductor on the prime-time show through 1959, the Henderson-led Tonight! band ended when Steve Allen stepped down as host at the end of January 1957. During the Tonight! America After Dark period from February through June 1957, a string of short-lived bandleaders (Lou Stein, Mort Lindsey and Johnny Guarnieri) led either a trio or quartet of musicians as the show's house band.

Henderson is credited for creating "Stump the Band", a recurring Tonight Show routine in which audience members would name an obscure or long-forgotten song title for the band to play, and Henderson and his band would attempt to recognize and perform the song, or improvise a song on the spot if they didn't. The routine began under Steve Allen's Tonight tenure. "Stump the Band" would remain a staple of Tonight under Paar and Carson into the 1990s and would later be reprised by Late Show with David Letterman.

Ernie Kovacs had his own band, LeRoy Holmes and His Orchestra, for Tonight Starring Ernie Kovacs, which aired Mondays and Tuesdays in the 1956-57 season,.

José Melis, a friend of Jack Paar, took over as bandleader when Paar became the host later in 1957. Melis made The Tonight Show Band part of the show's comic ensemble, utilizing his improvisational comedy skills: in the "Telephone Game," he would write songs on the spot about four-digit telephone numbers given to him by audience members, while "Stump the Band", remained as a holdover from Allen and Skitch Henderson's years.

Henderson returned in 1962 with a 16-piece band—which on occasion would be expanded with additional personnel such as string players (for backing such singers as Eydie Gorme) and extra percussionists—as Johnny Carson took over from Paar. From 1962 until 1992, when the show was known as The Tonight Show Starring Johnny Carson, the band was a 17-piece big band. During the Carson era, the band was always billed as "The NBC Orchestra" (not to be confused with the NBC Symphony Orchestra) and sometimes "Doc Severinsen and the NBC Orchestra". Carson increased the band's budget, and many of the players were veterans of the prime-time Steve Allen Show band, such as Severinsen. Other notable members of the trumpet section included Clark Terry, Bernie Glow, Yank Lawson, and Jimmy Maxwell, along with saxophonists Hymie Shertzer, Walt Levinsky, and Al Klink. Saxophonist-arranger Tommy Newsom joined the band in the second year. Legendary swing era bassist Bob Haggart often anchored the rhythm section and Gene Bertoncini alternated on guitar with Bucky Pizzarelli. The drum chair tended to alternate between Bobby Rosengarden and Ed Shaughnessy, who along with Newsom, trumpeter Snooky Young, pianist Ross Tompkins and baritone sax player Don Ashworth moved to California with the program in 1972. After Rosengarden left the band to become the conductor on ABC's The Dick Cavett Show, Grady Tate became a frequent presence in the drum chair.

In 1966, Henderson (and Severinsen) left the show as the conductor from the original NBC late-night show from 1951, Broadway Open House, Milton Delugg came in for one year. In 1967 Severinsen returned, this time as conductor, and with basically the same personnel nonetheless inaugurated a somewhat more aggressive sound (using, for example, an electric bass, and a brassier version of the "Here's Johnny" theme). In Burbank, for Carson's last two decades as host, the Severinsen-led band included the core that had moved from New York along with such noted jazz players as saxophonists Ernie Watts, Pete Christlieb, and Bill Perkins; trumpeters Conte Candoli and John Audino; guitarist Bob Bain, and bassist Joel Di Bartolo. Occasionally, drummer Louie Bellson would sit in for Shaughnessy. When Jay Leno replaced Carson in 1992, he ended the tradition of a large in-house orchestra. Branford Marsalis became musical director, and a smaller band was formed. Marsalis was succeeded in 1995 by Kevin Eubanks.

In June 2009, Conan O'Brien became the host, and Max Weinberg replaced Kevin Eubanks as bandleader, with the house band from Late Night with Conan O'Brien forming Max Weinberg and The Tonight Show Band. Eubanks and his band migrated to The Jay Leno Show in September 2009 as the Primetime Band. When Conan O'Brien left The Tonight Show in January 2010, Leno returned as host, bringing back Kevin Eubanks, who took a more limited role. Eubanks announced his departure from the show in February 2010; his last show was May 28, 2010.

On June 7, 2010, Rickey Minor became the bandleader and wrote the theme song.

When Jimmy Fallon became the host in 2014, the show returned to New York City and The Roots became the house band, migrating from their role as house band on Late Night with Jimmy Fallon. The Roots added two horn players from Sharon Jones & The Dap-Kings; bandleader and musical director Questlove noted, "You can't be The Tonight Show without a horn section". Engineer Steven Mandel produces the guest walk-on songs along with Questlove and The Roots.

== Tonight Show Band lineups ==
Additional former members of the New York Tonight Show Band from 1962 onward include:

- Bass: Eddie Safranski, Bob Haggart, Julie Ruggiero, Bill Takis,
- Drums: Grady Tate, Bobby Rosengarden
- Guitar: Bucky Pizzarelli, Gene Bertoncini
- Piano: Derek Smith
- Saxophone: Al Howard, Al Klink, Arnie Lawrence, Bobby Tricarico, Deane Kincaide, Don Raffell, Harold Feldman, Hymie Schertzer, Lew Tabackin, Paul Ricci, Sid Cooper, Buzz Brauner, Wally Kane, Walt Levinsky
- Trombone: Bob Alexander, Buddy Morrow, Dick Lieb, Herb Wise, Paul Faulise, Sonny Russo, Sy Berger, Will Bradley, Willie Dennis
- Trumpet: Bernie Glow, Bob McCoy, Carl Poole, Clark Terry, Dick Perry, Jimmy Maxwell, Joe Ferrante, John Frosk, Mel Davis, Snooky Young, Yank Lawson

=== With Johnny Carson ===
- Bandleader: Skitch Henderson, Milton Delugg, Doc Severinsen, Tommy Newsom
- Flute, Clarinet and Saxophone: Bill Perkins, Ernie Watts, John Bambridge, Pete Christlieb, Tom Peterson, Tommy Newsom, Don Menza, Donald Ashworth, Lew Tabackin, Dick Spencer
- Trumpet and Flugelhorn: Allen Vizzutti, Chuck Findley, Conte Candoli, Doc Severinsen, Frank Szabo, John Audino, Maury Harris, Oscar Brashear, Pete Candoli, Snooky Young, Clark Terry
- Trombone: Bruce Paulson, Ernie Tack, Gil Falco, Mike Daigeau, Hal Crook
- Piano: Ross Tompkins, Russ Freeman
- Guitar: Bob Bain, Bucky Pizzarelli, Herb Ellis, Mitch Holder, Peter Woodford, Tony Mottola
- Bass: Joel DiBartolo, John B. Williams, John/Jennifer Leitham
- Drums: Ed Shaughnessy, Jack Sperling, Louie Bellson, Shelly Manne, Colin Bailey

=== With Jay Leno ===
- Bandleader: Branford Marsalis, Kevin Eubanks
- Bass: Derrick Murdock, Stanley Sargeant, Bob Hurst, Kenny Davis
- Drums: Marvin Smith, Jeff "Tain" Watts
- Guitar: Kevin Eubanks
- Keyboard: Gerry Etkins, Kenny Kirkland
- Percussion/Vocals: Vicki Randle
- Saxophone: Branford Marsalis, Ralph Moore
- Trombone: Matt Finders
- Trumpet: Sal Marquez, Chuck Findley, Lee Thornburg, Kye Palmer

=== With Conan O'Brien ===
- Bandleader: Max Weinberg, Jimmy Vivino
- Bass: Mike Merritt
- Clarinet: Jerry Vivino
- Drums: Max Weinberg, James Wormworth
- Flute: Jerry Vivino
- Guitar: Jimmy Vivino, Mark Pender
- Keyboards: Scott Healy
- Percussion: James Wormworth, Ronnie Gutierrez
- Saxophone: Jerry Vivino
- Trombone: Richie "La Bamba" Rosenberg
- Trumpet: Mark Pender
- Vocals: Mark Pender

=== With Jay Leno (second tenure) ===
- Bandleader: Rickey Minor
- Bass: Rickey Minor
- Drums: Teddy Campbell
- Guitar: Paul Jackson Jr.
- Keyboard: J. Wayne Linsey, David Delhomme
- Percussion: Kevin Ricard
- Saxophone: Randolph Ellis, Miguel Gandelman
- Trombone: Garrett Smith
- Trumpet: Raymond Monteiro
- Vocals: Dorian Holley

=== With Jimmy Fallon ===
- Bandleader: Questlove
- Bass: Mark Kelley
- Drums: Questlove
- Flute: Ian Hendrickson-Smith
- Guitar: Captain Kirk Douglas
- Keyboards: James Poyser, Raymond Angry, Kamal Gray
- Percussion: Stro Elliot
- Saxophone: Ian Hendrickson-Smith
- Sousaphone: Damon "Tuba Gooding Jr." Bryson
- Trumpet: Dave Guy
- Vocals: Black Thought

== Discography ==
With Skitch Henderson and "The Tonight Show" Band

- Skitch...Tonight! (Columbia, 1964)
- More Skitch Tonight! (Columbia, 1965)

With Doc Severinsen and "The Tonight Show" Band

- The Tonight Show Band (Amherst, 1986)
- The Tonight Show Band Vol. II (Amherst, 1987)
- Once More...With Feelng (Amherst, 1991)
- Merry Christmas From Doc Severinsen and The Tonight Show Orchestra (Amherst, 1991)
