= Vivino (surname) =

Vivino is a surname. Notable people with the surname include:

- Donna Vivino (born 1978), American musical theater actress and singer
- Floyd Vivino (1951–2026), American actor
- Jerry Vivino (born 1954), American musician
- Jimmy Vivino (born 1955), American musician, singer, and producer
