= List of Conan episodes =

Conan is an American television program on TBS hosted by Conan O'Brien from 2010 to 2021. O'Brien previously served as host of Late Night with Conan O'Brien for over 16 years, and as host of The Tonight Show with Conan O'Brien from June 1, 2009 until January 22, 2010 when the show was canceled amidst the 2010 Tonight Show conflict. The conflict resulted in the former host, Jay Leno, being reinstated following the 2010 Winter Olympics on NBC, and O'Brien touring the country on his Legally Prohibited from Being Funny on Television Tour.

The series is an American late-night talk show, which began on November 8, 2010, and aired four nights a week. The show was filmed on Stage 15 at Warner Bros.' studio in Burbank, California. The series is scripted by a team of writers, with Mike Sweeney serving as head writer for the show. Shortly after O'Brien's departure from Tonight, the show, along with several of the show's production staff, was nominated for four Emmy Awards, including Outstanding Variety, Music or Comedy Series.

In addition to O'Brien serving as host, comedian Andy Richter served as the show's announcer, and as a sidekick to O'Brien. Jimmy Vivino and the Basic Cable Band, formerly known as "The Max Weinberg 7" and briefly as "Max Weinberg and The Tonight Show Band", serves as the house band. The show follows the established six-piece format used during Conan O'Brien's tenure as host of The Tonight Show. The first two segments includes a monologue by O'Brien, sometimes accompanied by altered news clips, or several brief comedy sketches. Interview with two guests will likely follow, as well as a musical or comedy performance.

Unusual for a talk show, the titles for each episode (a la Quinn Martin) were often offbeat in nature, however they were removed on January 29, 2014.
