= Derrick Murdock =

American bassist

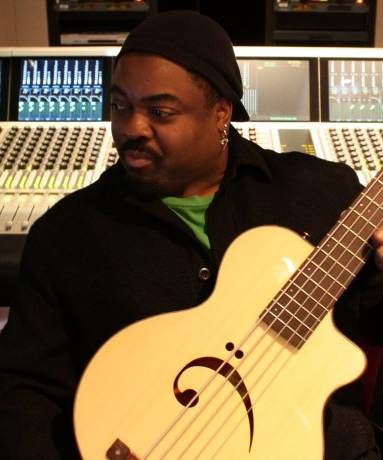
- Derrick Murdock in the control room at the Tonight Show with Jay Leno

Background information
- Born: Derrick Murdock; Philadelphia, Pennsylvania
- Genres: Funk, R&B, Rock, Latin, jazz, jazz fusion
- Occupation: Musician
- Instrument: Electric bass
- Years active: 1988–present

Derrick Murdock is an American bassist, composer and producer. He is best known as the former house bassist in The Tonight Show Band on The Tonight Show with Jay Leno from 2006 to 2011.

In 1992, Murdock began touring with Miles Jaye and has had an active musical career since. Some of the artists he has performed and/or recorded with include Sheena Easton, Capital Cities, Michael Bolton, B. B. King, Chuck Berry, Dr. Dre, Will Smith, Patti Austin, Natalie Cole, Huey Lewis, Rose Royce, Mandrill, Cedric the Entertainer, Jim Carrey, Bill Cosby, Solomon Burke, The 5th Dimension, Marilyn McCoo, Billy Davis Jr., Peter Frampton, The Jazz Crusaders, Frank Gambale, Tom Scott, Jeff Lorber, Eric Marienthal, Cherrelle, The Dazz Band, Deniece Williams, Andraé Crouch, Bobby Caldwell, Angela Bofill, Thelma Houston, David Benoit, Hugh Masekela, Bobby Lyle, Bob Mamet, Jon Lucien, and Miles Jaye.

Murdock uses the TC Electronic RH450 head, RS210, RS410, RS212 cabinet and Roland Cube-120XL for amplification. He plays on basses by Fender, Ken Smith, and Demars Guitars.

== Selected discography ==
With Bryan Savage

- Soul Temptation (1998)

With Bob Mamet

- Adventures in Jazz (1997)

With Goin Public

- Free Exchange (1996)

With the Jazz Crusaders

- Power of Our Music: The Endangered Species (2000)

With Mandrill

- Driving While Black and Brown (2001)

With Rose Royce

- Greatest Hits (2002)
- Greatest Hits: Studio Cut CD (2009)

== links https://www.namm.org/library/oral-history/derrick-murdock ==
- Derrick Murdock at IMDb

https://www.namm.org/library/oral-history/derrick-murdock
