= Floyd Vivino =

American entertainer (1951–2026)

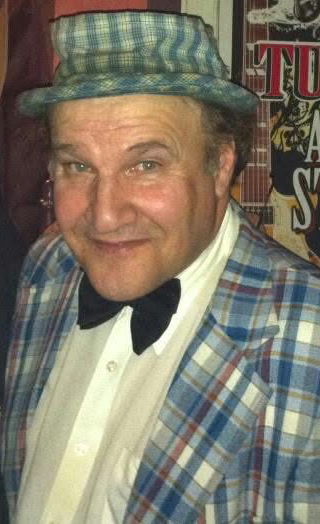
- Vivino in 2013
- Born: October 19, 1951; Paterson, New Jersey, U.S.
- Died: January 22, 2026 (aged 74); Hackensack, New Jersey, U.S.
- Occupations: TV & radio host, musician, actor
- Years active: 1974–2026
- Children: 5
- Relatives: Jerry Vivino (brother); Jimmy Vivino (brother); Donna Vivino (niece)
- Awards: Guinness Book of World Records - longest time playing a piano (1999)
- Website: unclefloyd.net

Floyd Vivino (October 19, 1951 – January 22, 2026), known professionally as Uncle Floyd, was an American television, film, radio and stage performer primarily known for his comedy/variety television show The Uncle Floyd Show (1974–1998). Vivino had a cult following and a 13,000-member fan club. David Bowie and John Lennon considered themselves fans. He also ran as a write-in candidate for Governor of New Jersey in 2009 and 2017. He holds the Guinness World Record for longest time playing a piano.

== Early life ==
Vivino was born in Paterson, New Jersey, to Jerry Vivino Sr., a jazz trumpeter, and Emily Vivino. He grew up in Paterson, Point Pleasant, Island Heights, and Glen Rock. He attended Glen Rock High School where he produced a musical revue starring the school's janitorial staff. Vivino began his live-performance career working as a child tap dancer in Atlantic City, New Jersey, and began his broadcast career over a friend's pirate radio station while in high school.

He was the older brother of Jerry Vivino and Jimmy Vivino, who were members of the Basic Cable Band, formerly known as the Max Weinberg 7.

== Career ==
=== The Uncle Floyd Show ===
The Uncle Floyd Show aired in New Jersey and New York from 1974 to 1998. The show adopted the visual style of a children's television show but used it to deliver deliberately odd, improvised, and often adult-leaning humor that functioned as a parody of the genre rather than a conventional kids' show. Much of the humor had a twist aimed at adults, in the style of shows by predecessor Soupy Sales (1950s–1970s). The show featured character comedy, puppetry, some audience participation, musical guests, and Vivino's piano playing. One of Vivino's puppet sidekicks, actually a Pelham Puppets Walter Ego ventriloquial puppet, was named Oogie.

Vivino would interact on-air with off-camera staff and sidekicks. Local bands such as The Smithereens, Mucky Pup, and R. Stevie Moore, and touring performers with Benny Bell, Blue Öyster Cult, Jan and Dean, Joe Jackson, David Johansen, Cyndi Lauper, NRBQ, The Misfits, Monty Python, Peter Tork, The Ramones, Squeeze, Paul Simon, Dave Edmunds, The Blasters, Marshall Crenshaw, Eddie Money, The Boomtown Rats, and Tiny Tim also appeared on the program. Jon Bon Jovi made his television debut on the show.

The show made its debut on UA-Columbia Cable TV of New Jersey, now part of Cablevision, on January 29, 1974. Beginning in November 1974, it aired on UHF-TV station WBTB-TV, Newark, broadcasting on channels 68 and 60, which later became WTVG, then WWHT, as the station's ownership changed.

The show's first cast members in 1974 included Pat Cupo, Bob D. Caterino (known for his Groucho Marx skits), and Marc Nathan, the cameraman. Later members were Scott Gordon, Craig "Mugsy" Calam, Richard "Netto" Cornetto, Jim Monaco, Art "Looney Skip" Rooney, Charlie Stoddard, David "Artie Delmar" Burd, and Clark the Wonder Dog. A phonograph album based on the show, The Uncle Floyd Show Album, was released on Mercury Records, and a number of 45 rpm singles on the Bioya label were released around 1979–83. Vivino also released a few CDs as a solo artist.

In 1982, The Uncle Floyd Show went into a small syndication circuit, which included 17 markets, among them WNBC-TV channel 4 in New York, then WTAF-TV channel 29 in Philadelphia, WPWR-TV Channel 60 in Chicago, WSBK-TV Channel 38 in Boston, and WHCT-TV Channel 18 in Hartford. It aired on weeknights after Late Night with David Letterman and SCTV on WNBC.

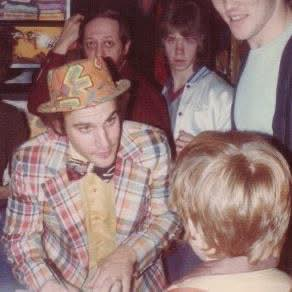
Uncle Floyd meets a young fan at Looney Tunez Records in Wayne, New Jersey, in 1981.

From 1983 to 1986, The Uncle Floyd Show ran on the statewide PBS network, New Jersey Network, which consisted of four channels: WNJS (Channel 23, Camden), WNJN (Channel 50, Montclair), WNJB (Channel 58, New Brunswick), and WNJT (Channel 52, Trenton). When the show was cancelled, the president of the Uncle Floyd Show fan club petitioned the New Jersey Network and received $159 back that he had donated to the public broadcasting station on the understanding that it would go directly to the show.

Starting in late 1986, The Uncle Floyd Show was then seen on statewide cable channel CTN (Cable Television Network Of New Jersey). During this time, the show went through various incarnations, with Vivino sometimes hosting a music-only show, showcasing local bands. Vivino also hosted a show called Uncle Floyd's New Jersey, in which he would visit various towns and businesses in the state. After more than 7000 episodes, first-run production of The Uncle Floyd Show ended in 1992, with CTN showing repeats until that channel's demise in 1999.

From 1992 until 1996, cast member Mugsy produced and appeared in a spin-off show entitled The Eleventh Hour. The show was written and produced in the same vein as The Uncle Floyd Show. It was broadcast live from studios in Nutley, New Jersey, on the statewide CTN cable network, and on two Northern New Jersey public-access channels, Cablevision of Oakland and Suburban Cablevision of New Jersey in East Orange (later acquired by Comcast Corporation).

In 1998, production of The Uncle Floyd Show began in the Cablevision studio in Oakland, New Jersey. One hundred shows were produced and aired on Cablevision systems throughout the region. Musical guests included Marky Ramone and The Misfits. Although viewer response was enthusiastic, the show was canceled by Cablevision management after the first cycle of episodes.

At its peak, the Uncle Floyd Show fan club had 13,000 members.

=== Other work ===
Vivino performed as an emcee, a stand-up comic and a live musician at shows up to 300 times a year at small venues across New Jersey and New York: nightclubs, restaurants, and Knights of Columbus halls at night, "Meatball the Clown" shows at schools during the day. He recorded a jingle for the Wild West City theme park and performed there often.

Vivino appeared on several television shows filmed in New York City, including Law & Order, 100 Centre Street, and Cosby, and was a regular on the Sirius Satellite Radio program The Wiseguys Show on Raw Dog Comedy (channel 104) hosted by former The Sopranos cast member Vincent Pastore. Vivino performed the jingle of, as well as appeared in the TV commercial for, the frontier-themed amusement park Wild West City, located in Byram Township, New Jersey, a jingle that is still used today by the park. He also had parts in the movies Good Morning, Vietnam, Crazy People, and Mr. Wonderful. He also shot a scene for One-Trick Pony, which was deleted. In 2000, Vivino played the bit part of an announcer in the Insane Clown Posse movie, Big Money Hustlas.

From 1987 to 2013, Vivino hosted The Italian-American Serenade on WVIP-FM 93.5 radio out of New Rochelle, New York, where he played Italian music on a Sunday afternoon program. He claimed to have the largest collection of Italian records in the world.

In 1999, Vivino set a Guinness World Record by playing a piano continuously for 24 hours and 15 minutes.

From 2001 to 2004, "Uncle Floyd's Restaurant" operated out of the Holiday Inn in Wayne. Vivino performed there several nights a week.

In January 2013, Vivino began the internet-based radio program The Uncle Floyd Radio Show, which was streamed twice a week from the show's website and through various SHOUTcast mobile apps and links.

In April 2013, Uncle Floyd's Garage Sale Music began on WVOX 1460 in New Rochelle. This show featured records from Vivino's large personal collection, most of which he found in thrift shops, yard sales, and curbside garbage piles. The program featured discussion between Vivino and his co-host about the music and artists whose recordings are heard on the show, many of whom Vivino worked with personally. Also, some segments feature written comments and questions submitted by listeners. Beginning in June 2014, a second weekly Garage Sale Music program began airing and streaming on Sundays 9:00 to noon over WFDU 89.1 FM in Teaneck, New Jersey. The WVOX program ended in September 2018, returning to The Italian-American Serenade format.

Vivino was selected to be the vocalist on Vince Giordano's 2020 recording of "Ain't Misbehavin'", but was replaced by Loudon Wainwright III due to a conflicting appearance commitment.

Vivino hosted and starred in The Last Authentic American Traveling Burlesque Show, a tribute to the lost entertainment style of burlesque.

Vivino also wrote a weekly column covering Italian and Italian American topics and culture, titled Italian American Serenade, for the Italian Tribune from 2000 to 2026. He was also the long time master of ceremonies for the Italian Tribune's Columbus Gala, which highlights accomplishments of Italian Americans from the proceeding year.

In 2009 and 2017, Vivino ran for Governor of New Jersey as a write-in candidate.

== Tributes ==
The first band to refer to The Uncle Floyd Show in a song was the Johnny Gork Band from Flemington, New Jersey, released on a 45 rpm single in 1982.

David Bowie, a fan of Vivino's television show, recorded the song "Slip Away" on his 2002 album, Heathen, as a tribute. The lyrics mention Uncle Floyd and his puppets Oogie and Bones Boy. When asked how he had learned of the show, Bowie replied, "John Lennon told me about it." He also mentioned Iggy Pop regularly watching the show. While in Berlin in 2002 touring for his Heathen album, Bowie said, "This is another new song. It's about a television hero in America from '70s that myself, and Lennon and Iggy Pop used to watch in the afternoons. Crazy guy, and we were very addled and used to love fooling around watching this guy Uncle Floyd. And his song is called "Slip Away". This story is also told in the 2024 documentary Flipside, which features Uncle Floyd.

The song "Work for Food" by Dramarama, on the 1994 album Hi-Fi Sci-Fi features the Uncle Floyd Show in the lyrics. Footage of Vivino as Cowboy Charlie also appears in the video for the song. The members of Dramarama were from Wayne, New Jersey, and made their first television appearance on The Uncle Floyd Show.

The Ramones also recognized The Uncle Floyd Show in their song "It's Not My Place (In the Nine to Five World)", as well as in various live appearances. Also, Ramones guitarist Johnny Ramone could often be seen wearing an Uncle Floyd Show T-shirt in pictures of the band, while Joey Ramone often wore an Uncle Floyd Show button on his leather jacket.

Another fan of Vivino's was Patrick McDonnell who designed the intertitles for characters on The Uncle Floyd Show which included Julia Stepchild, Don Ho-Hum, Flojo the TV Clown, and Don Goomba. McDonnell's punk rock band Steel Tips was the first of many musical acts to perform on the show.

== Personal life and death ==
Vivino was married and divorced three times. He had a daughter and two sons from his second marriage, and three sons from his third marriage. He was the uncle of musical theater actress Donna Vivino.

In April 2022, Vivino revealed that he had been diagnosed with cancer in both his bladder and prostate.

In July 2023, Vivino suffered a stroke and was hospitalized. A full recovery was expected, but he died from complications of the stroke in Hackensack, New Jersey, on January 22, 2026, at the age of 74.
