= Wild West City =

Theme park in Stanhope, New Jersey, US

- Interactive map of Wild West City
- Location: Stanhope, New Jersey, U.S.
- Coordinates: 40.93489°N 74.71060°W
- Opened: 1957
- Operating season: May – October
- Website: www.wildwestcity.com

Wild West City is a Wild West theme park based on 1880s Dodge City, Kansas, located in Stanhope, New Jersey.

Uncle Floyd Vivino recorded a jingle and often performed at the park.

== In popular culture ==
The park was used as a filming location for The Whitest Kids U' Know season 3, episode 3 sketch "Water Balloons".

Since December 2024, the park has been used as a filming location for vignettes featured on AEW Dynamite for the professional wrestler Bandido.
