= Mike Merritt (musician) =

American bassist (born 1955)

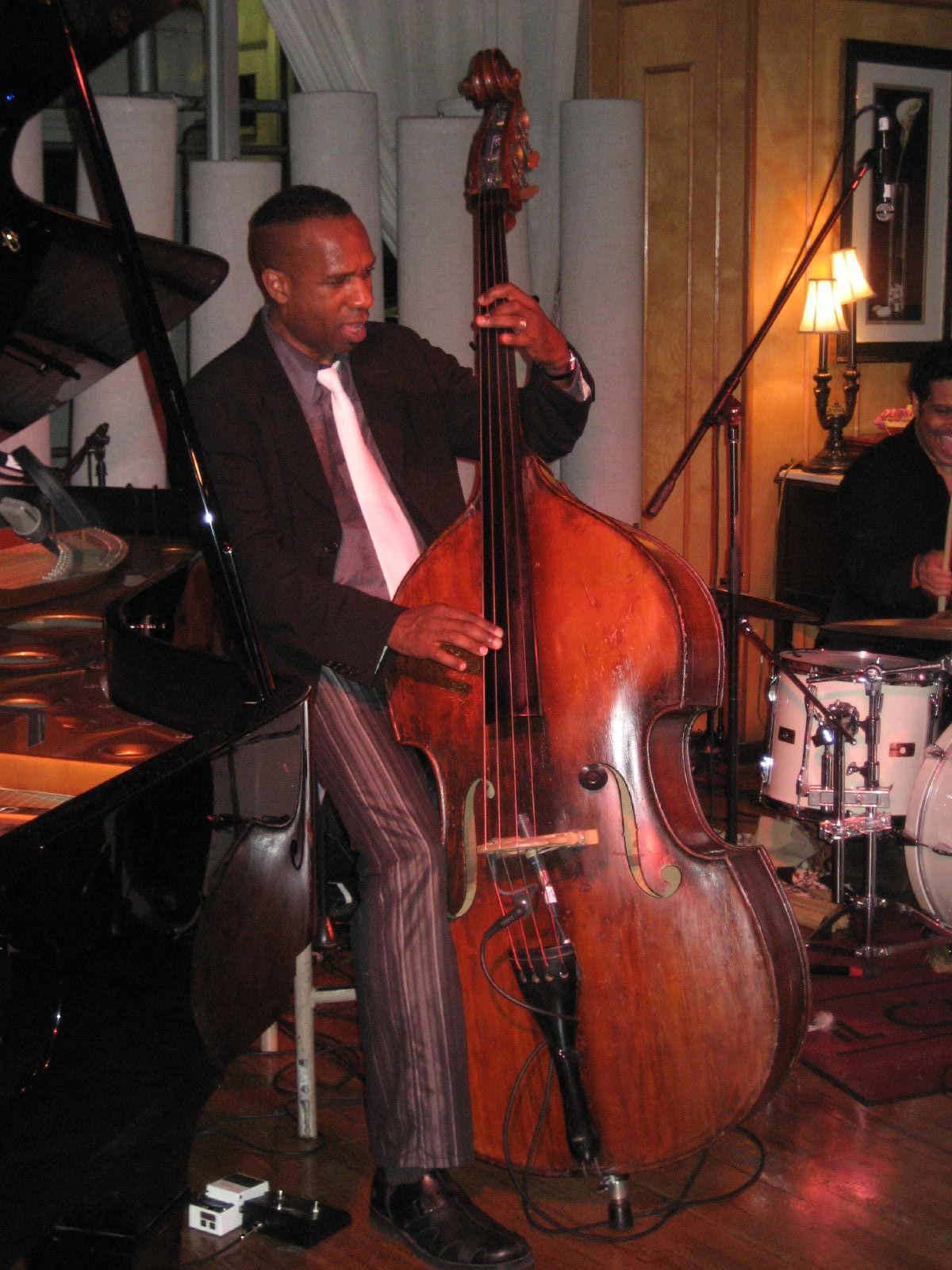
Mike Merritt recording with Paul Tillotson's Love Trio

Michael Monroe Merritt (born July 28, 1955) is an American bassist best known for playing with the Conan O'Brien house bands: The Max Weinberg 7 on Late Night with Conan O'Brien in New York, Max Weinberg and The Tonight Show Band on The Tonight Show with Conan O'Brien in Los Angeles, and The Basic Cable Band on Conan also in Los Angeles.

Merritt was born in Philadelphia, Pennsylvania. His father is jazz bassist Jymie Merritt, who has performed and recorded with many jazz and blues musicians, most notably Art Blakey and the Jazz Messengers. Mike began lessons on upright with Eligio Rossi then studies with percussionist/composer Warren McLendon. Although his father was primarily an upright bass player, he also owned a 1964 Fender Jazz Bass which Mike felt was the instrument he was meant to play. During this time Mike absorbed a number of influences ranging from jazz to rhythm and blues to blues to rock.

After playing in a jazz group called Forerunner/Nuclei, Mike moved to New York in 1980 at the suggestion of the members of the Jazz Messengers. It was here that he began playing with blues legend Johnny Copeland and continued through 1989. While on the road with Copeland, he backed up Chuck Berry pianist Johnnie Johnson which led to Mike working with him off and on for the next several years.

It was also around this time that Mike started gigging around the New York scene where he regularly played with future members of The Max Weinberg 7. In 1993, guitarist Jimmy Vivino called Mike about a group being put together by Max Weinberg to audition for the house band on what would become Late Night with Conan O'Brien. The band was there for the entire run of the show and its successors.

Mike plays a variety of basses including Rickenbacker, Lakland, Fender, Hofner, the Zeta Crossover bass and a 1935 Kurt Moenning 3/4’ Acoustic Bass.
