= Donna Vivino =

American actress

- Education: Barnard College (BA)
- Occupations: Actress, singer
- Website: donnavivino.com

Donna Vivino is an American theatre, television, and film actress and singer. She is known for playing Elphaba in the Broadway production of Wicked and as the original Young Cosette in Les Misérables on Broadway.

== Personal life ==
Vivino was raised in Fair Lawn, New Jersey, where she attended Fair Lawn High School, and graduated from Barnard College of Columbia University in New York City.

Donna is the daughter of musician Jerry Vivino and was the niece of the late Floyd Vivino.

== Theatre credits ==
Broadway
Show Title	Role	Venue	Citation
Les Misérables	Young Cosette	Imperial Theatre	
Saturday Night Fever	Piano/Vocals	Minskoff Theatre	
Hairspray	Shelly/Denizen of Baltimore/Understudy for Tracy Turnblad, Prudy Pingleton, Velma von Tussle, Gym Teacher, and Matron	Neil Simon Theatre	
Wicked	Standby for Elphaba	Gershwin Theatre	
Martin Short: Fame Becomes Me	Comedy All Star	Bernard Jacobs Theater	
Hell's Kitchen	Standby for Jersey	Shubert Theatre	

Off-Broadway
Show Title	Role	Company	Citation
Stars of David (concert version)		DR2 Theatre	

National tours
Show Title	Role	Citation
Cats	Grizabella	
Wicked	Elphaba / Elphaba standby	
Hairspray		

Regional theatre
Show Title	Role	Company	Citation
Guys and Dolls	Miss Adelaide	A Contemporary Theatre	
Next to Normal	Diana Goodman	Bristol Riverside Theater	
Merrily We Roll Along	Mary Flynn	Wallis Annenberg Center for the Performing Arts	
Finks	Natalie	TheatreWorks Silicon Valley	
Grease	Betty Rizzo	St. Louis Muny	
The Opposite of Sex		Magic Theatre	

Television, film, and web series
Title	Role	Year
Hometown	Tess Abbott (2 episodes)	1985
ABC Afterschool Special	Kendall Bard (1 episode)	1987
All My Children	Young Erica Kane (1 episode)	1988
Married To It	Lucy Rothenberg	1991
Slim Pig	Mouse (voice, 3 episodes)	1996
My Sassy Girl	Woman of No Consequence #2	2008
A Gifted Man	Rhonda (1 episode)	2012
Submissions Only	Serena Maxwell (10 episodes)	2012-2014
Good Friday	Emily Cole	2020
Law & Order	Rachel Ford (1 episode)	2023
Family Affair (short film)	Beverly	2023
Ezra	Woman at Michigan Club	2023
Marvin is Sorry (short film)	Alice	2024
FBI: Most Wanted	Carlotta Tomassi (1 episode)	2024
