= NBC Studios =

NBC Studios may refer to:

- NBC Studios (New York City), 30 Rockefeller Plaza in Manhattan, home of NBC TV, NBCUniversal, MSNBC, WNBC
- 10 Universal City Plaza in Los Angeles, home of NBCUniversal Cable Entertainment
- NBC Tower, office building in Chicago
- The Burbank Studios, television production facility in Burbank, California
- NBC Studios (production company), former television production company
