= Conan (talk show) =

American late-night talk show (2010–2021)

- Genre: Comedy; Talk show
- Created by: Conan O'Brien
- Written by: Matt O'Brien (head writer)
- Directed by: Billy Bollotino
- Presented by: Conan O'Brien
- Announcer: Andy Richter (sidekick)
- Music by: Jimmy Vivino and the Basic Cable Band (2010–2018)
- Country of origin: United States
- Original language: English
- No. of seasons: 11
- No. of episodes: 1,510 (list of episodes)

Production
- Executive producers: Conan O'Brien; Jeff Ross
- Producers: Tracy King; Mike Sweeney; Matt O'Brien
- Production locations: Warner Bros. Studios (2010–2020); Coronet Theatre (2020–2021)
- Camera setup: Multi-camera
- Running time: 60 minutes (2010–2018); 30 minutes (2019–2021)
- Production companies: Conaco; Warner Bros. Television

Original release
- Network: TBS
- Release: November 8, 2010 – June 24, 2021

Related
- Late Night with Conan O'Brien; The Tonight Show with Conan O'Brien

Conan is an American television variety and late-night talk show that aired each Monday through Thursday at 11:00 p.m. Eastern time, on TBS in the United States for 11 seasons, from 2010 to 2021. The show premiered on November 8, 2010, and was hosted by writer, comedian and performer Conan O'Brien. He was accompanied by his long-time sidekick Andy Richter. Running for eleven years and identifying as a traditional late-night talk show, Conan drew its comedy from recent news stories, political figures, and prominent celebrities, as well as aspects of the show itself. The hour-long show was akin to O'Brien's previous NBC late-night shows and was directed by Billy Bollotino.

Starting January 22, 2019, the show was reformatted to a half-hour length. In November 2020, TBS announced that the show would air its final episode in June 2021. The final episode aired on June 24, 2021.

Guests for the show came from a wide range of cultural sources, and included actors, musicians, authors, athletes and political figures.

== Episode format ==
=== 2010–2018: Hour-long format ===
==== Structure ====
Conan initially followed the established six-piece late-night format popularized by evening talk show hosts such as Johnny Carson and David Letterman, and previously executed during O'Brien's tenures as host of NBC's Late Night and The Tonight Show. Each episode of Conan from its first eight years runs 60 minutes in length, including commercials, and typically consists of:

- Act 1: Monologue
- Act 2: Comedy Bit(s)
- Act 3: Celebrity Interview 1
- Act 4: Celebrity Interview 1 continued
- Act 5: Celebrity Interview 2
- Act 6: Musical or Stand-Up Comedy Guest, Signoff

==== Opening titles ====
The original hour-long show opened with Richter proclaiming "Coming to you from Warner Bros. Studios in Burbank, it's Conan!", and introducing O'Brien, The Basic Cable Band, as well as the episode's guests. For the first several seasons, each episode had a title, which Richter would announce at the end of the opening sequence. The titles were in the style of old-fashioned murder-mystery radio shows, television sitcoms or other assorted jokes. The episode titles were dropped in early 2014.

The original title sequence was designed by Rob Ashe, Dan Dome and Eric McGilloway. There were several different variations of the opening credits, with the final product being inspired by graphic designer Saul Bass. The opening design process was described by Ashe as utilizing "organic-looking textures made of construction paper, soak them in soda, and light them in Photoshop."

==== Monologue ====
O'Brien opened each episode with a monologue drawing from current news stories and issues. The monologue was sometimes accompanied by clips and brief comedy skits, in addition to occasional interactions between O'Brien and Richter, and the audience.

==== Sketches and comedy bits ====
One or more comedy bits followed the monologue. Following the monologue, some comedy bits (such as those based on video clips) were presented from the monologue stage. Following the first commercial break, additional comedy sketches were typically presented from the desk area. Some sketches were original and appeared only once. Occasionally an additional sketch would air between the first and second guest.

=== 2019–2021: Half-hour format ===
In May 2018, O'Brien and TBS announced the show would be reformatted into a 30-minute show, with a looser structure starting 2019.

In January 2019, O'Brien gave a more detailed description of the new format of his show. It would not feature a band or a desk area, and for the first time as host of a talk show, O'Brien would not be wearing a suit. He commented, "I really don't miss the desk. It started to feel like I'm doing someone's taxes." The last hour-long regular episode aired on October 4, 2018. The new reformatted version premiered on January 22, 2019, on TBS. O'Brien's first guest for the new-look show was Tom Hanks.

Due to the COVID-19 pandemic, the program switched to a remotely-produced format from O'Brien's home beginning March 30, 2020. In July 2020, it was announced that Conan would continue with this format, but would now be filmed with limited on-site staff from the Coronet Theatre in Los Angeles and no studio audience — making it the first American late-night talk show to return to filming outside of the host's residence (albeit still not from its main studio). O'Brien explained that "I got started doing improv at the Coronet in 1986 and I'm glad we've figured out a way to safely keep that theater going during this lockdown."

== Episodes on location ==
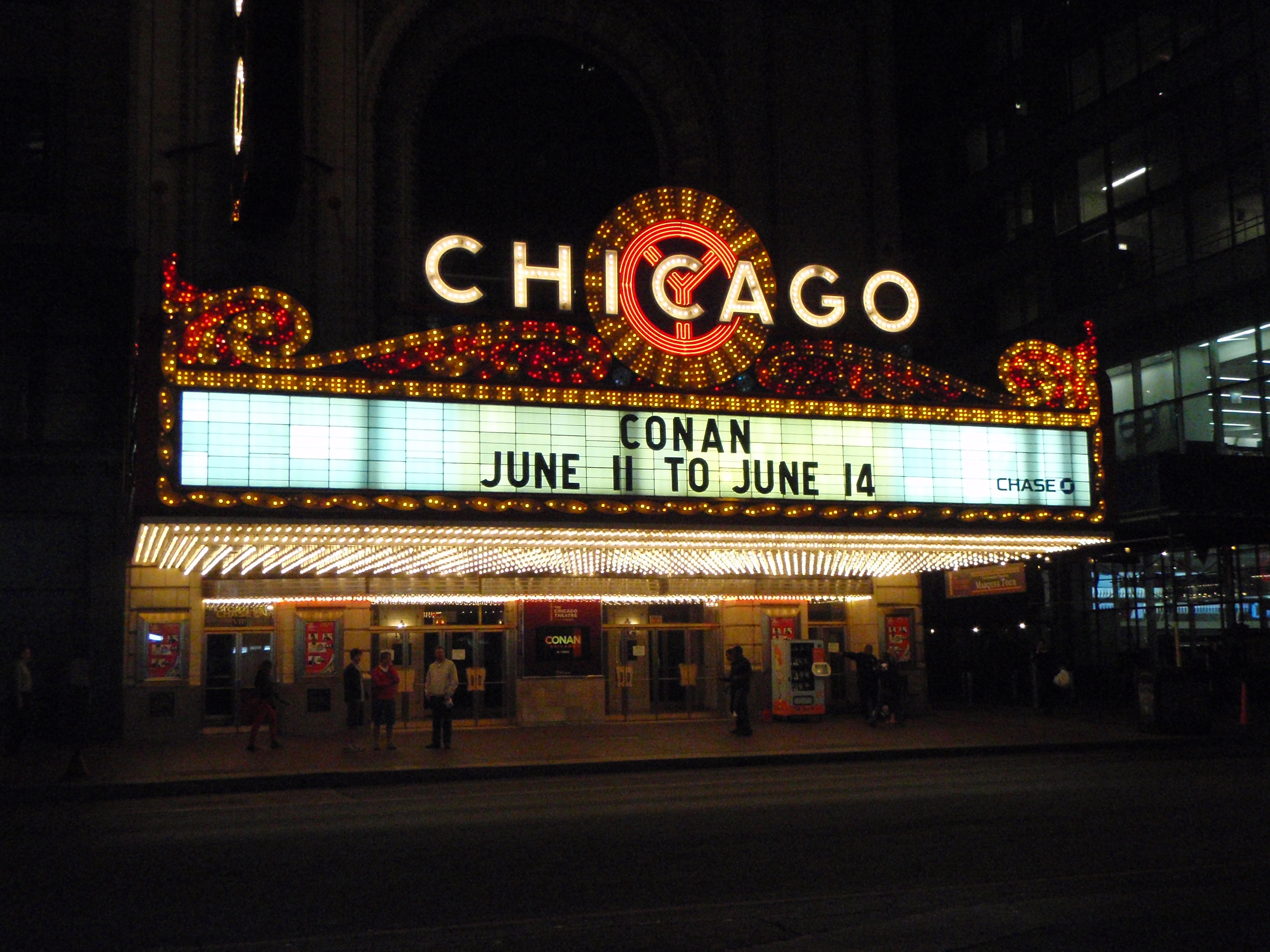
The Chicago Theater, where the show was taped between June 11–14, 2012.

- October 31 – November 3, 2011: taped at the Beacon Theatre in New York City. Guests included Jimmy Fallon, Hugh Jackman, Matthew Broderick and Louis C.K.
- June 11–14, 2012: taped at the Chicago Theatre in Chicago, Illinois, as part of the TBS Just for Laughs Festival. Guests included Jack McBrayer, Andy Samberg, Johnny Galecki and Adam Sandler.
- April 1–4, 2013: taped at The Tabernacle in Atlanta, Georgia, to coincide with the NCAA Final Four being held a few blocks away at the Georgia Dome. Guests included Seth Rogen, Paul Rudd, Steven Yeun and Charles Barkley.
- March 31 – April 3, 2014: taped at the Majestic Theatre in Dallas, Texas, to coincide with the NCAA Final Four. Guests included Dirk Nowitzki, Adam Sandler, Seth Rogen, Simon Helberg and Charles Barkley.
- July 8–11, 2015: taped at the Spreckels Theatre in San Diego, California to coincide with Comic-Con. Guests included Elijah Wood, Jennifer Lawrence, Josh Hutcherson and Peter Capaldi.
- July 20–24, 2016: returned to the Spreckels Theatre in San Diego to coincide with Comic-Con. Guests included the cast of Arrowverse shows, Will Arnett and the cast of Game of Thrones.
- October 31 – November 3, 2016: taped at the Apollo Theater in Harlem.
- July 19–23, 2017: had live shows from the Spreckels Theatre in San Diego to coincide with Comic-Con for the third year in a row. Guests included the casts of Bright, Supernatural, Kingsman: The Golden Circle, The Lego Ninjago Movie and Game of Thrones.
- November 6–9, 2017: taped at the Apollo Theater in Harlem.
- July 18–22, 2018: had live shows from the Spreckels Theatre in San Diego to coincide with Comic-Con for the fourth year in a row. Guests included the casts of Breaking Bad, The Predator, Glass, and Aquaman.
- July 17–20, 2019: returned to the Spreckels Theatre in San Diego to coincide with Comic-Con for the fifth year in a row. Guests included the cast of It: Chapter Two, Tom Cruise, the cast of Veronica Mars and Orlando Bloom and Cara Delevingne from Carnival Row. Mark Hamill, Thomas Middleditch, Jeffrey Dean Morgan, Norman Reedus, Kristen Schaal, Ben Schwartz and Isaac Hempstead Wright appeared in sketches. The Basic Cable Band also returned for these episodes.

=== Conan Without Borders ===
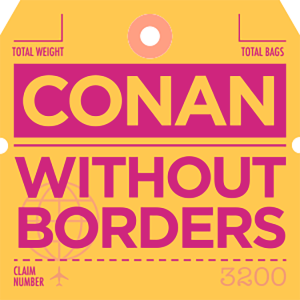
The logo for Conan Without Borders

O'Brien has filmed several specials abroad. These episodes do not follow the traditional talk-show format, instead following O'Brien as he attempts to engage the locals and experience the unique cultural aspects of the area.

The series began in February 2015, following the onset of the Cuban thaw, with O'Brien becoming the first American television personality to film in Cuba for more than half a century. Conan O'Brien then visited Armenia, accompanied by his assistant Sona Movsesian. The series became some of his most popular work, winning an Emmy in 2018. The international shows became available on Netflix before moving to HBO Max.

== History ==
=== TBS announcement ===
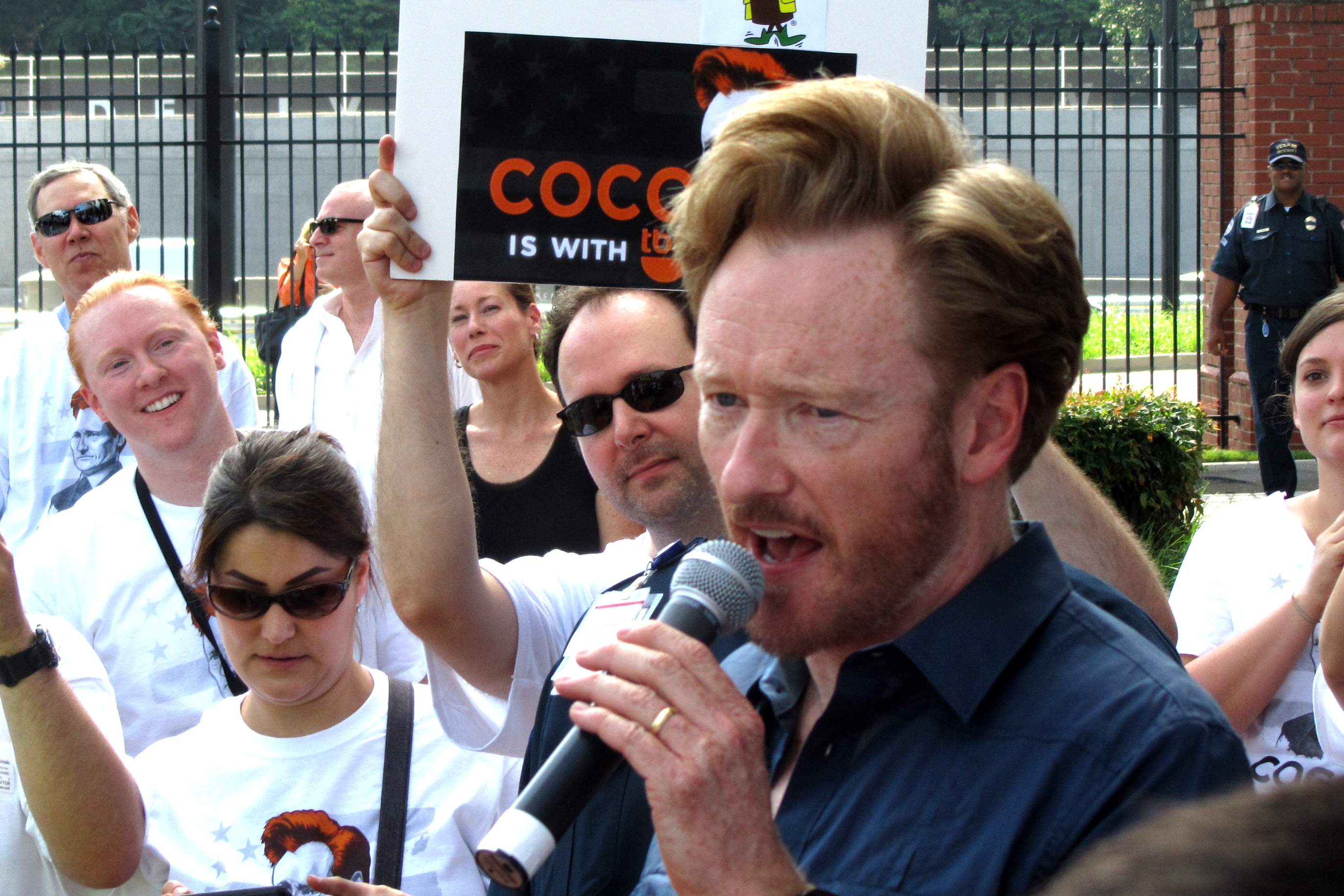
O'Brien at a supporter rally held outside TBS headquarters in Atlanta, Georgia in June 2010

Following the 2010 Tonight Show conflict, O'Brien announced on the first day of The Legally Prohibited from Being Funny on Television Tour that he had signed a deal with cable network TBS to host a talk show on their late-night lineup, beginning in November 2010. Before the deal was announced, O'Brien initially had reservations about the move, as it would place comedian George Lopez's show, Lopez Tonight, one hour later to midnight, effectively doing to Lopez what NBC had wanted to do with O'Brien. However, Lopez reportedly called O'Brien and expressed his excitement about the move. Lopez went on to state, "I can't think of anything better than doing my show with Conan as my lead-in [...] It's the beginning of a new era in late-night comedy." Lopez Tonight would be canceled less than nine months later. In an official press release by Turner Broadcasting, it stated that O'Brien had only begun negotiations a week prior to the official announcement of the show. Steve Koonin, President of Turner Entertainment Networks, went on to comment of the announcement, "Conan has been the comedic voice for a generation. TBS already has a huge audience of young comedy lovers, and Conan's show will give these fans even more reasons to watch our network."

In his own statement about the deal, O'Brien stated, "In three months I've gone from network television to Twitter to performing live in theaters, and now I'm headed to basic cable. My plan is working perfectly." O'Brien's production company, Conaco, reportedly owns all rights to the show. In addition to the announcement of the television series, TBS also announced a one-hour TBS Special, featuring several writers for Conan, as well as comedian Reggie Watts, who participated in O'Brien's Legally Prohibited from Being Funny on Television Tour. The show was broadcast on June 27, 2010, leading up to the beginning of Conan in early-November. Additionally, in preparation for the show, a 24-hour "Live-Coco Cam" was set up on October 20, 2010, and featured various characters and staff members of Conan, including Richie Rosenberg, otherwise known as "LaBamba," as well as a short online broadcast from O'Brien's office entitled "Show Zero" on November 1, 2010. The show featured O'Brien as host, and was accompanied by Andy Richter, as well as Jerry Vivino, a member of the Basic Cable Band. The broadcast hosted several guests, including actor Jim Parsons and indie rock band Steel Train, and lasted a total of four minutes, and 51 seconds.

Weeks before the premiere, an orange Conan blimp was introduced to further promote the show. Designed by Blue Sky, an Atlanta firm, the dirigible provided aerial footage for 2010 Major League Baseball postseason games airing on TBS. It was subsequently incorporated into sketches on Conan, including a running gag where the blimp would follow actor Gary Busey around southern California, much to his chagrin.

=== Series premiere ===
The first episode of Conan, titled "Baa Baa Blackmail", premiered on Monday, November 8, 2010, at 11 p.m. EST on TBS. The episode's first guest was Arlene Wagner, the curator of Leavenworth, Washington's Nutcracker Museum. Wagner's position as Conan's debut guest was chosen by fans through a "rigged" poll at Conan O'Brien's official website, TeamCoco.com. The poll also consisted of Pope Benedict XVI, Russian Prime Minister Vladimir Putin, performers Justin Bieber and Lady Gaga, and actor Jack Nicholson, among others. Wagner's brief appearance was followed by actor and comedian Seth Rogen and actress Lea Michele, along with musical guest Jack White, who performed "Twenty Flight Rock", along with O'Brien himself. Actor Jon Hamm, appearing as his character Don Draper from the AMC series Mad Men, and talk show host Larry King, of CNN's Larry King Live, made cameo appearances in the show's cold open, with actor and comedian Ricky Gervais sending Conan a pre-taped message expressing his well wishes on the new series, then going on to express condolences for future job losses.

Reviews of the premiere episode by television critics were positive, calling it "a looser, quirkier take on a late-night talk show, but still a late-night talk show." James Poniewozik of Time found the episode to be enjoyable, and compared it to O'Brien's tenure during Late Night. Itzkoff went on to state, "The message, overall [...] is that Conan the show is not so much about a reinvention of the talk show form as a restoration of Conan. He was doing something he wanted to do, a late-night talk show, and NBC made him stop doing it." He also praised the opening monologue, and Conan's performance with Jack White during the episode's conclusion. Frazier Moore of Associated Press went on to call the episode "a stylishly back-to-basics hour that radiated hard-won lessons from his brief stay hosting The Tonight Show," in addition to admiring O'Brien's "appealingly stoked yet comfortable" appearance on the show. Ken Tucker of Entertainment Weekly also appreciated the Masturbating Bear cameo, and went on to call the show "pleasant, if a bit underwhelming." Less positive assessments of the show included Tom Gliatto of People, who accused the show of being a "modest, lowkey and slightly awkward affair."

== Ratings ==
Ratings for Conan
Season	Nielsen rank	Total viewers	Tied with
2010–2011	9	0.9	—N/a
2011–2012	9	0.9	—N/a
2012–2013	8	0.9	Last Call with Carson Daly
2013–2014	10	0.8	—N/a
2014–2015	9	0.7	The Nightly Show with Larry Wilmore
2015–2016	—N/a	0.5	—N/a
2016–2017	—N/a	—N/a	—N/a
2017–2018	TBD	TBD	TBD
2018–2019	TBD	TBD	TBD
2019–2020	TBD	TBD	TBD
2020–2021	TBD	0.2	TBD

Despite a promising start, Conan suffered from low viewership throughout its eleven year run. Its series premiere drew 4.1 million viewers according to Nielsen, though it dropped to 2.02 million viewers by its fourth episode. By December 2010, Conan was lagging behind its broadcast competitors in overnight ratings, averaging 1.3 million tune-ins; by June 2011, it was fourth behind its cable competitors as well, averaging 743,000 total viewers. The drop was steep: one year after launching, the show had lost 60% of its total viewership. In August 2011, TBS secured the cable syndication rights to The Big Bang Theory at a reported $2 million per episode to serve as a lead-in to Conan three nights a week, in an effort to boost his ratings. Viewership in 2012 was 914,000, two years later, it had slid to 862,000 viewers.

Halfway through its run, the show became the lowest-rated of all of the major national late-night talk shows: it dropped to 580,000 total viewers in 2015, a 32% decline over its previous year, including a 61% decline in its key demographic, down to 310,000 viewers. By 2017, there was talk of retooling the show to a weekly format; eventually the network agreed to cut the nightly show by half an hour in 2018. In its final season (2020–21), the show averaged 282,000 viewers, representing a total drop of 29% over its last year, and 36% in its main demographic.

The run of Conan coincided with an overall drop in the linear audience, with more people cord-cutting and pursuing streaming options. In contrast to its live audience, Conan boasted strong online revenues with its Team Coco website, attracting a particularly young viewership that TBS leveraged into lucrative advertiser relationships targeting digital and social media. Research indicated Conan had the youngest audience of any of the late-night programs, and by 2018, online videos of the program had collectively attracted 3.4 billion views. Surveys suggested in 2012 that Conan drew more Hispanic viewers than any other late night program; another ranking two years later found the show did well in ratings among low income inner city viewers.

== Production ==
On May 16, 2010, O'Brien announced that his new show would launch at Stage 15 on the Warner Bros. lot in Burbank, California. Taping of each episode began at 4:30 p.m. PST, which usually followed a rehearsal lasting from 1 p.m. until 3 p.m.

At its outset, O'Brien noted the new show's effort not to reuse any of the previous Late Night or Tonight Show sketches, despite the difficulty, and they were unsure if some sketches were going to work. However, O'Brien noted in interviews that he might bring back certain bits in time. Characters and bits that eventually made appearances on Conan included The Masturbating Bear, Triumph the Insult Comic Dog, Celebrity Survey, The Audiency Awards, Clutch Cargo interviews, and an update on the "Late Night" sketch If They Mated called If They Melded. The final day of longtime writer/performer Brian Stack in 2015 also saw the one-time return of one of his characters, The Interrupter.

Prior to the show's airing, O'Brien and Richter indicated that the show would more closely represent Late Night than Tonight in regard to content and material, meaning that edgier or questionable content excised as a result of the move to the earlier time slot will no longer be an issue at TBS. On the July 12, 2010, episode of Marc Maron's WTF podcast, Richter said that they no longer have to "worry about living up to a respected franchise", and that on The Tonight Show certain sketches "that just felt too 12:30" would be cut and how "it'll be nice to not have to worry about that anymore". During an appearance at the 2010 San Francisco Sketch Comedy Festival, O'Brien told the audience he was "no longer interested in 'broadening' the audience or trying to reach everybody of all ages," further implying the content would not be toned-down.

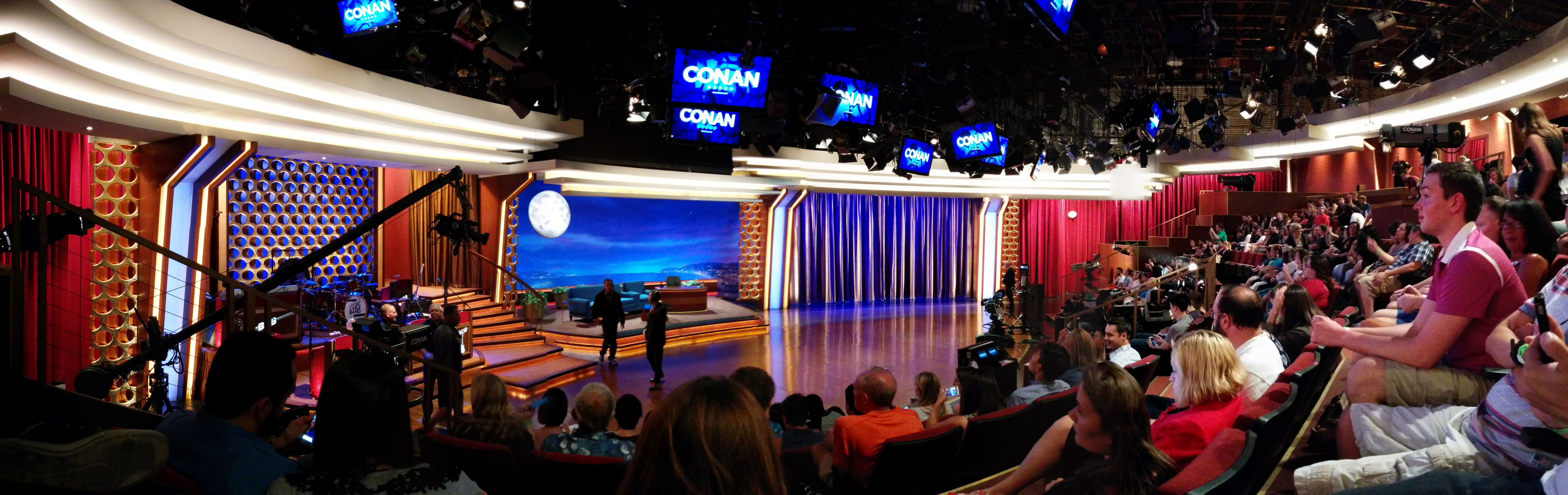

On September 1, 2010, O'Brien announced that the new show's title was simply Conan. Prior to the show's debut, set designers John Shaffner and Joe Stewart, who designed O'Brien's previous sets, cited The Legally Prohibited Tour as inspiration for the new set, adopting more of a "theatre" appearance than the previous shows. Shaffner commented on the choice of the show's chair, stating, "You find one that you like and then you build it yourself to make it a little shallower and a little more upright and the cushion a little firmer [...] But not too firm or every time the guest sits down they'll say, 'Oooh this is a hard chair.'" The rest of the set was described as being "filled with warm wood tones and electric blue screens," and was compared to the set of his most recent stint on The Tonight Show. The new set featured several differences, however, including a remote-controlled moon, and the backdrop being transformed into a giant blue ocean.

In keeping with a change made during The Tonight Show, Richter joined O'Brien during celebrity interviews on the main set rather than remaining behind a lectern after the monologue. In May 2017, TBS renewed the show through 2022. The first show of 2018 saw the debut of a new set by production designer Christopher Goumas, which replaced the ocean backdrop with one depicting a studio backlot reminiscent of the Warner Bros. lot where the program was recorded. O'Brien began entering through a doorway on the left of the stage rather than a curtain on the right. O'Brien explained that the space was also deliberately tighter to promote a more "intimate" atmosphere, and jokingly demonstrated the ability for the set to be moved even closer to the audience on demand.

With the debut of the half-hour format in 2019, a new set was introduced with an even more compact design than before, which Richter jokingly compared to looking like "a strip club from Grand Theft Auto", with the desk area replaced by a series of armchairs around a coffee table. In 2020, during the COVID-19 pandemic in the United States and the associated lockdown, the show relocated to the Largo following several months broadcasting from his home. The show remained at the Largo until the conclusion of the series. On November 17, 2020, O'Brien announced that the show would end after the conclusion of its tenth season, effectively retiring from hosting a late-night show. O'Brien announced that he was moving on to produce a weekly "variety" show on WarnerMedia's streaming service HBO Max. Conan's 75-minute series finale aired on June 24, 2021, and featured highlights from the TBS era, appearances by Homer Simpson and Will Ferrell, Jack Black as the series' final guest, and an extended farewell message from O'Brien.

== Jimmy Vivino and the Basic Cable Band ==
Jimmy Vivino and the Basic Cable Band served as the house band for Conan from the show's debut in 2010 until the end of its hour-long format in 2018. It was fronted by longtime band guitarist Jimmy Vivino. The band also included Richie "LaBamba" Rosenberg on trombone, Scott Healy on keyboard, Mike Merritt on bass guitar, Mark Pender on trumpet, Jerry Vivino on woodwinds, and James Wormworth on drums.

The Basic Cable Band started out as The Max Weinberg 7 on Late Night with Conan O'Brien in 1993, and was initially fronted by longtime E Street Band drummer Max Weinberg. It was renamed The Tonight Show Band with Conan's move to The Tonight Show in 2009. For the length of Conan's 2010 North American tour, the band was called The Legally Prohibited Band, with Weinberg largely absent. Citing recent open heart surgery and a desire to remain on the East Coast, Weinberg officially departed in September 2010. For the launch of Conan, the band was newly christened The Basic Cable Band, with Vivino officially taking over as bandleader.

For Conan, O'Brien sought to revamp the show's title theme song from its previous incarnations. In an interview with New York Magazine, O'Brien expressed his desire to create a new introduction from the previous compositions, which were used for O'Brien's entire 17-year relationship with NBC: "It just felt like the right thing to do [...] There's this feeling of, 'Let's try and build something new.' I came out to that theme for seventeen years and it does feel like, you know what? Let's try some new stuff. Let's try and change it up." The new theme song was co-written by Vivino and O'Brien.

Jimmy Vivino and the Basic Cable Band's final appearance as house band took place on October 4, 2018. However, a smaller version of the band, christened Jimmy Vivino and the Basic Cable Four, returned to serve as the house band for the final two weeks of Conan in 2021.

== Awards and nominations ==
Award nominations for Conan
Year	Award	Category	Result
2011	63rd Primetime Emmy Awards	Outstanding Variety, Music or Comedy Series	Nominated
2011	63rd Primetime Emmy Awards	Outstanding Writing for a Variety, Music or Comedy Series	Nominated
2011	63rd Primetime Emmy Awards	Outstanding Lighting Design/Lighting Direction for a Variety, Music or Comedy Series	Nominated
2011	63rd Primetime Emmy Awards	Outstanding Creative Achievement in Interactive Media	Nominated
2012	64th Primetime Emmy Awards	Outstanding Creative Achievement in Interactive Media	Won
2013	65th Primetime Emmy Awards	Outstanding Interactive Program	Nominated
2013	65th Primetime Emmy Awards	Outstanding Multi-Camera Editing for a Comedy Series	Nominated
2015	67th Primetime Emmy Awards	Outstanding Picture Editing for Variety Programming	Nominated
2016	68th Primetime Emmy Awards	Outstanding Interactive Program	Nominated
2017	69th Primetime Emmy Awards	Outstanding Picture Editing for Variety Programming	Nominated
2018	70th Primetime Emmy Awards	Original Creative Achievement in Interactive Media within an Unscripted Program	Won
2021	73rd Primetime Emmy Awards	Outstanding Variety Talk Series	Nominated

== International syndication ==
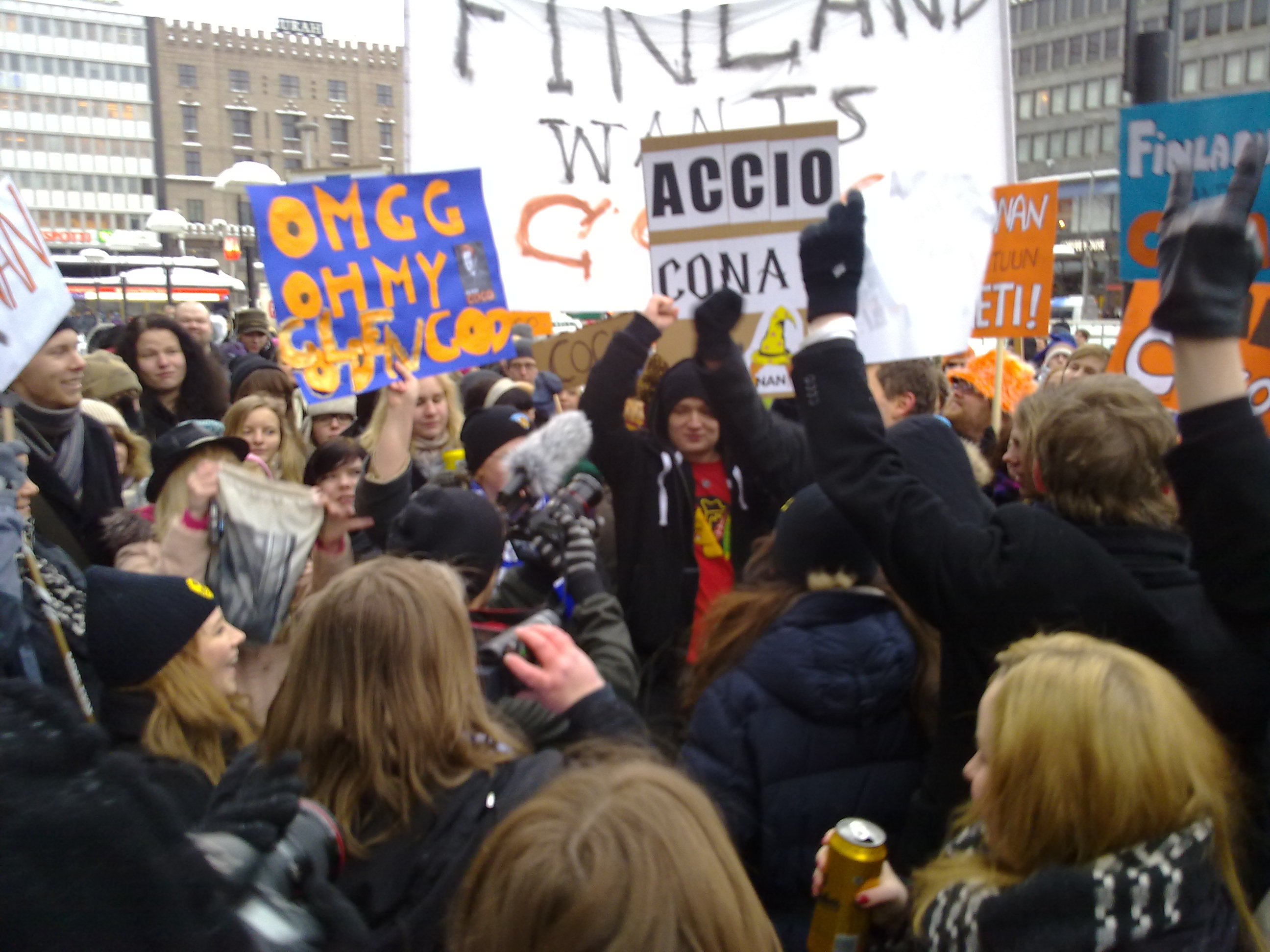
"Finland Wants Conan" demonstrative gathering in Helsinki, Finland. Finnish fans wanted to see Conan's new show air in Finland.

In Australia, the program was aired on GO!, a multichannel of the Nine Network from August 2012 following the 2012 Olympic Games but eventually dropped by GO! mid-2014. Originally it was intended to screen within 12 hours after its original U.S. broadcast at 11:30pm weeknights. The Comedy Channel which aired the previous versions of Conan's shows announced it would not air the program as the Nine Network had exclusive rights to Time Warner programs. Between November 2010 to July 2012, Conan was aired on GEM.

In Israel, the program began airing in early 2011 on the newly launched Comedy Central Israel channel. episodes were aired 4–5 days after their original TBS broadcasts. However, the channel discontinued airing Conan in October 2011.

From November 8, 2010, to August 30, 2013, the program aired in Canada on cable channel The Comedy Network on Monday to Thursday nights (Tuesday to Friday mornings) at midnight ET/PT, with a repeat on broadcast network CTV at 1:07 a.m. local time. The program was only initially announced for CTV, leading to some concern about the unusually late time slot, two hours after its airing in the United States for viewers in the Eastern Time Zone (the program aired on CTV Atlantic at 1:05 a.m. AT / 12:05 a.m. ET). This is due to local and national newscasts in the 11:00 p.m. hour, and CTV's commitments to The Daily Show with Jon Stewart at 12:05 a.m. and The Colbert Report at 12:35 a.m. CTV executives later said the program would likely air earlier on The Comedy Network, which is owned by CTV. However, that channel also had a conflict, since it has long aired both Daily and Colbert during the 11:00 p.m. ET hour, simulcasting the Comedy Central feed.

The Comedy Network then attempted to move up both programs to 10:00 p.m. ET beginning in September 2010, presumably to make room for Conan at 11:00; however, there were intermittent "technical difficulties" with getting the shows in time for the earlier airing, particularly for a series of special live Daily episodes in late October, which meant re-runs were aired in their place. After viewer complaints about the missed episodes, Comedy elected to move both shows back to their previous timeslots, meaning that Conan was rescheduled on that channel to midnight, on a one-hour delay from TBS. On September 3, 2013, Much Music began broadcasting the program every Monday to Thursday at 11 p.m. ET (8 p.m. Pacific), though it was moved back to its time-delayed midnight airing the following month. The repeat on CTV was moved to 1:37 a.m.

On September 3, 2014, the program began airing on Much at 12:30 a.m. after @midnight. On January 9, 2017, Conan began airing at 11 p.m. ET again, only to again be moved back an hour to midnight in April of that same year. Conan aired on Much until September 1, 2017. The program aired solely on CTV until April 2020, when it began airing again on the renamed CTV Comedy Channel at 11:30 after The Daily Show following Comedy Central's cancellation of Lights Out with David Spade. The show was pushed back another 15 minutes to 11:45 after Comedy Central expanded The Daily Show by 15 minutes.

Selling rights to a Canadian channel was necessary, since TBS ceased being available in Canada in October 2007. The local Atlanta station through which Canadian cable subscribers had previously received TBS programming then adopted a distinct schedule as WPCH-TV. Some speculated that WPCH might pick up the program anyway, since the revamped station continues to air some of the same syndicated series as TBS, but WPCH later indicated explicitly that it had no plans to broadcast the new O'Brien program.

In the UK and Ireland, the show aired on the channel truTV since its launch in August 2014, though it has been absent from the schedules as of August 2017.

In Portugal, Conan was retitled Conan O'Brien. The show aired on SIC Radical, in the same timeslot as his previous NBC shows, with daily broadcasts beginning on October 5, 2009. The show aired Monday to Friday beginning around 20h45 to 21h30, following The Daily Show, with occasional reruns interspersed among new shows. New episodes aired about two weeks after the US broadcast. However, since January 2016, SIC Radical stopped airing the show because the show's international distributor has ceased shipping the show outside the USA.

The show aired in Southeast Asia and Hong Kong on FX.

== See also ==
- Television in the United States
