= James Wormworth =

American drummer

James Wormworth is an American drummer and percussionist. He is the son of the jazz drummer Jimmy Wormworth and the brother of bass guitarist Tracy Wormworth.

Wormworth was a member of Jimmy Vivino and the Basic Cable Band on the TBS late night comedy program Conan. Wormworth often appeared as house drummer during the band's run as The Max Weinberg 7 on Late Night with Conan O'Brien. Wormworth joined the band as a full-time member when O'Brien became the host of The Tonight Show with Conan O'Brien.

Wormworth has a strong preference toward playing the drums with his feet completely bare, as exhibited when he wears a full suit with bare feet while playing on television.
