= Mark Pender =

American trumpet player and vocalist (born 1957)

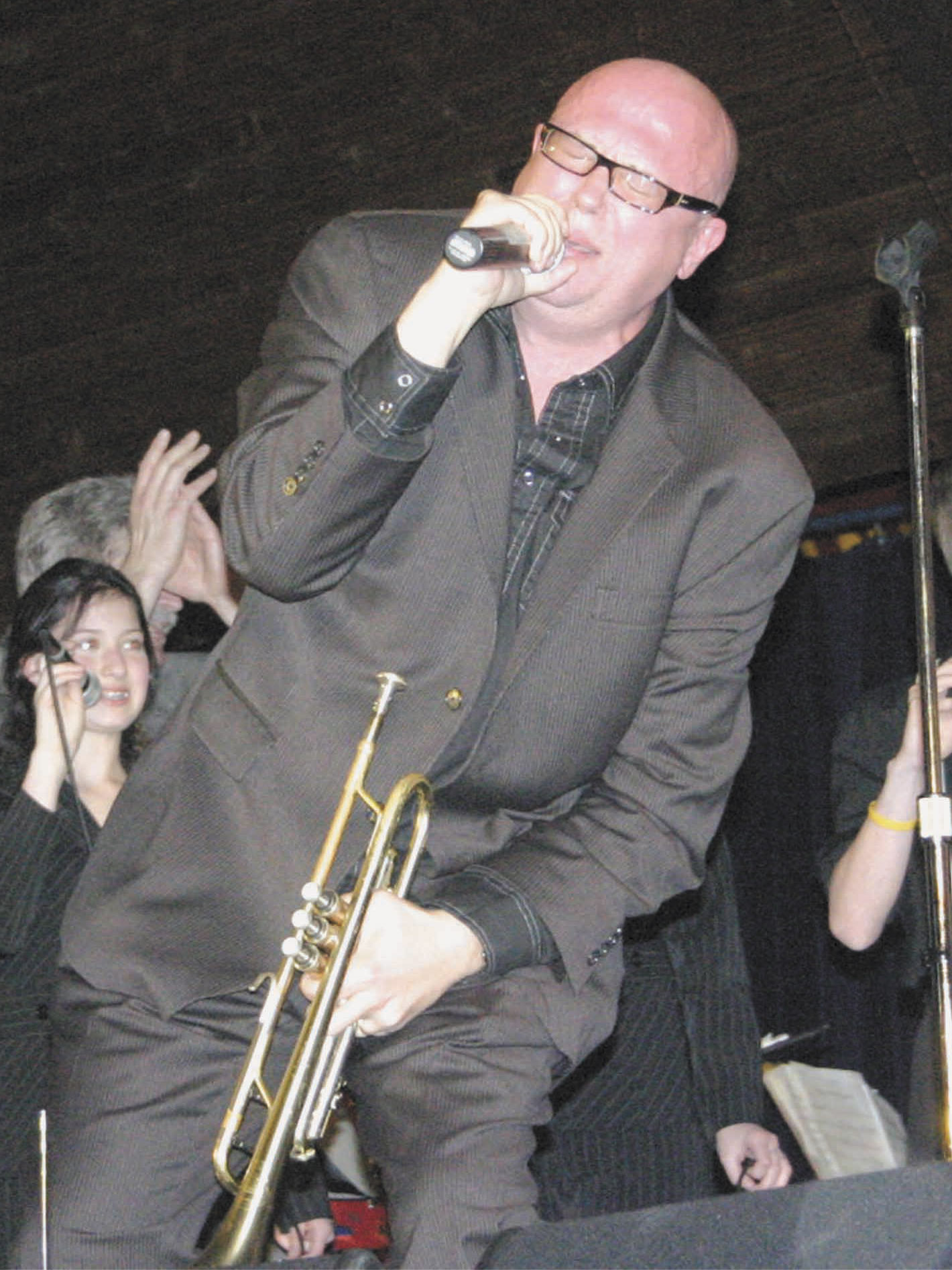
- Mark Pender at the 2006 Pleasant Hill Jazz Festival at Pleasant Hill High School in Pleasant Hill, Oregon.

Background information
- Also known as: The Loveman
- Born: Mark Pender; August 21, 1957 (age 68)
- Origin: Kansas City, Missouri, U.S.
- Genres: Jazz, rock, soul
- Occupations: Trumpeter, singer, songwriter
- Instruments: Trumpet, vocals, guitar

Mark "The Loveman" Pender (born August 21, 1957) is an American trumpet player and vocalist who has played with Southside Johnny, Little Steven and Bruce Springsteen. Since 1993, he has performed on Late Night with Conan O'Brien and The Tonight Show with Conan O'Brien as a member of The Max Weinberg 7 and The Tonight Show Band. He formerly performed on Conan as a member of the Basic Cable Band from 2010 to 2018. He is a member of The Miami Horns, leads his own band, The Mark Pender Band, and plays regularly with La Bamba & The Hubcaps.

As a member of The Miami Horns he has toured and/or recorded with, among others Diana Ross, Gary U.S. Bonds, Joe Cocker, Darlene Love, Robert Cray and Bon Jovi. As an individual he has had sessions with David Bowie, They Might Be Giants, Buster Poindexter and Blackmore's Night.

== History ==
Mark Pender graduated in 1975 from Grandview Senior High School in Grandview, Missouri. In the mid-1970s, while still in Kansas City, Pender played with Mass Transit and saxophonist Stephen Harvey. This band played a fusion of R&B, jazz and disco. He also played with the Inner City Orchestra from 1977 until 1979. This gave him the opportunity to play with the likes of Jay McShann, Joe Turner, Ella Fitzgerald and Gladys Knight & the Pips. He would also occasionally front the band on trumpet and vocals. Pender and Harvey also played regularly at the Mutual Musicians Foundation. It was there they first met the jazz organist Charles Earland. In 1979, Pender and Harvey accepted Earlands offer to join his touring band. The tour finished in Newark, New Jersey. Pender opted to stay while Harvey returned to Kansas City where he was murdered on November 5, 1980.

Once in New Jersey, Pender linked up with The Miami Horns and toured with Diana Ross between 1980 and 1981. He was invited to join Little Steven & The Disciples Of Soul and while on tour with them in Paris, he met his current wife Francoise while still married to Connie his first wife whom he married in Ft. Lee, New Jersey. Connie and Mark were married from 1982–1992.

Little Steven nicknamed him The Love Man. Pender subsequently became a member of Southside Johnny & The Asbury Jukes and led The Jukes' Horns on the albums Trash It Up, In The Heat and At Least We Got Shoes. In 1988, as part of the group The Tunnel Of Love Horns, he went on tour with Bruce Springsteen. Pender continues to record with both Southside Johnny and Springsteen and featured on the latter's 2005 album Devils & Dust. He also played in the halftime show for NFL's Super Bowl XLIII.

Pender also continues to play regularly with La Bamba & The Hubcaps, led by friend Richie "La Bamba" Rosenberg. This band recorded an eponymous album in 1991 which gave Pender the chance to showcase his skills as a lead vocalist. He also linked up Max Weinberg in the band Killer Joe. This band recorded one album, Scene Of The Crime, which featured Pender playing trumpet and singing lead vocal on a rousing rendition of "Chicken Shack Boogie." He also fronts The Mark Pender Band, playing a blend of R&B, jazz and funk, a reflection of his Kansas City roots. This band has featured both Rosenberg and Harrison in its line-up. In 2003, he independently released an eponymous CD/DVD package featuring live and studio recordings. Pender currently tours with They Might Be Giants.
