= Scott Healy =

- Genres: Jazz, rock and roll, blues, R&B
- Instruments: Piano, keyboard
- Years active: 1993–present
- Website: http://www.bluedogmusic.com

Scott Healy is an American pianist, keyboardist and composer best known as the keyboardist for Conan O'Brien. He was the keyboard player for the Jimmy Vivino and the Basic Cable Band on Conan on TBS. His association with O'Brien dates back to the original Late Night with Conan O'Brien show in 1993, and the subsequent The Tonight Show with Conan O'Brien. He was nominated for a Grammy for 'Best Instrumental Composition' for 'Koko On The Boulevard'

== Early life ==
Healy was raised in Cleveland, Ohio and is an alumnus of Hawken School. As a teenager Healy studied with the renowned piano teacher James Tannenbaum at The Cleveland Institute of Music. Following this, Healy attended the Eastman School of Music where he graduated with a degree in composition and piano. While there he studied with Samuel Adler, Joseph Schwantner, Rayburn Wright and Warren Benson.

== Career ==
Healy is active on both coasts as a jazz and rock keyboardist, a session pianist, organist and accordionist, and a composer, arranger and producer. His performing and recording credits include many of the greats in rock, blues, R&B and jazz, including Bruce Springsteen, Bonnie Raitt, Al Green, B. B. King, Jackson Browne, Levon Helm, Son Seals, Hubert Sumlin, Max Weinberg, Branford Marsalis, and Tony Bennett. Healy also scores feature films, produces records, and leads his ten-piece jazz group, The Scott Healy Ensemble, and various contemporary music composing projects and commissions. His composing and arranging credits include the Portland Maine Symphony Orchestra, the Aspen Contemporary Ensemble, and the Mel Lewis Orchestra, as well as recording artists Ricky Martin and Christina Aguilera.

In 2012, Healy, in conjunction with guitarist Glenn Alexander, released their album Northern Light as the Scott Healy-Glenn Alexander Quartet, a project the pair started in 1991. Alexander attributed the renewed enthusiasm for finishing the album to positive reception from students in his class at Sarah Lawrence College.

In early 2013 he released his second large ensemble record, Hudson City Suite by The Scott Healy Ensemble, which features Tim Hagans on trumpet, Scott on piano, and an eleven-piece ensemble.

His monthly column, "Session Sensei" appeared in Keyboard Magazine for over five years and provided real world advice on performing, studio work, the music business and professional life in general. In addition he wrote many feature articles on artists and bands, as well as lessons on rock, jazz and blues piano and organ for Keyboard. His jazz composition blog, professorscosco, deals with advanced topics in music theory, arranging and orchestration. In the 1980s he taught at the New School for Social Research in New York City, and was an associate professor at Sarah Lawrence College in Bronxville, NY from 1990 through 2001.

== Recognition ==
He was nominated for a Grammy for 'Best Instrumental Composition' for 'Koko On The Boulevard'. He has received awards from BMI, The National Endowment for the Arts, and the "Distinguished Artist" award from the New Jersey State Council on the Arts.
