= Jimmy Vivino and the Basic Cable Band =

Former house band for Conan O'Brien

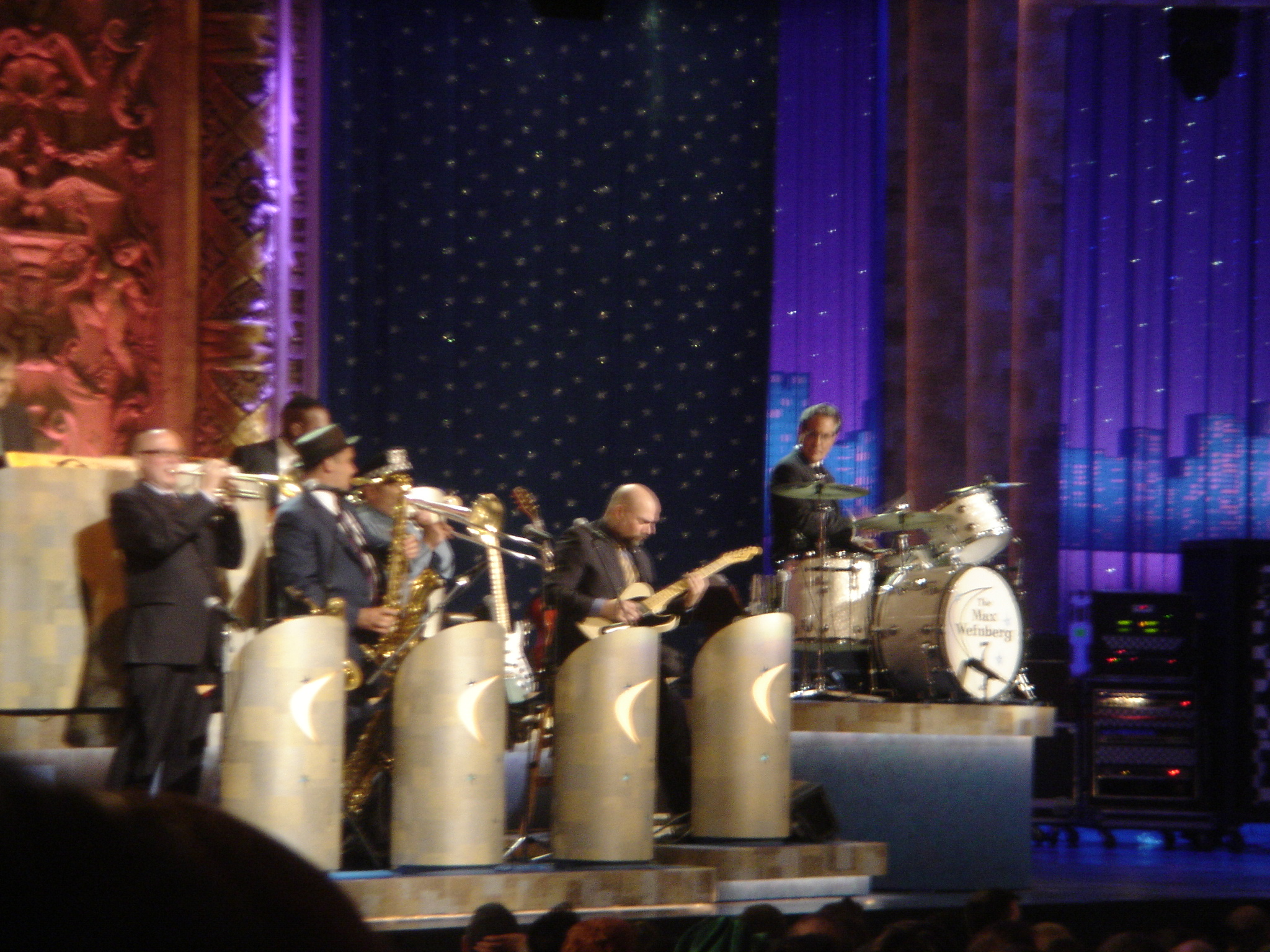
- The band during a taping of Late Night with Conan O'Brien in 2006

Background information
- Origin: New York, New York, U.S.
- Occupations: House band
- Years active: 1993–2009, 2025 (as The Max Weinberg 7); 2009–2010 (as the Tonight Show Band); 2010 (as The Legally Prohibited Band); 2010–2018, 2019 (as The Basic Cable Band); 2021 (as The Basic Cable Four)
- Label: Hip-O (as The Max Weinberg 7)
- Past members: Jimmy Vivino; Richie "LaBamba" Rosenberg; Mark Pender; Jerry Vivino; Scott Healy; Mike Merritt; James Wormworth; Max Weinberg

Jimmy Vivino and the Basic Cable Band was the house band for Conan O'Brien's late-night talk show Conan from its debut on November 8, 2010 to the final episode of its 60-minute format October 4, 2018. Guitarist and arranger Jimmy Vivino was the group's leader. The group was originally formed and led by drummer Max Weinberg in 1993, and played under the name The Max Weinberg 7 when it was the house band for Late Night with Conan O'Brien in New York through 2009. The band then played under Max Weinberg and The Tonight Show Band during their brief 2009–2010 stint on The Tonight Show with Conan O'Brien in Los Angeles. They were then briefly known as The Legally Prohibited Band during their participation with O'Brien in the 2010 The Legally Prohibited from Being Funny on Television Tour.

During the Late Night days, the band included Jimmy Vivino on guitar, Richie "LaBamba" Rosenberg on trombone, Scott Healy on keyboard, Mike Merritt on bass guitar, Mark "Love Man" Pender on trumpet and acoustic guitar, and Jimmy's older brother Jerry Vivino on woodwinds. When the group moved to Los Angeles to become The Tonight Show Band, they added an eighth member, James Wormworth, on percussion. Wormworth had often substituted as drummer when Weinberg toured with Bruce Springsteen as a member of the E Street Band, prior to being made a permanent fixture in the band; Jimmy Vivino had served as the band's leader during those periods. Weinberg did not participate in the Legally Prohibited Tour and his departure from the group and from O'Brien was made official in September 2010.

The band's final regular appearance on Conan was on the show's last hour-long episode on October 4, 2018. With the show switching to a half-hour format, it was announced the band would not be returning in 2019. They appeared on four special episodes recorded at San Diego Comic-Con that year, and the final eight episodes of the program in 2021 as Jimmy Vivino and the Basic Cable Four. The original band members reunited, as The Max Weinberg 7, in 2025 for Conan O'Brien: The Kennedy Center Mark Twain Prize for American Humor.

== History ==
=== The Max Weinberg 7 ===
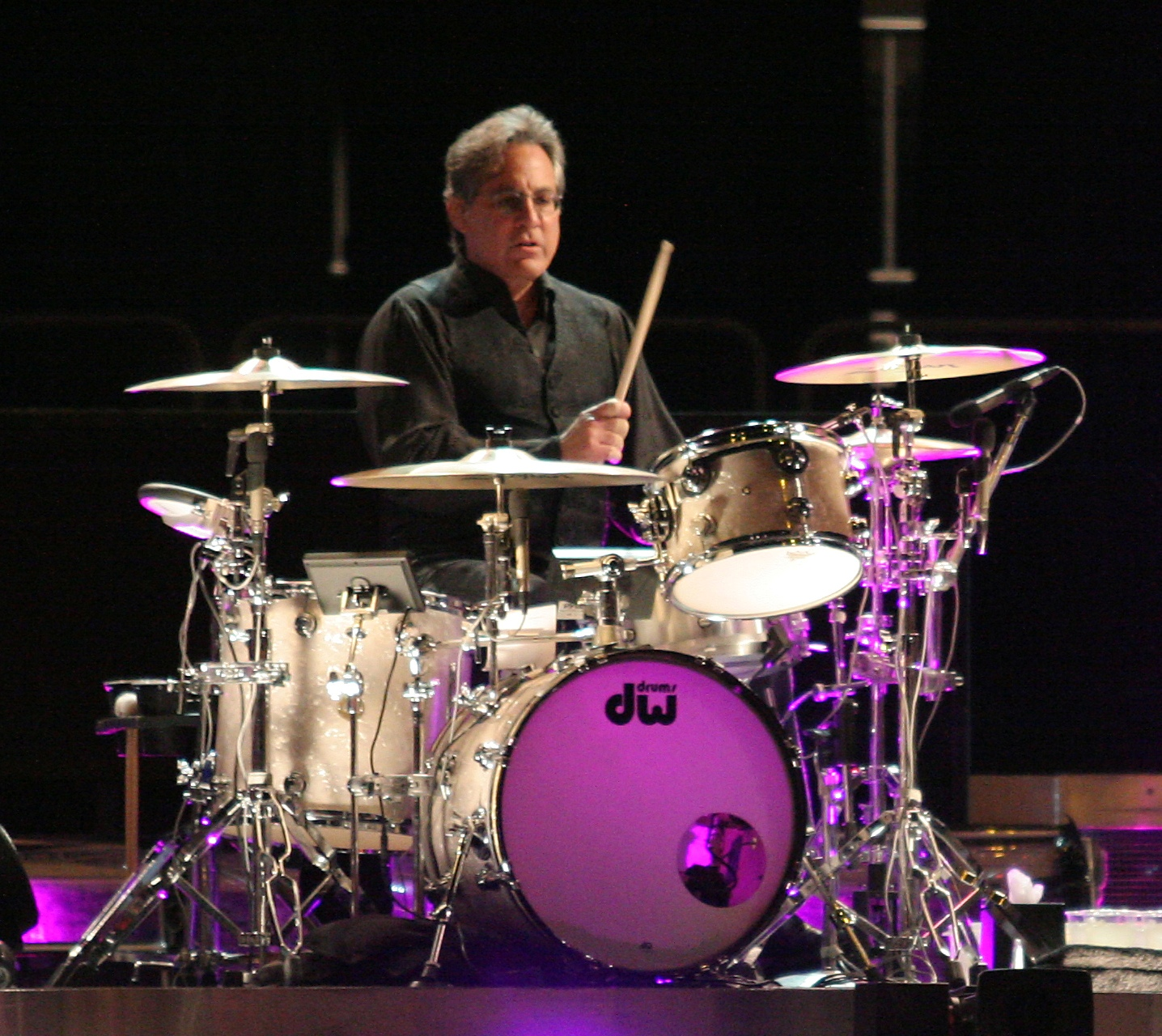
Max Weinberg was bandleader from 1993 to 2010.

Max Weinberg was the drummer for Bruce Springsteen as a member of the E Street Band until its dissolution in 1989. Weinberg returned to college to finish his communications degree and contemplated law school, but soon desired to resume drumming. He auditioned to be the principal drummer for the Broadway show Tommy, but was selected as the second substitute. That night, Weinberg had a chance sidewalk meeting outside the Carnegie Deli with newly selected Late Night host Conan O'Brien, where Weinberg spoke about his ideas for music on the show. O'Brien agreed to give Weinberg an audition as bandleader for his forthcoming show. Weinberg quickly put together The Max Weinberg 7, recruiting musicians he had worked with during his career, and got the job.

Rosenberg and Pender had played with The Miami Horns, and had a long joint history with Weinberg from touring or recording together with Springsteen, Southside Johnny, Little Steven, Gary U.S. Bonds, and Darlene Love. In the early 1990s Weinberg and Pender were also in a band together called Killer Joe, which also featured Jimmy and Jerry Vivino. The Vivino brothers were experienced New York session musicians and had been members of various Broadway pit bands. They recruited the final two members of the band, Scott Healy and Mike Merritt, who had played together in various bands such as Jimmy Vivino & The Black Italians and The Vivino Brothers Band. Fill-in James Wormworth was also a member of the Vivino bands, but was initially left out of the ensemble because there was no need for two drummers.

Members of the band have participated in skits on Late Night, particularly fedoraed LaBamba—who rarely speaks on air and is often the punchline of O'Brien's jokes—and bald, bespectacled Mark Pender, who will often sing a tribute to one of the show's guests only to invariably launch into hysterical shrieking as he climbs the scaffolding of the studio's seating area. Pender was also told by O'Brien to imitate soccer player Zinedine Zidane's famous World Cup headbutt due to both Pender and Zidane's lack of hair. O'Brien would tease Wormworth because he drummed barefoot.

Weinberg was often involved in short, awkward, and/or humorous banter with O'Brien. O'Brien often made jokes about Weinberg's supposedly perverse sexual habits. Rosenberg is often the butt of jokes for both his healthy sized mustache and his often awkward demeanor on air, and his sexual orientation is occasionally questioned by O'Brien through monologue jokes and other comedy bits. O'Brien often has Rosenberg participate in potentially humiliating skits, such as dressing up his mustache in Christmas lights, or shaving it off. Additionally, Rosenberg provided the falsetto interludes for the formerly regular skits "In the Year 2000" and "In the Year 3000". A noted incident of ridicule occurred in 2007 when the camera, which had unexpectedly cut to the band for a reaction shot, caught LaBamba consulting his sheet music with a somewhat puzzled look on his face. This caused O'Brien to draw attention to Rosenberg's goof, and to claim that LaBamba could not read music. The others are rarely used in sketches, although Mike Merritt takes part in sketches where O'Brien talks about race, to which Merritt's supposed thoughts are used in a voice-over where he ridicules O'Brien's lack of knowledge about African-American culture and O'Brien's own "abnormally" pale complexion.

The show often features a performance by a musical guest (a band or a solo artist) at the end, and some or even all members of The Max Weinberg 7 perform as backup musicians for the guests when needed, such as Weinberg performing the drums for the last half of the Death from Above 1979 song, "Romantic Rights" while singer and drummer Sebastien Grainger stands on the bass drum.

Weinberg has, in the past, taken long leaves of absence to tour with the E Street Band. During his absences, he has typically been replaced by James Wormworth, and the band is led by Jimmy Vivino, then referred to as "Jimmy Vivino and The Max Weinberg 7".

The band plays an eclectic selection of music on the show, including frequent performances of songs by The Clash, one of O'Brien's favorite bands. Examples of songs by The Clash performed by the group include "Police on my Back", "The Magnificent Seven", "Rock the Casbah", "Spanish Bombs" and "Train in Vain".

The band will often play a song to match a holiday or event ("My Funny Valentine" on Valentine's Day), or sometimes play a song that is irrelevant to the event, causing O'Brien to question their choice of song ("Paint It Black" during Christmas).

The band's song "R.C.4" featured in the film Bewitched (2005).

Members of the band performed with Bruce Springsteen and the E Street Band at Super Bowl XLIII.

=== Max Weinberg and The Tonight Show Band ===
When O'Brien relocated to Los Angeles to become host of The Tonight Show, The Max Weinberg 7 relocated with him, and added an eighth member, James Wormworth, on percussion. Jimmy Vivino and Weinberg reworked the Late Night theme into a "less manic" The Tonight Show theme. The backdrop used for the bandstand depicts the Empire State Building and the Chrysler Building set within a Los Angeles skyline, in recognition of the Late Night roots.

As part of his preparation for the move, Weinberg consulted with Doc Severinsen, the Tonight Show band leader during the Johnny Carson days.

As was the case on Late Night, Weinberg temporarily left the Tonight Show on occasion to tour with Bruce Springsteen and the E Street Band. Jimmy Vivino took over as bandleader in this instance, and Wormworth moved over to drums. Ronnie Gutierrez was also brought in to cover for Wormworth on percussion. In the open, announcer Andy Richter referred to the group as "The Tonight Show Band", and the graphic was changed to acknowledge Weinberg's absence.

Also, as a result, a skit was born that whenever Weinberg appears on his last show before leaving, O'Brien would note that Weinberg deserves a 'proper send-off' and the band would start playing, as suddenly his pedestal would begin to drive itself outside the studio with Weinberg still playing. The pod would then move into the streets of Los Angeles where usually something absurd would happen such as Weinberg being pulled over or hit by a speeding truck.

The band left The Tonight Show along with O'Brien after O'Brien's last show as host, which aired January 22, 2010.

=== The Legally Prohibited Band ===
In April 2010, Conan O'Brien began his The Legally Prohibited from Being Funny on Television Tour. While the rest of the group was part of the tour under the moniker The Legally Prohibited Band, Weinberg was not, though he did appear at the tour's New York stop. Weinberg later revealed that he had undergone complex open heart valve repair surgery two weeks after the conclusion of The Tonight Show and had taken three months to recover from it.

=== Jimmy Vivino and the Basic Cable Band ===
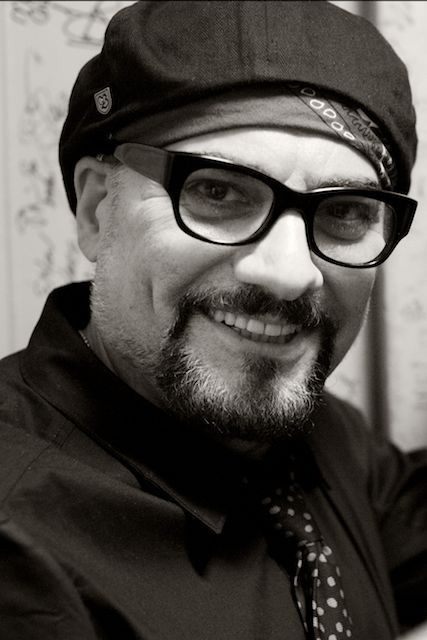
Jimmy Vivino was bandleader from 2010 until the group disbanded in 2018.

In September 2010, Vivino told an interviewer for the St. Louis Riverfront Times that Weinberg would not be part of the new late night show on TBS, now named Conan. Jimmy Vivino was now the leader of the band, with Wormworth full-time on drums, and the band was firmly ensconced in Los Angeles as a base. Upon announcing Weinberg's split from O'Brien in September 2010, O'Brien said, "Max has been a huge part of my life for the past 17 years and he is an incredible band leader and musician." Weinberg said, "my association with Conan, his staff, and crew has been a deeply rewarding experience for me. And, making music with Jimmy Vivino, Mark Pender, La Bamba, Scott Healy, Mike Merritt, and percussionist James Wormworth enabled me to become a better musician and bandleader. I thank them for their first-rate work on the bandstand. I wish Conan and his show the best and I do look forward to dropping by." Both looked forward to Weinberg occasionally stopping by to sit in on the new show. Weinberg said his health was better than ever but that the "life-changing experience emotionally and spiritually" of the surgery and a desire to remain in New Jersey with his family had played a chief role in his departure from the band and O'Brien.

On October 19, 2010, it was announced that the new band name for the Conan show would be Jimmy Vivino and the Basic Cable Band.

Weinberg made a cameo appearance in a monologue bit on the October 28, 2014 episode of Conan, briefly "filling in" on drums for regular drummer Wormworth, who had "gone missing" in the middle of the episode.

On October 4, 2018, with the announcement of the show’s switch to a half-hour format, it was announced that The Basic Cable Band would no longer appear regularly on the program. Members did reunite for four special episodes at San Diego Comic-Con in July 2019, and for the show's final eight episodes (as Jimmy Vivino and the Basic Cable Four) in June 2021.

== Discography ==
Albums

- The Max Weinberg 7 (Hip-O Records, 2000)

== Members ==
Final lineup:

- Jimmy Vivino – bandleader, musical director, guitar, arrangements, vocals
- Scott Healy – keyboards, occasional guitar
- Mike Merritt – bass guitar
- Mark Pender – trumpet, acoustic guitar, vocals
- Richie "LaBamba" Rosenberg – trombone, percussion, vocals
- Jerry Vivino – saxophones, flute, clarinet
- James Wormworth – drums, percussion

Past members:

- Max Weinberg – drums, bandleader
- Ronnie Gutierrez – fill-in percussion
