= Jerry Vivino =

American musician (born 1954)

- Born: January 8, 1954 (age 72); Paterson, New Jersey, U.S.
- Genres: Rock and roll, jazz, R&B
- Occupation: Musician
- Instruments: Saxophone, woodwinds and vocals
- Years active: 1994—present
- Formerly of: Jimmy Vivino and the Basic Cable Band, Max Weinberg and The Tonight Show Band, The Max Weinberg 7, The Vivino Brothers

Jerry Vivino (born January 8, 1954) is an American musician.

== Biography ==
He was a member of the Basic Cable Band, the house band for the TBS late night program Conan. He was also a member of The Tonight Show Band, the house band on The Tonight Show with Conan O'Brien and its predecessor, Late Night with Conan O'Brien on NBC.

Raised in Glen Rock, New Jersey, Vivino graduated in 1972 from Glen Rock High School.

Vivino provides saxophone, woodwinds and vocals. Jerry Vivino has three children, Donna Vivino, Michael J. Vivino, and Danny Vivino.

== Personal ==
Vivino is the younger brother of longtime New Jersey TV host Floyd Vivino, a.k.a. Uncle Floyd, and the older brother of Max Weinberg 7 bandmate Jimmy Vivino, the former band leader of the Basic Cable Band. His daughter, Donna, is a theatre actress and singer.
