= Jimmy Vivino =

American guitarist, keyboard player and singer (born 1955)

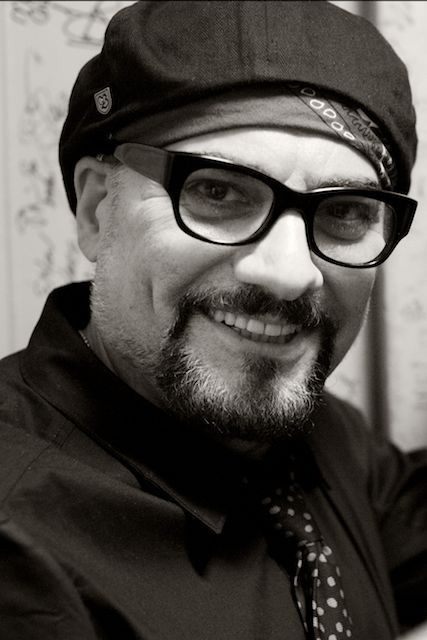
- Vivino at the Beacon, December 2013.

Background information
- Also known as: Jimmy V
- Born: James Vivino; January 10, 1955 (age 71); Paterson, New Jersey, United States
- Origin: Burbank, California
- Genres: Rock and roll, jazz, R&B
- Occupations: Musician; record producer; music director; bandleader
- Instruments: Vocals, guitar, keyboards, trumpet
- Member of: The Fab Faux; Canned Heat
- Formerly of: Jimmy Vivino and the Basic Cable Band
- Relatives: Jerry Vivino (brother); Floyd Vivino (brother)
- Website: https://jimmyvmusic.com

Jimmy Vivino (born January 10, 1955) is an American guitarist, keyboard player, singer, producer, and music director. He is best known as the leader of Jimmy Vivino and the Basic Cable Band, the house band for the TBS late night program Conan. He was also a member of the Tonight Show Band, the house band on The Tonight Show with Conan O'Brien and its predecessor, Late Night with Conan O'Brien on NBC. Vivino has also played with many rock bands, including being a member of Beatles tribute band The Fab Faux.

== Biography ==
Born in Paterson, New Jersey, on January 10, 1955, Vivino grew up in Glen Rock, New Jersey. He is the younger brother of TV and stage performer "Uncle" Floyd Vivino (1951–2026) and Basic Cable Band bandmate Jerry Vivino (born 1954). He attended Glen Rock High School where he played Tevye in a production of Fiddler on the Roof. He had an interest in music from a young age. He began working in New York clubs in the early 1980s, and, in 1985, he was musical director of the play Leader of the Pack. Vivino later said the experience of working on the play "left [him] with kind of a bad taste." In the 90s, he led "Jimmy Vivino and the Black Italians", and worked with Al Kooper. Kooper considered Vivino to be one of his "discoveries" and had him as musical director for fifteen years.

Vivino served as the music director on the TBS late-night program Conan. Vivino was a consistent element in O'Brien's late night career, starting with the first episode of Late Night with Conan O'Brien in September 1993. In June 2008, Vivino moved from New York to Los Angeles and worked as music director/guitarist/arranger on The Tonight Show with Conan O'Brien, The Legally Prohibited from Being Funny on Television Tour, and until 2018, lead Jimmy Vivino and the Basic Cable Band on Conan.

Vivino divides his time between recording sessions and live gigs throughout the country. In addition to his solo work, Vivino plays with the successful Beatles tribute band The Fab Faux. Vivino has also recorded and played live with such legends as Johnnie Johnson, Hubert Sumlin, Levon Helm, and Al Kooper. Earlier in his career, Vivino got his start producing, playing, and arranging for such artists as Phoebe Snow, Laura Nyro, John Sebastian, and Donald Fagen.

Since 2019, Vivino has been a current member of the long-running blues band Canned Heat.

== Partial discography ==
- Gonna B 2 of Those Days (2025)
- 13 Live (2013)
- Novemberin' – Shuggie Otis (Guitar) (2008)
- Live at Lucille's – Michael Packer Blues Band (Guitar) (2007)
- Live at Sweet Rhythm – Michael Packer Blues Band (Guitar) (2007)
- Mule-A-Go-Go – Govt. Mule (New Year's Eve 2005–2006) (Special Guest) (2006)
- Alone Together – Mike Merritt (Guitar) (2005)
- Steaks & Chops: Live at Great Jones, Volume 1 (Guitar) (2005)
- Blues in the Blood – Big Bill Morganfield (Guitar, Mandolin, Organ, Piano, Producer) (2003)
- Best of M.C. Records 1996–2002 (Guitar) (2003)
- Remedy (Vocals) (2002)
- Different Shade of Red: The Woodstock Sessions – Louisiana Red (Organ, Guitar, Mandolin, Director, Producer, Horn Arrangement) (2002)
- Crazy Kind of Life – Bill Perry (Organ, Guitar, Piano, Vocals, Producer) (2002)
- Respond, Volume II (Guitar) (2002)
- Live at Manny's Car Wash – Rhett Tyler (Guitar) (2001)
- Rare & Well Done: The Greatest and the Most Obscure Recordings – Al Kooper (position?) (2001)
- No Small Wonder – Liz Quelar (Electric Guitar) (2001)
- Fire It Up – Bill Perry (2001) (Co-producer/Guest Instrumentalist)
- Do What, Now? (1997)
- Chitlins Parmigiana – The Vivino Brothers (Guitar/Composer) (1992)
- Laura: Live at the Bottom Line – Laura Nyro (Guitar/Mandolin/Vocals/Co-producer) (1989)

== Filmography ==
=== Crew ===
- The Green Room with Jimmy Vivino (2022) (Host)
- Messengers (2004) (Music Producer)
- The First Wives Club (1996) (Orchestrator)
- Stuart Saves His Family (1995) (Additional Orchestrator)
- Boys on the Side (1995) (Production Music Producer)
- Sister Act 2: Back in the Habit (1993) (Assistant Music Supervisor)
- Late Night with Conan O'Brien (1993–2009) (assistant musical director, bandmate, ending theme composer)
- Sister Act (1992) (Music Coordinator/Orchestrator: score)
- Legendary Ladies of Rock & Roll Television (1988) (musical director)

=== Composer ===
- 50 Years of NBC Late Night (2001)

=== Himself ===
- Conan (2010–2021)
- The Tonight Show with Conan O'Brien (2009–2010)
- Late Night with Conan O'Brien (1993–2009)
- Comic Relief VIII (1998)
- Déjà View: The Cinemax Session With James Brown, Aretha Franklin and Wilson Pickett
- Legendary Ladies of Rock and Roll
- The Uncle Floyd Show

== See also ==
- Late Night with Conan O'Brien
- Jimmy Vivino and the Basic Cable Band
- The Tonight Show with Conan O'Brien
- Conan
