= List of The Tonight Show with Conan O'Brien episodes =

This is the list of episodes for The Tonight Show with Conan O'Brien airing from June 1, 2009, to January 22, 2010.

== 2009 ==
=== June ===
No.	Original release date	Guest(s)	Musical/entertainment guest(s)
1	June 1, 2009	Will Ferrell	Pearl Jam ("Got Some")
Move to LA, Greetings from Hillary Clinton, the letter "D" from the Hollywood Sign, Universal Studios tour tram, Conan's Ford Taurus
2	June 2, 2009	Tom Hanks	Green Day ("Know Your Enemy")
Brian Williams' interview with Barack Obama, Twitter Tracker, Shopping spree on Rodeo Road, Tom Hanks gets hit with low flying meteor
3	June 3, 2009	Julia Louis-Dreyfus, Bradley Cooper	Sheryl Crow ("Run Baby Run")
Moral Outrage, Kareem Abdul-Jabbar and Pierre Bernard make entrance through tunnel, In the Year 2000/3000, Jack McBrayer appears as his 30 Rock character Kenneth Parcell
4	June 4, 2009	Gwyneth Paltrow, Joel McHale	John Mayer Trio ("California Dreamin'")
Conan at the Foley stage, Glen Campbell's mugshot, Conan's Tabloid Moment
5	June 5, 2009	Ryan Seacrest, Patton Oswalt	Chickenfoot ("Oh Yeah")
Tonight Show Traffic-copter, Conan's Super Mario Bros. backdrop, all the children born during Late Night with Conan O'Brien, Celebrity Survey
6	June 8, 2009	David Duchovny, Anna Friel	Bill Burr
Conan and Andy go canoeing, Trull Busters!, Noches de Pasion con Señor O'Brien
7	June 9, 2009	Eddie Murphy, Angela Kinsey	Bonnie Raitt & Taj Mahal ("She Caught the Katy")
Conan at the focus group, Twitter Tracker
8	June 10, 2009	Dane Cook, Steven Ho	Rancid ("Last One to Die")
FiatChrysler Jeep, Iran Presidential Debate, David Hasselhoff as spokesman of World Oceans Day, Andy'll Try It!: Bakon Vodka, Donald Trump classes up Conan's parking space
9	June 11, 2009	Norm Macdonald, Jim Gaffigan	Neko Case ("This Tornado Loves You")
Mugshots of Conan, Law & Order talkshow, Conan & Slash buy guitar, Norm Macdonald's Rock of Love, Norm Plus One
10	June 12, 2009	Jamie Foxx, Kevin Nealon	Jamie Foxx ("Digital Girl")
Fart Party IX: Boner's Revenge, Conan's Tabloid Moment, Paris Hilton stops by unannounced, Interview with North Dakota's State Budget Manager, Calls from moms
11	June 15, 2009	Will Arnett, Joe Torre	Spinal Tap ("Heavy Duty")
Conan buys wax figures of Fonzie and Tom Cruise, Worst seat at the studio, Naming rights
12	June 16, 2009	Larry David, Lauren Conrad	Gavin Rossdale ("This Is Happiness")
Tom Cruise stalks Fonzie in the bathroom, Joe Biden visits Bellevue Elementary School, The Tonight Show Audiencey Awards
13	June 17, 2009	Kobe Bryant, William Shatner	Incubus ("Black Heart Inertia")
Fonzie and Tom Cruise at Lakers parade, Conan brings in huge statue, Casting for NBC's new film
14	June 18, 2009	Eva Mendes, Christopher Mintz-Plasse	The Dead Weather ("Hang You from the Heavens")
Jordan Schlansky vs. USC Marching Band, Twitter Tracker
15	June 19, 2009	Shia LaBeouf, Phil Jackson	Holly Williams ("Mama")
A message from All on TV, Conan takes Pierre Bernard out to a Greek diner, A rebuttal from Conan's father, Triumph the Insult Comic Dog at the Bonnaroo Music Festival
16	June 22, 2009	Cameron Diaz, Johnny Strange	Pete Yorn ("Don't Wanna Cry")
Conan meets the neighbors, Tonight Show Traffic-copter
17	June 23, 2009	Lisa Kudrow, Billy Mays & Anthony Sullivan	Elvis Costello ("Sulphur to Sugarcane")
Tribute to Ed McMahon, TMZ Wild
18	June 24, 2009	Brandon McMillan, Kerry Washington	Wilco ("You Never Know")
Conan's Tabloid Moment (With Wax Fonzie and Wax Tom Cruise), Twelve-foot-high Jehovah's Witnesses, Andy'll Try It!: Salli
19	June 25, 2009	Brüno, Stephen Moyer	Cirque du Soleil Zumanity
Conan visits the Intel Science Fair, Max Goes to the Airport
20	June 26, 2009	Snoop Dogg, Jerry Ferrara	Adele ("Hometown Glory")
Sleep American, the Appalachian Trail Visitors' Bureau, Universal Studio's King Kong attraction, A Message from All on TV, In the Year 3000

=== July ===
No.	Original release date	Guest(s)	Musical/entertainment guest(s)
21	July 6, 2009	Howie Mandel, Alanis Morissette	Death Cab for Cutie ("Little Bribes")
A Message from All on TV, Checking in on Max in Europe, Conan explores the Universal lot, Sanford or Steel?
22	July 7, 2009	Samuel L. Jackson, Kevin Connolly	Andrew Bird ("Oh No")
Mike Merrit's Inner Thoughts, Andy goes to Announcer school, Twitter Tracker
23	July 8, 2009	Meredith Vieira, Andy Hillstrand	Al Madrigal
Pro-Marijuana ad, Checking in on Max in Europe, The Tonight Show Tour-riffic Tram-tacular!, Celebrity Survey
24	July 9, 2009	Larry King, Zooey Deschanel	Playing for Change ("Stand By Me")
People injured while building the studio, The Tonight Show Back Row Irish Stepdancers, Reporting Live: Andy reports on the California wildfires, Who Wore it Best?
25	July 10, 2009	Bob Newhart, Cat Deeley	Ray LaMontagne ("Meg White")
Eric Hoffman gets kidnapped by Nike personnel, Conan visits the prop house, Noches de Pasion con Señor O'Brien
26	July 13, 2009	Jeff Goldblum, Bill Engvall	Hair ("Hair"/"Let the Sunshine In")
Home video of seven-year-old Sonia Sotomayor in Puerto Rico, Meteor parody, The Tonight Show Tour-riffic Tram-tacular!, New State Quarters
27	July 14, 2009	Michael Phelps, Paget Brewster	Sugar Ray ("Boardwalk")
Late-night Sonia Sotomayor nunchucks infomercial, Republican's negative Barack Obama ad, The Tonight Show Kiss Cam, Andy plays in the 2009 All-Star Legends & Celebrity Softball Game
28	July 15, 2009	Dana Carvey, Anthony Anderson	Allison Iraheta ("Barracuda")
Fox' depiction of Barack Obama's first pitch at the All-Star game, Lindsey Graham asks Sonia Sotomayor questions, Obamanopoly, Knight Rider studio, Celebrity Misquotes
29	July 16, 2009	Gerard Butler, Venus Williams	Daughtry ("No Surprise")
Arnold Schwarzenegger television ad, Bob Costas's Barack Obama interview, The Tonight Show Band run their own car wash, Interview with Bernie Madoff's prison consultant, Andy'll Try It!: Lady Gaga's flame-shooting bra
30	July 17, 2009	Seth Green, Steven Ho	Demi Lovato ("Here We Go Again")
Original Moon landing footage plus ALF, Mike Merrit's Inner Thoughts, America's Nicest Bathroom, Twitter Tracker
31	July 20, 2009	Adam Sandler, Peter Sarsgaard	Kate Voegele ("99 Times")
Original Moon landing footage plus Mr. T, Pet Airways, Slim Jim Shortage, Conan gives Jordan Schlansky apartment advice
32	July 21, 2009	Jonah Hill, Cheryl Hines	Dan Naturman
Hillary Clinton in New Delhi, Bad Happy Meal, The Tonight Show Tour-riffic Tram-tacular!, Shameless Kodak plug, The Tonight Show Photo Gallery
33	July 22, 2009	James Spader, Jack McBrayer	Mat Kearney ("Closer to Love")
The Real Parts of The Real Housewives of New Jersey, Anti Arnold ad, Getting to know Ronnie Gutierrez, In the Year 3000
34	July 23, 2009	Zach Galifianakis, Keke Palmer	Jason Aldean ("Big Green Tractor")
Taco Bell chihuahua tribute, Dodgers trivia (cameo appearance by Tommy Lasorda), Conan's Tabloid Moment, Interview with an NRA spokesperson
35	July 24, 2009	Seth Rogen, Rose Byrne	Eric Hutchinson ("OK It's Alright with Me")
Checking in on Max in Europe, Dumbledore hits Hollywood, Conan and Andy dub Ghost in the Shell at Manga Entertainment
36	July 27, 2009	Meryl Streep, Judd Apatow	The Fray ("Never Say Never")
NBC's response to GLAAD, William Shatner reading Sarah Palin's farewell speech, Celebrity Survey
37	July 28, 2009	Heidi Klum, Steve Zahn	Jimmy Carr
911 Call for Henry Louis Gate's arrest, Q&A about Michael Vick, Mr. Met Has Anger Issues, Mike Merrit's Inner Thoughts, The Tonight Show Back Row Dog Circus, Andy'll Try It!: iFly with Wax Figure Tom Cruise
38	July 29, 2009	Rainn Wilson, Rachel Maddow	Chicago ("25 or 6 to 4")
Blue and Black Lager Fake Ad, William Shatner reading Sarah Palin's tweets, Conan House-Hunts with Jordan Schlansky
39	July 30, 2009	Paul Giamatti, Jack Dagger	Regina Spektor ("Laughing With")
Interview with Oklahoma City public relations director, Interview with the inmate who interviewed Bernie Madoff, Googling with the Stars
40	July 31, 2009	Hank Azaria, Adam Richman	Ben Harper & Relentless7 ("Fly One Time")
Checking in on Max in Europe, The Tonight Show Kiss Cam, Andy and Mike's Beer Summit, Twitter Tracker

=== August ===
No.	Original release date	Guest(s)	Musical/entertainment guest(s)
41	August 3, 2009	Ashton Kutcher, Charlyne Yi	Gomez ("Airstream Driver")
Newly discovered Mozart song (Cheers Theme), Michael Phelps Blew Off the Pope, Max Is Back!, Ashton Kutcher and Bob Saget try to get into the studio, Conan, Please Blow Up My Car! contest introduction
42	August 4, 2009	Jeremy Piven, The Human Cannonballs	The All-American Rejects ("I Wanna")
Distorted Obama message, Forged Obama birth certificate, Conan & Andy on the Aisle
43	August 5, 2009	Sienna Miller, Steve Schirripa	Deon Cole
NBC Primetime Preview Show, LaBamba and the Undie Run, Wax Tom Cruise and The Fonz get shot out of a cannon
44	August 6, 2009	Jonas Brothers, Ed Helms	Jonas Brothers ("Paranoid")
Obama's health care speech, Twitter is down!, Conan, Please Blow Up My Car! contest plug, In the Year 3000
45	August 7, 2009	Eric Bana, Mary Lynn Rajskub	Flo Rida ("Jump")
Disneyland cutbacks, Conan Goes to the Universal Studios Gift Shop, Prisoners Working on The Tonight Show, A rebuttal from Conan's father
46	August 10, 2009	Kyra Sedgwick, Hugh Dancy	Lyle Lovett ("Choke That Chicken")
Bark Week, Obama's AFTRA Message, Celebrity Survey
47	August 11, 2009	Jon Hamm, Freestyle Motocross Athletes	Cobra Starship with Estelle ("Good Girls Go Bad")
Andy'll Try It: Inversion Table, Conan Questions GM
48	August 12, 2009	Gordon Ramsay, B. J. Novak	Willard Wigan
Conan, Please Blow Up My Car! - Submissions
49	August 13, 2009	Robin Williams, Piers Morgan	All Time Low ("Damned If I Do Ya (Damned If I Don't)")
Conan, Please Blow Up My Car! - Grand Prize, Falling Domino's Pizza Employees, Conan's Tabloid Moment
50	August 14, 2009	Shaquille O'Neal, Demetri Martin	Jack Ingram ("Barefoot and Crazy")
Triumph at dog hotel
51	August 24, 2009	Bill Maher, Nick Cannon	Kings of Leon ("Use Somebody")
Interview with Obama family, In the Year 3000, Penny designs
52	August 25, 2009	Quentin Tarantino, Mark Feuerstein	Smokey Robinson ("Don't Know Why")
Mexican Drug Law, Meeting Universal Neighbors
53	August 26, 2009	Bradley Cooper, Jon Lovitz	Franz Ferdinand ("What She Came For")
Noches de Pasion con Señor O'Brien
54	August 27, 2009	Mike Tyson, Keith Barry	Matisyahu ("One Day")
Tonight Show Mini-Dose of Joy (Puppies dressed as cats), Celebrity Survey
55	August 28, 2009	Nigel Marven, DJ Qualls	Colbie Caillat ("Fallin' for You")
The Tonight Show Tour-iffic Tram-tacular!
56	August 31, 2009	Norm Macdonald, Thomas Haden Church	Pitbull ("Calle Ocho/Hotel Room Service")
Tonight Show Mini-Dose of Joy (Puppies dressed as cats redux), Norm's long joke, Iceroad Tollbooth Operator

=== September ===
No.	Original release date	Guest(s)	Musical/entertainment guest(s)
57	September 1, 2009	Elijah Wood, Mila Kunis	Cheap Trick ("Sick Man of Europe")
Prop Auction, Punch Line Dancers
58	September 2, 2009	John McCain, Frank Caliendo	Third Eye Blind ("Bonfire")
Hangin' with Hayes, Swine Flu PSA
59	September 3, 2009	Sandra Bullock, The Little League World Series Champions	Gina Yashere
Tonight Show Traffic-copter, The Interrupter
60	September 4, 2009	Jennifer Connelly, Zane Lamprey	Ziggy Marley ("I Love You Too")
Conan, Please Blow Up My Car! - Finalist Chosen
61	September 8, 2009	Kate Beckinsale, Richard Lewis, Dhani Harrison	Dhani Harrison ("Birthday")
Celebrity Survey, "Birthday" is played on the new Beatles Rock Band
62	September 9, 2009	Tom Arnold, Tim Meadows	Reba McEntire ("Consider Me Gone")
Adult Store Surveillance Camera Footage, Wiggin' Out!, Conan Helps Suzie Learn To Drive
63	September 10, 2009	Dennis Quaid, Mr. & Mrs. G.	Paolo Nutini
NFL Made for TV Movie, Feminist Pornography
64	September 11, 2009	Antonio Banderas, Bill Hader	Chris Cornell
In the Year 3000, The Tonight Show Tour-iffic Tram-tacular!
65	September 14, 2009	Charlize Theron, Steven Ho	Dave Matthews Band
The Tonight Show Audiencey Awards, Kanye at the VMAs, Edible Tennis Balls
66	September 15, 2009	Jennifer Aniston, Melanie Oudin	Phoenix ("1901")
Conan Cleans Pools
67	September 16, 2009	Aaron Eckhart, Michael Strahan	Yeah Yeah Yeahs ("Heads Will Roll")
Mike Merritt's Inner Thoughts, Andy on Celebrity Jeopardy!
68	September 17, 2009	Megan Fox, Louis C.K.	Kevin Skinner ("If Tomorrow Never Comes")
Andy'll Try It!: Conference bicycle, Noches de Pasion con Señor O'Brien
69	September 18, 2009	Courteney Cox, Ted Danson	Nelly Furtado
Barack Obama heckled by Statler and Waldorf, Canada's Got Talent, Triumph at the Chabad Telethon
70	September 21, 2009	Ricky Gervais, Chicken Charlie	Lynyrd Skynyrd
Conan Saves Megan Fox, Before Photoshop
71	September 22, 2009	Rebecca Romijn, Lisa Lampanelli	Monsters of Folk ("Say Please")
Swine Flu PSAs, Conan and Andy dub Blood: The Last Vampire
72	September 23, 2009	Martin Short, Tim Gunn	Wynonna Judd
Swine Flu PSAs, New Fall Trends
73	September 24, 2009	Dave Salmoni, Joel McHale	india.arie
Audience Plugs, Conan's Hunky Vampire Assistant
74	Cancelled	Teri Hatcher, Seth MacFarlane	Rodrigo y Gabriela
NOTE: Episode uncompleted due to O'Brien suffering a concussion while performing a bit with Teri Hatcher. Episode #42 was aired instead.
75	September 28, 2009	Drew Barrymore, Joseph Talamo	Paramore
Conan's head injury
76	September 29, 2009	John Krasinski, Patton Oswalt	Quinn Dahle
Celebrity Survey, Conan's Hunky Vampire Assistant
77	September 30, 2009	Kate Walsh, Jesse Eisenberg	Brad Paisley
Sesame Street does health care, Tonight Show Hamster 500

=== October ===
No.	Original release date	Guest(s)	Musical/entertainment guest(s)
78	October 1, 2009	Michael Moore, Seth MacFarlane	Rodrigo y Gabriela
Conan visits a Barbershop quartet convention, Blame It on LaBamba
79	October 2, 2009	Drew Carey, Joe Buck	Joshua Bell with Tiempo Libre
Conan vs. Newark
80	October 5, 2009	Elliot Page, Kevin Nealon	Dierks Bentley
Conan vs. Newark Continues, Conan's Hunky Vampire Assistant
81	October 6, 2009	Edward Norton, Kristen Bell	Anvil
In the Year 3000
82	October 7, 2009	Jason Bateman, Selena Gomez	Toby Keith
The Tonight Show Tour-iffic Tram-tacular! (knife throwing), Black Drinking Day with Deon Cole
83	October 8, 2009	Christian Slater, Jimmie Johnson	Backstreet Boys
Hillary Clinton on the Newark feud, Andy's Advice to Levi Johnston, Yo Jay-Z Buy NBC
84	October 9, 2009	Jeff Garlin, Zack Hample	Lady Antebellum
The Michael Vick Project, Conan interviews Ajay Bhatt
85	October 12, 2009	Jamie Foxx, Jason Alexander	Grizzly Bear ("Two Weeks")
Breaking Weather News, Newark feud update, Black Jewish Drinking day with Deon Cole and Todd Levin
86	October 13, 2009	Ice-T, Eddie Izzard	The Flaming Lips ("Watching the Planets")
Breaking Weather News, Newark feud update, Conan Freckle Registry commercial
87	October 14, 2009	Serena Williams, Ken Jeong	Rascal Flatts
Breaking Weather News, Celebrity Survey
88	October 15, 2009	John C. Reilly, Sanjay Gupta	Matt Braunger
Conan and Andy's Cialis commercial, Countdown to Mayor Booker
89	October 16, 2009	Cory Booker, Max Records	Dashboard Confessional
Max Weinberg in Cory Booker's office, Triumph the Insult Comic Dog at pet boutique store.
90	October 26, 2009	Kathy Griffin, Chesley Sullenberger	Wolfmother
New State Quarters, Conan's Hunky Vampire Assistant
91	October 27, 2009	Garry Shandling, Paula Deen	Julian Casablancas ("11th Dimension")
Andy'll Try It!: CJ Jeans and electric paper airplane launcher
92	October 28, 2009	Chris O'Donnell, Lindsey Vonn	Uncle Kracker ("Smile")
Audience Plugs
93	October 29, 2009	Denis Leary, Rob Mies	The Swell Season ("Low Rising")
Conan visits the new Ford Taurus SHO
94	October 30, 2009	Susie Essman, Don Young	Alice in Chains ("Check My Brain")
Halloween Mini-Dose of Joy: Puppies Dressed as Frankenstein, Deon Cole at Halloween Horror Nights, Dennis Anderson smashes Don Young's giant pumpkin with Gravedigger

=== November ===
No.	Original release date	Guest(s)	Musical/entertainment guest(s)
95	November 2, 2009	Ewan McGregor, Shaun White	Tegan and Sara ("Hell")
Andy's vest made from leftover Halloween candy, Celebrity Survey
96	November 3, 2009	Neil Patrick Harris, Paul Teutul Sr.	Creed
Celebrity Trap (Dolph Lundgren), Before Photoshop
97	November 4, 2009	Amy Poehler, Magic Johnson & Larry Bird	The Bravery
William Shatner reads Levi Johnston's tweets, Conan talks via satellite to two gay fishermen (Brian Stack and Brian McCann) NOTE: Larry Bird appears via satellite, a first for the current iteration of The Tonight Show.
98	November 5, 2009	Jim Carrey, Olivia Wilde	Zac Brown Band
William Shatner reads Levi Johnston quotes, Conan hangs out with Wing Pang (first appearance since episode #45)
99	November 6, 2009	Cory Monteith, Harland Williams	Pixies ("Here Comes Your Man")
Andy's motorized podium, Deon Cole on blackface ("A Black Thing You Ought to Know")
100	November 9, 2009	Kelsey Grammer, Major Brian Dennis and Nubs	David Gray
A Message from All on TV, A Message from Conan's Father, Disneyland Shanghai map, Andy'll Try It: Neckline Slimmer and Facial Flex
101	November 10, 2009	Jessica Biel, Super Dave Osborne	John Fogerty
Deon Cole reviews Precious via satellite, The Tonight Show Audiency Awards
102	November 11, 2009	Heather Locklear, Drew Pinsky	Rod Man
Noches de Pasion con Señor O'Brien (cameo by Mario Lopez)
103	November 12, 2009	Al Gore, Jim Parsons	Jason Mraz
Going Green PSAs, In the Year 3000
104	November 13, 2009	Reese Witherspoon, Gabourey Sidibe	Kris Allen ("Live Like We're Dying")
The World's Tallest Dog & The World's Tallest Dachshund, New Trendz
105	November 16, 2009	Kristen Stewart, Judd Apatow	Carrie Underwood ("Temporary Home")
Conan's Hunky Vampire Assistant, Going Green PSAs
106	November 17, 2009	50 Cent, Jane Lynch	50 Cent
Trump Moon Bay Spa & Resort, Andy promotes the DVD release of Andy Barker, P.I., Andy flips off the NFL
107	November 18, 2009	Seth Green, Heidi Montag & Spencer Pratt	The Brian Setzer Orchestra
Celebrity Survey
108	November 19, 2009	Nicole Kidman, Anderson Cooper	Leona Lewis
Conan's Hunky Vampire Assistant, Going Green PSAs
109	November 20, 2009	Eva Mendes, Jon Bon Jovi	Bon Jovi ("We Weren't Born to Follow")
Andy's motorized podium, America's New Oprah, Altered movie posters
110	November 23, 2009	Taylor Lautner, Jon Lovitz	Timbaland with Nelly Furtado and SoShy
Conan's Hunky Vampire Assistant (cameo by Jerry Springer), Tonight Show Major League Soccer Cup Final Small Talk Moment, America's New Oprah
111	November 24, 2009	Jack McBrayer, Marisa Miller	Weezer ("(If You're Wondering If I Want You To) I Want You To")
America's New Oprah, Just Shut Up and Drink It: Jones Soda Tofurky and Gravy Soda
112	November 25, 2009	Norm Macdonald, Gretchen Bleiler	Dan Cummins
America's New Oprah, Special Thanksgiving edition of Twitter Tracker
113	November 26, 2009	Pee-wee Herman, Donald Faison	Bon Jovi ("Superman Tonight")
A Message from Conan's Father, Mini-Dose of Joy: Puppies Dressed as Thanksgiving Dinner, Conan's Thanksgiving Dinner (with Jordan Schlansky, Pierre Bernard, and Wing Pang)
114	November 30, 2009	William Shatner, AnnaLynne McCord	Mary Poppins ("Step in Time")
Conan's and "Andy's" Wax Figures, In the Year 3000

=== December ===
No.	Original release date	Guest(s)	Musical/entertainment guest(s)
115	December 1, 2009	Tobey Maguire, Chris Colfer	Rickie Lee Jones ("Wild Girl")
America's New Oprah, Pierre Bernard models a $5 million jockstrap
116	December 2, 2009	Jenny McCarthy, Gabriel Iglesias	Switchfoot ("Mess of Me")
America's New Oprah, Andy's day with Wax Conan
117	December 3, 2009	John Travolta, Rod Stewart	Rod Stewart ("Rainy Night in Georgia")
Andy on the local news, Conan and Andy's Comcast song, Conan Meets the Neighbors
118	December 4, 2009	Rachel McAdams, Mindy Kaling	Diane Birch ("Nothing But a Miracle")
Tiger Woods joke caddy, Andy's Comcast commercial, America's New Oprah
119	December 7, 2009	Howie Mandel, Deepak Chopra	Michael McDonald ("Have Yourself a Merry Little Christmas")
Tiger Woods joke caddy, Conan's Hunky Vampire Assistant, America's New Oprah
120	December 8, 2009	Josh Brolin, Tillie the Dog Artist	Chad Daniels
Tiger Woods joke caddy, Celebrity Survey
121	December 9, 2009	Snoop Dogg, Carl Reiner	Snoop Dogg
Tiger Woods joke caddy (cameo by Bob Saget), Dumbledore out on the town
122	December 10, 2009	Ben Stiller, Top Chef winner Michael Voltaggio	Thirty Seconds to Mars ("Kings and Queens")
Moral Outrage, America's New Oprah. Lance Armstrong makes a cameo appearance via satellite during Stiller's interview.
123	December 11, 2009	Zach Braff, Bear Grylls	Tony Bennett ("Have Yourself a Merry Little Christmas")
William Shatner and Sarah Palin read excerpts from each other's autobiographies, Conan's Apology Song to Diane Sawyer
124	December 14, 2009	Tom Arnold, Cheryl Hines	Adam Lambert ("Whataya Want from Me")
The Tonight Show Holiday Card (cameo by Mike Tyson), A Song for the Mormons
125	December 15, 2009	Megan Mullally, Mike Sorrentino & Nicole "Snooki" Polizzi	Norah Jones ("Chasing Pirates")
Velcro Christmas Tree, Andy's video game voice-over, Deon Cole on The Princess and the Frog
126	December 16, 2009	Wanda Sykes, James Cameron	Myq Kaplan
Velcro Christmas Tree, Cash4Sex.com commercial
127	December 17, 2009	John Krasinski, Claire Smith	Robin Thicke
Learning About the News While on the News, Conan Works at Best Buy, Conan's Tabloid Moment
128	December 18, 2009	Nigel Marven, Sam Worthington	Foreigner
Velcro Christmas Tree, Conan's Apology
129	December 21, 2009	Christina Applegate, David Gregory	Silversun Pickups ("Substitution")
Surprise pop quiz, Wax Conan Around the Office, Propmaster Bill Tull's Holiday Tips, Twitter Tracker
130	December 22, 2009	Lance Armstrong, Carson Daly	Kid Cudi
Drunken Dumbledore, Mini-Dose of Joy: Puppies Dressed as the Nativity scene, Conan and Andy on the Aisle
131	December 23, 2009	Elijah Wood, Derek Fisher	Dwayne Perkins
A Message From All On TV, Holiday Stamps, Noches de Pasion con Señor O'Brien

== 2010 ==
=== January ===
No.	Original release date	Guest(s)	Musical/entertainment guest(s)
132	January 4, 2010	Ethan Hawke, Patton Oswalt	Katharine McPhee ("I Had It All")
Tonight Show Flash Mob, New Years Resolutions, In the Year 3000
133	January 5, 2010	Queen Latifah, Chris Pratt	Juston McKinney
Tuning In Late To The News, Icy cold stare from Ice Cube, Triumph visits a dog spa
134	January 6, 2010	Matthew Broderick, Robin Tunney	Kesha
Dubai Tower Elevator Chat, Learning Na'vi, Celebrity Survey
135	January 7, 2010	Jackie Chan, Emily Blunt	Jencarlos
Security Fluffer Commercial, List of Red Flags, Audience Plugs
136	January 8, 2010	Michael Cera, Aziz Ansari	OK Go ("This Too Shall Pass")
NBC Rumors List, Detroit Job, Gatorade Andy, Deon Cole on racial terms
137	January 11, 2010	Gary Oldman, Dax Shepard	Vampire Weekend ("Cousins")
Conan's Hunky Vampire Assistant, The Tonight Show Audiency Awards
138	January 12, 2010	Tom Brokaw, Zachary Levi	Rosanne Cash ("Sea of Heartbreak")
Deal Or No Deal, Slow News Day, staff writer Deon Cole declares Conan a ho
139	January 13, 2010	Ricky Gervais, Bryce Dallas Howard	Whitney Cummings
Obama Supports Conan, Global Leaders Weigh In, Olympic Changes, Kenneth Interrupts, Learning About The News While On The News, Classic Tonight Show Moment
140	January 14, 2010	Rob Lowe, Jane Krakowski	Hilary Hahn
New NBC Show, CoCo Does Porno, Classic Tonight Show Moment, Conan Sells the Show, Andy's Letter
141	January 15, 2010	Jeff Bridges, Mary Lynn Rajskub	Lifehouse ("Halfway Gone")
Parking Lot Shootout, Classic Tonight Show Moment, staff writer Deon Cole declares Conan a pimp
142	January 18, 2010	Martin Scorsese, Colin Firth	Kooza from Cirque du Soleil
Classic Tonight Show Moment, Deon Cole declares Conan is black
143	January 19, 2010	Quentin Tarantino, Paul Bettany	Spoon ("Written in Reverse")
Classic Tonight Show Moment, Norm Macdonald brings Conan a gift basket
144	January 20, 2010	Adam Sandler, Joel McHale	Joss Stone with Raphael Saadiq ("Big Ol' Game")
Classic Tonight Show Moment, final appearance of the Masturbating Bear, Ed Helms sings Conan a song, the $1.5 million skit (Bugatti Veyron Mouse, set to the tune of "(I Can't Get No) Satisfaction")
145	January 21, 2010	Robin Williams	Barry Manilow ("(Where Do I Begin?) Love Story")
Classic Tonight Show moment, Pee-wee Herman explains the Tonight Show controversy, the $4.8 million skit (2009 Kentucky Derby winner Mine That Bird watches restricted Super Bowl footage while wearing a mink Snuggie), Ben Stiller gives a The More You Know public service announcement, Robin Williams performs an Irish jig, Conan sings "The End of the Show Song".
146	January 22, 2010	Tom Hanks, Will Ferrell	Neil Young ("Long May You Run")
The $65 million sketch (Smithsonian Institution's fossil skeleton of a ground sloth spraying beluga caviar on an original Pablo Picasso painting); The Tonight Show with Conan O'Brien retrospective montage; Conan's exit interview with Steve Carell; Beck, Will Ferrell, Billy Gibbons, Ben Harper, Conan, Viveca Paulin, and The Tonight Show Band perform "Free Bird"

== See also ==
- List of The Tonight Show episodes
