= Narkar =

Narkar is a surname. Notable people with the surname include:

- Avinash Narkar, Indian actor
- Sunil Narkar (born 1961), American actor, writer, producer, and philanthropist
- Vasant Narkar, Indian film director and writer
- Aishwarya Narkar, Indian actor and producer
