= Ajay Bhatt =

Indian-American computer engineer

Ajay V. Bhatt
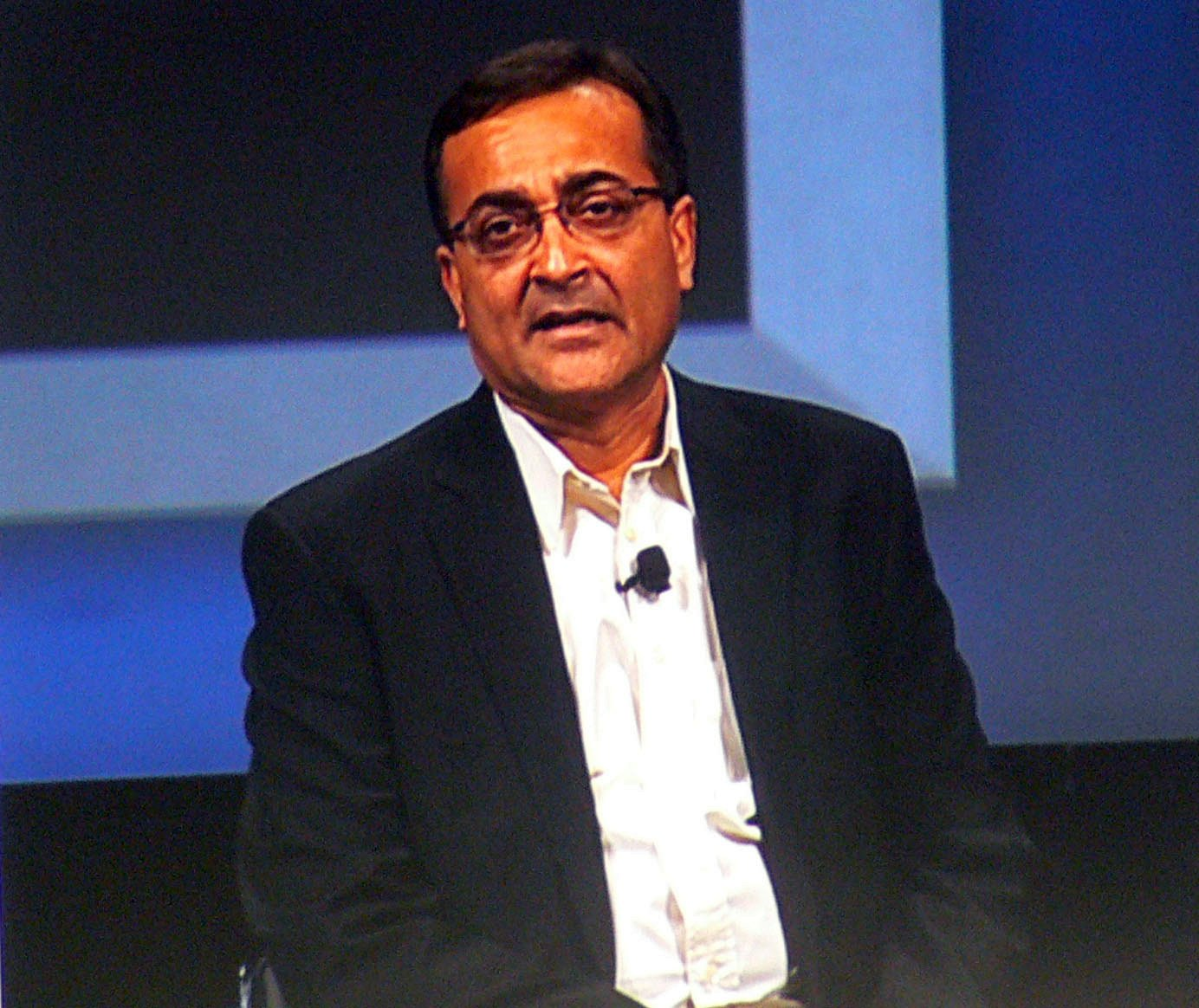
- Bhatt at the 2010 Intel International Science and Engineering Fair in San Jose, California
- Born: 6 September 1957
- Education: Maharaja Sayajirao University of Baroda, City College of New York
- Occupation: Chief Client Platform Architect at Intel
- Known for: Universal Serial Bus

Ajay V. Bhatt is an Indian-American computer architect who produced several widely used technologies, including USB (Universal Serial Bus), Platform Power Management architecture, and various other chipsets.

In January 2025, he was honored with the Padma Shri, India's fourth-highest civilian award, by the Government of India.

== Early life ==
Bhatt completed his Bachelor of Engineering (Electrical) in 1980 from the Maharaja Sayajirao University of Baroda, India and received his master's degree from the City College of New York, United States.

== Career ==
Bhatt joined Intel in 1990 as a senior staff architect on the chipset architecture team in Folsom. He holds one hundred and thirty-two U.S. and international patents, and several others are in various stages of filing. In 1998, 2003 and 2004, Bhatt was nominated to take part in a Distinguished Lecture Series at leading universities in the United States and Asia. Ajay received an Achievement in Excellence Award for his contribution in PCI Express specification development in 2002.

Intel's Chief I/O architect responsible for the platform and I/O interconnects directions, Bhatt also leads definition and development of the next-generation Client Platform architecture.

The October 9, 2009 episode of the late night variety/talk show The Tonight Show with Conan O'Brien included a comedy sketch featuring him that parodied Intel's "Rockstar" commercials.

Bhatt was brought greater attention by a 2009 Intel television advertisement in which he was portrayed by actor Sunil Narkar.

== Recognition ==
- Featured in GQ India's July 2010 issue as one of "The 50 Most Influential Global Indians."
- Recipient of The Light of India Award in 2012 for contributions to the advancement of science and technology.
- Winner of the 2013 European Inventor Award in the Non-European Countries category.
- Recipient of the Outstanding Achievement in Science & Technology Award at The Asian Awards, London, April 2013.
- Awarded the Padma Shri by the Government of India in 2025.
