= List of The Tonight Show with Conan O'Brien sketches =

The following is a list of sketches which debuted on The Tonight Show with Conan O'Brien on NBC.

== Carried over from Late Night ==
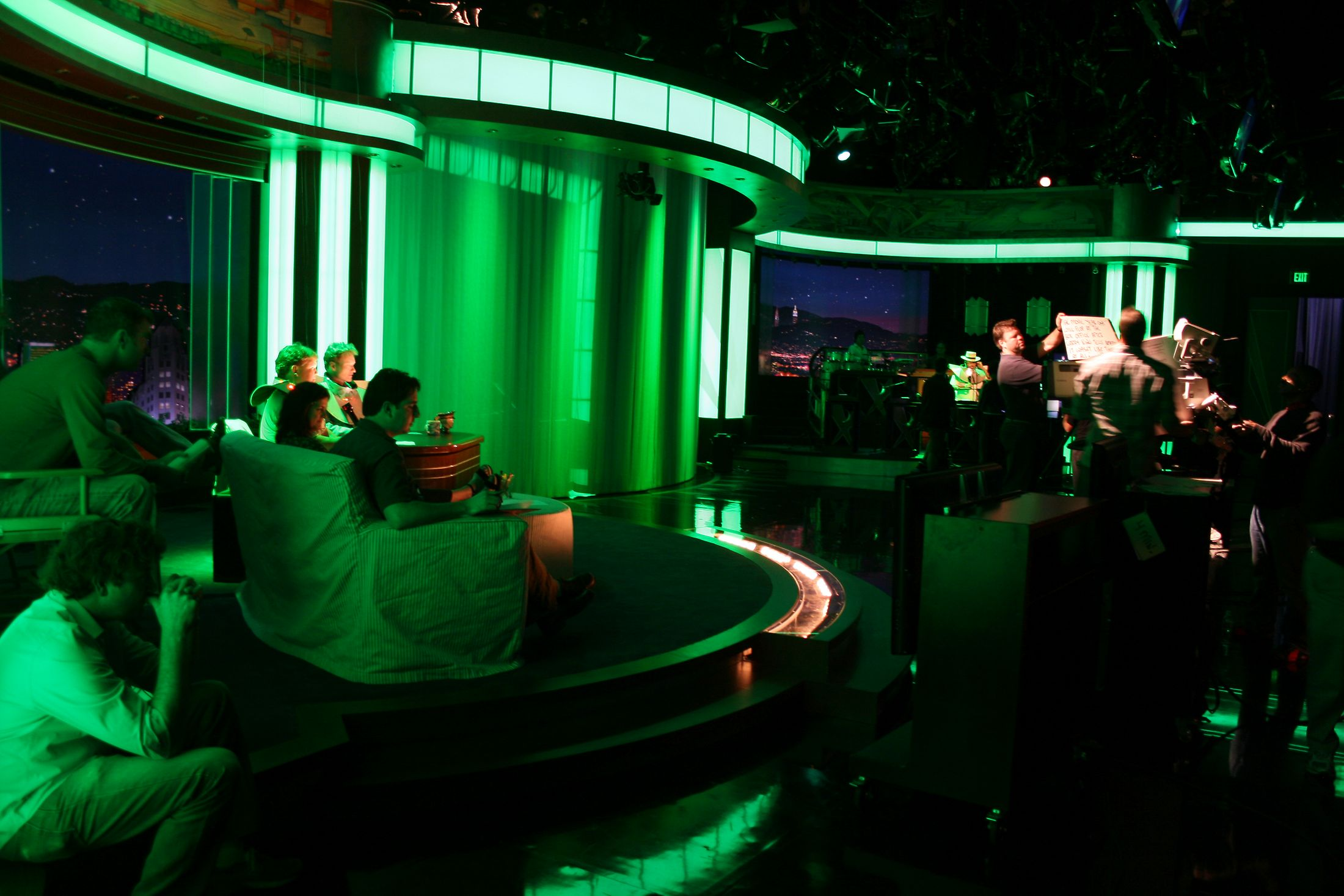
In The Year 3000

Many sketches originated on O'Brien's original show, Late Night with Conan O'Brien and were carried over to, and continued on The Tonight Show during O'Brien's short reign. The sketches include:

- In the Year 3000 (originally as 2000 on Late Night)
- Moral Outrage
- Celebrity Survey
- Noches de Pasion con Señor O'Brien
- The Audiencey Awards
- Movie Casting
- Mike Merritt's Inner Thoughts
- New Coins/Stamps
- Photo Gallery
- Hanging Out with Jordan Schlansky
- Conan and Andy On The Aisle
- Brian McCann on the Spot
- Pender Sings
- The Interrupter
- Small Talk Moment

== Twitter Tracker ==
In this sketch, Conan is interrupted by an overzealous announcer (voiced by show writer Brian McCann) while lamenting the increasing number of celebrities who are using Twitter. The announcer attempts to prove to Conan that celebrity tweets are exciting by reading some of his favorites, which all describe mundane activities or are bland statements. Some examples include Ashton Kutcher reporting that he is going to the grocery store, and Jennifer Love Hewitt saying that the weather is beautiful.

The sketch is always accompanied by increasingly elaborate animations in which the bird from the Twitter logo is repeatedly killed. It also includes the announcer trying to persuade Conan to play a game by using a rhyming sentence in which he refers to him as CoCo. Past games have included Complete the Tweet, Trick or Tweet, and Beat the Tweet.

On Thanksgiving, The Tonight Show celebrated Tweetsgiving, during which the announcer read celebrity thanks (tweets that give thanks). Christmas and Chanukah-themed tweets were read during the holiday season. The Tweetsgiving game was "Pilgrim or Pornstar?", where Conan had to guess if the following tweet was by a pilgrim or a porn star.

== Conan's Tabloid Moment ==
Having acknowledged the higher profile that comes with being host of The Tonight Show, Conan schemes to beat the paparazzi at their own game by photographing himself in embarrassing situations and selling the pictures directly to the tabloids. To manufacture these moments, Conan makes use of a green screen and some inexpensive props. Past moments have included Conan running over a bible salesman, stealing underwear from Barbara Walters, loading a corpse into the trunk of a car, and kicking babies at a playground (all while drunk).

== Traffic Copter ==
As Conan discusses L.A.'s chronic traffic problems, he calls for a view from The Tonight Show's traffic copter. The scene then shifts to a fake road filled with gridlocked toy cars. The cause of the traffic jam would always be something absurd, such as a dog celebrating its bar mitzvah, a marauding robot, or a giant Amy Winehouse passed out on the road. Based on a former sketch used on his previous show in similar fashion.

== Trump Properties ==
After discussing something topical, Conan will present a video from Donald Trump. In the video, Trump divulges his plans as they relate to the topic. These plans always include constructing something ridiculously expensive, such as a parking space paved with imported marble or a resort on the moon.

== Andy'll Try It ==
In this sketch, Andy is given a product to test and review. Past products have included Bacon vodka, a flaming bra worn by Lady Gaga, and a skydiving simulator.

On one occasion, Andy was presented with a Tofurky and Gravy flavored Jones Soda. After refusing to try it, the sketch was renamed "Just Shut Up and Drink It" and the unpleasant task was passed along to LaBamba, who instantly gagged and regurgitated the beverage.

== Live Via Satellite ==
After discussing an interesting news story, Conan would sometimes introduce a tangentially related guest who he would claim was appearing live via satellite. At the beginning of the interview Conan would often note the surprisingly good quality of the satellite feed or simply call the technology very expensive. In reality, the guest would actually be in front of a false wall or green screen just a few feet away from Conan and in full view of the studio audience. At the end of the interview, the guest would sometimes walk off camera while still in split-screen format and cross in front of Conan's camera, clearly demonstrating that he was there the whole time.

== Wax Fonzie and Wax Tom Cruise ==
While visiting a warehouse full of poor quality celebrity wax figures, Conan identified two as his favorite and purchased them. One was of Henry Winkler as his Happy Days character Arthur Fonzarelli (whose hand positioning caused Conan to comment that he had just finished up at the urinal), and the other was a creepy-looking figure of Tom Cruise. Both wax figures made several appearances on the show.

In addition to appearing in various places around the studio (such as at the urinal in the men's washroom), Wax Fonzie and Wax Tom Cruise were also spotted at the Los Angeles Lakers' 2009 NBA championship celebration and were incorporated into many recurring sketches on the show (such as an installment of "Conan's Tabloid Moment" where Wax Fonzie played a corpse and Wax Tom Cruise played a murderous accomplice).

Both figures were routinely placed in dangerous situations and sustained damage. Wax Tom Cruise was decapitated and dismembered while testing out Universal's skydiving simulator during an installment of "Andy'll Try It". Meanwhile, Wax Fonzie was stabbed while acting as Conan's assistant during a knife-throwing segment. Both figures later were shot out of circus cannons. Wax Tom Cruise emerged unscathed, but Wax Fonzie landed on his face and was horribly mangled. When he was brought out at a later date as part of a "Prop Auction" sketch, the audience audibly gasped in amusement at his appearance.

Wax Fonzie was last seen sitting in the car that was blown up at the conclusion of the "Conan, Please Blow Up My Car" contest, and was presumably destroyed after the explosion. Wax Tom Cruise was stationed nearby to say farewell.

Wax Tom Cruise eventually returned during an installment of "America's New Oprah" and was made to re-enact the real Tom Cruise's infamous couch-jumping incident. Toward the end of the Tonight Show controversy in January, Wax Tom Cruise was featured on Twitter in a picture, wearing a "Team Conan" shirt.

== A Message from All On TV ==
After reaching significant milestones in his career, Conan would present a message he claimed was sent to him from his peers in the television industry. The message would consist of a series of clips from various news and talk shows that had been spliced together to create the message to Conan. The message would usually close by insulting either Andy or Max.

== A Rebuttal from Conan's Father ==
After Conan says something respectful and thoughtful about senior citizens, he will receive a video rebuttal message from his dad. In the message, Conan's dad belittles Conan's achievements and describes him as insincere and uncaring. He also notes how Conan pales in comparison to his older brother. It is sometimes even suggested that Conan's brother has died as a result of Conan's stupidity.

== Conan Visits His Neighbors ==
Conan visits various businesses near the Universal Studios lot, poking fun at the bizarre establishments he finds. Past businesses have included a pornography studio, a tattoo parlor operated by a man named Freak Show, and a store that exclusively sells items decorated like the American flag.

== Wing Pang ==
On August 7, 2009, a remote piece aired featuring Conan's visit to an NBC/Universal Studios Gift Shop. During the filming of the remote, Conan interviewed an NBC employee by the name of Wing Pang. Conan was visibly impressed by the man's natural comedic timing and sincere personality and the focus of the remote shifted from the NBC store to Wing Pang, himself. Directly after the airing of the segment, Conan brought Wing Pang on stage and thanked him for his participation in the remote. Wing Pang went on to make two more appearances, the first of which aired on Nov. 5 which was another remote piece featuring an interview between Conan and Wing followed by a fencing match between the two. Wing's third and final appearance was on Nov. 26, which was another remote, this time featuring Conan's Thanksgiving dinner with Wing as well as Jordan Schlansky and Pierre Bernard.

== Bon Voyage, Max ==
Whenever Max Weinberg goes on tour with Bruce Springsteen and the E Street Band, Conan will imply that Max must leave the show immediately in order to make his flight. The entire platform on which Max sits will then start moving as Max continues to drum. The motorized platform goes out into the street, presumably on its way to the airport. Various things might occur along the way, such as Max stopping at a drive-thru or Max being hit by a large truck.

== Checking in on Max in Europe ==
In this sketch, Conan reveals that Max Weinberg has allowed a camera crew to follow him while touring in Europe with Bruce Springsteen and the E Street Band. Conan then decides to check and see what Max is doing at that particular moment. A stock footage clip of a person involved in an altercation with police is then shown. The intent is for the audience to believe this person is Max.

== Tonight Show Tour-iffic Tram-tacular ==
When their studio was added to the Universal Studios Tour, Conan acknowledged that it could not compete with the other stops on the tour. In order to compensate for this, Conan and Andy would act out exciting scenarios as the tour passed the studio. Past scenarios have included Conan delivering Andy's baby and Conan curing Andy's paralysis.

== Back Row Entertainment ==
Feeling that those audience members seated at the back of the studio did not get as good an experience as those seated near the front in "the Cone Zone", Conan would arrange for some special entertainment in the back row. This entertainment was usually something underwhelming, such as a hamster race or a bodybuilder posing.

== Kiss Cam ==
Inspired by a recent trip to Dodger Stadium, Conan introduces the concept of couples sharing a kiss when the camera settles on them. These sketches typically deviate from this standard formula by including several odd pairings, such as a hunter making out with a bear or a nerdy Harry Potter fan groping an imaginary woman.

== Conan and Andy Do Anime ==
In response to the immense popularity of Japanese anime, Conan and Andy went to the studios of Bang Zoom! Entertainment to record voiceovers for some of their films. These voiceovers consisted primarily of improvising comical dialogue based on literal interpretations of the scenes.

== Dumbledore Goes Hollywood ==
Following the release of Harry Potter and the Half-Blood Prince, Conan reports that one the film's main actors has let success go to his head. Footage of Albus Dumbledore (played by Brian Stack) harassing partygoers in Hollywood is then played.

Throughout the video, Dumbledore uses many Harry Potter-themed innuendoes, such as asking women if he can Slytherin to their Gryffindor. At the end of each sketch, Dumbledore is either beaten or pursued by the police and his mug shot is displayed.

== Shatner Recites Palin ==
After former Alaska governor Sarah Palin used flowery language during her resignation speech (and later on her Twitter account), Conan called on William Shatner to recite some of her most poetic statements in a dramatic, exaggerated fashion reminiscent of his musical career. During these sketches, Shatner would be accompanied by Mike Merritt on bass and Ronnie Gutierrez or James Wormsworth on bongos.

During one installment, after Shatner had read from Palin's autobiography, Palin appeared and read from Shatner's autobiography (which includes a description of riding an elephant in his underwear).

In later occurrences, Shatner instead recited statements from Levi Johnston's Twitter account, which were crude and pointless rather than poetic.

== Conan's Fake Endorsements ==
After mentioning that Oprah Winfrey is suing companies for using her name and image without permission, Conan claims to be a victim of similar unauthorized endorsements. He then shows a commercial made up of clips that were spliced together to give the impression he was endorsing a certain product (while making other inappropriate remarks). Conan would later admit that he would be okay with the endorsement if he was being paid for it.

In one installment, Max claimed to be a victim of unauthorized endorsements as well, only to later admit that his endorsement of a male enhancement cream was legitimate.

== Puppies Dressed as Cats ==
Conan gives his audience a Mini Dose of Joy by bringing out puppies that are wearing cat costumes. The sketch is accompanied by an annoyingly repetitive song. For Halloween, the sketch was changed to "Puppies Dressed as Frankensteins". For Thanksgiving, the sketch was changed to "Puppies Dressed as Thanksgiving Dinner".

== Clinton Chart ==
2009 proved to be a successful year for former President Bill Clinton and occasionally Conan would use a chart to illustrate fluctuations in his popularity. The chart consisted of a picture of Clinton and an arrow that was attached at his crotch. As positive statistics were presented, the arrow would thicken and elongate, simulating an erection. When negative statistics were presented, the arrow would shrink and shrivel up.

== Elmo PSAs ==
In this sketch, a PSA featuring Elmo would be shown, in which his voice had been dubbed over. While his human counterparts offered sincere advice to children regarding ways to prevent the spread of illnesses (such as Swine Flu), Elmo would announce that death was inevitable and instead urge children to make peace with their God or to stay home and smoke cigarettes.

== Tonight Show PSAs ==
In response to current events, the staff of the Tonight Show present a series of PSAs they have recorded. Following a pair of humorous messages from Conan and Andy, a third message is shown, which usually stars either Max or LaBamba. This final message features information that is just barely related to the subject matter being discussed. For example, Max recorded a Swine Flu PSA in which he suggested that everyone wear surgical masks, but only so women would have a harder time identifying him after he exposes himself to them on the subway. Similarly, LaBamba recorded an Environmentalism PSA in which he eats spaghetti from a dumpster and then simply shouts "Environment!"

== Conan's Hunky Vampire Assistant ==
Due to the popularity of vampire-themed films and shows such as Twilight, True Blood, and The Vampire Diaries, Conan hired a vampire assistant named Cody Deveraux. Stereotypically brooding and overly dramatic, Cody's appearance is always accompanied by melancholy emo music. The sketches always end with Cody fleeing the studio in despair after receiving some mildly upsetting information. Once outside, sunlight causes Cody to ignite, leaving only a pile of charred clothes on the sidewalk. After one such appearance (and subsequent death), Tonight Show announcer Andy Richter questioned Cody's ability to repeatedly die, only to later reappear unharmed. Cody's true fate was then revealed, as he was shown backstage drinking coffee and smoking a cigarette.

In later occurrences of the sketch, Cody becomes distraught upon learning that Conan has hired additional assistants based on popular films. This included hiring a zombie due to the popularity of Zombieland, hiring an invisible presence due to the popularity of Paranormal Activity, hiring a wolf boy due to the popularity of The Twilight Saga: New Moon, hiring a football player due to the popularity of The Blind Side, and hiring a Na'vi after the success of Avatar. Another assistant to appear alongside Cody was Frankenstein's monster (played by Brian Stack) from Late Night with Conan O'Brien.

In one skit, Jerry Springer was called in to break up a fight between Cody and Wolf Boy. When Cody inevitably committed suicide, Jerry followed suit, revealing that he, too, had been a vampire all along.

== New Trends ==
Conan takes the time to let his viewers know what is in and what is out for the coming season. The items that are out are usually a bizarre variation of a current trend, such as being touched by an iPod salesman rather than buying an iPod Touch.

== High Definition Wizard of Oz ==
Following the release of The Wizard of Oz in High Definition, Conan complained that the film had been ruined. He then presented examples of scenes that had been worsened by the incredible level of detail. These scenes included things that had supposedly gone unnoticed in previous versions of the film, such as the Cowardly Lion's penis or a smoking munchkin.

== LA Weather Update ==
During a time when Los Angeles was experiencing light rain, Conan's commentary about the weather would be interrupted by updates from a weather reporter (played by Brian McCann). The weather reporter was often surrounded by individuals who reacted to the rain in extreme fashion, such as emergency crews, a robotic mop, and roving bands of warriors. The sketches were meant to exaggerate Los Angeles residents' fear of the rain.

== New Smoky Ads ==
When the United States Forest Service released new ads featuring Smoky the Bear, Conan noted their aggressive tone and disturbing content. He then presented the ads, in which Smoky's voice had been dubbed over. In each installment, Smoky would confront someone who was being careless with fire and threaten to do terrible things to them, like bury them alive or bite off their genitals.

== Andy's Motorized Podium ==
Inspired by a man who garnered media attention for motorizing his recliner, Andy revealed that he'd motorized the podium from which he watches each episode. For the next few moments Andy would pilot his podium around the stage, often cutting in front of the camera and distracting Conan as he attempts to continue with the show.

== America's New Oprah ==
Following the announcement that Oprah Winfrey's talk show would be concluding in 2011, Conan dubbed himself the new Oprah and commanded his audience to buy obscure products. His recommendations included the 1974 made-for-TV movie Killdozer, a calendar of extraordinary chickens, and an album of music from action film star Steven Seagal. Conan would later refer to the Amazon.com pages for these items to prove that customers had indeed been purchasing them together.

On one occasion, Max was called upon to provide relationship advice in the style of Dr. Phil. Max happily reminded viewers to ask prostitutes if they are actually cops before requesting services.

Other past recommendations have included Cool as Ice, several films from the Leprechaun franchise, Troll 2, and a Christmas-themed VHS starring Kathie Lee Gifford (which was so terrible that Conan revoked his recommendation).

== Sucking up to Comcast ==
After NBC had been purchased by Comcast, Conan would announce that no jokes would be made at his new employers' expense, opting instead to list the various accomplishments that made them worthy of respect. Andy, sometimes wearing Comcast merchandise, would offer similar sentiments. At the end of the sketch, LaBamba would usually be called upon to provide his opinion of Comcast, but would instead announce something childish and unrelated, such as "I like pancakes!"

== Tiger Woods Joke Caddie ==
Following the revelation that Tiger Woods had been cheating on his wife with several different women, Conan insisted that he needed professional help to determine which of the numerous possible jokes he should tell with regards to Woods' infidelities. A caddie would then enter, carrying with him a golf bag full of cue cards. After evaluating the audience for things such as temperature and wind speed, the caddie would select a joke for Conan to read. Prior to the reading of the joke, Andy would comment on the situation in the hushed voice of a golf announcer.

During one installment, Conan and his caddie were interrupted by Bob Saget, who appeared with his own joke caddie and asked to play through.

== Sketches introduced during the Tonight Show conflict ==
=== Classic Tonight Show Moment ===
In the weeks leading to O'Brien's departure following a seven-month tenure, Conan began showing "classic" moments from their seven months at The Tonight Show. The sketch was a joke, as a show usually runs for a number of years before it starts showing classic clips, rather than a few months, as was Conan's tenure as host. Such sketches included: when the wax figures of Tom Cruise and Fonzie were shot from a cannon, or Tom Hanks was hit with a meteorite. Conan asks why one of the vignettes in the opening shows him suffering a concussion.

=== Writer Deon Cole ===
Saying that one of the staff members wants to share his thoughts about what is happening, Conan introduces writer Deon Cole, who described, in successive episodes, how Conan is a ho, a pimp, or black, asking Conan such questions as "Has Charlie Sheen/Paris Hilton ever been on your couch?" The routine ends with the word of the day (such as "BLACK MAN" or "PIMP") being stamped over Conan's face, similar to the "Ass" stamp.

=== I Put The Tonight Show on Craigslist ===
Saying, "I do not know if I'm even legally allowed to do this, but screw it," Conan says he put The Tonight Show up for sale on Craigslist, and shows the "real" responses he received, and that these are real photos of what was offered, such as a 1970 AMC Gremlin, or someone's brother. No element of The Tonight Show was actually sold.

=== Crazy Expensive Comedy Bits ===
During the final week of his Tonight Show tenure, Conan decided to unveil new characters that were designed to be more expensive than funny since NBC is required to pay for everything used in the show's segments. The first night, Conan introduced the 'Bugatti Veyron Mouse', an actual model of the car dressed in mouse whiskers and ears accompanied by the master recording of The Rolling Stones '(I Can't Get No) Satisfaction' at a purported cost of $1.5 million. In reality, the car was donated for use by the Petersen Automotive Museum, however NBC was forced to remove all web clips of the sketch from its website and Hulu in order to avoid paying the royalty fees for 'Satisfaction'.

The following night, Conan acquired 2009 Kentucky Derby winner Mine That Bird, dressed the horse in a mink Snuggie and had it watch restricted NFL Super Bowl coverage at a purported cost of $4.8 million. Repeated viewings by internet viewers revealed though that the horse was similar looking stand-in and that the football footage shown was actually from the USFL.

The final show featured a purchased fossil of a ground sloth from the Smithsonian spraying an original Picasso with beluga caviar at a cost of $65 million. After this, Conan addressed the fact that internet users believed the purchases to be real, stating that they were all supposed to be obvious fakes.
