= Lockdown (Stargate SG-1) =

- Stargate SG-1 episode
- Episode no.: Season 8 Episode 3
- Directed by: Will Waring
- Written by: Joseph Mallozzi and Paul Mullie
- Production code: 803
- Original air date: July 23, 2004

Guest appearances
- Gavin Hood as Colonel Alexi Vaselov; Aaron Pearl as Major Kearney; Alisen Down as Doctor Brightman; Holly Ferguson as Lieutenant Evans; Arvydas Lebeliunas as Anatole Konstantinov

Episode chronology
← Previous "New Order"	Next → "Zero Hour"
- Stargate SG-1 (season 8)

"Lockdown" is the third episode for season eight of the Canadian-American military science fiction television series Stargate SG-1. The episode was written by Joseph Mallozzi and Paul Mullie, and directed by Will Waring. This was the only episode in the eighth season to receive a syndication rating, but was also one of the lowest rated of the season on the Nielsen household ratings. The episode got strong reviews from major media publishers worldwide.

"Lockdown" is about the discovery of an outbreak of disease which first occurred in the Russian Federation, but later on infects personnel of Stargate Command. The outbreak is later revealed to be the ethereal remains of Anubis. At the same time, Jack O'Neill stops the recruiting process for SG-1 leaving Samantha Carter as the new leader of SG-1 throughout season 8. Anubis tries to take new hosts but is eventually defeated and forced to a destination chosen by Carter, a frozen, barren planet.

== Plot ==
Several months after the destruction of Anubis' fleet, Stargate Command gets a new member in the form of Russian Air Force Colonel Alexi Vaselov (Russian: Алексей Вaсильев) who promptly asks General O'Neill for a place in SG-1. After the general rejects this request, Daniel talks to Vaselov about it, but the colonel suddenly collapses. When he wakes up again, he doesn't remember anything since he was in Russia, and his body shows signs of extensive viral damage. Gen O'Neill is concerned that there may be a contagion on the base, and orders Daniel to the infirmary just as he is about to leave on a mission with SG-11. Daniel suddenly pulls out his gun and injures several people, yelling for the gate to be opened, before he is stopped by O'Neill and Teal'c. O'Neill orders for no one to enter or leave the base to avoid spreading possible disease.

Meanwhile, Vaselov begins to remember what happened—that he felt like being trapped in his own body—and he blames himself for what has happened. It is also discovered that a Russian cosmonaut from the International Space Station died a week after returning to Russia, exhibiting the same symptoms as Vaselov, and that Vaselov was with him when he died. Later, Daniel wakes up and quickly remembers that he was taken over by Anubis. It turns out that the former System Lord, thanks to his half-ascended form as a dark specter, can easily travel between hosts. He got into the cosmonaut's body from space debris, and is moving from person to person to get to the stargate. The members of SGC conclude that Anubis plans to leave through the stargate rather than use his ascended powers, since that would draw attention from the Ancients. However, he needs a body in order to get through the stargate. In the meantime, Anubis is easily eluding capture, so the SGC must execute a bold plan to stop him.

This plan involves splitting the base into three zones. Power to the stargate is shut off, and is only accessible from Zone 1. The gate itself, and its surrounding areas, is in Zone 2. Hallways between the zones and into the gateroom are blocked using drop-down steel doors, and these can only be opened from Zone 3. All staff are restricted to one section only—no movement between sections is allowed.

However, Anubis takes over Carter (who is in the section controlling the "lockdown"), and makes her schedule a program to open the doors temporarily. She goes into the new control room and begins dialing the gate. O'Neill tries to stop her. With no other options, Jack and Major Kearney trigger the self-destruct, only for Jack to zat Kearney, revealing that Anubis is now possessing Jack's body. With the Stargate now active, Anubis now controlling Jack attempts to walk through the Stargate but Carter gets to the control room and ends the self-destruct sequence. She doesn't, however, manage to stop the gate from dialing, and it activates. Just as O'Neill is about to step through the gate, Col Vaselov, who has escaped from the infirmary, stops him. He holds O'Neill/Anubis at gunpoint and tells the Goa'uld to take his body instead. Anubis accepts, and steps through the stargate in Vaselov's body.

Afterwards, Carter reveals that Anubis did not actually escape, as she did manage to override the dialing process to send him to an alternate address. The planet she chose to send him to was extremely cold, so Vaselov's body froze, leaving Anubis unable to dial a new address.

== Production ==
Aaron Pearl who portrayed Major Kearney in the episode, previously played the younger version of George Hammond in the season two episode "1969". "Lockdown" was the first shot episode for season eight, but became the third to air so that they could continue the cliffhanger after previous season episode, "Lost City". Writer Joseph Mallozzi wanted to have an episode centered around Jack O'Neill's new job in Stargate Command, to "Test him early" on "as the new [...] commander."

In the first script draft, Anubis was set to appear in a fiery planet at the end of the episode, but when the script was finished he ended up in a frozen planet. Mallozzi when commenting on the episode, said it was an "Image I'd been dying to use". When Samantha Carter told Jack O'Neill in the original draft where she had sent Anubis, O'Neill responded "Well, I hope he wore his warm socks." The line was dropped since producers felt it was "too callous" for the character. One of the early scenes featuring Alexi Vaselov, where he awakens to find Teal'c in the observation room, was originally scripted to take place in the infirmary. Originally Teal'c was set to appear at Daniel Jackson's bedsite with Vaselov engaging in the conversation.

== Reception ==
"Lockdown" received 2.0 in Nielsen household rating and 1.7 in syndication ratings becoming the only episode in season eight to receive a syndication rating. The episode debuted on the Sci Fi Channel in the United States on July 23, 2004, with Stargate Atlantis episode "Hide and Seek". It was the top-rated show on the Sci Fi Channel that week. "Lockdown" drew close to 2.7 million viewers in the United States, this was down four-tenths from the previous episode "New Order". While the viewership was higher than the previous season which averaged a 1.8 in Nielsen household ratings, "Lockdown" was surpassed by sister show Stargate Atlantis episode "Hide and Seek" in ratings and viewership. The episode was noted as the first Stargate SG-1 episode which was not the top-rated show on the Sci Fi Channel in the week in two years.
