= Zero Hour (Stargate SG-1) =

- Stargate SG-1 episode
- Episode no.: Season 8 Episode 4
- Directed by: Peter Woeste
- Written by: Robert C. Cooper
- Production code: 804
- Original air date: July 30, 2004

Guest appearances
- David Kaufman as Mark Gilmor; Cliff Simon as Ba'al; Eric Breker as Reynolds; Colin Cunningham as Paul Davis; Pierre Bernard as O'Brien; Steve Bacic as Camulus

Episode chronology
← Previous "Lockdown"	Next → "Icon"
- Stargate SG-1 (season 8)

"Zero Hour" is the fourth episode from Season 8 of the military science fiction television series Stargate SG-1. It was written by producer Robert C. Cooper and directed by Peter Woeste. Clips of the episode were shown on Late Night with Conan O'Brien before Season 8 began, with Late Night graphic designer Pierre Bernard making a cameo appearance in the episode. The first airing of "Zero Hour" on July 30, 2004 on the American Sci Fi Channel was viewed by 3 million people. The episode received mixed reviews.

"Zero Hour" takes place shortly after the promotion of main character Jack O'Neill from Colonel to Brigadier General. With O'Neill being the new leader of Stargate Command (SGC), Lt. Col. Samantha Carter has assumed O'Neill's old position as leader of the SG-1 unit. The idea to have the episode focus on General O'Neill solving various problems at his new job came from the writers' wondering what the general of the SGC does while his teams are on missions.

== Plot ==
The episode takes place over the course of five days, counting down to an at first unrevealed event named "Zero Hour". Five days to Zero Hour, General O'Neill is introduced to his new administrative aide, Mark Gilmor, who makes a suspicious phone call. Meanwhile, O'Neill's new position as a general is twofold. He needs to decide decorations for an upcoming official visit, and prepare SG-1 for its next offworld trip. A quickly growing alien plant and the arrival of two brawly Amrans, possible trade partners from another world, lead O'Neill to write a letter to General Hammond, his predecessor.

At four days to Zero Hour, the alien plant has grown to cover many areas of the base. After SG-1 go missing on their off-world mission, a Goa'uld named Ba'al contacts Stargate Command and suggests an exchange of the captured SG-1 against Camulus, another Goa'uld who requested asylum on Earth several episodes before. With the help of Camulus, a potent power source is found and brought back to Stargate Command, only to find it tainted by Camulus (powering it up could result in the destruction of the Solar System). With the SGC suffering from a temporary electricity failure caused by the alien plants, Ba'al's renewed contacting only results in O'Neill's mocking. Exhausted by sleep deprivation two days to Zero Hour, O'Neill finishes his letter to General Hammond to inform him of his resignation.

Although Camulus leaves Earth, Ba'al does not send back SG-1. When all SG teams announce their trust and support for the general, SG-1 dial the Stargate from offworld, revealing that they were never captured by Ba'al but instead were trapped in a secret base. After their safe return, O'Neill attests new SG-1 leader Samantha Carter's positive leadership skills. It is revealed that the ZPM Camulus was given to supposedly kill Ba'al (which Ba'al would use to destroy Earth) was actually the dead one from Antarctica. Zero Hour makes up the last minutes of the episode. The President is about to arrive, and Gilmor announces that his special assignment, initiated by the President's order, will end the next day. Gilmor expresses his respect, and as they leave to greet the President, the camera zooms in on the resignation letter on O'Neill's desk, with the last words, "Never mind".

== Production ==
Despite being fourth in the airing order, "Zero Hour" was filmed as the seventh out of the twenty episodes of Season 8. The limited availability of Richard Dean Anderson (Jack O'Neill), who only worked 3.5 days out of five working days a week during the eighth season, extended the seven-day filming period to four weeks. With "Zero Hour" being a bottle episode to save money, director Peter Woeste filmed the majority of the episode on the standing SGC sets at The Bridge Studios, Vancouver, British Columbia, Canada. The labs of Dr. Lee and Carter were filmed in the same room of the standing set, and a storage room for filming equipment was remodeled into the office of Gilmor. Second unit director Andy Mikita was responsible for the off-world scenes of the SG teams, filmed in Tynehead Park, one of the few undeveloped Vancouver locations that still allows filming. O'Neill in his sleeping quarters was the episode's last filmed scene, shot in two takes to allow Anderson to catch his flight home to Los Angeles.

The inspiration for the episode came from the SG-1 writers wondering for years what George Hammond, the SGC leader from seasons one through seven, does while SG-1 is away on missions. Imagined scenarios ranged from the general dealing with minor decisions like bunting and lunch buffet, to averting major emergencies and threats. The episode's working title was "A Day in the Life of General O'Neill", but writer Robert C. Cooper felt "Zero Hour" was more appropriate, referring to the President's visit at the end of the episode. The subplot of the SGC being overrun with plant life originates in a Season 4 idea by writer and producer Brad Wright. To not interrupt the shooting process, the set was decorated with various plants and vines overnight. Some plants were plastic, but real plants were used for the torching scenes, sprayed to be flame retardant so as not to burn the whole set. Jim Menard as the director of photography was responsible for the green lighting when the emergency lighting goes off. He achieved depth by using differently-colored lights in the control room and near the gate.

"Zero Hour" features several guest stars. Los Angeles actor David Kaufman was brought in to play the part of Mark Gilmor, a red herring to the story. Cliff Simon, flown in from L.A. for a day's work, filmed most of his scenes as Ba'al against green-screen in the gateroom for a "hologram feel". Bill Dow (Dr. Lee) was doing theater work in Vancouver during the filming of this episode, necessitating the producers to schedule around his availability. Gary Jones's character, an SG-1 semi-regular technician who sported the name "Norman Davis" on his uniform for years, received a new name in this episode: "Walter Harriman". After O'Neill had referred to him as "Walter" in the Season 4 episode "2010", the producers could not get clearance for a renaming into "Walter Davis". The new name is based on General Hammond referring to Jones's character as "Airman" (sounding like "Harriman") in the pilot episode, and SG-1 writer Joseph Mallozzi explained the resulting incongruity as a married-name issue. One scene in "Zero Hour" features Pierre Bernard, a graphic designer for the NBC show Late Night with Conan O'Brien, as technician O'Brien. The SG-1 producers saw Bernard ranting on Late Night about Stargate SG-1 being better without Daniel Jackson (actor Michael Shanks was not part of SG-1 during Season 6), and gave him a cameo spot.

== Reception ==
Producer Robert C. Cooper was satisfied with "Zero Hour", claiming that Richard Dean Anderson "is fantastic in this episode. It's new-yet-classic O'Neill and fans of the character will be forever pleased with this." When "Zero Hour" first aired on the Sci Fi Channel on July 30, 2004, it achieved a 2.2 Household rating, equaling approximately 3 million viewers. Tied with "Icon", this marked the sixth-highest rating for any Season 8 episode of Stargate SG-1.

DVD Talk called "Zero Hour" "a playful episode" with a "funny sub-plot involving an alien plant", but recognized the episode's contribution to the overall story arc. TV Zone considered the plant threat "a nice change" but regretted that it was only a red herring for a later plot revelation. Bringing the plants to the SGC at all was regarded irritating, as the "obvious move [to build a secure lab on an uninhabited planet] doesn't make for such good drama." O'Neill acting as the new leader made "the Goa'uld threat [...] a laugh" and "an amazing change from the events from the series' early days" where O'Neill took this race more seriously. The actual zero hour plot concerning the "harassed" O'Neill was considered "a nice touch". Conan O'Brien, who had shown a clip of Pierre Bernard's scene in his late night show before the first airing, congratulated Bernard for doing a good job, and Bernard would be invited back to the Stargate SG-1 set for a scene in the 200th episode of the show.
