= Vasant Narkar =

Indian film and documentary director and writer

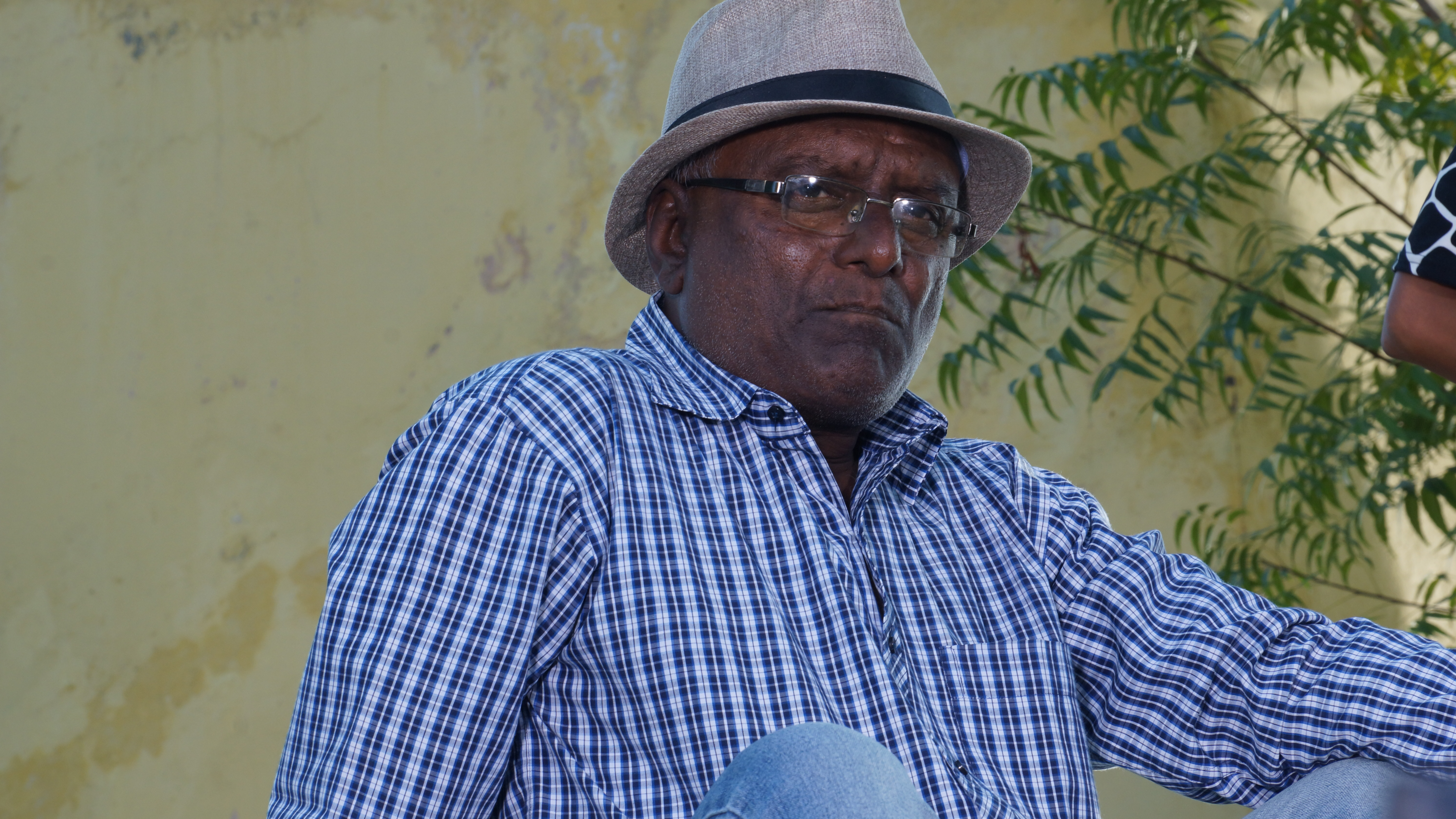
- Born: Ahmedabad, Gujarat, India
- Occupations: Film director, writer
- Parent(s): Dattatrey Narkar; Sulochna Narkar

Vasant Narkar is an Indian film and documentary director and writer. His work as a filmmaker includes the films The Lady Dabang, Odhani and Dikro Maro Vahal No Varasdaar.

== Early life and education ==
Narkar was born in Ahmedabad, Gujarat to a family from Maharashtra. As he grew up in Gujarat, his schooling was in Gujarati. Narkar was interested in becoming an actor when he was in 7th standard at school and enrolled in a college where there was a drama club.

== Career ==
Narkar has been in the Gujarati film industry for thirty years as an actor, writer, director and producer. In 2014 Narkar's movie The Lady Dabang was centred around its female lead, played by Gujarati actress Hemangini Kaj. In July 2015 the action comedy movie was directed by Narkar and produced by Shailesh Shah. In 2016 Narkar directed 3 November, his first film in Hindi.

== Filmography ==
=== Feature films ===
Year	Title	Language	Role
2016	3rd November	Hindi	Writer and director
2015	Dikro Maro Vahal No Varasdar	Gujarati	Director
2014	The Lady Dabang	Gujarati	Director
2014	Odhani	Gujarati	Director
2012	Boss Pappu Paas Thai Gayo	Gujarati	Editor, writer and director
2008	Shiv Vivha	Gujarati	Director

=== Television ===
Title	Episode	Channel	Notes
Kaki No 1	26	DD Girnar	Chief assistant director and writer
Umber	39	DD Girnar	Director and editor
Amaru Kaun?	26	DD Girnar	Director and editor
Satkatha	13	DD Girnar	Director and editor
AA Te Keva Sasu Vahu?	26	DD Girnar	Director and editor
Nidar Thai Leader	39	DD Girnar	Director and editor
Sambandho Sagar Paar Na	13	DD Girnar	Director and editor
Bakulnu Bakhadjantar	30	DD Girnar	Writer and director
Vahali Baa	30	Not Released	Writer, editor and director

=== Stage ===
Title	Notes
Vikruti	Writer, actor and producer
Chhinna- Bhinna	Writer, actor and director
Kheta To Kahevai Gayu	Writer, actor, director and producer
Take it Easy	Actor and director
Love Ma Lbw	Writer and director
Mane Parnavo Ek Chhokri	Director
Dikra De Taali	Director
