= Pierre Bernard (comedian) =

American comedian

- Born: Pierre Bernard, Jr.
- Notable work: Graphic designer for Late Night with Conan O'Brien, The Tonight Show with Conan O'Brien, Conan. Sgt. O'Brien in Stargate SG-1

Comedy career
- Medium: Television (predominantly)
- Genres: Sketch comedy, Physical comedy, Surreal humor
- Website: PierreBernardJr.com

Pierre Bernard, Jr. is an American graphic designer and comedian, most notable for his work on Late Night with Conan O'Brien, The Tonight Show with Conan O'Brien, and Conan. He had a recurring sketch called "Pierre Bernard's Recliner of Rage", where he would complain about issues that personally concern him while sitting in a recliner. The issues he complains about are typically esoteric in nature and mainly deal with comic books, anime, drawing or science fiction.

== Biography ==
Early in his career, Bernard did comic book lettering for major publishers, including Marvel Comics, DC Comics, Heavy Metal, Gold Key Comics, Playboy, Warren Publishing, and Blackthorne Publishing.

Bernard worked in the advertising and marketing field for such clients as DFS Dorland Worldwide, McCaffrey & McCall, Inc, and Newsweek magazine doing storyboards and comp presentations. At Prudential Securities he did various brochures and eventually took over their in-house magazine.

Bernard was the graphic designer for Conan. On Late Night with Conan O'Brien, Bernard appeared in a recurring sketch called "Pierre Bernard's Recliner of Rage".

Bernard has been a resident of Ewing Township, New Jersey.

== Notable appearances ==
=== Stargate SG-1 ===
One segment of Pierre Bernard's Recliner of Rage garnered Bernard a cult following in the Stargate SG-1 community. The initial segment was a complaint that Stargate SG-1 was better without Dr. Daniel Jackson (played by Michael Shanks). Shanks had left SG-1 after the fifth season only to return for the seventh season, and Bernard felt Jackson's involvement with the team averted too many action sequences.

After the SG-1 production team saw the sketch, they were so excited that Bernard gave SG-1 national TV publicity that they offered him an extra role on an episode of SG-1 as a technician named O'Brien (for Conan O'Brien). Bernard's filming process was recorded and aired as a remote segment on Late Night. When asked if he would return for another episode, he showed a clip where his character is shot after he greets an off-screen Dr. Jackson.

He was then invited to an SG-1 convention as a famous guest, which was also recorded and aired as a "remote" on Late Night. He then appeared in the 200th episode of SG-1, now as a zombied O'Brien, and is shot by a main character. In 2006, Pierre was interviewed by The Scifi World about his appearances on SG-1.

After the show was canceled, Pierre returned in another segment of Recliner complaining to the Sci Fi Network regarding the show's cancellation. In a later episode of the show, Conan O'Brien allows Pierre to come on the show and rant about the cancellation of Stargate SG-1. In a follow-up sketch to this rant, Conan announced that he would do Pierre a favor by having Jon Lovitz call the Sci Fi Channel to ask programming executive Mark Stern to reverse the cancellation.
