= Sunil Narkar =

Actor, writer, producer and philanthropist

- Born: September 30, 1961 (age 64); Mumbai, India
- Occupations: Actor, Writer, Producer, Director

Sunil Narkar is an Indian actor, writer, producer and philanthropist. He has acted for both mediums; television and movies. He is a member of the Screen Actors Guild, the American Federation of Television and Radio Artists, and the Indian Cultural Society of Los Angeles. He is the founder of the theater company named LA Dramatics.

== Acting career ==
Sunil made his first television appearance on Guinness World Records: Primetime in 1998 where he worked as an interpreter and translator as well. He later went to work in many TV shows like Cory in the House (2007), Boston Legal (2008), Jimmy Kimmel Live (2007 and 2009), 90210 (2011), New Girl (2013), Adopted (2015) and The Mindy Project (2015). He has also appeared in a few films, including: Road to the Altar (2009), Susan 313 (2012), Kings of Van Nuys (2012), Coffee Town (2013) and Pacific Rim (2013). Aside from the movies and television appearances, Sunil has been featured in some shorts as well.

In 2009 Sunil got his first full-length movie role, playing Akmal in the Road to the Altar. Furthermore, he played Kavi Sharma in the short film Outsourced. Sunil also appeared in a role in the NBC television program Outsourced in 2011.

In 2012 he appeared in a television movie, Susan 313, where he played a cab driver. Also in 2012, and also for a television movie, he played Rajeesh in Kings of Van Nuys. He played a journalist in the movie Pacific Rim.

In addition to television shows, movies and short films, Sunil has also appeared in a number of commercials for a variety of corporations like Chase (nationwide Spanish network), Walmart (which was a national television commercial in the US), Butterfinger (directed by Chris Litten), IBM, Intel Johnnie Walker (Black Label for Singapore Television), Candy Crush Saga Soda Worldwide Commercial (2014), "State Farm" State of Matrimony Commercial Directed by Mr. Sagar Rege (2014), "Samsung Galaxy S6 Edge" 'Unboxing: Parkour Tour' National Commercial (2013), "Nike" Skateboard National Television Commercial (2013) and "Cisco" Director Chris Smith National Television Commercial.

Sunil would return to acting after a brief hiatus in the 2026 music video "My Boy" by Rob Cantor, where he played the role of Cantor's son in place of his actual child.
