= The Tonight Show with Conan O'Brien =

American late-night talk show (2009–2010)

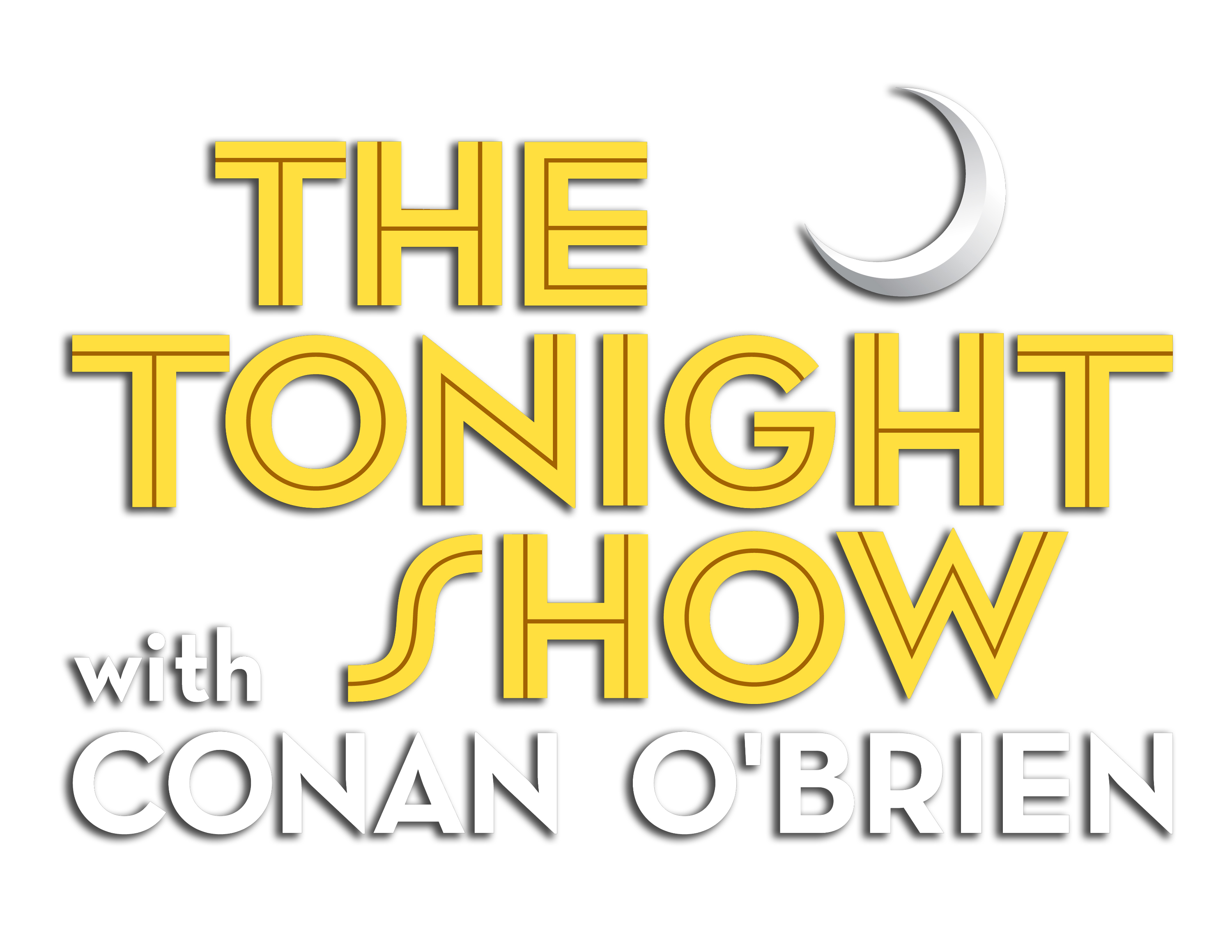
- Also known as: The Tonight Show (franchise brand)
- Genre: Late-night talk show; Variety show; Political satire
- Created by: Sylvester Weaver
- Developed by: Conan O'Brien
- Starring: Conan O'Brien
- Announcer: Andy Richter (sidekick)
- Music by: Max Weinberg and The Tonight Show Band
- Country of origin: United States
- Original language: English
- No. of episodes: 145 (1 not completed) (list of episodes)

Production
- Executive producers: Jeff Ross; Conan O'Brien
- Producers: Jordan Schlansky; Dan Fergusson
- Production locations: Universal Studios Stage 1; Universal City, California
- Camera setup: Multi-camera
- Running time: 62 minutes (with commercials)
- Production companies: Conaco; Universal Media Studios

Original release
- Network: NBC
- Release: June 1, 2009 – January 22, 2010

Related
- Late Night with Conan O'Brien; Conan

The Tonight Show with Conan O'Brien is an American television talk show broadcast by NBC. The show is the fifth installment of The Tonight Show, hosted by Conan O'Brien. It aired from June 1, 2009, to January 22, 2010, succeeding The Tonight Show with Jay Leno and ended when Leno returned to the role of Tonight Show host.

Many members of the Late Night cast and crew made the transition to The Tonight Show. The Max Weinberg 7, the house band from O'Brien's Late Night, served as the house band under the new name, Max Weinberg and The Tonight Show Band. Andy Richter returned to the show as announcer, and also began resuming his role as sidekick, after having left Late Night in 2000.

In January 2010, after the show had been on the air for seven months, it was announced that NBC was intending to move Jay Leno from primetime back to his original timeslot at 11:35 pm, with O'Brien's show starting shortly after midnight. In response to the announcement, O'Brien released a press statement saying that he would not continue as host of The Tonight Show if it was moved to any time after midnight to accommodate The Jay Leno Show. He feared it would ruin the long and rich tradition of The Tonight Show, which had been on after the late local newscasts from the beginning. After two weeks of negotiations, NBC announced that they had paid $45 million to buy out O'Brien's contract, ending both his tenure as host as well as his relationship with NBC after 22 years.

Conan O'Brien's final Tonight Show was broadcast on January 22, 2010, with Jay Leno officially resuming his role as host on March 1, 2010, immediately following the conclusion of the 2010 Winter Olympics. It later received four Primetime Emmy nominations, including Outstanding Variety, Music or Comedy Series, the first time The Tonight Show received a nomination for this particular award after 2003.

At only 146 episodes (145 aired) over the course of seven months and three weeks, it is the shortest-running iteration in the sixty-year history of The Tonight Show.

== Format ==
The show followed the established six-piece format used by previous hosts Jay Leno and Johnny Carson, as well as elements established by O'Brien during his tenure on Late Night. The first segment included a monologue by O'Brien, sometimes accompanied by altered news clips, or several brief comedy sketches. Most episodes also included a second segment, immediately after the monologue, with a full comedy sketch. An interview with either one or two guests followed, as well as a musical or comedy performance.

After the last performance segment, O'Brien walked on camera to thank the performers, bid farewell to the audience, and recommend watching Late Night with Jimmy Fallon. For the first six shows, the credits ran in the right half of a split screen, a former NBC standard that Late Night continued to use long after the network abandoned it. After episode seven, NBC's current practice of running credits at the bottom third of the screen was employed. The Conaco and Universal Media Studios production tags were then shown in full-screen.

=== Sketches and comedy bits ===
New sketches included O'Brien posing for the paparazzi, known as "Conan's Tabloid Moment", and "Twitter Tracker", where an excited announcer reads mundane "tweets" by celebrities such as Ashton Kutcher, Miley Cyrus, and Dennis Haysbert. Sketches from Late Night reintroduced include "In the Year 2000" as "In the Year 3000", with Richter once again assisting Conan on the sketch, and "Celebrity Surveys". Late Night character Triumph the Insult Comic Dog appeared on Tonight for the first time on June 19, 2009, serving as correspondent for the Bonnaroo Music Festival in Tennessee. Another favorite character from Conan's old show, the Masturbating Bear, was also reintroduced on January 20, 2010, on Conan's third-to-last show. O'Brien originally retired the Masturbating Bear at the end of his Late Night run due to concerns about its inappropriateness in the 11:30 time slot. Late Night character The Interrupter made his first appearance on The Tonight Show on September 3, 2009.

=== Musical/comedy guests ===
As is the format on other late night talk shows, the last segment typically featured a performance by either a musical guest or a stand-up comedian, preceding the closing credits to the show. An avid guitar player, O'Brien has been given many guitars as gifts from several musical guests and on occasion, featured himself on acoustic guitar in a comedy sketch. He also played electric guitar during the final episode's cover performance of Lynyrd Skynyrd's "Free Bird".

== Production ==
The Tonight Show with Conan O'Brien originated from Stage 1 at Universal Studios Hollywood in Universal City, California, a stage that was specifically built and constructed for O'Brien's version of The Tonight Show. The set was designed in art deco style with multi-colored art deco murals along the top of the set. The studio was previously used for Jack Benny's television show. This was the first time since before May 1972, when Johnny Carson served as host, that the show was not shot in Burbank, California.

As with a majority of television shows produced and broadcast by NBC Universal, the show was shot in 16:9 aspect ratio, with a 4:3 center-cut, and broadcast in 1080i high definition. O'Brien's entire tenure on the show was the first version of The Tonight Show to be recorded, taped, and broadcast exclusively in high definition.

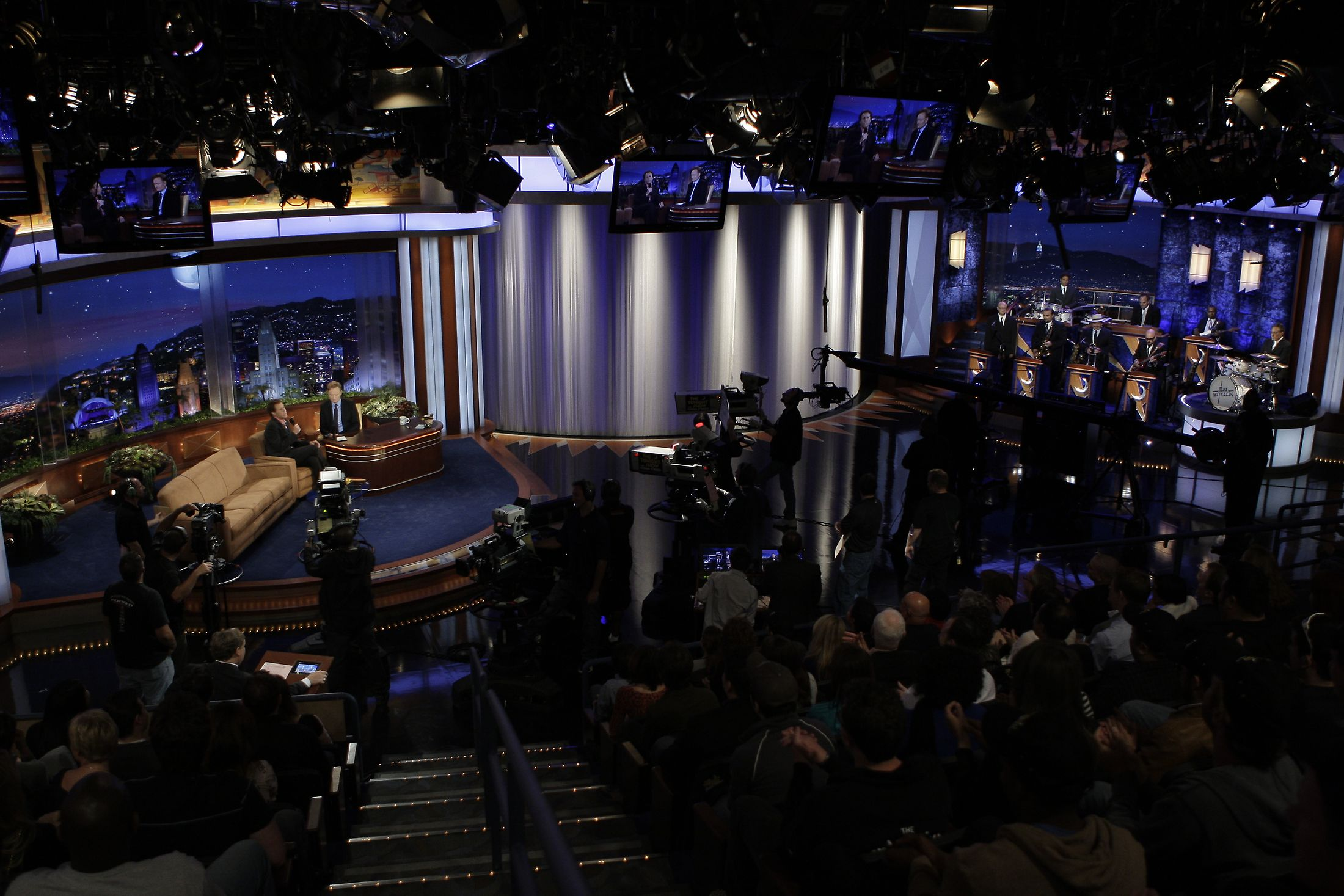
View from an audience seat

The show was shot with 9 cameras and 8 camera operators, using several Sony HDC-1500 cameras with added two Canon DigiSuper 27XS and one Canon DigiSuper 72XS (for guest close-ups) box lenses.

Unlike Leno's Tonight Show, the studio audience was several feet removed from the stage, in a similar fashion to Carson's original set. Leno retained Carson's original configuration (and set design) until he changed studios in 1995.

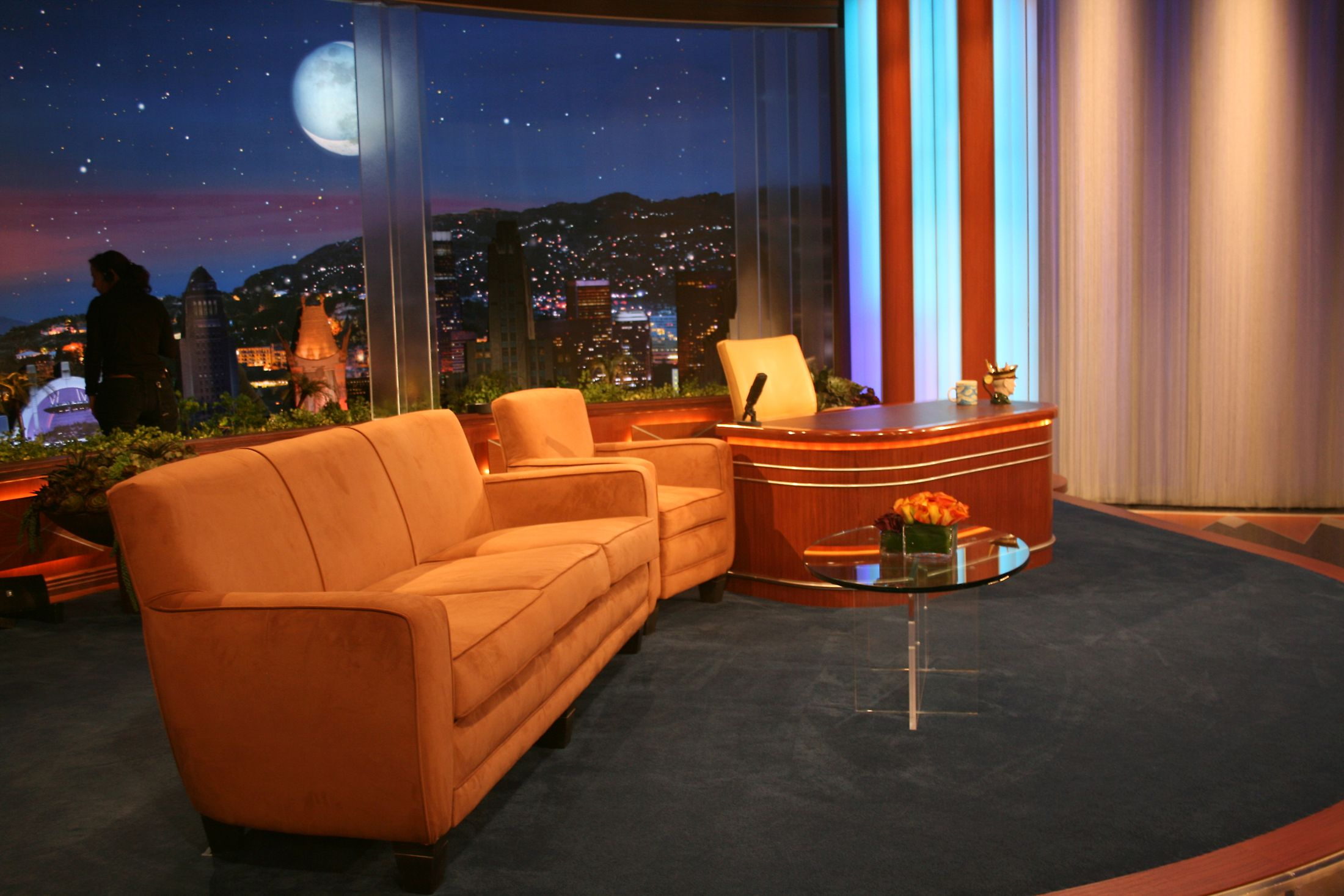
Home base of the show

The stage layout was opposite of the structure used on Late Night. Where Studio 6A was arranged with the house band on the far left, followed by the performance area and then the interview set, the house band was moved to the right of the performance stage on Tonight, with the interview set now on the far left.

From 2012 until 2014, Stage 1 was the home of Chelsea Lately, which aired on E!, a channel owned by NBCUniversal.

== History ==
The Tonight Show with Conan O'Brien title card

In a high-profile announcement by NBC on September 27, 2004, it was officially declared that Conan O'Brien would take over as host of The Tonight Show in 2009, replacing Jay Leno, ending a seventeen-year run by Leno. This was accompanied by reports that Jay Leno had told Jeff Zucker, the President of NBC Entertainment, News & Cable Group, of his plans to retire that same year. Leno immediately explained on his show the following night that in having Conan take over the show, and announcing it years before the transition would take place, that he wanted to avoid the hardship that he had experienced in the dispute over retiring Johnny Carson's hosting duties between him and David Letterman in 1992. Further commenting about the announcement, Leno made it clear that Conan was "certainly the most deserving person for the job." However, in 2008, while Leno was beginning to bring his show to a close, it was announced that Leno had changed his mind about retiring and would instead host a new prime-time variety show on NBC. The Jay Leno Show aired weeknights at 10:00 pm from September 14, 2009, until the show's cancellation on February 9, 2010.

=== The first show ===
The guests for Conan O'Brien's first week as host were announced on May 22, 2009, with the first episode of The Tonight Show with Conan O'Brien including actor and comedian Will Ferrell, in addition to a musical performance of the song "Got Some" by guest Pearl Jam.

Will Ferrell was O'Brien's first and last guest (first interview pictured) during the show's run.

The show's opening began with a nod to The Tonight Show Starring Johnny Carson, beginning with the classic "Laramie Peacock" logo used during the 1960s and 1970s, and the announcement that "the following program is brought to you in living color, on NBC", a slogan that would be readopted by NBC soon after.

In the cold open, O'Brien was shown preparing to host his first episode of The Tonight Show, going over a list of things that needed to be done, but realizing he was still in New York and had forgotten to move to Los Angeles. After trying, and failing, to catch a taxi cab, Conan ran across the country through such places as Amish Country, Wrigley Field in Chicago, the Gateway Arch in St. Louis, the Teton Range, Las Vegas and the deserts of Arizona before arriving at Universal Studios Hollywood to host the show.

Upon arrival, Conan realized he left the keys to the new studio in New York and then drove a bulldozer through the door and wall of the studio to get in. The Cheap Trick song "Surrender" was played over this sketch.

Other filmed sketches in the first episode included a trip through the streets of Los Angeles on the Universal Studios tram, a ride through Hollywood with Conan behind the wheel of his 1992 Ford Taurus SHO, and a short gag showing Conan in the back row of a Los Angeles Lakers playoff game at Staples Center.

=== Other notable episodes ===
On June 23, 2009, the show's first segment ended with a tribute to former Tonight Show announcer and sidekick Ed McMahon, who had died earlier in the day. Memorable clips from McMahon's tenure as Johnny Carson's sidekick were shown, with O'Brien and Andy Richter also paying tribute to McMahon, and bidding him a final farewell.

On September 23, 2009, during his opening monologue, O'Brien told a very brief joke about Newark, and a supposed health care program for the city's citizens that would involve Newark giving them a bus ticket out of the city. Newark mayor Cory Booker responded in a satirical YouTube video calling for O'Brien to apologize, and that Conan would be banned from ever entering Newark Liberty International Airport until doing so. Conan responded by further making fun of Newark, however, saying the only way he could get to Newark now would be like everyone else, "through a series of poor decisions." He also called out Cory Booker to come on the show to air out their grievances, deciding to then ban Booker from Burbank airport, adding later that he had absolutely no power to do so. Booker subsequently banned Conan from the state of New Jersey as well as all the sister cities of Newark. In response, O'Brien read a letter on air from Elizabeth, New Jersey mayor Chris Bollwage, declaring that he will temporarily rename Terminal A of Newark Liberty (which lies in Elizabeth) the Conan O'Brien Terminal. Conan continued, saying he had created a "geographic toilet seat" around Newark. The mayors of Bayonne, East Orange, Kearny, Jersey City, and Elizabeth have publicly sided with Conan O'Brien. He ended this by saying, "Your move, Mayor Booker." The feud was unofficially ended when Secretary of State Hillary Clinton called for it to end during a prepared comedy bit, telling Booker to "chalk it up" to Conan. The following week Conan announced that Cory Booker would be a guest on the October 16, 2009, show to mend the feud. That night, O'Brien and his wife donated $50,000 to the Newark Now Organization, and NBC Universal matched Conan's donation to total a $100,000 gift. Booker also admitted that he is a big Conan fan and often tapes shows to watch the next day or watches them on the website Hulu.

On September 25, 2009, O'Brien suffered from a mild concussion after he slipped and hit his head while running a race, as part of a comedy sketch, with guest Teri Hatcher. He was examined at a hospital and released the same day. A rerun was aired that night, but O'Brien returned to work the following Monday and poked fun at the incident, before showing a clip of the occurrence in its entirety. The episode was never completed. Second guest Seth MacFarlane and musical guest Rodrigo y Gabriela returned the next week, however.

=== Ratings ===
Highly promoted prior to its premiere on the late night scene, the debut episode of The Tonight Show with Conan O'Brien generated 9.2 million viewers overall and a 3.8 rating in adults 18-49. Ratings for the debut episode were higher than both CBS's Late Show with David Letterman and ABC's Nightline combined, with a 7.1 rating and a 17 audience share. In comparison, the final show with Leno averaged an 8.8 rating in metered-market households. During the rest of O'Brien's premiere week, ratings dropped each day, from a 5.0 on Tuesday to a 3.5 on Friday, though the latter still exceeded that evening's 2.7 rating for Late Show.

On June 9, 2009, Late Show had rated better than The Tonight Show with a 3.4 rating to 2.9 rating. It was the first time in over eight months that Letterman rated better than his NBC counterpart. Tonight would end up winning week two, however, with O'Brien garnering 850,000 more viewers than Late Show with David Letterman in the 18–49 demographic, plus 650,000 more viewers in the 18–34 demographic and 550,000 more in the 25–54 demographic.

The week before the death of Michael Jackson saw Letterman attract a larger audience than O'Brien, with The Tonight Show audience measuring as the smallest in the franchise's history, "3.3 million viewers, about two million fewer than Jay Leno's average as host." The following week, O'Brien's total viewership was even lower, averaging 2.8 million; among viewers 25-to-54, he tied with Letterman, the first time O'Brien failed to win that demographic since he had become host. However, The New York Times noted that the coverage of Jackson's death had placed Nightline ahead of both Letterman and O'Brien that week. By the week ending August 7, repeats of The Late Show were also beating O'Brien, albeit with the thinnest of margins—the repeats got a 2.1/6 household rating and 2.95 million total viewers, vs. The Tonight Show's 2.0/5 rating and 2.94 million viewers; both were beaten that week by Nightline's 3.25 million.

Although there were suggestions that O'Brien's greatest strength, the "young men" demographic, could be more easily reached "on Web sites and cable channels like Comedy Central and Spike", advertisers and network executives alike pointed out that the first real test would come in September 2009. Pulitzer Prize-winning critic Tom Shales also pointed out in August 2009 that O'Brien was "in much better shape than Leno was at the beginning." O'Brien's strength was also strong among low income inner city viewers, and had always beaten Letterman by a large margin among that demographic. O' Brien also received very high ratings over Letterman among African American and Hispanic viewers, which was very unusual for a white host. Prior to Conan's tenure African American and Hispanic viewers were usually split among Leno and Letterman.

By November 2009, two months after the premiere of The Jay Leno Show in September, ratings for The Tonight Show were down "roughly two million viewers a night year-to-year" from when Leno hosted the program. Though cheaper to produce than the scripted dramas it replaced, Leno's new prime time talk show generated fewer lead-in viewers for local news programs, causing a domino effect on ratings for The Tonight Show and Late Night with Jimmy Fallon.

On January 12, 2010, in response to the controversy of the late-night schedule change, O'Brien's ratings grew to 1.7 rating/7 share among adults 18–49, up 40 percent from the previous day. On Thursday, January 14, 2010, Conan garnered a 1.9 rating. His last show garnered his best ratings with a 4.8 rating with adults 18–49 and 40 percent better than the 3.4 rating with adults 18–49 Jay Leno got in his last show on May 29, 2009.

=== Dispute over timeslot and host ===
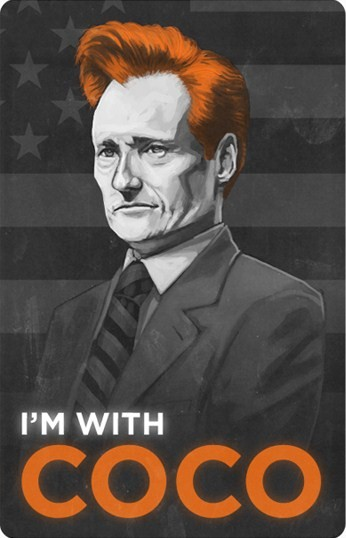
O'Brien quickly gained public support when it was revealed NBC was considering moving The Tonight Show to a later time.

On January 7, 2010, multiple media outlets reported that beginning March 1, 2010, Jay Leno would move from his 10 pm weeknight time slot to 11:35 pm, due to a combination of pressure from affiliates and both Leno's and O'Brien's poor ratings. The plan would have Leno's show shortened from an hour to 30 minutes. All NBC late night programming would be preempted by the 2010 Winter Olympics between February 15 and 26; a final decision about the programming changes was made by NBC on January 10. O'Brien's contract stipulated that NBC could move the show back to 12:05 am without penalty (a clause put in primarily to accommodate sports preemptions), leaving him with no apparent recourse other than resignation.

On January 10, NBC confirmed they would move Jay Leno out of primetime on February 12, and intended to move him to late-night as soon as possible. TMZ reported that O'Brien was given no advance notice of the change, and that NBC offered two choices: the hour-long 12:05 am time slot, or the option to leave the network. If O'Brien did choose to leave, Leno would likely regain the Tonight Show title as well as the full 11:35 pm to 12:35 am time slot. Another possibility was that NBC could pay O'Brien to refrain from working for another network, remain off-air, then have him resume as host once Leno retires. The day after the change was announced, The New York Times spoke with an anonymous FOX executive, who said that the company felt O'Brien "would be a great fit for Fox." ABC had stated they felt no need to add O'Brien to their late night schedule, which already contained Nightline and Jimmy Kimmel Live!.

On January 12, O'Brien issued a press release that stated he would not continue with the NBC program if it moves to a 12:05 am time slot, saying, "I believe that delaying The Tonight Show into the next day to accommodate another comedy program will seriously damage what I consider to be the greatest franchise in the history of broadcasting. The Tonight Show at 12:05 simply isn't the Tonight Show. Also, if I accept this move I will be knocking the Late Night show, which I inherited from David Letterman and passed on to Jimmy Fallon, out of its long-held time slot. That would hurt the other NBC franchise that I love, and it would be unfair to Jimmy." In the same statement, O'Brien pointed out the lack of support from the network and lead-in prime time ratings: "It was my mistaken belief that, like my predecessor, I would have the benefit of some time and, just as important, some degree of ratings support from the prime-time schedule. Building a lasting audience at 11:30 is impossible without both."

On January 15, All Headline News reported that NBC intended to keep Conan off the air completely for three and a half years, without pay, unless he agreed to NBC's terms. Insiders for both NBC and O'Brien reportedly dismissed the notion as "ludicrous": "He has two and a half years left on his deal. How would they even do that?" NBCUniversal chief Jeff Zucker made the threat with the belief that O'Brien's contract contained a clause that allowed the network to bench him for an additional one year after his contract expires. An insider on O'Brien's side claimed that NBC would be in breach of an addendum to the contract if The Tonight Show was moved to a later time slot.

The New York Times reported online support was overwhelmingly in favor of O'Brien; in the days following the switch announcement, 88% of related Twitter posts expressed support for O'Brien. Tens of thousands of Facebook posts were made siding with O'Brien, and thousands joined various "Team Conan" or "I'm with Coco" groups. Dozens of celebrities expressed support for O'Brien, including Roger Ebert, Tom Hanks, Rosie O'Donnell, Jim Gaffigan, Paul F. Tompkins, Doug Benson, Ahmir "Questlove" Thompson, Alyssa Milano, Chris Parnell, Jimmy Kimmel, Jeff Garlin, and Ricky Gervais. Actor and comedian Patton Oswalt expressly backed O'Brien, saying, "Comedians who don't like Jay Leno now, and I'm one of them, we're not like, 'Jay Leno sucks'; it's that we're so hurt and disappointed that one of the best comedians of our generation... willfully has shut the switch off."

In a 2010 issue of TV Guide, the timeslot dispute ranked No. 1 on a list of TV's biggest "blunders".

=== Settlement with NBC and O'Brien's departure ===
After two weeks of negotiations, on January 21, 2010, it was officially announced that Conan O'Brien had signed a $45 million deal to leave NBC altogether, ending a partnership that lasted 22 years. The Wall Street Journal reported that O'Brien would receive about $32 million, executive producer Jeff Ross $4.5 million, and the rest of the staff around $7.5 million. The deal did not, however, contain a previously rumored "mitigation clause", in which NBC would be able to keep some of the severance pay after O'Brien found a new program. It also stipulated that O'Brien could freely return to television as early as September 1, 2010, on another network.

The network confirmed that Leno would officially resume as host of The Tonight Show on March 1, 2010, following the 2010 Winter Olympics coverage on NBC. Reruns of episodes from O'Brien's time continued to air until the beginning of NBC's coverage of the Olympics in February 2010.

=== Final week of shows ===
Once it was made public that January 22 would likely be O'Brien's last Tonight Show episode, a number of big name guests were booked for the final few shows, including Martin Scorsese, Quentin Tarantino, Robin Williams and Adam Sandler. Musical guests for the final week included Spoon and Barry Manilow. The guests for the final episode were Tom Hanks, Will Ferrell, and musical guest Neil Young. Ferrell bookended the show by being O'Brien's first and last guest. Tom Hanks was the final interview of both O'Brien's Tonight Show and David Letterman's Late Night.

In addition, a number of other unannounced celebrities "dropped by" during various segments of the show. On January 13, Jack McBrayer appeared briefly in character as NBC page Kenneth Parcell from 30 Rock. He interrupted O'Brien's monologue while giving a guided tour around the studio, quipping, "NBC spent more time building this studio than using it." On January 19, Norm Macdonald walked onstage with a large congratulatory gift basket he had procrastinated on giving O'Brien since June. He read aloud from the greeting card, "Congratulations Conan on finally securing your place as permanent host of The Tonight Show. That's something they can never take away from you." Ed Helms appeared on January 20, performing "Stu's Song" from The Hangover with altered lyrics that remarked upon O'Brien's current troubles. Ben Stiller and Paul Reubens (in character as Pee-wee Herman) made brief unannounced stops on the January 21 show. On the last show, Steve Carell made a cameo appearance as an NBC employee conducting O'Brien's exit interview.

The January 20 episode included a comedic bit in which O'Brien unveiled a Bugatti Veyron dressed as a mouse, while the song "(I Can't Get No) Satisfaction" by The Rolling Stones played in the background. O'Brien claimed that the car and music licensing fees ("not to mention the rights to re-air this clip on the Internet") would cost NBC $1.5 million. It was later revealed that the car was on loan from the Petersen Automotive Museum. The segment was subsequently cut from Internet versions of the episode that were uploaded to Hulu and NBC.com, presumably so the network could avoid paying the licensing fees required for the Rolling Stones song.

The "expensive" comedy bit continued on January 21, featuring 2009 Kentucky Derby winner Mine That Bird wearing a mink Snuggie watching restricted Super Bowl footage, which O'Brien claimed cost NBC $4.8 million. The final episode upped the ante further with a purported $65 million sketch, featuring a credit card-purchased fossil skeleton of a ground sloth from the Smithsonian Institution spraying Beluga caviar through a hose onto an original Picasso painting. In response to the Internet community's outcry over the expense of these sketches, O'Brien explained that the segments were a joke.

The televised airing extended into January 23, which coincidentally marked the five-year anniversary of Johnny Carson's death. Before introducing the final segment, a performance of "Free Bird", O'Brien gave a statement to the viewers and audience, which included a personal thank you to NBC (the first time he expressed gratitude to the network since the controversy began) and his devoted fanbase:

Ladies and gentlemen, before we bring this rodeo to a close, I think a couple things should be said. There's been a lot of speculation in the press, about what I legally can and can't say about NBC, and, this isn't a joke, to set the record straight, and this is true, tonight I'm allowed to say anything I want. [...] Tonight I really am allowed to say whatever I want, and what I want to say is this: Between my time at Saturday Night Live, the Late Night show, and my brief run here on The Tonight Show, I've worked with NBC for over twenty years. Yes, we have our differences right now, yes, we're going our separate ways, but this company has been my home for most of my adult life. I am enormously proud of the work we have done together, and I want to thank NBC for making it all possible, I really do.

A lot of people have been asking me about my state of mind, I'll be honest with you, walking away from The Tonight Show is the hardest thing I have ever had to do. Making this choice has been enormously difficult. This is the best job in the world. I absolutely love doing it, and I have the best staff and crew in the history of the medium. I will fight anybody who says I don't [...] but no one would. But despite this sense of loss, I really feel this should be a happy moment. Every comedian, every comedian dreams of hosting The Tonight Show, and —for seven months— I got to do it. And, I did it my way, with people I love. I do not regret one second of anything that we've done here.

I encounter people when I walk on the street now, who are just [...] who give me sort of a sad look; I have had more good fortune than anybody I know. And if our next gig is doing a show in a 7-Eleven parking lot, we will find a way to make it fun, we really will, I will have no problems. I don't want to do it in a 7-Eleven parking lot, but whatever.

Finally, I have something to say to our fans. This massive outpouring of support, and passion from so many people has been overwhelming for me. The rallies, the signs, all this goofy, outrageous creativity on the Internet. The fact that people have traveled long distances, and camped out all night, in the pouring rain [...] to be in our audience.

Here's what all of you have done: you made a sad situation joyous and inspirational. So to all the people watching, I can never, ever thank you enough for the kindness to me, I'll think about it for the rest of my life, and all I ask is one thing, and I'm asking this particularly of young people that watch:

Please do not be cynical. I hate cynicism. For the record, it's my least favorite quality, it doesn't lead anywhere. Nobody in life gets exactly what they thought they were going to get. But if you work really hard and you're kind, amazing things will happen. I'm telling you, amazing things will happen. I'm telling you, it's just true!

— Conan O'Brien, in his final statement.

The final episode featured a reel of highlights from the show's short run, ending with the words, "To Be Continued.", indicating that he will be on another network. When introduced, Tom Hanks brought out two glasses of "scotch", later revealed to be cream soda. Neil Young performed an acoustic version of his song "Long May You Run", and the show ended with Will Ferrell dressed as Ronnie Van Zant playing the cowbell in a nod to his famous role in the More cowbell sketch, Ferrell's pregnant wife Viveca Paulin, Billy Gibbons, Ben Harper, Beck, O'Brien himself, and Max Weinberg and The Tonight Show Band performing "Free Bird".

=== Content removal controversy ===
Roughly two weeks after O'Brien's final episode (repeats of previous shows, however, continued to appear until February 11, just before the network's coverage of the 2010 Winter Olympics), NBC began removing all videos of The Tonight Show with Conan O'Brien from its website, as well as from the streaming video site Hulu. Gather.com reported that NBC intends to scrub all O'Brien-related Tonight Show and Late Night clips from YouTube making it incredibly difficult to find any videos of Conan's history with The Tonight Show other than his farewell speech, among other clips. Time magazine criticized the network for pulling the videos, noting that Hulu currently streams many less popular NBC series, such as Knight Rider, Kings, Crusoe, and Surface.

In February 2010, NBC took O'Brien's official website offline, and removed all mentions of the former host from NBC.com. Around the same time, HornyManatee.com, a URL launched by O'Brien's Late Night show as part of a sketch, began redirecting to NBC.com. In early February 2010, O'Brien's face in the 30 Rockefeller Plaza mural was replaced by Jay Leno's likeness. The NBC "Tonight Show Experience" website which originally featured media on all of the past hosts was also removed of all content. More recently mention of O'Brien has been restored to the site. Every search result in O'Brien's name on NBC.com only produced links to the 30 Rock episode "Tracy Does Conan" – in which O'Brien guest stars – and the farewells to O'Brien during the episode of Late Night with Jimmy Fallon which aired after O'Brien's last Tonight Show.

Critics have also called into question promotions broadcast in early March 2010 for an upcoming appearance by former vice-presidential candidate Sarah Palin on Leno's Tonight Show in which it was claimed that she had never made a late-night talk show appearance before—despite her appearing on the Conan O'Brien Tonight Show on December 11, 2009. Nikki Finke, a blogger for the Deadline Hollywood website, cited this as more evidence of NBC attempting to erase any remnants of the O'Brien era. Sarah Palin also appeared on The Late Late Show with Craig Ferguson and Jimmy Kimmel Live!, but neither of those appearances was an interview.

One O'Brien reference that NBC did not filter out was in the April 1, 2010 episode of The Marriage Ref, with Late Night host Jimmy Fallon on the panel. While watching a clip of a married couple arguing about the husband's odd marionette collection, Fallon pointed out two marionettes in the background that resembled him and Conan (to which the mentioning of his name received great applause), saying the husband owned the "NBC Late Night Marionette" collection. O'Brien was also mentioned on the first season finale of the NBC series Community, when the character Starburns yelled out that NBC should "bring back Conan."

=== Mentioning of O'Brien on Leno's Tonight Show ===
On the April 6, 2010 episode of The Tonight Show with Jay Leno, guitarist Slash performed the song "By the Sword" with Andrew Stockdale, lead singer of Wolfmother, the first single from Slash's self-titled debut solo album. During the performance, there were very few close-ups of Slash. TMZ reported that this was because Slash was wearing a pin depicting Mike Mitchell's "I'm With Coco" poster during the performance, which they illustrated with a closeup still showing the pin.

On the May 5, 2010 episode of The Tonight Show with Jay Leno, a gag involving Times Square bombing suspect Faisal Shahzad's fictional Facebook page mentioned "Team Coco" under his Favorites section, becoming one of the first jabs at O'Brien (though not mentioned out loud) by Leno.

On the June 2010 episode, comedian Chris Rock made an appearance. During the interview, he made a few subtle references to O'Brien's stint as host and went on to call Leno a "bad, bad man."

On the June 2010 episode, guest Denis Leary stated that he had created a Twitter account because he heard Conan O'Brien got one. Leno mentioned that he also has a Twitter account. The comment and the question were not present in clips of the interview on the NBC website.

On the July 8, 2010 episode, immediately after the 2010 Emmy nominations were announced, Leno indirectly referred to The Tonight Show under O'Brien by quipping that the good news was that The Tonight Show had been nominated for four Emmys. The bad news was that none of them were his. On the July 9 episode, Jay showed an altered tape of him interviewing LeBron James. When Leno asked James if he had chosen a team, James held up a poster reading "Team CoCo", to which Leno said, "Well, he did get four nominations."

=== 2010 Primetime Emmy nominations ===
On July 8, 2010, The Tonight Show with Conan O'Brien was nominated for a Primetime Emmy Award for Outstanding Variety, Music or Comedy Series; the comparison was made by most media outlets that neither Jay Leno's version of Tonight nor The Jay Leno Show, both of which were also submitted for consideration, received a nomination in the category.

Other 2010 Primetime Emmy nominations include Outstanding Art Direction in a Variety, Music, or Nonfiction Programming, Outstanding Directing for a Variety, Music, or Comedy Series and Outstanding Writing for a Variety, Music, or Comedy Series.

The writing and directing categories in which O'Brien's Tonight Show was nominated have been cut from the Emmy broadcast due to a deal that the Emmys reached with the WGA and DGA last year to alternate between the writing and directing awards for Variety, Music, or Comedy Series and Variety, Music, or Comedy Specials. These have been moved to the Creative Emmys broadcast, however fans have been mounting a campaign to get at least the writing award for series back on the prime time Emmys broadcast.

At the Creative Arts Emmys, The Tonight Show failed to win any of the three awards they were up for that night. The Tonight Show also failed to win the Emmy for Outstanding Variety, Music or Comedy Series, losing to The Daily Show.

=== 2014 transfer of The Tonight Show to Jimmy Fallon ===
A short clip (less than one second in length) of O'Brien appeared in an early promo for Fallon's Tonight Show, which portrayed Fallon as the latest custodian of a 60-year-old franchise and featured all Tonight hosts of the past, most prominently Carson and Leno. In interviews, Fallon has included O'Brien when referring to Tonight history, noting himself as the sixth host in succession (counting Leno only once, and not counting the hosts during the show's brief incarnation as a newsmagazine in 1957).

While alluding to (and joking about) the 2010 controversy many times over his last few weeks on the air, Leno did not directly acknowledge his seven- month absence from the franchise, nor did he acknowledge O'Brien by name as he concluded his tenure as host. During the February 6 episode of Conan, which aired the same night as Leno's final episode, O'Brien referenced Leno in his monologue by mentioning the start of the 2014 Winter Olympics, saying that "NBC will finally get to show someone who is okay with passing the torch". Following applause from the audience, O'Brien said, "I allowed myself one, but it was a good one."

The Tonight Show Starring Jimmy Fallon premiered on February 17, 2014. Fallon told a couple of jokes during his first Tonight Show monologue that referred to the Conan/Leno fiasco. He said in his monologue, "Welcome, I'm Jimmy Fallon and I will be your host... for now!" – taking a jab at the situation O'Brien went through. Fallon continued his monologue, saying, "Of course I wouldn't be here tonight if it weren't for the previous Tonight Show hosts, so I want to say 'thank you' to Steve Allen, Jack Paar, Johnny Carson, Jay Leno, Conan O'Brien, and Jay Leno."

On April 3, 2024, it was announced that O'Brien would appear as a guest on Fallon's Tonight Show on April 9 to promote his upcoming series Conan O'Brien Must Go. This marks O'Brien's first proper appearance on the show since exiting his own version in 2010, though he appeared in a pre-taped sketch alongside Fallon and Stephen Colbert in 2018.

== Awards and nominations ==
Year	Award	Organization	Work	Notes	Category	Recipients	Result
2010	Emmy Award	Academy of Television Arts & Sciences	The Tonight Show with Conan O'Brien	Episode #1.1	Outstanding Art Direction for Variety, Music or Nonfiction Programming	John Shaffner, Joe Stewart, Christopher Goumas, NBC	Nominated
2010	Emmy Award	Academy of Television Arts & Sciences	The Tonight Show with Conan O'Brien		Outstanding Variety, Music or Comedy Series	NBC	Nominated
2010	Emmy Award	Academy of Television Arts & Sciences	The Tonight Show with Conan O'Brien	Episode #1.46	Outstanding Directing for a Variety, Music or Comedy Series	Allan Kartun	Nominated
2010	Emmy Award	Academy of Television Arts & Sciences	The Tonight Show with Conan O'Brien	Episode #1.46	Outstanding Writing for a Variety, Music or Comedy Series	Mike Sweeney, Conan O'Brien, Chris Albers, Jose Arroyo, Deon Cole, Josh Comers, Dan Cronin, Kevin Dorff, Andres Du Bouchet, Michael Gordon, Berkley Johnson, Brian Kiley, Rob Kutner, Todd Levin, Brian McCann, Guy Nicolucci, Matt O'Brien, Andy Richter, Brian Stack, Andrew Weinberg, NBC	Nominated
2010	WGA Award	Writers Guild of America	The Tonight Show with Conan O'Brien		Comedy/Variety – (Including Talk) Series	Mike Sweeney, Chris Albers, Jose Arroyo, Josh Comers, Dan Cronin, Kevin Dorff, Andres du Bouchet, Michael Gordon, Berkley Johnson, Brian Kiley, Rob Kutner, Todd Levin, Brian McCann, Guy Nicolucci, Conan O'Brien, Matt O'Brien, Andy Richter, Brian Stack, Andrew Weinberg	Nominated
