= Primetime Emmy Award for Outstanding Writing for a Variety Series =

Award for variety series writing

Primetime Emmy Award for Outstanding Writing for Variety Series
- Awarded for: Outstanding Writing for Variety Special
- Country: United States
- Presented by: Academy of Television Arts & Sciences
- Currently held by: The Late Show with Stephen Colbert (2026)
- Website: emmys.com

The Primetime Emmy Award for Outstanding Writing for a Variety Series debuted in 1966 and has been awarded most years since. Generally the award has recognized writers of variety and sketch comedy shows. Exceptions include the years 1969, 1970, and 1979 when it served as the main category for writers of situation comedies. Prior to 1966, variety series competed in the category Outstanding Writing for a Comedy Series where The Red Skelton Show and others were only occasionally nominated.

The category has undergone several name changes, mostly involving the addition or removal of the word comedy. This includes, in the late 70's, the unwieldy Outstanding Writing In A Comedy Or Comedy-Variety Or Music Series. The category name eventually found greater stability when, in 1982, it settled on Outstanding Writing for a Variety or Music Program. That name lasted almost two decades until 2000 when the word comedy was added. The current name dates from 2012.

From 1971 to 1978 the Variety Series category was effectively split into two branches, with one-off specials being honored separately from ongoing series. That distinction returned in 2009 with the addition of the Outstanding Writing for a Variety Special category. During the intervening years, writers of one-off variety specials had to compete against series' writers and awards to a variety special were infrequent (they include 1991 and 2000). This lack of distinction also led to some peculiar outcomes, as in 1987 when writers of a special edition of Late Night with David Letterman beat out the series' writers of The Tracey Ullman Show and Saturday Night Live despite the fact that Letterman as a series was not nominated.

Of all the writing Emmy categories, Writing for a Variety Series has recently become the one most dominated by cable networks. Since 1996 it has been won by a major terrestrial broadcaster (aka broadcast network) only twice, with the overwhelming majority of winners coming from HBO and Comedy Central. Since 2003 just 3 series have won the award every year but one (2007): Comedy Central's The Daily Show, its spin-off The Colbert Report, and HBO's Last Week Tonight with John Oliver (Oliver, himself, is a Daily Show alumnus).

The following list of winners is organized both by year and the name being used by the category in that year:

== Winners and nominations ==
=== 1950s ===
Year	Program	Episode	Nominee(s)	Network
Best Written Comedy Material
1955	The George Gobel Show		James B. Allardice, Jack Douglas, Hal Kanter and Harry Winkler	NBC
1955	I Love Lucy		Jess Oppenheimer, Madelyn Pugh and Bob Carroll Jr.	CBS
1955	The Jack Benny Program		George Balzer, Milt Josefsberg, Sam Perrin and John Tackaberry	CBS
1955	The Jackie Gleason Show		Jackie Gleason and staff writers	CBS
1955	Make Room for Daddy		Danny Thomas and staff writers	ABC
1955	Mister Peepers		Jim Fritzell and Everett Greenbaum	NBC
Best Comedy Writing
1956	The Phil Silvers Show		Arnold M. Auerbach, Barry Blitzer, Vincent Bogert, Nat Hiken, Coleman Jacoby, Harvey Orkin, Arnold Rosen, Terry Ryan and Tony Webster	CBS
1956	Caesar's Hour		Mel Brooks, Selma Diamond, Larry Gelbart, Sheldon Keller and Mel Tolkin	NBC
1956	The George Gobel Show		Everett Greenbaum, Hal Kanter, Howard Leeds and Harry Winkler	NBC
1956	I Love Lucy		Jess Oppenheimer, Madelyn Pugh, Bob Carroll Jr., Bob Schiller and Bob Weiskopf	CBS
1956	The Jack Benny Program		George Balzer, Hal Goldman, Al Gordon and Sam Perrin	CBS
Best Comedy Writing - Variety or Situation Comedy
1957	The Phil Silvers Show		Billy Friedberg, Nat Hiken, Coleman Jacoby, Arnold Rosen, Leonard B. Stern and Tony Webster	CBS
1957	Caesar's Hour		Gary Belkin, Mel Brooks, Larry Gelbart, Sheldon Keller, Neil Simon and Michael Stewart and Mel Tolkin	NBC
1957	The Ernie Kovacs Show		Louis M. Heyward, Ernie Kovacs, Rex Lardner and Mike Marmer	NBC
1957	The Jack Benny Program		George Balzer, Hal Goldman, Al Gordon and Sam Perrin	CBS
1957	The Perry Como Show		Goodman Ace, Jay Burton, George Foster and Mort Green	NBC
Best Comedy Writing
1958	The Phil Silvers Show		Billy Friedberg, Nat Hiken, Coleman Jacoby, Arnold Rosen, A.J. Russell, Terry Ryan, Phil Sharp, Tony Webster and Sydney Zelinka	CBS
1958	Caesar's Hour		Gary Belkin, Mel Brooks, Larry Gelbart, Sheldon Keller, Neil Simon and Michael Stewart and Mel Tolkin	NBC
1958	The Ernie Kovacs Show	"No Dialogue Show"	Ernie Kovacs	NBC
1958	Father Knows Best		Roswell Rogers and Paul West	NBC
1958	The Jack Benny Program		George Balzer, Hal Goldman, Al Gordon and Sam Perrin	CBS
Best Writing of a Single Musical or Variety Program
1959	An Evening with Fred Astaire		Herbert Baker and Bud Yorkin	NBC
1959	Art Carney Meets "Peter and the Wolf"		A.J. Russell	ABC
1959	The Perry Como Show	"Pier Angeli, Andy Griffith and Helen O'Connell"	Goodman Ace, Jay Burton, George Foster and Mort Green	NBC
1959	Sid Caesar's Chevy Show		Woody Allen and Larry Gelbart	NBC
1959	The Steve Allen Show	"Peter Ustinov, Louis Armstrong and Van Cliburn"	Stan Burns, Bill Dana, Hal Goodman, Don Hinkley, Larry Klein, Herb Sargent and Leonard Stern	NBC

=== 1960s ===
Year	Program	Episode	Nominee(s)	Network
Outstanding Writing Achievement in Comedy
1960	The Jack Benny Program		George Balzer, Hal Goldman, Al Gordon and Sam Perrin	CBS
1960	The Ballad of Louie the Louse		Nat Hiken	CBS
1960	Father Knows Best		Dorothy Cooper and Roswell Rogers	CBS
1961	The Red Skelton Show		Dave O'Brien, Martin Ragaway, Al Schwartz, Sherwood Schwartz and Red Skelton	CBS
1961	The Danny Thomas Show		Jack Elinson and Charles Stewart	CBS
1961	Hennesey		Richard Baer	CBS
1962	The Dick Van Dyke Show		Carl Reiner	CBS
1962	The Bob Newhart Show		Ernest Chambers, Dean Hargrove, Don Hinkley, Robert Kaufman, Roland Kibbee, Norm Liebman, Bob Newhart, Milt Rosen, Charles Sherman, Larry Siegel and Howard Snyder	NBC
1962	Car 54, Where Are You?		Nat Hiken, Terry Ryan and Tony Webster	NBC
1962	Chun King Chow Mein Hour		Stan Freberg	ABC
1962	The Red Skelton Show		Dave O'Brien, Arthur Phillips, Martin Ragaway, Al Schwartz, Sherwood Schwartz, Ed Simmons and Red Skelton	CBS
1963	The Dick Van Dyke Show		Carl Reiner	CBS
1963	The Beverly Hillbillies		Paul Henning	CBS
1963	Car 54, Where Are You?		Nat Hiken	NBC
1963	The Jack Benny Program		George Balzer, Hal Goldman, Al Gordon and Sam Perrin	CBS
1963	The Red Skelton Show		Mort Greene, Bruce Howard, Rick Mittleman, Dave O'Brien, Arthur Phillips, Martin A. Ragaway, Larry Rhine, Ed Simmons, Red Skelton and Hugh Wedlock	CBS
Outstanding Writing Achievement in Comedy or Variety
1964	The Dick Van Dyke Show		Carl Reiner, Bill Persky and Sam Denoff	CBS
1964	The Danny Kaye Show		Herbert Baker, Gary Belkin, Ernest Chambers, Larry Gelbart, Saul Ilson, Sheldon Keller, Paul Mazursky, Mel Tolkin and Larry Tucker	CBS
1964	The Farmer's Daughter		Steven Gethers, Jerry Davis, Lee Loeb and John McGreevey	ABC
1964	That Was the Week That Was		Robert Emmett, Gerald Gardner, Thomas Meehan, David Panich, Ed Sherman, Saul Turteltaub and Tony Webster	NBC
Outstanding Individual Achievements in Entertainment – Writers
1965 (Note: The 17th Primetime Emmy Awards did not have genre-specific categories.)	The Defenders	"The 700 Year Old Gang"	David Karp	CBS
1965	The Danny Thomas Hour	The Wonderful World of Burlesque	Coleman Jacoby and Arnie Rosen	NBC
1965	The Dick Van Dyke Show	"Never Bathe on Saturday"	Carl Reiner	CBS
1965	Hallmark Hall of Fame	"The Magnificent Yankee"	Robert Hartung	NBC
1965	That Was the Week That Was		William Boardman, Dee Caruso, Robert Emmett, David Frost, Gerald Gardner, Buck Henry, Joseph Hurley, Thomas Meehan, Herbert Sargent, Larry Siegel, Gloria Steinem, Jim Stevenson, Calvin Trillin and Saul Turteltaub	NBC
Outstanding Writing Achievement in Variety
1966 (18th)
1966 (18th)	An Evening with Carol Channing		Hal Goldman, Al Gordon and Sheldon Keller	CBS
1966 (18th)	The Danny Kaye Show		Norman Barasch, Billie Barnes, Ernest Chambers, Ron Friedman, Paul Mazursky, Pat McCormick, Carroll Moore, Bernard Rothman and Larry Tucker	CBS
1966 (18th)	The Julie Andrews Show		Sam Denoff and Bill Persky	NBC
1967 (19th)
1967 (19th)	The Sid Caesar, Imogene Coca, Carl Reiner, Howard Morris Special		Mel Brooks, Sam Denoff, Bill Persky, Carl Reiner and Mel Tolkin	CBS
1967 (19th)	The Dean Martin Show		Harry Crane, Rich Eustis, Lee Hale, Paul Keyes and Al Rogers	NBC
1967 (19th)	The Jackie Gleason Show		Marvin Marx, Rod Parker and Walter Stone	CBS
Outstanding Writing Achievement in Music or Variety
1968 (20th)
1968 (20th)	Rowan & Martin's Laugh-In		Chris Bearde, Phil Hahn, Jack Hanrahan, Coslough Johnson, Paul Keyes, Marc London, Allan Manings, David Panich, Hugh Wedlock Jr. and Digby Wolfe	NBC
1968 (20th)	The Carol Burnett Show		Bill Angelos, Stan Burns, Don Hinkley, Buz Kohan, Mike Marmer, Gail Parent, Arnie Rosen, Kenny Solms and Saul Turteltaub	CBS
1968 (20th)	Rowan & Martin's Laugh-In	"Pilot"	Larry Hovis, Paul Keyes, Jim Mulligan, David Panich, George Schlatter and Digby Wolfe	NBC
1968 (20th)	The Smothers Brothers Comedy Hour	"Ronnie Schell, Kate Smith and Simon & Garfunkel"	Allan Blye, Bob Einstein, Carl Gottlieb, Cy Howard, Steve Martin, Lorenzo Music, Murray Roman, Cecil Tuck, Paul Wayne and Mason Williams	CBS
Outstanding Writing Achievement in Comedy, Variety or Music
1969 (21st)
1969 (21st)	The Smothers Brothers Comedy Hour	"David Frye and Liberace"	Allan Blye, Bob Einstein, Carl Gottlieb, Cy Howard, Steve Martin, Lorenzo Music, Murray Roman, Cecil Tuck, Paul Wayne and Mason Williams	CBS
1969 (21st)	The Carol Burnett Show	"Nanette Fabray, Mel Tormé and Don Rickles"	Roger Beatty, Stan Hart, Don Hinkley, Arthur Julian, Woody Kling, Jack Mendelsohn, Gail Parent, Arnie Rosen, Larry Siegel and Kenny Solms	CBS
1969 (21st)	Rowan & Martin's Laugh-In	"Don Rickles"	Chris Bearde, Jim Carlson, David M. Cox, Phil Hahn, Jack Hanrahan, Coslough Johnson, Paul Keyes, Marc London, Allan Manings, Jack Mendelsohn, Lorne Michaels, James Mulligan, Hart Pomerantz, David Panich and Hugh Wedlock Jr.	NBC

=== 1970s ===
Year	Program	Episode	Writers	Network
Outstanding Writing Achievement in Comedy, Variety or Music
1970 (22nd)
1970 (22nd)	Annie, the Women in the Life of a Man		Gary Belkin, Peter Bellwood, Thomas Meehan, Herb Sargent and Judith Viorst	CBS
1970 (22nd)	Rowan & Martin's Laugh-In	"Buddy Hackett"	Jim Carlson, John Carsey, Jack Douglas, Gene Farmer, Coslough Johnson, Paul Keyes, Jeremy Lloyd, Marc London, Allan Manings, Jim Mulligan, David Panich, John Rappaport and Stephen Spears	NBC
1970 (22nd)	Rowan & Martin's Laugh-In	"Nancy Sinatra"	Jim Abell, Jim Carlson, John Carsey, Jack Douglas, Chet Dowling, Gene Farmer, Coslough Johnson, Jeremy Lloyd, Marc London, Allan Manings, Jim Mulligan, David Panich, John Rappaport, Stephen Spears and Barry Took	NBC
Outstanding Writing Achievement in Variety or Music
1971 (23rd)
1971 (23rd)	The Flip Wilson Show	"Lena Horne and Tony Randall"	Herbert Baker, Hal Goodman, Larry Klein, Bob Schiller, Norman Steinberg, Bob Weiskopf and Flip Wilson	NBC
1971 (23rd)	The Carol Burnett Show	"Rita Hayworth"	Roger Beatty, Stan Hart, Don Hinkley, Arthur Julian, Woody Kling, Jack Mendelsohn, Gail Parent, Arnie Rosen, Larry Siegel and Kenny Solms	CBS
1971 (23rd)	Kraft Music Hall	"The Kopykats Kopy TV"	Norman Barasch, Bob Ellison, Marty Farrell, Coleman Jacoby, Carroll Moore, Danny Simon and Tony Webster	NBC
1972 (24th)
1972 (24th)	The Carol Burnett Show	"Ray Charles"	Art Baer, Roger Beatty, Stan Burns, Stan Hart, Don Hinkley, Ben Joelson, Woody Kling, Mike Marmer, Arnie Rosen and Larry Siegel	CBS
1972 (24th)	The Flip Wilson Show	"Sammy Davis Jr., Lily Tomlin and Ed McMahon"	Herbert Baker, Hal Goodman, Larry Klein, Bob Schiller, Bob Weiskopf, Flip Wilson, Dick Hills and Sid Green	NBC
1972 (24th)	The Sonny & Cher Comedy Hour	"Carroll O'Connor"	Bob Arnott, Chris Bearde, Allan Blye, George Burditt, Bob Einstein, Phil Hahn, Coslough Johnson, Steve Martin and Paul Wayne	CBS
1973 (25th)
1973 (25th)	The Carol Burnett Show	"Steve Lawrence and Lily Tomlin"	Bill Angelos, Roger Beatty, Stan Hart, Robert Hilliard, Woody Kling, Arnie Kogen, Buz Kohan, Gail Parent, Tom Patchett, Larry Siegel and Jay Tarses	CBS
1973 (25th)	The Flip Wilson Show	"Sammy Davis Jr., Ed Sullivan and Marilyn Michaels"	Herbert Baker, Stan Burns, Peter Gallay, Don Hinkley, Mike Marmer, Paul McCauley, Flip Wilson, Dick Hills and Sid Green	NBC
1973 (25th)	The Julie Andrews Hour	"Eliza Doolittle and Mary Poppins"	John Aylesworth, George Bloom, Jay Burton, Bob Ellison, Lila Garrett, Hal Goodman, Larry Klein and Frank Peppiatt	ABC
Best Writing in Comedy-Variety, Variety or Music (A Single Program of a Series)
1974 (26th)
1974 (26th)	The Carol Burnett Show	"Bernadette Peters"	Roger Beatty, Gary Belkin, Dick Clair, Rudy De Luca, Barry Harman, Arnie Kogen, Barry Levinson, Jenna McMahon, Gene Perret, Bill Richmond and Ed Simmons	CBS
1974 (26th)	The Carol Burnett Show	"The Family Show"	Bill Angelos, Roger Beatty, Stan Hart, Robert Hilliard, Woody Kling, Arnie Kogen, Buz Kohan, Gail Parent, Tom Patchett, Larry Siegel and Jay Tarses	CBS
1974 (26th)	The Sonny & Cher Comedy Hour	"Chuck Connors and Howard Cosell"	Bob Arnott, Chris Bearde, Allan Blye, George Burditt, Bob Einstein, Phil Hahn, Coslough Johnson, Jim Mulligan and Paul Wayne	CBS
Outstanding Writing in a Comedy-Variety or Music Series
1975 (27th)
1975 (27th)	The Carol Burnett Show	"Alan Alda"	Roger Beatty, Gary Belkin, Dick Clair, Rudy De Luca, Arnie Kogen, Barry Levinson, Jenna McMahon, Gene Perret, Bill Richmond and Ed Simmons	CBS
1975 (27th)	Cher	"Raquel Welch, Tatum O'Neal and Wayne Rogers"	Nick Arnold, John Boni, Allan Katz, David Panich, Ronny Pearlman, Iris Rainer, Don Reo, George Schlatter, Ray Taylor and Digby Wolfe	CBS
1976 (28th)
1976 (28th)	Saturday Night Live	"Elliott Gould"	Anne Beatts, Chevy Chase, Tom Davis, Al Franken, Lorne Michaels, Marilyn Suzanne Miller, Herb Sargent, Tom Schiller, Rosie Shuster and Alan Zweibel	NBC
1976 (28th)	The Carol Burnett Show	"Jim Nabors"	Roger Beatty, Gary Belkin, Dick Clair, Rudy De Luca, Ray Jessel, Arnie Kogen, Barry Levinson, Jenna McMahon, Gene Perret, Bill Richmond and Ed Simmons	CBS
1976 (28th)	The Sonny & Cher Comedy Hour	"Premiere"	Bob Arnott, John Aylesworth, Jeanine Burnier, Stuart Gillard, Phil Hahn, Coslough Johnson, Frank Peppiatt, Iris Rainer and Ted Zeigler	CBS
1977 (29th)
1977 (29th)	Saturday Night Live	"Sissy Spacek"	Dan Aykroyd, John Belushi, Tom Davis, Jim Downey, Al Franken, Lorne Michaels, Marilyn Suzanne Miller, Bill Murray, Michael O'Donoghue, Herb Sargent, Tom Schiller, Rosie Shuster and Alan Zweibel	NBC
1977 (29th)	The Carol Burnett Show	"Eydie Gormé"	Roger Beatty, Dick Clair, Tim Conway, Elias Davis, Rick Hawkins, Jenna McMahon, Gene Perret, David Pollock, Bill Richmond, Liz Sage, Ed Simmons, Adele Styler and Burt Styler	CBS
1977 (29th)	The Muppet Show	"Paul Williams"	Jack Burns, Jim Henson, Jerry Juhl and Marc London	Syndicated
1977 (29th)	Saturday Night Live	"Elliott Gould"	Anne Beatts, Chevy Chase, Tom Davis, Al Franken, Lorne Michaels, Marilyn Suzanne Miller, Michael O'Donoghue, Herb Sargent, Tom Schiller, Rosie Shuster and Alan Zweibel	NBC
1977 (29th)	Van Dyke & Company	"John Denver"	Allan Blye, George Burditt, Bob Einstein, Garry Ferrier, Ken Finkleman, Mitch Markowitz, Tom McLoughlin, Don Novello, Pat Proft, Leonard Ripps, Mickey Rose, Aubrey Tadman, Dick Van Dyke and Paul Wayne	NBC
1978 (30th)
1978 (30th)	The Carol Burnett Show	"Steve Martin and Betty White"	Roger Beatty, Dick Clair, Tim Conway, Rick Hawkins, Robert Illes, Jenna McMahon, Gene Perret, Bill Richmond, Liz Sage, Larry Siegel, Franelle Silver, Ed Simmons and James R. Stein	CBS
1978 (30th)	America 2Night	"Carol Burnett"	John Boni, Tom Dunsmuir, Robert Illes, Tom Moore, Harry Shearer, James Stein, Jeremy Stevens, Norman Stiles, Alan Thicke and Dan Wilcox	Syndicated
1978 (30th)	The Carol Burnett Show	"Ken Berry"	Roger Beatty, Dick Clair, Tim Conway, Elias Davis, Rick Hawkins, Jenna McMahon, Gene Perret, David Pollock, Bill Richmond, Ed Simmons, Adele Styler and Burt Styler	CBS
1978 (30th)	The Muppet Show	"Dom DeLuise"	Joseph Bailey, Jim Henson, Don Hinkley and Jerry Juhl	Syndicated
1978 (30th)	Saturday Night Live	"Steve Martin"	Dan Aykroyd, Anne Beatts, Tom Davis, Jim Downey, Brian Doyle-Murray, Al Franken, Lorne Michaels, Marilyn Suzanne Miller, Don Novello, Michael O'Donoghue, Herb Sargent, Tom Schiller, Rosie Shuster and Alan Zweibel	NBC
Outstanding Writing in a Comedy or Comedy-Variety or Music Series
1979 (31st) (Note: In 1979, Saturday Night Live was the only variety program nominated for the comedy writing award.)
1979 (31st)	M*A*S*H	"Inga"	Alan Alda	CBS
1979 (31st)	All in the Family	"California, Here We Are, Part 2"	Milt Josefsberg, Bob Schiller, Phil Sharp and Bob Weiskopf	CBS
1979 (31st)	M*A*S*H	"Point of View"	David Isaacs and Ken Levine	CBS
1979 (31st)	Saturday Night Live	"Richard Benjamin"	Dan Aykroyd, Anne Beatts, Tom Davis, Jim Downey, Brian Doyle-Murray, Al Franken, Brian McConnachie, Lorne Michaels, Don Novello, Herb Sargent, Tom Schiller, Rosie Shuster, Walter Williams and Alan Zweibel	NBC
1979 (31st)	Taxi	"Blind Date"	Michael Leeson	ABC

=== 1980s ===
Year	Program	Episode	Writers	Network
Outstanding Writing in a Variety or Music Program
1980 (32nd)
1980 (32nd)	Shirley MacLaine... Every Little Moment		Buz Kohan	CBS
1980 (32nd)	Carol Burnett & Company	"Sally Field"	Bob Arnott, Roger Beatty, Dick Clair, Tim Conway, Ann Elder, Arnie Kogen, Buz Kohan, Jenna McMahon and Kenny Solms	ABC
1980 (32nd)	Goldie and Liza Together		Fred Ebb	CBS
1980 (32nd)	The Muppet Show	"Alan Arkin"	Jim Henson, Don Hinkley, Jerry Juhl and David Odell	Syndicated
1980 (32nd)	Saturday Night Live	"Teri Garr"	Peter Aykroyd, Anne Beatts, Tom Davis, Jim Downey, Brian Doyle-Murray, Al Franken, Lorne Michaels, Matt Neuman, Don Novello, Sarah Paley, Herb Sargent, Tom Schiller, Harry Shearer, Rosie Shuster, Alan Zweibel, Tom Gammill and Max Pross	NBC
Outstanding Writing in a Variety, Music or Comedy Program
1981 (33rd)
1981 (33rd)	The Muppet Show	"Carol Burnett"	Jerry Juhl, Chris Langham and David Odell	Syndicated
1981 (33rd)	The American Film Institute Salute to Fred Astaire		Joseph McBride and George Stevens Jr.	CBS
1981 (33rd)	Lily: Sold Out		Nancy Audley, Ann Elder, Irene Mecchi, Elaine Pope, Ziggy Steinberg, Rocco Urbisci, Jane Wagner and Rod Warren	CBS
1981 (33rd)	Sylvia Fine Kaye's Musical Comedy Tonight II		Sylvia Fine Kaye	PBS
1981 (33rd)	The Tonight Show Starring Johnny Carson	"18th Anniversary Show"	Michael Barrie, Greg Fields, Hal Goodman, Larry Klein, Pat McCormick, Jim Mulholland, Kevin Mulholland, Gary Murphy, Raymond Siller and Robert Smith	NBC
Outstanding Writing in a Variety or Music Program
1982 (34th)
1982 (34th)	SCTV Network	"Moral Majority"	Jeffrey Barron, Dick Blasucci, John Candy, Chris Cluess, Bob Dolman, Joe Flaherty, Paul Flaherty, Stuart Kreisman, Eugene Levy, Andrea Martin, John McAndrew, Brian McConnachie, Rick Moranis, Catherine O'Hara, Mert Rich, Michael Short, Doug Steckler and Dave Thomas	NBC
1982 (34th)	I Love Liberty		Richard Alfieri, Rita Mae Brown, Norman Lear, Rick Mitz and Arthur Allan Seidelman	ABC
1982 (34th)	SCTV Network	"The Great White North Palace"	Dick Blasucci, John Candy, Tom Couch, Bob Dolman, Joe Flaherty, Paul Flaherty, Eddie Gorodetsky, Eugene Levy, Andrea Martin, John McAndrew, Rick Moranis, Don Novello, Catherine O'Hara, Michael Short, Doug Steckler and Dave Thomas	NBC
1982 (34th)	SCTV Network	"I'm Taking My Own Head..."	Jeffrey Barron, Dick Blasucci, John Candy, Bob Dolman, Joe Flaherty, Paul Flaherty, Eugene Levy, Andrea Martin, John McAndrew, Rick Moranis, Catherine O'Hara, Mert Rich, Doug Steckler and Dave Thomas	NBC
1982 (34th)	SCTV Network	"SCTV Staff Christmas Party"	Jeffrey Barron, Dick Blasucci, John Candy, Bob Dolman, Joe Flaherty, Paul Flaherty, Eugene Levy, Andrea Martin, John McAndrew, Rick Moranis, Catherine O'Hara, Doug Steckler and Dave Thomas	NBC
1983 (35th)
1983 (35th)	SCTV Network	"Sweeps Week"	Dick Blasucci, John Candy, Bob Dolman, Joe Flaherty, Paul Flaherty, Eugene Levy, Andrea Martin, John McAndrew, Martin Short, Michael Short, Doug Steckler and Mary Charlotte Wilcox	NBC
1983 (35th)	SCTV Network	"Christmas 1982"	Dick Blasucci, John Candy, Bob Dolman, Joe Flaherty, Paul Flaherty, Eugene Levy, Andrea Martin, John McAndrew, Catherine O'Hara, Martin Short, Michael Short, Doug Steckler and Mary Charlotte Wilcox	NBC
1983 (35th)	SCTV Network	"Jane Eyrehead"	Jeffrey Barron, Dick Blasucci, John Candy, Bob Dolman, Joe Flaherty, Paul Flaherty, Eugene Levy, Andrea Martin, John McAndrew, Martin Short, Michael Short, Doug Steckler, Dave Thomas and Mary Charlotte Wilcox	NBC
1983 (35th)	SCTV Network	"Midnight Cowboy II"	Jeffrey Barron, Dick Blasucci, John Candy, Bob Dolman, Joe Flaherty, Paul Flaherty, Eugene Levy, Andrea Martin, John McAndrew, Martin Short, Michael Short, Doug Steckler and Mary Charlotte Wilcox	NBC
1983 (35th)	SCTV Network	"Towering Inferno"	Jeffrey Barron, Dick Blasucci, John Candy, Bob Dolman, Joe Flaherty, Paul Flaherty, Eugene Levy, Andrea Martin, John McAndrew, Martin Short, Michael Short, Doug Steckler, Dave Thomas and Mary Charlotte Wilcox	NBC
1984 (36th)
1984 (36th)	Late Night with David Letterman	"312"	Chris Elliott, Sanford Frank, Ted Greenberg, David Letterman, Merrill Markoe, Jeff Martin, Gerard Mulligan, Steve O'Donnell, Joe Toplyn, Matt Wickline and David Yazbek	NBC
1984 (36th)	38th Tony Awards		Hildy Parks	CBS
1984 (36th)	The 6th Annual Kennedy Center Honors		L.T. Ilehart, Marc London, Sara Lukinson and George Stevens Jr.	CBS
1984 (36th)	The American Film Institute Salute to Lillian Gish		Joseph McBride and George Stevens Jr.	CBS
1984 (36th)	Late Night with David Letterman	"285"	Andy Breckman, Jim Downey, Sanford Frank, David Letterman, Merrill Markoe, George Meyer, Gerard Mulligan and Steve O'Donnell	NBC
1984 (36th)	Late Night with David Letterman	"291"	Jim Downey, Chris Elliott, Sanford Frank, David Letterman, Merrill Markoe, George Meyer, Gerard Mulligan, Steve O'Donnell, Joe Toplyn, Matt Wickline, Tom Gammill and Max Pross	NBC
1984 (36th)	Saturday Night Live	"Billy Crystal, Ed Koch, Edwin Newman, Don Novello and Betty Thomas"	Jim Belushi, Andy Breckman, Robin Duke, Adam Green, Mary Gross, Nate Herman, Tim Kazurinsky, Kevin Kelton, Andrew Kurtzman, Michael McCarthy, Eddie Murphy, Pamela Norris, Margaret Oberman, Joe Piscopo, Herb Sargent, Andrew Smith, Bob Tischler and Eliot Wald	NBC
1985 (37th)
1985 (37th)	Late Night with David Letterman	"Christmas with the Lettermans"	Randy Cohen, Kevin Curran, Chris Elliott, Sanford Frank, Eddie Gorodetsky, Fred Graver, Larry Jacobson, David Letterman, Merrill Markoe, Jeff Martin, Gerard Mulligan, Joe Toplyn and Matt Wickline	NBC
1985 (37th)	The American Film Institute Salute to Gene Kelly		Jeffrey Lane and George Stevens Jr.	CBS
1985 (37th)	Late Night with David Letterman	"Late Night in Los Angeles"	Randy Cohen, Kevin Curran, Chris Elliott, Sanford Frank, Fred Graver, Larry Jacobson, David Letterman, Merrill Markoe, Jeff Martin, Gerard Mulligan, Steve O'Donnell, Joe Toplyn and Matt Wickline	NBC
1985 (37th)	Late Night with David Letterman	"The Late Night Morning Show"	Randy Cohen, Kevin Curran, Chris Elliott, Sanford Frank, Fred Graver, Larry Jacobson, David Letterman, Jeff Martin, Gerard Mulligan, Steve O'Donnell, Joe Toplyn and Matt Wickline	NBC
1985 (37th)	Motown Returns to the Apollo		Peter Elbling, Buz Kohan and Samm-Art Williams	NBC
1986 (38th)
1986 (38th)	Late Night with David Letterman	"4th Anniversary Special"	Randy Cohen, Kevin Curran, Chris Elliott, Sanford Frank, Fred Graver, Larry Jacobson, David Letterman, Merrill Markoe, Jeff Martin, Gerard Mulligan, Steve O'Donnell, Joe Toplyn and Matt Wickline	NBC
1986 (38th)	40th Tony Awards		Hildy Parks	CBS
1986 (38th)	The American Film Institute Salute to Billy Wilder		Jeffrey Lane and George Stevens Jr.	NBC
1986 (38th)	Great Performances	Sylvia Fine Kaye's Musical Comedy Tonight III	Sylvia Fine Kaye	PBS
1986 (38th)	The Tonight Show Starring Johnny Carson	"David Letterman, Maureen McGovern and Adela Rivera"	Michael Barrie, Gary Belkin, Hal Goodman, Bob Keane, Larry Klein, Jim Mulholland, Kevin Mulholland, Raymond Siller, Andrew Nicholls and Darrell Vickers	NBC
1987 (39th)
1987 (39th)	Late Night with David Letterman	"5th Anniversary Special"	Randy Cohen, Kevin Curran, Chris Elliott, Sanford Frank, Fred Graver, Larry Jacobson, David Letterman, Jeff Martin, Gerard Mulligan, Steve O'Donnell, Adam Resnick, Joe Toplyn and Matt Wickline	NBC
1987 (39th)	41st Tony Awards		Jeffrey Lane	CBS
1987 (39th)	Saturday Night Live		Andy Breckman, A. Whitney Brown, E. Jean Carroll, Tom Davis, Jim Downey, Al Franken, Eddie Gorodetsky, Phil Hartman, George Meyer, Lorne Michaels, Kevin Nealon, Margaret Oberman, Herb Sargent, Marc Shaiman, Rosie Shuster, Robert Smigel, Bonnie and Terry Turner, Jon Vitti and Christine Zander	NBC
1987 (39th)	The Tonight Show Starring Johnny Carson		Michael Barrie, Gary Belkin, Hal Goodman, Bob Keane, Larry Klein, Jim Mulholland, Kevin Mulholland, Raymond Siller, Andrew Nicholls and Darrell Vickers	NBC
1987 (39th)	The Tracey Ullman Show	"The Lottery / Girl on a Ledge / Ambulance Pick Up"	Jerry Belson, Dick Blasucci, James L. Brooks, Ken Estin, Paul Flaherty, Marc Flanagan, Kim Fuller, Matt Groening, Susan Herring, Heide Perlman and Sam Simon	Fox
1988 (40th)
1988 (40th)	Jackie Mason on Broadway		Jackie Mason	HBO
1988 (40th)	Late Night with David Letterman	"6th Anniversary Special"	Randy Cohen, Kevin Curran, Chris Elliott, Fred Graver, Boyd Hale, Larry Jacobson, David Letterman, Jeff Martin, Gerard Mulligan, Steve O'Donnell, Adam Resnick, Joe Toplyn and Matt Wickline	NBC
1988 (40th)	The Smothers Brothers Comedy Hour	"20th Reunion"	Bob Arnott and Mason Williams	CBS
1988 (40th)	The Tracey Ullman Show	"Ginny Redux / Fear / Real Lace"	Jerry Belson, Dick Blasucci, James L. Brooks, Ken Estin, Marc Flanagan, Matt Groening, Jay Kogen, Heide Perlman, Sam Simon, Tracey Ullman and Wallace Wolodarsky	Fox
1989 (41st)
1989 (41st)	Saturday Night Live		John Bowman, A. Whitney Brown, Greg Daniels, Tom Davis, Jim Downey, Al Franken, Shannon Gaughan, Jack Handey, Phil Hartman, George Meyer, Lorne Michaels, Mike Myers, Conan O'Brien, Bob Odenkirk, Herb Sargent, Tom Schiller, Robert Smigel, Bonnie and Terry Turner and Christine Zander	NBC
1989 (41st)	Late Night with David Letterman	"7th Anniversary Special"	Rob Burnett, Randy Cohen, Kevin Curran, Chris Elliott, Fred Graver, Boyd Hale, Larry Jacobson, David Letterman, Jeff Martin, Gerard Mulligan, Steve O'Donnell, Adam Resnick, Joe Toplyn and Matt Wickline	NBC
1989 (41st)	Not Necessarily the News		Larry Arnstein, Steve Barker, David Hurwitz, Billy Kimball, Matt Neuman and Lane Sarasohn	HBO
1989 (41st)	The Tonight Show Starring Johnny Carson		Michael Barrie, Tony Desena, Hal Goodman, Bob Keane, Larry Klein, Jim Mulholland, Kevin Mulholland, Raymond Siller, Bob Smith, Patric Verrone, Andrew Nicholls and Darrell Vickers	NBC
1989 (41st)	The Tracey Ullman Show	"5W76"	Jerry Belson, Dick Blasucci, James L. Brooks, Ken Estin, Marc Flanagan, Matt Groening, Jay Kogen, Heide Perlman, Michael Sardo, Sam Simon, Tracey Ullman and Wallace Wolodarsky	Fox

=== 1990s ===
Year	Program	Writers	Network
Outstanding Writing in a Variety or Music Program
1990 (42nd)
1990 (42nd)	Billy Crystal: Midnight Train to Moscow	Billy Crystal	HBO
1990 (42nd)	The Tracey Ullman Show	Jay Kogen, James L. Brooks, Jerry Belson, Marc Flanagan, Dinah Kirgo, Marilyn Suzanne Miller, Heide Perlman, Ian Praiser, Sam Simon, Tracey Ullman and Wallace Wolodarsky	Fox
1990 (42nd)	In Living Color	Franklyn Ajaye, Jeannette Collins, Barry "Berry" Douglas, Rob Edwards, Sandy Frank, Mimi Friedman, Jeff Joseph, Howard Kuperbeg, Buddy Sheffield, Joe Toplyn, Damon Wayans, Keenen Ivory Wayans, Matt Wickline	Fox
1990 (42nd)	Late Night with David Letterman	Rob Burnett, Spike Feresten, Larry Jacobson, David Letterman, Gerard Mulligan, Steve O'Donnell, Maria Pope, Paul Simms and Steve Young	NBC
1990 (42nd)	Saturday Night Live	A. Whitney Brown, Greg Daniels, Tom Davis, Jim Downey, Al Franken, Jack Handey, Tom Hymes, Lorne Michaels, Mike Myers, Conan O'Brien, Bob Odenkirk, Herb Sargent, Tom Schiller, Rob Schneider, Robert Smigel, David Spade, Bonnie and Terry Turner and Christine Zander	NBC
1991 (43rd)
1991 (43rd)	63rd Academy Awards	Billy Crystal, Hal Kanter, Buz Kohan, David Steinberg, Bruce Vilanch and Robert Wuhl	ABC
1991 (43rd)	In Living Color	Fax Bahr, Kim Bass, John Bowman, Greg Fields, Les Firestein, Becky Hartman Edwards, J. J. Paulsen, Buddy Sheffield, Adam Small, Steve Tompkins, Pam Veasey, Keenen Ivory Wayans and Damon Wayans	Fox
1991 (43rd)	Late Night with David Letterman	Rob Burnett, Spike Feresten, Larry Jacobson, David Letterman, Gerard Mulligan, Steve O'Donnell, Maria Pope, Paul Simms and Steve Young	NBC
1991 (43rd)	The Muppets Celebrate Jim Henson	Jerry Juhl, Sara Lukinson and Bill Prady	CBS
1991 (43rd)	Saturday Night Live	A. Whitney Brown, Tom Davis, Jim Downey, Al Franken, Jack Handey, Lorne Michaels, Conan O'Brien, Bob Odenkirk, Andrew Robin, Adam Sandler, Herb Sargent, Rob Schneider, Robert Smigel, David Spade, Bonnie and Terry Turner and Christine Zander	NBC
Outstanding Individual Achievement in Writing in a Variety or Music Program
1992 (44th)
1992 (44th)	64th Academy Awards	Billy Crystal, Hal Kanter, Buz Kohan, Marc Shaiman, David Steinberg, Bruce Vilanch and Robert Wuhl	ABC
1992 (44th)	In Living Color	Fax Bahr, John Bowman, Harry Dunn, Greg Fields, Les Firestein, Fred Graver, Becky Hartman Edwards, Michelle Jones, Buddy Sheffield, Adam Small, Michael Anthony Snowden, Steve Tompkins, Pam Veasey, Keenen Ivory Wayans, Damon Wayans, Larry Wilmore and Marc Wilmore	Fox
1992 (44th)	Late Night with David Letterman	Rob Burnett, Jill Davis, Spike Feresten, Joe Furey, Larry Jacobson, Ken Keeler, David Letterman, Gerard Mulligan, Steve O'Donnell, Maria Pope, Adam Resnick, Bill Scheft, Paul Simms and Steve Young	NBC
1992 (44th)	Saturday Night Live	Tom Davis, Jim Downey, Al Franken, Jack Handey, Warren Hutcherson, Steve Koren, Dan McGrath, Lorne Michaels, Adam Sandler, Herb Sargent, Rob Schneider, Robert Smigel, Bonnie and Terry Turner and Christine Zander	NBC
1992 (44th)	The Tonight Show Starring Johnny Carson	Michael Barrie, Tony Desena, Tom Finnigan, Bob Keane, Jim Mulholland, Bob Smith, Andrew Nicholls and Darrell Vickers	NBC
1993 (45th)
1993 (45th)	The Ben Stiller Show	Judd Apatow, Robert Cohen, David Cross, Brent Forrester, Jeff Kahn, Bruce Kirschbaum, Bob Odenkirk, Sultan Pepper, Dino Stamatopoulos and Ben Stiller	Fox
1993 (45th)	The Kids in the Hall	Paul Bellini, Dave Foley, Brian Hartt, Norm Hiscock, Bruce McCulloch, Kevin McDonald, Mark McKinney and Scott Thompson	HBO
1993 (45th)	Late Night with David Letterman	Jon Beckerman, Rob Burnett, Donick Cary, Jill Davis, Spike Feresten, Larry Jacobson, David Letterman, Gerard Mulligan, Steve O'Donnell, Brian Reich, Bill Scheft and Steve Young	NBC
1993 (45th)	Rick Reynolds: Only the Truth Is Funny	Rick Reynolds	Showtime
1993 (45th)	Saturday Night Live	Tom Davis, Jim Downey, Al Franken, Jack Handey, Bruce Handy, Warren Hutcherson, Steve Koren, David Mandel, Ian Maxtone-Graham, Tim Meadows, Lorne Michaels, Vanessa Middleton, Adam Sandler, Herb Sargent, Robert Smigel, David Spade, Bonnie and Terry Turner and Christine Zander	NBC
1994 (46th)
1994 (46th)	Dennis Miller Live	Jeff Cesario, Mike Dugan, Eddie Feldmann, Gregory Greenberg, Dennis Miller and Kevin Rooney	HBO
1994 (46th)	The Kids in the Hall	Paul Bellini, Garry Campbell, Diane Flacks, Dave Foley, Brian Hartt, Norm Hiscock, Andy Jones, Bruce McCulloch, Kevin McDonald, Mark McKinney and Scott Thompson	CBS
1994 (46th)	Late Show with David Letterman	Nick Arnold, Jon Beckerman, Rob Burnett, Donick Cary, Jill Davis, Spike Feresten, Dave Hanson, Larry Jacobson, David Letterman, Gerard Mulligan, Steve O'Donnell, Bill Scheft, Jeff Stilson and Steve Young	CBS
1994 (46th)	Mystery Science Theater 3000	Trace Beaulieu, Paul Chaplin, Frank Conniff, Bridget Jones, Jim Mallon, Kevin Murphy, Michael J. Nelson, Mary Jo Pehl, David Sussman and Colleen Williams	Comedy Central
1994 (46th)	Tracey Ullman Takes On New York	Dick Clement, Marc Flanagan, Ian La Frenais, Stephen Nathan and Tony Sheehan	HBO
1995 (48th)
1995 (48th)	Dennis Miller Live	Jeff Cesario, Ed Driscoll, David Feldman, Eddie Feldmann, Gregory Greenberg, Dennis Miller and Kevin Rooney	HBO
1995 (48th)	The Kids in the Hall	Paul Bellini, Garry Campbell, Diane Flacks, Dave Foley, Brian Hartt, Norm Hiscock, Andy Jones, Bruce McCulloch, Kevin McDonald, Mark McKinney and Scott Thompson	CBS
1995 (48th)	Late Show with David Letterman Video Special	Michael Barrie, Jon Beckerman, Rob Burnett, Donick Cary, Jill Davis, Spike Feresten, Dave Hanson, Larry Jacobson, Chris Kelly, David Letterman, Jim Mulholland, Gerard Mulligan, Steve O'Donnell, Bill Scheft, Jeff Stilson and Steve Young	CBS
1995 (48th)	Mystery Science Theater 3000	Trace Beaulieu, Paul Chaplin, Frank Conniff, Mike Dodge, Bridget Jones, Jim Mallon, Kevin Murphy, Michael J. Nelson, Mary Jo Pehl and Colleen Williams	Comedy Central
1995 (48th)	Politically Incorrect with Bill Maher	Scott Carter, Christopher Case Erbland, Hayes Jackson, Tim Long and Eric Weinberg	Comedy Central
Outstanding Writing for a Variety or Music Program
1996 (48th)
1996 (48th)	Dennis Miller Live	David Feldman, Eddie Feldmann, Mike Gandolfi, Tom Hertz, Leah Krinsky, Dennis Miller and Rick Overton	HBO
1996 (48th)	Late Night with Conan O'Brien	Tom Agna, Chris Albers, Tommy Blacha, Greg Cohen, Janine Ditullio, Ned Goldreyer, Michael Gordon, Jonathan Groff, Brian Kiley, Brian McCann, Conan O'Brien, Brian Reich, Andy Richter, Dino Stamatopoulos and Mike Sweeney	NBC
1996 (48th)	Late Show with David Letterman	Michael Barrie, Jon Beckerman, Rob Burnett, Donick Cary, Jill Davis, Davey DiGiorgio, Larry Jacobson, David Letterman, Tim Long, Jim Mulholland, Gerard Mulligan, Rodney Rothman, Bill Scheft, Stephen Sherrill, Joe Toplyn, Rob Young and Steve Young	CBS
1996 (48th)	Politically Incorrect with Bill Maher	Chris Albers, Scott Carter, Christopher Case Erbland, Jon Hotchkiss, Hayes Jackson, Brian Jacobsmeyer, Chris Kelly, Bill Maher, Billy Martin and Eric Weinberg	Comedy Central
1996 (48th)	Tracey Takes On...	Jerry Belson, Dick Clement, Kim Fuller, Jenji Kohan, Ian La Frenais, Molly Newman, Gail Parent, Tony Sheehan, Tracey Ullman and Allen J. Zipper	HBO
1997 (49th)
1997 (49th)	Chris Rock: Bring the Pain	Chris Rock	HBO
1997 (49th)	Dennis Miller Live	David Feldman, Eddie Feldmann, Jim Hanna, Tom Hertz, Leah Krinsky, Dennis Miller and Rick Overton	HBO
1997 (49th)	Late Night with Conan O'Brien	Tom Agna, Chris Albers, Ellie Barancik, Tommy Blacha, Greg Cohen, Janine Ditullio, Michael Gordon, Jonathan Groff, Brian Kiley, Brian McCann, Conan O'Brien, Brian Reich, Andy Richter, Robert Smigel and Mike Sweeney	NBC
1997 (49th)	Late Show with David Letterman	Michael Barrie, Jon Beckerman, Rob Burnett, Alex Gregory, Matt Harrigan, Peter Huyck, Eric Kaplan, David Letterman, Tim Long, Jim Mulholland, Gerard Mulligan, Rodney Rothman, Bill Scheft, Joe Toplyn and Steve Young	CBS
1997 (49th)	Politically Incorrect with Bill Maher	Franklyn Ajaye, Scott Carter, Christopher Case Erbland, Al Franken, Jon Hotchkiss, Arianna Huffington, Hayes Jackson, Brian Jacobsmeyer, Bill Kelley, Chris Kelly, Bill Maher, Billy Martin, Ned Rice, Chris Rock, Geoff Rodkey, Michael Rotman, Jeff Stilson, Danny Vermont and Eric Weinberg	ABC
1997 (49th)	Tracey Takes On...	Jerry Belson, Dick Clement, Ian La Frenais, Robert Klane, Jenji Kohan, Molly Newman, Gail Parent, Tracey Ullman and Allen J. Zipper	HBO
1998 (50th)
1998 (50th)	Dennis Miller Live	Jose Arroyo, David Feldman, Eddie Feldmann, Jim Hanna, Leah Krinsky, Dennis Miller and David Weiss	HBO
1998 (50th)	The Chris Rock Show	Louis C.K., Lance Crouther, Gregory Greenberg, Jon Hayman, Paul Kozlowski, Ali LeRoi, Steve O'Donnell, Chris Rock, Chuck Sklar, Jeff Stilson and Wanda Sykes	HBO
1998 (50th)	Late Night with Conan O'Brien	Chris Albers, Ellie Barancik, Tommy Blacha, Greg Cohen, Janine Ditullio, Michael Gordon, Jonathan Groff, Brian Kiley, Brian McCann, Conan O'Brien, Brian Reich, Andy Richter, Brian Stack and Mike Sweeney	NBC
1998 (50th)	Late Show with David Letterman	Gabe Abelson, Michael Barrie, Carter Bays, Jon Beckerman, Rob Burnett, Will Forte, Eric Kaplan, David Letterman, Tim Long, Jim Mulholland, Gerard Mulligan, Rodney Rothman, Eric Stangel, Justin Stangel, Craig Thomas, Joe Toplyn and Steve Young	CBS
1998 (50th)	Mr. Show with Bob and David	David Cross, Jay Johnston, Bob Odenkirk, Bill Odenkirk, Brian Posehn, Dino Stamatopoulos, Michael Stoyanov, Paul F. Tompkins and Mike Upchurch	HBO
1999 (51st)
1999 (51st)	The Chris Rock Show	Tom Agna, Vernon Chatman, Louis C.K., Lance Crouther, Gregory Greenberg, Ali LeRoi, Steve O'Donnell, Chris Rock, Frank Sebastiano, Chuck Sklar, Jeff Stilson, Wanda Sykes and Mike Upchurch	HBO
1999 (51st)	Dennis Miller Live	Jose Arroyo, David Feldman, Eddie Feldmann, Jim Hanna, Leah Krinsky, Dennis Miller and David Weiss	HBO
1999 (51st)	Late Night with Conan O'Brien	Chris Albers, Ellie Barancik, Tommy Blacha, Janine Ditullio, Jon Glaser, Michael Gordon, Jonathan Groff, Brian Kiley, Brian McCann, Conan O'Brien, Andy Richter, Brian Stack and Mike Sweeney	NBC
1999 (51st)	Late Show with David Letterman	Gabe Abelson, Michael Barrie, Carter Bays, Jon Beckerman, Jeff Boggs, Rob Burnett, Chris Harris, David Javerbaum, David Letterman, Jim Mulholland, Gerard Mulligan, Rodney Rothman, Tom Ruprecht, Eric Stangel, Justin Stangel, Craig Thomas, Joe Toplyn and Steve Young	CBS
1999 (51st)	Mr. Show with Bob and David	Scott Aukerman, Jerry Collins, David Cross, Jay Johnston, Bob Odenkirk, Bill Odenkirk, B. J. Porter, Brian Posehn and Dino Stamatopoulos	HBO

=== 2000s ===
Year	Program	Writers	Network
Outstanding Writing for a Variety, Music or Comedy Program
2000 (52nd)
2000 (52nd)	Eddie Izzard: Dress to Kill	Eddie Izzard	HBO
2000 (52nd)	Chris Rock: Bigger & Blacker	Chris Rock	HBO
2000 (52nd)	The Chris Rock Show	Tom Agna, Vernon Chatman, Louis C.K., Lance Crouther, Nick Di Paolo, Ali LeRoi, Steve O'Donnell, Chris Rock, Chuck Sklar, Jeff Stilson, Halsted Sullivan, Wanda Sykes and Mike Upchurch	HBO
2000 (52nd)	Late Night with Conan O'Brien	Chris Albers, Ellie Barancik, Andy Blitz, Louis C.K., Janine Ditullio, Jon Glaser, Michael Gordon, Jonathan Groff, Roy Jenkins, Brian Kiley, Brian McCann, Conan O'Brien, Andy Richter, Robert Smigel, Brian Stack and Mike Sweeney	NBC
2000 (52nd)	Late Show with David Letterman	Gabe Abelson, Michael Barrie, Carter Bays, Rob Burnett, Chris Harris, David Letterman, Jim Mulholland, Gerard Mulligan, Rodney Rothman, Tom Ruprecht, Bill Scheft, Beth Sherman, Eric Stangel, Justin Stangel, Craig Thomas, Joe Toplyn and Steve Young	CBS
2001 (53rd)
2001 (53rd)	The Daily Show with Jon Stewart	Eric Drysdale, Jim Earl, Dan Goor, Charlie Grandy, J. R. Havlan, Tom Johnson, Kent Jones, Paul Mecurio, Chris Regan, Allison Silverman and Jon Stewart	Comedy Central
2001 (53rd)	The Chris Rock Show	Tom Agna, Lance Crouther, Nick Di Paolo, Daniel Dratch, Ali LeRoi, John Marshall, Steve O'Donnell, Chris Rock, Frank Sebastiano, Jeff Stilson, Wanda Sykes, Bryan Tucker and Mike Upchurch	HBO
2001 (53rd)	Late Night with Conan O'Brien	Chris Albers, Ellie Barancik, Andy Blitz, Janine Ditullio, Kevin Dorff, Jon Glaser, Michael Gordon, Jonathan Groff, Roy Jenkins, Brian Kiley, Brian McCann, Guy Nicolucci, Conan O'Brien, Brian Stack, Mike Sweeney and Andrew Weinberg	NBC
2001 (53rd)	Late Show with David Letterman	Eric Stangel, Justin Stangel, Gabe Abelson, Michael Barrie, Carter Bays, Lee Ellenberg, Chris Harris, David Letterman, Jim Mulholland, Gerard Mulligan, Tom Ruprecht, Bill Scheft, Craig Thomas, Joe Toplyn and Steve Young	CBS
2001 (53rd)	Saturday Night Live	James Anderson, Robert Carlock, Jerry Collins, Tony Daro, Jim Downey, Tina Fey, Hugh Fink, Melanie Graham, Tim Herlihy, Steve Higgins, Erik Kenward, Adam McKay, Dennis McNicholas, Lorne Michaels, Jerry Minor, Matt Murray, Paula Pell, Matt Piedmont, Jon Rosenfeld, Michael Schur, T. Sean Shannon, Robert Smigel, Barry Sobel, Harper Steele and Scott Wainio	NBC
2002 (54th)
2002 (54th)	Saturday Night Live	Doug Abeles, James Anderson, Max Brooks, Jim Downey, Tina Fey, Hugh Fink, Charlie Grandy, Jack Handey, Steve Higgins, Erik Kenward, Dennis McNicholas, Lorne Michaels, Matt Murray, Paula Pell, Matt Piedmont, Ken Scarborough, Michael Schur, Frank Sebastiano, T. Sean Shannon, Robert Smigel, Emily Spivey, Harper Steele and Scott Wainio	NBC
2002 (54th)	America: A Tribute to Heroes	Eli Attie, Bill Clark, Chris Connelly, Terry Edmonds, Tom Fontana, Marshall Herskovitz, David Leaf, Ann Lewis, Peggy Noonan, Eugene Pack, Philip Rosenthal, Bob Shrum, David Wild and Edward Zwick	Syndicated
2002 (54th)	The Daily Show with Jon Stewart	Aaron Bergeron, Jonathan Bines, Eric Drysdale, J. R. Havlan, David Javerbaum, Tom Johnson, Ben Karlin, Paul Mecurio, Chris Regan, Jason Reich and Jon Stewart	Comedy Central
2002 (54th)	Late Night with Conan O'Brien	Chris Albers, Andy Blitz, Kevin Dorff, Jon Glaser, Michael Gordon, Brian Kiley, Michael Koman, Brian McCann, Guy Nicolucci, Conan O'Brien, Andrew Secunda, Allison Silverman, Robert Smigel, Brian Stack, Mike Sweeney and Andrew Weinberg	NBC
2002 (54th)	Late Show with David Letterman	Eric Stangel, Justin Stangel, Gabe Abelson, Michael Barrie, Carter Bays, Lee Ellenberg, Jason Gelles, Jonathan Green, Chris Harris, Mike Haukom, David Letterman, Gabe Miller, Jim Mulholland, Gerard Mulligan, Tom Ruprecht, Bill Scheft, Craig Thomas, Joe Toplyn and Steve Young	CBS
2003 (55th)
2003 (55th)	The Daily Show with Jon Stewart	Rich Blomquist, Steve Bodow, Eric Drysdale, J. R. Havlan, Scott Jacobson, David Javerbaum, Tom Johnson, Ben Karlin, Rob Kutner, Chris Regan, Jason Reich, Jason Ross and Jon Stewart	Comedy Central
2003 (55th)	Late Night with Conan O'Brien	Mike Sweeney, Chris Albers, Jose Arroyo, Andy Blitz, Kevin Dorff, Jon Glaser, Michael Gordon, Brian Kiley, Michael Koman, Brian McCann, Guy Nicolucci, Conan O'Brien, Andrew Secunda, Allison Silverman, Frank Smiley, Brian Stack and Andrew Weinberg	NBC
2003 (55th)	Late Show with David Letterman	Eric Stangel, Justin Stangel, Michael Barrie, Lee Ellenberg, Jonathan Green, Steve Hely, Jim Kramer, David Letterman, Gabe Miller, Jim Mulholland, Gerard Mulligan, Matt Roberts, Tom Ruprecht, Bill Scheft and Steve Young	CBS
2003 (55th)	Robin Williams: Live on Broadway	Robin Williams	HBO
2003 (55th)	Saturday Night Live	Doug Abeles, Leo Allen, James Anderson, Max Brooks, Jim Downey, James Eagan, Tina Fey, Al Franken, Kristin Gore, Charlie Grandy, Steve Higgins, Erik Kenward, Dennis McNicholas, Lorne Michaels, Corwin Moore, Matt Murray, Paula Pell, Ken Scarborough, Michael Schur, Frank Sebastiano, T. Sean Shannon, Eric Slovin, Robert Smigel, Emily Spivey, Harper Steele and Scott Wainio	NBC
2004 (56th)
2004 (56th)	The Daily Show with Jon Stewart	Rich Blomquist, Steve Bodow, Tim Carvell, Stephen Colbert, Eric Drysdale, J. R. Havlan, Scott Jacobson, David Javerbaum, Ben Karlin, Chris Regan, Jason Reich, Jason Ross and Jon Stewart	Comedy Central
2004 (56th)	Chappelle's Show	Neal Brennan and Dave Chappelle	Comedy Central
2004 (56th)	Chris Rock: Never Scared	Chris Rock	HBO
2004 (56th)	Late Night with Conan O'Brien	Mike Sweeney, Chris Albers, Jose Arroyo, Andy Blitz, Kevin Dorff, Daniel J. Goor, Michael Gordon, Brian Kiley, Michael Koman, Demetri Martin, Brian McCann, Guy Nicolucci, Conan O'Brien, Allison Silverman, Brian Stack and Andrew Weinberg	NBC
2004 (56th)	Late Show with David Letterman	Eric Stangel, Justin Stangel, Michael Barrie, Lee Ellenberg, Jonathan Green, Joe Grossman, David Letterman, Gabe Miller, Jim Mulholland, Gerard Mulligan, Matt Roberts, Tom Ruprecht, Bill Scheft, Jeremy Weiner and Steve Young	CBS
2005 (57th)
2005 (57th)	The Daily Show with Jon Stewart	Rich Blomquist, Steve Bodow, Tim Carvell, Stephen Colbert, Eric Drysdale, J. R. Havlan, Scott Jacobson, David Javerbaum, Ben Karlin, Rob Kutner, Chris Regan, Jason Reich, Jason Ross and Jon Stewart	Comedy Central
2005 (57th)	Da Ali G Show	James Bobin, Sacha Baron Cohen, Rich Dahm, Jamie Glassman, Evan Goldberg, Ant Hines, Dan Mazer, Seth Rogen and Jeff Stilson	HBO
2005 (57th)	Late Night with Conan O'Brien	Mike Sweeney, Chris Albers, Jose Arroyo, Andy Blitz, Kevin Dorff, Daniel J. Goor, Michael Gordon, Brian Kiley, Michael Koman, Brian McCann, Guy Nicolucci, Conan O'Brien, Allison Silverman, Frank Smiley, Brian Stack and Andrew Weinberg	NBC
2005 (57th)	Late Show with David Letterman	Eric Stangel, Justin Stangel, Michael Barrie, Lee Ellenberg, Matthew Flanagan, Joe Grossman, David Letterman, David McHugh, Jim Mulholland, Gerard Mulligan, Matt Roberts, Tom Ruprecht, Frank Sebastiano, Jeremy Weiner and Steve Young	CBS
2005 (57th)	Real Time with Bill Maher	Scott Carter, David Feldman, Brian Jacobsmeyer, Jay Jaroch, Chris Kelly, Bill Maher, Billy Martin, Ned Rice and Danny Vermont	HBO
2006 (58th)
2006 (58th)	The Daily Show with Jon Stewart	Rich Blomquist, Steve Bodow, Rachel Axler, Kevin Bleyer, Tim Carvell, Stephen Colbert, Eric Drysdale, J. R. Havlan, Scott Jacobson, David Javerbaum, Ben Karlin, Rob Kutner, Sam Means, Chris Regan, Jason Reich, Jason Ross and Jon Stewart	Comedy Central
2006 (58th)	The Colbert Report	Michael Brumm, Stephen Colbert, Rich Dahm, Eric Drysdale, Rob Dubbin, Peter Gwinn, Jay Katsir, Laura Krafft, Frank Lesser and Allison Silverman	Comedy Central
2006 (58th)	Late Night with Conan O'Brien	Mike Sweeney, Chris Albers, Jose Arroyo, Andy Blitz, Dan Cronin, Kevin Dorff, Daniel J. Goor, Michael Gordon, Tim Harrod, Berkley Johnson, Brian Kiley, Michael Koman, Brian McCann, Guy Nicolucci, Conan O'Brien, Brian Stack and Andrew Weinberg	NBC
2006 (58th)	Late Show with David Letterman	Eric Stangel, Justin Stangel, Michael Barrie, Lee Ellenberg, Joe Grossman, David Letterman, Jim Mulholland, Matt Roberts, Tom Ruprecht, Sam Saltz, Meredith Scardino, Bill Scheft, Frank Sebastiano, Jeremy Weiner and Steve Young	CBS
2006 (58th)	Real Time with Bill Maher	Ross Abrash, Scott Carter, David Feldman, Matt Gunn, Brian Jacobsmeyer, Jay Jaroch, Chris Kelly, Bill Maher, Billy Martin and Danny Vermont	HBO
2007 (59th)
2007 (59th)	Late Night with Conan O'Brien	Mike Sweeney, Chris Albers, Jose Arroyo, Dan Cronin, Kevin Dorff, Dan Goor, Michael Gordon, Berkley Johnson, Brian Kiley, Michael Koman, Tim Harrod, Brian McCann, Guy Nicolucci, Conan O'Brien, Brian Stack and Andrew Weinberg	NBC
2007 (59th)	The Colbert Report	Stephen Colbert, Allison Silverman, Rich Dahm, Michael Brumm, Rob Dubbin, Eric Drysdale, Peter Gwinn, Jay Katsir, Laura Krafft and Frank Lesser	Comedy Central
2007 (59th)	The Daily Show with Jon Stewart	Steve Bodow, Rachel Axler, Kevin Bleyer, Rich Blomquist, Tim Carvell, J. R. Havlan, Scott Jacobson, David Javerbaum, Ben Karlin, Rob Kutner, Josh Lieb, Sam Means, Jason Reich, Jason Ross and Jon Stewart	Comedy Central
2007 (59th)	Late Show with David Letterman	Eric Stangel, Justin Stangel, Michael Barrie, Jim Mulholland, Steve Young, Tom Ruprecht, Lee Ellenberg, Matt Roberts, Jeremy Weiner, Joe Grossman, Meredith Scardino, Bill Scheft, Aaron Blitzstein, Bob Borden, Frank Sebastiano and David Letterman	CBS
2007 (59th)	Real Time with Bill Maher	David Feldman, Matt Gunn, Brian Jacobsmeyer, Jay Jaroch, Chris Kelly, Bill Maher, Billy Martin, Jonathan Schmock, Danny Vermont and Scott Carter	HBO
2008 (60th)
2008 (60th)	The Colbert Report	Tom Purcell, Stephen Colbert, Allison Silverman, Rich Dahm, Michael Brumm, Rob Dubbin, Eric Drysdale, Peter Gwinn, Jay Katsir, Laura Krafft, Frank Lesser, Glenn Eichler, Peter Grosz, Bryan Adams, Barry Julien and Meredith Scardino	Comedy Central
2008 (60th)	The Daily Show with Jon Stewart	Steve Bodow, Rory Albanese, Rachel Axler, Kevin Bleyer, Rich Blomquist, Tim Carvell, J. R. Havlan, Scott Jacobson, David Javerbaum, Rob Kutner, Josh Lieb, Sam Means, John Oliver, Jason Ross and Jon Stewart	Comedy Central
2008 (60th)	Late Night with Conan O'Brien	Mike Sweeney, Chris Albers, Jose Arroyo, Dan Cronin, Kevin Dorff, Daniel J. Goor, Michael Gordon, Berkley Johnson, Brian Kiley, Michael Koman, Brian McCann, Guy Nicolucci, Conan O'Brien, Matt O'Brien, Brian Stack and Andrew Weinberg	NBC
2008 (60th)	Late Show with David Letterman	Eric Stangel, Justin Stangel, Jim Mulholland, Michael Barrie, Steve Young, Tom Ruprecht, Lee Ellenberg, Matt Roberts, Jeremy Weiner, Joe Grossman, Bill Scheft, Bob Borden, Frank Sebastiano and David Letterman	CBS
2008 (60th)	Saturday Night Live	Seth Meyers, Harper Steele, Paula Pell, Doug Abeles, James Anderson, Alex Baze, Jim Downey, Charlie Grandy, Steve Higgins, Colin Jost, Erik Kenward, Rob Klein, John Lutz, Lorne Michaels, Simon Rich, Marika Sawyer, Akiva Schaffer, Robert Smigel, John Solomon, Emily Spivey, Kent Sublette, Bryan Tucker, Robert Carlock and Lauren Pomerantz	NBC
Outstanding Writing for a Variety, Music or Comedy Series
2009 (61st)
2009 (61st)	The Daily Show with Jon Stewart	Steve Bodow, Jon Stewart, David Javerbaum, Josh Lieb, Rory Albanese, Kevin Bleyer, Jason Ross, Tim Carvell, John Oliver, Sam Means, Rob Kutner, J. R. Havlan, Rich Blomquist, Wyatt Cenac, Elliott Kalan and Rachel Axler	Comedy Central
2009 (61st)	The Colbert Report	Tom Purcell, Stephen Colbert, Allison Silverman, Richard Dahm, Michael Brumm, Rob Dubbin, Opus Moreschi, Peter Gwinn, Jay Katsir, Frank Lesser, Glenn Eichler, Peter Grosz, Barry Julien and Meredith Scardino	Comedy Central
2009 (61st)	Late Night with Conan O'Brien	Mike Sweeney, Chris Albers, José Arroyo, Dan Cronin, Kevin Dorff, Andrés du Bouchet, Michael Gordon, Berkley Johnson, Brian Kiley, Todd Levin, Brian McCann, Guy Nicolucci, Conan O'Brien, Matt O'Brien, Brian Stack and Andrew Weinberg	NBC
2009 (61st)	Late Show with David Letterman	Eric Stangel, Justin Stangel, Michael Barrie, Jim Mulholland, Steve Young, Tom Ruprecht, Lee Ellenberg, Matt Roberts, Jeremy Weiner, Joe Grossman, Bill Scheft, Bob Borden, Frank Sebastiano and David Letterman	CBS
2009 (61st)	Saturday Night Live	Seth Meyers, Doug Abeles, James Anderson, Alex Baze, Jessica Conrad, James Downey, Steve Higgins, Colin Jost, Erik Kenward, Rob Klein, John Lutz, Lorne Michaels, John Mulaney, Paula Pell, Simon Rich, Marika Sawyer, Akiva Schaffer, John Solomon, Emily Spivey, Kent Sublette, Jorma Taccone and Bryan Tucker	NBC

=== 2010s ===
Year	Program	Writers	Network
Outstanding Writing for a Variety, Music or Comedy Series
2010 (62nd)
2010 (62nd)	The Colbert Report	Barry Julien, Stephen Colbert, Allison Silverman, Tom Purcell, Rich Dahm, Michael Brumm, Rob Dubbin, Opus Moreschi, Peter Gwinn, Jay Katsir, Frank Lesser, Glenn Eichler, Peter Grosz, Meredith Scardino, Max Werner and Eric Drysdale	Comedy Central
2010 (62nd)	The Daily Show with Jon Stewart	Steve Bodow, Rory Albanese, Kevin Bleyer, Rich Blomquist, Tim Carvell, Wyatt Cenac, Hallie Haglund, J. R. Havlan, David Javerbaum, Elliott Kalan, Josh Lieb, Sam Means, Jo Miller, John Oliver, Daniel Radosh, Jason Ross and Jon Stewart	Comedy Central
2010 (62nd)	Real Time with Bill Maher	Adam Felber, Matt Gunn, Brian Jacobsmeyer, Jay Jaroch, Chris Kelly, Bill Maher, Billy Martin, Jonathan Schmock, Danny Vermont and Scott Carter	HBO
2010 (62nd)	Saturday Night Live	Doug Abeles, James Anderson, Alex Baze, Jillian Bell, Hannibal Buress, Jessica Conrad, James Downey, Steve Higgins, Colin Jost, Erik Kenward, Jessi Klein, Rob Klein, John Lutz, Seth Meyers, Lorne Michaels, John Mulaney, Christine Nangle, Michael Patrick O'Brien, Paula Pell, Ryan Perez, Simon Rich, Marika Sawyer, Akiva Schaffer, John Solomon, Emily Spivey, Kent Sublette, Jorma Taccone and Bryan Tucker	NBC
2010 (62nd)	The Tonight Show with Conan O'Brien	Mike Sweeney, Conan O'Brien, Chris Albers, José Arroyo, Deon Cole, Josh Comers, Dan Cronin, Kevin Dorff, Andrés du Bouchet, Michael Gordon, Berkley Johnson, Brian Kiley, Rob Kutner, Todd Levin, Brian McCann, Guy Nicolucci, Matt O'Brien, Andy Richter, Brian Stack and Andrew Weinberg	NBC
2011 (63rd)
2011 (63rd)	The Daily Show with Jon Stewart	Steve Bodow, Rory Albanese, Kevin Bleyer, Rich Blomquist, Tim Carvell, Wyatt Cenac, Hallie Haglund, J. R. Havlan, David Javerbaum, Elliott Kalan, Josh Lieb, Sam Means, Jo Miller, John Oliver, Daniel Radosh, Jason Ross and Jon Stewart	Comedy Central
2011 (63rd)	The Colbert Report	Barry Julien, Stephen Colbert, Tom Purcell, Richard Dahm, Michael Brumm, Rob Dubbin, Opus Moreschi, Peter Gwinn, Jay Katsir, Frank Lesser, Glenn Eichler, Meredith Scardino, Max Werner, Eric Drysdale, Scott Sherman, Dan Guterman and Paul Dinello	Comedy Central
2011 (63rd)	Conan	Mike Sweeney, Conan O'Brien, Andy Richter, Frank Smiley, José Arroyo, Andrés du Bouchet, Deon Cole, Josh Comers, Dan Cronin, Michael Gordon, Berkley Johnson, Brian Kiley, Laurie Kilmartin, Rob Kutner, Todd Levin, Brian McCann, Matt O'Brien and Brian Stack	TBS
2011 (63rd)	Late Night with Jimmy Fallon	A. D. Miles, David Angelo, Patrick Borelli, Michael Blieden, Gerard Bradford, Jeremy Bronson, Michael DiCenzo, Jimmy Fallon, Eric Ledgin, Morgan Murphy, Robert Patton, Gavin Purcell, Amy Ozols, Diallo Riddle, Bashir Salahuddin, Justin Shanes, Michael Shoemaker, Jon Rineman and Bobby Tisdale	NBC
2011 (63rd)	Saturday Night Live	Doug Abeles, James Anderson, Alex Baze, Heather Anne Campbell, Jessica Conrad, Matt Craig, James Downey, Tom Flanigan, Shelly Gossman, Steve Higgins, Erik Kenward, Rob Klein, Seth Meyers, Lorne Michaels, John Mulaney, Christine Nangle, Michael Patrick O'Brien, Paula Pell, Simon Rich, Marika Sawyer, Akiva Schaffer, Sarah Schneider, John Solomon, Kent Sublette, Bryan Tucker, Jorma Taccone and Colin Jost	NBC
Outstanding Writing for a Variety Series
2012 (64th)
2012 (64th)	The Daily Show with Jon Stewart	Tim Carvell, Rory Albanese, Kevin Bleyer, Rich Blomquist, Steve Bodow, Wyatt Cenac, Hallie Haglund, J. R. Havlan, Elliott Kalan, Dan McCoy, Jo Miller, John Oliver, Zhubin Parang, Daniel Radosh, Jason Ross and Jon Stewart	Comedy Central
2012 (64th)	The Colbert Report	Barry Julien, Stephen Colbert, Tom Purcell, Richard Dahm, Michael Brumm, Rob Dubbin, Opus Moreschi, Peter Gwinn, Jay Katsir, Frank Lesser, Glenn Eichler, Meredith Scardino, Max Werner, Eric Drysdale, Scott Sherman, Dan Guterman and Paul Dinello	Comedy Central
2012 (64th)	Portlandia	Fred Armisen, Carrie Brownstein, Jonathan Krisel and Karey Dornetto	IFC
2012 (64th)	Real Time with Bill Maher	Adam Felber, Matt Gunn, Brian Jacobsmeyer, Jay Jaroch, Chris Kelly, Mike Larsen, Bill Maher, Billy Martin and Scott Carter	HBO
2012 (64th)	Saturday Night Live	James Anderson, Alex Baze, Jessica Conrad, James Downey, Shelly Gossman, Steve Higgins, Zach Kanin, Chris Kelly, Colin Jost, Erik Kenward, Rob Klein, Seth Meyers, Lorne Michaels, John Mulaney, Christine Nangle, Michael Patrick O'Brien, Paula Pell, Marika Sawyer, Sarah Schneider, Pete Schultz, John Solomon, Kent Sublette, Bryan Tucker and Emily Spivey	NBC
2013 (65th)
2013 (65th)	The Colbert Report	Opus Moreschi, Stephen Colbert, Tom Purcell, Rich Dahm, Barry Julien, Michael Brumm, Rob Dubbin, Jay Katsir, Frank Lesser, Glenn Eichler, Meredith Scardino, Max Werner, Eric Drysdale, Dan Guterman, Paul Dinello, Nate Charny and Bobby Mort	Comedy Central
2013 (65th)	The Daily Show with Jon Stewart	Tim Carvell, Rory Albanese, Kevin Bleyer, Steve Bodow, Travon Free, Hallie Haglund, J. R. Havlan, Elliott Kalan, Dan McCoy, Jo Miller, John Oliver, Zhubin Parang, Daniel Radosh, Jason Ross, Lauren Sarver and Jon Stewart	Comedy Central
2013 (65th)	Jimmy Kimmel Live!	Gary Greenberg, Molly McNearney, Tony Barbieri, Jonathan Bines, Sal Iacono, Jimmy Kimmel, Rick Rosner, Danny Ricker, Eric Immerman, Jeff Loveness, Josh Halloway, Bess Kalb, Joelle Boucai and Bryan Paulk	ABC
2013 (65th)	Portlandia	Fred Armisen, Carrie Brownstein, Jonathan Krisel and Bill Oakley	IFC
2013 (65th)	Real Time with Bill Maher	Adam Felber, Matt Gunn, Brian Jacobsmeyer, Jay Jaroch, Chris Kelly, Bill Maher, Billy Martin, Danny Vermont and Scott Carter	HBO
2013 (65th)	Saturday Night Live	James Anderson, Alex Baze, Neil Casey, James Downey, Steve Higgins, Colin Jost, Zach Kanin, Chris Kelly, Joe Kelly, Erik Kenward, Rob Klein, Seth Meyers, Lorne Michaels, Michael Patrick O'Brien, Josh Patten, Marika Sawyer, Sarah Schneider, Pete Schultz, John Solomon, Kent Sublette, Bryan Tucker and Robert Smigel	NBC
2014 (66th)
2014 (66th)	The Colbert Report	Opus Moreschi, Stephen Colbert, Tom Purcell, Richard Dahm, Barry Julien, Michael Brumm, Rob Dubbin, Jay Katsir, Frank Lesser, Glenn Eichler, Meredith Scardino, Max Werner, Eric Drysdale, Paul Dinello, Nate Charny, Sam Kim, Aaron Cohen, Gabe Gronli and Matt Lappin	Comedy Central
2014 (66th)	The Daily Show with Jon Stewart	Elliott Kalan, Tim Carvell, Steve Bodow, Dan Amira, Travon Free, Hallie Haglund, J. R. Havlan, Matt Koff, Dan McCoy, Jo Miller, Zhubin Parang, Daniel Radosh, Lauren Sarver, Jon Stewart, Rory Albanese and John Oliver	Comedy Central
2014 (66th)	Inside Amy Schumer	Jessi Klein, Amy Schumer, Emily Altman, Jeremy Beiler, Neil Casey, Kurt Metzger, Kyle Dunnigan, Christine Nangle and Daniel Powell	Comedy Central
2014 (66th)	Key & Peele	Jay Martel, Ian Roberts, Jordan Peele, Keegan-Michael Key, Alex Rubens, Rebecca Drysdale, Colton Dunn, Rich Talarico and Charlie Sanders	Comedy Central
2014 (66th)	Portlandia	Fred Armisen, Carrie Brownstein, Jonathan Krisel, Graham Wagner and Karey Dornetto	IFC
2014 (66th)	The Tonight Show Starring Jimmy Fallon	A. D. Miles, Patrick Borelli, Gerard Bradford, Luke Cunningham, Mike DiCenzo, Mike Drucker, Jess Dweck, Dicky Eagan, Jimmy Fallon, John Haskel, Josh Lieb, Arthur Meyer, Chase Mitchell, Dan Opsal, Gavin Purcell, Jon Rineman, Albertina Rizzo, Jason Ross, David Young and Michael Jann	NBC
2015 (67th)
2015 (67th)	The Daily Show with Jon Stewart	Elliott Kalan, Adam Lowitt, Steve Bodow, Jon Stewart, Dan Amira, Travon Free, Hallie Haglund, Matt Koff, Dan McCoy, Jo Miller, Zhubin Parang, Daniel Radosh, Lauren Sarver, Owen Parsons and Delaney Yeager	Comedy Central
2015 (67th)	The Colbert Report	Opus Moreschi, Stephen Colbert, Tom Purcell, Barry Julien, Paul Dinello, Matt Lappin, Jay Katsir, Michael Brumm, Rob Dubbin, Glenn Eichler, Max Werner, Eric Drysdale, Nate Charny, Aaron Cohen, Gabe Gronli and Ariel Dumas	Comedy Central
2015 (67th)	Inside Amy Schumer	Jessi Klein, Hallie Cantor, Kim Caramele, Kyle Dunnigan, Jon Glaser, Christine Nangle, Kurt Metzger, Daniel Powell, Tami Sagher and Amy Schumer	Comedy Central
2015 (67th)	Key & Peele	Jay Martel, Ian Roberts, Keegan-Michael Key, Jordan Peele, Rebecca Drysdale, Colton Dunn, Alex Rubens, Charlie Sanders, Rich Talarico and Phil Augusta Jackson	Comedy Central
2015 (67th)	Last Week Tonight with John Oliver	Kevin Avery, Tim Carvell, Dan Gurewitch, Geoff Haggerty, Jeff Maurer, John Oliver, Scott Sherman, Will Tracy, Jill Twiss, Juli Weiner and Josh Gondelman	HBO
2016 (68th)
2016 (68th)	Last Week Tonight with John Oliver	Kevin Avery, Tim Carvell, Josh Gondelman, Dan Gurewitch, Geoff Haggerty, Jeff Maurer, John Oliver, Scott Sherman, Will Tracy, Jill Twiss and Juli Weiner	HBO
2016 (68th)	Full Frontal with Samantha Bee	Jo Miller, Samantha Bee, Ashley Nicole Black, Pat Cassels, Mathan Erhardt, Joe Grossman, Jason Reich, Melinda Taub and Eric Drysdale	TBS
2016 (68th)	Inside Amy Schumer	Michael Lawrence, Amy Schumer, Jessi Klein, Daniel Powell, Christine Nangle, Kim Caramele, Kyle Dunnigan, Tami Sagher, Kurt Metzger and Claudia O'Doherty	Comedy Central
2016 (68th)	Key & Peele	Jay Martel, Alex Rubens, Rebecca Drysdale, Colton Dunn, Phil Augusta Jackson, Ian Roberts, Charlie Sanders, Rich Talarico, Jordan Peele and Keegan-Michael Key	Comedy Central
2016 (68th)	Portlandia	Fred Armisen, Carrie Brownstein, Jonathan Krisel, Graham Wagner and Karey Dornetto	IFC
2016 (68th)	Saturday Night Live	Rob Klein, Bryan Tucker, James Anderson, Fred Armisen, Jeremy Beiler, Chris Belair, Megan Callahan, Michael Che, Mikey Day, Fran Gillespie, Sudi Green, Steve Higgins, Colin Jost, Zach Kanin, Chris Kelly, Erik Kenward, Paul Masella, Dave McCary, Dennis McNicholas, Seth Meyers, Lorne Michaels, Josh Patten, Katie Rich, Tim Robinson, Sarah Schneider, Pete Schultz, Streeter Seidell, Dave Sirus, Will Stephen, Kent Sublette and Julio Torres	NBC
2017 (69th)
2017 (69th)	Last Week Tonight with John Oliver	Kevin Avery, Tim Carvell, Josh Gondelman, Dan Gurewitch, Geoff Haggerty, Jeff Maurer, John Oliver, Scott Sherman, Will Tracy, Jill Twiss and Juli Weiner	HBO
2017 (69th)	Full Frontal with Samantha Bee	Jo Miller, Samantha Bee, Ashley Nicole Black, Pat Cassels, Eric Drysdale, Mathan Erhardt, Travon Free, Joe Grossman, Miles Kahn, Melinda Taub and Jason Reich	TBS
2017 (69th)	Late Night with Seth Meyers	Jermaine Affonso, Alex Baze, Bryan Donaldson, Sal Gentile, Matt Goldich, Dina Gusovsky, Jenny Hagel, Allison Hord, Mike Karnell, John Lutz, Seth Meyers, Ian Morgan, Conner O'Malley, Seth Reiss, Amber Ruffin, Mike Shoemaker, Mike Scollins and Ben Warheit	NBC
2017 (69th)	The Late Show with Stephen Colbert	Jay Katsir, Opus Moreschi, Stephen Colbert, Tom Purcell, Barry Julien, Matt Lappin, Michael Brumm, Nate Charny, Aaron Cohen, Cullen Crawford, Paul Dinello, Ariel Dumas, Glenn Eichler, Django Gold, Gabe Gronli, Daniel Kibblesmith, Michael Pielocik, Kate Sidley, Jen Spyra, Brian Stack and John Thibodeaux	CBS
2017 (69th)	Saturday Night Live	Chris Kelly, Sarah Schneider, Kent Sublette, Bryan Tucker, Pete Schultz, James Anderson, Kristen Bartlett, Jeremy Beiler, Zack Bornstein, Joanna Bradley, Megan Callahan, Michael Che, Anna Drezen, Fran Gillespie, Sudi Green, Steve Higgins, Colin Jost, Erik Kenward, Rob Klein, Nick Kocher, Dave McCary, Brian McElhaney, Dennis McNicholas, Drew Michael, Lorne Michaels, Josh Patten, Katie Rich, Streeter Seidell, Will Stephen and Julio Torres	NBC
2018 (70th)
2018 (70th)	Last Week Tonight with John Oliver	John Oliver, Tim Carvell, Raquel D'Apice, Josh Gondelman, Dan Gurewitch, Geoff Haggerty, Jeff Maurer, Brian Parise, Scott Sherman, Ben Silva, Will Tracy, Jill Twiss, Seena Vali and Juli Weiner	HBO
2018 (70th)	Full Frontal with Samantha Bee	Melinda Taub, Samantha Bee, Pat Cassels, Mike Drucker, Eric Drysdale, Mathan Erhardt, Travon Free, Miles Kahn, Nicole Silverberg, Ashley Nicole Black and Joe Grossman	TBS
2018 (70th)	Late Night with Seth Meyers	Jermaine Affonso, Alex Baze, Bryan Donaldson, Sal Gentile, Matt Goldich, Dina Gusovsky, Jenny Hagel, Allison Hord, Mike Karnell, John Lutz, Seth Meyers, Ian Morgan, Seth Reiss, Amber Ruffin, Mike Scollins, Mike Shoemaker and Ben Warheit	NBC
2018 (70th)	The Late Show with Stephen Colbert	Jay Katsir, Opus Moreschi, Michael Brumm, Nate Charny, Aaron Cohen, Stephen Colbert, Cullen Crawford, Paul Dinello, Ariel Dumas, Glenn Eichler, Django Gold, Gabe Gronli, Barry Julien, Daniel Kibblesmith, Matt Lappin, Michael Pielocik, Tom Purcell, Kate Sidley, Jen Spyra, Brian Stack and John Thibodeaux	CBS
2018 (70th)	Saturday Night Live	Michael Che, Colin Jost, Kent Sublette, Bryan Tucker, James Anderson, Steven Castillo, Andrew Dismukes, Megan Callahan, Anna Drezen, Claire Friedman, Steve Higgins, Sam Jay, Erik Kenward, Michael Koman, Dave McCary, Dennis McNicholas, Lorne Michaels, Nimesh Patel, Josh Patten, Katie Rich, Gary Richardson, Pete Schultz, Will Stephen, Julio Torres, Stephen Glover, Jamal Olori, Tim Kalpakis, Erik Marino, Fran Gillespie, Sudi Green, Streeter Seidell	NBC
2019 (71st)
2019 (71st)	Last Week Tonight with John Oliver	Dan Gurewitch, Jeff Maurer, Jill Twiss, Juli Weiner, Tim Carvell, Raquel D'Apice, Josh Gondelman, Daniel O'Brien, John Oliver, Owen Parsons, Charlie Redd, Joanna Rothkopf, Ben Silva and Seena Vali	HBO
2019 (71st)	Documentary Now!	John Mulaney and Seth Meyers	IFC
2019 (71st)	Full Frontal with Samantha Bee	Melinda Taub, Samantha Bee, Miles Kahn, Kristen Bartlett, Mike Drucker, Pat Cassels, Eric Drysdale, Mathan Erhardt, Nicole Silverberg, Ashley Nicole Black, Joe Grossman and Allison Silverman	TBS
2019 (71st)	Late Night with Seth Meyers	Jermaine Affonso, Alex Baze, Karen Chee, Bryan Donaldson, Sal Gentile, Matt Goldich, Dina Gusovsky, Jenny Hagel, Allison Hord, Michael Karnell, John Lutz, Seth Meyers, Ian Morgan, Seth Reiss, Amber Ruffin, Mike Scollins, Mike Shoemaker and Ben Warheit	NBC
2019 (71st)	The Late Show with Stephen Colbert	Opus Moreschi, Jay Katsir, Aaron Cohen, Stephen Colbert, Tom Purcell, Barry Julien, Paul Dinello, Matt Lappin, Michael Brumm, Emmy Blotnick, Cullen Crawford, Ariel Dumas, Glenn Eichler, Django Gold, Gabe Gronli, Greg Iwinski, Daniel Kibblesmith, Kate Sidley, Jen Spyra, Brian Stack, John Thibodeaux, Michael Pielocik, Asher Perlman and Eliana Kwartler	CBS
2019 (71st)	Saturday Night Live	Michael Che, Colin Jost, Kent Sublette, Bryan Tucker, James Anderson, Steven Castillo, Andrew Dismukes, Anna Drezen, Alison Gates, Steve Higgins, Sam Jay, Erik Kenward, Michael Koman, Alan Linic, Eli Coyote Mandel, Lorne Michaels, John Mulaney, Josh Patten, Simon Rich, Gary Richardson, Pete Schultz, Marika Sawyer, Will Stephen, Julio Torres, Bowen Yang, Megan Callahan, Dennis McNicholas, Katie Rich, Fran Gillespie, Sudi Green and Streeter Seidell	NBC

=== 2020s ===
Year	Program	Writers	Network
2020 (72nd)
2020 (72nd)	Last Week Tonight with John Oliver	Dan Gurewitch, Jeff Maurer, Jill Twiss, Juli Weiner, John Oliver, Tim Carvell, Daniel O'Brien, Owen Parsons, Charlie Redd, Joanna Rothkopf, Ben Silva and Seena Vali	HBO
2020 (72nd)	The Daily Show with Trevor Noah	Dan Amira, Lauren Sarver Means, Daniel Radosh, David Angelo, Devin Delliquanti, Zach DiLanzo, Geoff Haggerty, Josh Johnson, David Kibuuka, Matt Koff, X Mayo, Christiana Mbakwe, Dan McCoy, Trevor Noah, Joseph Opio, Randall Otis, Zhubin Parang, Kat Radley and Scott Sherman	Comedy Central
2020 (72nd)	Full Frontal with Samantha Bee	Samantha Bee, Pat Cassels, Kristen Bartlett, Mike Drucker, Melinda Taub, Nicole Silverberg, Joe Grossman, Sean Crespo, Mathan Erhardt, Miles Kahn, Sahar Rizvi and Allison Silverman	TBS
2020 (72nd)	Late Night with Seth Meyers	Alex Baze, Jermaine Affonso, Karen Chee, Bryan Donaldson, Sal Gentile, Matt Goldich, Dina Gusovsky, Jenny Hagel, Allison Hord, Mike Karnell, John Lutz, Seth Meyers, Ian Morgan, Seth Reiss, Amber Ruffin, Mike Scollins, Mike Shoemaker and Ben Warheit	NBC
2020 (72nd)	The Late Show with Stephen Colbert	Ariel Dumas, Jay Katsir, Stephen Colbert, Michael Brumm, River Clegg, Aaron Cohen, Nicole Conlan, Paul Dinello, Glenn Eichler, Django Gold, Gabe Gronli, Barry Julien, Daniel Kibblesmith, Eliana Kwartler, Matt Lappin, Felipe Torres Medina, Opus Moreschi, Asher Perlman, Tom Purcell, Kate Sidley, Brian Stack, John Thibodeaux and Steve Waltien	CBS
2021 (73rd)
2021 (73rd)	Last Week Tonight with John Oliver	Johnathan Appel, Ali Barthwell, Tim Carvell, Liz Hynes, Greg Iwinski, Mark Kramer, Daniel O'Brien, John Oliver, Owen Parsons, Charlie Redd, Joanna Rothkopf, Chrissy Shackelford, Ben Silva and Seena Vali	HBO
2021 (73rd)	The Amber Ruffin Show	Jenny Hagel, Demi Adejuyigbe, Ashley Nicole Black, Michael Harriot, Shantira Jackson, Ian Morgan, Dewayne Perkins and Amber Ruffin	Peacock
2021 (73rd)	A Black Lady Sketch Show	Lauren Ashley Smith, Robin Thede, Ashley Nicole Black, Akilah Green, Shenovia Large, Rae Sanni, Kristin Layne Tucker, Holly Walker and Kindsey Young	HBO
2021 (73rd)	The Late Show with Stephen Colbert	Ariel Dumas, Jay Katsir, Stephen T. Colbert, Delmonte Bent, Michael Brumm, River Clegg, Aaron Cohen, Nicole Conlan, Paul Dinello, Glenn Eichler, Django Gold, Gabe Gronli, Barry Julien, Michael Cruz Kayne, Eliana Kwartler, Matt Lappin, Pratima Mani, Felipe Torres Medina, Opus Moreschi, Asher Perlman, Tom Purcell, Kate Sidley, Brian Stack, John Thibodeaux and Steve Waltien	CBS
2021 (73rd)	Saturday Night Live	Dan Bulla, Steven Castillo, Megan Callahan-Shah, Michael Che, Anna Drezen, Alison Gates, Fran Gillespie, Sudi Green, Steve Higgins, Colin Jost, Erik Kenward, Dan Licata, Jasmine Pierce, Dennis McNicholas, Lorne Michaels, Josh Patten, Gary Richardson, Pete Schultz, Streeter Seidell, Mark Steinbach, Will Stephen, Kent Sublette, Bryan Tucker, Celeste Yim, Dave Sirus, Mike Lawrence, Emma Clark and Sam Jay	NBC
2022 (74th)
2022 (74th)	Last Week Tonight with John Oliver	Daniel O'Brien, Owen Parsons, Charlie Redd, Joanna Rothkopf, Seena Vali, Johnathan Appel, Ali Barthwell, Tim Carvell, Liz Hynes, Greg Iwinski, Ryan Ken, Mark Kramer, Sofía Manfredi, John Oliver, Taylor Kay Phillips and Chrissy Shackelford	HBO
2022 (74th)	A Black Lady Sketch Show	Tracey Ashley, Robin Thede, Alrinthea Carter, Michelle Davis, Sonia Denis, Jonterri Gadson, Chloé Hilliard, Shenovia Large and Natalie McGill	HBO
2022 (74th)	The Daily Show with Trevor Noah	Dan Amira, Lauren Sarver Means, Daniel Radosh, David Angelo, Devin Delliquanti, Zach DiLanzo, Jen Flanz, Jason Gilbert, Josh Johnson, David Kibuuka, Matt Koff, Christiana Mbakwe, Trevor Noah, Joseph Opio, Randall Otis, Zhubin Parang, Kat Radley, Scott Sherman and Ashton Womack	Comedy Central
2022 (74th)	The Late Show with Stephen Colbert	Ariel Dumas, Jay Katsir, Delmonte Bent, Michael Brumm, Aaron Cohen, Stephen T. Colbert, Paul Dinello, Glenn Eichler, Gabe Gronli, Barry Julien, Michael Cruz Kayne, Eliana Kwartler, Matt Lappin, Caroline Lazar, Pratima Mani, Felipe Torres Medina, Opus Moreschi, Carley Moseley, Asher Perlman, Tom Purcell, Kate Sidley, Brian Stack, John Thibodeaux and Steve Waltien	CBS
2022 (74th)	Saturday Night Live	Michael Che, Alison Gates, Streeter Seidell, Colin Jost, Kent Sublette, Bryan Tucker, Dan Bulla, Mike DiCenzo, Billy Domineau, Alex English, Martin Herlihy, Steve Higgins, John Higgins, Vannessa Jackson, Erik Kenward, Tesha Kondrat, Ben Marshall, Lorne Michaels, Jake Nordwind, Ben Silva, Will Stephen, Celeste Yim, Anna Drezen, Steven Castillo, Rob Klein, Jasmine Pierce, Rosebud Baker, Clare O'Kane, Pete Schultz, Megan Callahan-Shah, Dennis McNicholas, Josh Patten and Mark Steinbach	NBC
2023 (75th)
2023 (75th)	Last Week Tonight with John Oliver	Daniel O'Brien, Owen Parsons, Charlie Redd, Joanna Rothkopf, Seena Vali, Johnathan Appel, Ali Barthwell, Tim Carvell, Liz Hynes, Ryan Ken, Mark Kramer, Sofia Manfredi, John Oliver, Taylor Kay Phillips and Chrissy Shackelford	HBO
2023 (75th)	The Daily Show with Trevor Noah	Dan Amira, Lauren Sarver Means, Daniel Radosh, David Angelo, Devin Delliquanti, Zach DiLanzo, Jen Flanz, Jason Gilbert, Josh Johnson, David Kibuuka, Matt Koff, Trevor Noah, Joseph Opio, Randall Otis, Zhubin Parang, Kat Radley, Scott Sherman and Ashton Womack	Comedy Central
2023 (75th)	Late Night with Seth Meyers	Alex Baze, Seth Reiss, Mike Scollins, Sal Gentile, Jermaine Affonso, Karen Chee, Bryan Donaldson, Matt Goldich, Dina Gusovsky, Jenny Hagel, Allison Hord, Mike Karnell, John Lutz, Seth Meyers, Ian Morgan, Amber Ruffin, Mike Shoemaker, Ben Warheit and Jeff Wright	NBC
2023 (75th)	The Late Show with Stephen Colbert	Ariel Dumas, Jay Katsir, Delmonte Bent, Michael Brumm, Aaron Cohen, Stephen T. Colbert, Paul Dinello, Glenn Eichler, Gabe Gronli, Barry Julien, Michael Cruz Kayne, Eliana Kwartler, Matt Lappin, Caroline Lazar, Pratima Mani, Felipe Torres Medina, Opus Moreschi, Carley Moseley, Asher Perlman, Tom Purcell, Kate Sidley, Brian Stack, John Thibodeaux and Steve Waltien	CBS
2023 (75th)	Saturday Night Live	Alison Gates, Streeter Seidell, Kent Sublette, Gary Richardson, Will Stephen, Celeste Yim, Bryan Tucker, Rosebud Baker, Dan Bulla, Michael Che, Mike DiCenzo, Alex English, Jimmy Fowlie, Martin Herlihy, John Higgins, Steve Higgins, Vannessa Jackson, Colin Jost, Erik Kenward, Ben Marshall, Lorne Michaels, Jake Nordwind, Ceara O'Sullivan, Clare O'Kane, Ben Silva, Asha Ward, Auguste White, Pete Schultz, Megan Callahan-Shah, Dennis McNicholas, Josh Patten and KC Shornima	NBC
2024 (76th)
2024 (76th)	Last Week Tonight with John Oliver	Daniel O'Brien, Owen Parsons, Charlie Redd, Joanna Rothkopf, Seena Vali, Johnathan Appel, Ali Barthwell, Tim Carvell, Liz Hynes, Ryan Ken, Mark Kramer, Sofía Manfredi, John Oliver, Taylor Kay Phillips and Chrissy Shackelford	HBO
2024 (76th)	The Daily Show	Dan Amira, Lauren Sarver Means, Daniel Radosh, David Angelo, Nicole Conlan, Devin Delliquanti, Zach DiLanzo, Jen Flanz, Jason Gilbert, Dina Hashem, Scott Hercman, Josh Johnson, David Kibuuka, Matt Koff, Matt O'Brien, Joseph Opio, Randall Otis, Zhubin Parang, Kat Radley, Lanee' Sanders, Scott Sherman, Jon Stewart, Ashton Womack and Sophie Zucker	Comedy Central
2024 (76th)	Saturday Night Live	Kent Sublette, Streeter Seidell, Alison Gates, Gary Richardson, Will Stephen, Celeste Yim, Bryan Tucker, Rosebud Baker, Dan Bulla, Steven Castillo, Michael Che, Mike DiCenzo, Alex English, Jimmy Fowlie, Martin Herlihy, John Higgins, Steve Higgins, Vannessa Jackson, Colin Jost, Erik Kenward, Ben Marshall, Dave McCary, Lorne Michaels, Jake Nordwind, Ceara O'Sullivan, Ben Silva, Julio Torres, Asha Ward, Auguste White, Pete Schultz, Megan Callahan-Shah, Dennis McNicholas, Josh Patten and KC Shornima	NBC
2025 (77th)
2025 (77th)	Last Week Tonight with John Oliver	Daniel O'Brien, Owen Parsons, Charlie Redd, Joanna Rothkopf, Seena Vali, Johnathan Appel, Ali Barthwell, Tim Carvell, Liz Hynes, Ryan Ken, Sofía Manfredi, John Oliver, Taylor Kay Phillips and Chrissy Shackelford	HBO
2025 (77th)	The Daily Show	Dan Amira, Daniel Radosh, Lauren Sarver Means, David Angelo, Nicole Conlan, Devin Delliquanti, Zach DiLanzo, Jen Flanz, Jason Gilbert, Dina Hashem, Scott Hercman, David Kibuuka, Matt Koff, Matt O'Brien, Joseph Opio, Randall Otis, Zhubin Parang, Kat Radley, Lanee' Sanders, Scott Sherman, Jon Stewart, Ashton Womack and Sophie Zucker	Comedy Central
2025 (77th)	Saturday Night Live	Kent Sublette, Streeter Seidell, Alison Gates, Dan Bulla, Will Stephen, Auguste White, Celeste Yim, Bryan Tucker, Steven Castillo, Michael Che, Mike DiCenzo, Jimmy Fowlie, Martin Herlihy, John Higgins, Steve Higgins, Colin Jost, Erik Kenward, Allie Levitan, Ben Marshall, Lorne Michaels, Jake Nordwind, Ceara O'Sullivan, Moss Perricone, Carl Tart, Asha Ward, Pete Schultz, Rosebud Baker, Megan Callahan-Shah, Dennis McNicholas, Josh Patten and KC Shornima	NBC
2026 (78th)
2026 (78th)	The Late Show with Stephen Colbert	Ariel Dumas, Jay Katsir, Delmonte Bent, Michael Brumm, Aaron Cohen, Stephen T. Colbert, Paul Dinello, Gabe Gronli, Barry Julien, Michael Cruz Kayne, Eliana Kwartler, Matt Lappin, Caroline Lazar, Pratima Mani, Felipe Torres Medina, Opus Moreschi, Carley Moseley, Aaron Nemo, Asher Perlman, Tom Purcell, Kate Sidley, Brian Stack, John Thibodeaux and Steve Waltien	CBS
2026 (78th)	Jimmy Kimmel Live!	Molly McNearney, Danny Ricker, Gary Greenberg, Josh Halloway, Jamie Abrahams, Rory Albanese, Tony Barbieri, Jonathan Bines, Joelle Boucai, Bryan Cook, Devin Field, Eric Immerman, Jesse Joyce, Laurie Kilmartin, Jimmy Kimmel, Gregory Martin, Jesse McLaren, Keaton Patti, Louis Virtel and Troy Walker	ABC
2026 (78th)	Last Week Tonight with John Oliver	Daniel O'Brien, Owen Parsons, Charlie Redd, Joanna Rothkopf, Seena Vali, Johnathan Appel, Ali Barthwell, Tim Carvell, Liz Hynes, Ryan Ken, Sofía Manfredi, John Oliver, Taylor Kay Phillips and Chrissy Shackelford	HBO

== Programs with multiple wins ==
10 wins

- Last Week Tonight with John Oliver (consecutive)

9 wins

- The Daily Show with Jon Stewart (4 consecutive, then 2 consecutive)

5 wins

- The Carol Burnett Show (4 consecutive)

4 wins

- The Colbert Report (2 consecutive)
- Dennis Miller Live (3 consecutive)
- Late Night with David Letterman (consecutive)
- Saturday Night Live (2 consecutive)

2 wins

- SCTV Network (consecutive)

== Programs with multiple nominations ==
31 nominations

- Saturday Night Live

20 nominations

- The Daily Show

16 nominations

- Late Show with David Letterman

14 nominations

- Late Night with Conan O'Brien
- Late Night with David Letterman

12 nominations

- The Carol Burnett Show
- Last Week Tonight with John Oliver

10 nominations

- The Colbert Report

9 nominations

- SCTV Network

8 nominations

- The Late Show with Stephen Colbert

6 nominations

- Dennis Miller Live
- Real Time with Bill Maher

5 nominations

- Full Frontal with Samantha Bee
- Late Night with Seth Meyers
- Rowan & Martin's Laugh-In
- The Tonight Show Starring Johnny Carson

4 nominations

- The Chris Rock Show
- The Muppet Show
- Portlandia
- The Tracey Ullman Show

3 nominations

- The Flip Wilson Show
- In Living Color
- Inside Amy Schumer
- Key & Peele
- The Kids in the Hall
- Politically Incorrect with Bill Maher
- The Sonny & Cher Comedy Hour

2 nominations

- A Black Lady Sketch Show
- The Danny Kaye Show
- Jimmy Kimmel Live!
- Mr. Show with Bob and David
- Mystery Science Theater 3000
- The Smothers Brothers Comedy Hour
- Tracey Takes On...

== See also ==
- Primetime Emmy Award for Outstanding Writing for a Comedy Series
- Primetime Emmy Award for Outstanding Writing for a Variety Special
