= Lancelot Link, Secret Chimp =

Television series

- Genre: Action/Adventure; Comedy
- Created by: Stan Burns; Mike Marmer
- Starring: Tonga (chimpanzee)
- Voices of: Dayton Allen; Joan Gerber; Bernie Kopell
- Narrated by: Malachi Throne
- Composer: Bob Emenegger
- Country of origin: United States
- Original language: English
- No. of seasons: 2
- No. of episodes: 13/17

Production
- Producers: Stan Burns; Mike Marmer
- Camera setup: Single-camera
- Running time: 45–48 minutes; (1970–1971); 22–24 minutes; (1971–1972)
- Production company: Sandler-Burns-Marmer Productions

Original release
- Network: ABC
- Release: September 12, 1970 – January 2, 1971

Lancelot Link, Secret Chimp is an American action/adventure comedy television series originally aired Saturday mornings on ABC from September 12, 1970, to January 2, 1971, and rebroadcast the following season. The live-action film series featured a cast of chimpanzees given apparent speaking roles by overdubbing with human voices.

== Production ==
Lancelot Link, Secret Chimp had a "seven-figure budget" with location filming, props and costumes, and the laborious staging and training of the animals. The filmmakers made the most of the budget, staging multiple episodes with the same settings and wardrobe, occasionally reusing the more elaborate chase footage. Lance Link drove a 1970 Datsun Sports 2000 while villain Baron Von Butcher (and his chauffeur Creto) used a late-'50s Rolls-Royce Silver Cloud. The primates themselves rode Kawasaki MB-1 Coyote minibikes in a number of episodes.

Two of the three producers/creators were Stan Burns and Mike Marmer, former writers for Get Smart! Both resigned from their jobs as head writers on The Carol Burnett Show to work on Lancelot Link, Secret Chimp.

According to The Believer, "to make the dialogue fit the chimps’ lip action, Burns and Marmer went to ridiculous lengths. Voiceovers were ad-libbed on the set, giving birth to beautifully absurd moments of the chimps breaking into songs at the end of sentences or spontaneously reciting Mother Goose rhymes just so it would look right." Co-producer Allan Sandler explained that the writers studied the silent film footage of the chimps, and counted the syllables as the chimps' mouths moved. The writers would then shorten or lengthen the scripted lines according to the syllable count.

== Plot construction ==
Owing considerable lineage to Get Smart, the plot was always played for laughs and featured Lancelot Link and his female colleague, "Mata Hairi," whose own name in turn was a play on Mata Hari, in secret agent and spy satires. Link and Hairi worked for A.P.E., the Agency to Prevent Evil, in an ongoing conflict with the evil organization C.H.U.M.P., the Criminal Headquarters for Underworld Master Plan (sic).

APE's chief Darwin gave Link and Hairi their orders after explaining his "theory" about each crime-in-progress, a play on the Darwin theory of ape-to-human evolution. CHUMP's monocled chief Baron von Butcher inevitably hatched the latest plan to endanger the world. The Baron's network of international bad guys included his shifty chauffeur Creto, mad scientist Dr. Strangemind, imperious Dragon Woman, drowsy Wang Fu, singing sheikh Ali Assa Seen, and the cultured Duchess. One or more of these bad guys would appear in each episode.

A regular weekly feature, during the intermission between spy stories, was chimpanzee TV host "Ed Simian" (styled as an impersonation of Ed Sullivan of the popular Ed Sullivan Show) introducing a musical number by an all-chimpanzee band, "The Evolution Revolution." The second intermission feature was "Chimpies", a short series of comedy blackouts similar to the "Crazy Shots" gags that writers Stan Burns and Mike Marmer had created for Steve Allen's TV show. The Chimpies repertoire: Freddie and Joe, two chimps in loud suits as burlesque comedians, telling riddles; Monk the Magician, a chimp producing streams of handkerchiefs and other objects from his coat; Herman and Sherman, a chimp and a miniature-chimp ventriloquist dummy; and Sneezes, showing a chimp sneezing and other chimps reacting to it.

== The characters ==
=== A.P.E. ===
- Lancelot Link - (played by Tonga, voiced by Dayton Allen imitating Humphrey Bogart). His surname is a play on 'The Missing Link'.
- Mata Hairi - (played by Debbie, voiced by Joan Gerber). Mata spoke in a high, whiny voice reminiscent of the Dumb Dora comediennes of the 1920s and '30s. Her name was a take-off on Mata Hari.
- Commander Darwin - (voiced by Dayton Allen). Named after Charles Darwin.
- Bruce - Official A.P.E. courier.

=== C.H.U.M.P. ===
- Baron von Butcher - (voiced by Bernie Kopell). Modeled on Kopell's character of "Siegfried" in the television show Get Smart! Kopell is believed to have approached his voicings of the Baron as if Siegfried were the head of KAOS.
- The Dragon Woman - (voiced by Joan Gerber in a precise dialect). Her name was a take-off on the Dragon Lady, a villainess in the Terry and the Pirates comic-strip series.
- Creto - (voiced by Bernie Kopell). His name was basically a play on the word "cretin." Also a play on Kato, the Green Hornet's chauffeur and crime-fighting "sidekick".
- Wang Fu - (voiced by Bernie Kopell). His name was a play on Kung Fu.
- The Duchess - (voiced by Joan Gerber with cultured diction).
- Ali Assa Seen - (voiced and sung by Dayton Allen). His last name was meant to sound like "assassin."
- Dr. Strangemind - (voiced by Dayton Allen impersonating Béla Lugosi). Name inspired by Dr. Strangelove.

=== Additional characters ===
- Ed Simian - (voice: Dayton Allen, imitating Ed Sullivan) TV host who often introduces The Evolution Revolution between spy stories.
- Blackie - The drummer in The Evolution Revolution.
- Freddie and Joe - (voices: Bernie Kopell and Dayton Allen respectively) A burlesque comedy duo who tell riddles in the “Chimpies” segments.
- Unnamed Orangutan - Appeared in cameos as a picturesque extra. Often referred to by Lance as "that weirdo."
- The Bonana Bunch - Three notorious cowboys (all voiced by Dayton Allen) who reside at the Bonana Ranch and occasionally assist C.H.U.M.P. The threesome consists of Pop, Soss and Little Moe (parodies of Ben, Hoss and Little Joe Cartwright from Bonanza).
- Leaping Frog - (voice: Bernie Kopell) A.P.E.’s Native American agent.
- Bart Sparks - (voice: Bernie Kopell) Emcee of the Miss Globe beauty contest (parody of Miss America Pageant host Bert Parks).
- General Drill - (voice: Dayton Allen) Head of A.P.E.’s Intelligence Department’s Top Brass.
- Dr. Marmoset - (voice: Dayton Allen) Baron von Butcher’s dentist and a C.H.U.M.P. henchman.
- Professor Sir Reginald Rhesus - (voice: Dayton Allen) - Noted archaeologist and A.P.E. secret agent.
- Abdul - (voice: Dayton Allen) Professor Sir Reginald Rhesus’ faithful camel driver.
- Dr. Mortimer Link - (voice: Bernie Kopell) British scientist and Lancelot Link’s uncle.
- Ernest Finster - English writer who was captured by C.H.U.M.P.
- The Perfect C.H.U.M.P. - (voice: Bernie Kopell) A human-size chimp-like robot created and programmed by Dr. Strangemind.
- King Romanov - (voice: Bernie Kopell) Monarch of the tiny country of Trivia.
- Parnelli Smith - (voice: Dayton Allen) Auto-racing champion and supplier of cars to A.P.E., his name was a take-off on former Indy 500 champion Parnelli Jones.
- Raquel Wench - (voice: Joan Gerber, imitating Mae West) Screen star making an appearance at the road races. (parody of Raquel Welch).
- Prince Khali - (voice: Dayton Allen) Arabian Prince whose most valued possession and symbol of leadership of his country is the Golden Swwword.
- Herman - C.H.U.M.P. henchman.
- Clarence - (voice: Dayton Allen) A.P.E.’s code courier.
- Monty Mandrill III - (voice: Bernie Kopell) Former songwriter for The Evolution Revolution turned C.H.U.M.P. spy.

== The Evolution Revolution ==
This all-chimp band, dressed in colorful hippie-style wigs and wardrobe, featured Lancelot Link (played by Tonga) on guitar and Mata Hairi (played by Debbie) on tambourine, with Blackie as "Bananas Marmoset" on the drums. "SweetWater Gibbons" (in fringed vest and granny glasses) was credited for playing Farfisa organ, although the organ usually pictured in the clips was a Vox Continental organ.

In the episode "The Evolution Revolution", it was established that the band's music was used to communicate coded messages for A.P.E. agents.

The songs were usually co-written and performed by Steve Hoffman, in the bubblegum pop style then in vogue; Hoffman received "voices" credit along with the various character actors. A Lancelot Link record album was released on ABC Records, as well as a single titled "Sha-La Love You", a song originally intended for The Grass Roots; the music shared some of its style with the music of The Grass Roots, who used the same recording facilities and studio musicians. Steve Barri, who is listed as producer on the album, was the co-creator and long-time producer of The Grass Roots as well.

== Episodes ==
The show's first-season episodes were an hour long, and also included Warner Bros. cartoon shorts from that animation studio's final years. The second season consisted of repeats from the first season with the cartoons removed. The original network broadcast included a laugh track; this was later removed for the syndicated and video releases.

The series consisted of 17 episodes (standard practice at the time for the ABC network, allowing for each episode to be broadcast three times per year). Each episode featured two Lance Link stories, plus a band number and Chimpies sketches.

1. There's No Business Like Snow Business (parts one and two)
2. The Lone A.P.E. / Missile Beach Party
3. The Mysterious Motorcycle Menace / The Great Beauty Contest
4. C.H.U.M.P. Takes A Holiday / To Tell The Tooth
5. The Great Brain Drain / The Great Double Double Cross
6. Lance Of Arabia / The Doctor Goes A.P.E.
7. The Surfin' Spy / The Missing Link
8. Bonana / The Greatest Chase In The World
9. The Reluctant Robot / The Royal Foil
10. The Great Great Race / The Great Plane Plot
11. Landlubber Lance / The Temporary Thanksgiving Turkey Truce
12. The Dreaded Hong Kong Sneeze / The Great Bank Robbery
13. The Sour Taste Of Success / The Baron's Birthday Ball
14. The Golden Swwword / The Chilling C.H.U.M.P. Chase
15. The Spy Who Went Out In The Cold / Too Many C.H.U.M.P.s
16. The C.H.U.M.P. Code Caper / Weather Or Not
17. The Evolution Revolution / The Great Water Robbery

All titles were shown in the Roberta typeface in Scanimation form (except The Great Bank Robbery, where the word "bank" was eventually smash cut out).

== Reception ==
Lancelot Link, Secret Chimp was an immediate success, spawning a wave of related merchandise including a record album, comic books, lunchboxes, and Halloween costumes. Life Magazine featured the series in a photo spread. Gold Key Comics published a Lancelot Link, Secret Chimp comic book series which ran for eight issues from April 1971 to February 1973.

== Syndication ==
Reruns aired for one season on Nickelodeon's Nick at Nite during the late 1980s; the program was also shown on Nick at Nite’s TV Land for a brief time in 1999 as part of their "Super Retrovision Saturdaze" Saturday morning-oriented overnight prime programming block. The Comedy Channel (now Comedy Central) aired reruns of this as well as Gerry Anderson stop-motion series Dick Spanner, P.I. in a block hosted by detective-themed stand-up comedian Tommy Sledge.

== Home media ==
In June 2006, most of the episodes were released on a 2-DVD set by Image Entertainment.

On May 29, 2012, SBM Productions and Film Chest released the complete series on a 3-disc collector's edition. The Chimpies skits and Evolution Revolution music videos were included as separate items as well as inside the various episodes. The documentary I Created Lancelot Link was included in the bonus features, along with an interview with the original producer Allan Sandler, an interview with music composer Bob Emenegger, and a visit with Tonga, the chimp who played Lancelot in the series.

=== Documentary ===
A 1999 documentary short, I Created Lancelot Link, was made by Diane Bernard and Jeff Krulik; it includes a reunion between the show's two creators and was "shot in shlocky Hi-8 video, and [featuring] an entertaining juxtaposition of anecdotes from Burns and Marmer and some of the show's finest moments."

=== Print media ===
The fanzine Lancelot Link Fan World was published in 1975 by Cornell Kimball. Additional subjects included Sealab 2020.
