= Tom Johnson (television writer) =

American television writer (1968–2024)

- Born: Thomas Martin Johnson; July 25, 1968; Fairfax, Virginia, U.S.
- Died: January 14, 2024 (aged 55); Los Angeles, California, U.S.
- Occupation: Television writer
- Spouse: Rozie Bacchi

Thomas Martin Johnson (July 25, 1968 – January 14, 2024) was an American television writer. He won two Primetime Emmy Awards and was nominated for one more in the category Outstanding Writing For A Variety, Music Or Comedy Program.

Johnson died on January 14, 2024, at the age of 55.
