= Jason Ross (writer) =

American screenwriter

- Education: University of California, Santa Barbara
- Occupation: Writer
- Years active: 1993–
- Notable work: The Amazing Beef Squad: Never Say Die!
- Style: Comedic
- Television: The Tonight Show Starring Jimmy Fallon; The Daily Show; The President Show "Any Given Wednesday with Bill Simmons"
- Spouse: Nicole Revere
- Children: 2
- Website: https://jasonross.net

Jason Ross is an American writer and seven-time Primetime Emmy Award for Outstanding Writing for a Variety Series winner.

== Early life and education ==
Ross grew up in Chico, California, in the 1970s and 80s and graduated from Chico Senior High School in 1988. He attended the University of California, Santa Barbara, where he was a 1993 Collegiate Gold Circle Awards winner for his work at Daily Nexus. He served as the news editor at Daily Nexus before being promoted to editor-in-chief and graduated from UCSB in 1993.

== Career ==
=== Journalism ===
Ross followed a journalism career and was a writer for his hometown Chico News & Review after college.

=== The Daily Show ===
Ross joined The Daily Show in 2002, where he ended up spending 11 years, finally departing in June 2013. As a staff writer, he was awarded seven Emmy Awards and a Writers Guild Award.

He also helped to write the show's two best-selling books, America and Earth.

=== Late Night with Jimmy Fallon ===
Ross joined Late Night with Jimmy Fallon for the 2013–14 television season.

=== Any Given Wednesday with Bill Simmons ===
Ross held the role of head writer on Any Given Wednesday with Bill Simmons in 2016.

=== The President Show ===
Ross served as executive producer and writer of The President Show in 2017, helping write and produce the first 15 episodes. The show received a nomination for the 70th Writers Guild of America Awards. He returned in 2018 to write and produce two President Show specials.

=== The Amazing Beef Squad: Never Say Die! ===
In 2021, Delacorte published Ross's middle grade novel, The Amazing Beef Squad: Never Say Die!, a comic adventure set in a fictional California town. Kirkus praised its "comical pratfalls aplenty on the way to a triumphant close." Jon Stewart noted, "Juvenile delinquency has never been so fun!" In spite of this—or perhaps because of it—the School Library Journal did not recommend the book for purchase.

=== STOP THE DIS! ===
In 2024, Ross joined his fellow Daily Show alum Al Madrigal to write and produce STOP THE DIS!, a series of digital monologues calling attention to disinformation in Latino social media. The series took a Telly Award for public interest and awareness.

== Awards ==
Ross and the Daily Show writing team received the Primetime Emmy Award for Outstanding Writing for a Variety, Music, or Comedy Program in 2003, 2004, 2005, 2006, 2009, 2011, and 2012. In 2010, they won the Writers Guild Award in their category. Ross and The Daily Show staff received a Peabody Award for "Indecision 2004"List of Peabody Award winners (2000–2009), covering the 2004 presidential election, and another in 2016 marking Stewart's tenure at the show.

== Personal life ==
Ross lives in Los Angeles, California. He is married to Nicole Revere and has two grown children.
