= Peter Gwinn =

American comedian

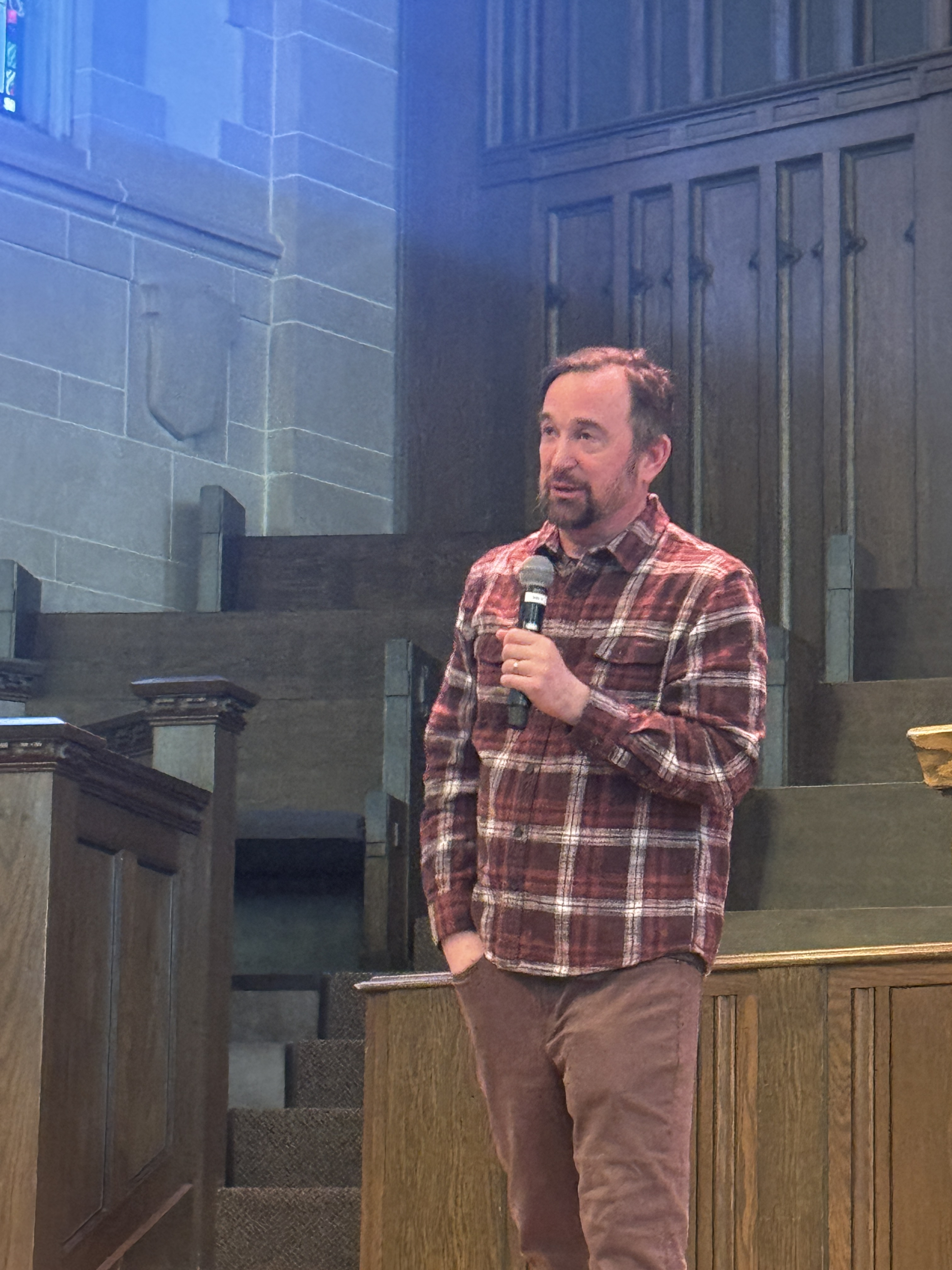
- Gwinn at Carleton College Convocation 2026
- Born: January 26, 1971 (age 55); Evanston, Illinois, U.S.
- Education: Carleton College (BA)
- Occupations: Comedy writer; Playwright; Improviser
- Years active: 1993–present
- Known for: Colbert Report; Wait Wait Don't Tell Me; Twist Your Dickens

Peter Gwinn is an American comedy writer, improviser, and playwright known for his work on The Colbert Report and NPR's Wait Wait... Don't Tell Me!. He co-wrote the stage comedy Twist Your Dickens with Bobby Mort and wrote the holiday musical Moulin Scrooge.

== Career ==
=== The Colbert Report ===
In 2005, Comedy Central invited Gwinn to audition for a writing position on The Colbert Report. His audition material included a satirical proposal that cyclist Lance Armstrong be retired “to stud” like a racehorse. Gwinn was subsequently hired as a writer before the program premiered in October 2005.

Gwinn and fellow writer Laura Krafft had previously worked in Chicago improvisational theater. They were among several members of the program's original writing staff who had studied or performed at Chicago improv institutions, including The Second City and iO Theater.

=== Other television work ===
Gwinn later wrote for Alpha House, an Amazon political comedy created by Garry Trudeau about four Republican United States senators who share a house in Washington, D.C. He was also credited as a consulting producer on eight episodes of the series.

Gwinn later wrote for NPR's comedy news quiz Wait Wait Don't Tell Me.

=== Theater and writing ===
In Chicago improv, he co-founded the musical improv group Baby Wants Candy, a troupe that creates an entirely improvised musical from an audience-supplied title. It became an international touring production, had repeated sold-out Edinburgh Fringe runs, and was recognized as a New York Times critics’ pick. He also helped found the Home Comedy Theater.

Gwinn co-wrote the stage comedy Twist Your Dickens, a comic adaptation of A Christmas Carol, with Bobby Mort. The production was staged at Chicago's Goodman Theatre.

He also wrote the holiday stage musical Moulin Scrooge, a mash-up of A Christmas Carol and Moulin Rouge, and appeared in the production.

Gwinn was a member of The Second City Touring Company from 1997 to 2000. He also performed and taught at the iO Theater in Chicago and later performed and taught at the Upright Citizens Brigade Theatre in New York and Los Angeles.

=== Book ===
In 2003, Gwinn published Group Improvisation: The Manual of Ensemble Improv Games through Meriwether Publishing. The book presents more than 40 games and exercises intended to develop communication and cooperation within improvisational ensembles. Its sections address skills including bonding, focus, awareness, creation, energy and group dynamics.

A second edition was published by Meriwether Publishing in 2007.

== Education ==
Gwinn attended Carleton College, where he participated in the student improv group Cujokra.

== Awards ==
Television Academy lists Gwinn as having received seven * Primetime Emmy nominations for his work on “The Colbert Report”, including two wins in 2008 and 2010 for Outstanding Writing for a Variety, Music or Comedy Program or Series. During his tenure, the program also received a Peabody Award for its satirical journalism.
