= Mike Marmer =

American screenwriter

- Born: Merrill Donald Marmer; September 25, 1925; Lowell, Massachusetts, U.S.
- Died: January 12, 2002 (aged 76); Los Angeles, California, U.S.
- Education: Suffolk University
- Occupation: Screenwriter
- Children: 2

Merrill Donald Marmer (September 25, 1925 – January 12, 2002) was an American screenwriter.

Marmer was born in Lowell, Massachusetts, the son of Lewis R. Marmer (1903–1977) and Gertrude E. Marmer (née Kotell, 1903–1961). During World War II he served with the U.S. Marine Corps on Okinawa. After his discharge he attended Suffolk University on the G.I. Bill. While at university he acted in student productions before deciding to become a writer.

Often working with Stan Burns, Marmer wrote for television programs including Get Smart, The Carol Burnett Show, Three's Company, Gilligan's Island, The Smothers Brothers Comedy Hour, and the early 1970s children's show Lancelot Link, Secret Chimp. He also wrote material for comedians such as Steve Allen, Milton Berle, Dean Martin, Bob Newhart, and Flip Wilson.

Marmer won a Primetime Emmy Award in the category Outstanding Writing for a Variety Series for his work on The Carol Burnett Show, and was nominated for four more for The Ernie Kovacs Show, The Carol Burnett Show and The Flip Wilson Show. Marmer died in January 2002 of cancer in Los Angeles, California, at the age of 76.
