= Andrew Weinberg =

American television writer (born 1976)

- Born: 1976 (age 49–50)
- Education: Cornell University
- Occupation: Television writer

Andrew Weinberg (born 1976) is an American television writer, known for his work on Late Night with Conan O'Brien and The Tonight Show with Conan O'Brien. He is also a co-creator and co-writer of the television series Eagleheart. The quarter-hour series is a parody of action crime dramas like Walker, Texas Ranger and originated in Conan O'Brien's Conaco Prods. He also executive produced the show Jury Duty on Amazon Freevee.

Weinberg received his bachelor's degree from Cornell University in 1998. At Cornell he joined the Phi Kappa Psi fraternity and through that organization, the Irving Literary Society.

Weinberg and his fellow writers for Late Night with Conan O'Brien were awarded the Emmy Award in 2007, and were nominees in 2001, 2002, 2003, 2004, 2005, 2006, 2008 and 2009. In 2006, they were awarded the Writers Guild of America Award. On Late Night with Conan O'Brien, Weinberg plays character Shoeverine, Heavy Hands Harry, among others.
