= Raymond Siller =

American screenwriter

Raymond Siller (born April 8, 1939) is an American television writer and political consultant. He was nominated for four Emmy Awards as long-time head writer on The Tonight Show Starring Johnny Carson. He has written for four U.S. presidents and contributed articles to The New York Times, The Wall Street Journal, The Washington Times and USA Today. He lives in New York City.

== Early ==
Siller was born and raised in the Bay Ridge section of Brooklyn, New York. He attended Brooklyn Prep and Fordham University, wrote for the student newspaper, The Fordham Ram, and was a chief announcer on Fordham's FM station, WFUV. He earned a Bachelor of Arts degree in 1960.

== Career ==
His professional career began in New York as an ABC Television Network page, and he was later employed as a radio director at ABC's flagship rock station, WABC. He subsequently gained a staff director position at the ABC Radio Network, working with Charles Osgood, Ted Koppel, Peter Jennings, and Howard Cosell.

Siller moved over to ABC-TV in 1968 as an associate director on The Dick Cavett Show where he transitioned to Cavett's writing staff.

During the 1970 congressional elections, President Richard M. Nixon invited Siller to be a consultant at the White House. He assumed that post and at the same time consulted for Vice President Spiro Agnew. On the wedding day of Nixon's daughter, Tricia, attended by both Agnew and comedian Bob Hope, Agnew appeared in Los Angeles at an Army Ball honoring Hope. In his introduction to Hope, Agnew peppered his speech with many of Siller's one-liners. They included jokes about the wedding. Hope, following Agnew on the dais, had to cross out from his own monologue the topical references that Agnew had just delivered. Hope asked his nephew, Peter Malatesta, at the time Agnew's aide, “Who the hell wrote those jokes?” When Malatesta informed him it was Ray Siller, Hope said, “Tell him he’s hired”.

The following year, Siller relocated to California to begin a three-year stint at NBC Burbank on Hope's writing staff for The Bob Hope Specials. In 1972, he accompanied Hope on his final Christmas tour to Vietnam.

In 1974, Siller left Hope to write for another NBC program, The Tonight Show Starring Johnny Carson. He remained with Carson for fifteen years, the last twelve of those as Carson's head writer.

Siller has consulted for four presidents: Richard M Nixon, Ronald Reagan, George H. W. Bush, and George W. Bush. This included writing Gridiron, Alfalfa Club, Radio-TV Correspondents, White House Correspondents, and Al Smith dinners. He contributed material for campaigns and televised debates. He has written for Vice President Agnew, 1996 Presidential nominee, Senator Bob Dole, and California Governor George Deukmejian. He consulted for New York Governor, and later Vice President, Nelson Rockefeller.

== Television credits ==
- the Dick Cavett Show
- Bob Hope Specials
- The Tonight Show Starring Johnny Carson
- Laverne and Shirley
- Welcome Back, Kotter

== Emmy nominations ==
- 1980-81: head writer, The Tonight Show Starring Johnny Carson (Outstanding Writing for a Variety, Music or Comedy Program)
- 1985-86: head writer, The Tonight Show Starring Johnny Carson (Outstanding Writing for a Variety or Music Program)
- 1987: head writer, The Tonight Show Starring Johnny Carson (Outstanding Writing for a Variety or Music Program)
- 1988: head writer, The Tonight Show Starring Johnny Carson (Outstanding Writing for a Variety or Music Program)

== Honors ==
1977-78: Academy of Television Arts and Sciences honors Ray Siller, Head Writer, for contributions to the Emmy Award-winning program, The Tonight Show Starring Johnny Carson. Special Classification of Outstanding Program Achievement.

1972: The Department of Defense Certificate of Esteem for Patriotic Service in providing Entertainment to Members of the Armed Forces in the Pacific.

1972: Eighth Air Force Certificate of Appreciation In Special Recognition for the Outstanding Contribution to the Morale and Holiday Spirit of Military Personnel at Andersen Air Force Base, Guam as a Member of The 1972 Bob Hope Christmas Show.

1968-1969 The National Academy of Television Arts and Sciences Honors Raymond Siller for contributions to the Television Academy Award-winning program "The Dick Cavett Show" Chosen for Outstanding Achievement In Daytime Programming.
