= Bill Scheft =

American novelist

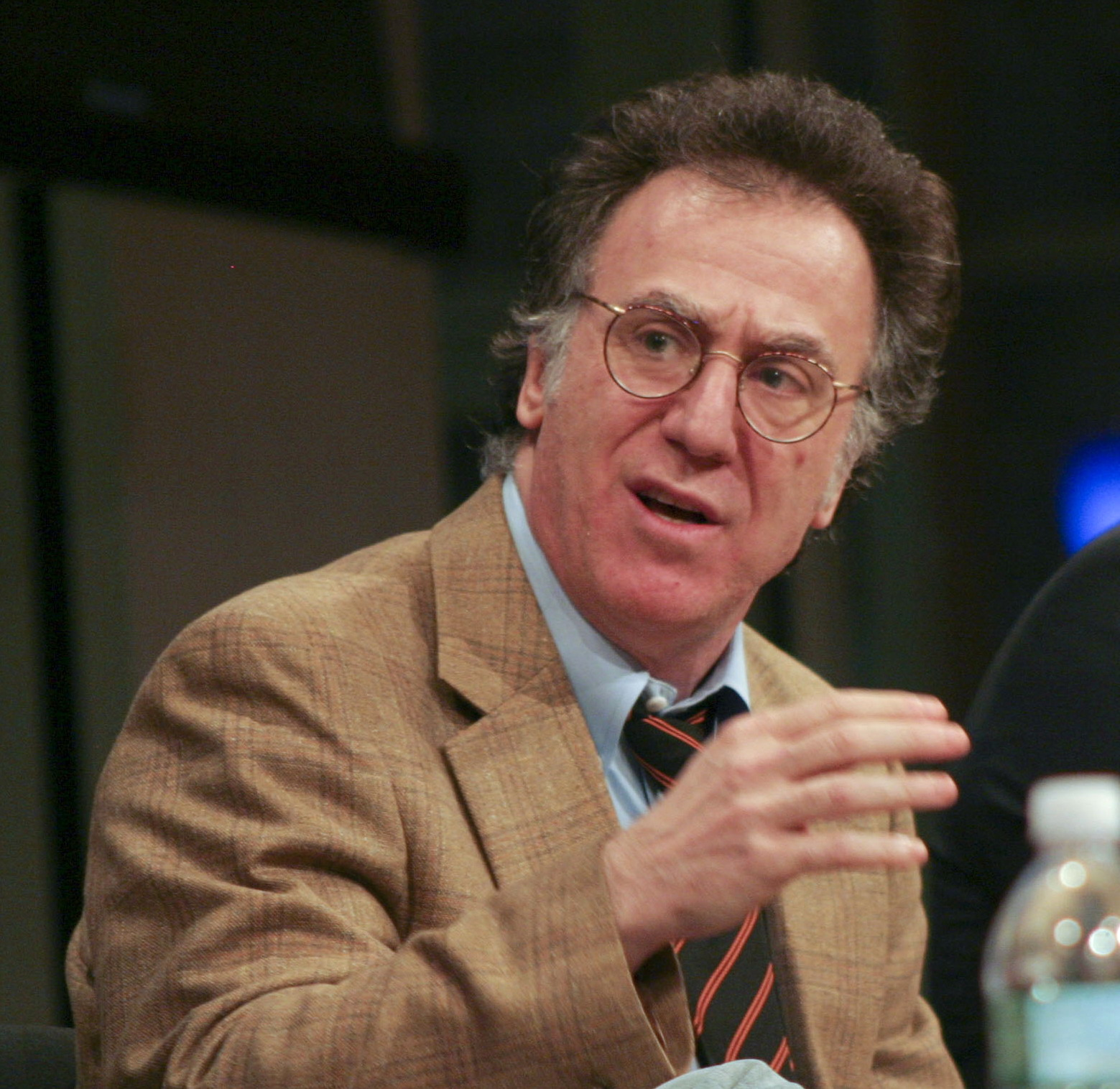
- Scheft at the 2009 New York Television Festival alongside Tom Ruprecht and Matt Roberts (a writer and the head writer of The David Letterman Show, both are cropped out of the photo
- Born: February 15, 1957 (age 69); Boston, Massachusetts, U.S.
- Writing career
- Language: English
- Genres: Comedy; fiction

Bill Scheft (born February 15, 1957 in Boston) is an American comedy writer and novelist. He is best known for being a staff writer for David Letterman from 1991 to 2015. During that time he was nominated for 15 Emmy Awards. He ran a weekly humor column, "The Show", in Sports Illustrated from 2002 to 2005. A collection of his columns, The Best of "The Show", was published by Warner Books in 2005.

Scheft is the author of five novels: The Ringer (2002), Time Won't Let Me (2005), Everything Hurts (2009), Shrink Thyself (2014), and Tommy Dash: Was It Everything I Said? (2022). Time Won't Let Me was a finalist for the 2006 Thurber Prize for American Humor. Both The Ringer and Everything Hurts are optioned for film.

Scheft has contributed humor essays to The New Yorker, Salon, and Air Mail. He is the nephew of the late Herbert Warren Wind, the legendary golf and profile writer for The New Yorker and Sports Illustrated. In 2011, Scheft co-edited and wrote a foreword for the collection, America's Gift to Golf: Herbert Warren Wind on The Masters. He graduated from Harvard College in Cambridge, Massachusetts in 1979 with honors. He was married to comedian Adrianne Tolsch for 26 years before her death on December 7, 2016.
