= Dina Gusovsky =

American journalist and writer

- Born: Dina Gusovsky
- Occupations: Journalist, comedy writer
- Notable credit: CNBC
- Website: www.dinagusovsky.com

Dina Gusovsky is an American journalist and writer for Late Night with Seth Meyers. She has worked previously for CNBC, Bloomberg News and CNN. In 2015 Gusovsky received an award for Excellence in Television at the 2015 Walter Cronkite Awards.

Gusovsky received political asylum in the United States in 1991, leaving Russia to avoid rampant discrimination against Jewish people.
