= Fred Graver =

American novelist

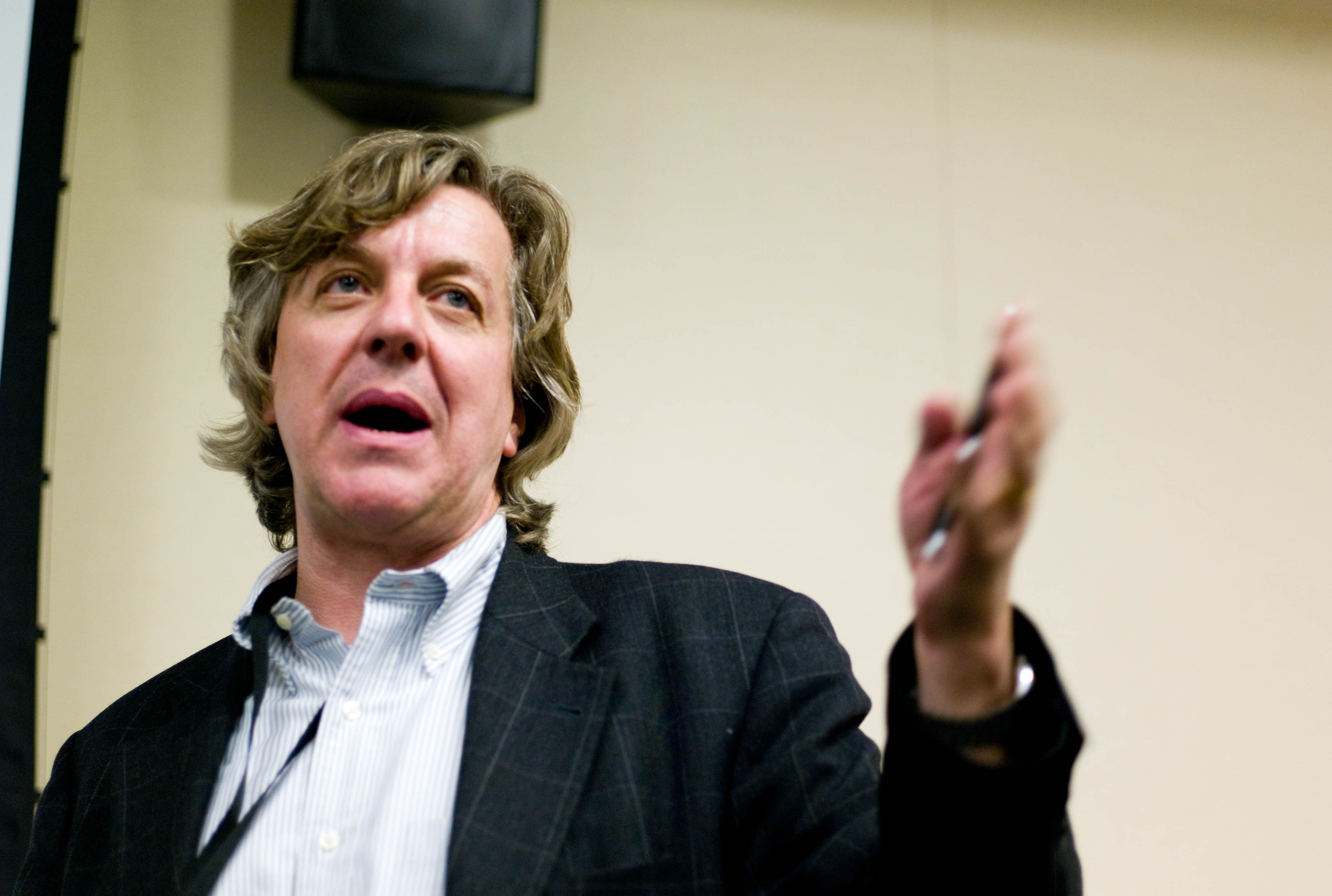
Fred Graver

Fred Graver is an American television comedy writer, producer, and network executive. Most recently he's been the Creative Lead, TV @Twitter and Senior Vice President, Digital & Social for Discovery Communications.

Fred was co-editor-in-chief of National Lampoon, along with Sean Kelly, under the pseudonym L. Dennis Plunkett. He left the Lampoon in 1984 to join Late Night with David Letterman, where he worked as a writer until 1990. While at Letterman, he wrote several unproduced screenplays with Kevin Curran (who also edited National Lampoon).

In 1990, Graver worked for Norman Lear's production company Tandem Productions. He left a year later to join the staff of In Living Color, where he worked until 1992, when he joined the staff of Cheers as a writer and eventual co-producer.

In 1994, the Northridge earthquake convinced Graver and good friend Charlie Rubin to return to New York, where the two wrote for The Jon Stewart Show.

In 1996, Graver leapt into the internet as executive producer of convergence programming Disney and ABC Cable, which was spearheaded by cable executive Geraldine Laybourne and known as ABZ. In 1999, he began work as an executive at MTV Networks and VH1, where he joined their MTV Networks Online division as head of VH1.com and Sonicnet.com He then went into television programming as the head of VH1, and created the show Best Week Ever. In 2010, Fred was named SVP of Programming for the Travel Channel. In 2012, Graver joined Twitter as Creative Director of Media Partnerships.
