= Rebecca Drysdale =

American comedian and writer

- Born: 1978 or 1979; Ohio, U.S.
- Occupations: Comedian and Writer

Rebecca Drysdale (born 1978 or 1979 in Ohio) is an American comedian and writer who was a member of the Second City Chicago E.T.C. cast. She won the 2005 Breakout Performer Award at the 2005 United States Comedy Arts Festival. She performed as part of the multi-arts group performance Synesthesia. She has written for sketch comedy shows such as The Big Gay Sketch Show and Key & Peele. In 2011, she made a video for the It Gets Better Project.

== Personal life ==
Drysdale currently lives in Los Angeles; she is openly lesbian. She is the younger sister of comedy writer Eric Drysdale.

== Filmography ==
Year	Title	Role	Notes
2014	Kroll Show	Patty	TV
2014	Orange is the New Black	Mazall	TV
2016	Me Him Her	Kris	
2016	The Meddler	Dani	
2018	Arrested Development	Lieutenant Toddler	TV
2020	Scare Me	Bettina	
