= John Thibodeaux =

American actor and writer

John Thibodeaux is an American actor and writer for CBS's The Late Show with Stephen Colbert. He also plays Jim Anchorton, a fictional character created for "Real News Tonight", a recurring segment on Late Show. He has been nominated for a Primetime Emmy Award for Outstanding Writing - Variety Series. Before he was hired as a writer, he was a member of The Second City Touring Company.
