= Eric Drysdale =

American comedy writer (born 1969)

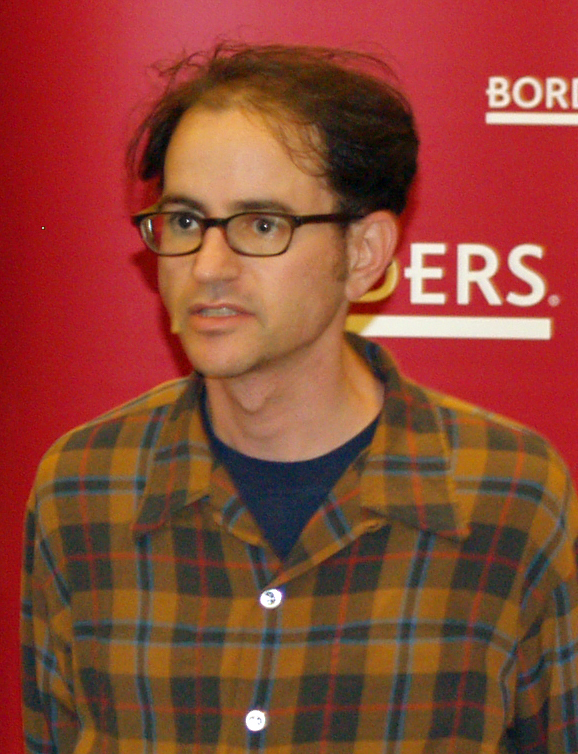
Eric Drysdale

Eric Drysdale (born March 20, 1969) is an American writer for The Colbert Report, The Daily Show, The Late Show with Stephen Colbert, and Full Frontal with Samantha Bee. He has been nominated for twenty-one Emmys and won ten. In addition to TV writing, Drysdale has written and produced live shows at the Upright Citizens Brigade Theatre, and also performs stand-up.

== Career ==
=== The Daily Show with Jon Stewart ===
Drysdale worked as a writer and occasional on-screen actor for The Daily Show for six years, during which time he contributed to their coverage of the 2000 and 2004 elections. While there, he won five Emmy awards, two Peabody Awards, two Television Critics Association Awards, and an ASIFA animation award. He did collaborative work on America (The Book), in which he drew a facsimile of the "bill" from the Schoolhouse Rock! series. The caption added that he was never compensated for the drawing.

=== The Colbert Report ===
From 2005 to 2008, Drysdale worked as a writer on The Colbert Report, appearing sometimes on-screen as Bobby, Stephen Colbert's besieged stage manager. His last appearance on the show was the April 21, 2008 episode, in which his character Bobby was eaten by Stephen. He was also involved in writing the 2007 book, I Am America (And So Can You!). Drysdale returned to the writing staff of the show on October 26, 2009.

=== Music ===
For five years from 2000, Eric was a part-time member of the band Tammy Faye Starlite and the Angels of Mercy, performing satirical country-rock. He co-wrote and performed two songs on Tammy's second album, Used Country Female. He performed with Willie Nelson on The Colbert Report.

His best-known song, "This Rubik's Cube is Driving Me Crazy" was performed on an episode of Comedy Centrals Premium Blend in 2000.

=== Other work ===
Drysdale has written and produced three full-length live shows at New York's Upright Citizens Brigade theater: The Drysdales Present: A Comedy Show (2001), The Daryl Hall and John Oates Mumbo Jumbo Hour (2003), and The Chipperton Family Vocaltainers' Shooby-Dooby-Dooby Hour (2004). The latter was an official selection at the 2005 HBO U.S. Comedy Arts Festival in Aspen, Colorado.

Other works of Drysdale include Production Consultant for the TV show Night of Too Many Stars.

He performs stand-up, presents movies, and performs monologues at venues throughout New York City, and has performed on Comedy Central's Premium Blend and NBC's Late Friday, as well as at the Montreal Comedy Festival, the Chicago Improv Festival, and Seattle's Bumbershoot festival. He also contributed material to three all-star benefits for autism education organized by Robert Smigel.

== Personal life ==
Drysdale lives in New York City with his wife and dog. He is the brother of actress and comedian Rebecca Drysdale
