= Laura Krafft =

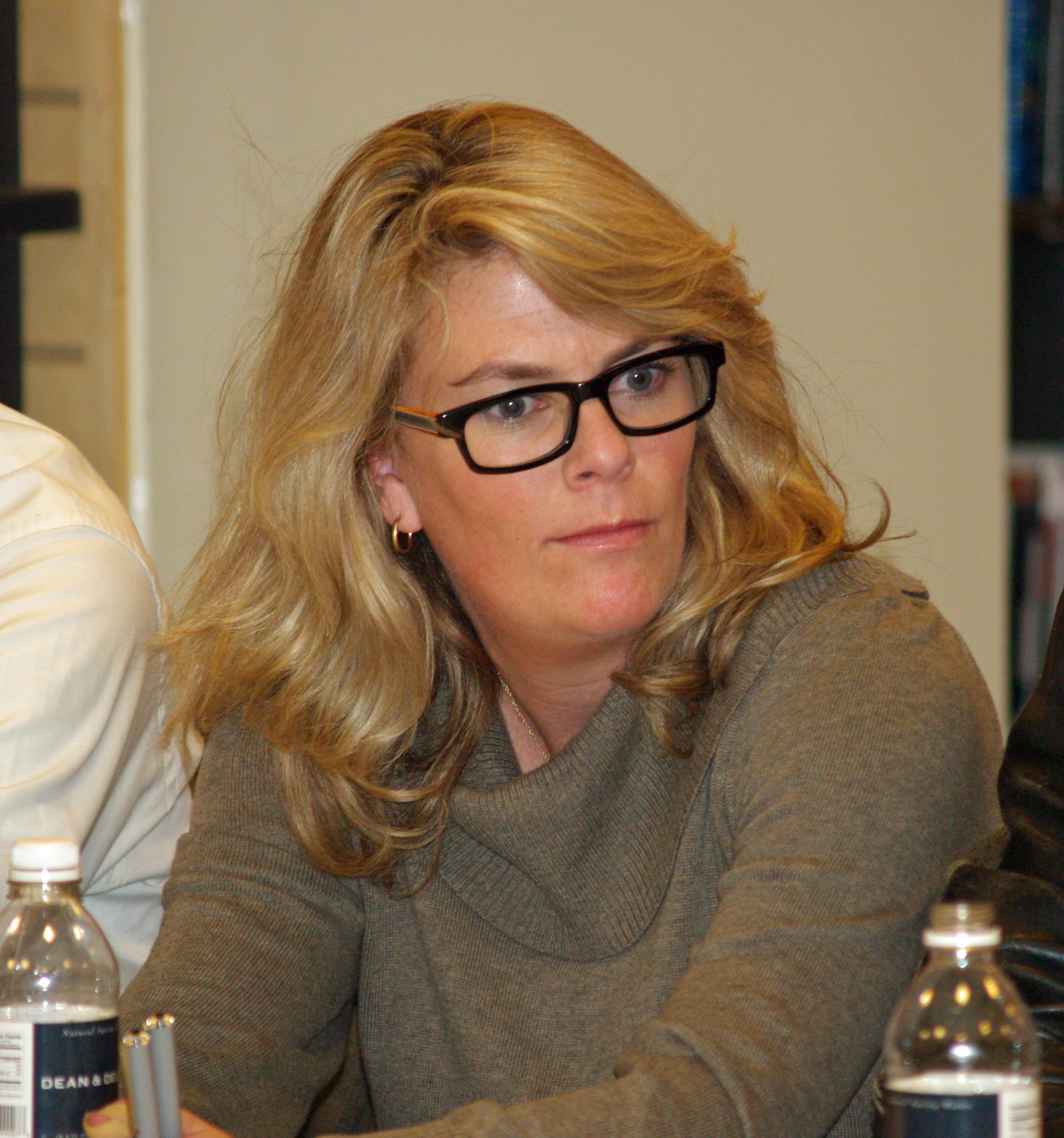
- Laura Krafft
- Education: The Second City, ImprovOlympic
- Occupations: Comedic writer, Actress
- Years active: 2000s–present
- Known for: The Colbert Report, Call Me Kat, Grimsburg

Laura Krafft is a comedic writer and actress. An ImprovOlympic and Second City alum, she is a former staff writer for The Colbert Report.

== Writing assignments ==
- Grimsburg (2024)
- Call Me Kat (2021)
- The Colbert Report (2006-2008)

Bust Magazine Columnist, "News from a Broad", (2006, present)

- Crossballs: The Debate Show (2004)

== Vocal work ==
- Bateman 365
- Dante's Inferno
- WireTap
- Mystery Show Case #1 Video Store

== Appearances ==
- Curb Your Enthusiasm
- Weekends at the D.L.
