= Stan Burns =

American screenwriter

- Born: September 4, 1923; Brooklyn, New York, U.S.
- Died: November 5, 2002 (aged 79); Woodland Hills, California, U.S.
- Occupation: Screenwriter
- Spouse: Shirley Burns
- Children: 2

Stan Burns (September 4, 1923 - November 5, 2002) was an American screenwriter. He was the partner of Mike Marmer. Burns wrote for television programs including The Steve Allen Show, The Tonight Show, Get Smart, The Carol Burnett Show, F Troop, Gilligan's Island and The Smothers Brothers Comedy Hour.

Burns won and was nominated for five Primetime Emmy Awards between 1959 and 1973, winning in 1972 for work on The Carol Burnett Show. He died in November 2002 of heart failure at the Motion Picture & Television Fund cottages in Woodland Hills, California, at the age of 79.
