= List of awards and nominations received by The Daily Show =

List of accolades received by The Daily Show
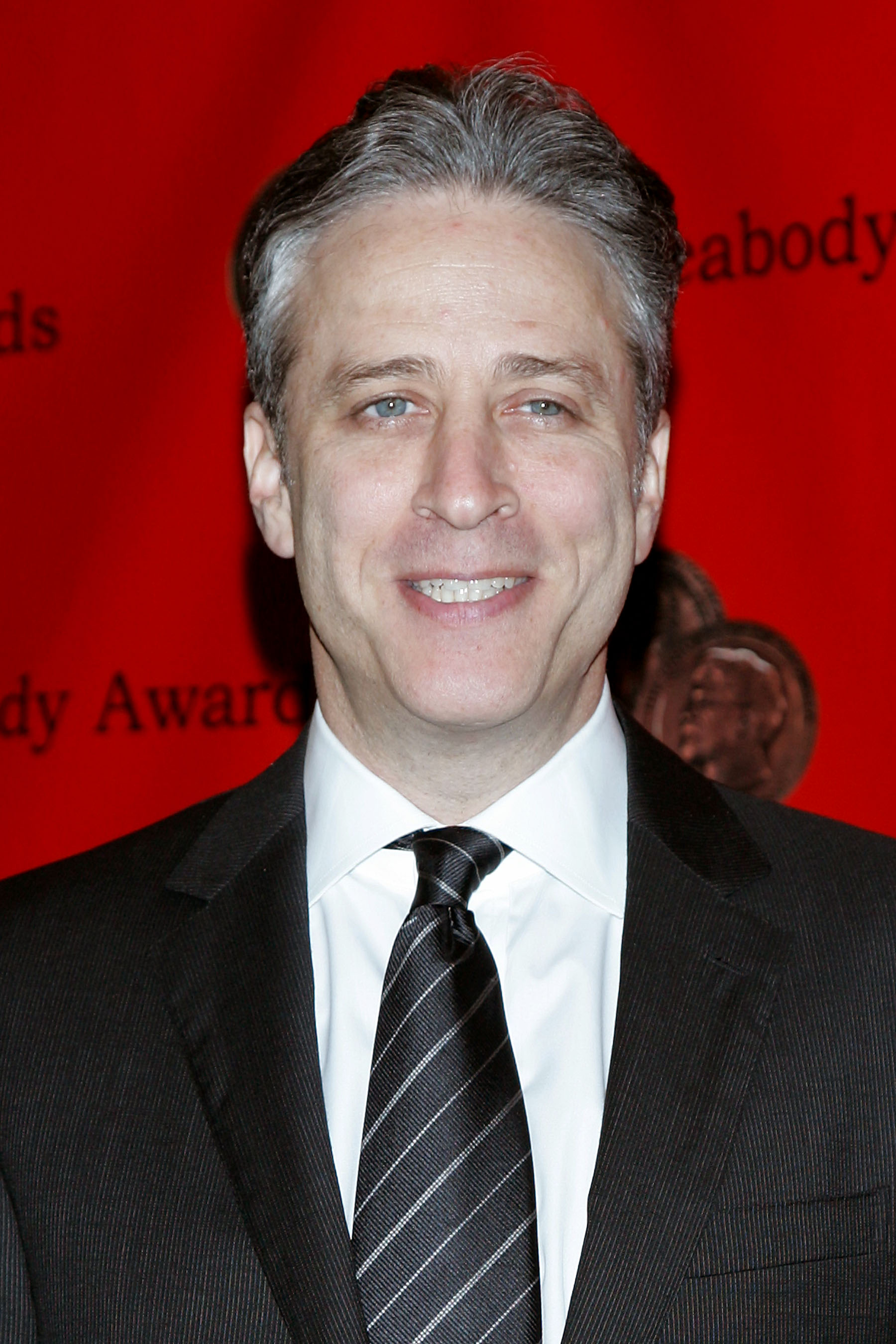
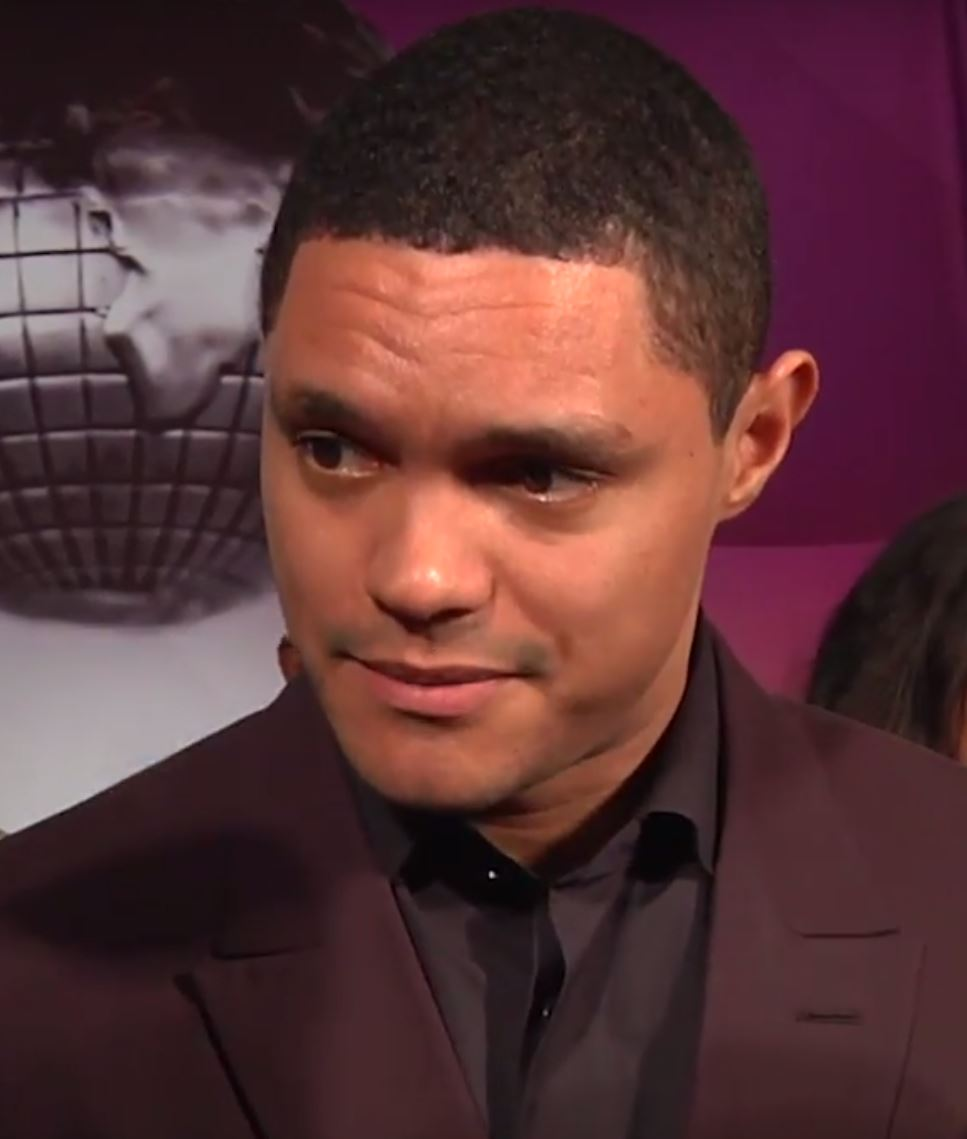
- Jon Stewart (left) and Trevor Noah (right) have received several awards and nominations for their tenure as hosts.
Awards and nominations
Award	Wins	Nominations
American Comedy Awards	1	2
ASTRA Awards	0	2
British Academy Television Awards	0	1
CableACE Awards	0	1
Canadian Comedy Awards	1	1
Critics' Choice Television Awards	3	7
The Comedy Awards	2	2
Directors Guild of America Awards	0	11
Dorian Awards	2	5
Emmy Awards	24	64
Genesis Awards	0	1
GLAAD Media Awards	2	4
Grammy Awards	2	2
MTV Movie & TV Awards	1	1
NAACP Image Awards	0	5
Peabody Awards	3	3
People's Choice Awards	0	3
Satellite Awards	1	1
Teen Choice Awards	0	2
Television Critics Association Awards	4	24
Writers Guild of America Awards	1	11

Totals (Note: Certain award groups do not simply award one winner. They acknowledge several different recipients, have runners-up, and have third place. Since this is a specific recognition and is different from losing an award, runner-up mentions are considered wins in this award tally. For simplification and to avoid errors, each award in this list has been presumed to have had a prior nomination.)
- Wins: 47
- Nominations: 154

This is a list of the awards won by the satirical news program The Daily Show.

== British Academy Television Awards ==
The British Academy Television Awards is an annual award show presented by the British Academy of Film and Television Arts. The awards were founded in 1947 as The British Film Academy, by David Lean, Alexander Korda, Carol Reed, Charles Laughton, Roger Manvell and others.

List of British Academy Television Awards and nominations received by The Daily Show
Year	Category	Nominee(s)	Result	Ref.
2009	Best International Programme	Jon Stewart, Chuck O'Neil, Rich Blomquist, Scott Jacobson	Nominated	

== Critics' Choice Television Awards ==
The Critics' Choice Television Awards is an annual accolade bestowed by the Broadcast Television Journalists Association in recognition of outstanding achievements in television, since 2011. The Daily Show has won three awards from a total of seven nominations.

List of Critics' Choice Television Awards and nominations received by The Daily Show
Year	Category	Result	Ref.
2011	Best Talk Show	Won	
2012	Best Talk Show	Nominated	
2013	Best Talk Show	Won	
2014	Best Talk Show	Nominated	
2015	Best Talk Show	Won	
2016	Best Talk Show	Nominated	
2016	Best Talk Show	Nominated	

== Directors Guild of America Awards ==
The Directors Guild of America Award is an annual accolade bestowed by the Directors Guild of America in recognition of outstanding achievements in film and television directing, since 1938. The Daily Show has been nominated for eleven awards.

List of Directors Guild of America Awards and nominations received by The Daily Show
Year	Category	Nominee(s)	Episode	Result	Ref.
2004	Outstanding Directing – Musical Variety	Chuck O'Neil		Nominated	
2005	Outstanding Directing – Musical Variety	Chuck O'Neil		Nominated	
2006	Outstanding Directing – Musical Variety	Chuck O'Neil		Nominated	
2007	Outstanding Directing – Musical Variety	Chuck O'Neil		Nominated	
2008	Outstanding Directing – Musical Variety	Chuck O'Neil		Nominated	
2009	Outstanding Directing – Musical Variety	Chuck O'Neil	#13107	Nominated	
2012	Outstanding Directing – Musical Variety	Chuck O'Neil	#16070	Nominated	
2013	Outstanding Directing – Musical Variety	Chuck O'Neil	#17153	Nominated	
2014	Outstanding Directing – Variety/Talk/News/Sports – Regularly Scheduled	Chuck O'Neil	#19018	Nominated	
2015	Outstanding Directing – Variety/Talk/News/Sports – Regularly Scheduled	Chuck O'Neil	"Open Carrying to the Midterms"	Nominated	
2016	Outstanding Directing – Variety/Talk/News/Sports – Regularly Scheduled	Chuck O'Neil	#20142	Nominated	

== Emmy Awards ==
Awarded since 1949, the Primetime Emmy Award is an annual accolade bestowed by members of the Academy of Television Arts & Sciences recognizing outstanding achievements in American prime time television programming. Awards presented for more technical and production-based categories (like art direction, casting, and editing) are designated "Creative Arts Emmy Awards." The Daily Show has won twenty-four awards from a total of sixty-four nominations.

=== Primetime Emmy Awards ===
List of Primetime Emmy Awards and nominations received by The Daily Show
Year	Category	Nominee(s)	Result
2001	Outstanding Variety, Music or Comedy Series	Jon Stewart, Kahane Corn, Madeleine Smithberg	Nominated
2001	Outstanding Writing for a Variety, Music or Comedy Program	Eric Drysdale, Jim Earl, Daniel J. Goor, Charlie Grandy, J. R. Havlan, Tom Johnson, Kent Jones, Paul Mecurio, Chris Regan, Allison Silverman, Jon Stewart	Won
2002	Outstanding Variety, Music or Comedy Series	Jon Stewart, Stewart Bailey, Kahane Corn, Ben Karlin, Madeleine Smithberg	Nominated
2002	Outstanding Writing for a Variety, Music or Comedy Program	Aaron Bergeron, Jonathan Bines, Eric Drysdale, J. R. Havlan, David Javerbaum, Tom Johnson, Ben Karlin, Paul Mecurio, Chris Regan, Jason Reich, Jon Stewart	Nominated
2002	Outstanding Individual Performance in a Variety or Music Program	Jon Stewart	Nominated
2003	Outstanding Variety, Music or Comedy Series	Jon Stewart, Stewart Bailey, Kahane Corn, Ben Karlin, Madeleine Smithberg	Won
2003	Outstanding Writing for a Variety, Music or Comedy Program	Rich Blomquist, Steve Bodow, Eric Drysdale, J. R. Havlan, Scott Jacobson, David Javerbaum, Tom Johnson, Ben Karlin, Rob Kutner, Chris Regan, Jason Reich, Jason Ross, Jon Stewart	Won
2003	Outstanding Individual Performance in a Variety or Music Program	Jon Stewart	Nominated
2004	Outstanding Variety, Music or Comedy Series	Jon Stewart, Stewart Bailey, Kahane Corn, David Javerbaum, Ben Karlin	Won
2004	Outstanding Writing for a Variety, Music or Comedy Program	Rich Blomquist, Steve Bodow, Tim Carvell, Stephen Colbert, Eric Drysdale, J. R. Havlan, Scott Jacobson, David Javerbaum, Ben Karlin, Chris Regan, Jason Reich, Jason Ross, Jon Stewart	Won
2005	Outstanding Variety, Music or Comedy Series	Jon Stewart, Stewart Bailey, Kahane Corn, David Javerbaum, Ben Karlin	Won
2005	Outstanding Writing for a Variety, Music or Comedy Program	Rich Blomquist, Steve Bodow, Tim Carvell, Stephen Colbert, Eric Drysdale, J. R. Havlan, Scott Jacobson, David Javerbaum, Ben Karlin, Rob Kutner, Chris Regan, Jason Reich, Jason Ross, Jon Stewart	Won
2005	Outstanding Individual Performance in a Variety or Music Program	Jon Stewart	Nominated
2006	Outstanding Variety, Music or Comedy Series	Jon Stewart, Stewart Bailey, Kahane Corn, David Javerbaum, Ben Karlin	Won
2006	Outstanding Writing for a Variety, Music or Comedy Program	Rich Blomquist, Steve Bodow, Rachel Axler, Kevin Bleyer, Tim Carvell, Stephen Colbert, Eric Drysdale, J. R. Havlan, Scott Jacobson, David Javerbaum, Ben Karlin, Rob Kutner, Sam Means, Chris Regan, Jason Reich, Jason Ross, Jon Stewart	Won
2007	Outstanding Variety, Music or Comedy Series	Jon Stewart, Ben Karlin, David Javerbaum, Kahane Corn, Josh Lieb, Rory Albanese, Jim Margolis	Won
2007	Outstanding Writing for a Variety, Music or Comedy Program	Steve Bodow, Rachel Axler, Kevin Bleyer, Rich Blomquist, Tim Carvell, J. R. Havlan, Scott Jacobson, David Javerbaum, Ben Karlin, Rob Kutner, Josh Lieb, Sam Means, Jason Reich, Jason Ross, Jon Stewart	Nominated
2007	Outstanding Individual Performance in a Variety or Music Program	Jon Stewart	Nominated
2008	Outstanding Variety, Music or Comedy Series	Jon Stewart, David Javerbaum, Rory Albanese, Kahane Corn, Josh Lieb, Jim Margolis, Jennifer Flanz	Won
2008	Outstanding Writing for a Variety, Music or Comedy Program	Steve Bodow, Rory Albanese, Rachel Axler, Kevin Bleyer, Rich Blomquist, Tim Carvell, J. R. Havlan, Scott Jacobson, David Javerbaum, Rob Kutner, Josh Lieb, Sam Means, John Oliver, Jason Ross, Jon Stewart	Nominated
2009	Outstanding Variety, Music or Comedy Series	Jon Stewart, David Javerbaum, Rory Albanese, Josh Lieb, Kahane Corn, Jennifer Flanz, Jim Margolis, Steve Bodow, Adam Lowitt, Jill Katz	Won
2009	Outstanding Writing for a Variety, Music or Comedy Series	Steve Bodow, David Javerbaum, Josh Lieb, Rory Albanese, Kevin Bleyer, Jason Ross, Tim Carvell, John Oliver, Sam Means, Rob Kutner, J. R. Havlan, Rich Blomquist, Wyatt Cenac, Elliott Kalan, Rachel Axler, Jon Stewart	Won
2010	Outstanding Variety, Music or Comedy Series	Jon Stewart, Rory Albanese, Josh Lieb, Kahane Cooperman, Steve Bodow, Jennifer Flanz, Hillary Kun, Adam Lowitt, Jim Margolis, Jill Katz	Won
2010	Outstanding Writing for a Variety, Music or Comedy Series	Steve Bodow, Rory Albanese, Kevin Bleyer, Rich Blomquist, Tim Carvell, Wyatt Cenac, Hallie Haglund, J. R. Havlan, David Javerbaum, Elliott Kalan, Josh Lieb, Sam Means, Jo Miller, John Oliver, Daniel Radosh, Jason Ross and Jon Stewart	Nominated
2011	Outstanding Variety, Music or Comedy Series	Jon Stewart, Rory Albanese, Josh Lieb, Kahane Cooperman, Steve Bodow, Jennifer Flanz, Jim Margolis, Pamela DePace, Hillary Kun, Adam Lowitt, Jill Katz	Won
2011	Outstanding Writing for a Variety, Music or Comedy Series	Steve Bodow, Tim Carvell, Rory Albanese, Kevin Bleyer, Rich Blomquist, Wyatt Cenac, Hallie Haglund, J. R. Havlan, Elliott Kalan, Josh Lieb, Sam Means, Jo Miller, John Oliver, Daniel Radosh, Jason Ross and Jon Stewart	Won
2012	Outstanding Variety Series	Jon Stewart, Rory Albanese, Kahane Cooperman, Steve Bodow, Jennifer Flanz, Adam Lowitt, Jim Margolis, Pamela DePace, Hillary Kun, Timothy Greenberg, Stuart Miller, Jill Katz	Won
2012	Outstanding Writing for a Variety Series	Tim Carvell, Rory Albanese, Kevin Bleyer, Rich Blomquist, Steve Bodow, Wyatt Cenac, Hallie Haglund, J.R. Havlan, Elliott Kalan, Dan McCoy, Jo Miller, John Oliver, Zhubin Parang, Daniel Radosh, Jason Ross and Jon Stewart	Won
2013	Outstanding Variety Series	Jon Stewart, Steve Bodow, Jennifer Flanz, Adam Lowitt, Rory Albanese, Tim Greenberg, Hillary Kun, Tim Carvell, Pamela DePace, Justin Melkmann, Stuart Miller, Kahane Cooperman, Jill Katz	Nominated
2013	Outstanding Writing for a Variety Series	Rory Albanese, Kevin Bleyer, Steve Bodow, Tim Carvell, Travon Free, Hallie Haglund, J.R. Havlan, Elliott Kalan, Dan McCoy, Jo Miller, John Oliver, Zhubin Parang, Daniel Radosh, Jason Ross, Lauren Sarver, Jon Stewart	Nominated
2014	Outstanding Variety Series	Jon Stewart, Steve Bodow, Jennifer Flanz, Adam Lowitt, Rory Albanese, Tim Greenberg, Hillary Kun, Tim Carvell, Pamela DePace, Justin Melkmann, Stuart Miller, Kahane Cooperman, Jill Katz	Nominated
2014	Outstanding Writing for a Variety Series	Rory Albanese, Dan Amira, Steve Bodow, Tim Carvell, Travon Free, Hallie Haglund, J.R. Havlan, Elliott Kalan, Matt Koff, Dan McCoy, Jo Miller, John Oliver, Zhubin Parang, Daniel Radosh, Lauren Sarver, Jon Stewart	Nominated
2015	Outstanding Variety Talk Series	Jon Stewart, Adam Lowitt, Jennifer Flanz, Steve Bodow, Tim Greenberg, Jill Katz, Hillary Kun, Stuart Miller, Pamela DePace, Justin Melkmann, Kahane Cooperman	Won
2015	Outstanding Writing for a Variety Series	Dan Amira, Steve Bodow, Travon Free, Hallie Haglund, Elliott Kalan, Matt Koff, Adam Lowitt, Dan McCoy, Jo Miller, Zhubin Parang, Owen Parsons, Daniel Radosh, Lauren Sarver, Jon Stewart, Delaney Yeager	Won
2015	Outstanding Directing for a Variety Series	Chuck O'Neil	Won
2018	Outstanding Variety Talk Series	Trevor Noah, Steve Bodow, Jennifer Flanz, Jill Katz, Justin Melkmann, Max Browning, Eric Davies, Pamela DePace, Ramin Hedayati, Elise Terrell, Zhubin Parang and David Kibuuka	Nominated
2019	Outstanding Variety Talk Series	Trevor Noah, Steve Bodow, Jennifer Flanz, Jill Katz, Justin Melkmann, David Kibuuka, Max Browning, Eric Davies, Pamela DePace, Ramin Hedayati, Elise Terrell, Jocelyn Conn and Zhubin Parang	Nominated
2020	Outstanding Variety Talk Series	Trevor Noah, Jennifer Flanz, Jill Katz, Justin Melkmann, Max Browning, Eric Davies, Pamela DePace, Ramin Hedayati, David Kibuuka, Zhubin Parang, Elise Terrell, David Paul Meyer, Jocelyn Conn, Beth Shorr and Shawna Shepherd	Nominated
2020	Outstanding Writing for a Variety Series	Dan Amira, Lauren Sarver Means, Daniel Radosh, David Angelo, Devin Delliquanti, Zach DiLanzo, Geoff Haggerty, Josh Johnson, David Kibuuka, Matt Koff, X Mayo, Christiana Mbakwe, Dan McCoy, Trevor Noah, Joseph Opio, Randall Otis, Zhubin Parang, Kat Radley and Scott Sherman	Nominated
2020	Outstanding Directing for a Variety Series	David Paul Meyer	Nominated
2021	Outstanding Variety Talk Series	Trevor Noah, Jennifer Flanz, Jill Katz, Justin Melkmann, Max Browning, Eric Davies, Pamela DePace, Ramin Hedayati, David Kibuuka, David Paul Meyer, Zhubin Parang, Elise Terrell, Dan Amira, Jocelyn Conn, Jeff Gussow, Shawna Shepherd, Beth Shorr	Nominated
2022	Outstanding Variety Talk Series	Trevor Noah, Jennifer Flanz, Jill Katz, Justin Melkmann, Ian Berger, Max Browning, Pamela DePace, Ramin Hedayati, David Kibuuka, David Paul Meyer, Zhubin Parang, Elise Terrell, Dan Amira, Jocelyn Conn, Jeff Gussow, Brittany Radocha, Shawna Shepherd and Beth Shorr	Nominated
2022	Outstanding Writing for a Variety Special	Ian Berger, Devin Delliquanti, Jennifer Flanz, Jordan Klepper, Zhubin Parang, and Scott Sherman (for The Daily Show with Trevor Noah Presents: Jordan Klepper Fingers the Globe – Hungary for Democracy)	Nominated
2023	Outstanding Talk Series	Trevor Noah, Jennifer Flanz, Jill Katz, Justin Melkmann, Ian Berger, Max Browning, Pamela DePace, Ramin Hedayati, David Kibuuka, David Paul Meyer, Zhubin Parang, Elise Terrell, Dan Amira, Jocelyn Conn, Jeff Gussow, Brittany Radocha, Shawna Shepherd and Beth Shorr	Won
2023	Outstanding Writing for a Variety Series	Dan Amira, Lauren Sarver Means, Daniel Radosh, David Angelo, Devin Delliquanti, Zach DiLanzo, Jennifer Flanz, Jason Gilbert, Josh Johnson, David Kibuuka, Matt Koff, Trevor Noah, Joseph Opio, Randall Otis, Zhubin Parang, Kat Radley, Scott Sherman and Ashton Womack	Nominated
2024	Outstanding Talk Series	Jon Stewart, Jennifer Flanz, James "Baby Doll" Dixon, Ramin Hedayati, Justin Melkmann, Zhubin Parang, Ian Berger, Max Browning, Pamela DePace, David Kibuuka, David Paul Meyer, Elise Terrell, Sushil Dayal, Dan Amira, Jocelyn Conn, Jeff Gussow, Brittany Radocha, Shawna Shepherd, Beth Shorr, Ronny Chieng, Jordan Klepper, Michael Kosta, Desi Lydic and Dulcé Sloan	Won
2024	Outstanding Writing for a Variety Series	Dan Amira, Lauren Sarver Means, Daniel Radosh, David Angelo, Nicole Conlan, Devin Delliquanti, Zach DiLanzo, Jennifer Flanz, Jason Gilbert, Dina Hashem, Scott Hercman, Josh Johnson, David Kibuuka, Matt Koff, Matt O'Brien, Joseph Opio, Randall Otis, Zhubin Parang, Kat Radley, Lanee' Sanders, Scott Sherman, Jon Stewart, Ashton Womack and Sophie Zucker	Nominated
2025	Outstanding Talk Series	Jon Stewart, Jennifer Flanz, James "Baby Doll" Dixon, Ramin Hedayati, Justin Melkmann, Zhubin Parang, Elise Terrell, Dan Amira, Ian Berger, Max Browning, Sushil Dayal, Pamela DePace, David Kibuuka, David Paul Meyer, Jocelyn Conn, Jeff Gussow, Matt O'Brien, Brittany Radocha, Daniel Radosh, Shawna Shepherd, Beth Shorr, Fiona Wozniak, Ronny Chieng, Jordan Klepper, Michael Kosta and Desi Lydic	Nominated
2025	Outstanding Writing for a Variety Series	Dan Amira, Daniel Radosh, Lauren Sarver Means, David Angelo, Nicole Conlan, Devin Delliquanti, Zach DiLanzo, Jennifer Flanz, Jason Gilbert, Dina Hashem, Scott Hercman, David Kibuuka, Matt Koff, Matt O'Brien, Joseph Opio, Randall Otis, Zhubin Parang, Kat Radley, Lanee' Sanders, Scott Sherman, Jon Stewart, Ashton Womack and Sophie Zucker	Nominated
2026	Outstanding Variety Series	Jon Stewart, Jennifer Flanz, James "Baby Doll" Dixon, Ramin Hedayati, Justin Melkmann, Zhubin Parang, Elise Terrell, Dan Amira, Ian Berger, Max Browning, Sushil Dayal, Pamela DePace, David Kibuuka, David Paul Meyer, Jocelyn Conn, Jeff Gussow, Matt O'Brien, Brittany Radocha, Daniel Radosh, Shawna Shepherd, Beth Shorr Fiona Wozniak, Lisa Cortez, Ronny Chieng, Josh Johnson, Jordan Klepper, Michael Kosta and Desi Lydic	Pending

=== Primetime Creative Arts Emmy Awards ===
List of Creative Arts Emmy Awards and nominations received by The Daily Show
Year	Category	Nominee(s)	Episode	Result
2004	Outstanding Directing for a Variety, Music or Comedy Program	Chuck O'Neil	#8086	Nominated
2005	Outstanding Directing for a Variety, Music or Comedy Program	Chuck O'Neil	#9010	Nominated
2006	Outstanding Directing for a Variety, Music or Comedy Program	Chuck O'Neil	#10140	Nominated
2007	Outstanding Directing for a Variety, Music or Comedy Program	Chuck O'Neil	#12061	Nominated
2007	Outstanding Multi-Camera Picture Editing for a Series	Tonya Dreher, Graham Frazier, Mark Paone, Daric Schlesselman, Einar Westerlund, Rob York	#12043	Nominated
2007	Outstanding Sound Mixing for a Variety or Music Series or Special	Tim Lester	#12061	Nominated
2008	Outstanding Directing for a Variety, Music or Comedy Program	Chuck O'Neil	#13050	Nominated
2009	Outstanding Directing for a Variety, Music or Comedy Series	Chuck O'Neil	#13107	Nominated
2009	Outstanding Short Form Picture Editing	Graham Frazier	#13098	Nominated
2009	Outstanding Short Form Picture Editing	Einar Westerlund	#13109	Nominated
2010	Outstanding Directing for a Variety, Music or Comedy Series	Chuck O'Neil	#15054	Nominated
2010	Outstanding Technical Direction, Camerawork, Video Control for a Series	Andre Allen, Tom Dowling, Tim Quigley, Rich York, Phil Salanto, Paul Ranieri	#15032	Nominated
2011	Outstanding Directing for a Variety, Music or Comedy Series	Chuck O'Neil	#16048	Nominated
2011	Outstanding Technical Direction, Camerawork, Video Control for a Series	Andre Allen, Tom Dowling, Tim Quigley, Phil Salanto, Rich York, Paul Ranieri	#15135	Nominated
2012	Outstanding Directing for a Variety Series	Chuck O'Neil	#17087	Nominated
2012	Outstanding Picture Editing for Short-Form Segments and Variety Specials	Eric Davies	#17051	Nominated
2013	Outstanding Directing for a Variety Series	Chuck O'Neil	#17153	Nominated
2013	Outstanding Picture Editing for Short-Form Segments and Variety Specials	Einar Westerlund	#18092	Won
2013	Outstanding Sound Mixing for a Variety Series or Special	Tim Lester, Horst Hartmann, Rocky Magistro, Jay Vicari	#17153	Nominated
2013	Outstanding Technical Direction, Camerawork, Video Control for a Series	Andre Allen, Tom Dowling, Tim Quigley, Phil Salanto, Rich York, Franco Coello, Paul Ranieri	#18020	Nominated
2014	Outstanding Directing for a Variety Series	Chuck O'Neil	#18153	Nominated
2014	Outstanding Multi-Camera Picture Editing for a Comedy Series	Robert York, Eric Davies, Graham Frazier, Daric Schlesselman	#19006	Nominated
2014	Outstanding Picture Editing for Short-Form Segments and Variety Special	Eric Davies	N/A	Won
2014	Outstanding Technical Direction, Camerawork, Video Control for a Series	Andre Allen, Tom Dowling, Tim Quigley, Phil Salanto, Rich York, Paul Ranieri	#18153	Nominated
2015	Outstanding Technical Direction, Camerawork, Video Control for a Series	Andre Allen, Tom Dowling, Paul Manecky, Tim Quigley, Phil Salanto, Rich York, Paul Ranieri	#20015	Nominated
2017	Outstanding Short Form Variety Series	Trevor Noah, executive producer/host; Jennifer Flanz and Steve Bodow, executive producers; Ramin Hedayati, supervising producer; Jocelyn Conn, produced by	Between the Scenes	Won
2018	Outstanding Short Form Variety Series	Trevor Noah, executive producer/host; Jennifer Flanz and Steve Bodow, executive producers; Ramin Hedayati, supervising producer; Jocelyn Conn, produced by	Between the Scenes	Nominated
2018	Outstanding Interactive Program	Trevor Noah, The Daily Show Digital Team and Comedy Central Digital Team	The Daily Show.com	Nominated
2019	Outstanding Interactive Program	Trevor Noah, The Daily Show Digital Team and Comedy Central Digital Team	The Daily Show.com	Nominated
2020	Outstanding Short Form Nonfiction or Reality Series	Trevor Noah, executive producer/host; Jennifer Flanz, executive producer; Ramin Hedayati, supervising producer; Matt Negrin and Ryan Middleton, producers; Jocelyn Conn, produced by	Between the Scenes	Nominated
2020	Outstanding Picture Editing for Variety Programming	Mike Choi, Tom Favilla, Nikolai Johnson, Mark Paone, Erin Shannon, Catherine Trasborg, Einar Westerlund and Robert York	"Trump's Coronavirus Address (Bloopers Included) and Trevor's Audience Tribute Song"	Nominated
2020	Outstanding Sound Mixing for a Variety Series or Special	Tim Lester and Patrick Weaver	"Jessie Reyez"	Nominated
2021	Outstanding Writing for a Variety Special	Jordan Klepper, Ian Berger, Devin Delliquanti, and Zhubin Parang	Jordan Klepper Fingers the Pulse: Into the MAGAverse	Nominated
2022	Outstanding Short Form Nonfiction or Reality Series	Trevor Noah, Jennifer Flanz, Ramin Hedayati, David Kibuuka, Folake Ayiloge and Jocelyn Conn	Between the Scenes	Nominated
2022	Outstanding Picture Editing for Variety Programming	Storm Choi, Eric Davies, Tom Favilla, Lauren Beckett Jackson, Nikolai Johnson, Ryan Middleton, Mark Paone, Erin Shannon, Catherine Trasborg, and Einar Westerlund	"Jordan Klepper Takes on 'Wellness' Anti-Vaxxers + Fringewatching Rep. Lauren Boebert"	Nominated
2022	Outstanding Technical Direction, Camerawork, Video Control for a Series	Michael Williams, Matt Muro, Rich York, Tim Quigley, Phil Salanto, Ricardo Sarmiento, and Joel Sadler	"Robert Glasper Performs 'Heaven's Here'"	Nominated
2023	Outstanding Picture Editing for Variety Programming	Storm Choi, Eric Davies, Tom Favilla, Lauren Beckett Jackson, Nikolai Johnson, Ryan Middleton, Mark Paone, Erin Shannon, Catherine Trasborg, and Einar Westerlund	"Jordan Klepper Shows Trump Supporters January 6th Hearing Clips"	Nominated
2024	Outstanding Short Form Nonfiction or Reality Series	Jon Stewart, Jennifer Flanz, Ramin Hedayati, Jocelyn Conn, Folake Ayiloge and Daniel Radosh	After the Cut	Nominated
2024	Outstanding Performer in a Short Form Comedy or Drama Series	Desi Lydic	Desi Lydic Foxsplains	Nominated
2024	Outstanding Directing for a Variety Series	Davud Paul Meyer	"Jon Stewart Returns to The Daily Show"	Nominated
2024	Outstanding Picture Editing for Variety Programming (Segment)	Catherine Trasborg	"The Dailyshowography of Vivek Ramaswamy: Enter the RamaVerse"	Won
2024	Outstanding Technical Direction and Camerawork for a Special	Bernardo Garcia, Al Johnson, Andrew Maso, Patrick O'Donnel, Joel Sadler, Bart Sienkiewicz, and Jim Wells	Jordan Klepper Fingers the Pulse: Moscow Tools	Nominated
2025	Outstanding Hosted Nonfiction Series or Special	Jordan Klepper, Ian Berger, Jennifer Flanz, Zhubin Parang, Sushil Dayal, Abby Arora and Jessie Kanevsky	Jordan Klepper Fingers the Pulse: MAGA: The Next Generation	Nominated
2025	Outstanding Writing for a Nonfiction Program	Ian Berger, Jordan Klepper, Jennifer Flanz, Devin Delliquanti, and Scott Sherman	Jordan Klepper Fingers the Pulse: MAGA: The Next Generation	Won
2025	Outstanding Short Form Comedy, Drama or Variety Series	Desi Lydic, Jennifer Flanz, Ramin Hedayati, Jocelyn Conn, Matt Negrin and Jason Gilbert	Desi Lydic Foxsplains	Won
2025	Outstanding Performer in a Short Form Comedy or Drama Series	Desi Lydic	Desi Lydic Foxsplains	Won
2025	Outstanding Production Design for a Variety or Reality Series	Dave Edwards and Lauren Browning	"Jon Stewart & the News Team Live at the Chicago DNC"	Nominated
2025	Outstanding Directing for a Variety Series	David Paul Meyer	"Jon Stewart Delivers a Mug-Smashing Take on Musk's DOGE"	Nominated
2025	Outstanding Picture Editing for Variety Programming (Segment)	Lauren Beckett Jackson	"The Dailyshowography of Kamala Harris: Just Normal"	Nominated
2025	Outstanding Picture Editing for Variety Programming (Segment)	Storm Choi	"The Dailyshowography of Stephen Miller: What He Does in the Shadows"	Nominated
2025	Outstanding Sound Mixing for a Variety Series or Special	John Neroulas and Patrick Weaver	"Jon Stewart and the News Team Live at the Chicago DNC"	Nominated
2025	Outstanding Technical Direction and Camerawork for a Series	Michael Williams, John Floresca, Charlie Foerschner, Jeff Latonero, James McEvoy, Matt Muro, Tim Quigley, Phil Salanto, Michael Schmehl, and Rich York	"Jon Stewart and the News Team Live at the Chicago DNC"	Nominated
2026	Outstanding Hosted Nonfiction Series or Special	Jordan Klepper, Ian Berger, Jennifer Flanz, Zhubin Parang, Sushil Dayal, Abby Arora and Jessie Kanevsky	Jordan Klepper Fingers the Pulse: Give the Man a Prize	Pending
2026	Outstanding Writing for a Nonfiction Program	Jennifer Flanz, Ian Berger, Zhubin Parang, Devin Delliquanti, Scott Sherman, and Jordan Klepper	Jordan Klepper Fingers the Pulse: Give the Man a Prize	Pending
2026	Outstanding Short Form Comedy, Drama, or Variety Series	Desi Lydic, Jennifer Flanz, Ramin Hedayati, Jocelyn Conn, Jason Gilbert and Matt Negrin	Desi Lydic Foxsplains	Pending
2026	Outstanding Performer in a Short Form Comedy or Drama Series	Desi Lydic	Desi Lydic Foxsplains	Pending
2026	Outstanding Picture Editing for Variety Programming (Segment)	Nikolai Johnson	"RFK Hospital: An Original Series Inspired by the Medical Advice of RFK Jr."	Pending
2026	Outstanding Technical Direction and Camerawork for a Series	Michael Williams, Jeff Latonero, Matt Muro, Phil Salanto, Michael Schmehl, Tim Quigley, and Rich York	#30105	Pending

== GLAAD Media Awards ==
The GLAAD Media Awards were created in 1990 by the Gay & Lesbian Alliance Against Defamation to "recognize and honor media for their fair, accurate and inclusive representations of the LGBT community and the issues that affect their lives." The Daily Show has received two awards from four nominations.

List of GLAAD Media Awards and nominations received by The Daily Show
Year	Category	Result	Ref.
2005	Special Recognition	Won	
2013	Outstanding Talk Show Episode	Nominated	
2017	Outstanding Talk Show Episode	Won	
2018	Outstanding Talk Show Episode	Nominated	
2021	Outstanding Talk Show Episode	Nominated	
2022	Outstanding Talk Show Episode	Nominated	

== Grammy Awards ==
The Grammy Awards are awarded annually by the National Academy of Recording Arts and Sciences of the United States for outstanding achievements in the music industry. Often considered the highest music honour, the awards were established in 1958. The Daily Show has received two awards.

List of Grammy Awards and nominations received by The Daily Show
Year	Category	Nominee(s)	Work	Result	Ref.
2005	Best Comedy Album	Jon Stewart and the cast of The Daily Show	America (The Book): A Citizen's Guide to Democracy Inactionp	Won	
2011	Best Spoken Word Album	Jon Stewart and The Daily Show staff	Earth (The Book): A Visitor's Guide to the Human Race	Won	

== Peabody Awards ==
The George Foster Peabody Awards or simply Peabody Awards is named after American businessman and philanthropist George Peabody, which recognizes distinguished and meritorious public service by American radio and television stations, networks, online media, producing organizations, and individuals. The Daily Show has received three awards.

List of Peabody Awards awarded to The Daily Show
Year	For	Winner(s)	Result	Ref.
2000	Indecision 2000 coverage	Mad Cow Productions, Inc., in association with Comedy Central	Won	
2004	Indecision 2004 coverage	Comedy Central	Won	
2015	The Daily Show	Comedy Central	Won	

== Television Critics Association Awards ==
The TCA Award is an annual accolade bestowed by the Television Critics Association in recognition of outstanding achievements in television. The Daily Show has won four awards from a total of twenty-six nominations.

List of TCA Awards and nominations received by The Daily Show
Year	Category	Nominee(s)	Result	Ref.
2003	Individual Achievement in Comedy	Jon Stewart	Won	
2003	Outstanding Achievement in Comedy		Won	
2003	Program of the Year		Nominated	
2003	Outstanding Achievement in News and Information		Nominated	
2004	Individual Achievement in Comedy	Jon Stewart	Nominated	
2004	Outstanding Achievement in Comedy		Nominated	
2004	Program of the Year		Nominated	
2004	Outstanding Achievement in News and Information		Won	
2005	Individual Achievement in Comedy	Jon Stewart	Won	
2005	Outstanding Achievement in Comedy		Nominated	
2005	Program of the Year		Nominated	
2005	Outstanding Achievement in News and Information		Nominated	
2006	Individual Achievement in Comedy	Jon Stewart	Nominated	
2006	Outstanding Achievement in Comedy		Nominated	
2007	Individual Achievement in Comedy	Jon Stewart	Nominated	
2007	Outstanding Achievement in Comedy		Nominated	
2008	Outstanding Achievement in Comedy		Nominated	
2009	Outstanding Achievement in Comedy		Nominated	
2010	Outstanding Achievement in News and Information		Nominated	
2011	Outstanding Individual Achievement in Comedy	Jon Stewart	Nominated	
2012	Outstanding Achievement in News and Information		Nominated	
2013	Outstanding Achievement in News and Information		Nominated	
2014	Outstanding Achievement in News and Information		Nominated	
2015	Outstanding Achievement in News and Information		Nominated	
2020	Outstanding Achievement in Sketch/Variety Shows		Nominated	
2021	Outstanding Achievement in Variety, Talk or Sketch		Nominated	

== Writers Guild of America Awards ==
The Writers Guild of America Award is an annual accolade bestowed by the Writers Guild of America in recognition of outstanding achievements in film and television writing, since 1949. The Daily Show has received one award from twelve nominations.

List of Writers Guild of America Awards and nominations received by The Daily Show
Year	Category	Nominee(s)	Result	Ref.
2007	Comedy/Variety – (Including Talk) Series	Jon Stewart, Rachel Axler, Kevin Bleyer, Rich Blomquist, Steve Bodow, Tim Carvell, J. R. Havlan, Scott Jacobson, David Javerbaum, Ben Karlin, Rob Kutner, Sam Means, Chris Regan, Jason Reich, Jason Ross	Nominated	
2008	Comedy/Variety (Including Talk) – Series	Jon Stewart, Steve Bodow, Rachel Axler, Kevin Bleyer, Rich Blomquist, Tim Carvell, J. R. Havlan, Scott Jacobson, David Javerbaum, Rob Kutner, Josh Lieb, Sam Means, Jason Reich, Jason Ross	Nominated	
2009	Comedy/Variety (Including Talk) – Series	Jon Stewart, Steve Bodow, Rory Albanese, Rachel Axler, Kevin Bleyer, Rich Blomquist, Tim Carvell, Wyatt Cenac, J. R. Havlan, David Javerbaum, Rob Kutner, Josh Lieb, Sam Means, John Oliver, Jason Ross	Nominated	
2010	Comedy/Variety (Including Talk) – Series	Jon Stewart, Steve Bodow, Rory Albanese, Kevin Bleyer, Rich Blomquist, Tim Carvell, Wyatt Cenac, Hallie Haglund, J. R. Havlan, David Javerbaum, Elliott Kalan, Josh Lieb, Sam Means, Jo Miller, John Oliver, Daniel Radosh, Jason Ross	Won	
2011	Comedy/Variety (Including Talk) – Series	Jon Stewart, Steve Bodow, Rory Albanese, Kevin Bleyer, Rich Blomquist, Tim Carvell, Wyatt Cenac, Hallie Haglund, J. R. Havlan, Elliott Kalan, Josh Lieb, Sam Means, Jo Miller, John Oliver, Daniel Radosh, Jason Ross	Nominated	
2012	Comedy/Variety (Including Talk) – Series	Jon Stewart, Rory Albanese, Kevin Bleyer, Rich Blomquist, Steve Bodow, Tim Carvell, Wyatt Cenac, Hallie Haglund, J. R. Havlan, Elliott Kalan, Dan McCoy, Sam Means, Jo Miller, John Oliver, Zhubin Parang, Daniel Radosh, Jason Ross	Nominated	
2013	Comedy/Variety (Including Talk) – Series	Jon Stewart, Rory Albanese, Kevin Bleyer, Rich Blomquist, Steve Bodow, Tim Carvell, Hallie Haglund, J. R. Havlan, Elliott Kalan, Dan McCoy, Jo Miller, John Oliver, Zhubin Parang, Daniel Radosh, Jason Ross, Lauren Sarver	Nominated	
2014	Comedy/Variety (Including Talk) – Series	Jon Stewart, Rory Albanese, Steve Bodow, Tim Carvell, Travon Free, Hallie Haglund, J. R. Havlan, Elliott Kalan, Matt Koff, Dan McCoy, Jo Miller, John Oliver, Zhubin Parang, Daniel Radosh, Jason Ross, Lauren Sarver	Nominated	
2015	Comedy/Variety (Including Talk) – Series	Jon Stewart, Rory Albanese, Dan Amira, Steve Bodow, Tim Carvell, Travon Free, Hallie Haglund, J. R. Havlan, Elliott Kalan, Matt Koff, Adam Lowitt, Dan McCoy, Jo Miller, John Oliver, Zhubin Parang, Owen Parsons, Daniel Radosh, Lauren Sarver, Delaney Yeager	Nominated	
2016	Comedy/Variety – Talk Series	Jon Stewart, Dan Amira, Steve Bodow, Travon Free, Hallie Haglund, Elliott Kalan, Matt Koff, Adam Lowitt, Dan McCoy, Jo Miller, Zhubin Parang, Owen Parsons, Daniel Radosh, Lauren Sarver, Delaney Yeager	Nominated	
2017	Comedy/Variety – Talk Series	Trevor Noah, Dan Amira, David Angelo, Steve Bodow, Devin Delliquanti, Zach DiLanzo, Travon Free, Hallie Haglund, David Kibuuka, Matt Koff, Adam Lowitt, Dan McCoy, Joe Opio, Zhubin Parang, Owen Parsons, Daniel Radosh, Lauren Sarver, Delaney Yeager, Michelle Wolf	Nominated	
2018	Comedy/Variety – Talk Series	Trevor Noah, Dan Amira, David Angelo, Steve Bodow, Kashana Cauley, Devin Delliquanti, Zach DiLanzo, Hallie Haglund, David Kibuuka, Matt Koff, Adam Lowitt, Dan McCoy, Joe Opio, Zhubin Parang, Owen Parsons, Daniel Radosh, Lauren Sarver-Means, Michelle Wolf	Nominated	

== Other awards ==
List of all other awards and nominations received by The Daily Show
Year	Award	Category	Nominee(s)	Result	Ref.
2001	American Comedy Awards	Funniest Male Performer in a TV Special – Network, Cable or Syndication	Jon Stewart	Nominated	
2014	American Comedy Awards	Best Late Night Talk Show		Won	
2007	ASTRA Awards	Favourite International Personality or Actor	Jon Stewart	Nominated	
2008	ASTRA Awards	Favourite International Program		Nominated	
2011	The Comedy Awards	Late Night Comedy Series		Won	
2012	The Comedy Awards	Late Night Comedy Series		Won	
1997	CableACE Award	Best Entertainment Host	Craig Kilborn	Nominated	
2005	Canadian Comedy Award	Pretty Funny TV Female	Samantha Bee	Won	
2010	Dorian Awards	Savage Wit of the Year	Jon Stewart and the writers	Nominated	
2013	Dorian Awards	Wilde Wit of the Year	Jon Stewart	Won	
2015	Dorian Awards	TV Current Affairs Show of the Year		Won	
2015	Dorian Awards	Wilde Wit of the Year	Jon Stewart	Nominated	
2016	Dorian Awards	TV Current Affairs Show of the Year		Nominated	
2007	Genesis Awards	Sid Caesar Comedy Award		Nominated	
2017	MTV Movie & TV Awards	Best Host	Trevor Noah	Won	
2016	NAACP Image Awards	Outstanding Talk Series		Nominated	
2016	NAACP Image Awards	Outstanding Variety (Series or Special)		Nominated	
2016	NAACP Image Awards	Outstanding Host in a News, Talk, Reality, or Variety (Series or Special)	Trevor Noah	Nominated	
2018	NAACP Image Awards	Outstanding Talk Series		Nominated	
2018	NAACP Image Awards	Outstanding Host in a Talk or News/Information (Series or Special) – Individual or Ensemble	Trevor Noah	Nominated	
2005	People's Choice Awards	Favorite Late Night Talk Show Host	Jon Stewart	Nominated	
2005	People's Choice Awards	Favorite Funny Male Star	Jon Stewart	Nominated	
2018	People's Choice Awards	Nighttime Talk Show of the Year		Nominated	
2005	Satellite Award	Best Television Series – Musical or Comedy		Won	
2002	Teen Choice Awards	Choice TV: Personality	Jon Stewart	Nominated	
2003	Teen Choice Awards	Choice TV – Late Night		Nominated	
