= List of The Daily Show writers =

The following is a list of The Daily Show writers. The show, created by Madeleine Smithberg and Lizz Winstead is an American political satire and news satire. The show, which has aired since 1996, has employed a large and changing staff of writers.

== The Daily Show with Craig Kilborn (1996–1998) ==
Head writer(s)
- Chris Kreski (1998)
- Madeleine Smithberg (1996–1997)
- Lizz Winstead (1996–1997)
Writing staff
- A. Whitney Brown (1996–1998)
- Stephen Colbert (1997–1998)
- Jim Earl (1996–1999)
- Daniel J. Goor (1998)
- Charlie Grandy (1998)
- J. R. Havlan (1996–1998)
- Ray James (1996–1999)
- Tom Johnson (1996–1998)
- Kent Jones (1996–1998)
- Craig Kilborn (1996–1998)
- Paul Mecurio (1996–1998)
- Guy Nicolucci (1996–1998)
- Steve Rosenfield (1996–1998)

== The Daily Show with Jon Stewart (1999–2015) ==
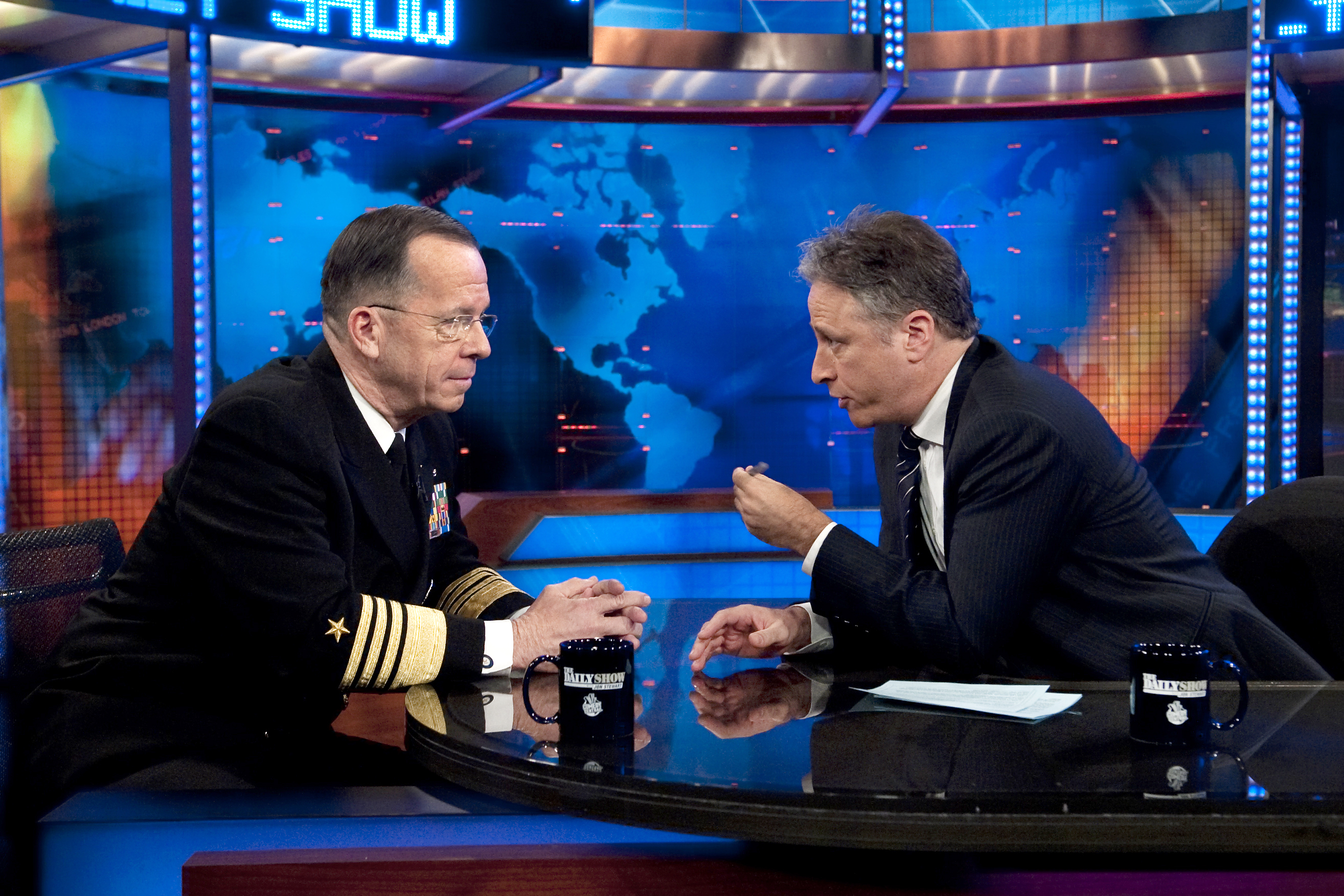
Jon Stewart hosting an episode of The Daily Show in 2010

Head writer(s)
- Steve Bodow (2007–2010)
- Tim Carvell (2011–2014)
- Elliott Kalan (2014–2015)
- David Javerbaum (2003–2006)
- Ben Karlin (1999–2002)
- Chris Kreski (1999)
Writing staff
- Rory Albanese (2007–2013)
- Dan Amira (2014–2015)
- Rachel Axler (2005–2008)
- Aaron Bergeron (2002)
- Jonathan Bines (2002)
- Kevin Bleyer (2005–2013)
- Rich Blomquist (2003–2012)
- Steve Bodow (2003–2015)
- Tim Carvell (2004–2014)
- Wyatt Cenac (2008–2011)
- Stephen Colbert (1999–2005)
- Eric Drysdale (2001–2005)
- Jim Earl (1999–2001)
- Travon Free (2012–2015)
- Daniel J. Goor (1999–2001)
- Charlie Grandy (1999–2001)
- Hallie Haglund (2010–2015)
- J. R. Havlan (1999–2014)
- Scott Jacobson (2003–2008)
- David Javerbaum (1999–2010)
- Tom Johnson (1999–2003)
- Kent Jones (1999–2001)
- Elliott Kalan (2008–2015)
- Ben Karlin (1999–2006)
- Rob Kutner (2003–2009)
- Matt Koff (2013–2015)
- Josh Lieb (2007–2010)
- Dan McCoy (2011–2015)
- Sam Means (2006–2011)
- Paul Mecurio (1999–2002)
- Jo Miller (2009–2015)
- Guy Nicolucci (1999)
- John Oliver (2007–2013)
- Zhubin Parang (2011–2015)
- Owen Parsons (2014–2015)
- Daniel Radosh (2010–2015)
- Chris Regan (1999–2006)
- Jason Reich (2002–2007)
- Jason Ross (2003–2013)
- Lauren Sarver (2012–2015)
- Allison Silverman (2001–2002)
- Jon Stewart (1999–2015)
- Jeff Stilson (2001)
- Delaney Yeager (2014–2015)

== The Daily Show with Trevor Noah (2015–2022) ==
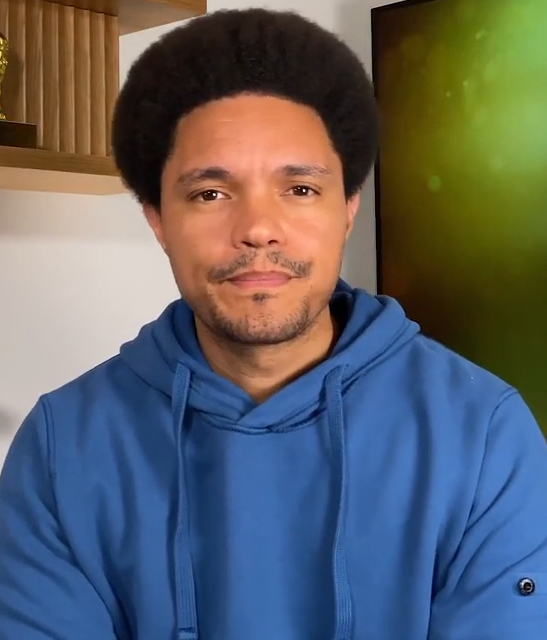
Trevor Noah hosting an episode of The Daily Show at home due to the COVID-19 pandemic in 2021

Head writer(s)
- Zhubin Parang (2015–2018)
- Dan Amira (2018–2022)
Writing staff
- Amberia Allen (2018)
- Dan Amira (2015–2022)
- David Angelo (2015–2022)
- Steve Bodow (2015–2019)
- Neal Brennan (2016–2017)
- Kashana Cauley (2017)
- Devin Delliquanti (2015–2022)
- Zach Dilanzo (2016–2022)
- Jen Flanz (2022)
- Travon Free (2015–2016)
- Jason O. Gilbert (2021–2022)
- Hallie Haglund (2015–2017)
- Geoff Haggerty (2017–2021)
- Josh Johnson (2017–2022)
- David Kibuuka (2015–2022)
- Matt Koff (2015–2022)
- Adam Lowitt (2015–2017)
- Alex Marino (2015–2016)
- X Mayo (2018–2021)
- Christiana Mbakwe (2019–2022)
- Dan McCoy (2015–2022)
- Lauren Sarver Means (2015–2018; senior writer: 2018–2022)
- Alingon Mitra (2016)
- Trevor Noah (2015–2022)
- Joseph Opio (2015–2022)
- Randall Otis (2019–2022)
- Owen Parsons (2015–2017)
- Zhubin Parang (2015–2022)
- Kat Radley (2017–2022)
- Daniel Radosh (senior writer: 2015–2022)
- Scott Sherman (2017–2022)
- Colleen Werthmann (2017–2018)
- Michelle Wolf (2016–2017)
- Ashton Womack (2021–2022)
- Delaney Yeager (2015–2016)

== The Daily Show (2023–present) ==
Head writer(s)
- Dan Amira (2023–present)
Writing staff
- David Angelo (2023–present)
- Romen Borsellino (2023)
- Nicole Conlan (2023–present)
- Devin Delliquanti (2023–present)
- Zach Dilanzo (2023–present)
- Jen Flanz (2023–present)
- Jason O. Gilbert (2023–present)
- Dina Hashem (2023–2025)
- Scott Hercman (2023–present)
- Josh Johnson (2023–present)
- David Kibuuka (2023–present)
- Matt Koff (2023–present)
- Lauren Sarver Means (senior writer: 2023–present)
- Joe Opio (2023–present)
- Randall Otis (2023–present)
- Zhubin Parang (2023–present)
- Kat Radley (2023–present)
- Daniel Radosh (senior writer: 2023–present)
- Lanee Sanders (2023–present)
- Scott Sherman (2023–present)
- Jon Stewart (2024–present)
- Prashanth Venkataramanujam (2023)
- Ashton Womack (2023–present)
- Sophie Zucker (2023–present)
