= Primetime Emmy Award for Outstanding Talk Series =

Annual television award

- Awarded for: Outstanding Talk Series
- Country: United States
- Presented by: Academy of Television Arts & Sciences
- First award: 2015
- Final award: 2025
- Website: emmys.com

The Primetime Emmy Award for Outstanding Talk Series was an award presented to the best television variety-style talk show of the year.

== History ==
In 2015, Outstanding Variety Series was separated into two categories, Outstanding Variety Sketch Series and Outstanding Variety Talk Series.

In 2023, the category was renamed Outstanding Talk Series.

In 2026, the split was reversed and the categories were remerged with Outstanding Variety Series returning at the 78th Primetime Emmy Awards.

== Winners and nominations ==
=== 2010s ===
Year	Program	Producers	Network
Outstanding Variety Talk Series
2015 (67th)
2015 (67th)	The Daily Show with Jon Stewart	Jon Stewart, executive producer/host; Adam Lowitt, Jennifer Flanz, Steve Bodow, Tim Greenberg and Jill Katz, executive producers; Hillary Kun, co-executive producer; Stuart Miller, Pamela DePace and Justin Melkmann, supervising producers; Kahane Cooperman, producer	Comedy Central
2015 (67th)	The Colbert Report	Stephen Colbert, executive producer/host; Jon Stewart and Tom Purcell, executive producers; Meredith Bennett, Emily Lazar and Barry Julien, co-executive producers; Tanya Bracco, Paul Dinello and Matt Lappin, supervising producers	Comedy Central
2015 (67th)	Jimmy Kimmel Live!	Jimmy Kimmel, executive producer/host; Jill Leiderman, executive producer; Doug DeLuca, Jason Schrift, Erin Irwin and David Craig, co-executive producers; Gary Greenberg, supervising producer; Jennifer Sharron, Tony Romero, Molly McNearney, Josh Weintraub, Ken Crosby and Seth Weidner, producers	ABC
2015 (67th)	Last Week Tonight with John Oliver	John Oliver, executive producer/host; Tim Carvell, executive producer; Liz Stanton, co-executive producer	HBO
2015 (67th)	Late Show with David Letterman	Barbara Gaines, Matt Roberts, Jude Brennan, Rob Burnett and Maria Pope, executive producers; Nancy Agostini, co-executive producer; Jerry Foley, Kathy Mavrikakis, Sheila Rogers and Brian Teta, supervising producers; Michael Buczkiewicz, producer; David Letterman, host	CBS
2015 (67th)	The Tonight Show Starring Jimmy Fallon	Lorne Michaels, executive producer; Jamie Granet Bederman, Katie Hockmeyer, Jim Juvonen and Brian McDonald, supervising producers; Gavin Purcell, producer; Josh Lieb, produced by; Jimmy Fallon, Host	NBC
2016 (68th)
2016 (68th)	Last Week Tonight with John Oliver	John Oliver, executive producer/host; Tim Carvell and Liz Stanton, executive producers; Diane Fitzgerald, producer	HBO
2016 (68th)	Comedians in Cars Getting Coffee	Jerry Seinfeld, produced by/host; Melissa Miller, Tammy Johnston, Denis Jensen, George Shapiro and Howard West, produced by	Crackle
2016 (68th)	Jimmy Kimmel Live!	Jimmy Kimmel, executive producer/host; Jill Leiderman, executive producer; Doug DeLuca, Jason Schrift, Erin Irwin and David Craig, co-executive producers; Gary Greenberg and Jennifer Sharron, supervising producers; Tony Romero, Molly McNearney, Josh Weintraub, Ken Crosby and Seth Weidner, producers	ABC
2016 (68th)	The Late Late Show with James Corden	Rob Crabbe and Ben Winston, executive producers; Mike Gibbons, co-executive producers; Sheila Rogers, Michael Kaplan, Jeff Kopp and Josie Cliff, supervising producers; David Javerbaum, producer; James Corden, producer/host	CBS
2016 (68th)	Real Time with Bill Maher	Bill Maher, executive producer/host; Scott Carter, Sheila Griffiths, Brad Grey, Marc Gurvitz, Billy Martin and Dean E. Johnsen, executive producers; Chris Kelly, co-executive producer; Matt Wood, producer	HBO
2016 (68th)	The Tonight Show Starring Jimmy Fallon	Lorne Michaels, executive producer; Jamie Granet Bederman, Katie Hockmeyer, Jim Juvonen, Brian McDonald and Maria Pope, supervising producers; Gavin Purcell, producer; Josh Lieb, produced by; Jimmy Fallon, host	NBC
2017 (69th)
2017 (69th)	Last Week Tonight with John Oliver	John Oliver, executive producer/host; Tim Carvell and Liz Stanton, executive producers	HBO
2017 (69th)	Full Frontal with Samantha Bee	Samantha Bee, executive producer/host; Jo Miller, Jason Jones, Tony Hernandez and Miles Kahn, executive producers; Pat King, supervising producer; Alison Camillo and Kristen Everman, producers	TBS
2017 (69th)	Jimmy Kimmel Live!	Jimmy Kimmel, executive producer/host; Jill Leiderman, executive producer; Jason Schrift, Doug DeLuca, Erin Irwin and David Craig, co-executive producers; Gary Greenberg, Tony Romero and Jennifer Sharron, supervising producers; Ken Crosby, Molly McNearney, Seth Weidner and Josh Weintraub, producers	ABC
2017 (69th)	The Late Late Show with James Corden	Ben Winston and Rob Crabbe, executive producers; Amy Ozols, co-executive producer; Josie Cliff, Sheila Rogers, Michael Kaplan, James Longman and Jeff Kopp, supervising producers; James Corden, producer/host; Diana Miller, producer	CBS
2017 (69th)	The Late Show with Stephen Colbert	Stephen Colbert, executive producer/host; Chris Licht, Tom Purcell and Jon Stewart, executive producers; Barry Julien, co-executive producer; Denise Rehrig, Aaron Cohen, Paul Dinello, Matt Lappin, Opus Moreschi, Tanya Michnevich Bracco, Emily Gertler and Liz Levin, supervising producers; Paige Kendig and Jake Plunkett, producers	CBS
2017 (69th)	Real Time with Bill Maher	Bill Maher, executive producer/host; Scott Carter, Sheila Griffiths, Marc Gurvitz, Billy Martin, Dean E. Johnsen, executive producers; Chris Kelly, co-executive producer; Matt Wood, producer	HBO
2018 (70th)
2018 (70th)	Last Week Tonight with John Oliver	John Oliver, executive producer/host; Tim Carvell and Liz Stanton, executive producers	HBO
2018 (70th)	The Daily Show with Trevor Noah	Trevor Noah, executive producer/host; Steve Bodow, Jen Flanz and Jill Katz, Executive Producer; Justin Melkmann, co-executive producer; Max Browning, Eric Davies, Pamela DePace, Ramin Hedayati and Elise Terrell, supervising producers; Zhubin Parang and David Kibuuka, producers	Comedy Central
2018 (70th)	Full Frontal with Samantha Bee	Samantha Bee, executive producer/host; Jason Jones, Tony Hernandez, Miles Kahn, Alison Camillo and Pat King, executive producers; Allana Harkin and Chris Savage, producers	TBS
2018 (70th)	Jimmy Kimmel Live!	Jimmy Kimmel, executive producer/host; Jill Leiderman, executive producer; Jason Schrift, Doug DeLuca, Erin Irwin, David Craig and Jennifer Sharron, co-executive producers; Gary Greenberg and Tony Romero, supervising producers; Ken Crosby, Molly McNearney, Seth Weidner and Josh Weintraub, producers	ABC
2018 (70th)	The Late Late Show with James Corden	Ben Winston and Rob Crabbe, executive producers; Sheila Rogers, Michael Kaplan, Matt Roberts, James Longman, Josie Cliff and Jeff Kopp, supervising producers; James Corden, producer/host; Diana Miller, producer	CBS
2018 (70th)	The Late Show with Stephen Colbert	Stephen Colbert, executive producer/host; Chris Licht, Tom Purcell and Jon Stewart, executive producers; Barry Julien and Denise Rehrig, co-executive producers; Aaron Cohen, senior supervising producer; Tanya Michnevich Bracco, Paul Dinello, Emily Gertler, Matt Lappin and Opus Moreschi, supervising producers; Michael Brumm, Paige Kendig and Jake Plunkett, producers	CBS
2019 (71st)
2019 (71st)	Last Week Tonight with John Oliver	John Oliver, executive producer/host; Tim Carvell and Liz Stanton, executive producers; Jeremy Tchaban, supervising producer	HBO
2019 (71st)	The Daily Show with Trevor Noah	Trevor Noah, executive producer/host; Steve Bodow, Jen Flanz and Jill Katz, executive producers; Justin Melkmann, co-executive producer; David Kibuuka, Max Browning, Eric Davies, Pamela DePace, Ramin Hedayati and Elise Terrell, supervising producers; Jocelyn Conn and Zhubin Parang, producers	Comedy Central
2019 (71st)	Full Frontal with Samantha Bee	Samantha Bee, executive producer/host; Jason Jones, Tony Hernandez, Miles Kahn, Alison Camillo, Pat King and Melinda Taub, executive producers; Chris Savage, Allana Harkin and Kim Burdges; producers	TBS
2019 (71st)	Jimmy Kimmel Live!	Jimmy Kimmel, executive producer/host; Jill Leiderman, executive producer; Doug DeLuca, Erin Irwin, David Craig, Molly McNearney and Jennifer Sharron, co-executive producers; Gary Greenberg, Tony Romero and Josh Weintraub, supervising producers; Ken Crosby, Seth Weidner and Danny Ricker, producers	ABC
2019 (71st)	The Late Late Show with James Corden	Ben Winston and Rob Crabbe, executive producers; James Longman, co-executive producer; Sheila Rogers, Josie Cliff and Jeff Kopp, supervising producers; James Corden, producer/host; Diana Miller, producer	CBS
2019 (71st)	The Late Show with Stephen Colbert	Stephen Colbert, executive producer/host; Chris Licht, Tom Purcell and Jon Stewart, executive producers; Barry Julien and Denise Rehrig, co-executive producers; Tanya Michnevich Bracco, Paul Dinello, Matt Lappin, Opus Moreschi and Emily Gertler, supervising producers; Aaron Cohen, supervising producer/producer; Paige Kendig, Jake Plunkett, Michael Brumm and Bjoern Stejskal, producers	CBS

=== 2020s ===
Year	Program	Producers	Network
Outstanding Variety Talk Series
2020 (72nd)
2020 (72nd)	Last Week Tonight with John Oliver	John Oliver, Tim Carvell and Liz Stanton, executive producers; Jeremy Tchaban and Christopher Werner, supervising producers; Laura L. Griffin, Kate Mullaney, Matt Passet, Marian Wang and Charles Wilson, producers	HBO
2020 (72nd)	The Daily Show with Trevor Noah	Trevor Noah, executive producer/host; Jen Flanz and Jill Katz, executive producers; Justin Melkmann, co-executive producer; Max Browning, Eric Davies, Pamela DePace, Ramin Hedayati, David Kibuuka, Zhubin Parang, Elise Terrell and David Paul Meyer, supervising producers; Jocelyn Conn, Beth Shorr and Shawna Shepherd, producers	Comedy Central
2020 (72nd)	Full Frontal with Samantha Bee	Samantha Bee, executive producer/host; Jason Jones, Tony Hernandez, Alison Camillo, Miles Kahn and Pat King, executive producers; Allana Harkin, co-executive producer; Kim Burdges, Julia Fought, Chris Savage, Kristen Bartlett, Mike Drucker, Razan Ghalayini, Todd Bieber and Mike Rubens, producers	TBS
2020 (72nd)	Jimmy Kimmel Live!	Jimmy Kimmel, executive producer/host; Jill Leiderman, executive producer; Doug DeLuca, Erin Irwin, David Craig, Molly McNearney and Jennifer Sharron, co-executive producers; Gary Greenberg, Tony Romero, Josh Weintraub and Seth Weidner, supervising producers; Danny Ricker and Ken Crosby, producers	ABC
2020 (72nd)	The Late Show with Stephen Colbert	Stephen Colbert, executive producer/host; Chris Licht, Tom Purcell and Jon Stewart, executive producers; Barry Julien and Denise Rehrig, co-executive producers; Aaron Cohen, Matt Lappin, Tanya Michnevich Bracco, Paul Dinello, Emily Gertler, Jay Katsir, Opus Moreschi and Sara Vilkomerson, supervising producers; Jake Plunkett, Michael Brumm, Paige Kendig, Bjoern Stejskal and Adam Wager, producers	CBS
2021 (73rd)
2021 (73rd)	Last Week Tonight with John Oliver	John Oliver, executive producer/host; Tim Carvell and Liz Stanton, executive producers; Jeremy Tchaban, co-executive producer; Christopher Werner, supervising producer; Laura L. Griffin, Kate Mullaney, Catherine Owens, Matt Passet, Marian Wang and Charles Wilson, producers	HBO
2021 (73rd)	Conan	Conan O'Brien, executive producer/host; Jeff Ross, executive producer; Frank Smiley, Rachel Witlieb Bernstein and J.P. Buck, supervising producers; Tracy King, Mike Sweeney and Matt O'Brien, producers	TBS
2021 (73rd)	The Daily Show with Trevor Noah	Trevor Noah, executive producer/host; Jen Flanz and Jill Katz, executive producers; Justin Melkmann, co-executive producer; Max Browning, Eric Davies, Pamela DePace, Ramin Hedayati, David Kibuuka, David Paul Meyer, Zhubin Parang and Elise Terrell, supervising producers; Dan Amira, Jocelyn Conn, Jeff Gussow, Shawna Shepherd and Beth Shorr, producers	Comedy Central
2021 (73rd)	Jimmy Kimmel Live!	Jimmy Kimmel, executive producer/host; Doug DeLuca, Erin Irwin, David Craig, Molly McNearney and Jennifer Sharron, co-executive producers; Gary Greenberg, Tony Romero, Josh Weintraub and Seth Weidner, supervising producers; Danny Ricker, Ken Crosby and Josh Halloway, producers	ABC
2021 (73rd)	The Late Show with Stephen Colbert	Stephen T. Colbert, executive producer/host; Chris Licht, Tom Purcell and Jon Stewart, executive producers; Tanya Michnevich Bracco, Barry Julien, Opus Moreschi and Denise Rehrig, co-executive producers; Aaron Cohen, Paul Dinello, Emily Gertler, Jay Katsir, Matt Lappin, Bjoern Stejskal and Sara Vilkomerson, supervising producers; Ballard C. Boyd, Michael Brumm, Gabe Gronli, Paige Kendig, Jake Plunkett and Adam Wager, producers	CBS
2022 (74th)
2022 (74th)	Last Week Tonight with John Oliver	John Oliver, Tim Carvell and Liz Stanton, executive producers; Jeremy Tchaban, co-executive producer; Catherine Owens and Christopher Werner, supervising producers; Laura L. Griffin, Kate Mullaney, Matt Passet, Marian Wang and Charles Wilson, producers	HBO
2022 (74th)	The Daily Show with Trevor Noah	Trevor Noah, Jen Flanz and Jill Katz, executive producers; Justin Melkmann, co-executive producer; Ian Berger, Max Browning, Pamela DePace, Ramin Hedayati, David Kibuuka, David Paul Meyer, Zhubin Parang and Elise Terrell, supervising producers; Dan Amira, Jocelyn Conn, Jeff Gussow, Brittany Radocha, Shawna Shepherd and Beth Shorr, producers	Comedy Central
2022 (74th)	Jimmy Kimmel Live!	Jimmy Kimmel, executive producer/host; Erin Irwin, David Craig, Molly McNearney and Jennifer Sharron, executive producers; Doug DeLuca, co-executive producer; Gary Greenberg, Tony Romero, Josh Weintraub, Seth Weidner and Danny Ricker, supervising producers; Ken Crosby, Josh Halloway, Patrick Friend, Nancy Fowkes and Craig Powell, producers	ABC
2022 (74th)	Late Night with Seth Meyers	Lorne Michaels, executive producer; Sal Gentile, Sarah Jenks-Daly, Henry Melcher and Kevin Miller, supervising producers; Alex Baze, Hillary Hunn, Eric Leiderman, Haleigh Raff and Jen Sochko, producers; Mike Shoemaker, produced by; Seth Meyers, host	NBC
2022 (74th)	The Late Show with Stephen Colbert	Stephen T. Colbert, Chris Licht, Tom Purcell and Jon Stewart, executive producers; Tanya Michnevich Bracco, Barry Julien, Opus Moreschi and Denise Rehrig, co-executive producers; Aaron Cohen, Paul Dinello, Emily Gertler, Jay Katsir, Matt Lappin, Bjoern Stejskal and Sara Vilkomerson, supervising producers; Michael Brumm, Paige Kendig, Jake Plunkett, Jon Batiste, Ballard C. Boyd, Ariel Dumas, Adam Wager and Gabe Gronli, producers	CBS
Outstanding Talk Series
2023 (75th)
2023 (75th)	The Daily Show with Trevor Noah	Trevor Noah, executive producer/host; Jen Flanz and Jill Katz, executive producers; Justin Melkmann, co-executive producer; Ian Berger, Max Browning, Pamela DePace, Ramin Hedayati, David Kibuuka, David Paul Meyer, Zhubin Parang and Elise Terrell, supervising producers; Dan Amira, Jocelyn Conn, Jeff Gussow, Brittany Radocha, Shawna Shepherd and Beth Shorr, producers	Comedy Central
2023 (75th)	Jimmy Kimmel Live!	Jimmy Kimmel, executive producer/host; Erin Irwin, David Craig, Molly McNearney and Jennifer Sharron, executive producers; Doug DeLuca, co-executive producer; Gary Greenberg, Tony Romero, Josh Weintraub, Seth Weidner, Danny Ricker and Rory Albanese, supervising producers; Ken Crosby, Josh Halloway, Patrick Friend, Nancy Fowkes and Craig Powell, producers	ABC
2023 (75th)	Late Night with Seth Meyers	Lorne Michaels, executive producer; Emily Erotas, Sarah Jenks-Daly, Henry Melcher and Kevin Miller, supervising producers; Alex Baze, Sal Gentile, Hillary Hunn, Eric Leiderman, Haleigh Raff and Jen Sochko, producers; Mike Shoemaker, produced by; Seth Meyers, host	NBC
2023 (75th)	The Late Show with Stephen Colbert	Stephen T. Colbert, executive producer/host; Tom Purcell and Jon Stewart, executive producers; Tanya Michnevich Bracco, Barry Julien, Matt Lappin, Opus Moreschi and Denise Rehrig, co-executive producers; Aaron Cohen, Paul Dinello, Ariel Dumas, Emily Gertler, Jay Katsir, Bjoern Stejskal and Sara Vilkomerson, supervising producers; Ballard C. Boyd, Michael Brumm, Megan Gearheart, Gabe Gronli, Paige Kendig, Jake Plunkett and Adam Wager, producers; Louis J. Grieci, line producer	CBS
2023 (75th)	The Problem with Jon Stewart	Jon Stewart, executive producer/host; Brinda Adhikari, James Dixon and Richard Plepler, executive producers; Chris McShane, co-executive producer; Lorrie Baranek and Reza Riazi, supervising producers; Caity Gray, producer; Dan Glantz, line producer	Apple TV+
2024 (76th)
2024 (76th)	The Daily Show	Jon Stewart, executive producer/host; Jen Flanz and James "Baby Doll" Dixon, executive producers; Ramin Hedayati, Justin Melkmann and Zhubin Parang, co-executive producers; Ian Berger, Max Browning, Pamela DePace, David Kibuuka, David Paul Meyer, Elise Terrell and Sushil Dayal, supervising producers; Dan Amira, Jocelyn Conn, Jeff Gussow, Brittany Radocha, Shawna Shepherd and Beth Shorr, producers; Ronny Chieng, Jordan Klepper, Michael Kosta, Desi Lydic and Dulcé Sloan, hosts	Comedy Central
2024 (76th)	Jimmy Kimmel Live!	Jimmy Kimmel, Erin Irwin, David Craig, Molly McNearney and Jennifer Sharron, executive producers; Doug DeLuca, co-executive producer; Gary Greenberg, Tony Romero, Josh Weintraub, Seth Weidner, Danny Ricker, Rory Albanese and Josh Halloway, supervising producers; Ken Crosby, Patrick Friend, Nancy Fowkes and Craig Powell, producers	ABC
2024 (76th)	Late Night with Seth Meyers	Lorne Michaels, executive producer; Emily Erotas, Sarah Jenks-Daly, Henry Melcher, Kevin Miller and Jeremiah Silva, supervising producers; Alex Baze, Sal Gentile, Hillary Hunn, Eric Leiderman, Haleigh Raff and Jen Sochko, producers; Mike Shoemaker, produced by; Seth Meyers, host	NBC
2024 (76th)	The Late Show with Stephen Colbert	Stephen T. Colbert, Tom Purcell and Jon Stewart, executive producers; Tanya Michnevich Bracco, Barry Julien, Matt Lappin, Opus Moreschi and Denise Rehrig, co-executive producers; Aaron Cohen, Paul Dinello, Ariel Dumas, Emily Gertler, Jay Katsir, Bjoern Stejskal and Sara Vilkomerson, supervising producers; Ballard C. Boyd, Michael Brumm, Megan Gearheart, Gabe Gronli, Paige Kendig, Jake Plunkett and Adam Wager, producers; Louis J. Grieci, line producer	CBS
2025 (77th)
2025 (77th)	The Late Show with Stephen Colbert	Stephen T. Colbert, Tom Purcell and Jon Stewart, executive producers; Tanya Michnevich Bracco, Barry Julien, Matt Lappin and Opus Moreschi, co-executive producers; Aaron Cohen, Paul Dinello, Ariel Dumas, Emily Gertler, Jay Katsir, Bjoern Stejskal and Sara Vilkomerson, supervising producers; Ballard C. Boyd, Michael Brumm, Megan Gearheart, Gabe Gronli, Paige Kendig, Jake Plunkett and Adam Wager, producers; Lou Grieci, line producer	CBS
2025 (77th)	The Daily Show	Jon Stewart, executive producer/host; Jen Flanz and James "Baby Doll" Dixon, executive producers; Ramin Hedayati, Justin Melkmann, Zhubin Parang and Elise Terrell, co-executive producers; Dan Amira, Ian Berger, Max Browning, Sushil Dayal, Pamela DePace, David Kibuuka and David Paul Meyer, supervising producers; Jocelyn Conn, Jeff Gussow, Matt O'Brien, Brittany Radocha, Daniel Radosh, Shawna Shepherd, Beth Shorr and Fiona Wozniak, producers; Ronny Chieng, Jordan Klepper, Michael Kosta and Desi Lydic, hosts	Comedy Central
2025 (77th)	Jimmy Kimmel Live!	Jimmy Kimmel, executive producer/host; Erin Irwin, Jennifer Sharron, Molly McNearney and David Craig, executive producers; Douglas DeLuca and Danny Ricker, co-executive producers; Gary Greenberg, Rory Albanese, Tony Romero, Seth Weidner, Josh Weintraub and Josh Halloway, supervising producers; Ken Crosby, Craig Powell, Nancy Fowkes and Patrick Friend, producers; Matt Musgrave, line producer	ABC

== Programs with multiple wins ==
Totals include wins for Outstanding Variety Series.

11 wins

- The Daily Show with Jon Stewart

10 wins

- Last Week Tonight with John Oliver (Note: Total includes Last Week Tonight with John Oliver's wins for Outstanding Scripted Variety Series)

6 wins

- Late Show with David Letterman

2 wins

- The Colbert Report

== Programs with multiple nominations ==
Totals include nominations for Outstanding Variety Series.

17 nominations

- Late Show with David Letterman

15 nominations

- The Daily Show with Jon Stewart

13 nominations

- Jimmy Kimmel Live!

12 nominations

- Last Week Tonight with John Oliver
- Real Time with Bill Maher

10 nominations

- The Colbert Report

9 nominations

- The Late Show with Stephen Colbert

6 nominations

- The Daily Show with Trevor Noah

4 nominations

- Full Frontal with Samantha Bee
- The Late Late Show with James Corden

3 nominations

- The Tonight Show Starring Jimmy Fallon
- Late Night with Seth Meyers

2 nominations

- Conan

== Total wins by network ==
- HBO – 7
- Comedy Central – 3
- CBS – 1

== See also ==
- Critics' Choice Television Award for Best Talk Show
- Daytime Emmy Award for Outstanding Talk Show
