= Earth (The Book) =

2010 humor book by Jon Stewart

Earth (The Book) A Visitor's Guide to the Human Race
- Author: Jon Stewart; David Javerbaum; Rory Albanese; Steve Bodow; Josh Lieb with Kevin Bleyer; Rich Blomquist; Tim Carvell; Wyatt Cenac; Hallie Haglund; J. R. Havlan; Elliott Kalan; Sam Means; Jo Miller; John Oliver; Daniel Radosh; Jason Ross
- Language: English
- Genre: Humor
- Publisher: Grand Central Publishing
- Publication date: September 2010
- Publication place: United States
- Pages: 256
- ISBN: 0-446-57922-X
- Preceded by: America (The Book): A Citizen's Guide to Democracy Inaction

Earth (The Book): A Visitor's Guide to the Human Race is a 2010 humor book written by Jon Stewart and other writers of The Daily Show. It is also a sequel to America (The Book).

== Synopsis ==
Written in the past tense, the book's stated purpose is to serve as a Baedeker travel guide for an alien civilization that discovers Earth after humanity has died out, most likely by its own hands. As such, Earth (The Book) attempts to chronicle the history of the planet and the human race from the beginning to the present day, and also tries to explain human concepts and emotions such as "love" and "work" for its alien readers.

The book follows a similar format to America (The Book), being written in the style of a textbook and featuring many images, including visual gags. One controversial visual gag in America was a doctored image of the United States Supreme Court justices nude; a similar gag appeared in Earth which was an illustration of human anatomy that featured a nude man, one half of the man depicting Larry King.

== Table of contents ==
- To Our Alien Readers
- To Our Human Readers
- Ch. 1: Earth
- Ch. 2: Life
- Ch. 3: Man
- Ch. 4: The Life Cycle
- Ch. 5: Society
- Ch. 6: Commerce
- Ch. 7: Religion
- Ch. 8: Science
- Ch. 9: Culture
- Afterword
- Appendix A: Final Scores
- Appendix B: Why We're Not Here
- Appendix C: What We Left Out
- Acknowledgments
- Credits

== Reception ==
Keith Staskiewicz of Entertainment Weekly gave the book an A−, praising it as "The Devil's Dictionary for a new generation" and concludes that the book's humor and writing style might lead the reader to conclude that "this would actually be a fairly comprehensive guide for extraterrestrial visitors", adding "just so long as they have a sense of humor".

As of December 5, 2010, Earth (The Book) had spent 10 weeks on The New York Times Best Seller list; for four weeks it was number one on the Hardcover Nonfiction list.

On February 13, 2011, Earth (The Book) was awarded a Grammy at the 2011 53rd Annual Grammy Awards for Best Spoken Word Album.

== See also ==
- America (The Book)
- I Am America (And So Can You!)
- I Am a Pole (And So Can You!)
- America Again: Re-becoming The Greatness We Never Weren't
