= Sara Benincasa =

American comedian and author

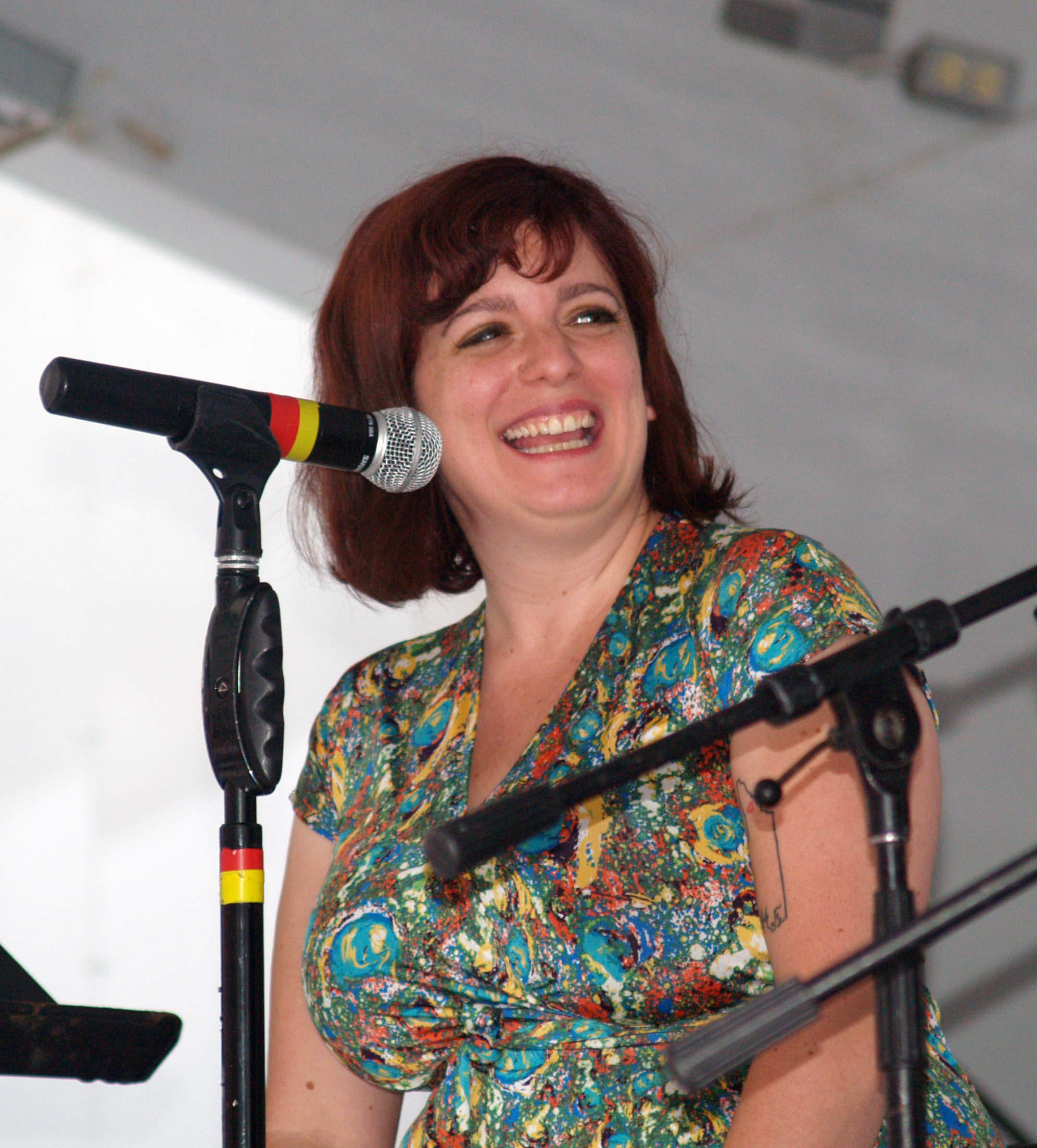
- Benincasa moderating the "Comedians as Authors" panel at the 2014 Brooklyn Book Festival
- Education: Warren Wilson College; Columbia University (MA)
- Occupations: Writer, comedian
- Years active: 2008—present

Sara Benincasa is an American comedian and author.

== Biography ==
Benincasa has a degree in creative writing from Warren Wilson College in Asheville, North Carolina. She has an M.A. in Secondary School Education from Teachers College, Columbia University.

After graduation, Benincasa taught with AmeriCorps in Texas.

Benincasa was a citizen journalist for MTV covering the 2008 United States presidential election as part of MTV's 2008 Emmy Award-winning Think campaign.

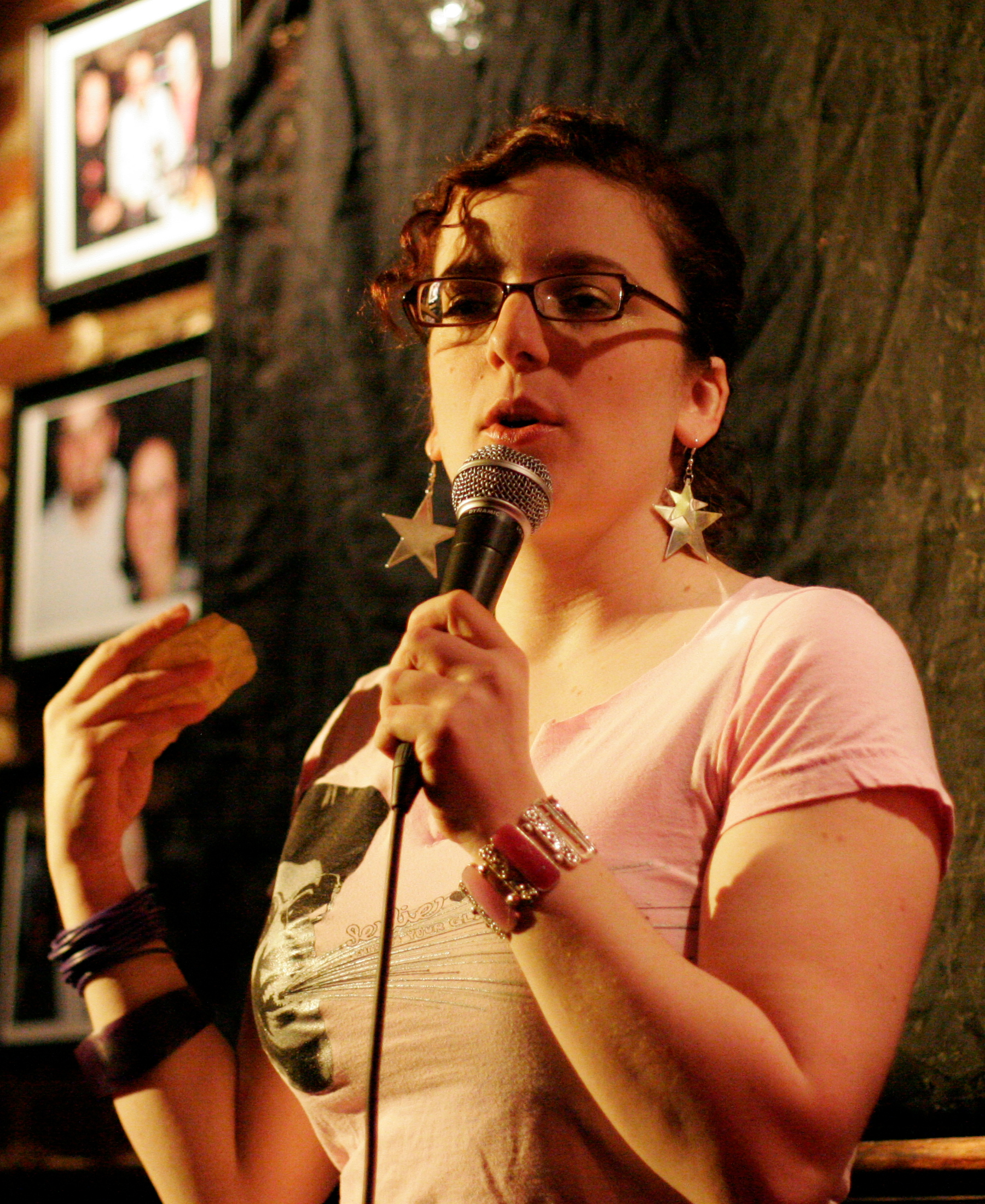
Benincasa in 2007

Benincasa was featured on Nerve.com's BlogALog as a comedic blogger. Her last post on the SJ1000 blog was April 1, 2008, in which she suggested that followers missing her Internet presence go to her official website, her Myspace page, her MTV Think profile, or her blog.

Along with her blog, Benincasa filmed a series of interviews titled Tub Talk with Sara B. The series featured Benincasa in a bathtub with various comedic personalities, including Reggie Watts, Jonathan Ames, and Andy Borowitz. Benincasa has since revamped the web series on her YouTube account as Gettin' Wet with Sara Benincasa. Interviewees include Margaret Cho, Donald Glover, Neil Gaiman, Amanda Palmer, and James Urbaniak. She has also contributed to the web site Jezebel.

In September 2008, Benincasa began producing a vlog in which she parodies the role of Republican vice-presidential candidate Sarah Palin. She is particularly attentive to Palin's Midwestern accent. These vlogs were uploaded to Benincasa's YouTube profile until a partnership with Huffington Post's humor site 23/6 was established, and the vlogs were moved to the twentythreesix YouTube page.

In 2009, Benincasa developed a one-woman show about her experiences with agoraphobia and panic attacks. She has since sold the literary rights to Agorafabulous! to William Morrow, a division of HarperCollins.

Benincasa co-hosted the Cosmo Radio sex/relationship talk show Get in Bed on Sirius XM Satellite Radio until September 2010. She next started a podcast with Marcus Parks, called "Sex and Other Human Activities", which features a sex questions segment (using questions sent via email and Formspring); this launched in February 2011. The episode which aired on September 19, 2012, entitled "End of an Era", is described as "Sara's final show on the old SAOHA".

In January 2018, Benincasa offered $300 to any journalist who asked President Trump about America's relations with the fictitious African nation of Wakanda, the home of Marvel's Black Panther. Her Afro-futurism tweet went viral.

On October 10, 2019, she was featured in a 30-minute YouTube documentary created by SoulPancake in collaboration with Funny or Die. A variety of comedians discuss mental health called Laughing Matters.

== Books ==
=== Fiction ===
- Great, New York:: HarperTeen, 2014, ISBN 9780062222695
- DC Trip, Culver City, California: Adaptive Books, 2015, ISBN 9780996066631
- Tim Kaine Is Your Nice Dad: A Work of Dad Fiction, 2016

=== Nonfiction ===
- Agorafabulous!: Dispatches from My Bedroom, New York: William Morrow, 2012, ISBN 9780062024411
- Real Artists Have Day Jobs (And Other Awesome Things They Don't Teach You In School), New York: William Morrow, 2016, ISBN 9780062369819
