= Radosh =

Radosh is a surname. Notable people with the surname include:

- Ronald Radosh (born 1937), American writer, professor and historian
- Daniel Radosh (born 1969), American journalist and blogger, son of Ronald
