= Just Add Water (improv troupe) =

Yale University student comedy group

Just Add Water logo

Just Add Water, sometimes abbreviated as JAW (pronounced "jaw"), is an improvisational comedy troupe at Yale University in New Haven, Connecticut. Just Add Water plays both short-form and long-form games and makes frequent use of music in its performances. The group is completely student run and directed, and is also known for wearing brightly colored jumpsuits as performance uniforms. It currently has fourteen members, and is directed by Isabel Tiburcio.

== History ==
Just Add Water was founded in 1986, joining the Ex!t Players, The Purple Crayon, and The Viola Question. The group was allegedly formed when flyers appeared around campus soliciting interested students and the time and location of a first meeting; no one claimed credit for posting the flyers at the time, and attendees at the meeting were met only with the phrase "Do you just add water?" written on the blackboard. Jumpsuits were introduced as official uniforms in the mid-1990s. JAW has performed widely across the United States, including at The Second City in Chicago, making JAW the first collegiate improv group to be invited to perform there. Membership has historically numbered between 12 and 15, usually undergraduates. Members join the group as freshmen (as sophomores on occasion) and remain with the group until graduation.

== Performance ==
Just Add Water in performance

JAW is known for incorporating music into its performance, improvising songs and raps in many of its games. To facilitate musical performances, JAW has included a pianist on its roster in addition to regular players since its founding. Shows generally feature a combination of short- and long-form games, culminating in a large-scale improvised musical.

== Notable alumni ==
- Steve Bodow, executive producer and former head writer for The Daily Show with Jon Stewart
- Jo Miller, former writer for The Daily Show with Jon Stewart and showrunner and executive producer of Full Frontal with Samantha Bee
- Maia Brewton, actress
- Austan Goolsbee, Robert P. Gwinn Professor of Economics at The University of Chicago's Booth School of Business and former Chairman of the Council of Economic Advisors
- Allison Williams, actress
- Kobi Libii, actor and director
- Anna Lembke, psychiatrist and New York Times bestselling author
- Kemper Lowry
- Misan Oseragbaje
- Rishika Veeramachaneni
- Hannah Lothian
- David Deruiter
