= Rapture Ready! =

Book about Christian pop culture

Rapture Ready!: Adventures in the Parallel Universe of Christian Pop Culture is a book about Christian pop culture written by Daniel Radosh.

== Background ==
Christians have created their own pop culture, which is what Radosh explores in the book. Radosh starts the book by exploring the souveirs and tchotchkes of Christian pop culture. While exploring Christian pop culture, Radosh also encounters controversial topics such as creationism and abstinence-only sex education. Radosh attended a Christian rock festival in 2005, which led him to explore Christian pop culture and eventually write the book. Radosh is a humanistic Jew. Radosh critiques Christian pop culture in the book without being condescending. Radosh created a list of his ten favorite Christian rock songs after publishing the book. The book points to mewithoutYou as an example of a good Christian rock band.
