= Jen Flanz =

American executive producer and showrunner

- Born: 1975 or 1976 (age 50–51)
- Education: Binghamton University
- Occupations: Showrunner, executive producer
- Organization: The Daily Show

Jen Flanz is an American showrunner best known for her work for The Daily Show, which she has worked for since 1998. She has been an executive producer of the show since 2014, and since 2018, she has worked as the show's showrunner. She has received 32 Emmy nominations and has won 11 Emmy awards.

== Biography ==
She grew up in Rockland County, New York and attended Binghamton University's Harpur College. She initially intended to become an attorney, but decided against it partially due to the murder trial of O. J. Simpson, and shifted towards working in television. She graduated one semester early, and subsequently, in 1998, began as a production assistant at The Daily Show. She skipped her graduation ceremony due to "taking her job so seriously".

She subsequently rose up the ranks, after taking a few months to work at Nickelodeon and returning as a coordinating producer. She became executive producer of the show in 2014 and showrunner in 2018. She helped to select Trevor Noah as host in 2015 and led the transition. She also helped to select the network of rotating guest hosts in 2022, and led the team to invite Jon Stewart, who she's described as a mentor, back to the show.

She led the show through COVID-19, where she described her focus as being "how we were going to keep our staff safe... one way we could do that was giving everyone something to do and something to do is make a show together". She has stated that the current iteration of the show is "refreshing" for her as a writer and producer, due to the "different voices". In 2025, she shifted the rating of the show to TV-MA for one night to permit Jon Stewart to swear repeatedly.

She has also served as executive producer of the spinoff shows The Daily Show: Desi Lydic Foxsplains and The Daily Show Presents: Jordan Klepper Fingers The Pulse, and also served as one of the writers for the latter show. She has worked on graphics for the shows, and describes one of her keys to success as her "eye for talent".

She has received 32 Emmy nominations and has received 11 Emmy awards. Most are in her role as executive producer, but she received the Primetime Emmy Award for Outstanding Writing for a Nonfiction Program in 2025 for her role as writer for Jordan Klepper Fingers The Pulse. She has received 4 Emmy nominations in 2026, including one as writer. She has also received Peabody Awards and a Television Academy Honors Award. She gave a short speech after being pulled to the microphone by Stewart when The Daily Show won the Primetime Emmy Award for Outstanding Talk Series in 2024.

== Personal life ==
She resides in the East Side of Manhattan with her dog, and spends time with her partner and his two children. She was previously married once and divorced. She is in remission from Hodgkin lymphoma.
