= J. R. Havlan =

J. R. Havlan is a former writer for The Daily Show, where he won eight Emmys for Writing for a Variety, Music or Comedy Program. J.R. was a writer for America: The Book and Earth: The Book.
