= Madeleine Smithberg =

American television producer

Madeleine Smithberg (born September 23, 1959) is an American Emmy and Peabody award-winning TV producer best known for her work on The Daily Show for Comedy Central, which she co-created with Lizz Winstead and ran for 7 years. As Executive Producer she is credited for many of The Daily Show's notable casting choices including Jon Stewart, Stephen Colbert, Mo Rocca, and Steve Carell. Prior to her work on The Daily Show she spent 6 years as a producer at Late Night with David Letterman.

== Early life ==
Smithberg is originally from New York City and graduated from Binghamton University.

== Career ==
Smithberg began her career as a producer at RAI, Italian national television. After this she obtained a role at Late Night with David Letterman, working her way up from coordinator to producer, where she was responsible for booking human-interest guests.

Smithberg and Winstead were developing a Larry Sanders-type show at Comedy Central when the then-president of the network, Doug Herzog, asked them to pivot and work on a daily show to replace Politically Incorrect, which was leaving the network and moving to ABC. She is credited with creating the long-running "Moment of Zen" segment, which she says was inspired by her cat.

In 2024, she announced she was working on a memoir about her time in comedy. It is slated to be published March 2, 2027 by Regalo Press, an imprint of Post Hill Press.

== Awards ==
- 2000 The Daily Show with Jon Stewart: Indecision 2000
- 2003 Prime Time Emmy Outstanding Variety, Music, or Comedy Series
