= Comedy 23/6 =

Satirical news website

HuffPost Comedy
- Website type: News
- Available in: English
- Owners: Comedy News Ventures, Inc. HuffPost
- Website: Official Webpage
- Commercial: Free with advertisements
- Registration: Optional
- Launched: November 9, 2007; 18 years ago
- Current status: Defunct

Comedy 23/6 was a satirical news and opinion website developed by HuffPost and Barry Diller's IAC launched on November 9, 2007.

== Overview ==
The executive in charge of production was former BBC and Channel 4 exec Michael Jackson. Published by Arianna Huffington and edited initially by Ben Wikler, and later by former The Daily Show writer Jason Reich, the site featured daily news coverage, original video, and a group blog known as "The Room."

Bloggers for the site have included Bill Maher, Tracey Ullman, Mike Birbiglia, Taylor Negron, Greg Fitzsimmons, and Paula Poundstone.

== Writers ==
Brian Spinks was head of video programming and development, producing video with New York comedians and writers Eugene Mirman, H. Jon Benjamin, Jon Glaser, David Rees, A.D. Miles, Patrick Borelli, Julie Klausner, Jenny Slate, Larry Murphy, Max Silvestri, John Mulaney, Todd Barry, Joe Mande and Sam Seder.
