= Jason Reich =

American television writer

Jason Reich (born March 11, 1976, in Wantagh, New York) is an American television writer who has won four Emmy Awards (out of five nominations) for his work on The Daily Show, for which he wrote from 2002 to 2007. He was also one of the writers of America (The Book). An established sketch comedy actor, he is occasionally seen in the background of skits on the show. Reich has been a member of numerous comedy troupes, including the Skits-O-Phrenics of Cornell University (from which he graduated in 1998 with a degree in communications), Three Jews And A Persian, and Plants Need Water. He was also a one-time contributor to Wholphin. He was a 1997 IRTS (International Radio and Television Society) fellow. He is a brother of the Beta Chapter of the Alpha Epsilon Pi fraternity. He left The Daily Show in 2007 to work on a start up comedy internet site owned by The Huffington Post, 236.com.

Reich also wrote for The Faster Times about video games.

In 2016, Reich was one of the writers of Full Frontal with Samantha Bee. Beginning in summer of 2017, he is one of the executive producers and the head writer of Jim Jefferies' new weekly late night series on Comedy Central.
