= America (The Book) =

2004 humor book by Jon Stewart

America (The Book) A Citizen's Guide to Democracy Inaction
- Author: Jon Stewart; Ben Karlin; David Javerbaum with Samantha Bee; Rich Blomquist; Steve Bodow; Tim Carvell; Stephen Colbert; Rob Corddry; Eric Drysdale; Ed Helms; Chris Regan; Brendan Hay; Jason Ross
- Language: English
- Genre: Humor
- Publisher: Warner Books
- Publication date: September 2004
- Publication place: United States
- Pages: 227
- ISBN: 0-446-53268-1
- OCLC: 56479080
- Dewey Decimal: 818/.5407 22
- LC Class: PN6231.P6 S84 2004
- Followed by: America (the Book) Teacher's Edition: A Citizen's Guide to Democracy Inaction

America (the Book) Teacher's Edition: A Citizen's Guide to Democracy Inaction
- Author: Jon Stewart; Ben Karlin; David Javerbaum with Samantha Bee; Rich Blomquist; Steve Bodow; Tim Carvell; Stephen Colbert; Rob Corddry; Eric Drysdale; Ed Helms; Chris Regan; Brendan Hay; Stanley K. Schultz
- Language: English
- Genre: Humor
- Publisher: Warner Books
- Publication date: September 2006
- Publication place: United States
- Media type: Trade paperback
- Pages: 227
- ISBN: 0-446-69186-0
- Preceded by: America (The Book): A Citizen's Guide to Democracy Inaction
- Followed by: Earth (The Book): A Visitor’s Guide to the Human Race

America (The Book): A Citizen's Guide to Democracy Inaction is a 2004 humor book written by Jon Stewart and other writers of The Daily Show that parodies and satirizes American politics and worldview. It has won several awards, and generated some controversy.

An updated trade paperback edition was published in 2006 as a "Teacher's Edition", with updated coverage of the Supreme Court Justices (including Samuel Alito and John Roberts, who were appointed after the 2004 book's publication), and fact checking by Stanley K. Schultz, professor emeritus of history at the University of Wisconsin–Madison, with red marks and remarks appearing throughout, correcting the satirical "mistakes" (and a few honest errors) of the original edition.

== Description ==
America (The Book) was written and edited by Jon Stewart, Ben Karlin, David Javerbaum, and other writers of The Daily Show. Karlin was the show's executive producer and Javerbaum its head writer. The book is written as a parody of a United States high school civics textbook, complete with study guides, questions, and class exercises. Also included are scholarly "Were You Aware?" boxes, one of which explains that "the term 'Did You Know' is copyrighted by a rival publisher". The book provides discussion questions to mock history study guide books, with ridiculous questions such as: "Would you rather be a king or slave? Why or why not?" It pokes fun at the American political system, and includes a chapter caricaturing stereotypical American views of the rest of the world.

People affiliated with The Daily Show during publication in 2004, such as Stephen Colbert, Samantha Bee, and Ed Helms, contributed small articles. Bee's articles related the "Canadian view point" on topics, such as "We have media in Canada, too!" Stephen Colbert gives heavily biased viewpoints on topics such as Warren G. Harding (who is often considered one of the worst American presidents).

One page contains mock campaign stickers for various candidates. These include "Lifelong Democrat Retired Palm Beach Jews for Buchanan" (referencing the butterfly ballot fracas that brought about the 2000 recount in Florida), "I cast my five slaves' three votes for James K. Polk" and "Undecided Voters for Candidate". Another has "Humphrey in '68" in large print, then in much smaller print "Because otherwise, in four years, Nixon's boys will be caught breaking into the Watergate office trying to sabotage their opponents, creating unprecedented scandal and ushering in an era of cynicism that will shape politics for decades to come. Call it a hunch. So, to repeat: Humphrey in '68".

Appearing shortly before the 2004 United States presidential election, the book originally included several pages of an "Election Guide" making fun of both candidates. Printings of the book made after the election do not have this insert.

Publishers Weekly (PW) chose it as its "Book of the Year"; it noted that "in a year defined by political polemics, it seems fitting that PW's Book of the Year be one in which the authors survey the entire political system and laugh." The audiobook version won the Grammy Award in 2005 for "Best Comedy Album." The book, published in September 2004, remained a bestseller even after the election. In addition to America (The Audiobook), it has also spun off into America (The Calendar).

== Controversy ==
The fifth chapter contains obviously doctored photographs with the heads of then-current U.S. Supreme Court justices superimposed on appropriately aged naked bodies (Page 98–99). An adjacent page invites the reader to cover each justice with a cutout of his or her robe to "restore their dignity". Wal-Mart canceled its order for America (The Book) because it "felt a majority of our customers would not be comfortable with the image". Some Mississippi public libraries removed the book from their shelves, but the ban was lifted the next day, after the library board had received numerous complaints.

Cartoonist Bruce Tinsley objected to the book's parody of his comic strip Mallard Fillmore, which appears among six other cartoon parodies, captioned as dating from 1998. Tinsley referenced the parody in the July 5–8, 2005 editions of Fillmore, with the title character stating that Jon Stewart "tried to deceive people into thinking" that the book's phony Fillmore was real. The strip went on to imply that Stewart was a pedophile. Stewart responded in the Teacher's Edition by having Schultz note that although it is not a real Mallard Fillmore strip, it shows about the same level of humor as Tinsley.

== Table of contents ==
- Study Guide
- Foreword: by Thomas Jefferson
- Ch. 1: Democracy Before America
- Ch. 2: The Founding of America
- Ch. 3: The President: King of Democracy
- Ch. 4: Congress: Quagmire of Freedom
- Ch. 5: The Judicial Branch: It Rules
- Ch. 6: Campaigns and Elections: America Changes the Sheets
- Ch. 7: The Media: Democracy's Guardian Angels (retitled two pages later as "The Media: Democracy's Valiant Vulgarians")
- Ch. 8: The Future of Democracy: Four Score and Seven Years from Now
- Ch. 9: The Rest of the World: International House of Horrors
- Afterword
- Acknowledgments
- Credits
- Election 2004 (unlisted bonus section, not included in post-election printings)

== Cultural impact ==
Denise Dresser and Jorge Volpi co-wrote Mexico, lo que todo ciudadano quisiera (no) saber de su patria ("Mexico, what every citizen would [not] like to know about his fatherland"). The book is heavily based on Stewart's book. Jon Stewart is thanked in the book "for giving the authors the idea".

The book appears in the background of a bookstore scene of the film Mr. Woodcock.

== See also ==
- Earth (The Book)
- I Am America (And So Can You!)
- I Am a Pole (And So Can You!)
- America Again: Re-becoming The Greatness We Never Weren't
