= Ben Karlin =

American television producer and writer

- Born: Benjamin Miles Karlin; 1971 (age 54–55); Needham, Massachusetts, U.S.
- Education: University of Wisconsin-Madison (BA)
- Years active: 1993–present
- Spouse: Paola Guastini (m. 2006; div. 2012)
- Children: 1

Benjamin Miles Karlin (born c. 1971) is an American television producer and writer. He has won eight Emmy awards, and is best known for his work on The Daily Show with Jon Stewart and The Colbert Report. He is one of three co-creators of The Colbert Report along with Stephen Colbert and Jon Stewart. Karlin left Comedy Central in December 2006. He has also been a writer for TV show Modern Family.

Karlin was tapped to serve as writer, producer and showrunner of a new TV series set within the Marvel Cinematic Universe titled Marvel's Damage Control, based on the Marvel Comics' team with the same name. The series was ordered by ABC Network for consideration in 2017, but not picked up.

His book, released in February 2008, is a collection of essays entitled Things I've Learned From Women Who've Dumped Me. It contains essays by Andy Richter, Will Forte, David Wain, Stephen Colbert, Patton Oswalt, Bob Odenkirk, and many others. Karlin is also the co-editor of America (The Book) alongside Jon Stewart and David Javerbaum. He wrote for Space Ghost: Coast to Coast and The Onion from 1993 to 1996.

== Early life ==
Karlin was born and raised in Needham, Massachusetts. His father worked as an advertising executive for Dunkin' Donuts until he moved to the upholstery business. He attended Needham High School, graduating in 1989. Upon graduation, Karlin's goal was to attend the University of Michigan but he did not get in. In 1989 he moved to Madison, and enrolled at the University of Wisconsin–Madison, where he majored in history with the intent of becoming a journalist. Karlin served as a columnist and sportswriter for The Daily Cardinal, which led him to work as a reporter, covering the 1992 Summer Olympics in Barcelona for United Press International.

Following some of his friends from the Cardinal, he joined The Onion in 1993 as a writer, where he would get paid $5 for a list of 10 ideas and $20 for a published piece. In 1995 he became the paper's chief editor until his departure from the publication in 1996.

== Career ==
=== 1996–1999: Early career in comedy ===
Karlin left The Onion to join some of the paper former writers in Los Angeles. There they formed a writing team, and by fall they had a pilot order from Fox to make a show based on their work at The Onion, called Deadline: Now. The show did not go into production. Karlin wrote several episodes of Adult Swim's Space Ghost: Coast to Coast between 1997 and 1998. He also worked as a script doctor for movies, including Ice Age, Monkeybone and Titan A.E..

=== 1999–2006: The Daily Show with Jon Stewart and The Colbert Report ===
In 1999, he caught the attention of Jon Stewart, who was about to become host of The Daily Show, and was offered the role of the show's head writer. In 2002 he was promoted to co-executive producer, and became executive producer in 2003 following the departure of Madeleine Smithberg. A year later Karlin, Stewart, and at the time Daily Show head writer, David Javerbaum, co-wrote and edited America (The Book), a parody of a United States high school civics textbook. In 2005, Stewart's Busboy Productions reached an agreement with Comedy Central to finance the production company. Karlin joined in the re-launch, co-producing and co-creating alongside Stewart and former Daily Show correspondent Stephen Colbert, its first television show, The Colbert Report. To make sure there was no overlap in subject matter between the two shows, Karlin made trips between the studios during the Report early days to supervise scripts. In 2006, Karlin helped Stewart write and prepare the script for the 78th Academy Awards, which Stewart hosted. In December of that year Karlin announced he was leaving both The Daily Show and The Colbert Report.

== 2007–present: Post Comedy Central ==
In August 2007, Karlin signed a deal with HBO to produce series, specials, and telepics under the banner of Picturehouse and Karlin's own company, Superego Industries. In December 2008 it was revealed that SuperEgo Industries was the company behind WonderGlen, a comedy website purporting to be the company intranet for an eccentric group of Los Angeles TV and film producers. In 2008, Karlin released the book Things I've Learned From Women Who've Dumped Me, which features a collection of essays on rejection from different comedians and Karlin himself. The book introduction was written by Karlin's mother Barbara.

In 2025 Karlin co-wrote and executive produced the TV series Bait (TV series) created by and starring british musician and comedian Riz Ahmed for Amazon Prime, released on March 25th 2026 to universally positive reviews.

== Personal life ==
Karlin married Paola Guastini in May 2006. Their son Theo was born in 2007. Karlin filed for divorce from Guastini in 2012.
