= Chris Regan =

American comedy writer

Chris Regan is an American comedy writer and filmmaker. He has been a writer for Family Guy since 2013, where he currently serves as a Co-Executive Producer. From 1999 to 2006, Regan was a writer on The Daily Show with Jon Stewart, where he won five Emmy awards, two Peabody Awards, and was nominated for a Writers Guild of America award.

== Early childhood and education ==
Regan was born in the Bronx, raised in Ulster County and graduated from New Paltz High School. He has a degree from Ithaca College.

== Career ==
Regan is an Emmy-award winning writer. In addition to being a writer on Family Guy and The Daily Show, Regan has written for Talkshow with Spike Feresten, The Burn with Jeff Ross, Lopez Tonight, and The Jeselnik Offensive. He has written comedy pilots for 20th Century Fox, Comedy Central and in 2011, developed a pilot with The Jim Henson Company and Bunim/Murray Productions.

Regan has written several books. Regan was a co-author of the best-selling America (The Book). His book, Mass Historia: 365 Days of Historical Facts and (Mostly) Fictions, was published by Andrews McMeel in Fall 2008, and he was the co-author of the humor book/memoir Shatner Rules with William Shatner. His essays have appeared in New York magazine. The Daily Beast, and USA Today.

In 2017, Regan portrayed game show host Monty Hall in the Showtime comedy/drama series I'm Dying Up Here.

== Personal ==
Regan resides in Los Angeles.
