= Kevin Bleyer =

American television writer and producer (1971–2026)

- Born: November 18, 1971; Bethesda, Maryland, U.S.
- Died: October 25, 2026 (aged 54); Millrift, Pennsylvania, U.S.
- Education: Stanford University
- Occupations: Television writer and producer
- Notable work: The Daily Show with Jon Stewart
- Spouse: Nella Vera (m. 2025)

Kevin Joseph Bleyer (November 18, 1971 – October 25, 2026) was an American television writer and producer. He won multiple Emmy, Peabody, and Writers Guild Awards. Bleyer was a writer for The Daily Show with Jon Stewart, a contributor to President Barack Obama's speeches, the author of the best-selling Me the People: One Man's Selfless Quest to Rewrite the Constitution, a co-author of the #1 NY Times Bestseller Earth: The Book, and the co-author, with Governor Bill Richardson, of How to Sweet-Talk a Shark. In 2008, he became a member of the Council on Foreign Relations. In 2014, he served as a Fellow at the University of Chicago Institute of Politics.

== Early life ==
Bleyer was born in Bethesda, Maryland, on November 18, 1971. He was the younger brother of sports anchor Keith Bleyer.

He was raised in Seattle, Washington, and had a role in the film Twice in a Lifetime as a teenager. He went on to attend Stanford University, where he sang with the Stanford Fleet Street Singers and studied both communications and computer engineering, earning a degree in the former in 1994. He also had an internship at New York's Public Theater, where he assisted playwright Anna Deavere Smith and performed dramaturgical duties with playwright Tony Kushner.

== Television writing ==
After doing commentaries and freelance reporting for NPR's All Things Considered and American Public Media's Marketplace, Bleyer began his television writing career as a writer and producer for Politically Incorrect with Bill Maher from 1996 to 2002. He then wrote for the critically acclaimed Bravo series Significant Others and created and executive produced the Showtime pilot Nightly, in which he was also featured as an on-air correspondent. In 2003, Bleyer became a writer and producer on Dennis Miller, a position he held until the show's cancellation in 2005.

From 2005 to 2013, Bleyer was a member of the writing staff of The Daily Show, where he worked on over 1000 episodes and several specials, for which the show won four Emmys for outstanding writing. He and the show's other writers also won a WGA Award in 2010. Bleyer was also one of several Daily Show writers to write for the 80th Annual Academy Awards in 2008, when Jon Stewart served as host.

After his tenure at The Daily Show, he was a writer for the first two seasons of the Fox supernatural dramedy Sleepy Hollow.

In 2013, as a USAID consultant, Bleyer produced "Studio 7" in Bishkek, Kyrgyzstan, the first topical news political satire program in Central Asia.

== Political writing and activities ==
Bleyer contributed to many of President Barack Obama's addresses, including his comedic speeches at the annual White House Correspondents Dinner, from the President's inauguration in 2009 to at least 2013. After the speech in 2010, reporters from several outlets reported erroneously that The Daily Show staff worked on the President's remarks. The White House and Comedy Central clarified that Bleyer worked independently on the speech, in light of accusations of the show being too close to Obama.

Among the first contributors chosen to launch The Huffington Post, Bleyer was a frequent commentator for National Public Radio. He also reported from Iraq as part of The Daily Show's "Operation: Silent Thunder", featuring correspondent Rob Riggle, in 2007. That same year, he was profiled by Charlie Rose.

In 2008, Bleyer participated in a mock debate before the United States Congress based on the 2007–2008 Writers Guild of America strike, which involved multiple sitting Congresspeople. He also spoke to NPR about his involvement in the strike.

Bleyer was the author of the book Me The People: One Man's Selfless Quest to Rewrite the Constitution of the United States of America, published by Random House in June 2012. He was also the co-author, with former US Ambassador to the United Nations Bill Richardson, of "How to Sweet-Talk a Shark", detailing their humanitarian trip to North Korea in 2013 and their attempts to negotiate the release of Korean-American detainee Kenneth Bae.

== Personal life and death ==
Bleyer lived in New York for the last 20 years of his life. He married Nella Vera in 2025, after they had been a couple since 2015. He died in a single-vehicle traffic collision in Millrift, Pennsylvania, on October 25, 2026, at the age of 54.
