= Rachel Axler =

American screenwriter and playwright (born 20th century)

- Born: 20th century Queens, New York City, New York, U.S.
- Education: Williams College (BA); University of California, San Diego (MFA)
- Occupations: Television writer, playwright
- Years active: 2005 – present

Rachel Axler (born 20th century) is an American screenwriter and playwright. In television, her credits include Childrens Hospital, How I Met Your Mother, The Goodwin Games, New Girl, Bored to Death, Parks and Recreation, Veep, and The Daily Show.

== Early life and education ==
Axler was born in Queens, New York. She graduated from Hunter College High School in 1995 and Williams College in 1999. She received a Master of Fine Arts degree from the University of California, San Diego.

== Career ==
As a playwright, her works include the plays Smudge and Archaeology.

Axler has won four Primetime Emmy Awards. In 2006 and 2009, Axler won two Emmy Awards for her work on The Daily Show as a part of the writing team. In 2016 and 2017, she won two Primetime Emmy Awards for Outstanding Comedy Series for her work as supervising producer on Veep. She was also nominated for, but did not win, an Emmy Award in 2007 for The Daily Show.
