= Joe Opio =

Ugandan comedian

- Born: Kampala, Uganda
- Occupations: Television writer, comedian
- Years active: 2012–present

Joe Opio is a Ugandan comedian and television writer. He formerly hosted LOLUganda, a satirical Ugandan news program. He is a writer for The Daily Show.

== Early life and career ==
Opio was born in Kampala, Uganda. He earned a law degree and worked as an accountant for Deloitte for many years, later transitioning into comedy. In 2012, he began hosting the satirical news program LOLUganda. After two seasons, Opio decided to move to New York City to pursue a career in comedy. While performing at the Comedy Cellar, he met Trevor Noah, who hired him as a writer for his first season of The Daily Show. Opio has been nominated for two Writers Guild of America Awards for his writing on The Daily Show.

== See also ==
- Ugandan Americans
