= Kat Radley =

American screenwriter

- Born: 1985 (age 40–41)
- Education: University of Virginia
- Occupations: Comedian, writer
- Known for: The Daily Show

Kat Radley is an American comedian, actress and television writer. She is a writer for The Daily Show.

== Early life ==
Radley was born and raised in Montclair, Virginia and attended Bishop Ireton High School. She received her secondary education at the University of Virginia, where she earned a masters degree in English education. After graduating in 2008, she worked as a high school English teacher for several years.

== Career ==
Radley began her standup career in 2008 when she entered Rooftop Comedy’s National College Comedy Competition. After placing in the top four, she went on to the 2008 Aspen RooftopComedy Festival. She studied improv at the Upright Citizens Brigade in Los Angeles and performed at M.I.'s Westside Comedy Theater. In 2011, she won the Friars Club Audience Award at Boston's Third Annual Women in Comedy Festival. Radley has been regularly featured on Fox's Laughs stand-up comedy series. In 2015, Radley released her first stand-up album, The Important Thing Is That I’m Pretty.

In August 2017, Radley began working as a writer for The Daily Show. In 2018, she performed with the show's writing staff on the Daily Show Writers Stand-Up Tour. She has been a guest on several comedy podcasts, including HeadGum's Good One.

As an actress, she has appeared in several comedy short films and played the character of Porn Girl on The Daily Show.

== Awards and honors ==
- 2011 Friars Club Audience Award at the Women in Comedy Festival

== Discography ==
- 2015 The Important Thing Is That I’m Pretty (Uproar Records)
