= Zhubin Parang =

American actor, comedian, producer, and writer (born 1981)

- Born: June 4, 1981 (age 45); Knoxville, Tennessee, U.S.
- Occupations: Actor, comedian, comedy writer, television producer
- Years active: 2005–present
- Known for: The Daily Show

Zhubin Parang (born June 4, 1981) is an American comedian and television writer. He is a producer and writer on the political-satire series The Daily Show.

== Early life and education ==
Parang was born in Knoxville, Tennessee, on June 4, 1981, to Iranian parents. His father, Masood, is a professor and the associate dean of academic and student affairs at the University of Tennessee's Tickle College of Engineering.

Parang attended Vanderbilt University, where he was a member of the Tongue 'N' Cheek improvisation group and Lambda Chi Alpha fraternity. After graduating in 2003 with a degree in political science and sociology, Parang earned his Juris Doctor degree from the Georgetown University Law Center.

== Career ==
While working as a lawyer, he continued doing improv at the Upright Citizens Brigade New York City. After practicing corporate law for four years, Parang decided to quit and focus on a career in comedy.

His first writing job was for Jake Sasseville's Late Night Republic.

In 2011, Parang received an e-mail from The Daily Show asking him to submit, which he did at the advice of Hallie Haglund. They then hired him as a staff writer under Jon Stewart. In 2015, after four years at The Daily Show, he was promoted to head writer when Trevor Noah became host. In 2018, he was promoted to producer.

== Awards and honors ==
- 2012 - Primetime Emmy Award for Outstanding Writing for a Variety Series for The Daily Show
- 2015 - Primetime Emmy Award for Outstanding Writing for a Variety Series for The Daily Show
- 2017 - inducted into the Student Media Hall of Fame at Vanderbilt University

== See also ==
- List of American writers
- List of people from Knoxville, Tennessee
