= Matt Koff =

American comedian

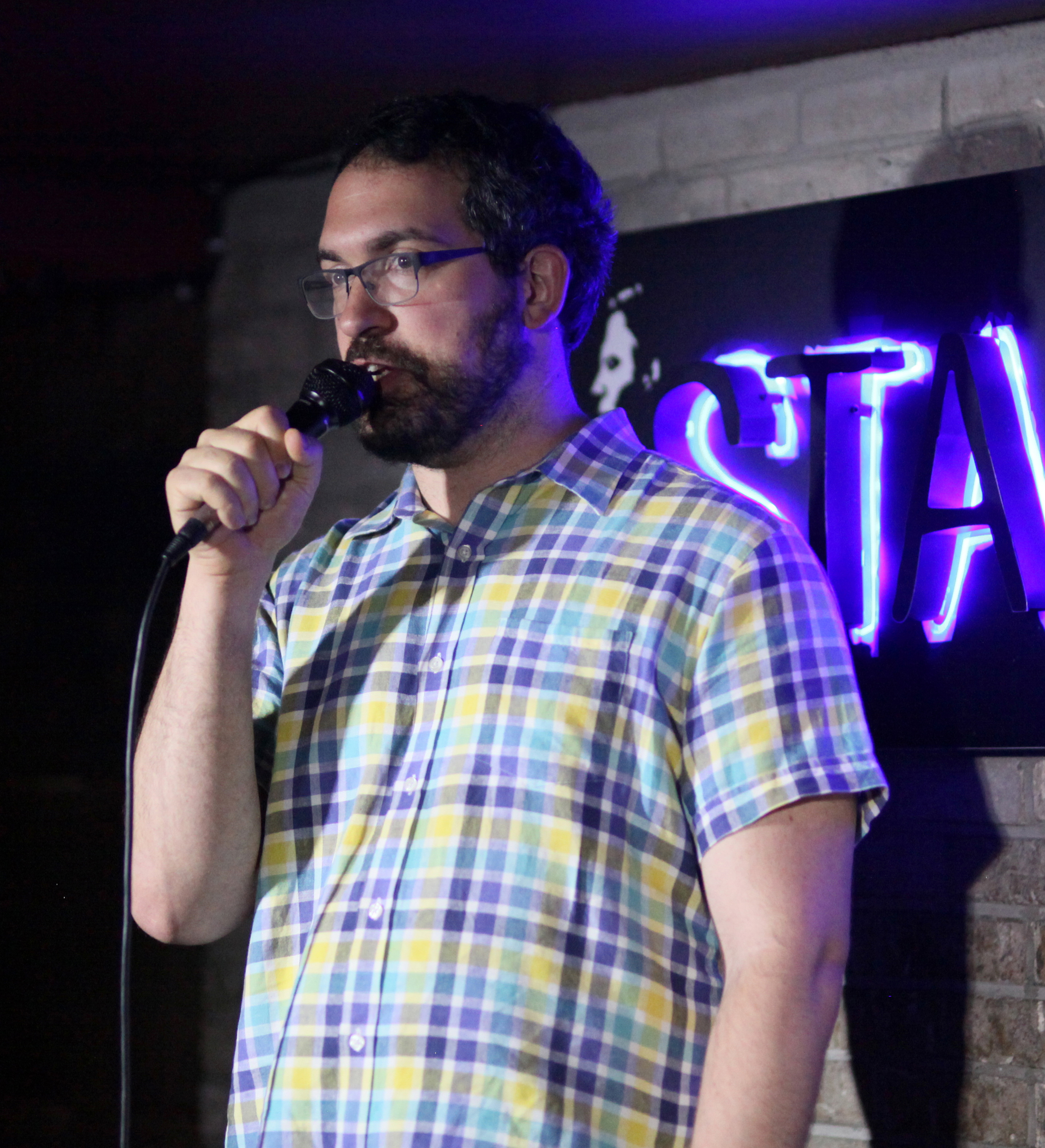
- Koff performing in New York City, July 2016.
- Website: www.mattkoff.net

Matt Koff is an American comedian and an Emmy-winning writer for the news satire program The Daily Show. He was previously a contributing writer for The Onion News Network and appeared onscreen in the History channel series I Love the 1880s. He has appeared as a guest on podcasts including The Flop House and Baby Geniuses.

Koff was a co-writer and co-star (along with Daily Show writer Dan McCoy) of the animated webseries 9 AM Meeting, which won an MTV development deal at the 2010 New York Television Festival. In 2011, Koff was given the "Joke of the Year" award by Time Out New York based on a reader poll.

In November 2019, Koff released his debut comedy album, Who's My Little Guy?
