= Adam Lowitt =

American comedian and TV producer

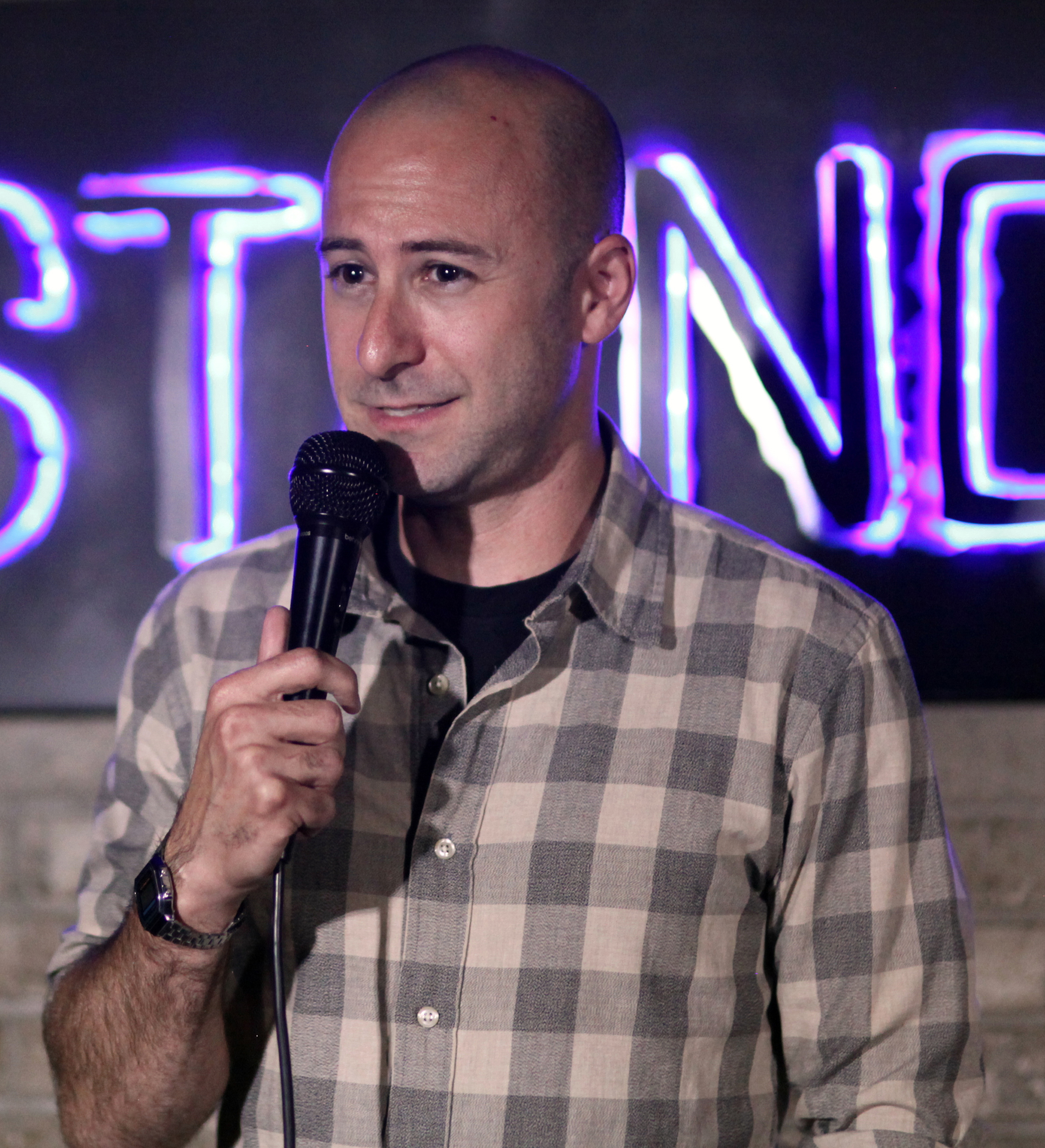
- Lowitt performing in July 2016

Comedy career
- Medium: Stand-up comedy, television
- Website: adamlowitt.com//

Adam Lowitt is an American standup comedian, a four-time Emmy-winning, six-time nominated co-executive producer and supervising producer for the news satire program The Daily Show. He performs regularly in New York and performed on Comedy Central as part of John Oliver's New York Stand-Up Show. In 2012, Adam was selected to perform at the Just for Laughs Festival in Montreal as part of their New Faces Showcase. Adam often performs locally and has opened for other comedians he worked with at The Daily Show. From December 2015 until March 2017, he was an on-air contributor on The Daily Show. He was an executive producer on Sacha Baron Cohen's 2018 comedy series Who Is America?.

== Awards ==
Year	Outcome	Primetime Emmy Category
2009	Won	Outstanding Variety, Music, or Comedy Series
2010	Won	Outstanding Variety, Music, or Comedy Series
2011	Won	Outstanding Variety, Music, or Comedy Series
2012	Won	Outstanding Variety Series
2013	Nominated	Outstanding Variety Series
2014	Nominated	Outstanding Variety Series

== Personal life ==
Adam Lowitt went to Countryside High School in Clearwater, Florida and studied at the University of Florida. On September 13, 2014, Adam Lowitt married Becky Friedman. Becky is the head writer of Daniel Tiger's Neighborhood on PBS as well as a writer and editor for Out of the Blue Enterprises. Adam Lowitt lives in New York, New York with his wife.
