= Jo Miller =

American television writer

- Citizenship: United States
- Occupations: Writer; producer
- Years active: 2007–present

Jo Miller is an American television writer and satirist. Formerly a writer on The Daily Show with Jon Stewart, she was the showrunner, executive producer and head writer of Full Frontal with Samantha Bee, a satirical half-hour weekly show on the cable network TBS, until October 2017.

== Career ==
After co-founding the improvisational comedy troupe Just Add Water at Yale University (and graduating with high honors with a B.A. in Medieval History), Miller received a Fulbright Scholarship to attend Queens' College at the University of Cambridge in England, where she received an M.A. She subsequently attended Cornell University, where she left before she got her Ph.D. in Medieval Jewish History. She eventually left academia and in 2007, joined comedian Lizz Winstead's satirical live show Wake Up World, working as a writer and cast member. In 2009, Miller joined The Daily Show with Jon Stewart as a writer, in a reunion with her former Just Add Water colleague, Steve Bodow. The show's writers were nominated for six primetime Emmy Awards during her tenure, and won three. (They were also nominated for a daytime Emmy for their work on the aired presentation of Rally to Restore Sanity and/or Fear).

In Spring 2015, as Jon Stewart was preparing to leave the show, departing cast member Samantha Bee asked Miller to become the head writer on her new half-hour weekly show for TBS. Full Frontal with Samantha Bee began airing on February 8, 2016 to critical and audience acclaim. On July 14, 2016, the show received an Emmy nomination for outstanding writing for a variety series. The following year, the show was nominated for the same award plus three others: outstanding writing for a variety special, outstanding variety talk series, and outstanding variety talk special, winning for outstanding writing for a variety special. Miller served as head writer, showrunner and executive producer until October 2017.
