= Rich Blomquist =

American television writer

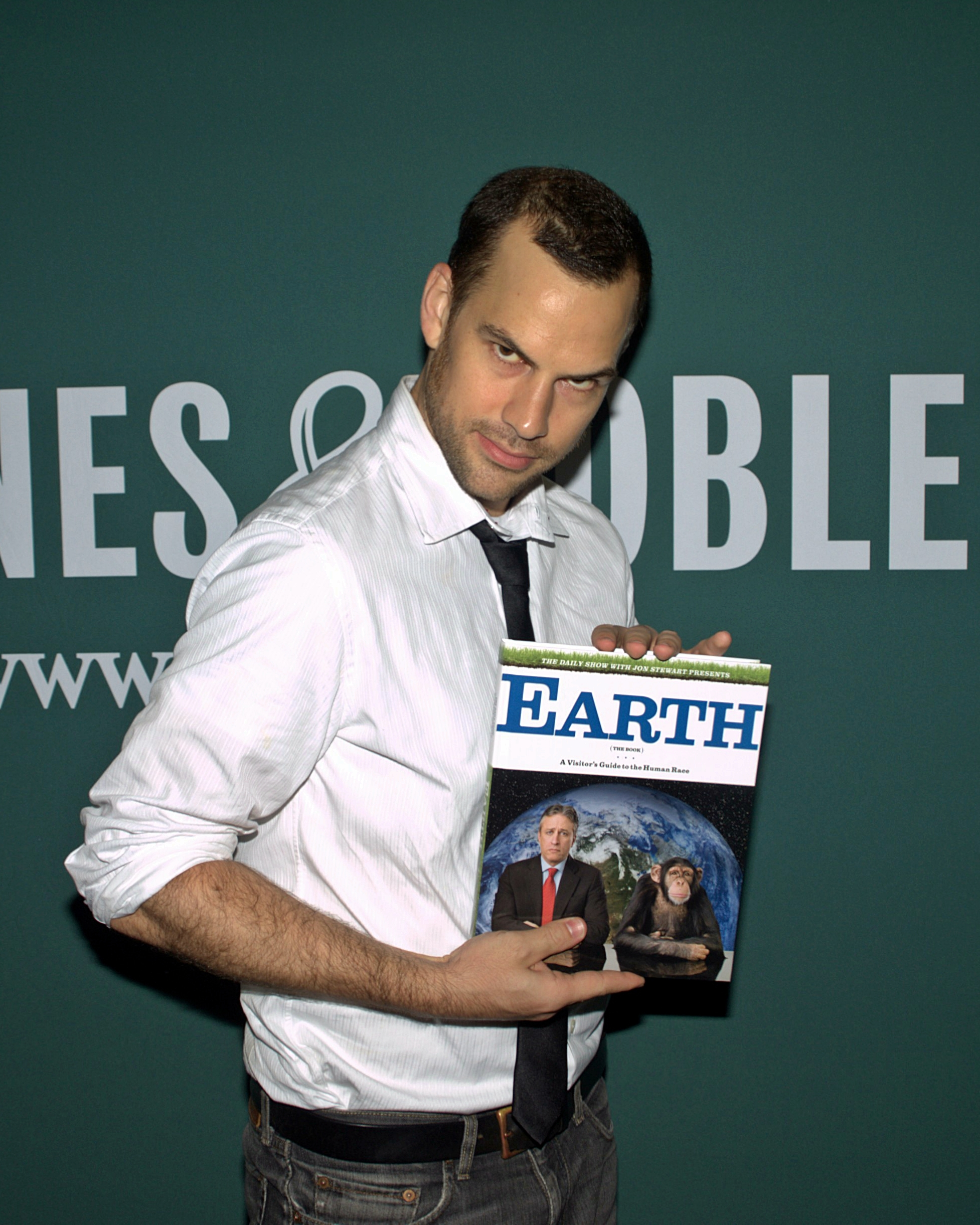
- Blomquist at the 2010 launch of Earth, which he helped write.
- Born: July 27, 1977 (age 49)
- Education: Elon University
- Occupations: Television writer; producer; actor
- Spouse: Kristen Schaal (m. 2012)
- Children: 1
- Writing career
- Years active: 2003–present

Rich Blomquist (born July 27, 1977) is an American writer, producer and occasional actor. He was a staff writer for The Daily Show in 2003–2006, 2009 and 2011.

== Career ==
He has also contributed material to Saturday Night Live, specifically for Robert Smigel's TV Funhouse. Blomquist is originally from Westbrook, Connecticut. He graduated in 2000 from the School of Communications at Elon University in North Carolina.

Blomquist and his wife Kristen Schaal wrote a book together called The Sexy Book of Sexy Sex. It was published in July 2010 by Chronicle Books.

Blomquist wrote for The Last Man on Earth until it got cancelled and then wrote for the animated sitcom Bless the Harts, both for Fox Broadcasting Company and 20th Century Fox Television.

Blomquist also voices Daniel, Louise's (Jenny's boss) husband in Bless the Harts.

== Personal life ==
Blomquist is married to stand up comic, actress, and voice actress Kristen Schaal. They have a daughter, Ruby, born February 11, 2018. He is of Swedish descent.

== Books ==
- 2010 – Earth (The Book)
- 2010 – The Sexy Book of Sexy Sex – co-written with wife Kristen Schaal
