= Hallie Haglund =

American comedian and writer

- Born: September 5, 1982 (age 44); Denver, Colorado, U.S.
- Education: Yale University

Comedy career
- Medium: Television, stand-up, books
- Genres: Political/news satire, improvisational comedy
- Subjects: American culture, American politics, pop culture, current events

Hallie Haglund (born September 5, 1982) is an American comedian, Emmy-winning writer, and producer. She is currently head writer and executive producer on Wyatt Cenac's Problem Areas.

== Career ==
Haglund worked as an NBC Studios page in Los Angeles while studying improv comedy at the Upright Citizens Brigade's L.A. theater.

She joined The Daily Show as a writers' assistant in 2006, and served as a staff writer from 2010 to 2017, making her the longest-serving female writer on the show. During her time writing for The Daily Show, Haglund won three Primetime Emmy awards. She is a contributor to the 2010 humor book Earth (The Book), written by Jon Stewart and other writers of The Daily Show.

Haglund has appeared several times as a guest on movie podcast The Flop House, which has led to her inclusion in the "Quotes of the Week" section of The A.V. Club column Podmass.
