= David Javerbaum =

American screenwriter

- Born: 1971 (age 54–55)
- Education: Harvard University (BA); New York University (MFA)
- Occupations: Writer, lyricist
- Spouse: Debra Bard (m. 2002)

David Adam Javerbaum /ˈdʒævərˌbɔːm/ (born 1971) is an American comedy writer and lyricist. Javerbaum has won 13 Emmy Awards in his career, 11 of them for his work on The Daily Show with Jon Stewart. He runs the popular Twitter account @TheTweetOfGod, which at its peak had 6.2 million followers. The account was the basis for his play An Act of God, which opened on Broadway in the spring of 2015 starring Jim Parsons, and again in the spring of 2016 starring Sean Hayes. The play has gone on to receive over 100 productions in 20 countries and 11 languages.

== Work ==
Javerbaum was hired as a staff writer with The Daily Show with Jon Stewart in 1999. He was promoted to head writer in 2002 and became an executive producer at the end of 2006. His work for the program won 11 Emmy Awards, a Grammy Award, three Peabody Awards and Television Critics Association Awards for both Best Comedy and Best News Show. He was also one of the three principal authors of the show's textbook parody America (The Book): A Citizen's Guide to Democracy Inaction, which sold 2.6 million copies and won the 2005 Thurber Prize for American Humor. He became a consulting producer at the start of 2009 and spearheaded the writing of the book's 2010 sequel, Earth (The Book): A Visitor's Guide to the Human Race; his co-production of the audiobook earned the 2011 Grammy Award for Best Spoken-Word Album. He left the show in 2010. In 2013 he was hired by Fusion to create and executive-produce two news-parody shows, No, You Shut Up! and Good Morning Today, in conjunction with The Henson Company. In 2015 he worked as a producer for The Late Late Show with James Corden on CBS. In 2016 Javerbaum co-created the Netflix sitcom Disjointed with Chuck Lorre. He was also a consulting producer and one of three writers on Lorre's 2018 Netflix show The Kominsky Method. As of 2020 he is co-Executive Producer of the revival of Beavis and Butt-Head for Comedy Central.

Javerbaum's other work includes serving as head writer and supervising producer for both Comedy Central's first-ever Comedy Awards and The Secret Policeman's Ball 2012, writing and producing the original musical-comedy pilot Browsers for Amazon in 2013, and writing three episodes for the 2011 relaunch of Beavis and Butt-Head. He wrote for the Late Show with David Letterman from 1998 to 1999.

== Books ==
In addition to co-writing the two Daily Show books he is the sole author of three: the 2009 pregnancy satire What to Expect When You're Expected: A Fetus's Guide to the First Three Trimesters; 2011's The Last Testament: A Memoir by God, in conjunction with which he created @TheTweetOfGod; and, also as "God", The Book of Pslams: 97 Divine Diatribes on Humanity's Total Failure, which was published in April 2022 by Simon & Schuster. He also co-authored Neil Patrick Harris's 2014 memoir, The Choose Your Own Autobiography of Neil Patrick Harris.

Javerbaum graduated from Harvard University. While there, he wrote for the humor magazine The Harvard Lampoon and served as lyricist and co-bookwriter for two productions of the Hasty Pudding Theatricals. Later he spent three years contributing headlines to The Onion, and is credited as one of the writers for its first book, 1998's Our Dumb Century.

"A Quantum Theory of Mitt Romney," his humorous essay written for The New York Times, appeared in April 2012.

== Awards ==
Javerbaum's score for the 2008 Broadway musical Cry-Baby, which he co-wrote with Adam Schlesinger, was nominated for a Tony Award for Best Original Score. Along with composer/co-librettist Robert S. Cohen, he wrote Suburb, which was nominated for Outer Critics' Circle and Drama League awards for Best Off-Broadway Musical in 2001.

== Personal life ==
Javerbaum is the son of Tema and Kenneth S. Javerbaum of Watchung, New Jersey. His mother is a former deputy New Jersey attorney general. His father is a founding partner in Javerbaum Wurgaft Hicks Kahn Wikstrom & Sinins P.C., a law firm in Springfield, New Jersey. Javerbaum grew up in a Jewish household, attending Congregation Beth El in South Orange, New Jersey. He married Debra Bard in 2002. Javerbaum grew up in Maplewood, New Jersey, where he attended Columbia High School, graduating in 1989.

He was a finalist on the 1988 Jeopardy! Teen Tournament and its 1998 Teen Reunion Tournament. Jon Stewart also called him as his phone-a-friend when Jon was on Celebrity Millionaire.

Preceded by Mitch Epner	Jeopardy! Teen Tournament first runner-up 1988	Succeeded by Stanley Wu
