= Daniel Radosh =

American journalist and blogger

- Born: March 23, 1969 (age 57)
- Education: Oberlin College
- Occupations: Journalist, television writer
- Years active: 1985–present

Daniel Radosh (born 23 March 1969) is an American journalist and blogger. Radosh is a senior writer for The Daily Show with Trevor Noah. Previously, he was a staff writer for The Daily Show with Jon Stewart and a contributing editor at The Week. He writes occasionally for The New Yorker. His writing has also appeared in Entertainment Weekly, Esquire, GQ, Mademoiselle, McSweeney's Quarterly Concern, Might, New York Magazine, The New York Times, Playboy, Radar, Salon, Slate, and other publications. From 2000 to 2001, he was a senior editor for Modern Humorist. In the 1990s he was a writer and editor at Spy. Radosh began his writing career at Youth Communication in 1985, where as a high school student he published more than a dozen stories in New Youth Connections (now YCteen), a magazine by and for New York City teenagers.

His blog, Radosh.net, was named one of the "top 25 blogs" by Time.com in 2008. As a blogger, he is probably best known for his public dispute with journalist Peter Landesman, who wrote an article about sexual slavery in the January 25, 2004, issue of The New York Times Magazine titled "The Girls Next Door". When Radosh challenged the facts of the article, Landesman threatened legal action against Radosh. A series of articles about the dispute by Jack Shafer in Slate turned the issue of the article's accuracy — and of the legal rights and responsibilities of blogs — into one of the most controversial topics in journalism during the first half of 2004.

Much of Radosh's journalism is on lighter topics, however: the description for his blog is "Pop. Politics. Sex. So On." In pop-culture circles, Radosh is known for his obsession with tracing Huckapoo's attempts to infiltrate popular consciousness. He also runs on his blog the New Yorker Cartoon Anti-Caption Contest, a spoof of The New Yorker's weekly cartoon caption contest.

His first book, Rapture Ready!: Adventures in the Parallel Universe of Christian Pop Culture, was published by Scribner in 2008.

== Personal life ==
Radosh is the son of historian Ronald Radosh. He graduated from Stuyvesant High School in 1987 and from Oberlin College in 1991, and currently resides in Brooklyn, New York. He has three children. Radosh identifies as a Humanistic Jew.
