= Steve Bodow =

American television writer and producer

Steve Bodow is an American television writer and producer. Most recently, he was an Executive producer and showrunner of Netflix's Patriot Act with Hasan Minhaj. From 2015 to early 2019, he was an Executive producer/co-showrunner of The Daily Show with Trevor Noah, following his 13 years at The Daily Show with Jon Stewart as an Executive producer, head writer and staff writer. In his time at TDS, Bodow won 14 Emmys and two Peabody Awards.

Bodow also co-edited and co-wrote the Daily Show's three best-selling books, America: The Book; Earth: The Book (2010); and The Donald J. Trump Presidential Twitter Library. The Trump Twitter Library also became a live installation event, touring the US and winning a Cannes Lions Grand Prix. He was additionally Consulting Producer for The Opposition with Jordan Klepper, after serving as EP on the hour-long Jordan Klepper Solves Guns special.

In 2021, Bodow created and coordinated "Climate Night," a one-night event where seven major American late-night shows devoted their airtime to climate issues, reaching a total audience of more than 20 million viewers.

Bodow is a founding member and a past artistic director of New York theater group Elevator Repair Service, best known for Gatz, its full-text adaptation of The Great Gatsby. The NYTimes called Gatz “the most remarkable achievement in theater not only of this year but also of this decade.” Gatz played sold-out runs at New York's Public Theater, London's Old Vic, and in more than 25 other cities globally.

Before joining The Daily Show in 2002, Bodow was a journalist for Wired, New York Magazine, Salon and the New York Times Magazine. He grew up in Rye, NY, graduating Rye High School, Yale University, and NYU's Interactive Telecommunications Program. While at Yale, Bodow co-founded the improv group Just Add Water.

In 2023, he found out that he'd won a Grammy in 2011.
