= Writers Guild of America Award for Television: Comedy-Variety Talk Series =

Annual television award

Writers Guild of America Award for Television: Comedy/Variety Talk Series
- Awarded for: Outstanding Writing in a Comedy/Variety Talk Series
- Country: United States
- Presented by: Writers Guild of America
- First award: 1997
- Currently held by: Last Week Tonight with John Oliver (2025)
- Website: www.wga.org

The Writers Guild of America Award for Television: Comedy/Variety Talk Series is an award presented by the Writers Guild of America to the best writing in a comedy or variety talk program. With the exception of 1998 in which no award was given, it has been presented annually since the 49th Writers Guild of America Awards in 1997 where Late Night with Conan O'Brien won the first award. From the award's creation, the category was dominated by Late Night with Conan O'Brien, winning six of the first nine awards. Recently, Last Week Tonight with John Oliver has won the award the last four years in a row, and five times in the last six years.

== Winners and nominees ==
=== Notes ===
- The years denote when that particular season first aired; the awards are presented the following year. Though, due to the eligibility period, some nominees could have aired in a different year. Until 2001, the eligibility period adhered to a calendar schedule (January 1 to December 31). In 2001, the guild shifted to an earlier window (September 1, 2001 to November 30, 2002) to allow programs that premiered in the fall. From 2003 to 2018, the eligibility period was December 1 to November 30. Starting in 2018, the eligibility period shifted back to its original policy, corresponding with the calendar year (January 1 to December 31). The winners are highlighted in gold.

=== 1990s ===
Year	Program	Writer(s)	Network	Ref.
1996 (49th)	Late Night with Conan O'Brien	Jonathan Groff, Brian Kiley, Janine Ditullio, Tom Agna, Chris Albers, Tommy Blacha, Brian McCann, Michael Gordon, Mike Sweeney, Greg Cohen, Andy Richter, Conan O'Brien, Ned Goldreyer, and Dino Stamatopoulos	NBC	
1996 (49th)	Dennis Miller Live	Eddie Feldmann, Dennis Miller, David Feldman, Tom Hertz, Mike Gandolfi, Leah Krinsky, and Rick Overton	HBO	
1996 (49th)	Tracey Takes On...	(Episodes: "Charity," "Nostalgia," "Family," "Royalty," and "Health") Jerry Belson, Dick Clement, Kim Fuller, Jenji Kohan, Ian La Frenais, Molly Newman, Gail Parent, Tony Sheehan, Tracey Ullman, and Allen J. Zipper	HBO	
1997 (50th)	No award given			
1998 (51st)	Dennis Miller Live	Eddie Feldmann, David Feldman, Jose Arroyo, Leah Krinsky Atkins, Dennis Miller, Jim Hanna, and David Weiss	HBO	
1998 (51st)	Late Night with Conan O'Brien	Jonathan Groff, Brian Kiley, Janine Ditullio, Ellie Barancik, Chris Albers, Tommy Blacha, Brian McCann, Brian Reich, Michael Gordon, Mike Sweeney, Greg Cohen, Andy Richter, Conan O'Brien, Robert Smigel, Brian Stack, and Jon Glaser	NBC	
1999 (52nd)	Late Night with Conan O'Brien	Jonathan Groff, Jon Glaser, Conan O'Brien, Andy Richter, Mike Sweeney, Michael Gordon, Brian Kiley, Brian Stack, Chris Albers, Brian McCann, Ellie Barancik, Janine Ditullio, Andy Blitz, Tommy Blacha, Brian Reich, Vernon Chatman, and Roy Jenkins	NBC	
1999 (52nd)	Dennis Miller Live	Eddie Feldmann, Jose Arroyo, David Feldman, Jim Hanna, Leah Krinsky, Dennis Miller, and David Weiss	HBO	
1999 (52nd)	Late Show with David Letterman	Rodney Rothman, Gerard Mulligan, Bill Scheft, Michael Barrie, Jim Mulholland, Joe Toplyn, Eric Stangel, Justin Stangel, Steve Young, Gabe Abelson, Carter Bays, Craig Thomas, Jon Beckerman, Chris Harris, Tom Ruprecht, Beth Sherman, Jeff Boggs, David Javerbaum, Rob Burnett, and David Letterman	CBS	

=== 2000s ===
Year	Program	Writer(s)	Network	Ref.
2000 (53rd)	Dennis Miller Live	Supervising Writer: Eddie Feldmann; Writers: Jose Arroyo, David Feldman, Jim Hanna, Leah Krinsky Atkins, Dennis Miller, Jacob Sager Weinstein, and David Weiss	HBO	
2000 (53rd)	Late Night with Conan O'Brien	Jonathan Groff, Mike Sweeney, Jon Glaser, Roy Jenkins, Michael Gordon, Brian Kiley, Brian Stack, Chris Albers, Brian McCann, Ellen Barancik, Janine Ditullio, Andy Blitz, Andy Richter, and Conan O'Brien	NBC	
2000 (53rd)	Late Show with David Letterman	Bill Scheft, Carter Bays, Chris Harris, David Letterman, Eric Stangel, Gabe Abelson, Gerry Mulligan, Jim Mulholland, Joe Toplyn, Justin Stangel, Lee H. Ellenberg, Michael Barrie, Rob Burnett, Rodney Rothman, Steve Young, Tom Ruprecht, and Craig Thomas	CBS	
2000 (53rd)	Politically Incorrect	Supervising Writers: Chris Kelly and Billy Martin; Writers: Kevin Bleyer, Brian Jacobsmeyer, Bill Kelley, Bill Maher, Jerry Nachman, Ned Rice, Danny Vermont, Douglas M. Wilson, and Scott Carter	ABC	
2000 (53rd)	Saturday Night Live	Supervising Writer: Tina Fey; Writers: Kevin Brennan, Cindy Caponera, Robert Carlock, Jerry Collins, Steven Cragg, Tony Daro, Ali Reza, Tina Fey, Hugh Fink, Richard Francese, Tim Herlihy, Steve Higgins, Adam McKay, Dennis McNicholas, Lorne Michaels, Paula Pell, J.J. Philbin, Matt Piedmont, Michael Schur, T. Sean Shannon, Andrew Steele, and Scott Wainio	NBC	
2001 (54th)	Late Night with Conan O'Brien	Mike Sweeney, Chris Albers, Ellie Barancik, Andy Blitz, Kevin Dorff, Jon Glaser, Michael Gordon, Brian Kiley, Michael Koman, Brian McCann, Guy Nicolucci, Conan O'Brien, Andrew Secunda, Robert Smigel, Brian Stack, and Andrew Weinberg	NBC	
2001 (54th)	Late Show with David Letterman	Eric Stangel, Justin Stangel, Gerard Mulligan, Joe Toplyn, Michael Barrie, Jim Mulholland, Steve Young, Gabe Abelson, Carter Bays, Craig Thomas, Chris Harris, Tom Ruprecht, Bill Scheft, Lee H. Ellenberg, and David Letterman	CBS	
2001 (54th)	Politically Incorrect	Supervising Writer: Billy Martin; Writers: Kevin Bleyer, Brian Jacobsmeyer, Bill Kelley, Bill Maher, Ned Rice, Kevin Rooney, Danny Vermont, and Eric Weinberg	ABC	
2001 (54th)	Saturday Night Live	Tina Fey, Dennis McNicholas, James Anderson, Robert Carlock, Tony Daro, James Downey, Hugh Fink, Melanie Graham, Steve Higgins, Erik Kenward, Adam McKay, Lorne Michaels, Jerry Minor, Matt Murray, Paula Pell, Matt Piedmont, Jon Rosenfeld, Frank Sebastiano, Michael Schur, T. Sean Shannon, Robert Smigel, Barry Sobel, Andrew Steele, and Scott Wainio	NBC	
2002 (55th)	Late Night with Conan O'Brien	Mike Sweeney, Chris Albers, Andy Blitz, Kevin Dorff, Jon Glaser, Michael Gordon, Brian Kiley, Michael Koman, Brian McCann, Guy Nicolucci, Conan O'Brien, Andrew Secunda, Allison Silverman, Robert Smigel, Brian Stack, and Andrew Weinberg	NBC	
2002 (55th)	Dennis Miller Live	Eddie Feldmann, Jose Arroyo, Rich Dahm, David Feldman, Jim Hanna, Rob Kutner, Dennis Miller, and Jacob Sager Weinstein	HBO	
2002 (55th)	MADtv	Supervising Writer: Scott King; Writers: Dick Blasucci, Garry Campbell, Lauren Dombrowski, Bryan Adams, Bruce McCoy, Michael Hitchcock, Steven Cragg, Chris Cluess, John Crane, Jennifer Joyce, Tami Sagher, Devon Shepard, Rich Talarico, Jim Wise, Kal Clarke, Sultan Pepper, Bill Kelley, Maiya Williams, and Dino Stamatopoulos	Fox	
2002 (55th)	Saturday Night Live	Tina Fey, Doug Abeles, Leo Allen, James Anderson, Max Brooks, James Downey, James Eagan, Hugh Fink, Charlie Grandy, Jack Handey, Steve Higgins, Erik Kenward, Dennis McNicholas, Lorne Michaels, Corwin Moore, Matt Murray, Paula Pell, Matt Piedmont, Ken Scarborough, Michael Schur, Frank Sebastiano, T. Sean Shannon, Eric Slovin, Robert Smigel, Emily Spivey, Andrew Steele, Scott Wainio, and Jerry Collins	NBC	
2003 (56th)	Penn & Teller: Bullshit!	Penn Jillette, Teller, David Wechter, and John McLaughlin	Showtime	
2003 (56th)	Late Night with Conan O'Brien	Mike Sweeney, Chris Albers, Jose Arroyo, Andy Blitz, Kevin Dorff, Jon Glaser, Michael Gordon, Brian Kiley, Michael Koman, Brian McCann, Guy Nicolucci, Conan O'Brien, Andrew Secunda, Allison Silverman, Robert Smigel, Brian Stack, and Andrew Weinberg	NBC	
2003 (56th)	MADtv	Supervising Writer: Scott King; Writers: Dick Blasucci, Lauren Dombrowski, Bryan Adams, Bruce McCoy, Michael Hitchcock, Steven Cragg, Chris Cluess, John Crane, Jennifer Joyce, Tami Sagher, David Salzman, Rich Talarico, Jim Wise, Kal Clarke, Sultan Pepper, Bill Kelley, Maiya Williams, Dino Stamatopoulos, Rick Najera, Brooks McBeth, Jason Kordelos, Michael McDonald, and Stephnie Weir	Fox	
2003 (56th)	Real Time with Bill Maher	Billy Martin, Scott Carter, David Feldman, Brian Jacobsmeyer, Jay Jaroch, Chris Kelly, Bill Maher, Ned Rice, and Paul F. Tompkins	HBO	
2004 (57th)	Late Night with Conan O'Brien	Mike Sweeney, Chris Albers, Jose Arroyo, Andy Blitz, Kevin Dorff, Daniel J. Goor, Michael Gordon, Brian Kiley, Michael Koman, Demetri Martin, Brian McCann, Guy Nicolucci, Conan O'Brien, Allison Silverman, Robert Smigel, Brian Stack, and Andrew Weinberg	NBC	
2004 (57th)	MADtv	Supervising Writer: Scott King; Writers: Dick Blasucci, Bryan Adams, Lauren Dombrowski, Steven Cragg, Chris Cluess, John Crane, Michael Hitchcock, Jennifer Joyce, Jason Kordelos, Brooks McBeth, Bruce McCoy, Michael McDonald, Rick Najera, Tami Sagher, David Salzman, Rich Talarico, Stephnie Weir, Maiya Williams, and Jim Wise	Fox	
2004 (57th)	Penn & Teller: Bullshit!	Penn Jillette, Teller, Star Price, John McLaughlin, Jon Hotchkiss, Emma Webster, David Wechter, and Jonathan B. Taylor; Special Material from Michael Goudeau	Showtime	
2004 (57th)	Real Time with Bill Maher	Scott Carter, Brian Jacobsmeyer, Jay Jaroch, Chris Kelly, Bill Maher, Billy Martin, Ned Rice, and David Feldman	HBO	
2005 (58th)	Late Night with Conan O'Brien	Mike Sweeney, Chris Albers, Jose Arroyo, Andy Blitz, Kevin Dorff, Dan Goor, Michael Gordon, Tim Harrod, Berkley Johnson, Brian Kiley, Michael Koman, Brian McCann, Guy Nicolucci, Conan O'Brien, Allison Silverman, Robert Smigel, Brian Stack, and Andrew Weinberg	NBC	
2005 (58th)	Penn & Teller: Bullshit!	Penn Jillette, Teller, Jon Hotchkiss, Michael Goudeau, Sheryl Zohn, and Steve Bortko	Showtime	
2005 (58th)	Real Time with Bill Maher	Head Writer: Billy Martin; Writers: Ross Abrash, Scott Carter, David Feldman, Brian Jacobsmeyer, Jay Jaroch, Chris Kelly, Bill Maher, and Danny Vermont	HBO	
2006 (59th)	Saturday Night Live	Head Writers: Tina Fey, Seth Meyers, and Andrew Steele; Writers: Doug Abeles, James Anderson, Alex Baze, Liz Cackowski, Charlie Grandy, Steve Higgins, Colin Jost, Erik Kenward, John Lutz, Lorne Michaels, Matt Murray, Paula Pell, Akiva Schaffer, Frank Sebastiano, T. Sean Shannon, Robert Smigel, J.B. Smoove, Emily Spivey, Jorma Taccone, and Bryan Tucker; Additional Sketches by Mike Schwartz and Kristin Gore	NBC	
2006 (59th)	The Daily Show with Jon Stewart	Head Writer: D.J. Javerbaum; Writers: Rachel Axler, Kevin Bleyer, Rich Blomquist, Steve Bodow, Tim Carvell, J.R. Havlan, Scott Jacobson, Ben Karlin, Rob Kutner, Sam Means, Chris Regan, Jason Reich, Jason Ross, and Jon Stewart	Comedy Central	
2006 (59th)	Late Night with Conan O'Brien	Mike Sweeney, Chris Albers, Jose Arroyo, Andy Blitz, Dan Cronin, Kevin Dorff, Jon Glaser, Daniel J. Goor, Michael Gordon, Tim Harrod, Berkley Johnson, Brian Kiley, Michael Koman, Brian McCann, Guy Nicolucci, Conan O'Brien, Brian Stack, and Andrew Weinberg	NBC	
2006 (59th)	Penn & Teller: Bullshit!	Penn Jillette, Teller, Jon Hotchkiss, Michael Goudeau, Star Price, Cliff Schoenberg, Sheryl Zohn, and Steve Melcher	Showtime	
2006 (59th)	Real Time with Bill Maher	Ross Abrash, Scott Carter, David Feldman, Matt Gunn, Brian Jacobsmeyer, Jay Jaroch, Chris Kelly, Bill Maher, Billy Martin, and Danny Vermont	HBO	
2007 (60th)	The Colbert Report	Bryan Adams, Michael Brumm, Stephen Colbert, Rich Dahm, Eric Drysdale, Rob Dubbin, Glenn Eichler, Peter Grosz, Peter Gwinn, Barry Julien, Jay Katsir, Laura Krafft, Frank Lesser, Tom Purcell, and Allison Silverman	Comedy Central	
2007 (60th)	The Daily Show with Jon Stewart	Head Writer: Steve Bodow; Writers: Rachel Axler, Kevin Bleyer, Rich Blomquist, Tim Carvell, J.R. Havlan, Scott Jacobson, D.J. Javerbaum, Rob Kutner, Josh Lieb, Sam Means, Jason Reich, Jason Ross, and Jon Stewart	Comedy Central	
2007 (60th)	Late Night with Conan O'Brien	Mike Sweeney, Chris Albers, Jose Arroyo, Dan Cronin, Kevin Dorff, Daniel J. Goor, Michael Gordon, Tim Harrod, Berkley Johnson, Brian Kiley, Michael Koman, Brian McCann, Guy Nicolucci, Conan O'Brien, Robert Smigel, Brian Stack, and Andrew Weinberg	NBC	
2007 (60th)	Penn & Teller: Bullshit!	Penn Jillette, Teller, David Weiss, Jon Hotchkiss, Michael Goudeau, Star Price, Sheryl Zohn, and Cliff Schoenberg	Showtime	
2007 (60th)	Real Time with Bill Maher	Scott Carter, David Feldman, Lance Crouther, Adam Felber, Matt Gunn, Brian Jacobsmeyer, Jay Jaroch, Chris Kelly, Bill Maher, Billy Martin, Jonathan Schmock, and Danny Vermont	HBO	
2007 (60th)	Saturday Night Live	Head Writers: Seth Meyers, Paula Pell, and Andrew Steele; Writers: Doug Abeles, James Anderson, Alex Baze, James Downey, Charlie Grandy, Steve Higgins, Colin Jost, Erik Kenward, John Lutz, Seth Meyers, Lorne Michaels, Matt Murray, Paula Pell, Marika Sawyer, Akiva Schaffer, Robert Smigel, John Solomon, Emily Spivey, Andrew Steele, Jorma Taccone, and Bryan Tucker; Additional Sketch by Jim Cashman	NBC	
2008 (61st)	Saturday Night Live	Head Writers: Seth Meyers, Andrew Steele, and Paula Pell; Writers: Doug Abeles, James Anderson, Alex Baze, Jessican Conrad, James Downey, Charlie Grandy, Steve Higgins, Colin Jost, Erik Kenward, Rob Klein, John Lutz, Lorne Michaels, John Mulaney, Paula Pell, Simon Rich, Marika Sawyer, Akiva Schaffer, Robert Smigel, John Solomon, Emily Spivey, Kent Sublette, Jorma Taccone, and Bryan Tucker; Additional Sketches by Robert Carlock	NBC	
2008 (61st)	The Colbert Report	Head Writers: Allison Silverman, Tom Purcell, and Rich Dahm; Writers: Bryan Adams, Michael Brumm, Stephen Colbert, Rob Dubbin, Glenn Eichler, Peter Grosz, Peter Gwinn, Barry Julien, Laura Krafft, Jay Katsir, Frank Lesser, and Meredith Scardino	Comedy Central	
2008 (61st)	The Daily Show with Jon Stewart	Head Writer: Steve Bodow; Writers: Rory Albanese, Rachel Axler, Kevin Bleyer, Rich Blomquist, Tim Carvell, Wyatt Cenac, J.R. Havlan, DJ Javerbaum, Rob Kutner, Josh Lieb, Sam Means, John Oliver, Jason Ross and Jon Stewart	Comedy Central	
2008 (61st)	Late Night with Conan O'Brien	Mike Sweeney, Chris Albers, Jose Arroyo, Dan Cronin, Kevin Dorff, Daniel J. Goor, Michael Gordon, Berkley Johnson, Brian Kiley, Michael Koman, Brian McCann, Guy Nicolucci, Conan O'Brien, Matt O'Brien, Robert Smigel, Brian Stack, and Andrew Weinberg	NBC	
2008 (61st)	Late Show with David Letterman	Head Writers: Eric Stangel and Justin Stangel; Writers: Michael Barrie, Jim Mulholland, Steve Young, Tom Ruprecht, Lee Ellenberg, Matt Roberts, Jeremy Weiner, Joe Grossman, Bill Scheft, Bob Borden, Frank Sebastiano, and David Letterman	CBS	
2008 (61st)	Real Time with Bill Maher	Bill Maher, Billy Martin, Scott Carter, Adam Felber, Matt Gunn, Brian Jacobsmeyer, Jay Jaroch, Chris Kelly, and Danny Vermont	HBO	
2009 (62nd)	The Daily Show with Jon Stewart	Head Writer: Steve Bodow; Writers: Rory Albanese, Kevin Bleyer, Rich Blomquist, Tim Carvell, Wyatt Cenac, Hallie Haglund, J. R. Havlan, David Javerbaum, Elliott Kalan, Josh Lieb, Sam Means, Jo Miller, John Oliver, Daniel Radosh, Jason Ross, and Jon Stewart	Comedy Central	
2009 (62nd)	Saturday Night Live	Head Writer: Seth Meyers; Writers: Doug Abeles, James Anderson, Alex Baze, Jessica Conrad, James Downey, Steve Higgins, Colin Jost, Erik Kenward, Rob Klein, John Lutz, Lorne Michaels, John Mulaney, Paula Pell, Simon Rich, Marika Sawyer, Akiva Schaffer, John Solomon, Emily Spivey, Kent Sublette, Jorma Taccone, and Bryan Tucker; Additional Sketch by Adam McKay and Andrew Steele	NBC	
2009 (62nd)	The Colbert Report	Head Writers: Barry Julien, Tom Purcell; Writers: Michael Brumm, Stephen Colbert, Rich Dahm, Rob Dubbin, Glenn Eichler, Peter Grosz, Peter Gwinn, Jay Katsir, Frank Lesser, Opus Moreschi, Meredith Scardino, Allison Silverman, and Max Werner	Comedy Central	
2009 (62nd)	Real Time with Bill Maher	Head Writer: Billy Martin; Writers: Scott Carter, Adam Felber, Matt Gunn, Brian Jacobsmeyer, Jay Jaroch, Chris Kelly, Bill Maher, Jonathan Schmock, and Danny Vermont	HBO	
2009 (62nd)	The Tonight Show with Conan O'Brien	Head Writer: Mike Sweeney; Writers: Chris Albers, Jose Arroyo, Josh Comers, Dan Cronin, Kevin Dorff, Andres du Bouchet, Michael Gordon, Berkley Johnson, Brian Kiley, Rob Kutner, Todd Levin, Brian McCann, Guy Nicolucci, Conan O'Brien, Matt O'Brien, Andy Richter, Brian Stack, and Andrew Weinberg	NBC	

=== 2010s ===
Year	Program	Writer(s)	Network	Ref.
2010 (63rd)	The Colbert Report	Barry Julien, Dan Guterman, Eric Drysdale, Frank Lesser, Glenn Eichler, Jay Katsir, Max Werner, Meredith Scardino, Michael Brumm, Opus Moreschi, Peter Gwinn, Rich Dahm, Rob Dubbin, Scott Sherman, Stephen Colbert, and Tom Purcell	Comedy Central	
2010 (63rd)	The Daily Show with Jon Stewart	Rory Albanese, Kevin Bleyer, Richard Blomquist, Steve Bodow, Tim Carvell, Wyatt Cenac, Hallie Haglund, J. R. Havlan, Elliott Kalan, Josh Lieb, Sam Means, Jo Miller, John Oliver, Daniel Radosh, Jason Ross, and Jon Stewart	Comedy Central	
2010 (63rd)	Penn & Teller: Bullshit!	Penn Jillette, Teller, Star Price, David Wechter, Michael Goudeau, Steve Melcher, Tom Kramer, and Rich Nathanson	Showtime	
2010 (63rd)	Saturday Night Live	Head Writer: Seth Meyers; Writers: Doug Abeles, James Anderson, Alex Baze, Jillian Bell, Hannibal Buress, Jessica Conrad, James Downey, Steve Higgins, Colin Jost, Erik Kenward, Jessi Klein, Rob Klein, John Lutz, Seth Meyers, Lorne Michaels, John Mulaney, Christine Nangle, Michael Patrick O'Brien, Paula Pell, Ryan Perez, Simon Rich, Marika Sawyer, Akiva Schaffer, John Solomon, Emily Spivey, Kent Sublette, Jorma Taccone, and Bryan Tucker	NBC	
2011 (64th)	The Colbert Report	Michael Brumm, Stephen Colbert, Rich Dahm, Paul Dinello, Eric Drysdale, Rob Dubbin, Glenn Eichler, Dan Guterman, Peter Gwinn, Jay Katsir, Barry Julien, Frank Lesser, Opus Moreschi, Tom Purcell, Meredith Scardino, Scott Sherman, and Max Werner	Comedy Central	
2011 (64th)	Conan	Jose Arroyo, Andres du Bouchet, Deon Cole, Josh Comers, Dan Cronin, Michael Gordon, Berkley Johnson, Brian Kiley, Laurie Kilmartin, Rob Kutner, Todd Levin, Brian McCann, Conan O'Brien, Matt O'Brien, Jesse Popp, Andy Richter, Frank Smiley, Brian Stack, and Mike Sweeney	TBS	
2011 (64th)	The Daily Show with Jon Stewart	Rory Albanese, Kevin Bleyer, Richard Blomquist, Steve Bodow, Tim Carvell, Wyatt Cenac, Hallie Haglund, J. R. Havlan, Elliott Kalan, Dan McCoy, Sam Means, Jo Miller, John Oliver, Zhubin Parang, Daniel Radosh, Jason Ross, and Jon Stewart	Comedy Central	
2011 (64th)	Jon Benjamin Has a Van	Leo Allen and Jon Benjamin	Comedy Central	
2011 (64th)	Late Night with Jimmy Fallon	Head Writer: A. D. Miles; Writers: David Angelo, Patrick Borelli, Gerard Bradford, Jeremy Bronson, Mike DiCenzo, Jimmy Fallon, John Haskell, Eric Ledgin, Dan Opsal, Amy Ozols, Gavin Purcell, Diallo Riddle, Jon Rineman, Bashir Salahuddin, Justin Shanes, Michael Shoemaker, Jen Statsky, and CJ Toledano	NBC	
2011 (64th)	Real Time with Bill Maher	Scott Carter, Adam Felber, Matt Gunn, Brian Jacobsmeyer, Jay Jaroch, Chris Kelly, Bill Maher, Billy Martin, and Amani Redd	HBO	
2011 (64th)	Saturday Night Live	Head Writer: Seth Meyers; Writers: Doug Abeles, James Anderson, Alex Baze, Heather Anne Campbell, Matt Craig, Jessica Conrad, James Downey, Tom Flanigan, Shelly Gossman, Steve Higgins, Colin Jost, Zach Kanin, Chris Kelly, Erik Kenward, Rob Klein, Jonathan Krisel, Lorne Michaels, John Mulaney, Christine Nangle, Michael Patrick O'Brien, Paula Pell, Simon Rich, Marika Sawyer, Akiva Schaffer, Sarah Schneider, Pete Schultz, John Solomon, Kent Sublette, Jorma Taccone, and Bryan Tucker	NBC	
2012 (65th)	Portlandia	Fred Armisen, Carrie Brownstein, Karey Dornetto, Jonathan Krisel, and Bill Oakley	IFC	
2012 (65th)	The Colbert Report	Michael Brumm, Stephen Colbert, Rich Dahm, Paul Dinello, Eric Drysdale, Rob Dubbin, Glenn Eichler, Dan Guterman, Peter Gwinn, Barry Julien, Jay Katsir, Frank Lesser, Opus Moreschi, Tom Purcell, Meredith Scardino, Scott Sherman, and Max Werner	Comedy Central	
2012 (65th)	Conan	Jose Arroyo, Andres du Bouchet, Deon Cole, Josh Comers, Dan Cronin, Michael Gordon, Brian Kiley, Laurie Kilmartin, Rob Kutner, Todd Levin, Brian McCann, Conan O'Brien, Matt O'Brien, Jesse Popp, Andy Richter, Brian Stack, and Mike Sweeney	TBS	
2012 (65th)	The Daily Show with Jon Stewart	Rory Albanese, Kevin Bleyer, Richard Blomquist, Steve Bodow, Tim Carvell, Hallie Haglund, J. R. Havlan, Elliott Kalan, Dan McCoy, Jo Miller, John Oliver, Zhubin Parang, Daniel Radosh, Jason Ross, Lauren Sarver, and Jon Stewart	Comedy Central	
2012 (65th)	Jimmy Kimmel Live!	Tony Barbieri, Jonathan Bines, Joelle Boucai, Sal Iacono, Eric Immerman, Gary Greenberg, Josh Halloway, Bess Kalb, Jimmy Kimmel, Jeff Loveness, Molly McNearney, Bryan Paulk, Danny Ricker, and Rick Rosner	ABC	
2012 (65th)	Key & Peele	Jay Martel, Ian Roberts, Keegan-Michael Key, Jordan Peele, Sean Conroy, Colton Dunn, Charlie Sanders, Alex Rubens, and Rebecca Drysdale	Comedy Central	
2012 (65th)	Real Time with Bill Maher	Scott Carter, Adam Felber, Matt Gunn, Brian Jacobsmeyer, Jay Jaroch, Chris Kelly, Mike Larsen, Bill Maher, and Billy Martin	HBO	
2012 (65th)	Saturday Night Live	Head Writer: Seth Meyers; Writers: James Anderson, Alex Baze, Neil Casey, Jessica Conrad, James Downey, Shelly Gossman, Steve Higgins, Colin Jost, Zach Kanin, Chris Kelly, Joe Kelly, Erik Kenward, Rob Klein, Lorne Michaels, John Mulaney, Christine Nangle, Mike O'Brien, Josh Patten, Paula Pell, Marika Sawyer, Sarah Schneider, Pete Schultz, John Solomon, Kent Sublette, and Bryan Tucker; Additional Sketch by Emily Spivey and Jorma Taccone; Additional Material by Frank Sebastiano	NBC	
2013 (66th)	The Colbert Report	Stephen Colbert, Tom Purcell, Michael Brumm, Nate Charny, Rich Dahm, Paul Dinello, Eric Drysdale, Rob Dubbin, Glenn Eichler, Dan Guterman, Barry Julien, Jay Katsir, Frank Lesser, Opus Moreschi, Bobby Mort, Meredith Scardino, and Max Werner	Comedy Central	
2013 (66th)	Conan	Jose Arroyo, Andres du Bouchet, Scott Chernoff, Deon Cole, Josh Comers, Dan Cronin, Scott Gairdner, Michael Gordon, Brian Kiley, Laurie Kilmartin, Rob Kutner, Todd Levin, Conan O'Brien, Matt O'Brien, Jesse Popp, Andy Richter, Brian Stack, and Mike Sweeney	TBS	
2013 (66th)	The Daily Show with Jon Stewart	Head Writer: Tim Carvell; Writers: Rory Albanese, Steve Bodow, Travon Free, Hallie Haglund, J. R. Havlan, Elliott Kalan, Matt Koff, Dan McCoy, Jo Miller, John Oliver, Zhubin Parang, Daniel Radosh, Jason Ross, Lauren Sarver, and Jon Stewart	Comedy Central	
2013 (66th)	Jimmy Kimmel Live!	Tony Barbieri, Jonathan Bines, Joelle Boucai, Gary Greenberg, Josh Halloway, Sal Iacono, Eric Immerman, Bess Kalb, Jimmy Kimmel, Jeff Loveness, Molly McNearney, Bryan Paulk, Danny Ricker, and Rick Rosner	ABC	
2013 (66th)	Portlandia	Fred Armisen, Carrie Brownstein, Jonathan Krisel, and Bill Oakley	IFC	
2013 (66th)	Saturday Night Live	Head Writers: Seth Meyers and Colin Jost; Writers: James Anderson, Alex Baze, Neil Casey, James Downey, Steve Higgins, Zach Kanin, Chris Kelly, Joe Kelly, Erik Kenward, Rob Klein, Lorne Michaels, John Mulaney, Mike O'Brien, Josh Patten, Paula Pell, Marika Sawyer, Sarah Schneider, Pete Schultz, John Solomon, Kent Sublette, and Bryan Tucker	NBC	
2014 (67th)	Last Week Tonight with John Oliver	Kevin Avery, Tim Carvell, Dan Gurewitch, Geoff Haggerty, Jeff Maurer, John Oliver, Scott Sherman, Will Tracy, Jill Twiss, and Juli Weiner	HBO	
2014 (67th)	The Colbert Report	Michael Brumm, Nate Charny, Aaron Cohen, Stephen Colbert, Rich Dahm, Paul Dinello, Eric Drysdale, Rob Dubbin, Ariel Dumas, Glenn Eichler, Gabe Gronli, Barry Julien, Jay Katsir, Sam Kim, Matt Lappin, Opus Moreschi, Tom Purcell, Meredith Scardino, and Max Werner	Comedy Central	
2014 (67th)	The Daily Show with Jon Stewart	Rory Albanese, Dan Amira, Steve Bodow, Tim Carvell, Travon Free, Hallie Haglund, J. R. Havlan, Elliott Kalan, Matt Koff, Adam Lowitt, Dan McCoy, Jo Miller, John Oliver, Zhubin Parang, Owen Parsons, Daniel Radosh, Lauren Sarver, Jon Stewart, and Delaney Yeager	Comedy Central	
2014 (67th)	Inside Amy Schumer	Head Writer: Jessi Klein; Writers: Emily Altman, Jeremy Beiler, Neil Casey, Kyle Dunnigan, Kurt Metzger, Christine Nangle, Dan Powell, and Amy Schumer	Comedy Central	
2014 (67th)	Jimmy Kimmel Live!	Head Writers: Molly McNearney, Danny Ricker, and Gary Greenberg; Writers: Jack Allison, Tony Barbieri, Jonathan Bines, Joelle Boucai, Josh Halloway, Sal Iacono, Eric Immerman, Bess Kalb, Jimmy Kimmel, Jeff Loveness, Bryan Paulk, Rick Rosner, and Bridger Winegar	ABC	
2014 (67th)	Real Time with Bill Maher	Head Writer: Billy Martin; Writers: Scott Carter, Adam Felber, Matt Gunn, Brian Jacobsmeyer, Jay Jaroch, Chris Kelly, Bill Maher, and Danny Vermont	HBO	
2014 (67th)	Saturday Night Live	Head Writers: Seth Meyers, Colin Jost, Rob Klein, and Bryan Tucker; Writers: James Anderson, Alex Baze, Michael Che, Mikey Day, Steve Higgins, Leslie Jones, Zach Kanin, Chris Kelly, Erik Kenward, Lorne Michaels, Claire Mulaney, Josh Patten, Paula Pell, Katie Rich, Tim Robinson, Sarah Schneider, Pete Schultz, John Solomon, Kent Sublette, and LaKendra Tookes	NBC	
2015 (68th)	Real Time with Bill Maher	Scott Carter, Adam Felber, Matt Gunn, Brian Jacobsmeyer, Jay Jaroch, Chris Kelly, Bill Maher, Billy Martin, and Danny Vermont	HBO	
2015 (68th)	Conan	Jose Arroyo, Josh Comers, Dan Cronin, Andres du Bouchet, Jessie Gaskell, Michael Gordon, Brian Kiley, Laurie Kilmartin, Rob Kutner, Todd Levin, Levi MacDougall, Conan O'Brien, Matt O'Brien, Andy Richter, Frank Smiley, Brian Stack, and Mike Sweeney	TBS	
2015 (68th)	The Daily Show with Jon Stewart	Dan Amira, Steve Bodow, Travon Free, Hallie Haglund, Elliott Kalan, Matt Koff, Adam Lowitt, Dan McCoy, Jo Miller, Zhubin Parang, Owen Parsons, Daniel Radosh, Lauren Sarver, Jon Stewart, and Delaney Yeager	Comedy Central	
2015 (68th)	The Late Show with Stephen Colbert	Michael Brumm, Nate Charny, Aaron Cohen, Stephen Colbert, Cullen Crawford, Paul Dinello, Eric Drysdale, Rob Dubbin, Ariel Dumas, Glenn Eichler, Gabe Gronli, Barry Julien, Jay Katsir, Daniel Kibblesmith, Matt Lappin, Opus Moreschi, Tom Purcell, Jen Spyra, and Brian Stack	CBS	
2015 (68th)	The Tonight Show Starring Jimmy Fallon	Jonathan Adler, Patrick Borelli, Gerard Bradford, Luke Cunningham, Mike DiCenzo, Mike Drucker, Jess Dweck, Dicky Eagan, Caroline Eppright, Jimmy Fallon, John Haskell, J.R. Havlan, Josh Lieb, Arthur Meyer, A.D. Miles, Chase Mitchell, Dan Opsal, Gavin Purcell, Jon Rineman, Albertina Rizzo, and David Young	NBC	
2016 (69th)	Last Week Tonight with John Oliver	Kevin Avery, Tim Carvell, Josh Gondelman, Dan Gurewitch, Geoff Haggerty, Jeff Maurer, John Oliver, Scott Sherman, Will Tracy, Jill Twiss, and Juli Weiner	HBO	
2016 (69th)	The Daily Show with Trevor Noah	Dan Amira, David Angelo, Steve Bodow, Devin Delliquanti, Zach DiLanzo, Travon Free, Hallie Haglund, David Kibuuka, Matt Koff, Adam Lowitt, Dan McCoy, Lauren Sarver Means, Trevor Noah, Joe Opio, Zhubin Parang, Owen Parson, Daniel Radosh, and Michelle Wolf	Comedy Central	
2016 (69th)	Late Night with Seth Meyers	Jermaine Affonso, Alex Baze, Bryan Donaldson, Sal Gentile, Matt Goldich, Jenny Hagel, Allison Hord, Mike Karnell, Andrew Law, John Lutz, Aparna Nancherla, Chioke Nassor, Seth Meyers, Ian Morgan, Conner O'Malley, Seth Reiss, Amber Ruffin, Mike Scollins, Mike Shoemaker, Ben Warheit, and Michelle Wolf	NBC	
2016 (69th)	The Late Show with Stephen Colbert	Mike Brumm, Nate Charny, Aaron Cohen, Stephen Colbert, Cullen Crawford, Paul Dinello, Eric Drysdale, Ariel Dumas, Glenn Eichler, Gabe Gronli, Barry Julien, Jay Katsir, Daniel Kibblesmith, Matt Lappin, Opus Moreschi, Tom Purcell, Jen Spyra, and Brian Stack	CBS	
2017 (70th)	Last Week Tonight with John Oliver	Tim Carvell, Josh Gondelman, Dan Gurewitch, Geoff Haggerty, Jeff Maurer, John Oliver, Scott Sherman, Will Tracy, Jill Twiss, Juli Weiner, Ben Silva, and Seena Vali	HBO	
2017 (70th)	Conan	Matt O'Brien; Writers: Jose Arroyo, Daniel Cronin, Andres du Bouchet, Jessie Gaskell, Michael Gordon, Brian Kiley, Laurie Kilmartin, Leah Krinsky, Rob Kutner, Todd Levin, Levi MacDougall, Conan O'Brien, Andy Richter, Frank Smiley, and Mike Sweeney	TBS	
2017 (70th)	The Daily Show with Trevor Noah	Dan Amira, David Angelo, Steve Bodow, Kashana Cauley, Devin Delliquanti, Zach DiLanzo, Hallie Haglund, David Kibuuka, Matt Koff, Adam Lowitt, Dan McCoy, Lauren Sarver-Means, Trevor Noah, Joe Opio, Zhubin Parang, Owen Parsons, Daniel Radosh, and Michelle Wolf	Comedy Central	
2017 (70th)	Full Frontal with Samantha Bee	Samantha Bee, Ashley Nicole Black, Pat Cassels, Eric Drysdale, Mathan Erhardt, Travon Free, Joe Grossman, Miles Kahn, Jo Miller, Jason Reich, and Melinda Taub	TBS	
2017 (70th)	The Jim Jefferies Show	Head Writer: Jason Reich; Writers: Jim Jefferies, Subhah Agarwal, Kevin Avery, Curtis Cook, Lucas Kavner, Matt Kirshen, Chris McKinley, Bryan Olsen, Laura Willcox, JJ Whitehead, and Scott Y. Zabielski	Comedy Central	
2017 (70th)	Jimmy Kimmel Live!	Jimmy Kimmel, Tony Barbieri, Jonathan Bines, Joelle Boucai, Gonzalo Cordova, Devin Field, Gary Greenberg, Josh Halloway, Sal Iacono, Eric Immerman, Jesse Joyce, Bess Kalb, Jeff Loveness, Molly McNearney, CeCe Pleasants, Danny Ricker, and Joe Strazzullo	ABC	
2017 (70th)	Late Night with Seth Meyers	Jermaine Affonso, Alex Baze, Bryan Donaldson, Sal Gentile, Matt Goldich, Dina Gusovsky, Jenny Hagel, Allison Hord, Mike Karnell, John Lutz, Seth Meyers, Ian Morgan, Seth Reiss, Amber Ruffin, Mike Scollins, Mike Shoemaker, and Ben Warheit	NBC	
2017 (70th)	Real Time with Bill Maher	Scott Carter, Adam Felber, Matt Gunn, Brian Jacobsmeyer, Jay Jaroch, Chris Kelly, Bill Maher, Billy Martin, Bob Oschack, and Danny Vermont	HBO	
2018 (71st)	Last Week Tonight with John Oliver	Tim Carvell, Raquel D'Apice, Josh Gondelman, Dan Gurewitch, Jeff Maurer, Daniel O'Brien, John Oliver, Brian Parise, Owen Parsons, Ben Silva, Will Tracy, Jill Twiss, Seena Vali, and Juli Weiner	HBO	
2018 (71st)	Full Frontal with Samantha Bee	Kristen Bartlett, Samantha Bee, Ashley Nicole Black, Pat Cassels, Mike Drucker, Eric Drysdale, Mathan Erhardt, Joe Grossman, Miles Kahn, Nicole Silverberg, and Melinda Taub	TBS	
2018 (71st)	Late Night with Seth Meyers	Supervising Writers: Sal Gentile and Seth Reiss; Writers: Jermaine Affonso, Alex Baze, Bryan Donaldson, Matt Goldich, Dina Gusovsky, Jenny Hagel, Allison Hord, Mike Karnell, John Lutz, Seth Meyers, Ian Morgan, Amber Ruffin, Mike Scollins, and Mike Shoemaker	NBC	
2018 (71st)	The Late Show with Stephen Colbert	Head Writers: Jay Katsir and Opus Moreschi; Writers: Emmy Blotnick, Mike Brumm, Aaron Cohen, Stephen Colbert, Cullen Crawford, Paul Dinello, Ariel Dumas, Glenn Eichler, Django Gold, Gabe Gronli, Greg Iwinski, Barry Julien, Daniel Kibblesmith, Matt Lappin, Michael Pielocik, Kate Sidley, Jen Spyra, Brian Stack, and John Thibodeaux	CBS	
2019 (72nd)	Last Week Tonight with John Oliver	Dan Gurewitch, Jeff Maurer, Jill Twiss, Juli Weiner; Writers: Daniel O'Brien, Tim Carvell, John Oliver, Owen Parsons, Charlie Redd, Joanna Rothkopf, Ben Silva, and Seena Vali	HBO	
2019 (72nd)	Conan	Head writer: Matt O'Brien; Writers: Jose Arroyo, Glenn Boozan, Daniel Cronin, Andres du Bouchet, Conan O'Brien, Jessie Gaskell, Brian Kiley, Laurie Kilmartin, Todd Levin, Levi MacDougall, Andy Richter, Frank Smiley, and Mike Sweeney.	TBS	
2019 (72nd)	Full Frontal with Samantha Bee	Head writer: Melinda Taub; Supervising writers: Joe Grossman, Nicole Silverberg; Writers: Samantha Bee, Kristen Bartlett, Pat Cassels, Sean Crespo, Mike Drucker, Mathan Erhardt, Miles Kahn, Sahar Rizvi; Special contributor: Allison Silverman.	TBS	
2019 (72nd)	The Late Late Show with James Corden	Demi Adejuyigbe, James Corden, Rob Crabbe, Lawrence Dai, Nate Fernald, Caroline Goldfarb, Olivia Harewood, David Javerbaum, Ian Karmel, John Kennedy, Kayleigh Lamb, James Longman, Jared Moskowitz, CeCe Pleasants, Tim Siedell, Benjamin Stout, Tom Thriveni, Louis Waymouth, and Ben Winston.	CBS	
2019 (72nd)	Late Night with Seth Meyers	Supervising Writers: Sal Gentile, Seth Reiss; Writers: Jermaine Affonso, Alex Baze, Karen Chee, Bryan Donaldson, Matt Goldich, Dina Gusovsky, Jenny Hagel, Allison Hord, Mike Karnell, John Lutz, Seth Meyers, Ian Morgan, Amber Ruffin, Mike Scollins, Mike Shoemaker, and Ben Warheit.	NBC	
2019 (72nd)	The Late Show with Stephen Colbert	Head Writers: Jay Katsir, Opus Moreschi; Writers: Michael Brumm, River Clegg, Aaron Cohen, Stephen Colbert, Paul Dinello, Ariel Dumas, Glenn Eichler, Django Gold, Gabe Gronli, Greg Iwinski, Barry Julien, Daniel Kibblesmith, Eliana Kwartler, Matt Lappin, Asher Perlman, Tom Purcell, Kate Sidley, Jen Spyra, Brian Stack, and John Thibodeaux.	CBS	

=== 2020s ===
Year	Program	Writer(s)	Network	Ref.
2020 (73rd)	Desus & Mero	Daniel "Desus Nice" Baker, Claire Friedman, Ziwe Fumudoh, Josh Gondelman, Robert Kornhauser, Joel "The Kid Mero" Martinez, Heben Nigatu, Mike Pielocik, Julia Young	Showtime	
2020 (73rd)	Full Frontal with Samantha Bee	Kristen Bartlett, Samantha Bee, Pat Cassels, Sean Crespo, Mike Drucker, Mathan Erhardt, Joe Grossman, Miles Kahn, Sahar Rizvi, Chris Thompson, Holly Walker, Allison Silverman	TBS	
2020 (73rd)	Last Week Tonight with John Oliver	Johnathan Appel, Ali Barthwell, Tim Carvell, Liz Hynes, Greg Iwinski, Mark Kramer, Daniel O'Brien, John Oliver, Owen Parsons, Charlie Redd, Joanna Rothkopf, Chrissy Shackelford, Ben Silva, Seena Vali	HBO	
2020 (73rd)	Late Night with Seth Meyers	Alex Baze, Seth Reiss, Closer Look, Sal Gentile, Jermaine Affonso, Karen Chee, Bryan Donaldson, Matt Goldich, Dina Gusovsky, Jenny Hagel, Allison Hord, Mike Karnell, John Lutz, Seth Meyers, Ian Morgan, John Mulaney, Amber Ruffin, Mike Scollins, Mike Shoemaker, Ben Warheit, Jeff Wright	NBC	
2020 (73rd)	The Late Show with Stephen Colbert	Ariel Dumas, Jay Katsir, Writers: Delmonte Bent, Michael Brumm, River Clegg, Aaron Cohen, Nicole Conlan, Stephen T. Colbert, Paul Dinello, Glenn Eichler, Django Gold, Gabe Gronli, Barry Julien, Michael Cruz Kayne, Eliana Kwartler, Matt Lappin, Felipe Torres Medina, Opus Moreschi, Asher Perlman, Tom Purcell, Kate Sidley, Brian Stack, John Thibodeaux, Steve Waltien	CBS	
2021 (74th)	Conan	Matt O'Brien; Writers: Jose Arroyo, Glenn Boozan, Daniel Cronin, Andres du Bouchet, Jessie Gaskell, Skyler Higley, Brian Kiley, Laurie Kilmartin, Todd Levin, Levi MacDougall, Conan O'Brien, Andy Richter, Frank Smiley, Mike Sweeney	TBS	
2021 (74th)	Desus & Mero	Daniel "Desus Nice" Baker, Josh Gondelman, Robert Kornhauser, Joel "The Kid Mero" Martinez, Robert A. McRae, Heben Nigatu, Mike Pielocik, Julia Young	Showtime	
2021 (74th)	Last Week Tonight with John Oliver	Johnathan Appel, Ali Barthwell, Tim Carvell, Liz Hynes, Greg Iwinski, Mark Kramer, Daniel O'Brien, John Oliver, Owen Parsons, Charlie Redd, Joanna Rothkopf, Chrissy Shackelford, Ben Silva, Seena Vali	HBO	
2021 (74th)	The Problem with Jon Stewart	Chelsea Devantez; Kristen Acimovic, Henrik Blix, Rob Christensen, Jay Jurden, Alexa Loftus, Tocarra Mallard, Robby Slowik, Jon Stewart, Kasaun Wilson	Apple TV+	
2022 (75th)	Last Week Tonight with John Oliver	Johnathan Appel, Ali Barthwell, Tim Carvell, Liz Hynes, Ryan Ken, Mark Kramer, Sofia Manfredi, Daniel O'Brien, John Oliver, Owen Parsons, Taylor Kay Phillips, Charlie Redd, Joanna Rothkopf, Chrissy Shackelford, Seena Vali	HBO	
2022 (75th)	Full Frontal with Samantha Bee	Kristen Bartlett, Samantha Bee, Pat Cassels, Sean Alexander Crespo, Mike Drucker, Joe Grossman, Miles Kahn, Sahar Rizvi, Michael Rhoa, Chris Thompson, Holly Walker, Alison Zeidman	TBS	
2022 (75th)	Hell of A Week with Charlamagne tha God	Cynia Barnwell, Josh Lieb, Charles McBee, Dan McCoy, Lenard McKelvey, Andre D. Thompson	Comedy Central	
2022 (75th)	Jimmy Kimmel Live!	Jamie Abrahams, Rory Albanese, Tony Barbieri, Jonathan Bines, Joelle Boucai, Bryan Cook, Blaire Erskine, Devin Field, Gary Greenberg, Josh Halloway, Eric Immerman, Jesse Joyce, Jimmy Kimmel, Greg Martin, Jesse McLaren, Molly McNearney, Keaton Patti, Danny Ricker, Louis Virtel, Troy Walker	ABC	
2022 (75th)	Late Night with Seth Meyers	Jermaine Affonso, Alex Baze, Karen Chee, Bryan Donaldson, Sal Gentile, Matt Goldich, Dina Gusovsky, Jenny Hagel, Allison Hord, Mike Karnell, John Lutz, Seth Meyers, Ian Morgan, Seth Reiss, Amber Ruffin, Mike Scollins, Mike Shoemaker, Ben Warheit, Jeff Wright	NBC	
2022 (75th)	The Problem with Jon Stewart	Kristen Acimovic, Henrik Blix, Rob Christensen, Jay Jurden, Alexa Loftus, Tocarra Mallard, Maria Randazzo, Robby Slowik, Jon Stewart, Kasaun Wilson	Apple TV+	
2022 (75th)	Stephen Colbert Presents Tooning Out the News	Addison Anderson, Sarah Caldwell, Stephen Colbert, R.J. Fried, Julie Greiner, Mike Leech, Ron Metellus, Bob Powers, Libby Schreiner, Zach Smilovitz, Hannah Wright	Comedy Central	
2023 (76th)	Last Week Tonight with John Oliver	Johnathan Appel, Ali Barthwell, Tim Carvell, Liz Hynes, Ryan Ken, Mark Kramer, Sofia Manfredi, Daniel O'Brien, John Oliver, Owen Parsons, Taylor Kay Phillips, Charlie Redd, Joanna Rothkopf, Chrissy Shackelford, Seena Vali	HBO	
2023 (76th)	The Daily Show	Dan Amira, David Angelo, Nicole Conlan, Devin Delliquanti, Anthony DeVito, Zach DiLanzo, Jen Flanz, Jason Gilbert, Dina Hashem, Scott Hercman, Josh Johnson, David Kibuuka, Matt Koff, Lenny Marcus, Joseph Opio, Randall Otis, Zhubin Parang, Kat Radley, Daniel Radosh, Lanee Sanders, Lauren Sarver Means, Scott Sherman, Ashton Womack, Sophie Zucker	Comedy Central	
2023 (76th)	Jimmy Kimmel Live!	Jamie Abrahams, Rory Albanese, Tony Barbieri, Jonathan Bines, Joelle Boucai, Bryan Cook, Blaire Erskine, Devin Field, Gary Greenberg, Josh Halloway, Eric Immerman, Jesse Joyce, Jimmy Kimmel, Greg Martin, Jesse McLaren, Molly McNearney, Keaton Patti, Danny Ricker, Louis Virtel, Troy Walker	ABC	
2023 (76th)	Late Night with Seth Meyers	Jermaine Affonso, Alex Baze, Karen Chee, Bryan Donaldson, Sal Gentile, Matt Goldich, Dina Gusovsky, Jenny Hagel, Allison Hord, Mike Karnell, John Lutz, Seth Meyers, Ian Morgan, Seth Reiss, Amber Ruffin, Mike Scollins, Mike Shoemaker, Ben Warheit, Jeff Wright	NBC	
2023 (76th)	The Late Show with Stephen Colbert	Ariel Dumas, Jay Katsir; Writers: Delmonte Bent, Michael Brumm, Aaron Cohen, Stephen Colbert, Paul Dinello, Glenn Eichler, Gabe Gronli, Barry Julien, Michael Cruz Kayne, Eliana Kwartler, Matt Lapin, Caroline Lazar, Pratima Mani, Carlos Felipe Torres Medina, Opus Moreschi, Carley Moseley, Asher Perlman, Michael Pielocik, Tom Purcell, Kate Sidley, Brian Stack, John Thibodeaux, Steve Waltien	CBS	
2023 (76th)	The Problem with Jon Stewart	Kristen Acimovic, Henrik Blix, Rob Christensen, Jay Jurden, Alexa Loftus, Tocarra Mallard, Maria Randazzo, Robby Slowik, Jon Stewart, Kasaun Wilson	Apple TV+	
2024 (77th)	Last Week Tonight with John Oliver	Johnathan Appel, Ali Barthwell, Tim Carvell, Liz Hynes, Ryan Ken, Mark Kramer, Sofia Manfredi, Daniel O'Brien, John Oliver, Owen Parsons, Taylor Kay Phillips, Charlie Redd, Joanna Rothkopf, Chrissy Shackelford, Seena Vali	HBO	
2024 (77th)	The Daily Show	Dan Amira, David Angelo, Nicole Conlan, Devin Delliquanti, Zach DiLanzo, Jen Flanz, Jason Gilbert, Dina Hashem, Scott Hercman, Josh Johnson, David Kibuuka, Matt Koff, Lenny Marcus, Joe Opio, Randall Otis, Zhubin Parang, Kat Radley, Daniel Radosh, Lanee Sanders, Lauren Sarver Means, Scott Sherman, Jon Stewart, Ashton Womack, Sophie Zucker	Comedy Central	
2024 (77th)	John Mulaney Presents: Everybody's in LA	Anna Drezen, David Ferguson, Fran Gillespie, Langston Kerman, Jeremy Levick, John Mulaney, Alex Scordelis, Rajat Suresh	Netflix	
2024 (77th)	The Kelly Clarkson Show	Kevin Hurley, Nik Robinson, Jordan Watland	Syndicated	
2024 (77th)	Saturday Night Live	Head Writers: Alison Gates, Streeter Seidell, Kent Sublette; Writers: Rosebud Baker, Dan Bulla, Megan Callahan-Shah, Steven Castillo, Michael Che, Mike DiCenzo, Alex English, Jimmy Fowlie, Martin Herlihy, John Higgins, Steve Higgins, Vannessa Jackson, Colin Jost, Erik Kenward, Ben Marshall, Dennis McNicholas, Lorne Michaels, Jake Nordwind, Ceara O’Sullivan, Josh Patten, Gary Richardson, Pete Schultz, KC Shornima, Asha Ward, Auguste White, Celeste Yim	NBC	
2025 (78th)	Last Week Tonight with John Oliver	Owen Parsons, Charlie Redd, Joanna Rothkopf, Seena Vali, Johnathan Appel, Ali Barthwell, Tim Carvell, Liz Hynes, Ryan Ken, Sofía Manfredi, John Oliver, Taylor Kay Phillips, Chrissy Shackelford	HBO	
2025 (78th)	The Daily Show	Dan Amira, Lauren Sarver Means, Daniel Radosh, David Angelo, Nicole Conlan, Devin Delliquanti, Zach DiLanzo, Jen Flanz, Jason Gilbert, Dina Hashem, Scott Hercman, Josh Johnson, David Kibuuka, Matt Koff, Matt O'Brien, Joe Opio, Randall Otis, Zhubin Parang, Kat Radley, Lanee' Sanders, Scott Sherman, Jon Stewart, Ashton Womack, Sophie Zucker	Comedy Central	
2025 (78th)	Have I Got News for You	Mason Steinberg, Kris Acimovic, Jim Biederman, Daniel Chamberlain, Jodi Lennon, Michael Pielocik, Jill Twiss	CNN	
2025 (78th)	Late Night with Seth Meyers	Alex Baze, Seth Reiss, Mike Scollins, Sal Gentile, Jermaine Affonso, Bryan Donaldson, Matt Goldich, Jenny Hagel, John Lutz, Seth Meyers, Amber Ruffin, Mike Shoemaker, Ben Warheit, Jeff Wright	NBC	
2025 (78th)	Saturday Night Live	Alison Gates, Erik Kenward, Streeter Seidell, Kent Sublette, Bryan Tucker, Dan Bulla, Will Stephen, Auguste White, Celeste Yim, Steven Castillo, Michael Che, Mike DiCenzo, Jimmy Fowlie, Sudi Green, Martin Herlihy, John Higgins, Steve Higgins, Colin Jost, Allie Levitan, Ben Marshall, Lorne Michaels, Jake Nordwind, Ceara O'Sullivan, Moss Perricone, Carl Tart, Asha Ward, Pete Schultz, Rosebud Baker, Megan Callahan-Shah, Dennis McNicholas, Josh Patten, KC Shornima	NBC	
2025 (78th)	They Call It Late Night with Jason Kelce	Jon Glaser, Andy Blitz, Kevin Dorff, Tami Sagher	ESPN	

== Submission guidelines ==
According to the Writers Guild of America's official rules for the Comedy/Variety Talk Series category, the names included in the nominations are those of every writer who participated in at least 25% of all episodes telecast during the eligibility period for a particular program. Nominees are chosen based on a submission of five sketches and/or monologues that best represent a series' overall quality of writing. Until 2015, the award was called the "Comedy/Variety (Including Talk) Series Award," including both talk shows and sketch comedies. Starting with the 68th Writers Guild of America Awards, the category was split into two separate awards: the "Comedy/Variety Talk Series Award" for programs that are primarily composed of monologue jokes, desk segments, and guest interviews, and the "Comedy/Variety Sketch Series Award" for programs that primarily consist of scripted sketches. The rule change allows for series like Saturday Night Live and Portlandia to compete against shows similar to their structure rather than late-night talk shows that are presented in a different format.

== Total awards ==
- NBC – 9
- HBO – 8
- Comedy Central – 5
- IFC – 1
- Showtime – 1

== Programs with multiple awards ==
6 awards

- Late Night with Conan O'Brien (NBC)

9 awards

- Last Week Tonight with John Oliver (HBO)

4 awards

- The Colbert Report (Comedy Central)

3 awards

- Saturday Night Live (NBC)

2 awards

- Dennis Miller Live (HBO)

== Programs with multiple nominations ==
15 nominations

- The Daily Show (Comedy Central)

14 nominations

- Saturday Night Live (NBC)

12 nominations

- Late Night with Conan O'Brien (NBC)
- Real Time with Bill Maher (HBO)

11 nominations

- Last Week Tonight with John Oliver (HBO)

8 nominations

- The Colbert Report (Comedy Central)
- Late Night with Seth Meyers (NBC)

7 nominations

- Conan (TBS)

6 nominations

- Jimmy Kimmel Live! (ABC)
- The Late Show with Stephen Colbert (CBS)
- Penn & Teller: Bullshit! (Showtime)

5 nominations

- Dennis Miller Live (HBO)
- Full Frontal with Samantha Bee (Comedy Central)
- Late Night with Seth Meyers (NBC)

4 nominations

- The Late Show with David Letterman (CBS)

3 nominations

- MADtv (Fox)
- The Problem with Jon Stewart (Apple TV+)

2 nominations

- Desus & Mero (Showtime)
- Politically Incorrect (ABC)
- Portlandia (IFC)
