= Richard G. Rosner =

American screenwriter

Rick Rosner
- Born: Richard G. Rosner; May 2, 1960 (age 65)
- Occupations: Writer, aspiring reality television personality
- Years active: 1987–present
- Television: Jimmy Kimmel Live!

Richard G. Rosner (born May 2, 1960) is an Emmy-nominated American television writer and reality television personality known for his alleged high intelligence test scores and his unusual career. There are alleged reports that he has achieved some of the highest scores ever recorded on IQ tests designed to measure exceptional intelligence. He has become known for taking part in activities not usually associated with geniuses. Rosner claims that he has worked as a stripper, roller-skating waiter, bouncer, and nude model. He has appeared in numerous documentaries and profiles about his activities and views. He has also appeared in both a Domino's Pizza commercial as well as one for Burger King and sued the quiz show Who Wants to Be a Millionaire over an allegedly flawed question he missed as a contestant in 2000. He wrote and produced for quiz shows and several programs produced by Jimmy Kimmel, including The Man Show, Crank Yankers, and Jimmy Kimmel Live!, receiving nominations for an Emmy award, as well as for multiple Writers Guild Awards for his work on the latter.

== Early life and education ==
Rosner grew up in Boulder, Colorado. He reportedly spent 10 years in high school, leaving in 1987. Rosner began working on a theory of everything around age 21, and had returned to high school at age 26 in order to have "one of those desk-chair combinations" in a quiet place to think about how the theory might work, drawing a comparison in an interview to Albert Einstein's Swiss patent office.

After he graduated from high school and attended University of Colorado, Boulder on and off, where he was a member of the Phi Kappa Tau fraternity, Rosner appeared as a body builder in early choreography by Nancy Daw Kane. As an aspiring media figure, he placed a number of ads with titles about physics in the entertainment trade journal Variety while attending college. Rosner moved to New York City and wrote for MTV. When his wife accepted a job offer in California, they moved west.

Although he is not practicing, Rosner identifies as Jewish.

== IQ tests ==
In 1985, he scored 44 of 48 on Ron Hoeflin's Mega Test, sufficient to gain entry into the Mega Society. The Mega Test is described in a history of IQ testing as "a nonstandardized test put out by an obscure group known as Mega, supposedly the world's most selective organization of geniuses." In 1991 he retook the test and achieved 47 of 48. From 1991 to 1997, Rosner was editor of Noesis, the journal of the Mega Society. Rick completed Hoeflin's Titan Test and is the first individual to have answered all 48 questions correctly.

No professionally designed and validated IQ test claims to distinguish test-takers at a one-in-a-million level of rarity of score. The standard score range of most currently normed IQ tests is from IQ 40 to IQ 160. A score of 160 corresponds to a rarity of about 1 person in 30,000 (leaving aside the issue of error of measurement common to all IQ tests), which falls short of the Mega Society's 1 in a million entry requirement. IQ scores above this level are dubious (pending additional research), as there are insufficient normative cases upon which to base a statistically justified rank-ordering. High IQ scores are less reliably reported than IQ scores nearer to the population mean due to the inherently volatile assessment parameters that come from the limited data availability. The Mega Test has been criticized by professional psychologists as improperly designed and scored, "nothing short of number pulverization". Neither the Titan nor Mega tests are considered useful to psychologists in their current format, owing to their lack of supervision and time limits. The Titan test is further criticised for having multiple similar and non independent questions. Both tests have been shown to significantly over-report IQ.

Taking after the clinical views and opinions of Dr. Howard Gardner, Rosner has argued that "the whole idea of IQ is a little wobbly" due to its attempt to measure linearly what he views as a property with many different aspects.

== Media activity and appearances ==
Rosner began writing for quiz shows in 1987 on the MTV series Remote Control. He then scripted a number of clip shows, countdowns, and outtake programs in the 1990s. Rosner's 2000 appearance on the quiz show Who Wants to Be a Millionaire led to a lawsuit over an allegedly flawed question he missed on the elevation of various country capitals. Rosner was asked, "What capital city is located at the highest altitude above sea level?" and given four answer choices: Mexico City, Quito, Bogotá, and Kathmandu. Rosner answered Kathmandu; Quito is 8% higher. Nonetheless, Rosner sued. Rosner's demand letter to the show insisted that a different city, not on the list of four answer choices, was the world's highest capital. The show responded that that did not matter.

"After reading your letters and reviewing our research, we continue to believe that the answer to your $16,000 question is correct," headquarters responded. "Of the four capital cities given as answer choices, Quito is the highest and, thus, is the correct answer. As you may remember, the Official Rules for the competition, as well as the Contestant Release and Eligibility Form that you signed, provide that the decisions of the judges relating to all aspects of the game, including questions and answers, are final. Under these circumstances, we do not believe that a return trip to the show is warranted in your case.

— Chotzinoff, Robin, Surrender, Regis (2000) (quoting response from Who Wants to Be a Millionaire?)

Rosner's letter-writing campaign and attempts to get brought back on the show led to his being profiled in the Errol Morris series First Person. Jimmy Kimmel later hired him as a writer, producer and occasional on-air talent. In 2008, he appeared in a Domino's Pizza ad for a line of oven-baked sandwiches. In April 2009 and August 2013, Rosner appeared on Bill Simmons' ESPN podcast The B.S. Report. In May 2009 Rosner was featured on an episode of A&E Television's Obsessed. The episode focused on his obsession with working out due to a fear of aging and dying.
