= Blaire Erskine =

American comedian and writer

- Born: August 25, 1991 (age 35)
- Education: Georgia State University

Comedy career
- Years active: 2017–present
- Medium: Stand-up, video
- Genre: Satire
- Subjects: Right-wing politics, current events

Blaire Erskine (born August 25, 1991) is an American comedian and writer. She is best known for her satirical Twitter videos spoofing various right-wing political figures and fictional Trump supporters. Erskine was a staff writer for Jimmy Kimmel Live!.

== Early life and education ==
Erskine was born on August 25, 1991. She was raised on a sod farm in Ellaville, Georgia. She moved to Atlanta in 2011 to attend Georgia State University and began taking improv classes.

== Career ==
Erskine pursued acting for two years before turning her focus to writing. She joined an all-women stand-up comedy class at The Punchline in 2017 and started doing open mics around Atlanta.

Erskine regularly performed stand-up comedy in Atlanta prior to the COVID-19 pandemic's social distancing requirements. She is also a contributing writer to Reductress and The List.

She rose to prominence in 2020 for posting satirical Twitter videos in response to current events, often posing as the wives and daughters of prominent right wing politicians and pundits and various Trump supporting characters. In her first viral video released in July 2020, she depicted the wife of Dan Maples, a Florida man who received media attention for refusing to wear a mask in Costco. Another viral video depicted her giving a fake news interview as a Trump supporter stranded in freezing temperatures after an Omaha, Nebraska rally, spoofing a real event that took place in October 2020. Celebrities such as Michael Moore, MC Hammer, and reporter Katie Couric responded to the video assuming it was real.

Characters she has played in her videos include Jerry Falwell's daughter, Amy Coney Barrett's daughter, Tom Cotton's wife, Corey Lewandowski's wife, Marjorie Taylor Greene's daughter, and Tiffany Trump's best friend. A.O. Scott of the New York Times referred to the videos as "small masterpieces, flawlessly capturing the attitudes and techniques we use when we’re alone with our phones."

Erskine used her platform to help raise $25,000 for Raphael Warnock and Jon Ossoff's 2020 Georgia Senate campaigns.

In December 2020, Erskine signed to the talent agency ICM Partners. In 2021 Erskine joined the writing staff of Jimmy Kimmel Live!. She continued to produce viral parody videos on her social media accounts, including one posing as a fictional spokesperson for Facebook, after a whistleblower came forward about the company's financial motives, and another as a spokesperson for ERCOT, in response to the electricity issues resulting from a heatwave in June. She left Jimmy Kimmel Live! in 2024.

== Personal life ==
Erskine married her husband in October 2020. They reside in Los Angeles, California.

== Filmography ==
Year	Title	Role	Notes
2011	Potemkin1711	Science Officer Allen	Episode: The Void
2017	Sides	Heidi	Web series; also creator, writer and executive producer
2021	Stargirl	Millie Myers	Episode: "Summer School: Chapter Four"
2021	Let's Be Real	N/A	Writer
2021–2024	Jimmy Kimmel Live!	Various	Writer
2023	American Auto	Christina	Episode: "Funeral"

== Awards and nominations ==
Year	Award	Category	Nominated work	Result	Ref.
2023	Writers Guild of America Awards	Comedy/Variety – Talk Series	Jimmy Kimmel Live!	Nominated	
