= Asher Perlman =

American comedian, writer, and cartoonist

- Born: Seattle, Washington, U.S.
- Education: Lawrence University (BA)
- Occupations: Writer, comedian, cartoonist
- Known for: Cartoonist, The New Yorker
- Website: ashermaxperlman.com

Asher Perlman is an American comedian, writer, and cartoonist. He is a cartoonist for The New Yorker and was a staff writer for The Late Show with Stephen Colbert, for which he won a 2026 Primetime Emmy Award for Outstanding Writing for a Variety Series.

== Life and career ==
Perlman was born in Seattle and lived there until his family relocated to his father's hometown of Madison, Wisconsin at age 11. He is Jewish. He enjoyed reading comics from childhood including The Far Side, Bloom County, Foxtrot, Calvin and Hobbes, and the work of Charles Addams. Partly influenced by his father, who is an artist, he enjoyed creative activities and theatre, and also studied improv at ComedySportz. Perlman attended Madison West High School.

He continued to perform theatre and improv as an undergraduate at Lawrence University, where he majored in political science. His interest in improv took him to Chicago after graduation, where he studied at IO Theater, the Second City, and Annoyance Theatre. He also performed with the Improvised Shakespeare Company and Second City's touring company.

In 2017 Perlman relocated to New York to work as a staff writer for The Opposition with Jordan Klepper. He is a staff writer for The Late Show with Stephen Colbert, for which he has been nominated for six Primetime Emmy Awards and won a Writers Guild of America Award.

Perlman is also a cartoonist for The New Yorker. Prior to 2020 he posted original cartoons to his Instagram, but began cartooning as a daily practice after the onset of the COVID-19 pandemic. He submitted several to The New Yorker each week and continued to share many on his Instagram and eventually they were accepted. His cartoons "often focus on modern life's awkwardness and faux pas." He released his debut book, a collection of cartoons called Well, This Is Me in June 2024 under Andrews McMeel. His second collection Hi, It's Me Again was released in 2025.

His time as a writer for the Late Show lasted until the finale in May 2026. He and another former staff writer, Michael Cruz Kayne, launched the comedy podcast But Also in June 2026.

Perlman lives in Brooklyn with his wife and their two dogs.

== Works ==
- 2024. "Well, This Is Me", United States, Andrews McMeel Publishing ISBN 9781524892050, publication date 18 June 2024
- 2025. "Hi, It's Me Again", United States, Andrews McMeel Publishing ISBN 9798881602581, publication date 2 September 2025

== Awards and nominations ==
Award	Year	Category	Nominated work	Result	Ref.
Primetime Emmy Awards	2019	Outstanding Writing for a Variety Series	The Late Show with Stephen Colbert	Nominated	
Primetime Emmy Awards	2020	Outstanding Writing for a Variety Series	The Late Show with Stephen Colbert	Nominated	
Primetime Emmy Awards	2021	Outstanding Writing for a Variety Series	The Late Show with Stephen Colbert	Nominated	
Primetime Emmy Awards	2021	Outstanding Writing for a Variety Series	Stephen Colbert's Election Night 2020: Democracy's Last Stand: Building Back America Great Again Better 2020	Nominated	
Primetime Emmy Awards	2022	Outstanding Writing for a Variety Series	The Late Show with Stephen Colbert	Nominated	
Primetime Emmy Awards	2023	Outstanding Writing for a Variety Series	The Late Show with Stephen Colbert	Nominated	
Primetime Emmy Awards	2026	Outstanding Writing for a Variety Series	The Late Show with Stephen Colbert	Won	
Writers Guild of America Awards	2021	Comedy/Variety Talk Series	The Late Show with Stephen Colbert	Nominated	
Writers Guild of America Awards	2021	Comedy/Variety Talk Series	Stephen Colbert's Election Night 2020: Democracy's Last Stand: Building Back America Great Again Better 2020	Won	
Writers Guild of America Awards	2024	Comedy/Variety Talk Series	The Late Show with Stephen Colbert	Nominated	
Writers Guild of America Awards	2025	Comedy/Variety Talk Series	The Late Show with Stephen Colbert	Nominated	
