= Review (TV series) =

2014–2017 Comedy Central series starring Andy Daly

- Genre: Mockumentary; Black comedy; Tragicomedy
- Based on: Review with Myles Barlow by Phil Lloyd; Trent O'Donnell
- Developed by: Andy Daly; Jeffrey Blitz; Charlie Siskel
- Directed by: Jeffrey Blitz
- Starring: Andy Daly
- Narrated by: Andy Daly
- Country of origin: United States
- Original language: English
- No. of seasons: 3
- No. of episodes: 22

Production
- Executive producers: Andy Daly; Jeffrey Blitz; Andy Blitz (Note: Kneebone, Heidecker and Wareheim served as executive producers in season one only. Andy Blitz joined his brother Jeffrey and took over their roles in seasons 2 and 3.); Charlie Siskel; Dave Kneebone; Tim Heidecker; Eric Wareheim
- Camera setup: Single
- Running time: 22 minutes
- Production companies: Abso Lutely Productions (Note: Abso Lutely produced the show in its first season. Production was assumed by Blitz Bros in the second and third seasons.); Andrew Daly Productions; Blitz Bros.

Original release
- Network: Comedy Central
- Release: March 6, 2014 – March 30, 2017

Review is an American mockumentary comedy television series starring Andy Daly as professional critic Forrest MacNeil, who provides reviews of real-life experiences. The series was developed by Daly, Jeffrey Blitz and Charlie Siskel, and is an adaptation of the Australian television series Review with Myles Barlow. It premiered in the United States on March 6, 2014, on Comedy Central, and ended on March 30, 2017, with a total of 22 episodes over the course of three seasons.

== Premise ==
The series uses "mockumentary" techniques to depict the fictional, reality television-style adventures of enthusiastic professional critic Forrest MacNeil, who hosts a TV show called Review in which he engages in any life experience his viewers ask him to (to judge if the experience "is any good"). Afterward, Forrest formally rates each life experience in-studio, on a five-star scale. However, Forrest's compulsive curiosity and uncompromising commitment to the show unexpectedly backfire in ways that increasingly impact his own formerly ideal real life.

== Cast ==
=== Starring ===
- Forrest MacNeil (Andy Daly) – star of the show (-within-a-show) Review; a naïve, repressed Southern California suburbanite, who wears exactly the same clothes in every episode; a good-natured and mild-mannered intellectual, Forrest sees the show as a way to help people understand their world (by indulging their natural curiosity); as a result, he carries out each life experience/viewer request no matter what the cost(s) – ignoring his instincts, compromising personal well-being and relationships, and violating social norms and laws, along the way.

=== Recurring ===
- A.J. Gibbs (Megan Stevenson) – Forrest's cheerful and expressive co-host, whose wardrobe changes each episode (and sometimes, within the same episode); she activates the review selection system, presents the chosen review to the audience, banters with Forrest, and serves as the show's (often ignored) voice of reason.
- Suzanne MacNeil (Jessica St. Clair) – Forrest's happy wife of 14 years turned hostile ex-wife. Without warning or explanation, Forrest starts divorce proceedings against Suzanne (in season one's third episode), merely because a viewer wondered what a divorce would be like. The divorce leaves Forrest and Suzanne emotionally devastated, but Suzanne soon follows through with it—to Forrest's shock and dismay. She becomes close with her younger, male divorce attorney, and Forrest jealously assumes the two are in a sexual relationship. Having lost his best/only friend, his house, half of his money, and full custody of their son, Forrest obsessively launches a series of short-sighted schemes that are designed to win Suzanne back, but are derailed by his prioritizing the show over anything (and anyone) else.
- Lucille (Tara Karsian) – Forrest's dour, disapproving-but-grudgingly-loyal executive assistant; her general apathy, and lack of respect for her boss (due to Forrest's lack of common sense and self-awareness), is on near-constant display; Forrest generally ignores her attempts to save him from himself.
- Josh (Michael Croner) – The show's unpaid college intern; fun-loving and immature, Forrest frequently exploits him.
- Grant Grunderschmidt (James Urbaniak) – Forrest's (usually) blank-faced and taciturn producer; pushes Forrest to finish assignments he otherwise would not.
- Jack T. Walthall (Fred Willard) – Forrest's accidentally ironic, sweet-yet-tactless, 75-year-old ex-father-in-law. He is killed during the "Space" review when he forgets to fasten his seatbelt while going to space with Forrest. (Seasons 1–2)
- Daisy (Julie Brister) – Forrest's inept attorney.
- Roger MacNeil (Max Gail) – Forrest's father, whom Forrest moves back in with after the events of season one. He loves and supports his son, though shows dismay when Forrest's dedication to the reviews seems to be dangerous to himself or others. (Season 2)
- Tina (Hayley Huntley) – Josh's girlfriend. Quick-witted and dryly humorous. (Seasons 2–3)
- Mrs. Greenfield (Lennon Parham) – A teacher that Forrest meets on the review of "Sleeping With Your Teacher", whom he seduces, sleeps with and later becomes her boyfriend. After being spurned by Forrest during the "Leading a Cult" review, she usurps the cult, and leaves him. She is killed by the FBI during the "Having the Perfect Body" review. (Season 2)

Season one guest stars include Andy Richter, Ashley Tisdale, Jason Mantzoukas, Rich Fulcher, Lance Bass, Emo Philips, Andy Blitz, and Maria Thayer.

Season two guest stars include Allison Tolman, Mary Birdsong, Johnny Pemberton, Ian Roberts, and Matt Besser.

Season three guest stars include original Australian series creator Phil Lloyd.

== Production ==
The network initially ordered eight episodes for the first season run, but so much extra content was left over that a ninth episode was made. Every episode of the series was directed by Jeffrey Blitz.

== Episodes ==
Season	Episodes	Originally released	
Season	Episodes	First released	Last released
1	9	March 6, 2014	May 1, 2014
2	10	July 30, 2015	October 1, 2015
3	3	March 16, 2017	March 30, 2017

=== Season 1 (2014) ===
No. overall	No. in season	Title	Directed by	Written by	Original release date	U.S. viewers (millions)
1	1	"Stealing; Addiction; Prom"	Jeffrey Blitz	Leo Allen, Andy Blitz, Jeffrey Blitz, Andy Daly, Kevin Dorff, Carol Kolb, Charlie Siskel, and Gavin Steckler	March 6, 2014	0.541
Forrest MacNeil welcomes the viewers to the show and receives his first review. He starts with "Stealing", and after lifting some malted milk balls from his local grocer, he rapidly escalates to an attempted bank heist that goes wrong, resulting in intern Josh getting shot in the butt. He rates it 2 stars. In his second review, "Addiction", he finds that his threshold for addiction is high, except when it comes to cocaine. Initially reluctant to take drugs, he rates the review one million stars while high, later lowering it .5 stars after rehab. During his third and final review, "Going to Prom", he takes his son's babysitter to prom. Before the review is completed, he and other students at the prom get high on cocaine, and he rates the review .5 stars after being taken to the hospital.: Stealing; Drug Addiction (initially a million stars); Going to Prom
2	2	"Sex Tape; Racist; Hunting"	Jeffrey Blitz	Leo Allen, Andy Blitz, Jeffrey Blitz, Andy Daly, Kevin Dorff, Carol Kolb, and Gavin Steckler	March 13, 2014	0.651
During the first review, "Making a Sex Tape", Forrest asks for the assistance of his faithful wife Suzanne, who refuses. He then settled for a sex doll and films the video, but accidentally falls asleep and wakes up to Suzanne walking in on him. The experience brings the couple closer and he rates it 4 stars. During his second review, "Being a Racist", he learns racist slurs and tries to offend his Black neighbor, Gene, who thinks he is joking around until Forrest uses the worst slur of them all, shocking a small party at Forrest's house. Forrest rates the experience .5 stars. In "Hunting", Forrest gets the help of his wife’s father Jack, and they accidentally end up in a tiger reserve, where Forrest narrowly survives being attacked. He rates give hunting 3.5 stars.: Making a Sex Tape; Being a Racist; Hunting
3	3	"Pancakes; Divorce; Pancakes"	Jeffrey Blitz	Leo Allen, Andy Blitz, Jeffrey Blitz, Andy Daly, Kevin Dorff, Carol Kolb, and Gavin Steckler	March 20, 2014	0.500
A viewer with a box of pancake mix containing a recipe for 15 pancakes asks Forrest to review eating that many. Forrest eats them and is disgusted; he scores it .5 stars. The second request is to get divorced, which ruins his life, particularly once his wife Suzanne announces that she is happier without him. Forrest is so bereft, he gives no review. Another viewer asks about eating 30 pancakes. Forrest's internal numbness leads him to down all of the food. He scores it 5 stars.: Eating 15 Pancakes; Getting Divorced (No Rating); Eating 30 Pancakes
4	4	"Celebrity; Batman"	Jeffrey Blitz	Leo Allen, Andy Blitz, Jeffrey Blitz, Andy Daly, Kevin Dorff, Carol Kolb, and Gavin Steckler	March 27, 2014	0.551
A viewer who routinely masturbates to celebrities wonders what it would be like to actually have sex with one. Forrest sets out to find one by attending an anti-bullying charity event hosted by Ashley Tisdale, where he bids $70,000 to have dinner with her. She ditches him, so instead he has sex with a barfly, whom he has mistaken for one of the Real Housewives of Beverly Hills. He goes to a book reading by a former local broadcaster who has a book about her recently deceased husband. When they have sex, it ends with her sobbing and begging for her husband's ashes. Sleeping with a celebrity is one star. A child asks what being Batman is like. Forrest dresses the part, but does not engage in any crime fighting, only returning shopping carts used by the homeless and agitating a man urinating in public. He is called to his divorce proceedings while in costume and it negatively impacts his negotiations. This reinvigorates him to feel like Batman and he violently assaults a convenience store attendant, rattles a snack free from a vending machine, and kicks Josh out of his office, where he has been sleeping. Being Batman is 4 out of 5 stars.: Sleeping with a Celebrity; Being Batman
5	5	"Best Friend; Space"	Jeffrey Blitz	Leo Allen, Andy Blitz, Jeffrey Blitz, Andy Daly, Kevin Dorff, Carol Kolb, and Gavin Steckler	April 3, 2014	0.423
A viewer asks for a review on having a best friend; as Forrest's only friend is his ex-wife Suzanne, he tries to strike up a relationship with his old neighbor Gene. This angers Gene's actual best friend, who escalates the conflict to dating Suzanne. Having a best friend is 2.5 stars. A tweet asks what it is like to go to outer space; Forrest makes the trip and invites his former father-in-law Jack, who has always dreamed of being an astronaut. A miscommunication leads Jack to not being strapped in and he violently dies slamming against the ship. Forrest gives the experience 5 out of 5 stars for the majesty of spaceflight, in spite of the tragedy of Suzanne's father dying.: Having a Best Friend; Going into Space
6	6	"Road Rage; Orgy"	Jeffrey Blitz	Leo Allen, Andy Blitz, Jeffrey Blitz, Andy Daly, Kevin Dorff, Carol Kolb, and Gavin Steckler	April 10, 2014	0.368
An email comes in from a motorist who is always angry but has never taken it out on another driver. Forrest agrees to get road rage, but when he tries to have a confrontation, he gets carjacked. He drives intern Josh to a medical marijuana dispensary and sees Suzanne on a date with her divorce attorney, which sends Forrest into a fury. His next confrontation ends with the other driver falling off a cliff and evidently dying. Road rage is 1.5 stars. A viewer asks what being in an orgy is like. Forrest gains access to an orgy through an associate from rehab; he is initially awkward, but is encouraged by the host and vigorously has sex with several women and becomes obsessed. Forrest's friend Tom falls off the wagon back into sex addiction and they meet at a subsequent orgy. Arcane rules of the orgy force them into a contest where Forrest ends up becoming the king and Tom is ejected. Forrest suggests ending the anonymity of the group sex and is also ejected. Orgies are 2 stars, in part for getting gonorrhea.: Road Rage; Being at a Sex Party/a Swinger
7	7	"Revenge; Getting Rich; Aching"	Jeffrey Blitz	Leo Allen, Andy Blitz, Jeffrey Blitz, Andy Daly, Kevin Dorff, Carol Kolb, and Gavin Steckler	April 17, 2014	0.426
A student athlete asks what getting revenge is like, as he is considering mob violence to attack an opposing team. Recalling a dispute from middle school with a boy named Randy, Forrest discovers that his former nemesis is now a literature professor. Forrest interrupts Randy's class lecture with a prank that drives him mad. As Forrest gives a five-star review, Randy flings poop onto hostess A. J. Gibbs and leaves a turd on Forrest's desk. Forrest tries to sincerely make amends, but A. J. hijacks his present with an exploding turd. Forrest changes his review to one star and A. J. gives it five. A viewer who was born rich wants to know what it is like to get rich quickly. Forrest attends a seminar from a financial guru, where he steals another attendee's business idea and severely burns himself while walking on hot coals. He gets a $70,000 settlement and puts it all into the other person's business idea. Getting rich quick is 4 stars. A mangled tweet asks Forrest to review "there all is aching". He struggles to understand what this means and ends up talking like a maniac, getting him electroconvulsive shock therapy. He gives his involuntary confinement at a mental hospital 3 stars. A follow-up tweet clarifies that the initial request was intended to be for "bubblebaths" and this got swapped with her user name "the real Lisa Ching" ("thereallisaching"). Forrest declares this a shame, as he really likes bubble baths.: Getting Revenge (initially 5 stars); Getting Rich Quick; 'There All Is Aching'
8	8	"Marry; Run; Party"	Jeffrey Blitz	Leo Allen, Andy Blitz, Jeffrey Blitz, Andy Daly, Kevin Dorff, Carol Kolb, and Gavin Steckler	April 24, 2014	0.459
A woman who has been with her boyfriend for seven years wonders if she could be just as happy marrying a stranger. Forrest is set up on a date with a woman named Eliza, and when they meet at a Mexican restaurant, the two have an instant connection. They get married and he joins her communal living situation. Overjoyed, he invites her onto his set and the two give marrying a stranger 5 stars. A dentist wants to know what it is like to run from the law. Forrest plans on throwing a brick at a parked cop car, but instead Eliza takes a police officer hostage. The trio (along with a cameraman) drive to a remote motel where she and the hostage fall in love and get married. Forrest gives this 1.5 stars. A wallflower wants to know what being the life of the party is like, so Forrest hosts a party at the commune, but gets locked in the bathroom. Meanwhile, Eliza becomes enamored of a man who lives in a submarine and leaves Forrest and the police officer. Forrest later attends his son Eric's birthday party, where he is a hit with the kids. Being the life of the party is 3.5 stars.: Marrying a Stranger; Running from the Law; Being 'The Life of the Party'
9	9	"Quitting; Last Day; Irish"	Jeffrey Blitz	Leo Allen, Andy Blitz, Jeffrey Blitz, Andy Daly, Kevin Dorff, Carol Kolb, and Gavin Steckler	May 1, 2014	0.438
A viewer asks for a review of quitting a job, so Forrest briefly gets a job at a customer service center and tells off his boss. Deciding this was insufficient, he takes a job in the lobby of a building at a coffee shop run by a kindly old man. Forrest revises the coffee cart into a gourmet coffee station and it is a hit. After his producer reminds him to quit, Forrest he tells off the owner, which leads the shop's other employee to quit as well. Forrest considers it a 2 star experience. A viewer asks about living her last day. Forrest sets out to live his last day, getting a partial tattoo and overeating Mexican food. His assistant Lucille is inspired to have sex with a stranger, and Forrest takes his intern Josh to shoot guns, drink champagne, and have a cocaine-fueled orgy broken up by the police. Forrest has a heartfelt goodbye with Suzanne, convincing her that he is dying; seeing this as an explanation for his erratic and self-destructive behavior, Suzanne takes him back. Forrest rates it 5 stars. A Turkish viewer asks about being Irish, so Forrest becomes an ethnic stereotype, which Suzanne initially excuses as symptoms of a brain tumor. However, she learns from his doctor that Forrest is not dying and confronts him at an Irish pub. She insists that his family come before the show. He refuses, and she leaves in tears. Forrest quits his job and punches Grant, leaving the bar to chase after Suzanne. A. J. gives the experience 5 stars in his stead.: Quitting a Job; Living Your Last Day; Being Irish (rating issued by A. J.)

=== Season 2 (2015) ===
No. overall	No. in season	Title	Directed by	Written by	Original release date	U.S. viewers (millions)
10	1	"Brawl; Blackmail; Glory Hole"	Jeffrey Blitz	Gavin Steckler	July 30, 2015	0.257
After ruining his life with indiscriminate reviews in season one, Forrest returns with a new veto booth that allows him to refuse particularly dangerous experiences. A viewer wants to know what getting into a fight is like. When someone cuts in front of Forrest in line at an ATM, he hits the other man, who immediately pulls out a gun and shoots Forrest multiple times. After emergency surgery, a coma, and a lengthy recovery period, Forrest bonds with his nurse Marisa and they start dating. This causes him to give it a 2.5. The next request is to blackmail someone and he chooses Marisa, who has been stealing excess pills from her dead patients. This destroys their relationship and her career; she attempts to kill him. Forrest rates this 1.5 stars. A teen challenges Forrest to use gloryholes. After some trouble finding one, Forrest eventually uses one in a park restroom, mistakenly believing that the person administering oral sex on him is a woman. He rates it 4.5 stars.: Bare-Knuckled Brawl; Blackmail; Glory Holes
11	2	"Curing Homosexuality; Mile High Club"	Jeffrey Blitz	Andy Blitz	August 6, 2015	0.347
A couple with a gay son wants to know how to cure homosexuality; A. J. encourages Forrest to use one of his two vetoes, but he declines. His initial research at a sex shop leads him to conclude that it is an impossible mission, but Grant convinces him it would be homophobic not to think that he could cure homosexuality. After being rejected by countless gay men, Forrest comes across Tim, who is depressed and alienated by being gay. A quack therapist's gay conversion therapy techniques fail, as does Forrest's attempt to cure Tim with a visit to a strip club. Forrest, however, gets a date with dancer Shampoo. Meanwhile, another dancer takes Tim to a gay bar, where he hits it off with a man and decides to accept being gay. Forrest mistakenly believes Tim and the stripper have become a couple, and rates curing homosexuality 2 stars. The next request is to join the mile high club, so Forrest and Shampoo get a flight to ostensibly meet Forrest's son, but when she discovers his true motives, she is offended and refuses. Forrest switches seats with someone and meets Beth, who is willing to have sex with him in the bathroom; however, this is no longer an option as the plane begins its descent, and Forrest declines her offer to have sex on the floor. Forrest and Shampoo pick up Eric from Suzanne's house, and Forrest picks up a prostitute who ends up having sex with numerous men who outbid Forrest during the flight. As this plane descends, she quickly gives him a handjob under a blanket while his son and Shampoo sit several rows back; he rates the experience 3 stars.: Curing Homosexuality; Mile High Club
12	3	"Falsely Accused; Sleep With Your Teacher; Little Person"	Jeffrey Blitz	Leo Allen	August 13, 2015	0.282
A young man is concerned that he will be accused of eating a cake that his sister ate, and Forrest investigates what it is like to be falsely accused. He asks Josh and Tina to insist that he was a man who stole an avocado seen in a local crime report, but they feel this crime is too small and frame him for burning down a sorority house instead. Facing eight years of imprisonment, Forrest is saved at the last minute by the confession from the actual arsonist, Tina's roommate. Forrest considers this a 1 star experience. A high schooler with a crush on his algebra teacher asks for a review of having sex with one's teacher. Forrest flies out to ingratiate himself to the boy's teacher, Mrs. Greenfield, and seduces her, convincing her to leave her husband. The two begin dating and run into her student in public, leading to a brief fight. Forrest still rates the experience 5 stars. A giant wonders what it would be like to be a little person, which Forrest initially simulates by surrounding himself with oversized items in his office and home. While watching Dorf on Golf, he decides to start walking on his knees. He accidentally starts a fire while cooking and, committed to staying short, is unable to reach a fire extinguisher, leading to his father's house burning down. He rates the experience 3.5 stars for giving him a sense of the struggles of the small.: Falsely Accused; Sleeping with Your Teacher; Being a Little Person
13	4	"Cult; Perfect Body"	Jeffrey Blitz	Kevin Dorff	August 20, 2015	0.278
A viewer asks what it is like to be a cult leader. While having sex with Mrs. Greenfield outdoors, he views Cassiopeia and becomes convinced that its five stars spell out an "M", signifying "MacNeil". He attracts a handful of followers to his father's timeshare cottage, where they set up a communal living space in an adjacent yard. Mrs. Greenfield gets jealous when Forrest starts having sex with the female members and she turns the cult into a violent criminal gang, drawing the attention of the authorities. Forrest gives the experience 2 out of 5 stars. His next challenge is to have the perfect body, and he sets out to get a variety of surgeries to augment his form, alongside steroids that drive him to rage. He confronts his old cult at the same time that the police arrive and a firefight ensues, killing all cult members, injuring Forrest's father, and incinerating the cottage. Forrest gives it .5 stars.: Leading a Cult; Having the Perfect Body
14	5	"Catfish; Haunted House"	Jeffrey Blitz	Jeffrey Blitz	August 27, 2015	0.362
A viewer with no luck at online dating wants to know what catfishing is like. Forrest learns about how to do it in his office, where he, his father, Josh, and Tina now live. This team works with Lucille to make an ideal dating profile that bears no resemblance to the real Forrest. He matches with many women, including his ex-wife Suzanne. He sets up a video conference with her, and hires Joe, the man whose photo he used for his profile, to stand in for him. He tells her that she seems like a great woman, but they should not contact one another anymore, because he lied to her about his identity. Forrest gives this 3 stars. A letter comes in to Review from someone who has died while the letter was in the mail and wanted him to review staying in a haunted house. Forrest and his father go to a house purportedly haunted by a series of ghosts and spend the night in the basement. Forrest later realizes that the house where he used to live with Suzanne is "haunted" to him. The new owners are on vacation, so he breaks in, gets drunk and falls asleep in his former bedroom. He is stabbed by a resident who did not join her family on the vacation. He gives the experience 1 star.: Catfishing; Haunted House
15	6	"William Tell; Grant A Wish; Rowboat"	Jeffrey Blitz	Jessie Cantrell	September 3, 2015	0.350
A viewer asks Forrest to "do a William Tell". He practices shooting an apple off of a doll's head, but never gets close enough to risk his son's life. Instead, he decides to perform the role of the son and has his own father shoot off the apple. This ends with Forrest shot by an arrow in the chest twice and Lucille once. He rates it a 2. Next, he is asked to grant a wish. Seeking to brighten his son Eric's life, he goes to visit him at his mother's San Francisco home, where he finds her dating Joe. Forrest's son wishes for Joe and Suzanne to move in together, so Forrest encourages both of them to get more serious, and Suzanne and Eric move in with Joe. Suzanne also invites Forrest's father to live in one of the guesthouses. Forrest considers this .5 stars. A final request comes from a viewer who has several children and just wants to know the peacefulness of being alone on a rowboat. Forrest mounts a camera onto a boat and starts rowing into the Pacific. His pain pills from the arrow injuries cause him to pass out for six hours, during which time he loses the oars, and he awakens adrift in the ocean, with no food, water, or means of communication. His recording loses battery power, starting up again over three months later. Forrest is now in the Great Pacific Garbage Patch and is eating scraps of trash and various birds he has killed. He is saved by Japanese whalers, and rates the experience .5 stars.: William Tell; Granting a Wish; Rowboat
16	7	"Buried Alive; 6 Star Review; Public Speaking"	Jeffrey Blitz	Story by : Jessie Cantrell; Teleplay by : Gavin Steckler	September 10, 2015	0.203
A viewer asks Forrest what it iss like to be buried alive. Josh and Tina dig him a grave and are tasked with getting him out of the earth later. While in his casket, Suzanne calls to tell him that she and Joe are getting married. After 24 hours buried alive, Josh cannot remember where Forrest is buried. A desperate Forrest punches through the soil and is assaulted by a grave-digger who mistakes him for a zombie. Forrest gives it .5 stars. When another viewer asks Forrest to give something a rating of a 6 stars, he briefly has a crisis and considers vetoing this, but he decides to make a new show named Assess, where he assesses life experiences on a scale of 2 to 6 stars. On this new program, a woman asks what it is like to have the best ice cream in town. Forrest thoroughly enjoys it, but smudges some ice cream on his shirt, so he can only give it 5.5 stars. Since this fails the task of actually giving something 6 stars, he creates another program named Evaluate, where all life experiences are given 6 stars. A woman asks what it is like to be kicked in the testicle, and A. J. immediately kicks Forrest twice (once for each testicle). The agonizing pain is 6 stars by default, though the process of giving something 6 stars is only 1 star. A viewer asks about speaking in public. Forrest decides to give a speech at Suzanne's wedding. He settles on a piece of character assassination against her philandering fiance Joe, but watches a video from his own wedding to Suzanne and loses heart at anything that would make her unhappy. Suzanne intercepts Forrest when he arrives at the rehearsal dinner and tells him to leave, or to at least not cause any problems. Drunk, Forrest puts away his planned comments and instead rambles, beginning with kind sentiments and ending up proposing to her. He and Joe fight, and Forrest comes clean about the catfishing that introduced her to Joe, ruining their relationship. Forrest calls this a 4.5 out of 5.: Buried Alive; Giving Six Stars; Having the Best Ice Cream in Town; Getting Kicked in the Balls; Public Speaking
17	8	"Murder; Magic 8 Ball; Procrastination"	Jeffrey Blitz	Rich Talarico	September 17, 2015	0.233
A viewer named Gina wants to know what it is like to kill a person. Forrest finally vetoes this experience. This is followed by a request from a viewer to make all decisions using a Magic 8 Ball. Forrest defers to the toy for every question or decision that he encounters by shaking a Magic 8 Ball hidden in a fanny pack. A call from Suzanne results in Forrest infuriating her and telling him to not contact her again. The 8 Ball leads him to watch a man savagely beat another man in an alley, and a string of non-answers leads him to stand there watching for hours. Forrest rates the experience 1 star. A viewer asks what procrastination is like. When Forrest tries this task, he realizes it is impossible: as soon as he starts procrastinating, he is doing the task, which by definition is not procrastinating. Due to the logical paradox, he issues his second and final veto of the season, to A. J.'s delight. This is followed by Gina making a second request that he kill a person. Grant and the show's legal counsel explicitly tell Forrest not to kill anyone, but Grant also implies that he should, as it would be ground-breaking television. After failing to get helpful advice from his father, Forrest goes to the bedside of the man whom he saw beaten, who is now in a coma with very remote chances of coming out, but Forrest cannot bring himself to murder him. He feels that the man who committed the assault is more deserving of death; he finds the man, Ray, who is thankful at not having been turned in and has taken it as a second chance at life. He gives Forrest an embrace, but confuses Forrests microphone for a police wire and starts beating him. Forrest shoots and kills Ray in self defense. He becomees haunted by nightmares and gives killing a person .5 stars.: Killing a Person (Vetoed); Magic 8 Ball; Procrastination (Vetoed); Killing a Person
18	9	"Happiness; Pillow Fight; Imaginary Friend"	Jeffrey Blitz	Andy Blitz	September 24, 2015	0.229
A viewer with a new prescription for antidepressants wonders what it is like to be happy all the time. Despite being haunted by the memory of killing a man, Forrest responds to everything positively. He gleefully agrees to Suzanne's request to waive all visitation rights with his son and have no contact with them for two months. While they are talking, he gets arrested for homicide, which causes him to laugh with joy. Grant visits Forrest in the county jail and informs him that they plan to keep the show going and that they have gotten permission to film him while incarcerated. While A. J. visits him, he calls the absurd state of being perpetually happy 3 stars and issues his next challenge: to review what it is like to have a pillow fight. Forrest proposes to the prison psychologist that pillow fights may defuse the violent tendencies of the prisoners. When the jail-wide event is scheduled, it turns to carnage, as many convicts insert weights into their pillowcases and savagely beat the police. Forrest rates pillow fights 1 star. A tweet from a mother whose child has an imaginary friend wonders what that is like, so Forrest wanders around talking to his new fantasy Clovers. The other inmates do not play along, resulting in conflict, until bullying inmate Cassius insists that he and Clovers are actually friends and sexual partners. Forrest's father comes to visit and explains that he has paid bail, but also has to cut ties with his son. Cassius and a group of inmates stab Clovers to death, leaving Forrest completely alone. He rates the friendship 3 stars.: Happiness; Pillow Fight; Imaginary Friend
19	10	"Conspiracy Theory"	Jeffrey Blitz	Andy Daly	October 1, 2015	0.239
A viewer asks about believing in conspiracy theories. After attending a lecture by a conspiracist, he decides that it would be comforting to believe that his misfortunes resulting from hosting Review were actually part of a plot against him. He becomes convinced that Grant has arranged these dangerous scenarios and coordinated the other staff members to make mundane reviews perilous. He confronts Grant with his evidence, but Grant explains that the show gets dangerous requests because viewers already understand what mundane are like, and argues that he has no incentive to kill Forrest as he is necessary for the show. Forrest is convinced and recommits to Review as a public service, giving a belief in conspiracy theories .5 stars. A viewer asks what it is like to be hunted. Forrest goes on the run, being hunted by a Navy SEAL; he quits the show and tries to reach Suzanne and Eric to protect them. Grant intercepts him on a bridge and the SEAL shows up to "hunt" Forrest with a paintball gun. Forrest dives over the bridge and takes Grant with him, apparently killing them both. A. J. announces that Forrest and Grant are missing and rates being hunted 6 stars.: Believing a Conspiracy; Being Hunted (rating issued by A. J.)

=== Season 3 (2017) ===
No. overall	No. in season	Title	Directed by	Written by	Original release date	U.S. viewers (millions)
20	1	"Locorito; Pet Euthanasia; Dream"	Jeffrey Blitz	Andy Blitz	March 16, 2017	0.267
Forrest and Grant are alive despite the fall into a river, though Grant is now in a wheelchair. Season three now has unlimited vetoes, but Forrest commits to never vetoing any request. The first request is a marketing stunt for him to eat the Locorito from fast food chain Neato Taquito; however, the request came several months earlier, while Forrest was lost in the woods, and the company has since gone out of business. Josh and Tina find a hoarder on Craigslist who has a moldy burrito refrigerated in his filthy home. Forrest gets violently ill, and during his murder trial he collapses with food poisoning. He rates the Locorito 1 star. When he is tasked with putting down a pet, he tries to get his old family dog from Suzanne, who refuses. He goes to an animal hospital to participate in euthanasia that has been ordered for a bearded dragon. He brings the lizard to his office and care for it to form a bond, and discovers that the lizard was not dying, but just needed some affection. Forrest buys a second bearded dragon to euthanize, but the second eats the first one; anguished, Forrest kills the new one, and rates the experience 3 stars. A tweet asks what it is like to make one's dream come true. Forrest interprets this as recreating a literal dream during his waking life. Suzanne features in all his dreams and she refuses to participate, but Forrest finally has a dream where Suzanne just tells him to go away. Making a dream come true is 4 stars.: Eating a Locorito; Putting a Pet to Sleep; Making Your Dream Come True
21	2	"Co-Host; Ass-Slap; Helen Keller; Forgiveness"	Jeffrey Blitz	Jeffrey Blitz	March 23, 2017	0.255
A viewer wants to know what it is like to be a co-host, so Forrest immediately swaps places with A. J. and issues a review to her to slap a stranger on the buttocks. She heads out to investigate, leaving Forrest confused and upset. Forrest meanders about backstage and learns about her life: he was completely ignorant about her job responsibilities and personal relationships. A. J. returns, having realized that slapping a stranger is disrespectful and refuses to do it and also skips reviewing it. Forrest is outraged and they swap back roles, where he gives being a co-host .5 stars. A mother wants to teach her son about real adversity, so she asks Forrest to emulate deaf-blind activist Helen Keller. Forrest mistakenly believes she was also mute, so he wanders around with his eyes and ears covered, not speaking to anyone. Josh and Tina also drape him in a 19th-century woman's dress and a wig. At his murder trial, he flails around and manipulates any objects in his grasp, which is ineffectual as he is called up to the stand to testify. In spite of this, he is acquitted and rates the Helen Keller experience 5 stars. The final request comes from a tweet asking what forgiveness is. He visits Suzanne who is cautiously willing to engage with him. Forrest forgives her, which causes her shock and outrage, leading her to outline all of the miserable experiences that he has imposed on his former family and slam the door in his face. He begs forgiveness from Grant for paralyzing him and Grant explains that he already did. Forrest gives forgiveness 4 stars.: Being a Co-Host; Slapping a Stranger's Ass (review unaccomplished; rating issued by A. J.); Being Helen Keller; Forgiveness
22	3	"Cryogenics; Lightning; Last Review"	Jeffrey Blitz	Andy Daly	March 30, 2017	0.228
A viewer wants a review of cryogenics. Forrest mistakes a cryotherapy facility for a cryogenics laboratory; he passes out, and upon awakening is convinced that he is in the distant future. He bumps into Josh, who tells him that it has only been 45 minutes. Forrest admits to Suzanne that the idea of being frozen and missing out on the rest of Eric and Suzanne's life would have been a waste. He gives cryogenics 2 stars. A viewer asks about being struck by lightning. Forrest travels to a thunderstorm in Arizona where he is struck by a lightning bolt; he calls the experience "terrible" but still finds it inspiring enough to be rated 2.5 stars. Suzanne sends a video requesting a review on not reviewing anything for the rest of his life, saying that he will never see her or Eric again if he refuses. Forrest is moved by the gesture, but ultimately vetoes it after speaking to Grant. A. J. refuses to participate and Forrest reveals that his final review is to be pranked. This is not only the final review of this episode, but for all of Review, as the series is canceled. Forrest refuses to believe it and thinks the cruelty of being canceled immediately after he abandoned his family must be the prank. When he checks in at Suzanne's house, she and Eric have moved. The office is emptied and A. J. moves on to her own show, taking Josh and Tina. On an almost empty set, Forrest gives being pranked 5 stars.: Cryogenics; Being Struck by Lightning; Not Reviewing Anything Ever Again (Vetoed); Being Pranked

== Reception ==
For the first season, the review aggregator website Rotten Tomatoes reports an 87% approval rating with an average rating of 8.7/10, based on 15 critic reviews. The website's critics consensus reads, "The subversive Review lures viewers with a seemingly innocuous hook and gradually reveals a disturbing commitment to its high concept, making for one of the darkest – and uproarious – of comedies." Metacritic, which uses a weighted average, assigned a score of 71 out of 100 based on 10 critics, indicating "generally favorable reviews".

For the second season, Rotten Tomatoes reports a 100% approval rating with an average rating of 8.2/10, based on 17 critic reviews. The website's critics consensus reads, "Review's sophomore season marks a series at its most confident and sardonic, with star Andy Daly committing a masterclass of self-destruction as the increasingly unhinged Forrest MacNeil." Metacritic assigned a score of 83 out of 100 based on 4 critics, indicating "universal acclaim".

For the third season, Rotten Tomatoes reports a 100% approval rating with an average rating of 9.3/10, based on 19 critic reviews. The website's critics consensus reads, "Review's final season continues the brutal, mercilessly bleak, and awkwardly hilarious misadventures of its host, with enough creative momentum to suggest staying power – if it only had a chance to continue." Metacritic assigned a score of 88 out of 100 based on 6 critics, indicating "universal acclaim".
