= Joan Binder Weiss =

American screenwriter

Joan Binder Weiss is an American television screenwriter and producer.

Most notably, Weiss has written several episodes for both Gilmore Girls and Everwood, although other writing credits include episodes for Inconceivable, Journeyman, Sabrina, the Teenage Witch, Grace Under Fire, Summerland and the 1992 Fractured Film Awards.

She has also produced episodes of Everwood and Summerland, and served as both story editor and executive story editor on Gilmore Girls.

She is supervising producer for Unforgettable.

She is married to fellow television writer David S. Weiss.
