= David S. Weiss =

American comedy writer

David S. Weiss is an American comedy writer. He has written for Dennis Miller Live, CNBC's "Dennis Miller", The Late Late Show with Craig Kilborn, and Penn & Teller: Bullshit!. In 2005, he ran unsuccessfully for the Writers Guild of America board of directors.

From March 2007, he was Dennis Miller's talk radio sidekick on The Dennis Miller Show, where he was referred to as "Salman," or "Sal". Miller assigned Weiss the moniker early in their time working together, due to his purported resemblance to Sir Salman Rushdie. He was also referred to as "Count Dracu-sal" and an eerie organ music cue (Johann Sebastian Bach's Toccata and Fugue in D Minor) was played whenever he made funny and/or cryptic remarks that reflected his penchant for black comedy. Miller also frequently referred to "Sal" as his "go-to Jew", when he needed some inside information on Jewish culture and customs. Weiss is a banjo player. On February 17, 2009, after not missing a radio show for the first two years, Dennis Miller nicknamed the dark-humored comic the "Cal Ripken of Hate". During the February 22nd, 2010 show, it was announced on air Weiss would be leaving the show February 26 to pursue other opportunities.

He is married to television writer and story editor Joan Binder Weiss.
