= Laurie Kilmartin =

American comedian and writer (born 1965)

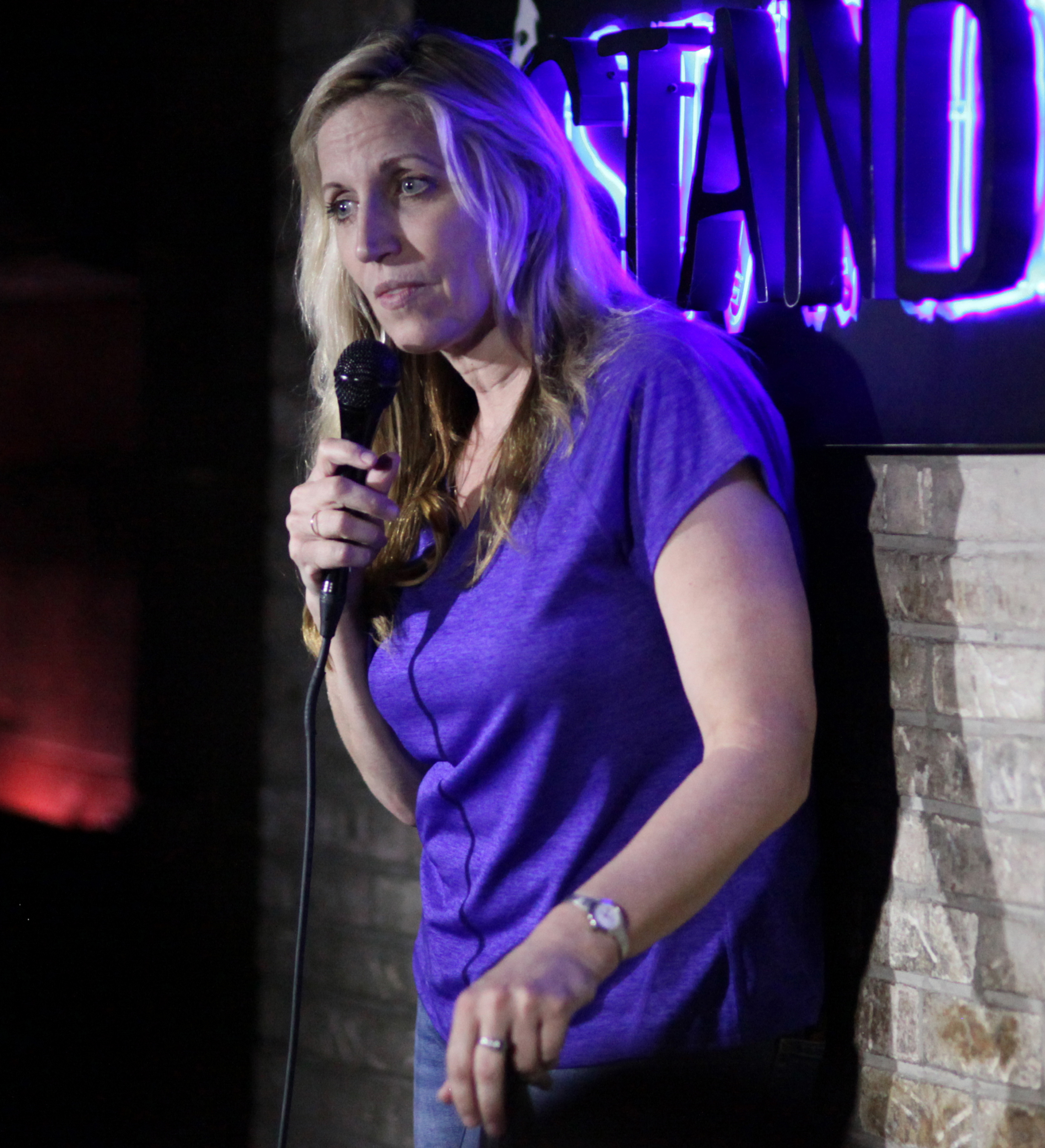
- Kilmartin in 2016
- Born: July 16, 1965 (age 61); San Jose, California, U.S.
- Education: University of California, Los Angeles
- Children: 1

Comedy career
- Years active: 1987–present
- Medium: Stand-up, writing
- Subjects: Death, family, parenthood, human sexuality, politics
- Website: www.kilmartin.com

Laurie Kilmartin (born July 16, 1965) is an American comedian and writer best known for being a finalist on Last Comic Standing season 7 (2010). She was also a staff writer for Conan O'Brien's show Conan.

== Early life ==
Kilmartin was born in 1965 in Santa Clara County, California, and grew up in Walnut Creek, California. Her father was a civil engineer, and worked abroad for much of her childhood, building dams and bridges in Iran, Nicaragua, Saudi Arabia, and the Philippines.

She attended the University of California, Los Angeles, where she was a competitive swimmer.

== Career ==
=== Stand-up ===
Kilmartin began performing standup on August 27, 1987 at Fubar's Comedy Club in Martinez, California, and continued doing contract comedy gigs in the Pacific Northwest. She has since performed stand-up on Conan, Jimmy Kimmel Live!, Comedy Central's Premium Blend, Showtime, the USO Tour Cuba, for troops in Iraq, Shorties Watchin' Shorties, Verdict with Dan Abrams, Red Eye w/ Greg Gutfeld, and The World Stands Up. She has been featured at comedy festivals in Aspen, Edinburgh, and Montreal.

She also appeared on VH1's Best Week Ever, the Today Show, White Boyz in Da Hood, Countdown with Keith Olbermann, The Rachel Maddow Show, Fox & Friends and The Oprah Winfrey Show.

In 2009 Kilmartin released a CD, Five Minutes to Myself, consisting of material she was not allowed to use on air. The CD covers topics such as immigrant boyfriends and unwanted Mexican babies, then answers an age-old question: Why is God such a prick in the Old Testament? Punchline Magazine called Five Minutes to Myself one of the “Top Ten Comedy CDs of 2009.”

Her comedy special, 45 Jokes About My Dead Dad, stand up comedy about cancer, hospice, death, grieving and funerals, debuted on Seeso, December 29, 2016.

Kilmartin was also a ‘Top Ten’ finalist in season 7 of NBC’s Last Comic Standing. She was also listed in The Huffington Post's 53 Favorite Female Comedians list in 2011.

In early 2016, Kilmartin and fellow comic Jackie Kashian began a new podcast produced by Nerdist Industries called The Jackie and Laurie Show. The two primarily discuss stand-up comedy in LA and on the road, occasionally covering harassment and the unequal treatment of female comics, Kilmartin's job as a staff writer on the late-night circuit, and Kilmartin's multi-generational family living situation.

=== Media appearances ===
During an MSNBC panel discussion following the May 2022 leak of a Supreme Court draft, which would overturn Roe v. Wade, Kilmartin joked that she would "make sweet love" to the person who leaked the brief, and that if the leaker turned out to be a Republican, she would "joyfully abort our fetus and let them know."

=== Writing ===
As a writer, Kilmartin was on the staff of The Late Late Show, Tough Crowd with Colin Quinn (on which she was also a frequent panelist), and Comedy Central's Too Late with Adam Carolla and The Bonnie Hunt Show. She also wrote articles published on Huffington Post, Babble.com, and co-authored Sherri Shepherd's memoir, Permission Slips.

In 2012, she wrote the New York Times bestselling book Sh*tty Mom: The Parenting Guide for the Rest of Us.

In 2018, she published Dead People S*ck, "an honest, irreverent, laugh-out-loud guide to coping with death and dying."

== Personal life ==
Kilmartin has a son born in 2006. She is a single mother who often jokes about her son and motherhood.

Her mother died from complications of COVID-19 on June 18, 2020.

== Discography ==
- Five Minutes to Myself (2009)
- 45 Jokes About My Dead Dad (2017)
- Corset (2021)
