= Tim Harrod =

American comedy writer and actor (born 1968)

- Born: Tim Harrod; May 25, 1968 (age 58); Lynnfield, Massachusetts
- Citizenship: America
- Occupation: Writer
- Relatives: Donald Harrod
- Writing career
- Genre: comedy
- Notable works: The Onion and Late Night with Conan O'Brien

Tim Harrod (born May 25, 1968) is an American comedy writer and actor, known for Late Night with Conan O'Brien, The Onion, 58th Primetime Emmy Awards, and Golden Age (2006).

== The Early years ==
Harrod acted with the improvisational franchise ComedySportz, in Ann Arbor, Michigan 1987–1989. He acted with the West Bloomfield, Michigan Comedy Sports in 1991–92. He also worked extensively in stand-up comedy, in a two-person act with Tim Pryor (a member of the first cast of Second City, Detroit, and a ComedySportz veteran).

== Filmography ==
=== Writer ===
- The Onion's Extremely Accurate History of the Internet (2012)
- Late Night with Conan O'Brien (2005–2007)
- Golden Age (2007)
- The 58th Annual Primetime Emmy Awards (2006)

=== Actor ===
- Star Wars: Tremors of the Force (2014)
- Golden Age (2007)
- Late Night with Conan O'Brien (2005–2007)
- The Astounding World of the Future (2001)>

=== Appearance ===
- The Aristocrats With Onion staffers; Harrod makes the joke about Jesus performing in blackface (2005)
