= Dennis Miller Live =

American television series (1994-2002)

- Created by: Michael Fuchs; Dennis Miller
- Presented by: Dennis Miller
- Theme music composer: Roland Orzabal; Ian Stanley; Chris Hughes
- Opening theme: "Everybody Wants to Rule the World" by Tears for Fears
- Ending theme: "Everybody Wants to Rule the World" by Tears for Fears
- Country of origin: United States
- Original language: English
- No. of episodes: 215

Production
- Executive producers: Dennis Miller; Kevin C. Slattery; Eddie Feldmann
- Producers: Jeff Cesario; Adam R. Markowitz; Colleen Grillo; Michele DeVoe; David Feldman; Leah Krinsky; José Arroyo; Jim Hanna
- Production locations: CBS Television City; Hollywood, California
- Running time: 30 minutes
- Production companies: Home Box Office; Happy Family Productions

Original release
- Network: HBO
- Release: April 22, 1994 – August 30, 2002

Related
- TV: The Dennis Miller Show (1992), Radio: The Dennis Miller Show (2007–2015)

Dennis Miller Live is an American weekly late-night talk show on HBO, hosted by comedian Dennis Miller. The show ran 215 episodes from 1994 to 2002, and received five Emmy awards and 11 Emmy nominations. It was also nominated six times for the Writers Guild of America Award for Best Writing for a Comedy/Variety Series and won three times.

The show was the idea of HBO executive producer Michael Fuchs, who told Miller he could use any forum he wanted as long as he brought in the numbers. It was directed by Debbie Palacio for most of its run, and head writers were first Jeff Cesario and then Eddie Feldmann. Other writers included José Arroyo, Rich Dahm, Ed Driscoll, David Feldman, Mike Gandolfi, Jim Hanna, Tom Hertz, Leah Krinsky, Rob Kutner, Rick Overton, Jacob Sager Weinstein, and David S. Weiss.

== Format ==
The show had a small set without a house band. It mainly consisted of Miller speaking to the largely unseen studio audience on a darkened stage. The show's cold opening started with Miller doing a brief joke about a current event.

The credit sequence showed Miller in a pool hall playing by himself set to "Everybody Wants to Rule the World" by Tears for Fears, though music was changed in later seasons for cost reasons. In later seasons, the sequence was changed to show oversized toppling dominoes featuring images of political and social leaders.

Then Miller would perform a two-part monologue which often segued into a stream-of-consciousness "rant" that became Miller's trademark, starting with the catchphrase "Now I don't want to get off on a rant here..." and ended with the phrase "Of course, that's just my opinion, I could be wrong." Books that compiled these monologues were released, starting with 1996's The Rants and ending with 2002's The Rant Zone.

Miller would discuss the topic of the day with one guest per show. During the guest segment, the show would also take phone calls. The call-in number was originally given as 1-800-LACTOSE. Reportedly, Miller chose the word "lactose" because it was the only word he could make with seven digits to make it a vanity number.

At the end of the interview, Miller would tell the guest "Stick around, I've gotta go do the news". Black-and-white photographs from newspapers would be shown, and Miller would make humorous captions regarding them. At the finish of this segment, Miller would harken back to his SNL days by saying "That's the news, and I am outta here!"
