= Sultan Pepper =

American screenwriter

Sultan Pepper (April 22, 1962 – October 20, 2009) was an American comedy writer who worked on the Ben Stiller Show and Mad TV. Pepper won an Emmy Award for Outstanding Writing in a Variety or Music Program for The Ben Stiller Show in 1993.

== The Ben Stiller Show ==
Pepper won The Ben Stiller Show's 1993 Emmy Award for "outstanding individual achievement in writing in a variety or music program", according to The Hollywood Reporter. Pepper was the only woman on The Ben Stiller Show writing team, which included David Cross, Ben Stiller and Judd Apatow.

== Nickelodeon and after ==
Pepper later wrote for the HBO educational children's show Crashbox as well as the Nickelodeon animated series CatDog. She also worked as a writer for the late-night television talk show The Stephanie Miller Show during the 1990s.

== 2000s ==
In the 2000s, Pepper worked both as a writer and producer for the United States version of Don't Forget Your Toothbrush game show as well as Street Smarts and the reality show Blind Date.

Pepper was contracted for a one-year development deal with Sony/Columbia Tri-Star Television beginning in 2002. While with Sony/Columbia TriStar, Pepper wrote and produced on the television shows Pyramid, Shipmates and The Rerun Show.

Pepper also wrote for the FOX Saturday night sketch comedy show Mad TV for two seasons. The show's writing team, which included Pepper, was nominated for Writers Guild of America Awards in 2004 and 2005.

Pepper died in Murrieta, California, on October 20, 2009, at age 47.
