= Jay Jurden =

American comedian

- Born: Mississippi, U.S.
- Education: University of Mississippi (BA), University of Alabama (MFA)
- Occupations: Actor, writer, comedian
- Spouse: Garrison Gibbons (married 2022-present)

Jay Jurden is an American comedian, writer, and actor. His work has been recognized by Just for Laughs, Time Out New York, Vulture, and Variety. He was a staff writer for The Problem with Jon Stewart.

== Life and career ==
Jurden was raised in Jackson, Mississippi. He received his bachelor's degree in theatre and acting from Ole Miss. He attended University of Alabama for his MFA in acting, for which he performed a short stand-up set. Jurden relocated to New York City and began doing open mics. His material often draws on his experiences as a Black, queer person from the American south.

In 2019 he performed a stand-up set on The Tonight Show. He released his first comedy album Jay Jurden, Y'all in 2020, which debuted at number one on iTunes. He did The Late Late Show with James Corden in 2022. His debut stand-up special, Yes Ma'am, is streaming on Hulu.

His writing has appeared in Teen Vogue, McSweeney's, and The New Yorker. Jurden was a staff writer for the Apple TV+ series The Problem with Jon Stewart, for which he received three nominations for Writers Guild of America Awards.

== Personal life ==
Jurden is bisexual. On July 10, 2022, Jurden married Garrison Gibbons.

== Accolades ==
- 2019 – Just for Laughs, New Faces
- 2019 – Time Out New York, Comedians To Watch
- 2020 – Vulture, The Comedians You Should and Will Know in 2020
- 2022 – Variety, 10 Comics to Watch

== Awards and nominations ==
=== For The Problem with Jon Stewart ===
- 2022 – Nominee, Writers Guild of America Award for Comedy/Variety Talk Series
- 2023 – Nominee, Writers Guild of America Award for Comedy/Variety Talk Series
- 2023 – Nominee, Writers Guild of America Award for Comedy/Variety Specials (for "Election Wrap-Up Special")
