= Kevin Dorff =

American actor and comedian (born 1966)

- Born: August 2, 1966 (age 59); Chicago, Illinois, U.S.
- Occupations: Actor; comedian; writer
- Years active: 2001–present

Kevin Dorff (born August 2, 1966) is an American actor and comedian known for his work as a writer and sketch performer on Late Night with Conan O'Brien and The Tonight Show with Conan O'Brien, the former of which he won a Primetime Emmy for in 2007. Dorff co-starred as "Mike the Federal Agent" on the first season of the Adult Swim series Delocated with his former Late Night colleague Jon Glaser. His character was written off the show at the start of season two, as Dorff was in Los Angeles writing for The Tonight Show at the time, while Delocated is filmed in New York City. Dorff returned to work on Delocated as a writer in season three. He has recently been a writer for Review and has made one appearance on the show.

Dorff has made guest appearances on television programs such as TV Funhouse, Nick Swardson's Pretend Time, Important Things with Demetri Martin, 30 Rock, Parks and Recreation, The Office, Detroiters, Arrested Development, and Brooklyn Nine-Nine. In 2019, he portrayed Bill O'Reilly in the film Bombshell.

Dorff rose to prominence as a main stage cast member of the famed Second City improv troupe in Chicago during the mid-to-late '90s. He was part of the "Paradigm Lost" revue alongside Scott Adsit, Rachel Dratch, and Tina Fey. The cast was featured in a documentary about the show's production, Second To None, produced by WTTW.

== Recurring characters on Late Night with Conan O'Brien ==
- Coked-up Werewolf
- Jesus Christ
- Mansy the half-man/half-pansy
- Joe's Bartender
- Todd the Tiny Guy
- Crazy Chainsaw Murderer Guy
