= John Crane (screenwriter) =

American writer and actor

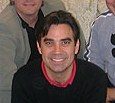
- John Crane
- Born: John Rene Crane; March 20, 1962 (age 64) New Orleans, Louisiana, U.S.
- Occupation: Writer, actor, producer
- Years active: 1992–2016

John Rene Crane (born March 20, 1962) is an American writer and actor, best known as the head writer, executive producer and occasional performer on Fox's Saturday late night sketch comedy program, MADtv, and as the Dad from Nickelodeon’s Roundhouse.

== Career ==
Crane started in show business working local comedy clubs in the New Orleans area, and then earned a spot as a cast member of Cheap Theatrix, a New Orleans sketch comedy group written and produced by Buddy Sheffield. Crane moved to Los Angeles, California, in the mid-1980s and worked briefly as the director of Universal Studios' Star Trek Adventure. He was later admitted to the Groundlings comedy school where he wrote and performed with Will Ferrell, Cheri Oteri, Kathy Griffin, Michael McDonald and Chris Kattan, among others. Between stints with The Groundlings in the early 1990s, Crane co-wrote and starred in Nickelodeon's Saturday night ensemble variety series, Roundhouse, produced by Sheffield and his former spouse, Rita Hester. His most notable recurring role on Roundhouse was as the children's father, who rode around the set in a motorized recliner. Roundhouse was canceled after four seasons.

In the mid-1990s, Crane was a cast member on the syndicated children's TV show AJ's Time Travelers and earned a number of small on-screen TV roles, including spots on Baywatch, Love Boat: The Next Wave, Murder Live!, Night Stand with Dick Dietrick and Alien Avengers. He had several supporting roles in movies such as Body Waves, Blood Fist IV, Richie Rich Christmas Wish and The Hole. He also wrote a number of episodes for the popular cartoon Johnny Bravo. Crane was later hired to write and produce Nickelodeon's hit series Rocket Power, and wrote a number of episodes of Nickelodeon's CatDog and at least one episode of Jimmy Neutron.

Crane joined the writing staff at MADtv in 2000 and was promoted to head writer in 2006. He was promoted to Executive Producer/Show Runner in 2007. In addition to a few minor roles, Crane has appeared on MADtv as Choppy, a semi-recurring character who annoys others with his grating voice, loud boom box, strange dance moves and oversized Big Gulp soda. Crane also consulted on the Victoria Beckham reality TV show, Coming to America. In 2010, he wrote a half-hour comedy pilot entitled "Wee Hours" for TNT based on characters created by members of The Second City in Chicago. Crane continues to work in comedy and animation and credits include the Disney Channel-produced animated series Dude, That's My Ghost, Packages from Planet X, and Boyster. In 2013, Crane wrote a live action comedy pilot, "Smartphone", for Nickelodeon with Bruce Leddy, former director of MADtv.
