= Leah Krinsky =

American comedy writer

Leah Krinsky is an American comedy writer and producer. She is a two-time Primetime Emmy Award winner and a two-time Writers Guild of America Award winner. She has written for Dennis Miller Live, for which she won an Emmy in 1998.

== Filmography ==
- Funny Ladies - Volume 3 (2004)
