= Rich Talarico =

American television writer and producer (born 1973)

- Born: August 25, 1973 (age 52); Frankfort, New York, United States
- Occupations: Writer, producer, actor, director, comedian
- Website: www.richtalarico.com

Rich Talarico (born August 25, 1973) is an American television writer and producer, best known for his work on Comedy Central's Key & Peele.

== Early and personal life ==
Rich was born in Frankfort, New York. He attended the local high school, and caught the acting bug performing in high school musicals and doing stand-up comedy. He took graphic design courses at Mohawk Valley Community College, but moved to Chicago to study at the famed Second City Theatre.

== Career ==
In 1992, Talarico moved to Chicago, took his first improv class with Stephen Colbert at The Second City, and earned a position with Second City's National Touring Company. Talarico went on to co-create five original sketch comedy revues for the company's ETC. and Main stages.

While in Chicago, Rich was also involved at Improv Olympic (now iO), under the direction of Charna Halpern and the late Del Close. At iO he played on house teams "Mr. Blonde" and "Faulty Wiring," and co-created the long-form improv shows "Strap Heads," "Trio," "Close Quarters," and "Dasariski." He also played with the early casts of the long-running "Armando Diaz Experience, Theatrical Movement, and Hootenanny."

In 2001 Talarico relocated to Los Angeles to write and produce for the sketch comedy series Mad TV. His work at Mad TV earned him three Writers Guild Award nominations.

Rich has written for NBC's Saturday Night Live, co-produced The Naked Trucker and T-Bones Show for Comedy Central, wrote and produced TBS's Frank TV, served as a monologue and staff writer for NBC's The Tonight Show With Jay Leno, writer and performer for HBO's The Sketch Pad, and most recently was a writer and performer for Review, also on Comedy Central. Talarico has also written for "Key and Peele", being the writer who wrote their most famous sketch, the substitute who mispronounces names (A-Aron).

Rich has directed dozens of short films, many of which have appeared in festivals like the L.A. Comedy Shorts Film Festival, and the Just for Laughs Shorts Festival at the Gene Siskel Film Center in Chicago. He wrote and directed a corporate video series for the company Geek Eyewear, and most recently directed CC Social Scene, a sketch/comedy improv series for Comedy Central Digital, which is hosted by Paul Scheer.

Talarico has appeared as an actor in several TV commercials, most notably A&W Rootbeer's Mr. Dumass. He has also appeared in small roles on Late Night With Conan O'Brien, Early Edition, What About Joan?, Review, and the feature film High Fidelity.

Rich Talarico performs and teaches long-form improv comedy and sketch writing in festivals and at theaters all over the country. He can be seen performing live improv regularly at the iOWest in Los Angeles as a part of the fan and critically acclaimed improvisation trio, "Dasariski."

== Awards and nominations ==
- Peabody Award (Won, Key & Peele, 2013)
- American Emmy Award (Nominated, Key & Peele, 2014)
- Writers Guild of America Award (3 Nominations, Mad TV, 2001, 2002, 2003)
- American Comedy Award (Nominated, Key & Peele, 2014)
- People's Choice Award (Nominated, Key & Peele, 2015)
- NAACP Image Award (Show Nomination, "Outstanding Comedy Series" for Key & Peele, 2015)
