= Andy Blitz =

American actor

- Born: June 28, 1971 (age 54); New York City
- Education: Columbia University (BA)
- Occupations: Comedian; writer; producer; actor
- Family: Jeffrey Blitz (brother)

Andrew Blitz (born June 28, 1971) is an American comedian, writer, producer and actor best known for his sketch comedy and writing work on the late-night talk show Late Night with Conan O'Brien. He has received eight Emmy Award nominations.

== Early life and education ==
Blitz was born in New York City and grew up in Ridgewood, New Jersey, where he attended Ridgewood High School, graduating as part of the class of 1989. He graduated from Columbia University in 1994.

== Career ==
By 1999 he had established himself as a fixture of New York City's stand-up comedy scene, performing regularly at the now-defunct Luna Lounge; in that same year he began his work on Late Night. Since leaving Late Night, Blitz has worked as a writer, executive producer and guest actor on the Comedy Central series Review and worked as a writer and co-executive producer on the Netflix series Master of None. Blitz previously wrote for the Adult Swim series Eagleheart starring Chris Elliott, Maria Thayer and Brett Gelman. Blitz appeared in Season 4 of Arrested Development and the movie Table 19. He continues to perform stand-up comedy.

In 2024, Blitz joined the writing staff of Jason Kelce's ESPN talk show, They Call It Late Night with Jason Kelce. Jon Glaser and Tammy Sagher were also part of the writing staff. It premiered on ESPN January 5, 2025.

== Late Night with Conan O'Brien characters ==
- As himself, going apartment-hunting with Conan, and shortly thereafter, with Conan helping to furnish his apartment. Blitz lugging his malfunctioning computer to a call center in Hyderabad, India. Blitz hailing a New York City yellow cab and taking it all the way to Toronto, Canada due to his fear of flying.
- Awful Sports Chanter
- Chuck Aloo, of the parody series "60"
- Leonard Diesel, Vin Diesel's timid brother. (Blitz later played a different character named Osama bin Diesel on the MTV sketch comedy series Human Giant.)
- A member of the singing trio The Slipnutz
- An elections supervisor during the 2000 Florida election recount, who constantly yelled at election volunteers and advised them, "If you don't know who the person voted for, you put the ballot in the milk!"
- A participant on "Masturdate," a parody of dating shows.
- A ghost rejected from the novel A Christmas Carol

== Personal ==
Blitz is the brother of filmmaker Jeffrey Blitz, who is best known for directing the 2002 documentary Spellbound and the 2007 film Rocket Science.

== Filmography ==
=== Acting ===
==== Film ====
Year	Title	Role	Notes
2017	Table 19	Notorious Donny Haczyk	

==== Television ====
Year	Title	Role	Notes
2000–2007	Late Night with Conan O'Brien	Various character	200 episodes; also writer
2001	Everything But the Girl	Narducci	Television film
2004	Comedy Lab	Eugene's Friend	Episode: "12:21"
2005	Cheap Seats	Sam	Episode: "1998 World Series of Poker"
2007–2008	Human Giant	Osama Bin Diesel / Tony Woliner	5 episodes
2010	Important Things with Demetri Martin	Various	Episode: "Control"
2011	Eagleheart	Onlooker	Episode: "The Human Bat"
2013	Arrested Development	Addict	Episode: "Indian Takers
2014	Review	Igor	Episode: "Marry; Run; Party"
2017	The Fake News with Ted Nelms	Stevie Rivera	Episode #1.1
2018	Ghosted	Bird	14 episodes

=== Writing ===
==== Television ====
Year	Title	Notes
1999–2007	Late Night with Conan O'Brien	798 episodes
2003	Late Night with Conan O'Brien: 10th Anniversary Special	Television special
2007, 2008	Human Giant	8 episodes; also consultant writer
2009–2010	Important Things with Demetri Martin	17 episodes
2010	Night of Too Many Stars	Television special
2011	Eagleheart	Episode: "Susie's Song"
2014–2017	Review	12 episodes; also producer
2015	Why? with Hannibal Buress	8 episodes
2015, 2017	Master of None	2 episodes; also producer
2017	The Fake News with Ted Nelms	Episode #1.1
2018	Ghosted	Episode: "The Airplane"; also producer
2021	Liza on Demand	Episode: "Hatumentary"; also executive producer

== See also ==
- List of Late Night with Conan O'Brien sketches
