= Jim Hanna (writer) =

American comedy writer

Jim Hanna is an American comedy writer. He has written for Dennis Miller Live, for which he shared a 1994 Primetime Emmy for Outstanding Writing for a Variety or Music Program.
