= The Dennis Miller Show =

- Genre: Late-night talk show/comedy
- Starring: Dennis Miller
- Announcer: Nick Bakay
- Music by: Bandleader; Andy Summers (January–February); David Goldblatt (February–July)
- Composer: Andy Summers
- Country of origin: United States
- No. of seasons: 1
- No. of episodes: 125

Production
- Production locations: KTLA-TV; Hollywood, California
- Running time: 60 minutes
- Production companies: Brillstein-Grey Productions (1992) (season 1); Brillstein-Grey Entertainment (1992) (season 1); Tribune Entertainment

Original release
- Network: syndication
- Release: January 20 – July 24, 1992

Related
- Dennis Miller Live, The Dennis Miller Show (radio)

The Dennis Miller Show is an American syndicated late-night talk show created by and starring comedian Dennis Miller. The show launched in January 1992 and was hosted by the former Saturday Night Live Weekend Update anchor as an attempt by syndicator Tribune Entertainment Company to carve out a niche in the late-night television landscape; an opportunity to do so was anticipated due to Johnny Carson's retirement from The Tonight Show that May and his replacement by Jay Leno. Miller's show was unable to build a significant audience, however, and was cancelled after seven months.

The show was taped at Tribune's KTLA Studios, 5800 Sunset Boulevard in Hollywood.

== Background ==
=== 1989—1992 American late-night TV landscape ===
From the January 1989 launch of Arsenio Hall's Paramount-syndicated late-night show, its immediate ability to carve out a niche and compete against the legacy late night leader, Johnny Carson's Tonight Show on NBC, turned a lot of heads. Having observed Hall's and Paramount's success with younger viewers as well as in attracting an audience entirely new to late night, the Chicago-based first-run syndicator Tribune Entertainment Company (that had mostly been known for its daytime programs Geraldo and The Joan Rivers Show) felt the conditions for a competitive entry of their own in the late night race—an arena dominated by Carson for decades—were finally in place.

In 1990, Tribune Entertainment Company pursued Garry Shandling for a syndicated late-night talk show through the performer's representative talent agency, Brillstein-Grey Entertainment. When Shandling turned the offer down, Brillsten-Grey recommended Dennis Miller, another one of their clients.

The drive for Tribune to shift preparations for their planned new show into higher gear increased in May 1991, when Johnny Carson announced he would be retiring from The Tonight Show one year later. As NBC announced its decision that Jay Leno would take Carson's place, and since the time slot was at that point only contested by The Arsenio Hall Show, Tribune felt that if Leno could not hold onto Carson's audience they might migrate to a newer show. Thirty-seven-year-old stand-up comedian and television performer Miller—finishing up the 1990-91 season, his sixth, on NBC's Saturday Night Live weekly sketch comedy series where he had primarily been hosting the Weekend Update satirical news segment—was approached with a Monday-through-Friday late-night show offer whereby Tribune Entertainment would distribute the new program and Miller would co-produce it with the Brillstein-Grey Company. Miller and the others involved felt even more secure in their position when Leno was picked to replace Carson over Late Night host David Letterman, who would eventually end up getting his own show at CBS, Late Show with David Letterman.

== History ==
=== Early days ===
On January 20, 1992, following his departure from Saturday Night Live, Miller launched the late-night TV talk show The Dennis Miller Show, syndicated by Tribune Entertainment. The Dennis Miller Show continued in the tradition of "alternative" talk shows, starting with Late Night with David Letterman, which debuted on NBC in 1982. The show remained faithful to the classic talk-show format with a desk and three or four guests a night, while Miller carried forward the spirit of his SNL Weekend Update with a newscast segment that aired on Fridays. In support of the show's premiere, Tribune made use of extensive advertising in trade publications and on-air promotions and also used a billboard promotion on Sunset Boulevard.

Nick Bakay was the announcer, and Andy Summers, formerly of the band The Police, led the house band. The show's staff boasted a mix of past and future performers, writers, and producers of note including Mark Brazill (That '70s Show), Eddie Feldmann, David Kohan and Max Mutchnick (creators of Will & Grace), Norm Macdonald, Bob Odenkirk (Mr. Show), John Riggi, Herb Sargent (Saturday Night Live), Drake Sather, Dave Thomas (Second City TV), and Leo Benvenuti and Steve Rudnick (writers of The Santa Clause and Space Jam).

Guests included Mountain (with Leslie West and Corky Laing), Toad the Wet Sprocket (who made their national television debut on the show), Henry Rollins (who appeared repeatedly to chat with Miller and perform spoken word), Primus (who while performing "Tommy the Cat", had to deal with a member of the audience who jumped onstage—whom Miller playfully tried to "tackle"), King's X (who performed two songs, "Black Flag" and "It's Love" to empty seats in the studio due to the 1992 Los Angeles riots), and comedian Bill Hicks.

Miller thought there would be room for his show, as its main competitors for the time slot would be The Tonight Show with Jay Leno and The Arsenio Hall Show, and he felt they all attracted different audiences. At the time, Arsenio Hall was not worried about Jay Leno's hold on late night, but told the Los Angeles Times, "Dennis Miller is the only one who scares me, because I have tremendous respect for him and think he's one of the brightest comics on the scene."

The show opened to mixed reviews, with some being "blisteringly negative", but Tribune remained optimistic, saying that a 2 rating nationally would be acceptable, due to the late hour of the show, and pointing out that, in some locations, Miller was doing better than Hall. As the show progressed, national ratings were still behind Hall (whose show was also syndicated). In the first five weeks of Miller's show, the national A.C. Nielsen Co. rating was 1.8 (around 1.6 million homes) to Hall's 3.4 over the same time-period. Media watchers noted that, in contrast, Hall's 1989 debut had numbers between 3 and 3.5, and that the industry standard for long-term survival at the time was a minimum of 2. In order to address this shortfall and in anticipation of Carson leaving and his audience being up for grabs, Tribune began making changes to the show.

In February 1992, Andy Summers announced that, after helping to launch the show and writing its theme music, he should move on to focus instead on his solo career. Summers had developed a different musical vision for the show than the traditional rock 'n' roll that Tribune wanted. He was replaced by David Goldblatt, who had been Diana Ross's musical director for her 1989 world tour.

By March 1992, Tribune Entertainment decided it wanted more of the show's focus to be on Miller and his comedy and less on the guests, as testing had shown the audience tuned in for Miller's opening monologue but often tuned away when he was talking to guests. To facilitate this change, Ken Ehrlich was moved to being a musical consultant and replaced in his co-executive-producer duties by Laurence Ferber, who had been able to restructure The Joan Rivers Show to increase ratings by bringing it more in line with her personality. It was also at this time that Dave Thomas was brought in as a writer to "open up the comedy", with the hope he could develop bits for Miller where he would interact more with the audience. Tribune remained optimistic that the numbers could rise and pointed out that the show had strong demographics, skewing heavily towards young men—a target audience for many advertisers. Media watchers noted that Tribune had lowered its ad prices since failing to live up to its original ratings estimates. Tribune insisted that "We don't think of our shows in terms of some kind of death period," and pointed out that it took two years for The Joan Rivers Show, then in its fourth year, to get off the ground.

=== "The Booking Wars" ===
To differentiate himself from Arsenio, Miller wanted to have a mix of Hollywood celebrities, authors, and political figures on the show, early on having guests like Larry Miller, Sally Kirkland, Clive Barker, Michael Kinsley, Tom Hanks, Christian Slater, Bonnie Raitt, Al Gore, and Benjamin Netanyahu.

A few weeks in, the show began encountering problems booking guests, with some media outlets such as the Dallas Morning News wondering if it was Miller's interview style, where "Miller messes around with them as best he can, looking for openings to throw a jab or two or 10." In response, Miller said he did not want to always be "a faceless, selfless conduit of information", nor another Larry King—saying one or two words between guests' speeches—nor Arsenio Hall, who was seen as fawning over guests on his show. Miller felt he was attracting an audience that wanted a "different, funky vibe".

Some controversy occurred around an episode involving guest performance artist Karen Finley. In her piece, she characterized abortion as pouring Drano into a woman's vagina and said she wanted to "feminize the planet to overthrow this male control of our lives." Afterwards, Miller interviewed her and defended her right of expression. Tribune later pulled the episode from its scheduled July 14 air-time, then cut out her segment and aired the rest on July 17. Finley accused the show of censoring her, telling a reporter, "I think Dennis Miller is just as bad as Jesse Helms. What's the difference?". Tribune said that they had taken this action not for political reasons but "the inappropriateness of including the segment in a music, comedy and light-entertainment program".

The main reason the show had problems booking guests was that Helen Kushnick, executive producer for The Tonight Show with Jay Leno—as well as Leno's longtime manager, producer, and close friend)—let it be known that anyone appearing on a competing talk show would never be invited on Leno's program. As accusations of unethical booking pressures were made first by Hall and then by Miller, the media began to describe the situation as "The Booking Wars."

Miller, realizing upfront that his show would have trouble competing with more established late-night talk shows, told his show's talent booker not to attempt to compete for famous guests. Instead he wanted to go after "fringe players" and, invoking Gertrude Stein, said he wanted to set a mood of "an eclectic sense of salon." He later recalled that even this approach did not prevent problems with Leno's show. Miller's talent booker had booked the Aboriginal band Yothu Yindi, whom Miller described as "It's like five guys in thongs with small logs beating big logs". To Miller's astonishment, Yothu Yindi cancelled their appearance because they were worried that if they appeared on his show they would be banned from the Tonight Show. Miller called Leno and complained loudly and with expletives, so they "butted heads for a while". Miller and Leno did not talk to each other for several years afterwards. While Yothu Yindi did wind up appearing on the show, P. J. O'Rourke, who after a six-month negotiation was set to appear on the show, cancelled and appeared with Leno. Miller openly denounced O'Rourke on his show. He even pleaded for guests on air, giving the show's office number. Rather than just rely on the talent agent, Miller began calling people personally to invite them to be guests on his show.

=== Cancellation ===
On July 17, 1992, Tribune Entertainment announced it was cancelling Miller's show due to poor ratings. Donald Hacker, its president and chief executive officer, said, "After a tremendous effort on the parts of all parties involved, we've made a business decision not to proceed." The last show was July 24, 1992. Tribune issued an odd, single-spaced, five-page press release that praised the show, its ratings, its guests and its segments (while no mention was made of profits). Tribune also took out a two-page ad spread in The Hollywood Reporter, which thanked Miller and the guests of his show. Despite Tribune Entertainment having promised Miller a nine-month commitment, the show was cancelled after seven months, with Hacker citing that the show wasn't making the ratings growth needed to continue. Arsenio Hall, still angered by "The Booking Wars," reacted to the news of Miller's cancellation by saying, "He should be staying and punk-ass Leno should be going."

During the final week of Miller's show, taped after the cancellation press release, he announced a 1-900 phone number for fans to call and ask for the show to be continued. The number received around 150,000 calls and the charge for calling it made between $40,000 to $50,000, which was donated to the Pediatric AIDS Foundation. Miller said he was touched by the outpouring and said he had only expected at most 20,000 calls. Also during the final week, he took on a sharper edge that, to reviewers such as Phil Rosenthal, showed "just how much unfulfilled promise the show held for the same viewers who love NBC's Late Night With David Letterman or even Comedy Central's cult favorite Night After Night with Allan Havey." This included Miller jokingly looking into the camera and begging CBS Entertainment president Jeff Sagansky for a job; having Julia Sweeney appear as her androgynous SNL character Pat and serenade him, mimicking Bette Midler's song for the retiring Johnny Carson; and, when a skit began to fail, moving the man with the cue-cards on camera. On his last show, Miller, mimicking political party nomination races, said, "I release all my delegates to Arsenio and David Letterman." The final moments of the show featured Miller using a rope ladder to climb towards an (unseen) helicopter, in mock recreation of an iconic image of a helicopter evacuating the US embassy at the end of the Vietnam War. Soon after his final show, Miller made an appearance on Hall's show.

Miller also openly complained that getting guests had become increasingly difficult after Leno took over from Carson. He began openly accusing Leno's agent Helen Kushnick of unethical strong-arm booking tactics, a charge previously made by Arsenio Hall. Miller blasted Leno and Kushnick's press conference earlier that month that denied such tactics were being used. After the cancellation, Miller told an interviewer, "I don't like Jay and The Tonight Show. We just had problems, and I don't like the way they do business. There are ways to book shows and be tactful about it. Arsenio is very classy about it. The other show is not very tactful about it." Elsewhere, Miller said that while he had only met Hall twice, "He's a legitimate human being who doesn't bullshit you." He called Hall classy and expressed interest at becoming better friends. In contrast, he said of Leno, "Jay and I were very good friends at one point. I don’t think I'd talk to him again, nor would he want to talk to me." Reviewers held that, along with problems with booking guests, Miller had a tough time reconciling his caustic stand-up comedian stage presence that savaged his targets with that of an interviewer that would have to cozy up to his subjects—though he was getting better near the end.

=== Post-cancellation events and reactions ===
There was speculation about what Miller might do after the cancellation, with The Associated Press reporting that all four networks had approached his business manager after the cancellation. Miller went back to stand-up comedy, performing at colleges and preparing for an HBO special. He told a reporter, "Part of me would like to do another [talk show], but the other side says, 'Who needs the headaches?'. The competitive side of me wants to do another one, and I think something eventually will come up in TV."

When Leno's ratings began to erode a few months into taking the Tonight Show from Carson, Miller told a reporter that he had always anticipated as much but now was not in a position to capitalize on it. He also expressed some anger at Tribune for pulling the plug by July, rather than fulfilling its commitment to him, which was at least until September (a promise they had repeated as late as May). He felt they had "a short fuse" and the company "wasn't a fan of me." Elsewhere, he said, "I think they flinched. If you're going to get in you got to get in and stay there for a while."

Since Leno's late May 1992 takeover of The Tonight Show, the program had begun competing with Miller and Arsenio Hall for the same younger-skewing audiences and celebrity guests. The Tonight Show with Jay Leno executive producer Helen Kushnick's strong-arm booking practices came to a head by September 15, 1992. Country artists Travis Tritt and Trisha Yearwood—both clients of talent manager Ken Kragen—were dropped and banned from The Tonight Show, Kushnick's vengeful act against Kragen for his refusal of her request to cancel Tritt's already-booked appearance with Hall. By September 28, 1992, NBC announced, "Effective immediately, Helen Kushnick will no longer be the executive producer [of The Tonight Show]." Leno protested the move and expressed his continued support but, having been told by NBC that either she would be terminated or the both of them would be, did not make any ultimatums. Tonight Show insiders said Kushnick did not let Leno get involved in production or booking and lied to him if he asked questions about it, and the two of them "have this sick, twisted, Hitchcock mother-son thing going." Miller, despite having been proven correct about his claims about Kushnick and The Tonight Show, expressed an air of resignation about the whole experience, telling a reporter in November 1992, "Everything that Arsenio and I were saying has been borne out to be true, but that's old news now."

In a late January 1993 Rolling Stone interview, David Letterman—whose decision to leave NBC for CBS had just been announced weeks prior—was asked to offer an opinion on which comedian could take over his 12:30 a.m. NBC show once he departs within months. He mentioned Dana Carvey as a potentially suitable replacement, but pointed to Miller for the job due to enjoying his performances on The Dennis Miller Show that Letterman had apparently started watching just prior to its cancellation. The network eventually chose 30-year-old upstart performer Conan O'Brien.

Miller returned to late night in 1994 with HBO's weekly Dennis Miller Live, which ran for nine seasons and won five Primetime Emmy Awards.

In 1994, Leno fired Kushnick for, among other things, planting a story in the New York Post in 1991 that claimed NBC wanted Carson to retire so they could hire Leno and attract a younger audience and then lying to Leno that it was not she who planted the story. In 1995, after the Kushnick firing, Miller called Leno and they apologized to each other. Miller told a reporter, "I just got fed up in private and decided to call Jay earlier this week, because life is too short." Having re-established their friendship, Miller appeared on The Tonight Show on May 10, 1995, and Leno appeared on HBO's Dennis Miller Live on May 12, 1995. Miller appeared on Leno's show several times thereafter, even serving as one of several stand-in comedians delivering Michael Jackson jokes when Leno was under a court-ordered gag order during Jackson's 2005 trial.
