= List of awards and nominations received by Last Week Tonight with John Oliver =

Last Week Tonight with John Oliver accolades
- Title card for the show
Awards and nominations
Award	Wins	Nominations
ACE Eddie Awards	1	5
Astra TV Awards	2	6
Critics' Choice Real TV Awards	2	3
Critics' Choice Television Awards	5	8
Directors Guild of America Awards	0	9
Dorian Awards	4	13
Environmental Media Awards	3	4
GLAAD Media Awards	2	7
Make-Up Artists & Hair Stylists Guild Awards	0	1
MTV Movie & TV Awards	0	1
Peabody Awards	3	3
People's Choice Awards	0	5
Primetime Emmy Awards	32	76
Producers Guild of America Awards	9	12
Television Academy Honors	1	1
Television Critics Association Awards	4	12
Webby Awards	2	4
Writers Guild of America Awards	9	11

Totals (Note: Certain award groups do not simply award one winner. They acknowledge several different recipients, have runners-up, and have third place. Since this is a specific recognition and is different from losing an award, runner-up mentions are considered wins in this award tally. For simplification and to avoid errors, each award in this list has been presumed to have had a prior nomination.)
- Wins: 78
- Nominations: 181

Last Week Tonight with John Oliver (often abridged as Last Week Tonight) is an American late-night talk and news satire television program hosted by comedian John Oliver. The half-hour-long show was created by Oliver and premiered on HBO on April 27, 2014. From 2006 to 2013, Oliver was a correspondent on Jon Stewart's The Daily Show; after his interim role as host for eight weeks received positive reviews, HBO announced that the comedian would receive his own late-night show. His initial contract was extended through 2017 in February 2015, through 2020 in September 2017, through 2023 in September 2020, and through 2026 in December 2023. The show has been running for twelve seasons; the twelfth premiered on February 16, 2025. Oliver, Tim Carvell, Liz Stanton, Jon Thoday, and James Taylor are executive producers of the show.

Last Week Tonight has received generally positive reviews (Note: Last Week Tonight has a score of 76 based on 14 critic reviews on Metacritic.) and been nominated for numerous major awards, including 76 Primetime Emmy Awards (32 wins), 3 Peabody Awards (3 wins), 12 Producers Guild of America Awards (9 wins), 11 Writers Guild of America Awards (9 wins), 9 Directors Guild of America Awards (no wins), 8 Critics' Choice Television Awards (5 wins), 12 TCA Awards (4 wins), 13 Dorian Awards (4 wins), 7 GLAAD Media Awards (2 wins), and 4 Webby Awards (2 wins). Oliver has received 3 nominations for hosting (winning 1), the writing team has received 12 consecutive nominations for the Primetime Emmy Award for Outstanding Writing for a Variety Series (winning 10), and the editors have received 17 nominations for the Primetime Emmy Award for Outstanding Picture Editing for Variety Programming (winning 5).

== Awards and nominations ==
Award	Year (Note: The listed year refers to the date of the ceremony.)	Category	Nominee(s)	Result	Ref(s)
ACE Eddie Awards	2022	Best Edited Variety Talk/Sketch Show or Special	Ryan Barger and Anthony Miale (for "Union Busting")	Nominated	
ACE Eddie Awards	2023	Best Edited Variety Talk/Sketch Show or Special	Ryan Barger and Anthony Miale (for "Police Interrogations")	Nominated	
ACE Eddie Awards	2024	Best Edited Variety Talk/Sketch Show or Special	Anthony Miale (for "Dollar Stores")	Nominated	
ACE Eddie Awards	2025	Best Edited Variety Talk/Sketch Show or Special	Anthony Miale (for "Boeing")	Won	
ACE Eddie Awards	2026	Best Edited Variety Talk/Sketch Show or Special	Anthony Miale (for "Medicare Advantage")	Nominated	
Astra TV Awards (formerly Hollywood Critics Association TV Awards)	2021	Best Broadcast Network or Cable Sketch Series, Variety Series, Talk Show, or Comedy/Variety Special	Last Week Tonight with John Oliver	Won	
Astra TV Awards (formerly Hollywood Critics Association TV Awards)	2022	Best Broadcast Network or Cable Variety Sketch Series, Talk Series, or Special	Last Week Tonight with John Oliver	Nominated	
Astra TV Awards (formerly Hollywood Critics Association TV Awards)	2024 (1) (Note: The 3rd Astra TV Awards ceremony, originally scheduled for August 12–13, 2023, was postponed, resulting in two ceremonies being held in 2024. The delayed 3rd Astra TV Awards ceremony was held on January 8, 2024, and the 4th Astra TV Awards ceremony was held on December 8, 2024.)	Best Variety Series or Special	Last Week Tonight with John Oliver	Nominated	
Astra TV Awards (formerly Hollywood Critics Association TV Awards)	2024 (2)	Best Variety Series or Special	Last Week Tonight with John Oliver	Nominated	
Astra TV Awards (formerly Hollywood Critics Association TV Awards)	2025	Best Variety Series or Special	Last Week Tonight with John Oliver	Won	
Astra TV Awards (formerly Hollywood Critics Association TV Awards)	2026	Best Talk or Variety Series	Last Week Tonight with John Oliver	Nominated	
Critics' Choice Real TV Awards	2019	Best Late Night Talk Show	Last Week Tonight with John Oliver	Won (Note: Tie with The Late Late Show with James Corden)	
Critics' Choice Real TV Awards	2021	Best Show Host	John Oliver	Won	
Critics' Choice Real TV Awards	2022	Best Show Host	John Oliver	Nominated	
Critics' Choice Television Awards	2015	Best Talk Show	Last Week Tonight with John Oliver	Nominated	
Critics' Choice Television Awards	2016 (1) (Note: As a result of the Critics' Choice Awards merging with the Critics' Choice Television Awards, two ceremonies were held in 2016. The 21st Critics' Choice Awards ceremony was held on January 17, 2016, and the 22nd Critics' Choice Awards ceremony was held on December 11, 2016.)	Best Talk Show	Last Week Tonight with John Oliver	Won	
Critics' Choice Television Awards	2016 (2)	Best Talk Show	Last Week Tonight with John Oliver	Nominated	
Critics' Choice Television Awards	2020	Best Talk Show	Last Week Tonight with John Oliver	Nominated	
Critics' Choice Television Awards	2022	Best Talk Show	Last Week Tonight with John Oliver	Won	
Critics' Choice Television Awards	2023	Best Talk Show	Last Week Tonight with John Oliver	Won	
Critics' Choice Television Awards	2024	Best Talk Show	Last Week Tonight with John Oliver	Won	
Critics' Choice Television Awards	2026	Best Variety Series	Last Week Tonight with John Oliver	Won	
Directors Guild of America Awards	2018	Outstanding Directorial Achievement in Variety/Talk/News/Sports – Regularly Scheduled Programming	Paul Pennolino (for "French Elections") (Note: Pennolino's directorial team includes Elliot Mendelson as associate director and Mark McKenna and Susan Schroer as stage managers.)	Nominated	
Directors Guild of America Awards	2019	Outstanding Directorial Achievement in Variety/Talk/News/Sports – Regularly Scheduled Programming	Paul Pennolino (for "Italian Elections") (Note: Pennolino's directorial team includes Elliot Mendelson as associate director and Mark McKenna and Craig Spinney as stage managers.)	Nominated	
Directors Guild of America Awards	2020	Outstanding Directorial Achievement in Variety/Talk/News/Sports – Regularly Scheduled Programming	Paul Pennolino and Christopher Werner (for "SLAPP Suits") (Note: Pennolino and Werner's directorial team includes Elliot Mendelson as associate director and Mark McKenna, Craig Spinney, and John Scott Wilson as stage managers.)	Nominated	
Directors Guild of America Awards	2021	Outstanding Directorial Achievement in Variety/Talk/News/Sports – Regularly Scheduled Programming	Christopher Werner (for "Trump & Election Results") (Note: Werner's directorial team includes John Scott Wilson as associate director, Dino Castelli as stage manager, and Demian Resnick as location manager.)	Nominated	
Directors Guild of America Awards	2022	Outstanding Directorial Achievement in Variety/Talk/News/Sports – Regularly Scheduled Programming	Paul Pennolino and Christopher Werner (for "Episode 830 – Season Finale") (Note: Pennolino and Werner's directorial team includes Elliot Mendelson as associate director and Mark McKenna and Craig Spinney as stage managers.)	Nominated	
Directors Guild of America Awards	2023	Outstanding Directorial Achievement in Variety/Talk/News/Sports – Regularly Scheduled Programming	Paul Pennolino (for "Afghanistan") (Note: Pennolino's directorial team includes Elliot Mendelson as associate director and Jeff Leib, Mark McKenna, and Craig Spinney as stage managers.)	Nominated	
Directors Guild of America Awards	2024	Outstanding Directorial Achievement in Variety/Talk/News/Sports – Regularly Scheduled Programming	Paul Pennolino (for "Dollar Stores") (Note: Pennolino's directorial team includes Elliot Mendelson as associate director and Jeff Leib, Mark McKenna, Craig Spinney, and Steven Van Patten as stage managers.)	Nominated	
Directors Guild of America Awards	2025	Outstanding Directorial Achievement in Variety/Talk/News/Sports – Regularly Scheduled Programming	Paul Pennolino (for "India Elections") (Note: Pennolino's directorial team includes Elliot Mendelson as associate director and Jeff Leib, Mark McKenna, and Craig Spinney as stage managers.)	Nominated	
Directors Guild of America Awards	2026	Outstanding Directorial Achievement in Variety	Paul Pennolino (for "Public Media") (Note: Pennolino's directorial team includes Elliot Mendelson as associate director and Jeff Leib, Mark McKenna, and Craig Spinney as stage managers.)	Nominated	
Dorian Awards	2015	TV Current Affairs Show of the Year	Last Week Tonight with John Oliver	Nominated	
Dorian Awards	2016	TV Current Affairs Show of the Year	Last Week Tonight with John Oliver	Won	
Dorian Awards	2017	TV Current Affairs Show of the Year	Last Week Tonight with John Oliver	Nominated	
Dorian Awards	2018	TV Current Affairs Show of the Year	Last Week Tonight with John Oliver	Nominated	
Dorian Awards	2019	TV Current Affairs Show of the Year	Last Week Tonight with John Oliver	Nominated	
Dorian Awards	2020 (1) (Note: In 2020, the Dorian Awards split into two ceremonies: one to honor film and one to honor television. As a result, awards for media in 2019 were recognized in January, and the inaugural television awards ceremony was held in September.)	TV Current Affairs Show of the Year	Last Week Tonight with John Oliver	Nominated	
Dorian Awards	2020 (2)	Best Current Affairs Program	Last Week Tonight with John Oliver	Won	
Dorian Awards	2021	Best Current Affairs Show	Last Week Tonight with John Oliver	Nominated	
Dorian Awards	2022	Best Current Affairs Program	Last Week Tonight with John Oliver	Nominated	
Dorian Awards	2023	Best Current Affairs Program	Last Week Tonight with John Oliver	Nominated	
Dorian Awards	2024	Best Current Affairs Show	Last Week Tonight with John Oliver	Won	
Dorian Awards	2025	Best Current Affairs Show	Last Week Tonight with John Oliver	Won	
Dorian Awards	2026	Best Current Affairs Show	Last Week Tonight with John Oliver	Nominated	
Environmental Media Awards	2015	Reality Television	Last Week Tonight with John Oliver (for "Season 2 Episode 10")	Nominated	
Environmental Media Awards	2017	Television Episodic Comedy	Last Week Tonight with John Oliver (for "Coal")	Won	
Environmental Media Awards	2020	Variety Television	Last Week Tonight with John Oliver (for "Season 6, Episode 101")	Won	
Environmental Media Awards	2024	Variety Television	Last Week Tonight with John Oliver (for "Corn Production")	Won	
GLAAD Media Awards	2015	Outstanding Talk Show Episode	Last Week Tonight with John Oliver (for "Pepe Julian Onziema")	Won	
GLAAD Media Awards	2016	Outstanding Talk Show Episode	Last Week Tonight with John Oliver (for "Transgender Rights")	Nominated	
GLAAD Media Awards	2018	Outstanding Talk Show Episode	Last Week Tonight with John Oliver (for "Australia Marriage Equality")	Won	
GLAAD Media Awards	2019	Outstanding Variety or Talk Show Episode	Last Week Tonight with John Oliver (for "Mike Pence and A Day in the Life of Marlon Bundo")	Nominated	
GLAAD Media Awards	2023	Outstanding Variety or Talk Show Episode	Last Week Tonight with John Oliver (for "Transgender Rights II")	Nominated	
GLAAD Media Awards	2025	Outstanding Variety or Talk Show Episode	Last Week Tonight with John Oliver (for "Libraries")	Nominated	
GLAAD Media Awards	2026	Outstanding Variety or Talk Show Episode	Last Week Tonight with John Oliver (for "Trans Athletes")	Nominated	
Make-Up Artists & Hair Stylists Guild Awards	2025	Best Make-Up – Daytime Television, Game Show or Talk Show	Sarah Egan and Rachel Roberts	Nominated	
MTV Movie & TV Awards	2017	Best Host	John Oliver (for Last Week Tonight with John Oliver)	Nominated	
Peabody Awards	2015	Entertainment	Last Week Tonight with John Oliver (HBO Entertainment in association with Sixteen String Jack Productions and Avalon Television) (Note: Production credits include John Oliver, Tim Carvell, Jon Thoday, and James Taylor as executive producers, Liz Stanton as co-executive producer, Joe Perota as director, Kevin Avery, Tim Carvell, Dan Gurewitch, Geoff Haggerty, Jeff Maurer, John Oliver, Scott Sherman, William Tracy, Jill Twiss, and Juli Weiner as writers, and John Oliver as host.)	Won	
Peabody Awards	2018	Entertainment	Last Week Tonight with John Oliver (HBO Entertainment in association with Sixteen String Jack Productions and Avalon Television) (Note: Production credits include John Oliver, Tim Carvell, and Liz Stanton as executive producers, Paul Pennolino as director, Tim Carvell, Josh Gondelman, Dan Gurewitch, Geoff Haggerty, Jeff Maurer, John Oliver, Scott Sherman, Ben Silva, Will Tracy, Jill Twiss, Seena Vali, and Juli Weiner as writers, and Ryan Barger and Anthony Miale as editors.)	Won	
Peabody Awards	2024	Entertainment	Last Week Tonight with John Oliver (for "Israel-Hamas War"; HBO in association with Peyance Productions and Avalon Television) (Note: Production credits include John Oliver, Tim Carvell, Liz Stanton, Jeremy Tchaban, Catherine Owens, Whit Conway, Kaye Foley, Laura L. Griffin, Christopher McDaniel, Kate Mullaney, Matt Passet, Megan Peck Shub, Wynn Van Dusen, Marian Wang, and Charles Wilson as executive producers, Paul Pennolino as director, Johnathan Appel, Ali Barthwell, Tim Carvell, Liz Hynes, Ryan Ken, Mark Kramer, Sofia Manfredi, Daniel O'Brien, John Oliver, Owen Parsons, Taylor Kay Phillips, Charlie Redd, Joanna Rothkopf, Chrissy Shackelford, and Seena Vali as writers, Anthony Miale and Ryan Barger as editors, and John Oliver as talent.)	Won	
People's Choice Awards	2019	The Nighttime Talk Show of 2019	Last Week Tonight with John Oliver	Nominated	
People's Choice Awards	2020	The Nighttime Talk Show of 2020	Last Week Tonight with John Oliver	Nominated	
People's Choice Awards	2021	The Nighttime Talk Show of 2021	Last Week Tonight with John Oliver	Nominated	
People's Choice Awards	2022	The Nighttime Talk Show of 2022	Last Week Tonight with John Oliver	Nominated	
People's Choice Awards	2024	The Nighttime Talk Show of 2023	Last Week Tonight with John Oliver	Nominated	
Primetime Emmy Awards	2015	Outstanding Variety Talk Series	John Oliver, Tim Carvell, and Liz Stanton	Nominated	
Primetime Emmy Awards	2015	Outstanding Writing for a Variety Series	Kevin Avery, Tim Carvell, Josh Gondelman, Dan Gurewitch, Geoff Haggerty, Jeff Maurer, John Oliver, Scott Sherman, Will Tracy, Jill Twiss, and Juli Weiner	Nominated	
Primetime Emmy Awards	2015	Outstanding Interactive Program	HBO	Won	
Primetime Emmy Awards	2015	Outstanding Picture Editing For Variety Programming	Ryan Barger (for "N.S.A. Edward Snowden (segment)")	Nominated	
Primetime Emmy Awards	2016	Outstanding Variety Talk Series	John Oliver, Tim Carvell, Liz Stanton, and Diane Fitzgerald	Won	
Primetime Emmy Awards	2016	Outstanding Writing for a Variety Series	Kevin Avery, Tim Carvell, Josh Gondelman, Dan Gurewitch, Geoff Haggerty, Jeff Maurer, John Oliver, Scott Sherman, Will Tracy, Jill Twiss, and Juli Weiner	Won	
Primetime Emmy Awards	2016	Outstanding Directing for a Variety Series	Paul Pennolino (for "Episode 303")	Nominated	
Primetime Emmy Awards	2016	Outstanding Picture Editing For Variety Programming	Anthony Miale (for "Public Defenders (segment)")	Won	
Primetime Emmy Awards	2016	Outstanding Sound Mixing for a Variety Series or Special	Charlie Jones, Steve Lettie, Tony Rollins, and Steve Watson (for "Episode 225")	Nominated	
Primetime Emmy Awards	2016	Outstanding Technical Direction, Camerawork, Video Control for a Series	Paul Cangialosi, Nick Fayo, John Harrison, Ray Hoover, Dante Pagano, Dave Saretsky, and Augie Yuson (for "Episode 303")	Nominated	
Primetime Emmy Awards	2017	Outstanding Variety Talk Series	John Oliver, Tim Carvell, and Liz Stanton	Won	
Primetime Emmy Awards	2017	Outstanding Writing for a Variety Series	Kevin Avery, Tim Carvell, Josh Gondelman, Dan Gurewitch, Geoff Haggerty, Jeff Maurer, John Oliver, Scott Sherman, Will Tracy, Jill Twiss, and Juli Weiner	Won	
Primetime Emmy Awards	2017	Outstanding Directing for a Variety Series	Paul Pennolino (for "Multi-Level Marketing)	Nominated	
Primetime Emmy Awards	2017	Outstanding Interactive Program	Partially Important Productions	Won	
Primetime Emmy Awards	2017	Outstanding Picture Editing For Variety Programming	Anthony Miale (for "F*ck 2016 (segment)")	Won	
Primetime Emmy Awards	2017	Outstanding Picture Editing For Variety Programming	Ryan Barger (for "Stoplight (segment)")	Nominated	
Primetime Emmy Awards	2017	Outstanding Sound Mixing for a Variety Series or Special	Jonathan Herrera, Charlie Jones, Steve Lettie, and Steve Watson (for "Sub-Prime Auto Loans")	Nominated	
Primetime Emmy Awards	2017	Outstanding Technical Direction, Camerawork, Video Control for a Series	Rob Balton, Jerry Cancel, John Harrison, Jeff Latonero, Dante Pagano, Dave Saretsky, and Augie Yuson (for "Gerrymandering")	Nominated	
Primetime Emmy Awards	2018	Outstanding Variety Talk Series	John Oliver, Tim Carvell, and Liz Stanton	Won	
Primetime Emmy Awards	2018	Outstanding Writing for a Variety Series	Tim Carvell, Raquel D'Apice, Josh Gondelman, Dan Gurewitch, Geoff Haggerty, Jeff Maurer, John Oliver, Brian Parise, Scott Sherman, Ben Silva, Will Tracy, Jill Twiss, Seena Vali, and Juli Weiner	Won	
Primetime Emmy Awards	2018	Outstanding Directing for a Variety Series	Paul Pennolino (for "Episode 421")	Nominated	
Primetime Emmy Awards	2018	Outstanding Interactive Program	Partially Important Productions	Won	
Primetime Emmy Awards	2018	Outstanding Picture Editing For Variety Programming	Ryan Barger (for "Border Patrol (segment)")	Won	
Primetime Emmy Awards	2018	Outstanding Picture Editing For Variety Programming	Anthony Miale (for "Wax President Harding (segment)")	Nominated	
Primetime Emmy Awards	2018	Outstanding Production Design for a Variety, Reality or Reality-Competition Series	Eric Morrell (for "Episode 418")	Nominated	
Primetime Emmy Awards	2018	Outstanding Sound Mixing for a Variety Series or Special	Jason Dyer Sainsbury, Charlie Jones, Steve Lettie, Anthony Lalumia, Max Perez, Patrick Smith, and Steve Watson (for "Episode 421")	Nominated	
Primetime Emmy Awards	2018	Outstanding Technical Direction, Camerawork, Video Control for a Series	Jerry Cancel, Paul Cangialosi, Joe DeBonis, John Harrison, Jake Hoover, Dante Pagano, Dave Saretsky, and Augie Yuson (for "Episode 421")	Nominated	
Primetime Emmy Awards	2019	Outstanding Variety Talk Series	John Oliver, Tim Carvell, Liz Stanton, and Jeremy Tchaban	Won	
Primetime Emmy Awards	2019	Outstanding Writing for a Variety Series	Tim Carvell, Raquel D'Apice, Josh Gondelman, Dan Gurewitch, Jeff Maurer, Daniel O'Brien, John Oliver, Owen Parsons, Charlie Redd, Joanna Rothkopf, Ben Silva, Jill Twiss, Seena Vali, and Juli Weiner	Won	
Primetime Emmy Awards	2019	Outstanding Directing for a Variety Series	Paul Pennolino (for "Psychics")	Nominated	
Primetime Emmy Awards	2019	Outstanding Interactive Program	Partially Important Productions	Nominated	
Primetime Emmy Awards	2019	Outstanding Picture Editing For Variety Programming	Anthony Miale (for "The Journey Of ChiiJohn (segment)")	Nominated	
Primetime Emmy Awards	2019	Outstanding Picture Editing For Variety Programming	Ryan Barger (for "The Wax & The Furious (segment)")	Won	
Primetime Emmy Awards	2019	Outstanding Production Design for a Variety, Reality or Competition Series	Eric Morrell and Ipek Celik (for "Authoritarianism")	Nominated	
Primetime Emmy Awards	2019	Outstanding Sound Mixing for a Variety Series or Special	Charlie Jones, Steve Lettie, Max Perez, and Steve Watson (for "Authoritarianism")	Nominated	
Primetime Emmy Awards	2019	Outstanding Technical Direction, Camerawork, Video Control for a Series	John Harrison, Jake Hoover, Dante Pagano, Phil Salanto, Dave Saretsky, and Augie Yuson (for "Psychics")	Won	
Primetime Emmy Awards	2020	Outstanding Variety Talk Series	John Oliver, Tim Carvell, Liz Stanton, Jeremy Tchaban, Christopher Werner, Laura L. Griffin, Kate Mullaney, Matt Passet, Marian Wang, and Charles Wilson	Won	
Primetime Emmy Awards	2020	Outstanding Writing for a Variety Series	Tim Carvell, Dan Gurewitch, Jeff Maurer, Daniel O'Brien, John Oliver, Owen Parsons, Charlie Redd, Joanna Rothkopf, Ben Silva, Jill Twiss, Seena Vali, and Juli Weiner	Won	
Primetime Emmy Awards	2020	Outstanding Directing for a Variety Series	Paul Pennolino and Christopher Werner (for "Episode 629")	Nominated	
Primetime Emmy Awards	2020	Outstanding Original Music and Lyrics	David Dabbon, Joanna Rothkopf, Jill Twiss, and Seena Vali (for "Episode 629 / Song Title: Eat Sh!t, Bob")	Nominated	
Primetime Emmy Awards	2020	Outstanding Picture Editing For Variety Programming	Anthony Miale (for "The Journey Of ChiiJohn: Chapter 2 (segment)")	Nominated	
Primetime Emmy Awards	2020	Outstanding Picture Editing For Variety Programming	Ryan Barger (for "Eat Sh!t, Bob! (segment)")	Won	
Primetime Emmy Awards	2020	Outstanding Production Design for a Variety, Reality or Competition Series	Eric Morrell and Amanda Carzoli (for "Episode 629")	Nominated	
Primetime Emmy Awards	2020	Outstanding Sound Mixing for a Variety Series or Special	Charlie Jones, John Kilgore, Steve Lettie, Tony Rollins, Jayson Dyer Sainsbury, Paul Special, Dave Swanson, and Steve Watson (for "Episode 629")	Nominated	
Primetime Emmy Awards	2020	Outstanding Technical Direction, Camerawork, Video Control for a Series	Rob Bolton, Scotty Buckler, Joe Debonis, Rich Freedman, John Harrison, Michael Hauer, Lucan Owen, Dante Pagano, Tim Quigley, Phil Salanto, Dave Saretsky, Russell Swanson, and Augie Yuson (for "Episode 629")	Won	
Primetime Emmy Awards	2021	Outstanding Variety Talk Series	John Oliver, Tim Carvell, Liz Stanton, Jeremy Tchaban, Christopher Werner, Laura L. Griffin, Kate Mullaney, Catherine Owens, Matt Passet, Marian Wang, and Charles Wilson	Won	
Primetime Emmy Awards	2021	Outstanding Writing for a Variety Series	Johnathan Appel, Ali Barthwell, Tim Carvell, Liz Hynes, Greg Iwinski, Mark Kramer, Daniel O'Brien, John Oliver, Owen Parsons, Charlie Redd, Joanna Rothkopf, Chrissy Shackelford, Ben Silva, and Seena Vali	Won	
Primetime Emmy Awards	2021	Outstanding Directing for a Variety Series	Christopher Werner (for "Trump & Election Results / F*ck 2020")	Nominated	
Primetime Emmy Awards	2021	Outstanding Picture Editing For Variety Programming	Ryan Barger and Anthony Miale (for "Trump & Election Results / F*ck 2020")	Nominated	
Primetime Emmy Awards	2021	Outstanding Production Design for a Variety, Reality or Competition Series	Eric Morrell and Veronica Spink (for "Trump & Election Results / F*ck 2020")	Nominated	
Primetime Emmy Awards	2021	Outstanding Sound Mixing for a Variety Series or Special	Siara Spreen and Eleanor Osborne (for "Trump & Election Results / F*ck 2020")	Nominated	
Primetime Emmy Awards	2021	Outstanding Technical Direction, Camerawork, Video Control for a Series	Scott Buckler, Michael Carmine, Matthew Fleischmann, Jon Graham, Michael Isler, Dexter Kennedy, John Schwartz, Grgo Sevo, Russell Swanson, and Maxwell Tubman (for "Trump & Election Results / F*ck 2020")	Won	
Primetime Emmy Awards	2022	Outstanding Variety Talk Series	John Oliver, Tim Carvell, Liz Stanton, Jeremy Tchaban, Catherine Owens, Christopher Werner, Laura L. Griffin, Kate Mullaney, Matt Passet, Marian Wang, and Charles Wilson	Won	
Primetime Emmy Awards	2022	Outstanding Writing for a Variety Series	Johnathan Appel, Ali Barthwell, Tim Carvell, Liz Hynes, Greg Iwinski, Ryan Ken, Mark Kramer, Sofía Manfredi, Daniel O'Brien, John Oliver, Owen Parsons, Taylor Kay Phillips, Charlie Redd, Joanna Rothkopf, Chrissy Shackelford, and Seena Vali	Won	
Primetime Emmy Awards	2022	Outstanding Directing for a Variety Series	Paul Pennolino and Christopher Werner (for "Union Busting")	Nominated	
Primetime Emmy Awards	2022	Outstanding Picture Editing For Variety Programming	Anthony Miale (for "The Confesstigators (segment)")	Nominated	
Primetime Emmy Awards	2022	Outstanding Technical Direction, Camerawork, Video Control for a Series	Elizabeth Cavanagh, Rich Freedman, John Harrison, Wyatt Maker, Dante Pagano, Dave Saretsky, John Schwartz, Ken Thompson, Yayo Vang and Augie Yuson (for "Union Busting")	Won	
Primetime Emmy Awards	2024 (1) (Note: Due to the 2023 Hollywood labor disputes, the 75th Primetime Emmy Awards ceremony, originally scheduled for September 18, 2023, was delayed, resulting in two ceremonies being held in 2024. The delayed 75th Primetime Emmy Awards ceremony was held on January 15, 2024, and the 76th Primetime Emmy Awards ceremony will be held on September 15, 2024.)	Outstanding Scripted Variety Series	John Oliver, Tim Carvell, Liz Stanton, Jeremy Tchaban, Catherine Owens, Whit Conway, Kaye Foley, Laura L. Griffin, Christopher McDaniel, Kate Mullaney, Matt Passet, Megan Peck Shub, Wynn Van Dusen, Marian Wang, Charles Wilson, and Nicole Franza	Won	
Primetime Emmy Awards	2024 (1)	Outstanding Writing for a Variety Series	Johnathan Appel, Ali Barthwell, Tim Carvell, Liz Hynes, Ryan Ken, Mark Kramer, Sofia Manfredi, Daniel O'Brien, John Oliver, Owen Parsons, Taylor Kay Phillips, Charlie Redd, Joanna Rothkopf, Chrissy Shackelford, and Seena Vali	Won	
Primetime Emmy Awards	2024 (1)	Outstanding Directing for a Variety Series	Paul Pennolino (for "Afghanistan")	Nominated	
Primetime Emmy Awards	2024 (1)	Outstanding Production Design for a Variety Or Reality Series	Eric Morrell and Sabrina Lederer (for "Museums")	Nominated	
Primetime Emmy Awards	2024 (2)	Outstanding Scripted Variety Series	John Oliver, Tim Carvell, Liz Stanton, Jeremy Tchaban, Catherine Owens, Whit Conway, Kaye Foley, Laura L. Griffin, Christopher McDaniel, Kate Mullaney, Matt Passet, Megan Peck Shub, Wynn Van Dusen, Marian Wang, Charles Wilson, Rebecca Etchberger, and Nicole Franza	Won	
Primetime Emmy Awards	2024 (2)	Outstanding Writing for a Variety Series	Johnathan Appel, Ali Barthwell, Tim Carvell, Liz Hynes, Ryan Ken, Mark Kramer, Sofia Manfredi, Daniel O'Brien, John Oliver, Owen Parsons, Taylor Kay Phillips, Charlie Redd, Joanna Rothkopf, Chrissy Shackelford, and Seena Vali	Won	
Primetime Emmy Awards	2024 (2)	Outstanding Picture Editing For Variety Programming (Segment)	Anthony Miale (for "Boeing (segment)")	Nominated	
Primetime Emmy Awards	2024 (2)	Outstanding Picture Editing For Variety Programming (Segment)	Ryan Barger (for "The Sad Tale Of Henry The Engine (segment)")	Nominated	
Primetime Emmy Awards	2024 (2)	Outstanding Production Design for a Variety Or Reality Series	Eric Morrell and Amanda Carzoli (for "Freight Trains")	Nominated	
Primetime Emmy Awards	2024 (2)	Outstanding Technical Direction and Camerawork for a Series	Dave Saretsky, Jerry Canćel, Franco Coello, Dante Pagano, Mark Britt, and Joe DeBonis (for "Elon Musk")	Nominated	
Primetime Emmy Awards	2025	Outstanding Scripted Variety Series	John Oliver, Tim Carvell, Liz Stanton, Jeremy Tchaban, Catherine Owens, Rebecca Etchberger, Laura L. Griffin, Kaye Foley, Christopher McDaniel, Kate Mullaney, Matt Passet, Marian Wang, Charles Wilson, Wynn Van Dusen, and Nicole Franza	Won	
Primetime Emmy Awards	2025	Outstanding Writing for a Variety Series	Johnathan Appel, Ali Barthwell, Tim Carvell, Liz Hynes, Ryan Ken, Sofia Manfredi, Daniel O'Brien, John Oliver, Owen Parsons, Taylor Kay Phillips, Charlie Redd, Joanna Rothkopf, Chrissy Shackelford, and Seena Vali	Won	
Primetime Emmy Awards	2025	Outstanding Directing for a Variety Series	Paul Pennolino (for "India Elections")	Nominated	
Primetime Emmy Awards	2025	Outstanding Picture Editing for Variety Programming (Segment)	Anthony Miale (for "Facebook Content Moderation (segment)")	Nominated	
Primetime Emmy Awards	2025	Outstanding Picture Editing for Variety Programming (Segment)	Ryan Barger (for "That Stuff's American (segment)")	Nominated	
Primetime Emmy Awards	2025	Outstanding Production Design for a Variety Or Reality Series	Eric Morrell, Hugh Zeigler, and Amanda Carzoli (for "Mass Deportations")	Nominated	
Primetime Emmy Awards	2026	Outstanding Variety Series	John Oliver, Tim Carvell, Liz Stanton, Jeremy Tchaban, Catherine Owens, Nicole Franza, Rebecca Etchberger, Kaye Foley, Laura L. Griffin, Anita Hassan, Farrah Lopez, Christopher McDaniel, Kate Mullaney, Matt Passet, Meghan Rhoad, Wynn Van Dusen, Marian Wang, and Charles Wilson	Nominated	
Primetime Emmy Awards	2026	Outstanding Writing for a Variety Series	Johnathan Appel, Ali Barthwell, Tim Carvell, Liz Hynes, Ryan Ken, Sofia Manfredi, Daniel O'Brien, John Oliver, Owen Parsons, Taylor Kay Phillips, Charlie Redd, Joanna Rothkopf, Chrissy Shackelford, and Seena Vali	Nominated	
Primetime Emmy Awards	2026	Outstanding Picture Editing for Variety Programming (Segment)	Ryan Barger (for "Moon Mammoths Game Documentary")	Nominated	
Producers Guild of America Awards	2015	Outstanding Producer of Live Entertainment & Talk Television	John Oliver, Tim Carvell, and Liz Stanton	Nominated	
Producers Guild of America Awards	2016	Outstanding Producer of Live Entertainment & Talk Television	John Oliver, Tim Carvell, and Liz Stanton	Won	
Producers Guild of America Awards	2017	Outstanding Producer of Live Entertainment & Talk Television	John Oliver, Tim Carvell, and Liz Stanton	Won	
Producers Guild of America Awards	2018	Outstanding Producer of Live Entertainment & Talk Television	John Oliver, Tim Carvell, and Liz Stanton	Won	
Producers Guild of America Awards	2019	Outstanding Producer of Live Entertainment & Talk Television	John Oliver, Tim Carvell, Liz Stanton, and Jeremy Tchaban	Won	
Producers Guild of America Awards	2020	Outstanding Producer of Live Entertainment & Talk Television	John Oliver, Tim Carvell, Liz Stanton, Jeremy Tchaban, Chris Werner, Laura Griffin, Kate Mullaney, Matt Passet, Marian Wang, and Charles Wilson	Won	
Producers Guild of America Awards	2021	Outstanding Producer of Live Entertainment & Talk Television	John Oliver, Tim Carvell, Liz Stanton, Jeremy Tchaban, Christopher Werner, Laura L. Griffin, Kate Mullaney, Matt Passet, Marian Wang, and Charles Wilson	Won	
Producers Guild of America Awards	2022	Outstanding Producer of Live Entertainment, Variety, Sketch, Standup & Talk Television	John Oliver, Tim Carvell, Liz Stanton, Jeremy Tchaban, Christopher Werner, Laura L. Griffin, Kate Mullaney, Catherine Owens, Matt Passet, Marian Wang, and Charles Wilson	Won	
Producers Guild of America Awards	2023	Outstanding Producer of Live Entertainment, Variety, Sketch, Standup & Talk Television	John Oliver, Tim Carvell, Liz Stanton, Jon Thoday, James Taylor, Jeremy Tchaban, Catherine Owens, Whit Conway, Kaye Foley, Laura L. Griffin, Christopher McDaniel, Kate Mullaney, Matt Passet, Megan Peck Shub, Wynn Van Dusen, Marian Wang, and Charles Wilson	Won	
Producers Guild of America Awards	2024	Outstanding Producer of Live Entertainment, Variety, Sketch, Standup & Talk Television	John Oliver, Tim Carvell, Liz Stanton, Jeremy Tchaban, Catherine Owens, Whit Conway, Kaye Foley, Laura L. Griffin, Christopher McDaniel, Kate Mullaney, Matt Passet, Megan Peck Shub, Wynn Van Dusen, Marian Wang, and Charles Wilson	Won	
Producers Guild of America Awards	2025	Outstanding Producer of Live Entertainment, Variety, Sketch, Standup & Talk Television	John Oliver, Tim Carvell, Liz Stanton, Jeremy Tchaban, Catherine Owens, Whit Conway, Kaye Foley, Laura L. Griffin, Christopher McDaniel, Kate Mullaney, Matt Passet, Megan Peck Shub, Wynn Van Dusen, Marian Wang, Charles Wilson, and Rebecca Etchberger	Nominated	
Producers Guild of America Awards	2026	Outstanding Producer of Live Entertainment, Variety, Sketch, Standup & Talk Television	Last Week Tonight with John Oliver	Nominated	
Television Academy Honors Award	2017	—N/a	Last Week Tonight with John Oliver	Won	
Television Critics Association Awards	2015	Outstanding Achievement in News and Information	Last Week Tonight with John Oliver	Won	
Television Critics Association Awards	2016	Outstanding Achievement in News and Information	Last Week Tonight with John Oliver	Nominated	
Television Critics Association Awards	2017	Outstanding Achievement in News and Information	Last Week Tonight with John Oliver	Nominated	
Television Critics Association Awards	2018	Outstanding Achievement in Sketch/Variety Shows	Last Week Tonight with John Oliver	Won	
Television Critics Association Awards	2019	Outstanding Achievement in Sketch/Variety Shows	Last Week Tonight with John Oliver	Won	
Television Critics Association Awards	2020	Outstanding Achievement in Sketch/Variety Shows	Last Week Tonight with John Oliver	Nominated	
Television Critics Association Awards	2021	Outstanding Achievement in Variety, Talk or Sketch	Last Week Tonight with John Oliver	Won	
Television Critics Association Awards	2022	Outstanding Achievement in Variety, Talk or Sketch	Last Week Tonight with John Oliver	Nominated	
Television Critics Association Awards	2023	Outstanding Achievement in Variety, Talk or Sketch	Last Week Tonight with John Oliver	Nominated	
Television Critics Association Awards	2024	Outstanding Achievement in Variety, Talk or Sketch	Last Week Tonight with John Oliver	Nominated	
Television Critics Association Awards	2025	Outstanding Achievement in Variety, Talk or Sketch	Last Week Tonight with John Oliver	Nominated	
Television Critics Association Awards	2026	Outstanding Achievement in Variety, Talk or Sketch	Last Week Tonight with John Oliver	Nominated	
Webby Awards	2015	Best Writing in Social	Last Week Tonight with John Oliver	Won	
Webby Awards	2016	Best Writing in Social	Last Week Tonight with John Oliver	Won	
Webby Awards	2016	Humor (Websites)	Leap second Countdown Clock	Nominated	
Webby Awards	2017	Best Writing (Video)	Last Week Tonight with John Oliver	Nominated	
Writers Guild of America Awards	2015	Comedy/Variety (Including Talk) – Series	Kevin Avery, Tim Carvell, Dan Gurewitch, Geoff Haggerty, Jeff Maurer, John Oliver, Scott Sherman, Will Tracy, Jill Twiss, and Juli Weiner	Won	
Writers Guild of America Awards	2017	Comedy/Variety (Including Talk) – Series	Kevin Avery, Tim Carvell, Josh Gondelman, Dan Gurewitch, Geoff Haggerty, Jeff Maurer, John Oliver, Scott Sherman, Will Tracy, Jill Twiss, and Juli Weiner	Won	
Writers Guild of America Awards	2018	Comedy/Variety Talk Series	Tim Carvell, Josh Gondelman, Dan Gurewitch, Geoff Haggerty, Jeff Maurer, John Oliver, Scott Sherman, Ben Silva, Will Tracy, Jill Twiss, Seena Vali, and Juli Weiner	Won	
Writers Guild of America Awards	2019	Comedy/Variety Talk Series	Tim Carvell, Raquel D'Apice, Josh Gondelman, Dan Gurewitch, Jeff Maurer, Daniel O'Brien, John Oliver, Brian Parise, Owen Parsons, Ben Silva, Will Tracy, Jill Twiss, Seena Vali, and Juli Weiner	Won	
Writers Guild of America Awards	2020	Comedy/Variety Talk Series	Tim Carvell, Dan Gurewitch, Jeff Maurer, Daniel O'Brien, John Oliver, Owen Parsons, Charlie Redd, Joanna Rothkopf, Ben Silva, Jill Twiss, Seena Vali, and Juli Weiner	Won	
Writers Guild of America Awards	2021	Comedy/Variety Talk Series	Johnathan Appel, Ali Barthwell, Tim Carvell, Liz Hynes, Greg Iwinski, Mark Kramer, Daniel O'Brien, John Oliver, Owen Parsons, Charlie Redd, Joanna Rothkopf, Chrissy Shackelford, Ben Silva, and Seena Vali	Nominated	
Writers Guild of America Awards	2022	Comedy/Variety Talk Series	Johnathan Appel, Ali Barthwell, Tim Carvell, Liz Hynes, Greg Iwinski, Mark Kramer, Daniel O'Brien, John Oliver, Owen Parsons, Charlie Redd, Joanna Rothkopf, Chrissy Shackelford, Ben Silva, and Seena Vali	Nominated	
Writers Guild of America Awards	2023	Comedy/Variety Talk Series	Johnathan Appel, Ali Barthwell, Tim Carvell, Liz Hynes, Ryan Ken, Mark Kramer, Sofia Manfredi, Daniel O'Brien, John Oliver, Owen Parsons, Taylor Kay Phillips, Charlie Redd, Joanna Rothkopf, Chrissy Shackelford, and Seena Vali	Won	
Writers Guild of America Awards	2024	Comedy/Variety Talk Series	Johnathan Appel, Ali Barthwell, Tim Carvell, Liz Hynes, Ryan Ken, Mark Kramer, Sofia Manfredi, Daniel O'Brien, John Oliver, Owen Parsons, Taylor Kay Phillips, Charlie Redd, Joanna Rothkopf, Chrissy Shackelford, and Seena Vali	Won	
Writers Guild of America Awards	2025	Comedy/Variety Series – Talk or Sketch	Johnathan Appel, Ali Barthwell, Tim Carvell, Liz Hynes, Ryan Ken, Mark Kramer, Sofia Manfredi, Daniel O'Brien, John Oliver, Owen Parsons, Taylor Kay Phillips, Charlie Redd, Joanna Rothkopf, Chrissy Shackelford, and Seena Vali	Won	
Writers Guild of America Awards	2026	Comedy/Variety Series – Talk or Sketch	Johnathan Appel, Ali Barthwell, Tim Carvell, Liz Hynes, Ryan Ken, Sofia Manfredi, Daniel O'Brien, John Oliver, Owen Parsons, Taylor Kay Phillips, Charlie Redd, Joanna Rothkopf, Chrissy Shackelford, and Seena Vali	Won	
