= Charlie Redd (writer) =

American television writer

- Education: New York University Tisch School of the Arts (2014)
- Occupation: Screenwriter
- Writing career
- Language: English
- Notable work: Last Week Tonight with John Oliver
- Notable awards: Primetime Emmy Award (2019, 2020, 2021, 2022, 2024), Writers Guild of America Award (2020, 2023, 2024)

Charlie Redd is an American television writer. He is best known for his work as a senior writer on HBO's Last Week Tonight with John Oliver.

== Education ==
Redd graduated from New York University Tisch School of the Arts in 2014.

== Awards and nominations ==
Award	Year (Note: The listed year refers to the date of the ceremony.)	Category	Nominee(s)	Result	Ref(s)
Primetime Emmy Awards	2019	Outstanding Writing for a Variety Series	Tim Carvell, Raquel D'Apice, Josh Gondelman, Dan Gurewitch, Jeff Maurer, Daniel O'Brien, John Oliver, Owen Parsons, Charlie Redd, Joanna Rothkopf, Ben Silva, Jill Twiss, Seena Vali, and Juli Weiner	Won	
Primetime Emmy Awards	2020	Outstanding Writing for a Variety Series	Tim Carvell, Dan Gurewitch, Jeff Maurer, Daniel O'Brien, John Oliver, Owen Parsons, Charlie Redd, Joanna Rothkopf, Ben Silva, Jill Twiss, Seena Vali, and Juli Weiner	Won	
Primetime Emmy Awards	2021	Outstanding Writing for a Variety Series	Johnathan Appel, Ali Barthwell, Tim Carvell, Liz Hynes, Greg Iwinski, Mark Kramer, Daniel O'Brien, John Oliver, Owen Parsons, Charlie Redd, Joanna Rothkopf, Chrissy Shackelford, Ben Silva, and Seena Vali	Won	
Primetime Emmy Awards	2022	Outstanding Writing for a Variety Series	Johnathan Appel, Ali Barthwell, Tim Carvell, Liz Hynes, Greg Iwinski, Ryan Ken, Mark Kramer, Sofía Manfredi, Daniel O'Brien, John Oliver, Owen Parsons, Taylor Kay Phillips, Charlie Redd, Joanna Rothkopf, Chrissy Shackelford, and Seena Vali	Won	
Primetime Emmy Awards	2024 (1) (Note: Due to the 2023 Hollywood labor disputes, the 75th Primetime Emmy Awards ceremony, originally scheduled for September 18, 2023, was delayed, resulting in two ceremonies being held in 2024. The delayed 75th Primetime Emmy Awards ceremony was held on January 15, 2024, and the 76th Primetime Emmy Awards ceremony will be held on September 15, 2024.)	Outstanding Writing for a Variety Series	Johnathan Appel, Ali Barthwell, Tim Carvell, Liz Hynes, Ryan Ken, Mark Kramer, Sofia Manfredi, Daniel O'Brien, John Oliver, Owen Parsons, Taylor Kay Phillips, Charlie Redd, Joanna Rothkopf, Chrissy Shackelford, and Seena Vali	Won	
Primetime Emmy Awards	2024 (2)	Outstanding Writing for a Variety Series	Johnathan Appel, Ali Barthwell, Tim Carvell, Liz Hynes, Ryan Ken, Mark Kramer, Sofia Manfredi, Daniel O'Brien, John Oliver, Owen Parsons, Taylor Kay Phillips, Charlie Redd, Joanna Rothkopf, Chrissy Shackelford, and Seena Vali	Won	
Writers Guild of America Awards	2020	Comedy/Variety – Talk Series	Tim Carvell, Dan Gurewitch, Jeff Maurer, Daniel O'Brien, John Oliver, Owen Parsons, Charlie Redd, Joanna Rothkopf, Ben Silva, Jill Twiss, Seena Vali, and Juli Weiner	Won	
Writers Guild of America Awards	2021	Comedy/Variety – Talk Series	Johnathan Appel, Ali Barthwell, Tim Carvell, Liz Hynes, Greg Iwinski, Mark Kramer, Daniel O'Brien, John Oliver, Owen Parsons, Charlie Redd, Joanna Rothkopf, Chrissy Shackelford, Ben Silva, and Seena Vali	Nominated	
Writers Guild of America Awards	2022	Comedy/Variety – Talk Series	Johnathan Appel, Ali Barthwell, Tim Carvell, Liz Hynes, Greg Iwinski, Mark Kramer, Daniel O'Brien, John Oliver, Owen Parsons, Charlie Redd, Joanna Rothkopf, Chrissy Shackelford, Ben Silva, and Seena Vali	Nominated	
Writers Guild of America Awards	2023	Comedy/Variety – Talk Series	Johnathan Appel, Ali Barthwell, Tim Carvell, Liz Hynes, Ryan Ken, Mark Kramer, Sofia Manfredi, Daniel O'Brien, John Oliver, Owen Parsons, Taylor Kay Phillips, Charlie Redd, Joanna Rothkopf, Chrissy Shackelford, and Seena Vali	Won	
Writers Guild of America Awards	2024	Comedy/Variety – Talk Series	Johnathan Appel, Ali Barthwell, Tim Carvell, Liz Hynes, Ryan Ken, Mark Kramer, Sofia Manfredi, Daniel O'Brien, John Oliver, Owen Parsons, Taylor Kay Phillips, Charlie Redd, Joanna Rothkopf, Chrissy Shackelford, and Seena Vali	Won	
