= Rob Sheffield =

American music journalist (born 1966)

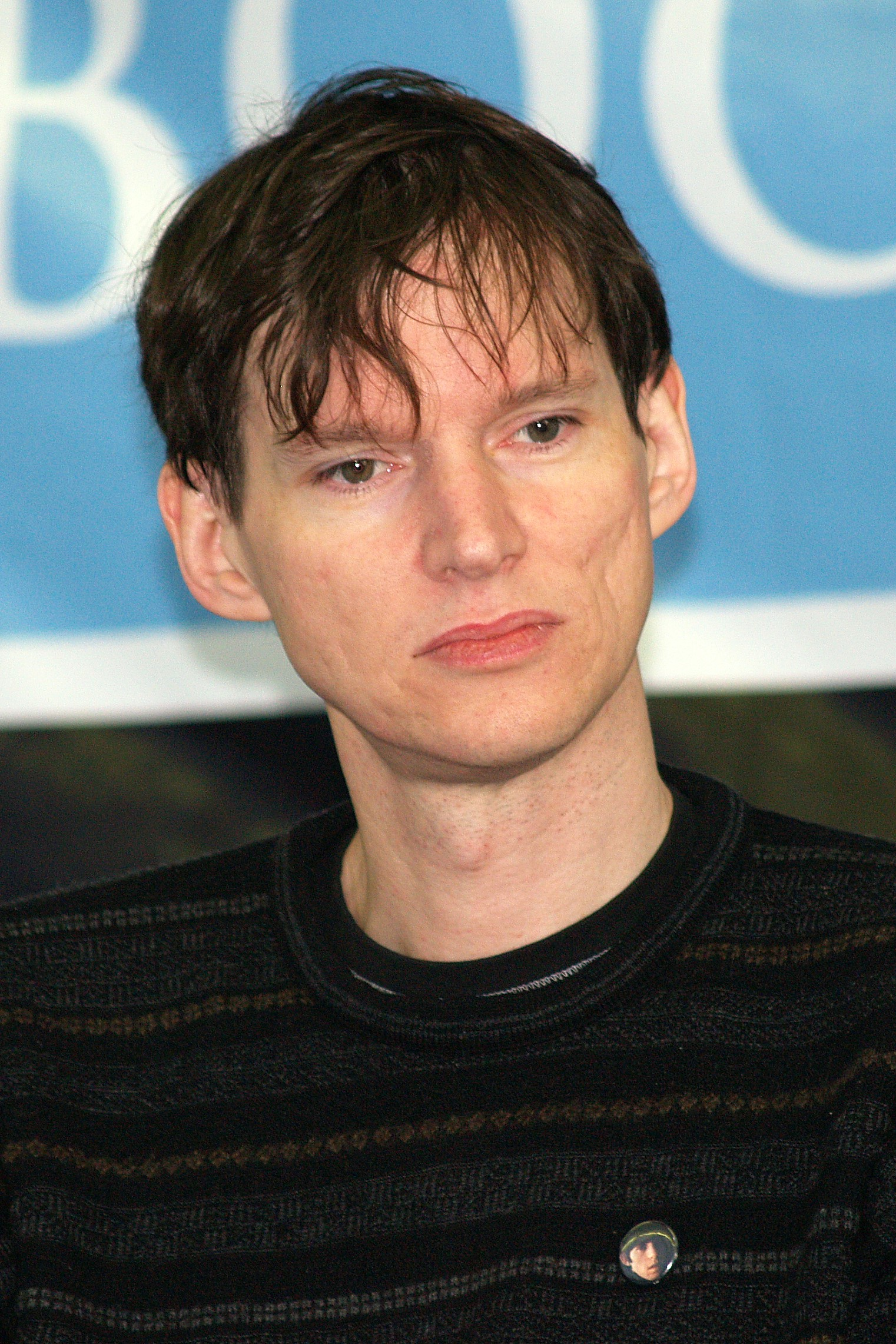
- Sheffield at the 2007 Brooklyn Book Festival
- Born: Robert James Sheffield; February 2, 1966 (age 60); Milton, Massachusetts, U.S.
- Occupations: Author; columnist
- Spouses: Renee Crist (m. 1991; died 1997) Ally Polak (m. 2006)
- Writing career
- Genres: Music pop culture

Robert James Sheffield (born February 2, 1966) is an American music journalist and author.

Sheffield is a long-time contributing editor at Rolling Stone, writing about music, TV, and pop culture. Previously, he was a contributing editor at Blender, Spin and Details magazines.

== Early life ==
A native of Milton, Massachusetts, Sheffield has a bachelor's degree from Yale University and master's degree (1991) from the University of Virginia.

== Published works ==
Sheffield has written eight books. His first, a memoir published by Random House in January 2007, is titled Love Is a Mix Tape: Life and Loss, One Song at a Time. An excerpt of the book was featured in the January 2007 issue of GQ. A national bestseller, the book was met with much acclaim.

Sheffield's sixth book, released in April 2017, is called Dreaming the Beatles: The Love Story of One Band and the Whole World. An excerpt was published online by Rolling Stone. USA Today gave Dreaming the Beatles three and one-half (out of four) stars and called it a "charming new collection of essays." Spin added that "Dreaming the Beatles is equal parts history and cultural criticism, as Sheffield draws from dozens of sources to lay down the story of how the Beatles came to be, before writing about why any of it matters." MTV opined that "Dreaming the Beatles is one of the best books about the band ever written." Sheffield won the ASCAP Foundation's Virgil Thomson Award for Outstanding Music Criticism for Dreaming the Beatles in 2017.

Sheffield's latest book, published in November 2024, about singer Taylor Swift, is entitled Heartbreak Is the National Anthem: How Taylor Swift Reinvented Pop Music. Writing in The New York Times, Amanda Hess praises his encyclopedic knowledge of Swift's music, fans, and business acumen, but especially her talent as a songwriter, saying "everything always leads back to her virtuosic writing". Publishers Weekly says "the unrestrained delight with which Sheffield captures his subject, [mixes] a fan’s exuberance with a music critic’s nuanced analysis." Kirkus Reviews similarly calls it "an affectionate homage from an ardent fan".

== Personal life ==
Sheffield lives in Brooklyn, New York, with his wife.

== Bibliography ==
- 2007 – Love Is a Mix Tape: Life and Loss, One Song at a Time. ISBN 9781400083039
- 2009 – Bande Originale (French Edition). ISBN 2355840202
- 2010 – Talking to Girls About Duran Duran: One Young Man's Quest for True Love and a Cooler Haircut. ISBN 0452297230
- 2013 – Turn Around Bright Eyes: The Rituals of Love and Karaoke. ISBN 0062207628
- 2016 – On Bowie. ISBN 0062562703
- 2017 – Dreaming the Beatles: The Love Story of One Band and the Whole World. ISBN 0062207652
- 2019 – The Wild Heart of Stevie Nicks (Audible book). ASIN B07PRK66HL
- 2024 – Heartbreak Is the National Anthem: How Taylor Swift Reinvented Pop Music. ISBN 0063351315
