= Bwog =

US student website

- Type: Student-run news website for the Columbia University community
- Editor-in-chief: Eve Bertrand
- Managing editor: Sam Mezrich
- Campus editor: Manaia Taula-Lieras
- City: New York City
- Readership: 400,000 unique visitors/month
- Website: bwog.com

Bwog is an independent, student-run news website geared toward members of the Columbia University community. The website provides news, features, and commentary on issues affecting Barnard, Columbia, and Morningside Heights, Manhattan.

== Organization ==
The staff of Bwog—which consists of about 90 students each semester—is composed exclusively of current Columbia and Barnard students.

The website was originally launched in January 2006 as the online incarnation of The Blue and White, with the intention of posting stories that warranted immediate attention, such as breaking news and free food alerts. Since its founding, Bwog has grown into its own as a separate entity from The Blue and White, though they maintain amicable ties.

Bwog serves as a friendlier, more satiric counterpoint to the school's newspaper, the Columbia Daily Spectator. It has been described as the Gawker of Columbia media.

Bwog has published over 16,000 articles, received a nomination for the U.S. News & World Report Best Alternative Media Outlet of 2008 contest, and has been cited in The New York Times, The Wall Street Journal, The Washington Post, The Huffington Post, Vice News, and Slate.

Bwog is published by Bwog Publishing Incorporated. It was formerly published by Blue and White Publishing Inc., an independent corporation founded in March 2013.

== Alumni ==
- Anna Bahr, communications director for Bernie Sanders 2020 presidential campaign, former speechwriter for Los Angeles mayor Eric Garcetti and reporter at The New York Times
- Anna Phillips, reporter at Los Angeles Times
- Eliza Shapiro, reporter at The New York Times, formerly of Politico and The Daily Beast
- Conor Skelding, reporter at Politico
- Peter Sterne, reporter at Freedom of the Press, editor at U.S. Press Freedom Tracker, formerly of Politico
- Alexandra Svokos, senior editor ABC News, formerly of The Huffington Post and Elite Daily
- Juli Weiner, Emmy Award-winning writer at Last Week Tonight with John Oliver, formerly Vanity Fair

== See also ==
- Columbia University
- Barnard College
- Morningside Heights
- List of New York City newspapers and magazines
