= List of awards and nominations received by John Oliver =

John Oliver awards and nominations
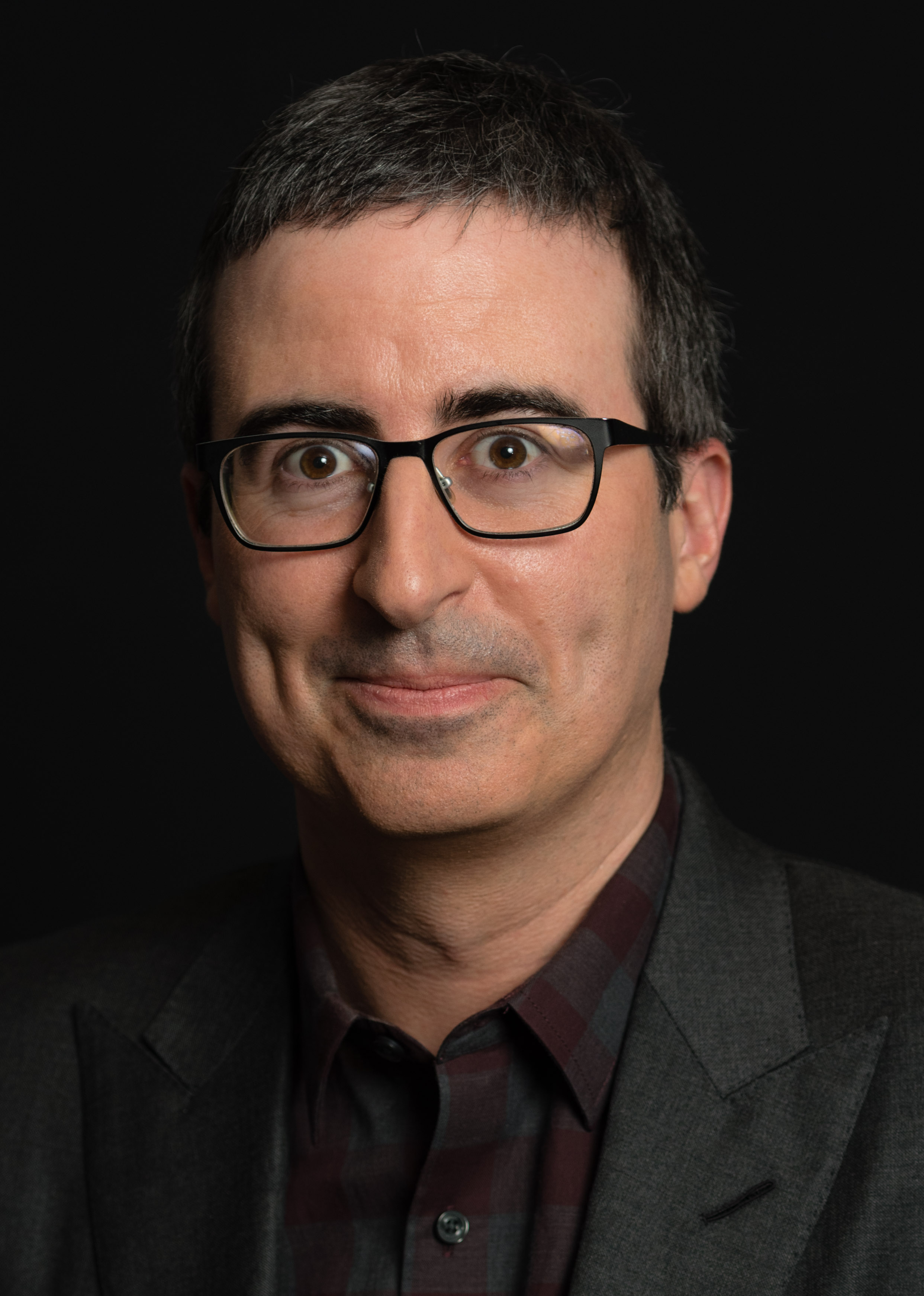
- Oliver in 2016
Awards and nominations
| Award | Wins | Nominations |
| Critics' Choice Real TV Awards | 1 | 2 |
| Critics' Choice Television Awards | 5 | 7 |
| Dorian Awards | 1 | 5 |
| Emmy Awards | 21 | 29 |
| Environmental Media Awards | 0 | 1 |
| GLAAD Media Awards | 2 | 6 |
| Grammy Awards | 1 | 1 |
| MTV Movie & TV Awards | 0 | 1 |
| Peabody Awards | 2 | 2 |
| People's Choice Awards | 0 | 4 |
| Producers Guild of America Awards | 9 | 10 |
| TCA Awards | 4 | 10 |
| Webby Awards | 2 | 2 |
| Writers Guild of America Awards | 8 | 16 |

Totals (Note: Certain award groups do not simply award one winner. They acknowledge several different recipients, have runners-up, and have third place. Since this is a specific recognition and is different from losing an award, runner-up mentions are considered wins in this award tally. For simplification and to avoid errors, each award in this list has been presumed to have had a prior nomination.)
- Wins: 56
- Nominations: 96

John Oliver is a British and American comedian, writer, producer, political commentator, actor, and television host. Oliver began as a comedian in the United Kingdom, growing to wider recognition after his work as senior British correspondent on the late-night news satire program The Daily Show with Jon Stewart from 2006 to 2013. Oliver guest-hosted the show for eight weeks in 2013 and received positive reviews, and soon after, HBO announced Oliver would receive his own talk show. Since 2014, he has hosted Last Week Tonight with John Oliver, for which he has received widespread recognition for influencing US legislature and culture, a phenomenon dubbed the "John Oliver effect". Additionally, Oliver co-hosted the satirical comedy podcast The Bugle with Andy Zaltzman and hosted John Oliver's New York Stand-Up Show on Comedy Central from 2010 to 2013. Oliver's acting career includes roles such as Ian Duncan on the NBC sitcom Community, Vanity Smurf in The Smurfs (2011) and The Smurfs 2 (2013), and Zazu in the 2019 remake of The Lion King.

Oliver won three Primetime Emmy Awards, one WGA Award, and one Grammy Award for his work at The Daily Show. For Last Week Tonight, he has received twenty Emmy Awards, two Peabody Awards, eight PGA Awards, and seven WGA Awards. Additionally, Oliver has received nominations for his writing on the Rally to Restore Sanity and/or Fear, and co-wrote Earth (The Book) while at The Daily Show, receiving a Grammy Award for the audiobook. In 2021, Oliver was awarded the Great Immigrants Award by the Carnegie Corporation of New York. Oliver has two locations named after him: The John Oliver Koala Chlamydia Ward at the Australia Zoo, part of a gag by actor Russell Crowe; and the John Oliver Memorial Sewer Plant in Danbury, Connecticut, announced by the Danbury mayor after Oliver criticised the city's jury selection process.

== Awards, honours, and nominations ==
Awards, honours, or nominations for Oliver himself are indicated with a hyphen (—).

Awards and nominations received by John Oliver
| Award | Year (Note: Indicates the year of ceremony) | Work | Category | Result | Ref. |
|---|---|---|---|---|---|
| Critics' Choice Real TV Awards | 2019 | Last Week Tonight with John Oliver | Best Talk Show | Won | |
| Critics' Choice Real TV Awards | 2021 | —N/a | Best Show Host | Won | |
| Critics' Choice Real TV Awards | 2022 | —N/a | Best Show Host | Nominated | |
| Critics' Choice Television Awards | 2015 | Last Week Tonight with John Oliver | Best Talk Show | Won | |
| Critics' Choice Television Awards | 2016a (Note: The ceremony for the 21st Critics' Choice Awards was held on January 17, 2016, and the ceremony for the 22nd Critics' Choice Awards was held on December 11, 2016.) | Last Week Tonight with John Oliver | Best Talk Show | Won | |
| Critics' Choice Television Awards | 2016b | Last Week Tonight with John Oliver | Best Talk Show | Nominated | |
| Critics' Choice Television Awards | 2020 | Last Week Tonight with John Oliver | Best Talk Show | Nominated | |
| Critics' Choice Television Awards | 2022 | Last Week Tonight with John Oliver | Best Talk Show | Won | |
| Critics' Choice Television Awards | 2023 | Last Week Tonight with John Oliver | Best Talk Show | Won | |
| Critics' Choice Television Awards | 2024 | Last Week Tonight with John Oliver | Best Talk Show | Won | |
| Daytime Emmy Awards | 2011 | Rally to Restore Sanity and/or Fear | Outstanding Special Class Writing | Nominated | |
| Dorian Awards | 2014 | —N/a | Wilde Wit of the Year | Won | |
| Dorian Awards | 2015 | —N/a | Wilde Wit of the Year | Nominated | |
| Dorian Awards | 2016 | —N/a | Wilde Wit of the Year | Nominated | |
| Dorian Awards | 2017 | —N/a | Wilde Wit of the Year | Nominated | |
| Dorian Awards | 2018 | —N/a | Wilde Wit of the Year | Nominated | |
| Environmental Media Awards | 2015 | Last Week Tonight with John Oliver | Best Reality Television | Nominated | |
| GLAAD Media Awards | 2015 | Last Week Tonight with John Oliver | Outstanding Variety or Talk Show Episode | Won | |
| GLAAD Media Awards | 2016 | Last Week Tonight with John Oliver | Outstanding Variety or Talk Show Episode | Nominated | |
| GLAAD Media Awards | 2018 | Last Week Tonight with John Oliver | Outstanding Variety or Talk Show Episode | Won | |
| GLAAD Media Awards | 2019 | Last Week Tonight with John Oliver | Outstanding Variety or Talk Show Episode | Nominated | |
| GLAAD Media Awards | 2019 | Wyatt Cenac's Problem Areas | Outstanding Variety or Talk Show Episode | Nominated | |
| GLAAD Media Awards | 2023 | Last Week Tonight with John Oliver | Outstanding Variety or Talk Show Episode | Nominated | |
| Grammy Awards | 2011 | The Daily Show with Jon Stewart Presents Earth (The Audiobook) | Best Spoken Word Album | Won | |
| Great Immigrants Awards | 2021 | —N/a | —N/a (Note: The Great Immigrants Awards does not have categories.) | Won | |
| MTV Movie & TV Awards | 2017 | —N/a | Best Host | Nominated | |
| Peabody Award | 2014 | Last Week Tonight with John Oliver | Entertainment | Won | |
| Peabody Award | 2017 | Last Week Tonight with John Oliver | Entertainment | Won | |
| People's Choice Awards | 2019 | Last Week Tonight with John Oliver | Nighttime Talk Show of 2019 | Nominated | |
| People's Choice Awards | 2020 | Last Week Tonight with John Oliver | Nighttime Talk Show of 2020 | Nominated | |
| People's Choice Awards | 2021 | Last Week Tonight with John Oliver | Nighttime Talk Show of 2021 | Nominated | |
| People's Choice Awards | 2022 | Last Week Tonight with John Oliver | Nighttime Talk Show of 2022 | Nominated | |
| Primetime Emmy Awards | 2008 | The Daily Show with Jon Stewart | Outstanding Writing for a Variety Series | Nominated | |
| Primetime Emmy Awards | 2009 | The Daily Show with Jon Stewart | Outstanding Writing for a Variety Series | Won | |
| Primetime Emmy Awards | 2010 | The Daily Show with Jon Stewart | Outstanding Writing for a Variety Series | Nominated | |
| Primetime Emmy Awards | 2011 | The Daily Show with Jon Stewart | Outstanding Writing for a Variety Series | Won | |
| Primetime Emmy Awards | 2012 | The Daily Show with Jon Stewart | Outstanding Writing for a Variety Series | Won | |
| Primetime Emmy Awards | 2013 | The Daily Show with Jon Stewart | Outstanding Writing for a Variety Series | Nominated | |
| Primetime Emmy Awards | 2014 | The Daily Show with Jon Stewart | Outstanding Writing for a Variety Series | Nominated | |
| Primetime Emmy Awards | 2015 | Last Week Tonight with John Oliver | Outstanding Writing for a Variety Series | Nominated | |
| Primetime Emmy Awards | 2015 | Last Week Tonight with John Oliver | Outstanding Variety Talk Series | Nominated | |
| Primetime Emmy Awards | 2016 | Last Week Tonight with John Oliver | Outstanding Variety Talk Series | Won | |
| Primetime Emmy Awards | 2016 | Last Week Tonight with John Oliver | Outstanding Writing for a Variety Series | Won | |
| Primetime Emmy Awards | 2017 | Last Week Tonight with John Oliver | Outstanding Variety Talk Series | Won | |
| Primetime Emmy Awards | 2017 | Last Week Tonight with John Oliver | Outstanding Writing for a Variety Series | Won | |
| Primetime Emmy Awards | 2018 | Last Week Tonight with John Oliver | Outstanding Variety Talk Series | Won | |
| Primetime Emmy Awards | 2018 | Last Week Tonight with John Oliver | Outstanding Writing for a Variety Series | Won | |
| Primetime Emmy Awards | 2019 | Last Week Tonight with John Oliver | Outstanding Variety Talk Series | Won | |
| Primetime Emmy Awards | 2019 | Last Week Tonight with John Oliver | Outstanding Writing for a Variety Series | Won | |
| Primetime Emmy Awards | 2020 | Last Week Tonight with John Oliver | Outstanding Variety Talk Series | Won | |
| Primetime Emmy Awards | 2020 | Last Week Tonight with John Oliver | Outstanding Writing for a Variety Series | Won | |
| Primetime Emmy Awards | 2021 | Last Week Tonight with John Oliver | Outstanding Variety Talk Series | Won | |
| Primetime Emmy Awards | 2021 | Last Week Tonight with John Oliver | Outstanding Writing for a Variety Series | Won | |
| Primetime Emmy Awards | 2022 | Last Week Tonight with John Oliver | Outstanding Variety Talk Series | Won | |
| Primetime Emmy Awards | 2022 | Last Week Tonight with John Oliver | Outstanding Writing for a Variety Series | Won | |
| Primetime Emmy Awards | 2023 | Last Week Tonight with John Oliver | Outstanding Scripted Variety Series | Won | |
| Primetime Emmy Awards | 2023 | Last Week Tonight with John Oliver | Outstanding Writing for a Variety Series | Won | |
| Primetime Emmy Awards | 2024 | Last Week Tonight with John Oliver | Outstanding Scripted Variety Series | Won | |
| Primetime Emmy Awards | 2024 | Last Week Tonight with John Oliver | Outstanding Writing for a Variety Series | Won | |
| Primetime Emmy Awards | 2025 | Last Week Tonight with John Oliver | Outstanding Scripted Variety Series | Won | |
| Primetime Emmy Awards | 2025 | Last Week Tonight with John Oliver | Outstanding Writing for a Variety Series | Won | |
| Producers Guild of America Awards | 2015 | Last Week Tonight with John Oliver | Outstanding Producer of Live Entertainment & Talk Television | Nominated | |
| Producers Guild of America Awards | 2016 | Last Week Tonight with John Oliver | Outstanding Producer of Live Entertainment & Talk Television | Won | |
| Producers Guild of America Awards | 2017 | Last Week Tonight with John Oliver | Outstanding Producer of Live Entertainment & Talk Television | Won | |
| Producers Guild of America Awards | 2018 | Last Week Tonight with John Oliver | Outstanding Producer of Live Entertainment & Talk Television | Won | |
| Producers Guild of America Awards | 2019 | Last Week Tonight with John Oliver | Outstanding Producer of Live Entertainment & Talk Television | Won | |
| Producers Guild of America Awards | 2020 | Last Week Tonight with John Oliver | Outstanding Producer of Live Entertainment & Talk Television | Won | |
| Producers Guild of America Awards | 2021 | Last Week Tonight with John Oliver | Outstanding Producer of Live Entertainment & Talk Television | Won | |
| Producers Guild of America Awards | 2022 | Last Week Tonight with John Oliver | Outstanding Producer of Live Entertainment, Variety, Sketch, Standup & Talk Television | Won | |
| Producers Guild of America Awards | 2023 | Last Week Tonight with John Oliver | Outstanding Producer of Live Entertainment, Variety, Sketch, Standup & Talk Television | Won | |
| Producers Guild of America Awards | 2024 | Last Week Tonight with John Oliver | Outstanding Producer of Live Entertainment, Variety, Sketch, Standup & Talk Television | Won | |
| Television Critics Association Awards | 2015 | Last Week Tonight with John Oliver | Outstanding Achievement in News and Information | Won | |
| Television Critics Association Awards | 2016 | Last Week Tonight with John Oliver | Outstanding Achievement in News and Information | Nominated | |
| Television Critics Association Awards | 2017 | Last Week Tonight with John Oliver | Outstanding Achievement in News and Information | Nominated | |
| Television Critics Association Awards | 2018 | Last Week Tonight with John Oliver | Outstanding Achievement in Sketch/Variety Shows | Won | |
| Television Critics Association Awards | 2019 | Last Week Tonight with John Oliver | Outstanding Achievement in Sketch/Variety Shows | Won | |
| Television Critics Association Awards | 2020 | Last Week Tonight with John Oliver | Outstanding Achievement in Sketch/Variety Shows | Nominated | |
| Television Critics Association Awards | 2021 | Last Week Tonight with John Oliver | Outstanding Achievement in Sketch/Variety Shows | Won | |
| Television Critics Association Awards | 2022 | Last Week Tonight with John Oliver | Outstanding Achievement in Sketch/Variety Shows | Nominated | |
| Television Critics Association Awards | 2023 | Last Week Tonight with John Oliver | Outstanding Achievement in Sketch/Variety Shows | Nominated | |
| Television Critics Association Awards | 2024 | Last Week Tonight with John Oliver | Outstanding Achievement in Sketch/Variety Shows | Nominated | |
| Webby Awards | 2015 | Last Week Tonight with John Oliver | Best Writing in Social | Won | |
| Webby Awards | 2016 | Last Week Tonight with John Oliver | Best Writing in Social | Won | |
| Writers Guild of America Awards | 2009 | The Daily Show with Jon Stewart | Television: Comedy-Variety Talk Series | Nominated | |
| Writers Guild of America Awards | 2010 | The Daily Show with Jon Stewart | Television: Comedy-Variety Talk Series | Won | |
| Writers Guild of America Awards | 2011 | The Daily Show with Jon Stewart | Television: Comedy-Variety Talk Series | Nominated | |
| Writers Guild of America Awards | 2012 | The Daily Show with Jon Stewart | Television: Comedy-Variety Talk Series | Nominated | |
| Writers Guild of America Awards | 2013 | The Daily Show with Jon Stewart | Television: Comedy-Variety Talk Series | Nominated | |
| Writers Guild of America Awards | 2014 | The Daily Show with Jon Stewart | Television: Comedy-Variety Talk Series | Nominated | |
| Writers Guild of America Awards | 2015 | The Daily Show with Jon Stewart | Television: Comedy-Variety Talk Series | Nominated | |
| Writers Guild of America Awards | 2015 | Last Week Tonight with John Oliver | Television: Comedy-Variety Talk Series | Won | |
| Writers Guild of America Awards | 2017 | Last Week Tonight with John Oliver | Television: Comedy-Variety Talk Series | Won | |
| Writers Guild of America Awards | 2018 | Last Week Tonight with John Oliver | Television: Comedy-Variety Talk Series | Won | |
| Writers Guild of America Awards | 2019 | Last Week Tonight with John Oliver | Television: Comedy-Variety Talk Series | Won | |
| Writers Guild of America Awards | 2020 | Last Week Tonight with John Oliver | Television: Comedy-Variety Talk Series | Won | |
| Writers Guild of America Awards | 2021 | Last Week Tonight with John Oliver | Television: Comedy-Variety Talk Series | Nominated | |
| Writers Guild of America Awards | 2022 | Last Week Tonight with John Oliver | Television: Comedy-Variety Talk Series | Nominated | |
| Writers Guild of America Awards | 2023 | Last Week Tonight with John Oliver | Television: Comedy-Variety Talk Series | Won | |
| Writers Guild of America Awards | 2024 | Last Week Tonight with John Oliver | Television: Comedy-Variety Talk Series | Won | |

== See also ==
- List of awards and nominations received by The Daily Show
- List of awards and nominations received by Last Week Tonight with John Oliver
