= Planet Tad =

Book by Tim Carvell

- Author: Tim Carvell
- Illustrator: Doug Holgate
- Language: English
- Genre: Comedy
- Publisher: HarperCollins
- Publication date: May 8, 2012
- Publication place: United States
- Media type: Print (Hardback & e-book)
- Pages: 256
- ISBN: 978-0061934360
- OCLC: 757483808

Planet Tad is a 2012 comedic children's novel by Tim Carvell. The book is based on the ongoing Mad magazine feature of the same name. Planet Tad was published by HarperCollins in May 2012.

== Plot ==
Planet Tad consists of daily blog articles that discuss events of the day in Tad's life, as well as random thoughts he might have. The arc of the story follows Tad's attempts to fulfill his New Year's resolution, which involve him starting a blog, finishing seventh grade, learning to perform a kickflip on his skateboard, getting favorable attention from girls, and starting to shave.

== Sequel ==
The second book in the series, Return to Planet Tad, released in 2014, follows Tad in the next year of his social life in the 8th grade.

== Reception ==
Critical reception for Planet Tad was mixed. Kidzworld.com called it a "quick humorous read". Publishers Weekly and the Westend Times both praised the book, with the Westend Times citing its appeal to a wide age range as a positive feature. A reviewer for the New York Times wrote that the book did have an appeal but that it "only sometimes seems like the voice of an authentic 2012 seventh grader". Common Sense Media gave the book three stars, praising the book's funny moments while stating that Planet Tad was "heavy on consumer product and media references". Kirkus Reviews criticized the book, calling it "a phoned-in Diary of a Wimpy Kid wannabe" and "tedious".
