= Marc Tracy =

American journalist

- Education: Columbia University (BA)
- Occupation: Journalist
- Organization: The New York Times
- Spouse: Amanda Hess
- Awards: National Jewish Book Award (2012); National Magazine Award for Blogging (2011)

Marc Aaron Tracy is an American journalist. He is a reporter on the Culture desk at The New York Times. Tracy was a staff writer at The New Republic and at Tablet, where he won a National Magazine Award for Blogging. He also won a National Jewish Book Award in 2012 for co-editing the anthology Jewish Jocks: An Unorthodox Hall of Fame.

== Biography ==
Tracy received his BA from Columbia University in 2007. He was a senior editor for The Blue and White and a writer for the Columbia Political Review. Tracy started his journalism career at Tablet magazine, where he ran the blog that won the last National Magazine Award given for blogging. While editing Tablet's blog, Tracy approached Franklin Foer about writing a sports-themed book, which eventually led to the idea for the anthology Jewish Jocks. The book won a 2012 National Jewish Book Award. The New Republic hired Tracy as a staff writer in 2012, writing about the media, politics and New York City intelligentsia.

In 2014, Tracy joined the staff of The New York Times, covering college athletics for the paper's Sports desk. He joined the Business desk in 2019, covering topics in the media industry including the decline of local print media and The New York Times Company. In 2022, Tracy joined the paper's Culture desk to cover debates about representation and politics in the arts.

== Personal life ==
Tracy is married to Amanda Hess, who is also a journalist and critic at The New York Times.
