= The Blue and White =

US undergraduate magazine

- Type: Monthly magazine
- Publisher: Lucy Spencer Mason
- Editor-in-chief: Natalie Buttner
- Deputy editor: Nnema Épée-Bounya
- Managing editor: Duda Kovarsky Rotta
- Founded: 1890; 136 years ago
- Headquarters: New York, New York
- Website: www.theblueandwhite.org

The Blue and White is a magazine written by undergraduates at Columbia University, New York City. Founded in 1890, the magazine has dedicated itself throughout its existence to providing students an outlet for intellectual and political discussion, literary publication, and general parody.

== History ==
Founded in 1890, the magazine disbanded for unknown reasons in 1893. It was not until 1998 that a handful of undergraduates revived the journal based on the original format. The staff has since grown to several dozen writers and contributors. In switching to a monthly in 2005, the magazine affirmed its place as a campus fixture. Recently, the magazine has begun to focus more on pieces of "hard" journalism, in contradistinction to its former, less serious, and more literary character. The Blue and White staff meets in the crypt of St. Paul's Chapel.

=== Bwog ===
In 2006, The Blue and White established Bwog, an online blog counterpart to the magazine. Bwog aims to bring its readership gossip and other Columbia news around the clock. It first gained national recognition for its coverage of a violent protest against the Minutemen illegal immigration group that occurred at Columbia in 2006 and for Iranian President Mahmoud Ahmadinejad's controversial visit to the university in 2007. Years later, in December 2010, Bwog gained national media attention again for its reactive coverage of Operation Ivy League, a notorious campus drug bust.

== Alumni ==
- Christopher Beam, writer for Slate
- Michael Yates Crowley, playwright
- Telis Demos, writer for the Wall Street Journal
- Franklin Foer (Honorary), Editor of the New Republic
- Daniel Immerwahr, author
- Kate Linthicum, writer for the Los Angeles Times
- Anna Phillips, writer for The New York Times' School Book
- Dave Plotz, Senior Editor at Bloggingheads.tv
- Marc Tracy, staff writer at The New York Times
- Juli Weiner, blogger for Vanity Fair
- Gideon Yago, correspondent for MTV News
- Avi Zenilman, executive editor for The National Memo
