= Amanda Hess =

American journalist

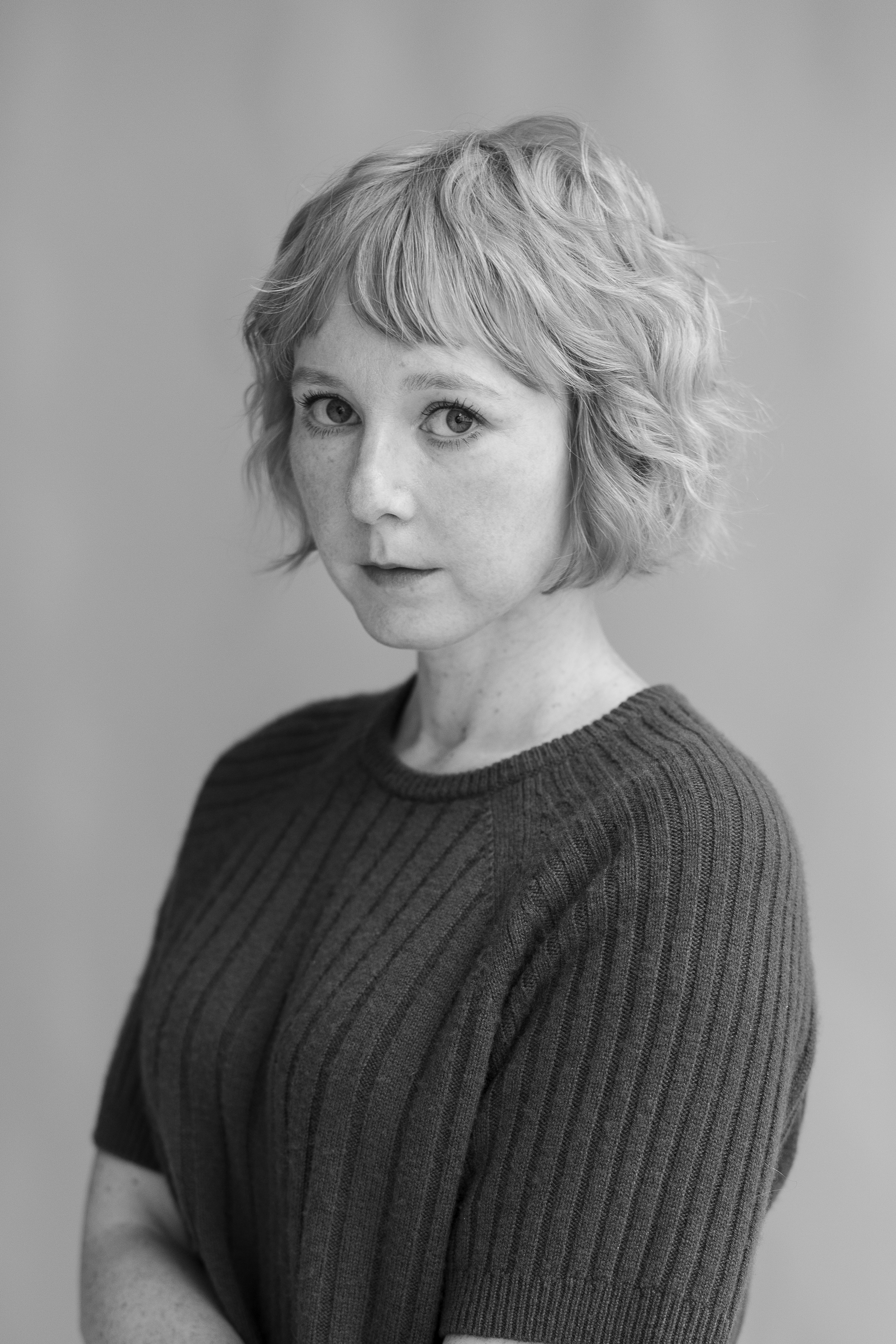
- Hess in 2024
- Born: United States
- Occupations: Journalist, critic, writer
- Employer: The New York Times
- Spouse: Marc Tracy
- Children: 1

Amanda Stromwall Hess is an American journalist known for her coverage of internet culture. She is a critic-at-large for The New York Times who has also written for magazines including Wired, ESPN, and Elle.

== Early life ==
Amanda Hess is the daughter of Layne Stromwall and Gerald Hess of North Scottsdale, Arizona. Hess graduated from George Washington University in Washington, D.C.

== Career ==
Hess was an internet columnist for Slate magazine, an editor for GOOD magazine, and a nightlife and arts columnist for the Washington City Paper.

Hess first published May 10, 2013, for T magazine about a Hollywood party for the year's Playboy Playmate of the Year.

=== Pacific Standard ===
Hess wrote an essay for Pacific Standard, "Why Women Aren't Welcome on the Internet," in 2014, which detailed her experience and that of other women as victims of misogynistic online harassment. The essay won The Sidney Hillman Foundation's 2014 Sidney Award as well as the 2015 American Society of Magazine Editors Public Interest Award. Conor Friedersdorf wrote in The Atlantic that Hess's article was "persuasive in arguing that the online threats of violence are pervasive and have broad implications in a digital society."

=== The New York Times ===
In March 2016, Hess was named one of three inaugural David Carr Fellowship recipients at The New York Times.

Hess began, in 2017, a self-branded video series for The New York Times about internet culture called "Internetting With Amanda Hess", beginning October 31, 2017, lasting 5 episodes for the 2017 season, and 5 episodes for 2018 season with 3 Internetting After Dark episodes ending October 24, 2018.

As of December 2023, Hess is a critic-at-large for The New York Times and a contributor to the New York Times Magazine.

== Personal life ==
Hess and Marc Aaron Tracy were married on November 2, 2019, at Brooklyn Historical Society in Brooklyn, New York, by Rabbi Matt Green. They have one son.

== Works ==
- Hess, Amanda (2025-05-06). Second Life. New York: Doubleday Books. ISBN 978-0-385-54973-8.
