= Juli Weiner =

American television writer and blogger

- Education: Barnard College (BA)
- Occupation: Screenwriter
- Years active: 2010–present
- Awards: Primetime Emmy Award for Outstanding Writing for a Variety Series (2016–2020)

Juli Weiner is an American writer known for her work on the HBO show Last Week Tonight with John Oliver.

== Biography ==
Weiner is a native of Maple Glen, Pennsylvania. Her father is a breast surgeon. She graduated from Upper Dublin High School and from Barnard College in 2010. In college, she interned for Teen Vogue and blogged for Wonkette. She also wrote for The Huffington Post and The New Yorker. She was also the editor of Bwog and The Blue and White, both student-run publications at Columbia. She joined Vanity Fair in February 2010 while an undergraduate at Barnard. Donald Trump called her a "bad writer" after she wrote an online piece critical of him in 2011.

Weiner joined the staff of Last Week Tonight with John Oliver as one of only two women in the writing staff. She won five Primetime Emmy Award for Outstanding Writing for a Variety Series as a member of the writing staff from 2016 to 2020 and was nominated for another Emmy Award in 2015. She is a four-time winner of the Writers Guild of America Award for Television: Comedy-Variety Talk Series. In 2015, she was named one of the Forbes 30 Under 30.

She was a writer-producer on the HBO series The Franchise and The Regime.

She served as writer and supervising producer of the FX series Love Story: John F. Kennedy Jr. & Carolyn Bessette. In recently, Weiner is a writer and co-executive producer of the FX series The Shards, and Hulu's All's Fair.

== Personal life ==
Weiner married The New York Times reporter Michael Grynbaum in 2019 at the National Arts Club, and has contributed pieces to The New York Times.

== See also ==
- New Yorkers in journalism
