= Tim Carvell =

American writer and television producer

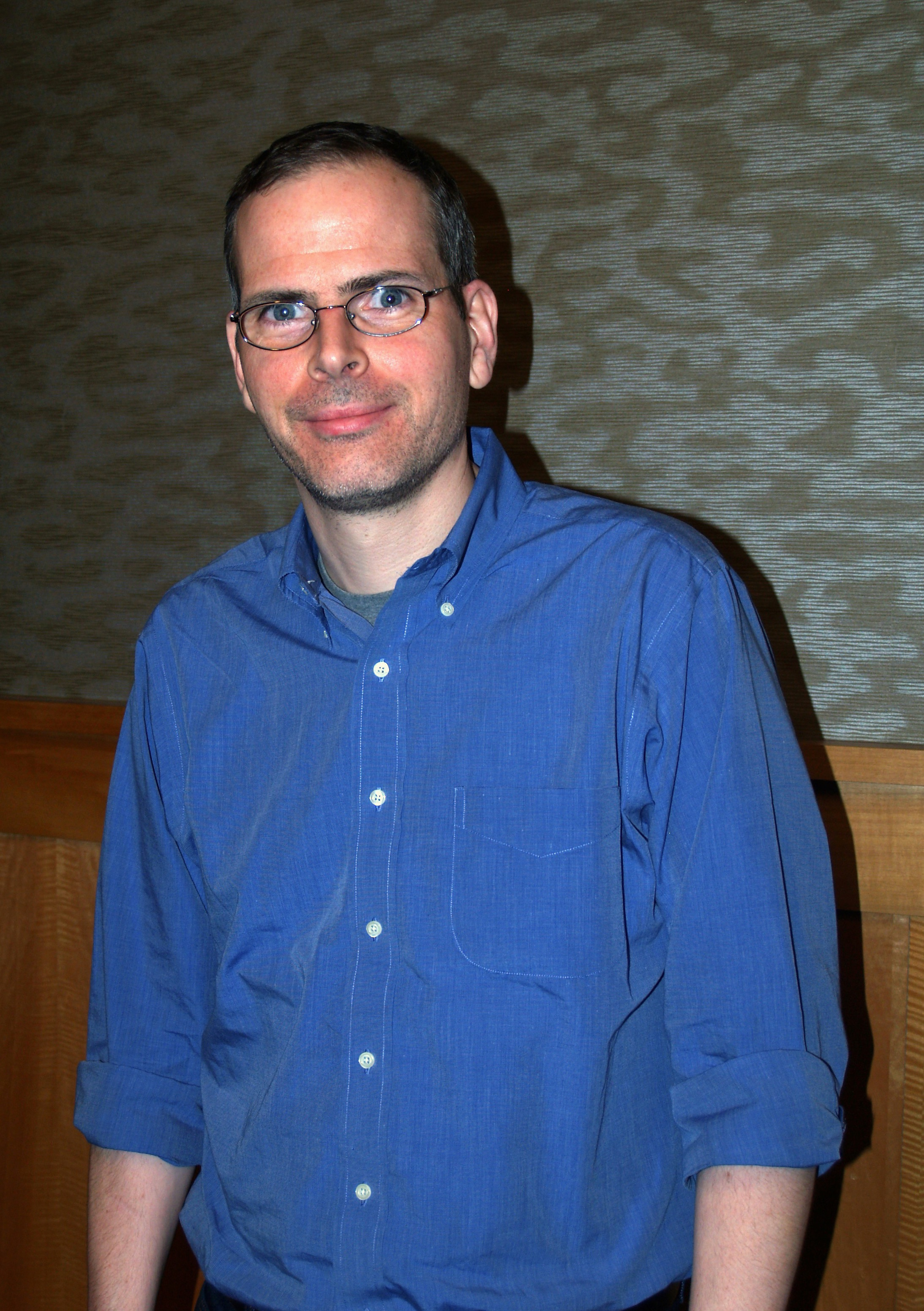
- Carvell at a November 18, 2013, signing for Inside Mad in Manhattan
- Born: 1974 (age 51–52); Bloomfield Hills, Michigan U.S.
- Education: Columbia University (1995)
- Occupations: Writer, satirist, producer
- Spouse: Thomas Keeton
- Writing career
- Genres: Comedy, satire
- Notable works: The Daily Show with Jon Stewart; Last Week Tonight with John Oliver; Planet Tad
- Notable awards: 3 consecutive Emmy Awards (2004–06)

Tim Carvell is an American writer and television producer known for his work on the TV satirical news series Last Week Tonight with John Oliver and The Daily Show with Jon Stewart, as well as for his print work in publications including Mad, Slate, and The New York Times.

== Career ==
For the first nine years after he graduated from college, Carvell wrote for a number of New York-based publications, including Fortune, Sports Illustrated for Women and Entertainment Weekly. He also contributed humor pieces to McSweeney's Quarterly Concern and the op-ed page of The New York Times.

Carvell stumbled into a comedy career "by accident". He heard about an opening on the TV comedy series The Daily Show with Jon Stewart from Steve Bodow, one of the writers on that show. He submitted a writing sample that consisted of the headlines that Jon Stewart reads at the desk and dialogue between Stewart and correspondents. Carvell was then interviewed by the show's head writer and the executive producer. He joined the show in March 2004, just as the 2004 U.S. presidential campaign was becoming a common news topic. Describing the subsequent meeting with Stewart as "surreal", Carvell says, "it felt uncannily like I was suddenly a guest on the show, only without a book or movie to promote." In 2011, Carvell became the series' head writer. As a staff writer for the show, he won six Emmy Awards between 2004 and 2012.

Since 2005, he has written the "Planet Tad" column for Mad magazine. In 2012, he wrote a book based on the column, also called Planet Tad. In 2014, Carvell followed John Oliver to his new HBO series Last Week Tonight with John Oliver, where he serves as showrunner for the series.

== Personal life ==
Tim Carvell is a native of Bloomfield Hills, a suburb of Detroit. He entered Columbia University in 1991, majoring in history. While there, he wrote news and features for Spectator which he described as "as good a journalism education as you could get. It allowed you to learn by making mistakes, without suffering real consequences." He graduated in 1995.

Carvell married his partner, Thomas Keeton, on June 28, 2014.
