= Ali Barthwell =

American writer

- Born: Chicago, Illinois, U.S.
- Education: Wellesley College (BA)
- Occupation: Writer
- Years active: 2016–present
- Notable work: Last Week Tonight with John Oliver (staff writer)
- Awards: Primetime Emmy Award for Outstanding Writing for a Variety Series (2021; 2022)

Ali Barthwell is an American writer. She reviews television for Vulture and is a staff writer for Last Week Tonight with John Oliver, for which she won three Primetime Emmy Awards for Outstanding Writing for a Variety Series.

== Life and career ==
Barthwell was born and raised in Chicago. Both of her parents are physicians. She received her bachelor's degree from Wellesley College in 2010, where she was the co-president of the improv group Dead Serious. Shortly after graduating she won a scholarship to train in improv and sketch comedy at Second City. She was inspired to apply after seeing Amber Ruffin perform on the Second City Mainstage.

She has written television recaps and reviews for Vulture since 2016. She has recapped programs including Empire, How to Get Away with Murder, and productions from The Bachelor franchise.

Along with her two brothers and two friends, Barthwell organized the inaugural WakandaCon in Chicago in August 2018, inspired by the release of Black Panther. The event was received positively and drew approximately 2,500 attendees. Barthwell connected the event to afrofuturism and described WakandaCon as "a space for Black people to look past the present and into our future."

She joined the writing staff of Last Week Tonight with John Oliver in 2020. Barthwell won successive Primetime Emmy Awards for Outstanding Writing for a Variety Series in 2021 and 2022 for her work.

== Awards and nominations ==
Year	Award	Category	Nominated work	Result	Ref.
2021	Primetime Emmy Awards	Outstanding Writing for a Variety Series	Last Week Tonight with John Oliver	Won	
2022	Primetime Emmy Awards	Outstanding Writing for a Variety Series	Last Week Tonight with John Oliver	Won	
2023	Primetime Emmy Awards	Outstanding Writing for a Variety Series	Last Week Tonight with John Oliver	Won	
2021	Writers Guild of America Awards	Comedy/Variety Talk Series	Last Week Tonight with John Oliver	Nominated	
2022	Writers Guild of America Awards	Comedy/Variety Talk Series	Last Week Tonight with John Oliver	Nominated	
2023	Writers Guild of America Awards	Comedy/Variety Talk Series	Last Week Tonight with John Oliver	Won	
