= Ryan Ken =

American writer, actor and comedian

- Born: 1991 or 1992 (age 34–35); South Carolina, U.S.
- Occupations: Actor, writer, comedian
- Years active: 2020–present

Ryan Ken is an American writer, actor, and comedian. They are best known for their sketch comedy videos posted to Instagram, TikTok, and Twitter. Ken's work has been recognized by Vulture, The Hollywood Reporter, NPR, and the Los Angeles Times. They have won two Primetime Emmy Awards and a WGA Award as a staff writer on Last Week Tonight.

== Early life and education ==
Ken was born and raised in South Carolina. They performed in their first theatrical production in elementary school. Although Ken enjoyed the experience, they instead chose to focus on training as a violinist.

They received their master's degree in arts administration from the Art Institute of Chicago.

== Career ==
Ken gained prominence in 2020 for their sketch comedy videos that they created as an outlet for anxiety resulting from the COVID-19 pandemic. Shared to Twitter, Instagram, and TikTok, many of the videos satirize current events or pop culture with commentary on sociopolitical topics like race, gender, and sexuality. Past videos have included a scenario about the lunch break on the set of a movie about slavery, a neighbor listening to the titular characters argue in Malcolm & Marie, "73 Questions with Mitch McConnell" in the style of the Vogue videos, and an actor auditioning to play the gay friend in a 90s sitcom. Malcolm Venable of Shondaland.com described the videos as "less about jokes and more about blowing up the toxic codes we've ignored or endured without interrogating them."

They gained wider notoriety after Tina Knowles reposted their Malcolm & Marie parody video on Instagram. In 2021, Ken's work was recognized by outlets including Vulture, The Hollywood Reporter, Los Angeles Times, and Linda Holmes of NPR.

Ken co-hosts the podcast Let Me Back Up with Jennie Crichlow.

In 2022, they joined the writing staff of Last Week Tonight with John Oliver.

== Personal life ==
Ken is non-binary and uses they/them pronouns. They are queer.

== Awards and nominations ==
Year	Award	Category	Nominated work	Result	Ref
2022	Primetime Emmy Awards	Outstanding Writing for a Variety Series	Last Week Tonight with John Oliver	Won	
2023	Writers Guild of America Awards	Comedy/Variety Talk Series	Last Week Tonight with John Oliver	Won	
2024	Primetime Emmy Award	Outstanding Writing for a Variety Series	Last Week Tonight with John Oliver	Won	
2024	Primetime Emmy Award	Outstanding Writing for a Variety Series	Last Week Tonight with John Oliver	Won	
