= Writers Guild of America Award for Television: Best Comedy/Variety – Specials =

Television award in the USA

Writers Guild of America Award for Television: Comedy/Variety Special
- Awarded for: Outstanding Writing for a Comedy or Variety Special
- Country: United States
- Presented by: Writers Guild of America
- First award: 1987
- Currently held by: Full Frontal Wants to Take Your Guns (2021)
- Website: www.wga.org

The Writers Guild of America Award for Best Television Writing in a Comedy/Variety Specials is an award presented by the Writers Guild of America to the best written television comedy or variety specials. During the 70s, different categories were presented to recognize writing in comedy or variety specials until 1987, when the category Variety – Musical, Award, Tribute, Special Event started to be awarded, later being renamed to its current name, Comedy/Variety Special.

== Winners and nominees ==
The winners are indicated in gold and in bold.

=== 1970s ===
Best Written Variety Script

Year	Program	Writer(s)	Network
1973 (26th)
1973 (26th)	**Lily**	**Bob Illes, Rosalyn Drexler, Lorne Michaels, Richard Pryor, Jim Rusk, Herbert Sargent, James R. Stein, Lily Tomlin, Jane Wagner, George Yanok, Ann Elder, Karyl Miller and Rod Warren**	**CBS**

Best Variety Series or Special – Musical or Comedy

Year	Program	Writer(s)	Network
1977 (30th)
1977 (30th)	**The Carol Burnett Show**	**Ed Simmons, Roger Beatty, Rick Hawkins, Liz Sage, Bob Illes, James R. Stein, Franelle Silver, Larry Siegel, Tim Conway, Bill Richmond, Gene Perret, Dick Clair and Jenna McMahon**	**CBS**
1978 (31st)
1978 (31st)	**The Carol Burnett Show** **"Steve Martin and Betty White"**	**Roger Beatty, Rick Hawkins, Liz Sage, Bob Illes, James R. Stein, Franelle Silver, Larry Siegel, Tim Conway, Bill Richmond, Gene Perret, Dick Clair, Jenna McMahon and Ed Simmons**	**CBS**

=== 1980s ===
Best Variety, Musical or Comedy

Year	Program	Writer(s)	Network
1980 (33rd)
1980 (33rd)	**All Commercials, A Steve Martin Special**	**Steve Martin, Neal Israel, Jeffrey Barron, Earl Brown, Carmen Finestra, Denny Johnston, Sean Kelly, Pat McCormick, Michael McManus, Pat Proft and Mason Williams**	**NBC**
1982 (35th)
1982 (35th)	**I Love Liberty**	**Rita Mae Brown, Arthur Allan Seidelman, Rick Mitz, Richard Alfieri and Norman Lear**	**ABC**

Variety – Musical, Award, Tribute, Special Event

Year	Program	Writer(s)	Network
1987 (40th)
1987 (40th)	**Will Rogers: Look Back in Laughter**	**Bennett Tramer**	**HBO**
1987 (40th)	19th Annual NAACP Image Awards	Daryl G. Nickens, Rita Cash, Royce Osborn Jr.	NBC
1988 (41st)
1988 (41st)	**A Muppet Family Christmas**	**Jerry Juhl**	**ABC**
1988 (41st)	Family Comedy Hour	Jack Elinson, Jay Leno, Marvin Silbermintz, Jay Teitzell, Ted Herrmann, Wayne Kline	NBC
1989 (42nd)
1989 (42nd)	**The Earth Day Special**	**Steve Tamerius**	**ABC**

Variety – Musical

Year	Program	Writer(s)	Network
1989 (42nd)
1989 (42nd)	**Not Necessarily the News**	**Nancy Harris, Larry Arnstein, Steve Barker, Joe Guppy, Matt Neuman, Duncan Scott McGibbon, Jon Ross, Lane Sarasohn, Steve Young, Merrill Markoe, Tom Kramer, Peter Ocko**	**HBO**

=== 1990s ===
Variety – Musical, Award, Tribute, Special Event

Year	Program	Writer(s)	Network
1992 (45th)
1992 (45th)	**Medusa: Dare to Be Truthful**	**Julie Brown and Charlie Coffey**	**Showtime**
1993 (46th)
1993 (46th)	**This Just In** **"Show 2"**	**Matt Neuman, Larry Arnstein, Jon Ross, Lane Sarasohn, and John Derevlany**	**ABC**
1993 (46th)	Bob Hope: The First 90 Years	Buz Kohan, Linda Perret, Martha Bolton, and Gene Perret	NBC
1994 (47th)
1994 (47th)	**Tracey Ullman Takes on New York**	**Tony Sheehan, Dick Clement, Ian La Frenais, Stephen Nathan, and Marc Flanagan**	**HBO**
1995 (48th)
1995 (48th)	**Dennis Miller Live** **"Episode 8"**	**Eddie Feldmann, Jeff Cesario, Ed Driscoll, David Feldman, Gregory Greenberg, Dennis Miller, and Kevin Rooney**	**HBO**
1995 (48th)	AFI Life Achievement Award: A Tribute to Steven Spielberg	Robert Shrum, and George Stevens Jr.	NBC
1996 (49th)
1996 (49th)	**Dennis Miller: Citizen Arcane**	**Dennis Miller**	**HBO**
1996 (49th)	Sinatra: 80 Years My Way	Buz Kohan, George Schlatter	ABC
1996 (49th)	The Kennedy Center Honors: A Celebration of the Performing Arts	Robert Shrum, George Stevens Jr., Sara Lukinson, John Frook	CBS

Comedy/Variety – Music, Awards, Tributes – Specials – Any Length

Year	Program	Writer(s)	Network
1998 (51st)
1998 (51st)	**Ellen: A Hollywood Tribute**	**Tim Doyle**	**ABC**
1998 (51st)	AFI Life Achievement Award: A Tribute to Robert Wise	Robert Shrum, Chris Henchy and George Stevens Jr.	NBC
1999 (52nd)
1999 (52nd)	**The Kennedy Center Honors: A Celebration of the Performing Arts**	**Robert Shrum, George Stevens Jr. and Sara Lukinson**	**CBS**

=== 2000s ===
Comedy/Variety (Music, Awards, Tributes) – Specials

Year	Program	Writer(s)	Network
2000 (53rd)
2000 (53rd)	**Saturday Night Live: 25th Anniversary Special**	**Tina Fey, Anne Beatts, Tom Davis, Steve Higgins, Lorne Michaels, Marilyn Suzanne Miller, Paula Pell, Paul Shaffer, T. Sean Shannon, Michael Shoemaker, Robert Smigel**	**NBC**
2000 (53rd)	Evening at Pops Special featuring the Cast of Sesame Street	Christine Ferraro	PBS
2001 (54th)
2001 (54th)	**The Kennedy Center Honors**	**Don Baer, George Stevens Jr., Sara Lukinson and Harry Miles Muheim**	**CBS**
2001 (54th)	Saturday Night Live: Presidential Bash 2000	James Downey and Al Franken	NBC
2002 (55th)
2002 (55th)	**The Kennedy Center Honors**	**Don Baer, George Stevens Jr. and Sara Lukinson**	**CBS**
2002 (55th)	NBC 75th Anniversary Special	Doug Abeles, James Anderson, Robert Carlock, Tina Fey, Charlie Grandy, Steve Higgins, Lorne Michaels, Paula Pell, Herbert Sargent, Michael Schur, Michael Shoemaker	NBC
2003 (56th)
2003 (56th)	**The 75th Annual Academy Awards**	**Hal Kanter, Rita Cash, Buz Kohan, Steve Martin, Beth Armogida, Dave Barry, Dave Boone, Andy Breckman, Jon Macks, Rita Rudner, Bruce Vilanch**	**ABC**
2003 (56th)	The Kennedy Center Honors	George Stevens Jr., Sara Lukinson and David Leaf	CBS
2004 (57th)
2004 (57th)	**The Kennedy Center Honors**	**George Stevens Jr., Sara Lukinson and David Leaf**	**CBS**
2004 (57th)	The 58th Annual Tony Awards	Dave Boone, Bruce Vilanch	CBS
2005 (58th)
2005 (58th)	**The Kennedy Center Honors**	**George Stevens Jr., Sara Lukinson**	**CBS**
2005 (58th)	The 59th Annual Tony Awards	Dave Boone, Jon Macks	CBS
2006 (59th)
2006 (59th)	**The National Memorial Day Concert**	**Joan Meyerson**	**PBS**
2006 (59th)	Assume the Position with Mr. Wuhl	Robert Wuhl, Allan Stephan, Rebecca Reynolds	HBO
2006 (59th)	The 60th Annual Tony Awards	Dave Boone	CBS
2007 (60th)
2007 (60th)	Not awarded		
2008 (61st)
2008 (61st)	**23rd Independent Spirit Awards**	**Billy Kimball, Aaron Lee, Jennifer Celotta, and Rainn Wilson**	**IFC, AMC**
2008 (61st)	Jimmy Kimmel's Big Night of Stars	Jimmy Kimmel, Gary Greenberg, Molly McNearney, Bryan Paulk, Ned Rice, Jon Bines, Will Burke, Rick Rosner, Jake Lentz, Sal Iacono, and Tony Barbieri	ABC
2009 (62nd)
2009 (62nd)	**24th Independent Spirit Awards**	**Billy Kimball and Neal MacLennan**	**IFC, AMC**
2009 (62nd)	We Are One: The Obama Inaugural Celebration at the Lincoln Memorial	George Stevens Jr., Michael Stevens, and Sara Lukinson	HBO

=== 2010s ===
Year	Program	Writer(s)	Network
2010 (63rd)
2010 (63rd)	**National Memorial Day Concert 2010**	**Joan Meyerson**	**PBS**
2010 (63rd)	Jimmy Kimmel Live: After the Academy Awards	Tony Barbieri, Jonathan Bines, Will Burke, Gary Greenberg, Sal Iacono, Jimmy Kimmel, Jonathan Kimmel, Jacob Lentz, Molly McNearney, Bryan Paulk, Rick Rosner	ABC
2010 (63rd)	The Simpsons 20th Anniversary Special – In 3-D! On Ice!	Jeremy Chilnick, Morgan Spurlock	Fox
2011 (64th)
2011 (64th)	**Jimmy Kimmel Live: After the Academy Awards**	**Gary Greenberg, Molly McNearney, Tony Barbieri, Jonathan Bines, John N. Huss, Sal Iacono, Eric Immerman, Jimmy Kimmel, Jonathan Kimmel, Jacob Lentz, Danny Ricker, Richard G. Rosner**	**ABC**
2011 (64th)	TheKennedy Center Honors	Lewis Friedman, Sara Lukinson, Michael Stevens, George Stevens Jr.	CBS
2012 (65th)
2012 (65th)	**66th Tony Awards**	**Dave Boone, Paul Greenberg, David Javerbaum, Adam Schlesinger**	**CBS**
2012 (65th)	27th Independent Spirit Awards	Billy Kimball, Wayne Federman	IFC
2012 (65th)	Jimmy Kimmel Live: After the Academy Awards	Gary Greenberg, Molly McNearney, Tony Barbieri, Jonathan Bines, Sal Iacono, Eric Immerman, Jimmy Kimmel, Jeffrey Loveness, Bryan Paulk, Danny Ricker, Richard G. Rosner	ABC
2012 (65th)	National Memorial Day Concert	Joan Meyerson	PBS
2013 (66th)
2013 (66th)	**Blake Shelton's Not So Family Christmas**	**Jay Martel, Ian Roberts, Alex Rubens, Charlie Sanders**	**NBC**
2014 (67th)
2014 (67th)	**71st Golden Globe Awards**	**Barry Adelman, Alex Baze, Dave Boone, Robert Carlock, Tina Fey, Jon Macks, Sam Means, Seth Meyers, Amy Poehler, Mike Shoemaker**	**NBC**
2014 (67th)	68th Tony Awards	Dave Boone, Jon Macks	CBS
2014 (67th)	2014 Film Independent Spirit Awards	Gerry Duggan, Wayne Federman, Patton Oswalt, Erik Weiner	IFC
2014 (67th)	Bill Maher: Live from D.C.	Bill Maher	HBO
2014 (67th)	Sarah Silverman: We Are Miracles	Sarah Silverman	HBO
2015 (68th)
2015 (68th)	**Jimmy Kimmel Live!: 10th Annual After The Oscars Special**	**Jack Allison, Tony Barbieri, Jonathan Bines, Joelle Boucai, Greg Dorris, Gary Greenberg, Josh Halloway, Sal Iacono, Eric Immerman, Jimmy Kimmel, Bess Kalb, Jeff Loveness, Molly McNearney, Danny Ricker, Joe Strazzullo, Bridger Winegar**	**ABC**
2015 (68th)	Amy Schumer: Live at the Apollo	Amy Schumer	HBO
2015 (68th)	69th Tony Awards	Dave Boone, Adam Goldman and Carol Leifer	CBS
2015 (68th)	2014 Kennedy Center Honors	Lewis Friedman, Sara Lukinson, Nell Scovell, George Stevens Jr., Michael Stevens	CBS
2015 (68th)	2015 Film Independent Spirit Awards	Benji Aflalo, Wayne Federman, Marika Sawyer, Frank Sebastiano, Erik Weiner	IFC
2015 (68th)	Saturday Night Live 40th Anniversary Special	James Anderson, Fred Armisen, Tina Fey, Steve Higgins, Chris Kelly, Erik Kenward, Rob Klein, Seth Meyers, Lorne Michaels, John Mulaney, Paula Pell, Andy Samberg, Akiva Schaffer, Tom Schiller, Sarah Schneider, Marc Shaiman, Michael Shoemaker, Robert Smigel, Emily Spivey, Kent Sublette, Jorma Taccone, Bryan Tucker	NBC
2016 (69th)
2016 (69th)	**Triumph's Election Special**	**Andy Breckman, Josh Comers, Rajan Desai, David Feldman, R. J. Fried, Jarrett Grode, Ben Joseph, Matthew Kirsch, Michael Koman, Mike Lawrence, Brian Reich, Craig Rowin, Robert Smigel, Zach Smilovitz, David Taylor, Andrew Weinberg, Ray James, Jesse Joyce, Jason Reich, Alex Scordelis**	**Hulu**
2016 (69th)	68th Primetime Emmy Awards	Jack Allison, Tony Barbieri, Jonathan Bines, Joelle Boucai, Robert Cohen, Gary Greenberg, Josh Halloway, Sal Iacono, Eric Immerman, Jimmy Kimmel, Bess Kalb, Jeff Loveness, Jon Macks, Molly McNearney, Danny Ricker, Jeff Stilson, Joe Strazzullo, Alexis Wilkinson	ABC
2016 (69th)	88th Academy Awards	Dave Boone, Billy Kimball, Scott Aukerman, Rodney Barnes, Neil Campbell, Matthew Claybrooks, Lance Crouther, Mike Ferrucci, Langston Kerman, Jon Macks, Steve O'Donnell, Nimesh Patel, Vanessa Ramos, Chris Rock, Frank Sebastiano, Chuck Sklar, Jeff Stilson, Michelle Wolf	ABC
2016 (69th)	73rd Golden Globe Awards	Barry Adelman, Dave Boone, Ricky Gervais, Jon Macks, Matthew Robinson	NBC
2017 (70th)
2017 (70th)	**39th Kennedy Center Honors**	**Dave Boone**	**CBS**
2017 (70th)	89th Academy Awards	Billy Kimball, Jon Macks, Jack Allison, Tony Barbieri, Jonathan Bines, Joelle Boucai, Gonzalo Cordova, Gary Greenberg, Josh Halloway, Sal Iacono, Eric Immerman, Bess Kalb, Jimmy Kimmel, Jeff Loveness, Molly McNearney, Danny Ricker, Joe Strazzullo	ABC
2017 (70th)	AFI Life Achievement Award: A Tribute to Diane Keaton	Bob Gazzale, Jon Macks	TNT
2017 (70th)	Michael Bolton's Big, Sexy Valentine's Day Special	Scott Aukerman, Dave Ferguson, Mike Hanford, Tim Kalpakis, Joe Saunders, Akiva Schaffer, Zach Kanin, Claudia O'Doherty, Tim Robinson	Netflix
2017 (70th)	Nathan For You: A Celebration	Leo Allen, Nathan Fielder, Carrie Kemper, Michael Koman, Adam Locke-Norton, Eric Notarnicola	Comedy Central
2018 (71st)
2018 (71st)	**The Fake News with Ted Nelms**	**John Aboud, Andrew Blitz, Michael Colton, Ed Helms, Elliott Kalan, Joseph Randazzo, Sara Schaefer**	**Comedy Central**
2018 (71st)	2018 Rose Parade Hosted by Cord & Tish	Will Ferrell, Jake Fogelnest, Andrew Steele	Prime Video
2018 (71st)	Drew Michael Stand-Up Special	Drew Michael	HBO
2018 (71st)	The Oscars 2018	Dave Boone, Carol Leifer, Jon Macks, Megan Amram, Tony Barbieri, Jonathan Bines, Joelle Boucai, Gonzalo Cordova, Adam Carolla, Devin Field, Gary Greenberg, Josh Halloway, Sal Iacono, Eric Immerman, Jesse Joyce, Bess Kalb, Jimmy Kimmel, Molly McNearney, Danny Ricker, Joe Strazzullo	ABC
2019 (72nd)
2019 (72nd)	**Full Frontal with Samantha Bee Presents: Not the White House Correspondents' Dinner Part 2**	**Melinda Taub, Joe Grossman, Nicole Silverberg, Samantha Bee, Kristen Bartlett, Pat Cassels, Sean Crespo, Mike Drucker, Mathan Erhardt, Miles Kahn, Sahar Rizvi, Allison Silverman**	**TBS**
2019 (72nd)	Desi Lydic: Abroad	Devin Delliquanti and Lauren Sarver	Comedy Central
2019 (72nd)	The Late Late Show Carpool Karaoke Primetime Special 2019	Lauren Greenberg, Ian Karmel, Demi Adejuyigbe, James Corden, Rob Crabbe, Lawrence Dai, Nate Fernald, Caroline Goldfarb, John Kennedy, James Longman, Jared Moskowitz, CeCe Pleasants, Tim Siedell, Benjamin Stout, Tom Thriveni, Louis Waymouth, and Ben Winston	CBS
2019 (72nd)	Ramy Youssef: Feelings	Ramy Youssef	HBO

=== 2020s ===
Year	Program	Writer(s)	Network
2020 (73rd)
2020 (73rd)	**Stephen Colbert's Election Night 2020: Democracy's Last Stand: Building Back America Great Again Better 2020**	**Ariel Dumas, Jay Katsir, Delmonte Bent, Michael Brumm, River Clegg, Aaron Cohen, Stephen T. Colbert, Nicole Conlan, Paul Dinello, Glenn Eichler, Django Gold, Gabe Gronli, Barry Julien, Michael Cruz Kayne, Eliana Kwartler, Matt Lappin, Felipe Torres Medina, Opus Moreschi, Asher Perlman, Tom Purcell, Kate Sidley, Brian Stack, John Thibodeaux, Steve Waltien**	**Showtime**
2020 (73rd)	30 Rock: A One-Time Special	Tina Fey, Robert Carlock	NBC
2020 (73rd)	Father of the Bride Part 3(ish)	Nancy Meyers	YouTube
2020 (73rd)	Yearly Departed	Bess Kalb, Karen Chee, Akilah Green, Franchesca Ramsey, Jocelyn Richard	Prime Video
2021 (74th)
2021 (74th)	**Full Frontal Wants to Take Your Guns**	**Kristen Bartlett, Samantha Bee, Pat Cassels, Sean Crespo, Mike Drucker, Miles Kahn, Chris Thompson, Holly Walker, Allison Silverman, Joe Grossman, Sahar Rizvi, Michael Rhoa**	**TBS**
2021 (74th)	43rd Annual Kennedy Center Honors	Dave Boone	CBS
2021 (74th)	Drew Michael: Red Blue Green	Drew Michael	HBO
2021 (74th)	The Tony Awards Presents: Broadway's Back!	Dave Boone, Amber Ruffin, Marc Shaiman, Daniel J. Watts, Scott Wittman	CBS
2021 (74th)	Yearly Departed	Bess Kalb (head writer); Karen Chee, Akilah Green, Franchesca Ramsey, Jocelyn Richard (writers)	Prime Video
2022 (75th)
2022 (75th)	**Jerrod Carmichael: Rothaniel**	**Jerrod Carmichael**	**HBO/HBO Max**
2022 (75th)	The National Memorial Day Concert 2022	Kirk Ellis, Jon Macks (writers); Rita Brent (special material)	PBS
2022 (75th)	Stand Out: An LGBTQ+ Celebration	Matt Roberts, Beth Sherman (head writers); Rita Brent, Page Hurwitz, Carey O’Donnell (writers); Guy Branum, Chris Sartinsky, Louis Virtel (special material)	Netflix
2022 (75th)	The Problem with Jon Stewart: Election Wrap-Up Special	Kristen Acimovic (head writer); Henrik Blix, Rob Christensen, Jay Jurden, Alexa Loftus, Tocarra Mallard, Robby Slowik, Maria Randazzo, Jon Stewart, Kasaun Wilson (writers)	Apple TV+
2023 (76th)
2023 (76th)	**Sarah Silverman: Someone You Love**	**Sarah Silverman**	**HBO/Max**
2023 (76th)	Adam Sandler: The Kennedy Center Mark Twain Prize for American Humor	Jon Macks, Rita Brent, Jeff Stilson, Meggie McFadden	CNN
2023 (76th)	Carol Burnett: 90 Years of Laughter + Love	Jon Macks, Carol Leifer	NBC
2023 (76th)	Marc Maron: From Bleak to Dark	Marc Maron	HBO/Max
