= Bess Kalb =

American television writer

- Born: Bess Bell Kalb; New York City
- Education: Brown University
- Occupations: Author; television writer
- Writing career
- Genre: Comedy
- Website: www.besskalb.com

Bess Kalb is an American Emmy Award-nominated writer for the Jimmy Kimmel Live! television show and journalist with The New Yorker magazine. She is the author of the best-selling book Nobody Will Tell You This But Me: A True (As Told to Me) Story, which recounts the life of her grandmother, Bobby Bell.

== Early life ==
Kalb was raised in Manhattan and Westchester. She later moved to San Francisco, California where she contributed articles to Wired, GQ.com, The New Republic, GOOD, Salon.com and other publications. In 2012, Kalb moved to Los Angeles to begin a comedy career.

== Career ==
Kalb began writing comedy for Jimmy Kimmel Live! in 2012; the show airs on the ABC Network. In addition, she wrote for the 2012 Primetime Emmy Awards ceremony with Kimmel as the host.

In 2013, she was nominated for the Emmy Award for Outstanding Writing for a Variety Series for her work alongside the rest of the writing team of Jimmy Kimmel Live! including Tony Barbieri, Jonathan Bines, Joelle Boucai, Gary Greenberg, Sal Iacono, Eric Immerman, Josh Halloway, Jimmy Kimmel, Jeff Loveness, Molly McNearney, Bryan Paulk, Danny Ricker and Rick Rosner.

Three years later, with Kimmel once again hosting the Primetime Emmy Awards, Kalb was part of the writing team. Her work with Jimmy Kimmel Live! earned her a Writers Guild of America Award for Television: Comedy-Variety Talk Series that year as well.

Working with Hillary Clinton, Kalb wrote for the Senator's Al Smith Dinner speech in February 2016.

On May 28, 2017, Kalb's politically-themed tweets gained the attention of President Donald Trump, who blocked her account from his Twitter feed.

In 2018, Kalb did a stand-up comedy routine introducing Hillary Clinton at a fundraiser for Moms Demand Action for Gun Sense and then-candidate Lucy McBath (now a congresswoman).

On March 17, 2020, Kalb released her first book, Nobody Will Tell You This But Me: A True (As Told to Me) Story, from Knopf. The book tells the story of her grandmother, Bobby Bell, from her own mother's migration from Russia, her birth on a kitchen table in a Brooklyn tenement, to her life in upscale New York suburbs of Westchester to her death at age 90. Kalb adds her own comedic observations of their relationship from their conversations and voicemails.

Nobody Will Tell You This But Me was ranked No. 8 on the American Booksellers Association Indie Bestseller Hardcover Non-Fiction list.

The audiobook is narrated by the author and produced by Random House Audio.

The film rights for the book were optioned by Sight Unseen Pictures, with Elizabeth Chomko (What They Had) set to direct. Kalb will write the screenplay.
