= The Cannell Studios =

American television production company

- Type: Private
- Industry: Television production
- Founded: 1979; 47 years ago
- Founder: Stephen J. Cannell
- Headquarters: Los Angeles, California, United States
- Owner: New World Entertainment (1995-1997); News Corporation (1997-1998)

The Cannell Studios (formerly Stephen J. Cannell Productions and Cannell Entertainment, Inc.) is an independent television production company founded in 1979 after Stephen J. Cannell left Universal Television.

The company is notable for The Greatest American Hero, The A-Team, Hunter and Silk Stalkings.

== History ==
=== Origins ===
Stephen J. Cannell was a prominent writer who was employed at Universal Television for nearly a decade. While at Universal, he created shows such as The Rockford Files and Baretta, both of which were massive moneymakers for the networks ABC and NBC, respectively.

While still at Universal, he created Baa Baa Black Sheep, Richie Brockelman, Private Eye, The Duke and Stone.

=== Early years as independent company ===
In 1979, Stephen J. Cannell left Universal and founded an independent production company of his own, initially based at Paramount Studios, with the capital of American attorney Ken Ziffren. Furthermore, Paramount Television initially held international distribution rights to the new company's early shows.

The company's first show was Tenspeed and Brown Shoe on ABC, which was a ratings flop, followed by The Greatest American Hero, which gained a minor success, was also on ABC, and lasted three seasons. Other Universal Television employees joined Cannell as well, including writers Juanita Bartlett and Frank Lupo, and supervising producer Jo Swerling Jr., as well as college intern Patrick Hasburgh, thus growing the employment base of the new company. In 1982, The Greatest American Hero was followed by The Quest, which was created by Juanita Bartlett, but also lasted only one season.

It was when The Greatest American Hero started production that the company spawned its iconic signature production logo, created by Linda Stewart of Cannell's public relations department, partially as an attempt to counter Cannell's developing perception in the press as a "TV mogul", which he was uncomfortable with. The logo consists of Stephen J. Cannell typing on a typewriter using his IBM Selectric, throwing his paper and forming a "C".

=== Breakout success ===
The company's true turning point was The A-Team, which was co-produced with Universal Television under a contractual obligation fulfilled by the company after his exit from Universal in 1979 and aired on NBC for five seasons, from 1983 to 1987, instantly turning Cannell into a powerhouse and regaining NBC's ratings dominance since its ratings slump in the late 1970s.

Also in 1983, Cannell sold the syndication rights to The Greatest American Hero to Syndivision, which initially sub-licensed the series to LBS Communications. Eventually, Syndivision was sold to Lorimar Productions in 1985. The company's success allowed Cannell to move his operations to larger facilities in Hollywood Boulevard in 1983.

The success followed with Hardcastle and McCormick, another blockbuster sensation that aired on ABC for three seasons, from 1983 to 1986. He followed it up with The Rousters, airing on NBC in 1983, but did not fare well, and it was followed by another NBC series, Riptide, which lasted for three seasons from 1984 to 1986, but had a modest following. The company's biggest success was Hunter, which starred Fred Dryer, was another blockbuster success and aired from 1984 to 1991, becoming its longest-running TV series.

In September 1985, Cannell sold North American syndication rights to Hardcastle and McCormick and Riptide to Columbia Pictures Television, outbidding Paramount Television and 20th Century Fox Television.

=== Expansion ===
In 1986, the company expanded when it, along with Tri-Star Pictures and Witt/Thomas Productions, co-founded a television syndication firm called TeleVentures. In late 1988, Witt/Thomas Productions backed out of the TeleVentures venture and entered a distribution deal with Walt Disney Television.

On July 11, 1990, both Tri-Star and Cannell dissolved the TeleVentures joint venture, and Cannell formed Cannell Distribution Co.

Also in 1986, with the favorable exchange rate between the US and Canadian dollars being a win/win for US producers, Cannell decided to shoot his new series, Stingray (1985–1987) in Toronto. However, so many producers were shooting in Toronto that no crews were available to staff any additional productions. Consequently, Cannell shot the first seven episodes of Stingray's second season in Calgary with the remaining eight episodes being shot in Vancouver. His first series to entirely be shot in Vancouver was 21 Jump Street (1987–1991), the highest-rated show of the new Fox network's first season.

The company ended up operating an office in Vancouver in 1988 under North Shore Studios, used to film and tape programming. In 1989, the company ended up expanding its footprint by acquiring television stations under Cannell Communications, it owned WHNS-TV in 1989, WUAB in 1990 and KPDX in 1992. Cannell then sold WHNS-TV and KPDX to First Media Television in 1994, and then leased WUAB to Malrite Communications in 1994, before being sold to Raycom Media in 2000 due to strict FCC regulation.

In 1990, the company made its foray into first-run syndication by moving 21 Jump Street from Fox to first-run syndication in association with LBS Communications. The company then moved to direct syndication with Street Justice in 1991, followed by Renegade in 1992, which was an instant syndicated success. Also in 1991, Cannell decided to produce his next big show for CBS and USA Network, Silk Stalkings, which ended up surpassing Hunter as his longest-running show. Around that year, Cannell teamed up with ABC to produce another television series, The Commish, which was another hit.

In 1991, it expanded to game shows by partnering with Rick Rosner on Personals for CBS, followed by Caesar's Challenge for NBC. In 1995, Cannell launched a reality show for syndication, called U.S. Customs Classified, which was about actual footage and recreations to depict cases.

=== Sale of programs and end of production ===
On July 31, 1995, New World Communications acquired his Cannell Entertainment production company and Cannell Distribution was then folded into Genesis Entertainment. Cannell then founded The Cannell Studios. One of the first shows produced by the newly established Cannell Studios was the corporate drama Profit (1996). The final new show developed by Cannell was the weekly syndicated series Two, which was for first-run syndication.

In 1997, New World Communications was sold to News Corporation and became part of 20th Century Fox Television. However, two of Cannell's series, The A-Team and Hunter were controlled by two other studios: Universal Television and Sony Pictures Television, respectively, and were not part of the deal. Additionally, Cannell would pay Fox for international and domestic sales for his series.

On May 4, 1998, Cannell reacquired his library from Fox and regained all distribution rights to the series. In 2003, the company signed a deal with StudioWorks Entertainment to release the television series Wiseguy on DVD. In 2004, the company had signed a deal with Anchor Bay Entertainment to release its shows on DVD.

On January 24, 2006, The Carsey-Werner Company acquired distribution rights to Cannell's library. In 2009, the company had signed a deal with Mill Creek Entertainment to release its shows on DVD. In 2010, Stephen J. Cannell died. In March 2020, the Cannell estate signed a worldwide distribution deal with Shout! Factory.

== List of programs ==
=== Universal Television (1976-1979) ===
These programs were denoted by the term "A Stephen J. Cannell Production", followed by the Universal Television logo.

==== Television shows ====
Title	Original run	Network	Notes
Baa Baa Black Sheep	1976-1978	NBC	
Richie Brockelman, Private Eye	1978	NBC	co-production with Bucky Productions, Inc.
The Duke	1979	NBC	mini-series
Stone	1980	ABC	co-production with Gerry Productions

==== Television movies/pilots ====
Title	Air date	Network	Notes
Dr. Scorpion	February 24, 1978	ABC	
The Chinese Typewriter	March 3, 1979	CBS	
The Night Rider	May 11, 1979	ABC	
Nightside	June 8, 1980	ABC	co-production with Glen A. Larson Productions

=== As an independent company (1979-present) ===
==== Television shows ====
Title	Original run	Network	Notes
Tenspeed and Brown Shoe	1980	ABC	
The Greatest American Hero	1981-1983	ABC	first series with the company's logo.
The Quest	1982	ABC	
The A-Team	1983-1987	NBC	co-production with Universal Television
Hardcastle and McCormick	1983-1986	ABC	
Riptide	1984-1986	NBC	
Hunter	1984-1991	NBC	
The Last Precinct	1986	NBC	
Stingray	1986-1987	NBC	
21 Jump Street	1987-1991	Fox/Syndication	co-production with Patrick Hasburgh Productions (seasons 1-2) and LBS Communications (season 5)
Wiseguy	1987-1991	CBS	
J.J. Starbuck	1987	NBC	
Sonny Spoon	1988	NBC	co-production with NBC Productions
Unsub	1989	NBC	
Top of the Hill	1989	CBS	
Booker	1989-1990	Fox	
Broken Badges	1990	CBS	
The 100 Lives of Black Jack Savage	1991	NBC	co-production with Walt Disney Television
Street Justice	1991-1993	Syndication	
Silk Stalkings	1991-1999	CBS/USA Network	co-production with Stu Segall Productions, New World Entertainment (seasons 5-6) and 20th Century Fox Television (seasons 6-8)
The Commish	1991-1996	ABC	co-production with Three Putt Productions, ABC Productions and New World Entertainment (season 5)
Palace Guard	1991	CBS	
Personals	1991-1992	CBS	co-production with Rosner Television
The Hat Squad	1992-1993	CBS	
Renegade	1992-1997	Syndication/USA Network	co-production with Stu Segall Productions, Renegade IV Enterprises and New World Entertainment (season 5)
Caesars Challenge	1993-1994	NBC	co-production with Rosner Television
Missing Persons	1993-1994	ABC	co-production with Gary Sherman Productions
Cobra	1993-1994	Syndication	
Traps	1994	CBS	co-production with CBS Entertainment Productions
Hawkeye	1994-1995	Syndication	
Marker	1995	UPN	
U.S. Customs Confessional	1995-1996	Syndication	co-production with Grab Productions and New World Entertainment
Profit	1996	Fox	co-production with Greenwalt/McNamara Productions and New World Entertainment
Two	1996-1997	Syndication	co-production with Two Television Productions, Telegenic Programs Inc. and New World Entertainment
Hunter	2003	NBC	co-production with Stu Segall Productions, NBC Studios and 20th Century Fox Television

==== Television movies/specials/pilots ====
Title	Air date	Network	Notes
Midnight Offerings	February 27, 1981	ABC	
Brothers-in-Law	April 28, 1985	ABC	
Destination America	April 3, 1987	ABC	
Scandals	October 29, 1988	ABC	co-production with Garen/Albrecht Productions
Livin' Large	April 29, 1989	ABC	co-production with Grio Entertainment Group
Thunberboat Row	September 10, 1989	ABC	
I Love You Perfect	October 10, 1989	ABC	co-production with Gross-Weston Productions and Susan Dey Productions
Always Remember I Love You	December 23, 1990	CBS	co-production with Gross-Weston Productions
The Great Pretender	April 14, 1991	NBC	
Living a Lie	September 16, 1991	NBC	co-production with Bernhardt-Friestat Entertainment
Highway Heartbreaker	March 29, 1992	CBS	co-production with Gross-Weston Productions
Jonathan: The Boy Nobody Wanted	October 19, 1992	NBC	co-production with Gross-Weston Productions
Firestorm: 72 Hours in Oakland	February 7, 1993	ABC	co-production with Gross-Weston Productions and Capital Cities/ABC Video Enterprises
A Place for Annie	May 1, 1994	ABC	co-production with Gross-Weston Productions, Hallmark Hall of Fame and Signboard Hill Productions
Greyhounds	June 24, 1994	CBS	co-production with Stu Segall Productions
Jake Lassister: Justice on the Bayou	January 9, 1995	NBC	co-production with Big Productions and Spanish Trail Productions
The Return of Hunter: Everyone Walks in L.A.	April 30, 1995	NBC	co-production with Fred Dryer Productions
A Child is Missing	October 1, 1995	CBS	co-production with Moore-Weiss Productions and New World Entertainment
The Surrogate	October 22, 1995	ABC	co-production with Moore-Weiss Productions and New World Entertainment
Wiseguy	May 2, 1996	ABC	co-production with Stu Segall Productions and New World Entertainment
Them	October 8, 1996	UPN	co-production with Deluxe Vancouver and New World Entertainment

==== Movies ====
Title	Release date	Distributor	Notes
The A-Team	June 11, 2010	20th Century Fox	co-production with Dune Entertainment, Top Cow Productions and Scott Free Productions
21 Jump Street	March 16, 2012	Sony Pictures Releasing	as SJC Studios; co-production with Columbia Pictures, Original Film, Metro-Goldwyn-Mayer Pictures and Relativity Media
22 Jump Street	June 13, 2014	Sony Pictures Releasing	co-production with Columbia Pictures, Original Film, Metro-Goldwyn-Mayer Pictures, Storyville, 75 Year Plan Productions, MRC and LStar Capital
