= Cleto Escobedo III =

American bandleader (1966–2025)

- Escobedo performing on Jimmy Kimmel Live!

Background information
- Born: Cleto Valentine Escobedo III; August 23, 1966; Las Vegas, Nevada, U.S.
- Died: November 11, 2025 (aged 59) Los Angeles, California, U.S.
- Genres: Jazz; funk; rock
- Occupations: Bandleader; musician
- Instruments: Tenor saxophone; alto saxophone; soprano saxophone
- Years active: 1985–2025
- Formerly of: Cleto and the Cletones
- Education: University of Nevada, Las Vegas

Cleto Valentine Escobedo III (August 23, 1966 – November 11, 2025) was an American musician and bandleader. He led Cleto and the Cletones, the house band for Jimmy Kimmel Live!, appearing on the show from its inception in 2003 until his death in 2025. Escobedo began his career touring with Paula Abdul and Marc Anthony before joining the late-night show.

== Early life ==
Escobedo was born on August 23, 1966, in Las Vegas, Nevada, to Cleto Escobedo Jr. and Sylvia Escobedo. His father, a musician who also worked as a valet for entertainers such as Sammy Davis Jr. and Tom Jones, set aside his career to raise his son, then later appeared in his son's band on Jimmy Kimmel Live! At his mother's suggestion, Escobedo learned to play the saxophone from his father. After high school, he attended the University of Nevada, Las Vegas, where he performed with several jazz bands. He initially pursued a degree in political science but took a semester off to become a full-time musician.

Escobedo had known Jimmy Kimmel since the two were around nine years old; they first met in 1977, when Kimmel's family moved to Las Vegas, across the street from Escobedo. They both attended Guinn Junior High School, and their friendship developed. As children, the pair often stayed up late watching Late Night with David Letterman together.

== Career ==
After briefly attending University of Nevada, Las Vegas, Escobedo joined the band Santa Fe (later Santa Fe and The Fat City Horns).

Before joining Jimmy Kimmel on his late-night show, Escobedo performed across Las Vegas. In 1991, he toured with Paula Abdul in support of her album Spellbound. He subsequently became a member of Cecilia Noël and the Wild Clams. In 2003, while on tour with Marc Anthony, Escobedo was invited to join Kimmel on Jimmy Kimmel Live!, having previously worked with him on the Comedy Central series The Man Show. The request came at an opportune time, as Escobedo had been considering leaving music before receiving the offer.

=== The Cletones ===
The Cletones, formerly Cleto and the Cletones, is the American house band on the ABC-TV late-night television program, Jimmy Kimmel Live! (since 2003). Escobedo formed Cleto and the Cletones and performed on Jimmy Kimmel Live! from its inception until his death. He grew up as a neighbor of host Jimmy Kimmel in Las Vegas.

In 2003, he co-wrote the show's theme song with Kimmel's brother, Jonathan, and Les Pierce. During his time on the show, Escobedo collaborated with musicians including Jimmy Vivino of Late Night with Conan O'Brien and Paul Shaffer, bandleader of Late Night with David Letterman. He also joined other late-night television musicians in advocating for networks to pay musicians for appearances on YouTube.

They appeared on the seventh episode of the I Love Music Podcast with Jen Fodor.

The band's name was changed to the Cletones following Escobedo's death.

== Personal life and death ==
Escobedo lived in Studio City, Los Angeles, with his wife Lori and their two children.

Escobedo died at UCLA Medical Center on November 11, 2025, at the age of 59, following several months of illness. Kimmel announced Escobedo's death on social media and eulogized him in that evening's monologue. He announced on that night's show that he would take two nights off to mourn. Escobedo's cause of death was revealed to be cardiogenic shock, in turn caused by complications from a liver transplant, with disseminated intravascular coagulation and alcoholic cirrhosis of the liver listed as contributing factors.

== Discography ==
=== Studio albums ===
- Cleto (1995) – promo
- Los Blues Volume One Cleto The Cletones Jimmy Kimmel – LP
