= Harry Friedman =

American television industry executive (born 1946)

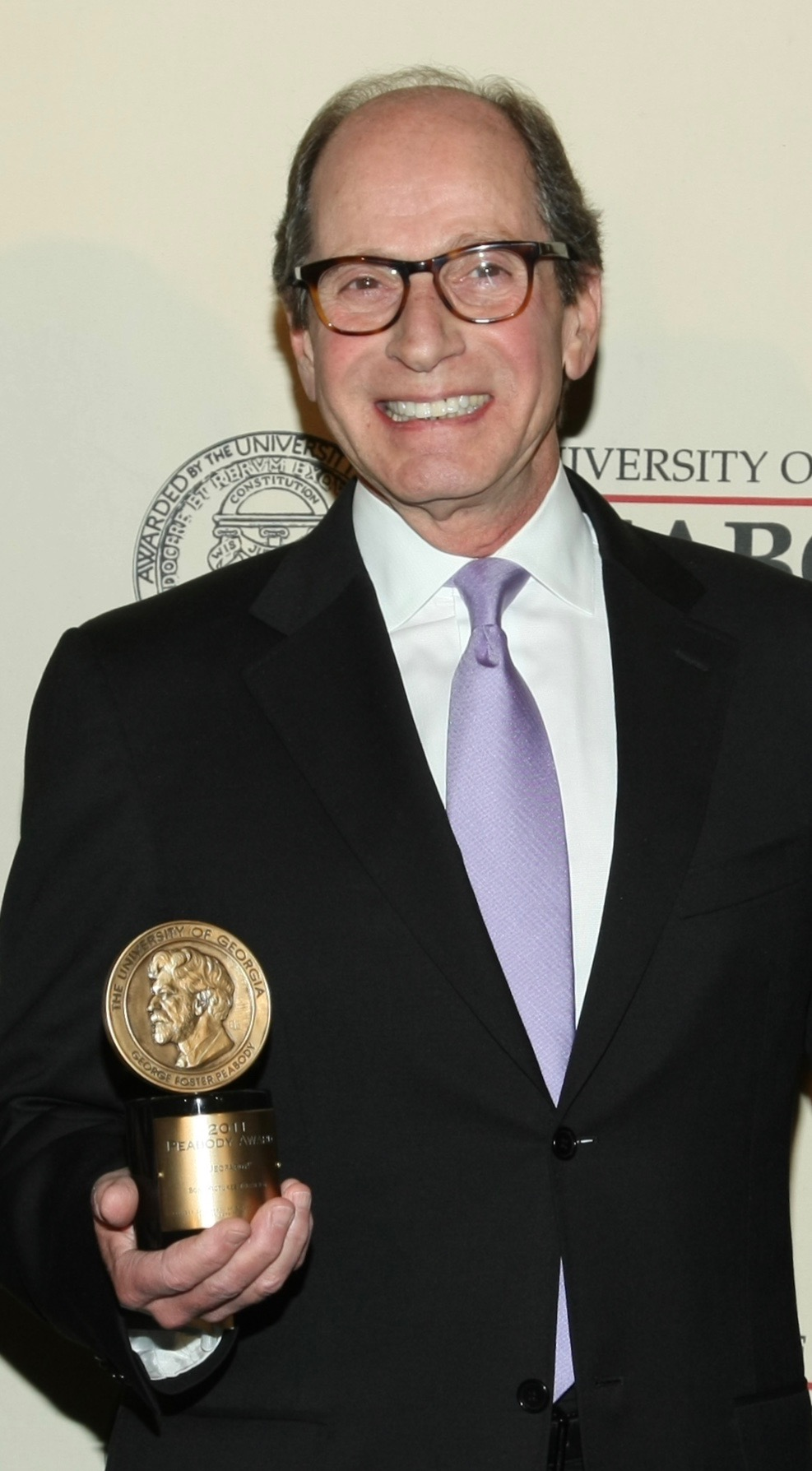
- Friedman in 2012, holding the Peabody Award received for Jeopardy!
- Born: November 12, 1946 (age 80); Omaha, Nebraska, U.S.
- Education: University of Nebraska–Lincoln
- Occupation: Television producer
- Years active: 1971–present
- Known for: Executive producer on Jeopardy! and Wheel of Fortune
- Spouse: Judy Friedman (m. 1973)
- Children: 2

Harry Friedman (born November 12, 1946) is an American television industry executive. He was the executive producer of the syndicated game shows Jeopardy! and Wheel of Fortune from 1999 to 2020. Initially he shared the title of executive producer with the shows' creator, Merv Griffin, but from Griffin's 2000 retirement until his own 2020 retirement, he served as their sole executive producer.

Friedman has produced a combined total of more than 5,500 episodes of Jeopardy! and Wheel of Fortune. Friedman introduced a number of new gameplay elements, theme weeks, and technological advances to both programs, and in 2006 he led both shows to make television history by becoming the first syndicated television series to broadcast in high definition.

In September 2021, it was reported Friedman will be executive producer for a proposed NBC revival of the game show Tic Tac Dough with Tom Bergeron as host. The show, however, was not picked up.

On April 28, 2022, it was confirmed Friedman will be the executive producer for the second season of another NBC game show revival, Capital One College Bowl, which ran until October 28, 2022.

== Life and career ==
Friedman was born in Omaha, Nebraska. He developed an early fascination with television programming and personalities, including Johnny Carson when he was a young local celebrity. Long before the conception of student internships, Friedman began working for Omaha's first television stations, doing whatever work management permitted. He attended the University of Nebraska–Lincoln.

In 1971, Friedman moved to Los Angeles, and without contacts he gave himself six months to find a job in the business. With less than 24 hours remaining on his self-imposed deadline, Friedman became a part-time question writer on the TV game show The Hollywood Squares, and continued with that show for eleven years, writing and producing thousands of episodes for three different versions of the show. He was also involved in the development of such other programs as Gambit and High Rollers.

=== Sony Pictures Television ===
==== Wheel of Fortune ====
Friedman became a producer of Wheel of Fortune in 1995. During his tenure with the show, Friedman attempted to keep the show's gameplay fresh and exciting with many new additions to the rules. The new gameplay elements and rule modifications that were introduced to Wheel during Friedman's tenure, in chronological order based on their times of introduction, include the progressive cash jackpot wedge (in 1996), Toss-Up puzzles (in 2000), the increase of the bonus round's top value from its previous $25,000 to $100,000 (in 2001), the replacement of said round's former "W-H-E-E-L" prize envelope holder with the current Bonus Wheel (also in 2001), the Mystery wedges (in 2002), the Prize Puzzle (in 2003), the Wild Card (in 2006), localizing the million dollar wedge from the Australian version into the U.S. (in 2008), the replacement of the long-standing Free Spin token with the Free Play wedge (in 2009), the ½ Car tags (in 2011), and most recently, retiring the jackpot wedge in favor of the new Express wedge (in 2013).

Friedman was responsible for many of Wheel's digital extensions, including the launch of the show's official website, and the development of video games based on the show for Sony's PlayStation consoles and Nintendo's Wii. He also conceived adaptations of the show for the iPhone, the iPad, and other electronic devices.

A major technological advancement initiated by Friedman was the introduction of a new, highly sophisticated set in 2003. This set incorporates an LED and glass light extension, as well as a modernized puzzle board first introduced in 1997 with LCD screens that can be touched by the hostess (Vanna White throughout Friedman's tenure) to make letters appear.

The show's "Wheel Watchers Club", the first-ever, long-term, online viewer loyalty program in television history (now totaling over 5.7 million members), and its extension, the "SPIN I.D." program, were both developed by Friedman. Additionally, he conceptualized the "Wheelmobile," a mobile touring vehicle used by the show to conduct contestant search events across the United States.

==== Jeopardy! ====
Upon adding producer duties for Jeopardy! in 1997, Friedman broadened the program's scope by expanding the list of categories and adding clues reflecting popular culture. He also introduced a variety of special tournaments, starting with the 1997 International Tournament taped in Stockholm, Sweden, which was the only tournament to be taped outside the U.S. He oversaw the doubling of the prize money available in each round of play in November 2001; the dollar amounts for the Jeopardy! Round increased from $100-$500 to $200-$1,000, and Double Jeopardy!'s clue values increased from $200-$1,000 to $400-$2,000. For the show's 4000th episode in 2002, he also produced the Million Dollar Masters Tournament taped at Radio City Music Hall in New York City, which reunited 15 former Jeopardy! champions.

For the show's 20th season in 2003, Friedman lifted not only Jeopardy!'s cap on the returning champions' total winnings, but also the long-standing five-day limit on the number of episodes on which they could appear. His implementation of this rule change allowed champions to continue making an indefinite number of appearances on the program and amassing winnings as long as they remained victorious, leading the way for Ken Jennings, at the time a software engineer from Salt Lake City, Utah, to win on 74 consecutive Jeopardy! programs (losing on his 75th) and amass a record total of $2,520,700, breaking almost every game show record in the history of American television. The quiz show's viewership increased by 30 percent during the streak, and it often out-performed even prime-time programs to become one of the most talked-about shows in the United States. In 2005, in response to Jennings' tremendous success on the show, Friedman also produced the Ultimate Tournament of Champions, in which 145 former champions played for a top prize of $2,000,000; Jennings, seeded as the only automatic finalist, pocketed $500,000 when he came in second to Brad Rutter, who won the top prize, with Jerome Vered placing third and collecting $250,000.

Friedman continued to add new Jeopardy! formats, such as the 2009-2010 Million Dollar Celebrity Invitational, in which 27 players from past Celebrity Jeopardy! matches returned to compete, with Michael McKean winning one million dollars for his charity; and, in 2011, both the inaugural Teachers' Tournament and the IBM Challenge, in which IBM's computer system Watson defeated both Jennings and Rutter.

In the late 1990s, Friedman participated with Scott Sternberg in the conception of two spin-offs of Jeopardy!: a music-intensive version called Rock & Roll Jeopardy! which aired on the VH1 network from 1998 to 2001, and a kids' version called Jep! which aired on the Game Show Network for one season from 1998 to 1999.

===== Clue Crew =====
In 2001, Friedman played an instrumental role in the formation of Jeopardy!'s "Clue Crew", a team of roving correspondents who traveled the world showcasing clues accompanied by video for the show's home viewers. By 2011, the team had traveled to 200 cities worldwide, through 45 of the 50 U.S. states, and to 33 foreign countries.

Friedman's explanation of the reasoning behind the team's creation was as follows:

TV is a visual medium, and the more visual we can make our clues, the more we think it will enhance the experience for the viewer.

The Clue Crew from 2019 to 2022 consisted of Sarah Whitcomb Foss and Jimmy McGuire, both original members of the team. In the past, they also included Kelly Miyahara (from 2005 to 2019), Sofia Lidskog (from 2001 to 2004), Cheryl Farrell (from 2001 to 2008), and Jon Cannon (from 2005 to 2009). When shows are filmed, Foss serves as the show's in-studio announcer for early sessions, while McGuire is the host of practice games.

The Clue Crew was disbanded at the end of the show's 38th season after Foss and McGuire became, respectively, a producer and a stage manager for the show.

===== Internet =====
Friedman played a very active role in the show's official website, which receives over 400,000 visitors per month.

==== Pyramid ====
Friedman was the executive consultant for the 2002–04 version of Pyramid, which by that time was property of Sony Pictures Television.

=== Other work ===
Friedman produced the 1993–1994 game show Caesars Challenge for Rick Rosner and Stephen J. Cannell's production companies. His other writing and producing credits include network primetime specials such as American Yearbook for CBS, documentaries such as Nova on PBS, and home video. He has also worked over the years with such other television production companies as FOX, Dick Clark Productions, Buena Vista Television, ABC, Orion Television, Laurel Entertainment, Vin Di Bona Productions, A&E Network, Krofft Productions, and Four Star Productions.

Friedman is a member of the Writers Guild of America, West and the Academy of Television Arts and Sciences.

=== Retirement from Wheel of Fortune and Jeopardy! ===
On August 1, 2019, Sony Pictures Television announced that Friedman would retire as executive producer of both Jeopardy! and Wheel of Fortune following the 2019–20 season, despite the COVID-19 pandemic cutting his last television season short. He was succeeded by Mike Richards. The origins of his retirement plans began when he was hospitalized in April 2018 for 30 days for a series of three abdominal surgeries, which were life-threatening episodes, in which he made a full recovery.

=== NBC Projects ===
In 2021, NBCUniversal appointed Friedman to be the executive producer for a proposed revival of the game show Tic Tac Dough with Tom Bergeron as host, and in April 2022, was named executive producer for the second season of NBC's Capital One College Bowl revival.

== Personal life ==
Friedman lives in Los Angeles with his wife Judy (married since 1973), and they have two daughters, Amy (married to Dax Shelby) and Leslie (a personal trainer living in Denver), and one granddaughter, Ayla Marin Shelby.

== Awards and honors ==
Since Friedman joined Jeopardy!, the show has come to receive the most awards and honors of any syndicated game show in television history. As of 2020, the program has won a total of 43 Daytime Emmy Awards in the following categories: Outstanding Show, Outstanding Game/Audience Participation Show, Outstanding Special Class Writing, Outstanding Game Show Host, and Outstanding Directing For A Game/Audience Participation Show.

Friedman has won fourteen Emmy Awards, the most won by a game show producer. In January 2007, the National Association of Television Program Executives honored him with its prestigious "Brandon Tartikoff Legacy Award", and, in October of that same year, Broadcasting & Cable inducted him into its Hall of Fame.

On September 29, 2022, Friedman was inducted into the inaugural class of the Jeopardy! Hall of Fame at the 1st Jeopardy! Honors event.
