= Yearly Departed =

Comedy television specials

Yearly Departed is a series of year-in-review stand-up comedy streaming television specials featuring solely women performers, created by Bess Kalb. The specials, framed as a series of eulogies at a funeral for the year, were distributed by Prime Video. Two specials were produced and released for 2020 and 2021.

The first edition was released on December 29, 2020, and featured Phoebe Robinson as host; eulogies delivered by Tiffany Haddish, Rachel Brosnahan, Ziwe Fumudoh, Patti Harrison, Natasha Leggero, Natasha Rothwell, and Sarah Silverman; and a performance of "I Will Remember You" by Christina Aguilera.

The 2021 edition was released on December 23, 2021, and is hosted by Yvonne Orji, with eulogies delivered by Jane Fonda, X Mayo, Aparna Nancherla, Chelsea Peretti, Dulcé Sloan, and Megan Stalter, and a musical performance by Alessia Cara.
