= The Duke (miniseries) =

- Genre: Drama
- Created by: Stephen J. Cannell
- Directed by: Lawrence Doheny; Dana Elcar
- Starring: Robert Conrad; Larry Manetti; Red West; Patricia Conwell; Ed O'Bradovich
- Theme music composer: Mike Post; Pete Carpenter
- Country of origin: United States
- Original language: English
- No. of seasons: 1
- No. of episodes: 5

Production
- Executive producer: Stephen J. Cannell
- Production locations: Chicago, Illinois, United States
- Running time: 48 mins.
- Production companies: Stephen J. Cannell Productions; Universal Television

Original release
- Network: NBC
- Release: April 5 – May 18, 1979

The Duke is an American television miniseries that aired on NBC from April 5 to May 18, 1979.

== Overview ==
The Duke follows an aging boxer who became a private investigator. This Chicago, Illinois-set series starred Robert Conrad as Oscar "Duke" Ramsey; Conrad was actually a professional fighter in his own early years.

The executive producer was Stephen J. Cannell, and the show was produced by Stephen J. Cannell Productions, in association with Universal TV.

== Cast ==
- Robert Conrad as Oscar "Duke" Ramsey
- Larry Manetti as Joe Cadillac
- Red West as Sergeant Mick O'Brien
- Patricia Conwell as Duke's friend, Dedra
- Ed O'Bradovich as Eddie, the bartender at Duke and Benny's Corner, the tavern Ramsey owns.

== Episodes ==
| No. | Title | Original release date |
|---|---|---|
| 1 | "Up Against the Odds" | April 5, 1979 |
| 2 | "Blues for the Duke" | April 13, 1979 |
| 3 | "The Zoo under the Wacker Street Bridge" | April 20, 1979 |
| 4 | "Long and Thin, Lorna Lynn" | April 27, 1979 |
| 5 | "Nothin' 'Cept Noise" | May 18, 1979 |
