= Jack Allison =

American writer, podcaster, and comedian

- Occupations: Writer; Podcaster; Comedian

Jack Allison (born February 18, 1986) is an American writer, podcaster, and comedian. He is the co-author of Kill The Rich with Kate Shapiro, and former co-host of Struggle Session with Leslie Lee III and JackAM with Cait Raft. He formerly wrote for Jimmy Kimmel Live! He later made news for feuding with Michael Che and other writers of Saturday Night Live. He also trained, taught, performed, and wrote at the Upright Citizens Brigade.

== Bibliography ==
- Kill the Rich (co-authored with Kate Shapiro). September 12, 2023. Published by CLASH Books. ISBN 9781955904858
