= Lottery! =

1983 American television series

- Genre: Drama anthology
- Created by: Rick Rosner
- Written by: Hindi Brooks; Don Bullock; Tony DiMarco; Rudy Dochtermann; David Engelbach; David Gerber; Peggy Goldman; Bruce Kalish; Stephen Kendal; David Ketchum; S.A. Long; Lee Philips; Duane Poole; Ton Swale
- Directed by: Don Chaffey; Barry Crane; Georg Fenady; Lawrence Levy; Vincent McEveety; Barbara Peters; Lee Philips; James Sheldon; Mike Vejar; Virgil W. Vogel; Don Weis
- Starring: Ben Murphy; Marshall Colt
- Theme music composer: Elizabeth Bradley; James P. Dunne
- Opening theme: "Turn of the Cards" performed by Alan Graham
- Composers: Ken Heller; Mark Snow; Michael Melvoin
- Country of origin: United States
- Original language: English
- No. of seasons: 1
- No. of episodes: 17

Production
- Executive producer: Rick Rosner
- Producers: Robert Janes; Robert Lovenheim
- Camera setup: Single-camera
- Running time: 45–48 minutes
- Production companies: Rosner Television; Orion Television

Original release
- Network: ABC
- Release: September 9, 1983 – June 14, 1984

Lottery! is an American drama anthology series that premiered on ABC on September 9, 1983. The series aired for one season of 17 episodes and starred Ben Murphy as Patrick Sean Flaherty, and Marshall Colt as Eric Rush. Lottery! centered on ordinary people who have won the lottery—all of a sudden becoming millionaires—and how it changes their lives.

== Synopsis ==
Each week, several guest stars become instant millionaires (in two or three different stories) when their lottery tickets bring them fame, fortune, and usually trouble. Flaherty worked for the "Intersweep Lottery." His job was to find the winner(s), inform them of their winnings, and give him or her an envelope containing $5,000 in cash, and a check worth millions. In the event of ownership disputes with the winning ticket, Flaherty would also act as an arbitrator responsible for determining the true recipient in what method used to settle the matter.

Rush was Flaherty's partner, an IRS agent who oversaw the accounting of the payouts and the arrangement of the winner's tax obligations. Each episode also took place in a different city around the country.

The opening titles for the show featured large banks of computers and tape drives. Above what appeared to be a trading floor (similar to what one would see at a stock exchange) were large electronic toteboards showing the latest prizes, the winners's names, and the countries in which they lived. At the end of every episode, the show displayed the following disclaimer:

"The Intersweep Lottery is purely fictitious. Except for states where they are legally authorized, lotteries in this country are illegal."

The Intersweep Lottery itself was actually more akin to the Publishers Clearing House than any of the popular lottery games in the U.S. and around the world, such as the Irish Sweepstakes, which was believed to have given Rosner the idea for the series. Participants in this lottery purchased numbered tickets. Each ticket carried a unique serial number consisting of two letters followed by six numbers. The drawing of winning numbers was also never featured in any of the episodes in this series.

Lottery! is not the first series to deal with the elation and challenges of sudden wealth. The basic premise is loosely similar to an earlier series, The Millionaire with Marvin Miller, except that the money was given out by a mysterious benefactor, John Beresford Tipton, to specific named individuals without the organization of a lottery, and that any taxes on the money had already been paid in advance. In 1979, NBC produced Sweepstakes, an equally short-lived series with a similar premise; it, too, lasted only a single season. In 2006, NBC tried again with Windfall, a series about a group of twenty friends winning a multimillion-dollar lottery prize; that series lasted only three months before cancellation.

== US television ratings ==
Viewership and ratings per season of Lottery!
| Season | Episodes | First aired | Last aired | TV season | Viewership rank |
|---|---|---|---|---|---|
| 1 | 17 | September 9, 1983 | June 14, 1984 | 1983-84 | 77 |

== Episodes ==
| No. | Title | Directed by | Written by | Original release date |
|---|---|---|---|---|
| 1 | "San Francisco: Being a Winner" | Lee Philips | David Engelbach | September 9, 1983 |
| 2 | "Los Angeles: Bigger Volume" | Barry Crane | Peggy Goldman | September 16, 1983 |
| 3 | "Denver: Following Through" | James Sheldon | Stephen Kandel | September 23, 1983 |
| 4 | "Detroit: The Price of Freedom" | Mike Vejar | Story by : Linda Elstad; Teleplay by : Rudy Dochtermann | September 30, 1983 |
| 5 | "Phoenix: Blood Brothers" | Lawrence Levy | David Ketchum & Tony DiMarco | October 7, 1983 |
| 6 | "Portland: Treasure Hunt" | Don Chaffey | Rudy Dochtermann | October 21, 1983 |
| 7 | "Kansas City: Protected Winner" | Vince McEveety | Story by : Craig Buck and Duane Poole & Tom Swale; Teleplay by : Duane Poole & Tom Swale | October 28, 1983 |
| 8 | "Charleston: The Spenders" | Barbara Peters | Story by : Bud Freeman and David Garber & Bruce Kalish; Teleplay by : Hindi Brooks and David Garber & Bruce Kalish | November 4, 1983 |
| 9 | "New York: Winning Can Be a Murder" | Virgil W. Vogel | S.A. Long and Duane Poole & Tom Swale | November 18, 1983 |
| 10 | "Houston: Duffy's Choice" | James Sheldon | Story by : J.J. Farber; Teleplay by : Don Balluck | November 25, 1983 |
| 11 | "Boston: False Illusion" | Don Weis | Ronnie Wenker-Konner | December 9, 1983 |
| 12 | "Chicago: Another Chance" | James Sheldon | Duane Poole & Tom Swale | March 1, 1984 |
| 13 | "San Diego: Bingo!" | Georg Fenady | David Braff | March 8, 1984 |
| 14 | "Miami: Sharing" | Mike Vejar | Austin Kalish | March 15, 1984 |
| 15 | "St. Louis: Win or Lose" | Barry Crane | Hindi Brooks | March 22, 1984 |
| 16 | "Honolulu: 3-2=1" | James Sheldon | Duane Poole & Tom Swale | March 29, 1984 |
| 17 | "Minneapolis: Six Months Down" | Peter Crane | Rudy Dochtermann | June 14, 1984 |

== Awards and nominations ==
| Year | Award | Result | Category | Recipient |
|---|---|---|---|---|
| 1984 | Young Artist Awards | Nominated | Best Young Actor, Guest in a Television Series | Corey Feldman |
