= Jonathan Kimmel =

American writer, director and producer (born 1976)

- Born: Jonathan Francis Kimmel; November 4, 1976 (age 49)
- Occupations: Television and film director; writer; producer; actor; composer
- Years active: 2001–present
- Spouse: Carly Hirsch (m. 2006)
- Children: 2
- Relatives: Jimmy Kimmel (brother); Frank Potenza (uncle); Sal Iacono (cousin); Martha Stewart (cousin)

Jonathan Francis Kimmel (born November 4, 1976) is an American television and film director, writer, producer, actor, and composer.

== Early life ==
Kimmel was born on November 4, 1976, the youngest of the three children of Joan (née Iacono) and James John Kimmel, who worked at American Express and was an IBM executive. Kimmel's mother is of Italian descent; her grandparents migrated to the United States from Ischia, Naples after the 1883 earthquake. Two of his paternal great-great-grandparents were German immigrants. His family's surname was Kümmel ('caraway' in German) several generations back. According to a DNA test, Kimmel is also of partial Albanian descent.

== Career ==
Kimmel's writing credits include six seasons of South Park, during which the show won three Emmy Awards and a Peabody Award. He has also contributed several voice-overs for South Park, including the voice of Peter the Family Guy, Gandalf, John Travolta, the Israeli Egg Assassin, and his brother Jimmy in the "Fishsticks" episode. After that, he served as co-executive producer and head writer for MTV's The Andy Milonakis Show. Additionally, he assisted on Crank Yankers, where he was also a composer and voice-over performer. Other writing credits include: That's My Bush!, Drawn Together, and The Bonnie Hunt Show.

Kimmel's performing credits include: SXSW feature The Prank starring Rita Moreno, ABC's Trophy Wife ABC's Life with Bonnie; the character Xavier on the ABC pilot "Let Go"; the voice of Scab in Disney's The Wild; the Singing Ass in Sarah Silverman's Jesus Is Magic; the voice of the King on Drawn Together; the Boneologist and as The Fog on Minoriteam, as well as dozens of voices and characters on Jimmy Kimmel Live!. Kimmel has also guest-starred in several roles on The Sarah Silverman Program. He directed the music video for The Killers' ninth charity Christmas single, "Joel the Lump of Coal", which features his brother Jimmy (who also co-wrote the song).

Kimmel is executive producer, director and showrunner on the reboot of Crank Yankers, for Comedy Central.

Kimmel is executive producer and co-showrunner of the Kelly Ripa hosted Generation Gap, for ABC.

== Personal life ==
Kimmel married his wife Carly Hirsch on August 12, 2006. Together they have two children, a son, Wesley Kimmel (b. 2009) who is also an actor and a daughter, Beatrix (b. 2012).

== Filmography ==
=== Film ===
Year	Title	Role	Notes
2006	The Wild	Scab (voice)	
2008	Imaginationland: The Movie	Additional voices (voice)	Direct-to-video
2022	The Prank	Joe	

=== Television ===
Year	Title	Role	Notes
2001	That's My Bush!	The Gut Busters!	Episode: "A Poorly Executed Plan"
2003–2007	Crank Yankers	Sonny; Jon the Businessman (voices)	2 episodes
2004	Life with Bonnie	Xavier	Episode: "Nightshift"
2004–2005	Drawn Together	The King (voice)	Credited as Jon Kimmel; Episodes: "Dirty Pranking Number 2" & "Ghosteses in the Slot Machine"
2005–2009, 2023–present	South Park	Peter Griffin; Jimmy Kimmel; various (voices)	13 episodes Credited as Juan Kimmelini
2006	Minoriteam	Boneologist; various (voices)	Episodes: "Tribe & Prejudice" & "FOG"
2006	Let Go	Xavier	Television movie
2007	Saul of the Mole Men	Dr. Lawrence "Brad" Perkins; Molemen (voices)	9 episodes
2007–2008	The Sarah Silverman Program	Pageant host; Bob; Homeless Blind Willy Joe	3 episodes
2008–2018	Jimmy Kimmel Live!	Writer; segment director	
2014	Trophy Wife	Farmer Rick	Episode: "Mother's Day"
2019–2021	Crank Yankers	Executive producer; director; showrunner	40 episodes
2022	Generation Gap	Executive producer; co-showrunner	10 episodes
