= Caesars Challenge =

American television game show

- Genre: Game show
- Created by: Michael Dubelko; Rick Rosner
- Directed by: Steve Grant
- Presented by: Ahmad Rashad
- Starring: Dan Doherty; Chad Brown; Zach Ruby
- Announcer: Steve Day
- Theme music composer: Stormy Sacks
- Country of origin: United States
- No. of episodes: 155

Production
- Executive producer: Rick Rosner
- Producer: Harry Friedman
- Production locations: Caesars Palace, Las Vegas
- Running time: 30 minutes
- Production companies: Rosner Television; Stephen J. Cannell Productions

Original release
- Network: NBC
- Release: June 14, 1993 – January 14, 1994

Caesars Challenge is an American game show that aired on NBC from June 14, 1993, to January 14, 1994, and was recorded at the Circus Maximus Theatre of Caesars Palace in Las Vegas, Nevada. Ahmad Rashad hosted the series and, in keeping with the theme of the show's location, he was assisted by a man dressed as a Roman gladiator. Dan Doherty played the role for most of the show's run, with Chad Brown and Zach Ruby handling the earliest episodes before Doherty joined the show.

The show was a co-production of Rosner Television and Stephen J. Cannell Productions, and was the only game show that was produced by the latter company.

== Gameplay ==
=== Main Game ===
Three contestants competed in three rounds, attempting to solve scrambled words up to nine letters in length that were displayed on an onstage slot machine.

Rashad asked a series of multiple-choice trivia questions, for which any contestant could buzz in and answer. A correct response awarded money, allowed the contestant to place one letter in its correct position, and gave him/her five seconds to guess the word. If a contestant missed a question, either opponent could buzz in and try to steal; a second miss gave the money, letter, and guess to the last contestant by default. Solving the word awarded additional money for each letter that had not yet been placed.

Each word and series of questions fit a specific category, which was initially revealed to the contestants before play began. Later, the category was shown only to the home audience, and Rashad did not disclose it to the contestants until after the word had been solved.

Questions and unplaced letters were worth $100 each in the first round, $200 in the second, and $300 in the third. One position in each word was designated as a "Lucky Slot"; if a contestant placed a letter there and immediately solved the word, he/she won a bonus in addition to the money for the unplaced letters. The bonus (referred to as the "Instant Jackpot") started at $500 each day, increased by this amount for every word in which it went unclaimed, and reset to $500 after it was won.

Two words were played in each of the first two rounds (seven-letter words in the first round, eight-letter words in the second), while the third round continued until time was called (with all words nine letters in length). If a word was in progress at the end of the third round, the Lucky Slot was removed from play and the remaining letters were put in place one at a time until someone buzzed-in and guessed the word, scoring $300 per unplaced letter. An incorrect guess locked the contestant out of the word. If time was called after a word was completed, one final word was played under these same rules.

The high scorer became the day's champion and advanced to the bonus round. Originally, the champion bought prizes with his/her accumulated money; later, he/she received a prize package of equivalent value to the cash total. The other two contestants received parting gifts, including dinner at Caesars and tickets for one of its headlining acts at the time. In the event of a tie, one last speed-up word was played between the tied contestants to determine the winner.

=== Bonus round ===
In the bonus round, the champion was given an opportunity to win a new car. Two different formats were used.

==== First format ====
A giant rotating cage similar to a bingo calling machine was lowered from the ceiling. Inside were 200 plastic balls, each marked with a letter of the alphabet; one ball at a time was dispensed into a chute, and Rashad's assistant called out its letter. A backstage computer kept track of the letters and searched for any valid nine-letter words that could be formed from them. Once such a word was found, the drawing ended, and the letters in the word were displayed to the champion in the order that they were drawn. He/she was allowed to place one letter in its correct position for every main-game victory up to that point, then had 10 seconds to guess the word; successfully doing so won the car.

Champions remained on the show until they either won the car or were defeated in the main game, whichever came first.

When Caesars Challenge first premiered, letters were only drawn once the bonus round had started. To save time, the format was later changed to begin the drawing just before the start of the final commercial break and complete it once the show resumed. All drawn letters were shown to the champion and the audience.

==== Second format ====
The second bonus format was introduced on November 22, 1993, and continued for the remainder of the run.

The champion was shown five scrambled words, each a different length from five to nine letters, on a screen placed in front of the slot machine. He/she had 30 seconds to solve the words, starting with the shortest and working upward by length. The current word was unscrambled, one letter at a time, until the champion solved it. No passing was allowed; the champion had to solve each word before moving to the next and there was no penalty for a wrong guess. He/she won the car for unscrambling all five words.

Under this format, champions remained on the show until they either won the car, lost the main game, or played the bonus round three times.

=== Audience game ===
During the closing credits of every show, Rashad and his assistant moved through the audience, carrying a bowl filled with silver dollars, Caesars Palace casino chips, and chocolate medallions wrapped in gold foil. They chose one audience member at a time to unscramble a five-letter word; each person who did so was allowed to take one handful from the bowl.

== Development ==
During development, the show was known as Illusions and was intended for first-run syndication (and continued to be offered by Cannell Distribution into 1993, though only one station, KCAL-TV in Los Angeles, picked the show up); the pilot episode was taped in October 1992. Elements of the game and certain set pieces were repurposed from the unsold 1990 pilot of the US version of the popular UK game show Countdown.

== Broadcast History ==
Caesars Challenge replaced Scattergories on NBC's daytime schedule when it premiered on June 14, 1993, and inherited its timeslot of 12:30 pm Eastern, following the reruns of Classic Concentration, which had moved to 12:00 pm from a half-hour earlier. Most NBC affiliates would not air Caesars Challenge at its scheduled time due to their continuing practice of airing other syndicated programming at 12:30 pm; this resulted in some NBC stations airing the show in a different spot on their schedule while others did not air it at all, often relegating it to independent stations in some media markets. In the markets that did air Caesars Challenge at its scheduled time, the show faced off against Loving on ABC and the first half-hour of The Young and the Restless on CBS but did not perform well enough against either soap opera. On December 31, 1993, NBC returned the 12:30 pm timeslot to its affiliates and moved the show to 12:00 pm three days later, replacing the Classic Concentration reruns, in a short, but failed, attempt for it to compete against local programming on other network affiliates. Still, as a result, NBC cancelled Caesars Challenge after thirty-one weeks of episodes and aired its last episode on January 14, 1994. Its place in the schedule was then taken over three days later by the NBC debut of The Jane Whitney Show, which originally premiered in national syndication in 1992; the show occupied the 11:00 am hour, which resulted in NBC returning the 12:00 pm timeslot to its affiliates once again, (Note: NBC, however, would take back the 12:00 pm hour from its affiliates on January 6, 1997 when Sunset Beach premiered, but like Caesars Challenge and all other shows before it, Sunset Beach would also suffer from the noon timeslot, despite a long three season run. After that show ended on December 31, 1999, NBC permanently returned the 12:00 pm hour to its affiliates.) but its time on the network lasted only nine months, ending its entire run in September 1994.

To date, Caesars Challenge is the last daytime game show ever to be aired on NBC, and the last new daytime game show format to air on any of the Big Three television networks. (Note: Only one new game show, a revival of Let's Make a Deal on CBS in 2009, has debuted in network daytime since Caesars Challenge was cancelled.)

== Record holder ==
Neil Bines, who bills himself as one of the best anagrammers in the world, appeared on the show in 1993 and set the show's performance records, solving more nine-letter words than any other episode, and winning $20,700 in prizes in the main game and the car in the bonus round.

== Reruns ==
Reruns aired on the USA Network from June 27 to November 4, 1994.

== International versions ==
Israel–Kasino Olami ("Global Casino") was hosted by Michal Zoharetz and was broadcast by Reshet.

== See also ==
- List of television shows set in Las Vegas
