= Sal Iacono =

American comedian (born 1971)

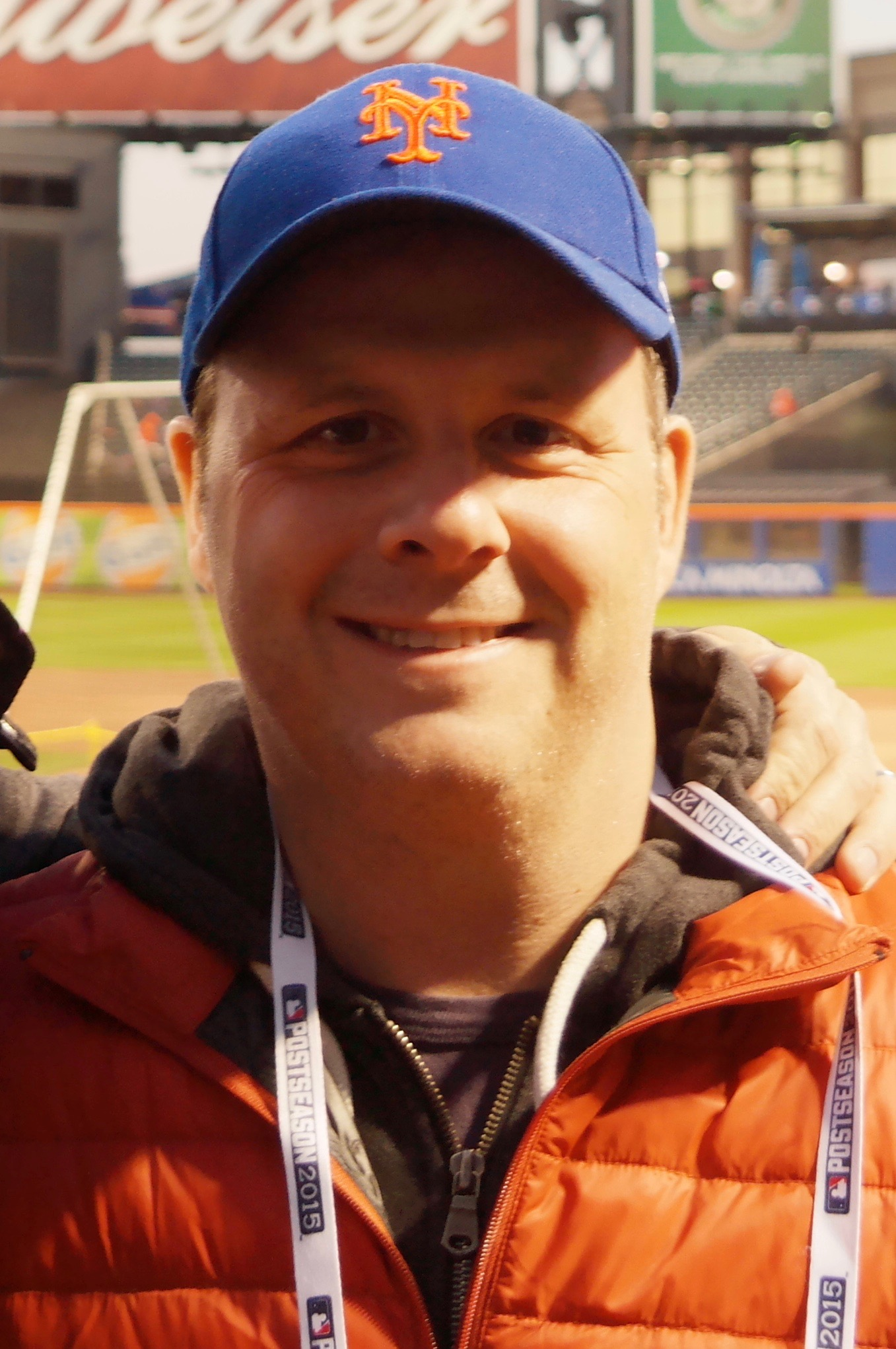
- Iacono at Citi Field in 2015
- Born: Salvatore Iacono; July 5, 1971 (age 55); Brooklyn, New York, U.S.
- Other name: Cousin Sal
- Education: State University of New York at Oswego (BA); Touro University (JD)
- Spouse: Melissa Iacono
- Children: 3
- Relatives: Jimmy Kimmel (cousin); Jonathan Kimmel (cousin); Micki Marseglia (cousin)

Sal Iacono (born July 5, 1971), also known as Cousin Sal, is an American comedian, writer, podcaster, and game show host. He is known for his roles on The Man Show and the late night television show Jimmy Kimmel Live!. He is Jimmy Kimmel's cousin, hence his nickname Cousin Sal.

== Early life ==
Iacono was born in Brooklyn to Fran Iacono and Vincent Iacono. He graduated from Elwood-John Glenn High School in 1989 and attended SUNY Oswego, earning a degree in Public Justice in 1993.

He went on to study law at Touro Law Center in Huntington, New York on Long Island, receiving his Juris Doctor in 1996. In 1997, Iacono moved from Long Island to Hollywood to pursue a career in television.

== Career ==
=== Television writing and hosting ===
Iacono's first foray into television writing was on the Fox Sports program Sports Geniuses, a sports-themed game show starring Matt Vasgersian on which Sal also appeared nightly in a trivia challenge. From there, he joined the writing staff of Comedy Central's The Man Show starring Adam Carolla and Iacono's cousin Jimmy Kimmel. In 2002, Iacono joined Kimmel during his weekly prognostication sketches on Fox NFL Sunday. Iacono wrote for the puppet show Crank Yankers.

When Win Ben Stein's Money co-host Nancy Pimental left the show in 2002, Iacono replaced her, becoming Ben Stein's co-host and comic tormentor. Iacono was the co-host through the rest of the run of the series and was nominated for an Emmy Award in the Outstanding Game Show Host category.

=== Jimmy Kimmel Live! ===
Iacono has been a permanent member of the Jimmy Kimmel Live! writing staff since 2003. He also appears frequently on the show in comedy sketches. These comedy bits are often shot using a hidden camera, and "Cousin Sal" either helps Jimmy prank their aunt Chippy or he pretends to be a store employee or delivery person who is incredibly inept or annoying. Cousin Sal's victims are invariably dumbfounded or become extremely infuriated, much to the delight of the viewing audience.

=== WWE ===
On Jimmy Kimmel Live! on May 16, 2008, Iacono had a birthday cake delivered to Kimmel on air by his favorite wrestler Rowdy Roddy Piper. He and Piper were confronted by Santino Marella, who had the cake thrown on him and was attacked by Iacono. The following Monday, Marella (dressed as Piper) brought Iacono to the ring on Monday Night Raw to "apologize" to "Cousin Sal". The real Piper entered the ring and Marella got his own apology cake thrown on him and on his way back to the locker room, he challenged Iacono to a wrestling match, which Piper accepted on Iacono's behalf. The match took place at the Friday Night SmackDown! tapings in Los Angeles on June 6, 2008. Sal was accompanied to the ring by Kimmel and Piper, and won the match.

=== Podcasts ===
Iacono (as Cousin Sal) is a regular guest on The Bill Simmons Podcast, appearing on Sunday night episodes during the NFL season. The duo humorously recaps the day's games and competes in predicting the spreads for the next week's slate during the "Guess the Lines" segment. Iacono also joined the Adam Carolla Podcast on Mondays during the 2010 NFL season to discuss the previous day's games.

In May 2017, Iacono became host of the Against All Odds gambling podcast, part of Simmons' Ringer Podcast Network. The final episode was released on August 13, 2025, with Iacono announcing that the podcast had been cancelled by The Ringer. Iacono is currently the host of The Ringer Gambling Show, which also airs on FanDuel Sports Network.

In July 2020, Iacono debuted a new podcast called Extra Points with his friend Dave Dameshek as part of a newly formed sports gambling media company of the same name founded by Iacono.

=== Writing ===
Along with his appearances on Bill Simmons' podcast, Sal was also a regular columnist on Grantland.com, which was a sports and pop culture website formerly run by Simmons.

His book, You Can't Lose Them All was released in early 2021.

=== Fox Sports ===
Iacono was an analyst on the Fox Sports gambling show, Fox Bet Live from 2018 until its cancellation.

In 2002, Sal was a guest prognosticator with his cousin Jimmy Kimmel on Fox NFL Sunday. Starting in 2019, Iacono was the prognosticator for Fox NFL Thursday.

== Personal life ==
Iacono lives near Los Angeles with his wife, Melissa, and three sons. He has been an ardent Dallas Cowboys fan since he was a child, after his father brought him a jacket bearing the team's logo following a work trip.
