= Jimmy Kimmel Live! =

American late-night talk show

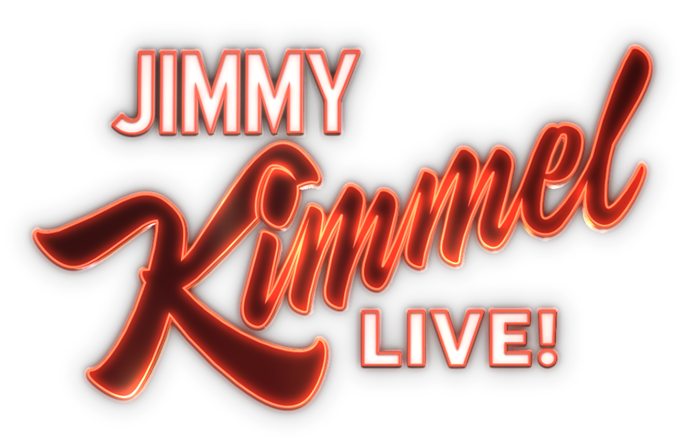
- Created by: Jimmy Kimmel
- Written by: Molly McNearney; Danny Ricker; Steve O'Donnell
- Directed by: Andy Fisher
- Presented by: Jimmy Kimmel (Note: The show has been temporarily hosted by other guests; for three episodes in May 2017, four from October to November 2017, four in December 2017, one in December 2019, one in March 2020, and 28 from July to September 2020. Recurring guest hosts include Kristen Bell, Anthony Anderson, David Spade, Billy Eichner, and Kerry Washington.)
- Starring: Guillermo Rodriguez; Sal Iacono
- Announcer: Andy Milonakis; Dicky Barrett; Lou Wilson
- Music by: The Cletones
- Opening theme: "Jimmy Kimmel Live!", sung by Robert Goulet
- Composers: Cleto Escobedo III; Les Pierce; Jimmy Kimmel; Jonathan Kimmel
- Country of origin: United States
- Original language: English
- No. of seasons: 25
- No. of episodes: 3,588

Production
- Executive producers: Jimmy Kimmel; Erin Irwin; Molly McNearney; Jennifer Sharron; David Craig; Jill Leiderman; Duncan Gray; Daniel Kellison; Sharon Hoffman
- Producers: Ken Crosby; Chris Fraticelli; David Craig; Tony Romero; Craig Powell; Patrick Friend; Nancy Fowkes
- Production location: El Capitan Entertainment Centre (2003–present)
- Camera setup: Multi-camera
- Running time: 40 minutes (Note: Most special episodes run for 30 minutes. From April to September 2020, regular episodes were reduced to 30 minutes in length due to the COVID-19 pandemic and Kimmel's hiatus. The third show of 2021 was also reduced to 30 minutes.)
- Production companies: Jackhole Productions (2003–2020); Kimmelot (2020–present); 20th Television (Note: Credited as Touchstone Television from 2003 until 2007, ABC Studios from 2007 until 2020, and ABC Signature from 2020 until 2024)

Original release
- Network: ABC
- Release: January 26, 2003 – present

Related
- The Dick Cavett Show; Politically Incorrect; The Man Show

Jimmy Kimmel Live! is an American late-night talk show, created and hosted by Jimmy Kimmel, and broadcast on the American Broadcasting Company (ABC). The nightly hour-long show tapes and is based at the El Capitan Entertainment Centre (ECEC), formerly the Hollywood Masonic Temple in Hollywood, Los Angeles, California. It debuted on January 26, 2003, as part of ABC's lead-out programming for Super Bowl XXXVII. For its first ten years, Jimmy Kimmel Live! aired at 12:05 a.m. ET/PT before moving to 11:35 p.m. on January 8, 2013.

Jimmy Kimmel Live! is produced by 12:05 AM Productions, LLC, in association with Kimmelot and 20th Television. Contrary to its title, the show has not regularly aired live since April 23, 2004, when censors were unable to properly bleep censor a barrage of swearing from actor Thomas Jane. It holds the title as the longest running late-night talk show on the network, having aired for more than three times as long as either The Dick Cavett Show (1969–1975) or Politically Incorrect (1997–2002). It is the second longest-running late-night talk show, by host, on any network surpassed only by The Tonight Show Starring Johnny Carson.

== History ==
After Politically Incorrect was cancelled in 2002, ABC decided to create a talk show following Nightline. Kimmel, who had co-hosted the Comedy Central sketch comedy show The Man Show was in negotiations as host in May 2002 and was publicly announced in November 2002. The show premiered on January 26, 2003. Because Nightline traditionally began at 11:35p.m. ET/PT, Jimmy Kimmel Live! (and Politically Incorrect before it) originally started after midnight.

Jimmy Kimmel Live! is ABC's first attempt at a traditional late-night talk show since its attempt to revive The Dick Cavett Show in the 1980s. ABC had earlier attempted to directly compete with NBC's The Tonight Show Starring Johnny Carson in the 1960s and 1970s with The Les Crane Show, which was more of a serious interview program than light entertainment, as well as The Joey Bishop Show (1967–1969), featuring Rat Pack member Joey Bishop with Regis Philbin as sidekick, and Jack Paar Tonite (1973) with Carson's predecessor as host of The Tonight Show.

Jimmy Kimmel Live! was stunted early on by an ABC affiliate body which was fulfilling existing syndication contracts for post-local news sitcom repeats and entertainment newsmagazines (thus delaying the show making the "Live!" title somewhat of a misnomer) and started behind the ratings of Late Show with David Letterman, The Tonight Show with Jay Leno, Late Night with Conan O'Brien, and The Late Late Show with Craig Kilborn, but gradually moved up in the ratings into 2004, and became a fairly strong competitor, capturing about half the audience of The Tonight Show with Jay Leno.

Nightline, which premiered in 1979 during the Iran hostage crisis, was able to compete with the Tonight Show, particularly on days when there were major news events or ongoing crises. The growth and development of cable news and the emergence of the internet and the 24-hour news cycle eroded Nightline's originally unique, and later preeminent position as a source for late evening national and international news and its value as a counterprogramming against Tonight and other late-night talk shows. As a result, on January 8, 2013, Jimmy Kimmel Live! switched places on ABC's schedule with Nightline. Since then, Jimmy Kimmel Live! at 11:35 p.m. has been able to more directly compete with the Tonight Show and CBS's The Late Show.

Following the subsequent retirements of Jay Leno in February 2014, David Letterman in May 2015, and Jon Stewart in August 2015, Kimmel became the second-longest serving current host in late-night television after Conan O'Brien. O'Brien's show ended in 2021, making Kimmel longest-tenured host. Overall, Kimmel is the third longest-running nightly late-night host on network television after David Letterman and Johnny Carson (Letterman hosted Late Night on NBC from 1982 to 1993 and Late Show on CBS from 1993 to 2015), and Jimmy Kimmel Live! is the second longest-running late-night show after The Tonight Show Starring Johnny Carson, which aired thirty consecutive seasons on NBC from 1962 to 1992.

On April 15, 2009, after the March sweeps break, Kimmel began broadcasting in 720p high definition.

Jimmy Kimmel Live increasingly became political satire, especially in the opening monologues, during the mid-2010s after Donald Trump ran for President of the United States. Kimmel cited issues close to him regarding the American health care system including his son's congenital heart defect and health insurance.

On August 15, 2019, ABC and the show were fined $395,000 via a settlement by the Federal Communications Commission (FCC) for misusing the Emergency Alert System (EAS) tone on the October 3, 2018, episode.

At the start of 2019, when Hearst Television's newest affiliation agreement for their ABC affiliates kicked in and forced them to give up their ability to delay the program for extended local newscasts or syndicated programming, the show now airs across the network on most stations at 11:35 p.m. ET/10:35 p.m. CT.

In May 2019, Kimmel and ABC agreed to extend his contract to host the show until 2022, which would be the show's twentieth season.

On March 16, 2020, the show suspended production due to the COVID-19 pandemic. Two weeks later, on March 30, the show resumed production from Kimmel's house, resuming its original 12:05 a.m. timeslot; Nightline returned to 11:35 p.m. On April 13, episodes were reduced to 30 minutes in length. Nightline moved to 12:05 a.m., followed by an encore of the 11:35 p.m. show.

On June 18, 2020, Kimmel announced he was taking a hiatus from the show to spend time with his family; a series of guest hosts filled in with 30-minute episodes until he returned with the new television season after hosting the 72nd Primetime Emmy Awards. This has since become a yearly tradition for the show's July and August shows under the more traditional hour format.

On September 21, 2020, Kimmel returned to the show, which also resumed taping from the Hollywood Masonic Temple without a studio audience, the show also resumed its 60-minute format, with Nightline returning to 12:35 a.m. In January 2021, pursuant to guidance from the Los Angeles County Department of Public Health due to a local increase in cases, the show briefly returned to its at-home format. The show has since returned to a full audience as restrictions were lifted, with the requirement that attendees have their full vaccinations.

On February 21, 2024, Kimmel hinted that he may not renew his contract for further seasons after his current contract expires in May 2026 in an interview with the Los Angeles Times, stating that "I think this is my final contract, I hate to even say it, because everyone's laughing at me now — each time I think that, and then it turns out to be not the case. I still have a little more than two years left on my contract, and that seems pretty good, that seems like enough." However, in December 2025, Kimmel announced that he had extended his contract by one additional year, with it set to expire in May 2027.

On November 11, 2025, Jimmy Kimmel announced via Instagram that friend Cleto Escobedo III, who served as the show's bandleader since its inception in 2003, had died that day.

=== 2025 suspension ===
On September 17, 2025, during an interview on conservative commentator Benny Johnson's podcast, FCC chair Brendan Carr warned that action could be taken against ABC for remarks by Kimmel during the monologue of the previous night's episode, in which he stated that the "MAGA gang" was "desperately trying to characterize this kid who murdered Charlie Kirk as anything other than one of them and doing everything they can to score political points from it."

Carr called Kimmel's comments "truly sick" and said his agency "has a strong case for holding Kimmel, ABC and network parent Walt Disney Co. accountable for spreading misinformation", arguing that Kimmel "appeared to be making an intentional effort to mislead the public that Kirk's assassin was a right-wing Trump supporter." Carr continued: "There's actions we can take on licensed broadcasters [that carry Jimmy Kimmel's show] and frankly, I think it's past time that a lot of these licensed broadcasters themselves push back on Comcast and Disney and say, 'Listen...we are not going to run Kimmel anymore until you straighten this out because we [are] running the possibility of fines or license revocations from the FCC.'" "When you see stuff like this—I mean, we can do this the easy way or the hard way. These companies can find ways to change conduct and take action, frankly, on Kimmel, or there's going to be additional work for the FCC ahead."

Nexstar Media Group and Sinclair Broadcast Group both announced after the warning that they would pull the show from its ABC affiliates indefinitely in response to Kimmel's comments. Shortly afterward, ABC announced that Jimmy Kimmel Live! would be suspended indefinitely; Nexstar stated that its original decision was made unilaterally and was not influenced by any correspondence with the FCC or other agencies, however, it was pointed out that Nexstar has been seeking FCC approval for the acquisition of fellow television broadcaster Tegna Inc.

Deadline reported that Kimmel had refused to apologize, but had planned to clarify his comments and specifically call out Trump supporters on that night's episode, and that ABC "hope[d] that it will be able to have Kimmel back on the air 'soon', per sources, but whether Kimmel himself is willing is also unclear." Variety described the suspension coming after "several prominent conservatives have called for any critic of [Kirk's] work to be silenced, no matter how nuanced the argument may be". CNN reported that Disney employees and Kimmel's staff received death threats following Carr's remarks and were doxxed on social media and that the safety of employees and advertisers was a consideration. However, Disney said they were reportedly "hopeful" that Kimmel's show will return.

Numerous figures and organizations called for a boycott of Disney to pressure them to reinstate Kimmel, such as Indivisible and 50501, and there was a spike in Google searches to cancel Hulu and Disney+, along with an increase of posts on Instagram, TikTok, Twitter, and multiple Reddit threads on the topic. A Change.org petition, which called for people to boycott "ABC's shows and affiliated streaming platforms," gained 60,000 signatures as of September 19. Writers Guild of America West organized a protest outside Walt Disney Studios located in Burbank, California on September 18. Writers Guild of America, East also protested outside the headquarters for ABC in New York City on September 19.

Donald Trump, JD Vance, Dave Portnoy, former Fox News host Megyn Kelly, The Daily Wire commentator Matt Walsh, and MAGA supporters backed Kimmel's suspension. On September 22, five days after the suspension and the aforementioned outcry, it was announced that Kimmel would return to the show the following night, though the show remained off the air on Nexstar and Sinclair affiliates. On September 26, media companies Sinclair Broadcast Group and Nexstar Media Group announced that they would restore the show on their affiliates that evening.

Disney said that the return of the show drew 6.26 million viewers, despite not being aired to 23% of households due to preemptions.

=== 2026 FCC scrutiny ===
In September 2026, Kimmel said that an interview with Democratic U.S. Senate candidate James Talarico would not air on ABC and would instead be released on YouTube, citing concerns about scrutiny from the Federal Communications Commission over political candidate appearances. Talarico's similar situation when interviewed on The Late Show with Stephen Colbert after FCC threats led to increased viewership of the interview that was referred to as an example of the Streisand effect, and according to Variety, Kimmel's interview with Talarico reached 5 million views in a span of 24 hours.

== Production ==
Contrary to its name, Kimmel has not aired live editions regularly since 2004; instead, it is recorded at 4:30 p.m. Pacific Time (7:30 p.m. Eastern) on the day of broadcast outside special episodes. The program switched to taped broadcasts after actor Thomas Jane guested and standards and practices was unable to easily bleep censor a sudden barrage of profanity from Jane to test their limits.

Until 2009, new episodes aired five nights a week, while from 2009 to 2012, the Friday episode was a rebroadcast of a recent episode. Starting with the January 2013 move, the Friday episode was retitled Jimmy Kimmel Live! This Week, showing highlights from the entire week of shows. However, the show has since reverted to airing a rebroadcast of a recent episode on Fridays, although current events have caused the show to occasionally air new Friday episodes.

On January 8, 2025, it was announced that Jimmy Kimmel Live! would suspend production due to the then-ongoing wildfires in the Southern California region, where El Capitan, the filming spot for the show, is located. On January 13, it was announced that the show would resume production at El Capitan effective immediately.

=== Talent ===
The show's house band is The Cletones. The current members of the band are Cleto Escobedo Jr. on tenor and alto saxophone, Jeff Babko on keyboards, Toshi Yanagi on guitar, Rhonda Smith on bass, and Jonathan Dresel on drums. The band's original bandleader was Escobedo's son, saxophonist Cleto Escobedo III, who was a childhood friend of Kimmel. The band was known as Cleto and the Cletones until Escobedo III's death; it was renamed The Cletones on November 17, 2025. Smith replaced Jimmy Earl after his 2022 retirement. Like other talk shows with live bands, The Cletones play the show's opening and closing themes and play into and out of commercial breaks. (They usually play through the entire break for the studio audience.) The show's opening theme was written by Les Pierce, Jonathan Kimmel, and Cleto Escobedo III and sung by Robert Goulet.

The show originally had guest co-hosts each week who would participate in skits and question each night's guests. Parking lot security guard Guillermo Rodriguez became the sidekick of the show after he was caught sleeping in announcer Dicky Barrett's car.

The show also featured guest announcers, until comedian Andy Milonakis took over as the show's announcer from late 2003 to 2004. He would also appear in comedy bits for the show. Then in 2004, Mighty Mighty Bosstones & The Defiant singer Dicky Barrett took over as the show's announcer when the Bosstones went on a hiatus. Barrett left the show in 2022 and was replaced by comedian Lou Wilson.

Since its inception, stand-up comedian Don Barris has performed as the warmup comic for the in-studio audience, although he rarely appears on camera; before joining JKL, Barris was the warmup comic for The Man Show.

Francis "Uncle Frank" Potenza, Kimmel's real-life uncle, served as a security guard for the show, and appeared regularly in bits on-camera with Kimmel and other employees of the show. He was a New York City police officer and a personal security guard for Frank Sinatra. Potenza did not appear regularly from December 2009 through March 2010, due to illness. (In the interim, he did appear on the seventh anniversary show on January 26, 2010.) However, he later returned as a semi-regular. Potenza died on August 23, 2011, at the age of 77. Veatrice Rice was another parking lot security guard who had several of her own segments on the show until her death from cancer on January 21, 2009.

=== Kimmel and Matt Damon ===
Beginning in 2005, Kimmel started thanking the guests as usual, but then adds, "Our apologies to Matt Damon, we ran out of time", starting a satirical feud between him and the actor. Damon himself told Parade magazine in 2011 that Kimmel said he first did it at a low moment at the end of a show which had substandard guests. The show's producer liked the joke, and Kimmel continued to do it on subsequent shows for their amusement. During a 2013 appearance on the radio talk show Fresh Air, Kimmel further stated that he only chose Damon's name because it was the first A-list actor that popped into his head that "we absolutely would not bump if he was on the show".

On September 12, 2006, Damon appeared on the show. A montage of clips demonstrating the numerous times Kimmel performed the bit was shown and, after a very lengthy introduction by Kimmel, Damon appeared on stage. After a few seconds, Kimmel apologized and stated that the show was out of time. He asked Damon if he could return the next night, to which Damon replied, "Go fuck yourself." An infuriated Damon continued to curse at Kimmel throughout the rolling of the credits, ultimately slapping the desk and walking off the set. In the December 17, 2006, issue of USA Weekend, Kimmel acknowledged that the Damon incident was a joke. In the show which aired on June 5, 2007, Kimmel sent his sidekick Guillermo to the Ocean's Thirteen premiere to interview Damon, though when he started the interview, he said that they were out of time, at which point Damon assumed that Kimmel sent him. In the August 2, 2007, episode, Kimmel then announced that Guillermo was taking on the role of Jason Bourne, who was played by Damon, for The Bourne Ultimatum. A clip was shown in which Guillermo was playing Bourne, until Damon showed up and thought that Kimmel was now trying to bump him from his movie. Damon tried to chase Guillermo but Guillermo slapped him and jumped through a wall. In Kimmel's 2010 post-Oscar show, he featured a clip called "The Handsome Men's Club", which ended with Damon telling Kimmel, "We're all out of time," then bursting into evil laughter after Kimmel was ejected from the club for not being handsome enough. However, it turned out to be a dream, as he wakes up next to Ben Affleck.

Damon was part of the all-star cast assembled by Kimmel for his 2012 Oscars parody, which was a mock trailer for a non-existent blockbuster called Movie: The Movie. Damon appears briefly in a full grape suit, only to be informed his scene had been cut from the "film" after which he is shown storming out of the studio (as part of the trailer), cursing at Kimmel. In the mock trailer for the sequel, 'Movie: The Movie 2', Damon appears again as an alien who is munching on a sandwich only to think he is munching something else. He walks out cursing Kimmel again. However, it later shown to just be a toy.

In August 2013, Guillermo crashed a Matt Damon interview, about his upcoming movie Elysium, by promoting his own movie called "Estupido", about a stupid man, poster for which had an arrow pointing towards Matt Damon. At the end of the interview, Matt removed the poster, revealing on the other side the name of another Guillermo movie called "Ass Face", also with an arrow pointing towards Matt. Matt accuses Guillermo of acting on Kimmel's orders and, facing the camera, starts to say "you...", at which time it cuts to Guillermo's promo which ends with Matt's face turning into an ass.

In February 2014, Damon was invited with the cast of The Monuments Men. Damon sat in another seat. A fake fire was activated at the end of the show when Kimmel asked Damon a question.

During Kimmel's 2016 post-Oscar special, Ben Affleck wore a very large coat for his appearance, and Damon emerged from the coat for the interview. However, he was removed from the studio by an enraged Kimmel, who then moved on to interview Affleck. Later, Damon appeared in a sketch about the movie that Affleck stars in, Batman v Superman: Dawn of Justice, reprising his role as astronaut Mark Watney.

When Kimmel hosted the 89th Academy Awards on February 26, 2017, he renewed his feud with Damon, first in a skit harshly criticizing Damon's film We Bought a Zoo, having the announcer introduce him as only the unnamed "guest" of Ben Affleck, and personally conducting the orchestra to play him off while Damon was talking (before announcing the nominees and award winner). On an appearance on The Tonight Show Starring Jimmy Fallon, Damon praised Fallon for his speedy invitation process, which Kimmel poked fun of.

In June 2020, during the COVID-19 pandemic when Kimmel was hosting the show from his house, Damon emerged from one of Kimmel's bedrooms, revealing to have been there during the whole pandemic and demanded to be on the show, when Kimmel wanted to take a break. Then it was revealed Kimmel's wife had been cheating on him with Damon again. This resulted in Kimmel telling Damon he is not on the show.

On April 1, 2022, with Jimmy Fallon hosting in place of Kimmel for April Fools' Day, Fallon announced Matt Damon as a guest on the show. Instead, Justin Timberlake emerged wearing Boston Red Sox apparel and carrying a Dunkin' Donuts coffee cup, loosely in character as Matt Damon. The interview ended with Timberlake spray painting "I <3 Matt Damon" on the front of Kimmel's desk.

==== "I'm fucking Matt Damon" video ====
In a segment that aired on January 31, 2008, Kimmel's then long-time girlfriend Sarah Silverman appeared on the show and announced, via a music video, that she had been "fucking Matt Damon." Damon took an additional jab at Kimmel's long running gag by telling Kimmel at the end of the video, "Jimmy, we're out of time. Sorry."

On February 24, on Kimmel's third post-Oscar show, he debuted his rebuttal video, announcing that he was doing the same to Ben Affleck. Kimmel introduced his star-studded musical by addressing Damon and vowing, "You take something I love from me, I'm gonna take something you love from you." Affleck is Damon's longtime acting and writing collaborator; the two first became prominent as such for Good Will Hunting and later channeled this collaboration into Project Greenlight.

In addition to Affleck, the video featured Robin Williams, Don Cheadle, Harrison Ford, Hynden Walch, Cameron Diaz, Christina Applegate, Benji Madden and Joel Madden from Good Charlotte, Dicky Barrett, Christopher Mintz-Plasse, Lance Bass, Dominic Monaghan, Meat Loaf, Pete Wentz, Joan Jett, Huey Lewis, Perry Farrell, Macy Gray, Rebecca Romijn, Josh Groban, Jessica DiCicco, and unnamed choir singers as recording booth singers, along with Brad Pitt as a delivery man. The video gained widespread media attention, with Kimmel jokingly telling the New York Times, "Every once in a while, Hollywood rallies itself for a worthy cause." On its end-of-the-decade "best-of" list, Entertainment Weekly put Damon as an action star at No. 60 and the Silverman video on No. 62, writing, "A talk-show host's famous comedian girlfriend confesses in a catchy song that she's shtupping No. 60? Yeah, that'll go viral."

In 2008, the segment won a Creative Arts Emmy Award for Outstanding Original Music and Lyrics.

==== Jimmy Kimmel Sucks! ====
For the 10th anniversary episode on January 24, 2013, Damon took over hosting duties; for the occasion, the show was renamed Jimmy Kimmel Sucks! The episode began with a sequence of clips showing Kimmel "bumping" Damon, and continued with Damon taking command of the show, while Kimmel was tied to a chair and gagged for the remainder of the episode. Damon then replaced Guillermo with Andy Garcia and bandleader Cleto with Sheryl Crow, before bringing in Robin Williams to do the monologue.

The show had numerous guests, including Nicole Kidman, Gary Oldman, Amy Adams, Reese Witherspoon, Demi Moore, and Sarah Silverman, along with an on-screen cameo by Ben Affleck during Damon's monologue. There were also numerous taped pieces congratulating Damon on hosting, including by Jennifer Lopez, Sally Field, John Krasinski, Robert De Niro, Don Cheadle, Oprah Winfrey, and Kimmel's parents. Damon also "revealed" that Kimmel keeps "bumping" Damon out of jealousy: a clip shows Kimmel's unsuccessful attempts to audition for all movie roles that Damon played. At the episode's end, Damon turns the "We ran out of time" joke on Kimmel after asking Kimmel if he had anything to say. The episode was the highest-rated late night show that evening, and ABC elected to rebroadcast it in primetime the following week.

=== Jay Leno parody ===
During the 2010 Tonight Show conflict, Kimmel donned a gray wig and fake chin, performing his entire January 12, 2010, show in character as Jay Leno. With his bandleader, Cleto Escobedo, parodying Leno's bandleader Kevin Eubanks, Kimmel started out his monologue with "It's good to be here on ABC. Hey, Cleto, you know what ABC stands for? Always Bump Conan." He also referenced the "People of Earth" letter written by Conan O'Brien, noting how O'Brien declined to participate in the "destruction" of The Tonight Show, commenting as Leno that "Fortunately, though, I will! I'll burn it down if I have to!" Leno called Kimmel the next morning to discuss the bit, and at the end of the call, Leno suggested he come over and appear on his show. When his booking department called to confirm his appearance on a "10 at 10" segment, Kimmel agreed immediately. When he received the questions for his January 14 appearance—such as "What's your favorite snack junk food?"—he realized Leno intended to neutralize the scathing parody and paint the two as friends.

Kimmel, however, was upfront with wanting to discuss the fiasco at hand, and upon his appearance, attempted to steer the questions that way: when asked about his favorite prank, he responded, "I think the best prank I ever pulled was, I told a guy once, 'Five years from now I'm going to give you my show.' And then when the five years came, I gave it to him and I took it back, almost instantly." Another example came from when Leno asked, "Ever order anything off the TV?" Kimmel replied, "Like when NBC ordered your show off the TV?"

Following similar remarks to more questions, Kimmel closed the segment with this comment: "Listen, Jay. Conan and I have children. All you have to take care of is cars! We have lives to lead here! You've got eight hundred million dollars! For God's sakes, leave our shows alone!" Leno never fought back and accepted the bit as comedy (he described it as Kimmel attempting to score some publicity), but Leno's producer, Debbie Vickers, was furious.

Kimmel discussed the appearance during an interview with Marc Maron for the latter's podcast in 2012. Kimmel stated that he felt O'Brien was not given a proper chance, but that he was also motivated by his own history with Leno. According to Kimmel, Leno had some years prior been in serious discussions with ABC about the possibility of jumping ship from NBC. During this period, Leno initiated a friendship with Kimmel, wanting to ensure that they would be on good terms if the move was made. (Under that scenario, Leno would have taken Kimmel's time slot and become his lead-in.) However, after Leno made the arrangement to remain at NBC, "those conversations were gone," according to Kimmel. Realizing that Leno's relationship with him had been artificial, Kimmel felt "worked over", reasoning that Leno was using the ABC discussions as a bargaining tactic to try to get his old job back.

=== Sets ===
The stage where the show is taped has gone through many changes, from the addition of a platform in front of the stage for Kimmel to do his monologue, to various stage backgrounds. In January 2005, the show's original set, at the TV studio in the Hollywood Masonic Temple (now known as the El Capitan Entertainment Centre), which had video screens in the background and the band performing on the left side of the stage, was replaced with the current set, which has a city in the background. The band now performs on the right side of the stage.

In the special February 25, 2007, episode of Jimmy Kimmel Live! (the second "After the Academy Awards" show), the second set was slightly tweaked when an illustrated picture of a city, which was seen in the background from January 2005 to February 2007, was replaced with a 3D collage of Los Angeles and Hollywood (including the adjacent Dolby Theatre (formerly Kodak Theatre) across from the studio where his show is broadcast from). The 3D image, which was first used during Lionel Richie's outdoor stage performances in the September 16, 2006, episode, was created by artists Colin Cheer and Brian Walters.

A brand-new set was unveiled January 8, 2013, coinciding with the show's move to the earlier 11:35 p.m. timeslot. The new set is similar to the previous one, though the desk and chairs are no longer a stationary set element, and are only brought out for the guest interviews. Later, the traditional city duratrans was replaced with a large floor-to-ceiling curved video display known as the "Wall of America", which most of the time displays the traditional background, but is now also able to be used for video pieces and bits, along with interviews (including ones where Kimmel is not at his desk; an instance of this was an interview through Cisco's Jabber Guest with actress Viola Davis after the first-season finale of How to Get Away with Murder in February 2015 where she was unable to fly to Los Angeles from the East Coast due to weather issues) which are branded under Cisco Systems's telepresence technology. The desk/chairs component of the set is also not permanently staged unlike most talk shows, being quickly built on-stage only after Kimmel has finished his monologue, skits and bits at center stage, a build-out seen every episode in a 'split' commercial break where Kimmel is seen interacting with the audience during it.

=== Music ===
The Jimmy Kimmel Live Concert Series segment comprises a musical performance at the end of the show, which is performed either in a more intimate space on the second floor of the Masonic Temple, or a nearby outdoor stage, along with rare on-location performances, and during the pandemic, remotely performed. Coors Light sponsored most of the show's musical performances from 2004 to 2006. In June 2005, the show partnered with Pontiac for its concerts, which were held on the "Pontiac Garage" outdoor stage in Hollywood. The "Pontiac Garage" campaign was created Leo Burnett Worldwide for the show including The Super Bowl XL Roadtrip in a Pontiac G6, and the live advertisements to coincide with the launch of the Pontiac G8 (a rebadged Holden VE Commodore). Pontiac was sponsored for 4 years until the sponsor's parent company, General Motors, filed for bankruptcy in 2009 and announced the termination of the brand. Beginning in October 2009, Anheuser-Busch's Bud Light (initially Bud Light Golden Wheat in 2009–10) replaced Pontiac as the segment's sponsor. In January 2013, Sony took over sponsorship. In 2014, AT&T took over sponsorship, then in 2015 Samsung replaced AT&T as the segment's sponsor, in 2016 Cîroc replaced Samsung as the segment's sponsor and in 2017 Mercedes-Benz became the segment's sponsor.

== Special broadcasts ==
On occasion, a special live edition is broadcast, usually after major events like the Academy Awards (except in years where Kimmel has hosted the actual ceremony). From the show's debut in 2003 until 2022, about four to seven half-hour basketball-themed broadcasts under the title Jimmy Kimmel Game Night aired at 8:00 p.m. ET (7:00 p.m. ET on Sundays) as lead-in programming to ABC's coverage of the NBA Finals. This was discontinued in 2023 after the NBA moved up its weeknight start times (making the game and pregame show to fully air in primetime), with ABC adding special 30-minute episodes of shows on Sundays; the Kimmel shows were also made more impractical by a writers' strike entering its second month.

== Openings ==
=== Cold open ===
When the show aired at 12:05 ET, the show began with a two-minute segment before the theme song and actual show. Originally a miniature monologue and preview of the guests, the segment expanded to include miniature skits and other ways to plug a product from one of the show's sponsors. (These, better known as "integrated commercials", are rarely repeated.) The cold open device was later adopted by The Late Late Show with Craig Ferguson, and it was used by James Corden for occasional segments for his version. These segments were dropped when the show moved to 11:35. For ABC's O&O stations and some affiliates, Kimmel does tape a promo introducing the night's guests and bits meant to be bedded into a late segment of their local newscasts.

=== Opening sequence ===
The show's first opening sequence featured a flyover of Hollywood, followed by Kimmel entering the theater after flipping a switch from the left side. This was later replaced with a stop-motion piece, which showed Kimmel in casual clothes picking up his dry cleaning and stopping at various locations in Hollywood before arriving at the theater. On October 27, 2011, the show introduced a new opening sequence that depicted Kimmel zip-lining through Hollywood until he arrived at the theater. In January 2015, the show premiered a new opening, created by Industrial Light & Magic. The sequence began with Kimmel turning on the lights of Los Angeles from the Hollywood sign, after which the background quickly changed to several locations in Los Angeles before transforming into the theater, where Kimmel led the camera inside. The opening was later shortened, with the Hollywood sign already lit and the background no longer changing. In 2016, after Kimmel grew out his beard, the sequence was slightly modified to remove Kimmel's presence.

From March to August 2020, while the show was filmed from his home, Kimmel's kids created a unique opening sequence. Starting in late September 2020, upon Kimmel's return to the studio, a picture of the classic 1962 ABC ID, fully recreated for the widescreen format, was used, alongside the animated version in the October 30, 2020 episode. It was later removed in December 2022. It was previously used as a variant with the American flag shown during the transition from 4:3 to 16:9 in the special episode, Intermission Accomplished: A Tribute to Trump. The intro was then simplified to a shot of the stage before Jimmy comes on. Starting in May 2021, with the return of the audience, the simplified intro began showing the show's logo from multiple angles, which now includes the sign being turned on after the "Previously on Jimmy Kimmel Live!" segment, starting in September 2023.

However, with every broadcast, the show's announcer, Dicky Barrett, then Lou Wilson starting in 2022, consistently begins by saying, "From Hollywood, it's Jimmy Kimmel Live! Tonight..." and listing the show's guests. At the end of the opening, Barrett presents a different introduction after "And now..." such as "without further ado..." or "I warned you...", concluding with "Here's Jimmy Kimmel!" while elongating the "-el" sound to give the show uniqueness. During Game Night specials, Barrett omits the introduction quips and says "And now, here's Jimmy Kimmel!". Beginning in 2020, Barrett, and later Wilson, with Wilson being shown introducing Kimmel, removed the introduction quips and instead say "And now, Jimmy Kimmel!". However, from September 2020 to May 2021, Barrett would say "And now, Jimmy Kimmel." to give a lighter tone. Originally, Andy Milonakis was the announcer.

For the show's 20th anniversary episode, an evolution of the show's intro was presented, spanning from the 2003 version to the 2021 version and culminating in the current logo. The screen ratio transitioned from 4:3 to 16:9 with the 2011 version. Wilson was not featured after the intro. Beginning in September 2023, a "Previously on Jimmy Kimmel Live!" segment, parodying recap segments from various drama shows that have episodes ended in a cliffhanger, which showed videos shared on social media, aired before the title sequence. This segment was discontinued in late February 2024. In late January 2025, a new intro premiered, featuring a drone flyover of the Hollywood Roosevelt Hotel roof, Hollywood Boulevard, and the exterior of the theater, along with other landmarks. The new intro also included performances by Cleto and the Cletones and imagery of Academy Awards, Grauman's Chinese Theatre, the Capitol Records building, and Kimmel's star on the Hollywood Walk of Fame.

== Notable episodes ==
- The Harrison Ford vs. Chewbacca Feud: On July 27, 2011, Ford appeared in a pre-show segment in which he was shown arguing in his dressing room with Chewbacca, his former co-star from the original Star Wars trilogy, over an unexplained issue apparently related to Chewbacca cheating with Ford's wife. On April 17, 2013, during another appearance on Kimmel, Chewbacca appeared in the audience during a question-and-answer session; Ford reignited the argument regarding Chewie's apparent dalliance with his wife, and the staged segment ended with a furious Ford "storming" out of the studio. Finally, on November 24, 2015, Ford settled his feud with Chewbacca by saving him from suicide, and remembering together the good old times.
- Feud with Kanye West: The rap musician launched a tirade directed at Kimmel on Twitter after a September 25, 2013, sketch involving two children re-enacting West's recent interview with BBC Radio 1 in which he calls himself the biggest rock star on the planet. Kimmel reveals the following night that West called him to demand an apology shortly before taping. In October 2013, Kimmel had West back on the show and apologized to him.
- Kids Table China comments: During the October 16, 2013, episode, Kimmel held the "Kids Table" segment to invite several 6–7-year-old children to discuss the U.S. debt problem: "We owe the Chinese a lot of money, 1.3 trillion dollars." A boy immediately suggested to "kill everyone in China." This comment elicited some laughter from the audience and Kimmel laughed it off and commented, "That's an interesting idea." He later teased the boy and asked, "Should we allow the Chinese to live?" The boy stuck to his answer. The show drew fire from offended Asian Americans and Chinese citizens. An online poll showed that 90% of the respondents were angered, saddened or guarded about the show. On October 28, 2013, Asian Americans marched through the streets of San Francisco protesting about Kimmel's show and his supposed condoning of genocide. The clip of this segment has since been removed from Kimmel's YouTube account, but can still be seen when viewing the entire episode.
- Back to the Future Day: On October 21, 2015, the future date featured in Back to the Future Part II, Michael J. Fox and Christopher Lloyd appeared as Marty McFly and "Doc" Emmett Brown arriving from 1985 in the DeLorean time machine, with Jimmy explaining what life in 2015 was like. Afterwards, Jimmy interviewed Fox as himself.
- Birth of William Kimmel: Returning to the show on May 1, 2017, after a hiatus, Jimmy, in his monologue, tearfully recounted the open-heart surgery his newborn son, William, had to undergo after it was discovered he had a congenital disease. Furthermore, the host made an impassioned plea to lawmakers in the United States government on both sides to ensure everyone has access to health care, referencing repeated efforts by Republicans in the House of Representatives to repeal the Affordable Care Act (an effort, by coincidence, House Republicans managed to reach later that week, on May 4). To care for his child, Kimmel took the rest of the week off, with guest hosts Will Arnett, Anthony Anderson, Kristen Bell and David Spade filling in. In November 2017, Shaquille O'Neal, Dave Grohl, Channing Tatum and Jennifer Lawrence filled in as guest hosts for Kimmel when his son had his second heart surgery.
- No Studio Audience: On January 27, 2020, Kimmel elected to tape the show with an empty studio following the death of NBA superstar Kobe Bryant the previous day, who had appeared on the program 15 times by Kimmel's count. An emotional Kimmel explained that he didn't feel it was appropriate to do a comedy show under the circumstances and instead spent the hour reflecting on Bryant's legacy.
- Guest Host Pete Buttigieg: On March 12, 2020, former Democratic presidential candidate and South Bend, Indiana Mayor Pete Buttigieg guest-hosted the program. Buttigieg delivered the opening monologue, interviewed actors Patrick Stewart and Tony Hale, and briefly played the keyboard. Segments included a skit in which Buttigieg applied for a new job at Wetzel's Pretzels and a mock game show (hosted by LeVar Burton) in which he tested his knowledge of Star Trek against Stewart. (He lost.) Due to the COVID-19 pandemic, several crew members and Buttigieg's husband Chasten served as the in-studio audience. This marks the first time a politician has hosted an American late-night talk show. This was also the final broadcast of the show before it switched to production from Kimmel's home during the pandemic lockdown.
- COVID-19 Vaccination Comment Controversy: On his return from his summer break on 7 September 2021, Kimmel stated that patients who are not vaccinated against COVID should be denied ICU beds with preference going to COVID vaccinated patients. Kimmel concluded his remarks by stating "Unvaccinated guy who gobbled horse goo? Rest in peace, wheezy."
- The Tonight Show Starring Jimmy Fallon Switch: On April 1, 2022, Kimmel swapped places with Jimmy Fallon as part of an April Fools' Day prank, with Fallon hosting Jimmy Kimmel Live! and Kimmel hosting The Tonight Show in New York City. Only a small number of producers, writers and network executives were notified prior.
- Return Following Suspension: On September 23, 2025, Kimmel returned to the air after a five day suspension. His show was not broadcast by Nexstar Media Group and Sinclair Broadcast Group. Despite that, the episode drew record ratings for the show.
- The Late Night Crossover: On September 30, 2025, Kimmel and Stephen Colbert appeared as guests on each other's shows. Colbert filmed his appearance on Jimmy Kimmel Live show first (which was taped in Brooklyn that week) and discussed Colbert's cancelation. Afterwards, the two traveled to the Ed Sullivan Theater to film Kimmel's interview on The Late Show with Stephen Colbert, where Kimmel discussed his suspension. Guillermo also made an appearance on the show.
- Cleto Escobedo III Tribute: On November 11, 2025, Kimmel suspended a planned 80s week following the death of longtime friend and Cleto and the Cletones bandleader Cleto Escobedo III, delivering a tearful 22 minute monologue in tribute. Cleto's father and fellow band member Cleto Escobedo Jr. performed an extended solo during one of the show's breaks. Eddie Murphy, who Kimmel said was a major inspiration to both him and Cleto as children, and Morgan Fairchild were the night's guests. The rest of the week's taping was suspended.

== Segments ==
=== Mean Tweets ===
In March 2012, in honor of Twitter's sixth anniversary, Jimmy Kimmel Live! featured a segment called "Mean Tweets" with celebrities—including Will Ferrell, Jason Bateman, Kristen Bell, Roseanne Barr, Anna Faris, and Kathy Griffin—reading aloud actual tweets directed toward them by Twitter users while the song "Everybody Hurts" by R.E.M. plays in the background. The segment was extremely popular, with more than 38 million views on YouTube by April 2015.

Additional "Mean Tweets" editions have aired, featuring celebrities including Robert De Niro, Julia Roberts, Tom Hanks, Adam Sandler, Britney Spears, Sofía Vergara, Jon Hamm, Julia Louis-Dreyfus, Aaron Paul, Benedict Cumberbatch, Cate Blanchett, Matt Damon, Vanessa Hudgens, Tim Robbins, Hugh Grant and Bill Murray. The tweets selected for the segment are invariably abusive, vulgar, or rude, often objecting to the celebrity's physical appearance or perceived lack of talent. In many cases, the celebrity is then afforded the opportunity for a brief (albeit scripted) response to the mean tweet. The show has also aired several themed editions of "Mean Tweets", including special NBA, NFL, college football, and music editions. In March 2015, President Barack Obama, who was a guest star, took part in a "President Obama edition" of "Mean Tweets", during which he read tweets from people mocking his jeans and blaming him for the high price of beer. The Obama segment attracted more than 10 million views in one day.

On occasion, Kimmel will introduce a surprise celebrity guest for a live on-stage "Mean Tweet", which was later made into a compilation. Celebrities who appeared on stage include Jeff Bridges, Dwayne Johnson and Halle Berry.

=== This Week in Unnecessary Censorship ===
A Thursday-night segment, which features clips of innocuous television shows (such as newscasts) deliberately edited (typically with bleeps in audio and pixelization in images) to make them appear offensive.

=== Jimmy Kimmel YouTube Challenge ===
Kimmel will give out a challenge to viewers asking them to videotape themselves pulling a prank on a family member or significant other, and then revealing that "Jimmy Kimmel told me to do it". The best clips are then aired on the show.

=== Lie Witness News ===
A correspondent not seen on camera will ask pedestrians on Hollywood Boulevard a fake question related to an actual current news event. Most of the people answering the question will usually play along, giving the impression that they believe that the so-called fake event really happened.

=== Jimmy Kimmel Pedestrian Question ===
Kimmel will send a "correspondent" not seen on camera to ask a set of random pedestrians a question related to a certain theme. Kimmel will then have the audience guess the answer to the question, then will reveal the answer to the audience.

=== Halloween candy YouTube segments ===
Starting in 2011, every Halloween, Kimmel asks his viewers to take away their children's Halloween candy, videotape their kids' reactions once they tell their kids that they ate their Halloween candy, and post it on YouTube with the respective hashtag. Once his team has compiled all the YouTube videos, he airs them on his broadcast days later. These segments have attracted criticism for potential promotion of emotional abuse.

=== Generation Gap ===
This segment, a quiz show between different generations of family members was spun off into its own game show produced by Kimmel and Mark Burnett. Originally ordered in 2019, it premiered on July 7, 2022, and is hosted by Kelly Ripa.

=== Other end-of-show segments ===
At the end of some shows, there are comedians doing comedy. This is occasionally seen in place of the Jimmy Kimmel Live Concert Series segment. Another end-of-show segment is the rarely seen Future Talent Showcase.

== International broadcasts ==
Jimmy Kimmel Live! airs worldwide on multiple outlets. In Australia, The Comedy Channel began airing the program in September 2009; however, it was replaced in March 2010 by the return of The Tonight Show with Jay Leno. The Comedy Channel resumed airing the program from September 22, 2015.

In Canada, the show previously aired on BiteTV and CHCH. The show aired on Citytv from 2012 until September 20, 2014. Even after its move to 11:35, Citytv continued to tape delay the show to midnight to maintain its hour-long late night newscasts. Jimmy Kimmel Live! began airing on CTV Comedy Channel (formerly The Comedy Network) beginning on September 22, 2014, initially airing in simulcast with ABC. However, in January 2015, the program was yet again tape-delayed to midnight in favor of The Nightly Show with Larry Wilmore. Jimmy Kimmel Live! aired on The Comedy Network until the end of August 2017. The following month, the show was added to CMT Canada's schedule, initially airing in simulcast with ABC. The show aired on CMT Canada until August 2018 and has not aired on a Canadian channel since. However, the show is still available to Canadians through imported ABC stations included in standard pay-TV packages. In 2022, the show returns tape delayed to Citytv.

In India, Jimmy Kimmel Live! premiered with its 14th season and has aired on weeknights since at 9:00 pm (IST) STAR World India. The show airs 12 hours after the American broadcast since September 23, 2015.

== YouTube viewers for late-night shows ==
As of January 30, 2026, the Jimmy Kimmel Live! YouTube channel shows a cumulative of 15,136,237,221 views, and The Late Show with Stephen Colbert channel shows a cumulative of 11,064,742,310 views. As of June 2026, the Jimmy Kimmel Live YouTube channel reached 22 million subscribers.

== Ratings among late-night talk shows ==
As of November 2022, Jimmy Kimmel Live! is the 20th most popular show on ABC and 97th overall on TV, watched by a total number of 1,746,000 people (0.56% rating, up +23% from October 23 to October 30, 2022) per episode, as of the average weekly audience measurement for the period ending January 22, 2023, surpassing The Tonight Show Starring Jimmy Fallon, which was watched by 1,278,000 people for the same period.

Jimmy Kimmel Live! has been repeatedly dominating late-night talk shows among adults aged 18–49. Some ratings examples mentioned below:

During the week of Jan. 16, 2023, Jimmy Kimmel Live! ranked as the No. 1 late-night talk show among adults 18-49 (307,000), beating NBC's The Tonight Show Starring Jimmy Fallon by 21% (253,000) and CBS' The Late Show with Stephen Colbert by 27% (241,000). In fact, Kimmel posted its largest advantage over The Tonight Show so far that season among adults 18-49 (+21%).

The Monday broadcast of Kimmel (on 1/16/23) was the No. 1 late-night telecast of the week among adults 18-49 (584,000).

A ratings report for the week of September 26, 2022, showed that when broadcasting from Brooklyn, New York, Jimmy Kimmel Live! ranked as the No. 1 late-night talk show among adults aged 18–49 (301,000), beating The Tonight Show Starring Jimmy Fallon by 8% (278,000) and The Late Show Starring Stephen Colbert by 14% (264,000). Kimmel stood as the No. 1 late-night talk show for the second week in a row with adults aged 18–49. Monday's telecast of Jimmy Kimmel Live! was the week's No. 1 late-night telecast among adults aged 18–49 (501,000). Kimmel claimed two of the week's Top 3 late-night telecasts with its Monday (501,000) and Thursday (311,000) broadcasts, respectively.

During the week of June 6, 2022, Jimmy Kimmel Live! ranked as the No. 1 late-night talk show for the two weeks in a row among adults 18-49 (443,000).

For the 2020–21 television season, Jimmy Kimmel Live! beat The Tonight Show in total viewers.

Season	Nielsen rank	Nielsen rating	Tied with
2002–03	4	1.7	
2003–04	5	1.6	Last Call with Carson Daly
2004–05	5	1.5	Last Call with Carson Daly
2005–06	5	1.6	
2006–07	5	1.8	
2007–08	4	1.7	The Late Late Show
2008–09	5	1.7	The Daily Show
2009–10	3	1.7	The Late Late Show
2010–11	4	1.7	
2011–12	3	1.8	
2012–13	3	2.5	
2013–14	3	2.6	
2014–15	3	2.6	
2015–16			
2017–18			
2018–19			

== Awards and nominations ==
=== Primetime Emmy Awards ===
Year	Category	Nominee(s)	Result	Ref.
2012	Outstanding Variety Series	Jimmy Kimmel, Jill Leiderman, Doug DeLuca, Jason Schrift, Erin Irwin, Jennifer Sharron, Ken Crosby, David Craig	Nominated	
2013	Outstanding Variety Series	Jimmy Kimmel, Jill Leiderman, Doug DeLuca, Jason Schrift, Erin Irwin, Jennifer Sharron, Ken Crosby, David Craig	Nominated	
2013	Outstanding Directing for a Variety Series	Andy Fisher (Episode: "Episode 13-1810")	Nominated	
2013	Outstanding Writing for a Variety Series	Gary Greenberg, Molly McNearney, Tony Barbieri, Jonathan Bines, Sal Iacono, Jimmy Kimmel, Rick Rosner, Danny Ricker, Eric Immerman, Jeff Loveness, Josh Halloway, Bess Kalb, Joelle Boucai and Bryan Paulk	Nominated	
2014	Outstanding Variety Series	Jimmy Kimmel, Jill Leiderman, Doug DeLuca, Jason Schrift, Erin Irwin, David Craig, Molly McNearney, Tony Romero, Gary Greenberg, Jennifer Sharron, Josh Weintraub, Ken Crosby and Seth Weidner	Nominated	
2015	Outstanding Variety Talk Series	Jimmy Kimmel, Jill Leiderman, Doug DeLuca, Jason Schrift, Erin Irwin, David Craig, Molly McNearney, Tony Romero, Gary Greenberg, Jennifer Sharron, Josh Weintraub, Ken Crosby and Seth Weidner	Nominated	
2016	Outstanding Variety Talk Series	Jimmy Kimmel, Jill Leiderman, Doug DeLuca, Jason Schrift, Erin Irwin, David Craig, Molly McNearney, Tony Romero, Gary Greenberg, Jennifer Sharron, Josh Weintraub, Ken Crosby and Seth Weidner	Nominated	
2017	Outstanding Variety Talk Series	Jimmy Kimmel, Jill Leiderman, Jason Schrift, Doug DeLuca, Erin Irwin, David Craig, Gary Greenberg, Tony Romero, Jennifer Sharron, Ken Crosby, Molly McNearney, Seth Weidner and Josh Weintraub	Nominated	
2017	Outstanding Directing for a Variety Series	Andy Fisher (Episode: "The (RED) Show")	Nominated	
2018	Outstanding Variety Talk Series	Jimmy Kimmel, Jill Leiderman, Jason Schrift, Doug DeLuca, Erin Irwin, David Craig, Jennifer Sharron, Gary Greenberg, Tony Romero, Ken Crosby, Molly McNearney, Seth Weidner and Josh Weintraub	Nominated	
2019	Outstanding Variety Talk Series	Jimmy Kimmel, Jill Leiderman, Doug DeLuca, Erin Irwin, David Craig, Molly McNearney, Jennifer Sharron, Gary Greenberg, Tony Romero, Josh Weintraub, Ken Crosby, Seth Weidner and Danny Ricker	Nominated	
2020	Outstanding Variety Talk Series	Jimmy Kimmel, Jill Leiderman, Doug DeLuca, Erin Irwin, David Craig, Molly McNearney, Jennifer Sharron, Gary Greenberg, Tony Romero, Josh Weintraub, Seth Weidner, Danny Ricker and Ken Crosby	Nominated	
2021	Outstanding Variety Talk Series	Jimmy Kimmel, Jill Leiderman, Doug DeLuca, Jason Schrift, Erin Irwin, David Craig, Molly McNearney, Tony Romero, Gary Greenberg, Jennifer Sharron, Josh Weintraub, Ken Crosby,Seth Weidner, and Josh Halloway	Nominated	
2022	Outstanding Variety Talk Series	Jimmy Kimmel, Erin Irwin, David Craig, Molly McNearney, Jennifer Sharron, Doug DeLuca, Gary Greenberg, Tony Romero, Jason Schrift, Josh Weintraub, Seth Weidner, Danny Ricker, Ken Crosby, Josh Halloway, Patrick Friend, Nancy Fowkes, and Craig Powell	Nominated	
2023	Outstanding Talk Series	Jimmy Kimmel, Erin Irwin, David Craig, Molly McNearney, Jennifer Sharron, Doug DeLuca, Gary Greenberg, Tony Romero, Jason Schrift, Josh Weintraub, Seth Weidner, Danny Ricker, Rory Albanese, Ken Crosby, Josh Halloway, Patrick Friend, Nancy Fowkes, and Craig Powell	Nominated	
2024	Outstanding Talk Series	Jimmy Kimmel, Erin Irwin, David Craig, Molly McNearney, Jennifer Sharron, Doug DeLuca, Gary Greenberg, Tony Romero, Josh Weintraub, Seth Weidner, Danny Ricker, Rory Albanese, Ken Crosby, Josh Halloway, Patrick Friend, Nancy Fowkes, and Craig Powell	Nominated	
2025	Outstanding Talk Series		Nominated	

=== Creative Arts Emmy Awards ===
Year	Category	Nominee(s)	Result	Ref.
2007	Outstanding Technical Direction, Camerawork, Video Control for a Series	Ervin D. Hurd, Parker Bartlett, Randy Gomez Jr., Greg Grouwinkel, Mark Gonzalez, Garrett Hurt, Ritch Kenney, Kris Wilson, Mike Malone, Marc Hunter and Guy Jones (Episode: "Jay Z Show")	Nominated	
2008	Outstanding Picture Editing of Clip Packages for Talk, Performance, Award or Reality Competition Programs	James Crowe (Episode: "5th Year Anniversary Show – I'm Fucking Matt Damon")	Won	
2008	Outstanding Picture Editing of Clip Packages for Talk, Performance, Award or Reality Competition Programs	Jason Bielski (Episode: "After the Academy Awards – I'm Fucking Ben Affleck")	Nominated	
2008	Outstanding Technical Direction, Camerawork, Video Control for a Series	Ervin D. Hurd, Parker Bartlett, Randy Gomez Jr., Greg Grouwinkel, Garrett Hurt, Ritch Kenney, Kris Wilson, Gary Taillon and Chris Gray (Episode: "After the Academy Awards")	Nominated	
2008	Outstanding Original Music and Lyrics	Tony Barbieri, Sal Iacono, Wayne McClammy, Sarah Silverman and Dan Warner (Song: "I'm Fucking Matt Damon")	Won	
2009	Outstanding Lighting Direction (Electronic, Multi-Camera) for Variety, Music or Comedy Programming	Christian Hibbard and Matt Ford (Episode: "Episode 09-1182")	Nominated	
2009	Outstanding Technical Direction, Camerawork, Video Control for a Series	Ervin D. Hurd, Parker Bartlett, Randy Gomez Jr., Marc Hunter, Garrett Hurt, Ritch Kenney, Bernd Reinhardt, Kris Wilson, Roy Walker, Guy Jones and Chris Gray (Episode: "Episode 09-1182")	Nominated	
2010	Outstanding Costumes for a Variety, Nonfiction, or Reality Programming	Rodney Munoz (Episode: "Episode 09-1266")	Won	
2010	Outstanding Short Form Picture Editing	Kevin McCullough (Episode: "Episode 10-1304 – The Late Night Wars")	Nominated	
2010	Outstanding Short Form Picture Editing	Brian Marsh (Episode: "Episode 10-1330 – The Handsome Men's Club")	Nominated	
2011	Outstanding Short Form Picture Editing	Brian Marsh (Episode: "After The Academy Awards – The President's Speech")	Nominated	
2011	Outstanding Lighting Design / Lighting Direction for a Variety Series	Christian Hibbard (Episode: "Michel Gondry Directs")	Nominated	
2013	Outstanding Technical Direction, Camerawork, Video Control for a Series	Ervin D. Hurd, Kris Wilson, Ritch Kenney, Parker Bartlett, Greg Grouwinkel, Randy Gomez, Garrett Hurt, Bernd Reinhardt and Guy Jones (Episode: "Episode 12-1776")	Nominated	
2014	Outstanding Technical Direction, Camerawork, Video Control for a Series	Ervin D. Hurd, Parker Bartlett, Danny Bonilla, Nick Gomez, Randy Gomez, Greg Grouwinkel, Garrett Hurt, Ritch Kenney, Bernd Reinhardt, Kris Wilson and Guy Jones (Episode: "In Austin")	Nominated	
2014	Outstanding Multi-Camera Picture Editing for a Comedy Series	James Crowe, Jason Bielski, Brian Marsh, Kevin McCullough and Matt Williams (Episode: "Behind the Scandelabra")	Nominated	
2016	Outstanding Technical Direction, Camerawork, Video Control for a Series	Ervin D. Hurd, Kris Wilson, Parker Bartlett, Greg Grouwinkel, Nick Gomez, Garrett Hurt, Bernd Reinhardt, Mark Gonzales, James Alario, Kevin Murphy, Carlos Rios, Marc Hunter and Guy Jones (Episode: "In Brooklyn")	Nominated	
2017	Outstanding Original Music and Lyrics	Jonathan Kimmel & Gary Greenberg ("The Ballad of Claus Jorstad (Devil Stool)")	Nominated	
2018	Outstanding Technical Direction, Camerawork, Video Control for a Series	Ervin D. Hurd, Guy Jones, Randy Gomez Jr., Parker Bartlett, David Plakos, Nick Gomez, Garrett Hurt, Mark Gonzales, Bernd Reinhardt, James Alario and Damien Tuffereau (Episode: "Jimmy Kimmel Live In Brooklyn: Billy Joel And Tracy Morgan")	Nominated	
2020	Outstanding Lighting Design / Lighting Direction for a Variety Series	Christian Hibbard, William Peets, Kille Knobel and James Worman (Episode: "Jimmy Kimmel Live in Brooklyn – Jason Alexander, Tracy Morgan, John Krasinski, Paul Shaffer and Music from Kanye West")	Nominated	
2020	Outstanding Short Form Variety Series	Jimmy Kimmel, Jill Leiderman, Molly McNearney, Tony Romero, Seth Weidner and Danny Ricker ("Jimmy Kimmel's Quarantine Minilogues")	Nominated	
2020	Outstanding Technical Direction, Camerawork, Video Control for a Series	Ervin D. Hurd Jr., Guy Jones, Parker Bartlett, Greg Grouwinkel, Garrett Hurt, Kris Wilson, Mark Gonzales, Nick Gomez, Bernd Reinhardt, Damien Tuffereau and Steve Garrett (Episode: "Jimmy Kimmel Live in Brooklyn – Jon Stewart, Benedict Cumberbatch, Kelly Ripa and Music from David Byrne")	Nominated	
2021	Outstanding Technical Direction, Camerawork, Video Control for a Series	Ervin D. Hurd Jr., Garrett Hurt, Greg Grouwinkel, Steve Garrett, Bernd Reinhardt, Kris Wilson, Guy Jones	Nominated	
2023	Outstanding Directing for a Variety Series	Andy Fisher	Nominated	
2024	Outstanding Directing for a Variety Series	Andy Fisher	Nominated	
2025	Outstanding Directing for a Variety Series	Andy Fisher	Nominated	
2025	Outstanding Production Design for a Variety Series or Reality Program		Nominated	

== See also ==
- List of late-night network TV programs
- List of late-night American network TV programs

== Additional sources ==
- Carter, Bill (2010). The War for Late Night: When Leno Went Early and Television Went Crazy. New York, NY: Plume. ISBN 978-0452297494.
