= Gary Greenberg =

American author and comedian

Gary Greenberg is an American author and comedian. He is known for writing comedic material for Comedy Central. He has appeared on Comedy Central and Bravo. As of 2017, he is a staff writer on Jimmy Kimmel Live! on ABC Television. In 2012, he won a Producers and Writers Guild Award for his work as head writer of Jimmy Kimmel's After the Academy Awards telecast.

== Published works ==
Greenberg is the author of The Pop-up Book of Phobias, The Pop-up Book of Nightmares, Self-Helpless: The Greatest Self-Help Books You'll Never Read, and Be Prepared: A Practical Handbook For New Dads. Be Prepared has received positive reviews from Publishers Weekly, Parenting, Men's Health, and Esquire.

- Greenberg, Gary; and Matthew Reinhart (1999). The Pop-up Book of Phobias, It Books, 22 pages. ISBN 978-0688171957
- Greenberg, Gary; and Jonathan Bines (1999). Self-Helpless: The Greatest Self-Help Books You'll Never Read, Career Press, 160 pages ISBN 978-1564144119
- Greenberg, Gary; Balvis Rubess; and Matthew Reinhart (2001). The Pop-up Book of Nightmares, St. Martin's Press, 22 pages. ISBN 978-0312282639
- Greenberg, Gary; and Jeannie Hayden (2004). Be Prepared: A Practical Handbook For New Dads, Simon & Schuster, 240 pages. ISBN 978-0743251549
- Greenberg, Gary (2023). Psychiatrische Diagnostik außer Kraft setzen. In: Will Hall, Jenseits der Psychiatrie – Stimmen und Visionen des Wahnsinns im Madness Radio. Berlin & Lancaster: Peter Lehmann Publishing, pp. 26-33. ISBN 978-3-910546-23-3 (paperback), ISBN 978-3-910546-26-4 (e-book)
