= Rick Rosner =

American television producer (born 1941)

- Born: May 2, 1941 (age 85); United States
- Occupations: Television producer, writer

Richard Rosner (born c. 1941) is an American television producer best known for creating the television show CHiPs. Rosner later developed a portable satellite television in partnership with DirecTV.

== Life and career ==
Rosner's father, Alfred D. Rosner, sold insurance. Rosner worked as an NBC page during college, and he returned to the job after dropping out of Cornell University College of Veterinary Medicine after a few weeks. Soon he got a job as a television producer working for Allen Funt's Candid Camera.

After getting his start writing episodic television, Rosner became a producer on The Mike Douglas Show, where he introduced on-location episodes. He was an executive with Warner Bros. before NBC named him its Vice President of Variety Programming in 1975.

=== CHiPs ===
Rosner wrote several TV movies before creating the central characters and developing the core format of the series CHiPs, about two California Highway Patrol motorcycle cops and the district out of which they worked. He had befriended members of the Los Angeles County Sheriff's Department during a scuba training seminar for Steve Allen, and it was while he was taking a course with the Sheriff's Department that he got the idea for CHiPs. The show was an immediate hit, and 138 episodes were produced between 1977 and 1983. In 2005, a CHiPs film was announced, with Wilmer Valderrama attached to star and Rosner executive producing.

=== Lottery! ===
Aside from CHiPs, Rosner also created the central characters and developed the core format of Lottery!

=== Game shows ===
Rosner also became a producer of game shows in the 1980s, starting with Just Men! in 1983, hosted by Betty White; due to NBC putting the show on at noon, this led to pre-emptions and low ratings against other shows, meaning a quick cancellation. Co-producing with Orion Television, this led to Rosner being tapped to produce a revival of Hollywood Squares, which Orion had acquired the format rights to via Filmways in 1982. The New Hollywood Squares, as it was known to distinguish itself from the original show, ran from 1986 to 1989 in syndication. Rosner's final game show, Caesars Challenge, was co-produced with Stephen J. Cannell Productions (as Orion had gone bankrupt two years prior); intended for syndication, it wound up on NBC as well in 1993, the final new daytime game to debut on the network (and the final one in general until a revival of Let's Make a Deal premiered on CBS in 2009). With affiliates pre-empting the show in droves, it too suffered a short life, ending seven months later in January 1994.
