= Azie Dungey =

American actress, comedian and writer

Azie Mira Dungey is an American actress, producer, and writer, known for the 2013 web series Ask a Slave. She has also written for the TV series Unbreakable Kimmy Schmidt, Girls5eva, and Sweetbitter, and Harlem (2021).

== Early life and education ==
Azie Mira Dungey is from the Washington, DC / Maryland / Virginia area, dubbed "the DMV" by locals. She spent some of her early years ins Philadelphia with her grandparents, as her mother was attending law school, she and has her grandfather's last name. She also lived in Maryland in her younger years.

Dungey is both African American and Pamunkey, also Mattaponi, and a very active member of the Native community. The tribe's enrollment policies that excluded members who married or had children with African Americans was exposed by the Congressional Black Caucus during their recognition process in 2013. Dungey comes from a family that was victim to Pamunkey anti-Black tribal law and as of August 2020 they were seeking enrollment.

She graduated from New York University's Tisch School of the Arts.

She admired Tina Fey from a young age and was an avid watcher of Saturday Night Live.

== Career ==
Dungey took part in a number of theatre productions in Washington, DC, including The Walworth Farce at Studio Theatre.

Dungey performed the role of George Washington's family's enslaved lady's maid, as part of an ongoing historical reenactment of life at the Mount Vernon plantation in Virginia once owned by president Washington. Part of her job was to answer tourists' questions about slavery while staying in character. She worked there part-time for nearly two years from 2010 to 2012.

In 2013, Dungey moved to Los Angeles. She then wrote the script for a comedic web series called Ask a Slave, and performed the lead role, that of Lizzie Mae, a slave. The series, which she also produced, includes actual incidents from her experiences on the plantation. Released on YouTube, the series attracted hundreds of thousands of page views soon after its release. After the success of the series, Salon magazine listed her as one of 10 black women Saturday Night Live could hire.

She was invited by Tina Fey to write for the Netflix series Unbreakable Kimmy Schmidt and later wrote for Girls5eva, both produced by Fey and Robert Carlock. She also co-wrote and co-produced the TV drama series Sweetbitter on Starz, based on the bestselling novel of the same title by Stephanie Danler.

From 2019, Dungey wrote and hosted on Season 1 of Say It Loud, an educational series for PBS Digital. Also in 2019, she was executive producer and writer for Lena Waithe's Twenties, a sitcom on BET and Showtime, as well as Tracy Oliver's comedy series Harlem (2021), for which her writing was praised.

Towards the end of the prolonged 2023 writers' strike in the U.S., during which Azie stood on the picket line for nearly four months, she went to Australia. There she connected and worked with some of the Indigenous Australian peoples in the Kimberley region in the north of Western Australia, and did a workshop at Goolarri Media in Broome. She was excited to meet Mark Coles Smith, star of the third series of Mystery Road, and was inspired to tell some of the stories of the Aboriginal peoples of the region, such as the story of Bunuba warrior Jandamarra.

== Personal life ==
Dungey has lived on Standing Rock Reservation on Sioux Country, in North and South Dakota.
