= Sweetbitter (TV series) =

American drama television series

- Genre: Drama
- Created by: Stephanie Danler
- Based on: Sweetbitter by Stephanie Danler
- Starring: Ella Purnell; Tom Sturridge; Caitlin FitzGerald; Evan Jonigkeit; Eden Epstein; Jasmine Mathews; Daniyar; Paul Sparks
- Composer: Will Bates
- Country of origin: United States
- Original language: English
- No. of seasons: 2
- No. of episodes: 14

Production
- Executive producers: Stuart Zicherman; Stephanie Danler; Brad Pitt; Dede Gardner; Jeremy Kleiner; Sarah Esberg; Richard Shepard
- Producer: Donna E. Bloom
- Cinematography: Terry Stacey
- Camera setup: Single-camera
- Running time: 28–29 minutes
- Production companies: Sleeping Indian Inc.; Plan B Entertainment

Original release
- Network: Starz
- Release: May 6, 2018 – August 18, 2019

Sweetbitter is an American drama television series, based on the 2016 novel of the same name by Stephanie Danler and inspired by her time working in New York’s well-known restaurant Union Square Café. The show premiered on May 6, 2018, on Starz. In July 2018, it was announced that Starz had renewed the series for a second season, which premiered on July 14, 2019. In December 2019, the series was canceled after two seasons.

== Premise ==
"Sweetbitter follows Tess, who shortly after arriving in New York City, lands a job at a celebrated downtown restaurant. Swiftly introduced to the world of drugs, drinking, love, lust, dive bars and fine dining, she learns to navigate the chaotically alluring, yet punishing life she has stumbled upon."

== Cast and characters ==
=== Main ===
- Ella Purnell as Tess
- Tom Sturridge as Jake
- Caitlin FitzGerald as Simone
- Evan Jonigkeit as Will
- Eden Epstein as Ariel ‘Ari’
- Jasmine Mathews as Heather
- Daniyar as Sasha
- Paul Sparks as Howard

=== Recurring ===
- Jimmie Saito as Scott
- Katerina Tannenbaum as Becky
- Rafa Beato as Santos

=== Guest ===
- Sandra Bernhard as Maddie Glover

== Episodes ==
Season	Episodes	Originally released	
Season	Episodes	First released	Last released
1	6	May 6, 2018	June 10, 2018
2	8	July 14, 2019	August 18, 2019

=== Season 1 (2018) ===
No. overall	No. in season	Title	Directed by	Written by	Original release date	U.S. viewers (millions)
1	1	"Salt"	Richard Shepard	Stephanie Danler	May 6, 2018	0.038
2	2	"Now Your Tongue Is Coded"	Cherien Dabis	Stuart Zicherman	May 13, 2018	0.160
3	3	"Everyone Is Soigné"	Adam Bernstein	Kenneth Lin	May 20, 2018	0.174
4	4	"Simone's"	Shira Piven	Liz Tuccillo	May 27, 2018	0.217
5	5	"Weird Night"	Ry Russo-Young	Stephanie Danler & Deborah Schoeneman	June 3, 2018	0.185
6	6	"It's Mine"	Stuart Zicherman	Jaquen Castellanos & Azie Dungey	June 10, 2018	0.210

=== Season 2 (2019) ===
No. overall	No. in season	Title	Directed by	Written by	Original release date	U.S. viewers (millions)
7	1	"The Pork Special"	Augustine Frizzell	Stephanie Danler	July 14, 2019	0.119
8	2	"Equifax & Experian"	Augustine Frizzell	Stuart Zicherman	July 14, 2019	0.092
9	3	"Last of the Season"	Marta Cunningham	Kenneth Lin	July 21, 2019	0.095
10	4	"Sec or Demi-Sec"	Marta Cunningham	Charise Castro Smith	July 28, 2019	0.099
11	5	"Entropy"	Geeta Patel	Sharr White	August 4, 2019	0.077
12	6	"Truffles and Champagne"	Geeta Patel	Christopher Oscar Peña	August 11, 2019	0.108
13	7	"Peach Treats"	Stuart Zicherman	Lucy Thurber	August 18, 2019	0.086
14	8	"Bodega Cat"	Stuart Zicherman	Azie Dungey & Luke Sand	August 18, 2019	0.065

== Production ==
=== Development ===
In July 2017, it was reported that Starz was developing a television adaptation of Stephanie Danler's novel Sweetbitter and considering ordering it to series. The project was based on a pilot script developed by Danler and Stu Zicherman, written by Danler, and produced by Plan B Entertainment. Starz ordered additional scripts and assembled a small writers room with an eye toward a potential straight-to-series order. Starz president and CEO Chris Albrecht said at the time, "It’s a book that several of the women at Starz had read and were excited about. When we heard it may be a project, I literally had some of my colleagues come and say this is one we’ve got to get; it plays into young female demographic but as we know women of all ages will certainly be attracted to great stories."

In October 2017, Starz officially ordered the show to series for a first season consisting of six half-hour episodes. It was also announced that Richard Shepard, had come on board to direct and executive produce, Donna Bloom would serve as producer on series, and that Laura Rosenthal was leading the ongoing casting search.

In January 2018, it was announced at the annual Television Critics Association winter press tour that the series would premiere on May 6, 2018. On July 13, 2018, it was reported that Starz had renewed the series for a second season in which is set to premiere on July 14, 2019. On December 20, 2019, Starz canceled the series after two seasons.

=== Casting ===
On October 6, 2017, two days after the show was ordered to series, it was announced that Ella Purnell had been cast in the series lead role as Tess. Later that month, the rest of the main cast was announced. These included Tom Sturridge, Caitlin FitzGerald, Paul Sparks, Evan Jonigkeit, Daniyar, Eden Epstein, and Jasmine Mathews. On January 17, 2018, it was announced that Jimmie Saito had been cast in a recurring role as Scott, "the restaurant’s handsome, strong-minded sous chef". On October 24, 2018, it was reported that Sandra Bernhard had been cast in a guest starring role for season two.

=== Filming ===
Principal photography for the first season lasted from October to December 2017 in New York City, New York.

== Release ==
Promotional poster.

=== Marketing ===
On March 1, 2018, Starz released the first poster and trailer for the series.

On March 10, 2018, Starz opened the "Starz Sensory House" at the annual South by Southwest Film Festival in Austin, Texas. It featured a multitude of screens playing the trailers for two new Starz series, Vida and Sweetbitter, on a loop. Various types of food and drinks were available and designed thematically to match. For Sweetbitter, Sugarfina handed out a selection of alcohol-inspired sweets, including martini almond olives and champagne gummy bears. Additionally, a series of six artisanal cocktails were also available, designed by Austin-based bartender Tacy Rowland. One such cocktail based on Sweetbitter included the "Autumn in New York", featuring cognac, sherry, coffee, bitter lemon and a rosemary garnish. Other services contained in the sensory house included mini manicures that were offered by the Austin-based Nails Y’all, and a perfume bar Roux Saint James, which created four custom scents inspired by Sweetbitter’s four main characters. The Starz Sensory House was located at 88 Rainey Street in Austin and operated until March 12.

=== Premiere ===
On April 26, 2018, the series held its world premiere at the SVA Theatre in New York City, New York during the annual Tribeca Film Festival. Following the screening a discussion was held with creator, executive producer, and writer Stephanie Danler, showrunner Stuart Zicherman, and cast members Ella Purnell, Caitlin FitzGerald, Tom Sturridge, and Paul Sparks.

== Reception ==
The first season has been met with a mixed to negative response from critics. On the review aggregation website Rotten Tomatoes, the first season holds a 30% approval rating with an average rating of 5.25 out of 10 based on 23 reviews. The website's critics consensus reads, "Sweetbitter fails to live up to its well-received literary source material – or stand out from the many big-city coming-of-age television series that came before it." Metacritic, which uses a weighted average, assigned the season a score of 52 out of 100 based on 14 critics, indicating "mixed or average reviews".
