= Treyger =

Treyger is a surname. Notable people with the surname include:

- Liza Treyger (born 1987), Ukrainian-born comedian and actress
- Mark Treyger (born 1982), American politician
