= Shoniqua Shandai =

American actress

- Born: August 6, 1989 (age 37); New York City, New York
- Occupation: Actress
- Years active: 2010–present

Shoniqua Shandai is an American actress. She is best known for playing Angie Wilson in the sitcom Harlem and Devine Wright in the battle rap comedy drama film Bodied.

== Early life ==
Shandai was born in New York City but grew up in Richmond, Virginia. She is a graduate of the Los Angeles City College and also took acting lesson at the Playhouse West Acting School.

== Career ==
One of Shandais first appearances on screen came in a one off scene in the The Back-up Plan starring Jennifer Lopez. She played the lead role of Zola in the short film Zola Jumps In. She played Gina Claymore in the horror film Violence of the Mind which won Best Drama at the San Antonio Q Fest One of her first lead roles in a full length film came playing Devine Wright in the battle rap film Bodied produced by Eminem Her biggest role so far has been playing Angie Wilson in the sitcom series Harlem starring alongside Meagan Good, Jerrie Johnson and Grace Byers. She along with the rest of the cast went to various Jazz clubs around the Harlem area, an experience which she described as proving the stereotype All New Yorkers are Mean was untrue. For her performance she was nominated for best supporting actress at the NAACP Image Awards.

== Personal life ==
Her favourite film growing up was The Little Mermaid and What's Love Got to Do with It. Shandai grew up without a father and felt unloveable as a child. She has said that she gained self confidence from reading the book Fabulosity: What It Is & How to Get It by Kimora Lee Simmons.

== Filmography ==
=== Film ===
Year	Title	Role	Notes
2010	Chihuahua: The Movie	Nurse Betty	
2010	The Back-up Plan	Single Mother	
2010	The Church Office	Pumpkin	
2010	The Truth	Restaurant Patron	
2011	Guess Whom	Shoniqua	Short
2011	Cellular Diaspora	Black Woman	Short
2011	Battle Buddy	Pvt Lambe	Short
2013	Blonde Instinct	Harbach	Short
2013	Violence of the Mind	Gina Claymore	
2013	Bullied	Tamicka's Posse	Short
2013	OakTowne	Tariq	
2013	Animal Control	Torri JOnes	
2014	Road to Osiris	Letoya	Short
2014	Zola Jumped In	Zola	
2015	I'll See You in My Dreams	Checkout Girl	Short
2015	The Jackass from Jackson Hole Stole My Movie	Big Hollywood Agent	Short
2015	Conflicted	Shawna	Short
2015	Imperfect Sky	Babs	
2016	Jinkee Pacquiao Is My Superhero	Michelle Obama	Short
2016	Anubis Tales	Lettie	
2017	Waiting for Bob	Isis	
2017	Cash Out	Sashas Mom	Short
2017	Bodied	Devine Wright	
2018	Miss Arizona	Jasmine	
2018	Running	Coco	Short
2018	Sierra Burgess Is a Loser	Brandy	
2018	The Greatest American Hero	Tawnia Nichols	
2019	The Obituary of Tunde Johnson	Keisha Riviera	
2019	People Just do Nothing	Actress	
2021	Sisters!	Dee	Short
2022	25 Cents Per Minute	AJ	
2023	Wake	Sarita	
2025	I'm Matt Damon	Crystal	Short

=== Television ===
Year	Title	Role	Notes
2010	The Doctors	Woman at Vending Machine	Episode; Caught on Tape: Are You Making the Right Health Choices?
2015	Criminal Minds	Working Girl#3	Episode; Protection
2016	The Fosters	Phoebe	Episode; EQ
2016	Sing It!	Crystal	4 episodes
2018	Nobodies	Sonja Moore	4 episodes
2018	The Guest Book	Shyrell	2 episodes
2019	Steven Universe	Sunstone	Episode; Change Your Mind
2019	I Am the Night	Tina	5 episodes
2019	Steven Universe Future	Sunstone	Episode; A Very Special Episode
2021	Geisting	Belinda	Episode; Proof of Concept
2024	Diarra from Detroit	Raqueeba	Episode; Episode #2.1
2021–2025	Harlem	Angie Wilson	24 episodes
