= Grace Edwards (producer) =

American writer, producer, and actress

- Born: Grace Nkenge Edwards
- Education: University of Michigan (BFA); Columbia University (MFA)
- Occupations: Writer producer actress
- Years active: 2010–present

Grace Nkenge Edwards is an American writer, producer, and actress. She has written for Loosely Exactly Nicole, Unbreakable Kimmy Schmidt, and Insecure. Edwards is the creator of the Daria spinoff film Jodie, which currently is seeking a studio.

== Life and career ==
Edwards was raised in Michigan. She received her bachelor of fine arts degree in acting from University of Michigan and her master of fine arts degree in screenwriting from Columbia University.

She was a writer's assistant for Broad City and both a writer's assistant and producer for Inside Amy Schumer. Edwards' first television writing job was for MTV’s Loosely Exactly Nicole. She went on to be a staff writer for Unbreakable Kimmy Schmidt and Dollface. She has also written for Kevin Can F**k Himself and she was a producer for Mr. Mayor. She joined the writer's room and production team of Insecure for the show's fourth season.

Edwards is the creator and executive producer of Jodie, a Daria spin-off, with voice acting by Tracee Ellis Ross. The show was initially planned as a series, but in 2022 it was announced that it will be released as a feature film, until 2024 when MTV Entertainment Studios and Comedy Central dropped the completed film, with producers having the ability to shop it.

In April 2022 it was announced that Edwards is the creator and executive producer of The Wolves of 125th Street, in development at Peacock.

She has acted on Inside Amy Schumer, Decoded, Our Cartoon President, and Insecure.

Edwards is the co-creator and co-host of the podcast The Antidote with her best friend and fellow producer Amy Aniobi. The Antidote is produced by American Public Media and focuses on positive news and strategies for joy.

== Filmography ==
=== Television ===
Year	Title	Role	Writer	Producer	Notes	Ref.
2011–2012	Ugly Americans	N/A	No	No	Production coordinator	
2013–2016	Inside Amy Schumer	Various	No	Yes	Writer's assistant	
2015	Broad City	N/A	No	No	Writer's assistant	
2016–2018	Loosely Exactly Nicole	N/A	Yes	No		
2017–2019	Unbreakable Kimmy Schmidt	N/A	Yes	No		
2018–2020	Our Cartoon President	Omarosa Manigault-Newman / Michelle Obama (voices)	No	No		
2019	Dollface	N/A	Yes	No		
2020-2021	Insecure		Yes	Yes		
2021-2022	Mr. Mayor	N/A	Yes	Yes		
2022	Kevin Can F**k Himself	N/A	Yes	Co-executive producer		
2023–present	Survival of the Thickest	N/A	Yes	Executive		
2026–present	The Fall and Rise of Reggie Dinkins	N/A	Yes	Co-executive producer		

=== Film ===
Year	Title	Role	Notes
TBD	Jodie		Writer
