= Liza Treyger =

Ukrainian-born comedian and actress (born 1987)

- Born: August 31, 1987 (age 39); Odessa, Ukrainian SSR
- Education: North Park University
- Notable work: Night Owl

Comedy career
- Years active: 2014-present
- Medium: Stand-up; television; podcasts
- Genres: Deadpan; observational comedy; satire; self-deprecation

Liza Treyger (born August 31, 1987) is an American comedian, actress, and podcast host.

Born in Odessa, then part of the Ukrainian SSR (now Ukraine) and raised in Chicago, Treyger made her television debut on NBC's Last Comic Standing in 2014. She is best known as a stand-up comedian who has performed on platforms including Late Night with Seth Meyers and Chelsea Lately. Her first hour-long stand-up special, Night Owl, was released on Netflix in January 2025 to critical acclaim. As an actress, she co-starred in Netflix's Survival of the Thickest and has further appeared in Nope and The King of Staten Island. She co-hosts the popular podcast That's Messed Up: An SVU Podcast with fellow comedian and friend Kara Klenk.

== Early life ==
Liza Treyger was born in the port city of Odessa in the Ukrainian Soviet Socialist Republic, a constituent republic of the former Soviet Union (now Ukraine). At three years old, Treyger's Soviet Jewish family was granted the right to emigrate, and, after a brief stop-over in Europe, in 1990 they settled in a northern Chicago suburb of Skokie, Illinois.

Treyger graduated from North Park University in Chicago.

== Career ==
Liza Treyger got her start in the Chicago comedy scene. She started doing stand-up comedy and open mic nights around 2009. Her senior year of college she co-founded Riot Comedy, a popular, women-run weekly comedy showcase. In 2014, she performed at the inaugural Comedy Exposition standup festival in Chicago.

After moving to New York City, Treyger continued doing comedy, performing on platforms including Late Night with Seth Meyers, Chelsea Lately, and The Stand-Up Show with Katherine Ryan on Comedy Network. She also started acting, landing a major recurring role on Horace and Pete, a "Eugene O'Neill-esque dramatic web series" with Louis C.K., Steve Buscemi, Edie Falco, Alan Alda, and Jessica Lange.

Treyger recorded a half-hour stand-up special for Comedy Central in 2015 in front of a live audience in Boston. In 2018, Treyger released her second half-hour stand-up special as an episode in the first season of The Degenerates, a Netflix series of "no-holds-barred" comedy specials from "rising comics."

In 2019, Treyger brought her "wonderfully smutty solo show" In the Weeds to the Edinburgh Fringe Festival, where one reviewer, who gave the show four out of four stars, described Treyger as a "comedy queen" whose "jokes rain down thick and fast" and whose "unfiltered comments resonate with many in the audience."

Treyger and fellow comedian and friend Kara Klenk have co-hosted the podcast That's Messed Up: An SVU Podcast since November 2020. Each episode they break down episodes of Law & Order: SVU and interview actors, directors, writers and/or producers from the show. In 2022, Treyger and Klenk took the podcast on a twenty-five-city tour. Treyger has also appeared on popular podcasts like Conan O'Brien Needs a Friend and The Mash-Up Americans.

After smaller acting roles in movies like Pete Davidson's The King of Staten Island (2020) and Jordan Peele's Nope (2022), Treyger co-starred in Michelle Buteau's Survival of the Thickest (2023) on Netflix, which was renewed for a second season due to be released in March 2025.

In January 2025, Liza Treyger released her first full-hour stand-up special on Netflix, Night Owl, to critical acclaim. The New York Times included it in their article "5 Smart and Silly Specials to Entertain You", in which they wrote: "Treyger presents herself as weary and slothful, her brain broken by the internet scroll. But there's an excitement, a danger even, to her onstage persona, as she pushes jokes further than you expect, roasting the crowd." Similarly, Vulture included it in their January 2025 article "4 New Comedy Specials You Should Definitely Watch (When You Have a Moment)", writing that there's "a thrilling tension underneath all of Liza Treyger's stand-up" and that "Treyger's conversational style is refreshing, and the laughs she earns roll along with a unique rhythm."

== Filmography ==
=== Film ===
Year	Title	Role	Notes
2020	The King of Staten Island	Waitress at Denino's	
2022	Nope	Commercial Makeup Artist	
2024	Goodrich	Comedian	
2025	Night Owl	Self	Stand-up special for Netflix

=== Television ===
Year	Title	Role	Notes
2013	Adam Devine's House Party	Self	Stand-up
2014	Chelsea Lately	Self	Round Table; 4 episodes
2015	Comedy Central Presents: The Half Hour	Self	Half-hour stand-up special for Comedy Central; 2 episodes
2016	Horace and Pete	Melissa	TV mini series/web series
2016	@midnight	Self	1 episode
2016	Not Safe with Nikki Glaser	Self	1 episode
2016	Late Night with Seth Meyers	Self	1 episode
2016	This Is Not Happening	Self	1 episode
2016	Funny as Hell	Self	1 episode
2018	After After Party	Self	Video panelist
2018	Comedy Knockout	Self	1 episode
2018	The Degenerates	Self	Half-hour stand-up special for Netflix; 1 episode
2019	The Stand-Up Show with Katherine Ryan	Self	Stand-up
2019-2020	Lights Out with David Spade	Self	Panelist; 3 episodes
2020	Gayme Show	Self	1 episode
2020	Planet Scum Live	Self	1 episode
2021	Pause with Sam Jay	Soul Stroke Class	1 episode
2023–2026	Survival of the Thickest	Jade	11 episodes
2023	Watch What Happens Live with Andy Cohen	Self - Bartender	1 episode
2025	Harlem	Elyse	1 episode
2025	Watch What Happens Live with Andy Cohen	Self - First Chair Guest	1 episode

=== Audio ===
Year	Title	Role	Medium	Notes
2020-present	That's Messed Up: An SVU Podcast	Host	Podcast	305 episodes
