= Loosely Exactly Nicole =

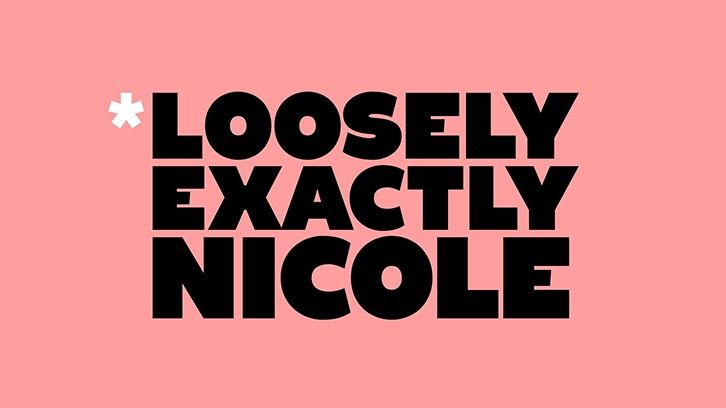
- Genre: Comedy
- Created by: Christian Lander; Christine Zander
- Starring: Nicole Byer; Jacob Wysocki
- Composer: Tim Bright
- Country of origin: United States
- Original language: English
- No. of seasons: 2
- No. of episodes: 20

Production
- Executive producers: Avi Gilbert; Tony Hernandez; Christine Zander; Christian Lander (season 1)
- Producers: Debra Spidell; Chioke Nassor (season 1); John Skidmore (season 2)
- Cinematography: Grant Smith (season 1); Kevin Atkinson (season 2)
- Running time: 17–20 minutes
- Production companies: 3 Arts Entertainment; Jax Media

Original release
- Network: MTV (season 1); Facebook Watch (season 2)
- Release: September 5, 2016 – February 21, 2018

Loosely Exactly Nicole (stylized as *Loosely Exactly Nicole) is an American comedy television series created by Christian Lander and Christine Zander that stars Nicole Byer and premiered on September 5, 2016, on MTV. After MTV cancelled the series, Facebook Watch picked up the show for a second season that premiered on December 20, 2017.

== Premise ==
As MTV explains in a promotional release:

Nicole Byer is living the Hollywood dream. Well, Hollywood adjacent – the deep valley to be precise and it’s not so much a dream but a struggle. In this hilarious half-hour comedy, we’ll watch as Nicole, exuding her special brand of confidence and irreverence, demonstrates the hilarious missteps of what it means to be out on your own for the first time. She’ll deal with humiliating auditions, unpaid electric bills, friendship ups and downs, and the battlefield that is Tinder as she slowly but surely finds her voice as a comedian.

== Cast and characters ==
=== Main ===
- Nicole Byer as herself, an aspiring actress and comedienne looking for her big break in show business
- Jacob Wysocki as Devin (season 2; recurring season 1), Nicole's roommate and best friend

=== Recurring ===
- Jen D'Angelo as Veronica, Nicole's closest girl friend
- Kevin Bigley as Derrick, a frequent hook-up of Nicole's
- Brandon Scott as Raymond
- Allyn Rachel as Avi
- French Stewart as Donny
- Sasheer Zamata as Kim Whitfield, Nicole's childhood friend who runs a charitable organization
- Ayden Mayeri as Edi
- B. J. Britt as Josh, Nicole's boyfriend

=== Guests ===
- Kerri Kenney-Silver as Bernice ("Mistress")
- Nora Dunn as Nora McNab ("Danny Boom")
- Mary Birdsong as Madison ("Green Card")
- Noël Wells as Blix ("Big Break")
- Sheryl Lee Ralph as Lynette Rhodes ("Single Black Idol")

== Episodes ==
=== Series overview ===
Season	Episodes	Originally released		
Season	Episodes	First released	Last released	Network
1	10	September 5, 2016	October 28, 2016	MTV & Facebook Watch
2	10	December 20, 2017	February 21, 2018	Facebook Watch

=== Season 1 (2016) ===
No. overall	No. in season	Title	Directed by	Written by	Original release date	US viewers (millions)
1	1	"Babysitting"	Chioke Nassor	Christian Lander & Christine Zander	September 5, 2016	0.34
2	2	"Breakfast with Derrick"	Steve Pink	Jackie Clarke	September 12, 2016	0.23
3	3	"Six Hour Braid"	Steve Pink	Grace Edwards	September 19, 2016	0.25
4	4	"Mistress"	Steve Pink	Grace Edwards	September 26, 2016	0.20
5	5	"Danny Boom"	Linda Mendoza	Christine Zander	October 3, 2016	0.18
6	6	"Stripper"	Linda Mendoza	Laura House	October 10, 2016	0.21
7	7	"Brother Visits"	Chioke Nassor	Chioke Nassor	October 21, 2016	0.19
8	8	"Quitting"	Linda Mendoza	Christine Zander & Nicole Byer	October 21, 2016	0.15
9	9	"Green Card"	Linda Wallem	Daniel Carter & Jeff Chlebus	October 28, 2016	N/A
10	10	"Big Break"	Linda Wallem	Christian Lander & Christine Zander	October 28, 2016	N/A

=== Season 2 (2017–18) ===
No. overall	No. in season	Title	Directed by	Written by	Original release date
11	1	"Nicole vs Veronica"	Linda Wallem	Christine Zander & Nicole Byer	December 20, 2017
12	2	"Thirsty Babies"	Linda Wallem	Grace Edwards	December 27, 2017
13	3	"Dead Mom Chicken Day"	Daniella Eisman	Ben Cory Jones	January 3, 2018
14	4	"Backseat Dating"	Daniella Eisman	Grant DeKernion	January 10, 2018
15	5	"Girl's Night Out"	Sam Bailey	Jenny Lee	January 17, 2018
16	6	"The Key Holder"	Sam Bailey	Daniel Carter & Jeff Chlebus	January 24, 2018
17	7	"Mr. Softy"	Linda Wallem	Nicole Byer & Crystal Jenkins	January 31, 2018
18	8	"Single Black Idol"	Linda Wallem	Christine Zander & Sara Dolin	February 7, 2018
19	9	"Wedding Smashers"	Linda Wallem	Jenny Lee & Grant DeKernion	February 14, 2018
20	10	"O Canada"	Linda Wallem	Christine Zander & Jenny Lee	February 21, 2018

== Production ==
=== Development ===
On April 21, 2016, it was announced that MTV had given the production a series order to consist of a first season of ten episodes. Executive producers were set to include Christine Zander, Christian Lander, and Avi Gilbert. Zander was also set to act as showrunner.

=== Cancellation ===
On February 9, 2017, it was announced that MTV had cancelled the series after one season. The show was cancelled alongside Mary + Jane, both of which had been developed and picked up before Chris McCarthy took over MTV in late October as president of MTV, VH1 and Logo.

=== Renewal ===
On June 12, 2017, it was announced that Facebook Watch had saved the series from cancellation and renewed it for a second season to consist of ten episodes. Christine Zander and Avi Gilbert returned as executive producer but a deal could not be reached with Christian Lander, who did not ultimately return for season two.

== Reception ==
The first season of the show received a mixed reception from critics upon its premiere. In a positive review, Flavorwire's Lara Zarum described the show as "a sweetly raunchy fable about finding your voice." She also praised the series for addressing "race and gender with a light but sharp touch." In a more negative review, Mitchel Broussard of WeGotThisCovered.com gave the series two-and-a-half stars out of five and commented that, "Although it has the noblest of inclusive intentions, Loosely Exactly Nicole ultimately falls flat because it doesn't present its progressive ideas in intriguing ways and - most problematic - it just isn't very funny." Common Sense Media's Melissa Camacho criticized the show when saying, "Nicole Byer's comic abilities are evident, but the show's writing is more silly than smart. As a result, it contains scenes (such as one that presents an Asian child in blackface) that cross the line from being politically charged to just being dim and offensive. Overall, the show has a lot of potential but doesn't quite reach it."

== See also ==
- List of original programs distributed by Facebook Watch
