= Survival of the Thickest =

2023 comedy-drama television series

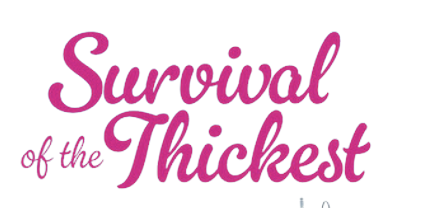
- Genre: Comedy drama
- Created by: Michelle Buteau; Danielle Sanchez-Witzel
- Based on: Survival of the Thickest by Michelle Buteau
- Developed by: Danielle Sanchez-Witzel
- Starring: Michelle Buteau; Tone Bell; Tasha Smith; Marouane Zotti
- Country of origin: United States
- Original language: English
- No. of seasons: 3
- No. of episodes: 24

Production
- Executive producers: Michelle Buteau; Danielle Sanchez-Witzel; Ravi Nandan; Alli Reich; Anne Hong; Linda Mendoza; Amy Aniobi; Grace Edwards
- Production location: New York City
- Running time: 22–28 minutes
- Production companies: Buteaupia; SanWitz Productions; A24

Original release
- Network: Netflix
- Release: July 13, 2023 – July 2, 2026

Survival of the Thickest is a comedy-drama television series co-created by Michelle Buteau and Danielle Sanchez Witzel for Netflix, based on a memoir of the same name. The series stars Buteau as a woman attempting to rebuild her life after a breakup. The series was released on July 13, 2023. In early 2024, Netflix announced that the show was renewed for a second season, which premiered on March 27, 2025. In May 2025, the series was renewed for a third and final season, which premiered on July 2, 2026.

== Premise ==
Recently turned single Black woman, Mavis Beaumont attempts to rebuild her life after "putting all of her eggs in one man's basket". As a struggling stylist, she is about to face various hurdles ahead as she tries to get herself together. Alongside her friends and relatives, she tries to survive and break through her problems, career and relationship-wise, with her "body-positive attitude, cute v-neck, and some lip-gloss".

== Cast ==
=== Main ===
- Michelle Buteau as Mavis Beaumont
- Tone Bell as Khalil Holland
- Tasha Smith as Marley (recurring season 1, main season 2)
- Marouane Zotti as Luca (recurring season 1-2, main season 3)

=== Recurring ===
- Anissa Felix as India (season 1)
- Garcelle Beauvais as Natasha Karina
- Taylor Selé as Jacque (season 1)
- Peppermint as a fictionalized version of herself
- Anthony Michael Lopez as Bruce
- Liza Treyger as Jade
- Becca Blackwell as Day
- Allan K. Washington as Trent
- Jerrie Johnson as Daphne (season 2)
- Alecsys Proctor-Turner as Nala
- Tika Sumpter as Simone (season 2)
- RonReaco Lee as Charles Renee
- Ronny Chieng as Donnie Wang (season 3)
- Ashley Romans as Imani (season 3)

=== Guest ===
- Nicole Byer as herself (season 1)
- Michelle Visage as Avery (season 1)
- Ambre Anderson as Dr. Britta (season 1)
- Sarah Cooper as Sydney (seasons 1-3)
- Anderson .Paak as himself (season 2)
- Monét X Change as a fictionalized version of herself (season 2)
- Monia Lea Rafaeli as Gabriella (season 2)
- Rolanda Watts as Adrienne (seasons 2-3)
- Wanda Sykes as Dr. Terri Lynn (season 3)
- Ashley Graham as herself (season 3)
- Jenna Lyons as herself (season 3)
- Ice-T as Charcoal Jackson (season 3)
- Kandi Burruss as Drea Jay (season 3)
- D. L. Hughley as Tariq (season 3)

== Episodes ==
=== Series overview ===
Season	Episodes	Originally released
1	8	July 13, 2023
2	8	March 27, 2025
3	8	July 2, 2026

=== Season 1 (2023) ===
No. overall	No. in season	Title	Directed by	Written by	Original release date
1	1	"Keep Your Plants Watered, Bitch."	Linda Mendoza	Michelle Buteau & Danielle Sanchez-Witzel	July 13, 2023
After a shocking discovery forced her to make a fresh start, a heartbroken Mavis lets loose during a night out and keeps it real with an old associate.
2	2	"Be a Bad Boss Bitch, Bitch!"	Linda Mendoza	Grace Edwards	July 13, 2023
While adjusting to life as a newly single woman, Mavis takes on a styling gig for a former supermodel who goes viral and inspires a new perspective.
3	3	"You Did What in Public, Bitch?"	Kim Nguyen	Solomon Georgio	July 13, 2023
Mavis springs into action when a drag queen has a wardrobe malfunction and a late-night date with a charming stranger turns into a sticky situation.
4	4	"Are You Crying, Bitch?"	Kim Nguyen	E. R. Fightmaster	July 13, 2023
While preparing for a high-profile wedding, Mavis juggles client demands and romantic dilemmas. Marley receives a tempting offer. Khalil shoots his shot.
5	5	"It's Any Given Sunday, Bitch!"	Amy Aniobi	Ian Edwards	July 13, 2023
A drop-in visit from an unexpected guest has Mavis questioning her decisions and long-distance relationship. A racist encounter catches Khalil off guard.
6	6	"Do the Right Thang, Bitch."	Amy Aniobi	Hillary Handelsman	July 13, 2023
Booked and busy, Mavis secured a dream job styling a lingerie launch celebrating body positivity but struggles to set boundaries when conflicts arise.
7	7	"Let it Out, Bitch!"	Kimmy Gatewood	Danielle Sanchez-Witzel & Julia Lindon	July 13, 2023
A health emergency pushes an anxious Mavis to find a release and weigh her options as her parents pressure her to give an old flame a second chance.
8	8	"For a Bigger Purpose, Bitch."	Kimmy Gatewood	Michelle Buteau	July 13, 2023
A tense dinner puts Khalil in the hot seat. While throwing a special teen prom, Mavis gets caught in a predicament and must decide what her heart wants.

=== Season 2 (2025) ===
No. overall	No. in season	Title	Directed by	Written by	Original release date
9	1	"When in Rome, Bitch!"	Kim Nguyen	Michelle Buteau	March 27, 2025
A lovestruck Mavis is swept off her feet in a sexy Roman rendezvous. However, unresolved decisions from the past may complicate her future with Luca.
10	2	"Dreams Do Come True at Afropunk, Bitch."	Kim Nguyen	Solomon Georgio	March 27, 2025
At the Afropunk festival, Mavis seizes the opportunity to elevate a celebrity's style, while Marley catches the eye of a charismatic councilwoman.
11	3	"You Can Heaux Your Own Way, Bitch."	Tasha Smith	Ian Edwards	March 27, 2025
Feeling frisky, Mavis expands her dating pool; Khalil works up the courage to seek guidance; Marley's competitive streak surfaces during a date.
12	4	"Mind Ya Business, Bitch!"	Tasha Smith	April Korto Quioh	March 27, 2025
Having outgrown her workspace, Mavis makes a risky change. Khalil's irresponsible mother lands him in a tight spot - until a lucrative way out appears.
13	5	"A Change Gon' Come, Bitch?"	Thembi Banks	E. R. Fightmaster & Hilary Handelsman	March 27, 2025
An anxious supermodel inspires Mavis to prove that sexiness has no expiration date; Marley copes with a rare emotion, vulnerability.
14	6	"The Category is Love, Bitch."	Thembi Banks	Grace Edwards	March 27, 2025
Mavis juggles one man too many at Peppermint's wedding; Khalil's artistic block threatens to derail everything he's worked for.
15	7	"You Best Come Correct, Bitch."	Amy Aniobi	Solomon Georgio & Curtis Cook	March 27, 2025
A shipment of ill-fitting dresses puts Mavis in conflict with an arrogant designer at the forefront of a movement for "oddie bodies" everywhere.
16	8	"It's Not A Mo'Ment, It's A Movement, Bitch!"	Amy Aniobi	Michelle Buteau	March 27, 2025
After stirring up controversy on a popular podcast, Mavis proposes an unlikely collaboration that could revolutionise plus size fashion.

=== Season 3 (2026) ===
No. overall	No. in season	Title	Directed by	Written by	Original release date
17	1	"Three's the Magic Number, Bitch."	Kim Nguyen	Michelle Buteau & Solomon Georgio	July 2, 2026
18	2	"Happy New Year's, Bitch!"	Kim Nguyen	Cameron Johnson & Kindsey L. Young	July 2, 2026
19	3	"Reclaiming My Time, Bitch."	Danielle Sanchez-Witzel	Ian Edwards	July 2, 2026
20	4	"C'est la vie, Bitch!"	Kim Nguyen	Amy Aniobi & Sherean D. Jones	July 2, 2026
21	5	"Good Grief, Bitch."	Michelle Buteau	Mnelik Belilgne	July 2, 2026
22	6	"Make It Work, Bitch."	Kim Nguyen	Solomon Georgio	July 2, 2026
23	7	"Ti Amo, Bitch!"	Amy Aniobi	Kemiyondo Coutinho	July 2, 2026
24	8	"It's Survival of the Thickest, Bitch."	Amy Aniobi	Michelle Buteau	July 2, 2026

== Production ==
=== Development ===
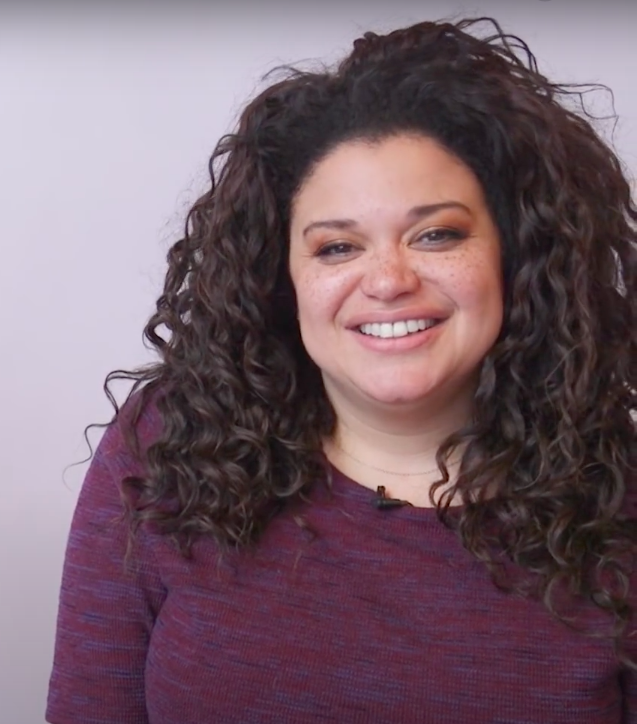
Michelle Buteau plays Mavis Beaumont, the lead role of Survival of the Thickest, in addition to being series co-creator and executive producer.

On January 24, 2022, Netflix announced an eight-episode television adaptation of Michelle Buteau's autobiographical essays Survival of the Thickest, with Buteau and Danielle Sanchez-Witzel as co-creators and executive producers. Witzel, who previously developed The Carmichael Show and co-produced New Girl, was revealed as the showrunner of the television series as part of her multi-year deal with Netflix. Ravi Nandan and Alli Reich of A24 also joined as co-executive producers. On August 31, 2022, Anne Hong from Mosaic was announced as co-executive producer. Meanwhile, Linda Mendoza was announced to be one of the series directors, and directed the first two episodes of the series. On May 14, 2025, Netflix renewed the series for a third and final season.

=== Casting ===
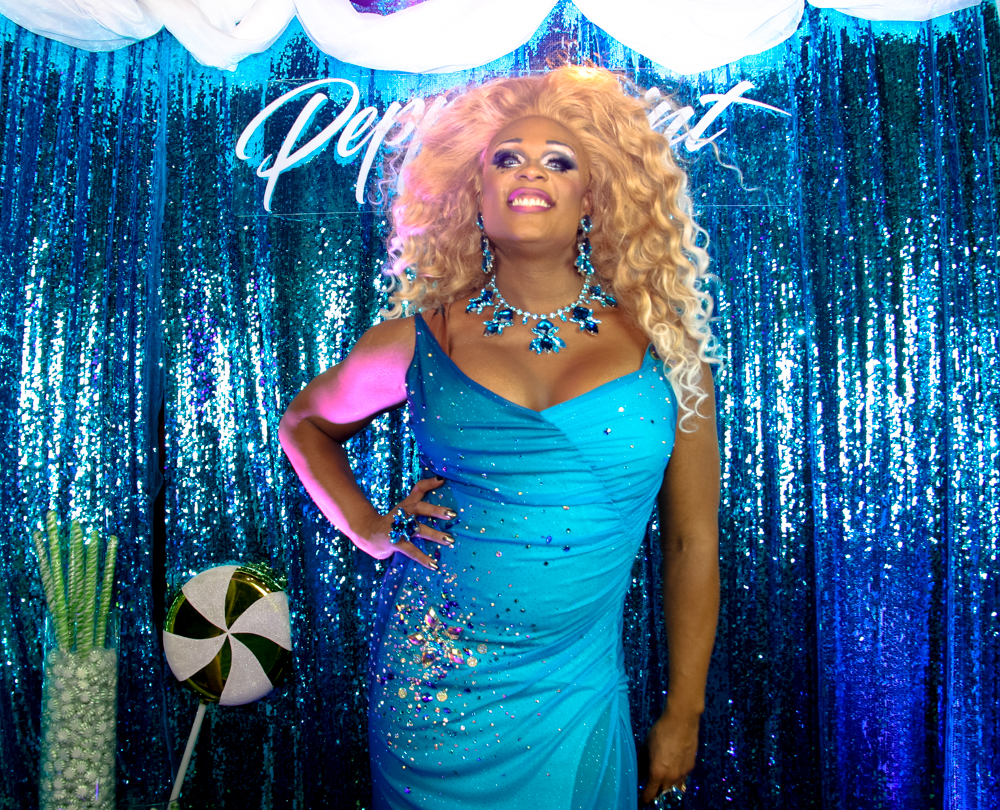
Peppermint stars in Survival of the Thickest as the character of the same name.

Michelle Buteau was announced as the series lead on January 24, 2022 alongside the television series announcement. On August 31, 2022, Tone Bell and Tasha Smith joined alongside Buteau as main cast members. On October 7, 2022, it was unveiled that Garcelle Beauvais, Anissa Felix, Peppermint, Taylor Selé, and Marouane Zotti joined the cast in recurring roles. Additionally, on October 18, 2022, Michelle Visage, Sarah Cooper, Anthony Michael Lopez, Liza Treyger, and Allan K Washington were revealed to have joined the cast.

In July 2024, for the second season, it was announced Smith had been promoted to series regular, with Anderson .Paak, Jonathan Chad Higginbotham, Deon Cole, Alecsys Proctor-Turner, Jerrie Johnson, Celisse, Rolonda Watts, Michael Rishawn, Tika Sumpter, Monét X Change, RonReaco Lee, and Yves Mathieu East set to guest star.

In December 2025, for the third season, it was announced Zotti had been promoted to series regular, with Wanda Sykes, D. L. Hughley, Ashley Graham, Ronny Chieng, Wyatt Cenac, Jenna Lyons, Ice-T, LaQuan Smith, Charles Harbison, and Ashley Romans set to guest star.

=== Filming ===
Principal photography of the series reportedly started on September 26, 2022, with New York revealed as one of the shooting locations. The filming reportedly concluded on November 20, 2022.

Principal photography for the second season commenced in July 2024.

The third and final season finish shooting on early February 2026.

== Release ==
The first trailer for the series launched on YouTube on May 25, 2023. Its second trailer was released a month later on June 24, 2023.

Survival of the Thickest premiered on Netflix on July 13, 2023.

== Reception ==
On the review aggregator website Rotten Tomatoes, the first season received a score of 86%, based on 21 reviews with an average rating of 6.7/10. On Metacritic, the series has a weighted average score of 66 out of 100, based on seven critics, indicating "generally favorable reviews".
