= Stephanie Danler =

American writer

- Born: 1983 (age 42–43)
- Occupation: Writer
- Citizenship: United States
- Education: Kenyon College; The New School (MFA)
- Notable works: Sweetbitter

Stephanie Danler (born 1983) is an American author. Her debut novel, Sweetbitter (2016), was a New York Times bestseller and was adapted into a television show by the same name. She released a memoir, Stray, in 2020.

== Life ==
Danler grew up in Seal Beach, California. At age 16, she moved to Boulder, Colorado, to live with her father. She attended Kenyon College in Ohio.

After moving to New York in 2006, Danler worked at Union Square Cafe for a year and earned an MFA in creative writing at the New School. She was working at Buvette, a restaurant in the West Village when she earned her first book deal.

In her early 30s, she moved to Los Angeles. As of May 2020, she was living in Silver Lake with her husband and son, and was expecting her second child.

Danler moved her family to Barcelona to work on Stray for a brief time, before returning to Los Angeles.

== Writing career ==
In 2014, Danler secured a six-figure, two-book publication deal with Knopf. She had sent her manuscript for Sweetbitter to an editor at Penguin – a regular customer at Buvette – who mentioned it to a colleague, who then acquired the book for Knopf.

Sweetbitter, a novel based on her experiences of working at Union Square Cafe, was published in 2016. It earned a starred review in Kirkus and was a New York Times bestseller. A review in The New Yorker said that "Danler deftly captures the unique power of hierarchy in the restaurant world, the role of drug and alcohol abuse, and the sense of borrowed grandeur that pervades the serving scene." A television adaptation (Sweetbitter), created by Danler, Stuart Zicherman, and Plan B Entertainment, premiered on Starz in 2018 and aired for two seasons. In 2019, Danler was granted the Robert B. Heilman award by the Sewanee Review for her review of Lisa Taddeo’s Three Women.

In 2020, she published a memoir, Stray, about "familial dysfunction and addiction" and "the entanglement of love and disappointment." Kirkus called it a "mostly moving text in which writing is therapeutic and family trauma is useful material." A review in The New York Times described it as "carefully concocted but unfermented." Marion Winik, writing for The Washington Post, gave Stray a mixed review with the comment: "Despite the author’s skills at observation and phrasemaking, the narrative manages to ping-pong between the two most dangerous possibilities in memoir: boring on one side, TMI on the other." A review from the New Yorker noted that the memoir is “unsparing” but “tempered with the tenderness of Danler’s language, and with her willingness to reserve her harshest rebukes for herself.”

== Works ==
- Sweetbitter (2016) ISBN 978-1-101-87594-0
- Stray: A Memoir (2020) ISBN 978-1-101-87596-4
