= Larry Bogdanow =

American architect (1947–2011)

- Born: February 24, 1947; Houston, Texas, United States
- Died: June 29, 2011 (aged 64)
- Education: Washington University in St. Louis; Pratt Institute
- Occupation: Architect

Larry Bogdanow (February 24, 1947 – June 29, 2011) was an American restaurant architect.

== Early life and education ==
Born in Houston, Texas, Bogdanow graduated from Washington University in St. Louis, Missouri, in 1970.

He moved to New York City and studied architecture at the Pratt Institute in Brooklyn, New York, where he earned a bachelor's degree in 1977.

== Career ==
He began his career working for the architectural firm Beyer Blinder Belle, but quickly left to establish his own firm, New City Designs, in 1978. That firm eventually became Bogdanow Partners Architects.

His firm became known for designing the architecture for several well-known restaurants in New York City, including the Union Square Cafe and many others including Savoy, Cub Room, Atlas, Follonico, Kelley & Ping, City Hall, Kin Khao, Union Pacific and The Screening Room. Outside of New York, his firm was responsible for the design of Rubicon in San Francisco, Lexington Square Cafe in Westchester and Adagio in Chicago.

== Death ==
Bogdanow died of a brain tumor on June 29, 2011, in Manhattan, aged 64.

== See also ==
- List of American architects
- List of people from Houston
- List of people from New York City
- List of Pratt Institute alumni
- List of Washington University alumni
