= Dollface =

American comedy television series (2019–2022)

- Genre: Comedy
- Created by: Jordan Weiss
- Starring: Kat Dennings; Brenda Song; Shay Mitchell; Esther Povitsky
- Music by: Jonathan Sadoff
- Country of origin: United States
- Original language: English
- No. of seasons: 2
- No. of episodes: 20

Production
- Executive producers: Ira Ungerleider; Jordan Weiss; Kat Dennings; Margot Robbie; Tom Ackerley; Brett Hedblom; Bryan Unkeless; Scott Morgan; Nicole King; Stephanie Laing; Matt Spicer; Josey McNamara; Michelle Nader
- Producers: Melanie J. Elin; Michael Gray; Solomon Georgio
- Cinematography: Bryce Fortner; Kevin Atkinson; Andy Rydzewski
- Editors: Sophie Corra; Tia Nolan; Ryan Cates; Taichi Erskine; Lise Angelica Johnson; Michael Scotti Jr.; Steve Watkins
- Camera setup: Single-camera
- Running time: 22–32 minutes
- Production companies: Clubhouse Pictures; LuckyChap Entertainment; Shaky Gun Productions; ABC Signature (Note: Known as ABC Signature Studios for season 1)

Original release
- Network: Hulu
- Release: November 15, 2019 – February 11, 2022

Dollface is an American comedy television series created by Jordan Weiss that premiered on November 15, 2019, on Hulu. It stars Kat Dennings, Brenda Song, Shay Mitchell, and Esther Povitsky. In January 2020, Hulu renewed the series for a second season, which was released on February 11, 2022. The series was canceled in May 2022 and was officially removed from Disney+ on May 26, 2023, amidst a Disney+ and Hulu content-removal purge, as part of a broader cost-cutting initiative under Disney CEO Bob Iger.

== Premise ==
The series follows "a young woman who – after being dumped by her longtime boyfriend – must deal with her own imagination in order to literally and metaphorically re-enter the world of women, and rekindle the female friendships she left behind."

== Cast and characters ==
=== Main ===
- Kat Dennings as Jules Wiley, a woman who works as a web designer at a wellness company called Woöm
- Brenda Song as Madison Maxwell, a PR expert and Jules' best friend from college who she recently reconnects with
- Shay Mitchell as Stella Cole, Jules' other best friend from college who she recently reconnects with
- Esther Povitsky as Izzy Levine, one of Jules' co-workers at Woöm who becomes friends with her

=== Recurring ===
- Beth Grant as Cat Lady, a woman with a cat's head who is a figment of Jules' imagination
- Connor Hines as Jeremy (season 1), Jules' ex-boyfriend
- Brianne Howey as Alison B., one of Jules' co-workers at Woöm
- Vella Lovell as Alison S. (season 1), one of Jules' co-workers at Woöm
- Malin Åkerman as Celeste, the CEO of Woöm
- Goran Visnjic as Colin (season 1), Madison's older boyfriend who is a doctor and Celeste's husband
- Matthew Gray Gubler as Wes, a veterinarian and Jules' potential love interest
- Jayson Blair as Liam (season 2), Izzy's new love interest and senior brand director at a company called Saaqq
- Lilly Singh as Liv (season 2), the owner of Frank Ginatra's Cocktail Lounge, Stella's new love interest, and a single mother with a young son
- Santina Muha as Sky (season 2), a new Woöm employee
- Owen Thiele as Q (season 2), a new Woöm employee
- Luke Cook as Fender (season 2), a musician who becomes Jules' new love interest; his real name is Josh
- Corinne Foxx as Ruby (season 2), an A&R executive and a friend from college who Jules feels uneasy about

In addition, Lincoln Reichel co-stars as Bruno, Liv's young son, for the second season.

=== Guest ===
- Dave Coulier as himself (season 1)
- Este Haim as Lemon (season 1), Stella's photographer friend
- Shelley Hennig as Ramona (season 1), Jeremy's sister
- Joey Lawrence as himself (season 1)
- Ritesh Rajan as Thomas (season 1), a food and culture reporter
- Tia Carrere as Teresa (season 1), Stella's mother
- Michael Angarano as Steve (season 1), a stripper
- Camilla Belle as Melyssa (season 1), Jeremy's date
- Macaulay Culkin as Dan Hackett (season 1), a man Stella met on a previous vacation; Madison accuses him of being the Bread Bowl Killer
- Derek Theler as Ryan (season 1), a man Jules has a fling with
- Ben Lawson as Oliver (season 1), a photographer Stella house-sits for
- Margot Robbie as Imelda (season 1), a spiritual guide
- Christina Pickles as Silvia Goldwyn (season 1), a feminist icon
- Nikki Reed as Bronwyn (season 1), an old friend of Stella's
- Shelby Rabara as Lucy (season 2), Wes' ex-girlfriend
- Poppy Liu as Lotus Dragon Bebe (season 2), an erotic content creator who becomes Madison's first client
- Iliza Shlesinger as herself (season 2)
- Michaela Conlin as Delphine (season 2)
- Chelsea Frei as Alison J. (season 2), the brand director at Alison B. and Alison S.'s lifestyle company
- Gilles Marini as Richard (season 2)
- Nathan Owens as Max (season 2)
- Rozzi as herself (season 2)
- Bleached as themselves (season 2)
- Jennifer Grey as Sharon Wiley (season 2), Jules' mother
- Chris Williams as Andre (season 2), Ruby's father
- Colton Haynes as Lucas (season 2), Bruno's father
- Don Stark as Craig Wiley (season 2), Jules' father
- Phantogram as themselves (season 2)

== Episodes ==
=== Series overview ===
Season	Episodes	Originally released
1	10	November 15, 2019
2	10	February 11, 2022

=== Season 1 (2019) ===
No. overall	No. in season	Title	Directed by	Written by	Original release date
1	1	"Guy's Girl"	Matt Spicer	Jordan Weiss	November 15, 2019
When Jules' longtime boyfriend Jeremy abruptly breaks up with her, she seeks to reconnect with estranged best friends Madison and Stella, but Madison feels that Jules neglected her friends during her relationship with Jeremy. Nevertheless, Jules convinces Madison and Stella to go with her to a party thrown by Woöm. The women are all having fun at the party, until Madison becomes upset when Jules fails to understand why women accompany each other to the bathroom. To make matters worse, Stella goes missing after entering a stranger's van. Jules runs into Jeremy outside the party, and when Madison sees the two talking, she assumes they are reconciling. Instead, Jules chooses to leave with Madison to search for Stella, bringing them closer together. They eventually find Stella at a restaurant with Dave Coulier.
2	2	"Homebody"	Stephanie Laing	Jordan Weiss	November 15, 2019
Jules realizes she needs to move out of the apartment she used to share with Jeremy. She seeks advice from Madison and Stella, but she inadvertently sparks an argument between the two due to their differing opinions—Stella suggests that Jules go traveling, while Madison encourages her to move into a larger apartment. After Jules accepts Izzy's offer to stay in her extra bedroom, Izzy ends up causing Madison and Stella's rift to escalate. Jules accidentally falls over and sprains her ankle. At the hospital, Madison and Stella resolve their differences and assure they love each other. Madison also reveals she is dating a doctor. Jules eventually sublets a guest house she had found earlier, which her friends help set up.
3	3	"Mystery Brunette"	Stephanie Laing	Sam Jarvis	November 15, 2019
Madison invites Jules to a client's launch party, but Jules discovers that Madison invited Stella first. Stella chose to attend Joey Lawrence's secret party instead, asking Jules not to tell Madison. At the launch party, Jules confronts Madison, who admits that she invited her boyfriend Colin first, but he wants to keep their relationship private. Jules accidentally discloses to a journalist that Madison's client, a vegan chef, secretly eats meat. In order to protect her client, Madison tells the journalist of Joey's party. There, Madison reveals to her friends that Colin is in the process of obtaining a divorce. Jeremy's sister Ramona calls Jules, saying she still wants Jules to be her bridesmaid. Jules lies to her friends about attending a cousin's upcoming wedding.
4	4	"Fun Friend"	Stephanie Laing	Grace Edwards	November 15, 2019
Stella invites Jules to go out with her and her wild, fun-loving mother, since she needs someone "boring" to keep things under control. During their night out, Stella announces she applied to business school, but her mother does not take her seriously and Jules passes out drunk. Determined to prove she is not boring, Jules takes Stella on a fun night out, but the two end up on a boat to Alaska. Tired of not being taken seriously, Stella behaves like the party girl people expect her to be, until Jules demands that the boat is turned around. Jules eventually accepts that she does not need to be as fun as Stella, while Stella makes plans for her future.
5	5	"Beauty Queen"	Stephanie Laing	Harper Dill	November 15, 2019
Colin suggests meeting Madison's friends over dinner. Madison urges Stella and Izzy to act mature in order to impress Colin. An uncomfortable Jules hosts Ramona's bachelorette party, which is cut short after Ramona's face is accidentally burned with a curling iron. Madison, Stella, and Izzy rush over to Jules' house unannounced in order to host the dinner party. As Colin arrives, the dinner party turns out to be awkward, unlike the sophisticated gathering Madison had envisioned. Jules' cat Turtle vomits after eating penis-shaped confections from the bachelorette party, prompting her to call Wes, a veterinarian she met earlier. Madison admits to Colin that she was trying to impress him, while Jules and Wes hit it off.
6	6	"History Buff"	Brennan Shroff	Nathaniel Stein	November 15, 2019
Stella reconnects with Dan, a man Madison disapproved of in the past. Madison accuses Dan of being the Bread Bowl Killer, who murdered a woman outside a Panera Bread restaurant years earlier. Jules spots Jeremy with Melyssa at a museum, moments before an earthquake forces the place into an emergency lockdown. She later decides to face Jeremy, but is arrested for looting the museum. On the way to the museum, Madison and Stella argue as the former insists on proving Dan is the killer. Dan proves his innocence by confessing he was masturbating in his car on the night of the murder, prompting the women to kick him off. Jeremy reveals to Jules he felt guilty for once refusing to visit a museum with her when they were together, which is why he is at the museum with Melyssa. Jules is released and leaves with her friends.
7	7	"F*** Buddy"	Alethea Jones	Hallie Cantor	November 15, 2019
When Jules accidentally likes one of Melyssa's Instagram pictures, her friends encourage her to move on from Jeremy by engaging in casual sex with someone who is not "boyfriend material"; Jules does so with an attractive man named Ryan. Stella worries that her casual sexual partner, Oliver, believes that they are in a committed relationship—which later turns out to be a misunderstanding on Stella's part. Madison is upset when her attempts to make Colin jealous backfire. Jules' friends disapprove of her upon discovering that Wes spent the night at her place, prompting Madison to take the group to a college friend's birthday party. Jules runs into Wes at the party, and she admits that while she is interested in him, she is not ready for a new relationship. When Colin picks up an intoxicated Madison, he confesses his love for her.
8	8	"Mama Bear"	Alethea Jones	Hallie Cantor	November 15, 2019
Jules reluctantly agrees to attend Woöm's annual wellness retreat at Celeste's Malibu home. There, Jules discovers that Colin is Celeste's husband, causing her to vomit. After Izzy presumes that Jules is pregnant, Jules returns home and takes a pregnancy test, which comes back negative. Upon facing Madison, Jules becomes nervous and lies about being pregnant. When an intoxicated Stella makes a scene at USC after learning she was not accepted into business school, Jules and Madison come to her aid. As Madison discovers Jules' negative pregnancy test, Jules discloses that Colin is still married to Celeste, but Madison refuses to believe it and instead lashes out at Jules. Following a tearful argument, Madison leaves.
9	9	"Feminist"	Brennan Shroff	Jordan Weiss	November 15, 2019
In a dream sequence inspired by The Wizard of Oz, Celeste becomes suspicious after finding a pair of red shoes in her beach house. In order to cover for Madison, Jules claims the shoes for herself, though Celeste persistently pressures Jules into revealing the truth. At the Women's March, Jules is joined by Stella, Madison (who is still in denial about Colin's marriage), and Izzy as they set out to find the event's speaker, Sylvia Goldwyn. Upon reaching Sylvia, each of the four women asks her questions related to feminism, to which Sylvia responds that feminism does not have a single definition. Celeste apologizes to Jules for involving her in her marital problems. Awakening from her dream, Jules receives a voice message from Jeremy, asking if she is bringing a date to Ramona's wedding party and informing her that he is bringing Melyssa.
10	10	"Bridesmaid"	Ira Ungerleider	Jordan Weiss	November 15, 2019
Jules travels to Mexico for Ramona's wedding. After Stella and Izzy convince Madison to make amends with Jules, they arrive at Jules' hotel room shortly after Jeremy suggests a reconciliation. Madison becomes furious upon discovering that Jules lied about attending a cousin's wedding, while Jules feels constantly judged and ends up lashing out at her friends, prompting them to leave. Stella announces to Madison and Izzy that she has been accepted into business school and plans to move to Philadelphia. The next day, the three women return to the wedding, as Jules and Madison apologize to each other. Jules rejects Jeremy's offer of reconciliation, as she does not want to return to being the person she was when they were dating. When Colin and Celeste appear, Jules grabs a microphone and exposes Colin as a cheater. The foursome steal Ramona's wedding car and drive back to Los Angeles.

=== Season 2 (2022) ===
No. overall	No. in season	Title	Directed by	Written by	Original release date
11	1	"Travel Agent"	Nisha Ganatra	Jordan Weiss	February 11, 2022
After a year in quarantine due to the COVID-19 pandemic, Jules and Madison prepare to return to the workforce. After completing a year at Wharton, Stella returns to Los Angeles for an internship at a bank. Jules, expecting to be fired following Celeste's wedding debacle, is offered a promotion by Celeste to be her right-hand woman, while Madison is fired from her PR firm. The foursome attend a 30 Under 30 party, where Izzy's new boyfriend Liam is being honored. Jules, Madison, and Stella have an awkward run-in with an acquaintance from college, while Izzy feels insecure after two partygoers imply that Liam is too attractive for her. Following Madison's advice, Jules notifies Celeste that she is accepting the promotion.
12	2	"Right-Hand Woman"	Nisha Ganatra	Michelle Nader	February 11, 2022
In addition to reveling in her promotion at Woöm, Jules learns that Wes recently broke up with his girlfriend Lucy after running into him. On the other hand, Madison—who has started her own PR firm—discovers that Colin is engaged and is eventually rejected by her first potential client. Dissatisfied with her internship, Stella wanders into a dive bar called Frank Ginatra's Cocktail Lounge and quickly bonds with its owner, Liv, who is considering selling the bar due to debts. Stella suggests revamping Frank Ginatra's into a bar for women, and Liv approves the idea. Wes texts Jules asking to see her soon, which she happily accepts. While helping Lucy move out, Wes accidentally crashes into a delivery robot with Lucy in the passenger seat, injuring her hand.
13	3	"Boss Lady"	Yulin Kuang	Josephine Green Zhang	February 11, 2022
After an injured Lucy moves back in with Wes, Jules insists that she and Wes wait to have sex until Lucy moves out. As they begin renovations to the bar, Stella and Liv kiss and later have sex, although Liv worries about mixing business and pleasure. Madison meets a prospective client, an edgy OnlyFans star named Lotus Dragon Bebe, but when Madison suggests that Bebe soften her image, Bebe dismisses Madison as uptight. Izzy and Liam present their collaborative project, a unisex genital spray, to Jules before they plan to pitch it to Celeste. Jules believes that Celeste will not approve their idea, disappointing Izzy. Jules later assures Izzy that she was trying to protect her, and plans to talk to Celeste about giving Izzy more responsibility. In order to prove herself to Bebe, Madison attends an erotic dance class and, along with Stella and Izzy, performs a dance routine. Impressed, Bebe hires Madison as her publicist. Jules gives in to her sexual frustration and sleeps with Wes.
14	4	"Power Player"	Adriana Robles	Liz Elverenli	February 11, 2022
Jules meets an attractive musician, Fender, and the two hit it off. Frustrated with Wes, who is constantly tending to Lucy, Jules asks Fender out on a date. At Fender's invitation, Jules and Madison attend his concert that night. While Madison reconnects with Ruby, an old friend from college, Jules spends time with Fender. When Wes calls Jules during her date, she admits to Fender that she asked him out to make Wes jealous, but Fender is understanding. Meanwhile, Stella feels a power imbalance in her sexual and professional relationship with Liv, and Izzy feels overwhelmed when Celeste gives her more responsibility than expected. Jules texts Fender asking him out on another date.
15	5	"Miss Codependent"	Zoe Cassavetes	Sam Jarvis	February 11, 2022
Jealous of Madison's budding friendship with Ruby, Jules brings her friends together to revive Codependence Day, a holiday they invented in college. Jules is then forced to house-sit Celeste's Malibu house, which becomes the new venue for Codependence Day. Madison refuses to go due to her history with Colin, but eventually relents, arriving at Celeste's house with Ruby. When Ruby overhears Jules' phone conversation with Wes (whose plans to sever all ties with Lucy have backfired), Jules asks Ruby not to tell Madison that she has been seeing Wes. Later, however, a paranoid Jules wrongly accuses Ruby of telling Madison about Wes, exposing her own secret. Madison, in turn, accuses Jules of lying to her. Showing up unexpectedly, Celeste makes peace with Madison, declaring they were both deceived by Colin. Jules and Madison make amends, and the former realizes she needs to move on from Wes.
16	6	"Space Cadet"	Kris Rey	Liz Elverenli	February 11, 2022
Izzy worries that Liam is considering breaking up with her after he cancels plans to take her on an upcoming trip with his college friends and their significant others. Jules, Izzy, Sky, and Q attend a wellness summit as Woöm ambassadors, but have an unpleasant run-in with Alison B., who left Woöm to co-found a lifestyle brand with Alison S. Jules also comes across a potential job opportunity at CAMLA. Stella's plans for a night of sex with Liv are interrupted when Bruno, who was spending the weekend with his father, returns home earlier than expected. Jules and Madison go on a double date with Fender and his friend Max. Liam tells Izzy he has booked their own cabin for the trip, and although he insists he never thought about breaking up with her, she decides to end their relationship as it constantly makes her feel insecure.
17	7	"Molly"	Emma Westenberg	Solomon Georgio	February 11, 2022
Jules and Madison plan a trip to Greece to celebrate their upcoming 30th birthdays. Ruby invites the foursome to an all-female music festival, granting them VIP passes. Annoyed by Ruby's presence, Jules initially declines, but ultimately changes her mind. Upon arriving at the festival, Jules' wristband does not work. When she attempts to sneak in, she is taken to "festival jail", which she escapes with the help of a teenage girl. Jules finally finds the rest of the group, but is dismayed to learn that Madison has canceled their birthday trip in favor of a work trip to Australia with Ruby, sparking an argument between Jules and Madison. Meanwhile, Izzy struggles to process her breakup, and Stella realizes her partying days are behind her.
18	8	"Homecoming Queen"	Alethea Jones	Liz Elverenli & Jordan Weiss	February 11, 2022
Jules and Madison have not been on speaking terms since the festival. A visit to her parents' house forces Jules to relive her childhood traumas. Ruby introduces Madison to her father, a famous music mogul, who constantly ridicules Ruby's perceived lack of work ethic. Humiliated, Ruby decides to quit her father's label and consequently cancels the Australia trip. When Madison emphasizes that the trip would be a major opportunity for her, Ruby accuses Madison of using her to further her own career. In response, Madison points out that Ruby was the one showering her with elaborate gifts. During a spa weekend, Alison J. attempts to poach Izzy with a job offer at Alison B. and Alison S.'s company, while warning Izzy not to trust Celeste. Stella confesses to Liv that she might return to Wharton in case their bar does not succeed, causing tension between them.
19	9	"Princess Charming"	Jennifer Arnold	Jordan Weiss	February 11, 2022
Jules lands a job interview at CAMLA. Sky and Q warn Jules that Colin, determined to prove that Celeste lied about how much Woöm is worth, has offered to invest in the Alisons' company in exchange for damaging information about Woöm. To do so, the Alisons plan to manipulate Izzy in order to access financial documents on her work laptop. After failing to convince Izzy that she is in trouble, Jules, Madison, and Stella fly to Napa on a private jet to rescue her. By the time they arrive, Izzy has already given her laptop to Alison J. willingly. As they eventually find Izzy in her hotel room, she confirms that Celeste is not lying. A morose Izzy also admits that she has been struggling with self-doubt. Jules, Madison, and Stella manage to lift Izzy's spirits, and the group return to Los Angeles in time for Jules' job interview.
20	10	"Birthday Girl"	Alethea Jones	Michelle Nader & Jordan Weiss	February 11, 2022
While waiting to hear back from CAMLA, Jules informs Celeste that she is quitting Woöm. However, Jules later discovers that her new job is no longer available. In order to ask for her job back, Jules attempts to reach Celeste at the airport before she leaves for the Maldives, but ultimately realizes that she needs to move forward. Izzy asks Liam for another chance, and the two reconcile. The group attend the opening of Stella and Liv's bar, The Gi Spot, which proves a success. Jules and Fender's romance evolves, Madison and Ruby make amends, and Izzy is chosen as Celeste's new right-hand woman. Stella tells Liv she is ready to fully commit to their relationship, but Liv insists that they maintain a strictly professional relationship, for the sake of Bruno. Since their birthday trip to Greece did not come to fruition, Jules, accompanied by Stella and Izzy, surprises Madison with a virtual trip to Greece, which Jules designed in her garage.

== Production ==
=== Development ===
On November 17, 2017, it was announced that Hulu had given the production a pilot order. The series was created by Jordan Weiss who was also expected to write for the series and serve as an executive producer alongside Stephanie Laing, Margot Robbie, Brett Hedblom, Bryan Unkeless, Scott Morgan, Nicole King, and Kat Dennings. In addition to producing, Laing was also set to direct the pilot episode as well. Production companies slated to be involved with the series included LuckyChap Entertainment and Clubhouse Pictures.

On November 2, 2018, it was announced that Hulu had given the production a series order for a first season consisting of ten episodes. Additional executive producers were reported to include Ira Ungerleider, Tom Ackerley, and Matt Spicer. Ungerleider was also set to serve as the series' showrunner and Spicer as the director of the first episode, replacing the previously announced Laing. Further production companies involved with the series were now expected to include ABC Signature Studios. The series premiered on November 15, 2019. On January 17, 2020, the series was renewed for a second season. On May 10, 2022, the series was canceled after two seasons.

=== Casting ===
Alongside the pilot order announcement on November 2, 2018, it was confirmed that Kat Dennings had been cast in the production's lead role. On January 31, 2019, it was announced that Brenda Song and Lex Scott Davis had joined the main cast in leading roles. On February 19, 2019, Esther Povitsky joined the cast of the series in a lead role. On April 10, 2019, it was announced Shay Mitchell had joined the cast of the series, replacing Davis. On June 4, 2019, it was announced that Goran Visnjic would join the cast in a recurring role. In July 2021, Jayson Blair, Corinne Foxx, and Luke Cook joined the cast in recurring roles for the second season. On September 17, 2021, Chelsea Frei was cast in a recurring capacity for the second season.

=== Filming ===
Principal photography for the first season wrapped on June 25, 2019. Filming for the second season concluded on October 15, 2021.

== Release ==
The series premiered on November 15, 2019, on Hulu in the United States, and on Crave in Canada. In selected international territories, the series premiered on Disney+ under the dedicated streaming hub Star as an original series, on March 5, 2021. On Disney+, Dollface episodes are debuting on a weekly basis, and in Latin America the series released on August 31, 2021, on Star+. The ten-episode second season was released on February 11, 2022, on Hulu.

The series, along with over 50 others, was removed from Hulu, Disney+ and Star+ on May 26, 2023 as part of an ongoing cost-cutting initiative brought on by Disney CEO Bob Iger.

== Reception ==
=== Viewership ===
Whip Media, which tracks viewership data for over 1 million daily users worldwide of its TV Time app, calculated that Dollface was the fifth most-anticipated returning show of February 2022. It later indicated that Dollface was the tenth most-streamed show in the U.S. for the week of February 13 and rose to the fifth position during the week of February 20, 2022.

=== Critical response ===
The first season holds an approval rating of 59% based on 27 reviews on Rotten Tomatoes, with an average rating of 5.8/10. The site's critical consensus reads: "Dollface has all of the right parts: a talented cast, a promising premise, and plenty of surreal intrigue—if only its shallow vision of feminism didn't undermine them." On Metacritic, it has a weighted average score of 54 out of 100 based on reviews from 13 critics, indicating "mixed or average reviews".

The second season has an approval rating of 56% based on 9 reviews on Rotten Tomatoes, with an average rating of 4.8/10. On Metacritic, it has a weighted average score of 49 out of 100 based on reviews from 4 critics, indicating "mixed or average reviews".

=== Accolades ===
Year	Award	Category	Nominee(s)	Result	Ref.
2021	California on Location Awards	Location Team of the Year - Half Hour Television	Kyle Sucher, Danny Finn, Josh Vignery, Scott Kradolfer, Nick Bell, and Dan Dawson	Won	
2022	Hollywood Critics Association TV Awards	Best Actress in a Streaming Series, Comedy	Kat Dennings	Nominated	
