= Jerrie Johnson =

American actress (born 1994)

- Born: January 29, 1994 (age 32)
- Occupation: Actress
- Years active: 2020–present
- Spouse: Dria Brown

Jerrie Johnson is an American actress. She is best known for playing Tye Reynolds in the sitcom Harlem and Daphne in the comedy drama series Survival of the Thickest.

== Early life ==
Johnson is from Philadelphia, Pennsylvania. Johnson graduated from Pennsylvania State University in 2016 with a bachelor of arts in theatre and a minor in African American studies. She earned a master of fine arts at the American Conservatory Theater in 2019.

== Career ==
Johnson made her acting debut on the drama series Good Trouble where she portrayed Tye. Her first big role came playing Tye Reynolds in the sitcom Harlem. She had a recurring role as Daphne on the comedy drama series Survival of the Thickest. On June 30th 2025 she took part in Soul Soirée’s Monologue Slam in Brooklyn alongside Dominique Thorne and Daniel J. Watts.

== Personal life ==
Johnson is a lesbian and is married to art doula Dria Brown. They met at a post-show panel for the play Confederates by Dominique Morisseau. They started dating in 2022 before Johnson proposed to her in Montego Bay.

== Filmography ==
=== Film ===
Year	Title	Role	Notes
2021	Mother's Milk	Sweetbird	Short

=== Television ===
Year	Title	Role	Notes
2020	Good Trouble	Tye	2 episodes
2024	Influenced	Herself	
2021-2025	Harlem	Tye Reynolds	24 episodes
2025	Survival of the Thickest	Daphne	6 episodes
