= Harlem (TV series) =

American comedy television series

- Genre: Comedy
- Created by: Tracy Oliver
- Starring: Meagan Good; Grace Byers; Shoniqua Shandai; Jerrie Johnson; Tyler Lepley
- Country of origin: United States
- Original language: English
- No. of seasons: 3
- No. of episodes: 24

Production
- Executive producers: Dave Becky; Kim Lessing; Tracy Oliver; Amy Poehler; Mimi Valdés; Pharrell Williams
- Producers: David Bausch; Britt Matt; Shani Saxon
- Cinematography: Matt Edwards
- Editors: Christian Kinnard; Kate Pedatella
- Running time: 30 minutes
- Production companies: Tracy Yvonne Productions; Paper Kite Productions; 3 Arts Entertainment; Universal Television; Amazon MGM Studios (Note: Credited as Amazon Studios for seasons 1–2.)

Original release
- Network: Amazon Prime Video
- Release: December 3, 2021 – February 6, 2025

Harlem is an American comedy television series created and executive produced by Tracy Oliver that aired on Amazon Prime Video from December 3, 2021, to February 6, 2025. In February 2022, the series was renewed for a second season, which premiered on February 3, 2023. In December 2023, the series was renewed for a third and final season, which premiered on January 23, 2025.

It received generally favorable reviews by critics, earning nominations at the Black Reel Awards and NAACP Image Awards, both for direction and cast of actors.

== Synopsis ==
The series follows four female friends who met while attending New York University and are now in their thirties, living in Harlem, as they try to balance love, life, and their careers as working professionals.

== Cast ==
=== Main cast ===
- Meagan Good as Camille Parks
- Grace Byers as Quinn Joseph
- Shoniqua Shandai as Angie Wilson
- Jerrie Johnson as Tye Reynolds
- Tyler Lepley as Ian Walker

=== Recurring cast ===
- Whoopi Goldberg as Dr. Elise Pruitt
- Jasmine Guy as Patricia Joseph
- Bevy Smith as Aunt Tammy
- Juani Feliz as Isabela Benitez-Santiago
- Logan Browning as Porshia
- Jonathan Burke as Eric
- Kadeem Ali Harris as Brandon
- Sullivan Jones as Jameson Royce
- Andrea Martin as Robin Goodman (season 1)
- Robert Ri'chard as Shawn (season 1)
- Erika Henningsen as Kate (season 1)
- Kate Rockwell as Anna Sharp (season 2)
- Luke Forbes as Michael (seasons 2–3)
- Joie Lee as Deborah Parks (seasons 2–3)
- Rachel True as Aimee (season 2)
- Trai Byers as Keith (season 2)
- Gail Bean as Eva Lewis (season 3)

=== Guest appearances ===
- Godfrey as Cole Thompson (season 1)
- Rick Fox as Phil Joseph (season 2)
- Sherri Shepherd as Sonya Wilson (season 2)
- Lil Rel Howery as Freddie Wilson (season 2)
- Countess Vaughn as Herself (season 2)
- D. Woods as Karla (season 2)

== Production ==
The project was first announced on July 8, 2019, as an untitled half-hour comedy series. Filming was delayed due to the COVID-19 pandemic. Creator Tracy Oliver said she had the idea for the show because she felt there weren't a lot of "Black female friendship stories on the air," and she wanted to portray people in their thirties who were still searching for their path in life. She based the show in part on her own experiences. The series is executive produced by Oliver, Amy Poehler, Kim Lessing, Dave Becky, Pharrell Williams, and Mimi Valdés.

On January 14, 2020, it was announced that Meagan Good, Grace Byers, Jerrie Johnson, and Shoniqua Shandai had been cast in the series, and that Malcolm D. Lee would direct the first two episodes. On February 17, 2021, it was announced that Whoopi Goldberg and Jasmine Guy would be joining the show in recurring roles. On March 4, 2021, it was announced that Andrea Martin, Robert Ri'chard, Juani Feliz, Kate Rockwell, and Sullivan Jones would also have recurring roles. On February 17, 2022, Amazon renewed the series for a second season. On December 6, 2023, Amazon renewed the series for a third season, which premiered on January 23, 2025.

== Episodes ==
=== Series overview ===
Season	Episodes	Originally released	
Season	Episodes	First released	Last released
1	10	December 3, 2021	
2	8	February 3, 2023	February 24, 2023
3	6	January 23, 2025	February 6, 2025

=== Season 1 (2021) ===
No. overall	No. in season	Title	Directed by	Written by	Original release date
1	1	"Pilot"	Malcolm D. Lee	Tracy Oliver	December 3, 2021
2	2	"Saturn Returns"	Malcolm D. Lee	Tracy Oliver	December 3, 2021
3	3	"Rainbow Sprinkles"	Linda Mendoza	Azie Dungey	December 3, 2021
4	4	"Winter Solstice"	Linda Mendoza	Njeri Brown	December 3, 2021
5	5	"Boundaries"	Linda Mendoza	Travon Free	December 3, 2021
6	6	"Cuffing Season"	Stacey Muhammad	Jess Watson	December 3, 2021
7	7	"The Strong Black Woman"	Stacey Muhammad	Britt Matt	December 3, 2021
8	8	"Five Years Ago"	Linda Mendoza	Azie Dungey & Sean Buckley	December 3, 2021
9	9	"Secrets"	Neema Barnette	Aeryn Michelle Williams	December 3, 2021
10	10	"Once Upon a Time in Harlem"	Neema Barnette	Tracy Oliver & Scott King	December 3, 2021

=== Season 2 (2023) ===
No. overall	No. in season	Title	Directed by	Written by	Original release date
11	1	"Takesie Backsies"	Linda Mendoza	Tracy Oliver & Scott King	February 3, 2023
12	2	"If You Can't Say Anything Nice…"	Meagan Good	Britt Matt	February 3, 2023
13	3	"As Assist from the Sidelines"	Stacey Muhammad	Aeryn Michelle Williams & Jessica Watson	February 10, 2023
14	4	"Baby and the Bath Water"	Linda Mendoza	Nicole Drespel & Morgan Collins	February 10, 2023
15	5	"Pride"	Linda Mendoza	Britt Matt & Sean Buckley	February 17, 2023
16	6	"Out of the Deadpan and into the Fire"	Shea William Vanderpoort	Alisha Cowan & Thembi Ford	February 17, 2023
17	7	"Fall Back to Rumspringa Forward"	Shea William Vanderpoort	Anaya Byrd & Katie Tibaldi	February 24, 2023
18	8	"Joy, Joy, Joy, Joy"	Stacey Muhammad	Tracy Oliver & Brandon K. Hynes	February 24, 2023

=== Season 3 (2025) ===
No. overall	No. in season	Title	Directed by	Written by	Original release date
19	1	"Ex...pecting"	Stacey Muhammad	Story by : Tracy Oliver & Britt Matt; Teleplay by : Scott King	January 23, 2025
20	2	"Fallopian Blues"	Stacey Muhammad	Aeryn Michelle Williams & Ayana Byrd	January 23, 2025
21	3	"Can We Talk…For A Minute"	Tasha Smith	Azie Dungey & Alisha Cowan	January 30, 2025
22	4	"Foot Rub"	Shea William Vanderpoort	Aeryn Michelle Williams & Azie Dungey	January 30, 2025
23	5	"Fear Factor"	Tasha Smith	Britt Matt	February 6, 2025
24	6	"Dear Harlem"	Shea William Vanderpoort	Tracy Oliver	February 6, 2025

== Release ==
The trailer was released on November 3, 2021. All 10 episodes of the series' first season premiered on Prime Video on December 3, 2021.

== Reception ==
Harlem received positive reviews. According to the review aggregation website Rotten Tomatoes, the series' first season has a 96% approval rating based on 26 critics' reviews, with an average rating of 6.9/10. The website's critics consensus reads: "Harlem is a delight that is often wise about friendly foibles, aided by a terrific cast whose snappy repartee immediately shines." Metacritic assigned the first season a weighted average score of 77 out of 100 based on 12 reviews, indicating "generally favorable reviews".

=== Accolades ===
Award	Year	Category	Recipient(s)	Result	Ref.
Black Reel Awards	2023	Outstanding Comedy Series	Harlem (given to Tracy Oliver)	Nominated	
Black Reel Awards	2023	Outstanding Lead Performance in a Comedy Series	Meagan Good	Nominated	
Black Reel Awards	2023	Outstanding Guest Performance in a Comedy Series	Whoopi Goldberg	Nominated	
NAACP Image Awards	2022	Outstanding Comedy Series	Harlem	Nominated	
NAACP Image Awards	2022	Outstanding Directing in a Comedy Series	Neema Barnette (for "Once Upon A Time in Harlem")	Nominated	
NAACP Image Awards	2024	Outstanding Comedy Series	Harlem	Nominated	
NAACP Image Awards	2024	Outstanding Actress in a Comedy Series	Meagan Good	Nominated	
NAACP Image Awards	2024	Outstanding Supporting Actor in a Comedy Series	Tyler Lepley	Nominated	
NAACP Image Awards	2024	Outstanding Supporting Actress in a Comedy Series	Shoniqua Shandai	Nominated	
GLAAD Media Awards	2022	Outstanding New TV Series	Harlem	Nominated	
GLAAD Media Awards	2024	Outstanding Comedy Series	Harlem	Nominated	
