= Sweetbitter =

Novel by Stephanie Danler

- Author: Stephanie Danler
- Language: English
- Publisher: Alfred A. Knopf
- Publication date: 24 May 2016
- Publication place: United States

Sweetbitter is a 2016 novel by American writer Stephanie Danler, published by Alfred A. Knopf. It is Danler's first published book. It was written over a seven-year period, and, despite glowing press before its release, received mixed reviews.

The book is based in part on Danler's experience as a waitress in New York City.

== History and background ==
The novel was written while Danler was a waitress at Union Square Cafe and an MFA student at nearby university The New School. Later, while a waitress at Buvette, another restaurant in New York City, she met Peter Gethers, a publisher, and informed him that she had recently finished a book. After Gethers recommended the manuscript to a friend, Danler received a six-figure contract for two novels at Alfred A. Knopf. Danler is one of a cohort of authors to receive large contracts in exchange for multi-book deals. Others include Emma Cline and Imbolo Mbue.

Danler has stated that, although she has much in common with Tess, the novel's protagonist, Tess "quickly became a character, and is in many ways much better and much worse at life than I was at that age" and is not entirely based on her. She has also stated that the novel's other two central characters, Jake and Simone, are entirely fictional. Danler has compared writing her first novel to her experiences in the restaurant world.

== Plot summary ==
Tess is twenty-two when she packs up her things in her car and moves from Ohio to New York City. Knowing nothing and no one she stumbles her way into a job at a semi-prestigious restaurant as a back waitress. The servers and staff are exceptionally tight-knit and take their jobs extremely seriously and Tess does as well. Tess is also drawn to Jake, one of the bartenders, and Simone, a senior server who takes Tess under her wing and begins to train her palate and teach her about wines so that she might one day be able to become a server.

Although they initially dislike her, the staff members soon warm up to Tess and she joins them in their hedonistic lifestyle. Nevertheless she longs to be included in Simone and Jake's more exclusive circle and comes to learn that they are both from Cape Cod, they knew each other before the restaurant, and Simone treats him like family. Tess aggressively pursues Jake but he refrains from sleeping with her which Tess comes to realize is because of Simone. When Simone walks in on Tess licking Jake after he cut himself, Simone says she will speak to Jake and he finally begins sleeping with Tess.

Tess is initially happy to be involved with Jake and with Simone. Gradually her closeness to the two turns to bitterness after she discovers that they have matching tattoos neither one will talk about and that Simone raised Jake from the time he was eight. She also loses respect for Simone after realizing that at 37 she is chained to the restaurant. Hers is a specialty whose skills will transfer nowhere, and her beauty is quickly fading.

When the restaurant is closed by the health inspectors, Tess goes upstairs to the general manager's office and accidentally discovers that Simone and Jake have planned a one-month vacation to France for his birthday without telling her. She gets blackout drunk and tries to confront Simone and Jake, but they fail to respond to her. The next time she sees them she confronts Simone, mocking her for being irrelevant. She also tries to convince Jake that his relationship with Simone is unhealthy and asks him to quit for her but though he admits he is tempted he ultimately rejects her.

Feeling defeated Tess goes to speak to the general manager, Howard, to convince him to give her one of the prestigious server jobs even though she knows that Simone will try to block her promotion. Howard has sex with her in return for the promotion; however, it turns out to be a transfer to one of their sister restaurants which Tess refuses. She tells Simone that she instead will try to work at a wine shop and Simone encourages the move.

== Reception ==
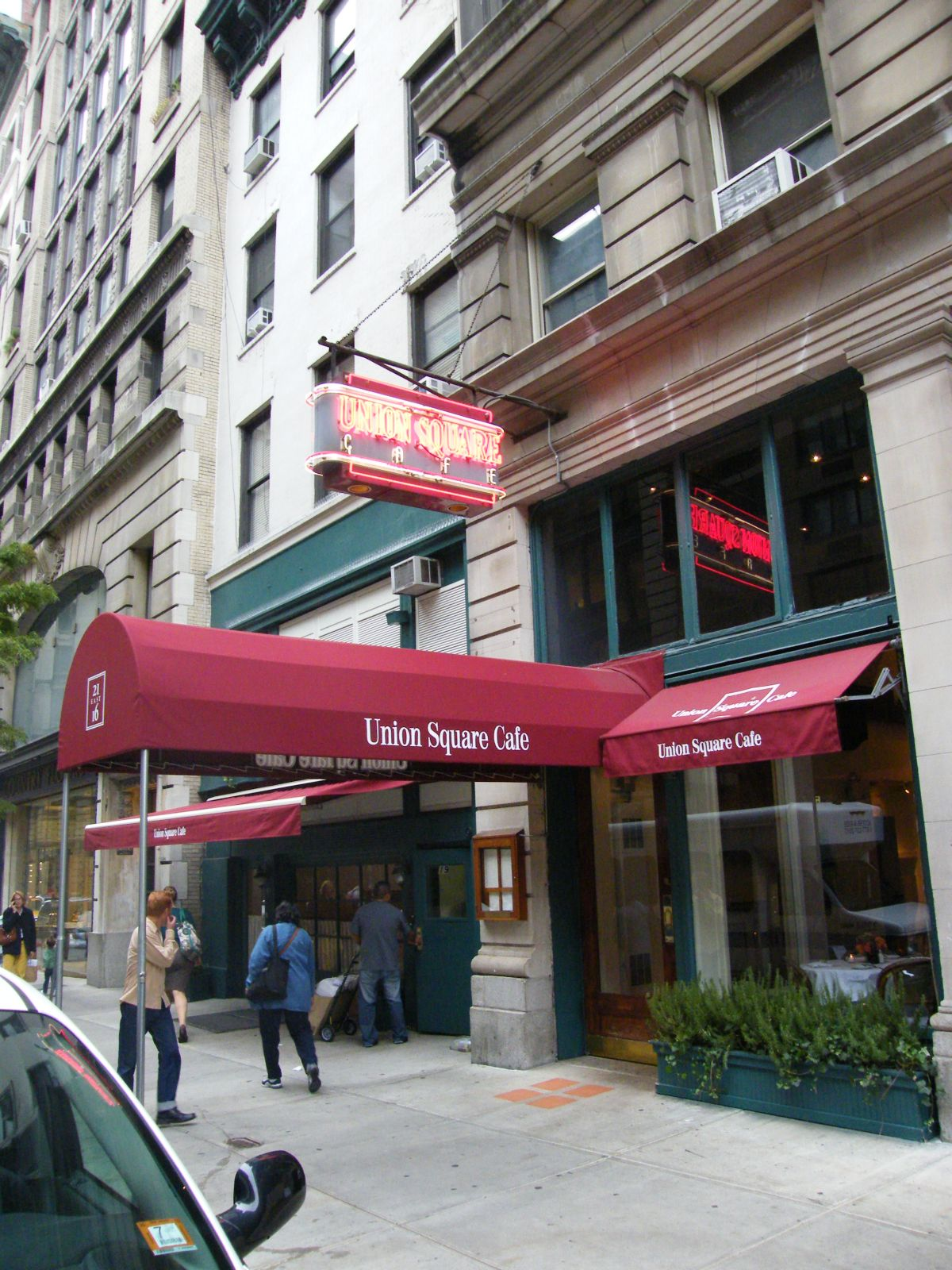
The exterior of Union Square Cafe

Several reviews noted the expectations that preceded the book's publication. The novel was mostly well received, with some critics noting that the central characters (particularly Jake) were not fully fleshed out and the novel lacks overall substance. However, others, such as Gabrielle Hamilton, writing for the New York Times praised the novel, saying the "faults of the book are few".

Vanity Fair referred to the novel as a "love letter" to Union Square Cafe. It was No. 32 on USA Today's bestseller's list.

The Washington Post's Karen Heller described the novel as "true to its title: a smart, delicious, coming-of-age tale about a young woman already drunk on the idea of New York before her true education begins."

== TV series ==
In October 2017, Starz and Plan B Entertainment announced the development of a TV adaptation of the novel, with Ella Purnell as Tess. The series premiered on Starz on May 6, 2018 to mixed reviews. In July 2018, it was announced that the series was renewed for a second season, which premiered in July 2019. It was cancelled in December 2019, after the second season ended.
