= Union Square Cafe =

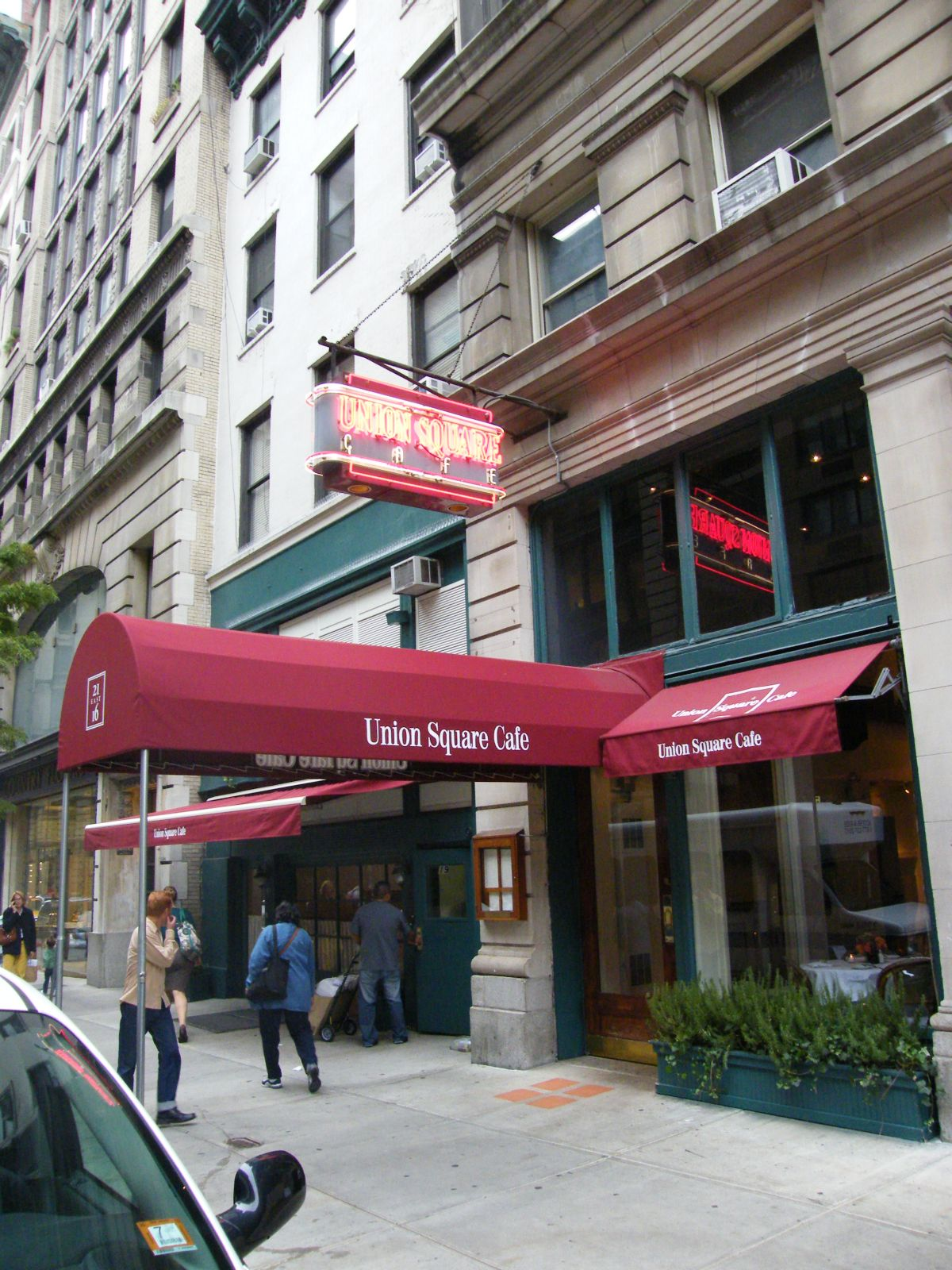
- Union Square Cafe, 21 E 16th Street, September 2008
- Interactive map of Union Square Cafe

Restaurant information
- Established: October 1985; 40 years ago
- Owner: Union Square Hospitality Group
- Chef: Lena Ciardullo
- Food type: New American
- Location: 101 E 19th St (between Park Avenue South and Irving Place), Manhattan, New York City, New York, 10003, United States
- Coordinates: 40.737752°N 73.987881°W
- Website: unionsquarecafe.com

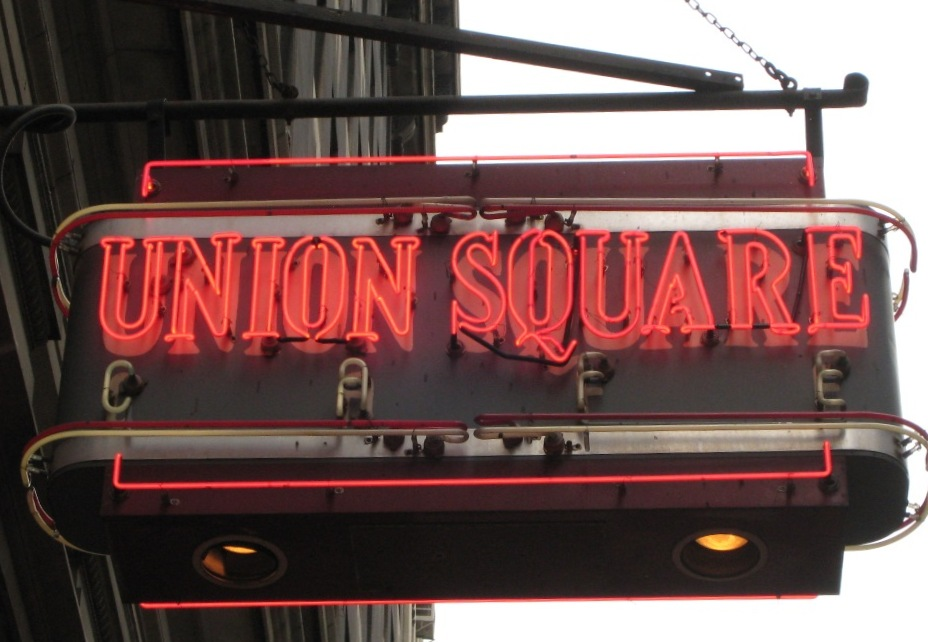
Entrance sign

Union Square Cafe is an American restaurant featuring New American cuisine with Italian influences, located at 101 E 19th St (between Park Avenue South and Irving Place), in the Union Square neighborhood of the Manhattan borough of New York City, New York. It is owned by the Union Square Hospitality Group.

== History ==
In October 1985, Danny Meyer opened Union Square Cafe with chef Ali Barker. In December 2015, The restaurant's lease at 21 E 16th Street ended. In December 2016, Union Square Cafe reopened at 101 East 19th Street.

== Design ==
The original restaurant was designed by architect Larry Bogdanow. The new location is designed by architect David Rockwell.

== Awards and accolades ==
The restaurant has won multiple awards and honors since its inception, including the ranking of "Favorite New York Restaurant" in the Zagat Survey in the 1997, 1998, 1999, 2000, 2001, 2002, 2004 and 2008 editions. Notably, the restaurant did not receive a Michelin star during Michelin's 2005 review of New York restaurants, leading to concerns that the guide might be biased towards French cuisine or restaurants that "emphasize formality and presentation".

- 1992, Outstanding Service, James Beard Foundation
- 1997, Outstanding Restaurant, James Beard Foundation
- 1997–2001, Zagat Survey #1 Favorite New York Restaurant
- 1998–1999, New York Times Three Star Award
- 1999, Outstanding Wine Service, James Beard Foundation
- 2000, Michael Romano inducted into "Who's Who of Food & Beverage", James Beard Foundation
- 2000–2002, Forbes magazine Three Star Review
- 2001, James Beard Foundation Best Chef New York City – Michael Romano
- 2003, Zagat Survey #2 Favorite New York Restaurant
- 2004, Wine Spectator Award of Excellence
- 2004, Zagat Survey #1 Favorite New York Restaurant
- 2005, Forbes magazine Three Star Review
- 2005–2007, Zagat Survey #2 Favorite New York Restaurant
- 2006-2010, Wine Spectator Best of Award of Excellence
- 2008, Zagat Survey #1 Favorite New York Restaurant
- 2012-2013, Wine Spectator Best of Award of Excellence

== In popular culture ==
The 2016 novel Sweetbitter features a protagonist who works as a waitress in a fictionalized version of the restaurant; Vanity Fair referred to the novel as a "love letter" to Union Square Cafe.

== See also ==
- Cuisine of New York City
- List of New American restaurants
