= 68th Writers Guild of America Awards =

68th WGA Awards
- Date: February 13, 2016
- Organized by: Writers Guild of America, East and the Writers Guild of America West

The 68th Writers Guild of America Awards honored the best in film, television, radio and video-game writing of 2015. Winners were announced on February 13, 2016, at Hyatt Regency Century Plaza, Los Angeles, California. The nominations for Television, New Media, Radio, News and Promotional Writing were announced on December 3, 2015, while, Theatrical and Documentary Screenplay were announced on January 6, 2016, and Video-game Writing was announced the following week. There were no nominees in the Television Graphic Art and Animation.

The show was hosted by Lisa Kudrow.

== Winners and nominees ==
Winners are listed first and in bold.

=== Film ===
Best Original Screenplay
- **Spotlight (Open Road Films) – Josh Singer & Tom McCarthy** † (Note: † indicates the winners of the Academy Awards for Best Original Screenplay and Best Adapted Screenplay.)
- Bridge of Spies (DreamWorks) – Matt Charman and Ethan Coen & Joel Coen
- Sicario (Lions Gate Entertainment) – Taylor Sheridan
- Straight Outta Compton (Universal Studios) – screenplay by Jonathan Herman and Andrea Berloff; story by S. Leigh Savidge, Alan Wenkus and Andrea Berloff
- Trainwreck (Universal Studios) – Amy Schumer
Best Adapted Screenplay
- **The Big Short (Paramount Pictures) – Charles Randolph and Adam McKay; based on the book by Michael Lewis** †
- Carol (The Weinstein Company) – Phyllis Nagy; based on the novel The Price of Salt by Patricia Highsmith
- The Martian (20th Century Fox) – Drew Goddard; based on the novel by Andy Weir
- Steve Jobs (Universal Studios) – Aaron Sorkin; based on the book by Walter Isaacson
- Trumbo (Bleecker Street) – John McNamara; based on the biography Dalton Trumbo by Bruce Alexander Cook
Best Documentary Screenplay
- **Going Clear: Scientology and the Prison of Belief (HBO Documentary Films) – Alex Gibney**
- Being Canadian (Candy Factory Films) – Robert Cohen
- Kurt Cobain: Montage of Heck (HBO Documentary Films) – Brett Morgen
- Prophet's Prey (Showtime Documentary Films) – Amy J. Berg

=== Television ===
Drama Series
- **Mad Men (AMC) – Lisa Albert, Semi Chellas, Jonathan Igla, Janet Leahy, Erin Levy, Tom Smuts, Robert Towne, Matthew Weiner, Carly Wray**
- The Americans (FX) – Peter Ackerman, Joshua Brand, Joel Fields, Stephen Schiff, Lara Shapiro, Joe Weisberg, Tracey Scott Wilson, Stuart Zicherman
- Better Call Saul (AMC) – Vince Gilligan, Peter Gould, Gennifer Hutchison, Bradley Paul, Thomas Schnauz, Gordon Smith
- Game of Thrones (HBO) – David Benioff, Bryan Cogman, Dave Hill, D. B. Weiss
- Mr. Robot (USA) – Kyle Bradstreet, Kate Erickson, Sam Esmail, David Iserson, Randolph Leon, Adam Penn, Matt Pyken
Comedy Series
- **Veep (HBO) – Simon Blackwell, Jon Brown, Kevin Cecil, Roger Drew, Peter Fellows, Neil Gibbons, Rob Gibbons, Sean Gray, Callie Hersheway, Armando Iannucci, Sean Love, Ian Martin, Georgia Pritchett, David Quantick, Andy Riley, Tony Roche, Will Smith**
- Broad City (Comedy Central) – Lucia Aniello, Paul W. Downs, Naomi Ekperigin, Ilana Glazer, Abbi Jacobson, Chris Kelly, Anthony King, Jen Statsky
- Silicon Valley (HBO) – Amy Aniobi, Alec Berg, Mike Judge, Carrie Kemper, Sonny Lee, Dan Lyons, Carson Mell, Dan O'Keefe, Clay Tarver, Ron Weiner
- Transparent (Amazon Studios) – Arabella Anderson, Bridget Bedard, Micah Fitzerman-Blue, Noah Harpster, Ethan Kuperberg, Ali Liebegott, Our Lady J, Faith Soloway, Jill Soloway
- Unbreakable Kimmy Schmidt (Netflix) – Emily Altman, Jack Burditt, Robert Carlock, Azie Mira Dungey, Tina Fey, Lauren Gurganous, Charla Lauriston, Sam Means, Dan Rubin, Meredith Scardino, Allison Silverman, Lon Zimmet
New Series
- **Mr. Robot (USA) – Kyle Bradstreet, Kate Erickson, Sam Esmail, David Iserson, Randolph Leon, Adam Penn, Matt Pyken**
- Better Call Saul (AMC) – Vince Gilligan, Peter Gould, Gennifer Hutchison, Bradley Paul, Thomas Schnauz, Gordon Smith
- Bloodline (Netflix) – Jonathan Glatzer, Carter Harris, Glenn Kessler, Todd A. Kessler, Addison McQuigg, Arthur Phillips, Jeff Shakoor, Daniel Zelman
- The Last Man On Earth (Fox) – Andy Bobrow, Liz Cackowski, Erik Durbin, Will Forte, Kira Kalush, Matt Marshall, Tim McAuliffe, David Noel, Erica Rivinoja, John Solomon, Emily Spivey
- Unbreakable Kimmy Schmidt (Netflix) – Emily Altman, Jack Burditt, Robert Carlock, Azie Mira Dungey, Tina Fey, Lauren Gurganous, Charla Lauriston, Sam Means, Dan Rubin, Meredith Scardino, Allison Silverman, Lon Zimmet
Long Form – Original
- **Saints & Strangers (NAT Geo) – Seth Fisher, Walon Green, Chip Johannessen, Eric Overmyer**
- American Horror Story: Hotel (FX) – Brad Falchuk, John J. Gray, Todd Kubrak, Crystal Liu, Ned Martel, Tim Minear, Ryan Murphy, Jennifer Salt, James Wong
- Flesh and Bone (Starz) – Bronwyn Garrity, Jami O'Brien, Adam Rapp, Moira Walley-Beckett, David Wiener
- Sons of Liberty (History) – Stephen David, Kirk Ellis, David C. White
Long Form – Adapted
- **Fargo (FX) – Steve Blackman, Bob DeLaurentis, Noah Hawley, Ben Nedivi, Matt Wolpert, Based on the film Fargo**
- The Red Tent (Lifetime) – Elizabeth Chandler, Anne Meredith, Based on the book The Red Tent by Anita Diamant
- Show Me a Hero (HBO) – David Simon, William F. Zorzi, Based on the book by Lisa Belkin
Short Form New Media – Original
- **"Back to Reality" – Weight (weighttheseries.com) – Daryn Strauss**
- "Born This Way" – Anyone But Me (Hulu) – Susan Miller
Short Form New Media – Adapted
- **"Chapter Two: Phoebe" – Heroes Reborn: Dark Matters (nbc.com) – Zach Craley**
- "Part 8" – Fear The Walking Dead: Flight 462 (amc.com) – L. Signorino & Mike Zunic
- "The Summer of Love, Part 1: Meet Charlie" – Aquarius (nbc.com) – Mike Moore & David Reed
Animation
- **"Housetrap" – Bob's Burgers (Fox) – Dan Fybel**
- "Halloween of Horror" – The Simpsons (Fox) – Carolyn Omine
- "Gayle Makin' Bob Sled" – Bob's Burgers (Fox) – Lizzie Molyneux & Wendy Molyneux
- "Hank After Dark" – BoJack Horseman (Netflix) – Kelly Galuska
- "Sky Police" – The Simpsons (Fox) – Matt Selman
- "Walking Big & Tall" – The Simpsons (Fox) – Michael Price
Episodic Drama
- **"Uno" – Better Call Saul (AMC) – Vince Gilligan & Peter Gould**
- "Mother's Mercy" – Game of Thrones (HBO) – David Benioff & D. B. Weiss
- "Mind's Eye" – The Good Wife (CBS) – Robert King & Michelle King
- "International Assassin" – The Leftovers (HBO) – Damon Lindelof & Nick Cuse
- "Person to Person" – Mad Men (AMC) – Matthew Weiner
- "Explosivos" – Narcos (Netflix) – Andy Black
Episodic Comedy
- **"Sand Hill Shuffle" – Silicon Valley (HBO) – Clay Tarver**
- "Rock, Paper, Scissors, Gun" – black-ish (ABC) – Peter Saji
- "Alive in Tucson" – The Last Man On Earth (FOX) – Will Forte
- "Racegate" – Maron (IFC) – Dave Anthony
- "Connection Lost" – Modern Family (ABC) – Megan Ganz & Steven Levitan
- "Joint Session" – Veep (HBO) – Simon Blackwell & Georgia Pritchett, Story by Armando Iannucci & Simon Blackwell & Georgia Pritchett
Comedy/Variety – Talk Series
- **Real Time with Bill Maher (HBO) – Scott Carter, Adam Felber, Matt Gunn, Brian Jacobsmeyer, Jay Jaroch, Chris Kelly, Bill Maher, Billy Martin and Danny Vermont**
- The Daily Show with Jon Stewart (Comedy Central) – Dan Amira, Steve Bodow, Travon Free, Hallie Haglund, Elliott Kalan, Matt Koff, Adam Lowitt, Dan McCoy, Jo Miller, Zhubin Parang, Owen Parsons, Daniel Radosh, Lauren Sarver, Jon Stewart and Delaney Yeager
- Conan (TBS) – Jose Arroyo, Josh Comers, Dan Cronin, Andres du Bouchet, Jessie Gaskell, Michael Gordon, Brian Kiley, Laurie Kilmartin, Rob Kutner, Todd Levin, Levi MacDougall, Conan O'Brien, Matt O'Brien, Andy Richter, Frank Smiley, Brian Stack, Mike Sweeney
- The Late Show with Stephen Colbert (CBS) –Michael Brumm, Nate Charny, Aaron Cohen, Stephen Colbert, Cullen Crawford, Paul Dinello, Eric Drysdale, Rob Dubbin, Ariel Dumas, Glenn Eichler, Gabriel Gronli, Barry Julien, Jay Katsir, Daniel Kibblesmith, Matt Lappin, Opus Moreschi, Tom Purcell, Jen Spyra, Brian Stack
- The Tonight Show Starring Jimmy Fallon (NBC) – Jonathan Adler, Patrick Borelli, Gerard Bradford, Luke Cunningham, Mike DiCenzo, Mike Drucker, Jess Dweck, Dicky Eagan, Caroline Eppright, Jimmy Fallon, John Haskell, JR Havlan, Josh Lieb, Arthur Meyer, A.D. Miles, Chase Mitchell, Dan Opsal, Gavin Purcell, Jon Rineman, Albertina Rizzo, David Young
Comedy/Variety – Sketch Series
- **Inside Amy Schumer (Comedy Central) – Jessi Klein Writers: Hallie Cantor, Kim Caramele, Kyle Dunnigan, Jon Glaser, Kurt Metzger, Christine Nangle, Dan Powell, Tami Sagher and Amy Schumer**
- Key & Peele (Comedy Central) – Colton Dunn, Rebecca Drysdale, Keegan-Michael Key, Phil Augusta Jackson, Jay Martel, Jordan Peele, Ian Roberts, Alex Rubens, Charlie Sanders and Rich Talarico
- Saturday Night Live (NBC) – Colin Jost, Rob Klein, James Anderson, Jeremy Beiler, Megan Callahan, Michael Che, Mikey Day, Steve Higgins, Zach Kanin, Chris Kelly, Erik Kenward, Dave McCary, Dennis McNicholas, Lorne Michaels, Claire Mulaney, Mike O'Brien, Josh Patten, Alison Rich, Katie Rich, Tim Robinson, Natasha Rothwell, Nick Rutherford, Meredith Scardino, Sarah Schneider, Pete Schultz, Streeter Seidell, John Solomon and Kent Sublette
Comedy/Variety (Music, Awards, Tributes) – Specials
- **Jimmy Kimmel Live!: 10th Annual After The Oscars Special (ABC) – Jack Allison, Tony Barbieri, Jonathan Bines, Joelle Boucai, Greg Dorris, Gary Greenberg, Josh Halloway, Sal Iacono, Eric Immerman, Jimmy Kimmel, Bess Kalb, Jeff Loveness, Molly McNearney, Danny Ricker, Joe Strazzullo, Bridger Winegar;**
- Amy Schumer: Live at the Apollo (HBO) – Amy Schumer
- 69th Tony Awards (CBS) – Dave Boone; Special Material by Adam Goldman and Carol Leifer
- 2014 Kennedy Center Honors (CBS) – Lewis Friedman, Sara Lukinson, Nell Scovell, George Stevens Jr., Michael Stevens
- 2015 Film Independent Spirit Awards (IFC) – Benji Aflalo, Wayne Federman, Marika Sawyer, Frank Sebastiano, Erik Weiner
- Saturday Night Live 40th Anniversary Special (NBC) – James Anderson, Fred Armisen, Tina Fey, Steve Higgins, Chris Kelly, Erik Kenward, Rob Klein, Seth Meyers, Lorne Michaels, John Mulaney, Paula Pell, Andy Samberg, Akiva Schaffer, Tom Schiller, Sarah Schneider, Marc Shaiman, Michael Shoemaker, Robert Smigel, Emily Spivey, Kent Sublette, Jorma Taccone, Bryan Tucker
Quiz and Audience Participation
- **Hollywood Game Night (NBC) – Head Writer: Grant Taylor; Writers: Michael Agbabian, Alex Chauvin, Ann Slichter and Dwight D. Smith**
- Jeopardy! (ABC) – John Duarte, Harry Friedman, Mark Gaberman, Deborah Griffin, Michele Loud, Robert McClenaghan, Jim Rhine, Steve D. Tamerius and Billy Wisse
Daytime Drama
- **General Hospital (ABC) – Ron Carlivati, Anna Theresa Cascio, Andrea Archer Compton, Suzanne Flynn, Kate Hall, Elizabeth Korte, Daniel James O'Connor, Elizabeth Page, Jean Passanante, Katherine Schock, Scott Sickles and Chris Van Etten**
- The Bold and the Beautiful (CBS) – Bradley P. Bell, Michael Minnis Writers: Rex M. Best, Shannon Bradley, Adam Dusevoir, Tracey Ann Kelly, Patrick Mulcahey, Mark Pinciotti and Michele Val Jean
Children's Script – Episodic and Specials
- **"Gortimer, Ranger and Mel vs. The Endless Night" – Gortimer Gibbon's Life on Normal Street (Amazon Studios) – Enders & Aminta Goyel**
- "Girl Meets I am Farkle" – Girl Meets World (Disney Channel) – Mark Blutma
- "Gortimer and the Surprise Signature" – Gortimer Gibbon's Life on Normal Street (Amazon Studios) – Garrett Frawley & Brian Turner
- "Ranger vs. The Fabled Flower of Normal Street" – Gortimer Gibbon's Life on Normal Street (Amazon Studios) – Laurie Parres
- "Gortimer vs The Relentless Rainbow of Joy" – Gortimer Gibbon's Life on Normal Street (Amazon Studios) – David Anaxagoras and Luke Matheny
Children's Long Form
- Descendants (Disney Channel) – Josann McGibbon & Sara Parriott

==== Documentary ====
Documentary Script – Current Events
- **"American Terrorist" – Frontline (PBS) – Thomas Jennings**
- "Gunned Down: The Power of the NRA" – Frontline (PBS) – Michael Kirk & Mike Wiser
Documentary Script – Other than Current Events
- **"The Great Math Mystery" – Nova (PBS) – Daniel McCab**
- "Firestone and the Warlord" – Frontline (PBS) – Marcela Gaviria
- "The Forgotten Plague" – American Experience (PBS) – Chana Gazit
- "Secrets, Politics and Torture" – Frontline (PBS) – Michael Kirk & Mike Wiser

==== News ====
TV News Script – Regularly Scheduled, Bulletin, or Breaking Report
- **"Cuba" 60 Minutes (CBS News) – Scott Pelley, Nicole Young, Oriana Zill de Granados, Andy Court and Robert Anderson**
- "Yogi Berra Tribute" (CBS Newspath) – Gerald Mazza
TV News Script – Analysis, Feature, or Commentary
- **"The Storm After the Storm" 60 Minutes (CBS News) – Sharyn Alfonsi, Michael Rey and Oriana Zill de Granados**

=== Radio ===
Radio Documentary
- **"Marking the End of Vietnam: 40 Years Later" (ABC News Radio) – Andrew Evans**
Radio News Script – Regularly Scheduled, Bulletin, or Breaking Report
- **"Remembering New York Icons" (CBS Radio News) – Thomas A. Sabella**
- "Showtop" (ABC News Radio) – Chris Barry
- "World News This Week, January 9, 2015" (ABC News Radio) – Andrew Evans
Radio News Script – Analysis, Feature, or Commentary
- **"Passages" (CBS Radio News) – Gail Lee**
- "Death of a Baseball Icon" (ABC News Radio) – Andrew Evans

=== Promotional Writing ===
On-Air Promotion – Television, New Media, or Radio
- **The McCarthys and Under the Dome (Promos) – Erial Tompkins (CBS)**
- CBS On-Air (Promos) – Jessica Katzenstein (CBS)
- Elementary (Promos) – Molly J. Neylan (CBS)

=== Videogaming Writing ===
Outstanding Achievement in Videogame Writing
- **Rise of the Tomb Raider (Square Enix) – John Stafford, Cameron Suey, Rhianna Pratchett, Philip Gelatt**
- Assassin's Creed Syndicate (Ubisoft) – Marc-Alexis Cote, Hugo Giard, Corey May, Jeffrey Yohalem, Corey May, Jeffrey Yohalem, Melissa MacCoubrey, Richard Farrese, Russell Lees, Mark Llabres Hill, James Nadiger, Jared Schincariol, Travis Stout, Ceri Young, Judith Flanders, C.J. Kershner, Gabrielle Shrager, Danny Wallace and Paul Monk
- Pillars of Eternity (Obsidian Entertainment) – Eric Fenstermaker, Carrie Patel, Olivia Veras, Chris Avellone, Jeff Husges, Matt MacLean, Jorge Salgado, Josh Sawyer and George Ziets
- The Witcher 3: Wild Hunt (CD Projekt Red) – Marcin Blacha, Borys Pugacz-Muraszkiewicz, Arkadiusz Borowik, Aleksandra Motyka, Bartosz Ochman, Karolina Stachyra, Jakub Szamalek, Marcin Batylda, Michal Galek, Tomasz Marchewka, Robert Oglodzinski, Rafal Praszalek, Artur Sliwinski, Stanislaw Swiecicki, Pawel Zych, Marcin Blacha and Jakub Szamalek
