= 47th NAACP Image Awards =

American entertainment awards for 2015 works

47th Image Awards
- Date: February 5, 2016
- Location: Pasadena Civic Auditorium
- Hosted by: Anthony Anderson

Highlights
- Most awards: Jussie Smollett
- Most nominations: Janet Jackson/Jussie Smollett

Television/radio coverage
- Network: TV One

The 47th Image Awards, was presented by the NAACP, commemorating roles, talents, and achievements of people of color in film, television, music and literature during the 2015 calendar year. This ceremony was hosted for the third time by Anthony Anderson on the TV One network.

American singer, songwriter and record producer John Legend received the President's Award for his humanitarian efforts, promoting the voting rights in the United States, education reform for all races and ethnicities and to be "widely read with respect to public policy reform, social justice reform and criminal justice reform". American actor and singer Jussie Smollett, Brittany "Bree" Newsome, Rev. Dr. Otis Moss III, Rev. Dr. Howard-John Wesle, Rev. Dr. Jamal Harrison Bryant and the institution The University of Mississippi NAACP College Chapter and Justice League NYC, were honored with the Chairman's Award.

All nominees are listed below, and the winners are listed in bold.

== Special awards ==
President's Award
- **John Legend**
Chairman's Award
- **Brittany "Bree" Newsome**
- **Justice League NYC**
- **The University of Mississippi NAACP College Chapter**
- **Rev. Dr. Otis Moss III**
- **Rev. Dr. Howard-John Wesley**
- **Rev. Dr. Jamal Harrison Bryant**
- **Jussie Smollett**
Entertainer of the Year
- **Michael B. Jordan**
- Misty Copeland
- Pharrell Williams
- Shonda Rhimes
- Viola Davis

== Motion Picture ==
Awards adapted by Variety.

Outstanding Motion Picture

- **Straight Outta Compton**
- Beasts of No Nation
- Concussion
- Creed
- Dope

Outstanding Actor in a Motion Picture

- **Michael B. Jordan** - Creed
- Abraham Attah - Beasts of No Nation
- Chiwetel Ejiofor - Secret in Their Eyes
- Michael Ealy - The Perfect Guy
- Will Smith - Concussion

Outstanding Actress in a Motion Picture

- **Sanaa Lathan** - The Perfect Guy
- Keke Palmer - Brotherly Love
- Teyonah Parris - Chi-Raq
- Viola Davis - Lila and Eve
- Zoe Saldaña - Infinitely Polar Bear

Outstanding Supporting Actor in a Motion Picture

- **O'Shea Jackson Jr.** - Straight Outta Compton
- Chiwetel Ejiofor - The Martian
- Corey Hawkins - Straight Outta Compton
- Forest Whitaker - Southpaw
- Idris Elba - Beasts of No Nation

Outstanding Supporting Actress in a Motion Picture

- **Phylicia Rashad** - Creed
- Angela Bassett - Chi-Raq
- Gugu Mbatha-Raw - Concussion
- Jennifer Hudson - Chi-Raq
- Tessa Thompson - Creed

Outstanding Writing in a Motion Picture

- **Ryan Coogler and Aaron Covington - Creed**
- Andrea Berloff and Jonathan Herman and Alan Wenkus - Straight Outta Compton
- Christopher Cleveland, Bettina Gilois, and Grant Thompson - McFarland USA
- Rick Famuyiwa - Dope

Outstanding Writing in a Motion Picture, Television

- **Lawrence Hill and Clement Virgo - The Book of Negroes**
- Dee Rees, and Christopher Cleveland, Bettina Gilois - Bessie
- Michael S. Bandy and Eric Stein - White Water
- Nzingha Stewart - With This Ring
- Shem Bitterman - Whitney

Outstanding Directing in a Motion Picture

- **Ryan Coogler - Creed**
- Rick Famuyiwa - Dope
- Alfonso Gomez-Rejon - Me and Earl and the Dying Girl
- Charles Stone III - Lila and Eve
- F. Gary Gray - Straight Outta Compton

Outstanding Directing in a Motion Picture, Television

- **Dee Rees - Bessie**
- Christine Swanson - For the Love of Ruth
- Nzingha Stewart - With This Ring
- Rusty Cundieff - White Water
- Salim Akil - The Start Up

Outstanding Independent Motion Picture

- **Beasts of No Nation**
- Brotherly Love
- Chi-Raq
- Infinitely Polar Bear
- Secret in Their Eyes

== Television ==
Outstanding Comedy Series

- **black-ish**
- House of Lies
- Key & Peele
- Orange is the New Black
- Survivor's Remorse

Outstanding Actor in a Comedy Series

- **Anthony Anderson** - black-ish
- Andre Braugher - Brooklyn Nine-Nine
- Don Cheadle - House of Lies
- Dwayne Johnson - Ballers
- RonReaco Lee - Survivor's Remorse

Outstanding Actress in a Comedy Series

- **Tracee Ellis Ross** - black-ish
- Gina Rodriguez - Jane The Virgin
- Loretta Devine - The Carmichael Show
- Uzo Aduba - Orange is the New Black
- Wendy Raquel Robinson - The Game

Outstanding Supporting Actor in a Comedy Series

- **Mike Epps** - Survivor's Remorse
- David Alan Grier - The Carmichael Show
- Laurence Fishburne - black-ish
- Miles Brown - black-ish
- Terry Crews - Brooklyn Nine-Nine

Outstanding Supporting Actress in a Comedy Series

- **Marsai Martin** - black-ish
- Anna Deavere Smith - Nurse Jackie
- Danielle Brooks - Orange is the New Black
- Laverne Cox - Orange is the New Black
- Tichina Arnold - Survivor's Remorse

Outstanding Writing in a Comedy Series

- **Kenya Barris: The Word** - black-ish
- Alan Yang and Aziz Ansari : Master of None - Parents
- Jennie Snyder Urman: Chapter Twenty-Three - Jane The Virgin
- Joey Soloway: Kina Hora - Transparent
- Jordan Peele, Keegan-Michael Key, Jay Martel, Ian Roberts, Rebecca Drysdale, Colton Dunn, Phil Augusta Jackson, Alex Rubens, Charlie Sanders, and Rich Talarico: Y'all Ready For This? - Key & Peele

Outstanding Directing in a Comedy Series

- **Don Cheadle - The Urge to Save Humanity is Almost Always a False Front for the Urge to Rule** - House of Lies
- Aziz Ansari: Master of None - Parents
- Brad Silberling: Chapter Twenty-Three - Jane The Virgin
- Peter Atencio: The End - Key & Peele
- Stan Lathan: Cabin Pressure - Real Husbands of Hollywood

Outstanding Drama Series

- **Empire**
- Being Mary Jane
- How to Get Away with Murder
- Power
- Scandal

Outstanding Actor in a Drama Series

- **Terrence Howard** - Empire
- LL Cool J - NCIS: Los Angeles
- Morris Chestnut - Rosewood
- Omari Hardwick - Power
- Wesley Snipes - The Player

Outstanding Actress in a Drama Series

- **Taraji P. Henson** - Empire
- Gabrielle Union - Being Mary Jane
- Kerry Washington - Scandal
- Nicole Beharie - Sleepy Hollow
- Viola Davis - How to Get Away With Murder

Outstanding Supporting Actor in a Drama Series

- **Joe Morton** - Scandal
- Alfred Enoch - How to Get Away with Murder
- Bryshere Y. Gray - Empire
- Guillermo Díaz - Scandal
- Jussie Smollett - Empire

Outstanding Supporting Actress in a Drama Series

- **Regina King** - American Crime
- Cicely Tyson - How to Get Away with Murder
- Danai Gurira - The Walking Dead
- Grace Gealey - Empire
- Naturi Naughton - Power

Outstanding Writing in a Dramatic Series

- **Mara Brock Akil, Jameal Turner, and Keli Goff** : Sparrow - Being Mary Jane
- Erika Green Swafford and Doug Stockstill: Mama's Here Now - How to Get Away with Murder
- John Ridley: Episode 1 - American Crime
- LaToya Morgan: False Flag - Turn: Washingtons Spies
- Lee Daniels and Danny Strong: Pilot - Empire

Outstanding Directing in a Dramatic Series

- **John Ridley: Episode 1 - American Crime**
- Ernest Dickerson: Welcome the Stranger - Hand of God
- Lee Daniels : Pilot - Empire
- Millicent Shelton: Episode Ten - American Crime
- Salim Akil: Sparrow - Being Mary Jane

Outstanding Television Movie, Mini-Series or Dramatic Special

- **The Wiz Live!**
- American Crime
- Bessie
- Luther
- The Book of Negroes

Outstanding Actor in a Television Movie, Mini-Series or Dramatic Special

- **David Alan Grier** - The Wiz Live!
- Cuba Gooding Jr. - The Book of Negroes
- David Oyelowo - Nightingale
- Idris Elba - Luther
- Michael Kenneth Williams - Bessie

Outstanding Actress in a Television Movie, Mini-Series or Dramatic Special

- **Queen Latifah** - Bessie
- Angela Bassett - American Horror Story: Hotel
- Aunjanue Ellis - The Book of Negroes
- Jill Scott - With this Ring
- LaTanya Richardson Jackson - Show Me a Hero

Outstanding News Information – Series or Special

- **Unsung**
- Katrina: 10 Years After the Storm
- News One Now
- Oprah Prime: Celebrating Dr. King and the Selma Marches 50 Years Later
- Oprah: Where Are They Now?

Outstanding Talk Series

- **The Talk**
- Melissa Harris-Perry
- Steve Harvey
- The Daily Show with Trevor Noah
- The Wendy Williams Show

Outstanding Reality Program/Reality Competition Series

- **Welcome to Sweetie Pie's**
- Dancing with the Stars
- Iyanla: Fix My Life
- Shark Tank
- The Voice

Outstanding Variety, Series or Special

- **Family Feud**
- Black Girls Rock!
- Oprah's Master Class
- The Daily Show with Trevor Noah
- The Nightly Show with Larry Wilmore

Outstanding Children's Program

- **Doc McStuffins**
- Dora and Friends
- K.C. Undercover
- Little Ballers
- Project Mc^{2}

Outstanding Performance by a Youth - Series, Special, Television Movie or Mini-series

- **Marcus Scribner** - black-ish
- Hudson Yang - Fresh Off The Boat
- Marsai Martin - black-ish
- Miles Brown - black-ish
- Skai Jackson - Jessie

Outstanding Host in a News, Talk, Reality, or Variety (Series or Special)

- **Steve Harvey** - Family Feud
- Melissa Harris-Perry - Melissa Harris-Perry
- Bryant Gumbel - Real Sports with Bryant Gumbel
- Trevor Noah - The Daily Show with Trevor Noah
- Larry Wilmore - The Nightly Show with Larry Wilmore

== Documentary ==
Outstanding Documentary

- **The Black Panthers: Vanguard of the Revolution**
- Amy
- Dreamcatcher
- In My Father's House
- What Happened, Miss Simone?

Outstanding Documentary, Television

- **Muhammad Ali: The Peoples Champ**
- August Wilson: The Ground on Which I Stand
- Belief
- Kareem: Minority of One
- Light Girls

== Animated ==
Outstanding Character Voice-Over Performance – Television or Film

- **Loretta Devine - Doc McStuffins**
- Aisha Tyler - Archer
- Audra McDonald - Doc McStuffins
- Jeffrey Wright - The Good Dinosaur
- Wanda Sykes - Penn Zero

== Music ==
Outstanding New Artist

- **Jussie Smollett**
- Andra Day
- Judith Hill
- The Weeknd
- Yazz

Outstanding Male Artist

- **Pharrell Williams**
- Charlie Wilson
- Kendrick Lamar
- The Weeknd
- Tyrese Gibson

Outstanding Female Artist

- **Jill Scott**
- Janet Jackson
- Jazmine Sullivan
- Lalah Hathaway
- Lauryn Hill

Outstanding Duo, Group or Collaboration

- **Empire Cast featuring Estelle & Jussie Smollett** - Conqueror
- Original Broadway Cast - Hamilton: An American Musical
- Janet Jackson featuring J. Cole - No Sleeep
- Big Sean featuring Kanye West and John Legend - One Man Can Change The World
- Alabama Shakes - Sound & Color

Outstanding Jazz Album

- **Miles Davis - Miles Davis at Newport 1955-1975: The Bootleg Series Vol. 4**
- Terell Stafford Quintet - BrotherLEE Love: Celebrating Lee Morgan
- Dee Dee Bridgewater, Irvin Mayfield, and New Orleans Jazz Orchestra - Dee Dee's Feathers
- Erroll Garner - The Complete Concert By The Sea
- Kamasi Washington - The Epic

Outstanding Gospel Album – Traditional or Contemporary

- **Tina Campbell - It's Personal**
- Kim Burrell - A Different Place
- Kirk Franklin - Losing My Religion
- Kirk Whalum - The Gospel According To Jazz – Chapter IV
- Marvin Sapp - You Shall Live

Outstanding Music Video

- **Tyrese Gibson - Shame**
- The Weeknd - Can't Feel My Face
- Pharrell Williams - Freedom
- Janet Jackson featuring J. Cole - No Sleeep
- Alabama Shakes - Sound & Color

Outstanding Song, Contemporary

- **Empire Cast featuring Jussie Smollett and Yazz - You're So Beautiful**
- Empire Cast feat. Estelle & Jussie Smollett - Conqueror
- Pharrell Williams - Freedom
- Janet Jackson feat. J. Cole - No Sleeep
- Janet Jackson - Unbreakable

Outstanding Song, Traditional

- **Jill Scott - Back Together**
- Seal - Every Time I'm with You
- Lauryn Hill - Feeling Good
- Charlie Wilson - Goodnight Kisses
- Jazmine Sullivan - Let It Burn

Outstanding Album

- **Jill Scott - Woman**
- The Weeknd - Beauty Behind the Madness
- Empire Cast - Empire: Original Soundtrack from Season 1
- Charlie Wilson - Forever Charlie
- Janet Jackson - Unbreakable

== Literature ==
Outstanding Literary Work – Fiction

- **Victoria Christopher Murrary- Stand Your Ground**
- Ravi Howard - Driving the King
- Tananarive Due - Ghost Summer: Stories
- ReShonda Tate Billingsley - Mama's Boy
- Chinelo Okparanta - Under the Udala Trees

Outstanding Literary Work – Non-Fiction

- **Spectacle: The Astonishing Life of Ota Benga** - Pamela Newkirk
- 50 Billion Dollar Boss: African American Women Sharing Stories of Success in Entrepreneurship and Leadership - Kathey Porter and Andrea Hoffman
- Ghettoside: A True Story of Murder in America - Jill Leovy
- SHOWDOWN: Thurgood Marshall and the Supreme Court Nomination That Changed America - Wil Haygood
- The Light of the World - Elizabeth Alexander

Outstanding Literary Work – Debut Author

- **The Fishermen - Chigozie Obioma**
- Between the World and Me - Ta-Nehisi Coates
- The Star Side of Bird Hill - Naomi Jackson
- The Turner House - Angela Flournoy
- The Wind In The Reeds: A Storm, A Play And The City That Could Not Be Broken - Wendell Pierce and Rod Dreher

Outstanding Literary Work – Biography/ Auto-Biography

- **Between The World and Me - Ta-Nehisi Coates**
- After the Dance: My Life with Marvin Gaye - Jan Gaye
- One Righteous Man: Samuel Battle and the Shattering of the Color Line in New York - Arthur Browne
- Power Forward: My Presidential Education - Reggie Love
- Year of Yes: How to Dance It Out, Stand In the Sun and Be Your Own Person - Shonda Rhimes

Outstanding Literary Work – Instructional

- **Soul Food Love: Healthy Recipes Inspired by One Hundred Years of Cooking in a Black Family** - Alice Randall and Caroline Randall Williams
- Big Words to Little Me: Tips and Advice for the Younger Self - Sakina Ibrahim and Jessie Lee
- Free Your Mind: An African American Guide to Meditation and Freedom - Cortez R. Rainey
- Grandbaby Cakes: Modern Recipes, Vintage Charm, Soulful Memories - Jocelyn Delk Adams
- Keep Calm... It's Just Real Estate: Your No-Stress Guide To Buying A Home - Egypt Sherrod

Outstanding Literary Work – Poetry

- **How to Be Drawn** - Terrance Hayes
- Catalog of Unabashed Gratitude - Ross Gay
- Reconnaissance - Carl Phillips
- Redbone - Mahogany L. Browne
- Wild Hundreds - Nate Marshall

Outstanding Literary Work – Children

- **Gordon Parks How the Photographer Captured Black and White America** - Carole Boston Weatherford
- Chasing Freedom: The Life Journeys of Harriet Tubman and Susan B. Anthony, Inspired by Historical Facts - Nikki Grimes
- Granddaddy's Turn: A Journey to the Ballot Box - Michael S. Bandy and Eric Stein
- If You Plant a Seed - Kadir Nelson
- New Shoes - Susan Lynn Meyer

Outstanding Literary Work – Youth/Teens

- **X: A Novel** - Ilyasah Shabazz and Kekla Magoon
- Rhythm Ride: A Road Trip Through the Motown Sound - Andrea Davis Pinkney
- Stella By Starlight - Sharon Draper
- Untwine - Edwidge Danticat
- You Are Wonderfully Made: 12 Life-Changing Principles for Teen Girls to Embrace - Gwen Richardson and Sylvia Daye Richardson
