= Jonathan Herman =

American screenwriter (born 1973)

- Born: 1973 (age 51–52); Connecticut, U.S.
- Occupation: Screenwriter
- Years active: 2007–present

Jonathan Herman (born 1973) is an American screenwriter, best known for his work in Straight Outta Compton for which he received numerous award nominations, including Best Original Screenplay at the 88th Academy Awards. Herman is Jewish.

== Filmography ==
- 2015: Straight Outta Compton

== Awards and nominations ==
Award	Category	Recipients and nominees	Work	Result	Ref
Academy Awards	Best Original Screenplay	Shared with: Andrea Berloff; S. Leigh Savidge; Alan Wenkus	Straight Outta Compton	Nominated	
NAACP Image Award	Outstanding Writing in a Motion Picture - Theatrical	Shared with: Andrea Berloff; S. Leigh Savidge; Alan Wenkus	Straight Outta Compton	Nominated	
Satellite Awards	Best Original Screenplay	Shared with: Andrea Berloff; S. Leigh Savidge; Alan Wenkus	Straight Outta Compton	Nominated	
Writers Guild of America Awards	Best Original Screenplay	Shared with: Andrea Berloff; S. Leigh Savidge; Alan Wenkus	Straight Outta Compton	Nominated	
