= The Mother (2023 film) =

Film by Niki Caro

- Promotional release poster
- Directed by: Niki Caro
- Screenplay by: Misha Green; Andrea Berloff; Peter Craig
- Story by: Misha Green
- Produced by: Jennifer Lopez; Elaine Goldsmith-Thomas; Benny Medina; Roy Lee; Miri Yoon; Marc Evans; Misha Green
- Starring: Jennifer Lopez; Joseph Fiennes; Lucy Paez; Omari Hardwick; Paul Raci; Gael García Bernal
- Cinematography: Ben Seresin
- Edited by: David Coulson
- Music by: Germaine Franco
- Production companies: Nuyorican Productions; Vertigo Entertainment
- Distributed by: Netflix
- Release date: May 12, 2023
- Running time: 118 minutes
- Country: United States
- Languages: English; Spanish

The Mother is a 2023 American action thriller film directed by Niki Caro with a screenplay by Misha Green, Andrea Berloff and Peter Craig, from a story by Green. The film stars Jennifer Lopez, Joseph Fiennes, Lucy Paez, Omari Hardwick, Paul Raci, and Gael García Bernal. It is about a former US army operative (Lopez) who partners with an FBI agent to find her teenage daughter after robbers kidnap her.

The Mother was released by Netflix on May 12, 2023. By June 2023, The Mother was the sixth most watched Netflix movie of all time, with 234.07 million hours viewed, but has since fallen out of the top ten.

== Plot ==
An unnamed U.S. military operative, known as "the Mother," brokers an arms smuggling deal between ex-SAS Captain Adrian Lovell and arms dealer Hector Álvarez. Romantically involved with them both, she ends up becoming pregnant. After discovering that they are involved with child trafficking, the Mother approaches the FBI to be an informant.

While the Mother is being interrogated at a safe house by FBI Special Agent William Cruise, Lovell attacks the property; Cruise is shot and wounded, and the other FBI agents are killed. The Mother saves Cruise's life and crafts a time-delayed bomb. Lovell confronts her in the bathroom and stabs her in the womb before getting knocked out and burned by the explosion. After the ordeal, the Mother gives birth to a girl prematurely in the hospital.

SAIC Eleanor Williams informs the Mother that Lovell's body was missing and that her newborn daughter will be placed with a foster family for protection. Understanding that the child will never be safe with her, she waives parental rights. The Mother visits Cruise, giving him three conditions: the child will have a life as ordinary as possible, she'll get a photo every birthday, and to call her if she is in jeopardy. The Mother then moves to a remote cabin in Alaska with the help of her former army colleague, Jons.

Twelve years later, Cruise contacts her to meet in Ohio. He informs her that when the ATF busted some of Álvarez's men in Mexico, they found a photo of her daughter, Zoe, suggesting they're onto The Mother. While Cruise and the Mother are shadowing Zoe playing at a park, Álvarez's men kidnap Zoe. The Mother manages to gun down several of them before escaping the cops with Cruise. While he thinks Zoe's kidnapping is for ransom, she knows it was done to lure her out of hiding.

They head to Havana, Cuba in hopes of uncovering a clue to Zoe's whereabouts. They catch Tarantula, Álvarez's lieutenant, who reveals under interrogation that she is being held at Álvarez's house on "the Plantation". Infiltrating his heavily-guarded home, they rescue Zoe. The Mother then kills Álvarez.

While escorting Zoe back home, the Mother's gaze upon her makes Zoe realize that she is her biological mother. The Mother decides to part ways and let Cruise return her to her foster parents. Lovell manages to intercept them, but the Mother arrives. Lovell kills Cruise, and the Mother escapes with Zoe.

Realizing Zoe is not safe if she returns home, the Mother takes her to the cabin. Over time, she teaches the reluctant girl survival skills, self-defense and small arms. They start to bond but when the Mother learns Lovell and a group of mercenaries is coming for them, she decides to leave Zoe with Jons. Upset to know she's being abandoned again by her own mother, Zoe is comforted by Jons, who encourages her to see the Mother through her actions and not her words. After she finds a letter from the Mother, explaining everything she has ever done has been for her, Zoe decides to go back to the cabin and help her mother defend herself from the attackers.

Lovell and his men have a final confrontation with the two. The Mother manages to kill all of Lovell's men before finally facing him. After she is knocked out during a hand-to-hand fight with Lovell, he grabs Zoe and speeds away, but the Mother snipes and kills him. With her former criminal partners dead, the Mother returns Zoe to her adoptive family. No longer needing to remain in hiding, she continues to observe Zoe from a distance.

== Cast ==
- Jennifer Lopez as "The Mother"
- Lucy Paez as Zoe
- Omari Hardwick as William Cruise
- Joseph Fiennes as Adrian Lovell
- Gael García Bernal as Hector Alvarez
- Paul Raci as Jons
- Jesse Garcia as Tarantula
- Yvonne Senat Jones as Sonya
- Edie Falco as SAIC Eleanor Williams

== Production ==
In February 2021, it was announced Jennifer Lopez had joined the cast of the film, with Niki Caro directing, from a screenplay by Misha Green and Andrea Berloff, with Netflix set to distribute.

In September 2021, it was announced Joseph Fiennes, Omari Hardwick, Gael García Bernal, Paul Raci and Lucy Paez had joined the cast of the film. In October 2021, Jesse Garcia and Yvonne Senat Jones joined the cast of the film.

Principal photography began in Vancouver on October 4, 2021. On January 11, 2022, filming was suspended due to the Omicron variant of COVID-19 during the pandemic.

In March 2022, filming took place on the Spanish island of Gran Canaria, using the old town of Las Palmas as a city in Cuba. The Gabinete Literario, located there, was used as a casino. The south of the island was also chosen to film a party in a villa.

== Release ==
=== Streaming ===
The Mother was released by Netflix on May 12, 2023.

According to Samba TV, the film was watched by 2.8 million United States households over its debut weekend. By Samba's data, the film over-indexed by 33% among Black households and 25% among Hispanic households. Between its release and June 2023 the film totaled 249.9 million hours watched (equal to 127.07 million views), the most of any Netflix original during that span.

== Reception ==
=== Critical response ===
Review aggregator website Rotten Tomatoes reports that 43% of 114 critics' reviews were positive, with an average rating of 5.1/10. The critics' consensus reads, "The Mother is a welcome opportunity to see Jennifer Lopez in action hero mode — albeit one that's frustratingly content to coast on genre clichés." On Metacritic, which uses a weighted average, the film has a score of 45 out of 100, based on 26 critics, indicating "mixed or average reviews". The Guardian gave the film a score of one out of five, calling it an "abjectly formulaic and inert Netflix thriller". As of January 2024, The Mother is among the top ten most-watched movies in Netflix’s history.

=== Accolades ===
Award / Film Festival	Date of ceremony	Category	Recipient(s)	Result	Ref.
Golden Raspberry Awards	March 9, 2024	Worst Actress	Jennifer Lopez	Nominated	
