= S. Leigh Savidge =

American screenwriter

- Born: Seattle, Washington, United States
- Occupation(s): Screenwriter, film producer and director
- Years active: 1971-present

S. Leigh Savidge III is an American screenwriter, film producer, director, and founder of Xenon Pictures, a production and licensing company.

== Career ==
In 2001, Savidge wrote and produced Welcome to Death Row, a documentary about Death Row Records, which was later turned into a book of the same name. He is known for his works in the restored version of The Harder They Come (restored in 2006) and Straight Outta Compton (2015), for which he co-wrote the original draft of the screenplay and also served as one of its executive producers. His 2001 documentary Welcome to Death Row was shopped as a feature-length sequel to Straight Outta Compton on the heels of its success, and Savidge received a nomination for Best Original Screenplay at the 88th Academy Awards.

He founded the production company Xenon Pictures in 1986.

== Filmography ==
=== As a producer ===
- 2015: Straight Outta Death Row (Documentary) (executive producer)
- 2015: Straight Outta Compton (co-executive producer)
- 2011: Biebermania! (Video documentary) (executive producer)
- 2010: The 1984 Los Angeles Comedy Competition with Host Jay Leno (Video) (producer)
- 2008: Straight Outta Puerto Rico: Reggaeton's Rough Road to Glory(Video) (executive producer - as Leigh Savidge)
- 2006: The Harder They Come (restored version) (executive producer)
- 2005: The Luau (executive producer)
- 2004: Eminem AKA (Video documentary) (executive producer)
- 2003: Malibooty! (Video) (executive producer)
- 2003: The Legend of Dolemite: Bigger & Badder (Video documentary) (executive producer)
- 2002: Flatland (TV Series) (executive producer - 1 episode)
- 2001: Welcome to Death Row (Video documentary) (executive producer)
- 2000: Rudy Ray Moore: Live at Wetlands (Video) (co-executive producer)
- 1997: Mahalia Jackson: The Power and the Glory (executive producer)
- 1997: Mahalia Jackson Sings the Songs of Christmas (Documentary) (executive producer)
- 1994: Dr. Martin Luther King, Jr.: A Historical Perspective (Documentary) (executive producer)
- 1994: The Legend of Dolemite (Documentary) (producer)
- 1990: Twisted Justice (executive producer)

=== As a director ===
- 2010: The 1984 Los Angeles Comedy Competition with Host Jay Leno (Video)
- 2008: Straight Outta Puerto Rico: Reggaeton's Rough Road to Glory (Video) (as Leigh Savidge)
- 2001: Welcome to Death Row (Video documentary)

=== As a writer ===
- 2015: Straight Outta Compton (story)
- 1994: The Legend of Dolemite

=== As an editor ===
- 1986: The Supernaturals (assistant editor)
- 1986: The Ladies Club (assistant editor - as Leigh Savidge)

== Other credits ==
- 2002: Biggie and Tupac (Documentary special thank)

=== Accolades ===
Award	Category	Recipients and nominees	Work	Result	Ref
Academy Awards	Best Original Screenplay	Shared with: Andrea Berloff; Jonathan Herman; Alan Wenkus	Straight Outta Compton	Nominated	
