= Andrea Berloff =

American screenwriter

- Born: April 7, 1974 (age 52); Framingham, Massachusetts, U.S.
- Education: Cornell University
- Occupation: Filmmaker
- Years active: 1997–present
- Notable work: World Trade Center; Straight Outta Compton
- Spouse: Drew Filus (m. 2004)
- Children: 2

Andrea Berloff (born April 7, 1974) is an American screenwriter, actress, director, and producer. Berloff is best known for writing the screenplays for the drama films World Trade Center and Straight Outta Compton, receiving an Academy Award nomination for the latter. In 2019, Berloff made her directorial debut with The Kitchen.

== Early life ==
Andrea Berloff was born to a Jewish family in Framingham, Massachusetts in 1974. She attended Framingham South High School until she graduated in 1991. Upon graduating high school, Berloff attended Cornell University to study drama which she then graduated from in 1995.

== Career ==
=== Acting ===
Berloff's brief acting career began shortly after she graduated from college. In 1997, she played the role of the nameless sister in the Tisch School of the Arts produced film Growth, directed by Joel Hopkins.

In 2001, Berloff was cast in a minor role as a popular high school girl for the short film Eyeball Eddie, directed by Elizabeth Allen Rosenbaum. The film starred Martin Starr and depicted the story of a boy named Eddie with a prosthetic glass eye, who discovers the benefits of using his glass eye as a diversion tactic in his wrestling competitions.

In 2005, Berloff acted as the executive producer and played the role of Dr. Schwartz in the independent film Raw Footage, directed by Drew Filus. The film acted as Berloff's producing debut in the film industry. Raw footage depicts a family reunion at the renewal of a family member's marriage vows in California. Raw Footage went on to win the Audience Award for Best Feature at the Washington DC Independent Film Festival.

=== Writing ===
In 2002, Berloff along with Drew Filus, co-wrote the short film Domestic, in which Filus also acted as director. The film depicted the story of a man trying to find a model who recently left him.

In 2006, Berloff wrote the screenplay for the film World Trade Center, directed by Oliver Stone. The film marked her screenwriting debut for feature-length films. The film starred Nicolas Cage and Michael Peña as two policeman who were trapped in the rubble after the attacks on the World Trade Center during 9/11. The Jewish Journal of Greater Los Angeles reported that when writing the script, Berloff described that she did not want to create another disaster movie or epic film about American patriotism. Instead she set out to write the film as "a tribute to the survivors and the people who aided in saving them during 9/11." The idea was for her to keep the film "non-political." They also reported that Berloff conducted much research for writing the script. She interviewed many survivors from the traumatic event including the two policeman the film is based on, John McLoughlin and Will Jimeno. The film took several months to write due to her extensive amount of research along with the stress of her responsibility to convey the story properly. Before production of the film, director Oliver Stone, assured Berloff that he would remain faithful to the script she wrote. Berloff`s work on the script was seen as a success and even earned her a spot on Variety`s list of 10 screenwriters to watch. In 2006, Berloff also made her debut in playwriting with her work on Girl Scouts of America, a play depicting the activities of four girls, two of them being counselors, earning their Girl Scout badges at camp. She co-wrote the play alongside of Mona Monsieur, where they presented it at the New York International Fringe Festival.

In 2006, Empire reported that she had been hired to write the screenplay for Ridley Scott's upcoming biopic on the Italian fashion designer Aldo Gucci. The film faced many concerns during its development, specifically from some of the Gucci family members, regarding the portrayal of their family; The film was eventually released in 2021 as House of Gucci, though Berloff remains uncredited.

In 2013, Deadline Hollywood reported that Berloff was tasked with writing the screenplay for Universal Studios’ Legend of Conan. The film will serve as a sequel to the 1982 film Conan The Barbarian but will ignore the 1984 sequel Conan The Destroyer and the 2011 reboot starring Jason Momoa. The film will see the return of Arnold Schwarzenegger, taking on the role of Conan once again after more than three decades from the initial film’s release. The film is still in development and has no set date for production or release just yet.

In 2015, Berloff co-wrote the screenplay for the biographical drama Straight Outta Compton, directed by F. Gary Gray, which depicted the rise and fall of the popular rap group N.W.A. Berloff adapted the screenplay alongside of Jonathan Herman, from the story which was written by S. Leigh Savidge and Alan Wenkus. In an interview with Awards Daily, Berloff stated that she was hired to write the script in 2010 and upon being hired, began working closely with former N.W.A member Ice Cube and Tomica Woods-Wright, widow to deceased member Eazy-E. Berloff also described that once she was hired, her job was to "truly transform a script that mostly encompassed Eazy-E into something that represented the entire N.W.A. group." She decided to approach the film as not just a film about a rap group but to incorporate all the societal issues in America at the time of the group's prominence. Berloff described that one of the challenges she had to face was the issue of getting different accounts of the same story from multiple people. Despite this, Berloff managed to find common ground with each person and was able to tell the story in a beneficial way for everyone involved. Straight Outta Compton received positive reviews from critics and gained numerous award nominations for its screenplay. Berloff along with Jonathan Herman, S. Leigh Savidge and Alan Wenkus were all nominated for their work on the film`s screenplay at the Satellite Awards, the Writers Guild of America Awards and at the 88th Academy Awards.

In 2015, Empire reported that Berloff, along with story writer Nicolas Saada, was hired to write the screenplay for the film Sleepless, directed by Baran bo Odar. The film serves as a remake to the 2011 French thriller film Nuit Blanche. Sleepless Night is set to release in 2016 and will star Jamie Foxx as a cop whose family comes in danger after he betrays his connections in the criminal underworld.

In 2016, Berloff co-wrote the screenplay for the film Blood Father, directed by Jean-François Richet. The film stars Mel Gibson as a former convict who reunites with his daughter in order to save her from impending drug dealers. Berloff co-wrote the script alongside of Peter Craig, which was adapted from his novel of the same name.

In 2022, Berloff and John Gatins signed a creative partnership with Netflix.

== Personal life ==
Berloff is married with two children, and currently resides in Los Angeles.

== Filmography ==
=== Film ===
| Year | Title | Director | Writer |
|---|---|---|---|
| 2006 | World Trade Center | No | Yes |
| 2015 | Straight Outta Compton | No | Yes |
| 2016 | Blood Father | No | Yes |
| 2017 | Sleepless | No | Yes |
| 2019 | The Kitchen | Yes | Yes |
| 2023 | The Mother | No | Yes |
| TBA | The Last Mrs. Parrish | No | Yes |
| TBA | Fight for '84 | No | Yes |

Executive producer

- Raw Footage (2005)

Acting credit

| Year | Title | Role |
|---|---|---|
| 2005 | Raw Footage | Dr. Schwartz |

=== Short film ===
| Year | Title | Credit | Role |
|---|---|---|---|
| 1997 | Growth | Actress | Nameless Sister |
| 2001 | Eyeball Eddie | Actress | Popular Girl |
| 2002 | Domestic | Writer | |

=== Play ===
| Year | Title | Credit |
|---|---|---|
| 2006 | Girl Scouts of America | Writer |

== Awards and nominations ==
In 2016, Berloff was nominated for several awards for her work on Straight Outta Compton:

Along with Jonathan Herman, she was nominated for Best Original Screenplay at the Satellite Awards.

She was also nominated for a Writers Guild of America Award for Best Original Screenplay along with Herman, S. Leigh Savidge and Alan Wenkus.

Lastly, she was nominated for Best Original Screenplay at the 88th Academy Awards alongside Herman, Savidge and Wenkus.
