= Straight Outta Compton (film) =

2015 film by F. Gary Gray

- Theatrical release poster
- Directed by: F. Gary Gray
- Screenplay by: Jonathan Herman; Andrea Berloff
- Story by: S. Leigh Savidge; Alan Wenkus; Andrea Berloff
- Produced by: Ice Cube; Tomica Woods-Wright; Dr. Dre; Matt Alvarez; F. Gary Gray; Scott Bernstein
- Starring: O'Shea Jackson Jr.; Corey Hawkins; Jason Mitchell; Paul Giamatti
- Cinematography: Matthew Libatique
- Edited by: Billy Fox; Michael Tronick
- Music by: Joseph Trapanese
- Production companies: Legendary Pictures; New Line Cinema (Note: Associate credit only.); Cube Vision; Crucial Films; Broken Chair Flickz
- Distributed by: Universal Pictures
- Release dates: August 11, 2015 (Microsoft Theater); August 14, 2015 (United States)
- Running time: 147 minutes
- Country: United States
- Language: English
- Budget: $28–50 million
- Box office: $201.6 million

Straight Outta Compton is a 2015 American biographical drama film that tells the story of hip-hop group N.W.A's rise and fall under manager Jerry Heller. The film, directed by F. Gary Gray, stars O'Shea Jackson Jr., Corey Hawkins, and Jason Mitchell as Ice Cube, Dr. Dre, and Eazy-E, respectively. Released by Universal Pictures on August 14, 2015, the film received positive reviews and was a box office success, grossing $201.6 million worldwide. Straight Outta Compton earned several awards and nominations, including an Academy Award nomination for Best Original Screenplay and a win for Outstanding Motion Picture at the 47th NAACP Image Awards.

== Plot ==
In 1986, Compton, California, Eazy-E narrowly evades a police raid at a crack house. The following day, Dr. Dre is struggling with what he wants to do in life and is confronted by his mother for missing a job interview. Meanwhile, Ice Cube is a high school senior aspiring to become a rapper. Intrigued by Cube's "reality raps" reflecting on the crime, gang violence and police harassment that they and other African Americans have endured recently, Dre convinces Eazy to fund a startup record label, Ruthless Records, with Dre as record producer. When their song "Boyz-n-the-Hood" is rejected by a New York rap group, Dre convinces Eazy to perform it instead. It becomes a local hit, and Eazy, Cube, Dre, DJ Yella and MC Ren form the group N.W.A ("Niggaz Wit Attitudes").

Eazy accepts Jerry Heller's offer to manage N.W.A and co-run Ruthless, and Priority Records offers N.W.A a record deal. While recording their debut album, Straight Outta Compton (1989), the group is harassed by police due to their race and appearance, prompting Cube to compose a diss track—"Fuck tha Police"—toward the police. Having witnessed the altercation and being disgusted by the officers, Heller allows the track without hesitation. The album becomes a controversial hit due to its explicit lyrics, and the group's style is dubbed gangsta rap by the press. During a 1989 concert tour, the FBI demands that N.W.A not perform "Fuck tha Police", claiming that it encourages violence against law enforcement. Police in Detroit forbid them from performing the song, but they perform it anyway. The concert stalls and the police arrest the group, resulting in a riot that results in their release.

Heller delays the individual members' contracts with Ruthless, and when he insists that Cube sign without legal representation, Cube leaves the group. His debut solo album, AmeriKKKa's Most Wanted (1990), is released, but when Priority Records is unable to pay him his advance on his next album, he wrecks the label head's office.

When N.W.A heavily insults Cube on their next record, 100 Miles and Runnin' (1990), he responds with the diss track "No Vaseline", criticizing them and Heller. This, combined with Cube's association with the Nation of Islam, outspoken criticism of the Los Angeles Police Department in the wake of the beating of Rodney King, and a starring role in the 1991 film Boyz n the Hood, makes him even more famous and controversial.

Dre hires the imposing Bloods gang member Suge Knight as his manager after Knight proves that Heller has been underpaying him. Dre leaves N.W.A to form Death Row Records with Knight, who has his men threaten Heller and beat Eazy-E to pressure them to release Dre from his contract with Ruthless. Dre enjoys his newfound freedom and begins working with other rappers, including Tupac and then-newcomer Snoop Dogg. His debut solo album, The Chronic (1992), sells more than five million copies and is critically acclaimed, even as he becomes concerned about Knight's violent behavior and the community is rocked by the 1992 Los Angeles riots.

Eazy, whose fortunes and health have declined, is devastated by the comparative success of his former bandmates. Learning that Heller has been embezzling money from Ruthless from the beginning, Eazy fires Heller, and decides to rekindle his friendships with Cube and Dre, who agree to an N.W.A reunion. During the reunion, Eazy collapses and is admitted to the hospital, where he is diagnosed with HIV/AIDS. Amid emotional visits from his bandmates, Eazy dies on March 26, 1995, and is mourned by fans.

Dre parts ways with Knight and Death Row a year later to form his own label, Aftermath Entertainment. Cube subsequently becomes successful as a film actor, and Dre finds success as a producer and entrepreneur. Several famous rappers such as Kendrick Lamar, Eminem and 50 Cent credit Dre with helping to launch their careers, and Beats Electronics, which Dre co-founded, is bought by Apple Inc. in 2014 for $3.2 billion.

== Cast ==
- O'Shea Jackson Jr. as O'Shea "Ice Cube" Jackson Sr.
- Corey Hawkins as Andre "Dr. Dre" Young
- Jason Mitchell as Eric "Eazy-E" Wright
- Neil Brown Jr. as Antoine "DJ Yella" Carraby
- Aldis Hodge as Lorenzo "MC Ren" Patterson
- Paul Giamatti as Jerry Heller
- Marlon Yates Jr. as Tracy "The D.O.C." Curry
- R. Marcos Taylor (credited as R. Marcus Taylor) as Marion "Suge" Knight
- LaKeith Stanfield as Calvin "Snoop Dogg" Broadus
- Alexandra Shipp as Kimberly Woodruff
- Corey Reynolds as Alonzo Williams, club owner and member of Dr. Dre and DJ Yella's pre-N.W.A group World Class Wreckin' Cru
- Tate Ellington as Bryan Turner, head of Priority Records
- Sheldon A. Smith as "Warren G" Griffin III
- Carra Patterson as Tomica Wright, Eazy-E's girlfriend and eventual wife.
- Elena Goode as Nicole Threatt, Dr. Dre's wife
- Keith Powers as Tyree Crayon, Dr. Dre's half-brother
- Mark Sherman as Jimmy Iovine, CEO of Interscope Records
- LaDell Preston plays Jerome "Shorty" Muhammad, member of Ice Cube's post-N.W.A group Da Lench Mob
- Cleavon McClendon as Anthony "Sir Jinx" Wheaton, a member of Ice Cube's pre-N.W.A group C.I.A.
- Rogelio Douglas Jr. as Carlton "Chuck D" Ridenhour of The Bomb Squad, producers of Ice Cube's solo album AmeriKKKa's Most Wanted
- Steve Turner as "Keith Shocklee" Boxley, member of The Bomb Squad
- Tyron Woodley as Terry "T-Bone" Gray, member of Ice Cube's post-N.W.A group Da Lench Mob
- Marcc Rose as Tupac Shakur, with Darris Love providing the character's voice
- F. Gary Gray as KDAY disc jockey Greg Mack
- Brandon Lafourche as Kim "Arabian Prince" Nazel
- Orlando Brown as Block
- Demetrius Grosse as Rock
- Matt Corboy as Journalist

== Production ==
=== Development ===
In March 2009, it was announced that the film was in development at New Line Cinema, with S. Leigh Savidge and Alan Wenkus writing, and Tomica Woods-Wright, Ice Cube, and Dr. Dre set to produce the film. In May 2010, it was announced Andrea Berloff would write a draft of the screenplay. In September 2011, John Singleton told The Playlist that he was in talks to direct the film, saying: "I can't talk about it too prematurely about the stuff I'm doing because nothing's come to fruition yet, but Cube and I are talking about doing the N.W.A story. The script is really, really good, and so we're just figuring it out. New Line really wants to make it."

Also in September 2011, F. Gary Gray, Craig Brewer, and Peter Berg were in talks to direct the film. In April 2012, Gray was selected as director. Gray had worked with Ice Cube on the film Friday and Dre on the film Set It Off. He has also directed some of their music videos. By 2013 the film was picked up by Universal Studios, who, in December of that year, hired Jonathan Herman to write a new draft of the script and brought in Will Packer to executive produce, alongside Adam Merims, Alan Wenkus David Engel, Bill Straus, Thomas Tull, and Jon Jashni.

=== Casting ===
Casting calls began in the middle of 2010. There had been rumors of Lil Eazy-E playing his late father Eazy-E, and Ice Cube's son and fellow rapper O'Shea Jackson Jr. playing his father as well. Ice Cube said of the movie, "We're taking it to the nooks and crannies, I think deeper than any other article or documentary on the group," he said. "These are the intimate conversations that helped forge N.W.A. To me, I think it's interesting to anybody who loves that era and I don't know any other movie where you can mix gangster rap, the FBI, L.A. riots, HIV, and fucking feuding with each other. This movie has everything from Daryl Gates and the battering ram."

On February 21, 2014, director Gray announced a March 9, 2014 open casting call for the film in Gardena, California, via his Twitter account. There were also open casting calls in Atlanta and Chicago. Rapper YG auditioned to play MC Ren in the film. The project was scheduled to start filming in April 2014, but was pushed back due to casting delays.

On June 18, 2014, Universal officially announced that the film would be released theatrically on August 14, 2015. It was also confirmed that Ice Cube's son, O'Shea Jackson Jr., would play a younger version of his father in the film. O'Shea Jr. joined Jason Mitchell and Corey Hawkins who portrayed group members Eazy-E and Dr. Dre respectively. In early July 2014, casting directors for the film issued a casting call for extras and vintage cars in the Los Angeles area. The casting call release stated that filming would begin in August 2014. In July 2014, it was confirmed Aldis Hodge would portray MC Ren and Neil Brown Jr. would play DJ Yella. On August 15, 2014, Paul Giamatti joined the cast to play N.W.A's manager Jerry Heller. On August 26, 2014, LaKeith Stanfield joined the cast to play Snoop Dogg.

On June 16, 2015, Ice Cube revealed that a "Tupac scene" had been shot for the film. Entertainment Weekly reported that the role of Tupac Shakur in the film would be played by newcomer Marcc Rose who was once rumored to be cast by John Singleton in his unmade Tupac biopic. Rose later reprised the role of Shakur in the first and only season of the true crime drama series Unsolved.

==== Casting of female extras ====
On July 16, 2014, a casting call for extras for Straight Outta Compton was released on the Sande Alessi Casting Facebook page. The casting call was looking for African-American girls for the film using an A-D ranking scale. Though the "A girls" category was looking for "classy" women of all colors, the "B through D" categories were very explicitly linked with skin-tone. As the women get less attractive, the casting call wants the women's flesh tone to be darker, with the lowest listing calling for "African American girls. Poor, not in good shape. Medium to dark skin tone."

The casting call was accused of colorism, sexism, and racism in the categorizing of black women. A representative for Sande Alessi Casting said the ad was an "innocent mistake" and when it comes to casting "poor" people, they are also looking for women of various skin tones and body types. As for the A, B, C, D grouping system, Sande Alessi Casting says "it's the usual method [they] use to look for different types of people for any project and it wasn't meant to offend anyone."

=== Filming ===
Straight Outta Compton was filmed in Compton and Los Angeles, California. Principal photography began on location in Compton on August 5, 2014. In early September 2014, principal exterior shooting on a large post-riot set was observed on Laurel Canyon Boulevard in North Hollywood. While shooting in California, the production spent $50 million in the state and received the California Film & Television Tax Credit.

Costume designer Kelli Jones says "the script was literally changing the entire time we were shooting, I mean literally the entire time. There would be days where I would get a call on Friday and they were like 'oh by the way we've moved the pool party scene to Monday' and the pool party scene had like 400 people and I needed to get '80s bathing suits, so there wasn't a single weekend where me and my team [sic] were not working. It was insane!" Production designer Shane Valentino said "We had 130 sets which is a lot of sets to try and deal with."

==== Violence on set ====
Seven days into filming in Compton, a drive-by shooting took place directly in front of the cast and crew members while they were on the set. A group of men standing outside the Compton Courthouse flashed gang signs at a passing car and passengers in the car opened fire on the group. No one affiliated with the film was injured, but one other person near the set was shot. Despite the incident, filming continued to take place as planned in the city.

On January 29, 2015, Suge Knight was involved in a hit-and-run incident that left one man dead and another hospitalized. After an argument on the Straight Outta Compton film set, witnesses claim that Knight followed the men to a burger stand parking lot in Compton, and that the collisions looked intentional. Security footage video was released online in early March showing Knight running over both men but which Knight's attorney said helps his client's self-defense claim. Terry Carter, co-founder (along with Ice Cube) of Heavyweight Records and a friend of Knight, was the man killed. The second victim, filmmaker Cle Sloan, suffered a mangled foot and head injuries. Knight was arrested for the incident. In October 2018, he pleaded no contest to voluntary manslaughter in the case in a Los Angeles courtroom and was sentenced to 28 years in prison.

In October 2017, transcripts from a grand jury hearing earlier in the year indicated Knight allegedly gave multiple menacing warnings to director F. Gary Gray during filming. Although Gray would testify he did not recall any calls or texts threatening his safety (a move Deputy District Attorney Cynthia Barnes referred to as intentional perjury out of fear), Knight was allegedly angry at his depiction in the film and that he was not compensated for his portrayal.

== Release ==
=== Marketing ===
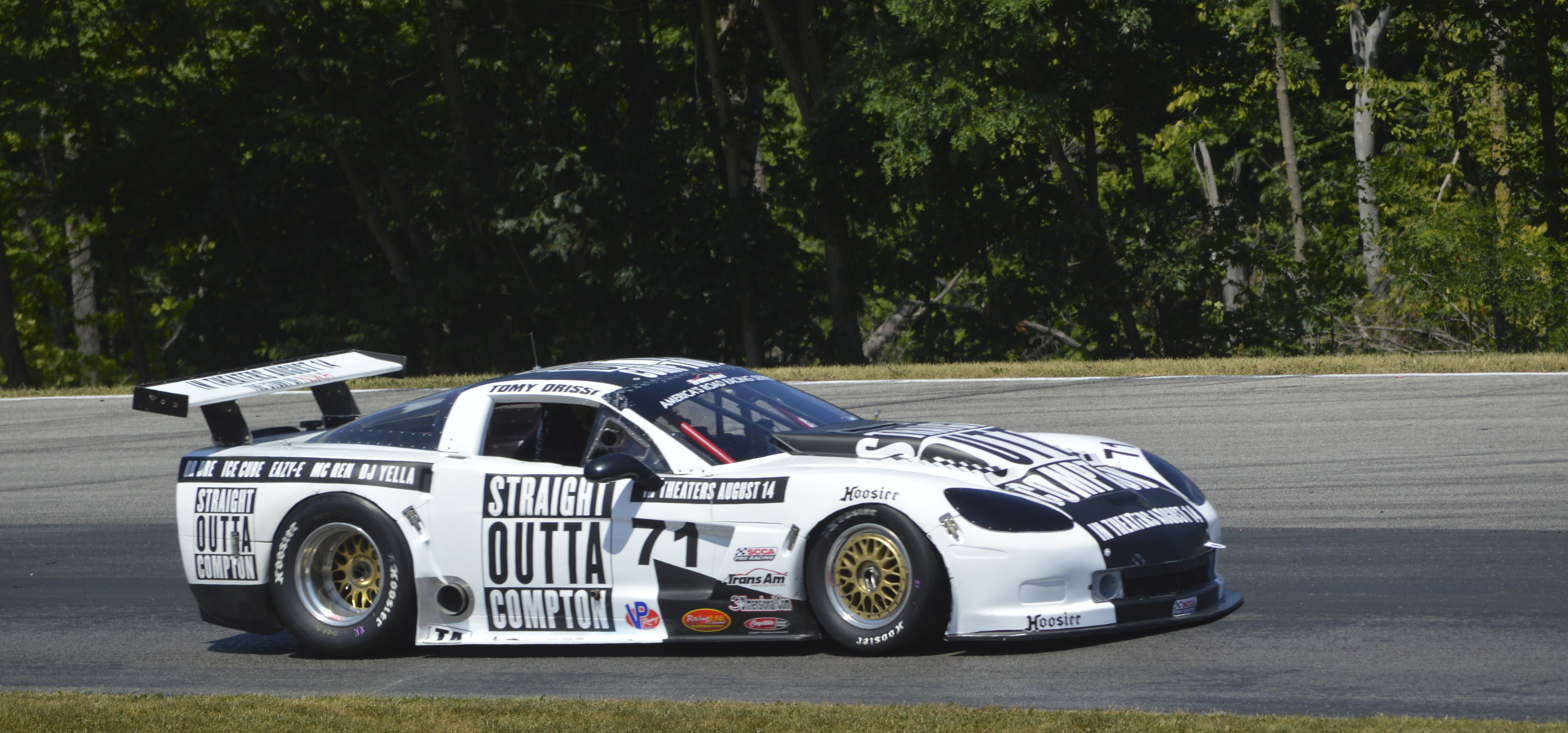
Straight Outta Compton sponsored Trans-Am Series Chevrolet Corvette

In December 2014, during a show in Sydney, Australia, Ice Cube gave concertgoers a sneak peek at a trailer for Straight Outta Compton. When an executive producer of the film, Will Packer, was asked if Cube told him he was going to show the trailer or did he "just put it out there?", Packer responded, "Cube does what he does." He added, "Cube is the man. We back him. And I love the fact that it's out there and it's getting the response that it's getting, that's what I'll say."

On February 8, 2015, Universal released the first official trailer for Straight Outta Compton. The red band trailer was preceded by an introduction featuring N.W.A members Dr. Dre and Ice Cube. A second global trailer for Straight Outta Compton was released on April 1, 2015, and was attached with theatrical screenings of Universal's Furious 7.

On August 7, 2015, to help promote the film, Beats by Dre launched a new app through the website StraightOuttaSomewhere.com. The app allows users to create a meme by uploading a picture with the "Straight Outta" logo and fill in the blank with a location of their choice. Some people did proclaim that they were "Straight Outta" a certain city or locale, while others uploaded funny images and phrases. In under 24 hours, over 78,000 "Straight Outta" images were downloaded on social media sites and over 6 million downloads were generated before the film's opening day. Inquisitr.com proclaimed, "It's a successful viral photo campaign that is definitely bringing attention to the movie Straight Outta Compton."

Despite the name, the Straight Outta Compton did not premiere in Compton, since there were no movie theaters in the city at the time of its release.

=== Security concerns ===
Straight Outta Compton premiered on August 10, 2015, at the entertainment complex LA Live in Los Angeles, California. An earlier report by LA Weekly said that the LAPD was "beefing up its presence" for the event; The Hollywood Reporter said that organizers had tripled security. Due to concerns surrounding the violence in the film, it was reported that movie theaters hired extra security during the film's opening weekend and Universal Studios would reimburse them. Universal denied that it would reimburse them, but would partner with theaters seeking "support". No major incidents were reported at showings during the film's opening weekend. Some critics said it was because of the extra security at some theaters, while others argued that it showed the extra security was unnecessary.

=== Home media ===
Straight Outta Compton was released on Digital HD on January 5, 2016, by Universal Pictures Home Entertainment and on Blu-ray and DVD on January 19, 2016. The Blu-ray and DVD includes both the theatrical version and an Unrated Director's Cut which featured 20 additional minutes of the film.

Universal Pictures announced a 4K Blu-ray release including both cuts of the film to be released on February 6, 2018.

== Reception ==
=== Box office ===
Straight Outta Compton grossed $161.2 million in the United States and Canada and $40.4 million in other territories for a worldwide total of $201.6 million. Deadline Hollywood calculated the net profit of the film to be $91.1 million, when factoring together all expenses and revenues for the film.

In the United States and Canada, the opening weekend projections were continuously revised upwards, starting from $25 million and going as high as $45 million. The film made $5 million from Thursday night shows, which began at 7 p.m. in 2,264 theaters. After its strong Thursday night showing, Universal was able to add nearly 500 theaters for the film's opening weekend. Straight Outta Compton made $24.1 million on its opening day, the fourth biggest August opening in history.

It finished first at the box office in its opening weekend earning $60.2 million from 2,757 theaters and ahead of the week's other new release The Man from U.N.C.L.E. 46% of its opening weekend audience was African American while 23% was non-Hispanic White and 21% Hispanic. Its opening weekend total was the fifth-best August opening weekend of all time (behind Guardians of the Galaxy, The Bourne Ultimatum, Rush Hour 2 and Teenage Mutant Ninja Turtles) the highest in August for an R-rated film (surpassing American Pie 2) and the highest for a musical biopic.

It also set the record for best opening by a film with an African American director, until it was passed by Gray's own The Fate of the Furious in April 2017. After a strong first full week showing ($84.7 million), Universal added the film to over 200 additional theaters. The film grossed $26.4 million in its second weekend and again finished first at the box office, ahead of the week's new releases Sinister 2, Hitman: Agent 47, and American Ultra.

On August 27, 2015, Straight Outta Compton became the highest grossing musical biopic of all time in the United States with $120.9 million, passing the 2005 Johnny Cash biopic Walk the Line's $119.5 million total (it was then passed itself on December 1, 2018, by Bohemian Rhapsody's $162 million). The film grossed $13.1 million in its third weekend and, once again, finished first at the box office ahead of the week's new releases War Room, No Escape and We Are Your Friends.

On September 18, 2015, the film's domestic gross crossed $157.5 million, surpassing Keenen Ivory Wayans' Scary Movie ($157 million) to become the all-time highest domestic grossing film from a black director in the United States. This record was surpassed by Gray's own The Fate of the Furious in April 2017. By September 21, 2015, the film had grossed $188 million worldwide to become the all-time highest grossing music biopic, surpassing Walk the Line's $186.4 million worldwide gross, again, passed itself by Bohemian Rhapsody in November 2018.

=== Critical response ===
On review aggregator Rotten Tomatoes the film has an approval rating of 89% based on 248 reviews with an average rating of 7.40/10. The site's consensus reads, "Straight Outta Compton is a biopic that's built to last, thanks to F. Gary Gray's confident direction and engaging performances from a solid cast." On Metacritic, it has a weighted average score of 72 out of 100, based on 41 critics, indicating "generally favorable reviews".

Richard Roeper of the Chicago Sun-Times awarded the film 3.5 stars out of 4, calling the film "enthralling" and "energized", praising the cast for delivering "strong, memorable work that transcends mere imitation." He called the film "one of the better musical biopics of the last 20 years".

Peter Travers of Rolling Stone, also giving the film 3.5 out of 4 stars, praised the picture for its honesty in its portrayal of the group and complemented Jackson's performance as Ice Cube, as well as the supporting cast, finding Mitchell's Eazy-E "award-caliber". He did wish that the film elaborated more on the group's troubles involving misogyny, homophobia, and the media. Joe Morgenstern of The Wall Street Journal found the group's musical performances to be "far and away the most appealing parts of the picture." However, he criticized the film for slowing down towards the end, particularly when it gets "ploddingly sentimental" once it focuses on the decline and death of Eazy-E.

Scott Foundas of Variety praised director Gray for taking familiar biopic paces and bringing a "richness of observation to the table that transcends cliche." He also praised the film for its "high but never overindulgent" style and the attention to detail in the production, ranging from the "exhaustively researched" screenplay to the "meticulous care" involved in assembling the film's soundtrack. He stated, "if Compton is undeniably of the moment, it's also timeless in its depiction of how artists and writers transform the world around them into angry, profane, vibrant and singular personal expression." Michael Phillips of the Chicago Tribune stated, "Straight Outta Compton at its best evokes the heady atmosphere of Crenshaw Boulevard and what the group's success meant to Compton, and vice versa. When the songs themselves take center stage the movie works. What remains in the wings constitutes another, fuller story."

In a mixed review, Kenneth Turan of the Los Angeles Times felt that the film attempted to take on more storylines than it could handle, also criticizing how bloated it becomes towards the end regarding Heller. However, he did praise Giamatti's performance. Jordan Hoffman of The Guardian also criticized the film's second half for being "cheesy" and "[playing] it too safe". Ignatiy Vishnevetsky of The A.V. Club gave the film a C, feeling it had to rely on its timeliness for its thematic weight, and saying the film "simplifies N.W.A.'s arc to a gangster-movie knock-off about three friends from way back when who are driven apart by bad influences." Alyssa Rosenberg of The Washington Post noted the film's "lack of interest in process and personality" compared with the concurrently released music biopic Love & Mercy, writing: "it's no contest as to which Giamatti picture is the better depiction of the actual music-making process."

=== Accolades ===
The film received numerous award nominations, including one for Best Original Screenplay at the Oscars.

Award	Category	Recipients	Result
AARP Annual Movies for Grownups Awards	Best Intergenerational Film		Nominated
AARP Annual Movies for Grownups Awards	Best Time Capsule		Nominated
Academy Awards	Best Original Screenplay	Jonathan Herman, Andrea Berloff, S. Leigh Savidge and Alan Wenkus	Nominated
African-American Film Critics Association	Best Picture		Won
African-American Film Critics Association	Best Ensemble		Won
African-American Film Critics Association	Best Supporting Actor	Jason Mitchell	Won
Alliance of Women Film Journalists	Best Ensemble Cast		Won
American Film Institute	Top Ten Films		Won
Black Reel Awards	Best Film		Nominated
Black Reel Awards	Best Director	F. Gary Gray	Nominated
Black Reel Awards	Best Supporting Actor	Jason Mitchell	Nominated
Black Reel Awards	Best Supporting Actor	Corey Hawkins	Nominated
Black Reel Awards	Best Breakthrough Performance (male)	Jason Mitchell	Nominated
Black Reel Awards	Best Breakthrough Performance (male)	O'Shea Jackson Jr.	Nominated
Black Reel Awards	Best Cast (ensemble)	Victoria Thomas & Cindy Tolan (casting directors)	Won
Black Reel Awards	Best Original or Adapted Song	"Talking to My Diary" - by Dr. Dre	Nominated
Black Reel Awards	Outstanding Original Score	Joseph Trapanese	Won
Casting Society of America	Big Budget – Drama	Cindy Tolan, Victoria Thomas, Meagan Lewis, Beth Sepko, Carolyn Pickman, Lucinda Syson, Pat Moran	Won
Critics' Choice Awards	Best Acting Ensemble		Nominated
Empire Awards	Best Male Newcomer	Jason Mitchell	Nominated
Empire Awards	Best Soundtrack		Nominated
Florida Film Critics Circle	Best Ensemble		Nominated
Hamptons International Film Festival	Breakthrough Performer	Jason Mitchell	Won
Hamptons International Film Festival	Breakthrough Performer	Keith Stanfield	Won
Hollywood Film Awards	Hollywood Breakout Ensemble Award	Corey Hawkins, O'Shea Jackson Jr. & Jason Mitchell	Won
MTV Movie Awards	Movie of the Year		Nominated
MTV Movie Awards	Best Breakthrough Performance	O'Shea Jackson Jr.	Nominated
MTV Movie Awards	True Story		Won
NAACP Image Awards	Outstanding Motion Picture		Won
NAACP Image Awards	Outstanding Supporting Actor in a Motion Picture	Corey Hawkins	Nominated
NAACP Image Awards	Outstanding Supporting Actor in a Motion Picture	O'Shea Jackson Jr.	Won
NAACP Image Awards	Outstanding Writing in a Motion Picture	Jonathan Herman, Andrea Berloff, S. Leigh Savidge and Alan Wenkus	Nominated
NAACP Image Awards	Outstanding Directing in a Motion Picture	F. Gary Gray	Nominated
National Board of Review	Top Ten Films		Won
People's Choice Awards	Favorite Dramatic Movie		Nominated
Producers Guild of America Awards	Best Theatrical Motion Picture	Ice Cube & Matt Alvarez, F. Gary Gray, Dr. Dre, Scott Bernstein	Nominated
San Diego Film Critics Society	Best Use Of Music In A Film		Nominated
San Diego Film Critics Society	Best Ensemble		Nominated
Satellite Awards	Best Original Screenplay	Jonathan Herman, Andrea Berloff, S. Leigh Savidge and Alan Wenkus	Nominated
Screen Actors Guild Awards	Outstanding Performance by a Cast in a Motion Picture	Neil Brown Jr., Paul Giamatti, Corey Hawkins, Aldis Hodge, O'Shea Jackson Jr. and Jason Mitchell	Nominated
St. Louis Gateway Film Critics Association	Best Soundtrack		Nominated
Teen Choice Awards	Choice Movie: Drama		Nominated
Teen Choice Awards	Choice Movie Actor: Drama	O'Shea Jackson Jr.	Nominated
Washington D.C. Area Film Critics Association	Best Acting Ensemble		Nominated
Writers Guild of America Awards	Best Original Screenplay	Jonathan Herman, Andrea Berloff, S. Leigh Savidge and Alan Wenkus	Nominated

== Historical accuracy ==
Straight Outta Compton stays fairly close to the overall truth of how N.W.A. came together, while the exact details are sometimes re-arranged.

- In the film, the formation of N.W.A happens after Dre punches a man who attacks his little brother one night. He is arrested, and Eazy bails him out of jail. According to recorded N.W.A lore, Dre did land in jail, but it was over unpaid tickets on his Mazda RX-7. He paged Eazy to bail him out and, to return the favor, agreed to produce a track for a record label Eazy wanted to start.
- In the film, Cube and Dre's first show together takes place at local club. Dre is DJing there with Yella in a puffy, lavender jacket and warns Cube that the crowd will be tough. Cube wins over the crowd with "Gangsta Gangsta". Eazy and MC Ren are the only Crips in a crowd of mostly Bloods. The show actually happened at a Compton skating rink in which there was an overwhelming presence of Bloods. Cube did perform "Gangsta Gangsta", but mostly did dirty parodies of popular tracks. Dre's costumes were reserved for his first group World Class Wreckin' Cru.
- In the film, Heller hears "Boyz-in-the-Hood" and asks Eazy to go into business together. They later form Ruthless Records and Heller lands N.W.A a deal with Priority Records after a show in a roller rink. In his 2007 memoir "Ruthless", Heller (who was not involved with the film) says that it was Eazy who sought him out, not the other way around, and he even paid a mutual acquaintance $750 to make an introduction. The Priority deal went down the week after N.W.A played a successful show at a local roller rink.
- In the film, NWA is brutally harassed by racist cops who hate rappers for looking like gangbangers as an outraged Heller looks on in shock. Soon afterward Cube writes some lyrics, Dre gives his approval, and they quickly begin recording "Fuck tha Police". In real life, members of N.W.A did get harassed by cops outside of Audio Achievements while recording Straight Outta Compton in 1987. But Cube had the concept for "Fuck tha Police" long before Dre was on board, despite Dre's own frustrations with law enforcement.
- In the film, Ice Cube finally quits N.W.A after voicing his displeasure over his contract status with Heller and Eazy. In his book, Heller claims the group voted Cube out at the end of their first tour because of his griping about proper compensation. Ice Cube has said he thought it was ridiculous that Eazy and Heller were driving luxury cars and living in mansions while he still lived with his parents. But departing N.W.A. was not an easy decision. He secretly consulted with publicist Pat Charbonnet (who isn't portrayed in the film), who facilitated his solo deal with Priority Records.
- In the film, Knight and his goons beat up Eazy to get him to release Dre from the label. Dre has denied knowing of Knight's plans that night in 1991. In real life, Suge Knight told Eazy-E that he had kidnapped Jerry Heller and was holding him prisoner in a van. This did not convince Eazy-E to release Dr. Dre and The D.O.C. from Ruthless, and Suge Knight threatened Eazy-E's family. He gave Eazy-E a piece of paper that contained Eazy's mother's address, telling him, "I know where your mama stays." Eazy-E finally signed Dr. Dre and The D.O.C.'s releases, officially ending N.W.A. In his book, Heller corroborates the movie's assertion that Eazy-E wanted to retaliate by killing Knight. He also claims that Knight wanted three Ruthless artists—Dre, D.O.C., and Dre's girlfriend Michel'le (whom Knight later married)—released from their contracts so they could sign with Knight and Sony. A lawsuit against Dre, Knight, and Sony was later settled out of court.
- Dre witnesses Knight and his gangbanger buddies intimidating a man in his underwear with a dog in the Death Row Records offices, then leaves in protest and leads cops on a dramatic high-speed chase that ends with his arrest. Dre told The Hollywood Reporter that the scene really happened: "I was like, 'What the f— is going on?' I was ready to leave anyways. This was the extra push. The guy in the underwear? All this shit actually happened." Dre was sentenced to eight months in prison for drunk-driving his Ferrari through Beverly Hills in the late-night, 90-mph chase.
- There are no reports of Eazy going through foreclosure or having financial issues towards the end of his life. Phyllis Pollack, who worked extensively with Eazy, estimated that he died with $30 million in the bank. B.G. Knocc Out called the depiction "bullshit", noting that Eazy had major acts like Bone Thugs-n-Harmony under contract.
- In the film, Eazy is visited in the hospital by Dr. Dre. Ice Cube arrives to see him too, but cannot bring himself to enter Eazy's room. In real life, DJ Yella remained close to Eazy throughout the post-N.W.A breakup. Yella was also the only member of N.W.A to attend Eazy's funeral.
- In the film, Cube and his new group Da Lench Mob are suddenly attacked by unidentified assailants. In reality, Cube's dispute was with Above the Law. He and their rapper/producer Cold 187um had already fought at an Anaheim show earlier that year, and Cube brought along Da Lench Mob partly as protection. Shorty from Da Lench Mob threw the first blow. It was a wild showdown, with tables flying and shiners administered. But, Cube wasn't involved. When it began, he was speaking on a panel.
- Towards the movie's end, Eazy asks Cube about reuniting N.W.A.. Cube says he is down if Jerry Heller is not involved, and Eazy fires the manager shortly after. Eazy then brings the reunion idea to Dre, who is 100% on board. In reality, Eazy and Cube did speak of an N.W.A. reunion not long before Eazy was diagnosed with AIDS. But, Dre had not committed to it. In fact, Cold 187um says he was not planning on producing any new N.W.A. tracks.

=== Reactions from the depicted ===
On June 10, 2015, MC Ren took to Twitter to voice his displeasure at the lack of exposure his character had in the Straight Outta Compton trailer, saying "Man fuck these bitches at universal pictures leaving me out the movie trailers tryin [sic] to rewrite history" and "When you have bitches work on a hip hop film that don't know shit about hip hop this is what happens. How the hell u [sic] leave me out after all the work I put into them records." After the film's release, Ren tweeted, "True fans know my role in the group as far as lyrics are concerned, don't let the movie fool you about my contribution to the group." He later praised the filmmakers saying, "Congrats to the cast and crew. Great job of telling our story."

Despite being a founding member, Arabian Prince's contribution to the group has been ignored in the movie, and his character has a brief, uncredited cameo in the film when the album cover for Straight Outta Compton is shown momentarily. While going on record that he personally harbored no ill will towards the producers, Arabian Prince did note that it led to numerous inquiries and interview requests as to the possible reasons for such a revisionist approach. According to Arabian Prince, "Maybe for 50% of the [movie] scenes, I was there in real life, on stage, or in the studio. A lot of N.W.A's early music production was done with my equipment." Initially, Brandon Lafourche was cast in the role of Arabian Prince. Despite appearing in early photoshoots, the character was cut from the film. Gray explained that "It felt like a mistake to focus on someone who wasn't in the group for that long. It was a challenge to narrow ten years down into two hours."

On August 24, 2015, DJ Alonzo Williams referred to the film as "a great fusion of fantasy and reality", after admitting that he enjoyed the film. He disputed the accuracy of the scenes where he forbade gangsta rap from being played at his club, saying that the members of N.W.A had not started gangsta rap at that point. He also commented on the scene when Dr. Dre was bailed out of jail by Eazy-E, saying that Dr. Dre had been jailed several times for non-payment of parking fees and that he had an argument with Dre after having bailed him out of jail numerous times. When Alonzo refused to bail Dre out another time, Eazy-E bailed him out instead. Alonzo claimed that it was he who introduced Eazy-E to Jerry Heller and that contrary to how it was depicted in the movie, he was supportive of Boyz-n-the-Hood, unlike most others at the time.

=== Lawsuit from Heller ===
On October 30, 2015, Heller filed a 12-claim lawsuit in the Superior Court of Los Angeles against NBCUniversal, director F. Gary Gray, Legendary Pictures, the screenwriters of the film, Ice Cube, Dr. Dre and the estate of Eazy-E. As well as protesting his depiction in the film, Heller claimed that a significant amount of the film's content had been taken from his autobiography without permission. The defendants countered with a request that Heller's defamation charges be dismissed. In December 2018, two years after Heller's death, a judge dismissed the lawsuit.

=== Omissions ===
On August 17, 2015, Michel'le, Dr. Dre's former girlfriend and mother of one of his children, did an exclusive interview with Vlad TV. In the interview, the former Ruthless and Death Row Records artist ponders her and Dre's abusive relationship and she states that she was aware she was not included in the Straight Outta Compton film. "Why would Dre put me in it? I mean 'cause if they start from where they start from I was just a quiet girlfriend who got beat up and told to shut up."

On August 18, 2015, Gawker published an editorial by Dee Barnes titled "Here's What's Missing from Straight Outta Compton: Me and the Other Women Dr. Dre Beat Up." Barnes notes that Dr. Dre had repeated instances of physical abuse to female associates during his time in N.W.A, including the infamous January 1991 beating of Barnes in the bathroom of Po Na Na Souk nightclub. In the film, these incidents were never acknowledged. She further notes that important women from the era with close and historically important ties to N.W.A (J. J. Fad, Yo Yo, Tairrie B, etc.) were absent from the film. In the end, most women portrayed in the film are partying groupies, and Barnes felt that it could have also acknowledged the female MCs who contributed to N.W.A's and individual members' successes.

Gerrick D. Kennedy of the Los Angeles Times revealed the Barnes incident was originally included in an earlier version of the film's script. On August 21, 2015, Dr. Dre responded, apologizing to "the women I've hurt. I deeply regret what I did and know that it has forever impacted all of our lives." The next day, Apple Inc., which bought Beats Electronics for $3 billion in 2014 from Dr. Dre and made him an executive, weighed in on the abuse allegations to offer their support to Dre. The company said in a statement, "Dre has apologized for the mistakes he's made in the past and he's said that he's not the same person that he was 25 years ago."

On August 26, 2015, Randall Roberts of the Los Angeles Times criticized the film for leaving out the story of the all-female rap group J. J. Fad and how some in the media claim the group was responsible for "forging a path for the breakout success of N.W.A".

Dr. Dre and Snoop Dogg dissing Eazy-E in "Dre Day", Eazy-E's retaliation "Real Muthaphuckkin G's" and its guest rappers Dresta and B.G. Knocc Out are never portrayed in the film.

== Music ==
=== Compton ===
On August 7, 2015, Dr. Dre released the album Compton: A Soundtrack by Dr. Dre exclusively on Apple Music and the iTunes Store at first and later released on other digital music platforms and in CD and vinyl form. Though not an official soundtrack to the film Straight Outta Compton, Dr. Dre said this album would be "inspired by the movie". Dre said on The Pharmacy (his Beats 1 radio show) that during principal photography of Straight Outta Compton, "I felt myself going to the studio and being so inspired by the movie that I started recording an album." He added, "It's an 'inspired by' album. It's inspired by Straight Outta Compton."

Part of Straight Outta Compton's successful opening has been attributed to Compton: A Soundtrack, Dr. Dre's first collection of original music since his 1999's 2001 album, which was released a week prior to the film's premiere and debuted at No. 2 on the US Billboard 200 charts and No. 1 on the iTunes charts. Dr. Dre said he would donate royalties from his album to the city of Compton for a new performing arts facility.

=== Soundtrack ===
An official soundtrack album to the film entitled Straight Outta Compton: Music from the Motion Picture was released on January 8, 2016, by Universal Music Enterprises. It features songs mainly by N.W.A, but also has songs by Ice Cube, Eazy-E, Dr. Dre featuring Snoop Dogg, and others.

== See also ==
- List of black films of the 2010s
- List of films that most frequently use the word fuck
- List of hood films
- The Defiant Ones, topic-related 2017 documentary
