= Alan Wenkus =

American screenwriter and film producer

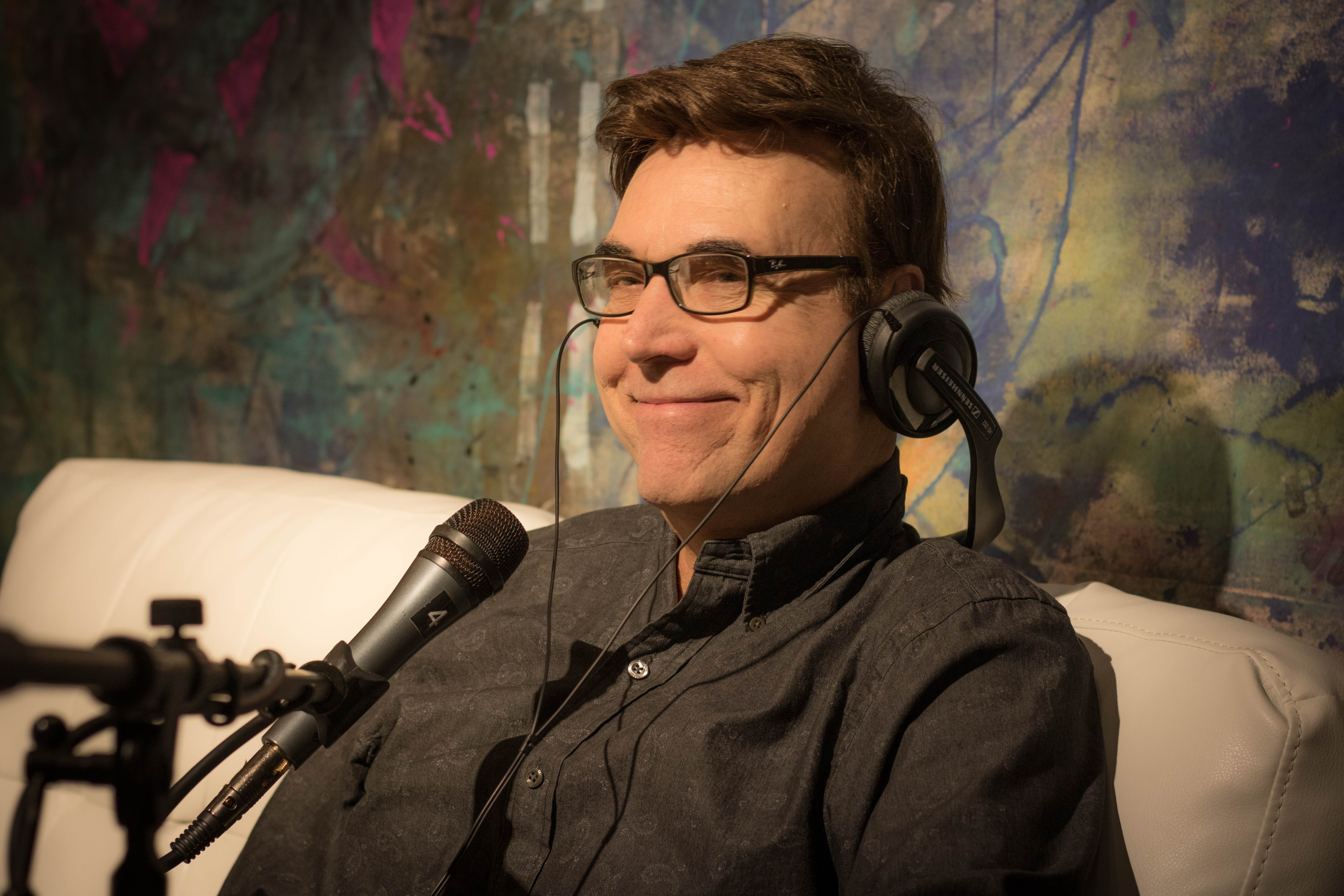
Wenkus in 2017

Alan Wenkus is an American screenwriter, film producer, director and a former VP of programming for Premiere Networks. Wenkus has been nominated for several awards for his work in television and film including a Writers Guild of America Award, the NAACP Image Award and an Academy Award for Best Original Screenplay. He's best known for co-writing and Executive Producing Straight Outta Compton.

== Radio career ==
Wenkus got his start in radio out of college. While performing stand-up comedy, he was hired to work on the Hot 97 Morning Show in New York City. He wrote for the show and performed a variety of on-air characters while also helping to create nationally syndicated comedy services that included "Radio Hotline" and "The Daily Comedy Exclusive." He launched the comedy and prep radio services at Premiere Radio Networks and worked with hundreds of morning radio shows across the country helping them to stay topical and entertaining.

== Television career ==
Wenkus was a writer and segment producer for The Tonight Show With Jay Leno from 1998 to 2008 contributing skits and jokes for the nightly monologue. In January 2017 it was announced Wenkus was writing and executive producing the new hip-hop gangland TV miniseries Haitian Jack produced by Radar Pictures and Interscope Records co-founder Ted Field and directed by "All Eyez on Me" director Benny Boom. Wenkus also created and Executive Produced the ABC event series Cola Wars with Lionsgate Television. In 2021 Wenkus and his company Handstamp Studios partnered with Shark Tank’s Daymond John to create a scripted series about the launch of John’s iconic apparel brand FUBU.

== Screenwriting credits ==
Wenkus is known as a researcher and producer. Among his screen credits, Wenkus co-wrote and co-executive produced Universal's Straight Outta Compton, the N.W.A biopic directed by F. Gary Gray. Wenkus has also written several other screenplays in development including a remake of the film, Dolemite, and recently researched and wrote the screenplay, Teddy Ballgame, about the life of Boston Red Sox slugger and war hero Ted Williams. His upcoming projects include the authorized John Fogerty Creedence Clearwater Revival biopic Fortunate Son.

As an uncredited “script doctor”, Wenkus has done rewrites and polishes on several studio film projects. He also co-wrote the screenplay Private Resort for Johnny Depp. The film also stars actor Rob Morrow and Andrew Dice Clay.

On May 13, 2015, it was announced at the Cannes Film Festival that Wenkus was writing and producing the big screen biopic, No Show Jones, about country music legend George Jones.

In September 2015, Wenkus signed a deal to write the screenplay to the New York Times bestseller, Code Name: Johnny Walker. The book was co-written by American Sniper author Jim DeFelice.

In January 2016, Wenkus was nominated for a Writers Guild of America Award for Best Original Screenplay and an Academy Award for Best Original Screenplay as part of the screenwriting team that wrote Straight Outta Compton.
