= Hammacher Schlemmer =

American retailer founded in 1848

Coordinates: 40°45′39″N 73°58′7″W

Hammacher Schlemmer & Co. Inc.
- Type: Private
- Industry: Retail
- Founded: 1848
- Founder: Charles Tollner
- Fate: Acquired by S5 Equity
- Headquarters: Niles, Illinois, United States
- Website: hammacher.com

Hammacher Schlemmer (/ˈhæməkər ˈʃlɛmər/) is an American retailer and catalog company based in Niles, Illinois. A going-out-of-business sale was initiated in October 2025, and its brand was relaunched under management of event-driven retail company Stores.com (formerly Mercatalyst and Meh) in March 2026.

== History ==
Hammacher Schlemmer began as a hardware store specializing in hard-to-find tools in the Bowery district of New York City in 1848. Owned by proprietors Charles Tollner and Mr. R. Stern, it became one of the first national hardware stores. A few months later, Stern withdrew and Tollner continued the business until 1859, moving in 1857 to 209 Bowery. In 1859, family friend Albert Hammacher invested $5,000 in the company and the name was changed to C. Tollner and A. Hammacher.

Early in the Civil War, a severe coin shortage in New York City made it nearly impossible for retailers to make change for their customers. In response to this shortage, the United States government allowed merchants to mint their own coins, known as "rebellion tokens" or "copperheads". The store, at that point called Hammacher & Tollner, began distributing its own copper coins until the government ordered Hammacher & Tollner to cease.

During the 1860s, William Schlemmer, Tollner's nephew by marriage, gradually bought out his stake in the company. When Tollner died in 1867, 26-year-old Schlemmer entered into a partnership with Hammacher and Peter F. Taaks. As a result, the company changed its name to Hammacher & Co. William Schlemmer had been actively involved with the business since 1853, when he had moved to New York City from Germany at age twelve and worked at the storefront. After a few years, Taaks resigned. Because Schlemmer owned a greater portion of the company, the name was changed in 1883 to the present style of Hammacher Schlemmer & Co.

Hammacher Schlemmer was among the first companies to install a telephone in their store, as well as one of the original subscribers to the Bell Telephone Company Directory. Hammacher Schlemmer was also the first retailer to offer a number of products, such as the "Tourist Autokit," the pop-up toaster (1930), the electric toothbrush (1955), and the telephone answering machine (1968), in the United States.

Hammacher Schlemmer began printing and distributing a company catalog in 1881. In 1912, it printed its largest catalog to date, spanning 1,112 pages. A hardbound copy of the 1912 catalog is housed in the Smithsonian’s permanent collection. By 1926, Hammacher Schlemmer had moved uptown to a larger space at the company's present location of East 57th Street.

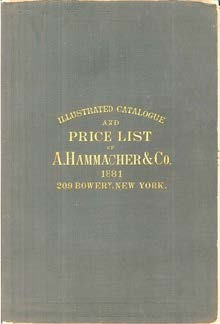
The First Printed Catalog, 1881

Hammacher resigned in 1892, leaving the whole company to Schlemmer serving as the President and Treasurer and his son William F. Schlemmer, to be named Vice President several years later.

Hammacher Schlemmer began prominently featuring new inventions in their catalog in the 1930s, beginning with the first pop-up toaster and portable radio in 1930. Other products included outdoor grills, several different types of coffee makers and rhinestone dog collars. In 1945, William F. Schlemmer died at the age of 67, leaving his wife, Else, in charge of the company. In 1948, Hammacher Schlemmer celebrated its 100-year anniversary with the introduction of the first automatic steam iron and the electric broom. Else did not have any children, and in 1952 she executed a will naming more than 100 Hammacher Schlemmer employees as beneficiaries. She died in 1955, leaving an estate worth approximately $473,000.

After more than 100 years as a family-held business, Hammacher Schlemmer was sold in 1953 to a group of investors and eventually turned over to John Gerald. In 1960, Gerald sold Hammacher Schlemmer to the Kayser-Roth Corporation. During the 1960s, Hammacher Schlemmer began selling the first Home Bowling Alley, London Taxi Cabs, and a "Nothing Box."

Dominic Tampone, who joined the company as a stock boy at age 15, was named President of Hammacher Schlemmer in 1962. Tampone created a wholesale division, Invento Products Corporation, as a subsidiary for invention and product development. Invento evolved into a clearinghouse for novel products, sourcing items from around the world and selling them under its own brand to retailers including Hammacher Schlemmer, Sears, and Neiman Marcus, generating annual sales of nearly $2.5 million.

Tampone held leadership position at Hammacher Schlemmer through two changes in corporate ownership—a 1975 sale to Conglomerate Gulf + Western Industries, Inc. in 1975, and a subsequent sale to John Roderick MacArthur's Bradford Exchange Ltd. Inc. in 1980. Tampone died in 1982 as Vice-President.

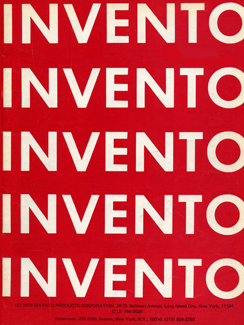
Invento Products Corporation

In 1983, J. Roderick MacArthur created the Hammacher Schlemmer Institute as an independent but affiliated branch of the company, whose purpose is to comparatively test leading products. On December 15, 1984, MacArthur died and left the company to his heirs. By 2014, they sold Hammacher Schlemmer to the company's employees.

In 1988, Hammacher Schlemmer became one of the first retailers to sell products over the Internet with CompuServe, the first major commercial online service in the United States. From 1991 to 2001, Hammacher Schlemmer offered products through SkyMall, a specialty catalog that was available in the seat back pocket of many airline until the company's bankruptcy in 2015. In 1995, America Online built Hammacher Schlemmer a store on the Internet.

By 1998, Hammacher Schlemmer launched their own website, Hammacher.com. That same year, Hammacher Schlemmer celebrated its 150th anniversary. As a tribute, Mayor Rudolph Giuliani renamed the block on 57th Street between Lexington and 3rd Avenue as Hammacher Schlemmer Way.

== Retail stores ==
Hammacher Schlemmer first began as a hardware store at 221 The Bowery, where it remained from 1848 to 1859. It later moved to 209 The Bowery, remaining from 1859 to 1904. The yellow fever plague of 1822, ascribed to impure water, desolated lower Manhattan and caused business and terrified inhabitants to move out of town to Greenwich Village. As there was no individual water supply, water was furnished by numerous wells with pumps – some in the middle of Broadway. "Choice" water was carted around in large casks by hucksters. At last an extensive "reservoir" was planned, and in 1836, a well one hundred and twelve feet deep and sixteen feet in diameter distributed water through twenty-five miles of mains to two thousand homes. It was located on 13th Street & Fourth Avenue, where Hammacher Schlemmer resided from 1904 to 1926.

From there, the company moved into its present location at 147 East 57th Street, in 1926. Located on the site of the Huntington Stables and near Park Avenue, the modern twelve-story building has housed hardware, gifts, housewares, bath, dressing room and closet furnishings, kitchen and fireplace equipment, furniture and a variety of categories of consumer products.

In the 1980s, two additional stores were added to Hammacher Schlemmer, one in Chicago (1984), and one in Beverly Hills, California (1986). With the web-based side of Hammacher becoming such a productive aspect of the company - with online sales increasing at a rate of 30% each year - both the Chicago and Beverly Hills stores closed their doors in 2005, leaving only the landmark store in New York City. In November 2013, Hammacher Schlemmer celebrated its 165th anniversary by unveiling a completely new interior at its landmark Manhattan store. Built in 1926, this reimagined space displayed their collection of the Best, the Only and the Unexpected in open, brightly lit showcases. A selection of exhibits - including a killer whale submarine and a hovercraft - were suspended from the ceiling. In 1999, the company added a store at The Shops at Sunset Place in South Miami, Florida. It later closed.

In January 2023, Hammacher Schlemmer announced that after 96 years, they would not renew their lease and would close their 57th Street location.

== In popular culture ==
The New York store was featured in a scene from the movie Joe Versus the Volcano (1990), during which the title character played by Tom Hanks visits the store to be outfitted for an exotic trip.

Comedic reference is made to the store in Chris Elliott and Bob Elliott’s 1989 book, Daddy’s Boy: A Son’s Shocking Account of Life with a Famous Father. In a fanciful account of a transatlantic voyage with his father on the Andrea Doria, Chris Elliott lists among an assortment of oddball luggage items, "a two-man submarine from Hammacher Schlemmer, complete with forty-amp thrusters and an air-supply system capable of maintaining up to one hundred cubic feet of oxygen."

In the 2006 film Beerfest, the two muscle-bound characters of the German Drinking Team are named Hammacher and Schlemmer (played by Ralf Moeller and Günter Schlierkamp, respectively).

A Hammacher Schlemmer advertisement appears as part of a job applicant's portfolio in the episode "Tea Leaves", during the fifth season of Mad Men.

== Catalogs ==
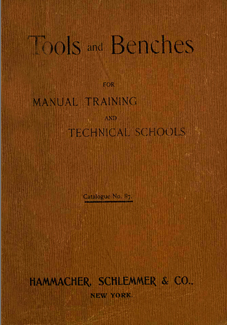
The U.S. Navy used Hammacher Schlemmer as an equipment manual for over 65 years.

In 1881, Hammacher Schlemmer produced its first illustrated catalogue and price list which showcased products with the same care received as in the mahogany cases of the New York store. Intricate pen and ink drawings became the hallmark of Hammacher Schlemmer's hardware catalogs.

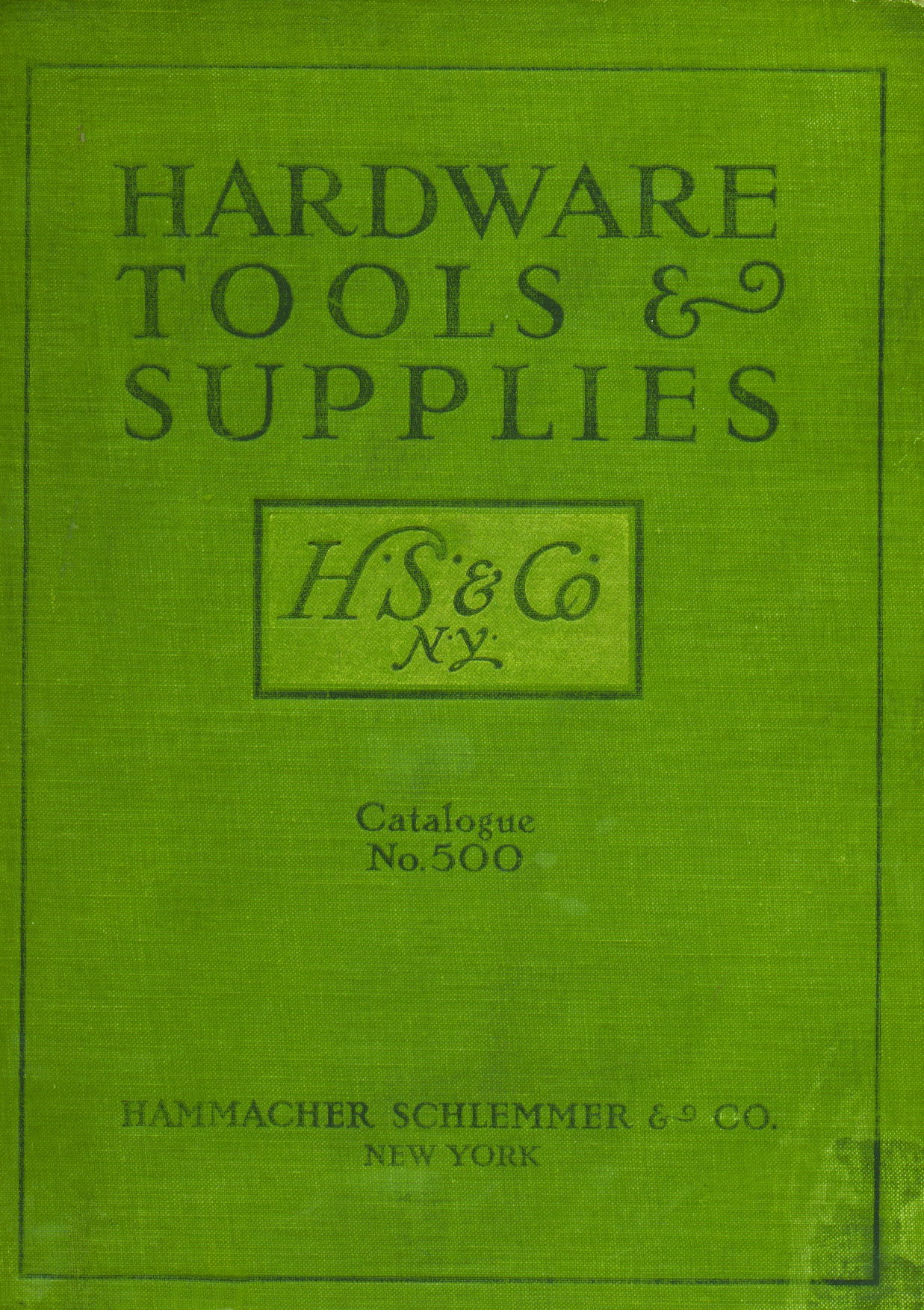
Largest Printed Catalog To Date, 1912

Hammacher Schlemmer published a 400-page catalog featuring tools for all trades in 1896. In keeping with its reputation for high quality and wide selection, the opening page stated, "Our tools are selected with great care and are of the best makes, and meritorious novelties will be, from time to time, added to our present line, our aim being to carry a complete stock of first-class tools."

The U.S. Navy began using the company's catalog as an equipment manual in 1904, continued until 1971.

In 1912, Hammacher Schlemmer printed its largest catalog to-date. Spanning 1,112 pages and taking a total of four years to compile, the catalog confirmed Hammacher as the most complete hardware source on the East Coast. One hardbound edition remains housed in the Smithsonian's permanent collection.

Hammacher Schlemmer published a 32-page brochure in 1923 to commemorate its 75th anniversary. Documenting the company's growth, as well as the corresponding expansion of New York City and the United States, the text closed with this inspiring quote by American author (and son of patriot Nathan Hale) Edward Everett Hale: "Look up-not down, Look out-not in, And lend a hand."

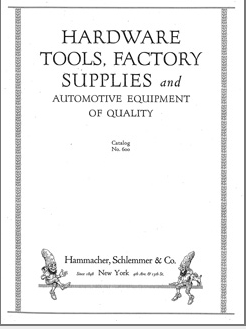
Hammacher Schlemmer launched their "gnome" campaign in 1920.

Hammacher Schlemmer began its "gnome" campaign in 1920 - an ad campaign that featured diligent little cartoon characters in the pages of its catalogs.

In 1931, Hammacher Schlemmer debuted its housewares supplement, the first catalog of its kind in the country, with a brightly colored, yet simply titled cover. These catalogs signaled a new era in its history as the old image of hardware and tools began to fade.

Hammacher Schlemmer's 125th anniversary edition in 1973 featured an assortment of unique kitchen and entertaining products from a "provision cabinet" with clear plastic containers to a gourmet serving cart with an integrated wine rack. The signature gnomes within the catalog pages were replaced with tin man figurines. In a full-page letter on the opening spread, it reaffirmed its commitment to customer service, pledging to continue "loyal, dedicated, trained: bent upon serving you. Now as in 1848, things are on the move. We are in busy-ness now as we were 125 years ago, under our policy: COMPLETE SATISTACTION GUARANTEED."

In 1977, Hammacher Schlemmer printed its first full-color product catalog with a cover flanked by the ever-present gnomes.

Their 1983 Fall Catalog is the first to include ratings from the newly established Hammacher Schlemmer Institute. Using an "enstar" rating system (a blue seven-point star) products were awarded one, two, or three enstars depending on The Institute's evaluation. One Enstar designated a "Unique" product which not only effectively performed the task for which it was designed but does so in a markedly unique manner; two Enstars meant "Best of Kind", a product identified as the best performing in some specialized class within its overall category;three Enstars distinguished a product as "Best Overall" without qualification.

In 1998, the Bertazzon Venetian Carousel, a full-sized fully functional carousel that seated twenty graced the cover of Hammacher Schlemmer's 150th-anniversary catalog. Evoking the charm of 18th-century Venice, this carousel offered an Old World design complete with hand-rendered scenes of Venetian landmarks. Its six jumping horses, five rocking horses, and two chariots were all hand painted and the revolving platform is varnished, solid hardwood. Because each carousel was hand-built to order, it required five months for construction.

In a departure from its traditional cover presentation, the 2003 Holiday Preview catalog featured a cartoon that playfully acknowledged the retailer's reputation for offering unusual, and-on occasion-outlandish items.

In 2014, Hammacher Schlemmer introduced the first Augmented Reality Catalog, a new way to experience its products. Users had to scan specially marked catalog pages with their iPad to overlay a three-dimensional image of a product, spin the item 360 degrees, play videos, and more.
