= The Gnomes' Great Adventure =

1987 film by Harvey Weinstein

- DVD cover
- Spanish: La gran aventura de los gnomos
- Based on: The World of David the Gnome
- Produced by: Claudio Biern Boyd
- Production company: BRB Internacional
- Release date: 1987
- Running time: 75 minutes (1987 release); 90 minutes (1995 release)
- Country: Spain
- Language: Spanish

The Gnomes' Great Adventure (La gran aventura de los gnomos) is a Spanish animated film. It was produced by BRB Internacional by re-editing together four episodes of its television series The World of David the Gnome. The film follows the life and adventures of the gnomes as they struggle to outwit enemy trolls.

Two English-language dubs of the film exist, one produced by Miramax in 1987 with the original series' English dub cast and a few celebrity voices, and another produced in 1995 in the United Kingdom. Harvey Weinstein is credited as the director of the first English dub, first released in 1988. Despite the film's obscurity, some well known actors contributed to it, including Tom Bosley, Christopher Plummer, Bob Elliott, Ray Goulding, and Frank Gorshin. The British English soundtrack to the film was rerecorded in 1995 by the London-based company Village Productions, Ltd. with an entirely different voice cast.

== Cast ==
Character	Spanish	1987 American dub	1995 British dub
David	José María Cordero	Tom Bosley	Stuart Organ
Lisa	Matilde Conesa	Jane Woods	Claire Woyka
Holler	Paco Hernández	Frank Gorshin	Stephen Bent
Swift	Ramón Langa	Vlasta Vrána	Steve Edwin
Pit	José Moratalla	Adrian Knight	Gavin Muir
Pat	Ángel Egido	Rob Roy	Stephen Bent

=== Additional voices ===
- Spanish: Manuel Peiró (Pot), Teófilo Martínez (Narrator)
- 1987 American dub: Marc Denis (Pot), Christopher Plummer (Narrator, Old Man), Bob Elliott (Fred), Ray Goulding (Ed), Frank Gorshin (Carlo, Omar, Prince), Tony Randall (Gnome King, Ghost of the Black Lake), Richard Dumont (King)
- 1995 British dub: Gavin Muir (Old Man, King), Juliet Prague (Tom), Regina Reagan (Susan, Twinkle), John Vernon (Omar, Master Ghost)

== Crew ==
=== 1987 American English dub ===
- Directed by Harvey Weinstein
- Produced by Bob Weinstein
- Screenplay by Shelly Altman and Mike Zettler
- Edited by Ed Glass
- Executive producer: Claudio Biern Boyd
- Executives in charge of production: Micheline Charest and Ronald A. Weinberg
- Associate producer: Maria Aragon
- Music composed and performed by Bob Jewett and Jack Maeby

=== 1995 British English dub ===
- Music and song by Bill Nabb and Terry Wilson
- Production assistant: Olga Pla
- Production coordinator: Cristina Nicolau
- Post-production: Claudio Biern Lliviria and Ray Hampson
- Production supervisor: Olivia Borricon
- Associate producer: Jose Manuel Iglesias
- Created for television by Claudio Biern Boyd
