= Sarah Winshall =

American film producer

- Occupation: Producer
- Years active: 2019–present

Sarah Winshall is an American film producer. She has produced Strawberry Mansion (2021), We're All Going to the World's Fair (2022), I Saw the TV Glow (2024) and Good One (2024).

== Early life ==
Winshall attended The New School receiving a Master's degree in Media Management, and was a graduate of NYU's Martin Scorsese Department of Cinema Studies.

== Career ==
Apart from producing, Winshall is a film critic, with her work being published in Filmmaker, Screen Slate and Under the Radar.

She is the founder of Smudge Films, a production company, under which she has produced Clara's Ghost by Bridey Elliott, Strawberry Mansion by Albert Birney and Kentucker Audley, Give Me Pity and By Design by Amanda Kramer. We're All Going to the World's Fair and I Saw the TV Glow by Jane Schoenbrun, and Good One by India Donaldson.

In 2024, Winshall alongside Micah Gottlieb co-founded the film festival Los Angeles Festival of Movies.

== Filmography ==
=== Film ===
Year	Film	Credit
2018	Clara's Ghost	
2019	Leave the Bus Through the Broken Window	Co-producer
2021	Strawberry Mansion	
2022	We're All Going to the World's Fair	
2022	Give Me Pity!	
2024	I Saw the TV Glow	
2024	Good One	Executive producer
2024	Dream Team	Executive producer
2025	By Design	
