= Daddy's Boy =

Book by Chris Elliott

Daddy's Boy: A Son's Shocking Account of Life with a Famous Father
- First edition
- Author: Chris Elliott
- Published: 1989 (Dell Publishing)
- Pages: 142 (US hardback)
- ISBN: 0-385-29730-0
- OCLC: 19264804
- Dewey Decimal: 818/.5402 19
- LC Class: PN6162 .E47 1989
- Followed by: The Shroud of the Thwacker

Daddy's Boy: A Son's Shocking Account of Life with a Famous Father is a 1989 book written by American author Chris Elliott, and published by the Dell Publishing in the United States.

== Plot ==
The book is a parody celebrity memoir, fictionalizing the author's childhood experiences as the son of comedian Bob Elliott. The chapters alternate between father and son, with Chris telling his story of growing up with a famous father in one chapter and Bob rebutting it in the next.
