= Madison McKinley =

American actress and producer

Madison McKinley Garton
- Madison McKinley at Fashion Fiesta For A Cause in 2013
- Born: Madison McKinley Garton c. 1986; Vail, Colorado, U.S.
- Education: Vail Mountain School
- Occupations: Actress, Producer, Model
- Years active: 2007–present

Madison McKinley (née Garton; born c. 1986) is an American actress, producer and former model. She played Shelby in the 2017 film Molly's Game, a character based on her own work at the poker games run by Molly Bloom. In 2011 she was a contestant on the fifteenth season of the ABC series The Bachelor. She was an executive producer of the television series Unconventional and the film By Design.

== Early life and education ==
McKinley was born Madison Garton in Vail, Colorado, and attended Vail Mountain School. She worked as a model in Colorado before moving to New York City.

== Career ==
In New York, McKinley worked as an actress and model under her professional name. She appeared in the film Sex and the City (2008) and in episodes of 30 Rock, Rescue Me and Lipstick Jungle. She also appeared in Flight of the Conchords.

In January 2011, McKinley appeared under her birth name as one of 30 contestants on the fifteenth season of The Bachelor, which starred Brad Womack. She wore veneer fangs in the season premiere and was a member of a vampire club in New York. She left the show during the rose ceremony in the third episode, telling Womack that she did not want to take a place from another contestant. She later said that a personal story shared by contestant Emily Maynard contributed to her decision to leave.

=== Film and television ===
McKinley had a small role in The Wolf of Wall Street (2013), credited as Madison McKinley Garton, and appeared in an episode of Orange Is the New Black.

While living in New York, McKinley worked for Molly Bloom at her private poker games for about four years, until a federal investigation ended them. In Molly's Game (2017), Aaron Sorkin's adaptation of Bloom's memoir, the character Shelby was based on McKinley. She provided background information to Sorkin during the writing of the screenplay and auditioned for the role.

In Realms (2017), a horror film directed by Daric Gates and set in Bangkok, McKinley played Jewel, a bank robber. She was second-billed after Ryan Kelley. In 2018 she played the female lead in Fright Fest, a slasher film directed by Ante Novakovic and starring Dylan Walsh. The film premiered at the Arrow Video FrightFest festival in London in August 2018 and was later released as American Fright Fest.

=== Producing ===
McKinley was an executive producer of Unconventional, a comedy series created by Kit Williamson and developed at the Sundance Lab. The series was acquired by the streaming service Revry. She was also an executive producer of By Design, a film written and directed by Amanda Kramer that premiered at the 2025 Sundance Film Festival.

== Filmography ==
=== Film ===
Year	Title	Role	Notes
2008	Sex and the City		
2013	The Wolf of Wall Street	Heidi	Credited as Madison McKinley Garton
2017	Molly's Game	Shelby	
2017	Realms	Jewel	
2018	Fright Fest		Also released as American Fright Fest
2025	By Design		Executive producer

=== Television ===
Year	Title	Notes
2007	30 Rock	Guest role
2009	Rescue Me	Guest role
2009	Lipstick Jungle	Guest role
2009	Flight of the Conchords	Guest role
2011	The Bachelor	Contestant, season 15; as Madison Garton
2015	Orange Is the New Black	1 episode
2025	Unconventional	Executive producer
