= By Design (2025 film) =

2025 American film

- Film poster
- Directed by: Amanda Kramer
- Written by: Amanda Kramer
- Produced by: Miranda Bailey; Sarah Winshall; Jacob Agger; Natalie Whalen
- Starring: Juliette Lewis; Mamoudou Athie; Melanie Griffith; Samantha Mathis; Robin Tunney; Udo Kier
- Cinematography: Patrick Meade Jones
- Edited by: Benjamin Shearn
- Music by: Bryan Scary; Giulio Carmassi
- Production companies: Cold Iron Pictures; Smudge Films
- Distributed by: Music Box Films
- Release dates: January 23, 2025 (Sundance); February 13, 2026 (United States)
- Running time: 91 minutes
- Country: United States
- Language: English
- Box office: $44,307

By Design is a 2025 American drama film written and directed by Amanda Kramer. It stars Juliette Lewis, Mamoudou Athie, Melanie Griffith, Samantha Mathis, Robin Tunney, and Udo Kier.

It premiered at the Sundance Film Festival on January 23, 2025. The film was released in theaters on February 13, 2026.

== Premise ==
A woman swaps bodies with a chair.

== Cast ==
- Juliette Lewis as Camille
- Mamoudou Athie as Olivier
- Melanie Griffith as Narrator
- Samantha Mathis as Lisa
- Robin Tunney as Irene
- Udo Kier as Aldo Fabbri
- Clifton Collins Jr. as Jacob the Stalker
- Betty Buckley as Cynthia
- Alisa Tores as Marta
- Keir Gilchrist as Gary
- Bridey Elliott as Regina
- Sophie von Haselberg as Len
- Miranda Bailey as Diane the Wailing Woman
- Cristo Montt as Gio
- Greer Cohen as Esther
- Jessie-Ann Kohlman as Tara
- Ruby Cruz as Sheila the Intern
- Michelle Farrah as The Journalist
- Jim Chapa as The Art Director
- Cricket Arrison as The Photographer
- Madison McKinley as Sarah the Stockest

== Production ==
In September 2024, it was announced Juliette Lewis, Mamoudou Athie, Samantha Mathis, Robin Tunney, Udo Kier, Clifton Collins Jr. and Betty Buckley had joined the cast of the film, with Amanda Kramer writing and directing. Filming took place in Los Angeles.

== Release ==
It had its world premiere at the Sundance Film Festival on January 23, 2025. In August 2025, Music Box Films acquired distribution rights to the film.

== Reception ==
On the review aggregator website Rotten Tomatoes, 72% of 54 critics' reviews are positive. The website's consensus reads: "Amanda Kramer's delicate creation intellectualizes the absurdity of objectification, yet this film won't sit still in the audience's mind and that's By Design." On Metacritic, the film has a weighted average score of 63 out of 100, based on 13 critics, which the site labels as "generally favorable" reviews.
