= Into Hot Air =

2007 book by Chris Elliott

- First US edition cover
- Author: Chris Elliott
- Publisher: Weinstein Company
- Pages: 352 (US hardback)
- ISBN: 1-60286-007-6
- OCLC: 154694540
- Dewey Decimal: 813/.6 22
- LC Class: PS3605.L4453 I58 2007

Into Hot Air is a 2007 book written by American comedian and author Chris Elliott, and published by the Weinstein Company in the United States.

The book is a parody of celebrity and adventure memoirs. Its title references Jon Krakauer's 1996 Into Thin Air, a memoir of an expedition to climb Mount Everest that resulted in the deaths of eight climbers.
