= Bob and Ray =

American comedy duo

- Ray Goulding and Bob Elliott
- Ray Goulding and Bob Elliott hosting The Name's the Same in 1955

Comedy career
- Years active: 1946–1988
- Medium: Radio
- Genres: Improvisation, satire
- Former members: Bob Elliott (1923–2016); Ray Goulding (1922–1990)

Bob and Ray were an American comedy duo whose career spanned five decades, composed of comedians Bob Elliott and Ray Goulding. The duo's format was typically to satirize the medium in which they were performing, such as conducting radio or television interviews, with off-the-wall dialogue presented in a generally deadpan style as though it were a serious broadcast.

== Radio ==
Elliott and Goulding began as radio announcers (Elliott a disc jockey and Goulding a newscaster) in Boston with their own separate programs on station WHDH, and each would visit with the other while on the air. Their informal banter was so appealing that WHDH would call on them, as a team, to fill in when Red Sox baseball broadcasts were rained out. Elliott and Goulding (not yet known as Bob and Ray) would improvise comedy routines all afternoon, and joke around with studio musicians.

Elliott and Goulding's brand of humor caught on, and WHDH gave them their own weekday show in 1946. Matinee with Bob and Ray was originally a 15-minute show, soon expanding to half an hour. (When explaining why Bob was billed first, Goulding claimed that it was because Matinee with Bob and Ray sounded better than Matinob with Ray and Bob.) Their trademark sign-off was "This is Ray Goulding reminding you to write if you get work"; "Bob Elliott reminding you to hang by your thumbs."

=== Matinee with Bob and Ray ===
Matinee with Bob and Ray was broadcast Monday through Saturday on WHDH. The weekday half-hours were broadcast live; the Saturday shows were usually 25 minutes long and were sometimes recorded in advance. Staff musicians Ken Wilson (organ) and Bill Green (piano) opened each show with a sprightly rendition of "Collegiate".

Fans who are familiar with Bob and Ray's later routines, which were carefully scripted and timed, might be surprised by surviving episodes of Matinee with Bob and Ray. These shows were completely impromptu and always irreverent, demonstrating how very alert and quick-witted Bob and Ray were. They would follow any comic thread for a few minutes, and then just as suddenly abandon it to move on to another topic. If Ray happened to mention a distant city, Bob would solemnly introduce a travelogue and the pair would narrate a mock documentary. A chance remark about a labor-saving device would bring home-economics expert Mary Margaret McGoon (Ray) to the microphone, offering an unlikely recipe or promoting a useless appliance. If an idea ran out of steam, Bob and Ray's cowboy entertainer Tex Blaisdell (voiced by Bob in a laconic drawl) came out of nowhere to plug his latest personal appearance in some tenth-rate theater. Almost all of the incidental characters passing through the studio were named Sturdley, which became a buzzword of the series.

A regular feature of Matinee with Bob and Ray was a soap opera parody, "The Life and Loves of Linda Lovely". Ray would portray Linda, using a soft, breathy falsetto, with Bob portraying her beloved David in a halting, deliberate baritone. Neither Bob nor Ray knew what each story would involve, so each would cue the other and bat the dialogue back and forth as each situation got out of hand. A 1948 broadcast had Linda suddenly interrupting the story to take an urgent phone call, only to have David counter this turn of events by taking his own call; then Linda announced someone at the door and took a third phone call, which David accepted while Linda greeted the guest at the door and took a fourth phone call.

When the show took time out for a recorded commercial, the team would continue in the same vein. A testimonial by actor Basil Rathbone would be followed by Bob and Ray adopting British accents and outlining a mystery. A commercial for a toy dealer would result in Bob immediately introducing a children's story as told by "Uncle Ray". Beginning in October 1948 they satirized a regularly scheduled singing commercial for Mission Bell Wines, which called for an announcer to read the ad copy live between the opening chorus and the closing jingle. Bob and Ray took any number of liberties, singing the copy drunkenly or punctuating the written copy with sarcastic remarks.

Musicians Wilson and Green performed two selections during each show. Bob and Ray often dragged them into the action, with comments about their clothes, their vacation plans, their musicianship, or their work ethic (Ray: "I don't care if you two have Petrillo behind you, you always come in here thinking you own the place."). One episode had Bob and Ray commenting on a Wilson-Green duet and then discussing the many success stories of the Wilson and Green School of Music. These were all voiced by Bob and Ray, all awful musicians, and all named Sturdley.

Although Matinee with Bob and Ray did not have a studio audience, local residents (often high-school and college students) dropped by the studio daily to watch Bob and Ray. The team's wilder flights of fancy would elicit laughter off-mike.

=== Other radio projects ===
Matinee with Bob and Ray became a favorite with listeners in New England, which brought Elliott and Goulding to the attention of NBC in New York. They continued on the air for over four decades on the NBC, CBS, and Mutual networks, and on New York City stations WINS, WOR, and WHN. From 1973 to 1976, they were the afternoon drive hosts on WOR, doing a four-hour show. In their last incarnation, they were heard on National Public Radio, ending in 1987.

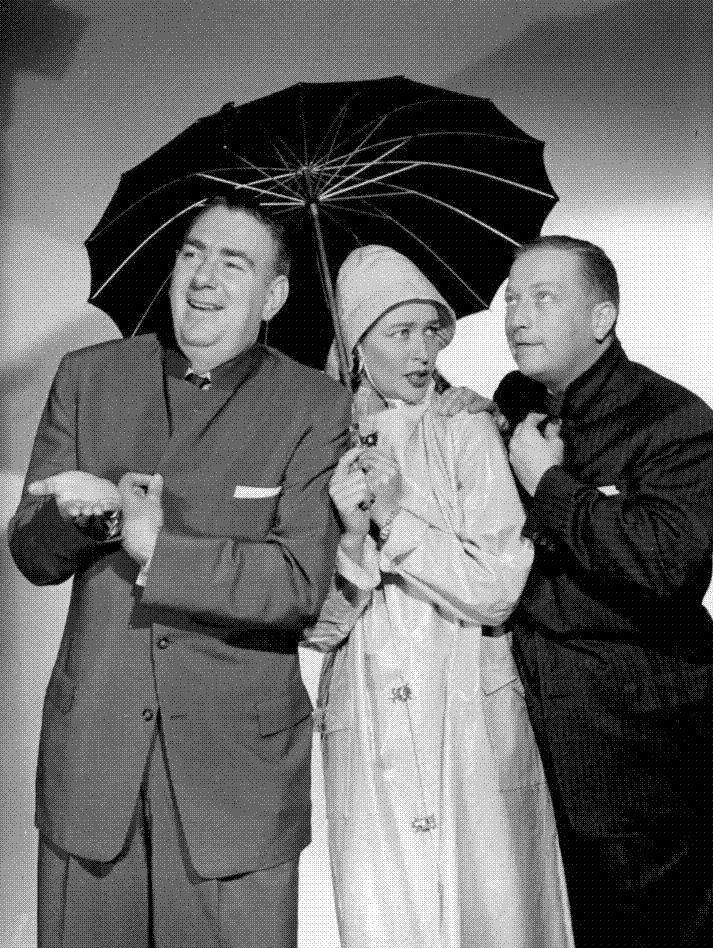
Monitor publicity shot of Bob and Ray with Miss Monitor (Tedi Thurman). All three made extended stays at the NBC studios in order to do hourly live appearances throughout the weekend on Monitor, which could explain why they were grouped for this promotional photo.

They were regulars on NBC's Monitor, often on standby to go on the air at short notice if the program's planned segments developed problems, and they were also heard in a surprising variety of formats and time slots, from a 15-minute series in mid-afternoon to their hourlong show aired weeknights just before midnight in 1954–55. During that same period, they did an audience-participation game show, Pick and Play with Bob and Ray, which was short-lived. It came at a time when network pages filled seats for radio-TV shows by giving tickets to anyone in the street, and on Pick and Play the two comics were occasionally booed by audience members unfamiliar with the Bob and Ray comedy style.

Some of their radio episodes were released on recordings, and others were adapted into graphic story form for publication in MAD magazine. Their earlier shows were mostly ad-libbed, but later programs relied more heavily on scripts. While Bob and Ray created and improvised much of their material, they did accept sketches from writers. The first was Boston broadcaster Jack Beauvais, who had performed as a singer for WEEI in Boston during the 1930s and also worked for some of the big bands in the 1940s and 1950s. The pioneering radio humorist Raymond Knight was a fan, and submitted ideas and sketches. (Bob Elliott later married Knight's widow.)

The most prolific freelance author was Tom Koch (pronounced "Cook"). In 1955 he was a staff writer for Monitor, and he sent Elliott and Goulding 10 bits. "They bought eight," recalled Koch, "so I sent them 10 more and they never did reject another one." Koch always submitted his work by interoffice or postal mail, and although Elliott and Goulding spoke with him in person occasionally, the working relationship was remote: "The check would come and that would be it." Koch captured the Bob and Ray style so well that the team would recite from his scripts verbatim. Koch remained with Elliott and Goulding, off and on, for three decades.

== Characters and spoofs ==
=== Characters ===
Elliott and Goulding lent their voices to a variety of recurring characters and countless one-shots, creating a multilayered world that parodied the real-life world of radio broadcasting. Elliott and Goulding played "Bob" and "Ray", the hosts of an ostensibly serious radio program. Their "staff" (all voiced by Elliott and Goulding) was a comic menagerie of reporters, book reviewers, actors, and all other manner of radio personalities, all of whom interacted with "Bob" and "Ray", as well as with one another. Almost all of these characters had picturesque names, as in one sketch where Bob introduced Ray as one Maitland Q. Montmorency. The guest replied, "My name is John W. Norvis. I have terrible handwriting."

Recurring characters played by Bob Elliott included:

- Wally Ballou, an inept news reporter, man-on-the-street interviewer, "and winner of 16 diction awards", whose opening transmission almost invariably begins with an "up-cut" with him starting early, before his microphone was live, as in "–ly Ballou here". In one of his broadcasts, he was discovered to have started early on purpose and was chewed out by the location engineer (Ray) for making it look as though the mistake was his.
- Snappy sportscaster Biff Burns ("So until next time, this is Biff Burns saying until next time, this is Biff Burns saying goodnight.")
- Johnny Braddock, another sportscaster, but with an obnoxious streak.
- Tex Blaisdell, a drawling cowboy singer who also did rope tricks on the radio (not to be confused with the real-life comic book artist and editor).
- Arthur Sturdley, an Arthur Godfrey take-off.
- Harry Backstayge, handsome stage actor and "idol to a million other women" (in the team's parody of radio's Backstage Wife).
- Pop Beloved, elderly stagehand in the Backstayge stories.
- Kent Lyle Birdley, a wheezing, stammering old-time radio announcer.
- Fred Falvy, "do-it-yourself" handyman, whose projects were usually absurdly expensive and/or utterly impractical – and occasionally illegal.
- One of the McBeeBee twins, either Claude or Clyde, were non-identical twins who spoke in unison, led by Goulding with Elliott a syllable or two behind him, and always interviewed by Elliott.
- Cyril Gore, a Boris Karloff sound-alike, he often appeared as a butler or doorman; his catchphrase was "Follow me down this cor-ree-dor."
- Peter Gorey, a character similar to Gore, but with a Peter Lorre-type voice, he would typically appear as a news reporter, reading the same gruesome stories ("Three men were run over by a steamroller today...") each time he appeared. Bob and Ray also occasionally played a record of "Music! Music! Music!", ostensibly sung by Gorey.
- Mr. Science, a gruff-voiced parody of Mr. Wizard, who dazzled Little Jimmy Schwab with his rather mundane scientific experiments (which usually ended in disaster).
- Todd, friend of Matt Neffer, Boy Spotwelder. The Matt Neffer episodes would involve Todd trying to have a conversation with Matt about something extremely mundane, but Matt kept moving from room to room mid-sentence ("I'm over here, Todd, in the arboretum") This could be stretched out for several minutes as Goulding tried to trip up Elliott and/or the sound-effects person, who had to improvise footsteps and other noises as Matt gave Todd increasingly strange directions: "No, you've gone past it, Todd -- try turning left at the sewing room, then straight ahead through the aviary."

Any script calling for a child's voice usually went to Elliott.

Ray Goulding's roster of characters included:

- Mary Backstayge, wife of Harry Backstayge.
- Webley Webster, mumble-mouthed book reviewer and organ player, whose reviews of historical novels and cookbooks were usually dramatized as seafaring melodramas.
- Calvin Hoogavin (using the same Webley voice), a character in the Mary Backstayge stories.
- Steve Bosco, sportscaster (who signed off with "This is Steve Bosco rounding third, and being thrown out at home", parodying Joe Nuxhall's signature sign-off of "the old lefthander rounding third and heading for home").
- Jack Headstrong, the All-American American (satirizing the long-running Jack Armstrong radio series of juvenile adventures). The serious-voiced Jack was always entrusted with an impossible government mission, and had no patience with any of his friends and advisors ("Quiet, Four-Star General! There's no time for that now!").
- Artie Schermerhorn, another inept reporter. Sometimes partnered with Wally Ballou, often competing with him, especially when employed by the Finley Quality Network.
- Farm editor Dean Archer Armstead (his low, slurring delivery was unintelligible and punctuated by the sound of his spittle hitting a cuspidor); his theme music was a scratchy piano-lesson record of "Old MacDonald Had a Farm".
- The other McBeeBee twin, either Clyde or Claude. As mentioned above, Goulding would speak first, usually trying to trip up and break up Elliott.
- Charles the Poet, who recited sappy verse (parodying the lugubrious Chicago late-night broadcaster Franklyn MacCormack and, to a lesser extent, the Ernie Kovacs character Percy Dovetonsils) but could never get through a whole example of his pathetic work without breaking down in laughter.
- Professor Groggins, a would-be space traveler who constructs a rocket ship in his backyard, but never successfully launches it.
- Little Jimmy Schwab, who was breathlessly overwhelmed by Mr. Science's simple experiments ("Gosh all hemlock, Mr. Science, wait 'til I tell the fellas at school I saw a real ladder!") One of the few child characters played by Goulding.
- Recurring characters such as Matt Neffer, Boy Spot-Welder; failed actor Barry Campbell; crack-voiced reporter Arthur Schrank; Lawrence Fechtenberger, Interstellar Officer Candidate; and all female roles.

While originally employing a falsetto, Goulding generally used the same flat voice for all of his women characters, of which perhaps the best-known was Mary Margaret McGoon (satirizing home-economics expert Mary Margaret McBride), who offered bizarre recipes for such entrees as "frozen ginger ale salad" and "mock turkey". In 1949, Goulding, as Mary, recorded "I'd Like to Be a Cow in Switzerland", which soon became a novelty hit and is still occasionally played by the likes of Dr. Demento. Later, the character was known simply as Mary McGoon. Another female character was Natalie Attired, "radio's Song Sayer" who, instead of singing songs, recited their lyrics to a drumbeat accompaniment.

=== Spoofs and parodies ===
Spoofs of other radio programs were another staple, including the continuing soap operas "Mary Backstayge, Noble Wife", "One Fella's Family", and "Aunt Penny's Sunlit Kitchen" (which spoofed Backstage Wife, One Man's Family, and Aunt Jenny's Real Life Stories, respectively). "Mary Backstayge" was serialized for such a long period of time that it became better known to many listeners than the show it lampooned. Another soap opera spoof, "Garish Summit" (which Bob and Ray performed during their stint on National Public Radio in the 1980s), recounts the petty squabbles for power among the wealthy family members who own a lead mine.

They also satirized Mr. Keen, Tracer of Lost Persons with the continuing parody, "Mr. Trace, Keener than Most Persons". Each Mr. Trace sketch began with a simple plot that soon degenerated into total gibberish where the dialogue was concerned ("Mister Treat, Chaser of Lost Persons", "Thanks for the vote of treedle, Pete") and gunplay ("You... You've shot me!... I'm... dead."). Juvenile adventures were given the satiric treatment: Jack Armstrong became "Jack Headstrong", and Tom Corbett, Space Cadet became "Lawrence Fechtenberger, Interstellar Officer Candidate".

The quiz show "Dr. I.Q., the Mental Banker" was parodied as "Dr. O.K., the Sentimental Banker". Whereas the real Dr. I.Q. had several assistants with remote microphones, scattered through the audience to select contestants, Dr. O.K. (Bob) had to make do with a single assistant (Ed Sturdley, played by Ray), who eventually became exhausted from running around the theater. Other continuing parodies (both generic and specific) included game shows ("The 64-Cent Question"), children's shows ("Mr. Science", "Tippy the Wonder Dog", "Matt Neffer, Boy Spot-Welding King of the World"), self-help seminars ("Dr. Joyce Dunstable"), and foreign intrigue ("Elmer W. Litzinger, Spy").

In 1959 Bob and Ray launched a successful network radio series for CBS, broadcast from New York, known colloquially by a shortening of Goulding's wry introduction: Bob & Ray Present the CBS Radio Network. The CBS programming department frequently supplied scripts promoting the network's dramatic and sports shows, but Bob and Ray never read these scripts entirely straight, and would often imitate the character voices heard on these shows. Gunsmoke and Yours Truly, Johnny Dollar were frequent targets, and Johnny Dollar inspired a full-fledged parody, "Ace Willoughby, International Detective". In each installment, Willoughby (Ray, doing a letter-perfect impersonation of Johnny Dollar star Bob Bailey) traveled around the globe in pursuit of crooks, but always gave up when the crooks found him and kept beating him up. Bob and Ray revisited the Ace Willoughby format a decade later in a parody of the TV detective show Mannix. Their version, called "Blimmix", featured a dimwitted detective and whatever thug served as the antagonist, with Blimmix being beaten up at the end of each segment.

In addition to parodies of specific programs and genres, many of Elliott and Goulding's sketches turned on the inherent absurdities of reportage and interviewing. One particularly enduring routine cast Elliott as an expert on the Komodo dragon, and Goulding as the dense reporter whose questions trailed behind the information given. Another featured Elliott as the spokesman for the Slow Talkers of America ("headquarters" in Glens Falls, New York), whose lengthy pauses between words increasingly frustrate Goulding. The pair performed both of these sketches many times.

Their character known as "The Worst Person in the World" (a reference to New York magazine theatre critic John Simon, who gave their stage show a negative review) was, many years later, appropriated by MSNBC host Keith Olbermann.

=== Commercial parodies ===
Commercial parody was a popular forte with Bob and Ray. A typical show would have such "sponsors" as:

- The Monongahela Metal Foundry ("Casting steel ingots with the housewife in mind")
- Einbinder Flypaper ("The brand you've gradually grown to trust over the course of three generations")
- The Auburn Motor Car Company ("Makers of fine automobiles up to, but not including, 1938")
- The United States Post Office ("Makers and distributors of stamps")
- The Croftweiler Industrial Cartel ("Makers of all sorts of stuff, made out of everything")
- Cool Canadian Air ("Packed fresh every day in the Hudson Bay and shipped to your door")
- Grime ("The magic shortening that spreads like lard")
- The United States Mint ("One of the nation's leading producers of genuine U.S. currency")
- Penuche ("With or without nuts, the greatest name in fudge")
- Kretchford Braid and Tassel ("Next time you think of braid or tassel, rush into your neighborhood store and shout, 'Kretchford'!")
- Chocolate Cookies with White Stuff In Between (sponsoring Lawrence Fechtenberger)
- Gerstmeyer's Puppy Kibbles ("The dog food guaranteed to turn any pet into a vicious man-killer"), sponsoring the police-drama spoof Squad Car 119.
- Mushies ("The cereal that gets soggy even without adding milk or cream") sponsored "Tippy the Wonder Dog".
- An unnamed beverage described as "stuff that you pour in a glass and it fizzes up and gets all over your suit and everything".

== Television ==
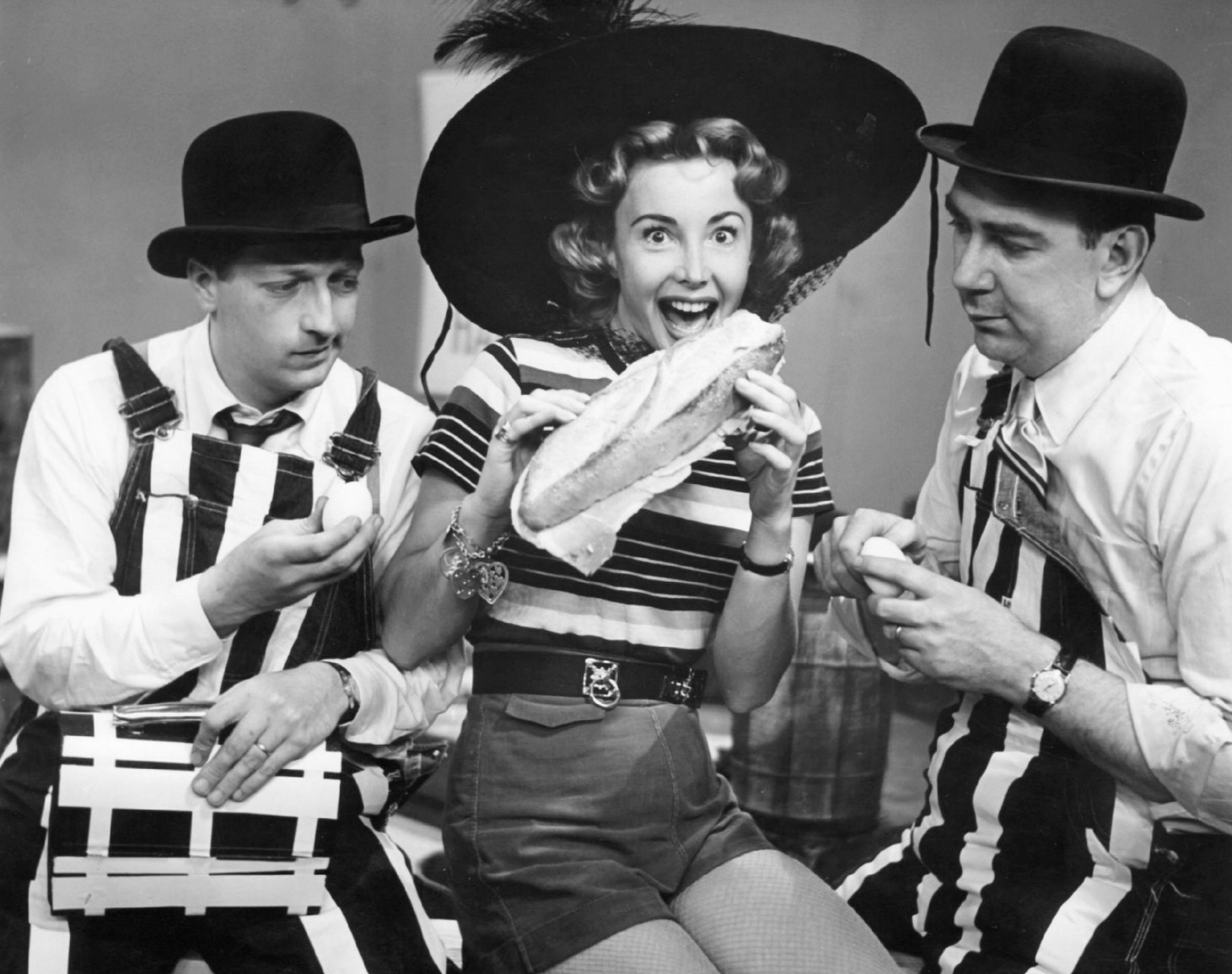
Bob, Audrey Meadows and Ray in a skit on Bob and Ray (NBC, 1951)

In the early 1950s, the two had their own 15-minute television series, entitled simply Bob & Ray. It began November 26, 1951 on NBC with Audrey Meadows as a cast regular. During the second season, the title changed to Club Embassy, and Cloris Leachman joined the cast as a regular, replacing Audrey Meadows, who left the series to join the cast of The Jackie Gleason Show on CBS. In the soap-opera parodies, the actresses took the roles of Mary Backstayge and Linda Lovely. Expanding to a half-hour for the summer of 1952 only, the series continued until September 28, 1953. When The Higgins Boys and Gruber show began on The Comedy Channel in 1989, it occasionally included full episodes of Bob and Ray's 1951–1953 shows (along with episodes of Clutch Cargo and Supercar).

The duo did more television in the latter part of their career, beginning with key roles of Bud Williams Jr. (Elliott) and Walter Gesundheit (Goulding) in Kurt Vonnegut's Hugo-nominated Between Time and Timbuktu: A Space Fantasy (1972), adapted from several Vonnegut novels and stories. (Vonnegut had once submitted comedy material to Bob and Ray.) Fred Barzyk directed this WGBH/PBS production, a science-fiction comedy about an astronaut-poet's journey through the Chrono-Synclastic Infundibulum. This teleplay was first published in an edition that featured numerous screenshots of Bob and Ray and other cast members.

Bob and Ray also hosted a Goodson-Todman game show, The Name's the Same, which was emceed originally by Robert Q. Lewis. Bob and Ray would do a brief comedy routine, and then play the normal game of having a celebrity panel try to guess the contestants' famous names. They would always end the show with their traditional closing: Ray saying, "Write if you get work..." and Bob finishing with "And hang by your thumbs." The rigid format of the game gave the team little room to indulge their humor, and their run as hosts lasted only 10 weeks. In their final broadcast, they omitted the usual "Write if you get work" closing and simply said, "So long." They were replaced the next week by Clifton Fadiman, who finished out the series.

During the late 1950s, Bob and Ray were also on radio and television as the voices of Bert and Harry Piel, two animated characters from a very successful ad campaign for Piels Beer. Since this was a regional beer, the commercials were not seen nationally, but the popularity of the ad campaign resulted in national press coverage. Based on the success of those commercials, they launched a successful advertising voice-over company, Goulding Elliott Graybar (so called because the offices were located in New York's Graybar Building).

In 1971, Bob and Ray lent their voices to the children's television program The Electric Company in a pair of short animated films; in one, explaining opposites, Ray was the "writer of words", first for elevators, then doors, finally faucets. The other, illustrating words ending in -at, had Ray as "Lorenzo the Magnificent" who can read minds and who tries to read a word in Bob's mind, that he thinks is an -at word such as "hat", "bat", "rat", "cat", "mat", etc. (Bob's word is actually "Columbus".)

In 1973, Bob and Ray created an historic television program that was broadcast on two channels: one half of the studio was broadcast on the New York PBS affiliate WNET, and the other half of the studio was broadcast on independent station WNEW. Four sketches were performed, including a tug of war that served as an allegory about nuclear war. The two parts of the program are available for viewing at the Museum of Television & Radio.

In 1979, they returned to national TV for a one-shot NBC special with members of the original Saturday Night Live cast, Bob & Ray, Jane & Laraine & Gilda. It included a skit (not written by Elliott and Goulding) in which the team sat in chairs, in business suits, facing the audience, nearly motionless, and sang a duet of Rod Stewart's major hit "Da Ya Think I'm Sexy?" Elliott and Goulding, reviewing the script beforehand, didn't like the idea at all and tried to refuse it, but their deadpan rendition of the song became the hour's highlight. Near the beginning of the program, they announced a contest which would take suggestions for the "new capital of Pennsylvania", not specifically mentioning the very recent Three Mile Island nuclear accident that had taken place near Harrisburg.

In 1980, they were part of the cast of From Cleveland, a one-hour pilot for CBS late night which was largely the work of several cast members from SCTV. The show featured sketches with SCTV's Dave Thomas, Andrea Martin, Joe Flaherty, Eugene Levy and Catherine O'Hara, interspersed with footage of Bob and Ray hosting a radio show in a separate broadcast studio—Bob and Ray never actually appear on-screen with or interact with the other cast members. The show became a cult favorite with numerous showings at the Museum of Television & Radio.

This was followed by a series of specials for PBS in the early 1980s. In 1982, Ray Goulding told the New York Times, "It just keeps happening to us. I suppose each new generation notices that we are there."

Bob and Ray also appeared on The Ed Sullivan Show several times in the late 1950s and early '60s; guested on the Johnny Carson and David Letterman shows throughout the 1970s and '80s; provided voices for the animated 1981 special B.C.: A Special Christmas, and made guest appearances on episodes of The David Steinberg Show, Happy Days, and Trapper John, M.D..

== Other media ==
Theater program for The Two and Only, 1970

Elliott and Goulding starred in a pair of two-man stage shows: The Two and Only on Broadway in 1970 (featuring a Playbill drawn by Mort Drucker), and A Night of Two Stars at Carnegie Hall in 1984. They also did extensive work in radio and television commercials, and enjoyed supporting roles in the feature films Cold Turkey (1971), where they played caricatures of famous news personalities of that day, and Author! Author! (1982).

In 1960, Bob and Ray published a children's book based on some of their characters and routines, Linda Lovely and the Fleebus.

The duo also collaborated on three books collecting routines featuring some of their signature characters and routines: Write If You Get Work: The Best of Bob & Ray (1976; the title referenced Goulding's usual sign-off line), From Approximately Coast to Coast: It's The Bob & Ray Show (1983), and The New! Improved! Bob & Ray Book (1985). The team also recorded audiobook versions.

Along with the audio books and numerous collections of radio broadcasts, Bob and Ray recorded several albums, including recordings of their stage performances The Two and Only and A Night of Two Stars, Bob and Ray on a Platter, and Bob and Ray Throw a Stereo Spectacular.

== Later lives ==
Ray Goulding became ill in the late 1970s, suffering from kidney disease and enduring regular dialysis treatments. He was forced to adjust his working schedule to accommodate his regimen of hospital visits and treatments. Goulding refused to consider a kidney transplant, preferring to continue leading his life as he had been. Because of the new demands on Goulding's time, the team could no longer accept daily radio jobs or extensive advertising campaigns. This reduced their workload somewhat, but the team continued to work together for another decade, as outlined above.

Ray Goulding died on March 24, 1990. Elliott continued to perform, most notably with his son (actor/comedian Chris Elliott) on the TV sitcom Get a Life, on episodes of Newhart, LateLine and Late Night with David Letterman, in the films Cabin Boy (also with son Chris) and Quick Change, and on radio for the first season of Garrison Keillor's American Radio Company of the Air. Chris would join the cast of Saturday Night Live for season 20 in 1994, and his daughter Abby also joined the cast midway through season 34 in 2009, marking three generations of Elliotts appearing on the show.

Bob and Ray were inducted into the National Radio Hall of Fame in 1995. Many of their shows are available for listening at The Paley Center for Media in New York and Los Angeles. The Paley Center has such a large collection of Bob and Ray tapes that many of these remained uncatalogued for years.

Bob Elliott died of throat cancer on February 2, 2016.

== Honors ==
Bob and Ray won three Peabody Awards over the years, in 1951, 1956, and 1982.

Bob and Ray were inducted into the National Association of Broadcasters Hall of Fame in the radio division.

== Media ==
=== Video ===
- Piels commercial

=== Audio ===
- Bob and Ray (seven 1959–60 episodes)
- Matinee with Bob & Ray – Surviving installments of Bob & Ray's first regular series, WHDH, Boston
- Internet Archive – the surviving installments of Bob & Ray Present the CBS Radio Network (1959–60)
- Bob and Ray for the Truly Desperate – surviving installments of Bob and Ray from WOR (1973–76) and a hodgepodge of other recordings
- NBC Monitor Tribute Pages (features several Bob and Ray routines and reminiscences)
- "Bob And Ray Show". RadioEchoes. 1948–1976. 568 episodes.

=== Books ===
- Elliott, Bob; Goulding, Ray (1960). Bob and Ray's Story of Linda Lovely and the Fleebus. Illustrator: Michael J. Smollin. New York: Dodd, Mead & Company. LCCN 60-013904. OCLC 1418242.
- Elliott, Bob; Goulding, Ray (1975). Write If You Get Work: The Best of Bob & Ray. New York: Random House. ISBN 0-394-49668-X. LCCN 75-10297. OCLC 1502239.
- Elliott, Bob; Goulding, Ray (1983). From Approximately Coast to Coast... It's The Bob & Ray Show. New York: Atheneum. ISBN 9780689113956. LCCN 83-045069. OCLC 9393915.
- Elliott, Bob; Goulding, Ray (1985). The New! Improved! Bob & Ray Book. New York: G. P. Putnam's Sons. ISBN 0399130853. LCCN 85-006287. OCLC 1182627733.

== Timeline ==
- 1946: WHDH Boston (ad libbed together on the air)
- 1947–1951: WHDH Baseball Matinee (April 11, 1947 – June 30, 1951)

15 min then 30 min, became "Matinee with Bob and Ray"

- 1949: WMGM (Jan. 14, 1949)

one-time appearance filling in for Morey Amsterdam and were "discovered"

- 1951–1953: NBC Radio (July 2, 1951 – Sept. 28, 1953)

15 min 5:45 pm Mon–Fri, 1 hour Sat 9:30 pm

- 1951–1952: WNBC Radio (Aug 27, 1951 – Nov. 17, 1952)

Morning program (They spent 12 hours a day at NBC; 15 on Sat)

- 1951–1953: NBC-TV (Nov 26, 1951 – Sept 28, 1953)

15 min 7:30 pm weekdays
July 5, 1952 weekly half hour
Fall 1952 15 min 10:30 pm weekdays (and a variety of other slots)

- 1953–1954: ABC-TV (Oct 5, 1953 – July 2, 1954)

Also, some midnight shows on NBC radio

- 1954–1956: WINS (March 22, 1954 – May 25, 1956)

6:30–10:00 am

- 1955–?: NBC (June 12, 1955 – ?) NBC Monitor
- 1955–1957: Mutual Broadcasting System (Oct 3, 1955 – Sept 20, 1957) 5:05–6:00 pm

(since WOR was the main MBS studio, some sources count this is a stint at WOR)

- 1959–1960: CBS (June 29, 1959 – June 24, 1960)

No NBC monitor during this period. 7:45 p.m. weekdays; replaced Edward R. Murrow during his one-year leave

- 1962–1964: WHN (July 30, 1962 – June 30, 1964)

mornings (formerly WMGM)

- 1968–?: MGM/Verve Records (Sept 1968 – ?)

"Bob and Ray Music Factory" weekly syndicated program for MGM records, produced at WNEW-FM, New York

- 1973–1976: WOR (March 12, 1973 – April 30, 1976)

afternoon drive time 4:15–7:00 pm

- 1983–1987: National Public Radio (July 14, 1983 – April 5, 1987)

== General and cited references ==
- Dunning, John (1998). On the Air: The Encyclopedia of Old-Time Radio. New York: Oxford University Press. pp. 99–101. ISBN 9780195076783. OCLC 35586941.
