= Clara's Ghost =

- Film poster
- Directed by: Bridey Elliott
- Written by: Bridey Elliott
- Produced by: Rachel Nederveld; Sarah Winshall
- Starring: Bridey Elliott; Abby Elliott; Chris Elliott; Isidora Goreshter; Haley Joel Osment; Paula Niedert Elliott
- Cinematography: Markus Mentzer
- Edited by: Patrick Lawrence
- Music by: Stella Mozgawa
- Production companies: Smudge Films; Nighthorse Productions
- Distributed by: Orion Classics
- Release date: December 6, 2018 (limited)
- Running time: 93 minutes
- Country: United States
- Language: English

Clara's Ghost is a 2018 American comedy-drama film written by, directed by and starring Bridey Elliott and also starring Abby Elliott, Chris Elliott, Isidora Goreshter, Haley Joel Osment and Paula Niedert Elliott.

== Plot ==
Clara Reynolds lives in a historic Connecticut home with her husband Ted, a semi-famous actor. Searching for a shoe she believes she lost on the road, she attempts to report its disappearance at the police station. Her daughters Julie and Riley, working actors and former sitcom child stars, return home to celebrate the birthday of their family dog, Ollie. Belittled by her self-absorbed family, Clara experiences unusual visions around the house, including a ghostly woman begging to be let inside.

Riley buys marijuana from former classmate Joe, whom Ted invites to stay for dinner. A magazine photoshoot of Ted, Julie, and Riley leaves Clara feeling even more overlooked. During dinner, the ghost appears and leads Clara to angrily demand that the family stop mocking her, to no avail. As the others drunkenly dance to "MacArthur Park", the ghost embraces Clara, thanking her. Joe reveals that the Reynolds' home was built in 1862 by a sea captain for his daughter, Adelia; she was institutionalized before ever entering the house, and her father killed himself in the woods nearby.

Fed up with her family's disrespect, Clara defaces a self-portrait Ted was painting, while Ted, Julie, and Riley bicker about their careers. Ted, having been fired from a project by Julie's fiancé, criticizes an audition monologue he makes her perform, and nearly drowns Joe in a punch bowl. While the family performs a séance to summon the spirit of Adelia, Clara locks them in the basement and takes Joe upstairs. She kisses him, but apologizes and leads him downstairs to unlock the door, but instead tries to set fire to the basement. Joe intervenes, but leaves after Clara threatens him with a kitchen knife. She realizes the ghost is Adelia, whose spirit she has allowed into the house.

Ted breaks down the basement door but is unable to find Clara, and Riley is nearly hit by a flowerpot pushed by an unseen force. An erratic Clara confronts her family with the knife, and they discover Ollie has eaten unattended brownies. Disappearing into the woods, Clara appears to kill a coyote. Her family drives Ollie to the veterinarian, and are notified of a drunk woman at the police station, who turns out not to be Clara. Returning home, they find Clara’s bloody shirt at the edge of the woods, and discover her missing shoe in her closet. Driving through town, they discover Clara walking naked, and bring her home. As the family goes to sleep, Clara still hears the voice of Adelia.

== Cast ==
- Paula Niedert Elliott as Clara
- Chris Elliott as Ted
- Abby Elliott as Julie
- Bridey Elliott as Riley
- Isidora Goreshter as Adelia
- Haley Joel Osment as Joe

== Production ==
The film was shot entirely in Old Lyme, Connecticut. Filming lasted 17 days.

== Release ==
The film premiered at the 2018 Sundance Film Festival. On June 11, 2018, it was announced that Orion Classics acquired North American and Latin American distribution rights to the film. It was released in theaters on December 6, 2018 and on VOD and digital platforms on December 7, 2018.

== Reception ==
The film has a 74% rating on Rotten Tomatoes. The site's critical consensus reads, "As idiosyncratic as it is ambitious, Clara's Ghost can be as difficult to pin down as a spectral presence -- yet it also has a way of working itself under the skin." Metacritic, which uses a weighted average, assigned the film a score of 66 out of 100, based on 12 critics, indicating "generally favorable" reviews. Tomris Laffly of RogerEbert.com awarded the film one and a half stars. Mike D'Angelo of The A.V. Club graded the film a C−. Chuck Bowen of Slant Magazine gave the film three stars out of four. Andy Crump of Paste gave it a rating of 7.5. Dan Lybarger of Film Threat gave the film a 7 out of 10.

Dennis Harvey of Variety gave the film a negative review and wrote, "In the end, there’s not enough of distinction or substance to make this absurdist family comedy with a haunted-house angle feel like more than a short’s worth of ideas stretched too thin."

Justin Lowe of The Hollywood Reporter gave the film a positive review and wrote, "Infrequent actress Paula Niedert Elliott delights in the titular role with a quirky, sympathetic performance that gradually reveals the extent of Clara's psychological wounds."
