= Slow Talkers of America =

Comedy routine by Bob and Ray

Slow Talkers of America is the title of a classic comedy routine by Bob and Ray. It was released on their live performance albums The Two and Only and A Night of Two Stars. In the routine, Ray Goulding interviews Bob Elliot as Harlow P. Whitcomb, who is playing the President "and Recording Secretary" of the Slow Talkers of America. Instead of drawing his individual words out, Whitcomb speaks the words at a normal speed, but leaves long pauses between them. Ray starts guessing what the next word will be, and speaking his guesses out loud during the pauses, in frustration at waiting. At first he is fairly successful at guessing what Whitcomb is going to say, but soon Whitcomb starts intentionally changing his responses to make Ray's guesses wrong. Ray's frustration increases until he can't take any more, and brings the interview to an end.

In their Broadway show The Two and Only, they put a variation in the routine. Bob announced that he was going to tell Ray the "credo of the S....T....O....A." The curtain dropped for a 15-minute intermission. When the audience returned, Bob and Ray were sitting in the same places. Bob said, "And that about wraps up the credo of the STOA."

The routine was repurposed for the 2016 Disney animated feature Zootopia, using a sloth as the slow talker.
