= Abby Elliott =

American actress (born 1987)

- Born: Abigail Elliott; June 16, 1987 (age 39); New York City, U.S.
- Occupations: Actress; comedian
- Years active: 2003–present
- Spouse: Bill Kennedy (m. 2016)
- Children: 2
- Father: Chris Elliott
- Relatives: Bridey Elliott (sister); Bob Elliott (grandfather); Steve Higgins (uncle); John Higgins (cousin)

Abigail Elliott (born June 16, 1987) is an American actress and comedian. She was a cast member on the NBC sketch comedy series Saturday Night Live from 2008 to 2012, and has starred on the Bravo comedy Odd Mom Out, the NBC sitcom Indebted, and the FX/Hulu comedy drama The Bear. She is the daughter of actor and comedian Chris Elliott and sister of Bridey Elliott.

== Early life ==
Elliott was born on June 16, 1987, in New York City, the elder of two children. She is the daughter of Paula Niedert, a talent coordinator, and actor/comedian Chris Elliott. Her grandfather was radio comedian Bob Elliott. Her younger sister is actress Bridey Elliott; they were both raised in Wilton, Connecticut. She attended high school at Immaculate High School in Danbury, Connecticut, where she acted in school plays and musicals. After graduating from Immaculate High School in 2005, she attended Marymount Manhattan College in New York City but dropped out during her first semester.

== Career ==
Elliott took comedy classes at The Groundlings and eventually began training and performing in various sketch comedy shows at the Upright Citizens Brigade Theatre (UCB) in Los Angeles.

In 2006, Elliott appeared with supporting roles for the pilots You've Reached the Elliotts and Chrissy: Plain & Simple, both sitcoms that star her father, Chris Elliott. While at UCBT, she frequently performed with The Midnight Show sketch troupe. She has also occasionally performed comedy with her sister Bridey. Before joining the cast of SNL, Elliott had also done guest voices roles on King of the Hill and Minoriteam. She has also been featured in a number of Late Night with Jimmy Fallon sketches such as "Jersey Floor" and "Studio 6-Bee". Elliott made her film debut with a small role in No Strings Attached, and has since had supporting roles in the films High Road and Fun Size.

=== Saturday Night Live ===
Elliott joined the cast of SNL midway through the 2008–2009 season (season 34), in November 2008, following the departure of Amy Poehler. She is the third generation of her family to have been featured on SNL. She is the second generation of her family to be hired as a cast member, and her tenure on the show was longer than both her father and grandfather. Her father, Chris Elliott, was an SNL cast member during the 1994–1995 season (season 20) and her grandfather, Bob Elliott, was one half of the popular comedy duo Bob & Ray. Bob Elliott co-starred on a Christmas episode in the 1978–1979 season (season 4).

After four seasons on SNL, Elliott was let go from the show prior to its 38th season. After leaving SNL in 2012, Elliott has made guest appearances on television programs such as 2 Broke Girls, How I Met Your Mother, Happy Endings, and Inside Amy Schumer. From 2015 to 2017, she co-starred on the Bravo series Odd Mom Out. In 2020, she starred in the Fran Drescher sitcom Indebted on NBC.

=== The Bear ===
From 2022 to 2026, Elliott played Natalie Berzatto on the FX on Hulu comedy-drama The Bear. Her performance in the second season garnered her a nomination at the 81st Golden Globe Awards for Best Supporting Actress – Series, Miniseries or Television Film.

== Personal life ==
From 2010 to 2011, Elliott dated fellow Saturday Night Live cast member Fred Armisen.

Elliott married television writer Bill Kennedy on September 3, 2016. They have two children. On July 18, 2026, it was announced that Elliott was filing for divorce from Kennedy.

== Filmography ==
=== Film ===
Year	Title	Role	Notes
2011	No Strings Attached	Joy	
2011	My Anime Girlfriend	Yuruki	Short film
2011	High Road	Monica	
2012	Fun Size	Lara	
2014	Life Partners	Vanessa	
2014	Teenage Mutant Ninja Turtles	Taylor	
2014	Sex Ed	Trish	
2016	Better Off Single	Angela	
2018	Clara's Ghost	Julie	
2022	Cheaper by the Dozen	Tricia	
2026	Purgatory	Marianne Gravel	
TBA	The Adventures of Drunky	TBA	Voice
TBA	The Kellys	TBA	Filming

=== Television ===
Year	Title	Role	Notes
2006	Minoriteam	Computer	Voice; episode: "The Internet 2.0"
2008	King of the Hill	Various	Voice; 4 episodes
2008–2012	Saturday Night Live	Herself / Various	81 episodes
2009	Saturday Night Live Weekend Update Thursday	Kristin Cavallari	Episode: "2.2"
2012	Ugly Americans	Emily	Voice; episode: "Journey to the Center of Twayne"
2012	2 Broke Girls	Ruth	Episode: "And the New Boss"
2013	Happy Endings	Katie	Episode: "The Straight Dope"
2013–2014	How I Met Your Mother	Jeanette Peterson	5 episodes
2013–2014	Inside Amy Schumer	Bree / Joselyn	2 episodes
2014	Garfunkel & Oates	Chevrolet	Episode: "Rule 34"
2015–2017	Odd Mom Out	Brooke Von-Weber	Main cast
2015–2019	Star vs. the Forces of Evil	Janna	Voice; recurring role
2016	Difficult People	Kayla	Episode: "Patches"
2016–2018	Home: Adventures with Tip & Oh	Chelsea	Voice; recurring role
2018	Alone Together	Megan	Episode: "Big Bear"
2020	Indebted	Rebecca Klein	Main cast
2022	Search Party	Dr. Amanda Baby	Episode: "Lamentations"
2022–2026	The Bear	Natalie "Sugar" Berzatto	Main cast
2025	Krapopolis	Lachesis	Voice; episode: "John Fate Comes a-Knockin"
2025	All Her Fault	Lia Irvine	Main cast

== Awards and nominations ==
Year	Association	Category	Project	Result	Ref.
2023	Screen Actors Guild Awards	Outstanding Performance by an Ensemble in a Comedy Series	The Bear	Nominated	
2024	Golden Globe Awards	Best Supporting Actress – Series, Miniseries or Television Film	The Bear	Nominated	
2024	Screen Actors Guild Awards	Outstanding Performance by an Ensemble in a Comedy Series	The Bear	Won	
2024	Astra TV Awards	Astra TV Award for Best Supporting Actress in a Streaming Comedy Series	The Bear	Nominated	
2025	Screen Actors Guild Awards	Outstanding Performance by an Ensemble in a Comedy Series	The Bear	Nominated	
2026	Actor Awards	Outstanding Performance by an Ensemble in a Comedy Series	The Bear	Nominated	
