= Vail Mountain School =

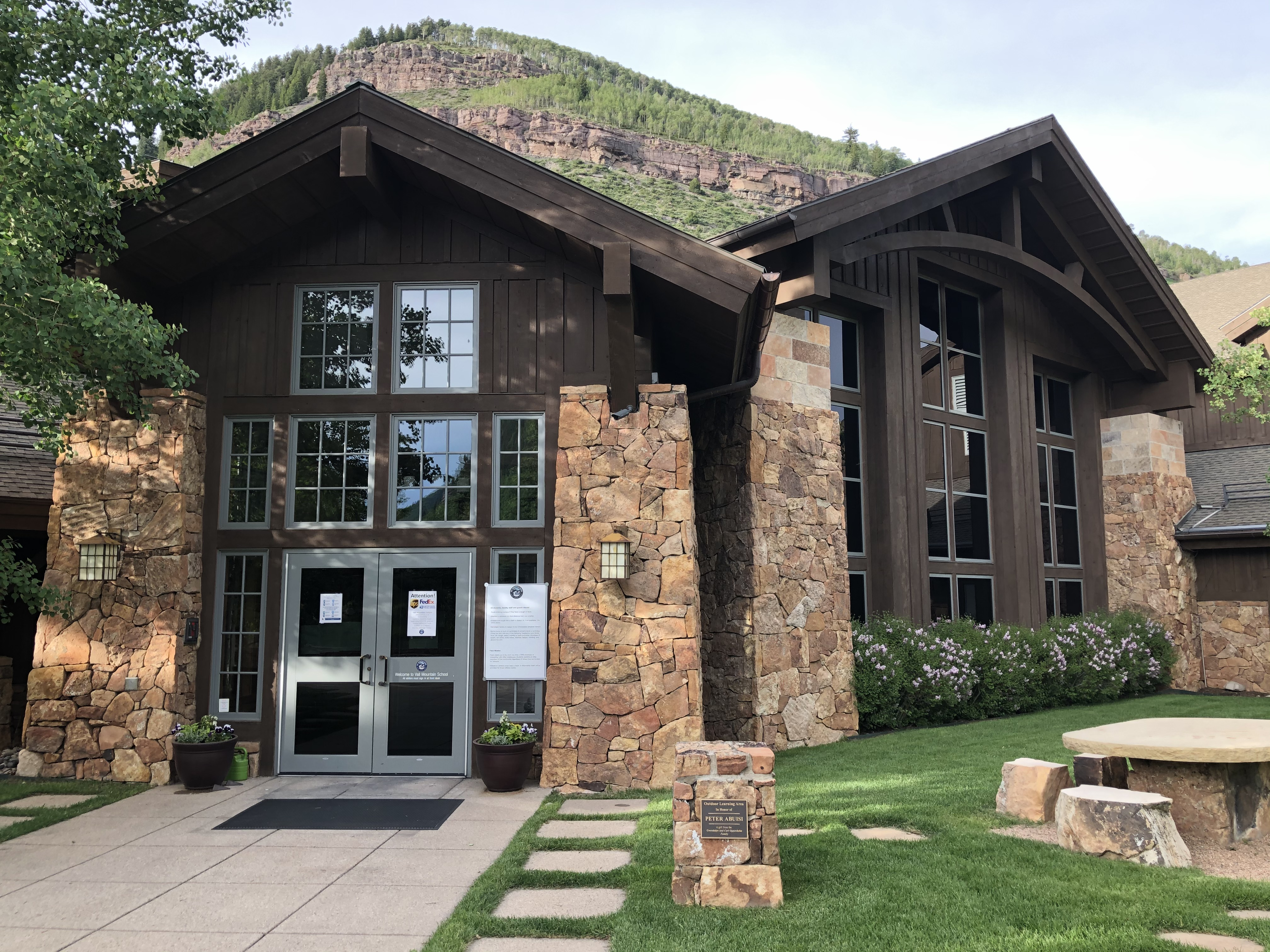

Location
- 3000 Booth Falls Rd; Vail, Colorado 81657; United States
- Coordinates: 39°38′52″N 106°19′09″W

Information
- CEEB code: 061384
- Staff: 58.00 (FTE)
- Enrollment: 444 (2022–2023)
- Student to teacher ratio: 7.7
- Website: www.vms.edu

Vail Mountain School (VMS) is an independent K -12 college preparatory school in Vail, Colorado.

VMS is accredited by the Association of Colorado Independent Schools and is a member of the National Association of Independent Schools. Its curriculum includes fine art, music, performing arts, and a physical training program.

== Notable alumni ==
- Mike Johnston, Class of 1993, mayor of Denver
