= Bridey Elliott =

American actress, comedian and filmmaker (born 1990)

- Born: July 27, 1990 (age 36)
- Father: Chris Elliott
- Relatives: Abby Elliott (sister); Bob Elliott (grandfather); Steve Higgins (uncle); John Higgins (cousin)

Bridey Elliott (born July 27, 1990) is an American actress, comedian, writer, and film director.

== Career ==
After graduating from the National Theater Institute in Waterford, Connecticut, Elliott performed stand-up in New York City and became a regular at the improv-sketch comedy Upright Citizens Brigade.

Elliott starred in the SXSW Grand Jury Prize–winning Fort Tilden (2015), and had a role in Steven Soderbergh's film Mosaic (2017). She also had a part in the HBO comedy Silicon Valley, and played tennis player Julie Heldman in Battle of the Sexes (2017).

Elliott's directorial debut, the short comedy Affections, premiered at the 2016 Sundance Film Festival and went on to win the Special Jury Prize at the Independent Film Festival Boston. Her feature-length directorial debut, Clara's Ghost, stars her mother, Paula Nierdert Elliott, and Haley Joel Osment; it premiered at the 2018 Sundance Film Festival. Her Saturday Night Live alumni father and sister were also in the movie, which was filmed at their home in Old Lyme, Connecticut.

== Personal life ==
Elliott's mother is a talent coordinator, and her father is actor/comedian Chris Elliott. Her grandfather was radio comedian Bob Elliott. Her older sister is actress/comedian Abby Elliott; they were both raised in Wilton, Connecticut.

== Filmography ==
=== Film ===
Year	Title	Role	Notes
2014	Fort Tilden	Harper	
2015	Hello, My Name Is Doris	Sasha	
2016	Director's Cut	Wardrobe Girl	
2016	Paper Anchor	Casey	
2017	Battle of the Sexes	Julie Heldman	
2018	Clara's Ghost	Riley Reynolds	Also screenwriter
2019	The Petal Pushers	Emily	
2023	Dogleg	Cigarette Girl	
2025	By Design	Regina	
2025	Blue Eyed Girl	Cici	

=== Television ===
Year	Title	Role	Notes
2011	Empires	Francine	Television film
2012, 2013	Eagleheart	Hostess / Fan Girl	2 episodes
2014	Low Budget Sketch Show	—N/a	6 episodes
2015	Ramsey Has a Time Machine	Genius	Episode: "Trapped"
2015–2017	The Special Without Brett Davis	Various roles	3 episodes
2016	Thanksgiving	Olive Morgan	6 episodes
2016	Search Party	Penelope	Episode: "The Mystery of the Golden Charm"
2016, 2017	Silicon Valley	Winnie	2 episodes
2017, 2018	Mosaic	Tia	2 episodes
2018	Corporate	Daphnre	Episode: "Weekend"
2018	Ching Chong Blues	Cordelia	Episode: "C4C"
2019	This Close	Nancy Farger	Episode: "Three's Company"
