= Ray Goulding =

Comedian

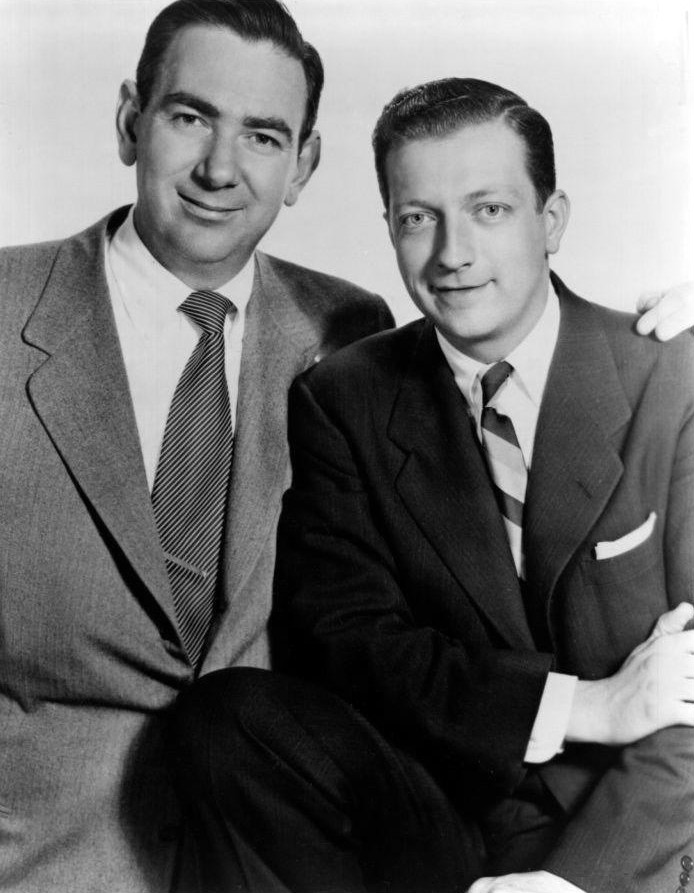
- Goulding at left with Bob Elliott on Monitor in 1960
- Born: Raymond Walter Goulding; March 20, 1922; Lowell, Massachusetts, U.S.
- Died: March 24, 1990 (aged 68); Manhasset, New York, U.S.
- Occupations: Comedian, actor
- Years active: 1946–1990

Raymond Walter Goulding (March 20, 1922 – March 24, 1990) was an American comedian, who, together with Bob Elliott formed the comedy duo of Bob and Ray.

== Early life ==
Goulding was born in Lowell, Massachusetts; he was the fourth of five children of Thomas Goulding, an overseer in a textile mill, and his wife Mary. Upon graduation from high school at age 17, Ray Goulding was hired as a $15-a-week announcer on local station WLLH, using the name 'Dennis Howard' to avoid confusion with his older brother Phil, an announcer in Boston radio at the time. A year later Ray was hired by Boston radio station WEEI under his own name.

His career was interrupted in 1942 by World War II. After graduating from U.S. Army OCS, he was posted to Fort Knox, Kentucky as an instructor, attaining the rank of captain. While stationed there he met his wife, then-Lt. Mary Elizabeth Leader, likewise attached to the base as a dietitian. They married in 1945 and would eventually have four sons and two daughters.

== Bob and Ray ==
Upon his discharge in 1946, Goulding was hired on at Boston station WHDH, where he served as newsreader for the morning program hosted by Bob Elliott. The two men soon discovered an extraordinary comedic rapport and found themselves in-demand as a team. Standing six-foot-two, heavyset and possessing a distinctive baritone voice, Goulding made an effective contrast to his partner both physically and vocally, usually taking on similarly outsize roles in their skits. His dead-on impersonation of Senator Joseph McCarthy inspired a pointed series of Bob & Ray sketches at the height of the Army-McCarthy hearings. He also played all the female roles (using falsetto), most notably cooking expert "Mary Margaret McGoon." In 1949, Goulding as Mary recorded a novelty cover of "I'd Like to Be a Cow in Switzerland", which became a local hit.

== National prominence and television pioneer ==
In 1951, Elliott and Goulding were hired by NBC Radio, beginning a four-decade-long association with the network. Also in 1951, they began a short-lived but influential television series "Bob and Ray", which featured Audrey Meadows and Cloris Leachman. In 1955, the team became resident comedians on NBC's Monitor radio series. In 1956, he and Elliott won a Peabody Award for broadcast excellence.

== Personal life ==
Away from the studio, Goulding's hobbies included photography and sport shooting. Together with Bob Elliott he also wrote a couple of humorous articles for Mad Magazine in the 1950s. He was a lifelong Boston Red Sox fan. Ray Goulding died of kidney failure at his home in Manhasset on New York's Long Island in 1990, four days after his 68th birthday.

Preceded by Dennis James	Host of The Name's the Same; April 11 - June 21, 1955; With: Bob Elliott	Succeeded by Clifton Fadiman
