= Chris Elliott =

American actor, writer, and comedian (born 1960)

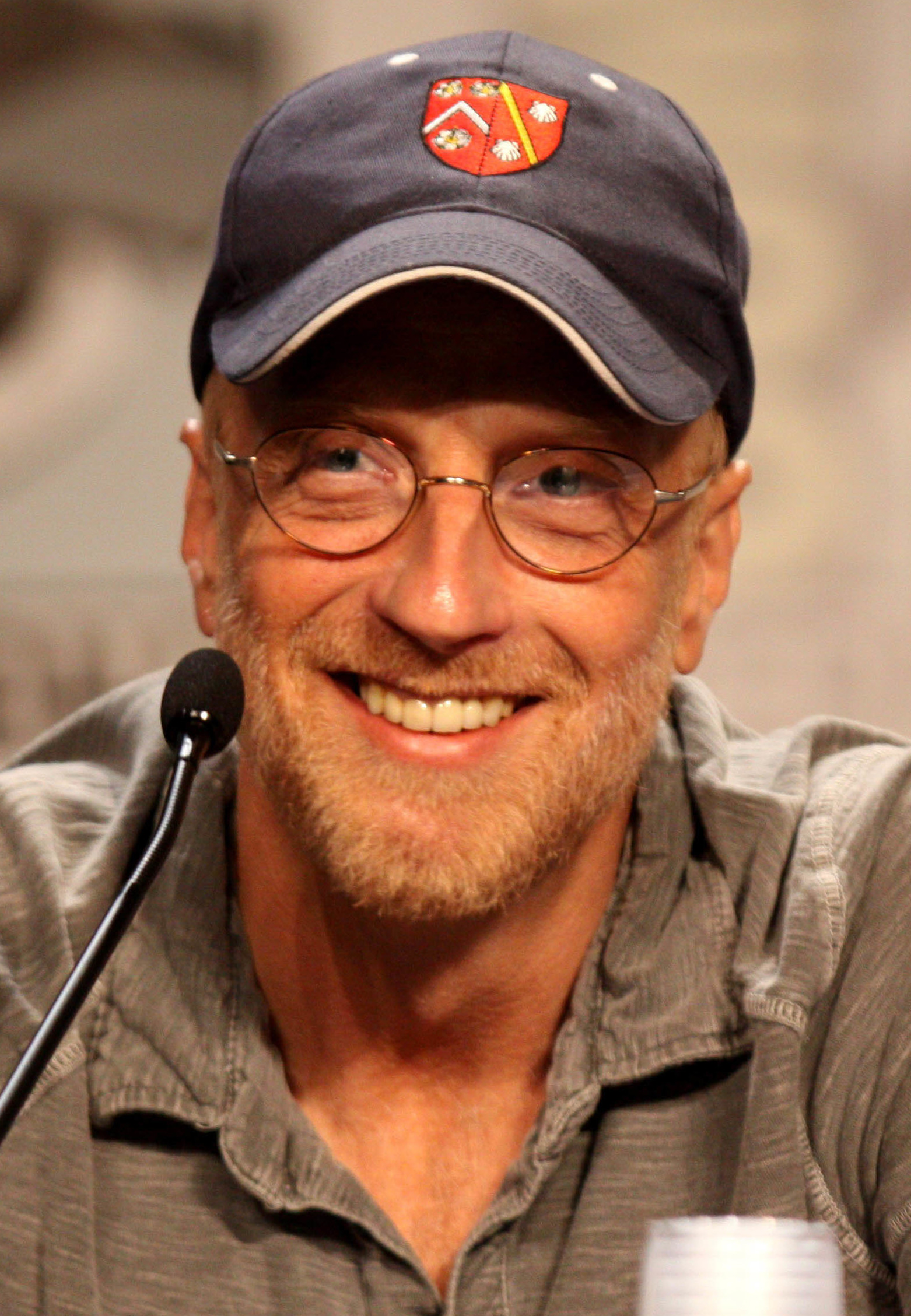
- Elliott at the 2011 San Diego Comic-Con
- Born: Christopher Nash Elliott; May 31, 1960 (age 66); New York City, U.S.
- Occupations: Actor; comedian; writer
- Years active: 1982–present
- Spouse: Paula Niedert Elliott (m. 1986)
- Children: Abby; Bridey
- Parent: Bob Elliott (father)
- Relatives: Steve Higgins (brother-in-law); John Higgins (nephew)

Christopher Nash Elliott (born May 31, 1960) is an American actor, comedian and writer known for his surreal sense of humor. He was a regular performer on Late Night with David Letterman while working as a writer there (1983–1988), created and starred in the comedy series Get a Life (1990–1992) on Fox, and wrote and starred in the film Cabin Boy (1994) and appeared in multiple sequels in the Scary Movie film series, most notably as the character Hanson. His writing for Letterman won four consecutive Primetime Emmy Awards.

His other television appearances include recurring roles on Everybody Loves Raymond (2003–2005) and How I Met Your Mother (2005–2014), as well as spending one season as a cast member on Saturday Night Live (1994–1995). Starring roles on television include Chris Monsanto in Adult Swim's Eagleheart (2011–2014) and Roland Schitt in Schitt's Creek (2015–2020). He appeared in many films, including Groundhog Day (1993), There's Something About Mary (1998), Snow Day (2000), Scary Movie 2 (2001) and The Rewrite (2014).

== Early life ==
Elliott was born in New York City, and is the youngest of five children of Lee (née Peppers), a model and TV director, and Bob Elliott, who was part of the comedy team Bob and Ray. He grew up on the Upper East Side. He attended the National Theater Institute at the Eugene O'Neill Theater Center for a semester.

== Career ==
=== Letterman years (1982–1990) ===
Elliott was hired as a production assistant on Late Night with David Letterman, and was with the show from its beginning in February 1982. In the middle of 1983, Elliott became a writer on the show and his on-camera appearances became more frequent. Elliott became best friends and writing partners with Matt Wickline, another Letterman crew member who was promoted to the writing staff in 1983. Wickline and Elliott pitched Late Night's first theme show, an Emmy-winning interactive episode called "The Custom-Made Show, leading the program to do a series of ambitious experimental one-off episodes. Along with the rest of the writing staff, he won four Emmys for his work on the show and was nominated for an additional six.

Elliott became known in the mid-1980s for playing an assortment of recurring quirky, oddball characters on Late Night, each of which would usually last for a few weeks to a few months, before being retired amidst much mock-fanfare on the show. Elliott and Wickline co-wrote his early pieces on the show, often about characters who had "Guy" in the name, including The Conspiracy Guy, The Panicky Guy, Terminator parody The Regulator Guy, The Fugitive parody "The Fugitive Guy," and most famously, The Guy Under The Seats, a man who lived under the studio audience seating and would get mad at and threaten Letterman.

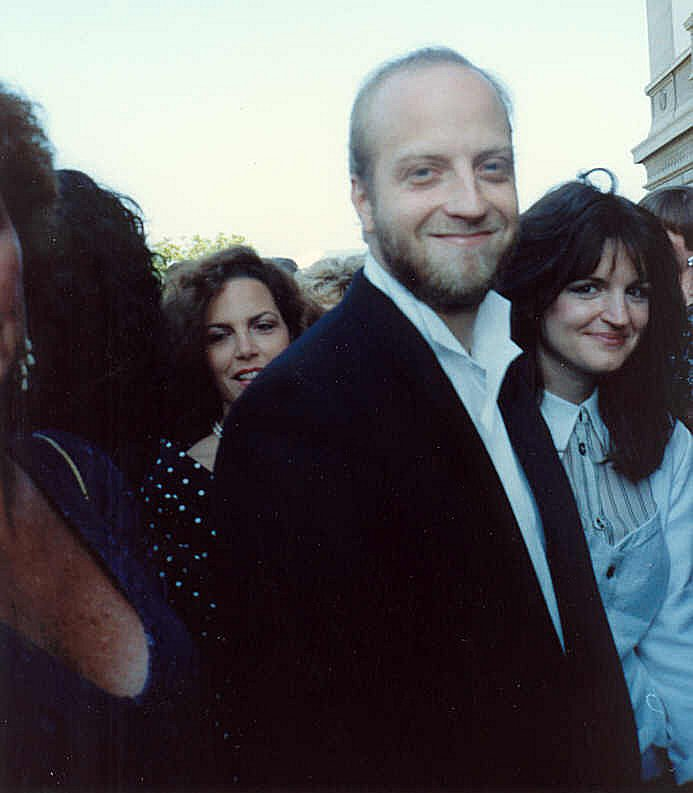
Chris Elliott at the 41st Emmy Awards in 1989

In 1987, while still working at Letterman, Elliott starred in two Cinemax Comedy Experiment TV specials called FDR: A One Man Show and Action Family. He co-wrote both specials with Letterman writers Matt Wickline and Sandy Frank. FDR: A One Man Show was a fake play about the life and times of Franklin D. Roosevelt (influenced by Frank Perry's 1984 TV movie J.F.K.: A One-Man Show). Elliott looked and sounded nothing like Roosevelt; he portrayed events from his life that never happened, such as a Japanese bombing of the White House, and his crossing the Potomac in a rowboat. By the end of the show, he had performed Gallagher's shtick of smashing watermelons and other soft fruits on stage.

Following these specials, Elliott and Wickline had a falling out, as Elliott had begun collaborating more with fellow Letterman writer Adam Resnick on his pieces on the show. Elliott and Resnick's character bits found him playing self-involved show business people, both real and fake. These characters include Rip Taylor-esque Las Vegas lounge lizard Skylark, talk show host Chris Elliott Jr. (a la Morton Downey Jr.), and exaggerated surreal impressions of Marlon Brando, Jay Leno, and Marv Albert.

As his career on Late Night blossomed, Elliott auditioned to join the cast of Saturday Night Live when Lorne Michaels returned to the program in 1985. He was offered the job but turned it down to stay at Letterman. He began taking small film roles, often as a supporting actor in films such as Michael Mann's Manhunter and James Cameron's The Abyss. He had a small supporting role in an episode of Miami Vice.

=== 1990s ===
Elliott left Late Night in early 1990 and moved to Los Angeles, though he would return as a guest interview subject many times on Late Night and Letterman's subsequent talk show Late Show with David Letterman.

In 1990, Elliott starred in his own sitcom, Get a Life, which he co-created with his frequent Letterman collaborator Adam Resnick. The show was about a 30-year-old paperboy named Chris Peterson who lived at home with his parents. Elliott's real-life father, Bob Elliott, appeared in the show as Chris's father. The January 1999 issue of TV Guide called the "Zoo Animals on Wheels" episode the 19th funniest TV moment of all time.

In 1993, Elliott teamed up with producer Brad Hall and directed a series of critically acclaimed short films that Elliott showed when appearing on Late Show with David Letterman. That year he appeared in a prominent supporting role as Bill Murray's cameraman in the Harold Ramis film Groundhog Day.

In the early 1990s, director Tim Burton became a fan of Get a Life, and, in an attempt to re-create the success of his film Pee-Wee's Big Adventure, hired Elliott and Resnick to write a movie for Elliott to star in. The two scripted Cabin Boy, which Burton was set to direct. Burton bowed out of his role as director so he could make Ed Wood, and Resnick became Cabin Boy's director. Although it has since garnered a cult following, Cabin Boy, which featured a short appearance by Elliott's old boss, David Letterman, opened in 1994 to bad reviews and scant box office returns, and netted Elliott a Razzie Award for Worst New Star.

Following Cabin Boy's dismal reception, Elliott accepted an offer to join the cast of Saturday Night Live for the 1994 season and moved back to New York City. He had a "terrible time" on the show, finding himself to be "too old," and disliking the toxic environment and late hours. The season was critically reviled, and a New York magazine reporter who embedded with the show for four weeks wrote a scathing piece called "Comedy Isn't Funny", in which Elliott was quoted expressing his unhappiness at the show. At the end of 94–95 season, Elliott left the show amidst a major overhaul in the cast and writing team.

Following his departure from SNL, Elliott continued to appear in supporting parts in films and TV shows. He joined the ensemble cast of the NBC sitcom The Naked Truth for its third season. The show was subsequently canceled. He played Ben Stiller's best friend in the Farrelly Brothers hit comedy There's Something About Mary, reinvigorating his film career.

=== 2000s ===
Elliott began the decade with a major role as the villain in the Nickelodeon movie Snow Day. In the fall of 2000, he returned to a series regular role on television, starring alongside Steven Weber in the NBC sitcom Cursed. Cursed was given the coveted Must See TV timeslot post-Friends, but after being retooled and retitled The Weber Show, the program was canceled.

Next, Elliott played prominent supporting parts in Scary Movie 2 and Osmosis Jones, which reunited him with Bill Murray and frequent collaborators The Farrelly Brothers. From 2003 to 2005, he had a recurring role as Robert's strange brother-in-law Peter MacDougall in the last three seasons of Everybody Loves Raymond.

Elliott spent much of the decade attempting to create another show for himself, selling a family sitcom to Fox in 2004 and one to CBS in 2006. Neither made it to air. In 2007, he starred in Chrissy: Plain & Simple, a pilot for his own sketch show for Comedy Central. Elliott had a recurring role on How I Met Your Mother, playing the estranged father of character Lily Aldrin from 2009 to 2014.

=== 2010s–present ===
In 2011, Elliott returned to a leading role on TV for the first time since Get a Life, starring in the Adult Swim series Eagleheart. Created by Michael Koman and Andrew Weinberg and produced by Conan O'Brien, Eagleheart found Chris Elliott starring as U.S. Marshal Chris Monsanto in an exaggerated, dark version of a fake Walker, Texas Ranger-esque TV procedural. The show aired for three seasons and became a cult hit.

In 2015, Elliott became part of the ensemble cast of Schitt's Creek, starring alongside Eugene Levy and Catherine O'Hara as town mayor Roland Schitt. The series ran for six seasons, winning nine Emmys, and netting Elliott a Screen Actors Guild Award. In 2022, he was part of the cast of the short-lived Hulu series Maggie.

== Personal life ==
Elliott has been married to Paula Niedert since 1986. Niedert worked as a talent coordinator on Late Night with David Letterman when they met. They have two daughters: Abby and Bridey. Abby was a cast member of Saturday Night Live from 2008 until 2012, making her the first SNL cast member to be the child of a previous cast member. His father Bob Elliott, of the comedy duo Bob & Ray, co-starred on an SNL Christmas episode in the 1978–1979 season. He and his family live in Old Lyme, Connecticut, and maintain a house in Harpswell, Maine.

== Filmography ==
=== Film ===
Year	Title	Role	Notes
1983	Lianna	Lighting Assistant	
1984	Gremloids	Hopper	
1985	My Man Adam	Mr. Spooner	
1986	Manhunter	Zeller	
1989	The Abyss	Bendix	
1989	New York Stories	Robber	
1993	The Travelling Poet	Alan Squire	Short film; also director
1993	CB4	A. White	
1993	Groundhog Day	Larry	
1994	Cabin Boy	Nathanial Mayweather	
1994	Poolside Ecstasy	The Pool Boy	Short film; also director
1994	Housewives: The Making of the Cast Album	Chris the Diva	Short film; also director
1996	Kingpin	The Gambler	
1998	There's Something About Mary	Dom Woganowski	
2000	The Sky is Falling	Santa Claus	
2000	Nutty Professor II: The Klumps	Restaurant Manager	Cameo
2000	Snow Day	Roger "Snowplowman" Stubblefield	
2001	Osmosis Jones	Bob	
2001	Scary Movie 2	Hanson	
2006	Scary Movie 4	Ezekiel	
2007	Thomas Kinkade's Home for Christmas	Ernie Trevor	
2007	I'll Believe You	Eugene the Gator Guy	
2009	Dance Flick	Ron	
2010	Speed-Dating	Inspector Green	
2012	The Dictator	Mr. Ogden	
2012	The Library	Himself	
2014	The Rewrite	Jim	
2016	Better Off Single	Angela's Dad	
2017	Sandy Wexler	Mr. Buttons	
2017	Frat Star	Eugene Cooper	
2017	How to Get Girls	Mr. P	
2018	Clara's Ghost	Ted Reynolds	
2021	Christmas vs. the Walters	Dr. Tom	
2023	Welcome to Redville	Sheriff Brooks	
2024	Carved	Earl	
2026	Busboys	Troy	
2026	Scary Movie	Shorthand	

=== Television ===
Year	Title	Role	Notes
1982–1988	Late Night with David Letterman	Various roles	Also writer
1986	FDR: A One Man Show	Franklin Delano Roosevelt	Television film, co-written with Matt Wickline
1987	Action Family	Chris	Television film, co-written with Matt Wickline
1987	Miami Vice	Danny Allred	Episode: "Down for the Count: Part II"
1987	The Equalizer	Rags Maloney	Episode: "Coal Black Soul"
1987–1988	Friday Night Videos	Host, various	3 episodes
1989	Tattingers	Spin	3 episodes
1990–1992	Get a Life	Chris Peterson	Series regular, 36 episodes
1992	Medusa: Dare to Be Truthful	Andy	Television film
1993–2015	The Late Show with David Letterman	Himself/Various Roles	Regular guest, 51 episodes
1994	The Adventures of Pete & Pete	Meterman Ray	Episode: "Sick Day"
1994–1995	Saturday Night Live	Various roles	Series regular, 20 episodes
1995–1996	Murphy Brown	Steve	2 episodes
1995	The Larry Sanders Show	Himself	Episode: "Larry's Sitcom"
1995	The Barefoot Executive	Jase Wallenberg	Television film
1996	Wings	Steve	Episode: "...Like a Neighbor Scorned"
1997	Duckman	Dr. Reamus Elliott (voice)	Episode: "All About Elliott"
1997	Sabrina the Teenage Witch	Warren	Episode: "Mars Attracts!"
1997–1998	The Naked Truth	Bradley Crosby	Series regular, 22 episodes
1998	Hercules	Triton (voice)	Episode: "Hercules and the Son of Poseidon"
1998	The Nanny	Chris Malley	Episode: "Oh, Say, Can You Ski?"
1999	Tracey Takes On...	Gilbert Bronson	Episode: "Books"
1999–2000	Dilbert	Dogbert (voice)	Series regular, 30 episodes
2000	The Outer Limits	Jack Parson	Episode: "Judgment Day"
2000–2001	Cursed	Larry Heckman	Series regular, 17 episodes
2001–2006	The King of Queens	F. Moynihan / Pete	2 episodes
2001	Ed	Chet Bellafiore	Episode: "The New World"
2002–2004	According to Jim	Reverend Pierson	3 episodes
2002	Still Standing	Jeff Hackman	Episode: "Still Spending"
2003–2005	Everybody Loves Raymond	Peter MacDougall	10 episodes
2003–2008	King of the Hill	Chris Sizemore / Ed Burnett / Rob Holguin (voice)	5 episodes
2004	Third Watch	Jeffrey Barton	2 episodes
2005	That '70s Show	Mr Bray	Episode: "2000 Light Years from Home"
2006	Minoriteam	Space Drifter (voice)	Episode: "Space Driftin'"
2008	Code Monkeys	Chris (voice)	Episode: "Benny's Birthday"
2008–2015	Law & Order: Special Victims Unit	Anton Thibodeaux / Pete Matthews	2 episodes
2009–2014	How I Met Your Mother	Mickey Aldrin	11 episodes
2010	Futurama	V-Giny (voice)	Episode: "In-A-Gadda-Da-Leela"
2011–2014	Eagleheart	Chris Monsanto	Series regular, 34 episodes
2011	SpongeBob SquarePants	Captain/Lord Poltergeist (voice)	Episode: "Ghoul Fools"
2011	Bored to Death	Fishman	Episode: "Forget the Herring"
2012	Metalocalypse	Klokateer / Dr. Commander Vermin Chuntspinkton (voice)	2 episodes
2014	Community	Russell Borchert	Episode: "Basic Sandwich"
2014	Hot in Cleveland	Luke	Episode: "Elka Takes a Lover"
2014	The Birthday Boys	Dr. Gerard Loudon	Episode: "The U.S. Healthcare System"
2015–2020	Schitt's Creek	Roland Schitt	Series regular, 79 episodes
2015	The Good Wife	Adrian Fluke	Episode: "Hail Mary"
2015	Nurse Jackie	Vigilante Jones	Episode: "Vigilante Jones"
2015	The Knick	Port Authority Officer	Episode: "There Are Rules"
2016	Graves	Thomas Nash	3 episodes
2016	Thanksgiving	Don Morgan	Main role; 8 episodes
2017	Friends from College	Mentalist	Episode: "A Night of Surprises"
2017	Difficult People	Rick	Episode: "Rabbitversary"
2017	Fresh Off the Boat	Adam	2 episodes
2017	The Last Man on Earth	Glenn	2 episodes
2017	At Home with Amy Sedaris	Rich Uncle	Episode: "Entertaining for Peanuts"
2020	The Shivering Truth	(voice)	Episode: "The Diff"
2022	Maggie	Jack	Series regular, 13 episodes
2023	Agent Elvis	Timothy Leary (voice)	3 episodes
2026	Robot Chicken Adult Swim Special	Chris Monsanto (voice)	Television Special

== Bibliography ==
Elliott has written four books spoofing history or pseudo-history. Daddy's Boy: A Son's Shocking Account of Life with a Famous Father is a comedic fictionalized biography about growing up with his famous father, spoofing Christina Crawford's Mommie Dearest. The Shroud of the Thwacker is a historical novel about Elliott's investigation of a serial killer in 1882 New York City, spoofing London's Jack the Ripper case. Into Hot Air tells the story of Chris climbing Mount Everest with a group of celebrities tagging along to underwrite the trek as he investigates his Uncle Percy's failed Everest expedition. And The Guy Under The Sheets is an "unauthorized autobiography" that tells a comedically fictional version of Elliott's life in which Elliott "reveals" that he is the son not of comedian Bob Elliott, but, rather, of playwright Sam Elliott and actress Bette Davis.

Year	Title	Publisher
1989	Daddy's Boy: A Son's Shocking Account of Life with a Famous Father	Delacorte Press
2005	The Shroud of the Thwacker	Miramax Books
2007	Into Hot Air	Weinstein Books
2012	The Guy Under The Sheets: The Unauthorized Biography	Blue Rider Press

== Awards and nominations ==
=== Primetime Emmy Awards ===
Year	Category	Nominated work	Result	Episode
1984	Outstanding Writing in a Variety Or Music Program	Late Night with David Letterman	Won	"Show #291"
1984	Outstanding Writing in a Variety Or Music Program	Late Night with David Letterman	Nominated	"Show #312"
1985	Outstanding Writing in a Variety Or Music Program	Late Night with David Letterman	Won	"Christmas with the Lettermans"
1985	Outstanding Writing in a Variety Or Music Program	Late Night with David Letterman	Nominated	"Late Night in Los Angeles"
1985	Outstanding Writing in a Variety Or Music Program	Late Night with David Letterman	Nominated	"The Late Night Morning Show"
1986	Outstanding Writing in a Variety Or Music Program	Late Night with David Letterman	Won	"4th Anniversary Special"
1987	Outstanding Writing in a Variety Or Music Program	Late Night with David Letterman	Won	"5th Anniversary Special"
1988	Outstanding Writing in a Variety Or Music Program	Late Night with David Letterman	Nominated	"6th Anniversary Special"
1989	Outstanding Writing in a Variety Or Music Program	Late Night with David Letterman	Nominated	"7th Anniversary Special"
1990	Outstanding Writing in a Variety Or Music Program	Late Night with David Letterman	Nominated	"8th Anniversary Special

=== Screen Actors Guild Awards ===
Year	Category	Nominated work	Result
2020	Outstanding Performance by an Ensemble in a Comedy Series	Schitt's Creek	Nominated
2021	Outstanding Performance by an Ensemble in a Comedy Series	Schitt's Creek	Won

=== American Comedy Awards ===
Year	Category	Nominated work	Result
1994	Funniest Supporting Actor in a Motion Picture	Groundhog Day	Nominated
1999	Funniest Supporting Actor in a Motion Picture	There's Something About Mary	Nominated

=== Canadian Screen Awards ===
Year	Category	Nominated work	Result
2016	Best Performance by an Actor in a Featured Supporting Role or Guest Role in a Comedic Series	Schitt's Creek	Won
2019	Best Supporting or Guest Actor, Comedy	Schitt's Creek	Nominated
2020	Best Supporting Actor, Comedy	Schitt's Creek	Nominated
2021	Best Supporting Actor, Comedy	Schitt's Creek	Nominated
