= The Shroud of the Thwacker =

2005 novel by Chris Elliott

- First edition
- Author: Chris Elliott
- Language: English
- Genre: Novel
- Publisher: Miramax Books
- Publication date: 2005
- Publication place: United States
- Media type: Print (hardcover)
- Pages: 368 (US hardback)
- ISBN: 1-4013-5245-6
- OCLC: 61695984

The Shroud of the Thwacker is a 2005 novel written by American author Chris Elliott and published by the Miramax Books in the United States.

== See also ==
- Boilerplate (robot), a character featured in the novel
