= Bob Elliott (comedian) =

American comedian (1923–2016)

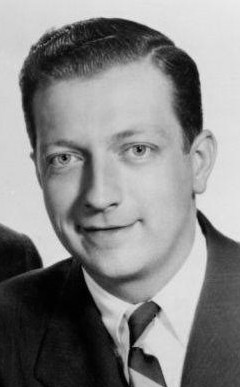
- Elliott on Monitor in 1960
- Born: Robert Brackett Elliott; March 26, 1923; Winchester, Massachusetts, U.S.
- Died: February 2, 2016 (aged 92); Cundy's Harbor, Maine, U.S.
- Occupations: Comedian, actor
- Years active: 1946–2008
- Spouses: Jane Underwood (m. 1943; div. 1953); Lee Peppers (m. 1954; died 2012)
- Children: 5; including Chris
- Relatives: Abby Elliott (granddaughter); Bridey Elliott (granddaughter)

Robert Brackett Elliott (March 26, 1923 – February 2, 2016) was an American comedian and actor, one-half of the comedy duo of Bob and Ray. He was the father of comedian/actor Chris Elliott and grandfather of actresses and comedians Abby Elliott and Bridey Elliott. He is most remembered for the character of radio reporter Wally Ballou.

== Life and career ==
Elliott was born in Winchester, Massachusetts, the son of Gail Marguarite (née Brackett), a needleworker, and Fred Russell Elliott, who worked in insurance. Bob Elliott served in the U.S. Army in Northern Europe during World War II. On radio, he appeared in programs with his long-time partner Ray Goulding. These were in different series and time slots over decades, beginning in the late 1940s at Boston's WHDH radio on the show Matinee with Bob and Ray.

"The funniest people in this country, these guys are also two of the keenest observers of the American scene and the finest interviewers in the business."

— David Letterman said of the duo prior to one interview.

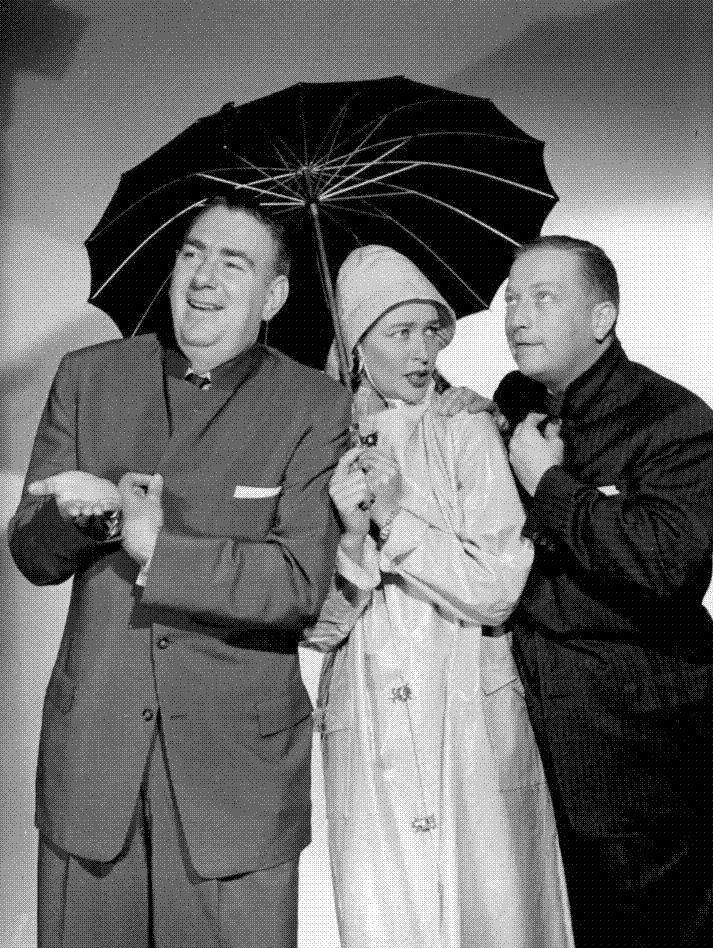
Bob and Ray in a publicity photo with Tedi Thurman for Monitor, where all were program regulars

On television, Elliott and Goulding hosted Bob and Ray from 1951 to 1953. He appeared on a number of other television programs, including Happy Days; Newhart; and Bob & Ray, Jane, Laraine & Gilda in 1979 (with Goulding, Jane Curtin, Laraine Newman and Gilda Radner); The David Steinberg Show; and Saturday Night Live. In 1982, Elliott was in Author! Author! as Patrick Dicker. He would star in made-for-TV-Movie's such as Between Time and Timbuktu and FDR: A One Man Show. Elliott also made television commercials, and co-wrote some humor articles with Ray Goulding for Mad Magazine in the 1950s.

In 1970, the duo debuted in The Two and Only on Broadway. Bob and Goulding worked together up until Goulding's death in 1990.

== Solo works ==
In 1990, Elliott portrayed a bank guard in Quick Change. In 1990, he portrayed "Fred Peterson" in the television series Get a Life, which starred Chris as his son. Four years later, the elder Elliott appeared in the Tim Burton production Cabin Boy, playing Chris's father again. In 2004, he appeared in a skit on the Air America radio program The O'Franken Factor. Elliott appeared on radio with Garrison Keillor in The American Radio Company of the Air.

== Personal life ==
Elliott married Jane Underwood in 1943. They divorced in 1953, having no children. Bob and Ray writer Raymond Knight died in 1953. In 1954, Elliott married Knight's widow, Lee (née Peppers). They were married for 58 years until her death in 2012. They had two sons, Chris Elliott and Bob Elliott Jr., and one daughter, Amy Andersen. They adopted Lee and Ray Knight's two children, Colony Elliott Santangelo and Shannon Elliott. They had 11 grandchildren and five great-grandchildren.

In 1989, Elliott co-authored son Chris's mock autobiography, Daddy's Boy: A Son's Shocking Account of Life with a Famous Father.

Elliott died in Cundy's Harbor, Maine, on February 2, 2016, from throat cancer at the age of 92.

== Filmography ==
=== Film ===
Year	Title	Role	Notes
1959	Test Dive Buddies	Bob	Short film directed by Ed Graham Jr.
1960	Kid Gloves	Bob	Short film directed by Ed Graham Jr.
1971	Cold Turkey	Hugh Upson/David Chetley/Sandy Van Andy	Satirical comedy film directed by Norman Lear.
1980	Vengeance	Luke	Directed and written by Bob Bliss.
1981	B.C.: A Special Christmas	Peter (voice)	American animated short film directed by Vlad Goetzelman.
1982	Author! Author!	Patrick Dicker	American comedy drama film directed by Arthur Hiller and written by Israel Horovitz.
1984	Kidco	Policeman #2	Comedy film directed by Ronald F. Maxwell.
1987	The Gnomes' Great Adventure	Fred	American animated film directed by Harvey Weinstein and released by Miramax Films.; Based on The World of David the Gnome.
1990	Quick Change	Bank Guard	Crime comedy film written by Howard Franklin, produced by and starring Bill Murray, and directed by both.; Despite not being a major commercial success, the film was well received critically.
1994	Cabin Boy	William Mayweather	Fantasy comedy film directed by Adam Resnick.; Hip-hop producer Dan "the Automator" Nakamura named his publishing company, Sharkman Music, after the film.

=== Television ===
Year	Title	Role	Notes
1951–53	Bob and Ray	Co-Host	15-minute television series on NBC.
1972	Between Time and Timbuktu	Bud Williams, Jr.	Made-for-TV-Movie; Directed by Fred Barzyk.; Based on a number of works by Kurt Vonnegut.
1976	The David Steinberg Show	Guest	Episode: "Episode #1.1 (Pilot)"
1978	Saturday Night Live	Interviewer	Episode: "Elliott Gould/Peter Tosh"
1979	Happy Days	Gil Crawford	Episode: "Here Comes the Bride, Again"
1981	The Steve Allen Comedy Hour	Guest	Episode: "Episode #1.22"
1985	Trapper John, M.D.	Zeke Rainey	Episode: "A False Start"
1986	Action Family	The Vendor	Made-for-TV-Movie; Directed by Gary Weis.
1987	FDR: A One Man Show	Make-Up Man	Made-for-TV-Movie; Directed by Matt Wickline.
1988	Coming of Age	Guest	Episode: "Hale to the Chief"
1988	Newhart	Bill Loudon	Episode: "I Came, I Saw, I Sat"
1990–92	Get a Life	Fred Peterson	Contract role
1999	LateLine	Wally Van Horn	Episode: "The Minister of Television"
2008	King of the Hill	Edgar Hornsby (voice)	Episode: "Square-Footed Monster" (final role)

Preceded by Dennis James	Host of The Name's the Same; April 11 – June 21, 1955; With: Ray Goulding	Succeeded by Clifton Fadiman
