= John Saunders =

John Saunders may refer to:

== Government ==
- John Saunders (English judge) (born 1949), English High Court Judge of the Queen's Bench Division
- John Saunders (MP) (1590–1638), English lawyer and politician, represented Reading in the House of Commons
- John Saunders (New Brunswick judge) (1754–1834), Canadian soldier, lawyer, and Chief Justice of the colonial Province of New Brunswick
- John R. Saunders (1869–1934), American lawyer and politician in Virginia

== Sports ==
- John Saunders (American football) (1950–2001), American football player
- John Saunders (chess player) (born 1953), British chess player, writer and magazine editor
- John Saunders (footballer, born Worksop) (1950–1998), English professional footballer
- John Saunders (footballer, born Newport) (born 1950), Welsh footballer who mostly played for Walsall F.C.
- John Saunders (jockey), Epsom Derby winning jockey in the 19th century
- John Saunders (cricketer), South African-born English cricketer and academic

== Music ==
- John Saunders (musician) (1867–1919), British violinist who led the Royal Philharmonic Society's orchestra
- John Baker Saunders (1954–1999), founding member and bassist for the American group Mad Season

== Science and health ==
- John Cunningham Saunders (1773–1810), British ophthalmologist
- John Saunders (dentist) (1891–1961), New Zealand dentist and public health administrator
- John W. Saunders Jr., American scientist

== Writers ==
- John Saunders, pseudonym of the British Western fiction novelist Arthur Nickson (1902–1974)
- John Saunders (journalist) (1955–2016), Canadian-American sports journalist
- John Monk Saunders (1897–1940), American novelist, screenwriter and movie director

== Fictional characters ==
- John Saunders (Home and Away), fictional character on the Australian soap opera Home and Away

== Others ==
- Jake Saunders or Sir John Saunders (1917–2002), chairman of the Hong Kong and Shanghai Banking Corporation
- John Saunders, former artistic director of the forerunner to Barking Gecko Theatre Company
- John Joseph Saunders (1910–1972), British medieval historian
- John P. Saunders, British police officer killed by the Indian revolutionaries Bhagat Singh and Shivaram Rajguru

== See also ==
- Jonathan Saunders (born 1977), Scottish fashion designer
- Jonny Saunders (born 1975), British sports radio broadcaster
- John Sanders (disambiguation)
- Jack Saunders (disambiguation)
