= Skellington Productions =

Defunct film production company

- Formerly: Selick/Burton Projects; (1985–1988); Selick Projects; (1988–1992)
- Type: Joint venture
- Industry: Entertainment
- Founded: 1985; 41 years ago
- Founders: Henry Selick; Tim Burton
- Defunct: 1998; 28 years ago
- Fate: Merged with Tim Burton Productions and absorbed into Walt Disney Pictures
- Successor: Tim Burton Productions; Walt Disney Pictures
- Headquarters: 500 S. Buena Vista Street, Burbank, California, United States
- Production output: Stop motion
- Parent: Walt Disney Feature Animation

Skellington Productions was an American animation studio and production company that was a joint venture between Walt Disney Feature Animation and directors Henry Selick and Tim Burton. The company specialized in stop motion animation and made use of the art in its two films. The studio's last work was season one of KaBlam!, after which it was closed by Disney.

== History ==
After Tim Burton directed his directorial debut, Pee-wee's Big Adventure, he and Henry Selick formed the company in 1985 as Selick/Burton Projects, where Burton could direct episodes of Alfred Hitchcock Presents and Shelley Duvall's Faerie Tale Theatre, while Henry Selick could focus on doing animation. In 1988, Tim Burton left to work on Beetlejuice, and Selick renamed the studio to Selick Projects. During this period, Selick Projects produced commercials for MTV, Ritz, and Pillsbury.

In September 1992, Tim Burton returned to Selick's studio, renamed it Skellington Productions, and sold it to Disney. The first film produced by Skellington Productions (which gave the company its namesake), The Nightmare Before Christmas, was released theatrically in 1993 under Disney's Touchstone Pictures banner to a positive reception and a successful box office, becoming a sleeper hit. Since 2006, Nightmare has been released by Walt Disney Pictures and in Disney Digital 3-D format.

Three months later, Disney released Skellington's second feature, Cabin Boy, starring Chris Elliott and directed by screenwriter, Adam Resnick. Tim Burton was a fan of the show Get a Life and commissioned Elliott and Resnick to write him a screenplay. When Burton received the script, he liked it very much and was going to direct it. At last minute, Burton got an offer to direct Ed Wood instead, so Burton jumped ship from Cabin Boy and handed the directing duties to Resnick, who had never directed anything in his life. When the film was released on January 7, 1994, the reception was overwhelmingly negative and was a huge flop at the box office. This film affected both Chris Elliott and Adam Resnick's careers for a long while.

Skellington's third and final film, James and the Giant Peach, based on the classic children's novel by Roald Dahl, was released to theaters in 1996. Disney closed Skellington after the film became a box office flop despite positive reviews.

Aside from film, Skellington Productions also produced the Life with Loopy segments of Nickelodeon's TV series KaBlam! for its first season. Production on Life with Loopy moved to Custer Avenue Stages after Disney closed Skellington.

== Logo ==
The studio's original logo is a skeleton of a human hand, a clear reference to Jack Skellington, the title character of The Nightmare Before Christmas.

== Filmography ==
Year	Title	Co-production with	Distributor	Notes
1993	The Nightmare Before Christmas	Touchstone Pictures	Buena Vista Pictures Distribution	
1994	Cabin Boy	Touchstone Pictures	Buena Vista Pictures Distribution	
1996	James and the Giant Peach	Walt Disney Pictures; Allied Filmmakers	Buena Vista Pictures Distribution	The last film to be made from the studio
1996	KaBlam!	Nickelodeon Animation Studios	MTV Networks	Life with Loopy (season 1 only)

=== Canceled films ===
Title	Notes
Frankenstein	
Trick or Treat	
Toots and the Upside Down House	

== See also ==
- List of Disney theatrical animated features
- List of animation studios owned by The Walt Disney Company
