= Ritch Brinkley =

American character actor

- Brinkley in Doctor Mordrid, 1992
- Born: March 18, 1944; Colorado City, Texas, U.S.
- Died: November 5, 2015 (aged 71); Raleigh, North Carolina, U.S.
- Occupation: Actor
- Years active: 1972–2002

Ritch Brinkley (March 18, 1944 – November 5, 2015) was an American character actor who appeared in over 50 films and television programs in a career that spanned three decades. He was best known for playing William in Beauty and the Beast and as cameraman Carl Wishnitski in American sitcom television series Murphy Brown, as well as for roles in films such as Cabin Boy (1994) and Breakdown.

Brinkley died on November 5, 2015, at the age of 71.

== Filmography ==
Film

Year	Title	Role	Notes
1972	Curse of the Headless Horseman	Ritch	
1980	Brubaker	Gate Guard	
1984	Rhinestone	Luke	
1985	The Man with One Red Shoe	Hulse	
1988	Big Business	Mayor Bill Finker	
1990	Book of Love	Moving Van Driver	
1992	Ruby	Attorney Howard	
1992	Doctor Mordrid	Gunner	
1994	Cabin Boy	Captain Greybar	
1997	Breakdown	Al	
1997	Cyclops, Baby	Bait	
2002	Children on Their Birthdays	Acey Trump	(final film role)

Television

Year	Title	Role	Notes
1976	Great Performances	Frontiersman	Episode: "The Patriots"
1984	The Dukes of Hazzard	Starkey	Episode: "Play It Again, Luke"
1984	The Master	Ralph Carter	Episode: "State of the Union"
1984	Mama's Family	Bert Wembly	Episode: "Mama's Birthday"
1984	Hill Street Blues	Prison Doctor	Episode: "Watt a Way to Go"
1984	Falcon Crest	Mr. Tower	Episode: "Shadows"
1985	Scarecrow and Mrs. King	Guro of Cosmic Love	Episode: "Over the Limit"
1985	Wild Horses (1985 film)	Wedge Smithfield	TV movie
1985	Night Court	Biker	Episode: "Dan's Boss"
1985	Misfits of Science	Bart	Episode: "Twin Engines"
1986	The Defiant Ones	Lonny	TV movie
1986	The Garry Shandling Show: 25th Anniversary Special	Cowboy	TV special
1986	The Twilight Zone	Middle-Aged Man (segment "Dead Run")	Episode: "The Leprechaun-Artist/Dead Run"
1986	Stingray (1985 TV series)	Westcott	Episode: "Ancient Eyes"
1986	1st & Ten (1984 TV series)	Otto	Episode: "Quarterbacks Tell No Tales"
1986	Manhunt for Claude Dallas	Judge Lodge	TV movie
1986	Houston: The Legend of Texas	Sen. Buckley	TV movie
1986	Amazing Stories (1985 TV series)	Mayor Chestor A. Barnsworth	Episode: "The Pumpkin Competition"
1987	Mathnet	Jasper Stoutman	Episode: "The Mystery of the Maltese Pigeon"
1987	Newhart	Farmer Bagley	Episode: "Jail, Jail, the Gang's All Here"
1987	Timestalkers	Barman	TV movie
1987	My Sister Sam	Dan	Episode: "Exposed"
1987-1988	Dolly (TV series)	Charlie Boil	9 episodes
1988	My Two Dads	Truck	Episode: "Nicole's Big Adventure"
1988	Blue Skies (1988 TV series)	Fred	Episode: "Something Old, Something New"
1988	Something Is Out There	Maxie	Episode: "In His Own Image"
1990	Normal Life (TV series)	Burt	Episode: "P.O.V."
1988-1990	Beauty and the Beast (1987 TV series)	William	15 episodes
1990	Twin Peaks	D.A. Daryl Lodwick	2 episodes
1990	Silhouette	Gene the Mechanic	TV movie
1991	Shades of LA	Actor	Episode: "Cross the Center Line"
1991	Get a Life (American TV series)	Dick	Episode: "The Construction Worker Show"
1991	Jailbirds (1991 film)	Beetle	TV movie
1991	Cast a Deadly Spell	Owl Wagon Manager	TV movie
1992	FBI: The Untold Stories	Actor	Episode: "Claude Dallas"
1992	Parker Lewis Can't Lose	Wiley	Episode: "Jerry's Journey"
1992	The Edge (Fox TV series)	Santa Claus	Episode #1.11
1993	Lois & Clark: The New Adventures of Superman	Stan	Episode: "Neverending Battle"
1994	Burke's Law	Zach Warmly	Episode: "Who Killed the Fashion King?"
1994	Dead Man's Revenge	Valdez Sheriff	TV movie
1994	Thunder Alley (TV series)	Walter	8 episodes
1994	Something Wilder	Vince	Episode: "Love Native American Style"
1995	Virus (1995 film)	Restaurant Host	TV movie
1995	Amanda & the Alien	Bubba the Truck Driver	TV movie
1995	Walker, Texas Ranger	Sheriff Nathan Decker	Episode: "The Lynching"
1995	Saved by the Bell: The New Class	Grandpa Eddie Powers / Grandpa Ernie Powers	3 episodes
1996	Malcolm & Eddie	Dan	Episode: "Big Brother is Watching"
1996	The Jeff Foxworthy Show	Santa Claus	Episode: "Merry Christmas, Y'All"
1988-1997	Murphy Brown	Carl Wishnitski	28 episodes
1998	Honey, I Shrunk the Kids: The TV Show	Schmorg	Episode: "Honey, Meet the Barbarians"
1995 & 1998	Weird Science (TV series)	Baldash Stuart Donnelly / Mr. Cabeza	2 episodes
1998	Maggie (1998 TV series)	Dr. Babcock	Episode: "Ballad of Maggie Day"
1999	Sabrina the Teenage Witch (1996 TV series)	50 Year Old Man	Episode: "The Long and Winding Short Cut"
