= 1896 Minor Counties Championship =

- Cricket format: 2 days
- Tournament format(s): League system
- Champions: Worcestershire (1st title)
- Participants: 13
- Matches: 37
- Most runs: Harry Foster (550 for Worcestershire)
- Most wickets: George Nash (65 for Buckinghamshire)

The 1896 Minor Counties Championship was the second running of the Minor Counties Cricket Championship, and ran from 25 May to 29 August 1896. Worcestershire won their first outright title, having shared the previous year's championship. Buckinghamshire were runners-up and were the only other team to win more games than they lost. Thirteen teams competed in the championship, down one from the previous year. Bedfordshire, Cheshire and Lincolnshire were absent, while Glamorgan and Northumberland made their Minor Counties Championship debuts.

The leading run-scorer, Harry Foster, who played for Worcestershire, was the only batsman to score more than one century over the course of the season. The leading wicket-taker, Buckinghamshire's George Nash, took the two largest match wicket hauls of the season: 14/100 and 12/102 against Northamptonshire and Oxfordshire, respectively.

== Table ==
- One point was awarded for a win, and one point was taken away for each loss. Final placings were decided by dividing the number of points earned by the number of completed matches (i.e. those that ended in a win or a loss), and multiplying by 100.

Team	Pld	W	L	D	A	Pts	Fin	%Fin
Worcestershire	9	6	1	2	0	5	7	71.43
Buckinghamshire	8	4	1	3	0	3	5	60.00
Durham ‡	4	1	1	2	0	0	2	0.00
Hertfordshire	8	2	2	4	0	0	4	0.00
Northamptonshire	8	2	2	4	0	0	4	0.00
Northumberland	8	2	2	4	0	0	4	0.00
Wiltshire ‡	4	1	1	2	0	0	2	0.00
Berkshire	8	1	2	5	0	–1	3	–33.33
Oxfordshire	8	1	3	3	1	–2	4	–50.00
Glamorgan ‡	1	0	1	0	0	–1	1	–100.00
Norfolk ‡	4	0	3	1	0	–3	3	–100.00
Staffordshire ‡	2	0	1	1	0	–1	1	–100.00
Cambridgeshire ‡	2	0	0	1	1	0	0	—

Notes

- denotes the Champion team(s).
- ‡ denotes a team that failed to play the minimum of eight matches. These teams are sometimes omitted from the table altogether.

== Averages ==
Most runs
Aggregate	Average	Player	County
550	45.83	Harry Foster	Worcestershire
450	32.14	George Colson	Northamptonshire
365	33.18	Jack Saunders	Buckinghamshire
343	28.58	Charles Nepean	Berkshire
336	25.84	George Thompson	Northamptonshire

Most wickets
Aggregate	Average	Player	County
65	11.01	George Nash	Buckinghamshire
53	9.18	Ted Arnold	Worcestershire
47	15.78	George Thompson	Northamptonshire
45	10.42	Billie Barker	Berkshire
43	13.34	Brusher Rogers	Oxfordshire
