= List of Get a Life episodes =

This is an episode list of the Fox television series Get a Life. The series starred Chris Elliott as Chris Peterson, a 30-year-old paperboy who still lives with his parents (portrayed by Elinor Donahue and Elliott's real-life dad Bob Elliott). Also starring was Sam Robards as Chris' best friend Larry, Robin Riker as Larry's wife (and Chris' main antagonist) Sharon, and Brian Doyle-Murray as Chris' surly second-season landlord Gus.

== Series overview ==
Season	Episodes	Originally released	
Season	Episodes	First released	Last released
1	22	September 23, 1990	May 19, 1991
2	13	November 9, 1991	March 8, 1992

== Episodes ==
=== Unaired pilot (1990) ===
No. overall	No. in season	Title	Directed by	Written by	Original release date
1	1	"Unaired Pilot"	David Mirkin	Chris Elliott & David Mirkin & Adam Resnick	Unaired
The unaired pilot is the same as the first episode "Terror on the Hell Loop 2000", except that Gladys Peterson is played by June Lockhart. The song "Roam" plays during the end credits.

=== Season 1 (1990–91) ===
No. overall	No. in season	Title	Directed by	Written by	Original release date
1	1	"Terror on the Hell Loop 2000"	David Mirkin	Chris Elliott & David Mirkin & Adam Resnick	September 23, 1990
Chris talks his best friend Larry into taking the day off from his job so they can go to the amusement park and ride the new Hell Loop 2000, a 360-degree looped rollercoaster. However the fun ends when they get stuck upside down at the top of the loop. Julie Brown guest stars as TV reporter Connie Bristol. The opening theme is before and after the pilot.
2	2	"The Prettiest Week of My Life"	David Mirkin	Adam Resnick & Chris Elliott	September 30, 1990
Chris decides to enter the exciting world of male modeling when he joins the Handsome Boy School of Modeling. Brian Doyle-Murray guest stars as Ted Bains.
3	3	"Dadicus"	Tony Dow	Marjorie Gross	October 7, 1990
Chris convinces his father to accompany him to the father-son competition at the annual newspaper boy picnic. James Hampton guest stars.
4	4	"A Family Affair"	Dwayne Hickman	Ian Gurvitz	October 14, 1990
Sharon's sister comes to visit and she is taken with Chris' charm, much to Sharon's chagrin.
5	5	"Pile of Death"	Peter Baldwin	Adam Resnick & Chris Elliott	October 21, 1990
In order to raise money to help save his childhood playground, Chris attempts to set a world record by having the most things piled on top of him.
6	6	"Paperboy 2000"	Peter Baldwin	Adam Markowitz & Bill Freiberger	November 4, 1990
Chris and the other paper boys lose their jobs when the newspaper replaces them with the Paperboy 2000, a gigantic paper-delivering robotic vehicle. To get everyone's job back, Chris challenges Paperboy 2000 to a paper-delivering contest.
7	7	"Driver's License"	David Mirkin	David Mirkin	November 11, 1990
Chris becomes infatuated with a new waitress at the local diner (Anastasia Barzee) and wants to take her out on a date, but she'll only go if he takes her on a drive around town. However, Chris never got a driver's license and tries to keep that fact a secret when he "borrows" his dad's car for his date.
8	8	"The Sitting"	David Steinberg	Miguel Furman & Marjorie Gross & Adam Resnick	November 18, 1990
Chris becomes a house sitter in an old Victorian house that appears to be haunted.
9	9	"Bored Straight"	David Mirkin	Marjorie Gross	December 2, 1990
While delivering papers in the bad side of town, Chris meets a group of young hoodlums and he decides to "take back the streets" by helping the kids.
10	10	"Zoo Animals on Wheels"	Peter Baldwin	Adam Resnick	December 16, 1990
Much to Sharon's dismay, Chris auditions for and gets the lead part in a local community theatre production of Andrew Todd Keller's musical "Zoo Animals on Wheels" (a parody of the Andrew Lloyd Webber musicals "Cats" and "Starlight Express").
11	11	"Roots"	Dwayne Hickman	Adam Markowitz & Bill Freiberger	January 6, 1991
Chris finds evidence that makes him think he is adopted, so he sets off to find his natural parents, an Amish couple. When he finds them, they are even less prepared for Chris' bizarre behavior than Fred and Gladys.
12	12	"The Counterfeit Watch Story"	David Mirkin	Adam Resnick	February 3, 1991
Chris goes to work for the police in a sting operation after he buys a counterfeit watch, the Chronosynch 2000.
13	13	"Chris vs. Donald"	Dwayne Hickman	Adam Resnick	February 10, 1991
At the annual Peterson family reunion, Chris is still struggling to get out from under the shadow of his more successful cousin Donald (Jackie Earle Haley).
14	14	"Chris Wins a Celebrity"	Dean Parisot	Adam Resnick	February 24, 1991
Chris wins a contest, where his favorite talk show host will spend a weekend at his place. The squalor of the Elliott residence makes the host try to get out of the contest, until Chris gets him in on some of his fun activities. However, after enjoying some of Chris' zany antics, the host says he is through with Hollywood, to Chris' regret. Martin Mull guest stars.
15	15	"Houseboy 2000"	Peter Baldwin	Marjorie Gross	March 10, 1991
After destroying her kitchen, Chris becomes Sharon's slave to work off the $2,000 in damage.
16	16	"Married"	David Mirkin	David Mirkin	March 24, 1991
In the span of one day, Chris meets his soulmate (Deborah Shelton), marries her and goes through an entire relationship with her.
17	17	"Camping 2000"	Dean Parisot	Steve Pepoon	March 31, 1991
Chris and Larry join Chris' dad Fred on a camping trip. When Fred manages to lose them, the hungry boys eat some berries that cause them to hallucinate.
18	18	"The Construction Worker Show"	David Mirkin	Adam Resnick	April 7, 1991
Chris becomes a construction worker with the men who are renovating his parents' kitchen. When they tell him one of their trade secrets, Chris has a problem with their dishonesty.
19	19	"The Big City"	Peter Baldwin	Marjorie Gross	April 21, 1991
During a visit to "The Big City" (somehow set in the 1940s or 1950s) that resembles New York City, Chris believes his wallet was stolen after he was slipped a "mickey". Chris soon becomes a celebrity known affectionately in the City as "Walletboy".
20	20	"Neptune 2000"	David Mirkin	Steve Pepoon	April 28, 1991
When Chris was 12 he got a job as a paperboy so he could buy a submarine from an ad in the back of a comic book. Chris and his father put it together. However, when they embark on the sub's maiden voyage (in Chris's bathtub), they become trapped.
21	21	"The One Where Chris and Larry Switch Lives"	David Mirkin	Edd Hall	May 12, 1991
After stealing an arrowhead from an Indian burial ground, Chris and Larry become cursed and wind up switching lives. Chris then has 24 hours to return the arrowhead or suffer the fate of being married to Sharon forever.
22	22	"Psychic 2000"	David Mirkin	David Mirkin	May 19, 1991
Chris has a near-death experience after choking on cereal and is endowed with prescience. However he becomes worried when one of his visions is of Sharon being murdered.

=== Season 2 (1991–92) ===
No. overall	No. in season	Title	Directed by	Written by	Original release date
23	1	"Chris Moves Out"	David Mirkin	Adam Resnick & David Mirkin	November 9, 1991
Chris turns 31 and decides it's time to move out, so he goes in search of a new place to live and moves into Gus' garage.
24	2	"Larry on the Loose"	David Mirkin	Bob Odenkirk	November 16, 1991
Larry takes off after listening to Chris reminding him of everything wrong with his life. Chris goes in search of Larry and when he fails, he goes in search of a new best friend. Larry Potter's last episode of the series.
25	3	"Meat Locker 2000"	David Mirkin	Jace Richdale	November 23, 1991
Chris and Sharon show their true feelings when they become trapped in a meat locker together.
26	4	"Health Inspector 2000"	Dean Parisot	Steve Pepoon	November 30, 1991
After finding a dead rat in his carton of milk, Chris decides to become a food inspector.
27	5	"Chris Gets His Tonsils Out"	David Mirkin	Eileen Conn & Andrew Gordon	December 7, 1991
Chris must deal with the fact he is ready to undergo "major" surgery and he begins by trying to make peace with Sharon.
28	6	"Prisoner of Love"	David Mirkin	Charlie Kaufman	December 14, 1991
When his pen-pal gets released from prison, she comes to stay with Chris. She takes him hostage when the police come after her when she starts criminal activities under Chris' nose. Nora Dunn guest stars. This is the last episode with Fred and Gladys Peterson.
29	7	"Chris Becomes a Male Escort"	John Fortenberry	Adam Resnick	December 21, 1991
Chris decides on a whim to become a male escort, hoping for free plays and dates with young women. What he gets is an elderly woman who is hard up.
30	8	"Girlfriend 2000"	David Mirkin	David Mirkin	January 12, 1992
After getting hit by her car, Chris falls for (and stalks) a doctor; later, while stalking her, he starts getting stalked by the girl from the drugstore who has fallen for him. Emma Samms and Amy Yasbeck guest star.
31	9	"Chris' Brain Starts Working"	John Fortenberry	Steve Pepoon	January 19, 1992
Exposure to toxic waste found under Gus' house turns Chris into a genius, and with Gus he proceeds to enter and win spelling bees.
32	10	"Bad Fish"	David Mirkin	Bob Odenkirk	February 2, 1992
After eating bad shellfish, Sharon and Gus get amnesia, and Chris seizes the opportunity to convince them that they are his best friends.
33	11	"SPEWEY and Me"	David Mirkin	Jace Richdale	February 9, 1992
When an alien crashes in Gus' front yard, Chris tries to keep it from the government, but this alien is nothing like E.T. or ALF.
34	12	"1977 2000"	David Mirkin	Charlie Kaufman	March 1, 1992
Chris time travels to save Gus' career as a law enforcement officer, however, he soon discovers the trouble with messing with the past which includes two-headed zombies named Sharon.
35	13	"Clip Show"	David Mirkin	David Mirkin	March 8, 1992
In this clip show, while on his first jet airplane flight, Chris falls out, and is disappointed when his life flashes before his eyes and it only covers the past eighteen months. He survives the fall when he unexpectedly lands on a bed, but then the bed turns out to be made of explosives and blows him up.
