= Tim Burton Productions =

American film and television production company

- Type: Private
- Industry: Entertainment
- Founded: 1985; 41 years ago
- Founder: Tim Burton
- Headquarters: Burbank, California, United States
- Key people: Tim Burton (president); Denise Di Novi (president)
- Products: Motion pictures, television
- Owner: Tim Burton
- Divisions: Burton Projects; Skellington Productions (formerly)

Tim Burton Productions is an American film and television production company founded by Tim Burton in the mid-1980s. Denise Di Novi once headed the banner from 1989 to 1996. The company was not usually credited on films directed or produced by Burton.

== Filmography ==
=== Films ===
Title	U.S. release date	Director(s)	Co-production companies	Distributor
Edward Scissorhands	December 7, 1990	Tim Burton	—N/a	20th Century Fox
Batman Returns	June 19, 1992	Tim Burton	Warner Bros. Pictures, DC Comics, Polygram Pictures	Warner Bros. Pictures
The Nightmare Before Christmas	October 29, 1993	Henry Selick	Touchstone Pictures, (Note: The Nightmare Before Christmas was reissued as a Walt Disney Pictures release in 2006.) Skellington Productions	Buena Vista Pictures Distribution
Cabin Boy	January 7, 1994	Adam Resnick	Touchstone Pictures, Skellington Productions	Buena Vista Pictures Distribution
Ed Wood	September 30, 1994	Tim Burton	Touchstone Pictures	Buena Vista Pictures Distribution
Batman Forever	June 16, 1995	Joel Schumacher	Warner Bros. Pictures, DC Comics, PolyGram Pictures	Warner Bros. Pictures
James and the Giant Peach	April 12, 1996	Henry Selick	Walt Disney Pictures, Allied Filmmakers, Skellington Productions	Buena Vista Pictures Distribution
Mars Attacks!	December 13, 1996	Tim Burton	—N/a	Warner Bros. Pictures
Sleepy Hollow	November 17, 1999	Tim Burton	Paramount Pictures, Mandalay Pictures, Scott Rudin Productions, American Zoetrope	Paramount Pictures
Big Fish	December 10, 2003	Tim Burton	Columbia Pictures, Jinks/Cohen Company, The Zanuck Company	Sony Pictures Releasing
Charlie and the Chocolate Factory	July 17, 2005	Tim Burton	Village Roadshow Pictures, The Zanuck Company, Plan B Entertainment, The Roald Dahl Story Co., Theobald Film Productions	Warner Bros. Pictures
Corpse Bride	September 23, 2005	Mike Johnson; Tim Burton	Laika, Patalex II Productions	Warner Bros. Pictures
9	September 9, 2009	Shane Acker	Focus Features, Relativity Media, Lux Animation	Focus Features
Alice in Wonderland	March 5, 2010	Tim Burton	Walt Disney Pictures, Roth Films, The Zanuck Company, Team Todd	Walt Disney Studios Motion Pictures
Abraham Lincoln: Vampire Hunter	June 22, 2012	Timur Bekmambetov	Bazelevs Company, Dune Entertainment	20th Century Fox
Frankenweenie	October 5, 2012	Tim Burton	Walt Disney Pictures	Walt Disney Studios Motion Pictures
Big Eyes	December 25, 2014	Tim Burton	Electric City Entertainment, Silverwood Films	The Weinstein Company
Alice Through the Looking Glass	May 27, 2016	James Bobin	Walt Disney Pictures, Roth Films, Team Todd	Walt Disney Studios Motion Pictures
Dumbo	March 29, 2019	Tim Burton	Walt Disney Pictures, Infinite Detective Productions, Secret Machine Entertainment	Walt Disney Studios Motion Pictures
Beetlejuice Beetlejuice	September 6, 2024	Tim Burton	Warner Bros. Pictures, The Geffen Company, Plan B Entertainment	Warner Bros. Pictures
Upcoming
Attack of the 50 Foot Woman	TBA	Tim Burton	Warner Bros. Pictures, LuckyChap Entertainment	Warner Bros. Pictures
Untitled animated film	TBA	Tim Burton	TBA	TBA

=== Television ===
Title	Years aired in U.S.	Creator(s)	Co-production companies	Distributor(s)	Network
Beetlejuice	1989–91	Tim Burton	Nelvana Limited, The Geffen Film Company, Warner Bros. Television	Warner Bros. Television Distribution	ABC; Fox
Family Dog	1993	Brad Bird	Amblin Television, Warner Bros. Television, Universal Television, Nelvana Limited	Warner Bros. Television Distribution; NBCUniversal Television Distribution	CBS
Wednesday	2022–present	Alfred Gough; Miles Millar	MGM Television, Millar Gough Ink, Toluca Pictures	Netflix Streaming Services	Netflix
