= Jon Sanders (disambiguation) =

Jon Sanders (born 1939) is an Australian yachtsman.

Jon Sanders may also refer to:

- Jon Sanders (director) (born 1943), British film director

== See also ==
- John Sanders (disambiguation)
- Jonathan Sanders (died 2015), Black man killed while being restrained by police in Stonewall, Mississippi, U.S.
