= John Sanders =

John Sanders may refer to:

- John Sanders (architect) (1768–1826), British architect
- John Sanders (sportscaster) (1943–2026), American sports broadcaster
- John Adams Sanders (1866–1948), justice of the Supreme Court of Nevada
- John C. C. Sanders (1840–1864), general in the Confederate States Army
- John Oswald Sanders (1902–1992), New Zealand lawyer, author and general director of Overseas Missionary Fellowship
- John Sanders (musician) (1933–2003), British organist, conductor, choir trainer and composer
- John E. Sanders (born 1956), American evangelical Christian theologian
- John Sanders (baseball) (1945–2022), American baseball player and coach
- John Sanders (painter) (1750–1825), English painter
- John "Deac" Sanders (born 1950), American football player
- John Holloway Sanders (1825–1884), architect based in England
- John Sanders, owner and perhaps painter of the Sanders portrait of William Shakespeare (1603)

== See also ==
- Jon Sanders (disambiguation)
- Johnny Sanders (disambiguation)
- John Saunders (disambiguation)
