= Cabin Boy =

1994 American fantasy comedy film

- Theatrical release poster
- Directed by: Adam Resnick
- Screenplay by: Adam Resnick
- Story by: Chris Elliott; Adam Resnick
- Produced by: Denise Di Novi; Tim Burton
- Starring: Chris Elliott; Ritch Brinkley; Brian Doyle-Murray; James Gammon; Brion James; Melora Walters
- Cinematography: Steve Yaconelli
- Edited by: Jon Poll
- Music by: Steve Bartek
- Production companies: Touchstone Pictures; Tim Burton Productions; Skellington Productions
- Distributed by: Buena Vista Pictures Distribution
- Release date: January 7, 1994
- Running time: 80 minutes
- Country: United States
- Language: English
- Budget: $10 million
- Box office: $3.7 million

Cabin Boy is a 1994 American fantasy comedy film directed by Adam Resnick in his directorial debut. The film stars Chris Elliott as Nathaniel Mayweather, a self-centered, arrogant snob who mistakenly boards a fishing boat that takes him on a fantastical sea adventure as he attempts to reroute it to Hawaii.

Elliott and Resnick developed the film for Tim Burton to direct. However, Burton subsequently chose to direct Ed Wood instead, though he remained attached as co-producer alongside Denise Di Novi.

Although expectations for the film were high, due to the attachment of Burton's name, it was poorly received by critics and audiences alike, becoming a box-office bomb. It has since gained a cult following through home video.

== Plot ==
Nathaniel Mayweather is a snobbish, self-centered, arrogant, virginal "fancy lad." After graduation, he is invited by his father to sail to Hawaii aboard The Queen Catherine. After annoying the limousine driver who is taking him to board the boat, he is forced to walk the rest of the way.

Nathaniel makes a wrong turn into a small fishing village where he meets the imbecilic cabin boy/first mate Kenny of The Filthy Whore, which Nathaniel believes to be The Queen Catherine as part of a theme. The next morning, Captain Greybar finds Nathaniel in his room and explains that the boat will not return to dry land for three months. Nathaniel unsuccessfully tries to convince each fisherman to set sail to Hawaii, but convinces Kenny into doing so. However, the crew reaches Hell's Bucket, a Bermuda Triangle-like area where strange events occur. The ship is caught in a fierce storm and Kenny is knocked overboard and drowns. With only one island in the entire area, the crew decide to set sail there. Without a cabin boy, Greybar forces Nathaniel to do the chores in return for taking him to Hawaii, as well as teaching him how to become a better person.

After failing all the chores he is assigned, the fishermen decide to give Nathaniel another chore that involves dragging him on a floating raft for a week. Nathaniel quickly runs out of supplies, begins consuming salt water, and suffers extreme sunburn after confusing cooking oil as lotion. He also realizes he might be going insane after sighting Kenny's ghost and seeing a floating cupcake that spits tobacco. After falling into the water he is saved by a shark-man. After nine days, Nathaniel is pulled back in and tells what happened. It is revealed by Skunk and Big Teddy that the shark-man is known as Chocki, the offspring of a male Viking and female shark.

Nathaniel spots a beautiful young woman named Trina swimming in the ocean. After she is pulled up in a net, Nathaniel becomes smitten with her. Not pleased with another passenger on board, the fishermen decide to strand Trina and Nathaniel on the island they're sailing toward. Finally reaching the island, the crew searches for components to fix their boat. Nathaniel tries to get closer to Trina, who constantly rejects him.

Greybar and Skunk suggest to Nathaniel that a blue-skinned, six-armed woman named Calli can help build his confidence. After an encounter with Calli that results in his first sexual experience, Nathaniel again meets Trina, who becomes attracted to him immediately. Calli's husband Mulligan, a giant, comes home to find a man's bag. Realizing what Calli has done, Mulligan decides to find her lover and kill him. Nathaniel tries to save everyone by confessing to the giant he's the one who slept with Calli. Mulligan is about to kill Nathaniel with a giant nail clipper when Chocki saves him. Nathaniel then kills Mulligan by choking him with his own belt.

Finally reaching Hawaii, Nathaniel offers his newfound companions a job at the hotel where his father is the owner, which they refuse. They tell Nathaniel he's a fancy lad who should stay in Hawaii with his dad where he belongs. Nathaniel and the fishermen part ways, including Trina. His equally-snobbish father, William Mayweather, condemns his son's actions. Seeing through his father how snobbish he used to be before boarding The Filthy Whore, Nathaniel leaves to find Trina. They then both join the crew on The Filthy Whore.

== Cast ==
- Chris Elliott as Nathaniel Mayweather
- Ritch Brinkley as Captain Greybar
- Brian Doyle-Murray as Skunk
- James Gammon as Pappy
- Brion James as Teddy "Big Teddy"
- Melora Walters as Trina
- Ann Magnuson as Calli
- Russ Tamblyn as Chocki
- Ricki Lake as Figurehead
- Andy Richter as Kenny
- Mike Starr as Mulligan the Giant
- I.M. Hobson as Headmaster Timmons
- Alfred Molina as The Professor
- Alex Nevil as Thomas
- David Sterry as Lance
- Bob Elliott as William Mayweather
- Edward Flotard as Limo Driver
- Jim Cummings as the Floating Cupcake (voice)
- Earl Hofert (alias of David Letterman) as Old Salt in Fishing Village

== Production ==
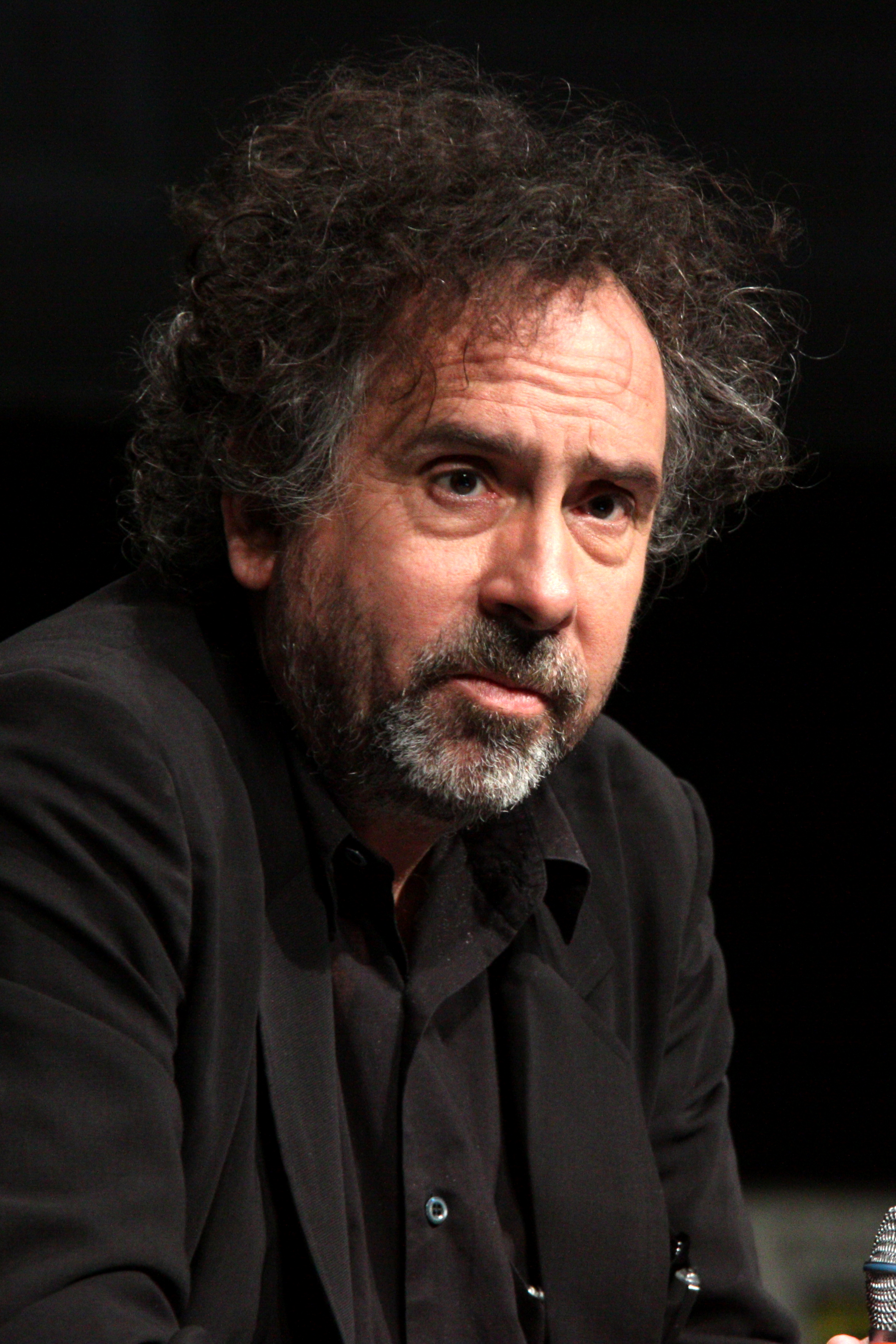
Tim Burton, who produced the film, was originally attached to direct Cabin Boy.

=== Development ===
Tim Burton contacted Chris Elliott and Adam Resnick after having seen their Fox series Get a Life, a surreal sitcom filled with anti-humor. Burton wanted to "return to his whimsical roots" and make a comedy in line with his debut, Pee-wee's Big Adventure, and tasked Elliott and Resnick to write a "Boy's Adventure" film in line with the Pee-wee Herman films as a vehicle for Elliott to star in.

During their conversations with Burton, Elliott suggested making a sea adventure, later citing as influences on the script the book Aku-Aku by Thor Heyerdahl and the film Captain's Courageous (1937). Elliott and Resnick filled their script with non sequitur humor, jokes that were "indifferent to anything but [their] own need to confuse".

=== Filming ===
Burton dropped out as director after receiving an offer to direct the biopic Ed Wood. Because he loved the Cabin Boy script, he remained attached as a co-producer with Denise Di Novi. Burton recommended Resnick—who had never directed a feature film before—to take over as director, an offer Resnick reluctantly accepted. However, due to Burton's departure, Touchstone Pictures drastically reduced the film's budget, and many scenes that had been requested by Burton had to be either altered or deleted to accommodate the new production costs.

Despite his own misgivings about his directing due to his inexperience, actress Melora Walters, who was cast as the female lead, said that Resnick did a good job directing, saying that Resnick showed a clear vision in his casting choices, and she later remembered that she had to audition multiple times before she was cast. Elliott and Resnick's former Late Night employer, David Letterman, acted in a cameo role.

== Release ==
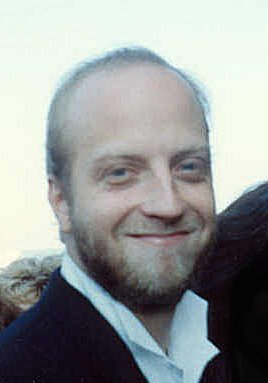
For his performance in Cabin Boy, Chris Elliott was nominated for a Golden Raspberry Award for "Worst New Star".

Cabin Boy opened on the first weekend of January 1994. Despite being a low-budget film, audience expectations were high due to Burton's name being attached as a producer; however, it received little notice upon release. The first screening was met with walk outs and negative comments. Resnick, who considered himself a film snob, was upset that his film was seen as being "something worse than the worst Pauly Shore movie" and hurt by test audiences viewing his direction as "hacky".

On Late Show with David Letterman, Letterman would frequently make jokes about the film after its failure, and for the 67th Academy Awards, which he hosted, Letterman asked Resnick to film a "Cabin Boy Auditions" sketch for the ceremony which cemented the film's reputation as a national punchline. Resnick later recalled, "it wasn't just that it was widely hated, it actually pissed people off". Due to the film's poor reception, Resnick never wanted to direct another film.

Chris Elliott earned a Golden Raspberry Award nomination for Worst New Star, but lost to Anna Nicole Smith for Naked Gun 33 1/3: The Final Insult. Elliott and Resnick later pitched another series for the Fox network that was not picked up, which Elliott blames on an executive having seen Cabin Boy.

=== Critical reception ===
In addition to the hostile reaction to the film from audiences, it was also poorly received by critics. Entertainment Weekly critic Owen Gleiberman gave the film a D+, writing "Elliott wears his loathsomeness like a cardboard crown. Few comedies have worked this hard to make everyone on screen look this dumb."

Bob Strauss of the Los Angeles Daily News ranked it as the worst film of the year. Rolling Stone film critic Peter Travers said that "for all the cinematic delights 1994 offered, it was still the year that gave the world Cabin Boy", and additional drubbing of the film appeared in articles unrelated to the film, with Resnick recounting that he'd read an article about the popularity of director's cuts released on LaserDisc which contained the rhetorical question, "What's next — a director's cut of Cabin Boy?"

== Legacy ==
After the film's initial failure, it would go on to develop a cult following on home video as a work of significant importance. Critic Nick Pinkerton wrote that "the tides of history have turned", and that "the brilliance of Elliott and Resnick's perverse picaresque is plain for anyone to see." Review aggravate Rotten Tomatoes gave the film a score of 52%.

Among the film's most devoted fans are comedian Patrick Monahan, drummer and comedian Jon Wurster and hip-hop producer Dan the Automator. The film was released on Blu-ray through Kino Lorber, an imprint specializing in art films, who dubbed the film "The Contentious Classic That Angered a Nation", suggesting that "the film that America used to kick around has been rehabilitated into something close to canon".
