= Lisa Jakub =

Canadian writer, yoga teacher, and former child actress

- Born: December 27, 1978 (age 47); Toronto, Ontario, Canada
- Education: University of Virginia
- Occupations: Actress; writer; yoga teacher
- Years active: 1985–2001 (actress); 2013–present (writer)
- Spouse: Jeremy Jones (m. 2005)
- Website: hellolisajakub.com

Lisa Jakub (/ˈdʒeɪkəb/; born December 27, 1978) is a Canadian writer, yoga teacher, and former child actress. She is best known for her roles as Lydia Hillard in the comedy-drama film Mrs. Doubtfire (1993) and as Alicia Casse in Independence Day (1996).

== Childhood and education ==
Jakub was born on December 27, 1978, in Toronto, Ontario. She is of Slovak (father) and Welsh and Scottish (mother) descent. Jakub attended multiple schools in her early life, including Hillfield Strathallan College.

Jakub graduated from the University of Virginia with a degree in sociology in 2010.

== Acting ==
Jakub's first role was as Katis' Granddaughter in the 1985 film Eleni. She appeared in comedy-drama film Mrs. Doubtfire (1993) alongside Mara Wilson, Sally Field, Matthew Lawrence, and Robin Williams. When Jakub received the part of Lydia in Mrs. Doubtfire, her high school expelled her for accruing too many absences. Robin Williams wrote a letter to Jakub's high school, pleading with them to re-admit her, but this was unsuccessful.

Jakub played Sandra in Matinee (1993), appeared in A Pig's Tale (1994) and Independence Day (1996), The Beautician and the Beast (1997), and played the "inspiration" for Princess Leia in the short film George Lucas in Love (1999). She starred in Picture Perfect (1995) and portrayed a bordello worker in the American Old West in Painted Angels (1997).

== Personal life ==
Jakub retired from acting in 2001 at age 22, and soon moved to Virginia. In 2005, she married Jeremy Jones, a longtime friend and former theatre manager. In 2014, Jakub stated she has no plans to return to acting.

Jakub later became a writer, authoring two non-fiction books: the autobiography You Look Like That Girl (2015) and Not Just Me (2017). She also contributes to online blogs.

Jakub is a qualified Kripalu yoga teacher. She has openly discussed her battles with anxiety, depression and panic attacks, from which she has suffered since her teenage years, and credits her yoga practice for helping her to overcome them. In 2021, Jakub launched a new website, BlueMala, which she described as the resource that she wished she had when she was in her darkest moments. The website contains Jakub's articles on mental wellness along with her yoga and meditation videos.

== Writings ==
- You Look Like That Girl: A Child Actor Stops Pretending and Finally Grows Up (2015)
- Not Just Me: Anxiety, Depression, and Learning to Embrace Your Weird (2017)
- (Don't) Call Me Crazy (contributing writer) (Algonquin, 2018)

== Filmography ==
=== Film ===
Year	Title	Role	Notes
1985	Eleni	Katis' Granddaughter	
1991	Rambling Rose	Doll	
1993	Matinee	Sandra	
1993	Mrs. Doubtfire	Lydia "Lydie" Hillard	
1994	A Pig's Tale	Tiffany	Video
1996	Independence Day	Alicia Casse	
1997	The Beautician and the Beast	Katrina Pochenko	
1998	Painted Angels	Georgie	Alternative title: The Wicked Wicked West
1999	A Walk on the Moon	Myra Naidell	
1999	George Lucas in Love	Marion	Short film
2000	Double Frame	Tara	

=== Television ===
Year	Title	Role	Notes
1986	The Right of the People	Katie	TV film
1986	Kay O'Brien	Allison Villaneuva	Episode: "Taking the Heat"
1986	Christmas Eve	Little Girl	TV film
1987	Friday the 13th: The Series	Kristen	Episode: "A Cup of Time"
1988	Once Upon a Giant	Little Red Riding Hood	TV film
1988	Alfred Hitchcock Presents	Missy	Episode: "Kandinsky's Vault"
1988	Emergency Room	Angie Sertoli	Episode: "All Hallows Eve"
1989	The Twilight Zone	Lisa Cranston	Episode: "Street of Shadows"
1989	Friday the 13th: The Series	Janine Carlson	Episode: "The Playhouse"
1989	Glory! Glory!		TV film
1989	The Phone Call	Holly Henderson	TV film
1990	War of the Worlds	Julie	Episode: "The Pied Piper"
1990	Night Court	Barbie	Episode: "My Three Dads"
1991	The Rape of Doctor Willis	Carrie Willis	TV film
1991	The Story Lady	Alexandra Pollard	TV film
1993	Bride of Violence 2	Anna	TV film
1994	A Child's Cry for Help	Amanda Spencer	TV film
1994	Due South	Christina Nichols	Episodes: "Chicago Holiday: Parts 1 & 2"
1995	Fight for Justice: The Nancy Conn Story	Leisa Conn	TV film
1995	Picture Perfect	J.J. Thomas	TV film
1996	Bermuda Triangle	Annie	TV film
1996	Reckoning	Shelley Maitland	TV film
1997	Newton: A Tale of Two Isaacs	Clara Storey	TV film
1997	On the Edge of Innocence	Ally Winthrop	TV film
1998	Dream House	Jenny Thornton	TV film
1999	Mentors	Joan of Arc	Episode: "Raising the Siege"
1999	Jack & Jill	Meg	Episode: "Pseudos, Sex and Sidebars"
2000	The Royal Diaries: Isabel - Jewel of Castilla	Isabel	TV film
