= The Beautician and the Beast =

1997 film by Ken Kwapis

- Theatrical release poster
- Directed by: Ken Kwapis
- Written by: Todd Graff
- Produced by: Todd Graff; Hawk Koch
- Starring: Fran Drescher; Timothy Dalton; Lisa Jakub; Ian McNeice; Patrick Malahide
- Cinematography: Peter Lyons Collister
- Edited by: Jon Poll
- Music by: Cliff Eidelman
- Production companies: High School Sweethearts; Paramount Pictures
- Distributed by: Paramount Pictures
- Release date: February 7, 1997
- Running time: 107 minutes
- Country: United States
- Language: English
- Budget: $16 million
- Box office: $11.5 million

The Beautician and the Beast is a 1997 American romantic comedy film directed by Ken Kwapis, written by Todd Graff, and starring Fran Drescher, Timothy Dalton, Lisa Jakub, Ian McNeice, and Patrick Malahide. It tells the story of a New York City beautician who is hired, under the false assumption that she is a science teacher, to tutor the four children of a dictator of a fictional Eastern European nation, played by Timothy Dalton. The film deals with the theme of cultural differences, and takes inspiration from other stories like Beauty and the Beast, The King and I, Evita, and The Sound of Music. Produced by Drescher's company High School Sweethearts in partnership with Paramount Pictures, The Beautician and the Beast was her first starring role in a film.

Drescher chose Graff to write the screenplay because of his familiarity with her style of humor. She pitched and sold the project as a vehicle to transition her career in television to film. Filming took place during the fall of 1996 in Greystone Mansion in Beverly Hills, California, in Prague, and at Sychrov Castle in the Czech Republic. Kwapis consulted with dialect coach Francie Brown to create the fictional language Slovetzian used in the film. Cliff Eidelman composed the soundtrack which features the London Metropolitan Orchestra.

The Beautician and the Beast was released on February 7, 1997, to generally negative reviews. Critics panned the story as more appropriate for a sitcom rather than a feature film, and called it a poor example of the romantic comedy genre. Drescher and Dalton received mixed reviews for their performances; Drescher was nominated for the Golden Raspberry Award for Worst Actress. The Beautician and the Beast was a box-office bomb, grossing roughly $11.5 million against a production budget of $16 million.

== Plot ==
The film opens with an animated sequence in which a prince awakens a princess with a kiss, though she rejects his romantic advances and runs away. The scene shifts to live action beautician Joy Miller, who teaches at a New York City beauty school. One of her students accidentally sets the classroom ablaze by igniting hair spray with a cigarette. She escorts her class and some caged animals to safety, prompting the New York Post to run a headline praising Joy as a hero. Ira Grushinsky, a diplomat from the Eastern European country Slovetzia, mistakes Joy for a science teacher after seeing a newspaper photo. He hires her as a tutor for the four children of Boris Pochenko, Slovetzia's dictator. However, she misinterprets his job offer as teaching hairstyling. Although she has never heard of the country, she accepts the job despite her initial hesitation. After arriving at Slovetzia, Ira is surprised to discover Joy's true identity, but she convinces him to keep it a secret.

Despite making a bad first impression with Boris, Joy gets along with his children Katrina, Karl, Masha, and Yuri. While teaching them about life outside Slovetzia, she also helps them to gain confidence in themselves. She learns about Katrina's relationship with Alek, the leader of the youth rebellion, and encourages Karl to pursue his dream of becoming an artist. Joy frequently clashes with Pochenko, who is disturbed by her independence and his inability to frighten her. Joy and Katrina go to a nightclub which also operates as a base for those planning the rebellion; Prime Minister Leonid Kleist follows the pair and arrests Alek.

Growing closer to Joy, Boris confesses to her that he wants to change his reputation as a "beast" among Western nations; she encourages him to form closer relationships with his citizens and shaves his mustache. During a trip to a factory, Joy realizes that Slovetzia lacks trade unions and encourages the workers to hold a strike. She also arranges a secret meeting between Katrina and Alek in his cell. Despite Leonid's advice to fire Joy, she convinces Boris to hold a party for visiting emissaries during a summit meeting to debut his new image; he places her in charge of the preparations. As part of the summit, Boris considers releasing Alek despite Leonid's disapproval. On the day of the event, Joy reveals her identity to Boris, but he does not care about her credentials. He thanks her for bringing happiness to him and his family.

During the party, Leonid confronts Joy about her role in Katrina's secret meetings with Alek and threatens to have her arrested for treason. Following Boris' decision to keep Alek in jail, Joy informs him that she had set up meetings between Alek and Katrina; he argues with Joy over her meddling in Slovetzia's political affairs. She quits and returns to New York City. Over the course of several weeks, Leonid quietly takes over administrative duties and signs death sentences in Boris' name. When Ira informs Boris that Leonid is usurping his power, he strips Leonid of his duties and arrests him on charges of treason. Boris reunites with Joy in New York City and informs her that he has freed Alek and agreed to hold free elections in Slovetzia. Boris kisses Joy after admitting his feelings for her.

== Cast ==
Cast list adapted from Rotten Tomatoes:

- Fran Drescher as Joy Miller
- Timothy Dalton as Boris Pochenko
- Ian McNeice as Ira Grushinsky
- Lisa Jakub as Katrina Pochenko
- Patrick Malahide as Leonid Kleist
- Michael Lerner as Jerry Miller
- Adam LaVorgna as Karl Pochenko
- Phyllis Newman as Judy Miller
- Heather DeLoach as Masha Pochenko
- Kyle and Tyler Wilkerson as Yuri Pochenko
- Timothy Dowling as Alek
- Michael Immel as Stage Manager
- Tonya Watts as Model
- Tamara Mello as Consuela
- Celeste Russi as Lupe
- Daniel R. Escobar as Hector
- Billy Brown as Fireman
- Jorge Noa as Photographer
- Carmela Rappazo as Student
- Clyde Wrenn as Student
- Earl Carroll as Factory Worker
- Vincent Schiavelli as Jailer
- Marianne Muellerleile as Chef
- R. Sparkle Stillman as Cousin Doris
- Edmund Cambridge as Elderly Man
- Todd Graff as Denny
- Gene Chronopoulos as Servant
- David Shackelford as Kitchen Worker
- Michael Horton as the voice of a fairy tale prince
- Jane Jenkins as Neighbor at Party
- Zdenek Vencl as Czech Guard
- Vaclav Legner as Czech Guard
- Leon Silver as Vaclav
- Stephen Marcus as Ivan
- Marshal Silverman as Tailor
- Dana Bednarova as Svetlana

== Production ==
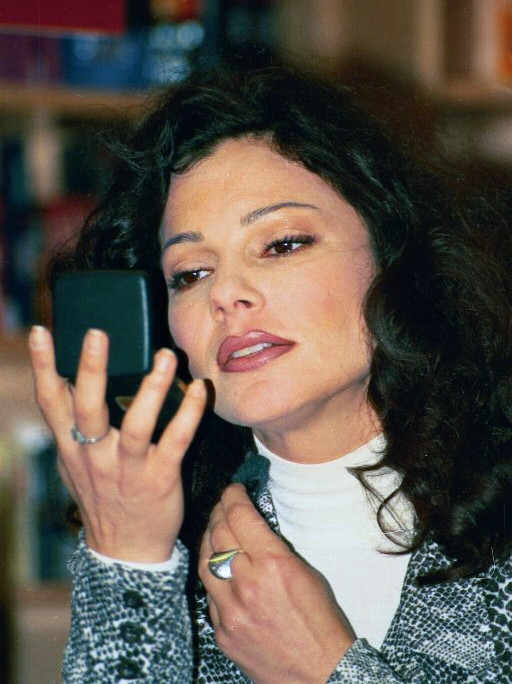
Fran Drescher (pictured in 1996) developed and starred in The Beautician and the Beast.

Fran Drescher developed and pitched the concept for The Beautician and the Beast, which she said was a homage to the musical The King and I (1951). Drescher was an executive producer for the film, which was handled through her production company High School Sweethearts. The writer Todd Graff was attached to The Beautician and the Beast during its pitch; Drescher chose him since they had a similar sense of humor and he was already "familiar with her voice and what type of dialogue suits her best". While producing the film, Drescher only wanted a script that was "written properly for [her]". Changes to the script occurred up until shooting started. Roger Birnbaum and Peter Marc Jacobson were also executive producers for the film, and Howard W. Koch, Jr. was a producer alongside Graff.

Drescher pursued her own film project because of the success of her sitcom The Nanny (1993–1999). Previously, she had only acted in supporting roles, first appearing in the 1977 drama Saturday Night Fever; Joy was her first starring role in a feature film. Worried about the audience's response to her move to film, Drescher modeled Joy after her previous performances; she explained: "It was a specific and strategic choice to not have the audience have to work too hard to accept me as another character. I wanted it to be an easy transition so they wouldn't have to bite off more than they can chew." Regarding audience expectations, director Ken Kwapis said Drescher "has had to overcome a lot of skepticism about her voice, her abilities, [and] the specificity of her comedy". He described the film as "more romantic than comic" and wanted it to introduce Drescher's vulnerability and "romantic side" alongside her "loud and brassy" comedy.

Timothy Dalton was announced as part of the cast in July 1996. Although Drescher had initially imagined Kevin Kline as Boris, he was unavailable. Kwapis said that Dalton had "a lot of charm and a very gentle tone". Comedian Laura House considered his casting to be "a testament to the time", writing "that's how popular Fran Drescher was". The A.V. Club's Will Harris classified The Beautician and the Beast as one of Dalton's lighter and more comedic projects. During a 2014 interview, Dalton shared that he had a positive experience during the filming and praised Drescher for her comic timing. Describing herself as "very protective" of Dalton during the filming, Drescher helped him with the comedy and ensured that he had enough funny lines.

The Beautician and the Beast was filmed in Greystone Mansion in Beverly Hills, California, Prague, and Sychrov Castle in the Czech Republic. The scenes in the Czech Republic were shot in the fall of 1996; during filming, Drescher hired a chef from Tuscany to prepare meals for her. Peter Lyons Collister handled the cinematography, and Jon Poll was the editor. Kwapis recruited dialect coach Francie Brown to construct the fictional language Slovetzian; it contains influences from Czech, Russian, and Hungarian. The Beautician and the Beast was completed on a budget of $16 million. Its final cut is 107 minutes long.

== Themes ==
Fran Drescher attributed the film's humor to the "juxtaposition of her colorful American character onto a dark, oppressive-looking castle". According to film critic Emanuel Levy, the film personifies a "culture clash of Western democracy vs. rigid and inefficient communism" through Joy and Boris. Levy wrote that Joy pushes Slovetzia into "the liberal, technologically advanced 21st century", and The Baltimore Sun's Stephen Hunter characterized her as the "very spirit of liberalism" and the "distilled essence of yenta". Critics have compared Boris to Joseph Stalin. Hunter believed the comparison was intentional given his "tunic, brush cut, inscrutable expression and pious delta of mustache", but added that these markers are quickly dropped to emphasize his transformation into a more democratic leader and "a wild and crazy guy".

Some critics have cited The Beautician and the Beast as an adaptation of the fairy tale Beauty and the Beast, while others believed The Nanny was its inspiration. The film was likened to the stage musicals The King and I and The Sound of Music (1959) due to its focus on gender and cultural differences. Barry Monush, a researcher for the Paley Center for Media, highlighted the scene in which Joy creates clothing from Ralph Lauren bedding as the most obvious allusion to The Sound of Music. Levy interpreted The Beautician and the Beast as a "musical without songs". The film was compared to Ernst Lubitsch's Ninotchka (1939) and The Shop Around the Corner (1940), and music columnist David Hirsch wrote that the movie's soundtrack was similar to those in 1940s films. Katrina's relationship with Alek was likened to Juliet's romance with Romeo in the play Romeo and Juliet, while the opening animation was seen as a parody of the Disney films Snow White and the Seven Dwarfs (1937) and Sleeping Beauty (1959).

== Music ==
The Beautician and the Beast

Soundtrack album by Cliff Eidelman
- Released: February 11, 1997
- Genre: Feature film soundtrack
- Length: 30:54
- Label: Milan Records
- Producer: Cliff Eidelman

The soundtrack for The Beautician and the Beast was composed by Cliff Eidelman and recorded at the CTS Studios in Wembley, United Kingdom. Its 19 tracks feature the London Metropolitan Orchestra. The score incorporates elements of Russian classical music and waltz. Eidelman composed 17 of the tracks, while the remaining two—"L'Internationale" and "The J Waltz"—are traditional works by composers Pierre De Geyter and Jerry Graff, respectively. A choir is featured on "L'Internationale". John Beal composed the film's trailer music; although it was not included on the soundtrack, the track was later released on a compilation album of Beal's trailer music.

Milan Records released the soundtrack on February 11, 1997, as an audio CD; it was later made available through the music streaming service Spotify. The soundtrack received mixed critical reviews. Hirsch praised it as a "charmingly old-fashioned romantic score". AllMusic's Jason Ankeny commended Eidelman for not relying on the "sweetness and sentimentality that capsize so many comedic scores", but he criticized the melodies as "leaden and unfocused, with none of the effervescence the genre demands".

Track list
No.	Title	Composer	Length
1.	"Prelude"	Cliff Eidelman	1:12
2.	"Joy Falls on a Cloud"	Cliff Eidelman	1:19
3.	"The Castle"	Cliff Eidelman	1:38
4.	"Party Preparations"	Cliff Eidelman	1:41
5.	"Walking on the Edge"	Cliff Eidelman	1:29
6.	"Falling for the President"	Cliff Eidelman	2:35
7.	"Pochenko Meets the Peasants"	Cliff Eidelman	2:07
8.	"L'Internationale"	Pierre De Geyter	1:45
9.	"Kleist Blackmails Joy"	Cliff Eidelman	2:02
10.	"His Excellency"	Cliff Eidelman	0:34
11.	"Cinderella's Confession"	Cliff Eidelman	1:51
12.	"The Chicken"	Cliff Eidelman	1:10
13.	"Ballroom Waltz"	Cliff Eidelman	1:31
14.	"The J Waltz"	Jerry Graff	2:44
15.	"Boris' Proud Speech"	Cliff Eidelman	1:10
16.	"You Are a Beast"	Cliff Eidelman	2:11
17.	"Going Away"	Cliff Eidelman	2:20
18.	"The Prince and the Princess"	Cliff Eidelman	1:35
Total length:			30:54

== Release and box office ==
The premiere of The Beautician and the Beast was held in Hollywood on February 4, 1997. The film had received a PG film rating from the Motion Picture Association of America (MPAA) following a review at a Paramount screening room in Los Angeles. It received a wide release on February 7, 1997, through Paramount Pictures as a Koch Company production, and was shown in 1,801 theaters. Emanuel Levy believed the film was intended for "the Valentine's Day dating crowd".

The Beautician and the Beast opened at number three in the United States box office, and grossed $4.1 million on its opening weekend. It earned $11,486,880 during its theatrical run; in 2015, Box Office Mojo estimated the film made $22,548,300 when adjusted for ticket price inflation. The Beautician and the Beast failed to meet its budget and was considered a box-office bomb. Drescher attributed the poor box office returns to the film debuting at the same time as the Star Wars "Special Edition" remaster.

The VHS release debuted at number 38 on the Billboard Top Video Sales chart on March 21, 1998. Drescher provided audio commentary for the DVD version, which was released on June 24, 2003. The Beautician and the Beast was made available for purchase on Amazon Prime Video; it was also released on streaming services Netflix, between April 2015 and October 2015, and HBO Max upon its launch in 2020. In a 2020 interview, Drescher said the film continues to provide revenue for Paramount Pictures and has developed a following. According to Drescher, Paramount Pictures president Sherry Lansing described the film's longevity as evident through its high video and cable sales.

== Critical reception ==
The Beautician and the Beast received primarily negative responses, holding a score of 19% on Rotten Tomatoes based on 21 reviews. Roger Ebert gave the film two stars, praising Drescher's performance but saying audiences would be unable to empathize with her character, since "we never feel she's really uncertain, insecure or vulnerable". Film.com's Eric Snider criticized the plot for lacking humor and character development. In a negative review of the script, the Chicago Tribune's Gene Siskel wished that the film was smarter with its parody of The Sound of Music. On the other hand, TV Guide's Maitland McDonagh and IGN's Arnold T. Blumberg considered The Beautician and the Beast to be inoffensive and fluffy enough to be enjoyable. In a review for The Philadelphia Inquirer, Carrie Rickey described the film as the "tastykake of snack movies" and "shameless and intermittently funny".

Reviewers criticized the film as too similar to a sitcom, including The New York Times' Stephen Holden who said Kwapis and Graff did not elevate the material enough to justify a theatrical release. In an Entertainment Weekly article, Lisa Schwarzbaum wrote that The Beautician and the Beast and the 1997 film Fools Rush In were "hampered, to greater or lesser degree, by the synthetic conceits of their stretched-out stories". Commentators felt Joy was just a copy of Fran Fine, Drescher's character on The Nanny, and believed the film was a poor example of the romantic comedy genre. The San Diego Reader's Duncan Shepherd dismissed The Beautician and the Beast as an "inverted and cut-rate Ninotchka". Describing the film as a "dated '90s [romantic comedy]", Grace Montgomery, writing for Common Sense Media, said it relied too much on clichés and stereotypes. In a 2015 listicle, Refinery29's Erin Donnelly included Joy and Boris among those romantic comedy pairings which lacked chemistry. However, in the same year, Lauren Le Vine for the same publication considered the film a classic, and praised the chemistry between Drescher and Dalton as an "awkward friction".

Drescher's performance received mixed reviews. Emanuel Levy praised Drescher as "a warm, funny and likable performer", although he believed she was too old to play an ingénue. Levy likened her voice and Jewish mannerisms to Fanny Brice and Barbra Streisand. Praising the film for having the "postwar naivete" of the 1950s film, the Chicago Tribune's John Petrakis wrote that Drescher's style, specifically her "big hair, thick makeup, loud clothes, and bizarre voice", was reminiscent of Judy Holliday. In more negative comparisons, Jeff Vice called Drescher and Dalton inferior actors to Deborah Kerr and Yul Brynner, respectively, and Eric Snider panned her role as "a hell-spawned, snort-laughing Mary Poppins". Drescher's voice was the frequent subject of criticism; Maitland McDonagh said she had a "nasal honk [that] could shatter crystal", but believed her fans would enjoy her performance. Drescher received a nomination for the Golden Raspberry Award for Worst Actress for the 18th Golden Raspberry Awards.

Critics also had mixed reviews for Dalton's performance. The Washington Post's Rita Kempley praised Dalton for his campy style, and the Deseret News' Jeff Vice wrote that he had "well-chosen facial expressions and some subtle nuances". Despite finding Dalton to be "eventually amiable", Stephen Hunter said The Beautician and the Beast was not a star-making vehicle for him. In a review for the Los Angeles Times, John Anderson enjoyed Dalton's comedic acting, but wrote that "everyone ... comes off as stiff next to Drescher". Maitland McDonagh considered Dalton too serious, however, believing he cast "a damper on the strenuously lighthearted goings-on". In the Lincoln Journal Star, a writer said Dalton had a "constipated scowl", which they felt was an "appropriate mood for sitting through The Beautician and the Beast".
