= Death to Smoochy =

2002 film by Danny DeVito

- Theatrical release poster
- Directed by: Danny DeVito
- Written by: Adam Resnick
- Produced by: Andrew Lazar; Peter MacGregor-Scott
- Starring: Robin Williams; Edward Norton; Catherine Keener; Danny DeVito; Jon Stewart
- Cinematography: Anastas N. Michos
- Edited by: Jon Poll
- Music by: David Newman
- Production companies: FilmFour; Senator Entertainment; Mad Chance Productions
- Distributed by: Warner Bros. Pictures (United States and Germany); FilmFour Distributors (United Kingdom)
- Release date: March 29, 2002
- Running time: 109 minutes
- Countries: Germany; United Kingdom; United States
- Language: English
- Budget: $50 million
- Box office: $8.3 million

Death to Smoochy is a 2002 American satirical black comedy crime film directed by Danny DeVito and written by Adam Resnick. Starring Robin Williams, Edward Norton, Catherine Keener, DeVito, and Jon Stewart, the film centers on "Rainbow" Randolph Smiley (Williams), a disgraced former children's television host who attempts to sabotage his replacement, Sheldon Mopes (Norton), and his character, Smoochy the Rhino. Unfortunately, both of them are stuck in midst of the corrupt industry of children's entertainment.

Produced by FilmFour, Senator Entertainment and Andrew Lazar's Mad Chance Productions, the German-British-American co-production was released in the United States on March 29, 2002, by Warner Bros. Pictures. It received mixed to negative reviews from critics and was a box-office bomb, grossing $8.3 million against a budget of $50 million, but has since developed a cult following.

== Plot ==
In 2001, "Rainbow" Randolph Smiley hosts a popular children's television show on the fictional children's TV network National KidNet called The Rainbow Randolph Show, with his friendly onscreen persona masking his alcoholism, emotional instability, and criminal behavior. His career ends after he is arrested by the FBI at Patsy's Warehouse for accepting bribes; his show is cancelled, and he is evicted from KidNet's corporate penthouse, leaving him homeless and destitute. Ordered by the network's chair to find a replacement with a clean public image, executive Marion Stokes selects the naive Sheldon Mopes and his character Smoochy the Rhino. Sheldon is sincere, dedicated to providing quality children's entertainment with his show Smoochy's Magic Jungle while being completely opposed to the concept of merchandising, which puts him at odds with his new producer Nora Wells, KidNet's vice president of development.

The immediate popularity of Smoochy's Magic Jungle causes Randolph to fixate his anger and vengeance on Sheldon. After Stokes declines to help him regain his job, Randolph hatches several unsuccessful attempts to have Sheldon removed. Finally hitting rock bottom, Randolph turns to his former partner, Angelo Pike, for help. Angelo consents and allows him to stay at his apartment.

Feeling that he is losing creative control over his show to Nora, Sheldon hires corrupt talent agent Burke Bennett, who assists him in renegotiating his contract to make him executive producer of his program, giving him full control and licensing rights over Smoochy. During dinner, Burke welcomes him to the dark side of the entertainment business by presenting him with a gun and introduces him to Irish mob boss Tommy Cotter and her cousin Lawrence "Spinner" Dunn, a retired heavyweight boxer with brain damage who owns a nightclub and also functions as the mascot for the restaurant she and her fellow mobsters run. Tommy pressures Sheldon into casting Spinner as Smoochy's cousin Moochy, vowing to shield him from subsequent harm.

Increasingly impatient with Sheldon, Burke books him to star in a Smoochy ice show, run by Merv Green and his corrupt charity, Parade of Hope. When he declines despite Burke's warnings, Green threatens Sheldon into acquiescing, reminding him that the Parade of Hope has sponsored KidNet ice shows since 1964. Meanwhile, Randolph tricks Sheldon into performing at a Nazi rally, consequently resulting him being branded as anti-American and a racist, causing him to lose both his job and show, with KidNet giving up on making original programming. Randolph visits Nora to ask for his job back, but when he accidentally reveals about setting Sheldon up, she notifies Tommy, who tracks him down with her gang and forces him to confess about the setup. As a result, Randolph is vilified by the media, and Sheldon's show and reputation are restored. After Randolph angrily destroys Angelo's television, the latter kicks him out of his apartment. Nora and Sheldon reconcile and begin a romantic relationship.

Sheldon decides to host his own ice show without the corrupt charities involved. Burke and Stokes, under pressure from Green, plot to kill Sheldon and hire a new host who will accommodate their corruption. Their plan backfires when Green's minions misidentify Spinner in his Moochy costume as Sheldon and murder him, causing Tommy to slaughter Green and his minions in retaliation. Randolph confronts Sheldon and Nora at gunpoint and reveals that Nora had affairs with several other KidNet hosts, including himself. Sheldon calms Randolph down and disarms him.

Burke and Stokes decide to hire Buggy Ding Dong, a former KidNet show host who lost the job due to his heroin addiction, to kill Sheldon during the ice show, which is an operatic retelling of the story from Sheldon's point of view. Randolph intervenes and rescues Sheldon by fighting Buggy, who ends up getting killed in the process. Realizing that he was set up, Sheldon chases after Burke, and threatens him with the gun he gave him. However, Tommy intervenes and deals with both men herself, not wanting Sheldon to throw away his ideals after he helped her cousin. Sheldon and Nora kiss in Times Square in front of KidNet Studios. Nora quits production to work alongside Sheldon as a performer, and the now redeemed Randolph is given his job back as the latter's co-host.

== Cast ==
- Robin Williams as "Rainbow" Randolph Smiley, a television kid show host who falls from grace and his career ended after being arrested for accepting bribes. The loss of his job and home causes Randolph to become emotionally disturbed, and he becomes fixated on having Sheldon Mopes fired so that he can return to his old life.
- Edward Norton as Sheldon Mopes/Smoochy the Rhino, a struggling entertainer whom Kidnet taps as Rainbow Randolph's replacement. He is considered "squeaky clean" as he lives a scandal-free life and teaches positivity and healthy living with his act. He is also very idealistic and struggles to adapt to the dark world of television.
- Danny DeVito as Burke Bennett, a corrupt talent agent who represents Sheldon in his contract negotiations with Kidnet. Burke is involved in embezzling money from charity events that his clients host, and he pressures Sheldon to cooperate with the scheme.
- Catherine Keener as Nora Wells, a bitter, disillusioned television producer who coordinates the filming of Kidnet's shows and has a fetish for men who perform children's programming. She and Sheldon clash at first but develop a romantic relationship.
- Jon Stewart as Marion Frank Stokes, a Kidnet executive who oversees the network programming. He is also involved in embezzling money and is torn between the network's orders and the pressure that he receives to get skimmed money flowing again.
- Pam Ferris as Tommy Cotter, a boss in the Irish mob. She convinces Sheldon to give her cousin Spinner a part on TV; to show her gratitude, she vows to protect Sheldon from harm.
- Michael Rispoli as Lawrence "Spinner" Dunn/Moochy the Rhino, a retired boxer with brain damage who becomes obsessed with Smoochy's Magic Jungle and is cast as Moochy at the urging of Tommy Cotter.
- Harvey Fierstein as Merv Green, the morally corrupt organizer of the Parade of Hope charity who uses KidNet talent to host fundraising ice shows, with the proceeds siphoned for personal gain.
- Danny Woodburn as Angelo Pike, a former cast member on Rainbow Randolph's show who goes to work for Smoochy's Magic Jungle. He is the only person willing to help the deranged Randolph, giving him a place to stay and taking care of him.
- Vincent Schiavelli as Buggy Ding Dong, another former Kidnet show host who ends up a homeless heroin addict. In desperation, Burke and Stokes hire him to murder Sheldon, with the promise of getting his old show back if he succeeds.
- Robert Prosky as the Chairman of KidNet. He orders Stokes to find a new show host that won't generate any controversy.
- Tracey Walter as Ben Franks
- Todd Graff as Skip Kleinman
- Peter Kosaka as "Tinpan" Takashi Yamashita. He was originally going to be in the film but was scrapped and only kept in a deleted scene.
- Shawn Byfield as Rickets the Hippo. He plays a very small part in the film.

== Production ==
=== Preproduction ===
In November or December 2000, screenwriter Adam Resnick wrote the screenplay for the film, while art designers sketched designs for the characters. In the original screenplay, the Smoochy costume was orange. The final film used a magenta costume instead.

Resnick said the film mostly stayed true to his script, although the original was fifteen pages too long, and that subplots and a narrator had to be removed. Edward Norton was the first person Resnick brought the script to, as the character had been written for him.

=== Filming ===
Principal photography began in January 2001. Sequences were filmed in several locations in New York City, such as Times Square, Coney Island, Upper West Side and Duane Street in Lower Manhattan. A brief shot of the North Tower of the World Trade Center can be seen where Rainbow Randolph is dancing on the small bench in Duane Park. In the DVD commentary, Danny DeVito said that it was the only shot in the movie in which the towers are seen. No changes were made after the September 11, 2001, terrorist attacks. Filming production moved to Canada in spring 2001. The KidNet Studio scenes were shot in Canadian Broadcasting Centre in Toronto. In the ice-show scene with Smoochy and Rainbow, Robin Williams's stunt double Elvis Stojko choreographed some of the skating moves for Rainbow Randolph. Robin was offstage. Filming ended in May 2001.

== Home media ==
The film was released on VHS and DVD on September 17, 2002, by Warner Home Video. The film was later released on Blu-ray by boutique distributor Shout Factory on August 20, 2024. The Blu-ray was based on a new 2K restoration made with the film's original interpositive.

== Reception ==
=== Critical response ===
On Rotten Tomatoes, Death to Smoochy holds an approval rating of 42%, based on 119 reviews, with an average rating of 5.3/10. The site's critical consensus states: "The talent involved can't save a script that has nowhere to go with its promising premise." On Metacritic, the film has a score of 38 out of 100, based on 30 critics, indicating "generally unfavorable" reviews. Audiences polled by CinemaScore gave the film an average grade of "C" on a scale of A+ to F.

Roger Ebert of The Chicago Sun-Times gave the film an extremely negative review (giving it half a star out of four), saying, "Only enormously talented people could have made Death to Smoochy. Those with lesser gifts would have lacked the nerve to make a film so bad, so miscalculated, so lacking any connection with any possible audience. To make a film this awful, you have to have enormous ambition and confidence, and dream big dreams." He named the film the Worst of the Year.

Todd McCarthy of Variety also gave the film a negative review, saying that it "pushes its dark, smart, clever, cynical, satirical, nasty, provocative and sarcastic instincts to the point of heavily diminished returns—to the point where the very amusing premise just isn't funny anymore."

Peter Travers of Rolling Stone wrote, "This black-comic assault on family entertainment is going to set a lot of teeth on edge—If only his [DeVito's] material were better this time."

Conversely, J. Hoberman of The Village Voice praised the film, saying, "Death to Smoochy is often very funny, but what's even more remarkable is the integrity of DeVito's misanthropic vision."

David Sterritt of The Christian Science Monitor called the film a "razor-sharp satire" and "the most refreshingly outrageous movie of the season".

=== Box office ===
Although it received a wide release in the United States by playing in 2,164 theaters during its opening weekend, the film was a box-office bomb after grossing $4,266,463 in its opening weekend and $8,382,691 overall against a $50 million budget, with negligible box-office receipts outside the North American market.

=== Accolades ===
Robin Williams received a Razzie Award nomination for Worst Supporting Actor for his performance as Randolph in this film, but lost to Hayden Christensen for his performance in Star Wars: Episode II – Attack of the Clones.
