= Johnny Sanders (disambiguation) =

Johnny Sanders (1922–1990) was an American professional football executive.

Johnny Sanders may also refer to:

- Johnny Sanders, character in arcade game Mach Breakers: Numan Athletics 2

== See also ==
- John Sanders (disambiguation)
- Jonny Saunders (born 1975), British sports reporter
