= Joyful Noise (film) =

- Theatrical release poster
- Directed by: Todd Graff
- Written by: Todd Graff
- Produced by: Broderick Johnson; Andrew Kosove; Michael Nathanson; Joseph Farrell; Catherine Paura
- Starring: Queen Latifah; Dolly Parton; Keke Palmer; Courtney B. Vance; Jeremy Jordan; Kris Kristofferson
- Cinematography: David Boyd
- Edited by: Kathryn Himoff
- Music by: Mervyn Warren
- Production companies: Alcon Entertainment; Farrell Paura Productions
- Distributed by: Warner Bros. Pictures
- Release date: January 13, 2012
- Running time: 118 minutes
- Country: United States
- Language: English
- Budget: $25 million
- Box office: $31.2 million

Joyful Noise is a 2012 American Christian musical comedy drama film written and directed by Todd Graff, with gospel-infused music by Mervyn Warren. It stars Queen Latifah, Dolly Parton (in her final appearance in a theatrical feature film before her death in 2026), Keke Palmer, Jeremy Jordan in his feature film debut, Courtney B. Vance and Kris Kristofferson.

The film follows two strong-minded women who are forced to cooperate when budget cuts threaten to shut down a small-town choir. Filming began in February 2011 and wrapped up in April of that year. The film was released in the United States on January 13, 2012 by Warner Bros. Pictures and Alcon Entertainment and received mixed reviews from critics, with praise for its songs and acting but criticism of its script and tone. The film grossed $31.2 million worldwide against a $25 million budget.

== Plot ==
After the death of a small-town church choir director Bernard Sparrow in Pacashau, Georgia, Vi Rose Hill, a mother raising two teenagers alone, takes control of the choir using the traditional Gospel style that their Pastor Dale approves of. However, the director's widow, G. G. Sparrow, the main benefactor to the church, believes she should have been given the position. As in previous years, the choir reaches the regional finals of the national amateur "Joyful Noise" competition, only to be disappointed when a rival choir beats them. Tough times in the town have led to budget problems that threaten to close down the choir, at a time when the town needs the choir's inspiring music more than ever.

Vi Rose has a son, Walter, who has Asperger syndrome, and a talented, beautiful and independent daughter, Olivia, who detests being under her mother's household rules. G. G. has recently begun caring for her rebellious, drifter grandson, Randy. A romance blossoms between Olivia and Randy, which is strongly opposed by Vi Rose. Olivia also has a rival suitor, Manny. At Randy's urging, G. G., Olivia and most of the choir come to believe that some more contemporary arrangements (prepared by Randy) would be more successful for the choir. It also turns out that the choir has a chance at the national finals of the competition when the rival choir is found to have cheated by hiring professionals. But the pastor says that the church will not sponsor the choir unless they continue to use their reverent, traditional style.

Vi Rose's husband, Marcus, enlisted in the army after having trouble finding work at home, but his prolonged absence has saddened his family and causes additional tension between Vi Rose and Olivia. When Randy takes Olivia to visit Marcus (as Vi Rose hasn't, despite multiple opportunities to do so as they only live about an hour or so from where he's stationed), Marcus confesses he ran out on them under the guise of serving his country and providing for his family. But Olivia lovingly stands by him, wanting to live with him and encouragingly tells him about the letters allegedly written from him, only for them to realize Vi Rose wrote them pretending to be Marcus to hide the fact their family is now officially separated.

Meanwhile, a vivacious member of the choir who choreographs their routines, Earla, after a long dry stretch, finds passion first with Mr. Hsu, whose weak heart gives way by morning, and later with Justin. The town's tough times forces another choir member, Caleb, and his family out of business. Vi Rose and G. G. come to blows in a confrontation at a crowded diner where Vi Rose is then fired from her job, Olivia's frustration with her mother boils over, and G. G. threatens Pastor Dale with disendowing the church if the choir is not allowed to compete in the finals with the new arrangements.

Meanwhile, Randy befriends Walter and begins to teach him how to play the piano. One day, while at the quarry Randy and Walter are hanging out as Manny arrives. Randy and Manny begin to fight over Olivia ending with Randy giving Manny a bloody nose. When returning home, Walter brags to Vi Rose about the fight. Angered by the news, she throws out Randy and tells him to leave her family alone. However Olivia and Randy continue seeing each other and G.G. assures them Vi Rose will come around. Their first competition is Holy Vision Church of Detroit which has won three times, however they are rightfully suspicious of their rival as the singers are different from the video and they have 10 hours of rehearsal everyday. However, G.G. found out that Detroit actually hired paid professionals in their choir which is against the rules. Meanwhile, Randy is able to befriend Manny and convince him to help out the choir with his guitar skills.

The choir travels to Los Angeles for the finals, feeling very unsettled. Vi Rose and Olivia have a fight and Vi Rose slaps Olivia. Tough competition presents itself in the form of a choir made up of cute pre-teens, with a charismatic young soloist. But Vi Rose, G.G., Olivia and Randy pull the choir together and they give a rousing performance, using the new arrangements and choreography, capturing first place. The choir returns to town in triumph. One year later, Earla and Justin get married and then Marcus comes back to his family.

== Cast ==
- Queen Latifah as Vi Rose Hill, Olivia and Walter's mother.
- Dolly Parton as G. G. Sparrow, Randy's maternal grandmother.
- Keke Palmer as Olivia Hill, Vi Rose's daughter, Walter's younger sister and Randy's love interest.
- Jeremy Jordan as Randy Garrity, Sparrow's grandson and Olivia's love interest.
- Dexter Darden as Walter Hill, Vi Rose's son and Olivia's older brother.
- Courtney B. Vance as Pastor Dale
- Kris Kristofferson as Bernard Sparrow, G. G.'s late husband and Randy's late maternal grandfather.
- Kirk Franklin as Baylor Sykes, the choir leader for a rival church.
- Jesse L. Martin as Marcus Hill, Vi Rose's estranged husband and Olivia and Walter's father.
- Angela Grovey as Earla Hughes, the choir's choreographer.
- Andy Karl as Caleb, a choir member whose family loses its business.
- Dequina Moore as Devonne, a talkative choir member.
- Paul Woolfolk as Manny, a young guitarist with an interest in Olivia.
- Francis Jue as Ang Hsu, a choir member who is attracted to Earla.
- Roy Huang as Justin, Earla's second lover.
- Judd Lormand as Officer Darrel Lino
- Shameik Moore as Our Lady of Perpetual Tears choir master
- Ivan Kelley Jr. as the soloist of the Our Lady of Perpetual Tears choir.
- Karen Peck as competition host, lead singer "Mighty High"
- Chloe Bailey as a choir member of Our Lady of Perpetual Tears

== Production ==
The concept for Joyful Noise originated from an original version of the screenplay titled Love The Light by Max Myers. On August 2010, it was announced that Queen Latifah and Dolly Parton would star in the film to be directed by Todd Graff. Graff drew inspiration from attending at a national gospel choir competition in Newark, New Jersey as well as childhood experiences with music groups, most notably his mother's leadership of a Hadassah Jewish choir rehearsing in their home in New York City. He also conducted research by observing the actual gospel competitions that had grown in scale. Filming began in February 2011, in locations throughout Georgia, such as Atlanta, Decatur, Newnan, Dallas, Conyers, Peachtree City, and historic Howard's Restaurant in Smyrna. The movie finished filming in early April 2011.

== Soundtrack ==
The soundtrack album was released January 10, 2012 by WaterTower Music, featuring most of the songs from the film.

Additionally, the songs "Letters from the 9th Ward / Walk Away Renée" by Rickie Lee Jones, "On My Phone" by Jack Miz, and "My Friend the Sun" by Peter Holsapple and Chris Stamey appear in the film but do not appear on the soundtrack album. A cover of the song "I'm 'n Luv (wit a Stripper)" by T-Pain and Mike Jones is also performed in the film by Jeremy Jordan and Dexter Darden, but does not appear on the soundtrack.

The soundtrack debuted at #1 on the Billboard Magazine's Soundtrack and Gospel Albums chart. It also ranked at #21 on the Billboard 200 chart, selling 13,000 copies in its first week of release.

== Release ==
=== Marketing ===
To promote the film, Warner Bros. partnered with Atlas Mind Creative to create a Facebook app that allowed it users to create personalized choir-sung messages.

=== Home media ===
The film was released on DVD and Blu-ray on May 1, 2012 by Warner Home Video.

== Reception ==
=== Box office ===
The film opened at #4 at the weekend box office, grossing $11.2 million on its opening weekend. By the end of its run, the film grossed $31.2 million worldwide against a $25 million production budget.

=== Critical response ===
The film received mixed reviews from critics, with praise going toward its songs and acting but criticized for its screenplay and tone. On Rotten Tomatoes the film has an approval rating of 32% based on 129 reviews, with an average rating of 4.70/10. The website's critical consensus reads, "Joyful Noise's musical numbers are solidly entertaining, and it benefits from Queen Latifah and Dolly Parton's sizable chemistry; unfortunately, they aren't enough to make up for the rest of the film." On Metacritic, the film has a score of 44 out of 100, indicating "mixed or average" reviews.

Roger Ebert of the Chicago Sun-Times described the film as "an ungainly assembly of parts that don't fit, and the strange thing is that it makes no particular effort to please its target audience, which would seem to be lovers of gospel choirs." Christy Lemire of The Boston Globe felt that "if some incarnation of Glee were to be developed for the Christian Broadcasting Network, it would probably look a lot like Joyful Noise. Peter Debruge of Variety claims that "despite the sheer volume of music on offer, very little of it feels authentic – or especially inspiring." Todd McCarthy of The Hollywood Reporter felt that everyone in the film "is so fundamentally decent and goody-goody that no real tension or unresolvable conflicts ever surface." Stephen Holden of The New York Times called the film "a suspense-free singing competition drama; a down-home, just-folks bucket of cornpone," criticizing its predictability and for its lack of depth in the film's romantic and dramatic elements.

Some critics found positive things to say about the film. Richard Corliss of Time magazine stated that "the critic in me can authoritatively declare that the film is crap. The fan in me sent his shirt to the dry cleaners for tear removal." Owen Gleiberman of Entertainment Weekly felt that "the movie's musical numbers are catchy and rollicking and, in their bright sunshiny way, rather soulful." Rex Reed of The New York Observer stated, "Don't expect high art, and you will leave Joyful Noise smiling to the beat." In a 2021 retrospective review, Rebecca Nicholson of The Guardian called it "heartwarming and uplifting" despite the film's cheesiness.

=== Accolades ===
The film won the 2012 Inspirational Country Music Awards' Faith, Family, & Country Movie of the Year. The film also received an nomination at the 60th Motion Picture Sound Editors Golden Reel Awards for "Best Sound Editing - Music in a Musical".

== Stage adaptation ==
In 2025, it was announced that the film would be adapted into a stage musical, with a book by Todd Graff, and music and lyrics by Mervn Warren, Siedah Garrett, and Graff. The score would also include songs from Dolly Parton's catalogue. In 2026, a reading was held in New York City starring Orfeh as G.G. Sparrow and Natasha Yvette Williams as Vi Rose Hill.

== See also ==
- The Fighting Temptations
- Sister Act
- Let It Shine
- List of black films of the 2010s
