= Todd Graff =

American actor, writer and director (born 1959)

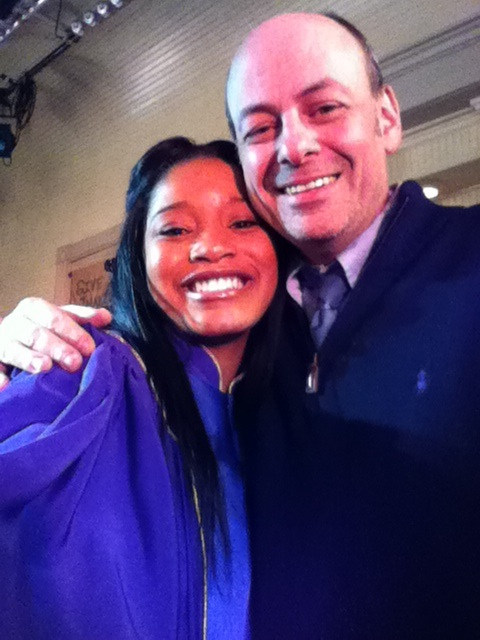
- Graff (right) with Keke Palmer in 2011
- Born: October 22, 1959 (age 66); New York, New York, United States
- Occupations: Actor, filmmaker
- Years active: 1970–present
- Spouse: Jhon Lafaurie (m. 2014)
- Relatives: Ilene Graff (sister); Randy Graff (cousin)

Todd Graff (born October 22, 1959) is an American actor and filmmaker. He is best known for writing and directing the musical comedy films Camp (2003), for which he was nominated for the Grand Jury Prize at the Sundance Film Festival, Bandslam (2009), and Joyful Noise (2012). Graff is also known for his supporting roles in the science fiction films The Abyss (1989) and Strange Days (1995), as well as the black comedy crime film Death to Smoochy (2002).

== Early life ==
Graff was born in New York City, the son of Judith Clarice (née Oxhorn), a piano teacher and choirmaster, and Jerome Lawrence Graff, a musician. His sister is actress Ilene Graff.

== Career ==
Graff is an alumnus both as a camper and counselor of the Stagedoor Manor performing arts summer camp in upstate New York. He sang on the original-cast albums of Sesame Street (1970) and the follow-up Sesame Street 2 (1971). He garnered fame in 1975 when he joined the cast of the PBS children's television series The Electric Company. Playing the role of Jesse, a member of the Short Circus, he remained with the show to the end of its production in 1977 (replacing Stephen Gustafson).

Graff's writing credits include Camp, Used People, The Vanishing, and The Beautician and the Beast. Graff acted in several films including Death to Smoochy, Dominick and Eugene, Strange Days, Not Quite Paradise, and The Abyss.

He was nominated for a Tony Award for his portrayal of Danny in Broadway's Baby in 1984. He starred in the 1987 Off-Broadway musical Birds of Paradise as Homer. In 2006, Graff directed the stage musical 13 by Jason Robert Brown and Dan Elish at the Mark Taper Forum. In 2009, he co-wrote and directed the film Bandslam. In 2012 he wrote and directed the film Joyful Noise. He developed Apple TV's miniseries The Crowded Room (2023).

== Filmography ==
=== Film ===
Year	Title	Role	Notes
1985	Not Quite Paradise	Rothwell T. Schwartz	Also known as Not Quite Jerusalem
1987	Five Corners	James	
1987	Sweet Lorraine	Leonard	
1988	Dominick and Eugene	Larry Higgins	
1989	After Midnight	Tough Kid	
1989	An Innocent Man	Robby	
1989	The Abyss	Alan "Hippy" Carnes	
1990	Framed	Pete	
1990	Opportunity Knocks	Lou Pesquino	
1991	City of Hope	Zip	
1995	Strange Days	"Tex" Arcana	
1997	The Beautician and the Beast	Denny	Also writer
2002	Death to Smoochy	Skip Kleinman	

=== Television ===
Year	Title	Role	Notes
1975–1977	The Electric Company	Jesse	Main role (seasons 5–6)
1983–1992	ABC Afterschool Specials	Trent / Robby Pols	Episodes: "It's No Crush, I'm in Love", "Summer Stories: The Mall – Part 3"
1995	Chicago Hope	Louis Bagley	Episode: "Growth Pains"
1997	The Nanny	Harvey	Episode: "Danny's Dead and Who's Got the Will?"

== Award nominations ==
- 1984 Tony Award nominee as Featured Actor in a Musical for Baby
- 1984 Won Theatre World Award for Baby (musical)
- 2003 Sundance Film Festival Grand Jury Prize nominee for Camp

== TV ==
- Made in Hollywood: Teen Edition (2012)
- Made in Hollywood (2011)
- Hollywood Singing & Dancing: A Musical History – 1980s, 1990s and 2000s (2009)
- Hollywood Singing & Dancing: A Musical History – 1970's (2009)
- Under Pressure: Making 'The Abyss (1993)

== Writer/Director ==
- Used People (1992; writer only)
- Fly by Night (1993; writer only)
- The Vanishing (1993; writer only)
- Angie (1994; writer only)
- The Beautician and the Beast (1997; writer only)
- Camp (2003; director)
- Bandslam (2009; director)
- Joyful Noise (2012; director)
