= Mark Wilson (comedian) =

Canadian actor and writer

Mark Wilson is a Canadian actor and writer. He was born in St. Catharines, Ontario, Canada.

Mark is best known for:

- The Red Green Show (1991)
- The High Life (1996)
- Fly Away Home (1996)
- The Border (2008)
- Dream House (2011)

Alumnus of The Second City comedy troupe.
