= Jack Saunders =

Jack Saunders may refer to:

- Jack Saunders (Australian cricketer) (1876–1927), Australian cricketer
- Jack Saunders (English cricketer), English cricketer
- Jack Saunders (English footballer), English footballer
- Jack Saunders (Australian footballer), Australian rules player
- Jack Saunders (presenter), British TV and radio presenter
- Jack Saunders (hurdler) (born 1919), American hurdler, bronze medalist at the 1943 USA Outdoor Track and Field Championships
