= The High Life (American TV series) =

- Genre: Sitcom
- Created by: Adam Resnick
- Starring: Mark Wilson; Ernie Grunwald; Robert Joy; Betsy Aidem; Duke Moosekian
- Composer: John Colby
- Country of origin: United States
- Original language: English
- No. of seasons: 1
- No. of episodes: 8

Production
- Camera setup: Single-camera (videotape)
- Running time: 30 minutes
- Production company: Worldwide Pants Incorporated

Original release
- Network: HBO
- Release: November 9 – December 18, 1996

The High Life is a 1996 black-and-white American sitcom starring the Canadian actors Mark Wilson and Robert Joy. It was created and co-written by Adam Resnick. It was produced by David Letterman's Worldwide Pants Incorporated company and played on the HBO network from November 9 to December 18, 1996.

== Premise ==
Mark Wilson and Robert Joy star as the characters Earl and Emmett, respectively, who are two businessmen trying to get rich in 1950s Pittsburgh. The pair are co-owners of a small, struggling storage company called Paradise Storage. The show opens just as Earl's previous business deal, an investment in rock salts, falls apart. In order to recover his losses, Earl comes up with the idea to open the storage company. Earl is outspoken and always looking for quick ways to make a profit, while Emmett acts as his passive sidekick. Emmett was reluctant to join in on the business, but agreed because it was the only way for him to collect a debt Earl owed him. The show is shot in black and white in an attempt to emulate television from the 1950s, and especially the concept of the 1951-53 sitcom Amos 'n' Andy.

== Cast ==
- Robert Joy as Emmett
- Mark Wilson as Earl
- Betsy Aidem as Irene
- Ernie Grunwald as Claude
- Duke Moosekian as Rudy
- Stephen Mellor as multiple characters

== History ==
The show was originally supposed to air on CBS with the title "Emmett and Earl". It was set in present-day but with 1950s characteristics, and proved to be unnecessarily confusing for audiences. When CBS tested a pilot episode, the resulting numbers were disappointing, and CBS dropped the deal. The show's creator, Adam Resnick, then sent a version of the pilot to HBO's head of programming, Chris Albrecht. Albrecht reportedly loved the show and invited Resnick to produce 10 episodes in HBO's studios exactly the way it had been pitched: in black and white, with just one camera, and set in the 1950s. But despite initial positivity, the HBO version of The High Life faced challenges from very early on. For monetary reasons, the studio hired an entirely non-unionized cast and crew, for which Resnick received negative feedback.

Additionally, both the camera crew and HBO's advertising department had trouble understanding Resnick's vision, and the result was an unusual show that some critics described as being nasty and mean-spirited, for which HBO did not know how to attract the right audience. Eventually, the show hired Peyton Reed, who directed the show's final two episodes and was the only crew member who seemed to understand Resnick's ideas. However, despite Reed's enthusiastic directing, the crew, advertising staff, and cast grew even less cohesive, which led HBO to cut the season from 10 episodes to 8, foreshadowing the show's ultimate cancellation after just 8 episodes. Resnick has expressed disappointment in how the show's fate played out. Not only did its producer, David Letterman support the show, but Resnick believes it could have targeted a specific, dedicated audience had it been advertised properly. He believes the show was prematurely cancelled just as it had started to improve with Reed's directing, and wishes they had been granted a second chance.

The show was one of the first of its kind. Its frequently dark settings, with self-centered, unlikable characters was not commonplace in television before 1996. Shows that are popular today, such as It's Always Sunny in Philadelphia, exhibit some of these same production and writing styles. Resnick also made the risky decision to cast Stephen Mellor as a different antagonist each week, a pattern that is visible in the first season NBC's popular 30 Rock sitcom. These unique attributes aside, the show failed to survive and today, there are very few traces of it available anywhere on the Internet.

== Episodes ==
No.	Title	Directed by	Written by	Original release date
1	"Vacation Money"	Peter Lauer	Adam Resnick	November 9, 1996
Earl is afraid of his wife, Irene, finding out that he used their vacation money to invest in rock salts, so he rents out the storage company in order to earn back the money. The renters identify themselves as a civic group, but turn out to be the Ku Klux Klan. This is problematic for Earl, whose black neighbor had expressed interest in investing in the storage company and was scheduled to visit the site that day.
2	"Crockett Hats"	Peter Lauer	Adam Resnick	November 13, 1996
Earl and Emmett are targeted by a toy company representative when they start selling unauthorized Davy Crockett caps.
3	"The Rose"	Peter Lauer	Adam Resnick	November 20, 1996
Earl's wife bakes a prize-winning cake that vaguely resembles a hammer and sickle symbol and Earl buys Russian-made vodka. The couple is then accused of being communists by followers of McCarthy.
4	"Bowling"	Peter Lauer	John Altschuler & Dave Krinsky	November 27, 1996
When Earl discovers that Irene's cousin, Judith, has a promising talent for bowling, he decides to manage her career.
5	"Funeral"	Damon Santostefano	Vince Calandra	December 4, 1996
Earl is thrilled to find out that Irene's uncle has left them a small inheritance, until he finds out that they are expected to pay for his funeral.
6	"Army Buddy"	Peyton Reed	Vince Calandra	December 11, 1996
One of Earl's old friends from the army, whose arm was amputated after battle, shows up and tells everyone that Earl saved his life during World War II.
7	"Union"	Damon Santostefano	John Altschuler & Dave Krinsky	December 18, 1996
Irene's nephew (Kutzy Claude), the only employee of the storage company, is targeted by a determined union worker who tries to convince him to join the organization.
8	"Vending Machine"	Peyton Reed	Vince Calandra	December 25, 1996
Earl decides to get a vending machine for his office and plans to donate the proceeds to charity. When Irene finds out about the vending machine, she and her friends start to hang around the office very often.
