= Painted Angels =

- Directed by: Jon Sanders
- Written by: Anna Mottram; Jon Sanders
- Produced by: Laurence Bowen; Scott Garvie
- Starring: Brenda Fricker; Kelly McGillis; Meret Becker; Bronagh Gallagher
- Cinematography: Gerald Packer
- Edited by: Maysoon Pachachi
- Music by: Douglas Finch
- Production companies: BBC Films; Telefilm Canada; Shaftesbury Films; SaskFilm; Greenpoint Films; Heartland Motion Pictures
- Distributed by: Artificial Eye (UK); Cinepix Film Properties (Canada); Lions Gate Films (US)
- Release date: 4 February 1998 (International Film Festival Rotterdam)
- Running time: 108 minutes
- Countries: United Kingdom; Canada
- Language: English

Painted Angels (1997) (US: The Wicked Wicked West) is a film by Jon Sanders starring Brenda Fricker, Kelly McGillis, Meret Becker, Bronagh Gallagher, Lisa Jakub and Anna Mottram.

The film was shot in Saskatchewan, Canada, and follows the lives of several women in a brothel in a midwestern prairie town in the 1870s. It premièred at the International Film Festival Rotterdam and was released in cinemas in the UK by Artificial Eye in February 1999 and on video in June 1999.
