= John Saunders (cricketer) =

English cricketer & educator (born 1936)

Personal information
- Full name: John Graham Saunders
- Born: 30 November 1936 (age 89); Johannesburg, Transvaal, South Africa
- Batting: Right-handed
- Bowling: Right-arm off break

Domestic team information
- Years: Team
- 1966: Oxford University

Career statistics
Competition	First-class
Matches	2
Runs scored	48
Batting average	16.00
100s/50s	–/–
Top score	47*
Balls bowled	591
Wickets	10
Bowling average	16.30
5 wickets in innings	2
10 wickets in match	1
Best bowling	5/50
Catches/stumpings	1/–
- Source: Cricinfo, 3 July 2020

John Graham Saunders (born 30 November 1936) is a South African-born English first-class cricketer and academic.

Saunders was born at Johannesburg in November 1936. He was educated at Hilton College, before going to England to study medicine at Worcester College, Oxford though at the end of his freshman year he decided to change from medicine to study English, due largely to undiagnosed dyspraxia which affected his co-ordination during surgical procedures. While studying at Oxford, he made two appearances in first-class cricket for Oxford University against Lancashire and Leicestershire in 1966. An off break bowler, he took 10 wickets against Lancashire, with a five wicket haul in both Lancashire innings', to claim match figures of 10 for 102.

After graduating from Oxford, Saunders became an academic, lecturing for over thirty years at the University of Chichester.
