= Jon Sanders (director) =

British film director (born 1943)

Jon Sanders (born 1 April 1943 in Kent) is a British film director. His first feature film Painted Angels was released in 1997.

After Cambridge, Sanders studied film at the Slade School of Fine Art under Thorold Dickinson. As a sound recordist he worked on From Mao to Mozart: Isaac Stern in China which won the 1981 Academy Award for best feature-length documentary.

In the 1980s he made documentaries for television which included Then When the World Changed (1983) for Channel 4, co-directed with cameraman Roger Deakins.

== Directing ==
Sanders' feature film Painted Angels starring Kelly McGillis and Brenda Fricker was about the lives of prostitutes in the Wild West. It premièred at the International Film Festival Rotterdam.
