= Jack Saunders (English cricketer) =

English cricketer

Personal information
- Full name: John Saunders
- Batting: Left-handed

Domestic team information
- Years: Team
- 1895–1900: Buckinghamshire
- 1891: Middlesex

Career statistics
Competition	First-class
Matches	2
Runs scored	16
Batting average	8.00
100s/50s	–/–
Top score	7*
Balls bowled	–
Wickets	–
Bowling average	–
5 wickets in innings	–
10 wickets in match	–
Best bowling	–
Catches/stumpings	–/–
- Source: Cricinfo, 11 May 2011

John Saunders (born in the 19th-century) was an English cricketer. Saunders was a left-handed batsman.

Saunders made his first-class debut for Middlesex against Somerset in the 1891 County Championship. He played a further first-class match in that season against Kent. In his 2 matches he scored 16 runs at a batting average of 8.00, with a high score of 7*.

He made his debut for Buckinghamshire in the 1895 Minor Counties Championship against Oxfordshire. He played Minor counties cricket for Buckinghamshire from 1895 to 1900, which included 44 Minor Counties Championship matches.
