= Get a Life (American TV series) =

American television series (1990–1992)

- Region 1 DVD cover of the complete series
- Genre: Sitcom; Black comedy Surreal comedy
- Created by: Chris Elliott; Adam Resnick; David Mirkin
- Starring: Chris Elliott; Sam Robards; Robin Riker; Elinor Donahue; Bob Elliott; Taylor Fry; Brady Bluhm; Brian Doyle-Murray
- Theme music composer: R.E.M.
- Opening theme: "Stand"
- Composer: Stewart Levin
- Country of origin: United States
- Original language: English
- No. of seasons: 2
- No. of episodes: 35 (+1 unaired pilot) (list of episodes)

Production
- Executive producer: David Mirkin
- Producers: David Latt; Chris Elliott; Adam Resnick; Steve Pepoon
- Production locations: Universal Studios Hollywood, Universal City, California (pilot); Sunset Gower Studios, Hollywood, California (season 1); Radford Studio Center, Studio City, California (season 2)
- Running time: 30 minutes
- Production companies: Elliottland Productions; Mirkinvision; New World Television (1990–1991); TriStar Television (1991–1992)

Original release
- Network: Fox
- Release: September 23, 1990 – March 8, 1992

Get a Life is an American television sitcom that aired on the Fox from September 23, 1990, to March 8, 1992. The show stars Chris Elliott as a 30-year-old paperboy named Chris Peterson. Peterson is a charmless, oblivious and irresponsible manchild who lives in an apartment above his parents' garage (Elliott's parents are played by Elinor Donahue and his real-life father, comedian Bob Elliott) and often wreaks havoc on their lives and the lives of people around them. The opening credits depict Chris Peterson delivering newspapers on his bike to the show's theme song, "Stand" by R.E.M.

The show was created by Elliott, Adam Resnick (like Elliott, a writer for Late Night with David Letterman), and writer/director David Mirkin (former executive producer/showrunner for Newhart and later for The Simpsons). Mirkin was executive producer/showrunner of the series and also directed most of the episodes. Notable writers of the series included Charlie Kaufman, screenwriter of Being John Malkovich; and Bob Odenkirk, co-creator of Mr. Show with Bob and David and Tenacious D.

The show was unconventional for a prime time sitcom, and many of its storylines were surreal, with Elliott's character dying in multiple episodes. For this reason, it was a struggle for Elliott and Mirkin to get the show on the air. Fox executives hated the show, thought it was too disturbing, and found Elliott's character to be too unlikeable and insane.

After only two VHS/DVD volumes were released, Shout! Factory released the complete series on September 18, 2012—the first time all of the show's episodes were made commercially available.

== Synopsis ==
Chris Peterson is a carefree, childlike bachelor who refuses to live the life of an adult. At the age of 30, Chris still lives with his parents in St Paul, Minnesota and maintains a career delivering the St. Paul Pioneer Press, a job that he has held since his youth. He has no driver's license (instead, riding his bicycle wherever he goes) and is depicted as being immature, reckless, gullible, foolish, irresponsible, and extremely dimwitted. His low intelligence is exaggerated to absurd levels: in one episode he tries to leave his parents' house, but is unable to operate the front door. In another he fell out of an airplane after opening the airlock, believing that the "EXIT" sign was a restroom.

Chris' parents (Fred and Gladys Peterson) are an elderly retired couple who are almost always seen in their pajamas and robes (even when they leave the house). They are often shown engaging in bizarre non-sequitur activities like polishing handguns, or trying to shoot a deer that ate flower bulbs in their garden. Gladys (Elinor Donahue) is a smiling, caring mother who dotes over Chris, though she often makes sardonic, passive-aggressive comments about him and his lifestyle. Fred (Bob Elliott) is a brusque, sarcastic old man, who is constantly exasperated by his son and seems to have a reckless disregard for Chris' well-being (on one occasion, Chris demonstrated how his father taught him to use a shotgun by placing the barrel in his mouth).

In early episodes, Chris wanted little more than to spend his days reliving his childhood with his father and his best friend, Larry Potter (Sam Robards). Larry was Chris' friend from childhood, but unlike Chris, Larry has since "grown up", owns a house, works a dead-end job as an accountant, and has two children and a wife, Sharon Potter (Robin Riker). Sharon is overbearing and does not want her husband associating with Chris, preferring instead that he make friends with more sophisticated socialites that fit the image she wishes to portray. Sharon despises Chris, and Chris enjoys irritating her. Larry is envious of Chris' carefree lifestyle and is often coerced by Chris into joining him in his adventures, despite his wife's wishes. To Chris' dismay, Larry eventually heeds his advice and leaves his wife and children at the beginning of the second season. This leaves Sharon traumatized, and she becomes more and more obsessed with killing Chris in revenge.

In a defiant nod to Fox Network demands that his character "be more independent", Chris Peterson was moved out of his parents' house at the beginning of the second season, much to his parents' amazement and joy, and into the garage of ex-cop Gus Borden, played by Brian Doyle-Murray, who had been fired from the police force for urinating on his boss. Gus is a cranky, demeaning sociopath with minimal tolerance for Chris' antics, to which Chris seems oblivious, while looking up to Gus as a sort of paternal figure. Gus serves as Chris' comic foil throughout the second season.

One of the more memorable episodes featured a character named Spewey the Alien (a parody of the films Mac and Me and E.T.), an extraterrestrial who secretes mucus from under his scales (which Chris proceeds to drink and call the "nectar of the Gods") and projectile vomits when he becomes emotionally overwrought. At the end of the episode, Chris and Gus barbecued and ate Spewey, although the creature was resurrected inside their refrigerator.

== Episodes ==
Season	Episodes	Originally released	
Season	Episodes	First released	Last released
1	22	September 23, 1990	May 19, 1991
2	13	November 9, 1991	March 8, 1992

== Development ==
In the DVD commentary for the series by David Mirkin, he discusses the development of the Chris Peterson character and the series in great detail. Mirkin states that the Chris Peterson character was originally somewhat based on Dennis the Menace, i.e. "What would Dennis The Menace have been like when he was 30 years old?" In the pilot, "Terror on the Hell Loop 2000", Chris Peterson was a fully functioning, wisecracking adult who is beating the system. However, as the series went on, he became a darker, more psychotic character. According to Mirkin, the main character was made more likeable in the pilot to get the network to agree to order the series and, once the series was ordered, the producers took the character in the darker direction that was always intended.

Mirkin explains that the series itself was both an homage to the sitcoms of the 1960s and 1970s as well as a subversive farce of the genre. Ultimately, Chris Peterson was a modern, borderline psychotic inhabiting a world of standard sitcom characters from a prior era. In particular, his main foil, Sharon, dresses and acts like a standard sitcom character from the 1960s. Her house is a standard sitcom set, and she has a standard sitcom family. The town is inhabited by standard sitcom archetypes, often played by well-recognized character actors from that era (e.g. James Hampton from F Troop and Graham Jarvis from Mary Hartman, Mary Hartman). A particular homage to that era of sitcoms is that the same actors would play different minor characters, only episodes apart. Mirkin also noted that the use of the original house from The Munsters as a backdrop at the end of the show's opening credits was another homage to the genre.

According to Mirkin, the network executives did not understand a lot of the more surreal, violent content of the scripts but nevertheless allowed it to go ahead. This enabled the writers to proceed with limited interference. However, the studio did not want the episode "Spewey and Me" to be aired, largely on the grounds of the alien being disgusting and getting eaten by Chris and Gus. Written as a parody of science-fiction films E.T. the Extra-Terrestrial and Mac and Me, the show's creators intended it to be a hopeful story of rebirth, hence the alien's resurrection at the end. However, Peter Chernin, who was in charge of Fox, proclaimed the episode to be one of the series' funniest and ensured that it would be broadcast.

When the series was picked up for a second season, Bob Elliot announced he did not wish to return as the father character Fred Peterson. According to co-star Elinor Donahue, the senior Elliot did not enjoy being away from his regular home and life in Maine, and his attitude was made worse by a burglary of his rented Los Angeles home during the first season. He was convinced to film enough insert scenes with Donahue to allow several appearances in the early part of the second season, with their final appearance occurring in the episode "Prisoner of Love." Both continued to be credited in the opening titles for the remainder of the season.

Had the show continued beyond its second season, Elliot, Mirkin and Resnick would have depicted Chris becoming a hobo, which would drop Fred, Gladys, Gus, and the other characters from the storyline. As Mirkin explained, he wanted to do a series that changed every year and did something different each season; "Chris would have moved out of Gus' garage and become a homeless drifter. And he would have traveled the country, in every place touching someone else's life and making it a little bit worse." .

== Reruns ==
The show was rerun in 2000 on the USA Network, although the series was only partially shown, and the theme song "Stand" by R.E.M. was replaced by generic music to avoid royalties for each playing of the theme. Occasionally, however, episodes aired with the correct theme.

Beginning in 2025, Shout! Factory would run the show through its ad-supported video on demand service Shout! TV, premiering it on the weekend of December 6 and 7 with a marathon of the entire show through the service's livestream and retaining the R.E.M. theme song.

== Home media ==
Rhino Home Video released the best of on VHS and DVD – four VHS tapes with two episodes each and two DVDs with four episodes each, as well as one or two bonus features. The eight episodes on VHS are the same as the ones on the DVDs. The DVDs were released in 2000 and 2002 respectively.

Shout! Factory released the complete series on September 18, 2012. Although Chris Elliott stated in 2005 that he had recorded commentary tracks with Adam Resnick, none of Elliott's and Resnick's commentaries were used; they were substituted with commentaries by David Mirkin, and Mirkin is similarly the only creator present in the DVD set's extras.

It was noted by Mirkin that the reason the full DVD box set took so long to release is that the original producers of the show felt that all of the incidental music was very important to the series. They didn't want to release the series until all the rights to the songs had been secured and the series could be released with all of the original music intact.

== Legacy ==
Hip hop producer Dan "the Automator" Nakamura is a noted fan of the series, stating "it was probably one of the best shows on television". Handsome Boy Modeling School, consisting of Nakamura and "Prince Paul" Huston, is named after the series, and other works by Nakamura have referenced both Get a Life and Cabin Boy. Tom Scharpling and Jon Wurster of The Best Show on WFMU became friends due to their mutual appreciation of Get a Life.

The Built to Spill song "Get a Life" on the album Ultimate Alternative Wavers references the show and includes the lyric "Chris went right over their heads".
