= Adam Resnick =

American director, producer and writer

- Born: United States
- Occupations: Director, producer, writer
- Known for: writing for Late Night with David Letterman

Adam Resnick is an American comedy writer from Harrisburg, Pennsylvania. He is best known for his work writing for Late Night with David Letterman.

He co-created and wrote for Get a Life with Chris Elliott. Resnick also wrote and was co-executive producer of a season of The Larry Sanders Show for HBO. He created and wrote The High Life (1996), also for HBO. Also for television, he has written for Saturday Night Live, and is a writer and consulting producer on Divorce.

Resnick has also written for film. With its star, Chris Elliott, Resnick created the story for the 1994 motion picture Cabin Boy, for which he wrote the screenplay. Resnick wrote the screenplays for Lucky Numbers (2000), starring John Travolta and Lisa Kudrow, and Death to Smoochy (2002), directed by Danny DeVito.

Will Not Attend, a pseudo-memoir, was released in 2014. Kirkus Reviews called the book "a neurotic, unapologetic, hilarious collection."

== Filmography ==
=== Film ===
Year	Title	Writer	Director
1994	Cabin Boy	Yes	Yes
2000	Lucky Numbers	Yes	No
2002	Death to Smoochy	Yes	No

=== Television ===
Year	Title	Creator	Writer	Producer	Notes
1986-1990, 1991-1992	Late Night with David Letterman	No	Yes	No	
1987	Action Family	No	No	No	Special thanks credit
1990-1992	Get a Life	Yes	Yes	Yes	
1994-1995	Saturday Night Live	No	Yes	No	
1996	The High Life	Yes	Yes	Yes	
1997-1998	The Larry Sanders Show	No	Yes	Yes	
2003	The Mayor	Yes	Yes	Yes	The WB pilot
2009	Cop House	Yes	Yes	Yes	Fox pilot
2009-2010	Bored to Death	No	No	No	Consultant role
2016-2019	Divorce	No	Yes	Yes	
