= Producers Guild of America Awards =

Film award

- Current: 37th Producers Guild of America Awards
- Awarded for: Excellence in motion picture, television and emerging media productions by members of the Producers Guild of America
- Country: United States
- Presented by: PGA
- Formerly called: Golden Laurel Award
- First award: 1990
- Website: www.producersguild.org

The Producers Guild of America Awards were originally established in 1990 by the Producers Guild of America (PGA) as the Golden Laurel Awards, created by PGA Treasurer Joel Freeman with the support of Guild President Leonard Stern, in order to honor the visionaries who produce and execute motion picture and television product. The ceremony has been hosted each year by celebrity host/presenters, including Nick Clooney, Michael Douglas, Robert Guillaume, James Earl Jones, Jack Lemmon, Shirley MacLaine, Garry Marshall, Walter Matthau, Ronald Reagan, Marlo Thomas, Grant Tinker, Ted Turner, and Karen S. Kramer among others.

== Ceremonies ==
Edition	Date	Location	Best Theatrical Motion Picture
1st Golden Laurel Awards	March 28, 1990	Beverly Wilshire Hotel	Driving Miss Daisy
2nd Golden Laurel Awards	March 5, 1991	Beverly Wilshire Hotel	Dances with Wolves
3rd Golden Laurel Awards	March 4, 1992	Beverly Wilshire Hotel	The Silence of the Lambs
4th Golden Laurel Awards	March 3, 1993	Beverly Wilshire Hotel	The Crying Game
5th Golden Laurel Awards	March 2, 1994	Beverly Wilshire Hotel	Schindler's List
6th Golden Laurel Awards	March 8, 1995	Beverly Wilshire Hotel	Forrest Gump
7th Golden Laurel Awards	March 6, 1996	Beverly Wilshire Hotel	Apollo 13
8th Golden Laurel Awards	March 12, 1997	Universal Hilton Hotel	The English Patient
9th Golden Laurel Awards	March 3, 1998	The Beverly Hilton	Titanic
10th Golden Laurel Awards	March 3, 1999	The Century Plaza Hotel	Saving Private Ryan
11th Golden Laurel Awards	March 2, 2000	The Century Plaza Hotel	American Beauty
12th Golden Laurel Awards	March 3, 2001	The Century Plaza Hotel	Gladiator
13th Producers Guild of America Awards	March 3, 2002	The Century Plaza Hotel	Moulin Rouge!
14th Producers Guild of America Awards	March 2, 2003	The Century Plaza Hotel	Chicago
15th Producers Guild of America Awards	January 17, 2004	The Century Plaza Hotel	The Lord of the Rings: The Return of the King
16th Producers Guild of America Awards	January 22, 2005	Culver Studios	The Aviator
17th Producers Guild of America Awards	January 22, 2006	Universal Hilton Hotel	Brokeback Mountain
18th Producers Guild of America Awards	January 20, 2007	The Century Plaza Hotel	Little Miss Sunshine
19th Producers Guild of America Awards	February 2, 2008	The Beverly Hilton	No Country for Old Men
20th Producers Guild of America Awards	January 24, 2009	Hollywood Palladium	Slumdog Millionaire
21st Producers Guild of America Awards	January 24, 2010	Hollywood Palladium	The Hurt Locker
22nd Producers Guild of America Awards	January 22, 2011	The Beverly Hilton	The King's Speech
23rd Producers Guild of America Awards	January 21, 2012	The Beverly Hilton	The Artist
24th Producers Guild of America Awards	January 26, 2013	The Beverly Hilton	Argo
25th Producers Guild of America Awards	January 19, 2014	The Beverly Hilton	12 Years a Slave & Gravity
26th Producers Guild of America Awards	January 24, 2015	The Century Plaza Hotel	Birdman or (The Unexpected Virtue of Ignorance)
27th Producers Guild of America Awards	January 23, 2016	The Century Plaza Hotel	The Big Short
28th Producers Guild of America Awards	January 28, 2017	The Beverly Hilton	La La Land
29th Producers Guild of America Awards	January 20, 2018	The Beverly Hilton	The Shape of Water
30th Producers Guild of America Awards	January 19, 2019	The Beverly Hilton	Green Book
31st Producers Guild of America Awards	January 18, 2020	Hollywood Palladium	1917
32nd Producers Guild of America Awards	March 24, 2021	Virtual ceremony	Nomadland
33rd Producers Guild of America Awards	March 19, 2022	The Century Plaza Hotel	CODA
34th Producers Guild of America Awards	February 25, 2023	The Beverly Hilton	Everything Everywhere All at Once
35th Producers Guild of America Awards	February 25, 2024	Ovation Hollywood	Oppenheimer
36th Producers Guild of America Awards	February 8, 2025	Fairmont Century Plaza	Anora
37th Producers Guild of America Awards	February 28, 2026	Fairmont Century Plaza	One Battle After Another

== Producers of the Year Awards ==
* Denotes a film that also won a corresponding Academy Award

=== Film winners ===
==== Best Theatrical Motion Picture ====
- 1989: Driving Miss Daisy *

by producers Lili Fini Zanuck and Richard D. Zanuck

- 1990: Dances with Wolves *

by producers Jim Wilson and Kevin Costner

- 1991: The Silence of the Lambs *

by producers Edward Saxon, Kenneth Utt, and Ron Bozman

- 1992: The Crying Game

by producer Stephen Woolley

- 1993: Schindler's List *

by producers Branko Lustig, Gerald R. Molen, and Steven Spielberg

- 1994: Forrest Gump *

by producers Wendy Finerman, Charles Newirth, Steve Starkey, and Steve Tisch

- 1995: Apollo 13

by producers Brian Grazer and Todd Hallowell

- 1996: The English Patient *

by producer Saul Zaentz

- 1997: Titanic *

by producers James Cameron and Jon Landau

- 1998: Saving Private Ryan

by producers Steven Spielberg, Allison Lyon Segan, Bonnie Curtis, Ian Bryce, Mark Gordon, and Gary Levinsohn

- 1999: American Beauty *

by producers Bruce Cohen and Dan Jinks

- 2000: Gladiator *

by producers Branko Lustig and Douglas Wick

- 2001: Moulin Rouge!

by producers Fred Baron, Martin Brown, and Baz Luhrmann

- 2002: Chicago *

by producers Martin Richards

- 2003: The Lord of the Rings: The Return of the King *

by producers Peter Jackson, Barrie M. Osborne, and Fran Walsh

- 2004: The Aviator

by producers Graham King and Michael Mann

- 2005: Brokeback Mountain

by producers Diana Ossana and James Schamus

- 2006: Little Miss Sunshine

by producers Albert Berger, David T. Friendly, Peter Saraf, Marc Turtletaub, and Ron Yerxa

- 2007: No Country for Old Men *

by producers Scott Rudin, Joel Coen, and Ethan Coen

- 2008: Slumdog Millionaire *

by producer Christian Colson

- 2009: The Hurt Locker *

by producers Kathryn Bigelow, Mark Boal, Nicolas Chartier, and Greg Shapiro

- 2010: The King's Speech *

by producers Iain Canning, Emile Sherman, and Gareth Unwin

- 2011: The Artist *

by producer Thomas Langmann

- 2012: Argo *

by producers Grant Heslov, Ben Affleck, and George Clooney

- 2013: 12 Years a Slave * (TIE)

by producers Anthony Katagas, Jeremy Kleiner, Steve McQueen, Brad Pitt, and Dede Gardner

Gravity (TIE)
by producers Alfonso Cuarón and David Heyman

- 2014: Birdman *

by producers Alejandro G. Iñárritu, John Lesher, and James W. Skotchdopole

- 2015: The Big Short

by producers Brad Pitt, Dede Gardner, and Jeremy Kleiner

- 2016: La La Land

by producers Fred Berger, Jordan Horowitz, and Marc Platt

- 2017: The Shape of Water *

by producers Guillermo del Toro and J. Miles Dale

- 2018: Green Book *

by producers Jim Burke, Charles B. Wessler, Brian Hayes Currie, Peter Farrelly and Nick Vallelonga

- 2019: 1917

by producers Sam Mendes, Pippa Harris, Jayne-Ann Tenggren and Callum McDougall

- 2020: Nomadland *

by producers Frances McDormand, Peter Spears, Mollye Asher, Dan Jenvey, Chloé Zhao

- 2021: CODA *

by producers Philippe Rousselet, Fabrice Gianfermi, Patrick Wachsberger

- 2022: Everything Everywhere All at Once *

by producers Jonathan Wang, Dan Kwan, and Daniel Scheinert

- 2023: Oppenheimer *

by producers Christopher Nolan, Charles Roven and Emma Thomas

==== Best Animated Motion Picture ====
- 2005: Wallace & Gromit: The Curse of the Were-Rabbit *

by producers Claire Jennings and Nick Park

- 2006: Cars

by producer Darla K. Anderson

- 2007: Ratatouille *

by producer Brad Lewis

- 2008: WALL-E *

by producer Jim Morris

- 2009: Up *

by producer Jonas Rivera

- 2010: Toy Story 3 *

by producer Darla K. Anderson

- 2011: The Adventures of Tintin

by producers Peter Jackson, Steven Spielberg, and Kathleen Kennedy

- 2012: Wreck-It Ralph

by producer Clark Spencer

- 2013: Frozen *

by producer Peter Del Vecho

- 2014: The Lego Movie

by producer Dan Lin

- 2015: Inside Out *

by producer Jonas Rivera

- 2016: Zootopia *

by producer Clark Spencer

- 2017: Coco *

by producer Darla K. Anderson

- 2018: Spider-Man: Into the Spider-Verse *

by producers Avi Arad, Amy Pascal, Phil Lord and Christopher Miller

- 2019: Toy Story 4 *

by producers Mark Nielsen, and Jonas Rivera

- 2020: Soul *

by producer Dana Murray

- 2021: Encanto *

by producers Yvett Merino and Clark Spencer

- 2022: Guillermo del Toro's Pinocchio *

by producers Guillermo del Toro, Gary Ungar, and Alex Bulkley

- 2023: Spider-Man: Across the Spider-Verse

by producers Avi Arad, Amy Pascal, Phil Lord, Christopher Miller, and Christina Steinberg

- 2024: The Wild Robot

by producer Jeff Hermann

==== Stanley Kramer Award ====
Since 2002, this award has been given for films that "illuminate provocative social issues"

- 2002: I Am Sam

by producers Jessie Nelson, Barbara Hall, Edward Zwick, Marshall Herskovitz, and Richard Solomon

- 2003: Antwone Fisher

by producers Todd Black, Randa Haines, and Denzel Washington

- 2004: In America

by producers Jim Sheridan and Arthur Lappin

- 2005: Hotel Rwanda (TIE)

by producer Terry George

Voces inocentes (Innocent Voices) (TIE)
by producer Lawrence Bender

- 2006: Good Night, and Good Luck.

by producer Grant Heslov

- 2007: An Inconvenient Truth

by producers Lawrence Bender, Scott Z. Burns, and Laurie David

- 2008: The Great Debaters

by producers Todd Black, Kate Forte, Joe Roth, and Oprah Winfrey

- 2009: Milk

by producers Dan Jinks and Bruce Cohen

- 2010: Precious

by producers Lee Daniels, Sarah Siegel-Magness, and Gary Magness

- 2011: Sean Penn

first person to receive a Stanley Kramer Award

- 2012: In the Land of Blood and Honey

by producers Angelina Jolie, Graham King, and Timothy Headington

- 2013: Bully (2011, released in the US in 2012)

by producers Cynthia Lowen, Lee Hirsch, and Cindy Waitt

- 2014: Fruitvale Station

by producers Forest Whitaker and Nina Yang Bongiovi

- 2015: The Normal Heart

by producers Scott Ferguson and Alexis Martin Woodall

- 2016: The Hunting Ground

by producer Amy Ziering

- 2017: Loving

by producers Ged Doherty, Colin Firth, et al.

- 2018: Get Out

by producers Sean McKittrick, Jason Blum, Edward H. Hamm Jr., and Jordan Peele

- 2019: Bombshell

by producers Aaron L. Glibert, Jay Roach, et al.
