= Producers Guild of America Award for Best Theatrical Motion Picture =

Honor awarded to film producers

- Awarded for: Outstanding Production of Theatrical Motion Pictures
- Country: United States
- Presented by: Producers Guild of America
- First award: 1989
- Currently held by: Paul Thomas Anderson, Sara Murphy and Adam Somner for One Battle After Another (2025)

The Producers Guild of America Award for Best Theatrical Motion Picture, also known as the Darryl F. Zanuck Award for Outstanding Producer of Theatrical Motion Pictures, is one of the annual awards given by the Producers Guild of America from 1989.

== Predicting the Oscar's outcome ==
Since its inception the award has predicted the winner of the Academy Award for Best Picture on all but ten occasions:

- 1992 – The Crying Game; lost to Unforgiven
- 1995 – Apollo 13; lost to Braveheart
- 1998 – Saving Private Ryan; lost to Shakespeare in Love
- 2001 – Moulin Rouge!; lost to A Beautiful Mind
- 2004 – The Aviator; lost to Million Dollar Baby
- 2005 – Brokeback Mountain; lost to Crash
- 2006 – Little Miss Sunshine; lost to The Departed
- 2015 – The Big Short; lost to Spotlight
- 2016 – La La Land; lost to Moonlight
- 2019 – 1917; lost to Parasite

== Winners and nominees ==
=== 1980s ===
Year	Film	Producer(s)	Ref.
1989 (1st)	Driving Miss Daisy	Lili Fini Zanuck and Richard D. Zanuck	

=== 1990s ===
Year	Film	Producer(s)	Ref.
1990 (2nd)	Dances with Wolves	Jim Wilson and Kevin Costner	
1991 (3rd)	The Silence of the Lambs	Edward Saxon, Kenneth Utt, and Ron Bozman	
1991 (3rd)	At Play in the Fields of the Lord	Saul Zaentz	
1991 (3rd)	Boyz n the Hood	Steve Nicolaides	
1991 (3rd)	The Commitments	Roger Randall-Cutler and Lynda Myles	
1991 (3rd)	JFK	A. Kitman Ho and Oliver Stone	
1991 (3rd)	The Prince of Tides	Barbra Streisand and Andrew Karsch	
1992 (4th)	The Crying Game	Stephen Woolley	
1992 (4th)	A Few Good Men	Rob Reiner, David Brown, and Andrew Scheinman	
1992 (4th)	Howards End	Ismail Merchant	
1992 (4th)	Scent of a Woman	Martin Brest	
1992 (4th)	Unforgiven	Clint Eastwood and David Valdes	
1993 (5th)	Schindler's List	Steven Spielberg, Gerald R. Molen, and Branko Lustig	
1993 (5th)	The Fugitive	Arnold Kopelson	
1993 (5th)	In the Name of the Father	Jim Sheridan	
1993 (5th)	The Piano	Jan Chapman	
1993 (5th)	The Remains of the Day	Mike Nichols, John Calley, and Ismail Merchant	
1994 (6th)	Forrest Gump	Wendy Finerman, Steve Tisch, and Steve Starkey	
1994 (6th)	Four Weddings and a Funeral	Duncan Kenworthy	
1994 (6th)	Pulp Fiction	Lawrence Bender	
1994 (6th)	Quiz Show	Robert Redford, Michael Jacobs, Julian Krainin, and Michael Nozik	
1994 (6th)	The Shawshank Redemption	Niki Marvin	
1995 (7th)	Apollo 13	Brian Grazer	
1995 (7th)	The American President	Rob Reiner	
1995 (7th)	The Bridges of Madison County	Clint Eastwood and Kathleen Kennedy	
1995 (7th)	Dead Man Walking	Jon Kilik and Tim Robbins	
1995 (7th)	Il Postino: The Postman	Mario Cecchi Gori, Vittorio Cecchi Gori and Gaetano Daniele	
1995 (7th)	Leaving Las Vegas	Lila Cazès and Annie Stewart	
1995 (7th)	Sense and Sensibility	Lindsay Doran	
1996 (8th)	The English Patient	Saul Zaentz	
1996 (8th)	Fargo	Ethan Coen	
1996 (8th)	Hamlet	David Barron	
1996 (8th)	The People vs. Larry Flynt	Oliver Stone, Janet Yang, and Michael Hausman	
1996 (8th)	Shine	Jane Scott	
1997 (9th)	Titanic	James Cameron and Jon Landau	
1997 (9th)	Amistad	Steven Spielberg, Debbie Allen, and Colin Wilson	
1997 (9th)	As Good as It Gets	James L. Brooks, Bridget Johnson, and Kristi Zea	
1997 (9th)	Good Will Hunting	Lawrence Bender	
1997 (9th)	L.A. Confidential	Arnon Milchan, Curtis Hanson, and Michael Nathanson	
1998 (10th)	Saving Private Ryan	Steven Spielberg, Allison Lyon Segan, Bonnie Curtis, Ian Bryce, Mark Gordon, and Gary Levinsohn	
1998 (10th)	Gods and Monsters	Paul Colichman, Gregg Fienberg, and Mark Harris	
1998 (10th)	Life Is Beautiful	Elda Ferri and Gianluigi Braschi	
1998 (10th)	Shakespeare in Love	David Parfitt, Donna Gigliotti, Harvey Weinstein, Edward Zwick, and Marc Norman	
1998 (10th)	Waking Ned	Glynis Murray and Richard Holmes	
1999 (11th)	American Beauty	Bruce Cohen and Dan Jinks	
1999 (11th)	Being John Malkovich	Michael Stipe, Sandy Stern, Steve Golin, and Vincent Landay	
1999 (11th)	The Cider House Rules	Richard N. Gladstein	
1999 (11th)	The Hurricane	Norman Jewison, Armyan Bernstein, and John Ketcham	
1999 (11th)	The Insider	Michael Mann and Pieter Jan Brugge	

=== 2000s ===
Year	Film	Producer(s)	Ref.
2000 (12th)	Gladiator	Douglas Wick and Branko Lustig	
2000 (12th)	Almost Famous	Cameron Crowe and Ian Bryce	
2000 (12th)	Billy Elliot	Greg Brenman and Jon Finn	
2000 (12th)	Crouching Tiger, Hidden Dragon	William Kong, Hsu Li-kong, and Ang Lee	
2000 (12th)	Erin Brockovich	Danny DeVito, Michael Shamberg, and Stacey Sher	
2001 (13th)	Moulin Rouge!	Baz Luhrmann, Fred Baron, and Martin Brown	
2001 (13th)	A Beautiful Mind	Brian Grazer and Ron Howard	
2001 (13th)	Harry Potter and the Sorcerer's Stone	David Heyman	
2001 (13th)	The Lord of the Rings: The Fellowship of the Ring	Barrie M. Osborne, Peter Jackson, and Fran Walsh	
2001 (13th)	Shrek	Aron Warner, John H. Williams, and Jeffrey Katzenberg	
2002 (14th)	Chicago	Martin Richards	
2002 (14th)	Adaptation	Edward Saxon, Jonathan Demme, and Vincent Landay	
2002 (14th)	Gangs of New York	Alberto Grimaldi and Harvey Weinstein	
2002 (14th)	The Lord of the Rings: The Two Towers	Barrie M. Osborne, Peter Jackson, and Fran Walsh	
2002 (14th)	My Big Fat Greek Wedding	Rita Wilson, Tom Hanks, and Gary Goetzman	
2002 (14th)	Road to Perdition	Richard D. Zanuck and Dean Zanuck	
2003 (15th)	The Lord of the Rings: The Return of the King	Barrie M. Osborne, Peter Jackson, and Fran Walsh	
2003 (15th)	Cold Mountain	Albert Berger	
2003 (15th)	The Last Samurai	Marshall Herskovitz, Edward Zwick, Tom Cruise, and Paula Wagner	
2003 (15th)	Master and Commander: The Far Side of the World	Samuel Goldwyn Jr., Duncan Henderson, and Peter Weir	
2003 (15th)	Mystic River	Robert Lorenz, Judie Hoyt, and Clint Eastwood	
2003 (15th)	Seabiscuit	Kathleen Kennedy, Frank Marshall, and Gary Ross	
2004 (16th)	The Aviator	Michael Mann and Graham King	
2004 (16th)	Finding Neverland	Richard N. Gladstein and Nellie Bellflower	
2004 (16th)	The Incredibles	John Walker	
2004 (16th)	Million Dollar Baby	Clint Eastwood, Albert S. Ruddy, and Tom Rosenberg	
2004 (16th)	Sideways	Michael London	
2005 (17th)	Brokeback Mountain	Diana Ossana and James Schamus	
2005 (17th)	Capote	Caroline Baron, William Vince, and Michael Ohoven	
2005 (17th)	Crash	Paul Haggis and Cathy Schulman	
2005 (17th)	Good Night, and Good Luck	Grant Heslov	
2005 (17th)	Walk the Line	James Keach and Cathy Konrad	
2006 (18th)	Little Miss Sunshine	Albert Berger, David T. Friendly, Peter Saraf, Marc Turtletaub, and Ron Yerxa	
2006 (18th)	Babel	Steve Golin, Alejandro González Iñárritu, and Jon Kilik	
2006 (18th)	The Departed	Graham King	
2006 (18th)	Dreamgirls	Laurence Mark	
2006 (18th)	The Queen	Andy Harries, Christine Langan, and Tracey Seaward	
2007 (19th)	No Country for Old Men	Scott Rudin, Joel Coen, and Ethan Coen	
2007 (19th)	The Diving Bell and the Butterfly	Kathleen Kennedy and Jon Kilik	
2007 (19th)	Juno	Lianne Halfon, Mason Novick, and Russell Smith	
2007 (19th)	Michael Clayton	Jennifer Fox, Kerry Orent, and Sydney Pollack	
2007 (19th)	There Will Be Blood	Paul Thomas Anderson, Daniel Lupi, and JoAnne Sellar	
2008 (20th)	Slumdog Millionaire	Christian Colson	
2008 (20th)	The Curious Case of Benjamin Button	Kathleen Kennedy, Frank Marshall, and Ceán Chaffin	
2008 (20th)	The Dark Knight	Christopher Nolan, Emma Thomas, and Charles Roven	
2008 (20th)	Frost/Nixon	Ron Howard, Brian Grazer, and Eric Fellner	
2008 (20th)	Milk	Bruce Cohen and Dan Jinks	
2009 (21st)	The Hurt Locker	Kathryn Bigelow, Mark Boal, Nicolas Chartier, and Greg Shapiro	
2009 (21st)	Avatar	James Cameron and Jon Landau	
2009 (21st)	District 9	Peter Jackson and Carolynne Cunningham	
2009 (21st)	An Education	Finola Dwyer and Amanda Posey	
2009 (21st)	Inglourious Basterds	Lawrence Bender	
2009 (21st)	Invictus	Clint Eastwood, Lori McCreary, Robert Lorenz, and Mace Neufeld	
2009 (21st)	Precious	Lee Daniels, Sarah Siegel-Magness, and Gary Magness	
2009 (21st)	Star Trek	J. J. Abrams and Damon Lindelof	
2009 (21st)	Up	Jonas Rivera	
2009 (21st)	Up in the Air	Ivan Reitman, Jason Reitman, and Daniel Dubiecki	

=== 2010s ===
Year	Film	Producer(s)	Ref.
2010 (22nd)	The King's Speech	Iain Canning, Emile Sherman, and Gareth Unwin	
2010 (22nd)	127 Hours	Danny Boyle and Christian Colson	
2010 (22nd)	Black Swan	Scott Franklin, Mike Medavoy, and Brian Oliver	
2010 (22nd)	The Fighter	David Hoberman, Todd Lieberman, and Mark Wahlberg	
2010 (22nd)	Inception	Christopher Nolan and Emma Thomas	
2010 (22nd)	The Kids Are All Right	Gary Gilbert, Jeffrey Levy-Hinte, and Celine Rattray	
2010 (22nd)	The Social Network	Dana Brunetti, Ceán Chaffin, Michael De Luca, and Scott Rudin	
2010 (22nd)	The Town	Basil Iwanyk and Graham King	
2010 (22nd)	Toy Story 3	Darla K. Anderson	
2010 (22nd)	True Grit	Joel Coen, Ethan Coen, and Scott Rudin	
2011 (23rd)	The Artist	Thomas Langmann	
2011 (23rd)	Bridesmaids	Judd Apatow, Barry Mendel, and Clayton Townsend	
2011 (23rd)	The Descendants	Jim Burke, Alexander Payne, and Jim Taylor	
2011 (23rd)	The Girl with the Dragon Tattoo	Ceán Chaffin and Scott Rudin	
2011 (23rd)	The Help	Michael Barnathan, Chris Columbus, and Brunson Green	
2011 (23rd)	Hugo	Graham King and Martin Scorsese	
2011 (23rd)	The Ides of March	George Clooney, Grant Heslov, and Brian Oliver	
2011 (23rd)	Midnight in Paris	Letty Aronson and Stephen Tenenbaum	
2011 (23rd)	Moneyball	Michael De Luca, Rachael Horovitz, and Brad Pitt	
2011 (23rd)	War Horse	Kathleen Kennedy and Steven Spielberg	
2012 (24th)	Argo	Ben Affleck, George Clooney, and Grant Heslov	
2012 (24th)	Beasts of the Southern Wild	Michael Gottwald, Dan Janvey, and Josh Penn	
2012 (24th)	Django Unchained	Reginald Hudlin, Pilar Savone, and Stacey Sher	
2012 (24th)	Les Misérables	Tim Bevan, Eric Fellner, Debra Hayward, and Cameron Mackintosh	
2012 (24th)	Life of Pi	Ang Lee, Gil Netter, and David Womark	
2012 (24th)	Lincoln	Kathleen Kennedy and Steven Spielberg	
2012 (24th)	Moonrise Kingdom	Wes Anderson, Jeremy Dawson, Steven Rales, and Scott Rudin	
2012 (24th)	Silver Linings Playbook	Bruce Cohen, Donna Gigliotti, and Jonathan Gordon	
2012 (24th)	Skyfall	Barbara Broccoli and Michael G. Wilson	
2012 (24th)	Zero Dark Thirty	Kathryn Bigelow, Mark Boal, and Megan Ellison	
2013 (25th)	12 Years a Slave	Anthony Katagas, Jeremy Kleiner, Steve McQueen, Brad Pitt, and Dede Gardner	
2013 (25th)	Gravity	Alfonso Cuarón and David Heyman	
2013 (25th)	American Hustle	Megan Ellison, Jonathan Gordon, Charles Roven, and Richard Suckle	
2013 (25th)	Blue Jasmine	Letty Aronson and Stephen Tenenbaum	
2013 (25th)	Captain Phillips	Dana Brunetti, Michael De Luca, and Scott Rudin	
2013 (25th)	Dallas Buyers Club	Robbie Brenner and Rachel Winter	
2013 (25th)	Her	Megan Ellison, Spike Jonze, and Vincent Landay	
2013 (25th)	Nebraska	Albert Berger and Ron Yerxa	
2013 (25th)	Saving Mr. Banks	Ian Collie, Alison Owen, and Philip Steuer	
2013 (25th)	The Wolf of Wall Street	Riza Aziz, Emma Tillinger Koskoff, and Joey McFarland	
2014 (26th)	Birdman or (The Unexpected Virtue of Ignorance)	Alejandro G. Iñárritu, John Lesher, and James W. Skotchdopole	
2014 (26th)	American Sniper	Clint Eastwood, Robert Lorenz, Andrew Lazar, Bradley Cooper, and Peter Morgan	
2014 (26th)	Boyhood	Richard Linklater and Cathleen Sutherland	
2014 (26th)	Foxcatcher	Bennett Miller, Megan Ellison, and Jon Kilik	
2014 (26th)	Gone Girl	Ceán Chaffin	
2014 (26th)	The Grand Budapest Hotel	Wes Anderson, Jeremy Dawson, Steven Rales, and Scott Rudin	
2014 (26th)	The Imitation Game	Nora Grossman, Ido Ostrowsky, and Teddy Schwarzman	
2014 (26th)	Nightcrawler	Jennifer Fox and Tony Gilroy	
2014 (26th)	The Theory of Everything	Tim Bevan, Eric Fellner, Lisa Bruce, and Anthony McCarten	
2014 (26th)	Whiplash	Jason Blum, Helen Estabrook, and David Lancaster	
2015 (27th)	The Big Short	Dede Gardner, Jeremy Kleiner, and Brad Pitt	
2015 (27th)	Bridge of Spies	Steven Spielberg, Marc Platt, and Kristie Macosko Krieger	
2015 (27th)	Brooklyn	Finola Dwyer and Amanda Posey	
2015 (27th)	Ex Machina	Andrew Macdonald and Allon Reich	
2015 (27th)	Mad Max: Fury Road	Doug Mitchell and George Miller	
2015 (27th)	The Martian	Simon Kinberg, Ridley Scott, Michael Schaefer, and Mark Huffam	
2015 (27th)	The Revenant	Arnon Milchan, Steve Golin, Alejandro G. Iñárritu, Mary Parent, and Keith Redmon	
2015 (27th)	Sicario	Basil Iwanyk, Edward McDonnell, and Molly Smith	
2015 (27th)	Spotlight	Michael Sugar, Steve Golin, Nicole Rocklin, and Blye Pagon Faust	
2015 (27th)	Straight Outta Compton	O'Shea Jackson, Matt Alvarez, F. Gary Gray, Andre Young, and Scott Bernstein	
2016 (28th)	La La Land	Fred Berger, Jordan Horowitz, and Marc Platt	
2016 (28th)	Arrival	Dan Levine, Shawn Levy, Aaron Ryder, and David Linde	
2016 (28th)	Deadpool	Simon Kinberg, Ryan Reynolds, and Lauren Shuler Donner	
2016 (28th)	Fences	Scott Rudin, Denzel Washington, and Todd Black	
2016 (28th)	Hacksaw Ridge	Bill Mechanic and David Permut	
2016 (28th)	Hell or High Water	Carla Hacken and Julie Yorn	
2016 (28th)	Hidden Figures	Donna Gigliotti, Peter Chernin, Jenno Topping, Pharrell Williams, and Theodore Melfi	
2016 (28th)	Lion	Emile Sherman, Iain Canning, and Angie Fielder	
2016 (28th)	Manchester by the Sea	Matt Damon, Kimberly Steward, Chris Moore, Lauren Beck, and Kevin J. Walsh	
2016 (28th)	Moonlight	Adele Romanski, Dede Gardner, and Jeremy Kleiner	
2017 (29th)	The Shape of Water	Guillermo del Toro and J. Miles Dale	
2017 (29th)	The Big Sick	Judd Apatow and Barry Mendel	
2017 (29th)	Call Me by Your Name	Peter Spears, Luca Guadagnino, Émilie Georges, and Marco Morabito	
2017 (29th)	Dunkirk	Emma Thomas and Christopher Nolan	
2017 (29th)	Get Out	Sean McKittrick, Edward H. Hamm Jr., Jason Blum, and Jordan Peele	
2017 (29th)	I, Tonya	Bryan Unkeless, Steven Rogers, Margot Robbie, and Tom Ackerley	
2017 (29th)	Lady Bird	Scott Rudin, Eli Bush, and Evelyn O'Neill	
2017 (29th)	Molly's Game	Mark Gordon, Amy Pascal, and Matt Jackson	
2017 (29th)	The Post	Amy Pascal, Steven Spielberg, and Kristie Macosko Krieger	
2017 (29th)	Three Billboards Outside Ebbing, Missouri	Graham Broadbent, Pete Czernin, and Martin McDonagh	
2017 (29th)	Wonder Woman	Charles Roven, Richard Suckle, Zack Snyder, and Deborah Snyder	
2018 (30th)	Green Book	Jim Burke, Charles B. Wessler, Brian Hayes Currie, Peter Farrelly, and Nick Vallelonga	
2018 (30th)	Black Panther	Kevin Feige	
2018 (30th)	BlacKkKlansman	Sean McKittrick, Jason Blum, Raymond Mansfield, Jordan Peele, and Spike Lee	
2018 (30th)	Bohemian Rhapsody	Graham King	
2018 (30th)	Crazy Rich Asians	Nina Jacobson, Brad Simpson, and John Penotti	
2018 (30th)	The Favourite	Ceci Dempsey, Ed Guiney, Lee Magiday, and Yorgos Lanthimos	
2018 (30th)	A Quiet Place	Michael Bay, Andrew Form, and Bradley Fuller	
2018 (30th)	Roma	Gabriela Rodríguez and Alfonso Cuarón	
2018 (30th)	A Star Is Born	Bill Gerber, Bradley Cooper, and Lynette Howell Taylor	
2018 (30th)	Vice	Dede Gardner, Jeremy Kleiner, Kevin Messick, and Adam McKay	
2019 (31st)	1917	Sam Mendes, Pippa Harris, Jayne-Ann Tenggren, and Callum McDougall	
2019 (31st)	Ford v Ferrari	Peter Chernin, Jenno Topping, and James Mangold	
2019 (31st)	The Irishman	Jane Rosenthal, Robert De Niro, Emma Tillinger Koskoff, and Martin Scorsese	
2019 (31st)	Jojo Rabbit	Carthew Neal and Taika Waititi	
2019 (31st)	Joker	Todd Phillips, Bradley Cooper, and Emma Tillinger Koskoff	
2019 (31st)	Knives Out	Rian Johnson and Ram Bergman	
2019 (31st)	Little Women	Amy Pascal	
2019 (31st)	Marriage Story	Noah Baumbach and David Heyman	
2019 (31st)	Once Upon a Time in Hollywood	David Heyman, Shannon McIntosh, and Quentin Tarantino	
2019 (31st)	Parasite	Kwak Sin-ae and Bong Joon-ho	

=== 2020s ===
Year	Film	Producer(s)	Ref.
2020 (32nd)	Nomadland	Frances McDormand, Peter Spears, Mollye Asher, Dan Janvey, and Chloé Zhao	
2020 (32nd)	Borat Subsequent Moviefilm	Sacha Baron Cohen, Monica Levinson, and Anthony Hines	
2020 (32nd)	Judas and the Black Messiah	Charles King, Ryan Coogler, and Shaka King	
2020 (32nd)	Ma Rainey’s Black Bottom	Denzel Washington and Todd Black	
2020 (32nd)	Mank	Ceán Chaffin, Eric Roth, and Douglas Urbanski	
2020 (32nd)	Minari	Christina Oh	
2020 (32nd)	One Night in Miami...	Jess Wu Calder, Keith Calder, and Jody Klein	
2020 (32nd)	Promising Young Woman	Josey McNamara, Ben Browning, Ashley Fox, Tom Ackerley, and Emerald Fennell	
2020 (32nd)	Sound of Metal	Bert Hamelinck and Sacha Ben Harroche	
2020 (32nd)	The Trial of the Chicago 7	Marc Platt and Stuart Besser	
2021 (33rd)	CODA	Fabrice Gianfermi, Philippe Rousselet, and Patrick Wachsberger	
2021 (33rd)	Being the Ricardos	Todd Black	
2021 (33rd)	Belfast	Laura Berwick, Kenneth Branagh, Becca Kovacik, and Tamar Thomas	
2021 (33rd)	Don't Look Up	Adam McKay and Kevin Messick	
2021 (33rd)	Dune	Mary Parent, Denis Villeneuve, and Cale Boyter	
2021 (33rd)	King Richard	Tim White, Trevor White, and Will Smith	
2021 (33rd)	Licorice Pizza	Sara Murphy, Paul Thomas Anderson, and Adam Somner	
2021 (33rd)	The Power of the Dog	Jane Campion, Tanya Seghatchian, Emile Sherman, Iain Canning, and Roger Frappier	
2021 (33rd)	Tick, Tick... Boom!	Julie Oh and Lin-Manuel Miranda	
2021 (33rd)	West Side Story	Steven Spielberg and Kristie Macosko Krieger	
2022 (34th)	Everything Everywhere All at Once	Jonathan Wang, Dan Kwan, and Daniel Scheinert	
2022 (34th)	Avatar: The Way of Water	Jon Landau and James Cameron	
2022 (34th)	The Banshees of Inisherin	Graham Broadbent, Pete Czernin, and Martin McDonagh	
2022 (34th)	Black Panther: Wakanda Forever	Kevin Feige and Nate Moore	
2022 (34th)	Elvis	Baz Luhrmann, Catherine Martin, Gail Berman, Schuyler Weiss, and Patrick McCormick	
2022 (34th)	The Fabelmans	Steven Spielberg, Kristie Macosko Krieger, and Tony Kushner	
2022 (34th)	Glass Onion: A Knives Out Mystery	Ram Bergman and Rian Johnson	
2022 (34th)	Tár	Todd Field, Alexandra Milchan, and Scott Lambert	
2022 (34th)	Top Gun: Maverick	Jerry Bruckheimer, Tom Cruise, Christopher McQuarrie, and David Ellison	
2022 (34th)	The Whale	Jeremy Dawson, Ari Handel, and Darren Aronofsky	
2023 (35th)	Oppenheimer	Emma Thomas, Charles Roven and Christopher Nolan	
2023 (35th)	American Fiction	Ben LeClair, Nikos Karamigios, Cord Jefferson, and Jermaine Johnson	
2023 (35th)	Anatomy of a Fall	Marie-Ange Luciani and David Thion	
2023 (35th)	Barbie	David Heyman, Margot Robbie, Tom Ackerley, and Robbie Brenner	
2023 (35th)	The Holdovers	Mark Johnson	
2023 (35th)	Killers of the Flower Moon	Dan Friedkin, Bradley Thomas, Martin Scorsese, and Daniel Lupi	
2023 (35th)	Maestro	Bradley Cooper, Steven Spielberg, Fred Berner, Amy Durning, and Kristie Macosko Krieger	
2023 (35th)	Past Lives	David Hinojosa, Christine Vachon, and Pamela Koffler	
2023 (35th)	Poor Things	Ed Guiney, Andrew Lowe, Yorgos Lanthimos, and Emma Stone	
2023 (35th)	The Zone of Interest	James Wilson	
2024 (36th)	Anora	Alex Coco, Samantha Quan and Sean Baker	
2024 (36th)	The Brutalist	Brady Corbet, D.J. Gugenheim, Brian Young, Andrew Morrison and Nick Gordon	
2024 (36th)	A Complete Unknown	James Mangold, Alex Heineman and Fred Berger	
2024 (36th)	Conclave	Tessa Ross, Juliette Howell and Michael Jackman	
2024 (36th)	Dune: Part Two	Mary Parent, Cale Boyter, Tanya Lapointe and Denis Villeneuve	
2024 (36th)	Emilia Pérez	Jacques Audiard and Pascal Caucheteux	
2024 (36th)	A Real Pain	Jesse Eisenberg and Ali Herting	
2024 (36th)	September 5	Philipp Trauer, Thomas Wöbke, Tim Fehlbaum, John Ira Palmer and John Wildermuth	
2024 (36th)	The Substance	Coralie Fargeat, Tim Bevan and Eric Fellner	
2024 (36th)	Wicked	Marc Platt	
2025 (37th)	One Battle After Another	Adam Somner, Sara Murphy and Paul Thomas Anderson	
2025 (37th)	Bugonia	Ed Guiney, Andrew Lowe, Yorgos Lanthimos, Emma Stone and Lars Knudsen	
2025 (37th)	F1	Jerry Bruckheimer, Joseph Kosinski, Brad Pitt, Dede Gardner, Jeremy Kleiner and Chad Oman	
2025 (37th)	Frankenstein	Guillermo Del Toro, J. Miles Dale and Scott Stuber	
2025 (37th)	Hamnet	Liza Marshall, Pippa Harris, Sam Mendes, Steven Spielberg and Nicolas Gonda	
2025 (37th)	Marty Supreme	Eli Bush, Ronald Bronstein, Josh Safdie, Anthony Katagas and Timothée Chalamet	
2025 (37th)	Sentimental Value	Maria Ekerhovd and Andrea Berentsen Ottmar	
2025 (37th)	Sinners	Ryan Coogler, Zinzi Coogler and Sev Ohanian	
2025 (37th)	Train Dreams	Marissa McMahon, Teddy Schwarzman, William Janowitz, Ashley Schlaifer and Michael Heimler	
2025 (37th)	Weapons	Zach Cregger and Miri Yoon	

== Multiple nominations and wins ==
Producers with at least one win and at least two nominations
Wins	Nominations	Name (Year)
2	11	Steven Spielberg (1993, 1997, 1998, 2011, 2012, 2015, 2017, 2021, 2022, 2024, 2025)
2	5	Jeremy Kleiner (2013, 2015, 2016, 2018, 2025)
2	5	Dede Gardner (2013, 2015, 2016, 2018, 2025)
2	4	Brad Pitt (2011, 2013, 2015, 2025)
2	2	Branko Lustig (1993, 2000)
1	9	Scott Rudin (2007, 2010, 2011, 2012, 2013, 2014, 2016, 2017)
1	5	Graham King (2004, 2006, 2010, 2011, 2018)
1	4	David Heyman (2001, 2013, 2019)
1	4	Peter Jackson (2001, 2002, 2003, 2009)
1	4	Christopher Nolan (2008, 2010, 2017, 2023)
1	4	Emma Thomas (2008, 2010, 2017, 2023)
1	4	Charles Roven (2008, 2013, 2017, 2023)
1	4	Marc Platt (2015, 2016, 2020, 2024)
1	3	Brian Grazer (1995, 2001, 2008)
1	3	James Cameron (1997, 2009, 2022)
1	3	Jon Landau (1997, 2009, 2022)
1	3	Ethan Coen (1996, 2007, 2010)
1	3	Bruce Cohen (1999, 2008, 2012)
1	3	Barrie M. Osborne (2001, 2002, 2003)
1	3	Fran Walsh (2001, 2002, 2003)
1	3	Albert Berger (2003, 2006, 2013)
1	3	Grant Heslov (2005, 2011, 2012)
1	3	Alejandro G. Iñárritu (2006, 2014, 2015)
1	3	Paul Thomas Anderson (2007, 2021, 2025)
1	3	Iain Canning (2010, 2016, 2021)
1	3	Emile Sherman (2010, 2016, 2021)
1	2	Richard D. Zanuck (1989, 2002)
1	2	Saul Zaentz (1991, 1996)
1	2	Edward Saxon (1991, 2002)
1	2	Ian Bryce (1998, 2000)
1	2	Mark Gordon (1998, 2017)
1	2	Michael Mann (1999, 2004)
1	2	Dan Jinks (1999, 2008)
1	2	Baz Luhrmann (2001, 2022)
1	2	Ron Yerxa (2006, 2013)
1	2	Joel Coen (2007, 2010)
1	2	Christian Colson (2008, 2010)
1	2	Kathryn Bigelow (2009, 2012)
1	2	Mark Boal (2009, 2012)
1	2	George Clooney (2011, 2012)
1	2	Jim Burke (2011, 2018)
1	2	Dan Janvey (2012, 2020)
1	2	Alfonso Cuarón (2013, 2018)
1	2	Peter Spears (2017, 2020)
1	2	Sara Murphy (2021, 2025)
1	2	Adam Somner (2021, 2025)

Producers with no win and at least two nominations
Wins	Nominations	Name (Year)
0	6	Clint Eastwood (1992, 1995, 2003, 2004, 2009, 2014)
0	6	Kathleen Kennedy (1995, 2003, 2007, 2008, 2011, 2012)
0	5	Ceán Chaffin (2008, 2010, 2011, 2014, 2020)
0	4	Jon Kilik (1995, 2006, 2007, 2014)
0	4	Steve Golin (1999, 2006, 2015)
0	4	Megan Ellison (2012, 2013, 2014)
0	4	Kristie Macosko Krieger (2015, 2017, 2021, 2022)
0	3	Lawrence Bender (1994, 1997, 2009)
0	3	Donna Gigliotti (1998, 2012, 2016)
0	3	Vincent Landay (1999, 2002, 2013)
0	3	Robert Lorenz (2003, 2009, 2014)
0	3	Eric Fellner (2008, 2012, 2014)
0	3	Michael De Luca (2010, 2011, 2013)
0	3	Jeremy Dawson (2012, 2014, 2022)
0	3	Emma Tillinger Koskoff (2013, 2019)
0	3	Jason Blum (2014, 2017, 2018)
0	3	Bradley Cooper (2014, 2018, 2019)
0	3	Amy Pascal (2017, 2019)
0	3	Todd Black (2016, 2020, 2021)
0	2	Oliver Stone (1991, 1996)
0	2	Ismail Merchant (1992, 1993)
0	2	Rob Reiner (1992, 1995)
0	2	Arnon Milchan (1997, 2015)
0	2	Harvey Weinstein (1998, 2002)
0	2	Edward Zwick (1998, 2003)
0	2	Richard N. Gladstein (1999, 2004)
0	2	Ang Lee (2000, 2012)
0	2	Stacey Sher (2000, 2012)
0	2	Ron Howard (2001, 2008)
0	2	Frank Marshall (2003, 2008)
0	2	Tom Cruise (2003, 2022)
0	2	Jennifer Fox (2007, 2014)
0	2	Finola Dwyer (2009, 2015)
0	2	Amanda Posey (2009, 2015)
0	2	Brian Oliver (2010, 2011)
0	2	Dana Brunetti (2010, 2013)
0	2	Basil Iwanyk (2010, 2015)
0	2	Letty Aronson (2011, 2013)
0	2	Emma Stone (2023, 2025)
0	2	Stephen Tenenbaum (2011, 2013)
0	2	Judd Apatow (2011, 2017)
0	2	Barry Mendel (2011, 2017)
0	2	Martin Scorsese (2011, 2019)
0	2	Jonathan Gordon (2012, 2013)
0	2	Tim Bevan (2012, 2014)
0	2	Wes Anderson (2012, 2014)
0	2	Steven Rales (2012, 2014)
0	2	Richard Suckle (2013, 2017)
0	2	Simon Kinberg (2015, 2016)
0	2	Mary Parent (2015, 2021)
0	2	Peter Chernin (2016, 2019)
0	2	Jenno Topping (2016, 2019)
0	2	Denzel Washington (2016, 2020)
0	2	Sean McKittrick (2017, 2018)
0	2	Jordan Peele (2017, 2018)
0	2	Tom Ackerley (2017, 2020)
0	2	Graham Broadbent (2017, 2022)
0	2	Pete Czernin (2017, 2022)
0	2	Martin McDonagh (2017, 2022)
0	2	Adam McKay (2018, 2021)
0	2	Kevin Messick (2018, 2021)
0	2	Kevin Feige (2018, 2022)
0	2	Ram Bergman (2019, 2022)
0	2	Rian Johnson (2019, 2022)
0	2	James Mangold (2019, 2024)
0	2	Denis Villeneuve (2021, 2024)

== Notes ==
- Since the inception of the Producers Guild of America Award for Best Theatrical Motion Picture, four animated films have been nominated:
1. 2001 Shrek (lost to Moulin Rouge!)
2. 2004 The Incredibles (lost to The Aviator)
3. 2009 Up (lost to The Hurt Locker)
4. 2010 Toy Story 3 (lost to The King's Speech)
