= 26th Producers Guild of America Awards =

26th Annual Producers Guild Awards
- Date: January 24, 2015
- Location: Hyatt Regency Century Plaza, Los Angeles, California
- Country: United States
- Presented by: Producers Guild of America

Highlights
- Best Producer(s) Motion Picture: Birdman – Alejandro G. Iñárritu, John Lesher, and James W. Skotchdopole
- Best Producer(s) Animated Feature: The Lego Movie – Dan Lin and Roy Lee
- Best Producer(s) Documentary Motion Picture: Life Itself – Steve James, Zak Piper, and Garrett Basch
- Website: https://www.producersguild.org

The 26th Producers Guild of America Awards (also known as 2015 Producers Guild Awards), honoring the best film and television producers of 2014, were held at the Hyatt Regency Century Plaza in Los Angeles, California on January 24, 2015. The nominations for documentary film, television, and digital categories were announced on December 1, 2014. The nominees for motion picture, animated feature, and long-form television were announced on January 5, 2015.

== Winners and nominees ==
=== Film ===
Darryl F. Zanuck Award for Outstanding Producer of Theatrical Motion Pictures
- Birdman or (The Unexpected Virtue of Ignorance) (Fox Searchlight Pictures) – Alejandro G. Iñárritu, John Lesher, and James W. Skotchdopole
  - American Sniper (Warner Bros Pictures) – Clint Eastwood, Robert Lorenz, Andrew Lazar, Bradley Cooper, and Peter Morgan
  - Boyhood (IFC Films) – Richard Linklater and Cathleen Sutherland
  - Foxcatcher (Sony Pictures Classics) – Megan Ellison, Bennett Miller, and Jon Kilik
  - Gone Girl (20th Century Fox) – Ceán Chaffin
  - The Grand Budapest Hotel (Fox Searchlight Pictures) – Wes Anderson, Scott Rudin, Jeremy Dawson, and Steven Rales
  - The Imitation Game (The Weinstein Company) – Nora Grossman, Ido Ostrowsky, and Teddy Schwarzman
  - Nightcrawler (Open Road Films) – Jennifer Fox and Tony Gilroy
  - The Theory of Everything (Focus Features) – Tim Bevan, Eric Fellner, Lisa Bruce, and Anthony McCarten
  - Whiplash (Sony Pictures Classics) – Jason Blum, Helen Estabrook, and David Lancaster
Outstanding Producer of Animated Theatrical Motion Pictures
- The Lego Movie (Warner Bros Pictures) – Dan Lin
  - Big Hero 6 (Walt Disney Animation Studios) – Roy Conli
  - The Book of Life (20th Century Fox) – Brad Booker and Guillermo del Toro
  - The Boxtrolls (Focus Features) – David Ichioka and Travis Knight
  - How to Train Your Dragon 2 (20th Century Fox) – Bonnie Arnold
Outstanding Producer of Documentary Theatrical Motion Pictures
- Life Itself (Magnolia Pictures) – Garrett Basch, Steve James, and Zak Piper
  - The Green Prince (Music Box Films) – John Battsek, Simon Chinn, and Nadav Schirman
  - Merchants of Doubt (Sony Pictures Classics) – Robert Kenner and Melissa Robledo
  - Particle Fever (Abramorama/BOND 360) – David E. Kaplan, Mark Levinson, Andrea Miller, and Carla Solomon
  - Virunga (Netflix) – Joanna Natasegara and Orlando von Einsiedel

=== Television ===
Norman Felton Award for Outstanding Producer of Episodic Television, Drama
- Breaking Bad (AMC) – Melissa Bernstein, Sam Catlin, Bryan Cranston, Vince Gilligan, Peter Gould, Mark Johnson, Stewart Lyons, Michelle MacLaren, George Mastras, Diane Mercer, Thomas Schnauz, and Moira Walley-Beckett
  - Downton Abbey (PBS) – Julian Fellowes, Nigel Marchant, Gareth Neame, and Liz Trubridge
  - Game of Thrones (HBO) – David Benioff, Bernadette Caulfield, Frank Doelger, Chris Newman, Greg Spence, Carolyn Strauss, and D.B. Weiss
  - House of Cards (Netflix) – Dana Brunetti, Joshua Donen, David Fincher, David Manson, Iain Paterson, Eric Roth, Kevin Spacey, and Beau Willimon
  - True Detective (HBO) – Richard Brown, Carol Cuddy, Steve Golin, Woody Harrelson, Cary Joji Fukunaga, Matthew McConaughey, Nic Pizzolatto, and Scott Stephens
Danny Thomas Award for Outstanding Producer of Episodic Television, Comedy
- Orange Is the New Black (Netflix) – Mark A. Burley, Sara Hess, Jenji Kohan, Gary Lennon, Neri Tannenbaum, Michael Trim, and Lisa I. Vinnecour
  - The Big Bang Theory (CBS) – Faye Oshima Belyeu, Chuck Lorre, Steve Molaro, and Bill Prady
  - Louie (FX) – Pamela Adlon, Dave Becky, M. Blair Breard, Louis C.K., Vernon Chatman, Adam Escott, and Steven Wright
  - Modern Family (ABC) – Paul Corrigan, Megan Ganz, Abraham Higginbotham, Ben Karlin, Elaine Ko, Steven Levitan, Christopher Lloyd, Jeff Morton, Dan O'Shannon, Jeffrey Richman, Chris Smirnoff, Brad Walsh, Bill Wrubel, Sally Young, and Danny Zuker
  - Veep (HBO) – Chris Addison, Simon Blackwell, Christopher Godsick, Armando Iannucci, Stephanie Laing, Julia Louis-Dreyfus, Frank Rich, and Tony Roche
David L. Wolper Award for Outstanding Producer of Long-Form Television
- Fargo (FX) – Adam Bernstein, John Cameron, Ethan Coen, Joel Coen, Michael Frislev, Noah Hawley, Warren Littlefield, Chad Oakes, and Kim Todd
  - American Horror Story: Coven & Freak Show (FX) – Bradley Buecker, Dante Di Loreto, Brad Falchuk, Joseph Incaprera, Alexis Martin Woodall, Tim Minear, Ryan Murphy, Jennifer Salt, and James Wong
  - The Normal Heart (HBO) – Jason Blum, Dante Di Loreto, Scott Ferguson, Dede Gardner, Alexis Martin Woodall, Ryan Murphy, Brad Pitt, and Mark Ruffalo
  - The Roosevelts: An Intimate History (PBS) – Paul Barnes, Pam Tubridy Baucom, and Ken Burns
  - Sherlock (PBS) – Mark Gatiss, Steven Moffat, Beryl Vertue, and Sue Vertue
Outstanding Producer of Non-Fiction Television
- Cosmos: A Spacetime Odyssey (Fox/NatGeo) – Brannon Braga, Mitchell Cannold, Jason Clark, Ann Druyan, Livia Hanich, Steve Holtzman, and Seth MacFarlane
  - 30 for 30 (ESPN) – Andy Billman, John Dahl, Erin Leyden, Connor Schell, and Bill Simmons
  - American Masters (PBS) – Susan Lacy, Julie Sacks, and Junko Tsunashima
  - Anthony Bourdain: Parts Unknown (CNN) – Anthony Bourdain, Christopher Collins, Lydia Tenaglia, and Sandra Zweig
  - Shark Tank (ABC) – Becky Blitz, Mark Burnett, Bill Gaudsmith, Phil Gurin, Yun Lingner, Clay Newbill, Jim Roush, Laura Roush, and Max Swedlow
Outstanding Producer of Competition Television
- The Voice (NBC) – Stijn Bakkers, Mark Burnett, John De Mol, Chad Hines, Lee Metzger, Audrey Morrissey, Kyra Thompson, Mike Yurchuk, Amanda Zucker, and Jim Roush
  - The Amazing Race (CBS) – Jerry Bruckheimer, Elise Doganieri, Jonathan Littman, Bertram van Munster, and Mark Vertullo
  - Dancing with the Stars (ABC) – Ashley Edens Shaffer, Conrad Green, and Joe Sungkur
  - Project Runway (Lifetime) – Jane Cha Cutler, Desiree Gruber, Tim Gunn, Heidi Klum, Jonathan Murray, Sara Rea, and Teri Weideman
  - Top Chef (Bravo) – Daniel Cutforth, Casey Kriley, Jane Lipsitz, Hillary Olsen, Tara Sierner, Erica Ross, Doneen Arquines, and Shealan Spencer
Outstanding Producer of Live Entertainment & Talk Television
- The Tonight Show Starring Jimmy Fallon (NBC) – Rob Crabbe, Jamie Granet Bederman, Katie Hockmeyer, Jim Juvonen, Josh Lieb, Brian McDonald, Lorne Michaels, and Gavin Purcell
  - The Colbert Report (Comedy Central) – Meredith Bennett, Tanya Michnevich Bracco, Stephen Colbert, Richard Dahm, Paul Dinello, Barry Julien, Matt Lappin, Emily Lazar, Tom Purcell, and Jon Stewart
  - Jimmy Kimmel Live! (ABC) – David Craig, Ken Crosby, Doug DeLuca, Gary Greenberg, Erin Irwin, Jimmy Kimmel, Jill Leiderman, Molly McNearney, Tony Romero, Jason Schrift, Jennifer Sharron, Seth Weidner, and Josh Weintraub
  - Last Week Tonight with John Oliver (HBO) – John Oliver, Tim Carvell, and Liz Stanton
  - Real Time with Bill Maher (HBO) – Scott Carter, Sheila Griffiths, Marc Gurvitz, Dean Johnsen, Bill Maher, Billy Martin, and Matt Wood
Outstanding Sports Program
- Real Sports with Bryant Gumbel (HBO)
  - 24/7 (HBO)
  - Hard Knocks: "Training Camp with the Atlanta Falcons" (HBO)
  - Hard Knocks: "Training Camp with the Cincinnati Bengals" (HBO)
  - Inside: U.S. Soccer's March to Brazil (ESPN)
Outstanding Children's Program
- Sesame Street (PBS/Sprout)
  - Dora the Explorer (Nickelodeon)
  - Teenage Mutant Ninja Turtles (Nickelodeon)
  - Toy Story of Terror! (ABC)
  - Wynton Marsalis: A YoungArts Masterclass (HBO)

=== Digital ===
Outstanding Digital Series
- Comedians in Cars Getting Coffee (Crackle)
  - 30 for 30 Shorts (ESPN)
  - Cosmos: A National Geographic Deeper Dive (Fox/NatGeo)
  - Epic Rap Battles of History (Maker Studios)
  - Video Game High School season 3 (Rocket Jump Studios/Collective Digital Studio)

=== Milestone Award ===
- Jon Feltheimer

=== Stanley Kramer Award ===
- The Normal Heart

=== Visionary Award ===
- Plan B Entertainment

=== David O. Selznick Achievement Award in Theatrical Motion Pictures ===
- Gale Anne Hurd

=== Norman Lear Achievement Award in Television ===
- Mark Gordon
