= 29th Producers Guild of America Awards =

29th Annual Producers Guild Awards
- Date: January 20, 2018
- Location: The Beverly Hilton, Beverly Hills, California
- Country: United States
- Presented by: Producers Guild of America

Highlights
- Best Producer(s) Motion Picture: The Shape of Water – Guillermo del Toro and J. Miles Dale
- Best Producer(s) Animated Feature: Coco – Darla K. Anderson
- Best Producer(s) Documentary Motion Picture: Jane – Brett Morgen, Bryan Burk, Tony Gerber, and James Smith

The 29th Producers Guild of America Awards (also known as 2018 Producers Guild Awards), honoring the best film and television producers of 2017, were held at The Beverly Hilton in Beverly Hills, California on January 20, 2018.

The nominations for documentary film were announced on November 20, 2017. The nominations for film and television were announced on January 5, 2018.

== Winners and nominees ==
=== Film ===
Darryl F. Zanuck Award for Outstanding Producer of Theatrical Motion Pictures
- The Shape of Water – Guillermo del Toro and J. Miles Dale
  - The Big Sick – Judd Apatow and Barry Mendel
  - Call Me by Your Name – Peter Spears, Luca Guadagnino, Emilie Georges, and Marco Morabito
  - Dunkirk – Emma Thomas and Christopher Nolan
  - Get Out – Sean McKittrick, Edward H. Hamm Jr., Jason Blum, and Jordan Peele
  - I, Tonya – Bryan Unkeless, Steven Rogers, Margot Robbie, and Tom Ackerley
  - Lady Bird – Scott Rudin, Eli Bush, and Evelyn O'Neill
  - Molly's Game – Mark Gordon, Amy Pascal, and Matt Jackson
  - The Post – Amy Pascal, Steven Spielberg, and Kristie Macosko Krieger
  - Three Billboards Outside Ebbing, Missouri – Graham Broadbent, Peter Czernin, and Martin McDonagh
  - Wonder Woman – Charles Roven, Richard Suckle, Zack Snyder, and Deborah Snyder
Outstanding Producer of Animated Theatrical Motion Pictures
- Coco – Darla K. Anderson
  - The Boss Baby – Ramsey Ann Naito
  - Despicable Me 3 – Chris Meledandri and Janet Healy
  - Ferdinand – Lori Forte and Bruce Anderson
  - The Lego Batman Movie – Dan Lin, Phil Lord, and Christopher Miller
Outstanding Producer of Documentary Theatrical Motion Pictures
- Jane – Brett Morgen, Bryan Burk, Tony Gerber, and James Smith
  - Chasing Coral – Jeff Orlowski and Larissa Rhodes
  - City of Ghosts – Matthew Heineman
  - Cries from Syria – Evgeny Afineevsky, Den Tolmor, and Aaron I. Butler
  - Earth: One Amazing Day – Stephen McDonogh
  - Joshua: Teenager vs. Superpower – Matthew Torne, Mark Rinehart, and Joe Piscatella
  - The Newspaperman: The Life and Times of Ben Bradlee – Teddy Kunhardt and George Kunhardt

=== Television ===
Norman Felton Award for Outstanding Producer of Episodic Television, Drama
- The Handmaid's Tale (Hulu) – Bruce Miller, Warren Littlefield, Daniel Wilson, Fran Sears, Ilene Chaiken, Sheila Hockin, Eric Tuchman, Frank Siracusa, John Weber, Joseph Boccia, Elisabeth Moss, Kira Snyder, and Leila Gerstein
  - Big Little Lies (HBO) – David E. Kelley, Jean-Marc Vallée, Reese Witherspoon, Bruna Papandrea, Nicole Kidman, Per Saari, Gregg Fienberg, Nathan Ross, and Barbara A. Hall
  - The Crown (Netflix) – Peter Morgan, Stephen Daldry, Andy Harries, Philip Martin, Suzanne Mackie, Matthew Byam-Shaw, Robert Fox, Andy Stebbing, and Martin Harrison
  - Game of Thrones (HBO) – David Benioff, D. B. Weiss, Carolyn Strauss, Frank Doelger, Bernadette Caulfield, Bryan Cogman, Chris Newman, Lisa McAtackney, and Greg Spence
  - Stranger Things (Netflix) – Iain Paterson, Shawn Levy, Dan Cohen, The Duffer Brothers, Rand Geiger, and Justin Doble
Danny Thomas Award for Outstanding Producer of Episodic Television, Comedy
- The Marvelous Mrs. Maisel (Amazon) – Daniel Palladino, Amy Sherman-Palladino, Sheila Lawrence, and Dhana Rivera Gilbert
  - Curb Your Enthusiasm (HBO) – Larry David, Jeff Garlin, Jeff Schaffer, Justin Hurwitz, Jon Hayman, Laura Streicher, and Mychelle Deschamps
  - Master of None (Netflix) – Aziz Ansari, Alan Yang, Michael Schur, David Miner, Dave Becky, Igor Srubshchik, Andrew Blitz, and Eric Wareheim
  - Silicon Valley (HBO) – Mike Judge, Alec Berg, Jim Kleverweis, Jamie Babbit, Clay Tarver, Dan O'Keefe, Chris Provenzano, Graham Wagner, Carrie Kemper, Aaron Zelman, and Adam Countee
  - Veep (HBO) – David Mandel, Frank Rich, Julia Louis-Dreyfus, Lew Morton, Morgan Sackett, Peter Huyck, Alex Gregory, Georgia Pritchett, Jennifer Crittenden, Gabrielle Allan, Ian Maxtone-Graham, Steve Hely, Ted Cohen, David Hyman, Rachel Axler, Billy Kimball, Dale Stern, Erik Kenward, and Dan Mintz
David L. Wolper Award for Outstanding Producer of Long-Form Television
- Black Mirror (Netflix) – Annabel Jones and Charlie Brooker
  - Fargo (FX) – Noah Hawley, Warren Littlefield, Joel Coen, Ethan Coen, John Cameron, Steve Blackman, Bob DeLaurentis, Matt Wolpert, Ben Nedivi, Monica Beletsky, Kim Todd, Leslie Cowan, Regis Kimble, Chad Oakes, and Michael Frislev
  - Feud: Bette and Joan (FX) – Ryan Murphy, Dede Gardner, Tim Minear, Alexis Martin Woodall, Chip Vucelich, John J. Gray, Jaffe Cohen, Renee Tab, Michael Zam, Jessica Lange, and Susan Sarandon
  - Sherlock: The Lying Detective (PBS) – Steven Moffat, Mark Gatiss, Sue Vertue, Beryl Vertue, and Rebecca Eaton
  - The Wizard of Lies (HBO) – Jane Rosenthal, Robert De Niro, Berry Welsh, Barry Levinson, Tom Fontana, Jason Sosnoff, and Joseph E. Iberti
Outstanding Producer of Non-Fiction Television
- Leah Remini: Scientology and the Aftermath (A&E) – Leah Remini, Eli Holzman, Aaron Saidman, Myles Reiff, Adam Saltzberg, Erin Gamble, Lisa Rosen, Grainne Byrne, Taylor Levin, Alex Weresow, and Rachelle Mendez
  - 30 for 30 (ESPN) – Connor Schell, John Dahl, Libby Geist, Erin Leyden, Adam Neuhaus, Jenna Anthony, Gentry Kirby, Marquis Daisy, Andrew Billman, and Deirdre Fenton
  - 60 Minutes (CBS) – Jeff Fager
  - Anthony Bourdain: Parts Unknown (CNN) – Anthony Bourdain, Christopher Collins, Lydia Tenaglia, and Sandra Zweig
  - Spielberg (HBO) – Susan Lacy, Jessica Levin, and Emma Pildez
Outstanding Producer of Competition Television
- The Voice (NBC) – John de Mol, Jr., Mark Burnett, Audrey Morrissey, Lee Metzger, Chad Hines, Amanda Zucker, Kyra Thompson, Jay Bienstock, Stijn Bakkers, Mike Yurchuk, Teddy Valenti, and Carson Daly
  - The Amazing Race (ABC) – Jerry Bruckheimer, Bertram van Munster, Jonathan Littman, Elise Doganieri, and Mark Vertullo
  - American Ninja Warrior (NBC) – Arthur Smith, Kent Weed, Anthony Storm, Brian Richardson, Kristen Stabile, David Markus, Royce Toni, Stephen Saylor, J.D. Pruess, Jeffrey J. Hyman, D. Max Poris, Briana Vowels, and Jonathan Provost
  - Lip Sync Battle (Spike) – Casey Patterson, Jay Peterson, John Krasinski, Stephen Merchant, James McKinlay, Leah Culton Gonzalez, Pete DiObilda, LL Cool J, Genna Gintzig, Lindsay John, Jacob Burke, and Diane Perrotta
  - Top Chef (Bravo) – Dan Cutforth, Jane Lipsitz, Casey Kriley, Tom Colicchio, Padma Lakshmi, Doneen Arquines, Gaylen Gawlowski, Erica Ross, Blake Davis, Scott Patch, Patrick Schmedeman, Ellie Carbaial Araiza, Daniel Calin, and Zoe Jackson
Outstanding Producer of Live Entertainment & Talk Television
- Last Week Tonight with John Oliver (HBO) – John Oliver, Tim Carvell, and Liz Stanton
  - Full Frontal with Samantha Bee (TBS) – Samantha Bee, Jo Miller, Jason Jones, Tony Hernandez, Miles Kahn, Alison Camillo, Pat King, and Allana Harkin
  - Jimmy Kimmel Live! (ABC) – Jimmy Kimmel, Jill Leiderman, Jason Schrift, Doug DeLuca, Erin Irwin, David Craig, Gary Greenberg, Jennifer Sharron, Tony Romero, Ken Crosby, Josh Weintraub, Seth Weidner, and Molly McNearney
  - The Late Show with Stephen Colbert (CBS) – Stephen Colbert, Chris Licht, Tom Purcell, Jon Stewart, Barry Julien, Tanya Michnevich Bracco, Aaron Cohen, Paul Dinello, Emily Gertler, Matt Lappin, Opus Moreschi, Michael Brumm, Paige Kendig and Jake Plunkett
  - Saturday Night Live (NBC) – Lorne Michaels, Steve Higgins, Erik Kenward, Lindsay Shookus, Erin Doyle, Tom Broecker, and Ken Aymong
Outstanding Sports Program
- Real Sports with Bryant Gumbel (HBO)
  - All or Nothing: A Season with the Los Angeles Rams (Amazon)
  - Hard Knocks: Training Camp with the Tampa Bay Buccaneers (HBO)
  - SportsCenter with Scott Van Pelt (ESPN)
  - VICE World of Sports (VICELAND)
Outstanding Children's Program
- Sesame Street (PBS/HBO)
  - Doc McStuffins (Disney Junior)
  - Nickelodeon Kids' Choice Awards 2017 (Nickelodeon)
  - School of Rock (Nickelodeon)
  - SpongeBob SquarePants (Nickelodeon)
Outstanding Short-Form Program
- Carpool Karaoke (CBS)
  - Better Call Saul's Los Pollos Hermanos Employee Training (AMC)
  - Humans of New York: The Series (Facebook Watch)
  - National Endowment for the Arts: United States of Arts (Season 3)
  - Viceland at the Women's March (VICELAND)

=== Milestone Award ===
- Donna Langley

=== Stanley Kramer Award ===
- Get Out

=== Visionary Award ===
- Ava DuVernay

=== David O. Selznick Achievement Award in Theatrical Motion Pictures ===
- Charles Roven

=== Norman Lear Achievement Award in Television ===
- Ryan Murphy
