= 28th Producers Guild of America Awards =

28th Annual Producers Guild Awards
- Date: January 28, 2017
- Location: The Beverly Hilton, Beverly Hills, California
- Country: United States
- Presented by: Producers Guild of America

Highlights
- Best Producer(s) Motion Picture: La La Land – Fred Berger, Jordan Horowitz, and Mark Platt
- Best Producer(s) Animated Feature: Zootopia – Clark Spencer
- Best Producer(s) Documentary Motion Picture: O.J.: Made in America – Ezra Edelman and Caroline Waterlow

The 28th Producers Guild of America Awards (also known as 2017 Producers Guild Awards), honoring the best film and television producers of 2016, were held at The Beverly Hilton in Beverly Hills, California on January 28, 2017. The nominations for documentary film were announced on November 22, 2016, the nominations for television were announced on January 5, 2017, and the nominations for film were announced on January 10, 2017.

== Winners and nominees ==
=== Film ===
Darryl F. Zanuck Award for Outstanding Producer of Theatrical Motion Pictures
- La La Land – Fred Berger, Jordan Horowitz, and Marc Platt
  - Arrival – Dan Levine, Shawn Levy, Aaron Ryder, and David Linde
  - Deadpool – Simon Kinberg, Ryan Reynolds, and Lauren Shuler Donner
  - Fences – Scott Rudin, Denzel Washington, and Todd Black
  - Hacksaw Ridge – Bill Mechanic and David Permut
  - Hell or High Water – Carla Hacken and Julie Yorn
  - Hidden Figures – Donna Gigliotti, Peter Chernin, Jenno Topping, Pharrell Williams, and Theodore Melfi
  - Lion – Emile Sherman, Iain Canning, and Angie Fielder
  - Manchester by the Sea – Matt Damon, Kimberly Steward, Chris Moore, Lauren Beck, and Kevin J. Walsh
  - Moonlight – Adele Romanski, Dede Gardner, and Jeremy Kleiner
Outstanding Producer of Animated Theatrical Motion Pictures
- Zootopia – Clark Spencer
  - Finding Dory – Lindsey Collins
  - Kubo and the Two Strings – Arianne Sutner and Travis Knight
  - Moana – Osnat Shurer
  - The Secret Life of Pets – Chris Meledandri and Janet Healy
Outstanding Producer of Documentary Theatrical Motion Pictures
- O.J.: Made in America – Ezra Edelman and Caroline Waterlow
  - Dancer – Gabrielle Tana
  - The Eagle Huntress – Stacey Reiss and Otto Bell
  - Life, Animated – Julie Goldman and Roger Ross Williams
  - Tower – Keith Maitland, Susan Thomson, and Megan Gilbride

=== Television ===
Norman Felton Award for Outstanding Producer of Episodic Television, Drama
- Stranger Things (Netflix) – Matt Duffer, Ross Duffer, Shawn Levy, Dan Cohen, Iain Paterson
  - Better Call Saul (AMC) – Vince Gilligan, Peter Gould, Melissa Bernstein, Mark Johnson, Thomas Schnauz, Gennifer Hutchison, Nina Jack, Robin Sweet, Diane Mercer, Bob Odenkirk
  - Game of Thrones (HBO) – David Benioff, D. B. Weiss, Bernadette Caulfield, Frank Doelger, Carolyn Strauss, Bryan Cogman, Lisa McAtackney, Chris Newman, Greg Spence
  - House of Cards (Netflix) – Beau Willimon, Dana Brunetti, Michael Dobbs, Josh Donen, David Fincher, Eric Roth, Kevin Spacey, Robin Wright, John Mankiewicz, Robert Zotnowski, Jay Carson, Frank Pugliese, Boris Malden, Hameed Shaukat
  - Westworld (HBO) – J. J. Abrams, Jonathan Nolan, Lisa Joy, Bryan Burk, Athena Wickham, Kathy Lingg, Richard J. Lewis, Roberto Patino, Katherine Lingenfelter, Cherylanne Martin
Danny Thomas Award for Outstanding Producer of Episodic Television, Comedy
- Atlanta (FX) – Donald Glover, Dianne McGunigle, Paul Simms, Hiro Murai, Alex Orr
  - Black-ish (ABC) – Kenya Barris, Jonathan Groff, Anthony Anderson, Laurence Fishburne, Helen Sugland, E. Brian Dobbins, Vijal Patel, Gail Lerner, Corey Nickerson, Courtney Lilly, Lindsey Shockley, Peter Saji, Jenifer Rice-Genzuk Henry, Hale Rothstein, Michael Petok, Yvette Lee Bowser
  - Silicon Valley (HBO) – Mike Judge, Alec Berg, Jim Kleverweis, Clay Tarver, Dan O'Keefe, Michael Rotenberg, Tom Lassally, John Levenstein, Ron Weiner, Carrie Kemper, Adam Countee
  - Veep (HBO) – David Mandel, Frank Rich, Julia Louis-Dreyfus, Lew Morton, Morgan Sackett, Sean Gray, Peter Huyck, Alex Gregory, Jim Margolis, Georgia Pritchett, Will Smith, Chris Addison, Rachel Axler, David Hyman, Erik Kenward, Billy Kimball, Steve Koren
David L. Wolper Award for Outstanding Producer of Long-Form Television
- The People v. O. J. Simpson: American Crime Story (FX) – Scott Alexander and Larry Karaszewski, Ryan Murphy, Brad Falchuk, Nina Jacobson, Brad Simpson, D.V. DeVincentis, Anthony Hemingway, Alexis Martin Woodall, John Travolta, Chip Vucelich
  - Black Mirror (Netflix) – Annabel Jones, Charlie Brooker
  - The Night Manager (AMC) – Simon Cornwell, Stephen Garrett, Stephen Cornwell, Hugh Laurie, Tom Hiddleston, Susanne Bier, David Farr, John le Carré, William D. Johnson, Alexei Boltho, Rob Bullock
  - The Night Of (HBO) – Steven Zaillian, Richard Price, Jane Tranter, Garrett Basch, Scott Ferguson
  - Sherlock: The Abominable Bride (PBS) – Mark Gatiss, Steven Moffat, Sue Vertue, Beryl Vertue
Outstanding Producer of Non-Fiction Television
- Making a Murderer (Netflix) – Laura Ricciardi, Moira Demos
  - 30 for 30 (ESPN) – Connor Schell, John Dahl, Libby Geist, Bill Simmons, Erin Leyden, Andrew Billman, Marquis Daisy, Deirdre Fenton
  - 60 Minutes (CBS) – Jeff Fager
  - Anthony Bourdain: Parts Unknown (CNN) – Anthony Bourdain, Christopher Collins, Lydia Tenaglia, Sandra Zweig
  - Hamilton's America (PBS) – Alex Horwitz, Nicole Pusateri, Lin-Manuel Miranda, Jeffrey Seller, Dave Sirulnick, Jon Kamen, Justin Wilkes
Outstanding Producer of Competition Television
- The Voice (NBC) – Audrey Morrissey, Jay Bienstock, Mark Burnett, John de Mol, Jr., Chad Hines, Lee Metzger, Kyra Thompson, Mike Yurchuk, Amanda Zucker, Carson Daly
  - The Amazing Race (CBS) – Jerry Bruckheimer, Bertram van Munster, Jonathan Littman, Elise Doganieri, Mark Vertullo
  - American Ninja Warrior (NBC) – Arthur Smith, Kent Weed, Anthony Storm, Brian Richardson, Kristen Stabile, David Markus, J.D. Pruess, D. Max Poris, Zayna Abi-Hashim, Royce Toni, John Gunn, Matt Silverberg, Briana Vowels, Mason Funk, Jonathan Provost
  - Lip Sync Battle (Spike) – Casey Patterson, Jay Peterson, John Krasinski, Stephen Merchant, Leah Gonzalez, Genna Gintzig, LL Cool J
  - Top Chef (Bravo) – Daniel Cutforth, Tom Colicchio, Casey Kriley, Padma Lakshmi, Jane Lipsitz, Doneen Arquines, Erica Ross, Patrick Schmedeman, Ellie Carbaial, Tara Seiner, Wade Sheeler
Outstanding Producer of Live Entertainment & Talk Television
- Last Week Tonight with John Oliver (HBO) – Tim Carvell, John Oliver, Liz Stanton
  - Full Frontal with Samantha Bee (TBS) – Samantha Bee, Jo Miller, Jason Jones, Tony Hernandez, Miles Kahn, Pat King, Alison Camillo, Kristen Everman
  - The Late Late Show with James Corden (CBS) – Ben Winston, Rob Crabbe, Mike Gibbons, Amy Ozols, Sheila Rogers, Michael Kaplan, Jeff Kopp, James Longman, Josie Cliff, James Corden
  - Real Time with Bill Maher (HBO) – Bill Maher, Scott Carter, Sheila Griffiths, Marc Gurvitz, Billy Martin, Dean E. Johnsen, Chris Kelly, Matt Wood
  - Saturday Night Live (NBC) – Lorne Michaels, Steve Higgins, Erik Kenward, Lindsay Shookus, Erin Doyle, Ken Aymong
Outstanding Sports Program
- Real Sports with Bryant Gumbel (HBO) (TIE)
- VICE World of Sports (VICELAND) (TIE)
  - E:60 (ESPN)
  - The Fight Game with Jim Lampley: A Tribute to Muhammad Ali (HBO)
  - Hard Knocks: Training Camp with the Los Angeles Rams (HBO)
Outstanding Children's Program
- Sesame Street (PBS/HBO)
  - Girl Meets World (Disney Channel)
  - Octonauts (Disney Channel)
  - School of Rock (Nickelodeon)
  - SpongeBob SquarePants (Nickelodeon)

=== Digital ===
Outstanding Digital Series
- Comedians in Cars Getting Coffee
  - 30 for 30 Shorts
  - Epic Rap Battles of History
  - Marvel's Agents of S.H.I.E.L.D.: Academy
  - National Endowment for the Arts: United States of Arts

=== Milestone Award ===
- Tom Rothman

=== Stanley Kramer Award ===
- Loving

=== Visionary Award ===
- Megan Ellison

=== David O. Selznick Achievement Award in Theatrical Motion Pictures ===
- Irwin Winkler

=== Norman Lear Achievement Award in Television ===
- James L. Brooks
