= David O. Selznick Achievement Award in Theatrical Motion Pictures =

Annual film award given by the Producers Guild of America

The David O. Selznick Achievement Award in Theatrical Motion Pictures is awarded annually by the Producers Guild of America (PGA) at the Producers Guild of America Awards ceremonies recognizing the individual's outstanding body of work in motion pictures. The award category was instituted in 1989 and first awarded at the 1st Producers Guild Awards.

== History ==
The award is named after American film producer David O. Selznick (1902–1965). As of the 34th Producers Guild of America Awards, there have been 40 awards presented.

== Award winners ==
Year	Image	Recipient(s)	Notes	Nationality	Ref.
1989 (1st)		Hal Roach	Roach is the first recipient of this award. He founded Hal Roach Studios in 1914 and produced the films of silent film comedians Laurel and Hardy and Harold Lloyd.	USA	
1990 (2nd)		Stanley Kramer	A prolific filmmaker who directed "message pictures" such as The Defiant Ones (1958), Guess Who's Coming to Dinner (1967), and Judgment at Nuremberg (1961).	USA	
1991 (3rd)		Pandro S. Berman	He received six nominations for the Academy Award for Best Picture for The Gay Divorcee (1934), Alice Adams and Top Hat (both 1935), Stage Door (1937), Father of the Bride (1950), and Ivanhoe (1952).	USA	
1992 (4th)		Richard D. Zanuck	Together, Zanuck and Brown headed their own production company, producing films like The Sting (1973), Jaws (1975), and Driving Miss Daisy (1989).	USA	
1992 (4th)		David Brown	Together, Zanuck and Brown headed their own production company, producing films like The Sting (1973), Jaws (1975), and Driving Miss Daisy (1989).	USA	
1993 (5th)		Saul Zaentz	A producer who won the Academy Award for Best Picture for One Flew Over the Cuckoo's Nest (1975), Amadeus (1984), and The English Patient (1996).	USA	
1994 (6th)		Howard W. Koch	Kock was appointed the head of film production at Paramount Pictures in 1964 from 1966 when he left to set up his own production company.	USA	
1995 (7th)		Walter Mirisch	He was the president and executive head of the independent film production company The Mirisch Corporation, which he formed in 1957. He won the Academy Award for Best Picture for In the Heat of the Night (1967).	USA	
1996 (8th)		Billy Wilder	An prolific filmmaker who directed such films as Double Indemnity (1944), The Lost Weekend (1945), Sunset Boulevard (1950), Ace in the Hole (1951), Some Like It Hot (1959), and The Apartment (1960).	USA	
1997 (9th)		Clint Eastwood	Eastwood has produced and directed numerous films, including Unforgiven (1992), The Bridges of Madison County (1995), Mystic River (2003), and Million Dollar Baby (2004).	USA	
1998 (10th)		Steven Bochco	Bochco developed a number of television series, including Hill Street Blues, L.A. Law, Doogie Howser, M.D., Cop Rock, and NYPD Blue.	USA	
1999 (11th)		Jerry Bruckheimer	Bruckheimer has produced films like Flashdance (1983), The Rock (1995), Crimson Tide (1995), Con Air (1997), Armageddon (1998), Enemy of the State (1998), Pearl Harbor (2001), Black Hawk Down (2001), as well as the Beverly Hills Cop, Top Gun, Bad Boys, Pirates of the Caribbean, and National Treasure franchises.	USA	
2000 (12th)		Brian Grazer	Grazer is the producing partner of Ron Howard, with whom he created Imagine Entertainment in 1986. He produced numerous projects, including the films Splash (1984), Apollo 13 (1995), A Beautiful Mind (2001), and Frost/Nixon (2008).	USA	
2001 (13th)		Lawrence Gordon	He specializes in producing action-oriented films and other genres. Some of his most popular productions include 48 Hours (1982), Predator (1987), Die Hard (1988), Die Hard 2 (1990), Predator 2 (1990), Point Break (1991), Boogie Nights (1997), Lara Croft: Tomb Raider (2001), and Prey (2022).	USA	
2002 (14th)		Robert Evans	Evans was a studio executive and producer best known for his work on Rosemary's Baby (1968), Love Story (1970), The Godfather (1972), and Chinatown (1974).	USA	
2003 (15th)		Dino De Laurentiis	He was an Italian film producer and businessman who produced numerous films.	Italy	
2004 (16th)		Laura Ziskin	She was the executive producer of Pretty Woman (1990) and producer of Spider-Man (2002), Spider-Man 2 (2004), Spider-Man 3 (2007).	USA	
2005 (17th)		Roger Corman	A trailblazer in the world of independent film producing numerous B films of the 1950s and 1960s.	USA	
2006 (18th)		Douglas Wick and Lucy Fisher		USA	
2007 (19th)		Frank Marshall	Together, Marshall and Kennedy founded the production company Amblin Entertainment, along with Steven Spielberg. In 1991, they founded The Kennedy/Marshall Company, a film production company.	USA	
2007 (19th)		Kathleen Kennedy	Together, Marshall and Kennedy founded the production company Amblin Entertainment, along with Steven Spielberg. In 1991, they founded The Kennedy/Marshall Company, a film production company.	USA	
2008 (20th)		Michael Douglas	An American film actor who has produced numerous films, including One Flew Over the Cuckoo's Nest (1975), The China Syndrome (1979), Romancing the Stone (1984), The Jewel of the Nile (1985), and The Rainmaker (1997).	USA	
2009 (21st)		John Lasseter	Lasseter acted as the chief creative officer of Pixar Animation Studios, Walt Disney Animation Studios, and Disneytoon Studios, as well as the Principal Creative Advisor for Walt Disney Imagineering.	USA	
2010 (22nd)		Scott Rudin	Rudin is a producer of numerous projects ranging from film, television and theatre becoming one of the 19 people to win the Emmy Award, Grammy Award, Oscar, and Tony Award.	USA	
2011 (23rd)		Steven Spielberg	A major figure of the New Hollywood era and pioneer of the modern blockbuster, he is the most commercially successful director in history. Spielberg co-founded Amblin Entertainment in 1980 and DreamWorks in 1994, and he has served as a producer for many successful films and television series.	USA	
2012 (24th)		Eric Fellner and Tim Bevan	Together, Fellner and Bevan founded the production company Working Title Films in 1983, which has produced numerous British and American films.	UK; New Zealand	
2013 (25th)		Michael G. Wilson and Barbara Broccoli	Broccoli and Wilson are best known for producing numerous films within the James Bond franchise.	USA; UK	
2014 (26th)		Gale Anne Hurd	Hurd is the founder of Valhalla Entertainment (formerly Pacific Western Productions), and a former recording secretary for the Producers Guild of America.	USA	
2015 (27th)		David Heyman	Heyman is best known for producing the Harry Potter, the Fantastic Beasts, and the Paddington franchise films. He also has produced films for Noah Baumbach, Greta Gerwig, and Quentin Tarantino.	UK	
2016 (28th)		Irwin Winkler	Winkler produced numerous films starting with the Elvis Presley musical Double Trouble (1967) followed by, the critically acclaimed films They Shoot Horses, Don't They? (1969), Rocky (1976), Raging Bull (1980), The Right Stuff (1983), and Goodfellas (1990).	USA	
2017 (29th)		Charles Roven	Roven is the president and co-founder of Atlas Entertainment and produced the superhero films The Dark Knight Trilogy (2008), Man of Steel (2012), Batman v Superman: Dawn of Justice (2016), and Suicide Squad (2016).	USA	
2018 (30th)		Kevin Feige	He has been the president of Marvel Studios and the primary producer of the Marvel Cinematic Universe franchise since 2007.	USA	
2019 (31st)		Brad Pitt	In 2001, they co-founded the production company Plan B Entertainment. They produced The Departed (2006), 12 Years a Slave (2013), and Moonlight (2016), all of which won the Academy Award for Best Picture, and were also nominated for The Tree of Life (2011), Moneyball (2011), Selma (2014), and The Big Short (2015).	USA	
2019 (31st)		Dede Gardner	In 2001, they co-founded the production company Plan B Entertainment. They produced The Departed (2006), 12 Years a Slave (2013), and Moonlight (2016), all of which won the Academy Award for Best Picture, and were also nominated for The Tree of Life (2011), Moneyball (2011), Selma (2014), and The Big Short (2015).	USA	
2019 (31st)		Jeremy Kleiner	In 2001, they co-founded the production company Plan B Entertainment. They produced The Departed (2006), 12 Years a Slave (2013), and Moonlight (2016), all of which won the Academy Award for Best Picture, and were also nominated for The Tree of Life (2011), Moneyball (2011), Selma (2014), and The Big Short (2015).	USA	
2020 (32nd)	not awarded				
2021 (33rd)		Mary Parent	She is a former President of Production for Universal Pictures and she co-founded Disruption Entertainment in 2011, a company with a first-look deal at Paramount Pictures, and co-produces films with Legendary Entertainment. She was formerly the Chairperson of Metro Goldwyn Mayer's Worldwide Motion Picture Group.	USA	
2022 (34th)		Tom Cruise	Cruise formed Cruise/Wagner Productions in 1993, and the company has since co-produced several of Cruise's films, the first being Mission: Impossible in 1996 which was also Cruise's first project as a producer. Cruise has produced many films in which he appeared, including Mission: Impossible, Without Limits, Mission: Impossible 2, The Others and Vanilla Sky.	USA	
2023 (35th)		Martin Scorsese	Scorsese is a filmmaker known for directing such films as Mean Streets (1973), Taxi Driver (1976), Raging Bull (1980), Goodfellas (1990), The Departed (2006), The Wolf of Wall Street (2013), The Irishman (2019), and Killers of the Flower Moon (2023).	USA	
2024 (36th)		Chris Meledandri	Meledandri is the founder and CEO of the animation studio Illumination and the second animation producer to receive the award.	USA	
2025 (37th)		Amy Pascal		USA	
