= 27th Producers Guild of America Awards =

27th Annual Producers Guild Awards
- Date: January 23, 2016
- Location: Hyatt Regency Century Plaza, Los Angeles, California
- Country: United States
- Presented by: Producers Guild of America

Highlights
- Best Producer(s) Motion Picture: The Big Short – Brad Pitt, Dede Gardner, and Jeremy Kleiner
- Best Producer(s) Animated Feature: Inside Out – Jonas Rivera
- Best Producer(s) Documentary Motion Picture: Amy – James Gay-Rees

The 27th Producers Guild of America Awards (also known as 2016 Producers Guild Awards), honoring the best film and television producers of 2015, were held at the Hyatt Regency Century Plaza in Los Angeles, California on January 23, 2016. The nominations for documentary film were announced on November 23, 2015, and the nominations for television were announced on December 8, 2015. The final film and television nominations were announced on January 5, 2016.

== Winners and nominees ==
=== Film ===
Darryl F. Zanuck Award for Outstanding Producer of Theatrical Motion Pictures
- The Big Short – Brad Pitt, Dede Gardner, and Jeremy Kleiner
  - Bridge of Spies – Steven Spielberg, Marc Platt, and Kristie Macosko Krieger
  - Brooklyn – Finola Dwyer and Amanda Posey
  - Ex Machina – Andrew Macdonald and Allon Reich
  - Mad Max: Fury Road – Doug Mitchell and George Miller
  - The Martian – Simon Kinberg, Ridley Scott, Michael Schaefer, and Mark Huffam
  - The Revenant – Arnon Milchan, Steve Golin, Alejandro G. Iñárritu, Mary Parent, and Keith Redmon
  - Sicario – Basil Iwanyk, Edward L. McDonnell, and Molly Smith
  - Spotlight – Michael Sugar, Steve Golin, Nicole Rocklin, and Blye Pagon Faust
  - Straight Outta Compton – Ice Cube, Matt Alvarez, F. Gary Gray, Dr. Dre, and Scott Bernstein
Outstanding Producer of Animated Theatrical Motion Pictures
- Inside Out – Jonas Rivera
  - Anomalisa – Rosa Tran, Duke Johnson, and Charlie Kaufman
  - The Good Dinosaur – Denise Ream
  - Minions – Chris Meledandri and Janet Healy
  - The Peanuts Movie – Craig Schulz and Michael J. Travers
Outstanding Producer of Documentary Theatrical Motion Pictures
- Amy – James Gay-Rees
  - The Hunting Ground – Amy Ziering
  - The Look of Silence – Signe Byrge Sørensen
  - Meru – Jimmy Chin and Elizabeth Chai Vasarhelyi
  - Something Better to Come – Sigrid Dyekjær and Hanna Polak

=== Television ===
Norman Felton Award for Outstanding Producer of Episodic Television, Drama
- Game of Thrones (HBO) – David Benioff, D. B. Weiss, Bernadette Caulfield, Frank Doelger, Carolyn Strauss, Bryan Cogman, Lisa McAtackney, Chris Newman, Greg Spence
  - Better Call Saul (AMC) – Vince Gilligan, Peter Gould, Melissa Bernstein, Mark Johnson, Stewart A. Lyons, Thomas Schnauz, Gennifer Hutchison, Nina Jack, Diane Mercer, Bob Odenkirk
  - Homeland (Showtime) – Alex Gansa, Alexander Cary, Lesli Linka Glatter, Howard Gordon, Chip Johannessen, Meredith Stiehm, Patrick Harbinson, Michael Klick, Claire Danes, Lauren White
  - House of Cards (Netflix) – Beau Willimon, Dana Brunetti, John David Coles, Joshua Donen, David Fincher, Eric Roth, Kevin Spacey, Robert Zotnowski, Karen Moore
  - Mad Men (AMC) – Matthew Weiner, Scott Hornbacher, Janet Leahy, Semi Chellas, Erin Levy, Jon Hamm, Blake McCormick, Tom Smuts
Danny Thomas Award for Outstanding Producer of Episodic Television, Comedy
- Transparent (Amazon) – Joey Soloway, Andrea Sperling, Victor Hsu, Nisha Ganatra, Rick Rosenthal, Bridget Bedard
  - Inside Amy Schumer (Comedy Central) – Amy Schumer, Daniel Powell, Jessi Klein, Steven Ast, Tony Hernandez, Kim Caramele, Ryan Cunningham, Kevin Kane, Ayesha Rokadia
  - Modern Family (ABC) – Steven Levitan, Christopher Lloyd, Paul Corrigan, Abraham Higginbotham, Jeff Morton, Jeffrey Richman, Brad Walsh, Danny Zuker, Vali Chandrasekaran, Megan Ganz, Elaine Ko, Kenny Schwartz, Chuck Tatham, Rick Wiener, Chris Smirnoff, Sally Young
  - Silicon Valley (HBO) – Mike Judge, Alec Berg, Jim Kleverweis, Clay Tarver, Dan O’Keefe, Michael Rotenberg, Tom Lassally
  - Veep (HBO) – Armando Iannucci, Chris Addison, Simon Blackwell, Christopher Godsick, Stephanie Laing, Julia Louis-Dreyfus, Frank Rich, Tony Roche, Kevin Cecil, Roger Drew, Sean Gray, Ian Martin, Georgia Pritchett, David Quantick, Andy Riley, Will Smith, Bill Hill
David L. Wolper Award for Outstanding Producer of Long-Form Television
- Fargo (FX) – Noah Hawley, John Cameron, Ethan Coen, Joel Coen, Warren Littlefield, Kim Todd
  - American Crime (ABC) – John Ridley, Michael McDonald, Julie Hébert, Stacy Littlejohn, Diana Son, Keith Huff, Lori-Etta Taub
  - American Horror Story: Hotel (FX) – Brad Falchuk, Ryan Murphy, Bradley Buecker, Tim Minear, Jennifer Salt, James Wong, Alexis Martin Woodall, Robert M. Williams Jr.
  - True Detective (HBO) – Nic Pizzolatto, Scott Stephens, Steve Golin, Aida Rodgers
  - A Very Murray Christmas (Netflix) – Sofia Coppola, Roman Coppola, Mitch Glazer, Tony Hernandez, Bill Murray, Michael Zakin
Outstanding Producer of Non-Fiction Television
- The Jinx: The Life and Deaths of Robert Durst (HBO) – Marc Smerling, Andrew Jarecki, Jason Blum
  - 30 for 30 (ESPN) – Connor Schell, John Dahl, Bill Simmons, Erin Leyden, Andrew Billman, Marquis Daisy, Libby Geist
  - Anthony Bourdain: Parts Unknown (CNN) – Anthony Bourdain, Christopher Collins, Lydia Tenaglia, Sandra Zweig
  - Shark Tank (ABC) – Mark Burnett, Clay Newbill, Yun Lingner, Max Swedlow, Jim Roush, Brandon Wallace, Becky Blitz, Laura Roush, Shaun Polakow, Phil Gurin
  - Vice (ABC) – BJ Levin, Bill Maher, Eddy Moretti, Shane Smith, Jonah Kaplan, Tim Clancy, Ben Anderson, Shawn Killebrew
Outstanding Producer of Competition Television
- The Voice (NBC) – Audrey Morrissey, Mark Burnett, John de Mol, Marc Jansen, Lee Metzger, Chad Hines, Jim Roush, Kyra Thompson, Mike Yurchuk, Amanda Zucker
  - The Amazing Race (CBS) – Jerry Bruckheimer, Bertram van Munster, Jonathan Littman, Elise Doganieri, Mark Vertullo
  - Dancing with the Stars (ABC) – Rob Wade, Ashley Edens-Shaffer, Joe Sungkur
  - Project Runway (Lifetime) – Jonathan Murray, Sara Rea, Desiree Gruber, Jane Cha, Heidi Klum, Tim Gunn, Teri Weideman
  - Top Chef (Bravo) – Daniel Cutforth, Tom Colicchio, Chaz Gray, Casey Kriley, Padma Lakshmi, Jane Lipsitz, Doneen Arquines, Erica Ross
Outstanding Producer of Live Entertainment & Talk Television
- Last Week Tonight with John Oliver (HBO) – Tim Carvell, John Oliver, Liz Stanton
  - The Colbert Report (Comedy Central) – Stephen T. Colbert, Tom Purcell, Jon Stewart, Meredith Bennett, Barry Julien, Emily Lazar, Tanya Michnevich Bracco, Paul Dinello, Matt Lappin
  - Key & Peele (Comedy Central) – Jay Martel, Ian Roberts, Keegan-Michael Key, Jordan Peele, Joel Zadak, Peter Principato, Peter Atencio, Linda Morel
  - Real Time with Bill Maher (HBO) – Bill Maher, Scott Carter, Sheila Griffiths, Marc Gurvitz, Billy Martin, Dean E. Johnsen, Matt Wood
  - The Tonight Show Starring Jimmy Fallon (NBC) – Lorne Michaels, Jamie Granet Bederman, Katie Hockmeyer, Jim Juvonen, Brian McDonald, Josh Lieb, Gavin Purcell
Outstanding Sports Program
- Real Sports with Bryant Gumbel
  - Back on Board: Greg Louganis
  - E:60
  - Hard Knocks: Training Camp With the Houston Texans
  - Kareem: Minority of One
Outstanding Children's Program
- Sesame Street (PBS)
  - Doc McStuffins (Disney Junior)
  - The Fairly OddParents (Nickelodeon)
  - The Octonauts (Disney Junior)
  - Teenage Mutant Ninja Turtles (Nickelodeon)
  - Toy Story That Time Forgot (ABC)

=== Digital ===
Outstanding Digital Series
- Comedians in Cars Getting Coffee
  - 30 for 30 Shorts
  - Epic Rap Battles of History
  - Agents of S.H.I.E.L.D.: Double Agent
  - This American Life Presents: Videos 4 U

=== Milestone Award ===
- Tom Rothman

=== Stanley Kramer Award ===
- The Hunting Ground

=== Visionary Award ===
- Industrial Light & Magic

=== David O. Selznick Achievement Award in Theatrical Motion Pictures ===
- David Heyman

=== Norman Lear Achievement Award in Television ===
- Shonda Rhimes
