= Milestone Award =

Milestone Award could mean:

- Billboard Milestone Award
- International Ice Hockey Federation Milestone Award
- Producers Guild of America Milestone Award
