= 10th Golden Laurel Awards =

10th Annual Golden Laurel Awards
- Date: March 3, 1999
- Location: The Century Plaza Hotel, Los Angeles, California
- Country: United States
- Presented by: Producers Guild of America

Highlights
- Best Producer(s) Motion Picture: Saving Private Ryan – Steven Spielberg, Allison Lyon Segan, Bonnie Curtis, Ian Bryce, Mark Gordon, and Gary Levinsohn

The 10th PGA Golden Laurel Awards, honoring the best film and television producers of 1998, were held at The Century Plaza Hotel in Los Angeles, California on March 3, 1999. The nominees were announced on January 19, 1999.

== Winners and nominees ==
=== Film ===
Outstanding Producer of Theatrical Motion Pictures
- Saving Private Ryan – Steven Spielberg, Allison Lyon Segan, Bonnie Curtis, Ian Bryce, Mark Gordon, and Gary Levinsohn
  - Gods and Monsters – Paul Colichman, Gregg Fienberg, and Mark R. Harris
  - Life Is Beautiful (La vita è bella) – Elda Ferri and Gianluigi Braschi
  - Shakespeare in Love – David Parfitt, Donna Gigliotti, Harvey Weinstein, Edward Zwick, and Marc Norman
  - Waking Ned – Glynis Murray and Richard Holmes

=== Television ===
Outstanding Producer of Episodic Television
- The Practice – David E. Kelley, Robert Breech, Jeffrey Kramer, Christina Musrey, Gary M. Strangis, and Pamela J. Wisne
Outstanding Producer of Long-Form Television
- From the Earth to the Moon – Tom Hanks, Tony To, John P. Melfi, Graham Yost, Brian Grazer, Ron Howard, Michael Bostick, Erik Bork, Bruce Richmond, and Janace Tashjian

=== Special ===
Lifetime Achievement Award in Motion Picture
- Ray Stark
Lifetime Achievement Award in Television
- Steven Bochco
Most Promising Producer in Theatrical Motion Pictures
- Pleasantville – Gary Ross
Most Promising Producer in Television
- The X Files – Chris Carter
Visionary Award – Theatrical Motion Pictures
- There's Something About Mary – Bobby and Peter Farrelly
Visionary Award – Television
- From the Earth to the Moon – Tom Hanks
Milestone Award
- Steven Spielberg

== PGA Hall of Fame ==
Hall of Fame – Motion Pictures
- To Kill a Mockingbird – Alan J. Pakula (1962)
- West Side Story – Robert Wise (1961)
Hall of Fame – Television Programs
- Friendly Fire (1979)
- That Certain Summer (1972)
