= 3rd Golden Laurel Awards =

3rd Annual Golden Laurel Awards
- Date: March 4, 1992
- Location: Beverly Wilshire Hotel, Los Angeles, California
- Country: United States
- Presented by: Producers Guild of America

Highlights
- Best Producer(s) Motion Picture: The Silence of the Lambs – Edward Saxon, Kenneth Utt, and Ronald M. Bozman

The 3rd PGA Golden Laurel Awards, honoring the best film and television producers of 1991, were held at the Beverly Wilshire Hotel in Los Angeles, California on March 4, 1992. The nominees were announced on January 28, 1992.

== Winners and nominees ==
=== Film ===
Outstanding Producer of Theatrical Motion Pictures
- The Silence of the Lambs – Edward Saxon, Kenneth Utt, and Ronald M. Bozman
  - At Play in the Fields of the Lord – Saul Zaentz
  - Boyz n the Hood – Steve Nicolaides
  - The Commitments – Roger Randall-Cutler and Lynda Myles
  - JFK – A. Kitman Ho and Oliver Stone
  - The Prince of Tides – Barbra Streisand and Andrew S. Karsch

=== Television ===
Outstanding Producer of Television
- Brooklyn Bridge (CBS) – Gary David Goldberg
- Northern Exposure (CBS) – Joshua Brand and John Falsey

=== Special ===
Lifetime Achievement Award in Motion Picture
- Pandro S. Berman
Lifetime Achievement Award in Television
- Frederick De Cordova
Most Promising Producer in Theatrical Motion Pictures
- Straight Out of Brooklyn – Matty Rich
Most Promising Producer in Television
- In Living Color – Keenen Ivory Wayans
