= 6th Golden Laurel Awards =

6th Annual Golden Laurel Awards
- Date: March 8, 1995
- Location: Beverly Wilshire Hotel, Los Angeles, California
- Country: United States
- Presented by: Producers Guild of America

Highlights
- Best Producer(s) Motion Picture: Forrest Gump – Wendy Finerman, Charles Newirth, Steve Starkey, and Steve Tisch

The 6th PGA Golden Laurel Awards, honoring the best film and television producers of 1994, were held at the Regent Beverly Wilshire Hotel in Los Angeles, California on March 8, 1995. The nominees were announced on January 26, 1995.

== Winners and nominees ==
=== Film ===
Outstanding Producer of Theatrical Motion Pictures
- Forrest Gump – Wendy Finerman, Charles Newirth, Steve Starkey, and Steve Tisch
  - Four Weddings and a Funeral – Duncan Kenworthy
  - Pulp Fiction – Lawrence Bender
  - Quiz Show – Robert Redford, Michael Jacobs, Julian Krainin, and Michael Nozik
  - The Shawshank Redemption – Niki Marvin

=== Television ===
Outstanding Producer of Episodic Television
- ER (NBC) – Michael Crichton and John Wells
Outstanding Producer of Long-Form Television
- World War II: When Lions Roared – David W. Rintels, Ethel Winant, and Victoria Riskin

=== Special ===
Lifetime Achievement Award in Motion Picture
- Leonard H. Goldenson
Lifetime Achievement Award in Television
- Howard W. Koch
Most Promising Producer in Theatrical Motion Pictures
- Where the Rivers Flow North – Bess O'Brien and Jay Craven
Most Promising Producer in Television
- TV Nation – Michael Moore
Honorary Lifetime Membership Award
- Joel Freeman
