= 1st Golden Laurel Awards =

1st Annual Golden Laurel Awards
- Date: March 28, 1990
- Location: Beverly Wilshire Hotel, Los Angeles, California
- Country: United States
- Presented by: Producers Guild of America

Highlights
- Best Producer(s) Motion Picture: Driving Miss Daisy – Lili Fini Zanuck and Richard D. Zanuck

The 1st PGA Golden Laurel Awards, honoring the best film producers of 1989, were held at the Beverly Wilshire Hotel in Los Angeles, California on March 28, 1990. The awards were presented by Ronald Reagan.

== Winners and nominees ==
=== Film ===
Outstanding Producer of Theatrical Motion Pictures
- Driving Miss Daisy – Lili Fini Zanuck and Richard D. Zanuck

=== Special ===
Lifetime Achievement Award in Motion Picture
- Hal Roach
Lifetime Achievement Award in Television
- David L. Wolper
Honorary Lifetime Membership Award
- Charles B. Fitzsimons
