= 5th Golden Laurel Awards =

5th Annual Golden Laurel Awards
- Date: March 2, 1994
- Location: Beverly Wilshire Hotel, Los Angeles, California
- Country: United States
- Presented by: Producers Guild of America

Highlights
- Best Producer(s) Motion Picture: Schindler's List – Branko Lustig, Gerald R. Molen, and Steven Spielberg

The 5th PGA Golden Laurel Awards, honoring the best film and television producers of 1993, were presented at the Beverly Wilshire Hotel in Los Angeles, California on March 2, 1994, after the winners were announced in February. The ceremony was hosted by Michael Douglas and the nominees were announced on January 19, 1994.

== Winners and nominees ==
=== Film ===
Outstanding Producer of Theatrical Motion Pictures
- Schindler's List – Branko Lustig, Gerald R. Molen, and Steven Spielberg
  - The Fugitive – Arnold Kopelson
  - In the Name of the Father – Jim Sheridan
  - The Piano – Jan Chapman
  - The Remains of the Day – Mike Nichols, John Calley, and Ismail Merchant

=== Television ===
Outstanding Producer of Television
- NYPD Blue (ABC) – Steven Bochco, Gregory Hoblit, and David Milch

=== Special ===
Lifetime Achievement Award in Motion Picture
- Saul Zaentz
Lifetime Achievement Award in Television
- Roy Huggins
Most Promising Producer in Theatrical Motion Pictures
- The Piano – Jan Chapman
Most Promising Producer in Television
- Seinfeld – Larry David and Jerry Seinfeld
Honorary Lifetime Membership Award
- Bob Finkel
