= Eric Roth =

American screenwriter (born 1945)

- Born: March 22, 1945 (age 81); New York City, U.S.
- Education: University of California, Santa Barbara; UCLA School of Theater, Film and Television
- Occupation: Screenwriter
- Years active: 1970–present
- Notable work: Full list
- Spouse: Anne L. Peters
- Children: 5, including Vanessa
- Awards: Full list

Eric R. Roth (born March 22, 1945) is an American screenwriter. He has been nominated six times for the Academy Award for Best Adapted Screenplay: Forrest Gump (1994), The Insider (1999), Munich (2005), The Curious Case of Benjamin Button (2008), A Star Is Born (2018), and Dune (2021), winning for Forrest Gump; he also earned a Best Picture nomination for producing Mank (2020). Roth also worked on the screenplays for the Oscar-nominated films Ali (2001), Extremely Loud & Incredibly Close (2011), and Killers of the Flower Moon (2023).

In 2026, Roth made his playwriting debut on London's West End with his stage adaptation of High Noon.

== Early life and education ==
Roth was born in New York City, New York, into a Jewish family, the son of Miriam "Mimi", a teacher, studio executive, and radio writer, and Leon Roth, a university teacher and film producer. He grew up in Bedford–Stuyvesant, Brooklyn in New York. He grew up boxing and would credit some of his later successes to habits learned from the sport.

Roth went to college at the University of California, Santa Barbara and graduated in 1966. He later attended UCLA Film School as part of the class of 1973.

== Career ==
Roth won the Academy Award for Best Adapted Screenplay for Forrest Gump. He is known for writing his scripts in an obsolete MS-DOS application called Movie Master without Internet access and distributing the scripts only in hard copy formats. He followed his Academy Award win by co-writing screenplays for several Oscar-nominated films, including The Insider, Munich, The Curious Case of Benjamin Button, and A Star Is Born. While writing The Curious Case of Benjamin Button, he lost both of his parents, and as a result views the film as "my most personal movie."

== Personal life ==
Roth lives in Santa Monica, California. He has five children, including documentary filmmaker Vanessa Roth, and filmmakers Geoffrey Roth and Alec Roth; and six grandchildren.

Roth was one of the investors defrauded by Bernard Madoff in a Ponzi scheme via Stanley Chais. He stated that his losses were heavy and he has lost his retirement money, although the full extent is unknown. As a result of the fraud and the associated losses, Roth sued the estate of Chais, who died on September 26, 2010.

== Filmography ==
=== Film ===
As writer

Year	Title	Director	Notes
1970	To Catch a Pebble	James F. Collier	
1974	The Nickel Ride	Robert Mulligan	
1975	The Drowning Pool	Stuart Rosenberg	Uncredited
1979	The Onion Field	Harold Becker	Uncredited
1979	The Concorde... Airport '79	David Lowell Rich	
1981	Wolfen	Michael Wadleigh	Uncredited
1985	Year of the Dragon	Michael Cimino	Uncredited
1987	Suspect	Peter Yates	
1988	Memories of Me	Henry Winkler	with Billy Crystal
1993	Mr. Jones	Mike Figgis	with Michael Cristofer
1994	Forrest Gump	Robert Zemeckis	
1997	The Postman	Kevin Costner	with Brian Helgeland
1998	The Horse Whisperer	Robert Redford	with Richard LaGravenese
1999	The Insider	Michael Mann	with Mann
2001	Ali	Michael Mann	with Mann, Stephen J. Rivele and Christopher Wilkinson
2005	Munich	Steven Spielberg	with Tony Kushner
2006	The Good Shepherd	Robert De Niro	
2007	Lucky You	Curtis Hanson	with Hanson
2008	The Curious Case of Benjamin Button	David Fincher	
2011	Extremely Loud & Incredibly Close	Stephen Daldry	
2015	Ellis	JR	Short film
2018	A Star Is Born	Bradley Cooper	with Cooper and Will Fetters
2020	Mank	David Fincher	Uncredited; also producer
2021	Dune	Denis Villeneuve	with Villeneuve and Jon Spaihts
2023	Killers of the Flower Moon	Martin Scorsese	with Scorsese
2024	Dune: Part Two	Denis Villeneuve	Additional literary material
2024	Here	Robert Zemeckis	with Zemeckis

=== Television ===
Year	Title	Writer	Executive Producer	Notes
1972	The Strangers in 7A	Yes	No	TV movie
1992	The Heights	Yes	No	Co-creator
1994	Jane's House	Yes	No	TV movie
2011–2012	Luck	Yes	Yes	
2013–2017	House of Cards	No	Yes	
2016–2018	Berlin Station	No	Yes	
2018	The Alienist	No	Yes	
2020	The Alienist: Angel of Darkness	No	Yes	
2024	Before	No	Yes	

== Awards and nominations ==
Organizations	Year	Category	Work	Result	Ref.
Academy Awards	1994	Best Adapted Screenplay	Forrest Gump	Won	
Academy Awards	1999	Best Adapted Screenplay	The Insider	Nominated	
Academy Awards	2005	Best Adapted Screenplay	Munich	Nominated	
Academy Awards	2008	Best Adapted Screenplay	The Curious Case of Benjamin Button	Nominated	
Academy Awards	2018	Best Adapted Screenplay	A Star Is Born	Nominated	
Academy Awards	2020	Best Picture	Mank	Nominated	
Academy Awards	2021	Best Adapted Screenplay	Dune	Nominated	
British Academy Film Awards	1995	Best Adapted Screenplay	Forrest Gump	Nominated	
British Academy Film Awards	2008	Best Adapted Screenplay	The Curious Case of Benjamin Button	Nominated	
British Academy Film Awards	2018	Best Adapted Screenplay	A Star Is Born	Nominated	
British Academy Film Awards	2021	Best Adapted Screenplay	Dune	Nominated	
Critics' Choice Movie Awards	2009	Best Writer	The Curious Case of Benjamin Button	Nominated	
Critics' Choice Movie Awards	2012	Best Adapted Screenplay	Extremely Loud & Incredibly Close	Nominated	
Critics' Choice Movie Awards	2019	Best Adapted Screenplay	A Star Is Born	Nominated	
Critics' Choice Movie Awards	2022	Best Adapted Screenplay	Dune	Nominated	
Critics' Choice Movie Awards	2024	Best Adapted Screenplay	Killers of the Flower Moon	Nominated	
Golden Globe Awards	1994	Best Screenplay - Motion Picture	Forrest Gump	Nominated	
Golden Globe Awards	1999	Best Screenplay - Motion Picture	The Insider	Nominated	
Golden Globe Awards	2005	Best Screenplay - Motion Picture	Munich	Nominated	
Golden Globe Awards	2008	Best Screenplay - Motion Picture	The Curious Case of Benjamin Button	Nominated	
Golden Globe Awards	2023	Best Screenplay - Motion Picture	Killers of the Flower Moon	Nominated	
Primetime Emmy Awards	2013	Outstanding Drama Series	House of Cards	Nominated	
Primetime Emmy Awards	2014	Outstanding Drama Series	House of Cards	Nominated	
Primetime Emmy Awards	2015	Outstanding Drama Series	House of Cards	Nominated	
Primetime Emmy Awards	2016	Outstanding Drama Series	House of Cards	Nominated	
Primetime Emmy Awards	2017	Outstanding Drama Series	House of Cards	Nominated	
Primetime Emmy Awards	2018	Outstanding Limited Series	The Alienist	Nominated	
Primetime Emmy Awards	2026	Outstanding Writing for a Variety Special	The Oscars	Nominated	
Producers Guild of America Awards	2014	Best Episodic Drama	House of Cards	Nominated	
Producers Guild of America Awards	2015	Best Episodic Drama	House of Cards	Nominated	
Producers Guild of America Awards	2016	Best Episodic Drama	House of Cards	Nominated	
Producers Guild of America Awards	2017	Best Episodic Drama	House of Cards	Nominated	
Satellite Awards	2008	Best Screenplay - Adapted	The Curious Case of Benjamin Button	Nominated	
Satellite Awards	2019	Best Screenplay - Adapted	A Star Is Born	Nominated	
Satellite Awards	2022	Best Screenplay - Adapted	Dune	Nominated	
Satellite Awards	2024	Best Screenplay - Adapted	Killers of the Flower Moon	Nominated	
Writers Guild of America Awards	1994	Best Adapted Screenplay	Forrest Gump	Won	
Writers Guild of America Awards	1999	Best Adapted Screenplay	The Insider	Nominated	
Writers Guild of America Awards	1999	Paul Selvin Award	The Insider	Won	
Writers Guild of America Awards	2008	Best Adapted Screenplay	The Curious Case of Benjamin Button	Nominated	
Writers Guild of America Awards	2011	Laurel Award for Screenwriting Achievement		Won	
Writers Guild of America Awards	2018	Best Adapted Screenplay	A Star Is Born	Nominated	
Writers Guild of America Awards	2021	Best Adapted Screenplay	Dune	Nominated	
Writers Guild of America Awards	2023	Best Adapted Screenplay	Killers of the Flower Moon	Nominated	

== See also ==
- List of Jewish Academy Award winners and nominees
