= Producers Guild of America Award for Best Long-Form Television =

- Awarded for: Outstanding Production of Long-Form Television
- Country: United States
- Presented by: Producers Guild of America
- First award: 1994
- Final award: 2017

The Producers Guild of America Award for Best Long-Form Television, also known as the David L. Wolper Award for Outstanding Producer of Long-Form Television was an annual award given by the Producers Guild of America between 1994 and 2017. In 2018, the guild announced the creation of two new accolades to replace the award: the David L. Wolper Award for Outstanding Producer of Limited Series Television and the Award for Outstanding Producer of Streamed or Televised Movies.

== Winners and nominees ==
=== 1990s ===
Year	Winners and nominees	Network	Ref.
1994 (6th)	World War II: When Lions Roared	NBC	
1995 (7th)	Truman	HBO	
1995 (7th)	Kissinger & Nixon	TNT	
1996 (8th)	Prime Suspect: The Lost Child	PBS	
1997 (9th)	Miss Evers' Boys	HBO	
1998 (10th)	From the Earth to the Moon	HBO	
1999 (11th)	Tuesdays with Morrie	ABC	
1999 (11th)	The Century: America's Time	ABC	
1999 (11th)	Dash and Lilly	A&E	
1999 (11th)	The Passion of Ayn Rand	Showtime	
1999 (11th)	Pirates of Silicon Valley	TNT	

=== 2000s ===
Year	Winners and nominees	Network	Ref.
2000 (12th)	Death of a Salesman	Showtime	
2000 (12th)	Fail Safe	CBS	
2000 (12th)	If These Walls Could Talk 2	HBO	
2000 (12th)	Nuremberg	Alliance Atlantis	
2000 (12th)	Walking with Dinosaurs	BBC	
2001 (13th)	Band of Brothers	HBO	
2001 (13th)	61*	HBO	
2001 (13th)	Anne Frank: The Whole Story	ABC	
2001 (13th)	Life with Judy Garland: Me and My Shadows	ABC	
2001 (13th)	Wit	HBO	
2002 (14th)	Live from Baghdad	HBO	
2002 (14th)	The Gathering Storm	HBO	
2002 (14th)	The Laramie Project	HBO	
2002 (14th)	Path to War	HBO	
2002 (14th)	Shackleton	A&E	
2003 (15th)	My House in Umbria	HBO	
2003 (15th)	And Starring Pancho Villa as Himself	HBO	
2003 (15th)	Hitler: The Rise of Evil	CBS	
2003 (15th)	Normal	HBO	
2003 (15th)	The Pentagon Papers	FX	
2004 (16th)	Angels in America	HBO	
2004 (16th)	Hornblower (Loyalty; Duty)	A&E	
2004 (16th)	Ike: Countdown to D-Day	A&E	
2004 (16th)	The Lion in Winter	Showtime	
2004 (16th)	Something the Lord Made	HBO	
2005 (17th)	The Life and Death of Peter Sellers	HBO	
2005 (17th)	Empire Falls	HBO	
2005 (17th)	Into the West	TNT	
2005 (17th)	Lackawanna Blues	HBO	
2005 (17th)	Warm Springs	HBO	
2006 (18th)	Elizabeth I	HBO	
2006 (18th)	Bleak House	BBC	
2006 (18th)	Flight 93	A&E	
2006 (18th)	High School Musical	Disney Channel	
2006 (18th)	Mrs. Harris	HBO	
2007 (19th)	Bury My Heart at Wounded Knee	HBO	
2007 (19th)	The Bronx Is Burning	ESPN	
2007 (19th)	High School Musical 2	Disney Channel	
2007 (19th)	Jane Eyre	BBC One	
2007 (19th)	The Starter Wife	USA Network	
2008 (20th)	John Adams	HBO	
2008 (20th)	24: Redemption	Fox	
2008 (20th)	Bernard and Doris	HBO	
2008 (20th)	A Raisin in the Sun	ABC	
2008 (20th)	Recount	HBO	
2009 (21st)	Grey Gardens	HBO	
2009 (21st)	Georgia O'Keeffe	Lifetime	
2009 (21st)	Little Dorrit	BBC One	
2009 (21st)	Prayers for Bobby	Lifetime	
2009 (21st)	The Prisoner	AMC	
2009 (21st)	Taking Chance	HBO	

=== 2010s ===
Year	Winners and nominees	Network	Ref.
2010 (22nd)	The Pacific	HBO	
2010 (22nd)	Agatha Christie's Poirot: "Murder on the Orient Express"	ITV	
2010 (22nd)	The Pillars of the Earth	Starz	
2010 (22nd)	Temple Grandin	HBO	
2010 (22nd)	You Don't Know Jack	HBO	
2011 (23rd)	Downton Abbey (series 1)	PBS	
2011 (23rd)	Cinema Verite	HBO	
2011 (23rd)	The Kennedys	ReelzChannel	
2011 (23rd)	Mildred Pierce	HBO	
2011 (23rd)	Too Big to Fail	HBO	
2012 (24th)	Game Change	HBO	
2012 (24th)	American Horror Story	FX	
2012 (24th)	The Dust Bowl	PBS	
2012 (24th)	Hatfields & McCoys	History	
2012 (24th)	Sherlock	BBC One	
2013 (25th)	Behind the Candelabra	HBO	
2013 (25th)	American Horror Story: Asylum	FX	
2013 (25th)	Killing Kennedy	Nat Geo	
2013 (25th)	Phil Spector	HBO	
2013 (25th)	Top of the Lake	Sundance Channel	
2014 (26th)	Fargo (season 1)	FX	
2014 (26th)	American Horror Story (Coven; Freak Show)	FX	
2014 (26th)	The Normal Heart	HBO	
2014 (26th)	The Roosevelts: An Intimate History	PBS	
2014 (26th)	Sherlock	PBS	
2015 (27th)	Fargo (season 2)	FX	
2015 (27th)	American Crime	ABC	
2015 (27th)	American Horror Story: Hotel	FX	
2015 (27th)	True Detective (season 2)	HBO	
2015 (27th)	A Very Murray Christmas	Netflix	
2016 (28th)	The People v. O. J. Simpson: American Crime Story	FX	
2016 (28th)	Black Mirror (season 3)	Netflix	
2016 (28th)	The Night Manager	AMC	
2016 (28th)	The Night Of	HBO	
2016 (28th)	Sherlock: The Abominable Bride	PBS	
2017 (29th)	Black Mirror (season 4)	Netflix	
2017 (29th)	Fargo (season 3)	FX	
2017 (29th)	Feud: Bette and Joan	FX	
2017 (29th)	Sherlock: The Lying Detective	PBS	
2017 (29th)	The Wizard of Lies	HBO	

== Total awards by network ==
- HBO – 15
- FX – 3
- PBS – 2
- ABC – 1
- NBC – 1
- Netflix – 1
- Showtime – 1

== Programs with multiple nominations ==
4 nominations

- American Horror Story
- Sherlock

3 nominations

- Fargo

2 nominations

- Black Mirror

== Programs with multiple awards ==
2 awards

- Fargo (consecutive)
