= Keith Redmon =

American film producer

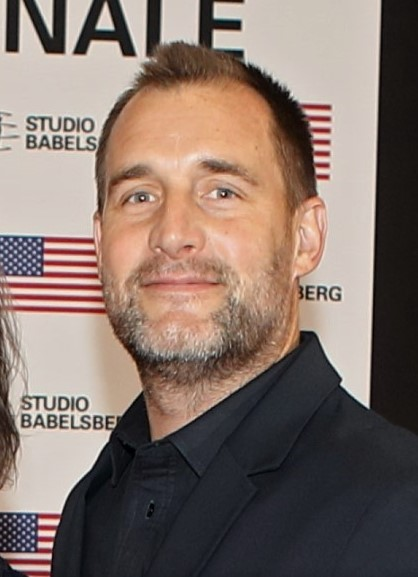
- Keith Redmon, 2018
- Occupations: Film and television producer
- Years active: 2007–present

Keith Redmon is an American film and television, executive and producer, best known for producing the 2015 film The Revenant. The film was nominated for the BAFTA Award for Best Film at the 69th British Academy Film Awards, the Academy Award for Best Picture at the 88th Academy Awards, and Producers Guild of America Award for Best Theatrical Motion Picture at the Producers Guild of America Awards 2015. Redmon has worked for the companies Propaganda Films, Anonymous Content, Black Bear Pictures, and Vendôme.

== Filmography ==
He was a producer in all films unless otherwise noted.

=== Film ===
Year	Film	Credit
2007	Rendition	Executive producer
2011	The Beaver	
2012	The Last Elvis	Executive producer
2013	Scenic Route	Executive producer
2015	The Revenant	
2016	Triple 9	
2020	The Midnight Sky	
2023	The Marsh King's Daughter	

Thanks

Year	Film	Role
2005	Hard Candy	Thanks
2006	Kill Your Darlings	Special thanks
2017	Kissing Candice	Special thanks

=== Television ===
Year	Title	Credit
2012	Awake	
2014	Mind Games	Executive producer
2016	Quarry	Executive producer
2016−18	Berlin Station	Executive producer
2017−19	Counterpart	Executive producer
2019	Wild Bill	Executive producer
TBA	The 39 Steps	Executive producer
TBA	Velvet	Executive producer
