= 2nd Golden Laurel Awards =

2nd Annual Golden Laurel Awards
- Date: March 5, 1991
- Location: Beverly Wilshire Hotel, Los Angeles, California
- Country: United States
- Presented by: Producers Guild of America

Highlights
- Best Producer(s) Motion Picture: Dances with Wolves – Jim Wilson and Kevin Costner

The 2nd PGA Golden Laurel Awards, honoring the best film and television producers of 1990, were presented at the Beverly Wilshire Hotel in Los Angeles, California on March 5, 1991 after the winners were announced in February. The awards were presented by Ted Turner.

== Winners and nominees ==
=== Film ===
Outstanding Producer of Theatrical Motion Pictures
- Dances with Wolves – Jim Wilson and Kevin Costner

=== Television ===
Outstanding Producer of Television
- The Civil War – Ken and Ric Burns

=== Special ===
Lifetime Achievement Award in Motion Picture
- Stanley Kramer
Lifetime Achievement Award in Television
- Grant Tinker
Honorary Lifetime Membership Award
- Stanley Rubin
