= 8th Golden Laurel Awards =

8th Annual Golden Laurel Awards
- Date: March 12, 1997
- Location: Universal Hilton Hotel, Hollywood, California
- Country: United States
- Presented by: Producers Guild of America

Highlights
- Best Producer(s) Motion Picture: The English Patient – Saul Zaentz

The 8th PGA Golden Laurel Awards, honoring the best film and television producers of 1996, were held at Universal Hilton Hotel in Hollywood, California on March 12, 1997. The motion picture nominees were announced on January 22, 1997, and the television nominees on February 20, 1997.

== Winners and nominees ==
=== Film ===
Outstanding Producer of Theatrical Motion Pictures
- The English Patient – Saul Zaentz
  - Shine – Jane Scott
  - Fargo – Ethan Coen
  - Hamlet – David Barron
  - The People vs. Larry Flynt – Oliver Stone, Janet Yang and Michael Hausman

=== Television ===
Outstanding Producer of Episodic Television
- Law & Order – Dick Wolf, Edwin Sherin, Michael S. Chernuchin, René Balcer, Ed Zuckerman, Arthur W. Forney, Gardner Stern, Jeffrey M. Hayes, Lewis Gould, Billy Fox and Jeremy R. Littman
Outstanding Producer of Long-Form Television
- Prime Suspect: The Lost Child – Rebecca Eaton, Sally Head, Paul Marcus and Brian Park

=== Special ===
Lifetime Achievement Award in Motion Picture
- Billy Wilder
Lifetime Achievement Award in Television
- Edgar J. Scherick
Most Promising Producer in Theatrical Motion Pictures
- Mission: Impossible – Tom Cruise and Paula Wagner
Most Promising Producer in Television
- Touched by an Angel and Promised Land – Martha Williamson
Honorary Lifetime Membership Award
- Norman Felton
Visionary Award – Theatrical Motion Pictures
- The English Patient – Saul Zaentz
Visionary Award – Television
- The Great War and the Shaping of the 20th Century – Blaine Baggett, Jay Winter, and Carl Byker

== PGA Hall of Fame ==
Hall of Fame – Motion Pictures
- 12 Angry Men (1957)
- All About Eve (1950)
- A Place in the Sun (1951)
Hall of Fame – Television Programs
- Eleanor and Franklin (1976)
- Holocaust (1978)
- The Missiles of October (1974)
