= 4th Golden Laurel Awards =

4th Annual Golden Laurel Awards
- Date: March 3, 1993
- Location: Beverly Wilshire Hotel, Los Angeles, California
- Country: United States
- Presented by: Producers Guild of America

Highlights
- Best Producer(s) Motion Picture: The Crying Game – Stephen Woolley

The 4th PGA Golden Laurel Awards, honoring the best film and television producers of 1992, were presented at the Beverly Wilshire Hotel in Los Angeles, California on March 3, 1993 after the winners were announced in February. The ceremony was hosted by James Earl Jones and the nominees were announced on February 3, 1993.

== Winners and nominees ==
=== Film ===
Outstanding Producer of Theatrical Motion Pictures
- The Crying Game – Stephen Woolley
  - A Few Good Men – Rob Reiner, David Brown, and Andrew Scheinman
  - Howards End – Ismail Merchant
  - Scent of a Woman – Martin Brest
  - Unforgiven – Clint Eastwood

=== Television ===
Outstanding Producer of Television
- I'll Fly Away (NBC) – David Chase and Ian Sander

=== Special ===
Lifetime Achievement Award in Motion Picture
- David Brown and Richard D. Zanuck
Lifetime Achievement Award in Television
- Don Hewitt
Most Promising Producer in Theatrical Motion Pictures
- My Own Private Idaho – Laurie Parker
Most Promising Producer in Television
- A Different World – Susan Fales-Hill
Honorary Lifetime Membership Award
- Leonard B. Stern
