= Producers Guild of America Award for Outstanding Sports Program =

- Awarded for: Outstanding Sports Program
- Country: United States
- Presented by: Producers Guild of America
- First award: 2011
- Currently held by: Formula 1: Drive to Survive (2025)

The Producers Guild of America Award for Outstanding Sports Program is an annual award given by the Producers Guild of America since 2011.

== Winners and nominees ==
=== 2010s ===
Year	Winners and nominees	Network	Ref.
2011 (23rd)	30 for 30	ESPN	
2011 (23rd)	2010 FIFA World Cup	ABC / ESPN / ESPN2	
2011 (23rd)	2011 US Open	CBS / ESPN2 / Tennis Channel	
2011 (23rd)	Monday Night Football	ESPN	
2011 (23rd)	Real Sports with Bryant Gumbel	HBO	
2011 (23rd)	SportsCenter	ESPN	
2012 (24th)	Real Sports with Bryant Gumbel	HBO	
2012 (24th)	24/7	HBO	
2012 (24th)	30 for 30: Catching Hell	ESPN	
2012 (24th)	The Fight Game with Jim Lampley	HBO	
2012 (24th)	On Freddie Roach	HBO	
2013 (25th)	SportsCenter	ESPN	
2013 (25th)	24/7	HBO	
2013 (25th)	Hard Knocks	HBO	
2013 (25th)	Monday Night Football	ESPN	
2013 (25th)	Real Sports with Bryant Gumbel	HBO	
2014 (26th)	Real Sports with Bryant Gumbel	HBO	
2014 (26th)	24/7	HBO	
2014 (26th)	Hard Knocks: Training Camp With The Atlanta Falcons	HBO	
2014 (26th)	Hard Knocks: Training Camp With The Cincinnati Bengals	HBO	
2014 (26th)	Inside: U.S. Soccer's March to Brazil	ESPN	
2015 (27th)	Real Sports with Bryant Gumbel	HBO	
2015 (27th)	Back on Board: Greg Louganis	HBO	
2015 (27th)	E:60	ESPN	
2015 (27th)	Hard Knocks: Training Camp With the Houston Texans	HBO	
2015 (27th)	Kareem: Minority of One	HBO	
2016 (28th)	Real Sports with Bryant Gumbel (season 22)	HBO	
2016 (28th)	VICE World of Sports (season 1)	VICELAND	
2016 (28th)	E:60	ESPN	
2016 (28th)	The Fight Game with Jim Lampley: A Tribute to Muhammad Ali	HBO	
2016 (28th)	Hard Knocks: Training Camp with the Los Angeles Rams	HBO	
2017 (29th)	Real Sports with Bryant Gumbel (season 23)	HBO	
2017 (29th)	All or Nothing: A Season with the Los Angeles Rams (season 2)	Amazon	
2017 (29th)	Hard Knocks: Training Camp with the Tampa Bay Buccaneers	HBO	
2017 (29th)	SportsCenter with Scott Van Pelt (season 3)	ESPN	
2017 (29th)	VICE World of Sports (season 2)	VICELAND	
2018 (30th)	Being Serena (season 1)	HBO	
2018 (30th)	E:60	ESPN	
2018 (30th)	Hard Knocks: Training Camp with the Cleveland Browns	HBO	
2018 (30th)	Real Sports with Bryant Gumbel (season 24)	HBO	
2018 (30th)	SportsCenter with Scott Van Pelt (season 4)	ESPN	
2019 (31st)	What's My Name: Muhammad Ali	HBO	
2019 (31st)	Hard Knocks: Training Camp with the Oakland Raiders	HBO	
2019 (31st)	Lindsey Vonn: The Final Season	HBO	
2019 (31st)	Real Sports with Bryant Gumbel (season 25)	HBO	
2019 (31st)	SportsCenter With Scott Van Pelt (season 5)	ESPN	

=== 2020s ===
Year	Winners and nominees	Network	Ref.
2020 (32nd)	Defying Gravity: The Untold Story of Women's Gymnastics (season 1)	YouTube	
2020 (32nd)	Hard Knocks: Los Angeles	HBO	
2020 (32nd)	Real Sports with Bryant Gumbel (season 26)	HBO	
2020 (32nd)	Seeing America with Megan Rapinoe	HBO	
2020 (32nd)	The Shop: Uninterrupted Featuring President Barack Obama	HBO	
2021 (33rd)	100 Foot Wave (season 1)	HBO	
2021 (33rd)	Formula 1: Drive to Survive (season 3)	Netflix	
2021 (33rd)	Naomi Osaka (season 1)	Netflix	
2021 (33rd)	Real Sports with Bryant Gumbel (season 27)	HBO	
2021 (33rd)	Tiger	HBO	
2022 (34th)	Tony Hawk: Until the Wheels Fall Off	Hulu	
2022 (34th)	Formula 1: Drive to Survive (season 4)	Netflix	
2022 (34th)	Hard Knocks: Training Camp with the Detroit Lions	HBO	
2022 (34th)	Legacy: The True Story of the LA Lakers (season 1)	Hulu	
2022 (34th)	McEnroe	Showtime	
2023 (35th)	Beckham (season 1)	Netflix	
2023 (35th)	100 Foot Wave (season 2)	HBO	
2023 (35th)	Formula 1: Drive to Survive (season 5)	Netflix	
2023 (35th)	Hard Knocks: Training Camp with the New York Jets	HBO	
2023 (35th)	Shaun White: The Last Run (season 1)	Max	
2024 (36th)	Simone Biles Rising	Netflix	
2024 (36th)	Formula 1: Drive to Survive (season 6)	Netflix	
2024 (36th)	Hard Knocks: Offseason with the New York Giants	HBO	
2024 (36th)	Messi's World Cup: The Rise of a Legend	Apple TV+	
2024 (36th)	Triumph: Jesse Owens and the Berlin Olympics	History Channel	
2025 (37th)	Formula 1: Drive to Survive (season 7)	Netflix	
2025 (37th)	100 Foot Wave (season 3)	HBO	
2025 (37th)	Big Dreams: The Little League World Series 2024	ESPN	
2025 (37th)	Hard Knocks: Training Camp with the Buffalo Bills	HBO	
2025 (37th)	Surf Girls: International	Amazon	

== Total awards by network ==
- HBO – 7
- Netflix – 3
- ESPN – 2
- Hulu – 1
- VICELAND – 1
- YouTube – 1

== Programs with multiple awards ==
5 awards

- Real Sports with Bryant Gumbel (4 consecutive)

== Programs with multiple nominations ==
13 nominations

- Hard Knocks

11 nominations

- Real Sports with Bryant Gumbel

5 nominations

- Formula 1: Drive to Survive
- SportsCenter

3 nominations

- 100 Foot Wave
- 24/7
- E:30

2 nominations

- 30 for 30
- Monday Night Football
- The Fight Game with Jim Lampley
- VICE World of Sports
