= 9th Golden Laurel Awards =

9th Annual Golden Laurel Awards
- Date: March 3, 1998
- Location: The Beverly Hilton, Beverly Hills, California
- Country: United States
- Presented by: Producers Guild of America

Highlights
- Best Producer(s) Motion Picture: Titanic – James Cameron and Jon Landau

The 9th PGA Golden Laurel Awards, honoring the best film and television producers of 1997, were held at The Beverly Hilton in Beverly Hills, California on March 3, 1998.

== Winners and nominees ==
=== Film ===
Outstanding Producer of Theatrical Motion Pictures
- Titanic – James Cameron and Jon Landau
  - Amistad – Steven Spielberg, Debbie Allen, and Colin Wilson
  - As Good as It Gets – James L. Brooks, Bridget Johnson, and Kristi Zea
  - Good Will Hunting – Lawrence Bender
  - L.A. Confidential – Arnon Milchan, Curtis Hanson, and Michael G. Nathanson

=== Television ===
Outstanding Producer of Episodic Television
- Biography – Michael Cascio, CarolAnne Dolan, and Diane Ferenczi
Outstanding Producer of Long-Form Television
- Miss Evers' Boys – Robert Benedetti, Laurence Fishburne, Derek Kavanagh, Kip Konwiser, Kern Konwiser, and Peter Stelzer

=== Special ===
Lifetime Achievement Award in Motion Picture
- Clint Eastwood
Lifetime Achievement Award in Television
- Garry Marshall
Most Promising Producer in Theatrical Motion Pictures
- The Full Monty – Uberto Pasolini
Most Promising Producer in Television
- South Park – Trey Parker and Matt Stone
Honorary Lifetime Membership Award
- Garry Marshall
Visionary Award – Theatrical Motion Pictures
- Amistad – Steven Spielberg, Debbie Allen, and Colin Wilson
Visionary Award – Television
- Lewis & Clark: The Journey of the Corps of Discovery – Ken Burns
Milestone Award
- Robert A. Daly & Terry Semel

== PGA Hall of Fame ==
Hall of Fame – Motion Pictures
- The Graduate – Lawrence Turman (1967)
- The Sting – Tony Bill, Julia Phillips, and Michael Phillips (1973)
Hall of Fame – Television Programs
- Brian's Song – Paul Junger Witt
- War and Remembrance – Dan Curtis
