= Cathleen Sutherland =

American film producer

Cathleen Sutherland is an American film producer. She was nominated for the Academy Award in the category of Best Picture for the 2014 film Boyhood at the 87th Academy Awards.

Sutherland is a graduate of the University of Texas at Austin.
