= 18th Producers Guild of America Awards =

18th Annual Producers Guild Awards
- Date: January 20, 2007
- Location: The Century Plaza Hotel, Los Angeles, California
- Country: United States
- Presented by: Producers Guild of America

Highlights
- Best Producer(s) Motion Picture: Little Miss Sunshine – Marc Turtletaub, David T. Friendly, Peter Saraf, Albert Berger, and Ron Yerxa
- Best Producer(s) Animated Feature: Cars – Darla K. Anderson

The 18th Producers Guild of America Awards (also known as 2007 Producers Guild Awards), honoring the best film and television producers of 2006, were held at The Century Plaza Hotel in Los Angeles, California on January 20, 2007. The nominations were announced on December 4, 2006, and January 3, 2007.

== Winners and nominees ==
=== Film ===
Darryl F. Zanuck Award for Outstanding Producer of Theatrical Motion Pictures
- Little Miss Sunshine – Albert Berger, David T. Friendly, Peter Saraf, Marc Turtletaub, and Ron Yerxa
  - Babel – Steve Golin, Alejandro González Iñárritu, and Jon Kilik
  - The Departed – Graham King
  - Dreamgirls – Laurence Mark
  - The Queen – Andy Harries, Christine Langan, and Tracey Seaward
Outstanding Producer of Animated Theatrical Motion Pictures
- Cars – Darla K. Anderson
  - Flushed Away – Cecil Kramer and Peter Lord
  - Happy Feet – Bill Miller, George Miller, and Doug Mitchell
  - Ice Age: The Meltdown – Lori Forte
  - Monster House – Jack Rapke and Steve Starkey

=== Television ===
Norman Felton Award for Outstanding Producer of Episodic Television, Drama
- Grey's Anatomy
  - 24
  - House
  - Lost
  - The Sopranos
Danny Thomas Award for Outstanding Producer of Episodic Television, Comedy
- The Office
  - Arrested Development
  - Curb Your Enthusiasm
  - My Name Is Earl
  - Weeds
David L. Wolper Award for Outstanding Producer of Long-Form Television
- Elizabeth I
  - Bleak House
  - Flight 93
  - High School Musical
  - Mrs. Harris
Outstanding Producer of Non-Fiction Television
- 60 Minutes
  - The Amazing Race
  - American Idol
  - Dancing with the Stars
  - Project Runway
Outstanding Producer of Variety Television
- Real Time with Bill Maher
  - The Ellen DeGeneres Show
  - Late Night with Conan O'Brien
  - Late Show with David Letterman
  - The XX Olympic Winter Games: Opening Ceremony

=== David O. Selznick Achievement Award in Theatrical Motion Pictures ===
- Douglas Wick and Lucy Fisher

=== Milestone Award ===
- Ronald Meyer

=== Norman Lear Achievement Award in Television ===
- Jerry Bruckheimer

=== Stanley Kramer Award ===
Awarded to the motion picture that best illuminates social issues.

- An Inconvenient Truth

=== Vanguard Award ===
Awarded in recognition of outstanding achievement in new media and technology.

- Will Wright

=== Visionary Award ===
Honored to a producer exemplifying unique or uplifting quality.

- Kenneth Ehrlich
