= 17th Producers Guild of America Awards =

17th Annual Producers Guild Awards
- Date: January 22, 2006
- Location: Universal Hilton Hotel, Hollywood, California
- Country: United States
- Presented by: Producers Guild of America
- Hosted by: Queen Latifah

Highlights
- Best Producer(s) Motion Picture: Brokeback Mountain – Diana Ossana and James Schamus
- Best Producer(s) Animated Feature: Wallace & Gromit: The Curse of the Were-Rabbit – Claire Jennings and Nick Park

The 17th Producers Guild of America Awards (also known as 2006 Producers Guild Awards), honoring the best film and television producers of 2005, were held on January 22, 2006. The ceremony at the Universal Hilton Hotel in Hollywood, California was hosted by Queen Latifah. The nominations were announced on January 4, 2006. The award for Outstanding Producer of Animated Theatrical Motion Pictures was given out for the first time at this ceremony.

== Winners and nominees ==
=== Film ===
Darryl F. Zanuck Award for Outstanding Producer of Theatrical Motion Pictures
- Brokeback Mountain – Diana Ossana and James Schamus
  - Capote – Caroline Baron, William Vince, and Michael Ohoven
  - Crash – Paul Haggis and Cathy Schulman
  - Good Night, and Good Luck – Grant Heslov
  - Walk the Line – James Keach and Cathy Konrad
Outstanding Producer of Animated Theatrical Motion Pictures
- Wallace & Gromit: The Curse of the Were-Rabbit – Claire Jennings and Nick Park
  - Chicken Little – Randy Fullmer
  - Corpse Bride – Tim Burton and Allison Abbate
  - Madagascar – Mireille Soria
  - Robots – Jerry Davis, John C. Donkin, and William Joyce

=== Television ===
Norman Felton Award for Outstanding Producer of Episodic Television, Drama
- Lost
  - 24
  - Boston Legal
  - Grey's Anatomy
  - Six Feet Under
Danny Thomas Award for Outstanding Producer of Episodic Television, Comedy
- Entourage
  - Arrested Development
  - Curb Your Enthusiasm
  - Desperate Housewives
  - Two and a Half Men
David L. Wolper Award for Outstanding Producer of Long-Form Television
- The Life and Death of Peter Sellers
  - Empire Falls
  - Into the West
  - Lackawanna Blues
  - Warm Springs
Outstanding Producer of Non-Fiction Television
- 60 Minutes
  - 30 Days
  - The Amazing Race (season 6)
  - The Amazing Race (season 7)
  - Extreme Makeover: Home Edition
Outstanding Producer of Variety Television
- The Ellen DeGeneres Show
  - 77th Annual Academy Awards
  - Late Night with Conan O'Brien
  - Late Show with David Letterman
  - Real Time with Bill Maher

=== David O. Selznick Achievement Award in Theatrical Motion Pictures ===
- Roger Corman

=== Milestone Award ===
- Clint Eastwood

=== Producers Guild Achievement Award in Television ===
- Norman Lear

=== Stanley Kramer Award ===
Awarded to the motion picture that best illuminates social issues.

- Good Night, and Good Luck

=== Vanguard Award ===
Awarded in recognition of outstanding achievement in new media and technology.

- Jonathan Miller
