= Ron Bozman =

American film producer

- Born: Dallas, Texas, U.S.
- Education: Rice University
- Occupation: Film producer
- Years active: 1974–current
- Notable work: The Silence of the Lambs; The Texas Chain Saw Massacre (1974)
- Spouse: Kyle McCarthy
- Children: One
- Awards: Academy Award for Best Picture; 1992 The Silence of the Lambs Producers Guild of America Motion Picture Producer of the Year Award; 1992 The Silence of the Lambs

Ron Bozman is an American film producer who won an Academy Award for Best Picture in 1991 for the film The Silence of the Lambs.

== Early life and education ==
Bozman was born in Dallas, Texas. He grew up in Garland, Texas, graduating from Garland High School in 1965. He graduated from Rice University with a Bachelor of Arts degree in psychology in 1969.

== Career ==
Bozman broke into the film business in 1974 when he was a production manager for the film The Texas Chain Saw Massacre, a low-budget horror movie that developed a cult following.

He was a first assistant director on a string of successful movies through the 1980s, including The Muppets Take Manhattan, Something Wild and Married to the Mob. He then went on to be a full producer on Waiting for the Light (1990) and The Silence of the Lambs (1991).

In 1991, Bozman won the Academy Award for Best Picture as one of the producers of Jonathan Demme's The Silence of the Lambs—one of only three films to win all the major categories in that competition (Best Picture, Best Director, Best Screenplay, Best Actor, and Best Actress).

Two years later, Bozman was an executive producer on Philadelphia, another film directed by Demme, which won two Academy Awards.

Bozman also produced The Ref, Eddie, Beloved, For Love of the Game, Changing Lanes, The Human Stain, The Stepford Wives, Failure to Launch, Perfect Stranger, and Confessions of a Shopaholic.

== Filmography ==
Year	Film	Role
1974	The Texas Chain Saw Massacre	Production manager
1984	The Muppets Take Manhattan	First assistant director
1986	Something Wild	First assistant director
1988	Married to the Mob	First assistant director
1990	Waiting for the Light	Producer
1991	The Silence of the Lambs	Producer
1993	Philadelphia	Executive producer
1994	The Ref	Producer
1996	Eddie	Producer
1998	Beloved	Producer
1999	For Love of the Game	Producer
2002	Changing Lanes	Producer
2003	The Human Stain	Producer
2004	The Stepford Wives	Producer
2006	Failure to Launch	Producer
2007	Perfect Stranger	Producer
2009	Confessions of a Shopaholic	Producer

== Personal life ==
Bozman lives in New York City, with his wife Kyle McCarthy and his son Regan.
