= Edward H. Hamm Jr. =

American producer

Edward H. Hamm Jr. is an American producer, known for his collaboration with Sean McKittrick. He was nominated for the Palme d'Or at the 2006 Cannes Film Festival, for Southland Tales.

In 2017, Get Out earned him many accolades nominations including Academy Award for Best Picture at the 90th Academy Awards. He also co-founded the production companies Darko Entertainment and QC Entertainment.

== Filmography ==
- TBA: Alcoholics Unanimous (producer) (pre-production)
- TBA: No Angel (producer) (pre-production)
- TBA: The Oath (producer) (filming)
- 2018: A Night Worth Living (producer) (pre-production)
- 2018: BlacKkKlansman (producer)
- 2018: Time Freak (executive producer)
- 2018: A Futile and Stupid Gesture (executive producer)
- 2017: Band Aid (executive producer)
- 2017: Get Out (producer - produced by)
- 2016: Happy Birthday (producer)
- 2016: Green is Gold (executive producer)
- 2016: Pride and Prejudice and Zombies (producer)
- 2015: Home Sweet Hell (producer)
- 2013: Jimi: All Is by My Side (producer)
- 2013: Bad Words (producer)
- 2013: Hell Baby (producer)
- 2011: God Bless America (producer)
- 2010: Operation: Endgame (producer)
- 2009: I Hope They Serve Beer in Hell (producer)
- 2009: The Box (producer)
- 2009: World's Greatest Dad (producer)
- 2006: Southland Tales (producer)
