= Donna Gigliotti =

American film producer

- Occupation: Producer
- Years active: 1980–present

Donna Gigliotti is an American film producer. She is best known for producing Shakespeare in Love, Hidden Figures, Silver Linings Playbook, 80 For Brady, and The Reader.

Gigliotti started her professional career as an assistant to Martin Scorsese on the film Raging Bull. During the 1990s Gigliotti worked as an executive-producer on several films including Emma, Talk of Angels and Devil in a Blue Dress.

She is president of the production company Tempesta Films, and has produced movies including The Fundamentals of Caring and Hidden Figures, as well as executive producer of films including Beasts of No Nation. In 2019 she produced the 91st Academy Awards telecast on ABC.

== Filmography ==
She was a producer in all films unless otherwise noted.

=== Film ===
Year	Film	Credit
1995	A Month by the Lake	Executive producer
1995	Devil in a Blue Dress	Associate producer
1995	Restoration	Co-producer
1996	Emma	Executive producer
1998	Talk of Angels	Executive producer
1998	Shakespeare in Love	
2004	Vanity Fair	
2007	The Good Night	
2008	Two Lovers	
2008	The Reader	
2010	Shanghai	
2010	Let Me In	
2011	W.E.	Executive producer
2011	I Don't Know How She Does It	
2012	Silver Linings Playbook	
2014	Big Stone Gap	
2015	Beasts of No Nation	Executive producer
2016	The Fundamentals of Caring	
2016	Hidden Figures	
2022	Nezouh	Executive producer
2023	80 for Brady	
TBA	In the Shadow of the Mountain	

Miscellaneous crew

Year	Film	Role
1980	Raging Bull	Assistant: Martin Scorsese

Thanks

Year	Film	Role
1985	Kiss of the Spider Woman	Acknowledgement
1997	The Wings of the Dove	Special thanks
2001	Gosford Park	The producers wish to thank
2011	Hoodwinked Too! Hood vs. Evil	Special thanks
2011	My Week with Marilyn	Special thanks

=== Television ===
Year	Title	Notes
2019	91st Academy Awards	Television special

== Awards and nominations ==
Academy Awards

- 1998: Best Picture (for Shakespeare in Love, won)
- 2008: Best Picture (for The Reader, nominated)
- 2012: Best Picture (for Silver Linings Playbook, nominated)
- 2016: Best Picture (for Hidden Figures, nominated)

BAFTA Awards

- 1998: Best Film (for Shakespeare in Love, won)
- 2008: Best Film (for The Reader, nominated)

Primetime Emmy Awards

- 2019: Outstanding Variety Special (Live) (for 91st Academy Awards, nominated)

Producers Guild of America (PGA)

- 1998: Motion Picture Producer of the Year Award (for Shakespeare in Love, nominated)
