= Producers Guild of America Milestone Award =

The Producers Guild of America Milestone Award is awarded annually by the Producers Guild of America (PGA) at the Producers Guild Awards ceremonies. It is referred to as the Producers Guild's "most prestigious honor, recognizing an individual or team who has made historic contributions to the entertainment industry."

== Award recipients ==
The following producers have received the award.

- 8th: Terry Semel
- 9th: Bob Daly
- 10th: Steven Spielberg
- 11th: not awarded
- 12th: Kirk Douglas
- 13th: Robert Wise
- 14th: Jack Valenti
- 15th: Warren Beatty
- 16th: Jeffrey Katzenberg
- 17th: Clint Eastwood
- 18th: Ronald Meyer
- 19th: Alan F. Horn
- 20th: Brian Grazer and Ron Howard
- 21st: Michael Lynton and Amy Pascal
- 22nd: James Cameron
- 23rd: Leslie Moonves
- 24th: Harvey Weinstein and Bob Weinstein
- 25th: Bob Iger
- 26th: Jon Feltheimer
- 27th: Jim Gianopulos
- 28th: Tom Rothman
- 29th: Donna Langley
- 30th: Toby Emmerich
- 31st: Ted Sarandos
- 32nd: not awarded
- 33rd: George Lucas and Kathleen Kennedy
- 34th: Michael De Luca and Pamela Abdy
- 35th: Charles D. King
- 36th: Dana Walden
- 37th: Jason Blum
