= Norman Lear Achievement Award in Television =

The Norman Lear Achievement Award in Television is awarded annually by the Producers Guild of America (PGA) at the Producers Guild Awards ceremonies recognizing the individual's outstanding body of work in television. The award category was instituted in 1989 and first awarded at the 1st Producers Guild Awards.

== History ==
The award is named after American television producer Norman Lear. As of the 29th Producer Guild Awards, there have been 31 awards presented.

== Award winners ==
- 1st: David L. Wolper
- 2nd: Grant Tinker
- 3rd: Fred de Cordova
- 4th: Don Hewitt
- 5th: Roy Huggins
- 6th: Leonard Goldenson
- 7th: Ted Turner
- 8th: Edgar Scherick
- 9th: Garry Marshall
- 10th: Ray Stark
- 11th: Aaron Spelling
- 12th: David E. Kelley
- 13th: Tom Werner, Marcy Carsey, and Caryn Mandabach
- 14th: Bud Yorkin
- 15th: Lorne Michaels
- 16th: John Wells
- 17th: Norman Lear
- 18th: Jerry Bruckheimer
- 19th: Dick Wolf
- 20th: David Chase
- 21st: Mark Burnett
- 22nd: Tom Hanks
- 23rd: Don Mischer
- 24th: J. J. Abrams
- 25th: Chuck Lorre
- 26th: Mark Gordon
- 27th: Shonda Rhimes
- 28th: James L. Brooks
- 29th: Ryan Murphy
- 30th: Amy Sherman-Palladino
- 31st: Marta Kauffman
- 32nd: not awarded
- 33rd: Greg Berlanti
- 34th: Mindy Kaling
- 35th: Gail Berman
- 36th: Taika Waititi
- 37th: Mara Brock Akil
