= Primetime Emmy Award for Outstanding Reality Competition Program =

- Awarded for: Outstanding Reality Competition Program
- Country: United States
- Presented by: Academy of Television Arts & Sciences
- First award: 2003
- Currently held by: The Traitors (2026)
- Website: emmys.com

The Primetime Emmy Award for Outstanding Reality Competition Program is handed out for reality-style, skill-based competition formats during the primetime telecast since 2004. The award goes to the producers of the program.

While there was a category for "Outstanding Reality/Competition Program" in 2003, that was for all reality programs, including competition ones.

The Amazing Race won consecutively every year since the category's inception until Top Chef ended its streak in 2010. Likewise, American Idol had been nominated every year since the category's inception, until that streak ended in 2012.

In the following list, the first titles listed are winners, these are also in bold; those not in bold are nominees, which are listed in alphabetical order. The years given are those in which the ceremonies took place:

== Winners and nominations ==
=== 2000s ===
Year	Program	Producers	Network
Outstanding Reality-Competition Program
2004 (56th)
2004 (56th)	**The Amazing Race** **(Season 4)**	**Bertram van Munster, Jerry Bruckheimer and Jonathan Littman, executive producers; Jon Kroll, Amy Nabseth Chacon and Hayma "Screech" Washington, co-executive producers; Anthony Dominici and Rick Ringbakk, supervising producers; Evan Weinstein, senior producer; Brady Connell, Elise Doganieri, Julian Grimmond, Shannon McGinn, Michael Norton, Michael Noval and Bob Parr, producers; Phil Keoghan, host**	**CBS**
2004 (56th)	American Idol (Season 3)	Nigel Lythgoe, Ken Warwick, Cecile Frot-Coutaz and Simon Fuller, executive producers; David Goffin, supervising producer; Charles Boyd, senior producer; Beth McNamara, producer; Ryan Seacrest, host; Simon Cowell, Randy Jackson and Paula Abdul, judges	Fox
2004 (56th)	The Apprentice (Season 1)	Mark Burnett and Donald Trump, executive producers; Jay Bienstock and Conrad Riggs, co-executive producers; Kevin Harris, supervising producer; James Bruce, senior producer; James Bruce, James Canniffe, Seth Cohen, Bill Pruitt and Katherine Walker, producers	NBC
2004 (56th)	Last Comic Standing (Season 1)	Peter Engel and Barry Katz, executive producers; Jay Mohr, executive producer/host; Rob Fox, co-executive producer; Leslie Radakovich, supervising producer; Cori Fry, Brittany Lovett and Javier Winnik, producers	NBC
2004 (56th)	Survivor (Seasons 7–8)	Mark Burnett and Charlie Parsons, executive producers; Craig Armstrong, Tom Shelly and Holly M. Wofford, co-executive producers; Bruce Beresford-Redman and Viki Cacciatore, supervising producers; David Dryden, senior producer; Maria Baltazzi, Adam Briles, Eden Gaha, John Kirhoffer, Doug McCallie, Dan Munday, Cathrine Nilsen and Conrad Riggs, producers; Jeff Probst, producer/host	CBS
2005 (57th)
2005 (57th)	**The Amazing Race** **(Season 7)**	**Bertram van Munster, Jerry Bruckheimer, Jonathan Littman and Hayma "Screech" Washington, executive producers; Amy Nabseth Chacon and Evan Weinstein, co-executive producers; Elise Doganieri, John Moffet, Scott Owens and Mark Vertullo, supervising producers; Alex Rader, Allison Chase, Julian Grimmond, Nancy Gunn and Glenn Stickley, senior producers; Jennifer Basa, David Brown, Patrick Cariaga, Jarratt Carson, Curtis Colden, Al Edgington, Rebekah Fry, Richard Hall, Barry Hennessey, Michael Norton, Michael Noval, Giselle Parets, Bob Parr, Bill Pruitt and Matt Schmidt, producers; Phil Keoghan, host**	**CBS**
2005 (57th)	American Idol (Season 4)	Nigel Lythgoe, Ken Warwick, Cecile Frot-Coutaz and Simon Fuller, executive producers; Charles Boyd, supervising producers; James Breen, senior producer; Megan Michaels and Simon Lythgoe, producers; Ryan Seacrest, host; Simon Cowell, Randy Jackson and Paula Abdul, judges	Fox
2005 (57th)	The Apprentice (Seasons 2–3)	Mark Burnett, Jay Bienstock and Donald Trump, executive producers; Kevin Harris and Conrad Riggs, co-executive producers; James Bruce, senior producer; Matt Bartley, Luciana Brafman Bienstock, James Canniffe, Seth Cohen, Rob LaPlante, Bill Pruitt and Katherine Walker, producers	NBC
2005 (57th)	Project Runway (Season 1)	Harvey Weinstein, Bob Weinstein, Dan Cutforth, Jane Lipsitz, Jane Cha and Desiree Gruber, executive producers; Shari Levine and Frances Berwick, executive producers for Bravo; Heidi Klum, executive producer/host; Rich Bye and Rich Buhrman, co-executive producers; Gaylen Gawlowski, supervising producer; Jennifer Berman, Sebastian Doggart, Eli Holzman, Alexandra Lipsitz and Barbara Schneeweiss, producers	Bravo
2005 (57th)	Survivor (Seasons 9–10)	Mark Burnett, Charlie Parsons and Tom Shelly, executive producers; Vittoria Cacciatore, Kevin Greene, Doug McCallie, Conrad Riggs and Holly M. Wofford, co-executive producers; Dave Burris and Cathrine Nilsen, supervising producers; David Dryden, senior producer; Kate Adler, Maria Baltazzi, Eden Gaha, Jesse Jensen, Teri Kennedy, John Kirhoffer, Dan Munday and David Pritikin, producers; Jeff Probst, producer/host	CBS
2006 (58th)
2006 (58th)	**The Amazing Race** **(Season 9)**	**Bertram van Munster, Jerry Bruckheimer, Jonathan Littman and Hayma "Screech" Washington, executive producers; Elise Doganieri, Amy Nabseth Chacon and Evan Weinstein, co-executive producers; John Moffet, Alex Rader and Mark Vertullo, supervising producers; Allison Chase, Barry Hennessey and David Brown, senior producers; Jennifer Basa, Patrick Cariaga, Bob Mora, Michael Norton, Michael Noval, Cynthia A. Palormo, Giselle Parets, Bob Parr, Bill Pruitt and Matt Schmidt, producers; Phil Keoghan, producer/host**	**CBS**
2006 (58th)	American Idol (Season 5)	Nigel Lythgoe, Ken Warwick, Cecile Frot-Coutaz and Simon Fuller, executive producers; Charles Boyd, supervising producers; James Breen, senior producer; Megan Michaels and Simon Lythgoe, producers; Ryan Seacrest, host; Simon Cowell, Randy Jackson and Paula Abdul, judges	Fox
2006 (58th)	Dancing with the Stars (Seasons 1–2)	Conrad Green and Richard Hopkins, executive producers; Izzie Pick, supervising producer; Rob Wade, senior producer; Matilda Zoltowski, producer; Tom Bergeron and Samantha Harris, hosts; Len Goodman, Bruno Tonioli and Carrie Ann Inaba, judges	ABC
2006 (58th)	Project Runway (Season 2)	Harvey Weinstein, Bob Weinstein, Dan Cutforth, Jane Lipsitz, Rich Bye, Jane Cha, Desiree Gruber, Andy Cohen, Shari Levine and Frances Berwick, executive producers; Heidi Klum, executive producer/host; Rich Buhrman, co-executive producer; Gaylen Gawlowski and Alexandra Lipsitz, supervising producers; Barbara Schneeweiss, Michael Rucker, Ben Mack, Andrew Wallace, Jennifer Berman, Noel Guerra and Steve Lichtenstein, producers	Bravo
2006 (58th)	Survivor (Seasons 11–12)	Mark Burnett, Charlie Parsons and Tom Shelly, executive producers; Kevin Greene, Doug McCallie and Conrad Riggs, co-executive producers; Kate Adler, Ben Beatie, Dave Burris, Teri Kennedy, Cathrine Nilsen and David Pritikin, supervising producers; David Dryden, senior producer; Jesse Jensen, John Kirhoffer and Dan Munday, producers; Jeff Probst, host	CBS
2007 (59th)
2007 (59th)	**The Amazing Race** **(Season 10)**	**Bertram van Munster, Jerry Bruckheimer, Jonathan Littman and Hayma "Screech" Washington, executive producers; Elise Doganieri, Amy Nabseth Chacon and Evan Weinstein, co-executive producers; John Moffet and Mark Vertullo, supervising producers; Allison Chase, Barry Hennessey and Bill Pruitt, senior producers; Bob Parr, Patrick Cariaga, Jarratt Carson, Cris Graves, Jarrod Harlow, Bob Mora, Michael Norton, Michael Noval, Cynthia A. Palormo, Giselle Parets and Matt Schmidt, producers, Phil Keoghan, producer/host**	**CBS**
2007 (59th)	American Idol (Season 6)	Nigel Lythgoe, Ken Warwick, Cecile Frot-Coutaz, Simon Fuller and Richard Curtis, executive producers; Charles Boyd and James Breen, supervising producers; Patrick M. Lynn, senior producer; Megan Michaels, producer; Ryan Seacrest, host; Simon Cowell, Randy Jackson and Paula Abdul, judges	Fox
2007 (59th)	Dancing with the Stars (Seasons 3–4)	Conrad Green and Richard Hopkins, executive producers; Izzie Pick, co-executive producer; Rob Wade and Matilda Zoltowski, supervising producers; Tom Bergeron and Samantha Harris, hosts; Len Goodman, Bruno Tonioli and Carrie Ann Inaba, judges	ABC
2007 (59th)	Project Runway (Season 3)	Harvey Weinstein, Bob Weinstein, Dan Cutforth, Jane Lipsitz, Rich Bye, Jane Cha, Desiree Gruber, Heidi Klum, Andy Cohen, Shari Levine, Rich Buhrman, Frances Berwick and Barbara Schneeweiss, executive producers; Casey Kriley and Alexandra Lipsitz, co-executive producers; Michael Rucker, Ben Mack and Andrew Wallace, producers	Bravo
2007 (59th)	Top Chef (Season 2)	Dan Cutforth, Jane Lipsitz, Shauna Minoprio, Andy Cohen, Frances Berwick and Dave Serwatka, executive producers; Rich Buhrman, co-executive producer; Gaylen Gawlowski, Liz Cook, Scott Shatsky and Steve Lichtenstein, supervising producers; Padma Lakshmi, host; Tom Colicchio and Gail Simmons, co-hosts	Bravo
2008 (60th)
2008 (60th)	**The Amazing Race** **(Season 12)**	**Bertram van Munster, Jerry Bruckheimer, Jonathan Littman and Hayma "Screech" Washington, executive producers; Elise Doganieri and Amy Nabseth Chacon, co-executive producers; Bill Pruitt, Mark Vertullo and Matt Schmidt, supervising producers; Jarratt Carson and Giselle Parets, senior producers; Phil Keoghan, producer**	**CBS**
2008 (60th)	American Idol (Season 7)	Nigel Lythgoe, Ken Warwick, Cecile Frot-Coutaz and Simon Fuller, executive producers; Charles Boyd and James Breen, supervising producers; Patrick M. Lynn and Megan Michaels, senior producers	Fox
2008 (60th)	Dancing with the Stars (Seasons 5–6)	Conrad Green, executive producer; Rob Wade and Matilda Zoltowski, co-executive producers; Michael Brooks, Joe Sungkur and Ashley Edens-Shaffer, supervising producers; Kim Kilbey, Victoria Guinto, Erin O'Brien and Natalee Watts, producer	ABC
2008 (60th)	Project Runway (Season 4)	Harvey Weinstein, Dan Cutforth, Jane Lipsitz, Rich Bye, Jane Cha, Desiree Gruber, Heidi Klum, Andy Cohen and Shari Levine, executive producers; Casey Kriley and Rich Buhrman, co-executive producers; Michael Rucker and Andrew Wallace, supervising producers; Ben Mack, senior producer; Barbara Schneeweiss and Steve Lichtenstein, producers	Bravo
2008 (60th)	Top Chef (Seasons 3–4)	Dan Cutforth, Jane Lipsitz, Shauna Minoprio, Andy Cohen, Frances Berwick and Dave Serwatka, executive producers; Rich Buhrman, co-executive producer; Gaylen Gawlowski, Liz Cook, Scott Shatsky, Nan Strait and Andrew Wallace, supervising producers	Bravo
2009 (61st)
2009 (61st)	**The Amazing Race** **(Seasons 14)**	**Bertram van Munster, Jerry Bruckheimer, Jonathan Littman and Hayma "Screech" Washington, executive producers; Elise Doganieri, Amy Nabseth Chacon and Mark Vertullo, co-executive producers; Matt Schmidt, Jarratt Carson and Evan Weinstein, supervising producers; Giselle Parets, Michael Norton and Patrick Cariaga, senior producers; Phil Keoghan, producer**	**CBS**
2009 (61st)	American Idol (Season 8)	Ken Warwick, Cecile Frot-Coutaz and Simon Fuller, executive producers; Charles Boyd, co-executive producer; Patrick M. Lynn, Megan Michaels and Toby Gorman, supervising producers	Fox
2009 (61st)	Dancing with the Stars (Seasons 7–8)	Conrad Green, executive producer; Rob Wade and Matilda Zoltowski, co-executive producers; Joe Sungkur and Ashley Edens-Shaffer, supervising producers; Kim Kilbey, senior producer; Erin O'Brien, producer	ABC
2009 (61st)	Project Runway (Season 5)	Harvey Weinstein, Bob Weinstein, Dan Cutforth, Jane Lipsitz, Rich Bye, Jane Cha, Desiree Gruber, Heidi Klum, Frances Berwick, Andy Cohen and Shari Levine, executive producers; Casey Kriley, Rich Buhrman, Michael Rucker and Andrew Wallace, co-executive producers; Barbara Schneeweiss, producer	Bravo
2009 (61st)	Top Chef (Season 5)	Dan Cutforth, Jane Lipsitz, Shauna Minoprio, Andy Cohen, Frances Berwick and Dave Serwatka, executive producers; Rich Buhrman, Liz Cook, Fred Pichel, Casey Kriley and Gaylen Gawlowski, co-executive producers; Nan Strait and Kevin Leffler, supervising producers	Bravo

=== 2010s ===
Year	Program	Producers	Network
Outstanding Reality-Competition Program
2010 (62nd)
2010 (62nd)	**Top Chef** **(Season 6)**	**Dan Cutforth, Jane Lipsitz, Liz Cook, Casey Kriley, Andy Cohen and Dave Serwatka, executive producers; Rich Buhrman, Fred Pichel, Gaylen Gawlowski, Tom Colicchio and Nan Strait, co-executive producers; Erica Ross, supervising producer; Julia Cassidy, senior producer**	**Bravo**
2010 (62nd)	The Amazing Race (Seasons 15–16)	Bertram van Munster, Jerry Bruckheimer, Jonathan Littman, Elise Doganieri and Amy Nabseth Chacon, executive producers; Mark Vertullo, Evan Weinstein and Dan Coffie, co-executive producers; Giselle Parets, Barry Hennessey, Matt Schmidt and Jarratt Carson, supervising producers; Michael Norton, Patrick Cariaga and Bob Parr, senior producers; Phil Keoghan, producer	CBS
2010 (62nd)	American Idol (Season 9)	Ken Warwick, Cecile Frot-Coutaz and Simon Fuller, executive producers; Charles Boyd, co-executive producer; Patrick M. Lynn, Megan Michaels and Toby Gorman, supervising producers; Ron DeShay, senior producer; Norm Betts, Sam Brenzel, Melanie Oberman, Katie Fennelly and Theo Dimitriou, producers	Fox
2010 (62nd)	Dancing with the Stars (Seasons 9–10)	Conrad Green, executive producer; Rob Wade, co-executive producer; Joe Sungkur and Ashley Edens-Shaffer, supervising producers; Erin O'Brien, Kim Kilbey, Dan Martin and Deena Katz, senior producers; Tara West, Joshua Firosz, Renana Barkan and Josh Figgs, producers	ABC
2010 (62nd)	Project Runway (Seasons 6–7)	Harvey Weinstein, Bob Weinstein, Jane Cha, Desiree Gruber, Heidi Klum, Jonathan Murray, Sara Rea and Barbara Schneeweiss, executive producers; Colleen Sands and Gil Goldschein, co-executive producers; Sasha Alpert, Megan Bidner and Lisa Fletcher, producers	Lifetime
2011 (63rd)
2011 (63rd)	**The Amazing Race** **(Season 18)**	**Bertram van Munster, Jerry Bruckheimer, Jonathan Littman, Elise Doganieri and Mark Vertullo, executive producers; Evan Weinstein and Dan Coffie, co-executive producers; Giselle Parets, Michael Norton, Barry Hennessey, Matt Schmidt, Patrick Cariaga, Phil Keoghan and Michael Miller, supervising producers; Bob Parr and Neil Jahss, senior producers**	**CBS**
2011 (63rd)	American Idol (Season 10)	Ken Warwick, Cecile Frot-Coutaz, Simon Fuller and Nigel Lythgoe, executive producers; Charles Boyd, co-executive producer; Patrick M. Lynn and Megan Michaels, supervising producers; Ron DeShay and Norm Betts, senior producers; Theodore Dimitriou, Katie Fennelly, Melanie Oberman and Brian Robinson, producers	Fox
2011 (63rd)	Dancing with the Stars (Seasons 11–12)	Conrad Green, executive producer; Joe Sungkur, Ashley Edens-Shaffer and Rob Wade, co-executive producers; Kim Kilbey, supervising producer; Tara West, Deena Katz, Renana Barkan, Dan Martin and Joshua Firosz, senior producers; Josh Figgs, Drew Seltzer and John Birkitt, producers	ABC
2011 (63rd)	Project Runway (Season 8)	Harvey Weinstein, Bob Weinstein, Jane Cha, Desiree Gruber, Heidi Klum, Jonathan Murray, Sara Rea, JoAnn Alfano, David Hillman and Barbara Schneeweiss, executive producers; Colleen Sands and Gil Goldschein, co-executive producers; Lisa Fletcher, supervising producer; Sasha Alpert, Michael Carroll and Trish Norton, producers	Lifetime
2011 (63rd)	So You Think You Can Dance (Season 7)	Barry Adelman, Simon Fuller and Nigel Lythgoe, executive producers; James Breen and Jeff Thacker, co-executive producers; Zoe Brown, supervising producer; Mike Yurchuk and Dan Sacks, senior producers; Adam Cooper, Mike Deffina, Hope Wilson and Brian Robinson, producers	Fox
2011 (63rd)	Top Chef (Seasons 7–8)	Dan Cutforth, Jane Lipsitz, Nan Strait, Casey Kriley, Andy Cohen and Dave Serwatka, executive producers; Andrew Wallace, Chaz Gray, Gaylen Gawlowski and Tom Colicchio, co-executive producers; Erica Ross, Sue Kolinsky and Shea Spencer, supervising producers; Doneen Arquines, Christian Homlish and Jaymee Johnson, senior producers	Bravo
2012 (64th)
2012 (64th)	**The Amazing Race** **(Season 20)**	**Bertram van Munster, Jerry Bruckheimer, Jonathan Littman, Elise Doganieri and Mark Vertullo, executive producers; Dan Coffie, Giselle Parets and Phil Keoghan, co-executive producers; Michael Norton, Matt Schmidt, Patrick Cariaga and Michael Miller, supervising producers; Darren Bunkley, Neil Jahss and Chad Baron, senior producers**	**CBS**
2012 (64th)	Dancing with the Stars (Seasons 13–14)	Conrad Green, executive producer; Joe Sungkur and Ashley Edens-Shaffer, co-executive producers; Kim Kilbey, supervising producer; Tara West, Deena Katz, Renana Barkan, Dan Martin and Joshua Firosz, senior producers; John Birkitt, Marcy Walton and Jonty Nash, producers	ABC
2012 (64th)	Project Runway (Season 9)	Harvey Weinstein, Bob Weinstein, Meryl Poster, Jane Cha, Desiree Gruber, Heidi Klum, Jonathan Murray, Sara Rea, Gena McCarthy, Rob Sharenow, David Hillman and Barbara Schneeweiss, executive producers; Colleen Sands and Gil Goldschein, co-executive producers; Lisa Fletcher, supervising producer; Tim Gunn, producer	Lifetime
2012 (64th)	So You Think You Can Dance (Season 8)	Barry Adelman, Simon Fuller and Nigel Lythgoe, executive producers; James Breen and Jeff Thacker, co-executive producers; Zoe Brown, senior supervising producer; Mike Yurchuk and Dan Sacks, co-supervising producers; Adam Cooper, Mike Deffina, Hope Wilson and Colleen Wagner, senior producers	Fox
2012 (64th)	Top Chef (Season 9)	Dan Cutforth, Jane Lipsitz, Nan Strait, Casey Kriley, Andy Cohen and Dave Serwatka, executive producers; Erica Ross, Sue Kolinsky and Tom Colicchio, co-executive producers; Doneen Arquines, Christian Homlish, Wade Sheeler and Kevin Kearney, supervising producers; Chris Gallivan, senior producer	Bravo
2012 (64th)	The Voice (Season 2)	John de Mol Jr., Mark Burnett, Audrey Morrissey, Stijn Bakkers and Lee Metzger, executive producers; Chad Hines, Jim Roush and Amanda Zucker, co-executive producers; Nicolle Yaron, Mike Yurchuk and Dean Houser, supervising producers; Joni Day, Teddy Valenti, May Johnson, David Offenheiser and Carson Daly, producers	NBC
2013 (65th)
2013 (65th)	**The Voice** **(Seasons 3–4)**	**John de Mol Jr., Mark Burnett, Audrey Morrissey, Stijn Bakkers and Lee Metzger, executive producers; Chad Hines, Jim Roush and Amanda Zucker, co-executive producers; Nicolle Yaron and Mike Yurchuk, senior supervising producers; Kyra Thompson, supervising producer; Teddy Valenti, senior producer; May Johnson, Carson Daly, Ashley Baumann and Keith Dinielli; producers**	**NBC**
2013 (65th)	The Amazing Race (Seasons 21–22)	Bertram van Munster, Jerry Bruckheimer, Jonathan Littman, Elise Doganieri and Mark Vertullo, executive producers; Patrick Cariaga, Dan Coffie, Giselle Parets, Matt Schmidt and Phil Keoghan, co-executive producers; Darren Bunkley, Michael Norton, Michael Miller, Michael Dimaggio and Neil Jahss, supervising producers; Vanessa Abugho Ballesteros, senior producer	CBS
2013 (65th)	Dancing with the Stars (Seasons 15–16)	Conrad Green, executive producer; Joe Sungkur and Ashley Edens-Shaffer, co-executive producers; Tara West, Deena Katz, Dan Martin and Jonty Nash, senior producers; Marcy Walton, Peter Hebri and Ashley Shea Landers, producers	ABC
2013 (65th)	Project Runway (Seasons 10–11)	Harvey Weinstein, Bob Weinstein, Meryl Poster, Jane Cha, Desiree Gruber, Heidi Klum, Jonathan Murray, Sara Rea, Gena McCarthy, Rob Sharenow, David Hillman, Barbara Schneeweiss and Colleen Sands, executive producers; Gil Goldschein, co-executive producer; Teri Weideman, supervising producer; Tim Gunn, producer	Lifetime
2013 (65th)	So You Think You Can Dance (Season 9)	Barry Adelman, Simon Fuller and Nigel Lythgoe, executive producers; James Breen and Jeff Thacker, co-executive producers; Zoe Brown and Dan Sacks, senior supervising producer; Adam Cooper, supervising producer; Mike Deffina and Hope Wilson, senior producers; Matt Kinsey and Jensen Moon, producers	Fox
2013 (65th)	Top Chef (Season 10)	Dan Cutforth, Jane Lipsitz, Nan Strait, Casey Kriley, Andy Cohen, Dave Serwatka, Andrew Wallace, Tom Colicchio and Matthew Reichman, executive producers; Erica Ross, co-executive producer; Doneen Arquines, Christian Homlish, Wade Sheeler, Meri Haitkin and Tara Siener, supervising producers; Blake Davis, senior producer	Bravo
2014 (66th)
2014 (66th)	**The Amazing Race** **(Season 23)**	**Bertram van Munster, Jerry Bruckheimer, Jonathan Littman, Elise Doganieri and Mark Vertullo, executive producers; Patrick Cariaga, Dan Coffie, Giselle Parets, Matt Schmidt and Phil Keoghan, co-executive producers; Darren Bunkley, Michael Norton, Michael Dimaggio and Neil Jahss, supervising producers; Chad Baron and Vanessa Abugho Ballesteros, senior producers**	**CBS**
2014 (66th)	Dancing with the Stars (Seasons 17–18)	Conrad Green, Joe Sungkur and Ashley Edens-Shaffer, executive producer; Tara West, Deena Katz and Dan Martin, supervising producers; Peter Hebri, Ryan Goble and Ashley Shea Landers, senior producers; Megan Wade and Chad Harrison, producers	ABC
2014 (66th)	Project Runway (Season 12)	Harvey Weinstein, Bob Weinstein, Meryl Poster, Jonathan Murray, Sara Rea, Heidi Klum, Jane Cha, Desiree Gruber, Rob Sharenow, Gena McCarthy, David Hillman and Barbara Schneeweiss, executive producers; Gil Goldschein and Teri Weideman, co-executive producers; Rebecca Taylor Henning, senior producer; Tim Gunn and Sasha Alpert, producers	Lifetime
2014 (66th)	So You Think You Can Dance (Season 10)	Barry Adelman, Simon Fuller, Allen Shapiro and Nigel Lythgoe, executive producers; James Breen and Jeff Thacker, co-executive producers; Zoe Brown and Dan Sacks, senior supervising producer; Adam Cooper, supervising producer; Mike Deffina and Colleen Wagner, senior producers; Matt Kinsey and Jensen Moon, producers	Fox
2014 (66th)	Top Chef (Season 11)	Dan Cutforth, Jane Lipsitz, Casey Kriley, Hillary Olsen, Tara Siener, Tom Colicchio and Padma Lakshmi, executive producers; Erica Ross, Doneen Arquines and Shealan Spencer, co-executive producers; Christian Homlish, Wade Sheeler and Blake Davis, supervising producers; Ivan Oyco, senior producer	Bravo
2014 (66th)	The Voice (Seasons 5–6)	John de Mol Jr., Mark Burnett, Audrey Morrissey, Stijn Bakkers and Lee Metzger, executive producers; Chad Hines, Jim Roush, Amanda Zucker, Nicolle Yaron and Mike Yurchuk, co-executive producers; Kyra Thompson, supervising producer; Teddy Valenti and May Johnson, senior producers; Carson Daly, Ashley Baumann, Keith Dinielli, Barton Kimball, Kyley Tucker and Brittany Martin; producers	NBC
2015 (67th)
2015 (67th)	**The Voice** **(Seasons 7–8)**	**John de Mol Jr., Mark Burnett, Audrey Morrissey, Stijn Bakkers and Lee Metzger, executive producers; Chad Hines, Jim Roush, Amanda Zucker, Mike Yurchuk and Kyra Thompson, co-executive producers; Teddy Valenti, May Johnson, Anthea Bhargava and Clyde Lieberman, supervising producers; Ashley Baumann and Keith Dinielli, senior producers; Carson Daly, Barton Kimball, Kyley Tucker, Brittany Martin and Michelle McNulty; producers**	**NBC**
2015 (67th)	The Amazing Race (Seasons 25–26)	Bertram van Munster, Jerry Bruckheimer, Jonathan Littman, Elise Doganieri and Mark Vertullo, executive producers; Patrick Cariaga, Dan Coffie, Giselle Parets, Matt Schmidt and Phil Keoghan, co-executive producers; Darren Bunkley, Michael Norton, Michael Dimaggio and Neil Jahss, supervising producers; Chad Baron, senior producer	CBS
2015 (67th)	Dancing with the Stars (Seasons 19–20)	Conrad Green, Joe Sungkur and Ashley Edens-Shaffer, executive producer; Deena Katz and Angela Castro, co-executive producers; Tara West, Dan Martin and Stacey Thomas-Muir, supervising producers; Peter Hebri and Ashley Shea Landers, senior producers; Megan Wade and Shelby Wagner, producers	ABC
2015 (67th)	Project Runway (Season 13)	Harvey Weinstein, Bob Weinstein, Meryl Poster, Jonathan Murray, Sara Rea, Heidi Klum, Jane Cha, Desiree Gruber, David Hillman, Barbara Schneeweiss, Mary Donahue and Eli Lehrer, executive producers; Gil Goldschein and Teri Weideman, co-executive producers; Sue Kinkead and Cosmo De Ceglie, supervising producers; Tim Gunn and Sasha Alpert, producers	Lifetime
2015 (67th)	So You Think You Can Dance (Season 11)	Barry Adelman, Simon Fuller, Allen Shapiro, Nigel Lythgoe, James Breen and Jeff Thacker, executive producers; Zoe Brown, co-executive producer; Mike Deffina and Colleen Wagner, supervising producers; Jensen Moon and Melanie Oberman, senior producers	Fox
2015 (67th)	Top Chef (Season 12)	Dan Cutforth, Jane Lipsitz, Chaz Gray, Casey Kriley, Doneen Arquines, Tom Colicchio and Padma Lakshmi, executive producers; Erica Ross, co-executive producer; Blake Davis, Justin Rae Barnes and Azon Juan, supervising producers; Chris Gallivan, senior producer	Bravo
2016 (68th)
2016 (68th)	**The Voice** **(Seasons 9–10)**	**John de Mol Jr., Mark Burnett, Audrey Morrissey, Jay Bienstock, Lee Metzger and Chad Hines, executive producers; Amanda Zucker, Mike Yurchuk and Kyra Thompson, co-executive producers; Teddy Valenti, Anthea Bhargava, Keith Dinielli, May Johnson and Clyde Lieberman, supervising producers; Ashley Baumann and Kyley Tucker, senior producers; Carson Daly, Barton Kimball, Brittany Martin and Michelle McNulty; producers**	**NBC**
2016 (68th)	The Amazing Race (Seasons 27–28)	Bertram van Munster, Jerry Bruckheimer, Jonathan Littman, Elise Doganieri and Mark Vertullo, executive producers; Patrick Cariaga, Dan Coffie, Matt Schmidt and Phil Keoghan, co-executive producers; Darren Bunkley, Michael Dimaggio and Neil Jahss, supervising producers; Chad Baron and Ady Ryf, senior producers	CBS
2016 (68th)	American Ninja Warrior (Season 7)	Arthur Smith, Kent Weed, Anthony Storm and Brian Richardson, executive producers; Kristen Stabile, co-executive producer; Royce Toni, J.D. Pruess, David Markus, John Gunn, D. Max Poris, Matt Silverberg, Briana Vowels, Mason Funk, supervising producers	NBC
2016 (68th)	Dancing with the Stars (Seasons 21–22)	Rob Wade, Joe Sungkur and Ashley Edens-Shaffer, executive producer; Deena Katz, Dan Martin and Angela Castro, co-executive producers; Tara West and Stacey Thomas-Muir, supervising producers; Peter Hebri, senior producer; Megan Wade, Shelby Wagner, Chelsea Low and Yasmin Rawji, producers	ABC
2016 (68th)	Project Runway (Season 14)	Harvey Weinstein, Bob Weinstein, Jonathan Murray, Sara Rea, Heidi Klum, Jane Cha, Desiree Gruber, Eli Lehrer, Mary Donahue, David Hillman, Patrick Reardon and Barbara Schneeweiss, executive producers; Gil Goldschein and Teri Weideman, co-executive producers; Sue Kinkead and Cosmo De Ceglie, supervising producers; Tim Gunn and Sasha Alpert, producers	Lifetime
2016 (68th)	Top Chef (Season 13)	Dan Cutforth, Jane Lipsitz, Casey Kriley, Doneen Arquines, Tara Steiner, Tom Colicchio and Padma Lakshmi, executive producers; Erica Ross, Patrick Schmedeman and Wade Sheeler, co-executive producers; Ellie Carbajal, Blake Davis, Justin Rae Barnes and Daniel Calin, supervising producers; Shannon Callaghan, senior producer	Bravo
2017 (69th)
2017 (69th)	**The Voice** **(Seasons 11–12)**	**John de Mol Jr., Mark Burnett, Audrey Morrissey, Jay Bienstock, Lee Metzger and Chad Hines, executive producers; Amanda Zucker, Mike Yurchuk and Kyra Thompson, co-executive producers; Teddy Valenti, Anthea Bhargava, Keith Dinielli, May Johnson and Clyde Lieberman, supervising producers; Ashley Baumann-Sylvester, Barton Kimball, Brittany Martin Porter and Kyley Tucker, senior producers; Amanda Silva Borden, Carson Daly and Dan Paschen; producers**	**NBC**
2017 (69th)	The Amazing Race (Season 29)	Bertram van Munster, Elise Doganieri, Jerry Bruckheimer, Jonathan Littman and Mark Vertullo, executive producers; Matt Schmidt, Patrick Cariaga and Phil Keoghan, co-executive producers; Darren Bunkley, Michael Dimaggio, Neil Jahss and Ady Ryf, supervising producers; Sydney Leier, Eric Roby, Sarah Stallard and Jack Walworth, senior producers	CBS
2017 (69th)	American Ninja Warrior (Season 8)	Arthur Smith, Kent Weed, Anthony Storm and Brian Richardson, executive producers; Kristen Stabile, co-executive producer; Briana Vowels, D. Max Poris, David Markus, J.D. Pruess, Jonathan Provost, Royce Toni and Zayna Abi-Hashim, supervising producers	NBC
2017 (69th)	Project Runway (Season 15)	Harvey Weinstein, Bob Weinstein, Jonathan Murray, Sara Rea, Colleen Sands, Heidi Klum, Jane Cha, Desiree Gruber, Mary Donahue, David Hillman, Patrick Reardon and Barbara Schneeweiss, executive producers; Gil Goldschein and Teri Weideman, co-executive producers; Sue Kinkead, Cosmo De Ceglie, Glenn Morgan and Blue Benenati, supervising producers; Tim Gunn, producer	Lifetime
2017 (69th)	RuPaul's Drag Race (Season 9)	Fenton Bailey, Randy Barbato, Tom Campbell, RuPaul Charles, Mandy Salangsang and Steven Corfe, executive producers; Michele Mills and Jacqueline Wilson, co-executive producers	VH1
2017 (69th)	Top Chef (Season 14)	Dan Cutforth, Jane Lipsitz, Doneen Arquines, Casey Kriley, Gaylen Gawlowski, Tom Colicchio and Padma Lakshmi, executive producers; Erica Ross, Blake Davis and Scott Patch, co-executive producers; Ellie Carbajal Araiza and Daniel Calin, supervising producers; Zoe Jackson, senior producer	Bravo
2018 (70th)
2018 (70th)	**RuPaul's Drag Race** **(Season 10)**	**Pamela Post, Tim Palazzola, Fenton Bailey, Randy Barbato, Tom Campbell, RuPaul Charles, Mandy Salangsang and Steven Corfe, executive producers; Bruce McCoy, Michele Mills and Jacqueline Wilson, co-executive producers; Thairin Smothers, senior producer**	**VH1**
2018 (70th)	The Amazing Race (Season 30)	Bertram van Munster, Elise Doganieri, Jerry Bruckheimer, Jonathan Littman and Mark Vertullo, executive producers; Matt Schmidt, Patrick Cariaga, Phil Keoghan and Darren Bunkley, co-executive producers; Michael DiMaggio and Neil Jahss, supervising producers; Jesse McDonald, Sarah Stallard and Jack Walworth, senior producers	CBS
2018 (70th)	American Ninja Warrior (Season 9)	Arthur Smith, Kent Weed, Anthony Storm and Brian Richardson, executive producers; Kristen Stabile and David Markus, co-executive producers; Briana Vowels, D. Max Poris, J.D. Pruess, Jonathan Provost, Royce Toni, Jeffrey Hyman and Stephen Saylor, supervising producers	NBC
2018 (70th)	Project Runway (Season 16)	Jonathan Murray, Sara Rea, Heidi Klum, Jane Cha, Desiree Gruber, David Hillman, Patrick Reardon and Barbara Schneeweiss, executive producers; Gil Goldschein and Teri Weideman, co-executive producers; Sue Kinkead, Cosmo De Ceglie, Glenn Morgan, Blue Benenati and Tyler O'Neil, supervising producers; Tim Gunn and Courtney Doyle, producer	Lifetime
2018 (70th)	Top Chef (Season 15)	Dan Cutforth, Jane Lipsitz, Doneen Arquines, Casey Kriley, Tara Siener, Tom Colicchio and Padma Lakshmi, executive producers; Justin Rae Barnes, Blake Davis, Patrick Schmedeman and Wade Sheeler, co-executive producers; Ellie Carbajal Araiza and Zoe Jackson, supervising producers; Brian Fowler and Steve Lichtenstein, senior producers; Diana Schmedeman, producer	Bravo
2018 (70th)	The Voice (Seasons 13–14)	John de Mol Jr., Mark Burnett, Audrey Morrissey, Stijn Bakkers, Chad Hines, Amanda Zucker, Kyra Thompson and Lee Metzger, executive producers; Teddy Valenti, co-executive producer; Anthea Bhargava, Clyde Lieberman, Keith Dinielli, Kyley Tucker and Valentina May Johnson, supervising producers; Ashley Baumann-Sylvester, Barton Kimball and Brittany Martin Porter, senior producers; Amanda Silva Borden, Carson Daly, Dan Paschen, Tod Schellinger and Jared Wyso, producers	NBC
Outstanding Competition Program
2019 (71st)
2019 (71st)	**RuPaul's Drag Race** **(Season 11)**	**Pamela Post, Tim Palazzola, Randy Barbato, Fenton Bailey, Tom Campbell, RuPaul Charles, Steven Corfe and Mandy Salangsang, executive producers; Bruce McCoy, Michele Mills and Jacqueline Wilson, co-executive producers; Thairin Smothers, senior producer; John Polly, Michelle Visage and Jen Passovoy, producers**	**VH1**
2019 (71st)	The Amazing Race (Season 31)	Jerry Bruckheimer, Bertram van Munster, Jonathan Littman, Elise Doganieri, Mark Vertullo and Phil Keoghan, executive producers; Patrick Cariaga, Matt Schmidt and Darren Bunkley, co-executive producers; Mike DiMaggio, Neil Jahss, Michael Norton and Ady Ryf, supervising producers; Steve Bae, Sydney Leier and Sarah Stallard, senior producers	CBS
2019 (71st)	American Ninja Warrior (Season 10)	Arthur Smith, Kent Weed, Anthony Storm and Brian Richardson, executive producers; Kristen Stabile and David Markus, co-executive producers; D. Max Poris, David Brackenhoff, Greg Cruser, Kate Griendling, Jonathan Provost, J.D. Pruess, Royce Toni and Briana Vowels, supervising producers	NBC
2019 (71st)	Nailed It! (Seasons 2–3 & Holiday!)	Dan Cutforth, Jane Lipsitz, Daniel Calin, Gaylen Gawlowski, Casey Kriley and Patrick J. Doody, executive producers; Jo Sharon, co-executive producer; Laura Slobin, supervising producer	Netflix
2019 (71st)	Top Chef (Season 16)	Dan Cutforth, Jane Lipsitz, Doneen Arquines, Casey Kriley, Tara Siener, Tom Colicchio and Padma Lakshmi, executive producers; Justin Rae Barnes, Blake Davis, Patrick Schmedeman and Wade Sheeler, co-executive producers; Elida Carbajal Araiza, Brian Fowler, Caitlin Rademaekers and Emily Van Bergen, supervising producers; Steve Lichtenstein, senior producer	Bravo
2019 (71st)	The Voice (Seasons 15–16)	John de Mol, Mark Burnett, Audrey Morrissey, Stijn Bakkers, Amanda Zucker and Kyra Thompson, executive producers; Teddy Valenti and Kyley Tucker, co-executive producers; Anthea Bhargava, Melysa Lovell Garratt, Clyde Lieberman, Brittany Martin Porter and Barton Kimball, supervising producers; Dan Paschen and Amanda Silva Borden, senior producers; Tod Schellinger, Carson Daly, Jared Wyso and Hayley Opalek McSherry, producers	NBC

=== 2020s ===
Year	Program	Producers	Network
Outstanding Competition Program
2020 (72nd)
2020 (72nd)	**RuPaul's Drag Race** **(Season 12)**	**Tim Palazzola, Randy Barbato, Fenton Bailey, Tom Campbell, RuPaul Charles, Steven Corfe and Mandy Salangsang, executive producers; Michelle Mills and Jacqueline Wilson, co-executive produces; Lisa Steele and Adam Bronstein, supervising producers; Thairin Smothers, senior producer; John Polly, Michelle Visage, Jen Passovoy and Alicia Gargaro-Magana, producers**	**VH1**
2020 (72nd)	The Masked Singer (Seasons 2–3)	Craig Plestis, Izzie Pick-Ibarra, Rosie Seitchik and Nick Cannon, executive producers; Patrizia Di Maria, Chris Wagner, Deena Katz, Lindsay Tuggle, Brian Updyke and Ashley Baumann-Sylvester, co-executive producers; Jeff Kmiotek, senior supervising producer; Peter Hebri, Erin Brady, Kristin Campbell-Taylor and Tiana Gandelman, supervising producers; Lindsay John, Mike Riccio, Zoë Ritchken and Lexi Shoemaker, senior producers	Fox
2020 (72nd)	Nailed It! (Season 4 & Holiday!)	Patrick J. Doody, Gaylen Gawlowski and Casey Kriley, executive producers; Jo Sharon and Sandra Birdsong, co-executive producers; Anika Guldstrand and Cat Sullivan, supervising producers	Netflix
2020 (72nd)	Top Chef (Season 17)	Doneen Arquines, Casey Kriley, Tara Siener, Tom Colicchio and Padma Lakshmi, executive producers; Elida Carbajal Araiza, Hunter Braun, Brian Fowler, Thi Nguyen, Hillary Olsen, Patrick Schmedeman and Wade Sheeler, co-executive producers; Rich Brusa, Scott Patch and Eric Vier, supervising producers; Nora Cromwell and Steve Lichtenstein, senior producers; Diana Schmedeman, producer	Bravo
2020 (72nd)	The Voice (Seasons 17–18)	John de Mol, Mark Burnett, Audrey Morrissey, Stijn Bakkers, Amanda Zucker and Kyra Thompson, executive producers; Teddy Valenti and Kyley Tucker, co-executive producers; Anthea Bhargava, Melysa Lovell Garratt, Clyde Lieberman, Brittany Martin Porter and Barton Kimball, supervising producers; Dan Paschen and Amanda Silva Borden, senior producers; Tod Schellinger, Carson Daly, Jared Wyso and Hayley Opalek McSherry, producers	NBC
2021 (73rd)
2021 (73rd)	**RuPaul's Drag Race** **(Season 13)**	**Fenton Bailey, Randy Barbato, Tom Campbell, RuPaul Charles, Steven Corfe, Mandy Salangsang, Michele Mills and Tim Palazzola, executive producers; Thairin Smothers, senior producer; John Polly, Zoe Jackson, Lisa Steele and Camilo Valdes, co-executive producers; Michelle Visage and Alicia Gargaro-Magana, producers; Jen Passovoy, supervising producer**	**VH1**
2021 (73rd)	The Amazing Race (Season 32)	Jerry Bruckheimer, Bertram van Munster, Jonathan Littman, Elise Doganieri, Mark Vertullo and Phil Keoghan, executive producers; Matt Schmidt, Patrick Cariaga and Darren Bunkley, co-executive producers; Micheal DiMaggio, Neil Jahss, Sydney Leier, Jesse McDonald and Ady Ryf, supervising producers; Steve Bae, Sarah Stallard and Eddie Garrick, senior producers	CBS
2021 (73rd)	Nailed It! (Season 5)	Casey Kriley, Jo Sharon, Patrick Doody, Shea Spencer and Nicole Byer, executive producers; Anika Guldstrand, Hillary Olsen and Cat M. Sullivan, co-executive producers; Samantha Hanks, senior producer	Netflix
2021 (73rd)	Top Chef (Season 18)	Casey Kriley, Jo Sharon, Doneen Arquines, Tom Colicchio and Padma Lakshmi, executive producers; Elida Carbajal Araiza, Hunter Braun, Thi Nguyen, Hillary Olsen, Patrick Schmedeman, Wade Sheeler and Tracy Tong, co-executive producers; Sandee Birdsong, Rich Brusa, Nora Cromwell and Eric Vier, supervising producers; Steve Lichtenstein, senior producer; Diana Schmedeman, producer	Bravo
2021 (73rd)	The Voice (Seasons 19–20)	John de Mol, Mark Burnett, Audrey Morrissey, Adam Sher, Amanda Zucker and Kyra Thompson, executive producers; Teddy Valenti and Kyley Tucker, co-executive producers; Anthea Bhargava, Melysa Garratt, Clyde Lieberman, Brittany Martin Porter and Bart Kimball, supervising producers; Dan Paschen and Amanda Silva Borden, senior producers; Tod Schellinger, Carson Daly, Jared Wyso and Hayley Opalek McSherry, producers	NBC
2022 (74th)
2022 (74th)	**Lizzo's Watch Out for the Big Grrrls** **(Season 1)**	**Lizzo, Makiah Green, Kevin Beisler, Julie Pizzi, Farnaz Farjam, Myiea Coy, Kimberly Goodman and Glenda N. Cox, executive producers; Alana Balden, co-executive producer; Marco Franzitta, supervising producer; Brittany Matthews and Chelsea Bray, supervising story producers**	**Prime Video**
2022 (74th)	The Amazing Race (Season 33)	Jerry Bruckheimer, Bertram van Munster, Jonathan Littman, Elise Doganieri, Mark Vertullo and Phil Keoghan, executive producers; Patrick Cariaga, Matt Schmidt and Darren Bunkley, co-executive producers; Mike Miller and Sarah Stallard, supervising producers; Krista Fukunaga, senior producer	CBS
2022 (74th)	Nailed It! (Season 6)	Casey Kriley, Jo Sharon, Patrick Doody, Shea Spencer and Nicole Byer, executive producers; Anika Guldstrand, Hillary Olsen and Cat M. Sullivan, co-executive producers; Jessica Guerra, supervising story producer	Netflix
2022 (74th)	RuPaul's Drag Race (Season 14)	RuPaul Charles, Fenton Bailey, Randy Barbato, Tom Campbell, Mandy Salangsang, Steven Corfe, Michele Mills and Tim Palazzola, executive producers; John Polly, Thairin Smothers, Lisa Steele and Camilo Valdes, co-executive producers; Sara Kordy, Jeremy McGovern and Jen Passovoy, supervising producers; Michael Seligman and Michelle Visage, senior producers; Alicia Gargaro-Magana, producer	VH1
2022 (74th)	Top Chef (Season 19)	Casey Kriley, Jo Sharon, Doneen Arquines, Gaylen Gawlowski, Padma Lakshmi and Tom Colicchio, executive producers; Hunter Braun, Nora Cromwell, Thi Nguyen and Hillary Olsen, co-executive producers; Diana E. Gonzales, supervising producer; Steve Lichtenstein, senior producer; Joon Hee Lim, Maureen Biegas, Jessica Guerra, Jillian Mireles, Catherine Pasciak and Zach Roberts, supervising story producers	Bravo
2022 (74th)	The Voice (Season 21)	John de Mol, Mark Burnett, Audrey Morrissey, Amanda Zucker and Kyra Thompson, executive producers; Teddy Valenti, Kyley Tucker and Brittany Martin Porter, co-executive producers; Anthea Bhargava, Melysa Lovell Garratt, Barton Kimball and Clyde Lieberman, supervising producers; Dan Paschen, senior producer; Tod Schellinger, Jared Wyso, Carson Daly, Meredith Ambrose and Hayley Opalek McSherry, producers	NBC
Outstanding Reality Competition Program
2023 (75th)
2023 (75th)	**RuPaul's Drag Race** **(Season 15)**	**RuPaul Charles, Fenton Bailey, Randy Barbato, Tom Campbell, Mandy Salangsang, Steven Corfe, Michelle Mills and Tim Palazzola, executive producers; John Polly, Thairin Smothers and Lisa Steele, co-executive producers; Sara Kordy, Jen Passovoy and Jeremy McGovern, supervising producers; Michelle Visage, Ashlei Dabney and Michael Seligman, senior producers; Alicia Gargaro-Magaña, Carson Kressley and Ross Mathews, producers**	**MTV**
2023 (75th)	The Amazing Race (Season 34)	Jerry Bruckheimer, Bertram van Munster, Jonathan Littman, Elise Doganieri, Mark Vertullo, Phil Keoghan and Patrick Cariaga, executive producers; Matt Schmidt, Darren Bunkley, Micheal DiMaggio and Chad Baron, co-executive producers; Krista Fukunaga and Eva Grimmer-Comden, senior producers	CBS
2023 (75th)	Survivor (Seasons 43–44)	Jeff Probst and Matt Van Wagenen, executive producers; Ryan Balthazor, Clark Bernstein, Dawn Haber, Joe Lia and Hudson H. Smith III, co-executive producers	CBS
2023 (75th)	Top Chef (Season 20)	Casey Kriley, Jo Sharon, Doneen Arquines, Hillary Olsen, Tracy Tong, Tom Colicchio and Padma Lakshmi, executive producers; Hunter Braun, Nora Cromwell, Thi Nguyen, Patrick Schmedeman and Eric Vier, co-executive producers; Frank Crane and Diana E. Gonzales, supervising producers; Diana Schmedeman, producer; Steve Lichtenstein, senior producer; Joon Hee Lim, Jillian Diaz Mireles, Tessa Saville, Maureen Biegas, Jessica Guerra and Caitlin Henley, supervising story producers	Bravo
2023 (75th)	The Voice (Seasons 22–23)	John De Mol, Mark Burnett, Audrey Morrissey, Amanda Zucker and Kyra Thompson, executive producers; Teddy Valenti, Barton Kimball and Brittany Martin Porter, co-executive producers; Amanda Silva Borden, Clyde Lieberman and Dan Paschen, supervising producers; Kyle Grossinger, Hayley Opalek McSherry and Jared Wyso, senior producers; Meredith Ambrose and Carson Daly, producers	NBC
2024 (76th)
2024 (76th)	**The Traitors** **(Season 2)**	**Mike Cotton, Toni Ireland, Sam Rees-Jones, Stephen Lambert, Jack Burgess and Tim Harcourt, executive producers; Ben Cook, Joe Evans, Laura Gallen, Chris Mannion, Emma Carroll and Deena Katz, co-executive producers; Zoe Duerden, supervising producer; Alan Cumming, producer**	**Peacock**
2024 (76th)	The Amazing Race (Seasons 35–36)	Jerry Bruckheimer, Bertram van Munster, Jonathan Littman, Elise Doganieri, Mark Vertullo, Phil Keoghan and Patrick Cariaga, executive producers; Matt Schmidt, Darren Bunkley, Micheal DiMaggio, Chad Baron and JR Meyer, co-executive producers	CBS
2024 (76th)	RuPaul's Drag Race (Season 16)	Fenton Bailey, Randy Barbato, Tom Campbell, RuPaul Charles, Mandy Salangsang, Steven Corfe, Michele Mills and Daniel Blau Rogge, executive producers; John Polly, Thairin Smothers and Lisa Steele, co-executive producers; Sara Kordy and Julie Ha, supervising producers; Michelle Visage, Thea Berns and Michael Seligman, senior producers; Alicia Gargaro-Magana, Carson Kressley and Ross Mathews, producers	MTV
2024 (76th)	Top Chef (Season 21)	Casey Kriley, Jo Sharon, Doneen Arquines, Hillary Olsen, Tracy Tong, Tom Colicchio and Gail Simmons, executive producers; Hunter Braun, Nora Cromwell, Thi Nguyen and Patrick Schmedeman, co-executive producers; John Adams and Taylor Cochran, supervising producers; Diana Schmedeman, producer; Steve Lichtenstein, senior producer; Blair Baskin, Jessica Guerra, Timothy Hayward, Caitlin Henley, Joon Hee Lim and Jillian Diaz Mireles, supervising story producers	Bravo
2024 (76th)	The Voice (Seasons 24–25)	John De Mol, Mark Burnett, Audrey Morrissey, Amanda Zucker and Kyra Thompson, executive producers; Teddy Valenti, Barton Kimball, Brittany Martin Porter, Clyde Lieberman and Amanda Silva Borden, co-executive producers; Dan Paschen and Kyle Grossinger, supervising producers; Hayley Opalek McSherry, Melissa Wong, Jared Wyso and Meredith Ambrose, senior producers; Carson Daly, Ashley Bennett and Gavin Lee Rees, producers	NBC
2025 (77th)
2025 (77th)	**The Traitors** **(Season 3)**	**Mike Cotton, Sam Rees-Jones, Rosie Franks, Stephen Lambert, Jack Burgess and Tim Harcourt, executive producers; Emma Carroll, Zoe Duerden, Laura Gallen, Deena Katz, Chris Mannion and Claire O'Shea, co-executive producers; Alan Cumming, producer**	**Peacock**
2025 (77th)	The Amazing Race (Season 37)	Jerry Bruckheimer, Bertram van Munster, Jonathan Littman, Elise Doganieri, Mark Vertullo, Phil Keoghan and Patrick Cariaga, executive producers; Matt Schmidt, Darren Bunkley, Mike DiMaggio, Chad Baron, JR Meyer and Bob Mora, co-executive producers	CBS
2025 (77th)	RuPaul's Drag Race (Season 17)	Fenton Bailey, Randy Barbato, Tom Campbell, RuPaul Charles, Mandy Salangsang, Steven Corfe, Michele Mills and Daniel Blau Rogge, executive producers; Sara Kordy, John Polly, Thairin Smothers, Lisa Steele and Michelle Visage, co-executive producers; Michael Seligman and Julie Ha, supervising producers; Alicia Gargaro-Magana, Carson Kressley and Ross Mathews, producers; Thea Berns and Ashlei Dabney, senior producers	MTV
2025 (77th)	Survivor (Seasons 47–48)	Mark Burnett, Jeff Probst, Matt Van Wagenen, Jesse Jensen and Kahaia Pearson, executive producers; Ryan Balthazor, Brittany Crapper, David Dale Dryden, Dawn Haber, John B. Kirhoffer, Joe Lia, Jimmy Quigley and Hudson H. Smith III, co-executive producers; Christopher Marchand, Zachariah Jensen, Simon "Simo" Ross and Zach Sundelius, supervising producers; Andrea Joynt, producer	CBS
2025 (77th)	Top Chef (Season 22)	Casey Kriley, Jo Sharon, Doneen Arquines, Tracy Tong, Tom Colicchio and Gail Simmons, executive producers; Hunter Braun, Nora Cromwell, Thi Nguyen, Patrick Schmedeman and Eric Vier, co-executive producers; John Adams, Taylor Cochran and Jamie Lauren, supervising producers; Jessica Guerra, Caitlin Henley, Kristen Kapsaskis, Joon Hee Lim and Tessa Saville, supervising story producers; Diana Schmedeman, producer; Steve Lichtenstein, senior producer	Bravo
2026 (78th)
2026 (78th)	**The Traitors** **(Season 4)**	**Stephen Lambert, Mike Cotton, Sam Rees-Jones, Rosie Franks, Tim Harcourt, Jack Burgess, Darrell Olsen and Alan Cumming, executive producers; Claire O'Shea, Chris Mannion, Laura Gallen, Zoe Duerden, Emma Carroll, Sarah Pack and Cally Marriage, co-executive producers**	**Peacock**
2026 (78th)	Dancing with the Stars (Season 34)	Conrad Green and Ryan O'Dowd, executive producers; Alex Cross, Justin Mabardi, David Ruskey and Deena Katz, co-executive producers; Dominic Chaiduang, Katie Horbury, Parker Jones, Quinn Lipton and Adam Raia, supervising producers; Phillip Barbb, Matt Braun, Ann Conner, Michelle Debellis, Elizabeth Goldberg, Miguel Jefferson, Kayla Kalbfleisch, Lisa Kholostenko, Al Pop and Bryan Riches, senior producers; Amanda Foto, Jasmine Lesane, and Jacqueline Zogas, producers; Star Smith, line producer; Valoree Adamski and Shelby Kelle, senior supervising producers	ABC
2026 (78th)	RuPaul's Drag Race (Season 18)	Fenton Bailey, Randy Barbato, Tom Campbell, RuPaul Charles, Mandy Salangsang, Steven Corfe, Michele Mills, Daniel Blau Rogge, executive producers; Sara Kordy, John Polly, Thairin Smothers, Lisa Steele, Michelle Visage, co-executive producers; Michael Seligman, Julie Ha, supervising producers; Thea Burns and Alicia Gargaro-Magana, senior producers; Justin Healy, producer; Teresa Powell, line producer	MTV
2026 (78th)	Survivor (Seasons 49–50)	Jeff Probst, Matt Van Wagenen, Jesse Jensen, Kahaia Pearson, executive producers; Ryan Balthazor, Clark Bernstein, Brittany Crapper, David Dale Dryden, Dawn Haber, John B. Kirhoffer, Robyn Lane, Joe Lia, Jimmy Quigley and Hudson H. Smith III, co-executive producers; Zachariah Jensen, Christopher Marchand, Simon "Simo" Ross and Zach Sundelius, supervising producers; Andrea Joynt, producer	CBS
2026 (78th)	Top Chef (Season 23)	Casey Kriley, Jo Sharon, Doneen Arquines, Tracy Tong, Tom Colicchio and Gail Simmons, executive producers; John Adams, Hunter Braun, Nora Cromwell, Patrick Schmedeman, co-executive producers; Taylor Cochran and Caitlyn Owens, supervising producers; Kristen Kish and Diana Schmedeman, producers; Steve Lichtenstein, senior producer; Jim Hall, Timothy Hayward, Caitlin Henley, Kristen Kapsaskis, Damon Lewis, Joon Hee Lim and Tessa Saville, supervising story producers	Bravo

== Programs with multiple wins ==
10 wins

- The Amazing Race (7 consecutive, then 2 consecutive)

5 wins

- RuPaul's Drag Race (4 consecutive)

4 wins

- The Voice (3 consecutive)

3 wins

- The Traitors (consecutive)

== Programs with multiple nominations ==
Totals have been combined with Outstanding Special Class Program, where competition programs were previously eligible.

22 nominations

- The Amazing Race

20 nominations

- Top Chef

14 nominations

- Project Runway

13 nominations

- The Voice

12 nominations

- Dancing with the Stars

10 nominations

- RuPaul's Drag Race

9 nominations

- American Idol
- Survivor

5 nominations

- So You Think You Can Dance

4 nominations

- American Ninja Warrior
- Nailed It!

3 nominations

- The Traitors

2 nominations

- The Apprentice

== Total awards by network ==
- CBS – 10
- NBC – 4
- VH1 – 4
- Peacock – 3
- Bravo – 1
- MTV – 1
- Prime Video – 1

== See also ==
Critics' Choice Television Award for Best Reality Series – Competition
