= The Great Escape (American TV series) =

- Genre: Reality competition
- Created by: Justin Hochberg; Charlie Ebersol
- Presented by: Rich Eisen
- Starring: Lee Reherman; Xango Henry; Dustin Dennard
- Country of origin: United States
- Original language: English
- No. of seasons: 1
- No. of episodes: 9

Production
- Executive producers: Ron Howard; Brian Grazer; Francie Calfo; Elise Doganieri; Bertram van Munster
- Running time: 42 minutes
- Production companies: Fox Television Studios; Imagine Television; Profiles Television Productions; The Hochberg Ebersol Company

Original release
- Network: TNT
- Release: June 24 – August 26, 2012

The Great Escape is a reality television series on TNT that premiered on June 24, 2012, at 10:00 pm EDT. The competition series, hosted by Rich Eisen, features three two-person teams each week who are dropped "into the middle of their own epic action/adventure movie" and competing for a cash prize. The show is produced by Imagine Television directors Ron Howard and Brian Grazer, and The Amazing Race producers, Bertram van Munster and Elise Doganieri. The series finished airing on August 26, 2012 and was cancelled in October 2012.

== Development ==
TNT ordered a pilot episode of The Great Escape from Imagine Entertainment in November 2010, with both Ron Howard and Brian Grazer serving as executive producers, and was considered an initial foray into the reality television market for the network. Bertram van Munster and Elise Doganieri, the creators of The Amazing Race, were added as executive producers in mid-2011, prior to casting and filming of the pilot. Subsequently, in January 2012, TNT announced that it has greenlit ten episodes (only airing nine of them) of The Great Escape, stating that the program has "all the heart-pounding excitement and nail-biting suspense of a summer popcorn movie".

The show was produced as to create an experience for the players and the audience of being inside a movie; Howard noted that the elements of clues and puzzle-solving bring to mind his earlier films, The Da Vinci Code and Apollo 13. After selecting a site, the route is carefully crafted as to keep contestants from going too far off the target course, particularly in dangerous environment such as a bayou. Production arrives about a week before filming to prepare the area and create any necessary props for the challenge or the course; in the case of the bayou, homemade shacks were constructed for the starting point for the teams. Challenges are tested to make sure that they are doable within reasonable time prior to filming. Contestant are given as much freedom as necessary to complete the game, with production stepping in only to stop players from certain actions.

== Format ==
Each episode is a single competition among three teams of two contestants with a previous relationship, such as family relations, lifelong friends, or married or dating couples. Teams are identified by the color of shirts they wear.

The teams are escorted while blindfolded to an undisclosed location, which varies with each episode. They are locked in cells with the game's "Detainment Zone" that include a concealed map and the means to release themselves from their cell (such as with a key or with a set of bolt-cutters). When the game starts, teams must find the map, free themselves, and follow the instructions on the map to the first of four stages. Each stage includes a physical or mental challenge the teams must complete that gives them directions to the next stage, a part of a larger "Escape Key", and other miscellaneous tools such as flashlights, which are used as part of the next Stage or for their transport. Teams must complete these tasks on their own, typically each given their own identical station, puzzle, or set of equipment to work with. When traversing between stages or working on challenges, teams must avoid detection by "guards" and/or spotlights. If they are spotted, the guard yells out, "(Red/Blue/Green) team, stop!", and the captured players are forced to drop all current implements (other than the map) to be re-escorted to the Detainment Zone, where they then must again find the means to escape from detainment. Once free, they can proceed to the point they were captured and recover their equipment, but again must avoid detection by the guards. An announcer broadcasts to all teams when a team has escaped from their cell, completed the next stage, quit the game, or has been captured by guards, allowing other teams to judge their progress. The announcer also broadcasts when the competition is over and which team won. The other two teams are not shown completing the other tasks.

After completing four stages, the teams will need to assemble the Great Escape Key to identify their final destination and reach a "Transport Zone" to be taken to this place. The first team to successfully arrive at this destination (where the host is) with the completed Escape Key is awarded the $100,000 prize.

== Episodes ==
No.	Title	Winning team	Second place	Third place	Original release date	Viewers (millions)
1	"Escape from Alcatraz"	Red	Green	Blue	June 24, 2012	1.616
Location: Alcatraz Island Teams began being locked into cells in the main cell block (or the detainment zone), and had to locate a map and a key to release themselves from the cell, heading towards the recreation yard.: Stage 1: Teams were to find a way to open a lockbox that contained their next destination and a math puzzle that would reveal the combination to a lock on gates leading out of the recreation yard towards that while trying to evade prison spotlight & patrolling guards.; Stage 2: In the administration building, teams were to use a set of magnets to retrieve a bag containing their next clue.; Stage 3: Teams had to find a room in the armory containing ammo boxes and sandbags, to look for a bag containing a key to the boat docks and their next clue.; Stage 4: Teams searched through the power plant building for a hidden gas can that included instructions for the Transport Zone.; Escape: Upon reaching the Transport Zone, the island's docks, the teams took a Zodiac boat to Pier 3 in San Francisco.; Teams: Red – Miles Stoner and Megan Stoner(brother/sister); Green – Jeff and Lexx (friends); Blue – Gabe and Brittany (engaged); Results: Red wins the grand prize of $100,000 with Green and Blue finishing second and third respectively. Green arrived at the finish point later than Red while Blue were still on Alcatraz when it was announced that the Red team had won.
2	"Escape from the USS Hornet"	Red	Green	Blue	July 1, 2012	1.410
Teams had to escape through several areas of the USS Hornet in the second episode. Location: USS Hornet (CV-12) Teams began being locked inside USS Hornet's brig (or the detainment zone), and had to retrieve a pair of wire cutters outside their cell to unlock themselves from their cells.: Stage 1: Teams located a key hidden underwater within the ballast room, to unlock a locker with their next clues. Between stages, the players had to use tools given to open or break through doors throughout the ship.; Stage 2: Teams had to pull up a crate from the torpedo storage area in the torpedo room to get their next clue and key.; Stage 3: Within the chain locker, teams raised a chain which was attached to a flag with a code for Stage 4 and their next key.; Stage 4: Teams made their way to the Combat Information Center to decipher the code from the flag in Stage 3, which opened a safe containing a key card for a door to the flight deck and other equipment for the escape.; Escape: Teams had to make it to the flight deck, and then rappel down the sides to a waiting platform. From there, they inflated a balloon to signal for transport to a Coast Guard ship sailing nearby.; Teams: Red – Tim and McKenna (father/daughter); Green – Armando and Victor (best friends); Blue – Sal and Jeanan (brother/sister); Results: Red wins with Green and Blue finishing second and third respectively. Green was on the Transport Zone's Platform and Blue was still inside USS Hornet when it was announced that the Red team had won.
3	"Escape from the Institution"	Red	Green	Blue	July 8, 2012	1.249
The historic Preston Castle in Ione, California, was staged as a mental institution for the third episode. Location: Preston Castle All teams started in the detainment zone, where they were restrained the way patients were "back in the day". They had to break free from the restraints and find the map hidden somewhere in the room. Prior to the remaining stages, the teams had to rappel down a bedsheet-rope.: Stage 1: Teams must recover a box containing a bone saw, a piece of the Escape key, and their next destination from a cage in the Rehabilitation room.; Stage 2: Using the bone saw, teams must cut ropes holding up a cage within the Dormitory to access a set of wires, the next piece of the key, and their next destination.; Stage 3: Special film projectors were set up in the Infirmary which would only run if both team members were wearing a head restraint. The film showed a number of pairs of photos and abstract images. The players had to remember these pairings to use the wires to match the pairs on an electrical box to access the next stage as well as a shovel and their next key.; Stage 4: At the Dig Site, teams had to unearth a water-filled pit, and then locate a set of bedsheets and the final part of the key.; Escape: The Transport Zone had laundry trucks waiting to take the players to the destination on the Great Escape key, once instructed. However, they had to hide themselves within a laundry trolley as the truck passed through a checkpoint or would be forced back to detainment.; Teams: Red – Rick and Lori Ann (married); Green – Martin and Eric (best friends); Blue – Michael and Deja (engaged); Results: Red wins with Green and Blue finishing second and third respectively. Green was at the Transport Zone trying to figure out the final destination and Blue was still inside The Institution when it was announced that the Red team had won.
4	"Escape from Titan Missile Silo"	Green	Blue	Red	July 15, 2012	1.160
Teams had to escape from the depths of the Titan Missile Museum to win the prize in the fourth episode. Location: Titan Missile Silo Teams were locked inside a Titan missile silo in Arizona, handcuffed to pipes within makeshift cages at the bottom of the silo. To escape, they had to grab a key to the handcuffs that hung from a chain between them.: Stage 1: Teams had to work in tandem to remove a set of drill bits and the first piece of a key from a shrouded glove box in the chemical cleaning room.; Stage 2: Prior to Stage 2, teams had to pull themselves up out of the silo via ropes. At Stage 2, they needed to don radiation suits and enter a decontamination hallway to find barrels and a power tool. One barrel contained a smaller container that could be opened with the power tool and drill bits to obtain the next part of the key and a piece of transparency.; Stage 3: Teams had to use the transparency with a lit board in the control room to find a six-digit code; they then had to make their way to the missile launch room, enter this code, and then turn the firing keys simultaneously to open a locker containing a crowbar and the next part of the key. Once at Stage 3, if teams were caught by guards, they could use an elevator to bypass the rope climb of Stage 2.; Stage 4: At the surface, teams had to use the crowbar to open a large crate and retrieve a tire, lugnuts, and the final piece of the key.; Escape: Teams had to dig under the fence of the facility to clean themselves and their equipment through it. They then had to secure the tire to one of the escape vehicles before they could drive off to the final point, a nearby bunker.; Teams: Red – Whitney and Sarah (friends); Green – Rob and Angela (engaged); Blue – Harry and Troy (best friends); Results: Green wins with Blue and Red finishing second and third respectively. Green defeated Blue by a hair. Red was still at the crate of Stage 4 when it was announced that the Green team had won.
5	"Escape from Air Force Boneyard"	Red	Blue	Green	July 22, 2012	1.096
The AMARG plane boneyard in Arizona was the stage for this episode. Location: The 309th Aerospace Maintenance and Regeneration Group airplane boneyard at Davis-Monthan Air Force Base, Arizona. Unlike previous escapes, this took place during the day, with increasing temperatures above 100 °F (38 °C). For this escape, teams had to avoid being in sight of patrolling vehicles that drove prescribed paths around the boneyard. Teams started the escape tied up within one of the abandoned planes, and had to find their map and a black light flashlight that identified a panel to exit from. They then collected a rucksack containing a shovel and other supplies.: Stage 1: Teams dug up a crate containing a tirfor winch which they used to pull down a communications tower. In the tower's wreckage, teams had to locate a screwdriver, a windsock with an identification number, and the first part of the escape key.; Stage 2: Using the code on the windsock, teams had to find a specific drop tank out of several, then undo its hatch to find a bag of projectiles and the next key part.; Stage 3: Teams assembled a pneumatic bazooka to launch projectiles at a target on a C-5 Galaxy aircraft. Hitting the target would open the door to the aircraft; teams would then retrieve a Morse code guide and the next key, but had to use a zip line within the plane to reach the cockpit and next stage.; Stage 4: In the cockpit, teams had to decipher a series of flashing lights as Morse code to get a key to unlock an escape hatch, giving them access to a knife and the last part of the key.; Escape: Teams had to use the knife to free a utility vehicle from a C-130 Hercules, and then drive it to the final destination, a nearby bunker.; Teams: Red – Justin and Robert (best friends); Green – Michael and Justin (brothers); Blue – Melissa and Morgan (models); Results: Red wins with Blue finishing second. Blue were inside the Galaxy's cockpit trying to complete Stage 4 when it was announced that the Red team had won. The Green team dropped out after one member suffered from the effects of heat stroke at the first stage.
6	"Escape from Los Angeles"	Blue	Red	Green	August 5, 2012	1.006
Teams traversed underground passages near the Los Angeles City Hall. Location: Los Angeles Teams had to escape from a maze of underground corridors and city streets in downtown Los Angeles. They were locked in cages within one of the underground corridors and had to escape via a floor hatch after locating their map.: Stage 1: In the California Highway Patrol storage room, teams had to use marked dates on a calendar to open a safe to retrieve a flashlight and the first part of the key.; Stage 2: Teams had to crawl through a sludge-filled sewage pipe to locate a cell phone and the next part of the key.; Stage 3: Teams used mops to wash part of the City Hall steps to locate a telephone number and then seek out a nearby knife and the next part of the key.; Stage 4: In the City Hall rotunda, teams dialed the number from Stage 3 into the cell phone they got from Stage 2 to locate a hidden phone behind one of a number of portraits. Once located, they would slash open the portrait with the knife from Stage 3 to obtain the last part of the key and keys to a vehicle parked nearby.; Escape: The key would lead the teams to the helipad on the top of Caltrans District 7 Headquarters in Los Angeles. After driving there, they locate a secret entrance and then climb fourteen stories to the roof to complete the escape.; Teams: Red – Dara and Alix (mother/daughter); Green – Jevin and Latasha (married); Blue – Jared and Dwight (son/father); Results: Blue wins with Red finishing second. Red was on their way to the final destination when it was announced that the Blue team had won. Green quit trying to locate City Hall/Stage 3 due to their failures to prevent several captures.
7	"Escape from the Power Station"	Green	Blue	Red	August 12, 2012	0.81
Location: Placerita Water & Power Plant in Santa Clarita, California Teams has to release themselves from the top of cooling towers and climb tower to escape the containment zone.: Stage 1: Teams used ropes to climb down across furnace vents, and then had to use tools from the containment zones to enter a furnace to retrieve a set of power cables and the first part of the key.; Stage 2: Teams had to assemble the power cables to make three runs of equal length connecting a power box to a safebox. Once powered, the safebox would open to let teams get the next part of the key, a sledgehammer, and a hazard symbol they had to memorize.; Stage 3: At a makeshift cinderblock structure, teams determined which wall had the same symbol as from the previous stage, and then used the hammer to knock out that wall. They then had to crawl inside to get a valve handle and the next part of the key.; Stage 4: Teams used the valve to set water flowing through a maze of pipes. They had to set the valves in the maze to direct water to a vertical tube containing a float as to have the float push out into a large water tank. They then recovered the float, containing a key to a lockbox at the bottom of the tank to get the last key part.; Escape: Teams had to zip-line down from a structure to waiting cars. From there, they made their way to a transformer station on the site to reach the end.; Teams: Red – Natalie and Crescent (neighbors); Green – Gregg and Jessica (married); Blue – Lee and Matt (brothers); Results: Green wins with Blue and Red finishing second and third respectively. Blue was only minutes behind at arriving at the final destination. Red was still at Stage 3 when the announcement of Green winning occurred.
8	"Escape from the Swamp"	Red	Green	Blue	August 19, 2012	1.067
For this episodes, teams worked their way through a bayou near Des Allemands, Louisiana. Location: Swamp in Des Allemands, Louisiana: Stage 1: Teams had to make their way to an abandoned cooking site, and had to use tools to break free of the ball and chains that had been placed on their ankles in the detainment zone. They then had to climb into a cauldron full of crawfish and find a bag containing the first piece of the Great Escape key and a slingshot.; Stage 2: Teams then had to make their way to a "voodoo camp" where they had to use the slingshot to knock down three voodoo dolls. They then had to rip the dolls open to find a candle, pieces of paper and the second part of the Great Escape key.; Stage 3: After making their way to a cemetery, teams had to use their candles and paper to rub the headstones in order to reveal a date. After finding the headstone with the same date, they had to dig up a toolbox containing fishing hooks and lines and the next piece of the Great Escape key.; Stage 4: Teams had to get to a waterway, and using their fishing hooks and lines and a provided pole, had to fish for the correct buoy which held a bag containing an alligator skull and the final piece of the key.; Escape: Teams had to use the alligator skulls' teeth to cut two ropes which were connected to a canoe. Once the ropes were cut, they had to paddle their way to a boat which marked the end of the escape.; Teams: Red – Paul and Jenn (married); Green – Luke and Tim (friends); Blue – Davee and Beth (dating); Results: Red wins with Green and Blue finishing second and third respectively. Green arrived at the final destination seconds later (Green not shown arriving) and Blue was getting ready to paddle towards the final destination when the announcement of Red winning occurred.
9	"Escape from the Tower"	Green	Red	Blue	August 26, 2012	0.873
Teams had to escape through several floors of One World Trade Center in Long Beach, California. Location: One World Trade Center in Long Beach, California Teams were tied by their ankles and confined in ventilation ducts at the top of the skyscraper. They had to locate scissors and their map to escape.: Stage 1: On the roof, teams had to manipulate a camera mounted on a pulley along the side of the building to find an office window with an LED display, showing a four-digit code. They then had to retrieve a remote joystick and the first part of the key from the camera itself.; Stage 2: Inside the building, teams used the remote joystick to manipulate a robot inside a clean room to retrieve a case and deposit it in a slot; they then used the four-digit code obtained on Stage 1 to open the slot and retrieve the case, containing infrared goggles and the next part of the key.; Stage 3: On another floor, teams had to work their way through a series of laser beams; breaking any beams would trigger an alarm and alert a guard. When the alarm stops, the team must redo the attempt to cross the lasers. Once through the beams, they had to simultaneously activate separate biometric scanners to deactivate the beams while recovering a USB drive and the next part of the key.; Stage 4: On another floor, teams entered a pitch-black room and used the infrared goggles to locate a password from a wall with several alphabetic characters written. With those letters, they then had to find and use a computer along with the USB drive to unlock a compartment containing the last part of the key, and information where teams would find the keys to the escape car on the car themselves.; Escape: Teams had to rappel down the last few floors and into a dumpster to where the transport cars were waiting, and locate the key from the location shown to them in Stage 4. They then used the car's on-board GPS to travel to the location on the key, the Long Beach Lighthouse.; Teams: Red – Sally and Carol (twins); Green – Nick and Sara (couple); Blue – Matt and Michael (friends); Results: Green wins with Red and Blue finishing second and third respectively. Red had just left the Transport Zone's dumpsters and Blue was just completing Stage 3's labyrinth of security lights when the announcement of Green winning occurred.

== Reception ==
The Great Escape has been likened to The Amazing Race and, in at least one case, considered a "lite" version of the latter show. Mary McNamara of the Los Angeles Times felt that though there was little chance to get to know the individual teams as one would on The Amazing Race, the shorter format avoids the post-show celebrity pitfalls; McNamara noted that "The contestants are playing a game, not transforming themselves as human beings". Rodney Ho, writing for the Atlanta Journal-Constitution, felt each episode was like a mini-movie with "ultra-cool" venues and "thumping, dramatic music", but the challenges offered in the opening episodes were "less interesting" and "not nearly as outrageous" as challenges on other reality shows. Rob Owen of the Pittsburgh Post-Gazette felt the show was "overly produced", such as the means by which the guards are to detect the teams, and that with teams rotating in each week, it was "pretty much impossible to invest in characters who are essentially guest stars".

The first episode had received approximately 1.6 million viewers, but lost nearly half of those by the season finale, facing competition from other shows on Sunday night in the summer block; in comparison, TNT's dramas such as The Closer and Major Crimes had viewerships in excess of 7 million through the summer and were the highest watched shows for the network. TNT announced in October 2012 that it has not opted for a second season of the show, though will continue to test out other unscripted shows for their network.
