= Landmark Square (Long Beach) =

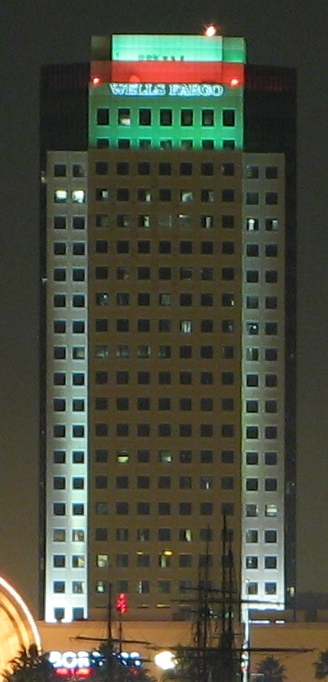
- Interactive map of the Landmark Square area

General information
- Status: Completed
- Architectural style: Modernism
- Location: Long Beach, California, 111 West Ocean Boulevard
- Coordinates: 33.76758°N 118.19334°W
- Completed: 1991
- Owner: TrizecHahn Properties Development, Brookfield Properties

Height
- Architectural: 312 feet (95 m)

Technical details
- Material: Granite
- Floor count: 24
- Floor area: 440,029 ft^{2} (40,880.0 m^{2})
- Lifts/elevators: 13

Design and construction
- Architect: Landau Partnership
- Structural engineer: Englekirk Partners, Inc.

Other information
- Parking: 1,438

Landmark Square is a 24-story office building in Long Beach, California. It is the fourth tallest building in Long Beach at a height of 312 feet (95 meters), only surpassed in height by One World Trade Center, West Ocean Condominiums 1 and, as of 2021, Shoreline Gateway East Tower. Landau Partnership designed the building, while Englekirk Partners, Inc. was the structural engineer. Landmark Square was completed in 1991. The high-rise features a helipad on the roof and has received a LEED silver rating.

== See also ==
- List of tallest buildings in Long Beach
