= Allison Winn Scotch =

American author (born 1973)

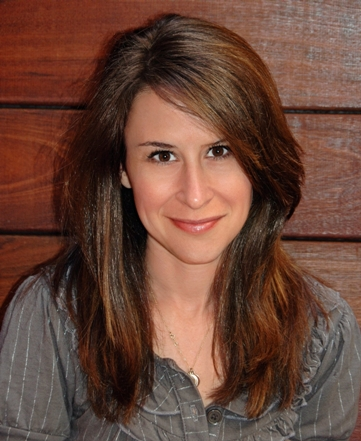
- Born: June 12, 1973 (age 53)
- Education: University of Pennsylvania
- Spouse: Adam Scotch
- Children: 2
- Writing career
- Period: 2007–present
- Genre: Contemporary fiction
- Website: allisonwinn.com

Allison Winn Scotch (born June 12, 1973) is a New York Times best-selling American author, best known for her novels The Theory of Opposites (2013), Time of My Life (2008), and The Department of Lost and Found (2007). She is also a magazine contributor and has written for, among others, Cooking Light, Fitness, InStyle Weddings, Men's Health, Prevention, Redbook, Self, Shape, and Women's Health. At present, she contributes celebrity interviews and profiles to American Way. Time of My Life is currently under development at The Weinstein Company, with Meryl Poster producing. Scotch runs a writing blog, Ask Allison, to which aspiring writers ask questions about the publishing industry. She currently lives in Los Angeles with her family and dogs.

== Novels ==
=== The Department of Lost and Found (2007) ===
Natalie Miller's picture-perfect life is upended: she's diagnosed with breast cancer, her cheating boyfriend leaves her, and her job as an aide to a senator is on the line. After chemo and a mastectomy, Natalie re-examines her life and past relationships, and has to decide what parts of her old life can remain “lost,” and what she needs to “find” to move forward. The novel hit the USA Today bestseller list.

=== Time of My Life (2008) ===
Jillian Westfield's living a “perfect” suburban life, with a successful husband and a sweet little toddler, but can't help thinking “what if” about the choices she made seven years ago. When she wakes up back in time in a pivotal moment in her life, she gets to choose whether to re-make her old choices, or choose a different path for her future. Time of My Life made The New York Times Best Sellers list in October 2008.

=== The One That I Want (2010) ===
Tilly Farmer worked hard for years to keep her family life together after her mother died when Tilly was only seventeen. She took care of her younger sisters, her dad got sober, and fifteen years later she is married to her high-school sweetheart and trying for a baby. Then a fortune-teller gives her the gift of clarity, and she can suddenly see terrible things happening before they occur, including her father's relapse and her husband's departure.

=== The Song Remains the Same (2012) ===
Nell Slattery survives a plane crash but loses her memory. Her friends and family attempt to shield her from difficult aspects of her past. In an effort to recover her memories, Nell uses photos, art, and a playlist titled “The Best of Nell Slattery” featuring significant songs from her previous life.

=== The Theory of Opposites (2013) ===
Willa has grown up under her father's belief system that everything happens for a reason and is beyond our control, which he wrote a bestselling book about. But one day her husband decides he wants a two-month break, and her life spins out of control. She loses her job, her ex re-contacts her, and she has to examine whether she really believes in fate or whether she is in control of her destiny.

=== In Twenty Years (2016) ===
Five former best friends come back to the house they shared at Penn to celebrate what would have been the 40th birthday of their sixth roommate, Bea. Bea's death fractured the formerly tight-knit group, and long simmering tensions erupt when they all get back together. Bea planned this before her death, hoping that with time and perspective the friends could come together and heal old wounds.

=== Between Me and You (2018) ===
Tatum and Ben meet when they are young aspiring artists: Tatum an actress and Ben a screenwriter. They fall in love and get married, and gradually grow apart as their career paths have separate highs and lows. Their love story is told in two arcs - one moving forward in time from Tatum's point of view, and one winding backwards from Ben's. By exploring their relationship in reverse, Ben tries to write his way back into love with Tatum.

== Film ==
In May 2008, The Weinstein Company optioned rights to Time of My Life, with Meryl Poster producing. In August 2009, they announced Nicole Eastman (The Ugly Truth) as the screenwriter. The option was repurchased by TWC in February, 2010.

In December 2013, Theory of Opposites was optioned by Jennifer Garner's production company, Vandalia Films.

In May 2020, SONY Pictures acquired Time of My Life for development with Meryl Poster.
