= One World Trade Center (disambiguation) =

One World Trade Center is a building in New York City.

One World Trade Center may also refer to:

- 1 World Trade Center (1970–2001), New York City
- One World Trade Center (Long Beach), in Long Beach, California
- World Trade Center (Portland), in Portland, Oregon
