= Bertram van Munster =

Dutch-born American TV show creator and executive producer

- Born: 1940 (age 85–86); Netherlands
- Occupation: Television producer
- Years active: 1984–present
- Spouse: Elise Doganieri
- Children: 3

Bertram van Munster (born 1940) is a Dutch-born American co-creator and executive producer of The Amazing Race. He is also the creator of Profiles from the Front Line and was the executive producer on Oprah's Big Give and Take the Money and Run.

Van Munster's television formats and productions have been sold and produced worldwide in territories including India, Africa, The Middle East, Australia, the Asia Pacific region, Israel and throughout Latin America and China.

His productions, although created for the American market, maintain international TV sensibilities. He has longstanding relationships with all major American television network and cable companies.

Van Munster is president and CEO of Worldrace Productions Inc, Profiles Television Productions LLC, and Earthview Inc (all based in Los Angeles, California). His companies have worked in association with Jerry Bruckheimer Television for The Amazing Race and other TV series currently in production; as well as in partnership with Active TV Asia, based in Singapore.

== Credits ==
=== Television ===
- The Amazing Race (2001–present) TV series (executive producer)
- The Quest (2014) TV series (executive producer)
- The Great Escape (2012) TV series (executive producer)
- Take the Money and Run (2011) TV series (executive producer)
- The Big Give (2007) TV series (executive producer)
- Raw Nature (2007) TV series (executive producer)
- Profiles from the Front Line (2003) TV series (executive producer)
- Wild Things (1998) TV series (executive producer)
- Cops (1989–present) TV series (co-producer / field producer)

=== Awards and nominations ===
==== Primetime Emmy Awards ====
The Primetime Emmy Awards are awarded annually by the Academy of Television Arts & Sciences. Bertram has been nominated for twenty-one Emmy awards and won nine.

Year	Nominee / work	Award	Result
2023	The Amazing Race	Outstanding Reality Competition Program	Nominated
2023	The Amazing Race: Patience, Is the New Me	Outstanding Directing for a Reality Program	Nominated
2022	The Amazing Race	Outstanding Reality Competition Program	Nominated
2021	The Amazing Race	Outstanding Reality Competition Program	Nominated
2021	The Amazing Race: Give Me a Beard Bump	Outstanding Directing for a Reality Program	Nominated
2019	The Amazing Race	Outstanding Reality Competition Program	Nominated
2019	The Amazing Race: Who Wants a Rolex?	Outstanding Directing for a Reality Program	Nominated
2018	The Amazing Race	Outstanding Reality Competition Program	Nominated
2018	The Amazing Race: It's Just a Million Dollars, No Pressure	Outstanding Directing for a Reality Program	Nominated
2017	The Amazing Race	Outstanding Reality Competition Program	Nominated
2016	The Amazing Race	Outstanding Reality Competition Program	Nominated
2015	The Amazing Race	Outstanding Reality Competition Program	Nominated
2014	The Amazing Race	Outstanding Reality Competition Program	Won
2014	The Amazing Race: Part Like the Red Sea	Outstanding Directing for Nonfiction Programming	Nominated
2013	The Amazing Race	Outstanding Reality Competition Program	Nominated
2012	The Amazing Race	Outstanding Reality Competition Program	Won
2012	The Amazing Race: Let Them Drink Their Haterade (Lake Manyara, Tanzania)	Outstanding Directing for Nonfiction Programming	Nominated
2011	The Amazing Race	Outstanding Reality Competition Program	Won
2011	The Amazing Race: You Don't Get Paid Unless You Win	Outstanding Directing for Nonfiction Programming	Nominated
2010	The Amazing Race	Outstanding Reality Competition Program	Nominated
2010	The Amazing Race: I Think We're Fighting the Germans, Right?	Outstanding Directing for Nonfiction Programming	Nominated
2009	The Amazing Race	Outstanding Reality Competition Program	Won
2009	The Amazing Race: Don't Let a Cheese Hit Me	Outstanding Directing for Nonfiction Programming	Nominated
2008	The Amazing Race	Outstanding Reality Competition Program	Won
2008	The Amazing Race: Honestly, They Have Witch Powers or Something	Outstanding Directing for Nonfiction Programming	Nominated
2007	The Amazing Race	Outstanding Reality Competition Program	Won
2006	The Amazing Race	Outstanding Reality Competition Program	Won
2005	The Amazing Race	Outstanding Reality Competition Program	Won
2004	The Amazing Race	Outstanding Reality Competition Program	Won
2003	The Amazing Race	Outstanding Reality Competition Program	Won
1994	Cops	Outstanding Informational Series	Nominated
1993	Cops	Outstanding Informational Series	Nominated
1990	Cops	Outstanding Informational Series	Nominated

==== Children's & Family Emmy Awards ====
Year	Nominee / work	Award	Result
2022	Outstanding Directing for a Multiple Camera Program	The Quest	Won

==== Directors Guild of America Awards ====
The Directors Guild of America Awards are awarded annually by the Directors Guild of America. Bertram has been nominated for nine DGA awards and won one.

Year	Nominee / work	Award	Result
2015	The Quest Episode: "The Quest: One True Hero"	Outstanding Directorial Achievement in Reality Programs	Nominated
2014	The Amazing Race Episode: "Beards in the Wind"	Outstanding Directorial Achievement in Reality Programs	Nominated
2012	The Amazing Race Episode: "You Don't Get Paid Unless You Win?"	Outstanding Directorial Achievement in Reality Programs	Nominated
2011	The Amazing Race Episode: "I Think We're Fighting the Germans, Right?"	Outstanding Directorial Achievement in Reality Programs	Nominated
2010	The Amazing Race Episode: "Don't Let a Cheese Hit Me"	Outstanding Directorial Achievement in Reality Programs	Nominated
2009	The Amazing Race Episode: "#1303"	Outstanding Directorial Achievement in Reality Programs	Nominated
2008	The Amazing Race Episode: "#1110"	Outstanding Directorial Achievement in Reality Programs	Won
2007	The Amazing Race Episode: "#1002"	Outstanding Directorial Achievement in Reality Programs	Nominated
2007	The Amazing Race Episode: "#805"	Outstanding Directorial Achievement in Reality Programs	Nominated

==== Producers Guild of America Awards ====
The Producers Guild of America Awards are awarded annually by the Producers Guild of America. Bertram has been nominated for twelve PGA awards and won three.

Year	Nominee / work	Award	Result
2015	The Amazing Race	Outstanding Producer of Competition Television	Nominated
2014	The Amazing Race	Outstanding Producer of Competition Television	Nominated
2013	The Amazing Race	Outstanding Producer of Competition Television	Won
2012	The Amazing Race	Outstanding Producer of Competition Television	Won
2011	The Amazing Race	Outstanding Producer of Live Entertainment & Competition Television	Nominated
2010	The Amazing Race	Outstanding Producer of Live Entertainment & Competition Television	Nominated
2009	The Amazing Race	Outstanding Producer of Live Entertainment & Competition Television	Nominated
2007	The Amazing Race	Outstanding Producer of Non-Fiction Television	Nominated
2006	The Amazing Race for The Amazing Race 7	Outstanding Producer of Non-Fiction Television	Nominated
2006	The Amazing Race for The Amazing Race 6	Outstanding Producer of Non-Fiction Television	Nominated
2005	The Amazing Race	Outstanding Producer of Non-Fiction Television	Won
2004	The Amazing Race	Outstanding Producer of Reality/Game/Informational Series Television	Nominated

== Alternative names ==
- Bertram Van Munster
- Bertum Van Munster
- Bertrum VanMunster
- Bertram Vanmunster
- Bertram van Muster
