= Saalim Hakim =

American football player (born 1990)

No. 15, 10
- Position: Wide receiver/ Safety/return specialist

Personal information
- Born: February 1, 1990 (age 36); Atlanta, Georgia, U.S.
- Listed height: 5 ft 11 in (1.80 m)
- Listed weight: 188 lb (85 kg)

Career information
- High school: Palo Verde (Las Vegas, Nevada)
- College: Tarleton State
- NFL draft: 2011: undrafted

Career history
- Las Vegas Locomotives (2011); Dallas Cowboys (2012)*; St. Louis Rams (2012)*; New Orleans Saints (2012–2013); New York Jets (2013–2014); Detroit Lions (2015)*; Kansas City Chiefs (2015); Cleveland Browns (2016)*
- * Offseason or practice squad member only

Career NFL statistics
- Total tackles: 9
- Return yards: 279
- Stats at Pro Football Reference

Saalim Abdul Hakim (born February 1, 1990) is an American former professional football player who was a wide receiver in the National Football League (NFL). He was signed by the Dallas Cowboys as an undrafted free agent in 2012. He played college football at Palomar College before transferring to the Tarleton State Texans. He is the younger brother of former NFL wide receiver and punt returner Az-Zahir Hakim.

== Amateur career ==
Hakim did not play organized football on any level until his senior year of high school. Hakim spent his first three years of high school at a Muslim school in Atlanta which did not have a football team. He then transferred to Palo Verde High School in Nevada. After graduating high school, he played college football at Palomar College in San Marcos, California before earning a scholarship to play for Cary Fowler at Tarleton State University in Stephenville, Texas. Hakim spent one season as a reserve at Tarleton State before leaving for the pros.

== Professional career ==
=== Las Vegas Locomotives ===
Hakim played the 2011 season with the Las Vegas Locomotives of the United Football League. He played four games in which he recorded 3 receptions, 81 receiving yards, and one receiving touchdown.

=== Dallas Cowboys ===
On April 30, 2012, Hakim signed with the Dallas Cowboys as an undrafted free agent. Hakim missed two weeks of training camp due to a finger injury and was released by the team before the start of the regular season.

=== St. Louis Rams ===
On November 7, 2012, Hakim signed with the St. Louis Rams.

=== New Orleans Saints ===
On December 18, 2012, Hakim was promoted from the practice squad to the active roster after the New Orleans Saints placed strong safety Corey White on injured reserve due to a knee injury. On August 31, 2013, he was released.

=== New York Jets ===
On October 10, 2013, Hakim signed with the New York Jets to join the practice squad. On December 13, Hakim was placed on the Jets' active roster, after a season-ending injury to receiver Stephen Hill.

On October 26, 2014, Hakim made a diving tackle on Buffalo Bills rookie receiver Sammy Watkins, who slowed down on his way to the endzone in celebration. Watkins was downed at the five after having gained 84-yards on the play. On August 29, 2015, Hakim was one of twelve players to be cut by the Jets.

=== Detroit Lions ===
On September 8, 2015, Hakim was signed to the Detroit Lions' practice squad. On September 17, he was released from practice squad.

=== Kansas City Chiefs ===
On October 13, 2015, Hakim was signed to the Kansas City Chiefs' practice squad. On November 9, he was promoted to the active roster. On November 28, Hakim was waived.

=== Cleveland Browns ===
Hakim signed with the Cleveland Browns on April 25, 2016. On May 2, he was released.

== Personal life ==
His brother is former NFL wide receiver Az-Zahir Hakim, was selected in the fourth round, 96th overall pick by the St. Louis Rams in the 1998 NFL draft. Hakim is a devout Muslim who prays five times daily.
