= Palo Verde High School =

Coordinates: 36°10′17″N 115°19′59″W

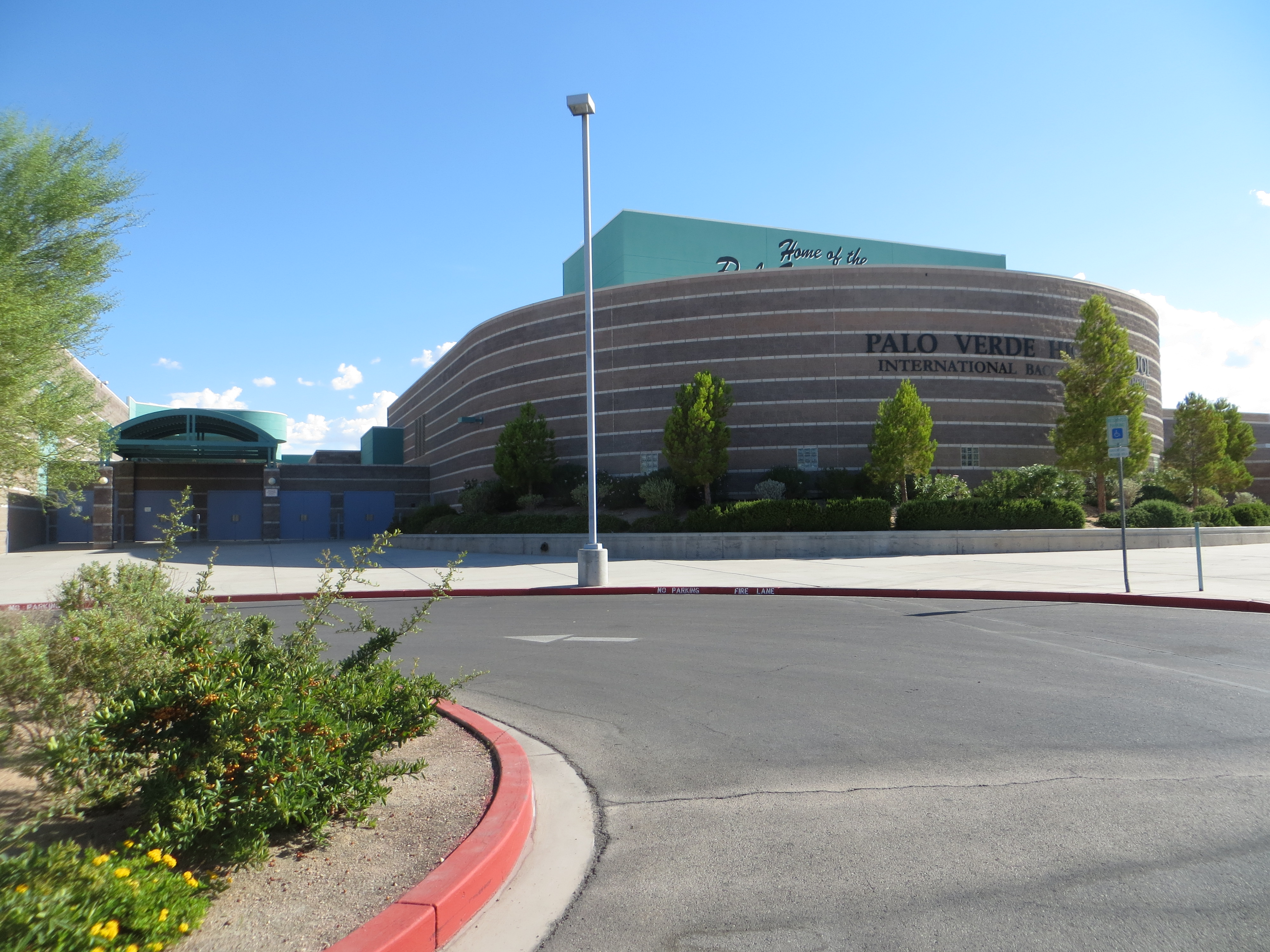

Location
- 333 South Pavilion Center Drive; Las Vegas, Nevada 89144

Information
- Type: Public high school
- Established: 1996; 30 years ago
- Locale: Summerlin
- School district: Clark County School District
- Teaching staff: 110.00 (FTE)
- Grades: 9–12
- Enrollment: 3,141 (2023-2024)
- Student to teacher ratio: 28.55
- Colors: Black; Green; Silver
- Mascot: Panther
- Website: Palo Verde High School

Palo Verde High School is a high school in Las Vegas, Nevada, United States. The school was built in 1996 with an adjacent 10 portable classrooms located in Summerlin, a rapidly growing suburban community in the western portion of the City of Las Vegas and unincorporated Clark County. The origin of the school's name comes from the surrounding palo verde trees. The school's ethnic ratio is 59.4% Caucasian; 17.1% Hispanic; 11.5% Asian/Pacific Islander; 11.4% African American and 0.6% Native American.

The school site includes a College of Southern Nevada (CSN) High Tech Center and an adjacent Parks and Recreation facility.

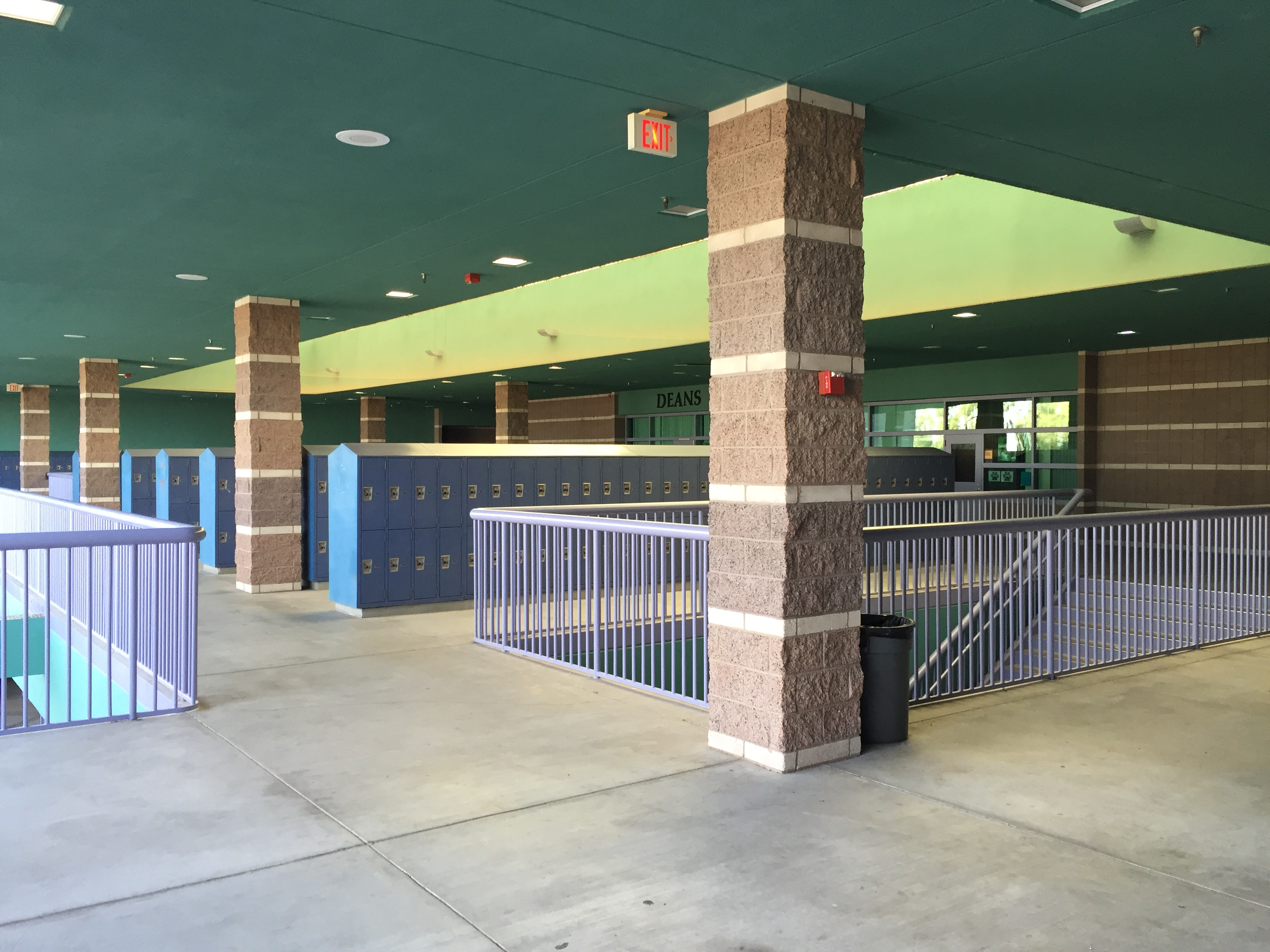
Interior of the school

== Athletics ==
Fall Sports

- Cross Country
- Football
- Women's Volleyball
- Men's Soccer
- Women's Golf
- Tennis
- Women's Soccer

Winter Sports

- Basketball
- Wrestling
- Women's Flag Football
- Bowling

Spring Sports

- Track
- Baseball
- Softball
- Men's Golf
- Men's Lacrosse
- Women's Lacrosse
- Men’s Volleyball
- Swimming and Diving

== Notable alumni ==
- Elle McLemore – Broadway actress
- Arianny Celeste – model and UFC Octagon Girl
- Daniel Bellinger – American football player
- Saalim Hakim – American football player
- Cassie Jaye – actress and filmmaker
- Brandon Kintzler – Major League Baseball pitcher
- Gerard Lawson – National Football League player
- Brittany Martin Porter – television producer
- Cody Miller – Olympic gold medalist swimmer for the United States
- Matt Polster – footballer, Victoria Highlanders, Chicago Fire, Rangers F.C., United States U23, United States
- Ryan Reeves – WWE professional wrestler, known as Ryback
- Erica Sullivan – Team USA Olympic swimmer
- Brendon Urie – lead singer of Panic! at the Disco
- Jessie Vargas – professional boxer
- Brent Wilson – bassist of Panic! at the Disco
