= Oprah's Big Give =

American television series

- Genre: Reality
- Created by: Oprah Winfrey
- Developed by: Harpo Productions
- Presented by: Nate Berkus
- Starring: Tony Gonzalez; Jamie Oliver; Malaak Compton-Rock
- Country of origin: United States
- Original language: English
- No. of seasons: 1
- No. of episodes: 8

Production
- Executive producers: Bertram van Munster; Elise Doganieri; Ellen Rakieten; Harriet Seitler; Jonathan Sinclair
- Production locations: Los Angeles; Denver; Houston; Miami; Atlanta; New York City; Chicago; Contestants' hometowns
- Running time: 60 minutes
- Production companies: Profiles Television Productions; Harpo Productions

Original release
- Network: ABC
- Release: March 2 – April 20, 2008

Oprah's Big Give (also referred to as The Big Give) is a reality television series hosted by Nate Berkus that aired on ABC. The Big Give was produced by Harpo Productions, created and produced by Oprah Winfrey, and also produced by Bertram van Munster and Elise Doganieri. On April 20, 2008, during the final show, Stephen Paletta was declared the winner and won the $1 million. Outside the United States, the series was distributed through FremantleMedia.

On May 13, 2008, ABC decided not to renew the series for a second season.

== Format ==
The show is the first prime time reality series by Harpo Productions, and focuses on 10 contestants as they travel across the country with a large sum of money, and try to help people in unique ways, and participate in a series of challenges in order to become America's greatest unknown philanthropist.

In each episode, contestants travel to a different U.S. city and are given some amount of money and an assignment. Sometimes the contestants are paired or grouped, and sometimes they may act as individuals. In some cities, contestants are assigned to help a particular individual or organization, while in others they are simply told to find people in need. The contestants then have the opportunity to raise additional money in order to reach their goals. At the end of each episode, the panel of judges selects one person to go home.

At the end of the season, it was revealed to the winner that they won $1 million ($500,000 for themselves, and $500,000 to give away).

== People Competing ==
=== Angelo ===
Angelo Adams is a former army captain born in Philadelphia who graduated from West Point. Angelo has two children and is currently in his second year at the University of Michigan Ross School of Business.

=== Brandi ===
Brandi Milloy is a four-time Miss America Organization title holder (Miss Sierra Vista, Miss Southeast Arizona, Miss Will County, and Miss Tarzana). who graduated from the University of Arizona. Brandi was diagnosed with scoliosis as a teenager.

=== Cameron ===
Cameron Johnson is a businessman who was a self-made millionaire in his teenage years. His first company was producing greeting cards for friends and family.

=== Carlana ===
Carlana Stone is a graduate from the University of California, Berkeley with a degree in Slavic language. Carlana became a paraplegic after an automobile accident in which she was a passenger in a drunk driver's car.

=== Eric ===
Eric Klein is the founder and CEO of CAN-DO.org, a nonprofit organization that enables people who make charitable donations to actually see how their money is being spent.

=== Kim ===
Kim Prentiss is a sports marketing executive who lives in Nashville. Kim described herself as selfish, and wants to turn her life around.

=== Marlene ===
Marlene Snipes is an Amtrak service attendant from Chicago. Marlene also is a motivational speaker and an aerobics instructor for her local church.

=== Rachael ===
Rachael Hollingsworth is a singer who currently lives in Hollywood, California. She was a victim of gang violence and sexual and physical abuse.

=== Sheg ===
Olusegun "Sheg" Aranmolate is a researcher at a university in Nashville and plans to attend medical school. Sheg has a bachelor's degree in biochemistry and molecular biology and a master's degree in applied molecular biology. Sheg also moved from Nigeria to the United States at the age of 18.

=== Stephen ===
Stephen Paletta was declared the biggest giver, and won the $1 million. He used some of the proceeds to start the GiveBack.org website.

== Chronology ==
The following table shows the contestants, along with the partner they had or team they participated on, as well as when they were eliminated.

- Contestant was eliminated
- Contestant was at risk (a contestant who was instructed to open his or her envelope at the same time as a contestant who was ultimately eliminated; see note 1)
- Contestant was immune (was informed before the envelopes were handed out, and thus did not receive one at all)
- No Teams - Contestants competed as individuals
- All Together - Contestants competed as one team

	Week 1	Week 2	Week 3	Week 4	Week 5	Week 6	Week 7	Week 8
	Los Angeles	Denver	Houston	Miami	Atlanta	New York City	Home Towns	Chicago
Stephen	Eric	See Note 2	Forgotten Christmas	No Teams	No Teams	All Together	No Teams	Winner
Brandi	Cameron	See Note 2	Forgotten Christmas	No Teams	No Teams	All Together	No Teams	Runner-Up
Cameron	Brandi	See Note 2	Forgotten Christmas	No Teams	No Teams	All Together	No Teams	Runner-Up
Rachael	Angelo	See Note 2	Field of Dreams	No Teams	No Teams	All Together		
Olusegun	Carlana	See Note 2	Field of Dreams	No Teams	No Teams			
Eric	Stephen	See Note 2	Forgotten Christmas	No Teams				
Kim	Marlene	See Note 2	Field of Dreams	No Teams				
Carlana	Olusegun	See Note 2	Field of Dreams					
Angelo	Rachael	See Note 2						
Marlene	Kim							

Note 1: After Week 4, contestants were no longer instructed to open their envelopes in a particular order. Thus, no 'At Risk' contestants were identified in subsequent weeks.
Note 2: In Week 2, contestants were not divided into teams, nor were they prohibited from forming teams. Eric, Stephen, and Cameron chose to work as a team, while the remaining contestants all worked individually.
Note 3: In Week 7, contestants flew to their hometowns and worked with family and friends to perform their give. It was revealed that no one would be eliminated.

== Ratings ==
#	Air Date	Timeslot (EST)	Rating	Share	18-49 (Rating/Share)	Viewers (m)	Weekly Rank (#)
1	March 2, 2008	Sunday 9:00 PM	9.4	14	5.3/12	15.55	4
2	March 9, 2008	Sunday 9:00 PM	7.4	11	4.1/10	11.83	10
3	March 16, 2008	Sunday 9:00 PM	6.0	9	3.6/9	9.71	18
4	March 23, 2008	Sunday 9:00 PM	6.1	10	3.5/9	9.92	19
5	March 30, 2008	Sunday 9:00 PM	7.1	11	3.9/9	11.35	13
6	April 6, 2008	Sunday 9:00 PM	5.9	9	3.2/8	9.42	27
7	April 13, 2008	Sunday 8:00 P.M.	5.6	9	2.9/9	8.88	19
8	April 20, 2008	Sunday 8:00 P.M.	6.4	10	3.2/9	10.03	TBA

== Response ==
In Fort Wayne, Indiana, $10,000 in seed money was received by ABC affiliate WPTA, which was then given to local trail organizations. A community celebration was held April 12, 2008, when it was revealed that the total donations had topped $1 million.

In Orlando, Florida, over $50,000 has been donated to a mentoring program for at-risk youth, in conjunction with a charitable program from ABC affiliate WFTV, that was inspired by Oprah's Big Give.

In Fresno, California, $10,000 was donated by the ABC affiliate KFSN on behalf of Oprah's Big Give, and turned over to CalFire for installing smoke detectors in rural county homes that do not have any, to save lives. This was in a response to the death of two young girls who died in a house fire in 2006.

The program has also been criticized. Hollywood Reporter described it as a phony and self-aggrandizing promotional vehicle for Oprah. Tom Shales of the Washington Post described the show as having an "unsavory aura of exploitation" and as being trite and predictable. Rick Kushman of the Daily Herald found the show boring, and worried that it could serve to make viewers feel "cynical about charity," which would in turn make them feel guilty. Variety's Brian Lowry called the show "a reality-TV Frankenstein, birthed from parts of other programs" and its judges "arbitrary," and generally found that the philanthropic theme of the show was inconsistent with the competitive reality genre. However, Lowry also recognized the show's "emotional appeal" and conceded that the show's heart is "in the right place."

== Distribution ==
Oprah's Big Give began airing on Wednesday, June 18, 2008, on TV3 in New Zealand at 7:30 PM. It also began airing on August 5, 2008, on NTV7 in Malaysia at 8:30 pm. The show premiered in the Philippines on August 25, 2008, on the cable channel Lifestyle Network at 9:00 pm. In the UK, the show made its debut on October 10, 2008, on Diva TV. In Belgium, the show began airing in September 2008 on Vitaya. In Hong Kong, the show starts airing on ATV World starting February 7, 2009. In Australia it airs on channel 10 starting on March 22, 2009.
