= West Ocean Condominiums 2 (Long Beach) =

Residential high-rise in Long Beach, California

Coordinates: 33°46′0.5″N 118°11′48″W

- Interactive map of the West Ocean Condominiums 2 area

General information
- Status: Completed
- Type: Residential
- Location: Long Beach, California, U.S., 400 West Ocean Boulevard
- Completed: 2007

Height
- Architectural: 253 ft (77 m)
- Tip: 253 ft (77 m)

Technical details
- Material: Concrete
- Floor count: 21

Design and construction
- Architects: Perkins & Co. Architecture & Urban Design
- Main contractor: Ledcor Construction Ltd.

West Ocean Condominiums 2 is a residential high-rise in Long Beach, California, United States. At a height of 253 ft (77 m), it is the ninth-tallest building in Long Beach. The building is one of two high-rises in its complex, with the other being West Ocean Condominiums 1, which is 92 ft (28 m) taller. The modernist building contains 21 storeys. Amenities include 24-hour security, a club house, fitness center, pool and spa, and wine storage room.

== See also ==
- List of tallest buildings in Long Beach
