= List of tallest buildings in Long Beach =

This list of tallest buildings in Long Beach, California ranks skyscrapers in Long Beach, California, by height. The tallest building is the Shoreline Gateway Tower at 417 feet(127m), second-tallest is One World Trade Center at 397 feet (121 m). The third-tallest is the West Ocean Condominiums 1 at a height of 345 feet (105 m).

== Cityscape ==
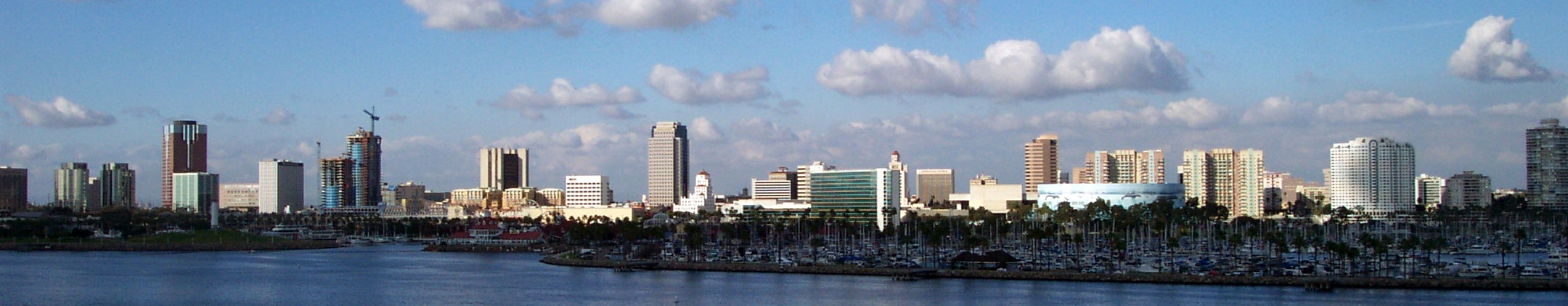
Panorama of Long Beach as viewed from the RMS Queen Mary in 2006

== Tallest buildings ==
This list ranks completed buildings in Long Beach that stand at least 200 ft (61 m) tall as of 2026, based on standard height measurement. This includes spires and architectural details but does not include antenna masts. The “Year” column indicates the year of completion. Buildings tied in height are sorted by year of completion with earlier buildings ranked first, and then alphabetically.

Was the tallest building in Long Beach upon completion

Rank	Name	Image	Location	Height ft (m)	Floors	Year	Purpose	Notes
1	Shoreline Gateway	—		417 (127.1)	35	2021	Residential	Tallest building in Long Beach since 2021. Tallest building completed in Long Beach in the 2020s.
2	One World Trade Center			397 (121)	30	1989	Office	Tallest building in Long Beach from 1989 to 2021. Tallest building completed in Long Beach in the 1980s. Tallest office building in Long Beach.
3	West Ocean Condominiums 1	—		345 (105.2)	29	2007	Residential	Tallest building completed in Long Beach in the 2000s.
4	Landmark Square			312 (95.1)	24	1991	Office	Tallest building completed in Long Beach in the 1990s.
5	Shoreline Square	—		279 (85)	20	1988	Residential	Tallest building in Long Beach briefly from 1988 to 1989.
6	Villa Riviera			277 (84.4)	16	1929	Residential	Tallest building in Long Beach from 1929 to 1988.
7	International Tower	—		277 (84.4)	27	1967	Residential	
8	HarborPlace Tower			262 (80) (Note: Sources do not state the exact height of this building. This figure was determined using Google Earth by subtracting the altitude of the building's lowest main pedestrian open-air entrance from its highest architectural point.)	22	1992	Residential	
9	West Ocean Condominiums 2	—		253 (77.1)	21	2007	Residential	
10	Onni East Village Apartments	—		252 (76.8)	24	2021	Residential	
11	Aqua Tower 1	—		238 (72.5)	22	2004	Residential	
12	Aqua Tower 2			238 (72.5)	22	2004	Residential	
13	California Bank and Trust Building			236 (72)	18	1968	Office	
14	Galaxy Towers Condominiums	—		224 (68)	20	1967	Residential	
15	Union Bank Building			223 (68)	14	1976	Office	
16	Arco Tower Building	—		223 (68)	14	1983	Office	Directly faces the Borg Warner Building.
17	Borg Warner Building	—		223 (68)	14	1983	Office	Directly faces the Arco Tower Building.
18	The Ocean Club			223 (68)	16	1988	Residential	
19	Breakers Hotel			221 (67.4)	14	1926	Hotel	Tallest building in Long Beach from 1926 to 1929.
20	Crocker Plaza	—		200 (61)	14	1982	Office	

== Tallest demolished ==
There has been one building that once stood taller than 200 ft (61 m) in Long Beach and has since been demolished.

Name	Image	Height ft (m)	Floors	Year completed	Year demolished	Purpose	Notes
Long Beach City Hall	—	271 (82.6)	14	1976	2022	Government	

== Timeline of tallest buildings ==
This lists buildings that once held the title of the tallest building in Long Beach.

Name	Image	Years as tallest	Height ft (m)	Floors	Notes
Breakers Hotel		1926–1929	221 (67.4)	14	
Villa Riviera		1929–1988	277 (84.4)	16	
Shoreline Square	—	1988–1989	279 (85)	20	
One World Trade Center		1989–2021	397 (121)	30	
Shoreline Gateway	—	2021–present	417 (127.1)	35	

== See also ==
- List of tallest buildings in Los Angeles
- List of tallest buildings in San Diego
