= Desiree Gruber =

American publicist

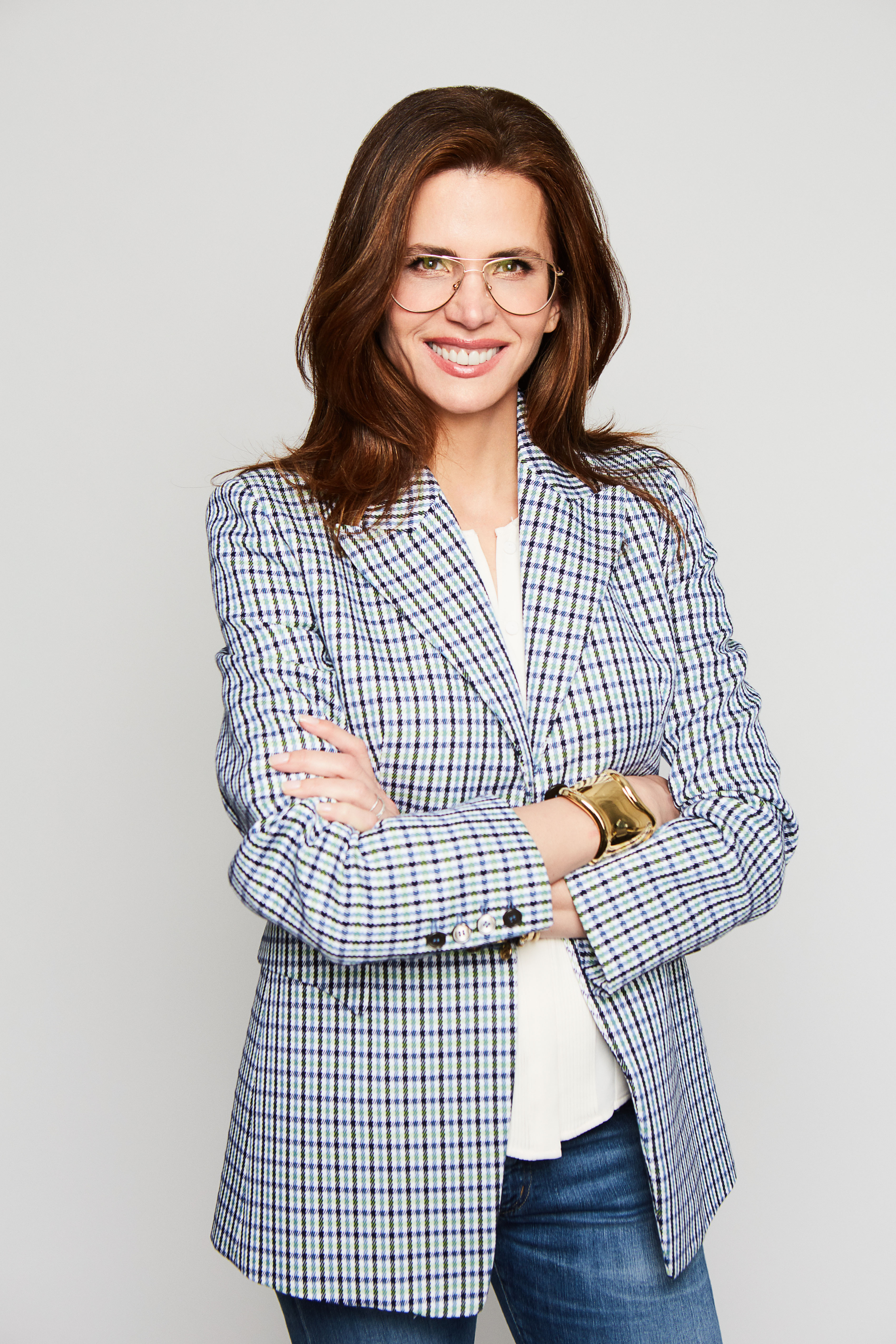
- Gruber in 2019.
- Born: June 25, 1967 (age 59); Miami, Florida, United States
- Occupations: Television producer; entrepreneur; fashion publicist; venture capitalist
- Years active: 1989–present
- Known for: Project Runway, Victoria's Secret Fashion Show
- Title: CEO of Full Picture; Co-Founder of DGNL Ventures
- Board member of: Tech:NYC; U.S. Fund for UNICEF New York Regional; God's Love We Deliver
- Spouse: Kyle MacLachlan (m. 2002)
- Children: 1
- Website: www.fullpicture.com

Desiree Gruber (born June 25, 1967) is an American television producer and entrepreneur. She was the executive producer of the fashion reality television competition Project Runway and the co-creator of Theodora and Callum, "an accessories-based line inspired by world travel." She is also the founder and CEO of a production company, Full Picture.

== Early life and education ==
Gruber was born on June 25, 1967, in Miami, Florida.

She started her professional career as an assistant in the A&R department for EMI Records in 1989, and as the general assistant on the New Music Seminar in 1990.

In 1991, she joined the marketing agency Rogers & Cowan as an assistant publicist, later promoted to director of entertainment, and eventually to vice president of entertainment in 1997. During her time there, she helped in the publicizing and branding of Victoria's Secret, The Limited Inc., and Elite Model Management. She also worked on U2's PopMart Tour and Miramax Films. In 1995, she produced the inaugural Victoria's Secret Fashion Show and has since produced the annual events for over 20 years.

In 1999, she left Rogers & Cowan to establish her own production company, Full Picture. In the beginning, her works included Victoria's Secret supermodel Heidi Klum and designer Roberto Cavalli. She developed a reality television series Project Runway along with Klum and Full Picture's executive Jane Cha. She had also done some advising to supermodel Naomi Campbell.

In 2016, she joined Nir Liberboim to co-found DGNL Ventures, an early-stage venture capital fund that has invested in brands including Living Proof, Songza, and Fashion GPS (Launchmetrics).

In 2023, Gruber was added to the CNBC Changemakers Advisory Board, to help select CNBC's annual Changemakers award list recognizing notable women in the business world.

== Philanthropy ==
In 2016, Gruber worked with the former First Lady of the United States Michelle Obama on her "Let Girls Learn" campaign.

As of 2018, Gruber was serving on the New York regional board for the U.S. Fund for UNICEF. She is also a board member of "God's Love We Deliver", which provides meals for people living with life-threatening illnesses.

Since 2001, she is a board member of God's Love We Deliver, which provides meals for people living with life-threatening illnesses.

== Personal life ==
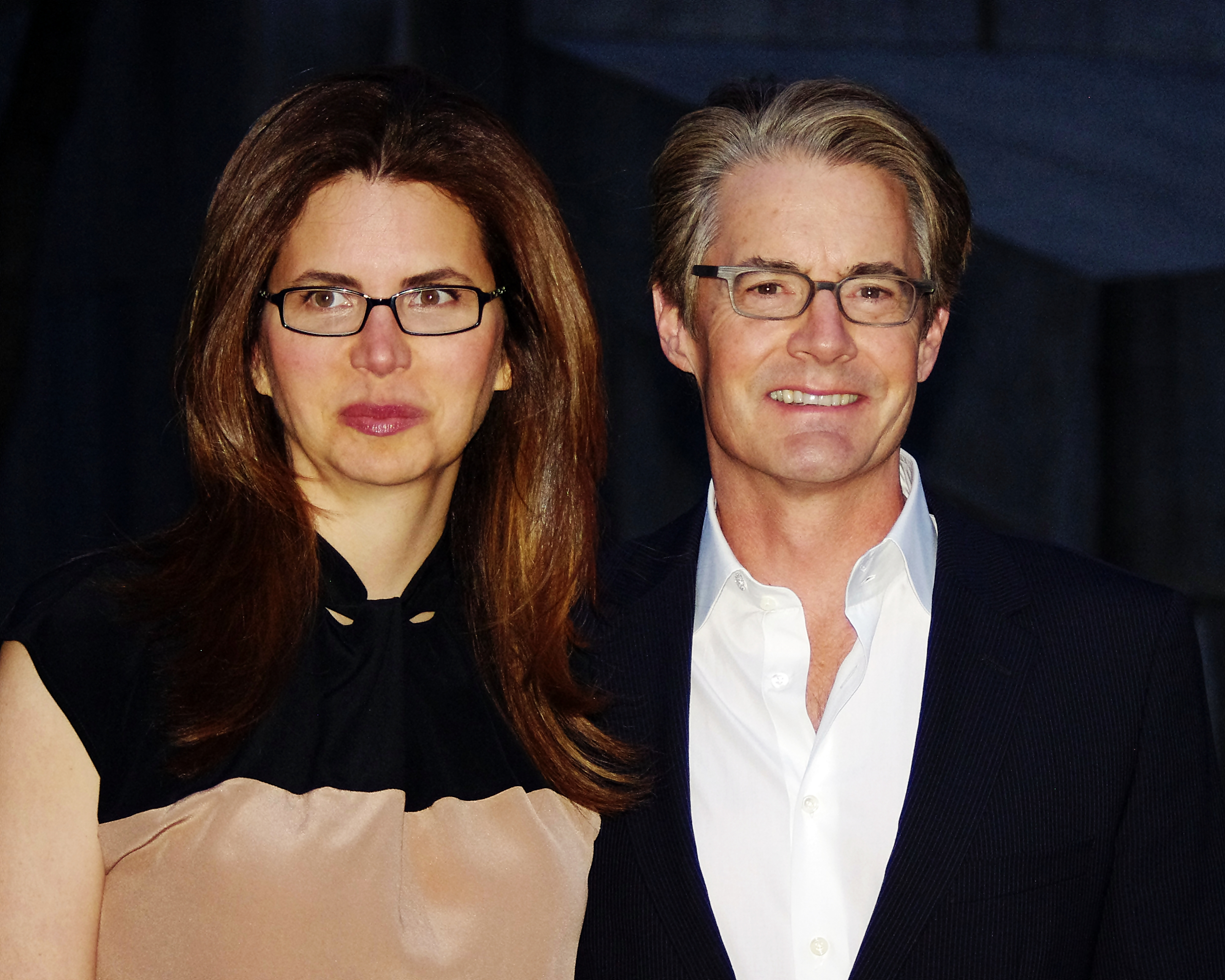
Gruber and Kyle MacLachlan, 2012

Gruber met and began a relationship with actor Kyle MacLachlan in 1999. They married on April 20, 2002. Their son, Callum Lyon MacLachlan, was born in Los Angeles in 2008. The family has residences in Los Angeles and New York. They have two dogs, Mookie and Sam.

== Awards and recognition ==
Gruber was one of Fortune magazine's Most Powerful Women Entrepreneurs of 2010. As an executive producer, Gruber was part of Project Runway, which was nominated for 14 Emmy Awards in Outstanding Reality Television Program, received a Peabody Award in 2007, a GLAAD Media Award, and "has also been honored with over twenty media industry awards."
