= Jonathan Littman =

American film producer (born 1962/63)

- Born: Jonathan Isaiah Littman; 1962 or 1963 (age 63–64)
- Education: Vassar College (B A.)
- Occupation: Film producer
- Known for: President of Jerry Bruckheimer Television
- Spouse: Nancy Jill Goldman
- Parent: Harold Littman

Jonathan Littman (born 1962/1963) is an American producer who serves as president of Jerry Bruckheimer Television.

== Biography ==
Littman was raised in West Orange, New Jersey, the son of Dr. Harold Littman and Annette Littman. He is a graduate of Vassar College. In 1987, he began his career at ABC working on children's and late-night programming and then accepted a position in 1989 at NBC as the director of the network's daytime programs, including the game show Concentration and the soap opera Santa Barbara. In 1991, he joined the newly formed Fox network where he was responsible for current programming and drama development, including such shows as Beverly Hills, 90210, Melrose Place, and The X-Files. In 1997, he left Fox for Jerry Bruckheimer Films, where he was hired to lead the company's expansion into television. While CEO of the television division, he convinced CBS Entertainment chief Nina Tassler to purchase Anthony E. Zuiker's Crime Scene Investigation concept, which evolved into the highly successful CSI: Crime Scene Investigation franchise. Other shows Littman produced while CEO of Jerry Bruckheimer Television include the CBS hits The Amazing Race, Cold Case, and Without a Trace, as well as Fox Television/Netflix's Lucifer and Starz's Hightown.

In July 2022, Littman left JBTV and formed a new production company, Littman Media, focusing on producing television series across all platforms.

== Awards and nominations ==
As of 2022, as part of the CSI and The Amazing Race teams, he has received 22 Emmy nominations and won 10 Emmy Awards.

== Personal life ==
In 1996, he married Nancy Jill Goldman, with whom he attended high school, at the Hotel Bel Air in Los Angeles; and is father to three daughters. He lives in Encino, California.
