= Brittany Martin Porter =

American television producer

Brittany Martin Porter, originally of Las Vegas, Nevada, is a three-time Emmy Award-winning American television producer. She won the 67th (2015), 68th (2016), and 69th (2017) Emmy Award for Outstanding Reality-Competition Program for The Voice on NBC. She also received a Primetime Emmy Award nomination in 2014 for Outstanding Reality-Competition Program and a 2017 Emmy Award nomination for Creative Achievement in Interactive Media Within an Unscripted Program for The Voice on Snapchat.

She is an alumna of Emerson College in Boston, Massachusetts and attended Palo Verde High School in Las Vegas.
