= Meryl Poster =

Meryl Poster is an American film producer. Until October 2014, she was president of television at The Weinstein Company. Poster was previously the co-president of production for Miramax Films, where she executive produced the Academy Award-winning Chicago (2002) and Academy Award-nominated Cider House Rules (1999) and Chocolat (2000). She is an executive producer of the Bravo drama The Girlfriend's Guide to Divorce -- Bravo's first ever scripted series -- which premiered in December 2014 and ran for 5 seasons.

== Career ==
=== William Morris ===
Poster had her beginnings as the second-ever female trainee in the New York Mailroom at the William Morris Agency.

=== Miramax ===
Poster served as the co-president of production for Miramax - alongside Jon Gordon - from 1998 to 2005.

=== NBC Universal ===
Poster had a producing deal at NBC Universal for five years, and served as a consultant for Chairman Jeff Zucker. She signed it up from 2005 to 2010 after leaving Miramax.

=== The Weinstein Company ===
In early 2011, Poster joined The Weinstein Company as president of television, having previously worked for Harvey and Bob Weinstein for 16 years at Miramax. While at The Weinstein Company, she oversaw all television development and production, including Project Runway and spinoffs After the Runway (2011), Project Accessory (2011), Project Runway All Stars (2012), Project Runway: Threads (2014), and Project Runway: Under the Gunn (2014). She has also developed VH1’s Mob Wives (2013) and spinoffs Big Ang (2012) and Mob Wives Chicago (2012), as well as Trailer Park: Welcome to Myrtle Manor (2013) on TLC, Rodeo Girls (2013) on A&E, Supermarket Superstar (2013) on Lifetime, Million Dollar Shoppers (2013) on Lifetime. In addition to reality television, Poster has paired with Amy Sherman-Palladino, creator and writer of Gilmore Girls, for an adaptation of The Nanny Diaries for ABC.

=== Superb Entertainment ===
Since then, Poster has developed her own production company, Superb Entertainment. The production company led on Poster's Ambie Award nominated, Call Your Grandmother. She also serves as an executive producer on an array of projects, including Jake Sumner's most recent documentary, that premiered at Tribeca Film Festival.

Poster is an artist in residence for the New Orleans Museum of Art, leading their "Producer's Choice" series.

== Filmography ==
Executive producer credits

Year	Film	Notes
1996	The Pallbearer	
1997	Cop Land	
1998	Wide Awake	
1999	The Cider House Rules	Film nominated for Academy Award for Best Picture
1999	Music of the Heart	Co-Producer
2000	Bounce	
2000	Chocolat	Film nominated for Academy Award for Best Picture
2001	Blow Dry	
2001	The Shipping News	
2002	Chicago	Film won the Academy Award for Best Picture
2003	Duplex	
2004	Dirty Dancing: Havana Nights	
2005	An Unfinished Life	
2011–Present	Project Runway	Nominated for Primetime Emmy Award for Outstanding Reality-Competition Program (2011–2015)
2011	After the Runway	
2011	Project Accessory	
2012	Supermarket Superstar	
2012–Present	Project Runway: All Stars	
2013–Present	Mob Wives	
2014	Under the Gunn	
2014	Cement Heads	
2014–Present	Girlfriends' Guide to Divorce	

== Awards ==
Year	Award	Nominated work	Won	
2001	Muse Award; New York Women in Film and Television	Meryl Poster	Won	
2003	Golden Globe Award for Best Musical or Comedy Picture	Chicago		Won
2012	Primetime Emmy Award for Outstanding Reality-Competition Program	Project Runway	Nominated	
2013	Primetime Emmy Award for Outstanding Reality-Competition Program	Project Runway	Nominated	
2014	Primetime Emmy Award for Outstanding Reality-Competition Program	Project Runway	Nominated	
2015	Primetime Emmy Award for Outstanding Reality-Competition Program	Project Runway	Nominated	
