= Elise Doganieri =

American TV show creator and producer

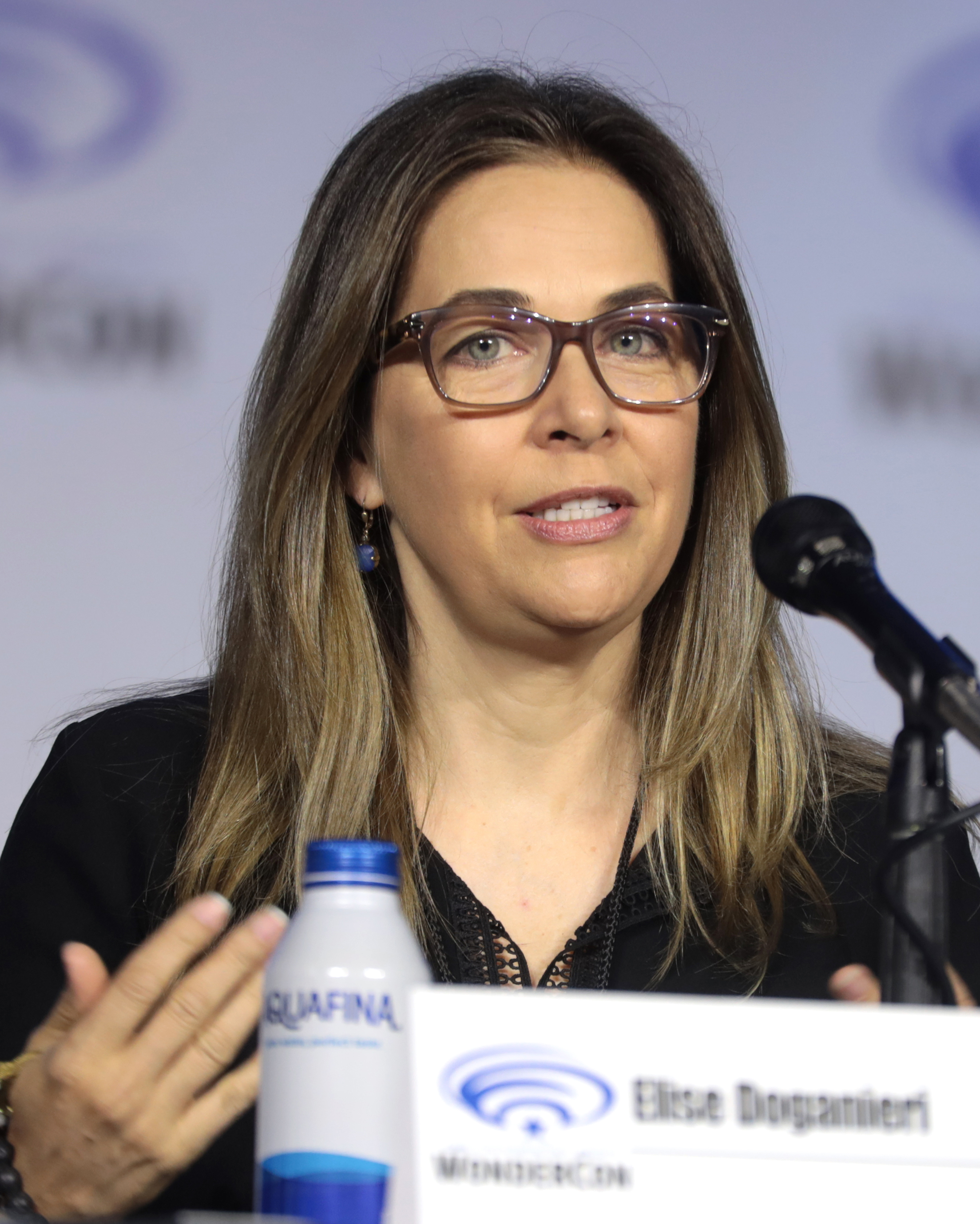
- Doganieri at WonderCon 2022
- Born: April 21, 1967 (age 59); Port Jefferson, New York, U.S.
- Occupations: Creator and producer
- Spouse: Bertram van Munster (? – present)
- Children: 1

Elise Doganieri (born April 21, 1967) is an American co-creator and co-executive producer of the CBS reality show The Amazing Race. Doganieri's other credits include serving as show producer of ABC's Profiles from the Front Line as well as producer and story editor on the pilot for Paramount's Wild Things.

The Amazing Race is a reality adventure series follows teams of two (teams of four in season 8) racing around the world for a one-million-dollar prize. The show hit its 100th episode mark in the fall of 2005 during its ninth season. The show has won the top reality series Emmy for seven years in a row. In 2004, received the Producers Guild Award. The series, which premiered in 2001, is produced by Earthview Inc. the production company that Elise Doganieri runs with her husband Bertram van Munster along with Bruckheimer TV and Touchstone TV.

Elise Doganieri is also an executive producer of Oprah Winfrey's reality show Oprah's Big Give and of The Quest television series. She had a cameo appearance in Hacks in 2026.

Doganieri lives in Los Angeles with her husband Bertram van Munster and their daughter Ava.
