= One World Trade Center (Long Beach) =

Building in Long Beach, California

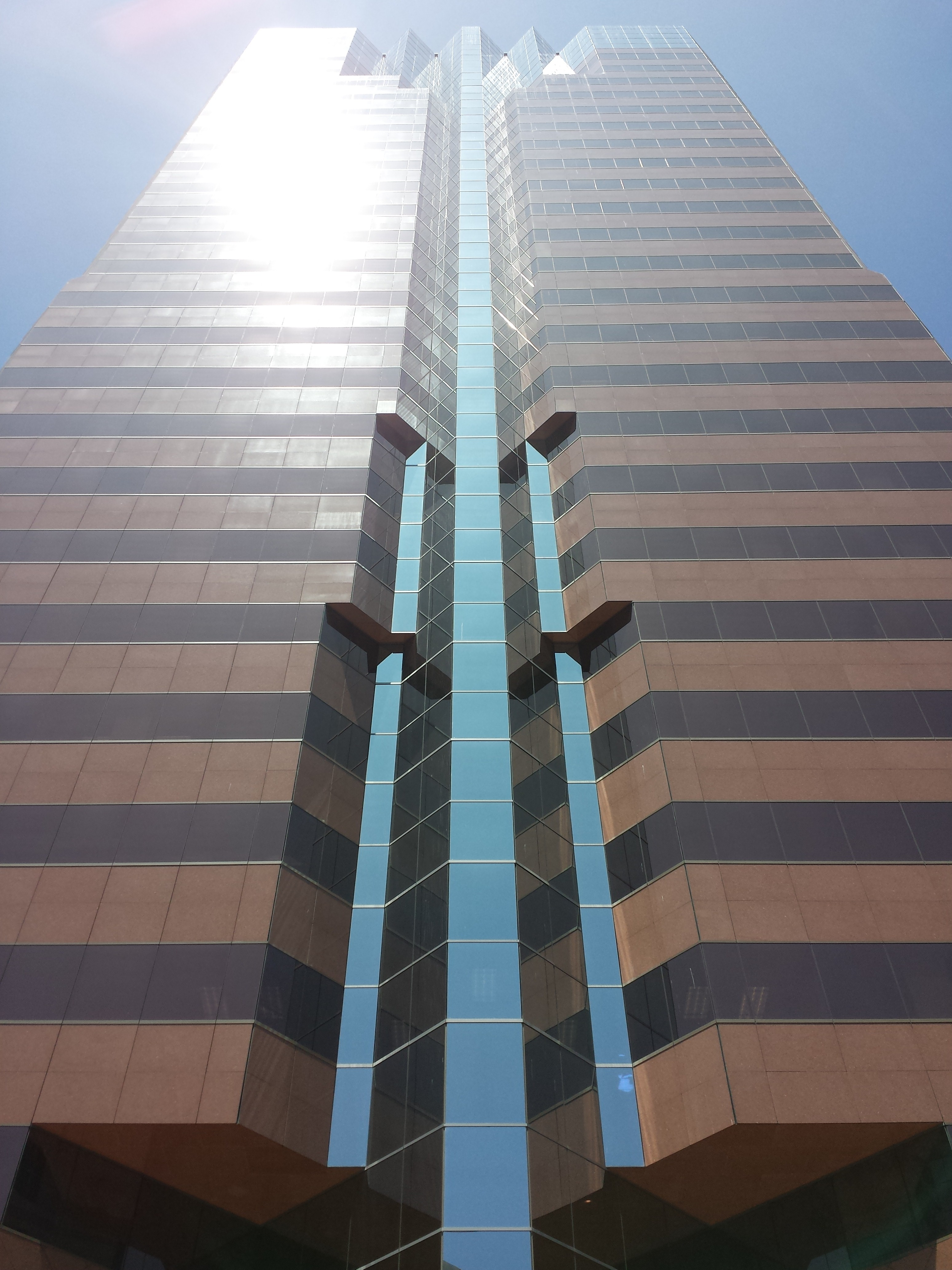
- One World Trade Center in Long Beach, California, seen from Ocean Boulevard level
- Interactive map of the One World Trade Center area

General information
- Status: Completed
- Type: Office
- Location: One World Trade Center; Long Beach, California,
- Coordinates: 33.7679°N 118.1998°W
- Owner: Stillwater Investment Group

Height
- Roof: 121.1 m (397 ft)

Technical details
- Floor count: 27
- Floor area: 558,098 ft^{2} (51,849.0 m^{2})

Design and construction
- Architects: Wou & Partners; Hammel, Green and Abrahamson
- Developer: Kajima U.S.
- Structural engineer: John A Martin & Associates

One World Trade Center is a 27-story office building located in Downtown Long Beach, California. The building was completed in 1989 and is 397 feet (121 meters) high, making it the tallest building in Long Beach from 1989 to 2021 when it was passed by the Shoreline Gateway Tower. The 20-story Hilton Long Beach (opened in 1992) is part of the complex and known as Two World Trade Center. There is a helipad located on top of the building known as the World Trade Center Heliport (FAA: 3CL3).

The building is clad in granite.

In 2024, the parking lot on the east side of One World Trade Center building was closed down to prepare for the construction of a new tower.

== Location ==
One World Trade Center is on Ocean Blvd. It is in the western part of the Long Beach skyline. It is located 20 miles south of downtown Los Angeles.

== Gallery ==
One World Trade Center in Long Beach, California
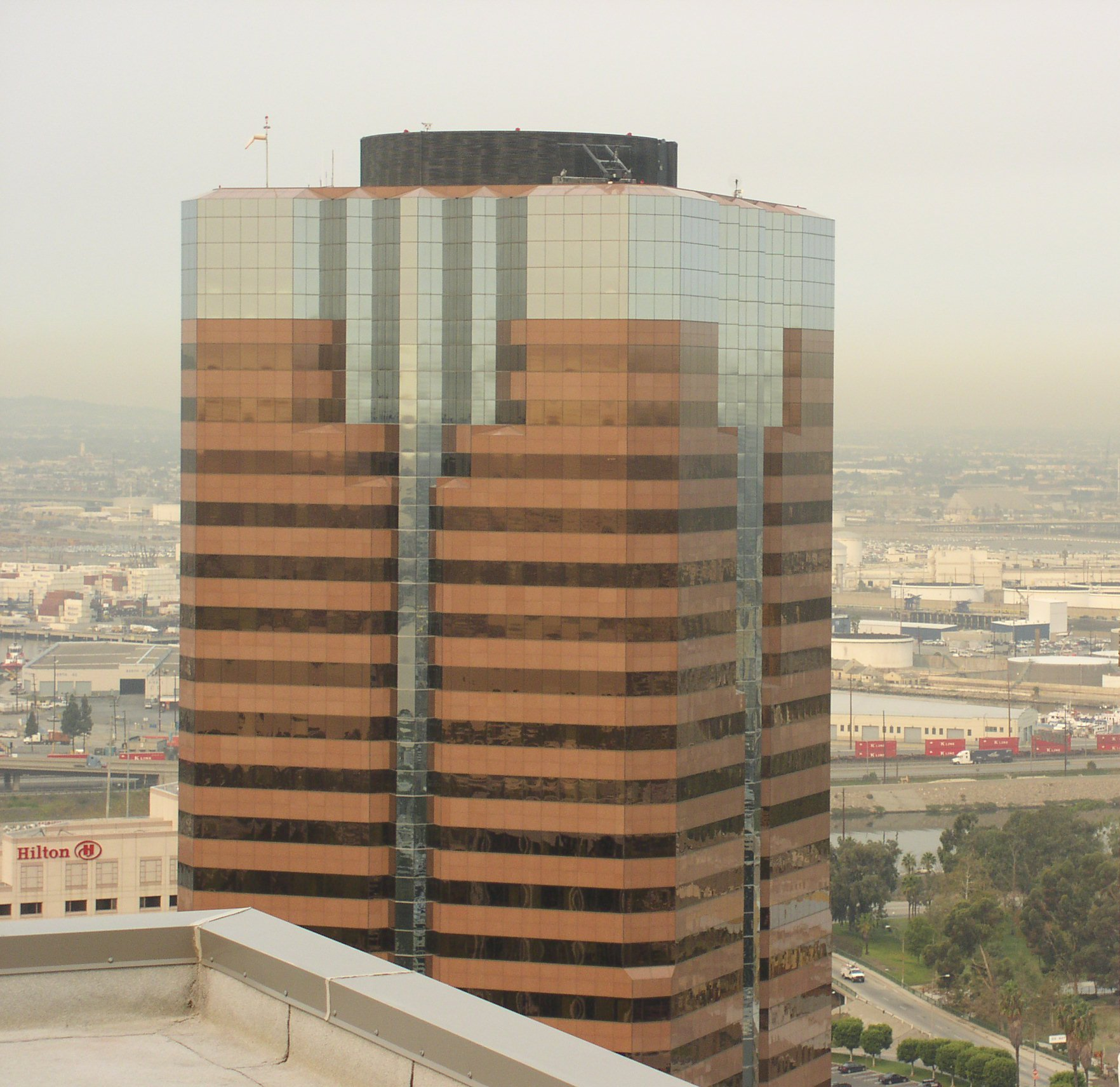
One World Trade Center seen from a nearby skyscraper.

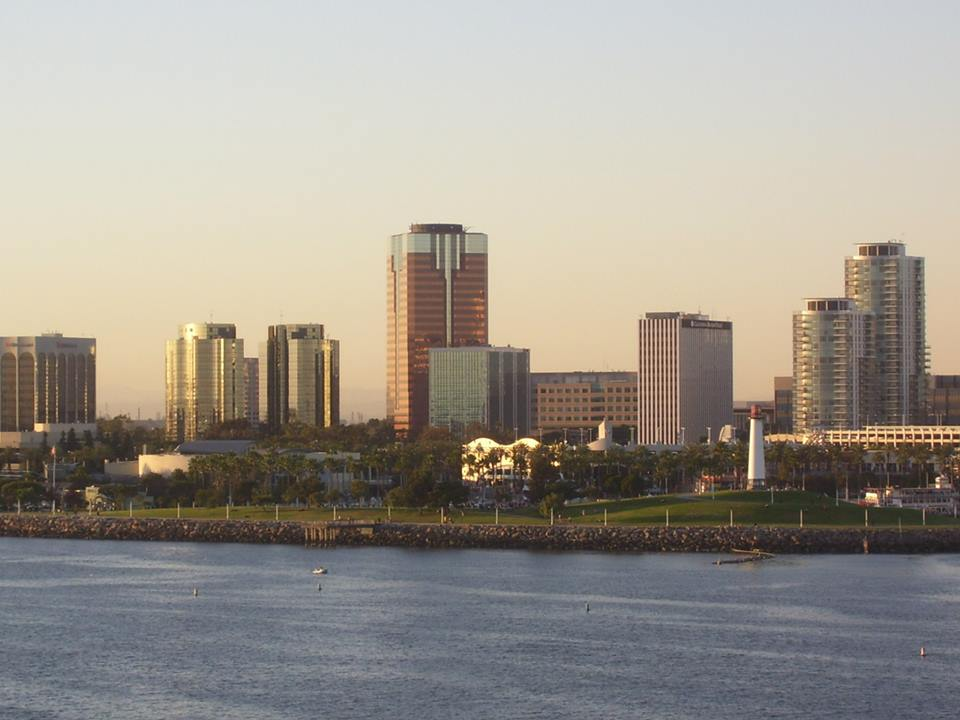
One World Trade Center seen from the Queen Mary

== See also ==
- List of tallest buildings in Long Beach
