= Bergen International Film Festival =

Annual film festival in Bergen, Norway

Coordinates: 60°23′29.4″N 5°19′6.9″E

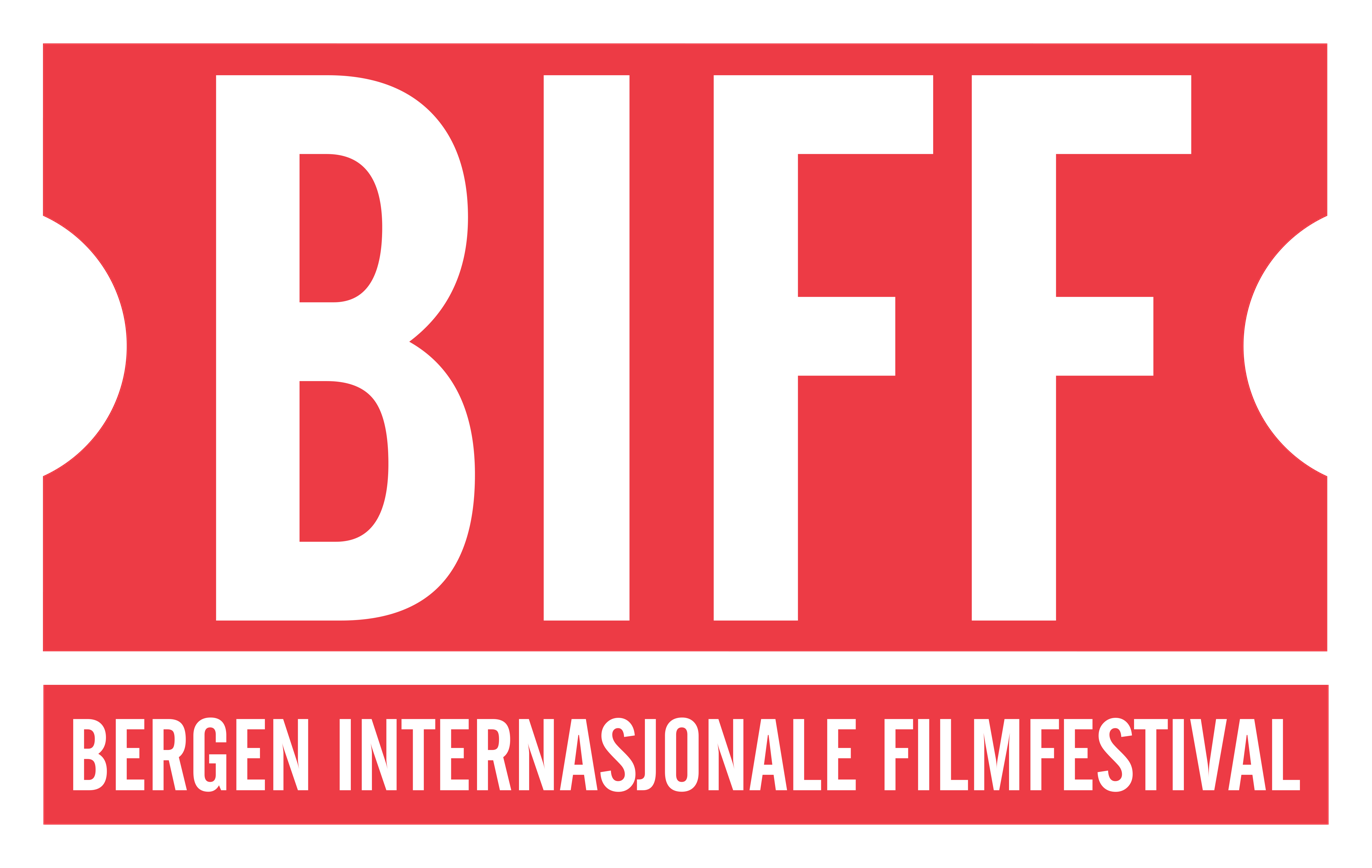
- Location: Bergen, Norway
- Founded: 2000
- Language: Norwegian, English
- Website: biff.no

The Bergen International Film Festival (BIFF) is a film festival held annually in October in Bergen, Norway since 2000, and is the largest film festival in the nation in number of films. The festival celebrated its 20th edition in 2019, featuring more than 150 films in the program. The festival leader is Tor Fosse, and BIFF is owned by Bergen Cinema.

The festival´s main venue is Bergen Cinema's Magnus Barefoot Cinema Centre, with additional screenings taking place at the local art film theatre Cinemateket at Georgernes Verft and at the student cinema at Kvarteret.

== History ==
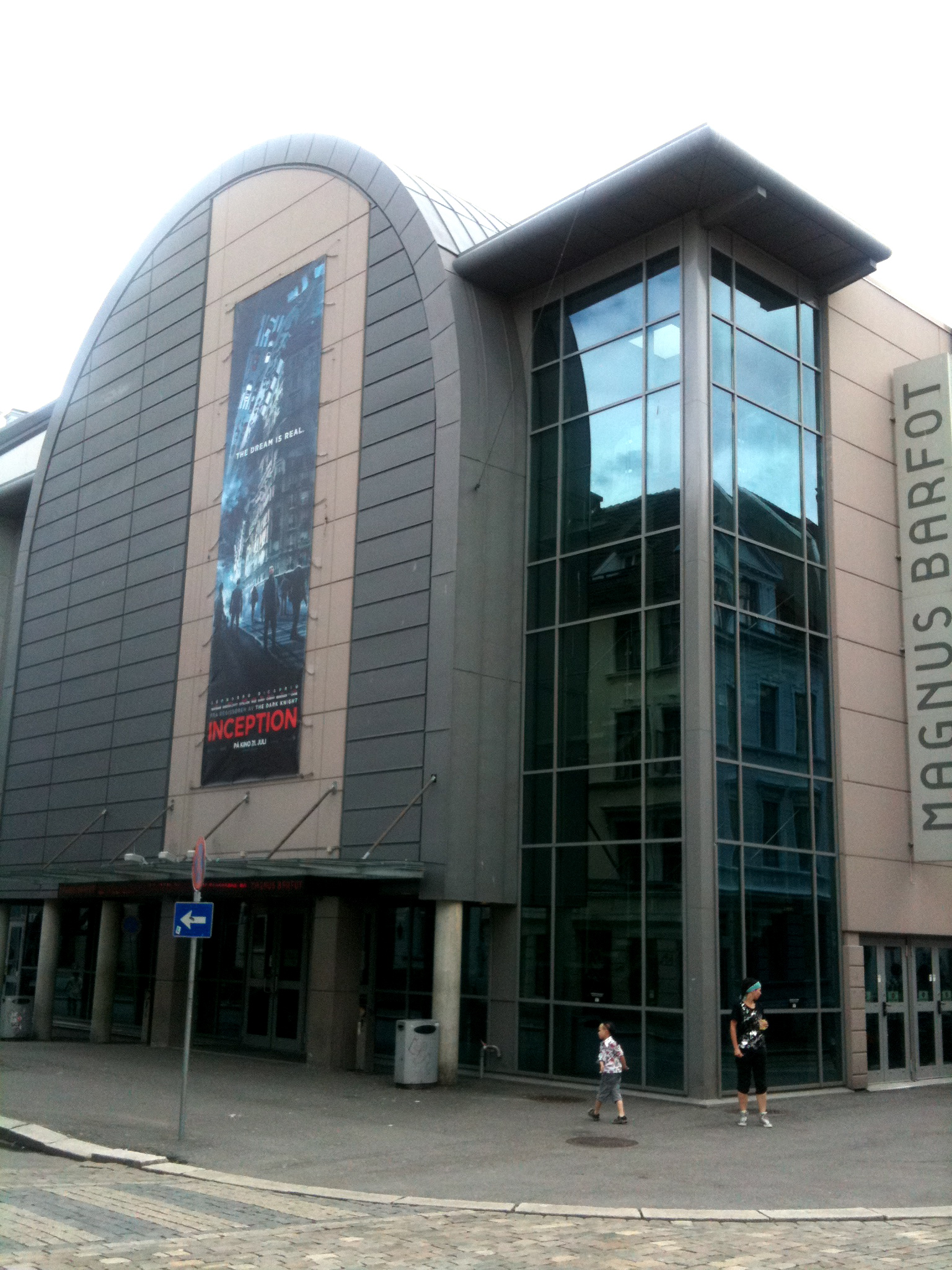
The Magnus Barefoot Cinema Centre i Bergen, the main venue of BIFF.

In 2000, Bergen was a European Capital of Culture. Due to the occasion, Bergen Cinema arranged Bergen International Film Festival, with the most important films from the festival circuit of the year and many sneak previews of movies already picked up for Norwegian distribution. BIFF was one of the most successful events to take place during the celebration of the Cultural City, and was arranged again the year after.

Over the years the festival has grown to become the biggest film festival in Norway, with more than 150 films and 60,000 admissions in 2019.

== Programmes ==
Bergen International Film Festival is organised in various sections:

- Cinema Extraordinaire, the main international competition program of fiction films.
- Documentaire Extraordinaire, the main international competition program of documentary films.
- Checkpoints, a competition program consisting of documentaries focusing on human rights, in collaboration with the Rafto Foundation for Human Rights. Since 2010, a jury has selected a winner, where the prize is awarded to the organization or cause depicted in the film.
- The Golden Owl, a competition program consisting of documentaries focusing on the dissemination of science and research, in collaboration with the University of Bergen.
- Norwegian Documentary Program, with competition programs for best Norwegian documentary and best Norwegian short documentary.
- Norwegian Short Film Competition, a competition program of best Norwegian short fiction film.
- Norwegian Music Video Competition, a competition program of best Norwegian music video.

== BIFF and education ==
Bergen International Film Festival has an extensive program for high school and junior high school students in Bergen. BIFFs offers schools in the area to participate in two different programs:

=== BIFF for Schools ===
The festival offers free showing of documentaries that covers important subjects in history, democracy and human rights. BIFF also tries to bring filmmakers and even the characters the films portray to the screenings, making it possible for the students to converse with the talent afterwards. In 2010, former mayors of Bogotá, Antanas Mockus and Enrique Peñalosa held strong appeals to students of the power of local democracy after the showings of Bogota Change.

=== The School Film Festival ===
BIFF also offers a crash course film school for junior high schools, with professional filmmakers holding seminars. The festival then make camera and editing stations available for the students, and award one school each year for best student film.

== Audience Numbers ==
Audience numbers
Year	Admissions
2000	9,000
2001	23,000
2002	25,000
2003	30,500
2004	33,800
2005	33,500
2006	37,400
2007	39,780
2008	43,700
2009	44,059
2010	44,582
2011	50,788
2012	50,385
2013	53,333
2014	56,302
2015	57,292
2016	64,246
2017	63,840
2018	68,500
2019	61,073
2020	31,014
2021	48,455

== Awards at Bergen International Film Festival ==
=== Cinema Extraordinare ===
The main award at the Bergen International Film Festival is presented to the best feature film. It was awarded from 2000 to 2010 and again since 2016. The award has had its current name since 2007. From 2000 to 2005 it was called The Jury's Award, and in 2006 to 2007 it was named The Norwegian Film Institute's Import Award, which included Norwegian distribution as part of the prize.

- 2000: Luna Papa, directed by Bakhtyar Khudojnazarov Tajikistan
- 2001: Lagaan, directed by Ashutosh Gowariker India
- 2002: Dog Days, directed by Ulrich Seidl Austria
- 2003: Blind Shaft, directed by Li Yang China
- 2004: Mysterious Skin, directed by Gregg Araki United States
- 2005: Frozen Land, directed by Aku Louhimies Finland
- 2006: The Minder, directed by Rodrigo Moreno Argentina
- 2007: Silent Light, directed by Carlos Reygadas Mexico
- 2008: The World is Big and Salvation Lurks Around the Corner, directed by Stefan Komandarev Bulgaria
- 2009: No One's Son, directed by Arsen Anton Ostojić Croatia
- 2010: Le Quattro Volte, directed by Michelangelo Frammatino Italy
- 2016: House of others, directed by Rusudan Glurjidze Georgia Croatia Russia Spain
- 2017: A Ciambra, directed by Jonas Carpignano Italy
- 2018: Ayka, directed by Sergei Dvortsevoy Germany Chile Russia Kazakhstan Poland
- 2019: House of Hummingbird, directed by Bora Kim South Korea and La Llorona, directed by Jayro Bustamante Guatemala France
- 2020: The Trouble With Being Born, directed by Sandra Wollner Austria Germany
- 2021: Sundown, directed by Michel Franco Mexico Sweden France
- 2022: The Five Devils, directed by Léa Mysius France
- 2023: All Dirt Roads Taste of Salt, directed by Raven Jackson United States
- 2024: On Becoming a Guinea Fowl, directed by Rungano Nyoni Ireland United Kingdom United States Zambia

=== Best International Documentary/Documentaire Extraordinaire ===
Awarded since 2004. The prize is 30,000 NOK, since 2013 awarded by NRK.

- 2004: The Master and His Pupil, directed by Sonia Herman Dolz Netherlands
- 2005: The Boys of Baraka, directed by Heidi Ewing and Rachel Grady United States
- 2006: God Grew Tired of Us, directed by Christopher Dillon Quinn United States
- 2007: Forever, directed by Heddy Honigmann Netherlands
- 2008: War Child, directed by Christian Karim Chrobog United States
- 2009: Afghan Star, directed by Havana Marking United Kingdom
- 2010: The Autobiography of Nicolae Ceausescu, directed by Andrei Ujică Romania
- 2011: Buck, directed by Cindy Meehl United States
- 2012:
- 2013: The Unknown Known, directed by Errol Morris United States
- 2014: Waiting for August, directed by Teodora Ana Mihai Belgium Romania
- 2015: Pervert Park, directed by Frida Barkfors and Lasse Barkfors Denmark Sweden United States
- 2016: Brothers of the Night, directed by Patric Chiha Austria
- 2017: Makala, directed by Emmanuel Gras France
- 2018: Minding the Gap, directed by Bing Liu United States
- 2019: Midnight Family, directed by Luke Lorentzen United States Mexico
- 2020: The Wall of Shadows, directed by Eliza Kubarska Germany Switzerland Poland
- 2021: Ascension, directed by Jessica Kingdon United States China
- 2022: Crows Are White, directed by Ahseen Nadeem United States
- 2023: The Mother of All Lies, directed by Asmae El Moudir Morocco Egypt Qatar Saudi Arabia
- 2024: Soundtrack to a Coup D'Etat, directed by Johan Grimonprez Belgium Netherlands France

=== Best Norwegian Documentary ===
Awarded since 2011. The prize is awarded by NRK.

- 2011: Folk ved fjorden, directed by Øyvind Sandberg
- 2012: De andre, directed by Margreth Olin
- 2013: Banaz A Love Story, directed by Deeyah Khan
- 2014: Drone, directed by Tonje Hessen Schei
- 2015: Voldtatt, directed by Linda Steinhoff
- 2016: Barneraneren, directed by Jon Haukeland
- 2017: Nowhere to Hide, directed by Zaradasht Ahmed
- 2018: For vi er gutta, directed by Petter Sommer, Jo Vemund Svendsen
- 2019: Descent into the Maelstrom, directed by Jan Vardøen
- 2020: Odelsgut og Fantefølge, directed by Merethe Offerdal Tveit
- 2021: Sommerbarna, directed by Linn Helene Løken
- 2022: Hidden Letters, directed by Violet Du Feng & Zhao Qing
- 2023: Mammaen i Meg, directed by Hilde Merete Haug
- 2024: Pet Farm, directed by Finn & Martin Walther

=== Checkpoints ===
Awarded since 2010 and one of the main prizes at BIFF, selected by a jury from a competition program consisting of films focusing on human rights.

- 2010: Budrus, directed by Julia Bacha Israel
- 2011: The Last Mountain, directed by Bill Haney United States
- 2012: Sons of the Clouds: The Last Colony, directed by Alvaro Longoria Spain
- 2013: The Act of Killing, directed by J. Oppenheimer Indonesia
- 2014: Drone (2014 film), directed by Tonje Hessen Schei Norway
- 2015: The Hunting Ground, directed by Kirby Dick United States
- 2016: The War Show, directed by Obaidah Zytoon and Andreas M. Dalsgaard United States
- 2017: Radio Kobani, directed by Reber Dosky Netherlands
- 2018: Laila at the Bridge, directed by Elizabeth and Gulistan Mirzaei Canada Afghanistan
- 2019: For Sama, directed by Waad Al-Khateab and Edward Watts United Kingdom Syria
- 2020: Welcome to Chechnya, directed by David France United States
- 2021: Writing With Fire, directed by Rintu Thomas and Sushmit Gosh India
- 2022: The Killing of a Journalist, directed by Matt Sarnecki Czech Republic Denmark United States
- 2023: Name Me Lawand, directed by Edward Lovelace United Kingdom
- 2024: The Sky Above Zenica, directed by Nanna Frank Møller and Zlatko Pranjic Denmark Bosnia and Herzegovina

=== The Golden Owl ===
Awarded by the University of Bergen since 2014 to the best science documentary, selected by a jury.

- 2014: How I Came to Hate Math, directed by Olivier Peyon France
- 2015: Ice and the Sky, directed by Luc Jacquet France
- 2016: Monster in the mind, directed by Jean Carper United States
- 2017: Let There Be Light, directed by Mila Aung-Thwin, Van Royko Canada
- 2018: The Serengeti Rules, directed by Nicholas Brown United States
- 2019: Jim Allison: Breakthrough, directed by Bill Haney United States
- 2020: Lost in Face, directed by Valentin Riedl Germany
- 2021: The Hunt for Planet B, directed by Nathaniel Kahn United States
- 2022: Framing Agnes, directed by Chase Joynt Canada United States
- 2023: El Equipo, directed by Bernardo Ruiz United States
- 2024: Archive of the Future, directed by Joerg Burger United States

=== Best Norwegian Short Film ===
Awarded since 2004.

- 2003: Fear Less, directed by Therese Jacobsen
- 2004: The Bible, directed by Bjørn Amundlien
- 2005: Drømme kan du gjøre senere, directed by Thomas A. Østbye
- 2006: Drømmehuset, directed by Øystein Mamen
- 2007: Bo jo cie kochom (Fordi jeg elsker deg), directed by Gine Therese Grønner
- 2008: Ekornet, directed by Stian Einar Forgaard
- 2009: Skylappjenta, directed by Iram Haq
- 2010: Jenny, directed by Ingvild Søderlind
- 2011: Asyl, directed by Jørn Utkilen
- 2012: Å vokte fjellet, directed by Izer Aliu
- 2013: Money Back Please, directed by Even Hafnor
- 2014: Ja vi elsker, directed by Hallvar Witzø
- 2015: Small Talk, directed by Even Hafnor
- 2016: The Committee, directed by Gunnhild Enger
- 2017: No Man is an Island, directed by Ali Parandian
- 2018: Kulturen, directed by Ernst De Geer
- 2019: Fun Factory, directed by Even Hafnor, Lisa Brooke Hansen
- 2020: Papapa, directed by Kerren Lumer-Klabbers
- 2021: Stikk, directed by Tobias Klemeyer Smith
- 2022: Portør, directed by Lisa Enes
- 2023: Grill, directed by Jade Hærem Aksnes
- 2024: Velkommen Hjem, directed by Amanda Nalbant Nordpoll

=== Best Norwegian Short Documentary ===
Awarded since 2011. Awarded by VGTV.

- 2011: Selger 327, directed by Kari Anne Moe
- 2012: Havets sølv, directed by Are Pilskog
- 2013: Du velger selv, directed by Kajsa Næss
- 2014: Dette er Kabul, directed by Sadaf Fetrat, Sahar Fetrat, Nargis Azaryun, Anders Sømme Hammer and Christoffer Næss
- 2015: Asylbarna: Farida, directed by Ragnhild Sørheim og Christer Fasmer
- 2016: Boys, directed by Sunniva Sundby
- 2017: I det fri, directed by Edvard Karijord, Bendik Mondal
- 2018: The Future of Iraq, directed by Thee Yezen Al-Obaide, Mats Muri
- 2019: Filmen om Farmor, directed by Anine Wiesner Barg
- 2020: Greetings From Myanmar, directed by Sunniva Sundby, Andreas J. Riiser
- 2021: Skolen ved Havet, directed by Solveig Melkeraaen
- 2022: Wherever I Look, directed by Emilie Adelina Monies
- 2023: Siste Kapittel, directed by Frøydis Fossli Moe
- 2024: Behind the Mask, directed by Håvard Bustnes

=== Best Norwegian Music Video ===
Awarded 2017-2020. Replaced Best Scandinavian Music Video.

- 2017: Daniel Kvammen feat. Lars Vaular - "Som om Himmelen Revna", directed by Eivind Landsvik
- 2018: Hanne Hukkelberg feat. Emilie Nicolas - "Embroidery", directed by Alam Ali
- 2019: Teddy and the Love Gang - "Nozomi", directed by Håvard Glad
- 2020: The Musical Slave - "They can´t stop you", directed by Kristin Vollset
- 2021: Ane Brun - "Crumbs", directed by Stian Andersen
- 2022: Gundelach - "Golden", directed by Fredrik Harper
- 2023: Rick Grove - "Blur", directed by Elliot Houwing-Endresen
- 2024: Honningbarna- "Avanti", directed by Sander Dahl

=== The Audience Award ===
- 2000: Crouching Tiger, Hidden Dragon, directed by Ang Lee China
- 2001: Das Experiment, directed by Oliver Hirschbiegel Germany
- 2002: Bowling for Columbine, directed by Michael Moore United States
- 2003: Kill Bill Vol. 1, directed by Quentin Tarantino United States
- 2004: Oldboy, directed by Park Chan-wook South Korea
- 2005: Sirkel, directed by Aleksander Nordaas Norway
- 2006: The Queen, directed by Stephen Frears United Kingdom
- 2007: Fashion Victims, directed by Ingo Rasper Germany
- 2008: Young@Heart, directed by Stephen Walker United Kingdom
- 2009: Bring Children from Streets, directed by Espen Faugstad and Eivind Nilsen Norway
- 2010: World Peace and Other 4th Grade Achievements, directed by Chris Farina United States
- 2011: Bully, directed by Lee Hirsch United States
- 2012: Beasts of the Southern Wild, directed by Benh Zeitlin United States
- 2013: Siblings are forever, directed by Frode Fimland Norway
- 2014: Good Girl, directed by Solveig Melkeraaen Norway
- 2015: Raped, directed by Linda Steinhoff Norway
- 2016: The Handmaiden, directed by Park Chan-wook South Korea
- 2017: Call Me By Your Name, directed by Luca Guadagnino Italy
- 2018: En affære, directed by Henrik Martin Dahlsbakken Norway
- 2019: Woman, directed by Yann Arthus-Bertrand, Anastasia Mikova France

=== Youth Jury's Documentary Award ===
A prize awarded since 2004 by a jury consisting of high school students that choose from the films that is a part of the BIFF for Schools program.

- 2004: Outfoxed: Rupert Murdoch's War on Journalism, directed by Robert Greenwald United States
- 2005: Lost Children, directed by Oliver Stoltz Germany
- 2006: A Crude Awakening: The Oil Crash, directed by Basil Gelpke and Ray McCormack Switzerland
- 2007: Sharkwater, directed by Rob Stewart Canada
- 2008: Yodok Stories, directed by Andrzej Fidyk Norway
- 2009: The Cove, directed by Louie Psihoyos United States
- 2010: Bogota Change, directed by Andreas Møl Dalsgaard Denmark
- 2011: Bully, directed by Lee Hirsch United States
- 2012: 5 Broken Cameras, directed by Emad Burnat & Guy Davidi Palestine
- 2013: The Human Scale, directed by Andreas Dalsgaard Denmark
- 2014: We Are the Giant, directed by Greg Barker United States
- 2015: The Mask You Live In, directed by Jennifer Siebel Newsom United States
- 2016: The Crossing, directed by George Kurian Norway
- 2017: Plastic China, directed by Jiuliang Wang Chile
- 2018: Silvana film), directed by Mika Gustafson, Olivia Kastebring, Christina Tsiobanelis Sweden
- 2019: Drag Kids, directed by Megan Wennberg Canada
- 2020: Vinden Snur, directed by Kieran Kolle Norway
- 2021: Faceless, directed by Jennifer Ngo United States Canada
- 2022: The Territory, directed by Alex Pritz United States Denmark Brazil
- 2023: Name Me Lawand, directed by Edward Lovelace United Kingdom
- 2024: Igualada, directed by Juan Mejía Botero Colombia United States Mexico

=== Young Talent Award ===
A cash prize awarded from Vestnorsk Filmsenter since 2005.

- 2005: Aleksander Nordaas
- 2006: Morvary Samaré and Astrid Schau-Larsen
- 2007: Tor Kristian Liseth
- 2008: Olav Øyehaug
- 2009: Espen Faugstad and Eivind Nilsen
- 2010: Kedy Hassani
- 2011: Frida Eggum Michaelsen
- 2012: Are Pilskog
- 2013: Mads Andersen
- 2014: Kjell Mathiesen
- 2015: Hildegunn Wærness
- 2016: David Alræk
- 2017: Arne Daniel Storevold Haldorsen
- 2018: Thorvald Nilsen
- 2019: Unknown
- 2020: Selim Mutic
- 2021: Benjamin Garcia Langeland
- 2022: Mathilde Meraki Ypsøy
- 2023: Sivert Kalvø Harang og Christer Steffensen
- 2024: Birk Øren

=== Best Scandinavian Music Video (discontinued) ===
Awarded 2010-2013.

- 2010: Torgny - "The Only Game", directed by Emil Trier Norway
- 2011: Who Made Who - "Every Minute Alone", directed by William Stahl Denmark
- 2012: Todd Terje - "Inspector Norse", directed by Kristoffer Borgli Norway
- 2013: The Knife - a Tooth for an Eye, Sweden

=== The Critic's Award (discontinued) ===
Only awarded once, by the film journalists attending the festival in 2003.

- 2003: A Good Lawyer's Wife, directed by Im Sang-soo South Korea

== The Festival by year ==
- 2003 Bergen International Film Festival
- 2009 Bergen International Film Festival
- 2010 Bergen International Film Festival
