= List of films featuring surveillance =

There is a significant body of films that feature surveillance as a theme or as a plot arc. These are a number of these films produced in the United States and other countries.

== List of films ==
Film	Year	Description
1971	2014	The documentary features the Citizens' Commission to Investigate the FBI and how it broke into a satellite FBI office. The group discovered and released documents about COINTELPRO, a secret domestic surveillance program that targeted "dissident groups, civil rights leaders and anti-Vietnam War activists".
2001: A Space Odyssey	1968	During the Jupiter Mission chapter of the film, the HAL 9000 artificial intelligence maintains total surveillance of the spacecraft, including visual surveillance, monitoring the psychology of the crew, and lipreading.
Traffic in Souls	1913	Criminals use a wired intercom and a tablet that duplicates what's written on it on a similar device in another room. The film's heroes use a wired remote mic and wax cylinder-based recording device set up in a neighbouring room to incriminate the conspirators.
1984	1956	The film is set in a totalitarian society in the future where the population may be monitored at any time.
23	1998	Hackers sell their research to Russians, but because the Russians want military data instead, the hackers have to elude them.
Aelita: Queen of Mars	1924	Surveillance is used by the upper class to oversee the working class.
American Pie	1999	The teenage protagonist setting up his webcam so his friends can see a girl changing clothes. The webcast is shared publicly to his peers.
The Anderson Tapes	1971	Burglars use a luxury apartment's surveillance technology to break in but are unaware of being under surveillance themselves.
Anon	2018	Set in a futuristic world where privacy and anonymity no longer exist, the plot follows a troubled detective who comes across a young woman who has evaded the government's transparency system.
Another Stakeout	1993	Sequel to Stakeout. Two police detectives and an assistant district attorney surveil a home looking for a missing witness in a Mafia case.
Antitrust	2001	The protagonist learns that his company has an extensive surveillance system to observe and steal code.
Bad Times at the El Royale	2018	Circa 1968, several strangers, most with a secret to bury, meet by chance at Lake Tahoe's El Royale, a rundown hotel with a dark past, including a widespread secret surveillance activity of rooms occupied by guests.
Bedroom Eyes	1984	An avid jogger finds a prime voyeurism spot on his nightly route; then witnesses a murder.
Blow Out	1981	A sound technician inadvertently records a murder and learns that it is part of ongoing political corruption.
Blowup	1966	A fashion photographer unwittingly takes photographs of a murder and investigates the circumstances.
Blue Thunder	1983	The film features a military helicopter with high-tech surveillance equipment.
Body Double	1984	The protagonist, staying at a friend's apartment, is able to spy on the neighbor but winds up witnessing her murder.
The Bourne Identity	2002	Amnesiac spy Jason Bourne eludes people from his program trying to track him down.
The Bourne Supremacy	2004	Amnesiac spy Jason Bourne eludes people from his program trying to track him down.
The Bourne Ultimatum	2007	Amnesiac spy Jason Bourne eludes people from his program trying to track him down.
Brazil	1985	The science fiction fantasy film follows a government clerk who works for a totalitarian and bureaucratic government of Orwellian proportions.
The Cabin in the Woods	2012	A group of college students who retreat to a remote forest cabin where they fall victim to backwoods zombies, and two scientists who manipulate the ongoing events from an underground facility.
Caché	2005	A couple finds on their front porch videotapes of them in their home and tries to find out who is recording them.
Cape Fear	1962	A released criminal follows the family of the man who testified against him.
Captain America: The Winter Soldier	2014	The superhero Captain America, resurrected in the 21st century, combats a conspiracy in the surveillance state of his country.
The Circle	2017	A powerful Internet company attempts to create a utopian society by deploying widespread surveillance accessible to all.
Citizenfour	2014	The documentary features Edward Snowden and his initiation of global surveillance disclosures in 2013, documenting events that first took place in Hong Kong at a clandestine meeting between Snowden and journalist Glenn Greenwald.
Closed Circuit	2013	A pair of lawyers in Great Britain discover "an unsavory alliance" between its secret service and the criminal justice system and have to evade the surveillance state.
Code 46	2003	In the near future, personal travel between countries is limited and controlled by technological means, but counterfeiting allows circumvention of these controls.
Cold Eyes	2013	A South Korean surveillance unit attempts to track down a criminal leader in Seoul.
Colossus: The Forbin Project	1970	A supercomputer created for running the defense systems of the United States becomes sentient and assumes total control. It begins placing all citizens under surveillance, starting with its creator.
Confessions of a Nazi Spy	1939	A Nazi spy ring in the United States is tracked and disrupted by an FBI agent played by Edward G. Robinson in the years just before the outbreak of World War II.
The Conversation	1974	A surveillance expert is hired to combine wiretapped recordings of a couple and tries to interpret their conversations.
The Dark Knight	2008	The vigilante superhero Batman hacks every cell phone in Gotham City to set up a sonar system to find the criminal the Joker.
Death in the Terminal	2016	A reconstruction in so-called Rashomon style, with several eyewitnesses offering their own perspectives on a single tragic event, a terror attack in the Beer Sheva bus station after which a bystander assumed to be the perpetrator was lynched.
Death Watch	1980	In the future, the protagonist has a camera implanted in his brain and is enlisted to probe a dying woman's subconscious.
Déjà Vu	2006	A detective tries to save a woman's life by utilizing advanced surveillance equipment.
Demolition Man	1993	The science fiction film depicts a 2032 "San Angeles" where everyone's behavior is under surveillance.
The Den	2013	In the found-footage horror film, a teenage girl witnesses a murder via webcam, and the killer tracks her down. The film is shown through different screens including that of surveillance cameras.
Disturbia	2007	A teenager under house arrest spies on his neighbor and suspects him of being a killer.
Eagle Eye	2008	Two strangers meet via a strange phone call and are then tracked by someone using everyday technology.
Echelon Conspiracy	2009	An American engineer gets a cell phone that gives him unlimited wealth, but he is then pursued by security agents.
EDtv	1999	Ed is a video store clerk whose daily life is broadcast by a company trying to save its cable channel.
The End of Violence	1997	A film producer is targeted to keep secret a satellite surveillance program to combat crime.
Enemy of the State	1998	The main character is pursued by the National Security Agency, which uses an array of surveillance technologies.
Equilibrium	2002	In a futuristic city where emotions are suppressed through surveillance and control, a law enforcement officer begins experiencing emotions himself.
Das Experiment	2001	A journalist joins a curious psychological experiment and records the experiment in secret.
Eye in the Sky (2007)	2007	In Hong Kong, a police surveillance unit monitors a master criminal without realizing the criminal is watching them as well.
Eye in the Sky (2016)	2016	Complications arise when a British lieutenant general (Alan Rickman) and a colonel (Helen Mirren) order a drone missile strike to take out a group of terrorists in Nairobi, Kenya.
Eyeborgs	2009	In the United States, the "Freedom of Observation Act" is passed allowing for the creation of ODIN (Optical Defense Intelligence Network). This leads to "eyeborgs" being created, a mobile camera drone administered by the Department for Homeland Security.
The Final Cut	2004	An editor cuts together footage from a device implanted in one's body that can record an entire life, and he finds footage that has a connection with his own past.
Firewall	2006	A technology executive is coerced to rob a bank by criminals holding his family hostage.
Fortress	1993	The science fiction film follows a couple with an illegal second child through a panopticonal society.
The Fortune Cookie	1966	A private eye secretly films a man who is feigning an injury in an attempt to collect a large amount of money through a lawsuit.
Freeze Frame	2004	The protagonist is acquitted from the wrongful accusation of killing a woman and her twin daughters, but due to the media's portrayal, he maintains video surveillance of his own life to ensure having an alibi.
Furious 7	2015	In this Fast and Furious action film series, a team of drivers tracks down a hacker to recover a surveillance device called God's Eye that can locate anyone in the world within seconds.
Gattaca	1997	In the near future, an aspiring astronaut uses a cover identity in training and has to evade genetic screenings used as a surveillance mechanism.
Giant	2009	A security guard at a supermarket watches a cleaning woman through video surveillance and begins stalking her outside work.
Hackers	1995	A group of hackers break into a company's supercomputer and have to evade the U.S. Secret Service.
Halloween: Resurrection	2002	A group of college students are trapped inside a home with a serial killer, and the killer broadcasts the subsequent events online through multiple cameras.
Headhunters	2011	High-tech surveillance is used in a showdown between a headhunter who moonlights as an art thief and a potential recruit with a military background.
Hey Arnold! The Movie	2002	Surveillance cameras are mounted everywhere in the villain's homebase to stop potential intruders from stealing the document, but they come in handy later when the villain is caught by said cameras burning the document in front of Arnold and Gerald.
Hi, Mom!	1970	A Vietnam War veteran attempts to make "peep art" by filming people who live across from his apartment building.
iHuman	2019	A documentary by Tonje Hessen Schei presenting a wide range of views on AI and society.
I Love You All (Aus Liebe Zum Volk)	2004	This is a film about surveillance and blindness, about faith and disillusion.
Infernal Affairs	2002	A cop works undercover in a triad, and a triad member works undercover in the police department. Each is ordered to track down the mole in the very organization he infiltrated.
Jason Bourne	2016	Amnesiac spy Jason Bourne eludes people from his program trying to track him down.
The Listening	2006	An art gallery employee discovers a briefcase of classified documents about surveillance technology made by one of the NSA's suppliers, and the supplier goes after her to protect its secrets. A NSA operative blows his cover to protect the woman.
The Lives of Others	2006	In East Germany in the 1980s, a Stasi officer spies on a playwright.
Logan's Run	1976	Citizens of a futuristic city are controlled by the use of a crystal on their right palm
Lost Highway	1997	In part of the film, a couple receives videotapes recording the outside then the inside of their home.
Look	2007	The film shows surveillance camera footage of events surrounding San Fernando Valley denizens.
Loving	1970	George Segal as a philandering husband trysts with a pick-up in a child's playhouse in the back yard of the upscale house where he and his wife are attending a party, unaware that a group of men are watching with interest over a closed circuit TV monitor.
M	1931	A city in pursuit of a child murderer has both cops and criminals engaging in surveillance and snooping on one another.
The Manchurian Candidate	2004	The film is a political thriller about a soldier who has been subjected to manipulation of his mental states and brain functions such that he becomes part of a corporate-backed political conspiracy, featuring themes of intense surveillance and manipulation.
Meine Daten und ich	2009	Mix of feature and documentary film that discusses surveillance policies in Germany in interviews with members of parliament and experts.
Menace II Society	1993	A shopkeeper keeps close surveillance on two young black men.
Mercury Rising	1998	A 9 year old autistic boy is being hunted by the NSA
Metropolis	1927	The master of the city, Fredersen, keeps close surveillance on the city's workers.
Mimic 3: Sentinel	2003	Environmentally hypersensitive Marvin spends his days taking pictures of his neighbors from his window.
Minority Report	2002	The science fiction film depicts a futuristic society under total surveillance.
Modern Times	1936	A factory worker is demented by the sped-up assembly line and the constant video surveillance.
My Little Eye	2002	In the horror film, five twentysomethings live together to win a prize but are subsequently targeted by a serial killer.
The Net	1995	A computer programmer in unknowing possession of secret software is tracked by assailants.
The Net 2.0	2006	A computer technician who takes a job in Istanbul finds herself in pursuit by criminals who try to erase her identity from the Internet.
Network	2019	The debut film of Saptaswa Basu features the theme of surveillance in this modern world. The first Bengali film to deal with a subject like this.
Nineteen Eighty-Four	1984	The film is set in a totalitarian state where citizens are under complete surveillance.
Official Secrets	2019	Film based on the life of whistleblower Katharine Gun who leaked a memo detailing that the US had eavesdropped on diplomats from countries tasked with passing a second UN resolution on the invasion of Iraq.
One Hour Photo	2002	An employee at a photo processing department processes a family's photos and imagines himself to be their uncle.
The Osterman Weekend	1983	A television host allows the CIA to wire his home for video surveillance since his visiting friends are suspected to be spies.
Overheard	2009	The Hong Kong Police Force's Commercial Crime Bureau uses surveillance to monitor for suspected price fixing.
Panic Room	2002	A woman and her daughter use closed-circuit television to follow the movements of criminals invading their home.
The Parallax View	1974	A journalist investigates the assassination of a United States Senator and infiltrates the responsible corporation.
Paranoia	2013	A technology expert infiltrates a company to spy on it, but the company begins to spy on him.
Peeping Tom	1960	A photographer hunts down women and records their reactions as he kills them.
The Perfect Dictatorship	2014	Recordings made by hidden cameras and microphones are used to both expose and perpetuate political corruption in Mexico.
Pi	1998	A mathematician finds out that a new 216 digit number is the key to the stock market and religion and is targeted by several organizations.
The President's Analyst	1967	In the satire film, an analyst for the President of the United States becomes expendable and teams up with two allies. Meanwhile, a telephone company seeks to implant electronic devices in people's brains.
Rear Window	1954	The main character spies on people in his apartment complex and thinks one of them is a murderer.
Red Road	2006	In Scotland, a woman who is paid to watch a dangerous corner of North Glasgow tracks a former criminal and begins stalking him.
The Resident	2011	A recently single woman rents an apartment in New York City and is stalked by her landlord with surveillance equipment.
Le Samouraï	1967	The film's hit man resides in a flat that is bugged by the police who suspects him of being responsible for a contract killing.
A Scanner Darkly	2006	An undercover cop is ordered to spy on his associates as a paranoid government monitors its citizens.
The Secret Cinema	1968	A woman is manipulated by people around her so a director can film her to screen the results in a theater.
Sexmission	1984	Two men wake up from hibernation to witness a 100% female society and discover they are the last men alive.
Sharky's Machine	1981	A detective spies on a high-end prostitute through her apartment windows, develops an attraction and witnesses her murder.
The Simpsons Movie	2007	The Simpsons are on the run from the law, but the National Security Agency is able to eavesdrop and locate them.
Sliver	1993	The main character is spied on by one of her fellow apartment tenants.
Snake Eyes	1998	A homicide detective investigates an assassination attempt at a boxing match.
Sneakers	1992	A team of computer hackers is contracted by the government to steal a code-breaking machine.
Snowden	2016	Oliver Stone's biographical thriller on NSA whistle-blower Edward Snowden.
Sookshmadarshini	2024	In this Malayalam cinema, Priyadarshini, the protagonist housewife investigates the suspicious activities of a new family in the neighborhood.
Spectre	2015	James Bond learns that a villain is responsible for funding the multinational surveillance program for his criminal organization.
Stakeout	1987	Two police detectives are on stakeout watching a waitress whose ex-boyfriend has escaped from prison.
Surveillance	2008	Two FBI agents hunting a serial killer come across a mass shooting in a small town, and they use video surveillance to uncover the truth of the shooting.
Surveillance 24/7	2007	Filmed through surveillance cameras, a teacher takes home a lover and wakes up to find him murdered.
Sweet Bunch	1983	A group of four misfits live together in a house and, disillusioned with life, experiment in crime. They are put under surveillance by the authorities, who wait for a misstep.
Takedown (Track Down)	2000	The story is based on the search for computer hacker Kevin Mitnick.
Thegidi	2014	A Tamil rookie detective sent to collect daily activities of a set of people, soon realizes that people are being killed using details of the surveillance report he submitted. He tries to save the next targets and eventually tries to trace the killer.
Thelma & Louise	1991	Surveillance cameras record Thelma and Louise as they commit crimes.
The Thousand Eyes of Dr. Mabuse	1960	German police investigate unsolved murders at a hotel, which is rigged with a sophisticated TV system.
Three Days of the Condor	1975	The film is about a bookish CIA researcher who comes back from lunch, discovers all his co-workers murdered, and tries to outwit those responsible until he figures out whom he can really trust
THX 1138	1971	The film is set in a dystopian society where citizens are drugged and under surveillance.
Timecode	2000	The experimental film displays a split screen of four cameras following different people in a film production office.
The Truman Show	1998	The main character is unaware that his small-town life is constructed and is recorded 24 hours a day and aired to TV viewers.
V for Vendetta	2005	The film is set in a future England ruled by a totalitarian regime that uses surveillance to monitor the citizens.
Vacancy	2007	A couple staying at a motel begin watching low-budget horror movies available on tape and realize the movies were filmed in their own motel room.
We Live in Public	2009	A film about the internet pioneer Josh Harris and his experiment: placed more than 100 artists in a human terrarium under New York City, with myriad webcams following and capturing every move the artists made.
The Woman in the Window	2021	An agoraphobic woman begins to spy on her new neighbors and is witness to a crime in their apartment.
The World Without a Mask	1934	An engineer invents technology that can see through walls. The technology is pursued by criminals from the underworld.
You Were Never Really Here	2017	A hired gun rescues a trafficked girl from a brothel which is surrounded by security cameras.
La Zona	2007	A group of disadvantaged teenagers break into a gated community that is heavily under surveillance.

== Bibliography ==
- Ball, Kirstie; Haggerty, Kevin; Lyon, David (2012). Routledge Handbook of Surveillance Studies. Routledge. ISBN 978-0-415-58883-6.
- Kammerer, Dietmar (July 2010). "Surveillance Feature Films" (PDF). The Surveillance Studies Network. pp. 1–21.
- Kammerer, Dietmar (2003). "Video Surveillance in Hollywood Movies" (PDF). Surveillance & Society. 2 (2/3). ISSN 1477-7487. Archived from the original (PDF) on 2012-04-17.
- Lefait, Sébastian (2013). Surveillance on screen: Monitoring contemporary films and television programs. Scarecrow Press. ISBN 978-0-810-88590-5.
- Stewart, Garrett (2015). Closed circuits: Screening narrative surveillance. University of Chicago Press. ISBN 978-0-226-20149-8.
- Turner, John S. (October 1998). "Collapsing the Interior/Exterior Distinction: Surveillance, Spectacle, and Suspense in Popular Cinema". Wide Angle. 20 (4): 93–123. doi:10.1353/wan.1998.0042. S2CID 167968298.
- Zimmer, Catherine (2015). Surveillance cinema. New York University Press. ISBN 978-1-479-83667-3.
