= Dolz =

Dolž is a settlement in the hills southeast of Novo Mesto in southeastern Slovenia,

Dolz is also a surname and can refer to:

- Dora Dolz
- María Luisa Dolz
- Oruro Ernesto Dolz
- Paco Pérez-Dolz
- Sonia Herman Dolz
