= Barbara Broccoli =

American film producer (born 1960)

Barbara Broccoli CBE
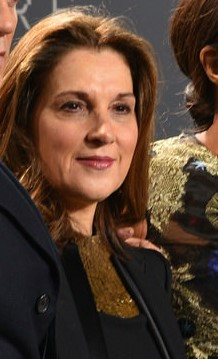
- Broccoli in 2015
- Born: Barbara Dana Broccoli; June 18, 1960 (age 66); Los Angeles, California, U.S.
- Education: Loyola Marymount University (BA)
- Occupations: Film producer; stage producer
- Years active: 1977–present
- Spouse: Frederick Zollo (m. 1991, divorced)
- Children: 1
- Parents: Albert R. Broccoli (father); Dana Natol (mother)
- Relatives: Michael G. Wilson (half-brother); David G. Wilson (half-nephew)

Barbara Dana Broccoli (Note: pronounced Brock-o-Lee not broccoli, as in the vegetable) CBE (/ˈbrɒkəli/ BROK-əl-ee; born June 18, 1960) is an American-British film and stage producer, best known internationally for her work on the James Bond film series. With her half-brother Michael G. Wilson, Broccoli held overall creative control of the Bond film franchise until 2025, when it was ceded to Amazon MGM Studios.

== Early life and education ==
Broccoli was born in Los Angeles, the daughter of the James Bond producer Albert R. "Cubby" Broccoli and actress Dana Wilson Broccoli (born Dana Natol). She was raised in London and attended Lady Eden's school in Kensington.

Broccoli graduated from Loyola Marymount University in Los Angeles, where she studied motion picture and television communications.

== Career ==
In 1995, her father Cubby Broccoli handed over control of Eon Productions, the production company responsible for the James Bond series of films, to Barbara and her half-brother Michael G. Wilson; they retained creative control of the series until 2025.

Broccoli was appointed Officer of the Order of the British Empire (OBE) in the 2008 New Year Honours and Commander of the Order of the British Empire (CBE) in the 2022 New Year Honours for services to film, drama, philanthropy and skills.

Broccoli and Wilson received the David O. Selznick Achievement Award in Theatrical Motion Pictures in 2013. In 2014, she was selected as a member of the jury for the 64th Berlin International Film Festival.

Broccoli became President of the National Youth Theatre after the success of their 60th Anniversary Diamond Gala at Shaftesbury Theatre in 2016.

=== James Bond series ===
Broccoli started working in the Bond series at the age of 17, working in the publicity department of The Spy Who Loved Me (1977). Several years later, she served as Executive Assistant on Octopussy (1983). She eventually progressed to the role of associate producer for the film The Living Daylights (1987).

Broccoli's most significant role has been as a producer of the Bond films starring Pierce Brosnan and later Daniel Craig, with Broccoli taking over from her father to join Wilson as a producer for 1995's GoldenEye (starring Brosnan) and retaining creative control of the franchise throughout the entire Craig era.

In February 2025, Broccoli and Wilson announced that they would be ceding creative control of the Bond franchise to Amazon MGM Studios, forming "a new joint venture to house the James Bond intellectual property rights". They reportedly sold the creative rights to Amazon for an estimated $1 billion, with the exact structure of the deal not publicly known. Despite ceding creative control, Broccoli and Wilson chose to remain onboard as co-owners of the franchise.

=== Stage productions ===
==== Chitty Chitty Bang Bang ====
Following her father's death in 1996, Broccoli worked with London theatre producer Michael Rose to create a stage musical, Chitty Chitty Bang Bang, based on the 1968 musical film starring Dick Van Dyke and Sally Ann Howes. Broccoli rehired the original songwriters from the film to write the new material for the stage version. The Sherman Brothers wrote five new songs for the show which debuted on April 16, 2002. The show ran at the London Palladium, and it was the longest-running and most financially successful show to have ever played there.

Chitty Chitty Bang Bang later transferred to Broadway, but it received poor reviews and closed with the loss of a large proportion of the initial $15 million investment. The musical toured extensively in the United Kingdom and in Asia, with a revised version of the show touring the United States in 2008.

==== Chariots of Fire ====
In 2012, during the festivities surrounding the 2012 Summer Olympics in London, Broccoli co-produced Chariots of Fire, the London stage adaptation of the 1981 film of the same title. Broccoli's involvement with Chariots of Fire extended back to 1980, when she introduced her friend Dodi Fayed to the screenplay; he later co-financed the film and became its executive producer. She co-produced the play along with Hugh Hudson, who directed the 1981 Oscar-winning film.

==== Other stage play productions ====
- La Cava (2000) based upon her mother's 1977 novel Florinda
- A Steady Rain (2007)
- Catwalk Confidential (2009)
- Once (2011)
- Strangers on a Train (2013)
- Love Letters (2014)
- Othello (2016)
- The Kid Stays in the Picture (2017)
- The Band’s Visit (2017)
- The Country Girls (2017)
- Cyprus Avenue (2018)
- ear for eye (2018)
- Sing Street (2019)
- Fleabag (2019)
- Macbeth (2022)
- Buena Vista Social Club (2025)

== Personal life ==
Broccoli married director and film producer Frederick M. Zollo in 1991, and they had one child. They later divorced.

== Filmography ==
Assistant director

- Octopussy (1983)
- A View to a Kill (1985)

Associate producer

- The Living Daylights (1987)
- Licence to Kill (1989)

Producer

- GoldenEye (1995)
- Tomorrow Never Dies (1997)
- The World Is Not Enough (1999)
- Die Another Day (2002)
- Casino Royale (2006)
- Quantum of Solace (2008)
- Skyfall (2012)
- Radiator (2014)
- The Silent Storm (2014)
- Spectre (2015)
- Film Stars Don't Die in Liverpool (2017)
- Nancy (2018)
- The Rhythm Section (2020)
- No Time to Die (2021)
- Till (2022)

== Awards and nominations ==
Association	Year	Category	Work	Result	Ref.
Academy Awards	2025	Irving G. Thalberg Memorial Award		Honored	
British Academy Film Awards	2007	Outstanding British Film	Casino Royale	Nominated	
British Academy Film Awards	2013	Outstanding British Film	Skyfall	Won	
British Academy Film Awards	2022	Outstanding British Film	No Time to Die	Nominated	
Producers Guild of America Awards	2013	Outstanding Producer of Theatrical Motion Pictures	Skyfall	Nominated	
Producers Guild of America Awards	2014	David O. Selznick Achievement Award in Theatrical Motion Pictures	—N/a	Won	
Producers Guild of America Awards	2023	Stanley Kramer Award	Till	Won	
Sports Emmy Awards	2021	Outstanding Long Sports Documentary	Rising Phoenix	Won	
Tony Awards	2012	Best Musical	Once	Won	
Tony Awards	2018	Best Musical	The Band's Visit	Won	
Tony Awards	2025	Best Musical	Buena Vista Social Club	Nominated	
