= Bully (2011 film) =

American documentary film by Lee Hirsch

- Theatrical release poster
- Directed by: Lee Hirsch
- Written by: Cynthia Lowen; Lee Hirsch
- Produced by: Lee Hirsch; Cynthia Lowen
- Cinematography: Lee Hirsch
- Edited by: Lindsay Utz; Jenny Golden
- Music by: Ion Furjanic; Bishop Allen
- Production companies: Cinereach; Where We Live Films
- Distributed by: The Weinstein Company
- Release dates: April 23, 2011 (Tribeca Film Festival); March 30, 2012 (United States)
- Running time: 99 minutes
- Country: United States
- Language: English
- Budget: $1.1 million
- Box office: $3.6 million

Bully (originally titled The Bully Project) is a 2011 American documentary film directed by Lee Hirsch and produced by Hirsch and Cynthia Lowen. It documents the lives of five students who face bullying on a daily basis in U.S. schools. The film premiered at the Tribeca Film Festival on April 23, 2011.

On the film's official website, the filmmakers promoted Bully as a tool to help combat bullying and facilitate an anti-bullying movement, but these goals were jeopardized by its initial R rating from the Motion Picture Association of America. Following a failed appeal of the rating, the Weinstein Company released the film unrated in theaters in the United States on March 30, 2012. After some profanity was removed, the film was re-rated PG-13, and this version of the film was released in theaters on April 13. The PG-13 version of the film was released on Blu-ray and DVD nearly a year later, on February 12, 2013.

== Content ==
The film documents the lives of several public-school students and their families in Georgia, Iowa, Texas, Mississippi, and Oklahoma during the 2009-10 school year. There is a particular focus on two students who are regularly bullied, one student who has been incarcerated after brandishing a gun on a school bus in response to being bullied, and the families of two boys who were victims of bullying and died by suicide. It describes in great detail how the average American student cannot defend themselves against ridicule.

== Synopsis ==
David Long, the father of Tyler, speaks about his son's social issues (Tyler was diagnosed with autism) and how he suspected early on that the boy might become a victim of bullying. He mentions that Tyler's peers would demoralize him verbally and do things like taking his clothes when he showered, forcing him to leave naked, and shoving him into lockers. David says these actions contributed to Tyler's decision to commit suicide in 2009, at the age of 17.

Alex Libby, who was born after 26-weeks' gestation and diagnosed with autism, is 12 years old. He is interviewed about his family and how nervous he is to begin a new school year, as he has issues with making friends. His attempts to interact with his peers at the bus stop and on the bus are met with violent threats on both occasions. At school, other students are also bullied, and one of the school's vice principals attempts to resolve one incident by simply saying the children should get along.

Kelby Johnson is a 16-year-old who has come out as a lesbian to his hometown of Tuttle, Oklahoma. He later transitioned to male prior to his death in 2025. He states that, due to the town's religious and societal beliefs, he no longer feels welcome, and was once even hit by a group of boys in a minivan, who accelerated into him as he was walking down the road. Kelby admits that he used to self-harm and has tried to commit suicide three times. His family mentions that when Kelby's sexual orientation became known, even close friends stopped talking to him. During the school year, Kelby's peers bully and ignore him, and he quit playing basketball due to the verbal abuse of his teammates. He mentions that even the teachers harass him, such as by calling him as part of a separate roll call list. Although his parents have offered to move several times, Kelby refuses, stating that, "If I leave, they win."

Ja'Meya Jackson is a 14-year-old who lives with her mother in Yazoo County, Mississippi. An honor student and talented basketball player with plans to join the Navy in order to help her mother, she was repeatedly harassed by her peers. One day, she finally had enough, and brought her mother's gun to school and brandished it on the school bus to intimidate her bullies into leaving her alone. After a brief standoff, she was tackled to the ground by another student and arrested by the police, and she is now incarcerated in a juvenile detention facility and facing felony charges for kidnapping and assaulting everyone on the bus.

Tyler's parents work to bring attention to the issue of bullying at the schools in their town and alter the "kids will be kids" attitude they feel is widespread among the staff. They organize a community meeting, and it is well-attended, but no representatives of the school district show up. One of Tyler's friends describes an atmosphere in which teachers do not intervene and blame the victim, and another child speaks about his experiences being bullied to the point that he would stay home from school to avoid seeing his bullies.

All charges against Ja'Meya are dropped, and she is put in the custody of the state until her doctors release her from a psychiatric ward, perhaps in a few months.

Ty Smalley committed suicide at age 11 after being bullied relentlessly because of his short stature. School officials claim that bullying wasn't a factor, though Trey Wallace, Ty's best friend, says otherwise. At Ty's funeral, his father has to physically support his mother as they "tuck the baby in one more time." Trey later explains that he used to be a bully, but as he got older he realized the harm and hurt he did to people, and mentions that when he would try to stand up for Ty, the latter would always tell him that, "it's not worth it", or, "be better than them."

Kelby finds a girlfriend and small group of friends, and claims he would not be here, or be able to go to school, without them. He again refuses to let his bullies "win".

Concerned for Alex's well-being, the filmmakers show his parents and school officials footage of him on the school bus being threatened, punched, and stabbed with a pencil. When his mother talks to him, Alex says he is not sure if he even feels the abuse anymore and asks who his friends are, if not the bullies. After his parents confront the administrators, there is an investigation, and a handful of students are suspended from riding the bus. Alex is told to tell someone if he is bullied again, but he says that has not helped in the past.

Ja'Meya is released into her mother's custody, and is excited to be home again. On Alex's last day of school, he signs T-shirts and laughs with some other students. Kelby agrees to attend a different school after all of the other students move to different desks to get away from him on the first day of the following school year, showing that nothing has changed. Ty's father creates an online anti-bullying group called Stand for the Silent and helps to arrange rallies all over the country, and some internationally. Tyler's father is shown leading one rally, and Kelby attends another.

== Cast ==
- Ja'Meya Jackson
- Kelby Johnson
- Lona Johnson
- Bob Johnson
- Alex Libby
- Jackie Libby
- Philip Libby
- Maya Libby
- Jada Libby
- Ethan Libby
- Logan Libby
- Kim Lockwood
- David Long
- Tina Long
- Teryn Long
- Troy Long
- Devon Matthews
- Barbara Primer
- Kirk Smalley
- Laura Smalley
- Trey Wallace
- Tyler Lee Long (archive footage)
- Mercedes Banks
- Dean Donehoo
- Vickie Reed
- Jeff Johnson
- Howard Ensley
- Derek Parker
- Chloe Albright
- James Ramsey
- Paula Crandall
- Nicholas King
- Nolan Watchorn
- Thomas Mapes

== Soundtrack ==
Title	Performer
"Teenage Dirtbag"	Scala & Kolacny Brothers
"Tasha And Rashid And Love Theme Mashup"	Force Theory
"Short Tux"	Robert Burger
"This Body"	The Lightning Bug Situation
"To The Stars! To The Night!"	Le Coup
"Foreground"	Grizzly Bear
"Torn by Wolves"	Six Organs of Admittance
"Kapsburger"	Clogs
"From a Sinking Boat"	The Magnetic Fields
"Busted Heart"	Bishop Allen

== Production ==
Lee Hirsch was a victim of bullying as a child and decided to make a documentary so the hidden lives of bullied children would be brought into the open. He approached the nonprofit organization Fractured Atlas, which gave him partial funding for the film. Significant additional funding was provided by the Sundance Institute Documentary Fund, The Fledgling Fund, BeCause Foundation, and Gravity Films. The film's music was composed by Ion Michael Furjanic (former member of the band Force Theory) and indie band Bishop Allen.

At a screening of the film in Minneapolis in September 2011, Hirsch told the audience that his having been bullied as a child was part of the inspiration for the film. He continued his discussion of the subject in an interview with a Twin Cities news website after the screening, saying: "I felt that the hardest part of being bullied was communicating, and getting help. I couldn't enroll people's support. People would say things like 'get over it,' even my own father and mother. They weren't with me. That was a big part of my wanting to make the film. It's cathartic on a daily basis." Hirsch said he hoped the film would inspire advocacy, engagement, and empowerment, not just in people who are being bullied and in their families, but also in those who, all too often, stand by and do nothing. He stated: "I hope we build something that's really sustainable. I hope this takes on a life of its own."

== Release ==
The film premiered at the Tribeca Film Festival on April 23, 2011, and was acquired by the Weinstein Company immediately afterward. It was subsequently screened at numerous other film festivals, including the Hot Docs Canadian International Documentary Festival and the LA Film Festival, and had its global premiere at the Ischia Global Film & Music Festival in Italy on July 17, 2011.

== MPAA rating ==
The filmmakers lost, by one vote, an appeal to get the Motion Picture Association of America (MPAA) to lower the film's rating from R (due to some language) to PG-13. On February 27, 2012, an online petition was created on Change.org to encourage the CEO of the MPAA to change the rating, because the R rating would prevent the intended audience from seeing the film. As of March 15, 2012, the petition had collected more than 300,000 signatures, but the MPAA hesitated to make the change. At the time, Joan Graves of the MPAA said that, although Bully was a "wonderful film", the organization's primary responsibility in the matter was to provide information to parents about the film's content.

On March 26, 2012, The Weinstein Company announced that, to protest the MPAA's rating of the film, it would release Bully unrated, even though this would likely restrict the film to art-house and independently owned theaters, as AMC, Cinemark, and many other American cinema chains have policies against screening unrated films. However, AMC announced it would allow the film in its theaters and even let minors watch it upon receipt of a signed permission slip from a parent or guardian. Regal Cinemas indicated it would carry the film, but treat it as an R-rated feature. At the time of the film's initial theatrical release on March 30, 2012, it had been rated PG in six of Canada's ten provinces (Alberta, British Columbia, Manitoba, Ontario, Québec, and Saskatchewan), and so had warnings about the coarse language, but no age restrictions.

In April 2012, The Weinstein Company came to an agreement with the MPAA. After removing some of the profanity, the film received a new rating of PG-13 (for intense thematic material, disturbing content and some strong language—all involving kids), which meant that children of all ages could watch it without an adult. The Weinstein Company subsequently announced that the PG-13 version of the film would be released nationwide on April 13. At the widest point of its release, the film was being screened in 265 theaters.

== Reception ==
Bully was positively received by critics. On review aggregator website Rotten Tomatoes, it has an approval rating of 85% based on 142 reviews, with an average score of 7.20/10; the site's "critics consensus" reads: "Hard-hitting and gracefully filmed, Bully powerfully delivers an essential message to an audience that may not be able to see it." On Metacritic, the film has a weighted average score of 74/100 based on 33 reviews.

Roger Ebert gave the film three out of four, and wrote: "Bully is a sincere documentary but not a great one. We feel sympathy for the victims, and their parents or friends, but the film helplessly seems to treat bullying as a problem without a solution."

The film is referenced in the South Park episode "Butterballs", particularly a scene in which Kyle asks Stan, who created an anti-bullying documentary: "If this video needs to be seen by everyone, why don't you put it on the Internet for free?" (to which Stan has no answer).

== Awards and accolades ==
Award/Organization	Year	Category	Nominee(s)	Result
Awards Circuit Community Awards	2012	Best Documentary Feature Film	Lee Hirsch	Nominated
Bergen International Film Festival	2011	Audience Award	Lee Hirsch	Won
Broadcast Film Critics Association Awards	2013	Best Documentary Feature	Bully	Nominated
Cinema Eye Honors	2013	Audience Choice Prize	Lee Hirsch	Won
Dallas-Fort Worth Film Critics Association	2012	Best Documentary	Bully	2nd place
Denver Film Critics Society	2012	Best Documentary Film	Bully	Nominated
Dorian Awards	2013	Documentary of the Year	Bully	Nominated
Gold Derby Awards	2013	Documentary Feature	Lee Hirsch and Cynthia Lowen	Nominated
Golden Reel Awards (Motion Picture Sound Editors)	2013	Best Sound Editing – Sound Effects, Foley, Dialogue, ADR and Music in a Feature Documentary	Christopher Barnett, Al Nelson, Gary Rydstrom, Ion Michael Furjanic, Pete Horner, Bob Edwards, and Pascal Garneau	Nominated
Golden Trailer Awards	2012	Best Documentary	The Weinstein Company and The AV Squad	Nominated
Golden Trailer Awards	2012	Best Documentary Poster	The Weinstein Company	Nominated
Hamptons International Film Festival	2011	Film of Conflict and Resolution	Lee Hirsch	Won
Houston Film Critics Society	2012	Best Documentary Feature	Bully	Nominated
Las Vegas Film Critics Society	2012	Best Documentary	Bully	Won
New Media Film Festival	2015	Best LGBT	Bully	Won
News and Documentary Emmy Awards	2015	Best Documentary	Lee Hirsch and Cynthia Lowen	Nominated
News and Documentary Emmy Awards	2015	Outstanding Informational Programming – Long Form	Lee Hirsch, Sally Jo Fifer, Cindy Waitt, Lois Vossen, and Cynthia Lowen	Nominated
North Texas Film Critics Association	2012	Best Documentary	Bully	Won
Online Film & Television Association	2013	Best Documentary Picture	Cynthia Lowen, Lee Hirsch, and Cindy Waitt	Nominated
Producers Guild of America Awards	2013	Stanley Kramer Award	Lee Hirsch and Cynthia Lowen	Won
Phoenix Film Critics Society	2012	Best Documentary	Bully	Nominated
San Diego Film Critics Society	2012	Best Documentary	Bully	Nominated
Silverdocs Documentary Festival	2011	Documentary	Lee Hirsch	Nominated
Southeastern Film Critics Association	2012	Best Documentary	Bully	2nd place
St. Louis Film Critics Association	2012	Best Documentary Film	Bully	2nd place
São Paulo International Film Festival	2012	Best Foreign Film	Lee Hirsch	Nominated
Tribeca Film Festival	2011	Best Documentary Feature	Lee Hirsch	Nominated
Washington D.C. Area Film Critics Association	2012	Best Documentary	Bully	Won
Zurich Film Festival	2011	Best International Documentary Film	Lee Hirsch	Nominated
