= 2011 Bergen International Film Festival =

Film festival in Bergen, Norway

The 2011 Bergen International Film Festival is arranged in Bergen, Norway 19–26 October 2011, and was the 12th edition of the festival. It features over 175 feature films and documentaries, a new record for the festival. For the first time the festival arranged a competition program for Norwegian documentaries.

== Films in competition ==
=== Cinema Extraordinare – In competition ===
- Above Us Only Sky, directed by Jan Schomburg Germany
- Arriya – The Stone, directed by Alberto Gorritiberea Spain
- Beduin, directed by Igor Voloshin Russia
- Confessions, directed by Tetsuya Nakashima Japan
- Declaration of War, directed by Valérie Donzelli France
- Even the Rain, directed by Icíar Bollaín Spain
- Las Acacias, directed by Pablo Giorgelli Argentina
- Meek's Cutoff, directed by Kelly Reichardt USA
- Natural Selection, directed by Robbie Pickering USA
- Sleeping Beauty, directed by Julia Leigh Australia
- The Prize, directed by Paula Markovitch Argentina
- Twilight Portrait, directed by Angelina Nikonova Russia
- Womb, directed by Benedek Fliegauf Hungary

=== International Documentaries – In competition ===
- The Black Power Mixtape 1967–1975, directed by Göran Hugo Olsson Sweden
- Bombay Beach, directed by Alma Har'el USA
- Buck, directed by Cindy Meehl USA
- Chasing Madoff, directed by Jeff Prosserman USA
- Cinema Komunisto, directed by Mila Turajlic Serbia
- A Man's Story, directed by Varon Bonicos United Kingdom
- Koran by Heart, directed by Greg Barker USA
- Hot Coffee, directed by Susan Saladoff USA
- Something Ventured, directed by Dayna Goldfine and Dan Geller USA
- The Two Escobars, directed by Michael and Jeff Zimbalist USA
- Vodka Factory, directed by Jerzy Sladkowski Sweden
- We Were Here, directed by David Weissman USA

=== Checkpoints – In competition ===
- Family Portrait in Black and White, directed by Julia Ivanova Canada
- If a Tree Falls: A Story of the Earth Liberation Front, directed by Marshall Curry USA
- The Last Mountain, directed by Bill Haney USA
- The Interrupters, directed by Steve James USA
- The Oath, directed by Laura Poitras USA
- In God We Trust, directed by Astrid Schau-Larsen

=== Norwegian Documentaries – In competition ===
- The Afghan Nightmare, directed by Klaus Erik Okstad
- Death in Camp Delta, directed by Erling Borgen
- Folk ved Fjorden, directed by Øyvind Sandberg
- Ragnhild's Story, directed by Siren Henschien
- Imagining Emmanuel, directed by Thomas Østbye
- Urban Hunters, directed by Sturla Pilskog & Sidse Larsen
- The Doctors' War, directed by Elsa Kvamme
- My Beloved, directed by Hilde Korsæth
- Personal Velocity, directed by Jon Vatne
- Salesman 329, directed by Kari Anne Moe
- Snapshots, directed by Anniken Hoel

=== Norwegian Short Film Competition ===
- Alt faller sammen, directed by Andrew Amorim
- Asyl, directed by Jørn Utkilen
- Erkjenning, directed by Jøran Wærdahl
- Everything Will Be OK, directed by Jonas Matzow Guldbrandsen
- Farukhs mynt, directed by Susanne Falkum Løvik
- From This Day to Where, directed by Matias Rygh & Mathias Eriksen
- No Sex Just Understand, directed by Mariken Halle

=== Scandinavias Best Music Video ===
This year the five videos from the respective three countries was nominated by NRK P3 in Norway, SVT in Sweden and the magazine Soundvenue in Denmark.

- Young Dreams – "Young Dreams", directed by Kristoffer Borgli Norway
- Torgny – "I Came Here", directed by Emil Trier Norway
- Karl X Johan – "Flames", directed by Gustav Johansson Sweden
