= Magnus Barefoot Cinema Centre =

Cinema in Bergen, Norway

Coordinates: 60°23′27.848″N 5°19′10.55″E

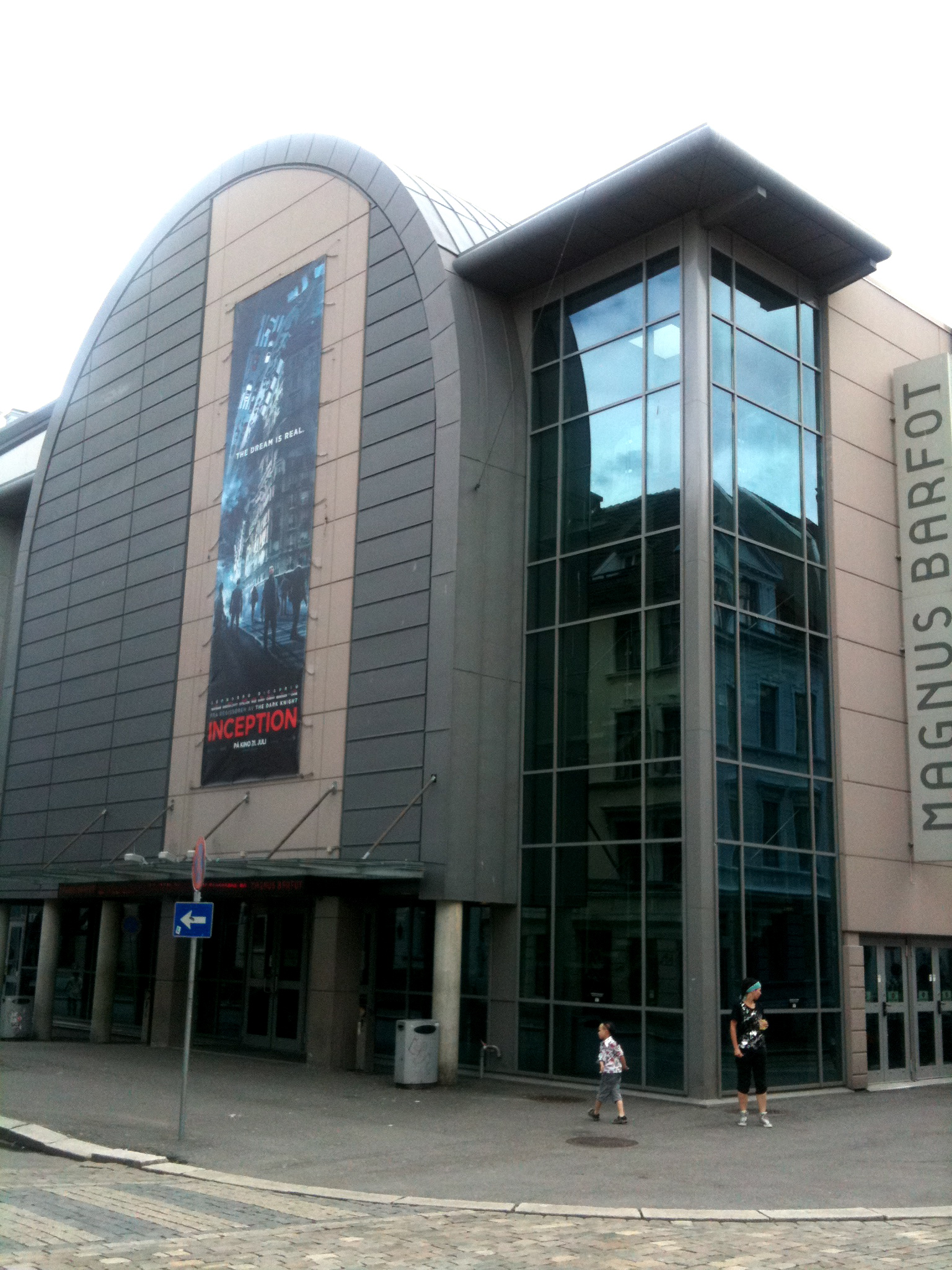
Magnus Barfot Kino

Magnus Barefoot Cinema Centre (Norwegian: Magnus Barfot Kino) is a cinema multiplex in Bergen, Norway. It is the main venue of Bergen International Film Festival.

The cinema is owned by Bergen Kino AS. It was named after the street that runs along the building (however, it is not the address of the complex), which in turned was named after 11th-century Norwegian monarch Magnus Barefoot (1073–1103). The cinema complex, which opened to the public on October 1, 2004, has five cinemas over five floors with a total of 1,060 seats. The building was designed by the architectural firm Grieg Arkitekter.
