= 2009 Bergen International Film Festival =

Film festival in Bergen, Norway

The 2009 Bergen International Film Festival was arranged in Bergen, Norway 21st-28 October 2009, and was the 10th edition of the festival.

== Important screenings ==
Opening film:

- In the Loop, directed by Armando Iannucci United Kingdom

Closing film:

- A Serious Man, directed by Joel and Ethan Coen United States

== Films in competition ==
=== Cinema Extraordinare - In competition ===
- About Elly, directed by Asghar Farhadi Iran
- Angel at Sea, directed by Frédéroc Dumon Belgium
- Buick Riviera, directed by Goran Rušinović Croatia
- Choi voi, directed by Bui Thac Chuyen Vietnam
- Cosmonauta, directed by Susanna Nicchiarelli Italy
- Devil's Town, directed by Vladimir Paskaljevic Serbia
- Fransesca, directed by Bobby Paunescu Romania
- Humpday, directed by Lynn Shelton United States
- Men on the Bridge, directed by Aslı Özge Turkey
- No One's Son, directed by Arsen Anton Ostojić Croatia
- The Time That Remains, directed by Elia Suleiman Israel
- Wolfy, directed by Vasili Sigarev Russia
- Whisky with Vodka, directed by Andreas Dresen Germany

=== Documentaries - In competition ===
- Afghan Star, directed by Havana Marking United Kingdom
- Art & Copy, directed by Doug Pray United States
- Objectified, directed by Gary Hustwit United States
- End of the Line, directed by Rupert Murray United Kingdom
- The Yes Men Fix the World, directed by Andy Bichlbaum, Mike Bonanno and Kurt Engfehr United States
- Unmistaken Child, directed by Nati Baratz Israel

=== Norwegian Short Film Competition ===
- Ella, regi Hanne Larsen
- Den tredje dagen, regi Beate Pedersen
- Gjemsel, Alexandra Niemczyk
- Motholic Mobble 3 & 4, regi Kaia Hugin
- Saíva, regi Tuva Synnevåg
- Skylappjenta, regi Iram Haq

=== Jubilee program ===
On the occasion of the 10th version of the Bergen International Film Festival, festival leader Tor Fosse arranged a special jubilee program consisting of special films that where important in the creation of independent Norwegian film festivals in 80s and 90s.

- Yeelen (1987), directed by Souleymane Cissé Mali
- The Oak (1992), directed by Lucian Pintilie Romania
- My Friend Ivan Lapshin (1984), directed by Aleksei German, Soviet Union
- Crazy Love (1987), directed by Dominique Deruddere, Belgium

== Awards ==
=== Cinema Extraordinare ===
- 2009: No One's Son, directed by Arsen Anton Ostojić Croatia

=== The Audience Award ===
- 2009: Bring Children from Streets, directed by Espen Faugstad and Eivind Nilsen Norway

=== Best Documentary ===
- 2009: Afghan Star, directed by Havana Marking United Kingdom

=== Youth Jury's Documentary Award ===
- 2009: The Cove, directed by Louie Psihoyos United States

=== Best Norwegian Short Film ===
- 2009: Skylappjenta, directed by Iram Haq

=== Young Talent Award ===
- 2009: Espen Faugstad and Eivind Nilsen
