= Praying for Armageddon =

2023 Norwegian documentary film

- Directed by: Michael Rowley and Tonje Hessen Schei
- Produced by: Christian Aune Falch, Torstein Parelius, Ingrid Aune Falch
- Starring: Lee Fang
- Edited by: Torkel Gjørv and Matti Näränen
- Music by: Lukas Berkemar
- Production company: UpNorth Film
- Distributed by: DR Sales
- Release date: March 20, 2023 (Denmark)
- Running time: 1h 37m
- Country: Norway
- Language: English
- Budget: $1,186,000

Praying for Armageddon is a 2023 Norwegian documentary film exploring the influence of American Evangelicals on American foreign policy in the Middle East. It is directed by Tonje Hessen Schei and co-directed by Michael Rowley. The film premiered in Copenhagen at the CPH:DOX festival on 20 March 2023, after eight years in production.

== Content ==
The film follows investigative journalist Lee Fang of The Intercept as he examines the power and influence of fundamentalist evangelical Christians in American politics. The evangelicals portrayed in the film, are part of a group that represents approximately 30 percent of American voters. They interpret biblical scripture literally and believe it is their responsibility to fulfill God's plan for Armageddon in order to hasten the Second Coming of Christ.

The documentary explores how evangelical leaders have systematically infiltrated American political institutions. Organizations like Christians United for Israel (CUFI), founded by Pastor John Hagee and boasting ten million members, have lobbied for billions of dollars in military aid to Israel. The film also examines the role of Capitol Ministries, founded by Ralph Drollinger, which conducts Bible study sessions with members of Congress and formerly with Trump's cabinet. The documentary details how these evangelical groups view a strong Israel under Jewish control as essential to biblical prophecy. For evangelicals, this means supporting Israeli territorial expansion and opposing Palestinian claims, as they believe this will trigger the apocalyptic events described in the Book of Revelation. The film shows how evangelical groups provide funding and moral support for Israeli settlement projects in the West Bank.

The film includes interviews with various evangelical figures, including Pastor Gary Burd, who runs a motorcycle ministry in Texas and believes Christians must be prepared to defend their faith with force. It also features former evangelical preacher Frank Schaeffer, who warns about the dangers of heavily armed religious groups.

== Production ==
The film was produced by UpNorth Film and is a co-production between Norway, Sweden, and Finland. It was supported by Arte and Creative Europe, among others. Over half of the film's funding came from Norwegian public sources, including Nordic Film Institute (NFI) and Art Council Norway. The project also received support through Tonje Hessen Schei's 2020 Chicken & Egg Award.

The film took eight years to produce, with production beginning before Donald Trump's presidency. Schei noted that the pro-Israel, evangelical movement gained significant acceleration during the Trump administration, making the film more urgent and relevant than when production first started.

Co-director Michael Rowley, who grew up in an evangelical background in Texas, helped the production team gain trust and access to evangelical communities. The directors spent considerable time building relationships with subjects like Pastor Gary Burd, whom they began filming in 2016.

== Release ==
The film had its World premiere at the CPH:DOX festival in Copenhagen on 20 March 2023, competing for the festival's F:act Award. It subsequently screened at Hot Docs 2023 in Toronto, and played at the Bertha DocHouse in London on 28 July 2023. The film premiered in the United States on 8 October 2023 at the Hamptons International Film Festival. The film's international distribution was handled by DR Sales.

The film secured television distribution deals with several European outlets, including the BBC. Director Schei expressed hope for wide distribution in the United States, stating that "the American audience is the most important audience group" for her.

== Reception ==
Jessica Kiang, writing for Variety, described the film as "a glossy, persuasive and increasingly alarming documentary", calling it "a compelling, sobering Revelation all its own" that revealed the scale of "a type of political insanity that would entrust the future to people who don’t want there to be a future at all."

In a review for POV Magazine, critic Courtney Small described the film as "playing like a political thriller" that "sounds the alarm for all the political fires that are being started by this dangerous influence."

The Danish film magazine Ekko gave the film a mixed review, awarding it three out of six stars. Reviewer Kristian Ditlev Jensen praised the film's interesting subject matter but criticized it for being overly activist in its approach, stating that the documentary's strong partisan stance made it feel like propaganda rather than maintaining objectivity.

Carmen Gray wrote in the Modern Times Review that the documentary "does not have to search far to find the radical and unhinged" and "packages its factual overview in the foreboding tone of a thriller."

Sheldon Kirshner, writing for The Times of Israel, called the film "thoughtful and disturbing".
