= Cynthia Lowen =

American poet

- Born: Amherst, Masschuttes, U.S.
- Education: Colorado College; Sarah Lawrence College
- Occupation: Poet
- Writing career
- Genre: Poetry

Cynthia Lowen is the producer and writer of the 2011 documentary film Bully and director and producer of the 2018 documentary film Netizens.

== Biography ==
Lowen grew up in Amherst, Massachusetts and graduated from Colorado College in Colorado Springs, Colorado in 2001. In 2006, she graduated from Sarah Lawrence College in Yonkers, New York with an MFA.

Her writing has appeared in the Black Warrior Review, and in The Laurel Review.

== Awards ==
- 2008 Campbell's Corner Poetry Award
- “Discovery”/Boston Review Poetry Prize
- Inkwell Poetry Competition
- Fine Arts Work Center in Provincetown, Massachusetts, Fellowship

== Works ==
- Campbell's Corner 2008 Poetry Collection, The Language Exchange
- "Principles of Uncertainty", Boston Review, MAY/JUNE 2008
- Mapping the interior. Sarah Lawrence College. 2006.
- Conversations in poetry. Colorado College. 2000.

=== Anthologies ===
- Mark Strand; Jeb Livingood, eds. (2008). Best New Poets, 2008: 50 Poems from Emerging Writers. Samovar Press. ISBN 978-0-9766296-3-4.

=== Essays ===
- "A Frequent Winner's Advice", Poets & Writers
