= Drone (2014 film) =

- Film poster
- Directed by: Tonje Hessen Schei
- Produced by: Lars Løge
- Cinematography: Steven Moore; Anna Myking
- Edited by: Joakim Schager
- Music by: Olav Øyehaug
- Production company: Flimmer Film
- Release dates: April 15, 2014 (Arte); February 27, 2015 (Norway)
- Running time: 58 minutes (TV edit); 79 minutes (theatrical edit)
- Country: Norway
- Language: English

Drone is a 2014 English-language documentary film directed by Norwegian director Tonje Hessen Schei. The film explores the use of drones in warfare. Drone aired on the TV network Arte on April 15, 2014. The documentary screened at several film festivals throughout 2014, winning several awards. Drone was released in Norway on February 27, 2015.

== Premise ==
Variety reported, "'Drone' depicts the recruitment of young pilots at gaming conventions, explores the changing perceptions of what 'going to war' means, as well as the moral stance of engineers behind the technology. The docu also investigates the ways in which world leaders engage in wars, as well as look at the struggle of anti-war and civil rights activists."

== Production ==
Drone was produced by Lars Løge at Flimmer Film and directed by Tonje Hessen Schei. The film received financial support from backers in Norway and from around the world.

== Release ==
=== Theatrical screenings ===
The sales outfit LevelK acquired Drone at the Nordic Film Market at the Gothenburg Film Festival in January 2014. A 58-minute cut of Drone premiered on the TV network Arte on April 15, 2014. A 79-minute cut was edited for subsequent screenings. In October 2014, Drone screened at the Bergen International Film Festival and won Best Norwegian Documentary and the Checkpoint Human Rights awards. In January 2015, it screened at the Tromsø International Film Festival and won the Norwegian Peace Film Award. In the following February, LevelK sold distribution rights to Drone to several major territories.

Drone was released in Norway on February 27, 2015. It was released in the United Kingdom on April 10, 2015.

=== Critical reception ===
John DeFore, reviewing for The Hollywood Reporter, called Drone "an important contribution to debates over a means of warfare that is just in its infancy". DeFore said the documentary had an "effective and clear-headed" presentation of "multiple sides of the debate". The critic concluded, "Drone takes a quick look at realities of the warfare industry and asks the obvious question: How will Americans feel when another government (or non-governmental entity) has remote-controlled death hovering constantly over our heads?"

== See also ==
- List of films featuring drones
