= Woman (2019 film) =

2019 documentary film

- Official Poster
- Directed by: Yann Arthus-Bertrand; Anastasia Mikova
- Produced by: Hope Production
- Music by: Armand Amar
- Release date: 1 September 2019
- Running time: 108 minutes
- Country: France

Woman is a 2019 documentary by French environmentalist Yann Arthus-Bertrand and Ukrainian director Anastasia Mikova.

== Synopsis ==
The film is based on interviews with 2,000 women from 50 countries, and covers the status of women all over the world. The topics covered include forced marriages, sexual assault, female genital mutilation, acid attacks, motherhood, sexuality, menstruation, education and the professional success of women.

== Awards ==
Woman was nominated for Best International Documentary at the 2019 Bergen International Film Festival. It won the Sfera 1932 Award at the 76th Venice International Film Festival.
