= 2003 Bergen International Film Festival =

Film festival in Bergen, Norway

The 2003 Bergen International Film Festival was arranged in Bergen, Norway 16–21 October 2003, and was the fourth edition of the festival.

== Competitive programs ==
=== Cinema Extraordinare ===
- A Good Lawyer's Wife, directed by Im Sang-soo South Korea
- Any Way the Wind Blows, directed by Tom Barman Belgium
- Blind Shaft, directed by Li Yang China
- Chinese Odyssey 2002, directed by Jeffrey Lau Hong Kong
- Dark Cities, directed by Fernando Sariñana Mexico
- Facing Windows, directed by Ferzan Özpetek Italy
- Falling Angels, directed by Scott Smith Canada
- Kakuto, directed by Yūsuke Iseya Japan
- Love Me If You Dare, directed by Yann Samuell France
- Personal Velocity: Three Portraits, directed by Rebecca Miller United States
- Pornografia, directed by Jan Jakub Kolski Poland
- Song for a Raggy Boy, directed by Aisling Walsh Ireland
- The Longing, directed by Iain Dilthey Germany
- Travellers and Magicians, directed by Khyentse Norbu Bhutan
- Tycoon: A New Russian, directed by Pavel Lungin Russia

== Non-competitive programs ==
=== 3 Short Films from Stavanger ===
- Taperaksje, directed by Stian Kristiansen
- Hål i hjerta, directed by Vigdis Nielsen
- Sjokoladesaus, directed Jørgen Tjernsland

== Awards ==
=== Cinema Extraordinare ===
- Blind Shaft, directed by Li Yang China

=== The Audience Award ===
- Kill Bill Vol. 1, directed by Quentin Tarantino United States

=== Best Norwegian Short Film ===
- Fear Less, directed by Therese Jacobsen

=== The Critic's Award ===
Only time awarded.

- A Good Lawyer's Wife, directed by Im Sang-soo South Korea
