= Sonia Herman Dolz =

Dutch film director

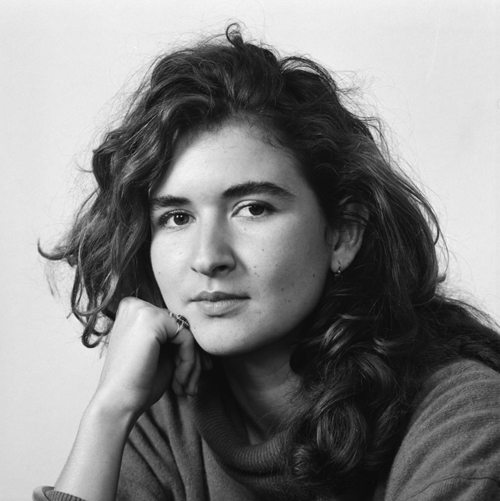
- Sonia Herman Dolz, 1986
- Born: 15 November 1962 (age 63); Madrid, Spain
- Occupation: Film Director
- Known for: "Romance de Valentía" (1993)

Sonia Herman Dolz (born 15 November 1962 in Madrid) is a Dutch film director, screenwriter and documentary filmmaker, who gained international fame in 1993 with her documentary "Romance de Valentía" about the Spanish bullfighting.

== Life and work ==
Dolz is the daughter of the Czech-Peruvian economist Herman Dolz and the visual artist Dora Dolz, who came with her parents to the Netherlands at the age of three. She grew up in Rotterdam and studied Spanish language and literature at the University of Leiden. She also studied film and directing at the Free Academy in The Hague, where she graduated in 1994.

Since 1993 she has been working as a filmmaker, screenwriter, photographer and occasionally as a producer, camera-woman and sound-woman. Between 1993 and 1996 she also worked as a documentary maker for the VPRO program Diogenes, and since then she works on her own films.

In 1993, she broke through internationally with her first feature documentary "Romance de Valentía" about the Spanish bullfighting, which was awarded at several European film festivals. Her film "Lagrimas Negras" (1997) about the Cuban old timers band Vieja Trova Santiaguera, won multiple awards, and anticipated Wim Wenders' Buena Vista Social Club, (1999). Sonia's subsequent documentaries include "The Master and His Pupil" about the Russian conductor Valery Gergiev, and filmic portraits of the Dutch folk singer Frédérique Spigt, and Sonia's mother, artist Dora Dolz.

Sonia's work is distinguished several times among others with the Golden Calf Special Jury Prize in 1998; as the best documentary at the Golden Prague Festival 2003; as best documentary at the Bergen International Film Festival in 2004; and with the Pendrecht Culture Prize in 2007 in Rotterdam.

== Honors ==
Romance de Valentía, 1993

- Golden Hugo for Best Documentary, Chicago International Film Festival, 1994
- Best Documentary, Festróia Festival Internacional de Cinema de Tróia, Portugal, 1994
- Certificate of Merit, San Francisco International Film Festival, 1994

Lágrimas Negras, 1997

- Golden Calf, Special Jury Award, Netherlands Film Festival, 1998
- Gouden Beeld 'Academy Award', Netherlands Academy Award Foundation, 1999
- Holland Film Award, 1999
- Golden Plaque, Chicago International Film Festival, 1998
- Audience Award and Silver Spire Award, San Francisco International Film Festival, 1998
- Audience Award, Chicago Latino Film Festival, 1999

Yo soy así, 2000

- Grand Prize for Best Feature Documentary, International Documentary Festival Encontros Internacionais Cinema, Lisbon, 2000
- Prize of the Association of Cinematographers, International Documentary Festival Encontros Internacionais Cinema, Lisbon, 2000
- Premio F.A.D. de Artes Parateatrales, Barcelona, 2000

Master and His Pupil, 2003

- Golden Prague Award for Best Documentary, International Television Festival, Prague, 2003
- Best Documentary, Tribeca Film Festival, New York, 2004
- Gouden Beeld 'Academy Award', Netherlands Academy Award Foundation, 2004
- Best documentary, Bergen International Festival, Norway, 2004
- Prix de l'AQCC (Association Québécoise des Critiques) / AQCC Award, Festival du Nouveau Cinéma, Montreal, 2004

== Filmography, a selection ==
- 1993: Romance de Valentía (Only The Brave)
- 1997. Lágrimas Negras (Black Tears)
- 2000. Yo Soy Así (This Is Me)
- 2003. The Master and His Pupil
- 2004. Mans genoeg
- 2004. She Came To Win
- 2006. Portrait of Dora Dolz
- 2009. Blanco - The Hidden Language of the Soul
- 2010. All My Tomorrows
- 2012. De balletmeesters
- 2015. Conducting Boijmans
