= IHuman (film) =

2019 Norwegian documentary film by Tonje Hessen Schei

iHuman
- Film poster
- Directed by: Tonje Hessen Schei
- Produced by: Sue Turley; Philippa Kowarsky; Annie Roney; Jonathan Borge Lie; Helle Faber; Christian Aune Falch; Torstein Parelius; Ingrid Galadriel; Aune Falch; Danielle Turkov
- Production companies: Up North Film AS; Made in Copenhagen
- Release date: 23 November 2019 (IDFA)
- Country: Norway
- Language: English

iHuman is a 2019 documentary about artificial intelligence, social control and power. The film shows how this technology is changing our lives, our society and our future. Such experts as Ilya Sutskever and Jürgen Schmidhuber give interviews about AI and how it is developed and implemented. It also features people working in the field like Max Tegmark, Kara Swisher, Michal Kosinski, Stuart Russell, Ben Wizner, Hao Li, Ben Goertzel and Philip Alston. The documentary features its own character representing AI that develops through the film. This character has an abstract VFX form done by Theodor Groeneboom. The constant surveillance through phones, internet, systems in society and through surveillance cameras is discussed as a topic crucial for development of AI. The question is posed, if we already are governed by algorithms that are created by big tech corporations, governments and the military industry. It mentions Palantir Technologies and Cambridge Analytica.

The film premiered at the 2019 International Documentary Film Festival Amsterdam on 23 November.

== See also ==
- Lo and Behold, Reveries of the Connected World
- Existential risk from artificial general intelligence
- Regulation of algorithms
- Social Credit System
