= Producers Guild Stanley Kramer Award =

The Stanley Kramer Award, since its inception in 2002 by the Producers Guild of America and named after film director/producer Stanley Kramer, has been given for films that "illuminate provocative social issues".

== History ==
Sean Penn, Jane Fonda and Rita Moreno (each an Academy Award winner) are the only three people to receive this award.

== Recipients ==
- 2001: I Am Sam
- 2002: Antwone Fisher
- 2003: In America
- 2004: Hotel Rwanda (TIE)

Voces inocentes (Innocent Voices) (TIE)

- 2005: Good Night, and Good Luck
- 2006: An Inconvenient Truth
- 2007: The Great Debaters
- 2008: Milk
- 2009: Precious
- 2010: Sean Penn (first person to receive a Stanley Kramer Award)
- 2011: In the Land of Blood and Honey
- 2012: Bully
- 2013: Fruitvale Station
- 2014: The Normal Heart
- 2015: The Hunting Ground
- 2016: Loving
- 2017: Get Out
- 2018: Jane Fonda
- 2019: Bombshell
- 2020: No award
- 2021: Rita Moreno
- 2022: Till
- 2023: No award

== See also ==
- NBR Freedom of Expression
- Social problem film
- Message picture
