= Catwalk Confidential =

2009 play by Robyn Peterson

- West End Poster
- Written by: Robyn Peterson
- Original language: English

Premiere

Catwalk Confidential is a play by Robyn Peterson, based on her life as a Catwalk model. It played the Edinburgh Fringe Festival before transferring to the West End for a limited four week run in September 2009. It starred Peterson as herself.
