= Sahar Fetrat =

Afghan screenwriter

- Born: Afghanistan
- Education: American University of Afghanistan (BBA, 2018); Central European University (MA in Gender Studies, 2020)
- Occupations: Activist; Screenwriter; Documentary filmmaker
- Employers: UNESCO Education Services (former); Human Rights Watch, Women's Rights Division (Assistant Researcher)
- Known for: Advocacy for Afghan women's education and rights
- Awards: BBC 100 Women (2021)

Sahar Fetrat is an Afghan activist, screenwriter and documentary filmmaker. Sahar was born in Afghanistan and lived in Iran and Pakistan as a young refugee during the first Taliban regime.

== Biography ==
Sahar's family went into exile when she was one year old, and grew up in refugee camps in Iran and Pakistan during the first Taliban regime.

She graduated in 2018 in Business Studies at the American University of Afghanistan and obtained a master's degree in Gender Studies at the Central European University in Budapest in 2020.

Sahar Fetrat worked in Afghanistan for UNESCO Education Services advocating for women's education throughout the country and an Assistant Researcher at the Women's Rights Division of the international human rights organization Human Rights Watch.

== Awards ==
- BBC 100 Women 2021
