= Dora Dolz =

Spanish-Dutch artist (1941–2008)

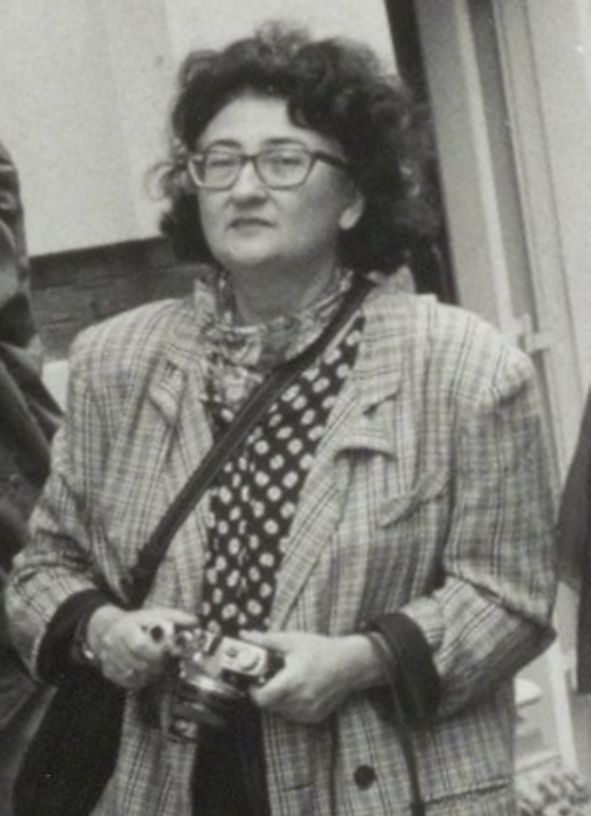
- Dora Dolz in Haarlem, 1993.
- Born: 5 November 1941; Barcelona, Spain
- Died: 1 March 2008 (aged 66); Rotterdam, The Netherlands
- Education: Rotterdam Academy of Art
- Known for: Ceramics
- Awards: Wolfert van Borselenpenning

Dora Dolz de Herman (Barcelona, 5 November 1941 - Rotterdam, 1 March 2008) was a Spanish-Dutch artist, best known for her outdoor ceramic works in the form of chairs and sofas.

== Life and work ==
Dolz grew up in Barcelona, where her father had a booth at the flea market. In 1965 she moved to the Netherlands when her husband wanted to pursue a PhD in economics at the Tinbergen Institute. Between 1967 and 1971 she studied at the Rotterdam Academy of Art, where she was a lecturer herself from the 1980s.

As an artist Dolz mainly produced paintings, ceramics, glassware, rugs, which were often pictured in flamboyant colors form. Recurring themes (leitmotifs) in these works were birth, life, suffering and death. Her work is found in the collections of the Museum Boijmans Van Beuningen in Rotterdam and the Museum de Fundatie (Heino). There are sculptures by her in the center of Rotterdam, Rotterdam West, Rotterdam North, Capelle aan den IJssel, Schiedam, Tiel and Groningen.

In 1988 Dotz received the Victorine Heftingprijs, and in January 2008 the municipality of Rotterdam awarded her the Wolfert van Borselen medal. She was awarded the Judith Leysterprize three times, the third time in 1992.

Her daughter is the filmmaker Sonia Herman Dolz, who in 2005 made a movie portrait about her called Portrait of Dora Dolz.

== Exhibitions, a selection ==
- 1973. Gallery 't Venster, Rotterdam.
- 1975. Salon der Maassteden, Stedelijk Museum Schiedam.
- 1975. Dora Dolz and Guus de Ruyter, De Doelen Rotterdam.
- 1977. Gallery da Costa, Amsterdam
- 1981. Gallery Alto, Rotterdam.
- 1986. Salon D T' EEN, Gallery De lachende Koe, Rotterdam.
- 1987. Leda en de Zwaan, Gallery De lachende Koe Rotterdam
- 1992. Keramisch werk en schilderijen van Dora Dolz, Noordbrabants Museum, 's-Hertogenbosch.
- 2005. Galerij Erasmus, Complex Hoboken, Rotterdam.
- 2007-08. Boijmans Van Beuningen, Rotterdam.

== Gallery ==
=== Sculptures ===
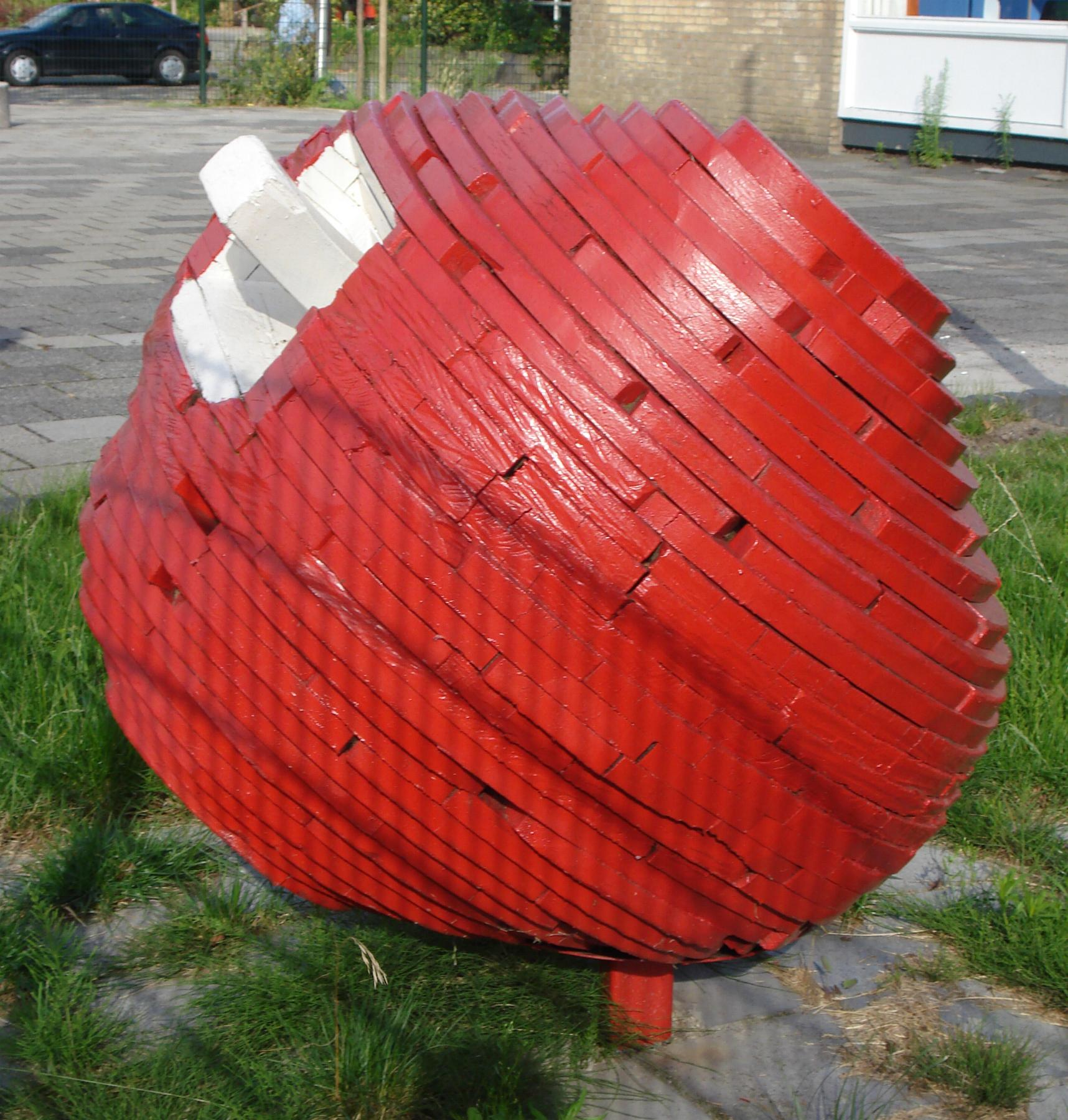
Wooden apple (1978), Reigerlaan, Capelle aan den IJssel (along with Kees Franse)

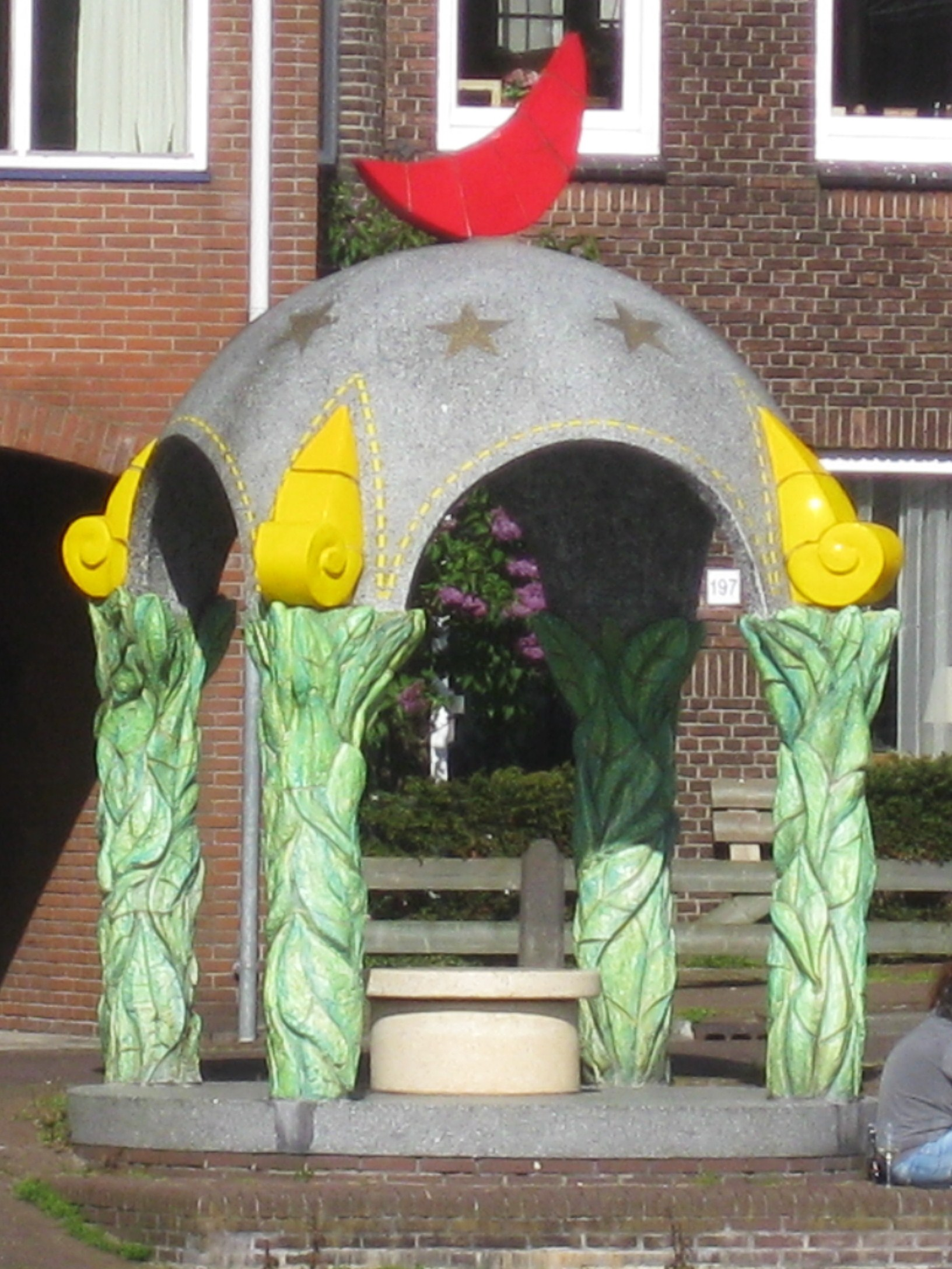
Pagode Catalana (1978), Haarlem.

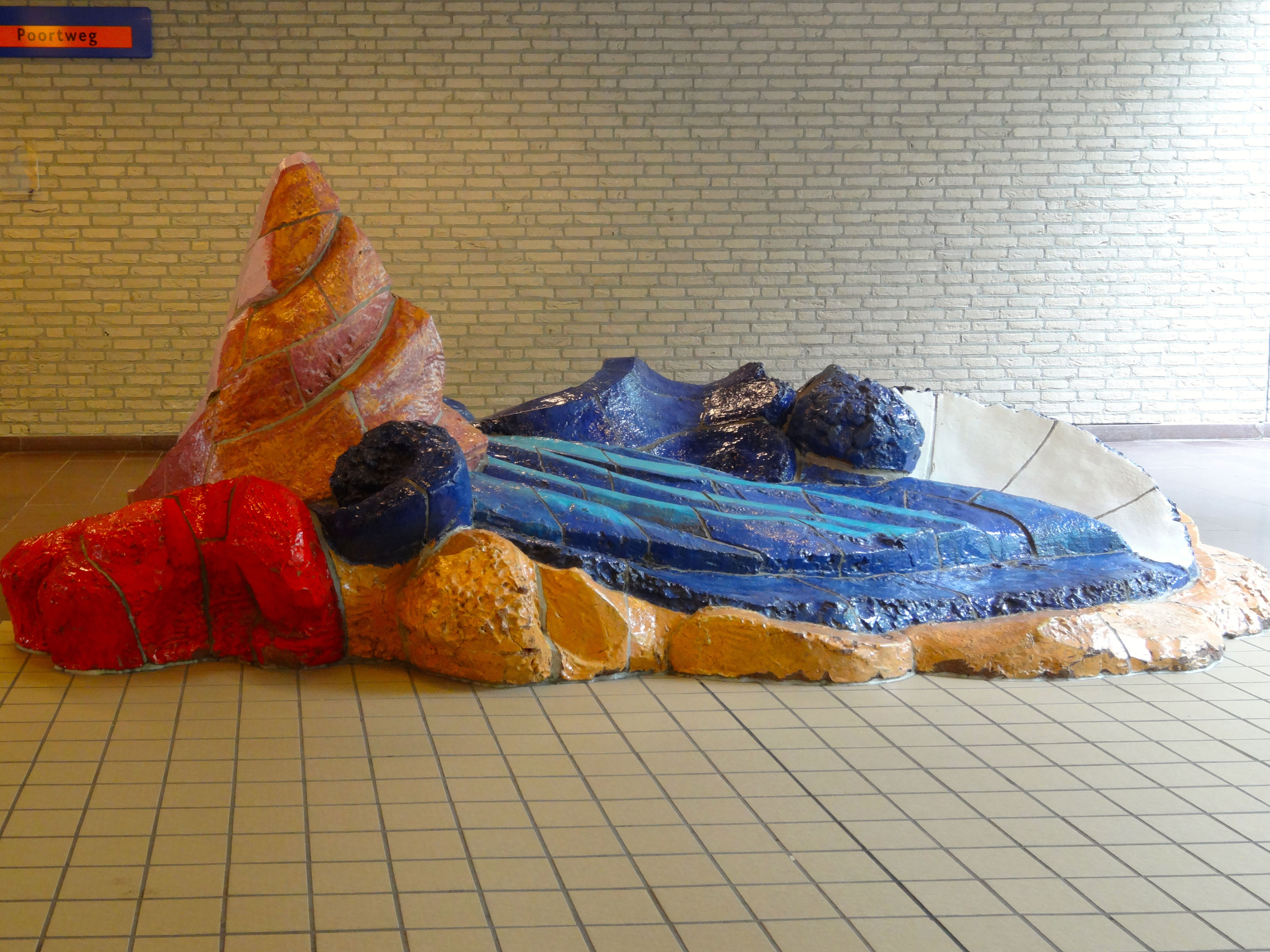
Floor mosaic, Groningen

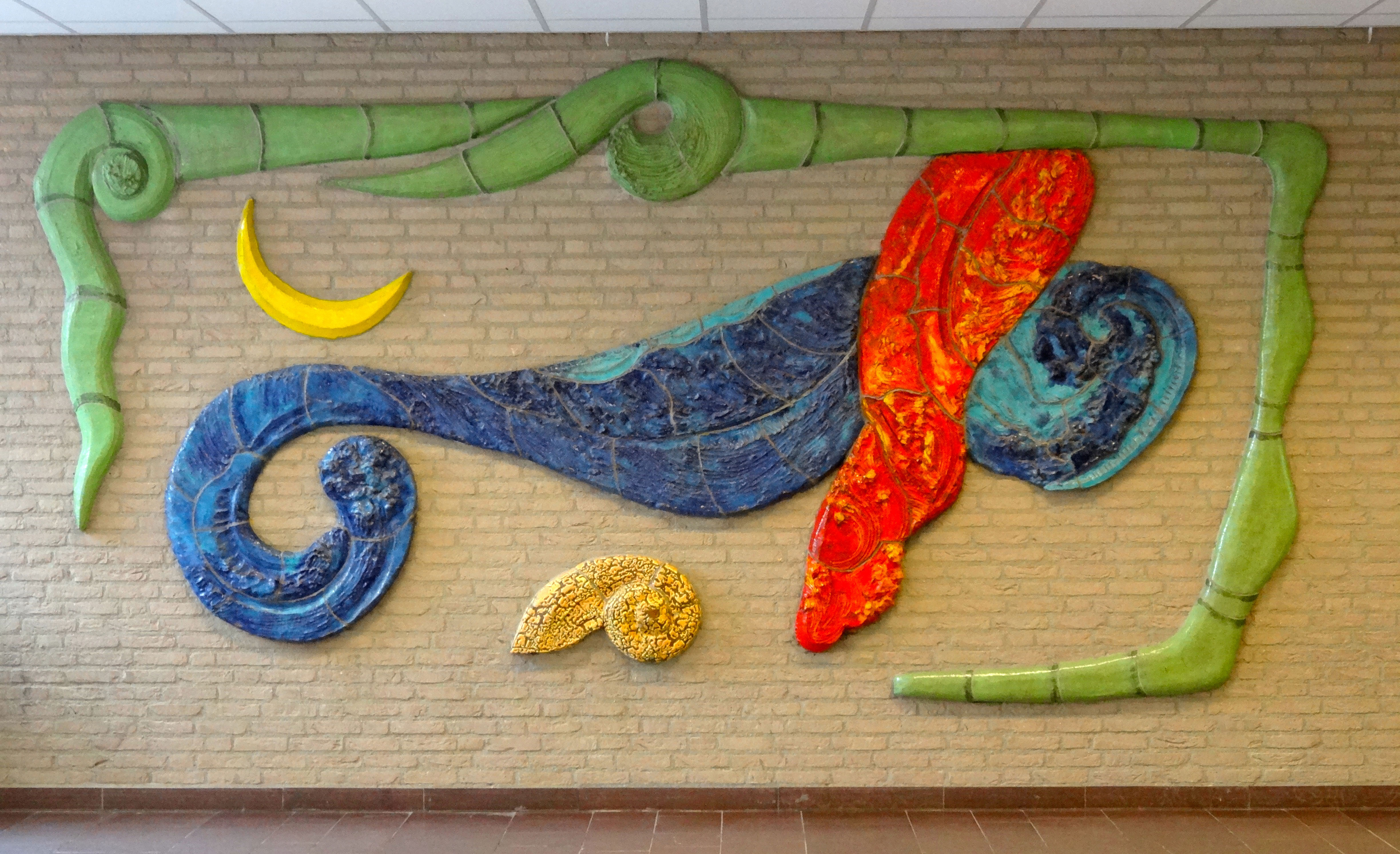
Wall mosaic, Groningen

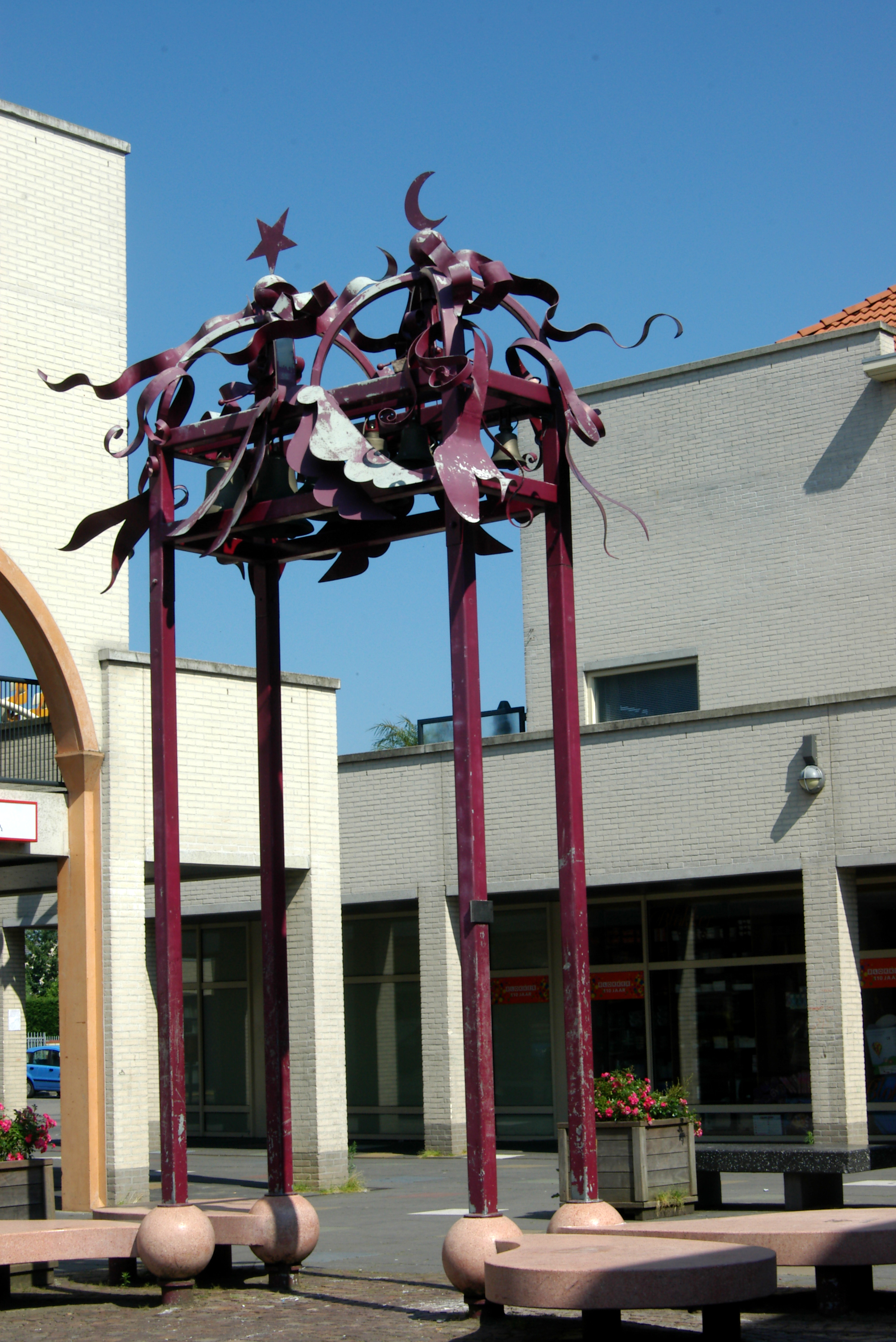
Clock-chair (1990), Tiel

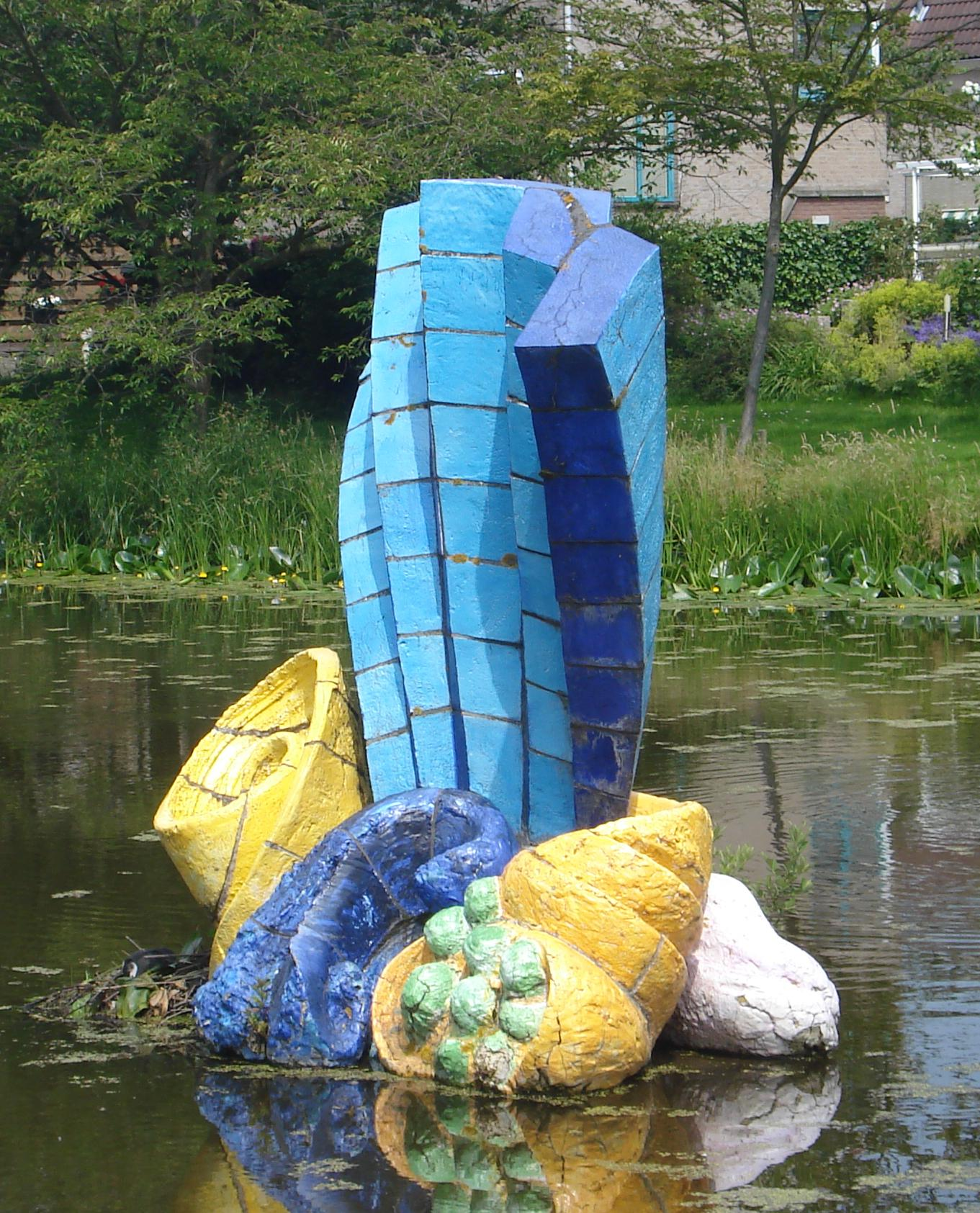
Vanitas, Wassenaar.

=== Fauteuils and chaise Longues ===
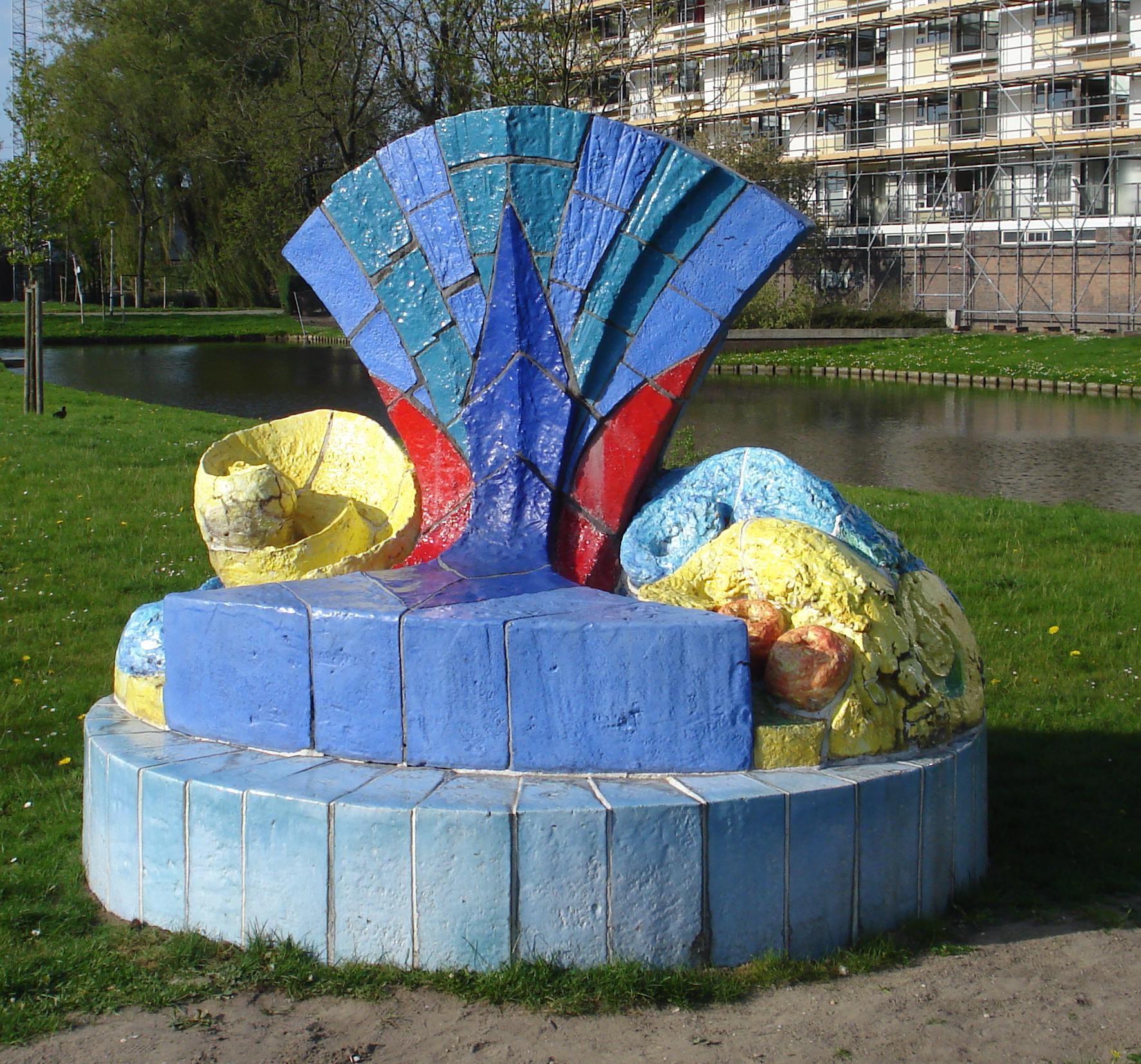
Fauteuil, Beukelsdijk, Rotterdam

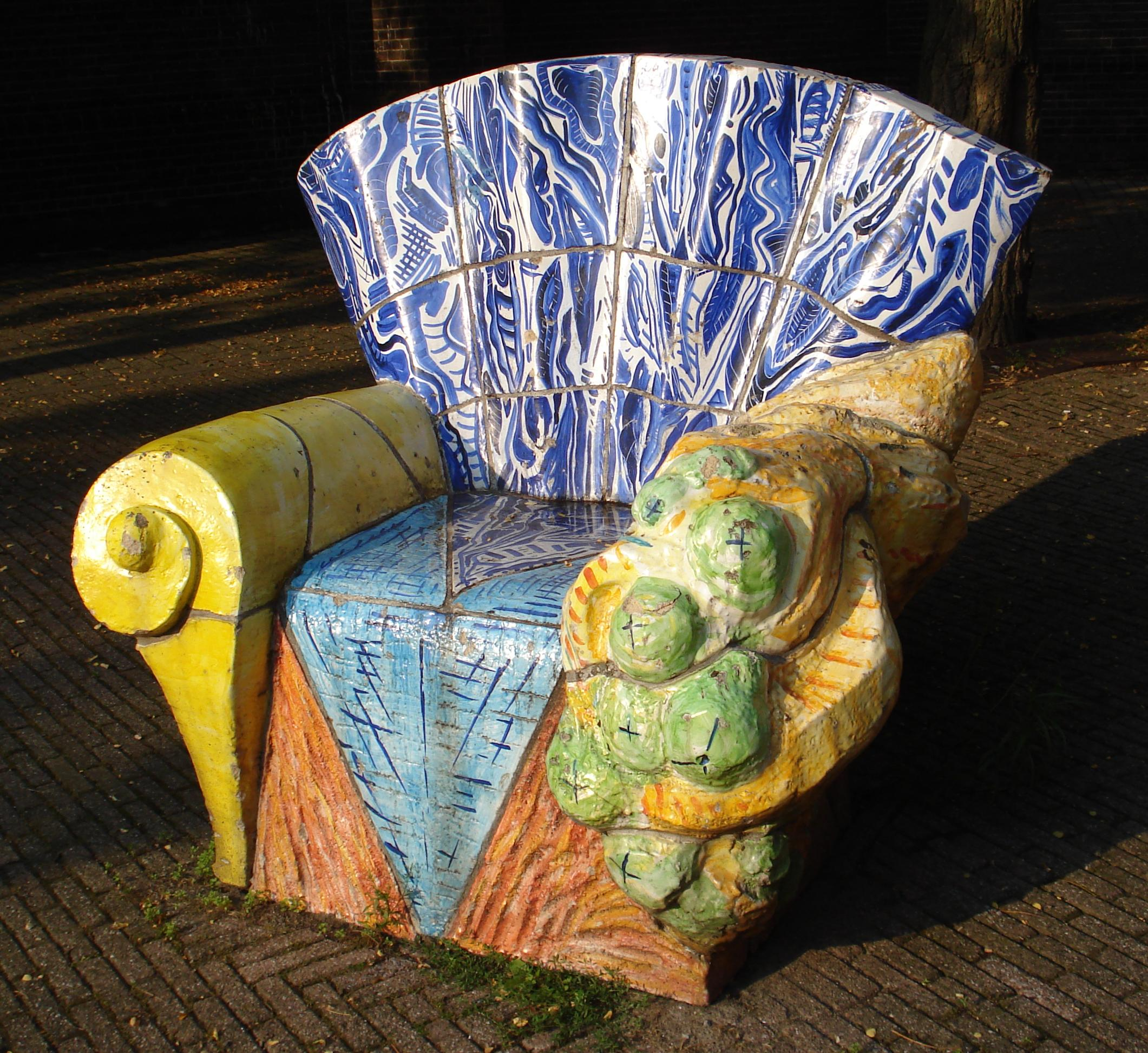
Fauteuili, Hildegardisstraat, Rotterdam

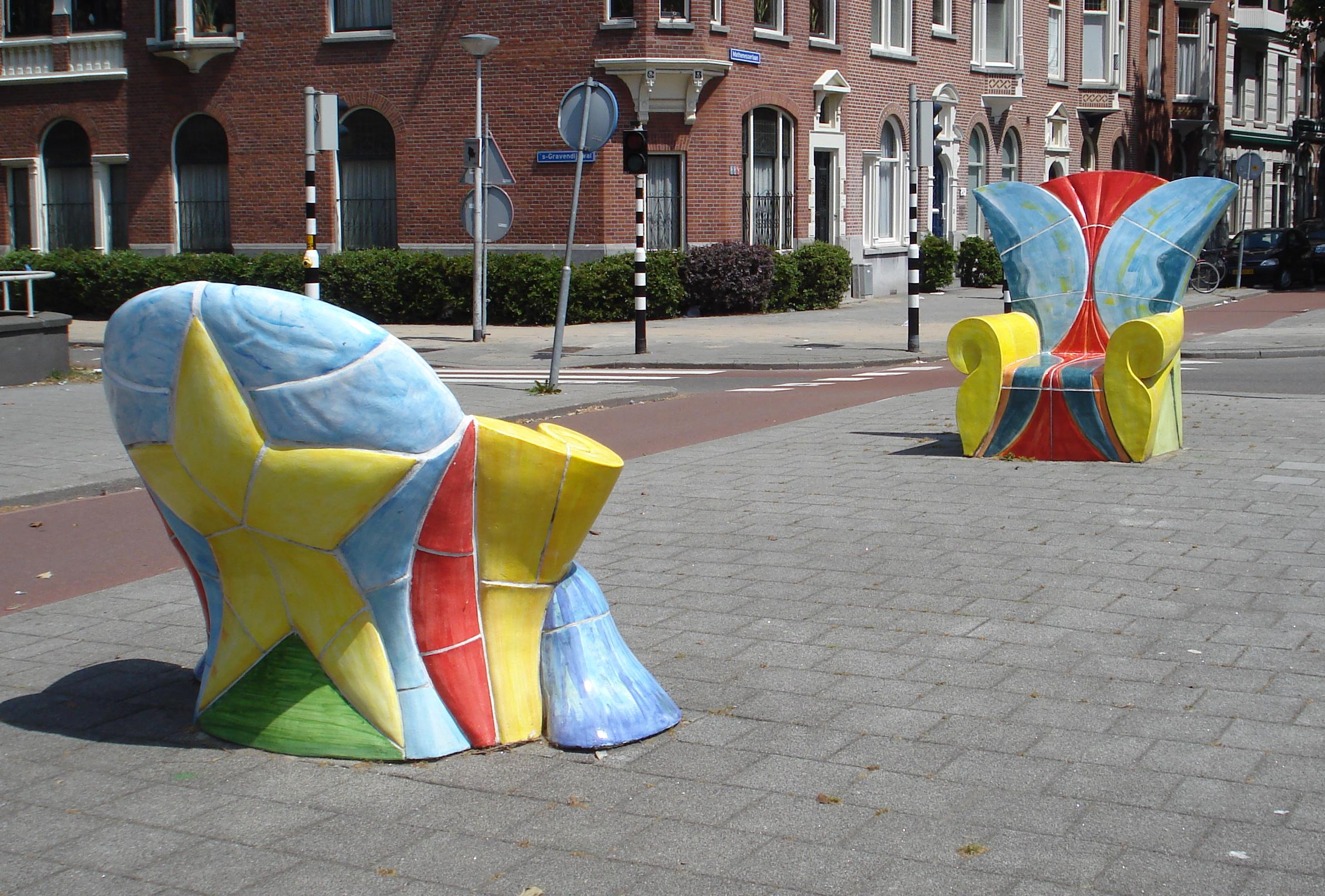
Fauteuil, 's-Gravendijkwal/Rochussenstraat, Rotterdam

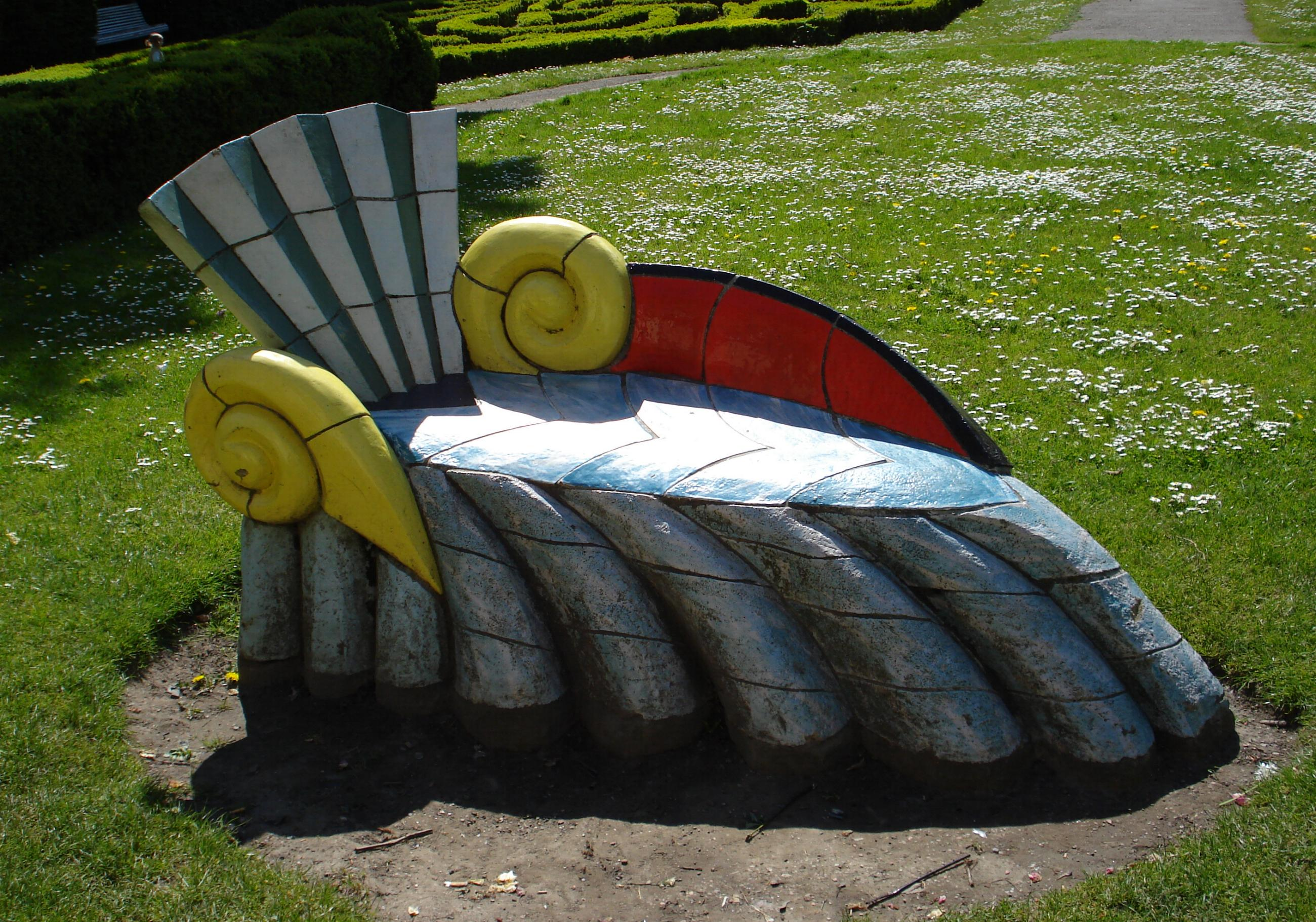
Chaise Longue in the park at the Euromast in Rotterdam

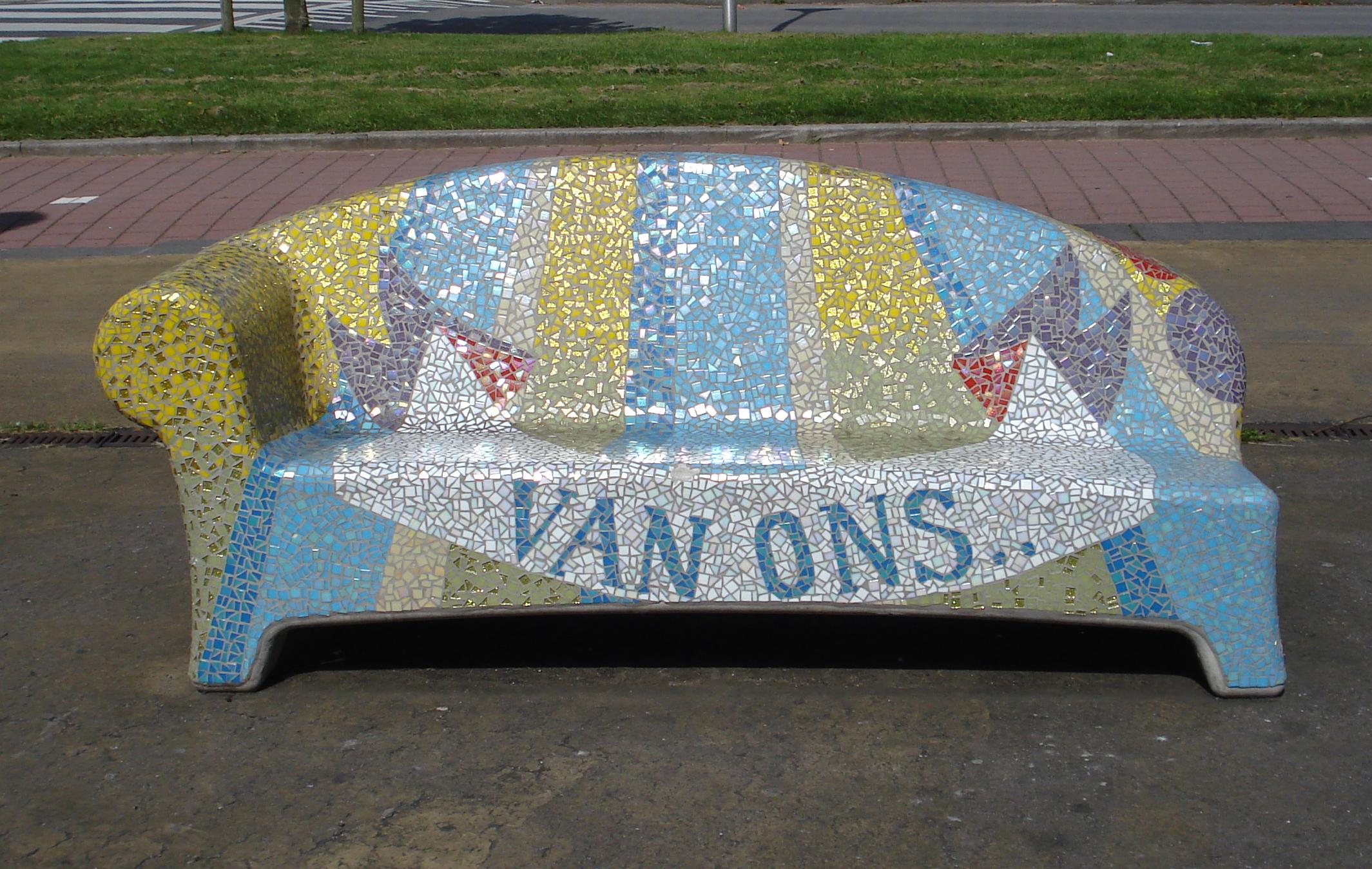
Chaise Longue in Pijnacker
