= Lee Hirsch =

American documentary filmmaker (born 1972)

- Born: 1972 (age 53–54)
- Occupation: Filmmaker
- Years active: 1993–present

Lee Hirsch (born 1972) is an American documentary filmmaker. Hirsch is a graduate of The Putney School in Vermont and Hampshire College, in Amherst, Massachusetts. He wrote and directed the documentary Amandla!: A Revolution in Four-Part Harmony.

Hirsch also contributed a chapter to Sound Unbound: Sampling Digital Music and Culture (The MIT Press, 2008), edited by Paul D. Miller (DJ Spooky).

His film Bully premiered at the 2011 Tribeca Film Festival. Bully follows several families from across ethnic, cultural and geographic boundaries as they grapple with the tragedy their family has faced as a result of bullying. Several of the families profiled in the film had lost a child because he or she became fed up with the mostly mental and sometimes physical abuse they experienced on a daily, even hourly basis at school, on the school bus, and in their communities.

In a screening of Bully in Minneapolis in September 2011, director Hirsch told the audience during the post-film Q & A that he himself had been bullied, and that was part of the inspiration for the film, and for the direction he took it. In an interview with Twin Cities Jewish news website TC Jewfolk after the screening Hirsch continued:

"I felt that the hardest part of being bullied was communicating," Hirsch said. "And getting help. I couldn’t enroll people's support. People would say things like 'get over it,' even my own father and mother. They weren’t with me. That was a big part of my wanting to make the film. It’s cathartic on a daily basis." Hirsch said he hoped the film grows far beyond him, inspiring advocacy, engagement, and empowerment not just in people who are being bullied and in their families, but by those of us who all too often stand by and do nothing. He stated, "I hope we build something that’s really sustainable. I hope this takes on a life of its own." Hirsch is Jewish.

In a Google+ Hangout on March 19, 2012, Lee Hirsch was interviewed by newscaster Tony McEwing at My Fox 11 LA studios, where Hirsch said: "I want this to be a grassroots movement so that the local cities can get behind this movie and support it. This is a great way for people to get involved on social media to help raise awareness." The New York Times described Bully as "moving and troubling".
