= Name Me Lawand =

- Directed by: Edward Lovelace
- Starring: Lawand Hamad Amin
- Release date: 2022
- Running time: 91 minutes
- Language: Kurdish

Name Me Lawand is a documentary film directed by Edward Lovelace about Lawand Hamad Amin, a deaf boy who moves from Iraq to Derby, who risks deportation from the UK.

The film won a Special Jury Prize from the Best International Feature Documentary award jury at the 2023 Hot Docs Canadian International Documentary Festival.

== See also ==
- Lawand (given name)
