= Tonje Hessen Schei =

Norwegian director and producer

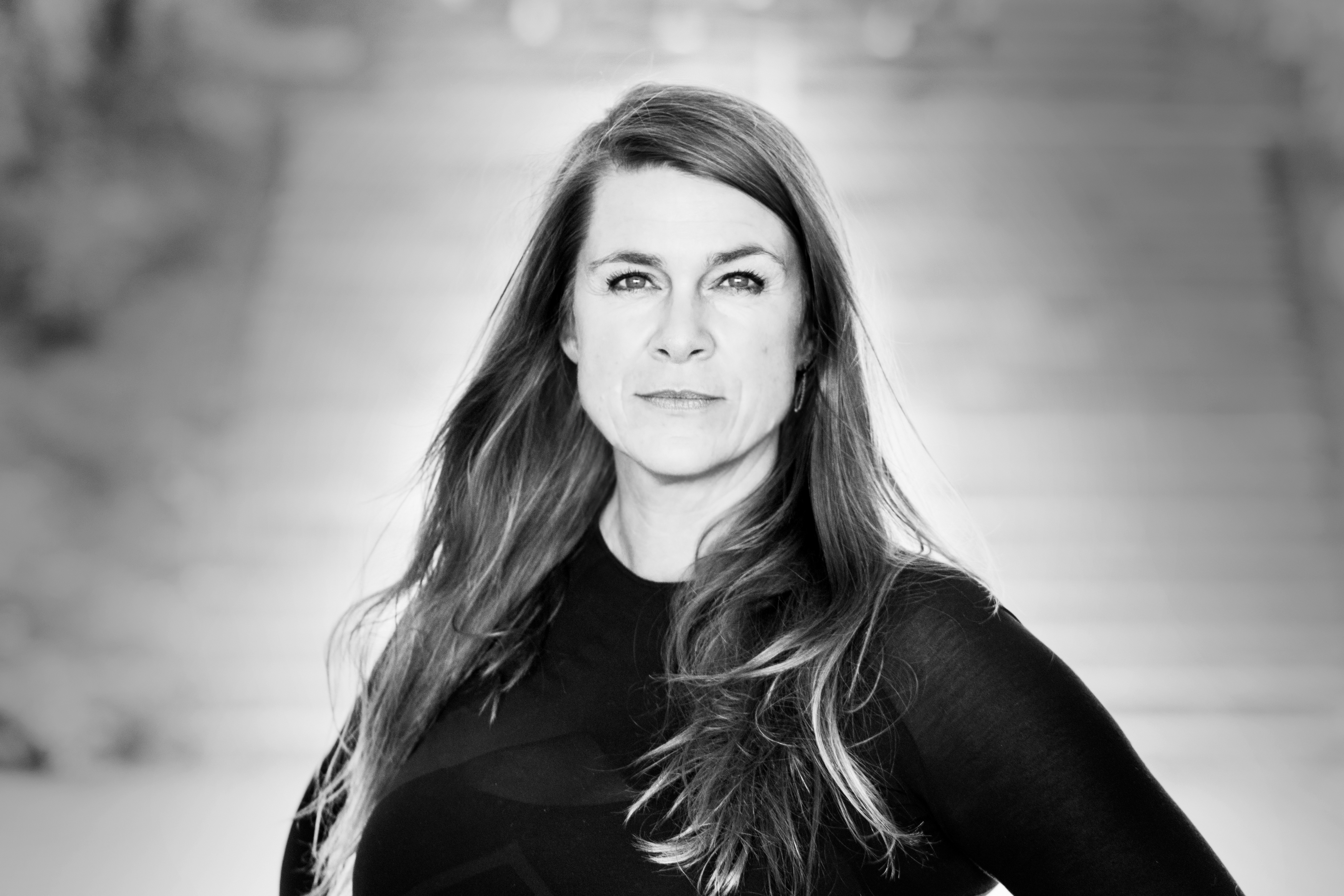
- Hessen Schei photographed by Marte Garmann in 2022
- Born: 1971 (age 54–55)
- Education: University of Texas, Norwegian University of Science and Technology
- Occupations: Film producer, film director

Tonje Hessen Schei is a Norwegian film director, producer and screenwriter who has been making independent documentary films since 1996. Her films mostly take on international issues that question systems of power.

Most recently, Hessen Schei directed Praying for Armageddon, a political thriller that investigates the dangerous consequences of the fusion between Evangelical Christianity and American politics. The film's worldwide premiere took place on 20 March 2023 at the CPH:DOX film festival in Copenhagen, Denmark. The film premiered at the Hamptons International Film Festival on 8 October 2023.

Hessen Schei also directed iHUMAN, a film about artificial intelligence, power and social control. It premiered at the IDFA in 2019 with sold-out theaters and a Doc Talk with Edward Snowden. iHUMAN won Best Norwegian Documentary at HUMAN International Documentary Film Festival in 2020. The film also had special high-level panel debates at Berlinale and Cannes, and was screened at the UN. iHUMAN qualified for the Oscar run in 2020.

Drone, a documentary Hessen Schei directed about the secret CIA drone warfare program, premiered in 2015.

== Filmography ==
Film	Year	Director	Producer	Writer
Praying for Armageddon	2023	Yes	Yes	No
iHuman	2019	Yes	Yes	No
Privacy of Wounds	2018	No	Yes	No
Drone	2014	Yes	No	Yes
Play Again	2010	Yes	No	No
Independent Intervention	2006	Yes	Yes	No

== See also ==
- Arne Birkenstock
- Brandon Bryant
- Government by algorithm
- Regulation of algorithms
