= Primetime Emmy Award for Outstanding Variety Series =

American television award

- Awarded for: Outstanding Variety, Music, or Comedy Series
- Country: United States
- Presented by: Academy of Television Arts & Sciences
- First award: 1951
- Currently held by: The Late Show with Stephen Colbert (2026)
- Website: emmys.com

The Primetime Emmy Award for Outstanding Variety Series is a category at the Primetime Emmy Awards. It is awarded annually to the best variety show or similarly formatted program of the year. The award was previously known as "Outstanding Comedy-Variety or Music Program" and "Outstanding Variety, Music, or Comedy Series".

== History ==
From 1979 to 1989 and in 1991, variety series and specials competed together. Single programs dominated as winners during this time until the Outstanding Variety Special category was created. Starting in 1994, all of the winners in this category have been late-night talk shows, except in 1997.

The Daily Show with Jon Stewart won the award for ten years consecutively (2003–2012), the longest winning streak for a television show in Primetime Emmys history. In 2015, this category was separated into two categories, Outstanding Variety Sketch Series and Outstanding Talk Series.

In 2026, the split was reversed and the category returned at the 78th Primetime Emmy Awards with the two categories being merged.

== Winners and nominations ==
=== 1950s ===
Year	Program	Network
Best Variety Show
1951 (3rd)
1951 (3rd)	The Alan Young Show	KTTV
1951 (3rd)	Four Star Revue	KNBH
1951 (3rd)	The Ken Murray Show	KTTV
1951 (3rd)	Texaco Star Theater	KNBH
1951 (3rd)	Your Show of Shows	KNBH
1952 (4th)
1952 (4th)	Your Show of Shows	NBC
1952 (4th)	All Star Revue	NBC
1952 (4th)	The Colgate Comedy Hour	NBC
1952 (4th)	The Fred Waring Show	CBS
1952 (4th)	Toast of the Town	CBS
Best Variety Program
1953 (5th)
1953 (5th)	Your Show of Shows	NBC
1953 (5th)	Arthur Godfrey and His Friends	CBS
1953 (5th)	The Colgate Comedy Hour	NBC
1953 (5th)	The Jackie Gleason Show	CBS
1953 (5th)	Toast of the Town	CBS
1954 (6th)
1954 (6th)	Omnibus	CBS
1954 (6th)	The Colgate Comedy Hour	NBC
1954 (6th)	The Jackie Gleason Show	CBS
1954 (6th)	Toast of the Town	CBS
1954 (6th)	Your Show of Shows	NBC
Best Variety Series Including Musical Varieties
1955 (7th)
1955 (7th)	Disneyland	ABC
1955 (7th)	The Ed Sullivan Show	CBS
1955 (7th)	The George Gobel Show	NBC
1955 (7th)	The Jack Benny Program	CBS
1955 (7th)	The Jackie Gleason Show	CBS
1955 (7th)	Your Show of Shows	NBC
1956 (8th) (Note: In 1956, two separate series categories were presented, Best Variety Series and Best Music Series, and an award was given in each category. The Ed Sullivan Show won Best Variety Series, while Your Hit Parade won Best Music Series.)
1956 (8th)	Best Variety Series	
1956 (8th)	The Ed Sullivan Show	CBS
1956 (8th)	The Dinah Shore Show	NBC
1956 (8th)	Ford Star Jubilee	CBS
1956 (8th)	The Perry Como Show	NBC
1956 (8th)	Shower of Stars	CBS
1956 (8th)	Best Music Series	
1956 (8th)	Your Hit Parade	NBC
1956 (8th)	Coke Time with Eddie Fisher	NBC
1956 (8th)	The Dinah Shore Show	NBC
1956 (8th)	The Perry Como Show	NBC
1956 (8th)	The Voice of Firestone	CBS
1957 (9th) (Note: In 1957, two separate series categories were presented, Best Series – Half Hour or Less and Best Series – One Hour or More, and an award was given in each category. The Phil Silvers Show, a comedy, won Best Series – Half Hour or Less, while Caesar's Hour, another comedy, won Best Series – One Hour or More. For this ceremony (and also in 1965), variety shows competed directly against comedies, dramas, and other shows.)
1957 (9th)	Best Series – Half Hour or Less	
1957 (9th)	The Phil Silvers Show (comedy)	CBS
1957 (9th)	Alfred Hitchcock Presents (anthology)	CBS
1957 (9th)	Father Knows Best (comedy)	NBC
1957 (9th)	The Jack Benny Program (comedy)	CBS
1957 (9th)	Person to Person (interview)	CBS
1957 (9th)	Best Series – One Hour or More	
1957 (9th)	Caesar's Hour (comedy)	NBC
1957 (9th)	Climax! (drama)	CBS
1957 (9th)	The Ed Sullivan Show (musical variety)	CBS
1957 (9th)	Omnibus (educational)	CBS
1957 (9th)	The Perry Como Show (musical variety)	NBC
Best Musical, Variety, Audience Participation or Quiz Series
1958 (10th)
1958 (10th)	The Dinah Shore Chevy Show	NBC
1958 (10th)	The Ed Sullivan Show	CBS
1958 (10th)	The Perry Como Show	NBC
1958 (10th)	The Steve Allen Show	NBC
1958 (10th)	Tonight Starring Jack Paar	NBC
Best Musical or Variety Series
1959 (11th)
1959 (11th)	The Dinah Shore Chevy Show	NBC
1959 (11th)	The Perry Como Show	NBC
1959 (11th)	The Steve Allen Show	NBC

=== 1960s ===
Year	Program	Producers	Network
Outstanding Program Achievement in the Field of Variety
1960 (12th)
1960 (12th)	The Fabulous Fifties		CBS
1960 (12th)	Another Evening with Fred Astaire		NBC
1960 (12th)	The Dinah Shore Chevy Show		NBC
1960 (12th)	The Garry Moore Show		CBS
1960 (12th)	The Revlon Revue		CBS
1961 (13th)
1961 (13th)	Astaire Time		NBC
1961 (13th)	Belafonte, N.Y.		CBS
1961 (13th)	The Garry Moore Show		CBS
1961 (13th)	An Hour with Danny Kaye		CBS
1961 (13th)	The Jack Paar Tonight Show		NBC
Outstanding Program Achievements in the Fields of Variety and Music - Variety
1962 (14th)
1962 (14th)	The Garry Moore Show		CBS
1962 (14th)	Here's Edie		ABC
1962 (14th)	The Judy Garland Show		CBS
1962 (14th)	Perry Como's Kraft Music Hall		NBC
1962 (14th)	Walt Disney's Wonderful World of Color		NBC
Outstanding Program Achievement in the Field of Variety
1963 (15th)
1963 (15th)	The Andy Williams Show		NBC
1963 (15th)	Carol and Company		CBS
1963 (15th)	The Garry Moore Show		CBS
1963 (15th)	Here's Edie		ABC
1963 (15th)	The Red Skelton Hour		CBS
1964 (16th)
1964 (16th)	The Danny Kaye Show		CBS
1964 (16th)	The Andy Williams Show		NBC
1964 (16th)	The Garry Moore Show		CBS
1964 (16th)	The Judy Garland Show		CBS
1964 (16th)	The Tonight Show Starring Johnny Carson		NBC
Outstanding Program Achievements in Entertainment
1965 (17th)
1965 (17th)	The Dick Van Dyke Show (Season 4)	Carl Reiner, producer	CBS
1965 (17th)	Hallmark Hall of Fame: "The Magnificent Yankee"	George Schaefer, producer	NBC
1965 (17th)	My Name Is Barbra	Richard Lewine, producer	CBS
1965 (17th)	New York Philharmonic Young People's Concerts with Leonard Bernstein	Roger Englander, producer	CBS
1965 (17th)	The Andy Williams Show	Bob Finkel, producer	NBC
1965 (17th)	Bob Hope Presents the Chrysler Theatre	Dick Berg, producer	NBC
1965 (17th)	A Carol for Another Christmas	Joseph L. Mankiewicz, producer	ABC
1965 (17th)	The Defenders	Bob Markell, producer	CBS
1965 (17th)	Hallmark Hall of Fame	George Schaefer, producer	NBC
1965 (17th)	The Man from U.N.C.L.E.	Sam Rolfe, producer	NBC
1965 (17th)	Mr. Novak	Leonard Freeman, producer	NBC
1965 (17th)	Profiles in Courage	Robert Saudek, producer	NBC
1965 (17th)	Walt Disney's Wonderful World of Color	Walt Disney, producer	NBC
1965 (17th)	Who Has Seen the Wind?	George Sidney, producer	ABC
1965 (17th)	The Wonderful World of Burlesque	George Schaefer, producer	NBC
Outstanding Variety Series
1966 (18th)
1966 (18th)	The Andy Williams Show	Bob Finkel, producer	NBC
1966 (18th)	The Danny Kaye Show	Robert Scheerer, producer	CBS
1966 (18th)	The Hollywood Palace	William O. Harbach and Nick Vanoff, producers	ABC
1966 (18th)	The Red Skelton Hour	Seymour Berns, producer	CBS
1966 (18th)	The Tonight Show Starring Johnny Carson	Art Stark, producer	NBC
1967 (19th)
1967 (19th)	The Andy Williams Show	Edward Stephenson and Bob Finkel, producers	NBC
1967 (19th)	The Dean Martin Show	Greg Garrison, producer	NBC
1967 (19th)	The Hollywood Palace	Nick Vanoff and William O. Harbach, producers	ABC
1967 (19th)	The Jackie Gleason Show	Ronald Wayne, producer	CBS
1967 (19th)	The Smothers Brothers Comedy Hour	Saul Ilson and Ernest Chambers, producers	CBS
1967 (19th)	The Tonight Show Starring Johnny Carson	Art Stark, producer	NBC
Outstanding Musical or Variety Series
1968 (20th)
1968 (20th)	Rowan & Martin's Laugh-In	George Schlatter, producer	NBC
1968 (20th)	The Bell Telephone Hour	Henry Jaffe, executive producer; Robert Drew, Mike Jackson and Mel Stuart, producers	NBC
1968 (20th)	The Carol Burnett Show	Joe Hamilton, producer	CBS
1968 (20th)	The Dean Martin Show	Greg Garrison, producer	NBC
1968 (20th)	The Smothers Brothers Comedy Hour	Saul Ilson and Ernest Chambers, producers	CBS
Outstanding Variety or Musical Series
1969 (21st)
1969 (21st)	Rowan & Martin's Laugh-In	Paul Keyes and Carolyn Raskin, producers; Dick Martin and Dan Rowan, stars	NBC
1969 (21st)	The Carol Burnett Show	Joe Hamilton, producer; Carol Burnett, star	CBS
1969 (21st)	The Dean Martin Show	Greg Garrison, producer; Dean Martin, star	NBC
1969 (21st)	The Smothers Brothers Comedy Hour	Allan Blye and George Sunga, producers; Tom Smothers and Dick Smothers, stars	CBS
1969 (21st)	That's Life	Marvin Marx and Stan Harris, producers; Robert Morse, star	ABC

=== 1970s ===
Year	Program	Producers	Network
Outstanding Variety or Musical Series
1970 (22nd)
1970 (22nd)	The David Frost Show	Peter Baker, producer; David Frost, star	Syndicated
1970 (22nd)	The Carol Burnett Show	Joe Hamilton, producer; Carol Burnett, star	CBS
1970 (22nd)	The Dean Martin Show	Greg Garrison, producer; Dean Martin, star	NBC
1970 (22nd)	The Dick Cavett Show	Jack Rollins, executive producer; Tony Converse, producer; Dick Cavett, star	ABC
1970 (22nd)	Rowan & Martin's Laugh-In	George Schlatter, executive producer; Carolyn Raskin and Paul Keyes, producers; Dan Rowan and Dick Martin, stars	NBC
1971 (23rd)
1971 (23rd)	Outstanding Variety Series – Musical		
1971 (23rd)	The Flip Wilson Show	Monte Kay, executive producer; Bob Henry, producer; Flip Wilson, star	NBC
1971 (23rd)	The Carol Burnett Show	Joe Hamilton, executive producer; Arnie Rosen, producer; Carol Burnett, star	CBS
1971 (23rd)	Rowan & Martin's Laugh-In	George Schlatter, executive producer; Carolyn Raskin, producer; Dick Martin and Dan Rowan, stars	NBC
1971 (23rd)	Outstanding Variety Series – Talk		
1971 (23rd)	The David Frost Show	Peter Baker, producer; David Frost, star	Syndicated
1971 (23rd)	The Dick Cavett Show	Jack Rollins, executive producer; John Gilroy, producer; Dick Cavett, star	ABC
1971 (23rd)	The Tonight Show Starring Johnny Carson	Rudy Tellez and Frederick De Cordova, producers; Johnny Carson, host	NBC
1972 (24th)
1972 (24th)	Outstanding Variety Series – Musical		
1972 (24th)	The Carol Burnett Show	Joe Hamilton (executive producer), Arnie Rosen (producer), Carol Burnett (star)	CBS
1972 (24th)	The Dean Martin Show	Greg Garrison (producer), Dean Martin (star)	NBC
1972 (24th)	The Flip Wilson Show	Monte Kay (executive producer), Bob Henry (producer), Flip Wilson (star)	
1972 (24th)	The Sonny & Cher Comedy Hour	Allan Blye (producer), Chris Bearde (producer), Sonny Bono (star), Cher (star)	CBS
1972 (24th)	Outstanding Variety Series – Talk		
1972 (24th)	The Dick Cavett Show	John Gilroy (producer), Dick Cavett (star)	ABC
1972 (24th)	The David Frost Show	Peter Baker (producer), David Frost (star)	Syndicated
1972 (24th)	The Tonight Show Starring Johnny Carson	Frederick De Cordova (producer), Johnny Carson (host)	NBC
Outstanding Variety Musical Series
1973 (25th)
1973 (25th)	The Julie Andrews Hour	Nick Vanoff (producer), William O. Harbach (producer), Julie Andrews (star)	ABC
1973 (25th)	The Carol Burnett Show	Joe Hamilton (executive producer), Bill Angelos (producer), Buz Kohan (producer), Arnie Rosen (producer), Carol Burnett (star)	CBS
1973 (25th)	The Dick Cavett Show	John Gilroy (producer), Dick Cavett (star)	ABC
1973 (25th)	The Flip Wilson Show	Monte Kay (executive producer), Bob Henry (producer), Flip Wilson (star)	NBC
1973 (25th)	The Sonny & Cher Comedy Hour	Allan Blye (producer), Chris Bearde (producer), Sonny Bono (star), Cher (star)	CBS
Outstanding Music-Variety Series
1974 (26th)
1974 (26th)	The Carol Burnett Show	Joe Hamilton (executive producer), Ed Simmons, Carol Burnett (star)	CBS
1974 (26th)	The Sonny & Cher Comedy Hour	Allan Blye (producer), Chris Bearde (producer), Sonny Bono (star), Cher (star)	CBS
1974 (26th)	The Tonight Show Starring Johnny Carson	Johnny Carson (star), Frederick De Cordova (producer)	NBC
1975 (27th)
1975 (27th)	Outstanding Comedy-Variety or Music Series		
1975 (27th)	The Carol Burnett Show	Joe Hamilton (executive producer), Ed Simmons (producer), Carol Burnett (star)	CBS
1975 (27th)	Cher	George Schlatter (producer), Cher (star)	CBS
1975 (27th)	Special Classification of Outstanding Program and Individual Achievement (Note: As a juried award, nominees had to receive 50% approval to win the award. The nominee did not meet the benchmark and the award was not given.)		
1975 (27th)	The Dick Cavett Show	John Gilroy, producer; Dick Cavett, star	ABC
Outstanding Comedy-Variety or Music Series
1976 (28th)
1976 (28th)	Saturday Night Live (Season 1)	Lorne Michaels (producer)	NBC
1976 (28th)	The Carol Burnett Show	Joe Hamilton (executive producer), Ed Simmons (producer), Carol Burnett (host)	CBS
1977 (29th)
1977 (29th)	Outstanding Comedy-Variety or Music Series		
1977 (29th)	Van Dyke and Company	Byron Paul (executive producer), Allan Blye (producer), Bob Einstein (producer), Dick Van Dyke (star)	NBC
1977 (29th)	The Carol Burnett Show	Joe Hamilton (executive producer), Ed Simmons (producer), Carol Burnett (star)	CBS
1977 (29th)	Evening at Pops	William Cosel (producer), Arthur Fiedler (star)	PBS
1977 (29th)	The Muppet Show (Season 1)	Jim Henson (executive producer),David Lazer (executive producer), Jack Burns (producer), Frank Oz (star), Richard Hunt (star), Dave Goelz (star), Eren Ozker (star), John Lovelady (star), Jerry Nelson (star)	Syndicated
1977 (29th)	Saturday Night Live (Season 2)	Lorne Michaels (producer)	NBC
1977 (29th)	Special Classification of Outstanding Program Achievement		
1977 (29th)	The Tonight Show Starring Johnny Carson	Frederick De Cordova, producer; Johnny Carson, star	NBC
1977 (29th)	Bicentennial Minutes	Bob Markell, executive producer; Paul Waigner, producer	CBS
1977 (29th)	Life Goes to the Movies (The Big Event)	Jack Haley, executive producer; Malcolm Leo, Richard Schickel and Mel Stuart, producers	NBC
1977 (29th)	NBC: The First Fifty Years (The Big Event)	Greg Garrison, executive producer; Chet Hagan and Lee Hale, producers	NBC
1977 (29th)	The Wonderful World of Disney	Ron W. Miller, executive producer	NBC
Outstanding Comedy-Variety or Music Series
1978 (30th)
1978 (30th)	The Muppet Show (Season 2)	David Lazer (executive producer), Jim Henson (producer/star), Frank Oz (star), Jerry Nelson (star), Richard Hunt (star), Dave Goelz (star)	Syndicated
1978 (30th)	America 2-Night	Alan Thicke (producer)	Syndicated
1978 (30th)	The Carol Burnett Show	Joe Hamilton (executive producer), Ed Simmons (producer), Carol Burnett (star)	CBS
1978 (30th)	Evening at Pops	William Cosel (producer), Arthur Fiedler (star)	PBS
1978 (30th)	Saturday Night Live (Season 3)	Lorne Michaels (producer)	NBC
Outstanding Comedy-Variety or Music Program
1979 (31st)
1979 (31st)	Steve & Eydie Celebrate Irving Berlin	Steve Lawrence (executive producer/star), Gary Smith (executive producer/producer), Dwight Hemion (producer), Eydie Gormé (star)	NBC
1979 (31st)	Arthur Fiedler: Just Call Me Maestro (Evening at Pops)	William Cosel (producer), Arthur Fiedler (star)	PBS
1979 (31st)	The Muppet Show (Season 3)	David Lazer (executive producer), Jim Henson (producer/star: The Muppets), Frank Oz (star: The Muppets), Jerry Nelson (star: The Muppets), Richard Hunt (star: The Muppets), Dave Goelz (star: The Muppets)	Syndicated
1979 (31st)	Saturday Night Live (Season 4)	Lorne Michaels (producer), Dan Aykroyd (star), John Belushi (star), Jane Curtin (star), Garrett Morris (star), Bill Murray (star), Laraine Newman (star), Gilda Radner (star)	NBC
1979 (31st)	Shirley MacLaine at the Lido	Gary Smith (producer), Dwight Hemion (producer), Shirley MacLaine (star)	CBS

=== 1980s ===
Year	Program	Producers	Network
Outstanding Variety, Music or Comedy Program
1980 (32nd)
1980 (32nd)	Baryshnikov on Broadway	Herman Krawitz (executive producer), Gary Smith (producer), Dwight Hemion (producer), Mikhail Baryshnikov (star)	ABC
1980 (32nd)	The Benny Hill Show	Philip Jones (executive producer), Keith Beckett (producer), David Bell (producer), Ronald Fouracre (producer), Peter Frazer-Jones (producer), Dennis Kirkland (producer), John Robins (producer), Mark Stuart (producer), Benny Hill (star)	Syndicated
1980 (32nd)	Goldie and Liza Together	George Schlatter (executive producer), Don Mischer (producer), Fred Ebb (producer), Goldie Hawn (star), Liza Minnelli (star)	CBS
1980 (32nd)	The Muppet Show	David Lazer (executive producer), Jim Henson (producer/performer), Dave Goelz (performer), Louise Gold (performer), Richard Hunt (performer), Kathryn Mullen (performer), Jerry Nelson (performer), Frank Oz (performer), Steve Whitmire (performer)	Syndicated
1980 (32nd)	Shirley MacLaine... "Every Little Movement"	Gary Smith (producer), Dwight Hemion (producer), Shirley MacLaine (star)	CBS
1981 (33rd)
1981 (33rd)	Lily: Sold Out	Lily Tomlin (executive producer/star), Jane Wagner (executive producer), Rocco Urbisci (producer)	CBS
1981 (33rd)	AFI Life Achievement Award: A Tribute to Fred Astaire	George Stevens Jr. (producer)	CBS
1981 (33rd)	The Benny Hill Show	John Robins (producer), Dennis Kirkland (producer), Mark Stuart (producer), Keith Beckett (producer), Benny Hill (star)	Syndicated
1981 (33rd)	The Muppet Show	David Lazer (executive producer), Jim Henson (producer/performer), Frank Oz (performer), Jerry Nelson (performer), Richard Hunt (performer), Dave Goelz (performer), Louise Gold (performer), Steve Whitmire (performer), Kathryn Mullen (performer), Brian Muehl (performer) and Karen Prell (performer)	Syndicated
1981 (33rd)	The Tonight Show Starring Johnny Carson	Frederick De Cordova (producer), Peter Lassally (co-producer), Johnny Carson (star)	NBC
1982 (34th)
1982 (34th)	Night of 100 Stars	Alexander H. Cohen (executive producer), Hildy Parks (producer), Roy A. Somlyo (co-producer)	ABC
1982 (34th)	AFI Life Achievement Award: A Tribute to Frank Capra	George Stevens Jr. (producer)	CBS
1982 (34th)	Ain't Misbehavin'	Alvin Cooperman (producer/executive producer), Buddy Bregman (producer)	NBC
1982 (34th)	Baryshnikov in Hollywood	Herman Krawitz (executive producer), Don Mischer (producer), Mikhail Baryshnikov (star)	CBS
1982 (34th)	SCTV Network	Andrew Alexander (executive producer), Doug Holtby (executive producer), Len Stuart (executive producer), Jack E. Rhodes (executive producer), Patrick Whitley (supervising producer), Barry Sand (producer), Don Novello (producer), Nic Wry (co-producer)	NBC
1983 (35th)
1983 (35th)	Motown 25: Yesterday, Today, Forever	Suzanne De Passe (executive producer), Don Mischer (producer), Buz Kohan (producer), Suzanne Coston (producer for Motown)	NBC
1983 (35th)	The 37th Annual Tony Awards	Alexander H. Cohen (executive producer), Hildy Parks (producer), Roy A. Somlyo (co-producer)	CBS
1983 (35th)	The Kennedy Center Honors: A Celebration of the Performing Arts	George Stevens Jr., Nick Vanoff (producer)	CBS
1983 (35th)	SCTV Network	Andrew Alexander (senior executive producer/executive producer), Len Stuart (executive producer), Jack E. Rhodes (executive producer), Doug Holtby (executive producer), Patrick Whitley (supervising producer/producer), Nancy Geller (producer), Don Novello (producer)	NBC
1983 (35th)	The Tonight Show Starring Johnny Carson	Frederick De Cordova (producer), Peter Lassally (co-producer), Johnny Carson (host)	NBC
1984 (36th)
1984 (36th)	The Kennedy Center Honors: A Celebration of the Performing Arts	Nick Vanoff (producer), George Stevens Jr.	CBS
1984 (36th)	The 38th Annual Tony Awards	Alexander H. Cohen (executive producer), Hildy Parks (producer), Martha Mason (co-producer)	CBS
1984 (36th)	AFI Life Achievement Award: A Tribute to Lillian Gish	George Stevens Jr.	CBS
1984 (36th)	Late Night with David Letterman	Jack Rollins (executive producer), Barry Sand (producer), David Letterman (host)	NBC
1984 (36th)	The Tonight Show Starring Johnny Carson	Frederick De Cordova (executive producer), Peter Lassally (producer), Johnny Carson (host)	NBC
1985 (37th)
1985 (37th)	Motown Returns to the Apollo	Suzanne De Passe (executive producer), Don Mischer, Suzanne Coston (co-producer), Michael Weisbarth (co-producer)	NBC
1985 (37th)	AFI Life Achievement Award: A Tribute to Gene Kelly	George Stevens Jr. (producer)	CBS
1985 (37th)	Great Performances	Robert Manby (executive producer), Diane M. Gioia (supervising producer), Sherman Sneed (producer), Bill Siegler (coordinating producer), Lena Horne (star)	PBS
1985 (37th)	Late Night with David Letterman	Jack Rollins (executive producer), Barry Sand (producer), David Letterman (host)	NBC
1985 (37th)	The Tonight Show Starring Johnny Carson	Frederick De Cordova (executive producer), Peter Lassally (producer), Johnny Carson (host)	NBC
1986 (38th)
1986 (38th)	The Kennedy Center Honors: A Celebration of the Performing Arts	Nick Vanoff (producer), George Stevens Jr.	CBS
1986 (38th)	The 40th Annual Tony Awards	Alexander H. Cohen (executive producer), Hildy Parks (producer), Martha Mason (co-producer)	CBS
1986 (38th)	AFI Life Achievement Award: A Tribute to Billy Wilder	George Stevens Jr.	NBC
1986 (38th)	Late Night with David Letterman	Jack Rollins (executive producer), Barry Sand (producer), David Letterman (host)	NBC
1986 (38th)	The Tonight Show Starring Johnny Carson	Frederick De Cordova (executive producer), Peter Lassally (producer), Johnny Carson (host)	NBC
1987 (39th)
1987 (39th)	The 41st Annual Tony Awards	Don Mischer (executive producer), David J. Goldberg (producer)	CBS
1987 (39th)	Late Night with David Letterman	Jack Rollins (executive producer), David Letterman (executive producer/host), Barry Sand (producer)	NBC
1987 (39th)	Liberty Weekend	David L. Wolper (executive producer), Don Mischer (producer)	ABC
1987 (39th)	The Tonight Show Starring Johnny Carson	Frederick De Cordova (executive producer), Peter Lassally (producer), Johnny Carson (host)	NBC
1987 (39th)	The Tracey Ullman Show	James L. Brooks (executive producer), Jerry Belson (executive producer), Ken Estin (executive producer), Heide Perlman (executive producer), Richard Sakai (producer), Paul Flaherty (co-producer), Dick Blasucci (co-producer), Tracey Ullman (host)	Fox
1988 (40th)
1988 (40th)	Irving Berlin's 100th Birthday Celebration	Don Mischer (executive producer), Jan Cornell (producer), David J. Goldberg (producer), Sara Lukinson (co-producer)	CBS
1988 (40th)	Late Night with David Letterman	Jack Rollins (executive producer), David Letterman (executive producer/host), Robert Morton (producer)	NBC
1988 (40th)	Late Night with David Letterman 6th Anniversary Special	Jack Rollins (executive producer), David Letterman (executive producer/host), Robert Morton (producer)	NBC
1988 (40th)	The Smothers Brothers Comedy Hour	Tom Smothers (executive producer/host), Ken Kragen (producer), Dick Smothers (host)	CBS
1988 (40th)	The Tracey Ullman Show	James L. Brooks (executive producer), Heide Perlman (executive producer), Jerry Belson (executive producer), Ken Estin (executive producer), Richard Sakai (producer), Ted Bessell (producer), Marc Flanagan (co-producer), Tracey Ullman (host), Dick Blasucci (co-producer)	Fox
1989 (41st)
1989 (41st)	The Tracey Ullman Show	James L. Brooks (executive producer), Jerry Belson (executive producer), Heide Perlman (executive producer), Ken Estin (executive producer), Sam Simon (executive producer), Richard Sakai (producer), Ted Bessell (producer), Marc Flanagan (co-producer), Tracey Ullman (host)	Fox
1989 (41st)	The Arsenio Hall Show	Arsenio Hall (executive producer/host), Marla Kell Brown (producer)	Syndicated
1989 (41st)	Late Night with David Letterman	Jack Rollins (executive producer), David Letterman (executive producer/host), Robert Morton (producer)	NBC
1989 (41st)	Saturday Night Live (Season 14)	Lorne Michaels (executive producer), James Downey (producer)	NBC
1989 (41st)	Tap Dance in America (Great Performances)	Don Mischer (executive producer), Jac Venza (executive producer), David J. Goldberg (producer), Rhoda Grauer (producer), Gregory Hines (performer)	PBS

=== 1990s ===
Year	Program	Producers	Network
Outstanding Variety, Music or Comedy Series
1990 (42nd)
1990 (42nd)	In Living Color	Keenen Ivory Wayans (executive producer), Kevin Bright (supervising producer), Tamara Rawitt (producer), Michael Petok (co-producer)	Fox
1990 (42nd)	The Arsenio Hall Show	Arsenio Hall (executive producer/host), Marla Kell Brown (producer)	Syndicated
1990 (42nd)	Late Night with David Letterman	Jack Rollins (executive producer), David Letterman (executive producer/host), Robert Morton (producer)	NBC
1990 (42nd)	Saturday Night Live	Lorne Michaels (executive producer), James Downey (producer)	NBC
1990 (42nd)	The Tracey Ullman Show	Jerry Belson (executive producer), James L. Brooks (executive producer), Heide Perlman (executive producer), Sam Simon (executive producer), Marc Flanagan (supervising producer), Marilyn Suzanne Miller (senior producer), Richard Sakai (producer), Ted Bessell (producer), Dinah Kirgo (producer), Jay Kogen (co-producer), Wallace Wolodarsky (co-producer), Tracey Ullman (star)	Fox
Outstanding Variety, Music or Comedy Program
1991 (43rd)
1991 (43rd)	The 63rd Annual Academy Awards	Gilbert Cates (producer)	ABC
1991 (43rd)	In Living Color	Keenen Ivory Wayans (executive producer), Tamara Rawitt (producer), Michael Petok (co-producer)	Fox
1991 (43rd)	Late Night with David Letterman	Jack Rollins (executive producer), David Letterman (executive producer/host), Robert Morton (producer)	NBC
1991 (43rd)	The Tonight Show Starring Johnny Carson	Frederick De Cordova (executive producer), Peter Lassally (executive producer), Jeff Sotzing (producer), Jim McCawley (co-producer), Johnny Carson (host)	NBC
1991 (43rd)	The Kennedy Center Honors: A Celebration of the Performing Arts	George Stevens Jr. (producer), Nick Vanoff (producer)	CBS
1991 (43rd)	The Muppets Celebrate Jim Henson	Don Mischer (producer), Martin G. Baker (co-producer), David J. Goldberg (co-producer)	CBS
Outstanding Variety, Music or Comedy Series
1992 (44th)
1992 (44th)	The Tonight Show Starring Johnny Carson	Frederick De Cordova (executive producer), Peter Lassally (executive producer), Jeff Sotzing (producer), Jim McCawley (co-producer), Johnny Carson (host)	NBC
1992 (44th)	In Living Color	Keenen Ivory Wayans (executive producer), Tamara Rawitt (producer), Kevin Berg (co-producer)	Fox
1992 (44th)	Late Night with David Letterman	David Letterman (executive producer/host), Jack Rollins (executive producer), Robert Morton (producer)	NBC
1993 (45th)
1993 (45th)	Saturday Night Live	Lorne Michaels (executive producer), James Downey (producer), Al Franken (producer)	NBC
1993 (45th)	Late Night with David Letterman	Peter Lassally (executive producer), Robert Morton (co-executive producer), Jude Brennan (producer), David Letterman (host)	NBC
1993 (45th)	The Tonight Show with Jay Leno	Debbie Vickers (producer), Bill Royce (co-producer), Larry Goitia (line producer), Patti M. Grant (supervising producer), Jay Leno (host)	NBC
1993 (45th)	MTV Unplugged	Alex Coletti (producer)	MTV
1994 (46th)
1994 (46th)	Late Show with David Letterman	Peter Lassally (executive producer), Robert Morton (executive producer), Hal Gurnee (supervising producer), Jude Brennan (producer), David Letterman (host)	CBS
1994 (46th)	Dennis Miller Live	Kevin C. Slattery (producer), Jeff Cesario (producer), Dennis Miller (host)	HBO
1994 (46th)	Saturday Night Live	Lorne Michaels (executive producer), James Downey (producer)	NBC
1994 (46th)	The Tonight Show with Jay Leno	Debbie Vickers (producer), Bill Royce (co-producer), Patti M. Grant (supervising producer), Larry Goitia (line producer), Jay Leno (host)	NBC
1994 (46th)	MTV Unplugged	Joel Stillerman (executive producer), Alex Coletti (producer), Audrey Johns (line producer)	MTV
1995 (47th)
1995 (47th)	The Tonight Show with Jay Leno	Debbie Vickers (executive producer), Patti M. Grant (supervising producer), Larry Goitia (line producer), Bill Royce (co-producer), Jay Leno (host)	NBC
1995 (47th)	Late Show with David Letterman	Robert Morton (executive producer), Peter Lassally (executive producer), Hal Gurnee (supervising producer), Jude Brennan (producer), Rob Burnett (producer), David Letterman (host)	CBS
1995 (47th)	Dennis Miller Live	Dennis Miller (executive producer/host), Jeff Cesario (executive producer), Kevin C. Slattery (executive producer)	HBO
1995 (47th)	MTV Unplugged	Robert Small (executive producer), Carol Donovan (executive producer), Joel Stillerman (executive producer), Alex Coletti (producer), Audrey Johns (line producer), Drana Prekelezaj (line producer)	MTV
1995 (47th)	Politically Incorrect	Scott Carter (executive producer), Bill Maher (executive producer), Nancy Geller (co-executive producer), Sue Fellows (producer), Douglas M. Wilson (producer)	Comedy Central
1996 (48th)
1996 (48th)	Dennis Miller Live	Dennis Miller (executive producer/host), Kevin C. Slattery (executive producer), Eddie Feldmann	HBO
1996 (48th)	Late Show with David Letterman	Rob Burnett (executive producer), Jude Brennan (supervising producer), Jon Beckerman (supervising producer), Barbara Gaines, Joe Toplyn, Peter Lassally (executive producer), David Letterman (host)	CBS
1996 (48th)	Muppets Tonight	Brian Henson (executive producer), Dick Blasucci (executive producer), Alex Rockwell (co-executive producer), Paul Flaherty (supervising producer), Kirk R. Thatcher (supervising producer), Martin G. Baker, Patric M. Verrone (co-producer)	ABC
1996 (48th)	Politically Incorrect	Scott Carter (executive producer), Bill Maher (executive producer), Nancy Geller (executive producer), Douglas M. Wilson (supervising producer), Kevin Hamburger, Sue Fellows (consulting producer)	Comedy Central
1996 (48th)	The Tonight Show with Jay Leno	Jay Leno (host), Debbie Vickers (executive producer), Patti M. Grant (supervising producer), Larry Goitia (line producer)	NBC
1997 (49th)
1997 (49th)	Tracey Takes On...	Allan McKeown (executive producer), Tracey Ullman (executive producer), Jerry Belson (consulting producer), Dick Clement (supervising producer), Ian La Frenais (supervising producer), Carey Dietrich (producer), Thomas Schlamme (producer), Robert Klane (producer), Jenji Kohan (producer), Molly Newman (producer), Gail Parent (producer), Stephanie Laing (associate producer), Allen J. Zipper (coordinating producer)	HBO
1997 (49th)	Dennis Miller Live	Dennis Miller (executive producer), Kevin C. Slattery (executive producer), Eddie Feldmann, Michele DeVoe (associate producer), Colleen Grillo (consulting producer)	HBO
1997 (49th)	Late Show with David Letterman	Rob Burnett (executive producer), Jon Beckerman (supervising producer), Barbara Gaines (producer), Joe Toplyn (producer)	CBS
1997 (49th)	Politically Incorrect	Scott Carter (executive producer), Bill Maher (executive producer), Nancy Geller (executive producer), Bernie Brillstein (executive producer), Brad Grey (executive producer), Marc Gurvitz (executive producer), Douglas M. Wilson (senior producer), Kevin Hamburger (supervising producer)	Comedy Central (1996) / ABC (1997)
1997 (49th)	The Tonight Show with Jay Leno	Debbie Vickers (executive producer), Patti M. Grant (supervising producer), Larry Goitia (line producer)	NBC
1998 (50th)
1998 (50th)	Late Show with David Letterman	Rob Burnett (executive producer), Barbara Gaines, Maria Pope, Jon Beckerman (supervising producer)	CBS
1998 (50th)	Dennis Miller Live	Dennis Miller (executive producer), Kevin C. Slattery (executive producer), Eddie Feldmann (supervising producer), Colleen Grillo (co-ordinating producer)	HBO
1998 (50th)	Politically Incorrect	Scott Carter (executive producer), Nancy Geller (executive producer), Bill Maher (executive producer), Bernie Brillstein (executive producer), Brad Grey (executive producer), Marc Gurvitz (executive producer), Douglas M. Wilson (senior producer), Kevin Hamburger (supervising producer)	ABC
1998 (50th)	The Tonight Show with Jay Leno	Jay Leno (consulting producer), Debbie Vickers (executive producer), Patti M. Grant (supervising producer), Larry Goitia (line producer)	NBC
1998 (50th)	Tracey Takes On...	Tracey Ullman (executive producer), Allan McKeown (executive producer), Carey Dietrich, Stephanie Laing (co-ordinating producer), Dick Clement (supervising producer), Ian La Frenais (supervising producer), Gail Parent (supervising producer), Molly Newman (supervising producer), George McGrath (consulting producer), Jerry Belson (consulting producer)	HBO
1999 (51st)
1999 (51st)	Late Show with David Letterman	Rob Burnett (executive producer), Barbara Gaines, Maria Pope	CBS
1999 (51st)	Dennis Miller Live	Dennis Miller (executive producer), Kevin C. Slattery (executive producer), Eddie Feldmann (co-executive producer), David Feldman, Leah Krinsky, Colleen Grillo (coordinating producer)	HBO
1999 (51st)	Politically Incorrect	Scott Carter (executive producer), Bill Maher (executive producer), Nancy Geller (executive producer), Brad Grey (executive producer), Bernie Brillstein (executive producer), Marc Gurvitz (executive producer), Douglas M. Wilson (co-executive producer), Kevin Hamburger (supervising producer), Joy Dolce (coordinating producer)	ABC
1999 (51st)	The Tonight Show with Jay Leno	Jay Leno (consulting producer), Debbie Vickers (executive producer), Patti M. Grant (supervising producer), Larry Goitia (supervising producer)	NBC
1999 (51st)	Tracey Takes On...	Allan McKeown (executive producer), Tracey Ullman (executive producer), Stephanie Laing, Jerry Belson (consulting producer), George McGrath (consulting producer), Dick Clement (supervising producer), Ian La Frenais (supervising producer), Gail Parent (supervising producer), Jenji Kohan (supervising producer)	HBO

=== 2000s ===
Year	Program	Producers	Network
Outstanding Variety, Music or Comedy Series
2000 (52nd)
2000 (52nd)	Late Show with David Letterman	Rob Burnett (executive producer), Barbara Gaines, Maria Pope	CBS
2000 (52nd)	The Chris Rock Show	Chris Rock (executive producer), Michael Rotenberg (executive producer), Nancy Geller (executive producer), Sue Fellows (co-executive producer), Jeff Stilson (supervising producer), Liz Stanton	HBO
2000 (52nd)	Dennis Miller Live	Dennis Miller (executive producer), Kevin C. Slattery (executive producer), Eddie Feldmann (co-executive producer), David Feldman, Leah Krinsky, Michele DeVoe, Colleen Grillo	HBO
2000 (52nd)	Politically Incorrect	Douglas M. Wilson (executive producer), Bill Maher (executive producer), Nancy Geller (executive producer), Brad Grey (executive producer), Bernie Brillstein (executive producer), Marc Gurvitz (executive producer), Scott Carter (executive producer), Kevin Hamburger (co-executive producer), Sheila Griffiths (executive producer), Jerry Nachman (executive producer), Michael Wilson (supervising producer), Marilyn Wilson (executive producer)	ABC
2000 (52nd)	The Tonight Show with Jay Leno	Debbie Vickers (executive producer), Patti M. Grant (supervising producer), Larry Goitia (supervising producer), Jay Leno	NBC
2001 (53rd)
2001 (53rd)	Late Show with David Letterman	Maria Pope (executive producer), Barbara Gaines (executive producer), Rob Burnett (executive producer), Eric Stangel (producer), Justin Stangel (producer)	CBS
2001 (53rd)	The Chris Rock Show	Chris Rock (executive producer), Michael Rotenberg (executive producer), Nancy Geller (executive producer), Sue Fellows (co-executive producer), Ali LeRoi (supervising producer), Jeff Stilson (supervising producer), Liz Stanton (producer)	HBO
2001 (53rd)	The Daily Show with Jon Stewart	Madeleine Smithberg (executive producer), Jon Stewart (co-executive producer), Kahane Cooperman (supervising producer)	Comedy Central
2001 (53rd)	Politically Incorrect	Bill Maher (executive producer), Nancy Geller (executive producer), Bernie Brillstein (executive producer), Brad Grey (executive producer), Marc Gurvitz (executive producer), Kevin Hamburger (executive producer), Marilyn Wilson (executive producer), Jerry Nachman (executive producer), Sheila Griffiths (supervising producer), Dean E. Johnsen (producer), Carole Chouinard (producer)	ABC
2001 (53rd)	Saturday Night Live	Lorne Michaels (executive producer), Ken Aymong (supervising producer), Steve Higgins (producer)	NBC
2002 (54th)
2002 (54th)	Late Show with David Letterman	Rob Burnett, Barbara Gaines and Maria Pope, executive producers; Eric Stangel and Justin Stangel, producers	CBS
2002 (54th)	The Daily Show with Jon Stewart	Madeleine Smithberg, executive producer; Jon Stewart, co-executive producer; Stewart Bailey, Kahane Corn and Ben Karlin, supervising producers	Comedy Central
2002 (54th)	Politically Incorrect	Bernie Brillstein, Nancy Geller, Brad Grey, Marc Gurvitz, Kevin Hamburger, Bill Maher and Marilyn Wilson, executive producers; Sheila Griffiths, supervising producer; Carole Chouinard, Dean E. Johnsen and Billy Martin, producers	ABC
2002 (54th)	Saturday Night Live	Lorne Michaels, executive producer; Ken Aymong, supervising producer; Steve Higgins, producer	NBC
2002 (54th)	The Tonight Show with Jay Leno	Debbie Vickers, executive producer; Larry Goitia and Patti Grant, supervising producers; Jay Leno, producer	NBC
2003 (55th)
2003 (55th)	The Daily Show with Jon Stewart	Madeleine Smithberg and Jon Stewart, executive producers; Stewart Bailey and Ben Karlin, co-executive producers; Kahane Corn, supervising producers	Comedy Central
2003 (55th)	Late Night with Conan O'Brien	Lorne Michaels and Jeff Ross, executive producers; Daniel Ferguson and Frank Smiley, supervising producers; Tracy King, producer	NBC
2003 (55th)	Late Show with David Letterman	Jude Brennan, Rob Burnett, Barbara Gaines and Maria Pope, executive producers; Jerry Foley, Matt Roberts, Sheila Rogers, Eric Stangel and Justin Stangel, producers	CBS
2003 (55th)	Saturday Night Live	Lorne Michaels, executive producer; Ken Aymong, supervising producer; Marci Klein and Michael Shoemaker, producers; Steve Higgins, produced by	NBC
2003 (55th)	The Tonight Show with Jay Leno	Debbie Vickers, executive producer; Larry Goitia and Patti Grant, supervising producers; Jay Leno, producer	NBC
2004 (56th)
2004 (56th)	The Daily Show with Jon Stewart	Ben Karlin and Jon Stewart, executive producers; Stewart Bailey, co-executive producer; Kahane Corn and David Javerbaum, supervising producers	Comedy Central
2004 (56th)	Chappelle's Show	Michele Armour, Neal Brennan and Dave Chappelle, executive producers	Comedy Central
2004 (56th)	Late Night with Conan O'Brien	Lorne Michaels and Jeff Ross, executive producers; Daniel Ferguson and Frank Smiley, supervising producers; Tracy King, producer	NBC
2004 (56th)	Late Show with David Letterman	Jude Brennan, Rob Burnett, Barbara Gaines and Maria Pope, executive producers; Jerry Foley, Matt Roberts, Sheila Rogers, Eric Stangel and Justin Stangel, producers	CBS
2004 (56th)	Saturday Night Live	Lorne Michaels, executive producer; Ken Aymong, supervising producer; Marci Klein and Michael Shoemaker, producers; Steve Higgins, produced by	NBC
2005 (57th)
2005 (57th)	The Daily Show with Jon Stewart	Ben Karlin and Jon Stewart, executive producers; Stewart Bailey, co-executive producer; Kahane Corn and David Javerbaum, supervising producers	Comedy Central
2005 (57th)	Da Ali G Show	Sacha Baron Cohen, Peter Fincham and Dan Mazer, executive producers; Jeff Stilson, supervising producer; Erin O'Malley, producer	HBO
2005 (57th)	Late Night with Conan O'Brien	Lorne Michaels and Jeff Ross, executive producers; Daniel Ferguson and Frank Smiley, supervising producers; Tracy King, producer	NBC
2005 (57th)	Late Show with David Letterman	Jude Brennan, Rob Burnett, Barbara Gaines and Maria Pope, executive producers; Jerry Foley and Matt Roberts, supervising producers; Sheila Rogers, Eric Stangel and Justin Stangel, producers	CBS
2005 (57th)	Real Time with Bill Maher	Scott Carter, Brad Grey, Sheila Griffiths, Marc Gurvitz and Bill Maher, executive producers; Dean E. Johnsen, supervising producer; Billy Martin, producer	HBO
2006 (58th)
2006 (58th)	The Daily Show with Jon Stewart	Ben Karlin and Jon Stewart, executive producers; Stewart Bailey and Kahane Corn, co-executive producers; David Javerbaum, supervising producer	Comedy Central
2006 (58th)	The Colbert Report	Stephen Colbert, Ben Karlin and Jon Stewart, executive producers; Rich Dahm and Allison Silverman, supervising producers	Comedy Central
2006 (58th)	Late Night with Conan O'Brien	Lorne Michaels and Jeff Ross, executive producers; Daniel Ferguson and Frank Smiley, supervising producers; Tracy King, producer	NBC
2006 (58th)	Late Show with David Letterman	Jude Brennan, Rob Burnett, Barbara Gaines and Maria Pope, executive producers; Jerry Foley and Matt Roberts, supervising producers; Sheila Rogers, Eric Stangel and Justin Stangel, producers	CBS
2006 (58th)	Real Time with Bill Maher	Scott Carter, Brad Grey, Sheila Griffiths, Marc Gurvitz and Bill Maher, executive producers; Dean E. Johnsen and Billy Martin, co-executive producers	HBO
2007 (59th)
2007 (59th)	The Daily Show with Jon Stewart	Jon Stewart, Ben Karlin and David Javerbaum, executive producers; Kahane Corn and Josh Lieb, co-executive producers; Rory Albanese, Jim Margolis, supervising producers	Comedy Central
2007 (59th)	The Colbert Report	Jon Stewart, Stephen Colbert and Ben Karlin, executive producers; Meredith Bennett, Allison Silverman and Richard Dahm, co-executive producers	Comedy Central
2007 (59th)	Late Night with Conan O'Brien	Lorne Michaels and Jeff Ross, executive producers; Frank Smiley and Daniel Ferguson, supervising producers; Tracy King, producer	NBC
2007 (59th)	Late Show with David Letterman	Barbara Gaines, Maria Pope, Jude Brennan and Rob Burnett, executive producers; Jerry Foley and Matt Roberts, supervising producers; Eric Stangel, Justin Stangel and Sheila Rogers, producers	CBS
2007 (59th)	Real Time with Bill Maher	Bill Maher, Scott Carter, Sheila Griffiths, Brad Grey and Marc Gurvitz, executive producers; Dean E. Johnsen and Billy Martin, co-executive producers	HBO
2008 (60th)
2008 (60th)	The Daily Show with Jon Stewart	Jon Stewart (executive producer), David Javerbaum (executive producer), Rory Albanese (co-executive producer), Kahane Cooperman (co-executive producer), Josh Lieb (co-executive producer), Jim Margolis (supervising producer), Jennifer Flanz (supervising producer)	Comedy Central
2008 (60th)	The Colbert Report	Jon Stewart (executive producer), Stephen Colbert (executive producer), Allison Silverman (executive producer), Meredith Bennett (co-executive producer), Rich Dahm (co-executive producer), Tom Purcell (supervising producer)	Comedy Central
2008 (60th)	Late Show with David Letterman	Barbara Gaines (executive producer), Maria Pope (executive producer), Jude Brennan (executive producer), Rob Burnett (executive producer), Jerry Foley (supervising producer), Matt Roberts (supervising producer), Eric Stangel (producer), Justin Stangel (producer), Sheila Rogers (producer)	CBS
2008 (60th)	Real Time with Bill Maher	Bill Maher (executive producer), Scott Carter (executive producer), Sheila Griffiths (executive producer), Brad Grey (executive producer), Marc Gurvitz (executive producer), Billy Martin (executive producer), Dean E. Johnsen (co-executive producer)	HBO
2008 (60th)	Saturday Night Live	Lorne Michaels (executive producer), Steve Higgins (produced by), Ken Aymong (supervising producer), Michael Shoemaker (producer), Marci Klein (producer)	NBC
2009 (61st)
2009 (61st)	The Daily Show with Jon Stewart	Jon Stewart, host/executive producer; David Javerbaum, Rory Albanese and Josh Lieb, executive producers; Kahane Corn, co-executive producer; Jennifer Flanz, Jim Margolis, Steve Bodow and Adam Lowitt, supervising producers; Jill Katz, producer	Comedy Central
2009 (61st)	The Colbert Report	Stephen Colbert, executive producer/host; Jon Stewart and Allison Silverman, executive producers; Rich Dahm, Meredith Bennett and Tom Purcell, co-executive producers	Comedy Central
2009 (61st)	Late Show with David Letterman	Barbara Gaines, Maria Pope, Jude Brennan and Rob Burnett, executive producers; Jerry Foley and Matt Roberts, supervising producers; Eric Stangel, Justin Stangel and Sheila Rogers, producers; David Letterman, host	CBS
2009 (61st)	Real Time with Bill Maher	Bill Maher, executive producer/host; Scott Carter, Sheila Griffiths, Brad Grey, Marc Gurvitz and Billy Martin, executive producers; Dean E. Johnsen, co-executive producer	HBO
2009 (61st)	Saturday Night Live	Lorne Michaels, executive producer; Ken Aymong, supervising producer; Michael Shoemaker and Marci Klein, producers; Steve Higgins, produced by	NBC

=== 2010s ===
Year	Program	Producers	Network
Outstanding Variety, Music or Comedy Series
2010 (62nd)
2010 (62nd)	The Daily Show with Jon Stewart	Jon Stewart, executive producer/host; Rory Albanese and Josh Lieb, executive producers; Kahane Cooperman, co-executive producer; Steve Bodow, Jennifer Flanz, Hillary Kun, Adam Lowitt and Jim Margolis, supervising producers; Jill Katz, producer	Comedy Central
2010 (62nd)	The Colbert Report	Stephen Colbert, executive producer/host; Jon Stewart and Allison Silverman, executive producers; Tom Purcell, Meredith Bennett and Rich Dahm, co-executive producers; Tanya Bracco and Emily Lazar, supervising producers	Comedy Central
2010 (62nd)	Real Time with Bill Maher	Bill Maher, executive producer/host; Scott Carter, Sheila Griffiths, Brad Grey, Marc Gurvitz and Billy Martin, executive producers; Dean E. Johnsen, co-executive producer	HBO
2010 (62nd)	Saturday Night Live	Lorne Michaels, executive producer; Steve Higgins, produced by; Marci Klein, producer; Ken Aymong, supervising producer	NBC
2010 (62nd)	The Tonight Show with Conan O'Brien	Conan O'Brien, host; Jeff Ross, executive producer; Frank Smiley, Daniel Ferguson and Rachel Witlieb Bernstein, supervising producers; Tracy King, producer	NBC
2011 (63rd)
2011 (63rd)	The Daily Show with Jon Stewart	Jon Stewart, executive producer/host; Rory Albanese and Josh Lieb, executive producers; Kahane Cooperman, Steve Bodow, Jennifer Flanz and Jim Margolis, co-executive producers; Pamela DePace, Hillary Kun and Adam Lowitt, supervising producers; Jill Katz, producer	Comedy Central
2011 (63rd)	The Colbert Report	Stephen Colbert, executive producer/host; Jon Stewart and Tom Purcell, executive producers; Meredith Bennett and Rich Dahm, co-executive producers; Tanya Michnevich Bracco; Emily Lazar, Barry Julien and Paul Dinello, supervising producers	Comedy Central
2011 (63rd)	Conan	Jeff Ross, executive producer; Tracy King and Mike Sweeney, producers; Frank Smiley, Daniel Ferguson and Rachel Witlieb Bernstein, supervising producers; Conan O'Brien, host	TBS
2011 (63rd)	Late Night with Jimmy Fallon	Lorne Michaels, executive producer; Michael Shoemaker, producer; Gavin Purcell, supervising producer; Jimmy Fallon, host	NBC
2011 (63rd)	Real Time with Bill Maher	Bill Maher, executive producer/host; Scott Carter, Sheila Griffiths, Brad Grey, Marc Gurvitz and Billy Martin, executive producers; Dean E. Johnsen, produced by	HBO
2011 (63rd)	Saturday Night Live	Lorne Michaels, executive producer; Steve Higgins, produced by; Ken Aymong, supervising producer	NBC
Outstanding Variety Series
2012 (64th)
2012 (64th)	The Daily Show with Jon Stewart	Jon Stewart, executive producer/host; Rory Albanese, executive producer; Kahane Cooperman, Steve Bodow, Jennifer Flanz, Adam Lowitt and Jim Margolis, co-executive producers; Pamela DePace, Hillary Kun, Timothy Greenberg and Stuart Miller, supervising producers; Jill Katz, producer	Comedy Central
2012 (64th)	The Colbert Report	Stephen Colbert, executive producer/host; Jon Stewart and Tom Purcell, executive producers; Meredith Bennett and Rich Dahm, co-executive producers; Paul Dinello, Barry Julien, Matt Lappin, Emily Lazar and Tanya Michnevich Bracco, supervising producers	Comedy Central
2012 (64th)	Jimmy Kimmel Live!	Jimmy Kimmel, executive producer/host; Jill Leiderman, executive producer; Doug DeLuca, Erin Irwin and Jason Schrift, co-executive producers; Ken Crosby and Jennifer Sharron, producers; David Craig, produced by	ABC
2012 (64th)	Late Night with Jimmy Fallon	Lorne Michaels, executive producer; Hillary Hunn, Jamie Granet Bederman and Katie Hockmeyer, supervising producers; Gavin Purcell, producer; Michael Shoemaker, produced by; Jimmy Fallon, host	NBC
2012 (64th)	Real Time with Bill Maher	Bill Maher, executive producer/host; Scott Carter, Sheila Griffiths, Brad Grey, Marc Gurvitz and Billy Martin, executive producers; Dean E. Johnsen, co-executive producer	HBO
2012 (64th)	Saturday Night Live	Lorne Michaels, executive producer; Ken Aymong, supervising producer; Erik Kenward and John Mulaney, producers; Steve Higgins, produced by	NBC
2013 (65th)
2013 (65th)	The Colbert Report	Stephen Colbert (host/executive producer), Tom Purcell (executive producer), Jon Stewart (executive producer), Meredith Bennett (co-executive producer), Rich Dahm (co-executive producer), Barry Julien (co-executive producer), Tanya Michnevich (supervising producer), Emily Lazar (supervising producer), Paul Dinello (supervising producer), Matt Lappin (supervising producer)	Comedy Central
2013 (65th)	The Daily Show with Jon Stewart	Jon Stewart (host/executive producer), Rory Albanese (executive producer), Steve Bodow (co-executive producer), Kahane Cooperman (co-executive producer), Jennifer Flanz (co-executive producer), Adam Lowitt (co-executive producer), Tim Carvell (supervising producer), Pamela DePace (supervising producer), Timothy Greenberg (supervising producer), Hillary Kun (supervising producer), Stuart Miller (supervising producer), Jill Katz (producer)	Comedy Central
2013 (65th)	Jimmy Kimmel Live!	Jimmy Kimmel (host/executive producer), Jill Leiderman (executive producer), Doug DeLuca (co-executive producer), Jason Schrift (co-executive producer), Erin Irwin (co-executive producer), David Craig (producer), Jennifer Sharron (producer), Tony Romero (producer), Molly McNearney (producer), Gary Greenberg (producer), Josh Weintraub (producer), Ken Crosby (producer)	ABC
2013 (65th)	Late Night with Jimmy Fallon	Lorne Michaels (executive producer), Jamie Granet (supervising producer), Rob Crabbe (supervising producer), Katie Hockmeyer (supervising producer), Hillary Selesnick Hunn (supervising producer), Jim Juvonen (supervising producer), Gavin Purcell (producer), Michael Shoemaker (producer), Jimmy Fallon, host	NBC
2013 (65th)	Real Time with Bill Maher	Bill Maher (executive producer), Scott Carter (executive producer), Sheila Griffiths (executive producer), Brad Grey (executive producer), Marc Gurvitz (executive producer), Billy Martin (executive producer), Dean E. Johnsen (co-executive producer), Matt Wood (producer)	HBO
2013 (65th)	Saturday Night Live	Lorne Michaels (executive producer), Steve Higgins (producer), Erik Kenward (producer), Ken Aymong (supervising producer), Lindsay Shookus (producer), Erin Doyle (producer)	NBC
2014 (66th)
2014 (66th)	The Colbert Report	Stephen Colbert, executive producer/host; Jon Stewart and Tom Purcell, executive producer; Meredith Bennett, Emily Lazar, Barry Julien and Richard Dahm, co-executive producers; Tanya Bracco, Paul Dinello and Matt Lappin, supervising producers	Comedy Central
2014 (66th)	The Daily Show with Jon Stewart	Jon Stewart, executive producer/host; Steve Bodow, Jennifer Flanz, Adam Lowitt and Rory Albanese, executive producers; Tim Greenberg, Hillary Kun and Tim Carvell, co-executive producers; Pamela DePace, Justin Melkmann and Stuart Miller, supervising producers; Kahane Cooperman and Jill Katz, producers	Comedy Central
2014 (66th)	Jimmy Kimmel Live!	Jimmy Kimmel, executive producer/host; Jill Leiderman, executive producer; Doug DeLuca, Jason Schrift and Erin Irwin, co-executive producers; David Craig, Producer; Molly McNearney, Tony Romero, Gary Greenberg, Jennifer Sharron, Josh Weintraub, Ken Crosby and Seth Weidner, producers	ABC
2014 (66th)	Real Time with Bill Maher	Bill Maher, executive producer/host; Scott Carter, Sheila Griffiths, Brad Grey, Marc Gurvitz and Billy Martin, executive producers; Matt Wood, producer; Dean E. Johnsen, produced by	HBO
2014 (66th)	Saturday Night Live	Lorne Michaels, executive producer; Ken Aymong, supervising producer; Lindsay Shookus and Erin Doyle, producers; Steve Higgins and Erik Kenward, produced by	NBC
2014 (66th)	The Tonight Show Starring Jimmy Fallon	Lorne Michaels, executive producer; Jamie Granet Bederman, Rob Crabbe, Katie Hockmeyer, Jim Juvonen and Brian McDonald, supervising producers; Gavin Purcell, producer; Josh Lieb, produced by; Jimmy Fallon, host	NBC

=== 2020s ===
Year	Program	Producers	Network
2026 (78th)
2026 (78th)	The Late Show with Stephen Colbert	Stephen T. Colbert, executive producer/host; Tom Purcell and Jon Stewart, executive producers; Tanya Michnevich Bracco, Barry Julien, Matt Lappin and Opus Moreschi, co-executive producers; Aaron Cohen, Paul Dinello, Ariel Dumas, Emily Gertler, Jay Katsir, Bjoern Stejskal, Sara Vilkomerson and Adam Wager, supervising producers; Ballard C. Boyd, Michael Brumm, Megan Gearheart, Gabe Gronli, Paige Kendig, Brandon Marianacci and Jake Plunkett, producers; Louis J. Grieci, line producer	CBS
2026 (78th)	The Daily Show	Jon Stewart, executive producer/host; Jennifer Flanz and James "Baby Doll" Dixon, executive producers; Ramin Hedayati, Justin Melkmann, Zhubin Parang and Elise Terrell, co-executive producers; Dan Amira, Ian Berger, Max Browning, Sushil Dayal, Pamela DePace, David Kibuuka and David Paul Meyer, supervising producers; Jocelyn Conn, Jeff Gussow, Matt O'Brien, Brittany Radocha, Daniel Radosh, Shawna Shepherd, Beth Shorr and Fiona Wozniak, producers; Lisa Cortez, line producer; Ronny Chieng, Josh Johnson, Jordan Klepper, Michael Kosta and Desi Lydic, hosts	Comedy Central
2026 (78th)	Jimmy Kimmel Live!	Jimmy Kimmel, executive producer/host; Erin Irwin, Jennifer Sharron, David Craig and Molly McNearney, executive producers; Douglas DeLuca and Danny Ricker, co-executive producers; Gary Greenberg, Josh Halloway, Rory Albanese, Tony Romero, Seth Weidner and Josh Weintraub, supervising producers; Ken Crosby, Craig Powell, Nancy Fowkes, Patrick Friend, Sarah Robe, Max Schadler, Claire Daniels and Hara Shapiro, producers; Matt Musgrave, line producer	ABC
2026 (78th)	Last Week Tonight with John Oliver	John Oliver, executive producer/host; Tim Carvell and Liz Stanton, executive producers; Jeremy Tchaban, co-executive producer; Catherine Owens, supervising producer; Nicole Franza, line producer; Rebecca Etchberger, Kaye Foley, Laura L. Griffin, Anita Hassan, Farrah Lopez, Christopher McDaniel, Kate Mullaney, Matt Passet, Meghan Rhoad, Wynn Van Dusen, Marian Wang and Charles Wilson, producers	HBO
2026 (78th)	Saturday Night Live	Lorne Michaels, executive producer; Ken Aymong, supervising producer; Tom Broecker and Caroline Maroney, producers; Steve Higgins, Erik Kenward and Erin Doyle, produced by	NBC

== Programs with multiple awards ==
Totals include wins for Outstanding Talk Series and Outstanding Scripted Variety Series.

11 awards

- The Daily Show with Jon Stewart

7 awards

- Last Week Tonight with John Oliver

6 awards

- Late Show with David Letterman
- Saturday Night Live

3 awards

- The Andy Williams Show
- The Carol Burnett Show

2 awards

- The Colbert Report
- The David Frost Show
- The Dinah Shore Chevy Show
- Kennedy Center Honors
- Rowan & Martin's Laugh-In
- The Tonight Show Starring Johnny Carson
- Your Show of Shows

== Programs with multiple nominations ==
Totals include nominations for Outstanding Talk Series and Outstanding Scripted Variety Series.

28 nominations

- Saturday Night Live

21 nominations

- The Daily Show (Note: Sixteen nominations with Jon Stewart, five with Trevor Noah)

17 nominations

- Late Show with David Letterman

15 nominations

- The Tonight Show Starring Johnny Carson

12 nominations

- Jimmy Kimmel Live!
- Real Time with Bill Maher

11 nominations

- The Carol Burnett Show
- Late Night with David Letterman

10 nominations

- The Colbert Report
- The Tonight Show with Jay Leno

9 nominations

- Last Week Tonight with John Oliver

8 nominations

- Politically Incorrect

7 nominations

- Dennis Miller Live
- The Late Show with Stephen Colbert

6 nominations

- Drunk History

5 nominations

- AFI Life Achievement Award
- The Dean Martin Show
- The Dick Cavett Show
- The Garry Moore Show
- Late Night with Conan O'Brien
- MTV Unplugged
- The Muppet Show
- The Perry Como Show
- Your Show of Shows

4 nominations

- The Andy Williams Show
- The Ed Sullivan Show
- Full Frontal with Samantha Bee
- The Jackie Gleason Show
- Kennedy Center Honors
- The Late Late Show with James Corden
- Portlandia
- Rowan & Martin's Laugh-In
- The Smothers Brothers Comedy Hour
- Tony Awards
- The Tracey Ullman Show

3 nominations

- A Black Lady Sketch Show
- The Colgate Comedy Hour
- The David Frost Show
- The Dinah Shore Chevy Show
- Documentary Now!
- Evening at Pops
- The Flip Wilson Show
- In Living Color
- Late Night with Jimmy Fallon
- The Sonny & Cher Comedy Hour
- Toast of the Town
- The Tonight Show Starring Jimmy Fallon
- Tracey Takes On...

2 nominations

- The Arsenio Hall Show
- At Home with Amy Sedaris
- The Benny Hill Show
- The Chris Rock Show
- Conan
- The Danny Kaye Show
- The Dinah Shore Show
- Great Performances
- Here's Edie
- The Hollywood Palace
- I Love You, America with Sarah Silverman
- Inside Amy Schumer
- The Jack Benny Program
- Key & Peele
- Tonight Starring Jack Paar
- The Judy Garland Show
- Omnibus
- The Red Skelton Hour
- SCTV Network
- The Steve Allen Show
- Tracey Ullman's Show
