= Producers Guild of America Award for Best Live Entertainment & Talk Television =

The Producers Guild of America Award for Outstanding Producer of Live Entertainment & Talk Television is an annual award given by the Producers Guild of America since 2005. The award has gone through several category classifications since its inception. At its start, the award was called the Television Producer of the Year Award in Variety Television, before transitioning to Outstanding Producer of Live Entertainment & Competition Television in 2008, until its current title was introduced in 2012.

== Winners and nominations ==
=== 2000s ===
Outstanding Producer of Variety Television

Year	Program	Producers	Network
2004 (16th)
2004 (16th)	The Ellen DeGeneres Show	Ellen DeGeneres, Mary Connelly, Ed Glavin, Andy Lassner, Karen Kilgariff	Syndication
2004 (16th)	Chappelle's Show	Dave Chappelle, Neal Brennan, Michele Armour	Comedy Central
2004 (16th)	Late Show with David Letterman	Maria Pope, Barbara Gaines, Rob Burnett, Jude Brennan	CBS
2004 (16th)	Saturday Night Live	Lorne Michaels, Steve Higgins, Marci Klein, Michael Shoemaker, Ken Aymong	NBC
2004 (16th)	The 76th Annual Academy Awards	Joe Roth, Michael B. Seligman	ABC
2005 (17th)
2005 (17th)	The Ellen DeGeneres Show	Ellen DeGeneres, Mary Connelly, Ed Glavin, Andy Lassner, Karen Kilgariff	Syndication
2005 (17th)	Late Night with Conan O'Brien	Lorne Michaels, Jeff Ross, Tracy King, Frank Smiley, Daniel Ferguson	NBC
2005 (17th)	Late Show with David Letterman	Maria Pope, Barbara Gaines, Rob Burnett, Jude Brennan	CBS
2005 (17th)	Real Time with Bill Maher	Bill Maher, Scott Carter, Sheila Griffiths, Dean E. Johnsen	HBO
2005 (17th)	The 77th Annual Academy Awards	Gilbert Cates	ABC
2006 (18th)
2006 (18th)	Real Time with Bill Maher	Bill Maher, Scott Carter, Sheila Griffiths, Dean E. Johnsen	HBO
2006 (18th)	The Ellen DeGeneres Show	Ellen DeGeneres, Mary Connelly, Ed Glavin, Andy Lassner, Karen Kilgariff	Syndication
2006 (18th)	Late Night with Conan O'Brien	Lorne Michaels, Jeff Ross, Tracy King, Frank Smiley, Daniel Ferguson	NBC
2006 (18th)	Late Show with David Letterman	Maria Pope, Barbara Gaines, Rob Burnett, Jude Brennan	CBS
2006 (18th)	2006 Winter Olympics	Dick Ebersol, David Neal, Molly Solomon	NBC

Outstanding Producer of Live Entertainment & Competition Television

Year	Program	Producers	Network
2007 (19th)
2007 (19th)	The Colbert Report	Stephen Colbert, Jon Stewart, Allison Silverman, Rich Dahm, Meredith Bennett	Comedy Central
2007 (19th)	The Amazing Race	Jerry Bruckheimer, Bertram van Munster, Jonathan Littman, Amy Chacon, Hayma Washington, Evan Weinstein, Elise Doganieri, Mark A. Vertullo	CBS
2007 (19th)	American Idol	Nigel Lythgoe, Ken Warwick, Simon Fuller, Charles Boyd, Megan Michaels, Cécile Frot-Coutaz	Fox
2007 (19th)	Project Runway	Jane Cha Cutler, Desiree Gruber, Heidi Klum, Dan Cutforth, Jane Lipsitz	Bravo
2007 (19th)	Real Time with Bill Maher	Bill Maher, Scott Carter, Sheila Griffiths, Dean E. Johnsen	HBO
2008 (20th)
2008 (20th)	The Colbert Report	Stephen Colbert, Jon Stewart, Allison Silverman, Rich Dahm, Meredith Bennett, Tom Purcell	Comedy Central
2008 (20th)	The Amazing Race	Jerry Bruckheimer, Bertram van Munster, Jonathan Littman, Amy Chacon, Hayma Washington, Elise Doganieri, Mark A. Vertullo	CBS
2008 (20th)	Project Runway	Rich Bye, Rich Buhrman, Jane Cha Cutler, Desiree Gruber, Heidi Klum, Dan Cutforth, Jane Lipsitz	Bravo
2008 (20th)	Real Time with Bill Maher	Bill Maher, Scott Carter, Sheila Griffiths, Dean E. Johnsen	HBO
2008 (20th)	Top Chef	Rich Buhrman, Elizabeth Cook, Dan Cutforth, Jane Lipsitz, Shauna Minoprio, Nan Strait, Andrew Wallace	Bravo
2009 (21st)
2009 (21st)	The Colbert Report	Stephen Colbert, Jon Stewart, Allison Silverman, Rich Dahm, Meredith Bennett, Tom Purcell	Comedy Central
2009 (21st)	The Amazing Race	Jerry Bruckheimer, Bertram van Munster, Jonathan Littman, Amy Chacon, Hayma Washington, Elise Doganieri, Mark A. Vertullo	CBS
2009 (21st)	American Idol	Ken Warwick, Cécile Frot-Coutaz, Simon Fuller, Charles Boyd, Megan Michaels, Patrick Lynn	Fox
2009 (21st)	Project Runway	Rich Bye, Rich Buhrman, Jane Cha Cutler, Desiree Gruber, Heidi Klum, Dan Cutforth, Jane Lipsitz	Bravo
2009 (21st)	Top Chef	Rich Buhrman, Elizabeth Cook, Dan Cutforth, Jane Lipsitz, Shauna Minoprio, Nan Strait, Andrew Wallace	Bravo
