= Raphaela Neihausen =

American filmmaker and producer (born 1976)

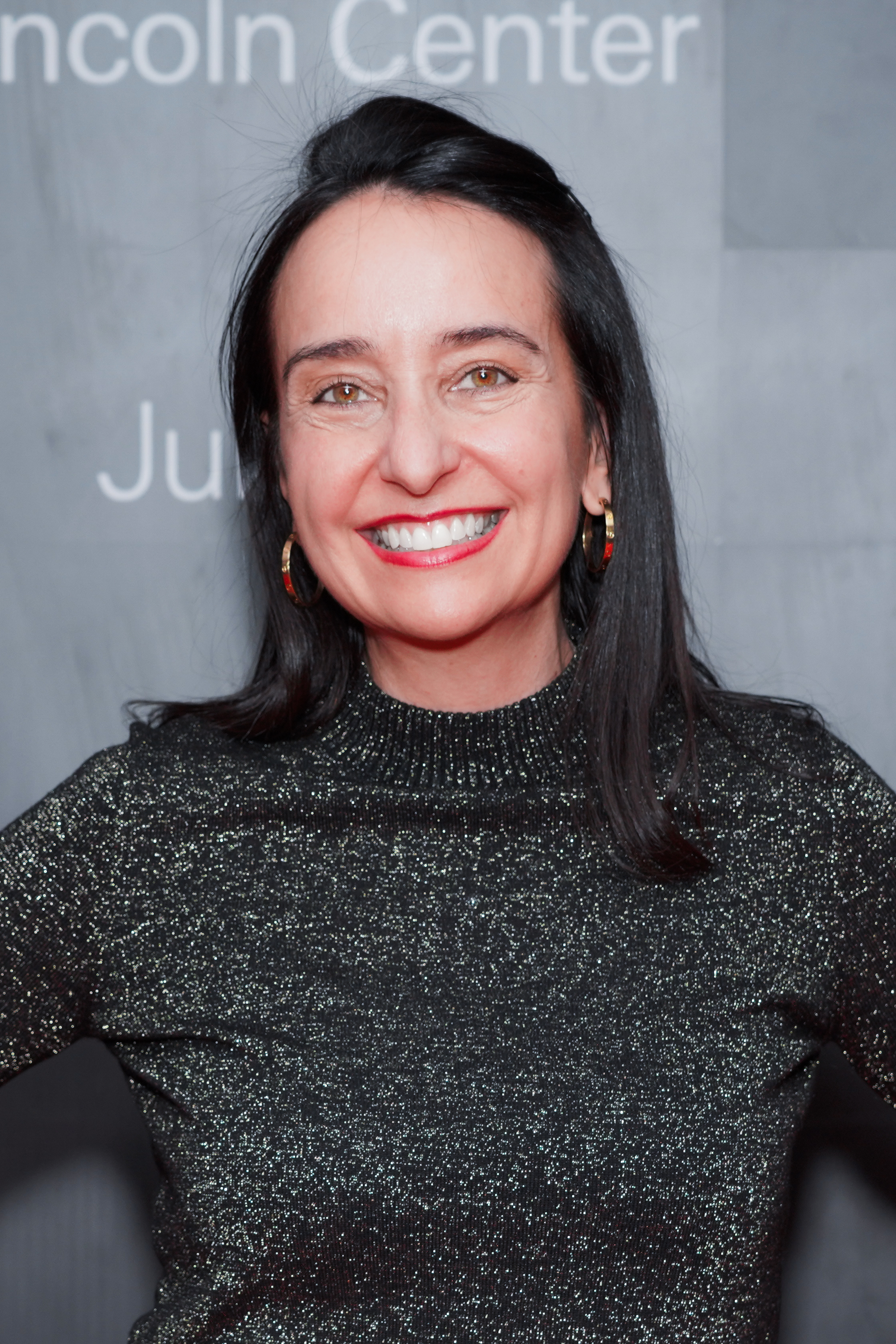
- Born: August 14, 1976 (age 49); Brooklyn, New York
- Status: Married
- Occupations: Film producer and director
- Known for: Executive director and co-founder of DOC NYC DOC NYC, America's largest documentary film festival
- Spouse: Thom Powers
- Children: son

Raphaela Neihausen (born August 14, 1976) is an American filmmaker and producer.

== Biography ==
Neihausen was born in 1976. Neihausen is Jewish. Together with husband Thom Powers, she founded DOC NYC, America's largest documentary festival. Her documentaries Miss Gulag (2007), Joe's Violin (2016) earned her critical acclaim including an Academy Award nomination for Best Documentary Short Subject at 89th Academy Awards, with director Kahane Cooperman.

She has been a resident of Montclair, New Jersey.

== Filmography ==
- Miss Gulag (2007)
- Joe's Violin (2016)

== Awards and nominations ==
- Nominated: Academy Award for Best Documentary (Short Subject) - Joe's Violin
