= Patriot Act with Hasan Minhaj =

Political comedy television series

- Genre: Political television; Talk show
- Created by: Hasan Minhaj; Prashanth Venkataramanujam
- Directed by: Richard A. Preuss
- Presented by: Hasan Minhaj
- Composer: Ludwig Göransson
- Country of origin: United States
- Original language: English
- No. of seasons: 6
- No. of episodes: 40

Production
- Executive producers: Hasan Minhaj; Jim Margolis; Prashanth Venkataramanujam; Michelle Caputo; Jennie Church-Cooper; Shannon Hartman
- Cinematography: Cameron Barnett
- Editors: Nathan Floody; Paul Frost
- Running time: 22–30 minutes
- Production companies: Art & Industry; Margolis Superstore; Five Screws Inc.; Minhaj Inc

Original release
- Network: Netflix
- Release: October 28, 2018 – June 28, 2020

Patriot Act with Hasan Minhaj is an American comedy talk show hosted by Hasan Minhaj that premiered on October 28, 2018, on Netflix and ran until June 28, 2020. It also had all the episodes, exclusives, and deep cuts on its YouTube channel. The series was created by Minhaj and Prashanth Venkataramanujam, both of whom also executive produce alongside Jim Margolis, Michelle Caputo, Shannon Hartman, Jennie Church-Cooper, and Steve Bodow. With 40 episodes across six seasons, the show has won an Emmy, a Peabody Award, and two Webby Awards. In August 2020, Netflix canceled the series after six seasons. Legal action threatened by female producers for a hostile work environment were settled out of court.

== Premise ==
Patriot Act with Hasan Minhaj aims to "explore the modern cultural and political landscape with depth and sincerity." In an attempt to separate his show from similar political satire shows, Minhaj said he wanted to create a show that is "timely and timeless."

== Production ==
On March 1, 2018, it was announced that Netflix had given a series order to a new weekly series created by Hasan Minhaj and Prashanth Venkataramanujam for a first season consisting of thirty-two episodes, split into several volumes. Executive producers were expected to include Minhaj, Venkataramanujam, Michelle Caputo, Shannon Hartman, and Jennie Church-Cooper. Production companies involved with the series were slated to consist of Art & Industry and Haven Entertainment. When writing episodes about the show Minhaj frequently excluded or limited the role that researchers played in developing content and could be dismissive of fact checkers. On June 7, 2018, it was reported that Jim Margolis had joined the series as showrunner and an executive producer. On August 9, 2018, it was revealed that the series had been titled Patriot Act with Hasan Minhaj and that it would premiere on October 28, 2018. Volume 3 taped and aired on Netflix in May and June 2019, and Volume 4 was released on August 4. Volume 5 of Patriot Act released on Netflix on November 10, 2019. Volume 6 was due to release on March 29, 2020 but was postponed due to the global COVID-19 pandemic. On August 18, 2020, Netflix canceled the series after six seasons.

== Marketing ==
On October 4, 2018, the first trailer for the series was released.

== Episodes ==
Season	Episodes	Originally released	
Season	Episodes	First released	Last released
Volume 1	7	October 28, 2018	December 2, 2018
Volume 2	6	February 10, 2019	March 17, 2019
Volume 3	6	May 12, 2019	June 16, 2019
Volume 4	6	August 4, 2019	September 8, 2019
Volume 5	7	November 10, 2019	December 22, 2019
Volume 6	8	May 17, 2020	June 28, 2020

=== Volume 1 (2018) ===
No. overall	No. in season	Title	Original release date
1	1	"Affirmative Action"	October 28, 2018
Minhaj examines Students for Fair Admissions v. President and Fellows of Harvard College, a lawsuit brought by Edward Blum that alleges the university discriminates against Asian Americans in their admission process.
2	2	"Saudi Arabia"	October 28, 2018
Minhaj discusses the United States' relationship with Saudi Arabia, following the death of journalist Jamal Khashoggi, and the crime's possible connection to Saudi crown prince Mohammad bin Salman.
3	3	"Amazon"	November 4, 2018
Minhaj looks at the role of Amazon in the United States economy, as well as the company's controversies and recent decisions.
4	4	"Oil"	November 11, 2018
A closer look at the United States' continued reliance on and expanding production of oil, and the Taylor oil spill.
5	5	"Supreme"	November 18, 2018
A discussion about hype culture, particularly streetwear brand Supreme and their 50% ownership by private equity firm The Carlyle Group.
6	6	"Immigration Enforcement"	November 25, 2018
A focus on recent immigration policies in the United States, ICE, and the Trump Administration's policy of separating migrant children from their parents.
7	7	"Content Moderation and Free Speech"	December 2, 2018
A look at the rules governing the content uploaded to social media platforms, and the role those companies have in moderating it; also, an update on the United States' relations with Saudi Arabia and crown prince Mohammad Bin Salman.

=== Volume 2 (2019) ===
No. overall	No. in season	Title	Original release date
8	1	"Censorship in China"	February 10, 2019
Hasan responds to his Saudi Arabia controversy, then dives in on the unlikely persistence of a feminist movement in China, despite the country's strict censorship laws under the rule of Xi Jinping.
9	2	"Drug Pricing"	February 17, 2019
As millions of Americans find it increasingly difficult to afford life-saving drugs like insulin, Hasan examines the many ways drug companies get away with price gouging.
10	3	"Student Loans"	February 24, 2019
Minhaj takes aim at student loan servicers, who prey on vulnerable Americans in their attempt to pay off debilitating student loan debt, an increasingly severe and uniquely American problem.
11	4	"Civil Rights Under Trump"	March 3, 2019
Civil Rights are being quietly dismantled by Trump's cabinet officials. Hasan explores how they are doing it and why it is so dangerous.
12	5	"Hip-hop and Streaming"	March 10, 2019
Minhaj dissects how the rise of music streaming on platforms like YouTube, Spotify, and SoundCloud has influenced the sound, reach, and impact of modern day hip hop, especially as a form of dissent against oppressive regimes.
13	6	"Indian Elections"	March 17, 2019
An overview of the 2019 Indian general election, discussing the Bharatiya Janata Party, Prime Minister Narendra Modi and the opposition including the Indian National Congress and Rahul Gandhi. Also features an interview with Shashi Tharoor.

=== Volume 3 (2019) ===
No. overall	No. in season	Title	Original release date
14	1	"Brazil, Corruption and the Rainforest"	May 12, 2019
Hasan takes on President Bolsonaro of Brazil, who is threatening the Amazon and its indigenous people like never before. Then, he analyzes the upcoming critical election in the Philippines. Also features an interview with Sônia Guajajara.
15	2	"The NRA's Global Impact"	May 19, 2019
The National Rifle Association is going global. Hasan takes an insightful look at the ways the organization has been hypocritically spreading its dangerous message and business practices around the world.
16	3	"Cricket Corruption"	May 26, 2019
Although cricket could be a global force for good, Indian cricket's governing body is holding it back. This episode features an interview with former chairman of the IPL, Lalit Modi.
17	4	"Indian Elections Update and 1MDB Scandal"	June 2, 2019
Hasan follows up on India's election results, then gets into the risks of sovereign wealth funds without oversight, as demonstrated by the recent 1MDB scandal.
18	5	"Protests in Sudan"	June 9, 2019
Sudan is at a major crossroads in their political history: will they embrace democracy or be doomed to a brutal military dictatorship? This episode features an interview with Sudanese protestor Marine Alneel.
19	6	"Why Your Internet Sucks"	June 16, 2019
Hasan examines how the government and cable providers fail to provide adequate Internet for millions of rural and low income Americans.

=== Volume 4 (2019) ===
No. overall	No. in season	Title	Original release date
20	1	"The Dark Side of the Video Game Industry"	August 4, 2019
Hasan addresses allegations of worker abuse and toxic culture at many video game developers.
21	2	"Fentanyl"	August 11, 2019
Hasan discusses the opioid crisis, drug addiction and both legal and illegal manufacturing of fentanyl, including the companies that have been instrumental in promoting it.
22	3	"Why Your Public Transportation Sucks"	August 18, 2019
Hasan examines how the U.S. government and the Koch brothers are sabotaging plans to revive and expand public transportation as infrastructure crumbles.
23	4	"The Real Cost of Cruises"	August 25, 2019
Hasan talks about the dangers of traveling on cruise ships and the apparent negligence of cruise companies to rectify said dangers.
24	5	"The Two Sides of Canada"	September 1, 2019
In advance of Canada's election, Hasan talks with Justin Trudeau and scrutinizes the prime minister's reputation as a champion of progressive policies.
25	6	"The Broken Policing System"	September 8, 2019
Hasan takes on United States' police misconduct including the deaths of Eric Garner, Michael Brown and Laquan McDonald in 2014. Then, he discusses the seminars conducted by Dave Grossman and the privilege cops get due to the Officers' Bill of Rights.

=== Volume 5 (2019) ===
No. overall	No. in season	Title	Original release date
26	1	"Mental Health"	November 10, 2019
Mental health is finally having a moment in the national conversation, but insurance companies, like Blue Cross and UnitedHealth, are finding ways to deny mental health treatment to thousands of patients. Hasan talks about his own experience with mental health therapy, the Mental Health Parity Act, and shines a spotlight on the fight to bridge the disparity in treatment between mental and physical health.
27	2	"Trump's Worst Policy: Killing Asylum"	November 17, 2019
As record numbers of migrants flee perilous conditions in Central America’s Northern Triangle, Hasan looks at all the unscrupulous ways the Trump Administration is trying to block them from seeking asylum in the United States.
28	3	"The Ugly Truth of Fast Fashion"	November 24, 2019
Fast fashion brands like H&M and Zara are churning out cheap, new clothes every few days, fueling us to shop more than ever before. Hasan explores how our desire to look “fresh to death” is actually killing the planet.
29	4	"Why Billionaires Won't Save Us"	December 1, 2019
The wealthiest Americans are often celebrated for their prolific giving, but is it altruism or is it all just hype? Hasan dissects how the ultra-rich use philanthropy to get richer, distract from the injustices on which they built their fortunes, and dictate politics and policy.
30	5	"Don’t Ignore the Asian Vote in 2020"	December 8, 2019
The Asian American population has grown large enough to swing elections, but it remains one of the least politically active groups in the country. Hasan travels to Asian American communities to hear the issues that matter to voters and to sit down with two politicians running to represent them––presidential candidates Andrew Yang and Cory Booker. Hasan also reaches out to more conservative voices in the Asian American community, but gets barred from an event featuring Indian Prime Minister Narendra Modi and U.S. President Donald Trump.
31	6	"Why We Can't Retire"	December 15, 2019
With the help of Senator Bernie Sanders, Hasan breaks down the financial burden of younger generations caring for their aging parents - and themselves.
32	7	"How America Is Causing Global Obesity"	December 22, 2019
Obesity used to be a problem in the United States, but has now expanded globally. Hasan examines how it became worldwide as the United States exported its unhealthy diet to smaller countries with the help of free trade; particularly, how Samoa, China, and Mexico have been ruined by obesity caused by U.S. companies (especially Coca-Cola.)

=== Volume 6 (2020) ===
No. overall	No. in season	Title	Original release date
33	1	"What Happens If You Can't Pay Rent?"	May 17, 2020
During the COVID-19 pandemic, millions of Americans struggle to pay rent and face a mass eviction crisis.
34	2	"The Legal Marijuana Industry Is Rigged"	May 24, 2020
Hasan delves into the fight for the legalization of marijuana in the United States and investigates the now-booming legal marijuana industry and how people of color are disenfranchised by it to both use and sell it in America.
35	3	"How Coronavirus Broke America"	May 31, 2020
With healthcare and food workers at risk, Hasan examines Trump's actions which have continued to exacerbate the economic crisis.
36	4	"We Cannot Stay Silent About George Floyd"	June 6, 2020
Hasan makes a passionate plea to the world but especially to his own community, the Asian American community, about taking action to support the Black community after the murder of George Floyd and the recent events of police brutality.
37	5	"Why the News Industry Is Dying"	June 7, 2020
Local newspapers are the source of some of the nation's biggest news breaks. However, these institutions are in danger of disappearing due to private equity firms.
38	6	"Is College Still Worth It?"	June 14, 2020
As colleges increase in price and offer less, Hasan considers whether a college degree is worth its value.
39	7	"We're Doing Elections Wrong"	June 21, 2020
America's winner-take-all elections drive a divisive, two-party machine that limits choice. Hasan explains - and champions a viable alternative.
40	8	"Why Doing Taxes Is So Hard"	June 28, 2020
Hasan exposes how TurboTax pushes taxpayers away from its free service to a paid option, and why efforts to simplify filing have repeatedly failed.

== Reception ==
=== Critical response ===
The series has been met with widespread critical acclaim from critics upon its premiere. On the review aggregation website Rotten Tomatoes, the first season of the series holds a 100% approval rating with an average rating of 7.79 out of 10 based on 15 reviews. The website's critical consensus reads, "Patriot Act stands apart from other like-minded comedy shows thanks to Hasan Minhaj's masterful blending of thought and feeling, catharsis and criticism." Metacritic, which uses a weighted average, assigned the series a score of 78 out of 100 based on 4 critics, indicating "generally favorable reviews".

=== Influence and controversies ===
In October 2018, a segment of the episode "Saudi Arabia" included reference to offensive language – the term "Negro Blood" – used in an online manual for US troops deployed to Saudi Arabia to describe the indigenous Gulf Arabs of that country. Following the episode's release, U.S. Central Command issued an apology and removed the online manual.

On January 1, 2019, it was reported that the episode "Saudi Arabia" had been removed from Netflix's service in Saudi Arabia after the country's Communications and Information Technology Commission issued a request to the company to take it down over concerns regarding its content, which included criticism of Crown Prince Mohammad bin Salman and the Saudi-led military campaign in Yemen. However, the episode was still available in the country at the time of the report through the show's official YouTube channel.

The March 2019 episode, "Indian Elections", focused on the 2019 Indian general election, featuring criticism of Prime Minister Narendra Modi and the Bharatiya Janata Party (BJP) government. It included an interview with Congress MP Shashi Tharoor and discussed topics such as Hindu nationalism, the Kashmir conflict, and the issue of mob lynchings reported to target Muslim and Dalit minorities. The episode generated controversy in India, drawing strong reactions from both supporters and critics of the Modi government.

The May 2019 episode "Brazil, Corruption and the Rainforest" covered the 2019 Philippine general election, criticized President Rodrigo Duterte, and tackled issues such as the Philippine drug war. The episode drew controversy in the Philippines among supporters and opponents of Duterte, leading to a response from the Malacañang Palace attacking the show.

The show's influence was recognized by Time, which included Hasan Minhaj on its list of the 100 most influential people in the world in April 2019. The Daily Show host Trevor Noah described Patriot Act as a "groundbreaking Netflix show."

After the show's cancellation, several producers including Nur Nasreen Ibrahim, Sheila V. Kumar, and Amy Zhang claimed to have experienced abuse, mistreatment, and harassment while in the workplace. The matter was settled out of court.

=== Awards and nominations ===
Year	Association	Award	Recipient	Result	Ref(s)
2019	Peabody Awards	Entertainment Award	Patriot Act with Hasan Minhaj	Won	
2019	Time	100 Most Influential People	Hasan Minhaj	Won	
2019	Webby Awards	Video Entertainment	"Deep Cuts"	Won	
2019	Webby Awards	Special Achievement	Hasan Minhaj	Won	
2019	Webby Awards	Social Campaign for Television & Film	Patriot Act with Hasan Minhaj	Nominated	
2019	Emmy Awards	Outstanding Motion Design	Patriot Act with Hasan Minhaj	Won	
