= Sheila Rogers =

American record producer

Sheila Rogers is an American columnist and television producer, known for her work in the field of music. She wrote for Rolling Stone magazine, and has been a producer for The Late Show with David Letterman, for which she shares 7 Emmy nominations, and The Late Late Show with James Corden.

== Writing ==
Rogers was a writer for Rolling Stone magazine.

She began her career as a writer for Rolling Stone as its Random Notes columnist in 1986. She later branched out into special feature articles including interviews with the Rolling Stones, the Eagles, Billy Idol, and Bonnie Raitt. Rogers occasionally reviewed concerts and the Grammys for Rolling Stone.

== Television ==
She, with the other producers of The Late Show with David Letterman, were nominated for the Primetime Emmy Award for Outstanding Variety Series seven years in a row, between 2003 and 2009.

Rogers became a talent scout for Late Night with David Letterman in 1991, and her first day was depicted in a remote that aired in the show. Rogers continued through The Late Show with David Letterman, where she also became supervising producer. She also became executive producer for the Live on Letterman concert series, and co-produced the first and only Live on Letterman music CD featuring various popular artists' live performance material including that of Aretha Franklin, Elvis Costello, Jerry Garcia and Sheryl Crow.

After the announcement of David Letterman's retirement in 2014, CBS announced that Sheila Rogers would be the new supervising producer for The Late Late Show with James Corden debuting in 2015.

== Personal life ==
Sheila is the daughter of Rita Rogers, a psychiatrist whose office was at Malaga Cove Plaza in Palos Verdes Estates, CA for many years. Sheila’s father was Gail Allen Rogers, a brain surgeon. Sheila was a violinist in the Palos Verdes High School Orchestra (1974-1978)

Rogers and Saturday Night Live music producer Hal Willner were married and had a son (Arlo Willner) in November 2004.
