= Joe's Violin =

2016 documentary film directed by Kahane Cooperman

- Directed by: Kahane Cooperman
- Produced by: Kahane Cooperman; Raphaela Neihausen
- Cinematography: Bob Richman
- Edited by: Amira Dughri; Andrew Saunderson
- Music by: Gary Meister
- Production company: Lucky Two Productions
- Distributed by: The New Yorker
- Release date: April 14, 2016 (Tribeca)
- Running time: 24 Minutes
- Country: United States
- Language: English

Joe's Violin is a 2016 American short documentary film directed by Kahane Cooperman, and produced by Kahane Cooperman and Raphaela Neihausen, that follows a moment in the life of a Polish survivor of the Holocaust from the time he decides to drop off his 70-year-old violin during a local instrument drive through the violin's acquisition by a new owner, a 12-year-old girl from the Bronx, and recounts how the experience changes both their lives.

== Cast ==
- Joe Feingold – as himself. Holocaust survivor.
- Regina Feingold
- Brianna Perez – as herself. School girl.
- Kathleen Drohan

== Reception ==
The film premiered at the Tribeca Film Festival on 14 April 2016.

== Awards ==
- 2017: Academy Awards – Best Documentary Short Subject – Nominated
