= The Croods: Family Tree =

American animated TV series

- Genre: Comedy; Adventure
- Based on: Characters created by: John Cleese; Kirk DeMicco; Chris Sanders; Paul Fisher; Bob Logan; Dan and Kevin Hageman
- Developed by: Mark Banker
- Voices of: Kiff VandenHeuvel; Ally Dixon; Darin Brooks; A.J. LoCascio; Amy Landecker; Artemis Pebdani; Matthew Waterson; Amy Rosoff; Kelly Marie Tran; Abby Trott
- Theme music composer: Brett Creswell; Michael Tan
- Composer: Hannah Parrott
- Country of origin: United States
- No. of seasons: 8
- No. of episodes: 52

Production
- Executive producers: Mark Banker; Todd Grimes
- Running time: 22 minutes
- Production company: DreamWorks Animation Television

Original release
- Network: Hulu; Peacock
- Release: September 23, 2021 – November 9, 2023

Related
- The Croods: A New Age; Dawn of the Croods

The Croods: Family Tree is an American animated television series that is produced by DreamWorks Animation under DreamWorks Animation Television. The series is based on the 2013 animated film The Croods, taking place after the events of The Croods: A New Age (2020). The series was released on September 23, 2021, while the eighth and final season premiered on November 9, 2023.

== Premise ==
After the events of the sequel, the Croods and Bettermans must learn to get along in the Betterman treehouse.

== Cast ==
- Ally Dixon as Eep Crood
- Kelly Marie Tran (seasons 1–4) and Abby Trott (seasons 5–8) as Dawn Betterman
- Kiff VandenHeuvel as Grug Crood and Lighting Bolt (season 4)
- Darin Brooks as Guy
- A.J. LoCascio as Thunk Crood
- Amy Landecker as Ugga Crood
- Artemis Pebdani as Gran Crood
- Dee Bradley Baker as Sandy, Chunky, Douglas, Belt, and Sash
- Matthew Waterson as Phil Betterman
- Amy Rosoff as Hope Betterman
- Tru Valentino as Hwam (season 5 and 8)

== Episodes ==
=== Series overview ===
Season	Episodes	Originally released
1	6	September 23, 2021
2	7	April 5, 2022
3	6	June 2, 2022
4	7	August 31, 2022
5	6	November 25, 2022
6	7	March 30, 2023
7	6	July 27, 2023
8	7	November 9, 2023

=== Season 1 (2021) ===
No. overall	No. in season	Title	Directed by	Written by	Storyboarded by	Original release date
1	1	"Sticky Business"	Stephanie Arnett	Mark Banker	Jiedi Chen; Ryan Hansen and Max Lawson	September 23, 2021
Struggling to find their purpose on the Betterman farm, the Croods see an opportunity to prove their worth by harvesting Phil's perilously sticky bounceberries.
2	2	"Guy Time"	Stephanie Arnett	Stephanie Streisand	Jiedi Chen and Zheng Kang	September 23, 2021
When Eep wants alone time with her new friend, Dawn, Guy seeks a friend of his own and finds an unlikely companion in Thunk.
3	3	"Game Nightmare"	Steve Trenbirth	Rich Dahm	Tang Lee; Ben McLaughlin and Katie Yates	September 23, 2021
When the Bettermans invite the Croods to join their family game night, two things become clear: Phil needs to win and Grug hates to lose.
4	4	"What Goes Eep Must Come Dawn"	Kevin Peaty	Lucas Mills	Marc Camelbeke and Gener Ocampo	September 23, 2021
After a crowverine gliding mishap, Dawn loses her confidence and tells Eep she's taking a break from adventures. Eep convinces Dawn to join her on one last adventure - climbing Grrr Mountain.
5	5	"Parental Stridence"	Scooter Tidwell	Matt Smith	Jiedi Chen; Max Lawson and Andrew Marshel	September 23, 2021
When Hope oversteps by trying to teach Sandy manners, Ugga gets her revenge by challenging Hope to do the impossible: civilize Thunk.
6	6	"The Flopping of the Bullruses"	Steve Trenbirth	Amanda Brooke Perrin	Tang Lee; Ben McLaughlin and Katie Yates	September 23, 2021
Ugga has a secret - she's taking Eep to "flop with the bulrusses" - a fun and dangerous pastime Ugga enjoyed as a teen. Ugga's excitement fades when Hope invites herself and Dawn along.

=== Season 2 (2022) ===
No. overall	No. in season	Title	Directed by	Written by	Storyboarded by	Original release date
7	1	"Remote Control"	Kevin Peaty	Mark Banker	Marc Camelbeke; Tim Cant; Gener Ocampo and Marc Wasik	April 5, 2022
Bored of the viewing options on window, Thunk realises what he's been missing -- real life drama. But when Thunk starts creating drama around the farm, the others set out to teach him a lesson.
8	2	"Daddy Daughter Day"	Scooter Tidwell	Rich Dahm	Jiedi Chen and Nico Selma	April 5, 2022
Sandy is finally old enough to join Grug and Eep for the annual Daddy Daughter Day and Grug couldn't be more excited.
9	3	"There's No Phil in Team"	Steve Trenbirth	Lucas Mills	Ben McLaughlin; Tang Lee and Katie Yates	April 5, 2022
When Phil humiliates himself playing throw-go-nut with the punch monkeys, the Croods band together to help him regain his confidence.
10	4	"Thunder Games"	Kevin Peaty	Amanda Brooke Perrin	Marc Camelbeke; Gener Ocampo and Simon O'Leary	April 5, 2022
When Gran announces it's time to choose a new Thunder Sisters Queen, Ugga assumes she's got it in the bag.
11	5	"Shock and Awww"	Scooter Tidwell	Rich Dahm	Jiedi Chen and Nico Selma	April 5, 2022
Guy is always surprising Eep with romantic gestures and Eep wants to return the favour. But when Guy proves impossible to surprise, Eep has to step up her game.
12	6	"Straycation"	Steve Trenbirth	Matt Smith	Ben McLaughlin; Tang Lee; Marc Wasik and Katie Yates	April 5, 2022
13	7	"Straycation"	Kevin Peaty	Lucas Mills	Marc Camelbeke, Gener Ocampo and Simon O'Leary	April 5, 2022
Part 1: The Crood and Betterman parents have been struggling to get along -- they're so different. The two couples realise they need some time apart and decide to get away from the farm and each other. Part 2: While the parents are away, the kids are in charge of the tree house, but when the punch monkeys invade the house, the kids find themselves out of their element.

=== Season 3 (2022) ===
No. overall	No. in season	Title	Directed by	Written by	Storyboarded by	Original release date
14	1	"The Thunder Misters"	Scooter Tidwell	Amanda Brooke Perrin	Jiedi Chen and Nico Selma	June 2, 2022
Grug, Phil, and Guy form a new tribe against the Thunder Sisters by their teamwork.
15	2	"Eep Walking"	Steve Trenbirth	Mark Banker	Ben McLaughlin; Tang Lee; Ian Harrowell and Katie Yates	June 2, 2022
When Eep discovers that she has been sleepwalking, she goes to find out how to stop it for once and for all.
16	3	"The Gorgwatch Project"	Kevin Peaty	Rich Dahm	Marc Camelbeke; Gener Ocampo and Simon O'Leary	June 2, 2022
Guy and Thunk tell a scary story of Gorgwatch who doesn't really exist, but the story keeps both Eep and Dawn up all night.
17	4	"Skate or Dawn"	Scooter Tidwell	Lucas Mills	Jiedi Chen and Nico Selma	June 2, 2022
When Guy invents a skateboard, Eep and Dawn start to have fun by doing some tricks until the Punch-Monkeys try to mess with them.
18	5	"Phil's Fun Farm"	Steve Trenbirth	Mark Banker	Ben McLaughlin; Tang Lee and Katie Yates	June 2, 2022
Phil turns his farm into a theme park to learn what fun is.
19	6	"Joy Story"	Kevin Peaty	Matt Smith	Marc Camelbeke; Gener Ocampo and Simon O'Leary	June 2, 2022
Eep and Dawn find an egg and take it in as their new pet, but when they find out that the egg is a dangerous creature, they travel together to bring the egg back to its family.

=== Season 4 (2022) ===
No. overall	No. in season	Title	Directed by	Written by	Storyboarded by	Original release date
20	1	"The Big Shine"	Scooter Tidwell	Rich Dahm	Jiedi Chen and Nico Selma	August 31, 2022
When Grug overhears Thunk accidentally call Phil "Dad", he tries to reconnect with Thunk by taking him to the natural spectacle known as "Big Shine."
21	2	"Ball in Cup"	Steve Trenbirth	Lucas Mills	Ben McLaughlin; Tang Lee and Katie Yates	August 31, 2022
When Phil invents a simple new game called ball-in-cup, everyone except Hope, can't stop playing it. But just when Hope thinks she's rid the farm of the game, she finds herself addicted to the game worst of all.
22	3	"Growing Paints"	Kevin Peaty	Amanda Brooke Perrin	Marc Camelbeke; Gener Ocampo and Simon O'Leary	August 31, 2022
When Grug thinks his forehead looks too big in Ugga's family portrait, he strives to make the painting disappear.
23	4	"Cave New World"	Scooter Tidwell	Rich Dahm	Jiedi Chen and Nico Selma	August 31, 2022
When the adults exclude the kids from their adult-only cave, the kids make their own much cooler cave, soon making the adults want to switch caves.
24	5	"Thunk Tank"	Steve Trenbirth	Lucas Mills	Ben McLaughlin; Tang Lee; Katie Yates and Regine Clarke	August 31, 2022
When a freak lightning strike turns Thunk into a genius, Phil is thrilled to have someone likeminded on the farm, until the farm residents start asking Thunk for help with problems on the farm instead of him.
25	6	"Home Punch Home"	Kevin Peaty	Matt Smith	Marc Camelbeke; Gener Ocampo and Simon O'Leary	August 31, 2022
Tired of the farm's feud with the neighbouring punch monkeys, Ugga arranges a punch summit where the Bettermans and Croods will stay in the punch monkey village to learn how to all get along.
26	7	"Goodbye Crood World"	Scooter Tidwell	Mark Banker	Andy Casadonte; Jiedi Chen and Heidi Neunhoffer	August 31, 2022
When Phil detects a meteor is hurtling towards the farm, the Bettermans and Croods must decide how to spend their last day on earth.

=== Season 5 (2022) ===
No. overall	No. in season	Title	Directed by	Written by	Storyboarded by	Original release date
27	1	"Hwam I Am"	Steve Trenbirth	Amanda Brooke Perrin	Ben McLaughlin; Tang Lee and Katie Yates	November 25, 2022
The Croods find a man frozen in ice and thaw him, only to discover he was an old flame of Gran's.
28	2	"Eep Cover"	Kevin Peaty	Lucas Mills	Marc Camelbeke; Gener Ocampo and Simon O'Leary	November 25, 2022
Determined for Grug and Guy to bond, Eep plans a hunt for the three of them that becomes dangerous.
29	3	"I.O. Crood"	Scooter Tidwell	Rich Dahm	Andy Casadonte; Jiedi Chen and Heidi Neunhoffer	November 25, 2022
When Grug saves Hope's life during a dangerous mountainside tartichoke harvest, rather than feeling grateful, Hope is desperate to save Grug's life in order to not be indebted to him.
30	4	"Appetite for Deception"	Steve Trenbirth	Matt Smith	Ben McLaughlin; Tang Lee and Katie Yates	November 25, 2022
Determined to show Hope that she's just as good a cook, Ugga decides to cook a meal that will wow the farm residents. But when Ugga realizes she's out of her element, she turns to an unlikely place for help: the punch monkeys.
31	5	"Shellraiser"	Kevin Peaty	Amanda Brooke Perrin	Marc Camelbeke; Gener Ocampo and Simon O'Leary	November 25, 2022
When Hope allows Dawn to borrow her favorite bracelet, Dawn is determined to prove she is responsible.
32	6	"Camp Thunder"	Scooter Tidwell	Mark Banker	Andy Casadonte; Jiedi Chen and Heidi Neunhoffer	November 25, 2022
Gran announces it's time for a Thunder Sister retreat to strengthen their team building skills, but Gran takes it too far when she puts the sisters through a dangerous trial.

=== Season 6 (2023) ===
No. overall	No. in season	Title	Directed by	Written by	Storyboarded by	Original release date
33	1	"Phil Pickle"	Steve Trenbirrh	Lucas Mills	Ben McLaughlin; Tang Lee and Katie Yates	March 30, 2023
When Phil's beloved stick companion Philliam goes missing, he enlists the help of Ugga and Eep who lead an investigation across the farm.
34	2	"Best Friend in Show"	Kevin Peaty	Rich Dahm	Marc Camelbeke; Gener Ocampo; Simon O'Leary and Marc Sonntag	March 30, 2023
Each kid believes that they have the best pet on the farm, and hold a contest to prove it. Meanwhile, Phil's attempts to find a pet to enter proves dangerous, as he turns to wild animals.
35	3	"Game of Crows"	Scooter Tidwell	Matt Smith	Andy Casadonte; Jiedi Chen and Heidi Neunhoffer	March 30, 2023
The Croods and Bettermans take in Malachi, Gran's longtime enemy, until his broken wing heals. Eep is unsure whether or not Malachi can be trusted.
36	4	"Pie Hard"	Steve Trenbirrh	Mark Banker	Ben McLaughlin; Tang Lee and Katie Yates	March 30, 2023
After a back-breaking day of farm chores, all Grug and Phil want is a slice of pie. But when there is only one slice left, both Grug and Phil argue that they deserve it more. To prove who works harder.
37	5	"Snack of Dawn"	Kevin Peaty	Amanda Brooke Perrin	Marc Camelbeke; Gener Ocampo; Simon O'Leary and Marc Sonntag	March 30, 2023
Dawn is bummed when an injury prevents her from joining the Croods and Bettermans to a trip to Fizzy Falls, but Thunk recruits her on his quest for an ancient stash of legendary snacks.
38	6	"Fam Farm Fun Fest"	Scooter Tidwell	Luca Mills	Andy Casadonte; Jiedi Chen and Heidi Neunhoffer	March 30, 2023
The kids set off to bring Chunky back home when he leaves to follow the distant call of another death cat.
39	7	"It's an Under-ful Life"	Steve Trenbirrh	Rich Dahm	Ben McLaughlin; Tang Lee and Katie Yates	March 30, 2023
Grug accidentally reveals a cave beneath the treehouse. When Phil can't convince Hope, Grug, and Ugga that the treehouse is more impressive than the new cave, he sets out to destroy the cave.

=== Season 7 (2023) ===
No. overall	No. in season	Title	Directed by	Written by	Storyboarded by	Original release date
40	1	"Alphabout"	Scooter Tidwell	Mark Banker	Andy Casadonte; Jiedi Chen and Heidi Neunhoffer	July 27, 2023
Trained by her parents, Eep competes in Alphafight. But when Eep learns that a human winning could upset the balance of nature, she must choose between winning to make her parents proud, and losing to protect the other animals.
41	2	"Bad Luck Moon Rising"	Kevin Peaty	Matt Smith	Marc Camelbeke; Gener Ocampo; Simon O'Leary and Marc Sonntag	July 27, 2023
Phil and Guy try to disprove the Croods' belief that leaving offerings to the fire moon will prevent bad luck, but their efforts seem to cause a series of mishaps.
42	3	"Beardfoot"	Steve Trenbirth	Jesse Lucks	Ben McLaughlin; Tang Lee; Katie Yates and Marc Sonntag	July 27, 2023
Upset that he can't grow a beard, Grug resorts to unorthodox hair growth methods that go awry.
43	4	"Stuck ToGuyther"	Kevin Peaty	Rich Dahm	Marc Camelbeke; Gener Ocampo and Simon O'Leary	July 27, 2023
Guy and Hope get glued together while attempting to fix a broken vase.
44	5	"Hidelander"	Scooter Tidwell	Lucas Mills	Andy Casadonte; Jiedi Chen and Heidi Neunhoffer	July 27, 2023
Terrible at hide-and-seek, Thunk asks Gran to teach him to hide. With her training, he soon becomes her partner in crime, helping her with heists and schemes.
45	6	"What Liars Beneath"	Steve Trenbirth	Amanda Brooke Perrin	Tang Lee; Ben McLaughlin; Marc Sonntag and Katie Yates	July 27, 2023
Dawn hates her mother's beetballs and has been secretly dumping them in the lagoon to spare her feelings.

=== Season 8 (2023) ===
No. overall	No. in season	Title	Directed by	Written by	Storyboarded by	Original release date
46	1	"Dared Straight"	Kevin Peaty	Matt Smith	Marc Camelbeke; Gener Ocampo and Simon O'Leary	November 9, 2023
The kids take their "Dare Game" too far, causing Grug, Ugga, Phil and Hope to forbid them from playing it; when the adults also get hooked on the game, the kids must convince them to stop before someone gets hurt.
47	2	"Thunkless"	Scooter Tidwell	Rich Dahm	Andy Casadonte; Jiedi Chen and Heidi Neunhoffer	November 9, 2023
Thunk goes missing after the Thunder Sisters dismiss his help during a battle; the Thunder Sisters along with Grug, Phil and Guy's newly formed "Thunder Sifters" search on and off the farm for Thunk.
48	3	"Friday Nut Lights"	Steve Trenbirth	Mark Banker	Tang Lee; Ben McLaughlin; Katie Yates and Marc Sonntag	November 9, 2023
The Croods, the Bettermans, and Guy compete in the Throw-Go-Bowl, an annual Throw-Go-Nut championship game against the punch monkeys, but Grug's desire to win above all else threatens to push away his teammates.
49	4	"The Cantaplum Run"	Adam Smith	Lucas Mills	Marc Camelbeke; Gener Ocampo and Simon O'Leary	November 9, 2023
Phil enlists the Croods to help him retrieve a rare fruit before some wild animals do, but the Croods and the Bettermans compete with each other when Grug does not trust Phil's methods of getting it back to the farm.
50	5	"Flush to Judgement"	Scooter Tidwell	Amanda Brooke Perrin	Andy Casadonte; Jiedi Chen and Heidi Neunhoffer	November 9, 2023
When the parents find their precious outhouse destroyed, they hold a "trouble trial" to find the culprit; to prove their innocence, each kid provides their own explanation for the outhouse's destruction.
51	6	"Caveheart"	Steve Trenbirth	Matt Smith	Tang Lee; Ben McLaughlin; Katie Yates and May Hingston	November 9, 2023
52	7	"Caveheart"	Adam Smith	Mark Banker	Marc Camelbeke; Ben Grimshaw; Gener Ocampo and Simon O'Leary	November 9, 2023
Part 1: After a big argument between the Croods and the Bettermans, the parents decide to separate the two families; not wanting to split up, the kids try to convince the parents to make up before the Croods move off the farm entirely. Part 2: Hwam shares news of a utopian community, accidentally reigniting the argument between the Croods and the Bettermans; as the Croods journey to Caveana and the Bettermans adjust to life without them, the parents deny how much they miss each other.

== Production ==
On August 31, 2021, DreamWorks announced a CGI animated series titled The Croods: Family Tree, based on The Croods: A New Age, and would stream September 23 on Hulu and Peacock. Tran reprises her role as Dawn, while A.J. LoCascio reprises his role as Thunk from Dawn of the Croods. The new voice cast features Amy Landecker as Ugga, Kiff VandenHeuvel as Grug, Ally Dixon as Eep, Artemis Pebdani as Gran, Darin Brooks as Guy, Matthew Waterson as Phil, and Amy Rosoff as Hope. Mark Banker (from The Epic Tales of Captain Underpants, Adventure Time, Go, Dog, Go!) and Todd Grimes (from The Epic Tales of Captain Underpants) serve as executive producers and showrunners for the series. Like all DreamWorks Animation Television programs, the series is animated by Mikros Animation under Technicolor Animation Productions. From seasons 5 to 8, Tran was replaced by Abby Trott as Dawn.
