= Rich Dahm =

American comedy writer from Wisconsin

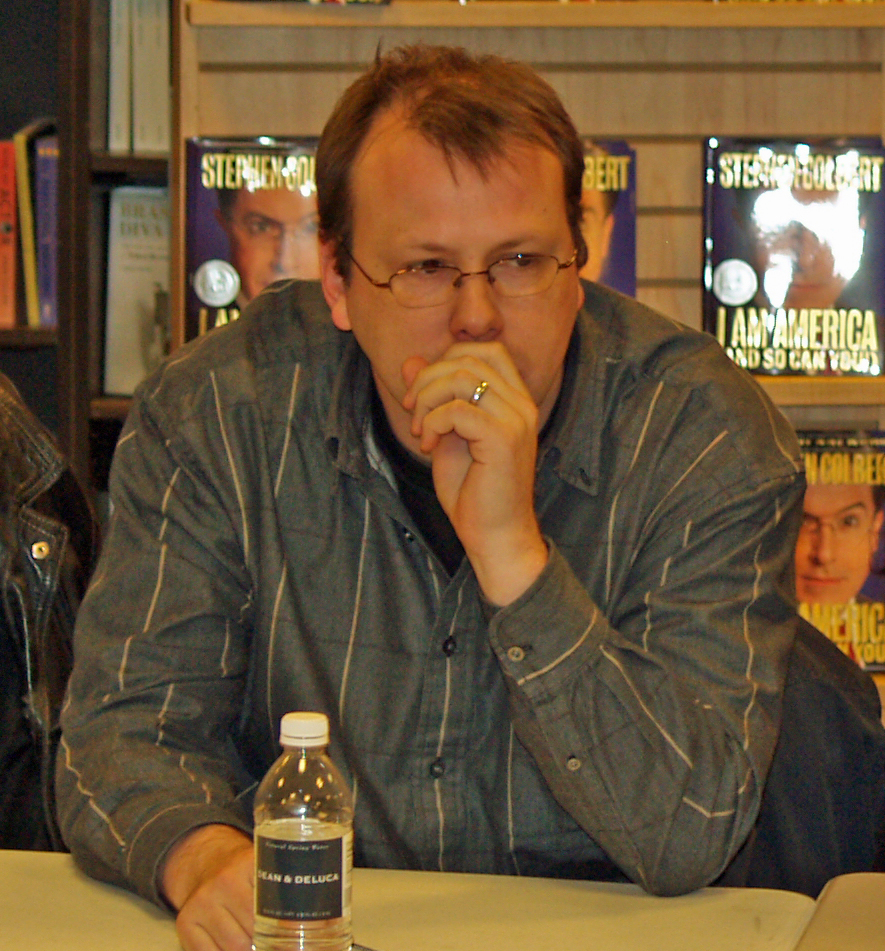
- Born: Richard Dahm
- Education: University of Wisconsin–Madison
- Occupation: Comedy writer
- Years active: 1990s-present
- Known for: The Cultural Idiocy Quiz
- Awards: Multiple Emmy Awards for The Colbert Report

Richard Dahm (often credited as Rich Dahm) is an Emmy-winning American comedy writer from Wisconsin, most well-known for his work on The Colbert Report and The Middle.

== Career ==
After graduating from University of Wisconsin–Madison in 1989, Dahm became one of the first writers for the satirical newspaper The Onion. From 1990 to 1994, he was its de facto manager. Lacking funds to invest in The Onion and unable to live on its meager paychecks, Dahm left to Los Angeles to instead pursue a career in television writing and production.

Dahm was co-executive producer and head writer for The Colbert Report from 2005 to 2013, helping launch the series from its earliest days as a spinoff of The Daily Show. In addition to his work on the show itself, he also worked on many of the series' spinoff productions including Colbert's books I Am America (And So Can You!) and America Again: Re-Becoming the Greatness We Never Weren't, the live Rally to Restore Sanity and/or Fear on the National Mall in Washington, D.C., A Colbert Christmas: The Greatest Gift of All!, and the 2006 White House Correspondents' Dinner. He has stated that his favorite moment on the show was Colbert's mock feud with indie rock group the Decemberists which culminated in a guitar solo competition on the show's final episode of the year, featuring guest appearances from guitarist Peter Frampton and Dr. Henry Kissinger.

He was co-executive producer on the sitcom The Middle from 2014 to 2018.

He has written 11 episodes of the animated series The Croods: Family Tree.

He also wrote for Dennis Miller Live, Da Ali G Show, and Space Ghost Coast to Coast.

== Awards ==
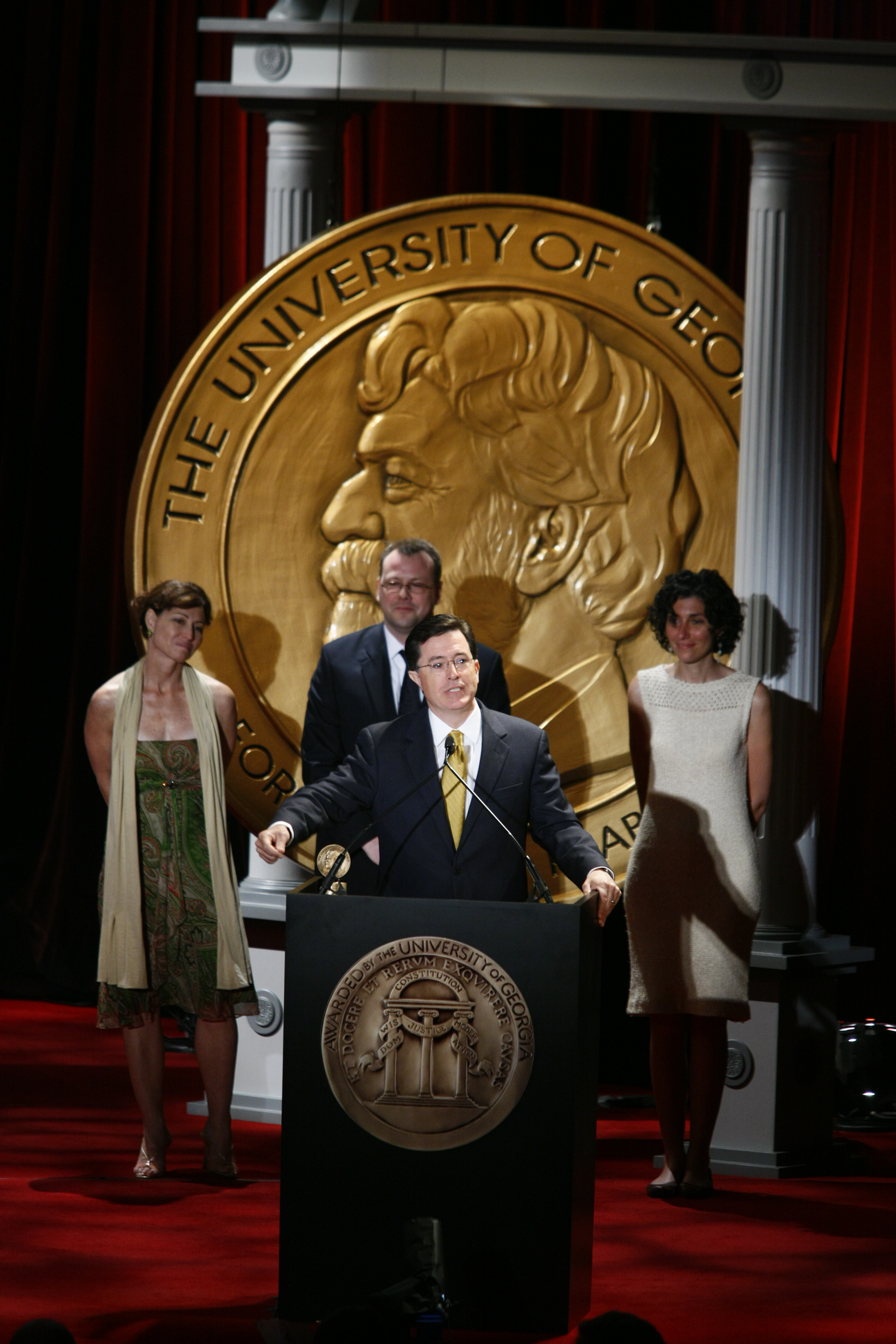
Dahm stands behind Stephen Colbert at the Peabody Awards in 2008

Dahm has won six Emmy Awards: Four in the category of Outstanding Writing for a Variety Series four times for The Colbert Report in 2008, 2010, 2013, and 2014, and shared the show's awards for Outstanding Variety Series in 2013 and 2014 as co-executive producer. He was nominated 13 further times for writing for Colbert and Da Ali G Show.

He also shared in the show's two Peabody Awards, four Writers Guild of America Awards, and seven Producers Guild of America Awards.

== Works ==
- I Am America (And So Can You!) with Stephen Colbert, Paul Dinello, Allison Silverman (Grand Central Publishing, 2007)
- America Again: Re-Becoming the Greatness We Never Weren't with Stephen Colbert, Paul Dinello (Grand Central Publishing, 2012)
- Fanfare for the Area Man: The Onion Ad Nauseam Complete News Archives, Vol. 15 (Three Rivers Press, 2004)
- The Cultural Idiocy Quiz (Adams Media Corp., 1997)

== Podcast appearances ==
- How To Write Funny with Scott Dikkers, Episode 9: Rich Dahm (August 2, 2015)
