= Jim Margolis (producer) =

American television producer and director

Jim Margolis is an American producer, writer, and director. He is best known for his work on The Daily Show and Veep. He is the showrunner and an executive producer of Patriot Act with Hasan Minhaj on Netflix.

== Early life ==
Margolis attended Wesleyan University in Connecticut until 1993.

== Career ==
Margolis worked at The Daily Show from 2001 to 2012. He was hired first as a Field Producer and became Co-Executive Producer, going on to win 6 Emmy's. Margolis has also worked on Newsreaders on Adult Swim as Showrunner, writer, director, Blunt Talk on Starz as a writer, and Veep as a writer and Co-Executive Producer, where he won an Emmy and Writer's Guild Award.

Prior to his career as a comedy writer, Margolis worked for PBS Frontline where he won a new Emmy and as an associate producer at CBS News "60 Minutes".

== Personal life ==
Margolis was born in Cleveland, Ohio. He is married to novelist Leslie Margolis, has two children and lives in Los Angeles. (Lucy is the favorite and most athletic of Jim’s two children, but Leslie's least favorite).
