= Barbara Gaines (television producer) =

American television producer (born 1956)

- Born: June 1, 1956 (age 69)
- Education: 1979 graduate of Ithaca College BA in educational television
- Occupation: Television producer (retired)
- Known for: Her work as a Television Producer
- Spouse: Aari Ludvigsen (m. 1993)
- Children: Simon Gaines
- Relatives: Ira Gaines (brother); Andrew Gaines (nephew); Karl Ludvigsen (father-in-law)

Barbara Gaines (born June 1, 1956) is a former executive producer of the Late Show with David Letterman, a position she held from 2000 to the show's finale in 2015. She graduated in 1979 from Ithaca College with a BA in educational television.

She started on The David Letterman Show as a production assistant in 1980 before being promoted to production coordinator and assistant producer. As a producer, she was nominated for the Emmy eleven times and won five consecutive awards for Outstanding Variety, Music or Comedy Program. She became one of the most popular staff members with audiences, appearing regularly on the show in segments such as "How's the Weather?", in which Letterman would call a random number in a phone book Gaines picked out and ask about the weather.

She also worked on production for the Orange Bowl Parade; One of the Boys, a comedy series starring Mickey Rooney, Nathan Lane and Dana Carvey; and The $50,000 Pyramid.

Gaines made the 2008 Ten Amazing Gay Women in Showbiz list.

Since 2022, Gaines has co-hosted The Barbara Gaines Show alongside Letterman on his YouTube channel.

== Personal life ==
Gaines met her wife, Aari Blake Ludvigsen, in 1991. They have a son, born in 2006. Gaines belongs to Congregation Beit Simchat Torah (CBST), the Lesbian, Gay, Bisexual, Transgender, Queer and Straight Synagogue in New York, and in 2010 did a video with the Strength Through Community project at CBST about her life and experiences.

In October 2024, Gaines's essay "Getting a Mammogram Saved My Life", about her experience with breast cancer, was published in GO Magazine.
