= Ken Aymong =

American television producer

Ken Aymong is an American television producer. He has worked as a producer for Saturday Night Live from 1985 to 2021 and returned in 2025.

Aymong originally joined the show as an associate producer in 1985 and rose to the rank of supervising producer in 1987. He retired in 2021..

He worked as Production Manager from 1982-1985, as Associate Producer from 1985-1988, as Supervising Producer from 1988-2021. In 2025, he returned as a supervising producer for the 51st season.
