= Kahane Cooperman =

American documentary filmmaker, television director and producer

Kahane Corn Cooperman
- Born: Kahane Rachel Corn
- Occupations: Documentary Filmmaker and Television Director and Producer
- Website: www.kahanecooperman.com

Kahane Corn Cooperman is an American documentary filmmaker and television director and producer, whose 2016 documentary Joe's Violin was nominated for an Academy Award for Best Documentary Short Subject.

== Early life ==
Cooperman was born Kahane Rachel Corn, the daughter of Beatrice and Dr. David Corn. She is a graduate of Walt Whitman High School in Bethesda, Maryland.

== Education ==
Cooperman graduated with a B.A. in English from the University of Chicago and later a Masters of Fine Arts in film from Columbia University.

== Career ==
Kahane Corn Cooperman is an Academy Award-nominated documentary filmmaker and Emmy and Peabody award-winning producer, director and showrunner. She is known for her focus on emotional, intimate, powerful storytelling whether the subject be serious or humorous and has made films on subjects as wide-ranging as mental health, civility’s role in a democracy, life with autism, the making of a cult film, and ice sculpting. Her latest feature doc Creede U.S.A. had its world premiere at the SXSW Film and TV Festival in March 2025.

Kahane began her documentary career answering the phones at the renowned Maysles Films, where she made her first film, editing it at night and on weekends. That short doc Cool Water premiered at the Sundance Film Festival. For the next few years she continued making her own films and working on others when her professional life took an unexpected turn. From 1996-2015, she had an integral role on the acclaimed television program The Daily Show with Jon Stewart, where she was first hired as a field producer based on her doc experience and rose through the ranks to become Co-Executive Producer from 2005-2015. For her work at The Daily Show, she received eleven primetime Emmy awards and three Peabody awards. But nothing replaced her love of non-fiction filmmaking. While she was at The Daily Show, she directed and produced the documentary Making Dazed about Richard Linklater’s cult classic film Dazed and Confused. She also started a short doc, about a donated violin, which would become the Academy Award-nominated, multi-award winning, fest fave Joe’s Violin in 2017.

More recently, Kahane was an executive producer and a story director for Oprah and Prince Harry’s mental health series The Me You Can’t See on Apple TV+. In spring of 2021, she directed the short doc series “Debunking Borat” for Sacha Baron Cohen and Amazon. Her award-winning feature documentary The Antidote which she produced and directed with John Hoffman premiered on Amazon in late 2020. Prior, she executive produced and directed multiple short documentaries about autism for Jon Stewart’s Emmy-nominated Night of Too Many Stars on HBO. That same year, Kahane was the showrunner, executive producer, and a director of the Sundance Channel's 4-hour non-fiction true crime series Cold Blooded: The Clutter Family Murders with Joe Berlinger and Radical Media. Kahane was also the executive producer and showrunner of The New Yorker Presents, an 11-episode series for Amazon with Alex Gibney’s Jigsaw Productions, which premiered at the 2016 Sundance Film Festival.
