= Allison Silverman =

American comedy writer and producer

- Born: February 17, 1972 (age 54); Gainesville, Florida, U.S.
- Education: Yale University
- Occupations: Comedy writer; producer
- Writing career
- Period: Contemporary
- Notable works: Russian Doll; Unbreakable Kimmy Schmidt; Schmigadoon! The Colbert Report; The Daily Show

Allison Silverman (born February 17, 1972) is an American comedy writer and producer, known for her television work on Russian Doll, Unbreakable Kimmy Schmidt, and Late Night with Conan O'Brien. She was the head writer and executive producer for The Colbert Report until 2009. In 2011, she was an executive producer and writer of Portlandia. She is co-creator of the comedy series Schmigadoon!, and was a writer for the television series At Home with Amy Sedaris, The Office, and The Daily Show.

== Early life ==
Silverman graduated from Buchholz High School in Gainesville, Florida in 1990 and from Yale University in 1994.

== Professional career ==
Silverman has written for The Daily Show with Jon Stewart and Late Night with Conan O'Brien. She has received several Emmy nominations for her work on these three shows, including two wins for her work on The Daily Show and The Colbert Report.

Silverman attended Yale University in the early 1990s, where she was involved in one of the college's improvisational comedy groups, The Ex!t Players. After graduating in 1994 with a degree in humanities, she made her way to Chicago. She performed at Chicago's iO Theater (then known as ImprovOlympic), and later at the Boom Chicago theater in Amsterdam. In Chicago, Silverman got her start writing at a company called Jellyvision for a trivia game called You Don't Know Jack. While in Chicago, Silverman was hired as a writer for the television show Who Wants to Be a Millionaire, which prompted her to move to New York. Shortly thereafter, she was hired as a writer for The Daily Show.

Silverman won an Emmy and a Peabody Award as a member of The Daily Show's writing staff before joining Late Night in 2002. During this period, Silverman was notably the only female writer on staff for both The Daily Show and Late Night with Conan O'Brien. She moved to The Colbert Report in 2005 shortly after it was picked up to series. Although most of Silverman's work on the Report was off-camera, she occasionally made appearances on the show, as an audience member, as the voice of the alien woman "Juliax" in a Tek Jansen cartoon, and as "Your Soulmate" in the abridged audiobook of I Am America (And So Can You!), which she co-wrote. Silverman's contributions to The Colbert Report would win the show a Peabody Award, an Emmy Award, and multiple Emmy nominations. Stephen Colbert has said that she has "the mind of Jonathan Swift had he mated with the Cookie Monster."

She was a 2009 recipient of NYWIFT's Muse Award, celebrating the achievements of women who work in film and television. She left The Colbert Report in August 2009.

In 2011 Silverman was a writer for the comedy series Portlandia, and served as co-executive producer for the show's next season in 2012. In an interview, Carrie Brownstein reflected about the encouragement that she received from Silverman on the first season of Portlandia:

"I try to sort of model what she did for me in my own life, which was just to listen, to understand that there is that fear when you first enter a room—a figurative or literal room—where you're kind of forced to speak in a different register. I really am so grateful for her generosity and kindness."

In March 2011, Silverman was a writer and contributor on the radio program This American Life in an episode titled "Oh You Shouldn't Have".

Between the years of 2011–2013, Silverman was a writer on The Office, before she began working as executive producer on the comedy series Unbreakable Kimmy Schmidt. She was a writer and producer on the show from 2015 to 2017. She was also a writer on the Apple TV+ musical comedy series Schmigadoon! which stars Cecily Strong.

Silverman was a writer and producer on both first and second seasons Russian Doll series, which premiered in 2019 and 2022, respectively. Silverman was named a finalist for the 2019 Ray Bradbury Award for Dramatic Presentation for her work on the episode "The Way Out", as well as receive an Emmy nomination for Outstanding Writing for a Comedy Series for the episode "A Warm Body".

In 2022 it was reported that Silverman is working with writer George Saunders on a pilot for the short story series CivilWarLand in Bad Decline, as well as an adaptation of David Goodwillie's Kings County.

== Personal life ==
Silverman married Adrian Jones in 2009.

== Filmography ==
=== Television ===
Filmography
Year	Title	Writer	Executive Producer	Notes	Ref.
2000	Who Wants to Be a Millionaire	Yes	No		
2000–2008	The Daily Show	Yes	No	Winner – 2000 Peabody Award; Winner – 2001 Emmy Award for Outstanding Writing for a Variety, Music, or Comedy Program (Writer)	
2002–2005	Late Night with Conan O'Brien	Yes	No	Nominated – 2002, 2003, 2004, 2005 Emmy Award for Outstanding Writing for a Variety, Music, or Comedy Program (Writer)	
2005–2009	The Colbert Report	Yes	Yes	Nominated – 2006 Emmy Award for Outstanding Writing for a Variety, Music, Or Comedy Program (Head Writer); Nominated – 2006 Emmy Award for Outstanding Variety, Music Or Comedy Series (Supervising Producer); Winner – 2007 Peabody Award; Nominated – 2007 Emmy Award for Outstanding Variety, Music Or Comedy Series (Co-Executive Producer); Nominated – 2007 Emmy Award for Outstanding Writing for a Variety, Music, Or Comedy Program (Writer); Winner – 2008 Emmy Award for Outstanding Writing For A Variety, Music Or Comedy Program; Nominated – 2008 Emmy Award for Outstanding Variety, Music Or Comedy Series (Executive Producer); Nominated – 2009 Emmy Award for Outstanding Variety, Music Or Comedy Series (Executive Producer); Winner – 2010 Emmy Award for Outstanding Writing For A Variety, Music Or Comedy Program; Nominated – 2010 Emmy Award for Outstanding Variety, Music Or Comedy Series (Executive Producer)	
2011–2012	Portlandia	Yes	Consulting	Winner – 2011 Peabody Award	
2011–2013	The Office	Yes	Co-executive		
2015–2017	Unbreakable Kimmy Schmidt	Yes	Co-executive	Nominated – 2015 Emmy Award for Outstanding Variety, Music Or Comedy Series (Co-Executive Producer); Nominated – 2016 Emmy Award for Outstanding Variety, Music Or Comedy Series (Co-Executive Producer); Nominated – 2017 Emmy Award for Outstanding Variety, Music Or Comedy Series (Co-Executive Producer)	
2019	At Home with Amy Sedaris	Yes	Co-executive		
2019–2022	Russian Doll	Yes	Yes	Nominated – 2019 Emmy Award for Outstanding Variety, Music Or Comedy Series (Executive Producer); Nominated – 2019 Emmy Award for Outstanding Writing for a Variety, Music, or Comedy Program (Writer); Nominated – 2019 Gotham Award for Breakthrough Series	
2022	Schmigadoon!	Yes	Co-executive		
2022	Minx	No	Co-executive		
2023	The Other Two	Yes	Co-executive		
2025	Too Much	Yes	No	Staff writer	
