= List of Sex and the City episodes =

The following is a list of episodes from the American television series Sex and the City.

For the sequel series, see And Just Like That….

== Series overview ==
Season	Episodes		Originally released	
Season	Episodes		First released	Last released
1	12		June 6, 1998	August 23, 1998
2	18		June 6, 1999	October 3, 1999
3	18		June 4, 2000	October 15, 2000
4	18		June 3, 2001	February 10, 2002
5	8		July 21, 2002	September 8, 2002
6	20	12	June 22, 2003	September 14, 2003
6	20	8	January 4, 2004	February 22, 2004
Films			May 30, 2008	May 27, 2010

== Episodes ==
=== Season 1 (1998) ===
No. overall	No. in season	Title	Directed by	Written by	Original release date	Prod. code
1	1	"Sex and the City"	Susan Seidelman	Darren Star	June 6, 1998	100
2	2	"Models and Mortals"	Alison Maclean	Darren Star	June 6, 1998	101
3	3	"Bay of Married Pigs"	Nicole Holofcener	Michael Patrick King	June 21, 1998	102
4	4	"Valley of the Twenty-Something Guys"	Alison Maclean	Michael Patrick King	June 28, 1998	103
5	5	"The Power of Female Sex"	Susan Seidelman	Story by : Jenji Kohan; Teleplay by : Darren Star	July 5, 1998	104
6	6	"Secret Sex"	Michael Fields	Darren Star	July 12, 1998	105
7	7	"The Monogamists"	Darren Star	Darren Star	July 19, 1998	106
8	8	"Three's a Crowd"	Nicole Holofcener	Jenny Bicks	July 26, 1998	107
9	9	"The Turtle and the Hare"	Michael Fields	Nicole Avril & Susan Kolinsky	August 2, 1998	108
10	10	"The Baby Shower"	Susan Seidelman	Terri Minsky	August 9, 1998	109
11	11	"The Drought"	Matthew Harrison	Michael Green & Michael Patrick King	August 16, 1998	110
12	12	"Oh Come All Ye Faithful"	Matthew Harrison	Michael Patrick King	August 23, 1998	111

=== Season 2 (1999) ===
No. overall	No. in season	Title	Directed by	Written by	Original release date	Prod. code
13	1	"Take Me Out to the Ballgame"	Allen Coulter	Michael Patrick King	June 6, 1999	201
14	2	"The Awful Truth"	Allen Coulter	Darren Star	June 13, 1999	202
15	3	"The Freak Show"	Allen Coulter	Jenny Bicks	June 20, 1999	203
16	4	"They Shoot Single People, Don't They?"	John David Coles	Michael Patrick King	June 27, 1999	204
17	5	"Four Women and a Funeral"	Allen Coulter	Jenny Bicks	July 4, 1999	205
18	6	"The Cheating Curve"	John David Coles	Darren Star	July 11, 1999	206
19	7	"The Chicken Dance"	Victoria Hochberg	Cindy Chupack	July 18, 1999	207
20	8	"The Man, The Myth, The Viagra"	Victoria Hochberg	Michael Patrick King	July 25, 1999	208
21	9	"Old Dogs, New Dicks" "Old Dogs, New Tricks"	Alan Taylor	Jenny Bicks	August 1, 1999	209
22	10	"The Caste System"	Allison Anders	Darren Star	August 8, 1999	210
23	11	"Evolution"	Pam Thomas	Cindy Chupack	August 15, 1999	211
24	12	"La Douleur Exquise!"	Allison Anders	Ollie Levy & Michael Patrick King	August 22, 1999	212
25	13	"Games People Play"	Michael Spiller	Jenny Bicks	August 29, 1999	213
26	14	"The Fuck Buddy" "The Sex Buddy"	Alan Taylor	Darren Star	September 5, 1999	214
27	15	"Shortcomings"	Dan Algrant	Terri Minsky	September 12, 1999	215
28	16	"Was It Good For You?"	Dan Algrant	Michael Patrick King	September 19, 1999	216
29	17	"Twenty-Something Girls vs. Thirty-Something Women"	Darren Star	Darren Star	September 26, 1999	217
30	18	"Ex and the City"	Michael Patrick King	Michael Patrick King	October 3, 1999	218

=== Season 3 (2000) ===
No. overall	No. in season	Title	Directed by	Written by	Original release date	Prod. code	U.S. viewers (millions)
31	1	"Where There's Smoke..."	Michael Patrick King	Michael Patrick King	June 4, 2000	301	N/A
32	2	"Politically Erect"	Michael Patrick King	Darren Star	June 11, 2000	302	3.60
33	3	"Attack of the 5'10" Woman"	Pam Thomas	Cindy Chupack	June 18, 2000	303	3.98
34	4	"Boy, Girl, Boy, Girl..."	Pam Thomas	Jenny Bicks	June 25, 2000	304	3.69
35	5	"No Ifs, Ands, or Butts"	Nicole Holofcener	Michael Patrick King	July 9, 2000	305	3.97
36	6	"Are We Sluts?"	Allison Anders	Cindy Chupack	July 16, 2000	306	N/A
37	7	"Drama Queens"	Allison Anders	Darren Star	July 23, 2000	307	4.56
38	8	"The Big Time"	Allison Anders	Jenny Bicks	July 30, 2000	308	3.93
39	9	"Easy Come, Easy Go"	Charles McDougall	Michael Patrick King	August 6, 2000	309	3.50
40	10	"All or Nothing"	Charles McDougall	Jenny Bicks	August 13, 2000	310	4.42
41	11	"Running with Scissors"	Dennis Erdman	Michael Patrick King	August 20, 2000	311	4.64
42	12	"Don't Ask, Don't Tell"	Dan Algrant	Cindy Chupack	August 27, 2000	312	4.16
43	13	"Escape from New York"	John David Coles	Becky Hartman Edwards & Michael Patrick King	September 10, 2000	313	4.20
44	14	"Sex and Another City"	John David Coles	Jenny Bicks	September 17, 2000	314	4.76
45	15	"Hot Child in the City"	Michael Spiller	Allan Heinberg	September 24, 2000	315	4.94
46	16	"Frenemies"	Michael Spiller	Jenny Bicks	October 1, 2000	316	5.35
47	17	"What Goes Around Comes Around"	Allen Coulter	Darren Star	October 8, 2000	317	N/A
48	18	"Cock a Doodle Do!"	Allen Coulter	Michael Patrick King	October 15, 2000	318	4.71

=== Season 4 (2001–02) ===
No. overall	No. in season	Title	Directed by	Written by	Original release date	Prod. code	U.S. viewers (millions)
49	1	"The Agony and the 'Ex'-tacy"	Michael Patrick King	Michael Patrick King	June 3, 2001	401	6.49
50	2	"The Real Me"	Michael Patrick King	Michael Patrick King	June 3, 2001	402	5.93
51	3	"Defining Moments"	Allen Coulter	Jenny Bicks	June 10, 2001	403	5.48
52	4	"What's Sex Got to Do with It?"	Allen Coulter	Nicole Avril	June 17, 2001	404	5.13
53	5	"Ghost Town"	Michael Spiller	Allan Heinberg	June 24, 2001	405	5.84
54	6	"Baby, Talk Is Cheap"	Michael Spiller	Cindy Chupack	July 1, 2001	406	5.47
55	7	"Time and Punishment"	Michael Engler	Jessica Bendinger	July 8, 2001	407	5.59
56	8	"My Motherboard, My Self"	Michael Engler	Julie Rottenberg & Elisa Zuritsky	July 15, 2001	408	5.37
57	9	"Sex and the Country"	Michael Spiller	Allan Heinberg	July 22, 2001	409	5.80
58	10	"Belles of the Balls"	Michael Spiller	Michael Patrick King	July 29, 2001	410	5.98
59	11	"Coulda, Woulda, Shoulda"	David Frankel	Jenny Bicks	August 5, 2001	411	5.87
60	12	"Just Say Yes"	David Frankel	Cindy Chupack	August 12, 2001	412	6.64
61	13	"The Good Fight"	Charles McDougall	Michael Patrick King	January 6, 2002	413	7.30
62	14	"All That Glitters"	Charles McDougall	Cindy Chupack	January 13, 2002	414	6.81
63	15	"Change of a Dress"	Alan Taylor	Julie Rottenberg & Elisa Zuritsky	January 20, 2002	415	5.02
64	16	"Ring a Ding Ding"	Alan Taylor	Amy B. Harris	January 27, 2002	416	7.20
65	17	"A 'Vogue' Idea"	Martha Coolidge	Allan Heinberg	February 3, 2002	417	4.34
66	18	"I Heart NY"	Martha Coolidge	Michael Patrick King	February 10, 2002	418	7.39

=== Season 5 (2002) ===
No. overall	No. in season	Title	Directed by	Written by	Original release date	Prod. code	U.S. viewers (millions)
67	1	"Anchors Away"	Charles McDougall	Michael Patrick King	July 21, 2002	501	7.93
68	2	"Unoriginal Sin"	Charles McDougall	Cindy Chupack	July 28, 2002	502	6.63
69	3	"Luck Be an Old Lady"	John David Coles	Julie Rottenberg & Elisa Zuritsky	August 4, 2002	503	6.59
70	4	"Cover Girl"	John David Coles	Judy Toll & Michael Patrick King	August 11, 2002	504	7.31
71	5	"Plus One Is the Loneliest Number"	Michael Patrick King	Cindy Chupack	August 18, 2002	505	6.95
72	6	"Critical Condition"	Michael Patrick King	Alexa Junge	August 25, 2002	506	7.38
73	7	"The Big Journey"	Michael Engler	Michael Patrick King	September 1, 2002	507	5.95
74	8	"I Love a Charade"	Michael Engler	Cindy Chupack & Michael Patrick King	September 8, 2002	508	7.33

=== Season 6 (2003–04) ===
No. overall	No. in season	Title	Directed by	Written by	Original release date	Prod. code	U.S. viewers (millions)
Part 1
75	1	"To Market, to Market"	Michael Patrick King	Michael Patrick King	June 22, 2003	601	7.30
76	2	"Great Sexpectations"	Michael Patrick King	Cindy Chupack	June 29, 2003	602	5.82
77	3	"The Perfect Present"	David Frankel	Jenny Bicks	July 6, 2003	603	6.95
78	4	"Pick-a-Little, Talk-a-Little"	David Frankel	Julie Rottenberg & Elisa Zuritsky	July 13, 2003	604	6.60
79	5	"Lights, Camera, Relationship!"	Michael Engler	Michael Patrick King	July 20, 2003	605	6.43
80	6	"Hop, Skip, and a Week"	Michael Engler	Amy B. Harris	July 27, 2003	606	6.34
81	7	"The Post-It Always Sticks Twice"	Alan Taylor	Liz Tuccillo	August 3, 2003	607	5.77
82	8	"The Catch"	Alan Taylor	Cindy Chupack	August 10, 2003	608	6.64
83	9	"A Woman's Right to Shoes"	Tim Van Patten	Jenny Bicks	August 17, 2003	609	6.74
84	10	"Boy, Interrupted"	Tim Van Patten	Cindy Chupack	August 24, 2003	610	6.94
85	11	"The Domino Effect"	David Frankel	Julie Rottenberg & Elisa Zuritsky	September 7, 2003	611	6.69
86	12	"One"	David Frankel	Michael Patrick King	September 14, 2003	612	7.65
Part 2
87	13	"Let There Be Light"	Michael Patrick King	Michael Patrick King	January 4, 2004	613	6.36
88	14	"The Ick Factor"	Wendey Stanzler	Julie Rottenberg & Elisa Zuritsky	January 11, 2004	614	N/A
89	15	"Catch-38"	Michael Engler	Cindy Chupack	January 18, 2004	615	N/A
90	16	"Out of the Frying Pan"	Michael Engler	Jenny Bicks	January 25, 2004	616	5.54
91	17	"The Cold War"	Julian Farino	Aury Wallington	February 1, 2004	617	4.43
92	18	"Splat!"	Julian Farino	Jenny Bicks & Cindy Chupack	February 8, 2004	618	4.83
93	19	"An American Girl in Paris (Part Une)"	Tim Van Patten	Michael Patrick King	February 15, 2004	619	6.14
94	20	"An American Girl in Paris (Part Deux)"	Tim Van Patten	Michael Patrick King	February 22, 2004	620	10.62

== Films (2008–2010) ==
Title	Directed by	Written by	Release date (U.S.)
Sex and the City	Michael Patrick King	Michael Patrick King	May 30, 2008
Four years after the events of the Paris finale, Carrie, Samantha, Charlotte and Miranda continue to balance their careers, relationships and motherhood. When Carrie is unexpectedly stood up by Big at their wedding, the girls rally to support their friend. Samantha has relocated to Los Angeles with Smith (Jason Lewis) and is forced to admit that she is lonely and misses her single lifestyle. Charlotte is overjoyed when she falls pregnant. Miranda is heartbroken when she finds out that Steve (David Eigenberg) has cheated on her.
Sex and the City 2	Michael Patrick King	Story by : Darren Star; Screenplay by : Michael Patrick King	May 27, 2010
Two years after the events of the previous film, Carrie, Samantha, Charlotte and Miranda go on a trip to Abu Dhabi. While there, Carrie runs into her former boyfriend Aidan (John Corbett).
