= List of Sex and the City characters =

Sex and the City is an American cable television program based on the book of the same name by Candace Bushnell. It was originally broadcast on the HBO network from 1998 until 2004. Set in New York City, the show focuses on the sex lives of four female best friends, three of whom are in their mid-to-late thirties, and one of whom is in her forties. Along with these four women, there were numerous minor and recurring characters, including their current and ex-boyfriends/husbands/lovers, as well as many cameo appearances. A follow-up series And Just Like That... began in 2022 with many of the same characters, and some new characters also listed below.

There are also the film adaptations Sex and the City: The Movie (2008) and Sex and the City 2 (2010).

== Main characters ==
= Main cast (credited)
= Starring (billed with starring cast in film series)
= Recurring cast (3+ episodes)
= Guest cast (1-2 episodes)

Portrayed by	Character	Sex and the City						Film series		And Just Like That...		
Portrayed by	Character	Season 1	Season 2	Season 3	Season 4	Season 5	Season 6	Movie 1	Movie 2	Season 1	Season 2	Season 3
Lead role
Sarah Jessica Parker	Carrie Bradshaw	Main	Main	Main	Main	Main	Main	Main	Main	Main	Main	Main
Kim Cattrall	Samantha Jones	Main	Main	Main	Main	Main	Main	Main	Main		Guest	
Kristin Davis	Charlotte York	Main	Main	Main	Main	Main	Main	Main	Main	Main	Main	Main
Cynthia Nixon	Miranda Hobbes	Main	Main	Main	Main	Main	Main	Main	Main	Main	Main	Main
Supporting
Chris Noth	John James "Mr. Big" Preston	Recurring	Recurring	Recurring	Recurring	Guest	Recurring	Starring	Starring	Main (Note: Noth is only credited as "Starring" in the first two episodes. He was also set to appear in the tenth episode, but was edited out following sexual assault allegations that were brought against him.)		
David Eigenberg	Steve Brady		Recurring	Recurring	Recurring	Recurring	Recurring	Starring	Starring	Main	Main	Main
Evan Handler	Harry Goldenblatt					Recurring	Recurring	Starring	Starring	Main	Main	Main
Jason Lewis	Jerry "Smith" Jerrod						Recurring	Starring	Starring			
Mario Cantone	Anthony Marentino			Guest	Guest	Recurring	Recurring	Starring	Starring	Main	Main	Main
Lynn Cohen	Magda			Guest	Guest	Recurring	Recurring	Starring	Starring			
Willie Garson	Stanford Blatch	Recurring	Recurring	Recurring	Guest	Recurring	Recurring	Starring	Starring	Main (Note: Garson is only credited as "Starring" in the first three episodes.)		
Jennifer Hudson	Louise							Starring				
Candice Bergen	Enid Frick				Guest	Guest	Guest	Starring			Guest	
John Corbett	Aidan Shaw			Recurring	Recurring		Guest		Starring		Main	Main
Sara Ramirez	Che Diaz									Main	Main	
Sarita Choudhury	Seema Patel									Main	Main	Main
Cathy Ang	Lily Goldenblatt						Photo	Appears (Note: Portrayed by Alexandra Fong and Parker Fong.)	Appears	Recurring	Main	Main
Niall Cunningham	Brady Hobbes				Guest (Note: Portrayed by unknown child actor.)	Recurring (Note: Portrayed by unknown child actor.)	Recurring	Appears (Note: Portrayed by Joseph Pupo.)	Appears	Recurring	Main	Main
Chris Jackson	Herbert Wexley									Recurring	Main	Main
Nicole Ari Parker	Lisa Todd Wexley									Recurring	Main	Main
Alexa Swinton	Rose "Rock" Goldenblatt (Note: The character of Rock Goldenblatt was formerly known as Rose Goldenblatt.)							Appears (Note: Portrayed by unknown child actor.)	Appears (Note: Portrayed by Liliana and Sabrina Pizzuto.)	Recurring	Main	Main
Karen Pittman	Nya Wallace									Recurring	Main	
Sebastiano Pigazzi	Giuseppe										Recurring	Main
Dolly Wells	Joy										Guest	Main

=== Carrie Bradshaw ===
Carrie Bradshaw (born October 10, 1966), is the literal voice of the show, as each episode is structured around her train of thought while writing her weekly column, "Sex and the City", for the fictitious newspaper, The New York Star. A member of the New York glitterati, she is a club/bar/restaurant staple known for her unique fashion sense, yoking together various styles into one outfit. A self-proclaimed shoe fetishist, she focuses most of her attention and finances on designer footwear, primarily Manolo Blahnik, though she has been known to wear Christian Louboutin and Jimmy Choo. She often goes on shopping sprees, and pays much attention to her evolving and bold dress style, which is not fettered by professional dress codes. Although her only income is from her freelance weekly newspaper column, she often overspends her limit and maxes out her credit card in a single shopping trip. To some viewers, her lack of shoe-shopping self-control and overall seemingly immature spending might be a flaw, and her money management misadventures follow her through a few episodes. However, her priorities are later brought into perspective when she is forced to buy her once rent-controlled apartment to avoid moving out when the building goes co-op; she acquires a mortgage by supplementing her income with other writing assignments, and takes a sizeable loan from Charlotte in the form of Charlotte's engagement ring to Trey. Her apartment is her home for the entire series and is another source of pride; it is an open-planned studio in an Upper East Side brownstone that is enviable for its stabilized rent, space, large closet, and good location. She eventually purchases back the apartment from Aidan in the fourth season. In later seasons, her essays are collected as a book, and she begins taking assignments from other publications, like Vogue and New York, as well.

=== Charlotte York ===
Charlotte York (born January 23, 1967), is an art dealer and graduate of Smith College with a wealthy Connecticut blue-blooded upbringing. She is the most conservative and traditional of the group, the one who places the most emphasis on emotional love as opposed to lust, and is always searching for her "knight in shining armor". As the youngest of the group, she is also the most idealistic about romance and love. Presenting a more straightforward attitude about relationships, usually based on "the rules" of love and dating, she often scoffs at the lewder, more libertine antics that the show presents (primarily by way of Samantha), but despite her conservative outlook, she makes concessions (while married) that even surprise her sexually freer girlfriends (such as her level of dirty talk, oral sex in public and "tuchus-lingus"). She gives up her career soon after her first marriage, divorces upon irreconcilable differences around in vitro fertilization and receives a Park Avenue apartment in the divorce settlement. She eventually remarries to her less than perfect, but good-hearted divorce lawyer, Harry Goldenblatt, after converting to Judaism. In the final episode, they adopt a daughter from China, Lily, and in the first movie, Charlotte gives birth to daughter Rose, with Harry proclaiming, "now we have a Lily and a Rose!".

=== Miranda Hobbes ===
Miranda Hobbes (born July 27, 1966), is a career-minded lawyer with extremely cynical views on relationships and men. A Harvard University graduate from Philadelphia, she is Carrie's confidante and voice of reason. In the early seasons, she is portrayed as masculine and borderline misandric, but this image softens over the years, particularly after she becomes pregnant by her on again-off again boyfriend, Steve Brady, whom she eventually marries. The birth of her son, Brady, brings up new issues for her Type A, workaholic personality, but she soon finds a way to balance career, being single and motherhood. Of the four women, she is the first to purchase an apartment, (an indicator of her success), which she leaves in the final season to move to a larger home in Brooklyn with Steve and Brady.

=== Samantha Jones ===
Samantha Jones (born April 28, 1958), the oldest of the group, is an independent publicist and a seductress who avoids emotional involvement at all costs, while satisfying every possible carnal desire imaginable. She believes that she has had "hundreds" of soulmates and insists that her sexual partners leave "an hour after I climax." In Season 3, she moves from her full-service Upper East Side apartment to an expensive loft in the then-burgeoning Meatpacking District. Over the course of the show, she does have a handful of real relationships, but they are more unconventional than those of her friends, including a lesbian relationship with Brazilian painter played by Sonia Braga.

== Significant others ==
=== Significant others of Carrie Bradshaw ===
==== Mr. Big ====
John James "Mr. Big" Preston (Chris Noth) is Carrie's central relationship. They first meet in season one but then have a nasty break up because he doesn't say what she wants to hear ('You're the one'). In season two they start to date again but it, again, ends badly due to Mr. Big moving to Paris with work and not telling Carrie until a few days prior. When Big returns, Carrie discovers that, whilst in Paris, he got engaged to a 25-year-old woman named Natasha, whom he later married. In season 3 she meets Aidan Shaw who she cheats on with Big while he is still with Natasha. They broke up when Natasha fell chasing Carrie and hurt her mouth. Two years later Big moved to Napa but called Carrie from time to time. Six years after they first met, Carrie was in Paris with Aleksandr Petrovsky when Big declares his love for her. He finds her in the hotel after her fight with Aleksandr and they go back to New York together.

Four years later, in the first film, they became engaged and Big buys Carrie a large penthouse. At the wedding, he backs out at the last minute, leaving Carrie devastated. A couple of months later, they reconcile when she discovers romantic emails written by him that Louise, her assistant, put in a special folder. She rushed to their penthouse to find Big and they reconciled. Carrie and Big have a small, modest wedding and met her best friends for lunch afterwards.

Two years later, they moved to a more modest but still luxurious apartment in the same building.

==== Aidan Shaw ====
Aidan Shaw (John Corbett) is one of Carrie's long-term boyfriends. He is a good-natured furniture designer who runs his own business, and Mr. Big's emotional opposite. At first, Carrie questions their seemingly perfect relationship, but over time accepts his sincerity. However, Aidan ends their relationship after Carrie confesses her affair with Big. They get back together six months later at Carrie's urging, eventually moving in together. When her apartment building goes co-op, he buys her apartment and the adjoining apartment to combine them into a single shared home. When Carrie finds an engagement ring among Aidan's belongings, she does not like the design and throws up at the prospect of marriage. When Aidan proposes, Carrie is shocked to see a completely different ring. As it turns out, Samantha helped Aidan choose a more beautiful, appealing ring, much to Carrie's delight. Despite her initial misgivings, she accepts his marriage proposal. Carrie then becomes panicked and feels suffocated by the relationship, and Aidan realizes he still does not fully trust Carrie, given her past affair with Big, and they break up for good. A year later, they met on the street, right before her date with a new flame, Jack Berger. It is revealed that Aidan has married Kathy, a fellow furniture designer, and has a son, Tate.

In Sex and the City 2, six years later, Carrie runs into Aidan in Abu Dhabi at a market where he is buying samples for his furniture company. They resolve to meet for dinner to catch up. Aidan reveals that he and Kathy are still happily married. In a moment of passion, they kiss. Carrie stops herself and runs away.

In And Just Like That..., Carrie learns that Aidan lives in Virginia and has divorced Kathy. Carrie contacts Aidan, and he travels to New York City, and they begin dating again. He refuses to enter Carrie's apartment because it rekindles memories of their previous failed relationship and his attempt to turn it into a shared home. Carrie sells her apartment and purchases a townhouse in Gramercy Park to host Aidan and his sons when they visit New York, but after one of Aidan's sons injures himself in a car accident after a fight with Kathy, he tells Carrie he needs to return to Virginia to be there for his sons during their teenage years, but tells her they'll start dating again in five years.

==== Jack Berger ====
Jack Berger (Ron Livingston) is Carrie's intellectual counterpart, a sardonic humorist writer. Hailing from Downer's Grove, Carrie first meets him when he walks into a meeting between her and her publisher. Berger's advice to Miranda when she questions the lack of a phone call after a first date, "He's just not that into you," became a pop culture catchphrase. Berger's and Carrie's relationship is then strained by their career issues; a book deal of his falls through just as her columns are being published as worldwide success in book form. He memorably breaks up with her on a Post-It: "I'm Sorry. I Can't. Don't Hate Me—". They never met again.

==== Aleksandr Petrovsky ====
Aleksandr Petrovsky (Mikhail Baryshnikov), referred to by Carrie occasionally as "The Russian" or "My Lover" is a famous and divorced conceptual artist who becomes Carrie's lover in the final season. He sweeps her off her feet with huge, romantic gestures, beautiful gifts and shows her the foreign pockets of New York that she has never seen before. Her relationship with him brings up all sorts of questions in Carrie's mind about finding love past "a certain age" and whether or not she wants to settle down as a family woman. When he's preparing to return to Paris for a solo exhibit he invites Carrie to come live with him, which, after several deliberations (and one fight) with her friends, she does. While in Paris, Carrie does much sightseeing alone and starts to feel the loneliness of Petrovsky's neglect. After spending so much time on her own, she realizes that he will never reciprocate the level of emotional involvement that she offers because his career will always come first. They break up after he accidentally slaps her in the face. She comes back to New York with Big who went to find her after her friends encouraged him to "go get our girl".

Casting Baryshnikov as Petrovsky was noteworthy because in real life, Candace Bushnell, the author on whom Bradshaw is based, married real-life ballet dancer Charles Askegard of the New York City Ballet.

=== Significant others of Samantha Jones ===
==== James ====
James (James Goodwin) is a man Samantha meets while out by herself at a jazz club. She makes a conscious effort to not sleep with him until she gets to know him first. When they finally do have sex, she discovers that he is under-endowed to the point that she cannot enjoy herself (his fully erect penis is three inches long). She begins pulling it physically and cannot bring herself to tell him—until she is faced with the prospect of couples counseling.

==== Maria Diega Reyes ====
Maria Diega Reyes (Sônia Braga) is a Brazilian sensual artist that Samantha meets at a solo exhibit while admiring her work. Maria is immediately attracted to her, but since Samantha doesn't believe in relationships, they try to maintain a friendship. The chemistry proves to be too strong and it isn't too long before Samantha is introducing her lesbian lover to her stunned friends. At first, Samantha has a great time "getting an education" as Maria teaches her about lesbian sex and how to make an emotional connection while making love. Samantha begins to grow uncomfortable when the relationship talk starts to replace the sexual activity and Maria is equally uncomfortable with Samantha's sexual history, and they separate.

==== Richard Wright ====
Richard Wright (James Remar) is a successful hotel magnate who doesn't believe in monogamy until he meets Samantha. He seduces her, and when their no-strings-attached sexual relationship begins to escalate, both parties struggle to keep their emotional distance. Eventually, they give in and attempt exclusivity, but Samantha becomes suspicious that he is cheating on her. When she does catch him cheating, after putting on a wig and spying on him, she breaks up with him, but eventually takes him back after he begs for her forgiveness. In the end, Samantha still has her doubts about his fidelity, and she breaks up with him, saying "I love you Richard, but I love me more." Towards the end of the series, Richard re-surfaces, admitting that Samantha was the best thing that ever happened to him. But after having sex with him again, she realizes how empty his emotions are and she rejects him for Smith Jerrod.

==== Jerry "Smith" Jerrod ====
Jerry "Smith" Jerrod (Jason Lewis) is a young waiter Samantha seduces in a trendy restaurant called "Raw." She tries to maintain her usual sex-only relationship with him, but he slowly pushes for something more. He is a wannabe actor whose career Samantha jump starts using her PR connections (including changing his name from "Jerry Jerrod" to "Smith Jerrod"), getting him a modeling job that turns into a film role. Just when she thinks Smith's age and experiences aren't enough for her, he gives her unconditional support during her fight with breast cancer. In the final episode, Smith flies back from a film set in Canada just to tell her that he loves her, which she counters with "You have meant more to me than any man I've ever known," which, for Samantha, is a far greater statement.

In the first Sex and the City movie, she breaks up with him in the end after having relocated her business to LA but missing New York City and Carrie, Miranda, and Charlotte. In the second he invites her to be his date to the opening of his new action flick, showing that they remain on good terms.

=== Significant others of Charlotte York ===
==== Trey MacDougal ====
Dr. Trey MacDougal (Kyle MacLachlan) is the archetype of Charlotte's knight in shining armor fantasy. The two met when Trey's cab screeched to a stop in the street to avoid hitting her as she was fleeing a bad date. It was a fairytale beginning; Charlotte was a damsel in distress, he, a knight in a yellow cab.

Trey is a Park Avenue cardiologist with blue blood and deep brown eyes. With his pedigree comes social status, a country house and wealth. With his chiseled chin, his perfectly coiffed hair, and his exceptional manners, he is the perfect model of what Charlotte looks for in a husband.

However, she finds the reality of their life together to be quite different. While on the surface, Trey seems Charlotte's perfect match, behind closed doors the couple faces some real-life problems: Trey is impotent, and his overbearing mother, Bunny (Frances Sternhagen), tries to maintain her power over Trey and drive a wedge between the married couple. They try to work things out and do succeed in conquering his sexual dysfunction. But when they start to have problems conceiving, Trey becomes overwhelmed. On the day when Charlotte succeeds in projecting the ultimate marital bliss—a photo spread in a magazine featuring her Park Avenue apartment—she and Trey split up and he moves back in with his mother.

==== Harry Goldenblatt ====
Harrison "Harry" Goldenblatt (Evan Handler) is Charlotte's divorce lawyer and second love, once divorced, helping bring an end to her marriage to Trey. When beginning divorce proceedings, she found herself unable to be cold-blooded and severe around her extremely attractive lawyer. She asks to switch to a different lawyer in the same firm: Harry Goldenblatt, the antithesis of what she seeks in a man. He was bald, pudgy, messy, sweaty, crude, had poor manners, and had an excess of body hair. But in time, Harry becomes very attracted to Charlotte and seduces her. She declared it "the best sex of my life" and began what she thought to be a meaningless sexual affair with him. However, she began falling for him. Initially, she tried to change him to suit her image of what a man should be, but ultimately she accepted him as he is. After he appreciated her sacrifice for him—converting to Judaism and giving up her dream of being married with him, just to be together—he proposed to her and the two were married. After that, they made an effort to adopt a baby. Finally, they adopt a baby girl from China, naming her Lily.

Four years later, in the first film, Harry and Charlotte finally conceive a child naturally. Charlotte gives birth to daughter Rose, with Harry proclaiming, "now we have a Lily and a Rose."

Two years later, in the second film, Harry and Charlotte are still in love and happy. They hire an attractive Irish nanny named Erin (Alice Eve). Charlotte begins to worry that Harry will be tempted to cheat on her. Harry has no interest in Erin, and it turns out that she is a lesbian.

In And Just Like That... the couple is still happily married, though dealing with various family challenges, including Charlotte going back to work and Harry having to help out at home.

=== Significant others of Miranda Hobbes ===
==== Skipper Johnston ====
Skipper Johnston (Ben Weber) is a geeky, sensitive twenty-something web designer whom Carrie introduces to Miranda. From the moment they meet, Skipper is enamored with Miranda, but Miranda is unimpressed and irritated with him, calling him "Skippy". They date for a short time, before Miranda breaks up with him due to their "being in different places".

==== Steve Brady ====
Steven "Steve" Brady (David Eigenberg) is a bartender introduced in the second season, who has an unconventional on-again, off-again relationship with Miranda Hobbes throughout the remainder of the series. He befriends the former boyfriend of Carrie, Aidan Shaw, and accidentally becomes the father of Miranda's baby boy, Brady Hobbes (Joseph Pupo). They decide to get married in one of the parks in the City after Miranda broke up with Dr Robert Leeds and both moved out from Manhattan to Brooklyn, in New York. Steve repaired a whole house by himself. His mother, Mary Brady (Anne Meara) moved in with them, when she was diagnosed with Alzheimer's disease.

In the first movie, they have marriage problems which leads Steve to cheat on Miranda with another woman. He admits his affair to her, and she moves out temporarily to the former Ukrainian part of the city. For a couple of months, the couple live separately and Miranda couldn't stand seeing him. Convinced by her friends, and then Steve, they went to the see a marriage therapist (Joanna Gleason) and they both decided to overcome their crisis by reconciling halfway across the Brooklyn Bridge, which then leads to them having passionate sex in their house in Brooklyn.

In the second film, two years later, they seem to be happy. Miranda, frustrated by her lack of work-life balance and feeling underappreciated at her job decides to quit and spend more time with her family.

In the sequel series And Just Like That..., Steve is suffering from hearing loss and his and Miranda's sex life has once again cooled. Miranda has an affair with comedian Che Diaz and ends things with Steve, leaving him heartbroken and confused. Steve finally moved on and opened his own place in Coney Island. Steve and Miranda find a mature and amicable solution to their relationship and become close friends and supportive parents.

==== Robert Leeds ====
Dr. Robert Leeds (Blair Underwood) is a sports medicine doctor who moves into Miranda's building during season six. He is the seemingly perfect man: successful, sexy, attentive to Brady, and utterly devoted to her. Robert and Miranda have fun and great chemistry, but when the time comes she is unable to declare her love for him, in part because she still loves Steve. Since he still lived in the same building as Miranda, she and Steve moved to Brooklyn.

==== Che Diaz ====
Che Diaz (Sara Ramirez) is introduced in And Just Like That. Che is a Mexican-Irish-American non-binary comedian who hosts a sex and relationship podcast, which Carrie appears on. Subsequently, the two begin a relationship. In the second series, their semibiographical TV series "Che Pasa" is greenlit and begins filming in Los Angeles.

== Recurring characters ==
=== Stanford Blatch ===
Stanford Blatch (Willie Garson), often referred to as the show's "Fifth Lady," is Carrie's best friend outside of the three women. A gay talent agent from an aristocratic family with a sense of style paralleled only by Carrie's, viewers receive the impression that they have a long-standing relationship built within their younger, wilder days in the New York City club and bar scene in the 1980s. He had said that they have been friends since Carrie was riding the subways and wearing Candie's. The only supporting character to receive his own storylines on occasion, Stanford represents the show's most constant gay point of view to sex on the show, generally based around the physical insecurities and inadequacies of someone who does not "have that gay look." In the last two seasons of the show, he is partnered with Broadway dancer Marcus Adente (Sean Palmer). We are led to believe this relationship does not last, however, as in the film he arrives at a New Year's party alone and has no one else to kiss except long-time rival Anthony Marentino, whom he weds in the sequel. In And Just Like That..., he divorces his husband to go to Japan to manage a TikTok account. In season two, it's revealed that Stanford became a Shinto priest.

=== Anthony Marentino ===
Anthony Marentino (Mario Cantone) is a Sicilian-American gay event planner who becomes close to Charlotte after styling her first wedding — he goes on to style Charlotte's H&G photo shoot, her second wedding and Carrie's book release party. He is not self-effacing like Stanford and freely doles out blunt, sometimes bawdy, advice to Charlotte. (For instance: Upon hearing that she hadn't had sex since her divorce, he exclaims: "If you don't put something 'in there' soon, it'll grow over!"). In Season 4, Episode 2, Charlotte tries to set up Anthony and Stanford. Anthony snubs Stanford, which results in resentment and competition ensues for the entire show run. However, in the first film, the two are seen kissing at a New Year's Eve party, and then get married in the sequel, with Anthony proclaiming at their wedding that Stanford is "the first man to accept me for the man that I actually am." He has a starring role on And Just Like That.

=== Magda ===
Magda (Lynn Cohen), the Ukrainian housekeeper/nanny who was introduced in the third season, becomes an ersatz mother figure and a thorn in Miranda's side. Her attempts to push traditional marriage/motherhood attitudes on Miranda are both subtle (buying her a rolling pin "To make pies. It's good for a woman to make pies.") and intrusive (replacing her vibrator with a statuette of The Virgin Mary). She is friendly to Steve even before he and Miranda are back together, and adores Brady to the point of making a collage of his pictures. Magda comes to accept Miranda's lifestyle choices and continues working for Miranda, even when she and Steve move to Brooklyn. Although Miranda is reluctant to accept help, Magda makes life manageable for Miranda after the birth of Brady by serving as both a housekeeper and a nanny.

=== Bitsy von Muffling ===
During the last episode of Season 5, the girls meet aging socialite Bitsy von Muffling (Julie Halston) right before and during her Hamptons wedding to flamboyant, and presumably gay, cabaret entertainer Bobby Fine (Nathan Lane). We see her again in the middle of Season 6 pregnant with Bobby's baby. She advises Charlotte, who's also had trouble becoming pregnant, to try acupuncture like she did. In the movie, we do see a brief reappearance of Bitsy, seated halfway down the table (right next to Stanford) during the dinner party. She returns in And Just Like That to console Carrie, who is newly widowed. It's implied that Bobby has died, and Bitsy confirms that her husband was in fact gay but that she still loved him and misses him. In Season 2, Bitsy later confirmed to Carrie that Bobby was the best sex of her life, due to him trying harder to please her sexually than heterosexual men, due to his closet homosexuality.

=== Seema Patel ===
Seema Patel (Sarita Choudhury) is a realtor whom Carrie hires to sell her apartment, after which the two become friends. Toward the end of And Just Like That... season 1, she is in a relationship with Zed.

=== The Wexleys ===
Lisa and Herbert Wexley are a socially prominent African-American couple. Charlotte meets them as their children attend the same school.

=== Nya Wallace ===
Dr. Nya Wallace (Karen Pittman) is a smart and accomplished Columbia Law School professor, she serves as a close friend and confidant to Miranda.

=== Cameos ===
As Sex and the City gained popularity, a number of celebrities had cameo appearances on the show, some playing themselves and some playing characters. These include the following:

- La La Anthony as herself in "The Post-it Always Sticks Twice"
- Will Arnett as Jack in "La Douleur Exquise!"
- Kevyn Aucoin as himself in "The Real Me"
- Candice Bergen as Enid Mead / Enid Frick in "A 'Vogue' Idea", "Plus One is the Loneliest Number" and "Splat!"
- Jon Bon Jovi as Seth in "Games People Play"
- Carole Bouquet as Juliette in "An American Girl in Paris, Part Deux"
- Bobby Cannavale as Adam Ball in "Easy Come, Easy Go"
- Cécile Cassel as Chloe in "An American Girl in Paris, Part Une"
- Margaret Cho as Lynn Cameron in "The Real Me"
- Jennifer Coolidge as Victoria in "The Perfect Present"
- Bradley Cooper as Jake in "They Shoot Single People Don't They?"
- Alan Cumming as "O" in "The Real Me"
- Miley Cyrus as herself in Sex and the City 2
- Kat Dennings as Jenny Brier in "Hot Child in the City"
- Murray Bartlett as Oliver Spencer in "All That Glitters"
- Anthony DeSando as Siddhartha in "The Drought"
- David Duchovny as Jeremy in "Boy, Interrupted"
- Carrie Fisher as herself in "Sex and Another City"
- Dan Futterman as Stephan in "Evolution"
- Sarah Michelle Gellar as Debbie in "Escape from New York"
- Heather Graham as herself in "Critical Condition"
- Tony Hale as "Tiger" in "The Real Me"
- Geri Halliwell as Phoebe in "Boy, Interrupted"
- Hugh Hefner as himself in "Sex and Another City"
- Kristen Johnston as Lexi Featherstone in "Splat!"
- Michael Patrick King as Mental Patient in "Boy, Interrupted"
- Heidi Klum as herself in "The Real Me"
- Ed Koch as himself in "The Real Me"
- Lady Bunny as herself in "Boy, Interrupted"
- Nathan Lane as Bobby Fine in "I Love a Charade"
- Lucy Liu as herself in "Coulda, Woulda, Shoulda"
- Gabriel Macht as Barkley in "Models and Mortals"
- Matthew McConaughey as himself in "Escape from New York"
- Liza Minnelli as herself in Sex and the City 2
- Isaac Mizrahi as himself in "Plus One is the Loneliest Number"
- Alanis Morissette as Dawn in "Boy, Girl, Boy, Girl..."
- Matthew Morrison as Young Busboy in "They Shoot Single People, Don't They?"
- Kelli O'Hara as Wedding Guest in Sex and the City 2
- Timothy Olyphant as Sam in "Valley of the Twenty-Something Guys"
- Tatum O'Neal as Kyra in "A Woman's Right to Shoes"
- Carrie Preston as Madeline Dunn in "The Chicken Dance"
- Ron Rifkin as Julian in "A 'Vogue' Idea"
- Amy Sedaris as Courteney Masterson in "Unoriginal Sin", "Cover Girl", "Plus One is the Loneliest Number" and "Pick-a-Little, Talk-a-Little".
- Molly Shannon as Lily Martin in "Unoriginal Sin", "Cover Girl", and "The Big Journey"
- Wallace Shawn as Martin Grable in "Splat!"
- Michael Showalter as Billy in "The Post-it Always Sticks Twice"
- John Slattery as Bill Kelley in "Where There's Smoke..." and "Politically Erect"
- Julia Sweeney as Nun in "Catch-38"
- Chris Tardio as Matt in "Boy, Girl, Boy, Girl..."
- Justin Theroux as Jared in "The Monogamists" and Vaughn Wysel in "Shortcomings"
- Donald Trump as himself in "The Man, The Myth, The Viagra"
- Tamara Tunie as Eileen in "The Cheating Curve"
- Vince Vaughn as Keith Travers in "Sex and Another City"
- Chandra Wilson as Police Officer in "Anchors Away"
