= Sex and the City (film) =

2008 film by Michael Patrick King

- Theatrical release poster
- Directed by: Michael Patrick King
- Written by: Michael Patrick King
- Based on: Sex and the City by Candace Bushnell; Sex and the City by Darren Star
- Produced by: Sarah Jessica Parker; Michael Patrick King; Darren Star; John Melfi
- Starring: Sarah Jessica Parker; Kim Cattrall; Kristin Davis; Cynthia Nixon; Jennifer Hudson; Candice Bergen; Chris Noth
- Cinematography: John Thomas
- Edited by: Michael Berenbaum
- Music by: Aaron Zigman
- Production companies: New Line Cinema; Home Box Office; Darren Star Productions
- Distributed by: Warner Bros. Pictures
- Release dates: May 12, 2008 (Leicester Square); May 30, 2008 (United States)
- Running time: 145 minutes
- Country: United States
- Language: English
- Budget: $65 million
- Box office: $418.8 million

Sex and the City (marketed as Sex and the City: The Movie) is a 2008 American romantic comedy film written and directed by Michael Patrick King in his feature film directorial debut. It serves as a continuation of the HBO television series Sex and the City (1998–2004), and follows the lives of four close friends—Carrie Bradshaw (Sarah Jessica Parker), Samantha Jones (Kim Cattrall), Charlotte York Goldenblatt (Kristin Davis), and Miranda Hobbes (Cynthia Nixon)—as they navigate relationships, careers, and personal challenges in New York City.

The film had its world premiere at Leicester Square in London on May 15, 2008, and was released theatrically in the United States on May 30. Despite receiving mixed reviews from critics—many describing it as an extended episode of the series—it was a major commercial success, grossing $418.8 million worldwide against a $65 million budget. A sequel, Sex and the City 2, was released in 2010, followed by a revival series, And Just Like That..., which premiered in 2021.

== Plot ==
A few years after the events of the television series, Carrie Bradshaw and Mr. Big are in a committed relationship and preparing to move in together. They find an expensive penthouse in New York City, which Big buys for them both to live in. Concerned about her lack of legal rights if they separate, Carrie considers selling her apartment to contribute financially. Big proposes marriage, and Carrie accepts.

Carrie is invited by Vogue editor Enid to be featured in the magazine's bridal couture "Age Issue". She models several designer gowns and is especially drawn to a Vivienne Westwood dress, which is later gifted to her by the designer. The attention surrounding the dress leads Carrie to deviate from her original plan of a small, intimate wedding to a large, elaborate extravaganza. The scale of the event begins to cause anxiety for Big, who has been divorced twice.

Miranda Hobbes is struggling in her marriage to Steve. Their intimacy has declined due to work and parenting responsibilities. Steve admits to having an affair, and Miranda decides to leave him. At Carrie and Big's rehearsal dinner, Steve attempts to reconcile with Miranda, but still hurt and upset by his betrayal, she bitterly tells Big that marriage ruins everything. On the day of the wedding, Big experiences doubts and calls Carrie to cancel. Carrie, heartbroken, leaves the venue. When Big tries to speak to her outside, she hits him with her bouquet.

Miranda admits to Charlotte York that she may have upset Big, but Charlotte dissuades her from telling Carrie, as Big has always had doubts about marriage. Carrie travels to Mexico with Miranda, Charlotte, and Samantha Jones on what was meant to be her honeymoon to recover from her heartbreak. Upon returning to New York, Carrie hires an assistant, Louise, to help her reorganize her life. Louise eventually reconciles with her ex-boyfriend and moves back to St. Louis to marry him.

Charlotte, who previously faced fertility challenges, learns that she is pregnant. Miranda confesses to Carrie that she made a discouraging remark about marriage to Big the night before the wedding. Carrie is angered and blames her for influencing Big's decision. Miranda later apologizes, and Carrie forgives her. Carrie encourages her to consider forgiving Steve, and the couple attends counseling and reconciles.

Samantha is living in Los Angeles with Smith, whose acting career is thriving. She becomes increasingly dissatisfied with the dwindling sex in their relationship, especially as she finds herself attracted to her neighbour, Dante. Rather than cheat on Smith, who supported her through her battle with breast cancer, she turns to comfort eating. Eventually, recognizing her unhappiness, she breaks up with Smith and moves back to New York.

A heavily pregnant Charlotte runs into Big at a restaurant, and the encounter causes her water to break. Big takes her to the hospital and waits nearby in hopes of speaking with Carrie. Harry informs Carrie that Big had sent her numerous emails, which she discovers were stored by Louise. The messages include famous love letters and an original note apologizing and expressing his love.

Carrie goes to the penthouse to retrieve a pair of shoes and finds Big there. They reconcile and get married at New York City Hall in the simple original dress suit she had intended to wear before being gifted the Westwood gown. Miranda, Charlotte, and Samantha arrive to celebrate with them, having been invited by Big. The four friends later raise a toast to Samantha's 50th birthday and the years ahead.

== Cast ==
- Sarah Jessica Parker as Carrie Bradshaw
- Kim Cattrall as Samantha Jones
- Kristin Davis as Charlotte York Goldenblatt
- Cynthia Nixon as Miranda Hobbes
- Chris Noth as John James "Mr. Big" Preston
- Candice Bergen as Enid Frick
- Jennifer Hudson as Louise, Carrie's assistant
- David Eigenberg as Steve Brady
- Evan Handler as Harry Goldenblatt
- Jason Lewis as Jerry "Smith" Jerrod
- Mario Cantone as Anthony Marentino
- Lynn Cohen as Magda
- Willie Garson as Stanford Blatch
- Joseph Pupo as Brady Hobbes, Miranda and Steve's son
- Alexandra and Parker Fong as Lily Goldenblatt, Charlotte and Harry's adoptive daughter
- Ching Valdes-Aran as real estate agent
- Daphne Rubin-Vega as baby-voiced girl
- André Leon Talley as Vogue magazine executive
- Gilles Marini as Dante
- Monica Mayhem as Dante's lover #1
- Veanne Cox as Halloween woman #1
- Annaleigh Ashford as spoiled label queen
- Bridget Everett as drunk party girl
- Joshua Henry as Will
- Kim Shaw as Valentine's Day waitress
- Philipp Christopher as married man (uncredited)
- Julie Halston as Bitsy von Muffling (uncredited)
- Ben Rindner as the waiter (uncredited)
- Joanna Gleason the therapist

== Production ==
=== Development ===
Following the successful conclusion of Sex and the City in 2004, discussions began about a potential film continuation. HBO confirmed that Michael Patrick King was developing a script and was slated to direct the project. However, later that year, Kim Cattrall declined to participate, citing delays in the script development and an uncertain production schedule, leading her to pursue other opportunities. As a result, early plans for a feature film were shelved.

In mid-2007, development resumed after Cattrall agreed to return, reportedly under the condition of additional contractual terms, including prospects for a future HBO project. In May 2007, the project was temporarily halted again when HBO indicated it could no longer finance the film independently. The proposal was circulated within Time Warner subsidiaries and was ultimately taken up by New Line Cinema.

=== Filming ===
Principal photography took place in New York City between September and December 2007. Filming occurred at various locations across Manhattan, with additional scenes shot at Steiner Studios and Silvercup Studios. Production frequently faced disruptions from paparazzi and onlookers, necessitating the presence of police and private security to manage crowds.

To preserve secrecy around the storyline, the filmmakers employed several strategies, including shooting multiple alternate endings. Scenes filmed in public or with large numbers of extras were described by Ryan Jonathan Healy and members of the main cast as “dream sequences” to mislead onlookers and prevent spoilers. The film also featured cameo appearances from Broadway performers, including Daphne Rubin-Vega, Joanna Gleason, and Annaleigh Ashford.

=== Costumes ===
As with the original television series, fashion played a central role in the production and storytelling of the film. Over 300 individual outfits were used throughout the film. Costume designer Patricia Field, who was responsible for the styling of the series, returned to oversee costume design for the film. Field initially expressed hesitation in joining the project due to both creative and financial concerns.

For the film, Field opted not to follow current fashion trends, instead choosing to reflect the individual growth and personality evolution of each character since the end of the series. Samantha's wardrobe was influenced by the glamorous aesthetics of American television series Dynasty, while Charlotte's style drew inspiration from Jackie Kennedy. Miranda's fashion transformation was considered the most significant, which Field attributed in part to the personal evolution of actress Cynthia Nixon.

Carrie's wedding dress was designed by Vivienne Westwood. The tutu that Carrie models for the other characters in one scene is the same as the iconic outfit worn in the opening credits of the television series. Carrie's assistant, Louise, is shown renting designer handbags from Bag Borrow or Steal. Hats featured in Vivienne Westwood ensembles were created by Prudence Millinery. Jewelry for the film was provided by H. Stern, which lent over 300 pieces. Additional costume selections were drawn from collections by haute couture designer Gilles Montezin.

== Music ==
=== Soundtrack ===
The official soundtrack for Sex and the City was released by New Line Records on May 27, 2008. It features a selection of pop, R&B, and contemporary tracks, including new recordings by Fergie and Jennifer Hudson, the latter of whom appears in the film as Carrie's assistant.

The soundtrack debuted at number two on the US Billboard 200 chart, marking the highest debut for a multi-artist theatrical film soundtrack since Get Rich or Die Tryin' (2005). In the United Kingdom, it entered the UK Albums Chart at number six and has sold over 55,000 copies to date.

A second compilation, Sex and the City: Volume 2, was released on September 23, 2008, to coincide with the film's DVD release. It includes tracks by British artists such as Estelle, Craig David, Mutya Buena, and Amy Winehouse, as well as American performers including Janet Jackson, Ciara, and Elijah Kelley.

=== Scores ===
In December 2008, an orchestral score album titled Sex and the City – The Score was released, featuring 18 tracks composed, co-orchestrated, and conducted by Aaron Zigman. While the track order on the album does not match the sequence in which the music appears in the film, the release includes nearly the entire score used throughout the film.

== Release ==
=== Premiere ===
The international premiere of Sex and the City took place on May 12, 2008, at the Odeon Luxe West End in London's Leicester Square, attended by an audience of approximately 1,700 people. The film then premiered in Berlin at the Sony Center in Potsdamer Platz on May 15, 2008. The New York City premiere was held at Radio City Music Hall on May 27, 2008.

== Reception ==
=== Box office ===
Sex and the City emerged as a commercial success. Opening in 3,285 theaters in the United States and Canada, the film earned $26.9 million on its first day. It went on to gross $57 million in its opening weekend, averaging $17,363 per theater. The film set records for the biggest opening weekend for both an R-rated comedy and a romantic comedy, surpassing American Pie 2 and Hitch, as well as for a film featuring an all-female leading cast. It also recorded the fifth-highest opening weekend for an R-rated film at the time, following The Matrix Reloaded, The Passion of the Christ, 300, and Hannibal.

As of March 2010, the film had grossed $152.6 million in the United States and Canada, and $262.6 million internationally, for a worldwide total of $415.2 million. It was the highest-grossing romantic comedy of 2008.

=== Critical response ===
Sex and the City received mixed reviews from critics. On Rotten Tomatoes, the film has a rating of 50%, based on 181 reviews, with an average score of 5.70/10. The site's critical consensus reads, "Sex and the City loses steam in the transition to the big screen, but will still thrill fans of the show." Metacritic gave the film a normalized average score of 53 out of 100, based on 38 critics, indicating "mixed or average reviews".

Brian Lowry of Variety said the film "...feels a trifle half-hearted", while Carina Chocano of the Los Angeles Times stated "the film tackles weighty issues with grace but is still very funny". She praised Michael Patrick King's work saying very few films "are willing to go to such dark places while remaining a comedy in the Shakespearean sense". Colin Bertram of the New York Daily News dubbed the film a "great reunion", and was happy with the return of "The 'Oh, my God, they did not just do that!' moments, the nudity, the swearing, the unabashed love of human frailty and downright wackiness". The Chicago Tribune's Jessica Reeves described it as "Witty, effervescent and unexpectedly thoughtful." Michael Rechtshaffen at The Hollywood Reporter praised the performances of the four leading ladies and said the film kept the essence of the series, but resembled a super-sized episode.

Manohla Dargis of The New York Times found the film "a vulgar, shrill, deeply shallow—and, at 2 hours and 22 turgid minutes, overlong—addendum to a show", while The Daily Telegraph's Sukhdev Sandhu panned the film saying "the ladies have become frozen, Spice Girls-style types–angsty, neurotic, predatory, princess–rather than individuals who might evolve or surprise us". Rick Groen of The Globe and Mail slammed the film commenting on lack of script and adding that the characters "don't perform so much as parade, fixed in their roles as semi-animated clothes hangers on a cinematic runway". He gave the film zero stars out of four. Anthony Lane, a film critic for The New Yorker, called the film a "superannuated fantasy posing as a slice of modern life"; he noted that "almost sixty years after All About Eve, which also featured four major female roles, there is a deep sadness in the sight of Carrie and friends defining themselves not as Bette Davis, Anne Baxter, Celeste Holm, and Thelma Ritter did—by their talents, their hats, and the swordplay of their wits—but purely by their ability to snare and keep a man....All the film lacks is a subtitle: "The Lying, the Bitch, and the Wardrobe."

Ramin Setoodeh of Newsweek speculated that some of the criticism for the film is derived possibly from sexism: "when you listen to men talk about it (and this is coming from the perspective of a male writer), a strange thing happens. The talk turns hateful. Angry. Vengeful. Annoyed...Is this just poor sportsmanship? I can't help but wonder—cue the Carrie Bradshaw voiceover here—if it's not a case of 'Sexism in the City.' Men hated the movie before it even opened...Movie critics, an overwhelmingly male demographic, gave it such a nasty tongue lashing you would have thought they were talking about an ex-girlfriend...The movie might not be Citizen Kane—which, for the record, is a dude flick—but it's incredibly sweet and touching."

The film featured on worst of 2008 lists including that of The Times, Mark Kermode, The New York Observer, the NME, and The Daily Telegraph.

=== Accolades ===
Award	Date of the ceremony	Category	Recipient(s)	Result	Ref.
Golden Trailer Awards	May 8, 2008	Best Summer 2008 Blockbuster Poster	The Ant Farm	Nominated	
MTV Movie Awards	June 1, 2008	Best Summer Movie So Far	Sex and the City	Nominated	
Teen Choice Awards	August 4, 2008	Choice Movie – Chick Flick	Sex and the City	Nominated	
Teen Choice Awards	August 4, 2008	Choice Movie – Comedy Actress	Sarah Jessica Parker	Nominated	
National Movie Awards	September 8, 2008	Best Comedy	Sex and the City	Nominated	
National Movie Awards	September 8, 2008	Best Female Performance	Sarah Jessica Parker	Nominated	
Satellite Awards	December 14, 2008	Best Costume Design	Patricia Field	Nominated	
People's Choice Awards	January 7, 2009	Favorite Cast	Sarah Jessica Parker, Kim Cattrall, Kristin Davis, Cynthia Nixon, and Chris Noth	Nominated	
People's Choice Awards	January 7, 2009	Favorite Song from a Soundtrack	"Labels or Love" by Fergie	Nominated	
Costume Designers Guild Awards	February 17, 2009	Excellence in Contemporary Film	Patricia Field	Nominated	
BMI Film & Television Music Awards	May 20, 2009	BMI Film Music Award	Aaron Zigman	Won	

== Media releases ==
Sex and the City: The Movie was released on DVD and Blu-ray by New Line Home Entertainment (distributed by Warner Home Video) on September 23, 2008. Two versions of the film were released in the United States. The standard single-disc edition featured the theatrical cut in either fullscreen or widescreen formats, and included audio commentary, deleted scenes, and a digital copy of the film.

A two-disc special edition was released simultaneously, featuring an extended cut with six additional minutes of footage. It also included the commentary from the standard edition and a second disc containing bonus features, along with a digital copy of the theatrical version. The Blu-ray release mirrored the two-disc extended edition in both content and features.

In December 2008, a third edition titled Sex and the City: The Movie – The Wedding Collection was released. This four-disc set included the extended cut of the film, additional bonus features, a music CD featuring songs inspired by the film—including an alternate mix of Fergie’s “Labels or Love”—and a hardcover photo book with quotes. It also came packaged in a pink padded box with a numbered certificate of authenticity.

A fourth version, exclusive to Australia, included the two-disc special edition and a Sex and the City-inspired black clutch bag with a faux snakeskin design.

In the United States, the DVD sold 3.55 million copies in 2008, generating revenue of over $72.4 million. In the United Kingdom, it became the fastest-selling DVD release of 2008, reaching number one on the UK DVD Chart and selling over 920,000 copies in its first week—surpassing Ratatouille (2007) which had sold 700,000 copies and held the previous record. This record was later surpassed by Mamma Mia!.

== Sequel ==
A sequel, Sex and the City 2, was released in theaters on May 27, 2010, in the United States and May 28, 2010, in the United Kingdom. The film was co-written, produced, and directed by Michael Patrick King. Sarah Jessica Parker, Kim Cattrall, Kristin Davis, Cynthia Nixon, and Chris Noth reprised their roles from the original film and the television series. The cast also included cameo appearances by Liza Minnelli, Miley Cyrus, Tim Gunn, Ron White, Omid Djalili, and Penélope Cruz, as well as Broadway performers Norm Lewis, Kelli O'Hara, and Ryan Silverman. The DVD was released in the United Kingdom on November 29, 2010.

In December 2016, a third installment was announced, but in September 2017, Parker confirmed that the project had been cancelled. The proposed third film was later reimagined as a revival series, And Just Like That..., which premiered in 2021 on HBO Max. Cattrall did not return for the series.
