= Sex and the City 2 =

2010 film by Michael Patrick King

- Theatrical release poster
- Directed by: Michael Patrick King
- Written by: Michael Patrick King
- Based on: Characters by Candace Bushnell Sex and the City by Darren Star
- Produced by: Michael Patrick King; Sarah Jessica Parker; Darren Star; John Melfi
- Starring: Sarah Jessica Parker; Kim Cattrall; Kristin Davis; Cynthia Nixon; John Corbett; Chris Noth
- Cinematography: John Thomas
- Edited by: Michael Berenbaum
- Music by: Aaron Zigman
- Production companies: New Line Cinema; HBO Films; Village Roadshow Pictures; Darren Star Productions
- Distributed by: Warner Bros. Pictures
- Release date: May 27, 2010 (United States)
- Running time: 146 minutes
- Country: United States
- Language: English
- Budget: $95 million
- Box office: $294.7 million

Sex and the City 2 is a 2010 American romantic comedy film, written and directed by Michael Patrick King. It is the second and final film to be based on the HBO television series—serving as a sequel to 2008's Sex and the City. The film stars Sarah Jessica Parker, Kim Cattrall, Kristin Davis, Cynthia Nixon, John Corbett and Chris Noth.

Sex and the City 2 was released theatrically in the United States on May 27, 2010, and received highly unfavorable reviews from critics, who criticized the plot and runtime, as well as the "culturally insensitive" portrayal of the Middle East. Regardless, the film was commercially successful, grossing $294.7 million worldwide against its budget of $95 million.

A follow-up television series, And Just Like That..., premiered in 2021 on HBO Max, running for three seasons until 2025.

== Plot ==
Carrie, Samantha, Charlotte, and Miranda reunite to attend the wedding of their friends Stanford and Anthony. Three of the four women are now married, with Samantha remaining single at 52 and managing the effects of menopause while trying to maintain her libido.

In New York City, Miranda becomes increasingly frustrated at her law firm and ultimately resigns after repeated disrespect from the new managing partner. Charlotte, now a stay-at-home mother to daughters Lily and Rose, feels overwhelmed by parenting and grows concerned that her husband, Harry, may be attracted to their young Irish nanny, Erin. Carrie and Mr. Big have settled into married life but differ on how to spend their leisure time. Carrie enjoys socializing and going out, while Big prefers staying in and watching television.

For their anniversary, Carrie gives Big a vintage engraved Rolex. In return, he installs a television in their bedroom, suggesting they watch old movies together, which Carrie interprets as impersonal. Feeling unappreciated, Carrie temporarily moves back to her old apartment to write. Upon her return, Big acts more attentive and suggests she spend two days a week at her old apartment so he can unwind, which he believes will allow them to better enjoy their time together. Carrie agrees, though she fears the arrangement may create distance.

Samantha is hired to develop a PR campaign for a wealthy Arab sheikh. As part of the deal, he invites her and her friends on an all-expenses-paid luxury vacation to Abu Dhabi. Miranda, no longer tied to a job, is particularly enthusiastic about the trip.

Upon arrival, Samantha's hormone supplements are confiscated due to local laws, which affects her libido. Charlotte, anxious about her marriage, struggles with being away from her children and frequently calls home. Miranda embraces the new cultural environment, and Carrie befriends Gaurau, her hotel's butler, who is an underpaid temporary worker from India. He warns her to be cautious of men trying to take advantage of tourists.

While exploring a local souq, Carrie unexpectedly runs into her former fiancé, Aidan. They agree to meet for dinner, during which they reconnect and reminisce. Their evening ends with a kiss, after which Carrie quickly leaves, conflicted. Back at the hotel, she discusses the incident with Miranda and Charlotte. She decides to tell Big, despite Samantha's advice to wait. Big reacts coolly and ends the call abruptly.

The women's Western habits increasingly clash with local customs. Samantha, in particular, causes controversy when she publicly displays affection toward a Danish architect she meets, leading to her arrest. The situation is resolved through the sheikh's intervention, but the group is asked to leave the country early to avoid further scandal.

Carrie returns to New York to find the bedroom television gone and Big absent. He later returns and presents her with a black diamond engagement ring, symbolizing her uniqueness. The two reconcile and agree to continue balancing their personal needs within their marriage.

Charlotte discovers that Erin is a lesbian, easing her earlier concerns. Miranda accepts a new position at a more inclusive and respectful law firm. Samantha remains true to herself, meeting the Danish architect again for a rendezvous in The Hamptons.

== Cast ==
- Sarah Jessica Parker as Carrie Bradshaw / Preston
- Kim Cattrall as Samantha Jones
- Kristin Davis as Charlotte York Goldenblatt
- Cynthia Nixon as Miranda Hobbes
- Chris Noth as John James "Mr. Big" Preston
- John Corbett as Aidan Shaw
- David Eigenberg as Steve Brady
- Evan Handler as Harry Goldenblatt
- Jason Lewis as Jerry "Smith" Jerrod
- Willie Garson as Stanford Blatch
- Mario Cantone as Anthony Marentino
- Lynn Cohen as Magda
- Alice Eve as Erin, Charlotte's Irish Nanny
- Noah Mills as Nicky Marentino
- Megan Boone as Allie
- Max Ryan as Rikard Spirt
- Raza Jaffrey as Gaurau
- Viola Harris as Gloria Blatch
- Omid Djalili as Mr. Safir, Hotel Manager
- Dhaffer L'Abidine as Mahmud
- Art Malik as Sheikh Khaled
- Penélope Cruz as Carmen García Carrión
- Andrew Rannells as Wedding Chorus
- Liza Minnelli as herself
- Miley Cyrus as herself
- Tuesday Knight as herself
- Tim Gunn as himself

== Production ==
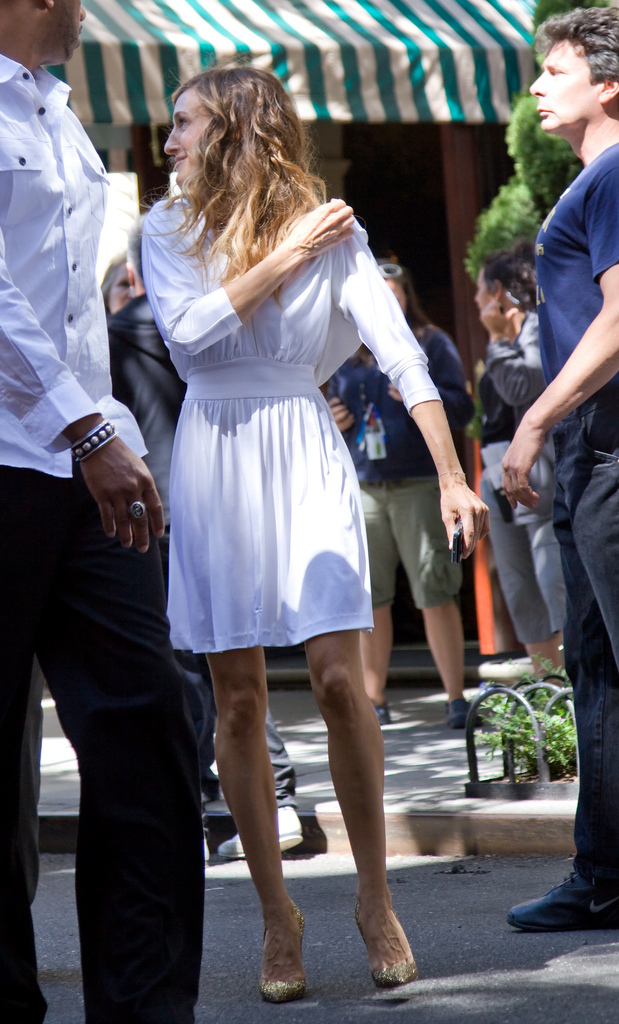
Sarah Jessica Parker on the set of the film

=== Development ===
The cast confirmed in February 2009 that a sequel to Sex and the City was in development. Filming officially began in August 2009.

Writer and director Michael Patrick King noted that the sequel would differ in tone and scope from the first film, incorporating more exotic locations and larger-scale escapism. He attributed this change to his experiences promoting the original film in international markets and to a desire to create a story offering fantasy and glamour during the global recession—citing the escapist comedies of the 1930s as an influence. Abu Dhabi was selected as a central location due to its reputation for high fashion and relative economic resilience during the recession. However, filming permission in the United Arab Emirates was ultimately denied.

All four lead actresses—Sarah Jessica Parker, Cynthia Nixon, Kristin Davis, and Kim Cattrall—returned for the sequel, along with Chris Noth as Mr. Big. Several supporting cast members from the series and first film also reprised their roles, including Evan Handler as Harry Goldenblatt, David Eigenberg as Steve Brady, John Corbett as Aidan Shaw, Willie Garson as Stanford Blatch, and Mario Cantone as Anthony Marentino. King returned as writer and director, and Patricia Field again oversaw costume design, with hats by Prudence Millinery for Vivienne Westwood.

Entertainment Weekly reported the production budget as $95 million—$30 million more than the first film—with Sarah Jessica Parker receiving $15 million plus residuals for her dual role as producer and lead actress.

=== Filming ===
Filming in New York City was delayed until late July 2009 due to the denial of filming permits by Emirati authorities. As a result, the Abu Dhabi scenes were instead shot in Morocco. Principal photography began on September 1, 2009, and continued through the end of the year.

The Moroccan shoot took place in various locations, including the seaside town of Sidi Kaouki. Originally planned for 13 days, the shoot extended to nearly six weeks. All four main actresses, along with other cast and crew members, were photographed on location in November 2009.

=== Casting ===
In September 2009, Liza Minnelli confirmed her cameo appearance in the film. While Bette Midler was photographed on set, she does not appear in the final cut. Penélope Cruz appears briefly in a scene as Carmen, a banker. Miley Cyrus also appears in a cameo, sharing a red carpet scene with Samantha while wearing the same outfit. Photos from the shoot were published online in October 2009.

John Corbett, who portrayed Aidan Shaw in the television series, was photographed on location in Morocco, confirming his return in the sequel.

== Release ==
Promotional efforts for Sex and the City 2 began in December 2009 with the release of the official teaser poster, which featured Carrie Bradshaw in a white dress and gold sunglasses reflecting a Moroccan backdrop. The poster included the tagline "Carrie On", echoing the wordplay of "Get Carried Away" used in the marketing campaign for the first film. The same imagery and tagline were incorporated into the official website, which launched simultaneously.

The teaser trailer was released online on December 22, 2009. In March 2010, Sarah Jessica Parker, Cynthia Nixon, and Kristin Davis attended ShoWest 2010 in Las Vegas to debut the full-length trailer and participate in a promotional discussion about the film. Kim Cattrall, who was performing on stage in London's West End at the time, joined the promotional campaign after her run concluded on May 3.

The full theatrical trailer premiered on Entertainment Tonight and online on April 8, 2010. It featured Jay-Z and Alicia Keys' "Empire State of Mind" and "Can't Touch It" by Australian singer Ricki-Lee Coulter.

A global promotional tour featuring the main cast began in early May 2010 and continued through the film's release. The campaign included press conferences, television appearances, and international events in multiple cities. The official New York City premiere was held on May 24, 2010.

== Reception ==
=== Box office ===
Sex and the City 2 was released in 3,445 theaters across North America on May 27, 2010, marking one of the widest openings for an R-rated romantic comedy. It earned $3 million from its midnight screenings in 2,000 locations. On its opening day, the film grossed $14.2 million, initially projecting a $60 million four-day total and up to $75 million across the five-day Memorial Day weekend. Ultimately, the film debuted in second place behind Shrek Forever After, earning $31 million over the traditional three-day weekend and $45.2 million over four days. Its five-day Memorial Day total reached $51 million.

Internationally, the film topped box office charts in several major markets, including Germany for five consecutive weeks, the United Kingdom for three weeks, and Australia for two weeks. It also surpassed the performance of the original film in territories such as Japan and Greece. In multiple markets, the sequel sold more tickets than its predecessor.

As of August 19, 2010, the film had grossed $95.3 million in the United States and Canada, with an additional $199.3 million from international markets, bringing its worldwide total to $294.7 million.[4] Although this was approximately 27% lower than the global earnings of the first film, Sex and the City 2 was the highest-grossing romantic comedy of 2010.

=== Critical response ===
Sex and the City 2 was critically panned. On the review aggregator Rotten Tomatoes, Sex and the City 2 holds an approval rating of 16% based on 217 reviews, with an average rating of 3.9/10. In comparison, the first film scored 49% based on 183 reviews, with an average rating of 5.7/10. The critical consensus reads: "Straining under a thin plot stretched to its limit by a bloated running time, Sex and the City 2 adds an unfortunate coda to the long-running HBO series." On Metacritic, the film has a weighted average score of 27 out of 100 based on 39 critics, indicating "generally unfavorable reviews".

The film faced widespread criticism, particularly for its depiction of Middle Eastern culture. Stephen Farber of The Hollywood Reporter described the film as "blatantly anti-Muslim", while Hadley Freeman of The Guardian called the trailers "borderline racist". Andrew O'Hagan of the Evening Standard wrote that the film "could be the most stupid, the most racist, the most polluting and women-hating film of the year." Roger Ebert awarded it one out of four stars, criticizing the characters as "flyweight bubbleheads", the narration as redundant, and the visual presentation as "arthritic".

Lindy West, writing for The Stranger, published a widely discussed review, stating that the film "takes everything that I hold dear as a woman and as a human... and rapes it to death with a stiletto that costs more than my car," further criticizing its excessive runtime and perceived lack of substance. British critic Mark Kermode also gave a strongly negative review, later naming it the worst film of 2010, stating he could think of nothing "more poisonous, more repugnant, more repulsive, more retrograde, more depressing than Sex and the City 2." Time included it in its list of the "10 Worst Movies Based on TV Shows".

== Accolades ==
Sex and the City 2 received seven nominations at the 31st Golden Raspberry Awards, including Worst Picture. It went on to win three awards, including a joint Worst Actress award for the four "gal pals" (Parker, Cattrall, Nixon, and Davis). David Eigenberg expressed interest in receiving the Worst Couple/Screen Ensemble Razzie, which was awarded to the entire cast. According to Razzies founder John J. B. Wilson, "[Eigenberg] said that he had never won an award of any kind and if this was what he won, he would accept it." Eigenberg then collaborated with Wilson to make a humorous acceptance video which was posted on the official YouTube channel of the Golden Raspberry Awards.

Award	Date of the ceremony	Category	Recipients	Result	Ref.
National Movie Awards	26 May 2010	Vue Most Anticipated Movie of the Summer	Sex and the City 2	Nominated	
Houston Film Critics Society	18 December 2010	Worst Picture	Sex and the City 2	Nominated	
Oklahoma Film Critics Circle	22 December 2010	Obviously Worst Film	Sex and the City 2	Won	
People's Choice Awards	5 January 2011	Favorite Comedy Movie	Sex and the City 2	Nominated	
Alliance of Women Film Journalists	10 January 2011	Hall Of Shame Award	Sex and the City 2	Won	
Alliance of Women Film Journalists	10 January 2011	Sequel That Shouldn't Have Been Made Award	Sex and the City 2	Won	
Alliance of Women Film Journalists	10 January 2011	Sexist Pig Award	Michael Patrick King	Nominated	
Golden Raspberry Awards	26 February 2011	Worst Picture	Sex and the City 2	Nominated	
Golden Raspberry Awards	26 February 2011	Worst Director	Michael Patrick King	Nominated	
Golden Raspberry Awards	26 February 2011	Worst Actress	Sarah Jessica Parker, Kim Cattrall, Kristin Davis, and Cynthia Nixon	Won	
Golden Raspberry Awards	26 February 2011	Worst Supporting Actress	Liza Minnelli	Nominated	
Golden Raspberry Awards	26 February 2011	Worst Screenplay	Michael Patrick King	Nominated	
Golden Raspberry Awards	26 February 2011	Worst Screen Combo	The entire cast of Sex and the City 2	Won	
Golden Raspberry Awards	26 February 2011	Worst Remake, Rip-off or Sequel	Sex and the City 2	Won	

== Soundtrack ==
Sex and the City 2: Original Motion Picture Soundtrack was released on May 25, 2010, by WaterTower Music. The album features songs from and inspired by the film.

The original score was composed by Aaron Zigman and performed by the Hollywood Studio Symphony. It was recorded and mixed by Dennis S. Sands and Steve Kempster. The score was orchestrated by Stephen Coleman, who also conducted, with additional orchestration by Patrick Kirst.

== Home media ==
Sex and the City 2 was released on DVD, Blu-ray, and iTunes on October 26, 2010, in the United States, where it debuted at number one on the home media sales chart, selling nearly one million copies in its first week. The film was released on DVD and Blu-ray in the United Kingdom on November 29, 2010, where it also debuted atop the sales chart.

== Post-release ==
=== Canceled sequel ===
In December 2016, Radar Online reported that a script for a third Sex and the City film had been approved. However, on September 28, 2017, Sarah Jessica Parker confirmed that the project would not move forward. She stated, "We had this beautiful, funny, heartbreaking, joyful, very relatable script and story. It's not just disappointing that we don't get to tell the story and have that experience, but more so for that audience that has been so vocal in wanting another movie."

Reports in 2018 indicated that Kim Cattrall declined to participate in the third film after learning that the proposed plot involved killing off Mr. Big and a storyline in which her character, Samantha, receives inappropriate messages from Miranda's teenage son, Brady. In a 2019 interview, Cattrall explained her decision not to return, saying she felt she had "gone past the finish line" with the character out of love for the franchise.

=== Follow-up television series ===
The storyline originally intended for the third film was later reworked into the television series And Just Like That..., which premiered on HBO Max on December 9, 2021. Cattrall did not return for the series, as previously agreed, though she made a brief cameo in the second-season finale. The series was renewed for a second season in March 2022, and a third season was announced in August 2023.
