= Sean Palmer =

American Actor

- Born: Sean Gregory Palmer; January 23, 1973 (age 53); Reno, Nevada, U.S.
- Occupations: Actor; singer; dancer
- Years active: 1995–present

Sean Gregory Palmer (born January 23, 1973) is an American stage and screen actor, singer, and dancer. Palmer's most recognizable role on television is that of Stanford Blatch's boyfriend, Marcus, on the HBO series Sex and the City.

== Career ==
Palmer played Prince Eric in the stage version of The Little Mermaid, which began on January 10, 2008.

Palmer can be heard on the Original Broadway Cast recording of The Little Mermaid and on the soundtrack of the motion picture Easy Virtue. In 2010, they appeared in a one-night only concert semi staged reading of Evening Primrose by Stephen Sondheim.

== Personal life ==
In October 2021, Palmer came out as non-binary, and stated their preference for they/them pronouns.

== Theatre credits ==
- The Secret Garden: (Denver Center Theatre Company 2017) Archibald Craven
- Guys and Dolls (Weston Playhouse Theatre Company 2015) Sky Masterson
- On The Town: (English National Opera 2007) Chip
- The Phantom of the Opera: (West End 2013) Raoul, Vicomte de Chagny
- Singin' in the Rain: (Drury Lane Theatre 2012) Don Lockwood
- Crazy For You: (Open Air Theatre, Regent's Park 2011) Bobby Child
- Joseph and the Amazing Technicolor Dreamcoat: (Casa Mañana 2010) Joseph
- The Little Mermaid: (Broadway 2007) Prince Eric
- The Apple Tree: (Broadway Revival 2006) Ensemble and Cover to Mr. Kudisch
- The Boy Friend: (National tour 2005) Tony Brockhurst; directed by Julie Andrews
- Kiss Me, Kate: (North Shore Music Theatre 2004) Bill Calhoun / Lucentio
- Saturday Night Fever : (Broadway 1999) Joey and later Tony Manero
- Fosse: (Broadway & National Tour 1998) Swing
- Dream: (Broadway 1997) Swing
- Carousel: (National Tour 1996) Enoch Snow

== Filmography ==
=== Film ===
Year	Title	Role	Notes
2002	Chicago	Male dancer	

=== Television ===
Year	Title	Role	Notes
2002–2004	Sex and the City	Marcus Adant	8 episodes
2003	The Reagans	Tony	Television film
2005	Grey's Anatomy	Intern / Intern #3	2 episodes

=== Video games ===
Year	Title	Role
2022	Kao the Kangaroo	Voice
