= Sex and the City =

American television series (1998–2004)

- Seasons 4–6 title card
- Genre: Romantic comedy; Comedy drama; Sex comedy
- Created by: Darren Star
- Based on: Sex and the City by Candace Bushnell
- Showrunners: Darren Star; Michael Patrick King
- Starring: Sarah Jessica Parker; Kim Cattrall; Kristin Davis; Cynthia Nixon
- Narrated by: Sarah Jessica Parker
- Theme music composer: Douglas J. Cuomo; Tom Findlay
- Opening theme: "Sex and the City Theme"
- Composers: Douglas J. Cuomo (1998–1999); Bob Christianson (2000–2004)
- Country of origin: United States
- Original language: English
- No. of seasons: 6
- No. of episodes: 94 (list of episodes)

Production
- Executive producers: Darren Star; Michael Patrick King; John P. Melfi; Jenny Bicks; Sarah Jessica Parker; Cindy Chupack
- Producers: Jane Raab; Antonia Ellis; Julie Rottenberg; Elisa Zuritsky
- Production location: New York City, New York
- Editors: Michael Berenbaum; Wendey Stanzler; Kate Sanford
- Camera setup: Single-camera
- Running time: 25 minutes (seasons 1–2); 30 minutes (seasons 3–6)
- Production companies: Darren Star Productions; HBO Entertainment

Original release
- Network: HBO
- Release: June 6, 1998 – February 22, 2004

Related
- The Carrie Diaries; And Just Like That...

Sex and the City is an American romantic comedy-drama television series created by Darren Star for HBO, based on the newspaper column and 1996 book by Candace Bushnell. It premiered in the United States on June 6, 1998, and concluded on February 22, 2004, with 94 episodes broadcast over six seasons.

The series follows the lives of four female friends living in New York City: the streetwise newspaper columnist Carrie Bradshaw (played by Sarah Jessica Parker), the sexually liberal PR professional Samantha Jones (Kim Cattrall), the more conservative art dealer Charlotte York (Kristin Davis) and the cynical lawyer Miranda Hobbes (Cynthia Nixon).

Sex and the City received both acclaim and criticism for its characters and themes, and is credited with helping to increase HBO's popularity. It won numerous accolades including seven Primetime Emmy Awards, eight Golden Globe Awards and three Screen Actors Guild Awards. The series was ranked fifth on Entertainment Weekly's "New TV Classics" list, and has been cited as one of the best television series of all time. It airs in syndication worldwide.

Sex and the City was followed by the feature films Sex and the City (2008) and Sex and the City 2 (2010), and a prequel television series commissioned by the CW, The Carrie Diaries (2013–14). A sequel series, And Just Like That..., premiered on HBO Max on December 9, 2021, without Cattrall.

== Development ==
The show is based on writer Candace Bushnell's column "Sex and the City" published in The New York Observer, which was later compiled into a book of the same name. Bushnell has said in several interviews that the Carrie Bradshaw in her columns is her alter ego; when she started the column she wrote from her first-person perspective, but later invented Carrie, who was introduced as Bushnell's friend, so her parents would not be aware that they were reading about her sex life. Bushnell and the television version of Carrie (who had no last name in the column) have the same initials, a flourish emphasizing their connection. Moreover, like Bushnell, Carrie writes columns for the fictional New York Star which are also compiled into a book later in the series, and later becomes a writer for Vogue.

Bushnell worked with television producer Darren Star, whom she had met while profiling him for Vogue, to adapt the columns for television. HBO and ABC were interested in the series, but Star decided to offer it to HBO for more creative freedom. Star wrote the pilot with Parker in mind as Carrie. According to Parker, "I was flattered but didn't want to do it. He convinced me, begged me to do it, and I signed a contract." The pilot episode was subsequently shot in June 1997, a year before the series premiered. However, Parker disliked the pilot, saying "I hated the look, the clothes ... I didn't think it worked" and feared it would end her career. She wanted to get out of the contract, offering to work in three HBO movies unpaid. Though Star would not release her, he listened to her concerns and implemented major changes before shooting the first season. Parker said: "The funny thing, after the first episode of season one, I never looked back and the rest is history. I never thought, though, that the show would become what it has become."

HBO scheduled the show on Sunday nights, a night that broadcast networks typically neglected, and used Sex and the City and The Sopranos to create the network's popular Sunday night lineup, which has consistently aired prestige dramas and comedies year-round.

== Cast and characters ==
=== Carrie Bradshaw ===
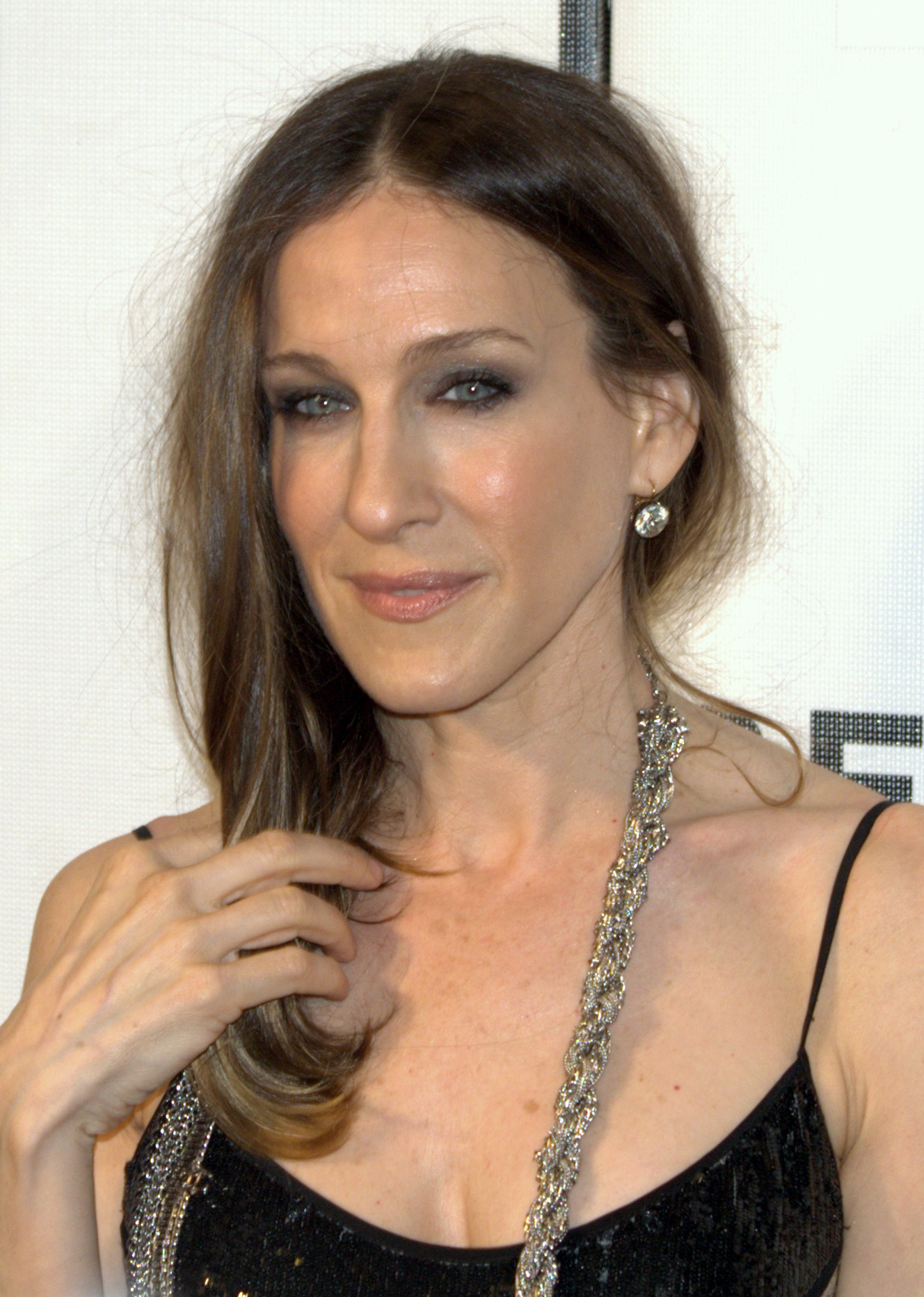
Columnist Carrie Bradshaw is played by Sarah Jessica Parker

Carrie Bradshaw (Sarah Jessica Parker) is the narrator and main protagonist, played by Sarah Jessica Parker, with each episode structured around her train of thought while writing her weekly column "Sex and the City" for the fictitious paper, the New York Star. A member of the New York glitterati, she is a club/bar/restaurant staple known for her unique fashion sense and lives in a studio apartment in an Upper East Side brownstone. Stanford Blatch, a gay talent agent from an aristocratic family (played by Willie Garson), is Carrie's best friend outside of the other three women.

Carrie is entangled with Mr. Big (Chris Noth), a prominent businessman, an aficionado of jazz and cigars, and a smooth-talking philanderer. Carrie and Big engage in a tumultuous, on-again, off-again relationship, and he is the reason for many of Carrie's breakdowns because he never seems ready to fully commit to her. He is once-divorced by the time the series opens. (In a running joke, whenever Carrie is about to introduce Mr. Big on-camera to another character, she is interrupted before she can say his name, which is John, revealed only in the final moments of the series’ final episode (Season 6, Episode 20).

Carrie and Big break up a second time in Season 2 when he leaves New York for a work trip to Paris for the summer and does not show willingness for Carrie to accompany him nor to continue a long-distance relationship, citing commitment issues. Carrie is heartbroken and some months later runs into Big at a party in The Hamptons. He is accompanied by his 20-something year-old girlfriend, Natasha, whom he met in Paris. Despite this, Carrie attempts to be friends with Big. However, this goes awry when he tells her that he and Natasha are getting married, something he'd never considered with Carrie.

In season 3, Carrie meets and is instantly attracted to up-and-coming Manhattan furniture designer Aidan Shaw (John Corbett) who becomes her boyfriend. Aidan is more traditional and patient about relationships than many of Carrie's other love interests, and for a while they are happy together. At a furniture show, the pair run into Natasha and Big, who confides to Carrie that he made a mistake marrying Natasha and wants out. Soon afterward, Big and Carrie begin an affair, which ends only when Natasha catches Carrie at Big's apartment and falls down the stairs while chasing after Carrie. Carrie ends up taking her to the hospital and breaks up with Big.

Wracked with guilt, Carrie tells Aidan of the affair on the day of Charlotte's wedding to Trey, and Aidan breaks up with her. Aidan and Carrie reunite in Season 4, when Aidan opens a bar with Miranda's ex, Steve. Carrie realizes she is still in love with Aidan and wins him back. He struggles to trust her, particularly as Mr. Big has gotten divorced from Natasha, and he and Carrie maintain a platonic friendship. Carrie stands firm on her friendship with Big, even inviting him up to Aidan's cabin after a girl had broken up with him. Though it's clear she and Aidan are very different people, they keep trying to meld their lives.

When Carrie's building goes co-op, Aidan offers to buy her apartment (and the one next door) so they can move in together. She agrees and later finds an engagement ring in his gym bag. Aidan later proposes, and Carrie accepts, though she's not sure it's the right thing.

Aidan is initially patient with Carrie's reluctance to set a wedding date but soon begins to push her, suggesting they get married in Hawaii. Carrie has a panic attack while trying on wedding dresses with Miranda, and again when Aidan is knocking down the wall between her apartment and the one next door. She confesses to Aidan that she's not ready and needs more time. He agrees to slow things down but, at a Black and White ball not long afterward, he pressures her to commit, making it clear that he still doesn't trust that she's over Big. Carrie cannot commit, and they break up soon afterward.

After their affair, over seasons four, five and six, Carrie and Big become real friends, and she thinks she's put her feelings for him in the past. But when Big comes to town in the final season to get "a little heart thing" done, she realizes she still has feelings for him. When Big has a medical hiccup, Carrie takes care of him, and suddenly Big's heart opens to her. It's short-lived however and Carrie decides she's finished with his inability to commit and finished with him.

The famous artist Aleksandr Petrovsky (Mikhail Baryshnikov) becomes Carrie's lover in the final season. Despite their age difference, he sweeps her off her feet with huge romantic gestures and shows her foreign pockets of New York she has never seen before.

Aleksandr invites Carrie to move to Paris with him for his work, which is doubly meaningful for Carrie, since it's a reminder of something Big wouldn't do. The rest of the women are not keen on Aleksandr, particularly Miranda, who feels that he is controlling, and that Carrie is different around him.

On the night before Carrie leaves, Mr. Big turns up at her home, apologizing for how he acted after his heart surgery, and clearly wanting to get closer. The two argue in the street with Carrie accusing him of turning up whenever she's happy to ruin things for her. She tells him she's moving to Paris and to leave her alone.

When Carrie arrives in Paris, she finds Aleksandr frequently absent with work on his art show. She is left to wander the streets of Paris alone day after day and begins to regret her decision. She calls Miranda and tells her that she's lonely because Alek is neglecting her, and that she's been thinking about Big.

Meanwhile, back in New York, Charlotte hears a message Mr. Big leaves Carrie on her answering machine admitting that he loves her. Charlotte invites Big to the coffee shop where he enlists the help of Carrie's friends, asking if they think he has a chance. Miranda, armed with the information from Carrie's call, simply says, "Go get our girl", and Big goes to Paris to win her back.

Carrie, having once again been abandoned by Aleksandr (having given up the opportunity to go to a party with some new friends to accompany him to a preview of his show), has it out with him in their hotel room. Aleksandr accidentally smacks Carrie in the face and breaks her diamond necklace.

As Carrie is in the lobby, trying to obtain a room for the night, Big walks in. They see each other, he tells her she's "the one" (something she's been waiting for their entire relationship), and he takes her home to New York.

=== Charlotte York ===
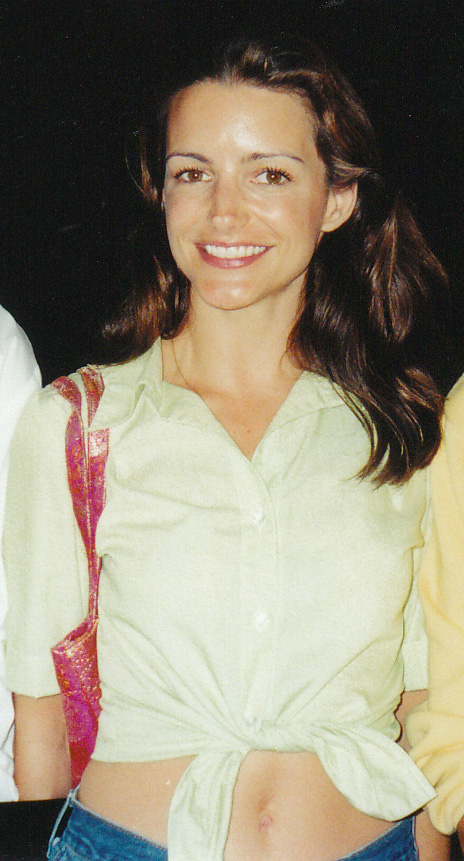
Art dealer and housewife Charlotte York Goldenblatt is played by Kristin Davis

Charlotte York (Kristin Davis) has had a conventional, privileged Episcopalian Connecticut upbringing and works in an art gallery. Charlotte is a classic over-achiever and perfectionist: a "straight A" student who attended Smith College, was a member of Kappa Kappa Gamma (there are no sororities at the real Smith College) majoring in art history with a minor in finance. During the series, it is also revealed that Charlotte was voted homecoming queen, prom queen, "most popular", student body president, and track team captain, in addition to being an active cheerleader and teen model.

She is the antithesis of Samantha: optimistic, hopelessly romantic, and a believer in true love and soul mates. She places the most emphasis on emotional love as opposed to lust. From the beginning, Charlotte is searching for her "knight in shining armor", and nothing shakes her belief of finding "the one", getting married, and starting a family. All her dating activity during the show is in pursuit of a long-term, monogamous boyfriend with a view to marriage. As such, she typically dates men of "pedigree", status and money (bankers, doctors, lawyers, etc.).

Charlotte can be a dark horse, and it is learnt that she once had a dalliance with an Orthodox Jewish artist, she dressed in drag for a portrait, and she allowed an artist to paint a picture of her vulva. She can be an "East Side Princess" sometimes, and she and Samantha occasionally come to blows over their differing opinions about love and sex.

In season 3, Charlotte decides she will be married that year and sets about canvassing her married friends to set her up on dates. One married friend usurps her blind date to try and start an affair with her. Horrified, she dashes into the street and trips in front of a taxi, carrying Trey MacDougal (Kyle MacLachlan), an attractive, old-money, Scottish-American cardiologist with pedigree, a Park Avenue apartment and country estate in Connecticut. They fall in love at first sight, and he appears to be everything she has always wanted. Things move quickly and Charlotte, convinced he is the one, suggests they marry. He agrees, and they are married very shortly afterward (with the help of wedding planner Anthony Marentino; a gay Sicilian who is as forceful as Charlotte is timid).

Wishing to "do things the right way," Charlotte has withheld having sex with Trey, hoping for a romantic and traditional wedding night. On the evening before the big day, she gets drunk with the other women and goes to Trey for sex. Unfortunately, it does not go well; Trey reveals he suffers from impotence (though he won't say the word).

While concerned, Charlotte presses ahead with the wedding. Minutes before walking down the aisle, she confides in Carrie about what happened the night before and nearly does not go through with the marriage. As the marriage begins things do not get any better in their intimate relationship, and Trey refuses to address matters either physically or psychologically, resisting their marriage counselor's advice. Matters are not helped by Trey's overbearing mother Bunny (Frances Sternhagen), a manipulative sort who intrudes on Trey and Charlotte's relationship and apartment on a regular basis. Not long into the marriage, on a weekend trip to the MacDougal country estate, Charlotte, frustrated by Trey's lack of sexual attention, kisses the hunky gardener, and is caught by a relative. Though Trey suggests they can stay together and have separate lives, Charlotte won't accept this. She and Trey separate, and she moves back into her old apartment.

While separated, Trey suddenly gets his mojo back and they mend their sexual relationship. But it takes Charlotte getting fed up with being a slave to "the penis" that convinces Trey to grow up and invite Charlotte to move back in, which she does. All seems to be well, and soon Trey tells Charlotte he's ready to try for a baby. Having no luck with natural method of conception, Charlotte seeks fertility treatment and is told she has a very low chance of becoming pregnant. Seeking other options, she begins hormone injections and looks into adopting a Chinese baby girl, which Bunny does not approve of.

A combination of these factors once again ignites old tensions with Trey and Bunny, culminating in Trey's deciding he no longer wants a family. Charlotte tries to adjust to this change, but is clearly upset, since having a husband and family were her dream. Trey finally tells Charlotte that she shouldn't have to give up her dream for him. Trey lets Charlotte keep their apartment after he moves out. However, Bunny is not content to let Charlotte keep the apartment and the apartment becomes a contentious aspect of the divorce proceedings.

When Charlotte's marriage ends, she meets Harry Goldenblatt (Evan Handler), her Jewish divorce lawyer, at the beginning of season 5. She is not attracted to him initially but, spurred on by Anthony, she starts a purely physical relationship with Harry. Harry is the opposite of Trey: short, bald, hairy, uncouth but funny, passionate, and attentive. Their sexual relationship is fulfilling, and eventually they begin dating properly. However, Harry says he cannot be serious with Charlotte because she isn't a Jew.

Believing Harry to be her future, Charlotte converts to Judaism and this sees her struggle with losing her Christian faith and ideologies including Christmas and Easter. After her conversion, Charlotte celebrates her first Shabbat with Harry but loses her temper when he appears to not appreciate all her efforts. The argument quickly devolves into Charlotte's badgering Harry to propose and, feeling pressured, he storms out, and they break up, but not before revealing that Charlotte's dream was in reach after all, that he'd bought a ring.

Charlotte is heartbroken but tries to move on with her life. Sometime later, at a singles event at the synagogue, she bumps into Harry. She tells him she loves him and doesn't care if he never marries her as long as they can be together. Having missed her, too, Harry proposes, and they marry in a traditional Jewish ceremony.

Charlotte, against all the odds, becomes pregnant after acupuncture therapy but loses the baby very early on. Charlotte is crushed, but they later go on to adopt a baby girl, Lily, from China, and it is revealed during Sex and the City that Charlotte later naturally conceives and gives birth to the couple's second daughter, Rose.

=== Miranda Hobbes ===
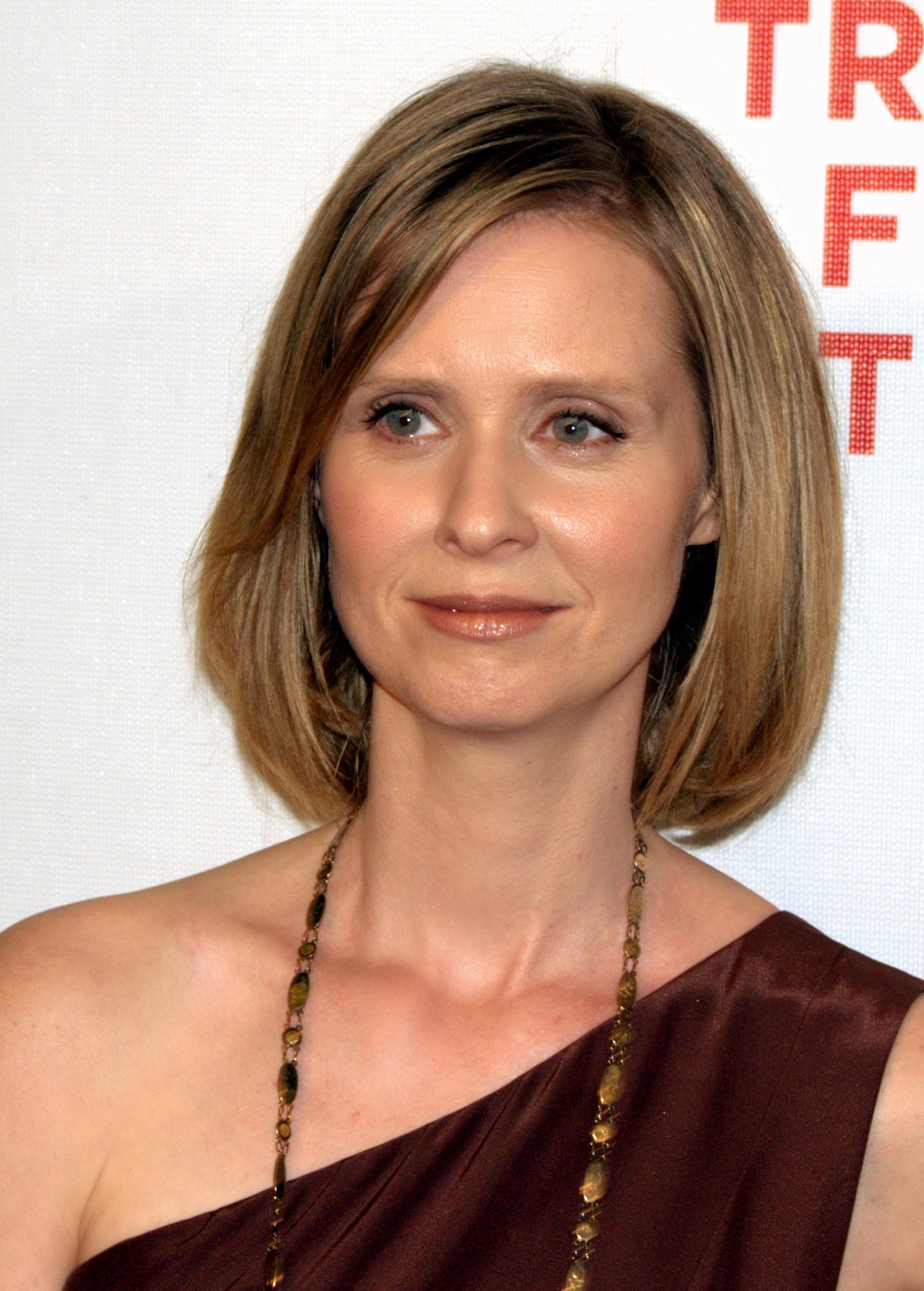
Cynthia Nixon plays the role of lawyer Miranda Hobbes

Miranda Hobbes (Cynthia Nixon) is a career-minded lawyer with cynical views on relationships and men, something she struggles with throughout the show. A 1990 Harvard Law School graduate from the Philadelphia area, she is Carrie's confidante and voice of reason.

Carrie sets up Miranda on a blind date with her geeky friend Skipper, but he is too sweet and passive for Miranda.

Miranda's main relationship is with bartender Steve Brady (David Eigenberg), whom she meets by chance one night. They have a one-night stand, but Steve pursues Miranda, eventually becoming her boyfriend.

Steve and Miranda have a great relationship, but Steve feels uncomfortable with Miranda's success and money given that he makes a low wage. Things come to a head when Miranda attempts to buy Steve a suit to wear to an event at her law firm. He refuses, maxes out his credit cards to buy it, but then returns it and breaks up with her, saying that she deserves someone who is more on her level. Miranda is crushed and wonders if she is being punished for being a financially successful career woman.

Later, in season 2, Miranda runs from Steve when she sees him on the street, but he goes to her house to confront her. They start hanging out as friends but eventually end up getting back together, and Steve moves into Miranda's apartment. Steve is keen to move things forward in their relationship by having a baby, but Miranda cites her career as a barrier to this as she is on partner track at her law firm. Instead, they agree to get a puppy, which proves to be a disaster as she feels she is doing all the work, and Steve behaves like an overgrown child. They break up.

Steve takes Miranda's criticisms to heart and later opens his own bar with Carrie's ex Aidan Shaw. Miranda runs into Steve, who tells her about the bar and thanks her for spurring him on. They begin a friendship of sorts.

In season 4, we discover that Steve has testicular cancer, and Miranda sets out to "help" Steve, realizing he doesn't have healthcare. She helps him through his operation and subsequent treatment, and they become close.

Steve confides that he is depressed about losing a testicle. Feeling sorry for him, Miranda has sex with him. Soon afterward, Miranda discovers she is pregnant (something she thought was impossible, as she had been diagnosed with a "lazy ovary").

At the same time, Charlotte is struggling to get pregnant with Trey's baby and is furious when she discovers that Miranda is not only pregnant but is planning to have an abortion. At the clinic with Carrie, Miranda decides she cannot go through with the procedure and decides to keep the baby. She later gives birth to a son whom she names Brady (Steve's last name).

She and Steve share custody and raise him with the help of Miranda's hired housekeeper/nanny Magda, an older Ukrainian/Eastern European woman who remains a constant in Miranda's life. The show charts Miranda's struggle as a single, working professional mother and her feelings at losing her old single life.

Miranda later realizes she is still in love with Steve. Unfortunately, before she can confess this to Steve, he announces he has a new girlfriend, Debbie—a much younger girl from his native Queens area of New York. Not wishing to rock the boat, Miranda decides not to tell Steve, and things remain platonic between them.

Soon afterward, a new man moves into Miranda's building: Robert Leeds, an attractive African American doctor who works for the New York Knicks basketball team. He is divorced, handsome, and makes it clear that he is interested in Miranda. They start a relationship that becomes serious when Robert tells Miranda he loves her (albeit by giving her a giant cookie with the words, "I Love You", written on it in chocolate chips).

Miranda feels unable to say it back to him, though, and in a moment of epiphany at Brady's first birthday party, she blurts out to Steve that she loves him and is sorry for losing him. Steve reassures her that he loves her too, and soon afterward they break up with their respective partners and get back together.

Miranda and Steve decide to marry in a low-key ceremony in a community garden. Living together in Miranda's one-bedroom apartment (in the same building as her now-hostile ex, Robert) proves to be cramped, and they decide to buy a bigger place and eventually move to a house in Brooklyn (much to Miranda's initial dismay).

In the final episodes of season 6, Miranda and Steve care for Steve's mother Mary, who is suffering from dementia/Alzheimer's. Miranda tells Steve that his mother can come stay with them in the Brooklyn house and even bathes her when Mary has a bad episode. Magda comments to Miranda that the things she does for Mary are what's called love.

=== Samantha Jones ===
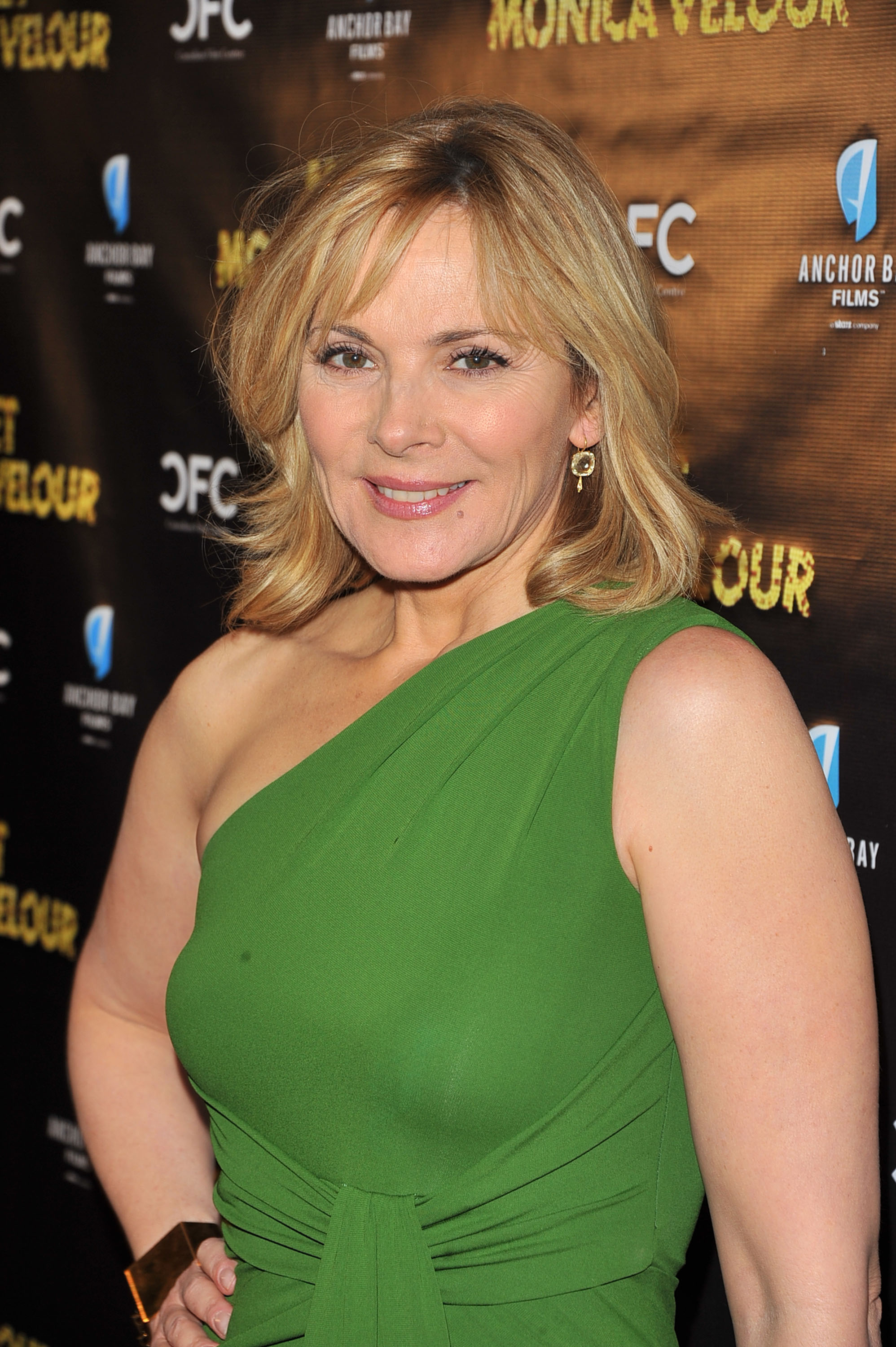
Kim Cattrall plays PR businesswoman Samantha Jones

The oldest and most sexually confident of the foursome, Samantha Jones (Kim Cattrall) is an independent businesswoman with a career in public relations (PR). She is confident, strong, and extremely outspoken, and calls herself a "try-sexual" (meaning she'll try anything once). Early on in the show, Samantha declares she has given up on relationships and has decided to just have sex "like a man", that is: without emotions or feelings, and purely for physical gratification.

Samantha has numerous, extremely brief sexual relationships throughout the show, including a lesbian relationship with an artist named Maria (Sônia Braga). This is her first stab at monogamy, but she soon gets bored and goes back to her old ways. Later, she wins the PR business for hotel magnate Richard Wright (James Remar), who is her male equivalent: good-looking, sexually carefree, and not interested in long-term relationships. She and Richard soon end up together and Samantha feels herself falling for him and is no longer attracted to other men.

Frightened by this, she attempts to hide her feelings, but Richard is also falling for her. He pursues her with expensive gifts and romantic gestures, and despite her reluctance, they begin a monogamous relationship. Not long afterward, Samantha becomes suspicious of Richard and catches him cheating on her, which breaks her heart. They reunite not long afterward when Richard apologizes and showers her with expensive gifts. Samantha initially resists and trashes his reputation all over town but soon she gives in and takes him back. Soon after, Samantha develops jealousy and is unable to trust Richard around other women. She decides to end the relationship before he breaks her heart again.

In the final season, Samantha seduces young waiter Jerry/Smith Jerrod (Jason Lewis), a much younger struggling actor. Samantha and Smith have intense sexual chemistry, but she treats him as just another casual fling, although she gives him PR help to bolster his acting career. He mentions being a recovering alcoholic who attends AA. Samantha isn't looking for anything serious, but she is bothered that Smith seems too immature for her. Just when she starts being jealous of Carrie's relationship with the worldly Aleksandr, she runs into Richard Wright at a party she attends with Smith. She and Richard have a brief sexual encounter, but it's clear she's upset it wasn't what she thought she wanted. Samantha cries in the elevator, both for the meaningless sex with Richard and for hurting Smith, but she's surprised to find Smith waiting for her in the lobby.

Smith manages to win Samantha's heart thanks to the strength of their physical connection, and the fact that he just won't put up with her attitude. When Samantha is diagnosed with breast cancer and undergoes chemotherapy treatments, she tries to push him away, but Smith won't be budged. He's there for her, no matter what. When she loses her hair, Smith shaves his head to support her. When she loses her sex drive due to chemo, she is willing to give him his sexual freedom when he's shooting a movie on location. Smith is patient, however, and refuses. When Smith flies back to surprise Samantha in the middle of the night and tell her he loves her, she doesn't respond in kind, she tells him he's meant more to her than any man she's ever known.

They remain together and, in the first film, it is revealed that Samantha has moved to Los Angeles with Smith to further his career and become his manager/agent. However, she breaks up with him in the end because as much as she loves him, she feels she's made their relationship and his career first priority ahead of herself. And she loves herself too much to do that. Plus, she misses having a smorgasbord of men, and she misses her life in New York. She and Smith stay friends.

It has been claimed by Louise Perry that Samantha's character was based on a stereotypical portrayal of the life of a promiscuous gay man.

=== Recurring roles ===
List of notable recurring roles during series

Portrayed by	Character	Notes	Recurring seasons	Episodes	Episode count
Chris Noth	John James "Mr. Big" Preston	Carrie's on-again-off-again boyfriend, later husband	1–6	1.01–6.20	41
David Eigenberg	Steven "Steve" Brady	Miranda's boyfriend, later husband	2–6	2.08–6.20	41
Willie Garson	Stanford Blatch	Carrie's friend	1–6	1.01–6.18	27
Kyle MacLachlan	Trey MacDougal	Charlotte's first husband	3–4	3.07–4.18	23
John Corbett	Aidan Shaw	Carrie's boyfriend, briefly fiancé	3–4, 6	3.05–4.16, 6.01	22
Evan Handler	Harrison "Harry" Goldenblatt	Charlotte's lawyer and second husband	5–6	5.06–6.20	18
Jason Lewis	Jerry "Smith" Jerrod	Samantha's boyfriend	6	6.02–6.20	18
Lynn Cohen	Magda	Miranda's housekeeper	3–6	3.03–6.20	13
James Remar	Richard Wright	Samantha's boyfriend	4–5, 6	4.10–5.03, 6.13	12
Mario Cantone	Anthony Marentino	Charlotte's wedding planner and friend	3–6	3.11–6.20	12
Frances Sternhagen	Bunny MacDougal	Trey's mother	3–5	3.09–5.06	10
Mikhail Baryshnikov	Aleksandr Petrovsky	Carrie's boyfriend	6	6.12–6.20	9
Ron Livingston	Jack Berger	Carrie's boyfriend	5–6	5.05–6.06	8
Sean Palmer	Marcus Adant	Stanford's boyfriend	5–6	5.04–6.18	8
Bridget Moynahan	Natasha Naginsky	Mr. Big's second wife	2–3	2.17–3.17	7
Ben Weber	Skipper Johnston	Miranda's boyfriend	1–2	1.01–2.14	7
Blair Underwood	Dr. Robert E. Leeds	Miranda's boyfriend	6	6.09–6.14	5
Candice Bergen	Enid Mead / Enid Frick	Carrie's publisher at Vogue	4–6	4.17-6.18	3
Sônia Braga	Maria Diega Reyes	Samantha's girlfriend	4	4.03–4.05	3

== Episodes ==
Season	Episodes		Originally released	
Season	Episodes		First released	Last released
1	12		June 6, 1998	August 23, 1998
2	18		June 6, 1999	October 3, 1999
3	18		June 4, 2000	October 15, 2000
4	18		June 3, 2001	February 10, 2002
5	8		July 21, 2002	September 8, 2002
6	20	12	June 22, 2003	September 14, 2003
6	20	8	January 4, 2004	February 22, 2004
Films			May 30, 2008	May 27, 2010

== Synopsis ==
=== Season 1 (1998) ===
Carrie Bradshaw lives in Manhattan and writes a column called "Sex and the City". At a birthday party for Miranda, Carrie and her friends talk about having sex "like men", meaning without emotional attachment. She puts the theory to test and sleeps with a man who had previously broken her heart many times. Only this time she treats him like he had treated her and discovers that he seemed quite eager to see her again the next time they meet. Carrie discusses her relationships candidly with her best friend Stanford Blatch who is gay and perpetually looking for love.

Carrie has many chance encounters with a handsome businessman whom Samantha refers to as "Mr. Big". They begin to date, but Carrie is dismayed to find out he is still seeing other people. Although he eventually agrees to exclusivity, he doesn't introduce Carrie to his mother and won't refer to her as "the one", so rather than going on a planned vacation with him, Carrie breaks it off.

Carrie sets up Miranda with her friend Skipper. Miranda and he date on and off; he is more laid back while Miranda is more forceful. After they break up, Miranda sees him with another woman and feels compelled to resume their relationship, but they again break up when he wants exclusivity, and she does not.

Charlotte dates a marriage-minded man, but they clash over china patterns. She declines to have anal sex with another boyfriend and also consents to pose nude for a famous painter.

Samantha sleeps with an artist who likes to videotape his encounters, with Charlotte's doorman, with a married couple, and with others. When she meets James, who seems utterly perfect for her, she's heartbroken to discover that he has an extremely small penis.

=== Season 2 (1999) ===
Carrie dates a baseball player while on the rebound but breaks it off when she realizes she's not over Big. She then dates a sell-out filmmaker, a shoplifter, and a nice guy she scares away by snooping, and then takes up with Big again. She at first keeps this from her friends. Her and Big's relationship is rocky, and when he announces that he might have to move to Paris for a year but doesn't overtly invite Carrie to come with him, they break up a second time. Carrie then tries without success to convert a friend-with-benefits to something more, dates a writer with a great family but who is always "early" in bed, and then a recovering alcoholic who uses Carrie to replace his old addiction. She then runs into Big, returned from Paris, and his new 20-something fiancée, Natasha (played by Bridget Moynahan).

Miranda dates a dirty talker, fakes it with an ophthalmologist, and tries to adjust to a guy who likes to watch porn during sex. By the time she meets Steve, the bartender, she's unwilling to believe he is as nice as he seems. They start dating but the differences in their schedules and their finances lead to a breakup. She winds up back in bed with Steve, but not before dating a guy who wants to get caught, a Peeping Tom in the next building, and a divorced dad.

Charlotte encounters a legendary purveyor of cunnilingus, a handy actor next door, a widower on the make, a man who undergoes adult circumcision, a famous actor, a too-effeminate pastry chef, a shoe salesman with a foot fetish, and a 20-something guy who gives her crabs.

Despite a brief attempt at couples therapy, Samantha breaks up with James. She then sleeps with a litigator, a salsa dancer, her personal trainer, a sports fan who can only rally when his team does well, and Charlotte's brother. She then meets a man whose penis is too big even for her.

The end of season two also marks the end of characters' talking directly to the camera.

=== Season 3 (2000) ===
Carrie starts off dating a politician, followed by a bisexual man. Big marries Natasha, and Carrie meets Aidan, a furniture maker. They have a virtually flaw-free relationship until Carrie and Big begin an affair. When Natasha catches Carrie in Natasha and Big's apartment, Carrie and Big's affair ends as do eventually both Big's marriage and Carrie's relationship with Aidan.

Miranda and Steve move in together. He tells Miranda he'd like them to have a baby, but a puppy purchase instead alerts Miranda to the fact that they're very different when it comes to maturity. Steve moves out and Miranda makes partner at her law firm. She also goes on to date a phone sex guy, a fake ER doctor, a guy who doesn't swallow his food, and a police detective.

Charlotte, looking for a husband, dates an investment banker with an anger management problem, a photographer who gets her into menswear, a bad kisser, and a climax name caller. She then meets Trey MacDougal; despite an awkward "proposal", the discovery of his low libido and inability to perform sexually the night before their marriage, and conflict with his domineering mother, the two marry. They begin their marriage with a sexless honeymoon, and as sex remains an ongoing problem in their relationship, the two eventually separate.

Samantha sleeps with a firefighter, a short man, her assistant, a black guy with a disapproving sister, a recreational Viagra user, a guy who tastes bad, Trey's Scottish cousin, a dildo model, and a college-aged virgin. She also has a menopause scare, gets tested for HIV, and buys a new apartment in the Meatpacking District, where she has to make peace with the transgender women on her street.

After Carrie's break-ups with Big and Aidan, she dates a guy who still lives at home, teaches a class at the Learning Annex on how to meet men, gets mugged, and tries to apologize to Natasha. She and Big also make an attempt at being friends.

=== Season 4 (2001–02) ===
After a chance meeting with Aidan at the opening of a bar he co-owns, Carrie convinces him to restart their relationship. He moves into her apartment after buying it when her building goes co-op and then proposes. Despite her misgivings, Carrie accepts the proposal and then eventually realizes she's not ready for marriage. Despite discussing her concerns and initially agreeing to give her more time, Aidan soon pressures Carrie for marriage. She realizes this is because he does not trust her, given her past affair with Big. They break up and he moves out, and Carrie buys her apartment after Charlotte lends her the down payment in the form of the engagement ring she received from Trey. At the end of Season Four, Carrie discovers that Big has sold his apartment and is moving to Napa, California.

Charlotte and Trey are living apart but continuing to have marital relations; they eventually reconcile, and Charlotte moves back into their shared apartment. They decide to try for a baby but realize Charlotte is reproductively challenged; after fertility treatments and discussing adoption, their marriage breaks apart under the strain and they decide to divorce.

Miranda supports Steve through testicular cancer and surgery. Later, when he feels emasculated by the surgery, they have sex and Miranda gets pregnant. She initially considers an abortion, which is particularly distressing to Charlotte, as she deals with her struggles to get pregnant, but Miranda decides to keep the baby.

Samantha flirts with a priest, has nude photos taken of herself, tries to have a relationship with a lesbian, and sleeps with a baby talker, a wrestling coach, and a farmer. She then lands a big PR account with resolutely single hotel magnate Richard Wright. They begin a relationship that starts out as purely sexual but becomes something more to both of them, and they attempt monogamy. However, she eventually catches him cheating, and they break up.

=== Season 5 (2002) ===
Carrie spends time by herself in Season Five; she fears this means she will be fired from writing her sex column, but instead a publisher wants to turn the columns into a book. A book tour lands her in San Francisco, where she reunites briefly with Big. In New York, she meets Jack Berger, a fellow author with whom she feels sparks, but who is attached.

Samantha tries again with Richard but finds herself constantly paranoid. On a trip to Atlantic City with Richard and the girls, she cannot overcome her lack of trust in him and breaks it off for good.

Miranda is now mother to son Brady and finds it difficult to work, date, and carry on her previous lifestyle. Steve is supportive, and she falls into bed with him one afternoon, making her question her feelings for him.

Charlotte has a run-in with her former mother-in-law over the legalities of the apartment she shared with Trey, and she hires Harry Goldenblatt as her divorce attorney. Despite his physical shortcomings she finds herself attracted to him, and they begin a sexual relationship. She soon finds that she is developing real feelings for him. Harry, however, reveals that he must marry within his Jewish faith, causing Charlotte to actually consider conversion.

=== Season 6 (2003–04) ===
Carrie begins dating Jack Berger, who is termed her best 'mental match' of all her relationships. However, his struggles as an author and her success with her upcoming book cause too much conflict between them, and they break up. Big returns to New York for angioplasty, and Carrie realizes she still has feelings for him; she also realizes he still cannot fully commit. After he returns to Napa, she meets Aleksandr, a famous Russian artist. Aleksandr seems to be attentive to her in a way that Big never was, and he asks her to come to Paris with him. She does, briefly, but realizes how inattentive he is when working, and she breaks it off with him just as Big arrives in Paris, looking for her, ready to finally commit to her being "the one".

Charlotte decides that life with Harry, who accepts her fertility issues, would be worth converting to Judaism. After this process, she presses Harry to "set the date" in an insulting way and he breaks it off with her. However, they run into each other at a mixer and, after her tearful apology, rekindle their relationship and eventually marry. After fertility treatments fail, they decide to adopt, and eventually learn they have been approved to adopt a child from China.

Once Miranda realizes she's still in love with Steve, he begins a serious relationship with someone else (Debbie), and so she does the same with Robert (played by Blair Underwood). However, at their son Brady's first birthday party, they reveal their feelings for each other and renew their relationship. Miranda proposes to Steve, and they marry in a community park. Needing more room for their growing family, she consents to moving to Brooklyn, where they buy a brownstone. After Steve's mother Mary (played by Anne Meara) is revealed to have suffered a stroke and subsequent memory loss, she moves in with the couple.

Samantha begins a relationship with a much younger waiter, Jerry Jerrod, who turns out to be a struggling actor. She uses her PR skills to help his career, even changing his name to Smith Jerrod. Despite trying to keep their relationship as casual as her others, she develops true feelings for him. Smith supports her after she is diagnosed with breast cancer, shaving his own head in sympathy after catching her shaving her head when chemotherapy makes her hair fall out. He also insists on waiting for her when her treatment diminishes her sex drive. When he flies home from his movie shoot just to tell her that he loves her, she replies, "You have meant more to me than any man I've ever known."

The season and the series concludes with the four women reunited in New York City, and with Carrie receiving a phone call from Big (finally revealing his first name, John), telling her that his Napa house is up for sale, and he is headed back to New York. Carrie's final voiceover states: "The most exciting, challenging and significant relationship of all is the one you have with yourself. And if you find someone to love the you you love, well, that's just fabulous."

== Reception ==
=== Critical response ===
Critical response of Sex and the City
Season	Rotten Tomatoes	Metacritic
1	46% (35 reviews)	52 (17 reviews)
2	60% (5 reviews)	—N/a
3	67% (6 reviews)	—N/a
4	86% (7 reviews)	—N/a
5	73% (11 reviews)	—N/a
6	90% (21 reviews)	—N/a

Sex and the City premiered on HBO on June 6, 1998, and was one of the highest-rated comedies of the television season. On the review aggregator website Rotten Tomatoes, the series holds an overall 70% approval rating based on critic reviews. For its sixth and final season, 90% of 21 critic reviews are positive and the website's consensus reads, "Despite problematic blindspots, Sex and the City secures its spot as a harbinger of authentic, women-centric ensemble television to come." On Metacritic, the entire series has a score of 64 out of 100 indicating “generally favorable” reviews.

=== Awards and recognition ===
Over the course of its six seasons, Sex and the City was nominated for over 50 Primetime Emmy Awards and won seven: two for Outstanding Casting for a Comedy Series (Jennifer McNamara), one for Outstanding Costumes, one for Outstanding Comedy Series, one for Outstanding Directing for a Comedy Series, one for Outstanding Lead Actress in a Comedy Series (Sarah Jessica Parker), and one for Outstanding Supporting Actress in a Comedy Series (Cynthia Nixon).

The show was also nominated for 24 Golden Globe Awards and won eight: three for Best Television Series – Musical or Comedy, four for Best Actress – Television Series Musical or Comedy (Sarah Jessica Parker), and one for Best Supporting Actress – Series, Miniseries, or Television Film (Kim Cattrall).

In 2007, Sex and the City was listed as one of TIME magazine's "100 Best TV Shows of All-TIME." Entertainment Weekly included it in its end-of-the-decade "best-of" list, stating, "The clothes from SATC raise your cosmos! A toast to the wonderful wardrobe from Sex and the City, which taught us that no flower is too big, no skirt too short, and no shoe too expensive."

For its 65th anniversary, TV Guide ranked the episode "My Motherboard, My Self" as the eighth-best episode of the 21st century.

In 2023, Variety ranked Sex and the City as the sixth-greatest TV show of all time.

=== Fashion ===
The New York Times in 2013 credited Sex and the City and its costume designer Patricia Field with "starting crazes for nameplate necklaces, Manolo Blahnik shoes, flower corsages and visible bra straps". Field described the show's influence as "like sitting at the bottom of an atom bomb". A 2018 feature in The Guardian on the show's lasting influence quoted fashion editor Chelsea Fairless: "I would venture to say that the mix of high fashion and fast fashion that Patricia Field brought to the show influenced most people who work in fashion in one way or another." It also pointed to fan accounts on Instagram like "Every outfit on Sex and the City" and "Carrie Dragshaw" as a testament to the continued popular appeal of the show's fashion.

=== Criticism ===
Criticism has been expressed about the influence the show has on adolescents and how the images displayed on the show affect the way women and young girls view themselves.

Tanya Gold of The Daily Telegraph stated, "Sex and the City is to feminism what sugar is to dental care” and said the show was dominated by images of woman as either child or sex object, demonstrated by the opening credits which show the protagonist in a ballet skirt Gold described as "the sort that toddlers wear", then is passed by a bus ad for her column showing a scantily clad photo of herself. "In another [episode], Carrie realizes she is homeless because she has spent $40,000 on shoes and does not have a deposit for an apartment. (In this crisis, she cries and borrows the money for the deposit—what child would do anything else?)."

In addition to obsessing about finding and keeping a man, the lead character also routinely hides her true thoughts and feelings from said man. The show uses voiceovers to reveal Carrie's inner thought life, which is often in conflict with how she is expressing herself externally. As pop culture expert Ashli L. Dykes points out, "... [the] fear that men will no longer find a woman attractive if she reveals her true self is in contrast to the relationships among the four main female characters..."

Academic critics, however, disagree on whether Sex and the City was truly anti-feminist, feminist, or post-feminist. Some argue that whatever label is applied to the show, it offered an important contribution "to ongoing dialogue" and that because it "shows women in a world where they can be feminine, attractive, and feminist at the same time ... the series gives a forum to a renewed postfeminist debate."

Andrea Press criticised the show for how it handled topics such as unexpected pregnancy, stating that it contrasts with feminist progressive thought. In one episode, Miranda is faced with an unexpected pregnancy, which causes Carrie to reflect on her own experience of pregnancy and abortion. Press argued that Carrie's shame when sharing this story with her boyfriend serves to "undermine" the hard-fought freedoms that allowed her choice with "multiple critical perspectives toward the act". Press also wrote that, while the show is lauded as a champion of progressive feminism, its characters adhere to a strongly traditional view of female gender roles with a focus on appearance, glamour, and consumerism. The outfits the characters wear are as important as the storyline itself (and sometimes are the storyline itself). A central message of the show is that consumption is key, and we are fed constant marketing messages throughout the series.

In retrospective analysis of the show, critics have generally reassessed Carrie Bradshaw as an unsympathetic protagonist, despite the show's portrayal of her as a positive figure. In 2013, Glamour called Carrie "the worst" character on the show, saying that "her brattiness and self-absorption eclipsed her redeeming qualities and even her awesome shoes." In a 2010 retrospective about the previous two decades in pop culture, ABC News named Carrie one of the ten worst characters of the past twenty years, calling her a "snippy, self-righteous Manhattan snob" and citing the character's actions in Sex and the City 2 as evidence that she was beyond personal growth or redemption. Emily Nussbaum of The New Yorker, looking back on the show a decade after it went off the air, argued Bradshaw was "the unacknowledged first female anti-hero on television," who began as a "happy, curious explorer, out companionably smoking with modellizers," but from the second season on she "spun out, becoming anxious, obsessive, and, despite her charm, wildly self-centered." Nussbaum also asserted that it is only over time that the show's reputation has "shrunk and faded," largely due to disappointment that the show "gave in" to the limits of romantic comedy toward the end of the series. Until then, Nussbaum writes, Sex and the City "was sharp, iconoclastic television." In answer to the question of why the show is now "so often portrayed as a set of empty, static cartoons, an embarrassment to womankind," Nussbaum wrote: "It's a classic misunderstanding, I think, stemming from an unexamined hierarchy: the assumption that anything stylized (or formulaic, or pleasurable, or funny, or feminine, or explicit about sex rather than about violence, or made collaboratively) must be inferior." Nussbaum also pushed against criticism of Sex and the City as anti-feminist, arguing for a more complex view of the characters as situated within different waves of feminism: "Miranda and Carrie were second-wave feminists, who believed in egalitarianism; Charlotte and Samantha were third-wave feminists, focused on exploiting the power of femininity, from opposing angles."

A 2018 article in The Guardian entitled "'That show was as white as it gets!': Sex and the City's problematic legacy", pointed to the lack of any non-white series regulars and "racial insensitivities" in the show like Carrie's "ghetto gold" reference or Samantha's wearing an afro wig to cover her baldness from chemotherapy. It also referenced the #wokecharlotte memes which gained popularity on social media in 2017, in which Charlotte chastises Carrie for comments that retrospectively appear insensitive and ignorant (i.e. Carrie's calling bisexuality a "layover on the way to Gay Town", or Samantha using transphobic language to refer to the sex workers outside her apartment). The creator of the memes stated that "it is satisfying to see the show get called out for the stuff that wouldn't hold up in 2017. It's true that it was progressive for its time but that doesn't mean contemporary viewers should be dismissive of some of its more problematic content." On the 20th anniversary of the show's premiere, The Guardian published an opinion piece by Rebecca Nicholson arguing that the show should not be discounted because of its retrospective flaws, but should still be appreciated for the fact that "it was, and is, a brilliant, daring, pioneering show."

== Broadcast and distribution ==
Season one of Sex and the City aired on HBO from June to August 1998. Season two was broadcast from June until October 1999. Season three aired from June until October 2000. Season four was broadcast in two parts: from June until August 2001, and then in January and February 2002. Season five, truncated due to Parker's pregnancy, aired on HBO during the summer of 2002. The twenty episodes of the final season, season six, aired in two parts: from June until September 2003 and during January and February 2004.

=== Syndication ===
Sex and the City is currently syndicated in the US by HBO corporate sibling (under Warner Bros. Discovery) Warner Bros. Television Distribution. CBS Studios (successors to Rysher Entertainment and Paramount Domestic Television) and their distribution arm own international rights. The series was filmed with traditional broadcast syndication in mind during its run, and pre-planned scenes with different dialogue and content were created specifically for syndication, along with appropriate cuts of each episode to fit a 22-minute timeslot which includes advertising.

==== United States ====
The United States cable channel HBO was the original broadcaster; HBO Max now carries the original run of the entire series as originally aired. TBS and WGN America were the first US channels to syndicate the show and utilize the secondary syndicated cut of the series; it also aired on broadcast stations for several seasons. As of 2021, E! continues to occasionally broadcast the syndicated version of the series.

In February 2021, a remastered high-definition version of the series was released on HBO Max. The film negatives were rescanned at 4K resolution and reformatted to a 16:9 aspect ratio by extending the sides of the frame. The series became available in 4K HDR and Dolby Atmos in May 2023 following the rebranding of HBO Max to Max. It was released on Netflix April 1, 2024.

==== Canada ====
In Canada cable channel Bravo aired the first run of the show every Saturday at 11:00 PM, a few weeks behind the U.S. HBO broadcast (the series pre-dated the 2008 existence of HBO Canada).

==== Australia ====
In Australia, the Nine Network aired the first run of the show every Monday between 9:30 pm and 11:00 pm. After 2004 the cable channel W aired it until summer 2008 when Arena started airing it in a block with Will & Grace with promos stating, "all the good guys are gay". The series was repeated on Network Ten from 2005 to 2010, and on Eleven (later known today as 10 Peach) from February 2011. It currently airs in syndication on the cable channel Fox Showcase and occasionally plays marathons on the cable channel Binge, which plays back-to-back episodes of several TV shows.

==== Ireland ====
In Ireland, TV3 premiered Sex and the City in February 1999. Since 2006, repeats of the series aired on 3e.

==== United Kingdom ====
Channel 4 originally aired the series in the UK with the first episode shown on 3 February 1999. As of August 2009 a double bill of the show airs each weeknight at 10:30 pm on Comedy Central and a double bill airs on Wednesdays from 9 pm on 5*. From 2015, the show has been repeated on CBS Drama. Starting on February 26, 2018, the series returned to Channel 4 on its music-oriented channel, 4Music. From 2020, the series has been aired on Sky Comedy.

== Home media ==
The first five seasons of Sex and the City were released on VHS in box sets.

All six seasons of Sex and the City have been released commercially on DVD, with season six being split into two parts. They have been released officially in region 1 (Americas), region 2 (Europe & Middle East), region 3 (Korea), and region 4 (Oceania & South Pacific) formats. In addition to their region encoding, releases vary depending on the region in which they were released.

In addition to standard single-season DVD box sets of the show, limited edition collectors' editions have been released that include all six seasons in one complete set. These also vary among regions (and the regions are defined differently). While Europe got a complete set that came with special "shoebox" packaging (a reference to Carrie Bradshaw's love for shoes), the US and Canada version came packaged in a more traditional fold-out suede case and with an additional bonus DVD that includes many special features. Mexico and Oceania's edition come packaged in a beauty case.

As well as missing out on some special features, many in Europe had trouble with the region 2 edition of the season 1 DVD. The season was not converted into a PAL video signal; it instead remained in its original American NTSC format, which caused compatibility problems with some European television sets and DVD players. All subsequent Region 2 DVD releases of the program were appropriately transferred to PAL video using the original film prints, and season 1 has since been re-released in PAL format.

Outside the US, Sex and the City boxed sets were released through Paramount Pictures. American and Canadian DVDs were released through the program's original broadcasters, HBO. In Australia, single editions have been released, wherein each disc is sold separately. In South Korea, complete, six-season, special DVD shoebox sets were released. In Brazil, the first and fifth seasons were released on DVD Dual, but all other seasons were released in DVD box sets.

Selected episodes are also available as part of the Sex and the City Essentials DVD collection. These are four separately packaged discs containing three selected episodes that fit a common theme:

- The Best of Lust: Contains the episodes "The Fuck Buddy", "Running with Scissors", and "The Turtle and the Hare".
- The Best of Mr. Big: Contains the episodes "Sex and the City", "Ex and the City", and "I Heart NY".
- The Best of Romance: Contains the episodes "Baby, Talk is Cheap", "Hop, Skip and a Week", and "An American Girl in Paris (Part Deux)".
- The Best of Breakups: Contains the episodes "Don't Ask, Don't Tell", "I Love a Charade", and "The Post-it Always Sticks Twice".
- The Best of Fashion: Contains the episodes "Secret Sex", "The Real Me", and "Luck Be an Old Lady". This DVD was only released to Target stores in the US and was the only DVD of the "Essentials" collection to have a colored cover instead of a black and white one like the other four.

The high-definition remastered series including the two films was released on Blu-ray on November 2, 2021.

== Soundtrack releases ==
Two digital CDs (the albums from Irma Records) contain tracks used in the show's actual soundtrack:

- Sex and the City – Soundtrack [Import]

2000/2001/2002
Sire Records
Includes the main theme from the show, written by Douglas J. Cuomo.

- Sex and the City – Official Soundtrack (Two-disc set)

March 1, 2004
Sony TV
36 hits, including the songs of Beyoncé, Kylie Minogue, Justin Timberlake, Aretha Franklin, Nina Simone, Daniel Bedingfield, Anastacia, Kelly Rowland, Sugababes, Cyndi Lauper, Jamiroquai and Britney Spears among many others.

== Franchise ==
Sex and the City
- Created by: Darren Star
- Original work: Sex and the City by Candace Bushnell
- Owners: HBO; Warner Bros. Discovery
- Years: 1998–2025

Films and television
- Films: Sex and the City; Sex and the City 2
- Television series: Sex and the City; The Carries Diaries; And Just Like That...

=== Films ===
==== Sex and the City (2008) ====
A feature film based on Sex and the City, written, produced and directed by Michael Patrick King, was released in May 2008. The four lead actresses returned to reprise their roles, as did Chris Noth, Evan Handler, David Eigenberg, Jason Lewis, Mario Cantone and Willie Garson. In addition, Jennifer Hudson appears in the film as Carrie's assistant. The film is set four years after the series finale. The film was released to mixed reviews by critics; at the box office, it was the highest-grossing romantic comedy of the year. The film was released on DVD on September 23, 2008.

==== Sex and the City 2 (2010) ====
Sex and the City 2 was released in May 2010. The film stars Sarah Jessica Parker, Cynthia Nixon, Kristin Davis, Kim Cattrall, and Noth, who reprised their roles again, as well as Handler, Eigenberg, Lewis, Cantone and Garson. It also features cameos from Liza Minnelli, Miley Cyrus, and Penélope Cruz. The film is set two years after the events of the first film. It was critically panned but proved to be a commercial success at the box office.

==== Canceled third film ====
It was rumoured in 2016 that a script for the third and final film had been approved. However, on September 28, 2017, Parker said to Extra that the film had been cancelled, stating, "I'm disappointed. We had this beautiful, funny, heartbreaking, joyful, very relatable script and story. It's not just disappointing that we don't get to tell the story and have that experience, but more so for that audience that has been so vocal in wanting another movie." It was reported that Cattrall did not want to be involved in the film after learning of storylines involving Mr. Big dying of a heart attack and Samantha receiving sexting and nude pictures from Miranda's teenage son Brady. Cattrall later clarified in 2019 that she opted not to appear in a third film, explaining she "went past the finish line" portraying the character of Samantha and because of her love for the franchise.

The third movie plot was later readapted as the 2021 television series And Just Like That…, with Cattrall not returning. Originally billed as a miniseries, it was renewed for a second season, with Cattrall reprised her role for a brief cameo in the season finale.

=== Prequel series ===
The Carrie Diaries is a prequel to the original series, based on the book of the same name by Candace Bushnell. The series premiered on The CW on January 14, 2013. AnnaSophia Robb plays the role of young Carrie Bradshaw. On May 8, 2014, The CW cancelled The Carrie Diaries after two seasons.

=== Adaptations ===
The Brazilian television series Sexo e as Negas was adapted from the original series and released on September 16, 2014. The version introduced some differences: the four ladies were black actresses, and the show takes place in the suburbs.

=== And Just Like That... ===
In December 2020, it was reported that the cancelled third movie plot was redeveloped as a television series at HBO Max, without Kim Cattrall's character returning. In January 2021, the revival, titled as And Just Like That..., was officially confirmed at HBO Max, with Sarah Jessica Parker, Cynthia Nixon, and Kristin Davis returning.

Originally billed as a limited series, it was renewed for a second season in March 2022, in which Cattrall reprised her role for a cameo in the season finale In August 2023, the series was renewed for a third season.

== See also ==
- List of Primetime Emmy Awards received by HBO
