= David Eigenberg =

American actor (born 1964)

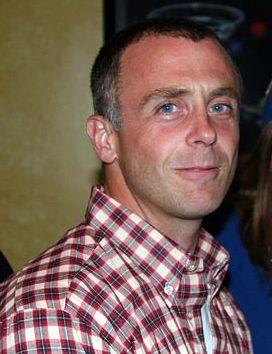
- Eigenberg in July 2005
- Born: May 17, 1964 (age 62); Manhasset, New York, U.S.
- Occupation: Actor
- Years active: 1989–present
- Spouse: Chrysti Kotik (m. 2002)
- Children: 2

David Eigenberg (born May 17, 1964) is an American actor. He is known for his roles as Steve Brady on the HBO series Sex and the City and its revival series And Just Like That... and as Firefighter/Lieutenant/Captain Christopher Herrmann on NBC's Chicago Fire.

== Early life and education ==
Eigenberg was born in Manhasset, New York, on Long Island, and grew up in Naperville, Illinois, the only boy in a family of six children. His mother, Beverly, owned pre-schools, and his father, Harry, was a certified public accountant. Eigenberg's father was Jewish and his mother was Episcopalian; he was raised in his mother's faith.

After graduating from Naperville Central High School in 1982, Eigenberg enlisted in the United States Marine Corps Reserve, serving for three years (1982–1986), and was honorably discharged at the rank of Lance Corporal.

== Career ==
Eigenberg's first recurring role was on Homicide: Life on the Street, where he portrayed a copycat sniper, before appearing in The Practice. He voiced the role of Nermal in Garfield: The Movie. He made an appearance on an episode of ER during the show's final season, and made an appearance in the movie Daybreak. He appeared in the American TV show The King of Queens, in the episode entitled "Flash Photography", where he portrayed the groom of Carrie's annoying friend.

In 2002, Eigenberg starred as the short-lived character Officer Ross in the Season 3 episode of Third Watch, entitled "Superheroes: Part 1". In July 2004, he appeared in the sci-fi series The 4400. He appeared as Carl Morrissey in part two of the pilot, entitled "The New and Improved Carl Morrissey". Eigenberg appeared as a suspect in the sixth episode of the TV series Raines, entitled "Inner Child", which first aired on April 20, 2007.

He appeared in an episode of Ghost Whisperer, alongside Jennifer Love Hewitt, and in CBS's NCIS as Ted Bankston, a former NSA analyst, in the Season 6 episode, "Dagger".

Eigenberg's best known role is the role of Steve Brady in the HBO series Sex and the City. The on-and-off-again boyfriend and eventual husband to Miranda Hobbes (played by Cynthia Nixon), Eigenberg later reprised the role in both Sex and the City films in 2008 and 2010, and in the revival series And Just Like That... in 2022.

In 2009, he appeared in Season 6 episode 13 of Cold Case titled "Breaking News". He played the 1988 version of Nathan Kravet. In 2010, he appeared as Agent Russell Goldman in the Season 5 episode of Criminal Minds, entitled "Parasite". In March 2011, he appeared in Season 3 of Castle, in the episode "One Life to Lose", as Peter Connelly. He appeared in the May 16, 2012 episode of Law & Order: Special Victims Unit, entitled "Strange Beauty". In the fall of 2012, Eigenberg joined the cast of NBC's Chicago Fire as Senior Firefighter/Lieutenant Christopher Herrmann.

=== Stage career ===
Eigenberg first appeared on Broadway in the original production of John Guare's Six Degrees of Separation as the "Hustler" from 1990 to 1992. He returned from 2003 to 2004 as Toddy Koovitz in the original Broadway production of the Richard Greenberg play Take Me Out.

== Personal life ==
Eigenberg and his wife Chrysti Kotik have a son born in 2009 and a daughter born in 2014. In January 2022, it was reported that Eigenberg had been diagnosed with hearing loss and that it inspired his on-screen character's hearing loss on And Just Like That... and Chicago Fire.

== Selected filmography ==
=== Film ===
Year	Title	Role	Notes
2002	The Mothman Prophecies	Ed Fleischman	
2004	Around the Bend	John	
2004	Garfield: The Movie	Nermal (voice)	
2006	Driftwood	Norris	
2007	The Trouble with Romance	Paul	
2008	Sex and the City	Steve Brady	
2010	See You in September	Max	
2010	Sex and the City 2	Steve	
2013	Robosapien: Rebooted	Allan	Also released as "Cody the Robosapien"

=== Television ===
Year	Title	Role	Notes
1993	Daybreak	Bucky	Television film
1996	Homicide: Life on the Street	Alex Robey	2 episodes
1997	The Practice	D.A. Harvey Welk	3 episodes
1998–1999	Soldier of Fortune, Inc.	Nick Delvecchio	Main role, 16 episodes
1999–2004	Sex and the City	Steve Brady	Recurring role, 41 episodes
2002	Third Watch	Off. Benny Ross	2 episodes
2002	The King of Queens	Jake	1 episode
2004	The 4400	Carl Morrissey	1 episode
2004	Everwood	Chris Templeman	1 episode
2005	Ghost Whisperer	Mr. Dale	1 episode
2006	CSI: Crime Scene Investigation	Gavin McGill	1 episode
2008	NCIS	Ted Bankston	1 episode
2009	Cold Case	Nathan Kravet '88	1 episode
2009	ER	Detective Trent Mallory	1 episode
2010	Criminal Minds	Agent Russel Golldman	1 episode
2010	Castle	Peter Connelly	1 episode
2010	Justified	Arnold Pinter	2 Episodes
2011	Five	Lenny	Television film
2012–present	Chicago Fire	Christopher Herrmann	Main role, 292 episodes
2012	Liz & Dick	Ernest Lehman	Television film
2012	Law & Order: Special Victims Unit	Dr. Hal Brightman	1 episode
2014–present	Chicago P.D.	Christopher Herrmann	Recurring role, 14 Episodes
2015–present	Chicago Med	Christopher Herrmann	Recurring role, 13 Episodes
2017	Chicago Justice	Christopher Herrmann	3 Episodes
2021–2025	And Just Like That...	Steve Brady	Recurring role, 6 Episodes
