= Michael Patrick King =

American screenwriter (born 1954)

- Born: September 14, 1954 (age 71); Scranton, Pennsylvania, U.S.
- Occupations: Film/television producer, director, writer
- Years active: 1989–present

Michael Patrick King (born September 14, 1954) is an American director, writer, and producer. He is best known for directing and writing for Sex and the City, its film adaptations, and the follow-up series And Just Like That..., and for co-creating the television comedies The Comeback, 2 Broke Girls, and AJ and the Queen.

== Life and career ==
King was born to a Roman Catholic Irish American family in Scranton, Pennsylvania. He attended Mercyhurst University in Erie, Pennsylvania, for three years.

In 1975, King moved to New York, did stand-up comedy, and wrote plays. He also was a member of a comedy improv group called The Broadway Local which mostly performed at Manhattan Punch Line Theatre. They were considered to be the in-house Improv group there.

He eventually moved to Los Angeles, where he found work writing for the television series Murphy Brown, and was nominated for several Emmys. He wrote for broadcast shows Will & Grace, Good Advice, and Cybill. He has an acting role on the HBO special Larry David: Curb Your Enthusiasm as Larry David's publicist.

He may be best known for his work on the HBO series Sex and the City, which was created by Darren Star. King wrote all the season premieres and finales of Sex and the City (except its pilot, written by Star, and the fifth-season finale, which King co-wrote with Cindy Chupack). He directed the show's film adaptation, and its follow-up, Sex and the City 2. He later created the HBO show The Comeback. He is featured on The Other Network Writers Room, an audio series for aspiring comedy writers. In 2008, his production company signed a deal with DreamWorks.

He is gay, and lives in Greenwich Village. He owns Arcade Productions, a production company.

== Filmography ==
Year	Title	Credit	Role	Notes
1989	The Sweet Life	Writer and producer		
1990	My Talk Show	Writer and actor	Guest Star	
1990	How to Be Louise	Actor	The Agent	
1991	Hi Honey, I'm Home!	Writer		
1991–1993	Murphy Brown	Writer and producer		10 episodes
1994	Good Advice	Director, writer, and executive producer		3 episodes
1994	The 5 Mrs. Buchanans	Writer and creative consultant		3 episodes
1996	Cybill	Writer and executive producer		8 episodes
1997	Temporarily Yours	Creator and writer		7 episodes
1998–1999	Will & Grace	Writer and consulting producer		6 episodes
1998–2004	Sex and the City	Director, writer, executive producer, and actor	Mental Patient (uncredited)	93 episodes
1999	Larry David: Curb Your Enthusiasm	Actor	HBO Publicist	
2001	55 Mercer Street	Writer		
2005, 2014, 2026	The Comeback	Co-creator, director, writer, and executive producer		29 episodes
2008	Sex and the City	Director, writer, and producer		
2010	Sex and the City 2	Director, writer, and producer		
2011–2017	2 Broke Girls	Creator, director, writer, and executive producer		Directed 5 episodes
2011	A Mann's World	Director, writer, and executive producer		TV movie
2020	AJ and the Queen	Creator, director, writer, and executive producer		10 episodes
2021–2025	And Just Like That...	Director, writer, and executive producer		33 episodes

== See also ==
- LGBT culture in New York City
- List of LGBT people from New York City
- NYC Pride March
