= John Melfi =

American film producer

John P. Melfi is a United States–based television and movie producer noted for his work on Sex and the City, Rome, Nurse Jackie, House of Cards, and And Just Like That.... Melfi has been nominated for Primetime Emmy Awards eight times between 1998 and 2013, and won twice. He was born on September 3, 1964 in Philadelphia, PA.
