= One Fifth Avenue =

One Fifth Avenue may refer to:

- One Fifth Avenue (novel), a 2008 novel by Candace Bushnell
- One Fifth Avenue (Manhattan), a residential skyscraper in the Washington Square area of Greenwich Village
