= Charlotte York =

Fictional character from American TV series Sex and the City

- Kristin Davis as Charlotte York
- First appearance: Print: "Talking Dirty at Mortimers" (1995) (The New York Observer); Television: Sex and the City (1998)
- Last appearance: "Party of One" (2025) (And Just Like That...)
- Created by: Candace Bushnell
- Portrayed by: Kristin Davis
- Duration: 1998–2004; 2008; 2010; 2021–2025

In-universe information
- Aliases: Charlotte York Goldenblatt (married name); Charlotte York MacDougal (former married name)
- Nickname: Char
- Gender: Female
- Occupation: Art dealer Former: Housewife
- Family: Sandra Whitehead "Muffin" York (mother); Stephen Foster York (father); Wesley York (brother); Lesley York (former sister-in-law); Bunny MacDougal (former mother-in-law); Mr. MacDougal (former father-in-law, deceased); Patty MacDougal (former sister-in-law); Charles MacDougal (former brother-in-law); Judith Goldenblatt (mother-in-law, deceased); Harold Goldenblatt (father-in-law)
- Spouses: Trey MacDougal (m. 2000; div. 2002) Harry Goldenblatt (m. 2003)
- Children: Lily Goldenblatt (adoptive daughter with Harry); Rose “Rock” Goldenblatt (child with Harry)
- Religion: Episcopalian, later converts to Judaism
- Nationality: American
- Birthday: January 23

Charlotte York (later Charlotte York MacDougal and Charlotte York Goldenblatt) is a fictional character in the Sex and the City media franchise. She is one of the four central characters in the HBO television series Sex and the City, its subsequent films (Sex and the City and Sex and the City 2), and the sequel series And Just Like That.... The character is portrayed by actress Kristin Davis, who received two Screen Actors Guild Awards as part of the show's ensemble cast.

Charlotte is depicted as the most conservative and traditionally minded member of the core friend group. She prioritizes emotional connection over physical intimacy, although her romantic and sexual relationships—including her first marriage—indicate that physical desire remains important to her. Idealistic and goal-oriented, Charlotte is portrayed as being in search of her "knight in shining armor" and often references conventional dating philosophies, such as those found in The Rules. She frequently expresses disapproval of the more sexually liberated behaviors of her friends, particularly those of Samantha Jones.

== Character information ==
Charlotte York first appeared as a recurring character, an English journalist, in Candace Bushnell's newspaper column "Sex and the City". She was a friend of Carrie Bradshaw, Bushnell's semi-autobiographical alter ego.

In the television adaptation, Charlotte is portrayed as the daughter of Dr. Stephen Foster York and Sandra Whitehead "Muffin" York. She comes from a wealthy, upper-class background in Connecticut and works as an art dealer at a Manhattan gallery. A self-described WASP, Charlotte is a graduate of Smith College, where she earned a Bachelor of Arts degree in Art History with a minor in Finance. During her time at Smith, she lived in Haven-Wesley House and was active in the College Republicans and a fictionalized version of Kappa Kappa Gamma sorority, although in real life Smith College does not have sororities.

== Marriages ==
=== Trey MacDougal ===
Trey MacDougal (Kyle MacLachlan) is a successful physician from a wealthy, upper-class family of Scottish heritage who becomes Charlotte's first husband. The two meet when Charlotte falls in the street and is nearly struck by a taxi carrying Trey, who exits the vehicle to help her. Their romantic encounter quickly leads to a relationship, and despite not being a virgin, Charlotte decides to abstain from sex until marriage. After only a month of dating, Trey proposes, and Charlotte accepts.

On the night before their wedding, an intoxicated Charlotte visits Trey. They attempt to have sex, only for her to discover that he suffers from erectile dysfunction. Though uncertain, she goes through with the wedding following reassurance from Carrie. On their honeymoon, they are unable to consummate the marriage, leading to emotional and sexual strain. The couple later enters therapy, where Trey is diagnosed with a Madonna–whore complex. Though they make some progress, Trey ultimately suggests that emotional compatibility is more important than physical intimacy, which frustrates Charlotte.

The relationship deteriorates further, culminating in Charlotte impulsively kissing the family’s gardener at their estate. Trey is hurt by the act but acknowledges his own failings, and they agree to separate. After Charlotte moves out, Trey becomes more sexually interested in her, and they begin a renewed physical relationship, engaging in spontaneous encounters. Charlotte challenges Trey to commit to a full reconciliation, which leads to their reunion and an improved sex life. They soon begin trying to conceive.

Struggles with infertility lead Charlotte to explore in vitro fertilization and adoption, but Trey expresses reluctance. Tensions escalate when Trey’s mother, Bunny MacDougal, disapproves of international adoption, leading to a public argument. Trey later informs Charlotte that he no longer wishes to have children, preferring a simpler life. Charlotte is devastated and attempts to suppress her disappointment, but the marriage grows increasingly strained. Trey moves into a separate bedroom, and the couple reaches an unspoken acknowledgment of their impending divorce.

As a final gesture, Trey agrees to appear with Charlotte in a House & Garden photo shoot featuring their newly redecorated Park Avenue apartment on the Upper East Side. He ultimately grants Charlotte ownership of the apartment. Though his mother attempts to contest this during the divorce proceedings, Trey sends a telegram from Scotland instructing Bunny to cease her interference and to give Charlotte whatever she wants.

=== Harry Goldenblatt ===
Harry Goldenblatt (Evan Handler) is introduced as Charlotte's divorce attorney during her separation from Trey MacDougal. Initially chosen because Charlotte believes she will not be distracted by his appearance—especially compared to his more conventionally attractive colleague—Harry eventually expresses romantic interest in her. Although Charlotte is initially put off by Harry’s physical appearance and somewhat unrefined manners, she is surprised by their strong sexual compatibility and begins a physical relationship with him.

Despite her original intention to keep the relationship casual, Charlotte develops emotional feelings for Harry, who is portrayed as kind, intelligent, and deeply devoted to her. At first, she attempts to mold him into her ideal partner but eventually accepts and falls in love with him as he is. Their relationship is tested when Harry reveals he made a promise to his late mother to marry within the Jewish faith. Charlotte decides to convert from Episcopalianism to Judaism, enthusiastically immersing herself in the process.

Conflict arises when Charlotte, frustrated that Harry has not proposed, confronts him and implies that he is fortunate to be with someone like her. Offended, Harry ends the relationship. Weeks later, the two reunite at a singles’ event at the synagogue, where Charlotte admits her mistakes and declares that she wants to be with him regardless of whether they marry. Harry responds by proposing, and they marry soon after.

The couple begins trying to conceive, but Charlotte encounters fertility issues similar to those in her previous marriage. They pursue adoption, and in the series finale, it is revealed that their application to adopt a baby girl from China has been approved.

In Sex and the City (2008), Charlotte and Harry are happily raising their adopted daughter, Lily. Charlotte unexpectedly becomes pregnant and gives birth to a second daughter, Rose. In Sex and the City 2 (2010), Charlotte briefly suspects Harry of having an affair with their attractive nanny, but her concerns prove unfounded.

In And Just Like That..., Charlotte and Harry remain happily married and are raising their now-teenage children in New York City. Charlotte’s friends are surprised to learn that she and Harry maintain an active sex life. When their younger child comes out as nonbinary and adopts the name "Rock," both parents are portrayed as supportive and affirming.

== Sex and the City: The Movie ==
In Sex and the City: The Movie (2008), Charlotte is shown living a contented life in New York City with her husband, Harry and their adopted daughter, Lily. When Carrie’s wedding to Mr. Big falls apart, Charlotte joins Carrie, along with Samantha and Miranda, on what was intended to be Carrie’s honeymoon in Mexico. During the trip, Charlotte avoids consuming local food, relying solely on her own provisions. However, this diet made up exclusively of pudding from Poughkeepsie eventually causes her to become ill with gastrointestinal distress.

Despite previously believing she could not conceive, Charlotte later learns she is unexpectedly pregnant, a discovery that brings her immense joy. She expresses a mixture of happiness and anxiety, remarking that she feels “so happy, she’s terrified.” The film also reveals that Charlotte had always believed Carrie and Big were meant to be together. When she later sees Big on the street, she confronts him, declaring, “I curse the day you were born.” The stress of the encounter sends her into labor. Big takes her to the hospital, where she gives birth to a daughter named Rose. The film concludes with Charlotte, Harry, and their two daughters living happily together.

== Sex and the City 2 ==
In Sex and the City 2 (2010), Charlotte is portrayed as a wealthy stay-at-home mother of two young daughters, with full-time, live-in domestic help. Despite her privileged lifestyle, she experiences significant stress related to motherhood and begins to doubt her ability to be a good parent. Her anxieties are compounded by suspicions that her husband, Harry, may be having an affair with their attractive nanny, Erin.

Charlotte joins her friends on a luxury trip to Abu Dhabi but remains unable to fully relax or disconnect from the pressures of parenting. Her concerns about infidelity are alleviated when it is revealed that Erin is a lesbian. Later, during a private conversation with Miranda in their hotel suite, Charlotte opens up about the emotional challenges of motherhood. Miranda reassures her, helping to ease her self-doubt. Following the trip, Charlotte occasionally uses Carrie’s old apartment as a personal retreat to take short breaks from her family responsibilities.

== Appearances in other media ==
The MTV Movie Awards 2000, which was hosted by Sarah Jessica Parker, featured a skit entitled Sex and The Matrix. During the skit, Charlotte appears alongside Samantha and Miranda listening to Carrie tell them about her date with Neo (played by Jimmy Fallon). Her date mimics the opening events of The Matrix movie, with Carrie waking up in the real world after taking the red pill (mistakenly believing it to be recreational drugs), but later returning to the simulated Manhattan after complaining about "wearing a potato sack" and "having an outlet in the back of my head".
