= Lipstick Jungle =

Lipstick Jungle may refer to:

- Lipstick Jungle (novel), a novel by Candace Bushnell
- Lipstick Jungle (TV series), an American drama series based on the novel
- A song by Newton Faulkner from the album Rebuilt by Humans
