= Killing Monica =

2013 novel by Candace Bushnell

- Hardcover edition
- Author: Candace Bushnell
- Language: English
- Subject: Relationship with pop-culture
- Genre: Chick-lit
- Publisher: Grand Central Publishing
- Publication date: June 23, 2015
- Publication place: United States
- Media type: Print (hardcover)
- Pages: 311 (first edition)
- ISBN: 978-0-446-55790-0
- OCLC: 1108718336
- Dewey Decimal: 813/.54
- LC Class: PS3552.U8229 K55 2015
- Preceded by: Summer and the City (2011)
- Followed by: Is There Still Sex in the City? (2019)

Killing Monica is a novel written by American author Candace Bushnell. It was first released as a hardcover on June 23, 2015. Bushnell's publisher, the Hachette Book Group, describes its central character, Pandy "PJ" Wallis, as "a renowned writer whose novels about a young woman making her way in Manhattan have spawned a series of blockbuster films."

== Synopsis ==
A champagne-drinking New York novelist named Pandy Wallis has found success through writing a series of books about her alter ego, Monica. The books have been adapted into films starring an actress named Sondra-Beth Schnowzer. Now, newly divorced, Pandy wants to write serious fiction about one of her ancestors instead. The plot of the novel combines flashbacks of her friendship with Sondra-Beth and failed marriage, with her quest to kill off her character Monica.

== Characters ==
- Pandy PJ James Wallis – The main character, a writer.
- Sondra-Beth Schnowzer - The bitchy actress with whom Pandy was once friends.
- Henry - Pandy's long-suffering and devoted literary agent.
- Monica - A Carrie Bradshaw-style fictional character.

== Reception ==
The book was "critically reviled", according to New York Magazine. "The prose is both hyperbolic and repetitive," wrote Eliza Kennedy in The New York Times Book Review. "Characters never speak when they can screech, shriek or scream." Kennedy concluded: "The entire thing is capped by a cheap revelation that's supposed to make readers think, but only made this reader cringe."

Writing in The Washington Post, Bethanne Patrick called it "a sloppy story that doesn't hold together." In The Independent, Arifa Akbar said: "None of it, including the final, unconvincing plot twist, is particularly well-written." In the New York Daily News, Sherryl Connelly called Killing Monica "an unfunny farce" and "a book of bad taste." It also received negative reviews from Kirkus Reviews, Kirsty McLuckie in The Scotsman, Georgie Binks in the Toronto Star. and Publishers Weekly.
