= Sex and the City (newspaper column) =

Newspaper column by Candace Bushnell

- The logo for the Sex and the City column
- Type: Anthology/Chick lit
- Founder: Candace Bushnell
- Publisher: The New York Observer
- Founded: November 28, 1994
- Ceased publication: July 1, 1996
- Website: observer.com/author/candace-bushnell/

"Sex and the City" was a newspaper column written by Candace Bushnell for The New York Observer from 1994 to 1996. The column was based on her and her friends' lifestyles living in New York City in the 1990s. An anthology of Bushnell's columns was published as a book of the same name in 1996. The columns became the basis for the HBO television series Sex and the City, which led to the 2008 film of the same name, a 2010 sequel, and the HBO Max revival of the series And Just Like That....

== Newspaper column ==
Candace Bushnell was working as a freelance writer in New York City when her editor at The New York Observer offered her a column. She based it on her and her friends' experiences as single women in their thirties living in the city, "all of whom seemed to have had a never-ending series of freakish and horrifying experiences with men". The column's name, "Sex and the City", is a play on the 1962 advice book Sex and the Single Girl. "Sex and the City" first appeared in the Observer on November 28, 1994. The column became popular and readers would purchase the Observer solely for it. The column has been credited with creating the terms "toxic bachelors" and "serial daters". Bushnell originally wrote the column from her first-person perspective, but later invented the semi-autobiographical character of "Carrie" so her parents would not be aware that they were reading about her sex life.

=== Characters ===
The columns introduced several characters who were included in the television series:

- Carrie, "a journalist in her mid-30s", and conceived around the lifestyle of "balancing small paychecks with access to glamour and wealth". Carrie had no last name until the television series.
- Mr. Big, a businessman and recurring love interest of Carrie. Mr. Big was based on Ron Galotti, the former publisher of GQ and Talk, whom Bushnell had dated.
- Samantha Jones, a "40-ish movie producer" known for dating a multitude of younger men. Bushnell based the character on a friend she described as "kind of an expert on men and dating".
- Charlotte York, an English journalist and friend of Carrie.
- Miranda Hobbes, a cable television executive and friend of Carrie.
- Stanford Blatch, a gay screenwriter and friend of Carrie. Stanford was based on Bushnell's friend Clifford Streit.
- Skipper Johnston, a Website creator and male friend of Carrie who appeared early in the television series.
- Barkley, a 25-year-old artist whom Carrie dates, appearing in one episode of the series.

== Book ==
Sex and the City
- First American edition cover
- Author: Candace Bushnell
- Language: English
- Genre: Anthology/Chick lit
- Publisher: Atlantic Monthly Press; Warner Books (reissues)
- Publication date: August 12, 1996
- Publication place: United States
- Media type: Print (hardback & paperback)
- ISBN: 0-446-61768-7
- OCLC: 70689339

A book anthology of Bushnell's columns, Sex and the City, was published in 1996. It primarily focuses on the columns centered around Carrie, and does not include most of Bushnell's early first-person columns or those centered around other characters. It was re-published in 2001, 2006, and in 2008 as a tenth anniversary tie-in edition for the film Sex and the City.

== See also ==
- The Carrie Diaries, a 2010 young adult prequel novel by Bushnell featuring the characters from Sex and the City
- Summer and the City, a 2011 young adult prequel novel by Bushnell featuring the characters from Sex and the City
- Is There Still Sex in the City?, a 2019 novel by Bushnell, though unrelated to the Sex and the City franchise
