= Lipstick Jungle (novel) =

2005 novel by Candace Bushnell

- First edition
- Author: Candace Bushnell
- Language: English
- Genre: Chick-lit
- Publisher: Hyperion
- Publication date: September 6, 2005
- Publication place: United States
- Media type: Print
- Pages: 368 pages
- ISBN: 978-0-7868-6819-3

Lipstick Jungle is a novel written by New York writer and socialite Candace Bushnell, that weaves the stories of Nico Reilly, Wendy Healy, and Victory Ford, who are numbers 8, 12, and 17 on the New York Post's list of New York's 50 Most Powerful Women. The premise appears to tread similar ground to Bushnell's famed Sex and the City, following the lives of three New York career women; however, in this book the women are a little older, richer, and more powerful.

== Characters ==
Wendy Healy
Movie industry president of Parador Pictures (pun on Paramount Pictures) with marriage difficulties and a tough competitor.
Nico Reilly
The glamorous editor-in-chief of Bonfire Magazine, a pop-culture bible for show-biz, fashion, and politics (loosely based on Entertainment Weekly).
Victory Ford
Fashion designer.

== TV Adaptation ==
A television series was created based on the book, starring Brooke Shields as Wendy Healy, Lindsay Price as Victory Ford, and Kim Raver as Nico Reilly. A total of twenty episodes aired on NBC from February 7, 2008 through January 9, 2009.
