= And Just Like That... =

American comedy drama television series

- Genre: Romantic comedy; Comedy drama; Sex comedy
- Created by: Darren Star
- Based on: Sex and the City by Candace Bushnell
- Developed by: Michael Patrick King
- Starring: Sarah Jessica Parker; Cynthia Nixon; Kristin Davis; Mario Cantone; David Eigenberg; Willie Garson; Evan Handler; Sara Ramirez; Chris Noth; Sarita Choudhury; Cathy Ang; Niall Cunningham; Chris Jackson; Nicole Ari Parker; Alexa Swinton; Karen Pittman; John Corbett; Dolly Wells; Sebastiano Pigazzi
- Music by: Aaron Zigman
- Country of origin: United States
- Original language: English
- No. of seasons: 3
- No. of episodes: 33

Production
- Executive producers: Michael Patrick King; Sarah Jessica Parker; John Melfi; Kristin Davis; Cynthia Nixon; Julie Rottenberg; Elisa Zuritsky; Susan Fales-Hill
- Producer: Teddy Au
- Cinematography: Tim Norman; Wylda Bayrón; Andrei Schwartz
- Editors: Michael Berenbaum; Sheri Bylander; Allyson C. Johnson
- Camera setup: Single-camera
- Running time: 37–44 minutes
- Production companies: Michael Patrick King Productions; HBO Entertainment; Pretty Matches Productions; Rialto Films

Original release
- Network: HBO Max
- Release: December 9, 2021 – February 3, 2022
- Network: Max
- Release: June 22, 2023 – July 3, 2025
- Network: HBO Max
- Release: July 10 – August 14, 2025

Related
- Sex and the City; The Carrie Diaries

And Just Like That... is an American comedy drama television series developed by Michael Patrick King for HBO Max. It is a revival and a sequel of the HBO television series Sex and the City created by Darren Star, which is based on Candace Bushnell's newspaper column and 1996 book anthology of the same title.

Development for the series began in December 2020, following the cancellation of a third film adaptation. It was given a straight-to-series order in January 2021 by HBO Max. Casting announcements were made throughout 2021 and filming started in July 2021 in New York City. And Just Like That... premiered on HBO Max on December 9, 2021.

The first season was billed as a one-off miniseries, and its finale was released on February 3, 2022. However, a second season was announced in March 2022; it premiered on June 22, 2023. In August 2023, the series was renewed for a third season which premiered on May 29, 2025. The final episode of the series aired on August 14, 2025 after the third season was announced to be its last the same month, expanding the season from 10 to 12 episodes, and therefore concluding the Sex and the City franchise.

The series received mixed to negative reviews, with many critics deeming it unnecessary and inferior to the original Sex and the City series.

== Overview ==
Set 11 years after the events of the 2010 film Sex and the City 2, the women of Sex and the City make their transition from a life of freedom and friendship in their 30s to a more complicated reality of life and friendship in their 50s.

== Cast and characters ==
=== Main ===
- Sarah Jessica Parker as Carrie Bradshaw / Preston
- Cynthia Nixon as Miranda Hobbes
- Kristin Davis as Charlotte York Goldenblatt
- Mario Cantone as Anthony Marentino
- David Eigenberg (Note: Eigenberg is only credited as "Starring" in select episodes.) as Steve Brady
- Willie Garson (Note: Garson is only credited as "Starring" in the first three episodes of the first season.) as Stanford Blatch (season 1)
- Evan Handler as Harry Goldenblatt
- Sara Ramirez as Che Diaz (seasons 1–2)
- Chris Noth (Note: Noth is only credited as "Starring" in the first two episodes of the first season. He was also set to appear in the tenth episode, but was edited out following sexual assault allegations that were brought against him.) as Mr. Big / John James Preston (season 1)
- Sarita Choudhury (Note: Choudhury is credited as "Starring" from episode four of the first season onwards.) as Seema Patel
- Cathy Ang as Lily Goldenblatt (seasons 2–3; recurring season 1)
- Niall Cunningham as Brady Hobbes (seasons 2–3; recurring season 1)
- Chris Jackson as Herbert Wexley (seasons 2–3; recurring season 1)
- Nicole Ari Parker as Lisa Todd Wexley (seasons 2–3; recurring season 1)
- Alexa Swinton as Rose "Rock" Goldenblatt (seasons 2–3; recurring season 1)
- Karen Pittman as Dr. Nya Wallace (season 2; recurring season 1)
- John Corbett (Note: Corbett is credited as "Starring" from episode seven of the second season onwards.) as Aidan Shaw (seasons 2–3)
- Dolly Wells as Joy (season 3; guest season 2)
- Sebastiano Pigazzi as Giuseppe (season 3; recurring season 2)

=== Recurring ===
- Bobby Lee as Jackie Nee (seasons 1–2)
- LeRoy McClain as Andre Rashad Wallace
- Cree Cicchino as Luisa Torres (season 1)
- Pat Bowie as Eunice Wexley
- Elijah Jacob as Herbert Wexley Jr.
- Alexander Bello as Henry Wexley
- Ellie Reine as Gabrielle "Gabby" Wexley
- Ivan Hernandez as Franklyn Silvias (seasons 1–2)
- Katerina Tannenbaum as Lisette Alee
- William Abadie as Zed (seasons 1–2)
- Victor Garber as Mark Kasabian (seasons 2–3)
- Patricia Black as Judy (season 2)
- Armin Amiri as Ravi Gordi (seasons 2–3)
- Logan Marshall-Green as Adam Karma (season 3)
- Mehcad Brooks as Marion Odin (season 3)
- Jonathan Cake as Duncan Reeves (season 3)

=== Guest ===
- Brenda Vaccaro as Gloria Marquette (season 1)
- Frank Wood as Norman (season 1)
- Jonathan Groff as Dr. Paul David (season 1)
- Jon Tenney as Peter (season 1)
- Hari Nef as Rabbi Jen (season 1)
- Gary Dourdan as Toussaint Feldman (season 2)
- Oliver Hudson as Lyle (season 2)
- Tony Danza as himself (season 2)
- Gloria Steinem as herself (season 2)
- Billy Dee Williams as Lawerence Todd (season 2)
- Peter Hermann as George Campbell (season 2)
- Armando Riesco as Paul Bennett (season 2)
- Julie White as Maddie Thomas (season 2)
- Rachel Dratch as Kerry Moore (season 2)
- Drew Barrymore as herself (season 2)
- Miriam Shor as Amelia Carcy (season 2)
- John Glover as Elliot (seasons 2–3)
- Evelyn Howe as Raina (season 2)
- Rosemarie DeWitt as Kathy (seasons 2–3)
- Alex Lugo as Toby (season 2)
- Ross Mathews as himself (season 2)
- Ryan Serhant as himself (seasons 2–3)
- Sam Smith as themself (season 2)
- André De Shields as Gene (season 2)
- Rosie O'Donnell as Mary (season 3)
- Kristen Schaal as Lois Fingerhood (season 3)
- Jason Schmidt as Tate Shaw (season 3)
- Corbin Drew Ross as Homer Shaw (season 3)
- Logan Souza as Wyatt Shaw (season 3)
- Jenifer Lewis as Lucille Highwater (season 3)
- Patti LuPone as Dottoressa Gianna "Gia" Amato (season 3)
- Susie Essman as Rhonda (season 3)
- Jackie Hoffman as local baker (season 3)

=== Guest characters from Sex and the City ===
- Julie Halston as Bitsy von Muffling
- Molly Price as Susan Sharon (season 1)
- Bridget Moynahan as Natasha Naginsky-Mills (season 1)
- Candice Bergen as Enid Frick (season 2)
- Kim Cattrall as Samantha Jones (season 2)
- Stephanie Cannon as Linda (season 3)
- Andy Cohen as Daniel (season 3)

== Episodes ==
=== Series overview ===
Season	Episodes		Originally released		
Season	Episodes		First released	Last released	Network
1	10		December 9, 2021	February 3, 2022	HBO Max
2	11		June 22, 2023	August 24, 2023	Max
3	12	6	May 29, 2025	July 3, 2025	Max
3	12	6	July 10, 2025	August 14, 2025	HBO Max

=== Season 1 (2021–22) ===
No. overall	No. in season	Title	Directed by	Written by	Original release date
1	1	"Hello It's Me"	Michael Patrick King	Michael Patrick King	December 9, 2021
Carrie, Charlotte, and Miranda, now in their mid-50s, remain best friends. Perpetually squabbling couple Stanford and Anthony are still close to them, though Samantha has fallen out with Carrie and moved to London. Happily married to John "Big" Preston, Carrie participates on an LGBTQ-friendly, sex-oriented podcast hosted by Che Diaz, a Mexican-American, non-binary stand-up comic. Carrie finds certain graphic topics uncomfortable, but Che warns she must engage more. Miranda, studying for a Master's degree, nervously blunders meeting Professor Nya Wallace, an African-American woman. Also, Miranda and Steve, having reluctantly allowed teen son, Brady, and girlfriend, Luisa to have sleepovers, now endure their noisy sex. Continually stressed, Miranda copes with alcohol. Charlotte and Harry dote on their teenage daughters: musically accomplished Lily and independent-minded Rose. While Carrie attends Lily's piano recital, John suffers a fatal heart attack following his Peloton workout. When Carrie returns home, John dies in her arms.
2	2	"Little Black Dress"	Michael Patrick King	Michael Patrick King	December 9, 2021
Carrie chooses a non-traditional venue for John's funeral. Samantha sends flowers, but Carrie's thank-you text goes unanswered. John's mature secretary, Gloria, becomes emotional during the service, and Carrie's old friend, Susan-Sharon, makes vague references to some long-forgotten feud. Bitsy von Muffling, now widowed, also attends. Miranda chastises Che for sharing marijuana with Brady at the reception, unaware Che is Carrie's podcast boss. A distraught Charlotte feels responsible for John's death, having pushed Carrie to attend Lily's recital while John stayed home. Carrie assures Charlotte she is blameless. Carrie is emotionally unprepared when John's ashes are delivered to their condo. Miranda overcomes her awkwardness with Professor Wallace after preventing a mugging. Miranda becomes increasingly dependent on alcohol.
3	3	"When in Rome..."	Michael Patrick King	Julie Rottenberg & Elisa Zuritsky	December 16, 2021
Carrie rejoins the podcast. Upon learning John left ex-wife Natasha one million dollars, Carrie suspects an affair, but Natasha says she never saw John after their divorce; she declines the bequest, though Carrie believes John was apologizing for marrying Natasha. Stanford claims Charlotte does not consider him part of the girls' inner circle. Charlotte seeks out Anthony, who now runs a bakery business from a time-share kitchen, for advice after twelve-year-old Rose admits to not feeling like a girl. Charlotte is concerned after finding empty mini-liquor bottles in Miranda's backpack. Miranda confides to Charlotte that she and Steve have a sexless marriage. Carrie, Charlotte, and Miranda attend Che's comedy act. Che's bit about making personal changes resonates with Miranda, who returns to the club to seek out Che. Meanwhile, Carrie heads home, but rather than the Fifth Avenue residence, she walks to her old apartment.
4	4	"Some of My Best Friends"	Gillian Robespierre	Keli Goff	December 23, 2021
When Carrie decides to sell her condo, realtor Seema Patel stages it in beige tones, further depressing Carrie. Carrie stores John's ashes at her old apartment until figuring out where he would want to be. To diversify her and Harry's social circle, Charlotte cultivates a friendship with Lisa and Herbert Wexley, a socially prominent African-American couple. Miranda and Nya bond while dining out together. Nya shares her struggle to become pregnant via IVF, while Miranda reflects on the pros and cons of motherhood. Stanford, now a talent agent, is in Japan with his sole client, Ashley, a popular TikTok singer touring there. Anthony says Stanford wants a divorce.
5	5	"Tragically Hip"	Gillian Robespierre	Samantha Irby	December 30, 2021
Charlotte coordinates Carrie's post-hip surgery care. During a Zoom meeting with her school mom-friends, Charlotte learns that daughter Rose is non-binary and goes by "Rock", confusing Harry and Charlotte. While recuperating, Carrie does the podcast from home. Che stops by while Carrie is sleeping; they and Miranda do tequila shots in the kitchen and become sexual. Carrie awakens and sees their reflections in the full-length mirror. After Che leaves, Carrie angrily confronts Miranda, who admits her life and marriage are unhappy. Later, Miranda, who believed Charlotte anonymously sent her a book about quitting drinking, discovers she drunk-ordered it from Amazon. She dumps out all her liquor. Three months later, Carrie is fully recovered and back in high heels.
6	6	"Diwali"	Cynthia Nixon	Rachna Fruchbom	January 6, 2022
To start anew, Carrie buys an ultra-modern downtown apartment. Charlotte is dismayed when both Lily and Rock want to update their shared bedroom to reflect each girl's individual taste and age. Nya recruits Miranda for a student project to renovate old apartment buildings into displaced women's shelters. Seema invites Carrie to her family's Diwali celebration. To quell her parents' constant pressure to be married, Seema falsely claims she is dating a Doctors Without Borders physician who frequently travels. Carrie accompanies Anthony for his plastic surgery consultation, then considers having work done. Charlotte praises Miranda for quitting drinking but questions her about Che, whom Miranda constantly fantasizes about. Carrie moves back to her old apartment.
7	7	"Sex and the Widow"	Anu Valia	Julie Rottenberg & Elisa Zuritsky	January 13, 2022
Carrie's editor, Amanda, suggests adding a hopeful ending to Carrie's new book chronicling her widowhood. To that purpose, Carrie has a computer date with Peter, a handsome widower. The evening starts awkwardly, loosens up with alcohol, and ends in humiliation when both drunkenly vomit in the street. Miranda's DMs to Che go unanswered. Later, Miranda and Steve's tepid attempt at sex quickly fizzles. Charlotte becomes overly competitive during her and Harry's tennis doubles match with Lisa and Herbert. After multiple failed IVF attempts, Nya and Andre agree to try conceiving naturally. Charlotte helps Lisa organize a school fundraising auction. A lunch date with Carrie is auctioned off without any bids. An embarrassed Carrie bids on herself, then is outbid by Peter, her computer date who teaches at the school. At the auction, Miranda runs into Che, who apologizes for missing Miranda's DMs. After they have sex, Miranda says she loves Che.
8	8	"Bewitched, Bothered, and Bewildered"	Anu Valia	Rachna Fruchbom	January 20, 2022
Che, believing Miranda was in an "open marriage", ends their affair. Lily walks in on Charlotte and Harry having oral sex. Charlotte awkwardly claims to be checking Harry for cancer, scaring Lily who now fears her father is ill. Carrie's young downstairs neighbor, Lisette, a jewelry designer, apologizes for her loud social gatherings on the outer stoop that woke Carrie at night. Charlotte talks frankly with Lily after discovering semi-provocative selfies on her Instagram. Miranda declares she loves Che, promising to end her marriage. Che reciprocates Miranda's feelings but warns it would be a non-traditional relationship. Miranda asks Steve for a divorce, then flies to Cleveland to surprise Che.
9	9	"No Strings Attached"	Nisha Ganatra	Michael Patrick King and Julie Rottenberg & Elisa Zuritsky	January 27, 2022
Miranda recruits Carrie and Charlotte to help renovate an old hotel into a women's shelter. Rock resists having a Bat Mitzvah. Anthony brings new friend Justin to Charlotte and Harry's for dinner, then orders him out after he claims the Holocaust was a hoax. Lily asks Charlotte how to use tampons prior to a Hampton pool party. Che and Miranda reach a mutual understanding. Carrie hopes Steve finds love again after he claims he will always feel married to Miranda. Nya and Andre reach an impasse over having children. While sitting out the shelter work party, Seema meets Zed, an attractive nightclub owner. Carrie, wearing both her and John's wedding rings, panics after nearly losing John's down a sink drain. She later puts both rings away and texts Peter about a redo date.
10	10	"Seeing the Light"	Nisha Ganatra	Michael Patrick King and Julie Rottenberg & Elisa Zuritsky	February 3, 2022
Carrie and Peter's redo date amicably ends prematurely, with neither ready to start dating. Seema spends a passionate three days with Zed. Miranda declines a prestigious internship to instead go to Los Angeles with Che, who is cast in a TV pilot. Nya and Andre separate. Che's producer, Franklyn, offers Carrie her own podcast. A transgender rabbi has agreed to officiate Rock's "They Mitzvah" ceremony, but Rock refuses to participate, claiming not to identify with any group, religion, gender, or anything else. Charlotte, a Jewish convert who never had a Bat Mitzvah, takes Rock's place. Miranda leaves for L.A. while Brady and Luisa depart for Europe. On the first anniversary of John's passing, Carrie, believing he wants to be in Paris, scatters his ashes in the Seine River. She texts Samantha, asking to meet up in London. Back in New York, Carrie's first Sex and the City podcast is a success; Carrie and Franklyn share a romantic kiss.

=== Season 2 (2023) ===
No. overall	No. in season	Title	Directed by	Written by	Original release date
11	1	"Met Cute"	Michael Patrick King	Michael Patrick King & Susan Fales-Hill	June 22, 2023
Carrie and her Sex and the City podcast producer, Franklyn, settle into an "every Thursday" hookup routine. Carrie juggles who to take to the Met Gala as her "plus one" and then has a fashion disaster when her custom-designed dress doesn't fit. She instead wears her Vivienne Westwood wedding dress. In L.A., Miranda attempts to keep busy while Che works long hours. Che, meanwhile, becomes withdrawn after being asked to lose weight for the TV pilot. Seema breaks up with Zed after learning he lives with his ex-wife, though he clarifies they have separate quarters. Nya, estranged from Andre, calls for a sexy FaceTime encounter, only to discover him with a woman he claims is only a musical collaborator. Carrie is uncomfortable when Franklyn invites her to a social event, preferring their relationship remain as is.
12	2	"The Real Deal"	Michael Patrick King	Susan Fales-Hill & Michael Patrick King	June 22, 2023
Carrie and producer Chloe clash over a podcast commercial. Lisa Wexley dreads her overbearing mother-in-law's impending visit. Lily sells her expensive designer dresses to buy an electric keyboard after Harry and Charlotte refused to get her one. Charlotte is upset but accepts her maturing daughter's changing priorities. Nya and Andre discuss reconciling, but Nya resists surrogacy to have children. Italian-American actor Tony Danza, cast as Che's father in the TV pilot, is uncomfortable playing a Hispanic character. Seema reconsiders breaking up with Zed until he asks her to invest $100,000 in a new club. When Miranda is stranded at the beach, Che sends Lyle, who Miranda learns is Che's husband. Che explains the two are still friends and just never got around to divorcing. When the production studio is sold, ending all podcasts, Carrie feels it may be time to move on from her Sex and the City identity. Carrie, unready for a steady relationship, amicably ends her relationship with Franklyn.
13	3	"Chapter Three"	Michael Patrick King	Julie Rottenberg & Elisa Zuritsky	June 29, 2023
While audio recording her latest book, Carrie finds the chapter about John's death too emotional to read. She subsequently feigns having COVID so a voice actor will replace her. A mugger steals Seema's vintage Birkin bag. Charlotte and Lisa are flattered to be on a male student's MILF list at their children's school. Che is dismayed with how their non-binary TV character is depicted. Lisa interviews Nya for a new documentary, after which Lisa's sound engineer asks Nya out. Bitsy Von Muffling offers Carrie advice about widowhood. Miranda considers a tattoo to reflect her new life, then chooses her initials "MH" to affirm who she always has been. A distraught Brady calls Miranda after Luisa dumps him in Europe. The call disrupts filming of Che's sitcom. Miranda tells Brady to fly home while she returns to New York City. Carrie comforts Lisette after a smash & grab robbery at her jewelry "pop-up" tent sale. Seema finds her beloved Birkin discarded on the street. Carrie finishes recording her audiobook. After mingling with Australian rugby players, Carrie contracts COVID.
14	4	"Alive!"	Michael Patrick King	Julie Rottenberg & Elisa Zuritsky	July 6, 2023
Carrie's former Vogue boss, Enid Frick, asks her to be a contributor for a new online publication for retired women. Carrie feels she is too young for that demographic, then learns that Enid only wants a $100,000 donation. Bitsy Von Muffling tries matching Carrie with a man who is dating Enid. Harry and Charlotte, and also Lisa and Herbert, send their children to summer camp. Charlotte helps Harry to strengthen his weakened pelvic floor muscles, which has affected his sexual performance. During family counseling, Brady wants Miranda and Steve to divorce so everyone can move on with their lives. Che is back in New York and sharing an apartment with their estranged husband, Lyle. Che is comfortable being intimate with both Lyle and Miranda, though Miranda is uneasy. Lisa and Herbert's 20th wedding anniversary party is a bust after Herbert fails to send the invites and Lisa forgets the cake. Charlotte receives a standing job offer from Mark Kasabian, a prominent New York art gallery owner.
15	5	"Trick or Treat"	Cynthia Nixon	Samantha Irby & Lucas Froehlich	July 13, 2023
Miranda shuttles back and forth between her home in Brooklyn and Che's Manhattan apartment. Their differing schedules mean neither gets a full night's sleep. Charlotte helps facilitate a large Halloween fundraising event. Seema and Carrie take Nya to a five-star hotel bar to meet eligible men. Nya meets Ian while Seema hooks up with a gin sales representative who suffers from erectile dysfunction. Carrie takes a biker named George to an urgent care clinic after causing him to fall off his bike. Charlotte is excited when Rock is offered a modeling job with Ralph Lauren, though Harry is skeptical. Nya offers to let a sleep-deprived Miranda use her spare room. Che is crestfallen after a focus group gives negative feedback regarding their non-binary character and TV pilot. Carrie and George's brief fling ends when Paul, George's business partner, complains that Carrie is disrupting their upcoming sales presentation.
16	6	"Bomb Cyclone"	Cynthia Nixon	Michael Patrick King & Rachel Palmer	July 20, 2023
Seema invites Carrie to share a summer rental house in the Hamptons. Miranda settles in at Nya's place while also spending time at Che's. Nya files for divorce from Andre. Herbert, running for city comptroller, wants Lisa to attend his campaign rally, which is scheduled the same time the MoMA is honoring her as a black filmmaker. Lily shocks Charlotte and Harry by casually announcing she is losing her virginity later that day. Carrie is the keynote speaker at WidowCon, a conference for bereaved women. Che, depressed over losing the TV pilot, accompanies Carrie to the event after Miranda insists Che stop moping at home. A severe snowstorm hits New York, impeding everyone's various events. Miranda and Steve mutually vent their feelings and agree to divorce, though Steve refuses to move out. Che and Miranda decide to end their strained relationship but remain friends. Carrie emails former fiancé, Aidan, who is now divorced and living in Virginia.
17	7	"February 14th"	Ry Russo-Young	Samantha Irby	July 27, 2023
Aidan and Carrie arrange to meet for dinner. Drew Barrymore invites Anthony and one of his Hot Fellas workers to appear on her talk show. Anthony panics when all his employees suddenly quit, but Charlotte recruits a last-minute replacement, a young Italian poet named Giuseppe. Che, needing an income, turns their apartment into an Airbnb and is offered their former job at a veterinary clinic. Lisa's parental patience is tested when son, Herbert Jr, pushes sexual boundaries. Seema and Carrie book joint massage appointments only to discover that all sessions are for Valentine's Day couples. Nya spends Valentine's Day at home, happily eating a chocolate soufflé. Feeling consumed by her children's lives, Charlotte accepts the position at the Mark Kasabian Gallery. Miranda meets Amelia, an audiobook reader that Miranda particularly admires for her Jane Austen series. Their date quickly devolves when Miranda realizes Amelia lives a far less romanticized life than she envisioned. Carrie and Aidan's reunion goes well until Aidan refuses to step inside Carrie's apartment, citing bad memories. They agree to meet up elsewhere in future.
18	8	"A Hundred Years Ago"	Ry Russo-Young	Michael Patrick King & Julie Rottenberg & Elisa Zuritsky	August 3, 2023
Carrie rents Che's Airbnb full-time for when Aidan visits. Carrie agrees to visit Aidan's Norfolk, Virginia, farm and meet his sons. Miranda's Human Rights Watch supervisor, Raina, assigns her more responsibility than the two younger interns, who have been there longer. Carrie wonders if she and John were a mistake. Charlotte starts her art gallery job but obsesses about overdressing her middle-aged body until meeting Lela, a casually attired, full-figured staff member. Upon learning that Giuseppe is gay, Anthony wants to fire him because he is irresistibly attracted. Giuseppe voluntarily quits so they can become involved. Seema cancels the Hampton summer house rental, not wanting to be the "third wheel" to Carrie and Aidan. Seema's business partner, Elliot, urges her to date Ravi Gordi, a film director looking for a temporary rental. Miranda hesitates to cover for Raina during her maternity leave, fearing a conflict with the other two interns; Raina insists she is the most qualified. Che and Seema meet Aidan, and Carrie leaves for Virginia.
19	9	"There Goes the Neighborhood"	Julie Rottenberg	Julie Rottenberg & Elisa Zuritsky	August 10, 2023
Carrie meets Aidan's three sons in Virginia, but the youngest, teenager Wyatt, is indifferent. Carrie and Aidan vacate Che's apartment after the building management serves a notice that the guest-stay limit has been exceeded. Seema and Ravi become romantically involved. Miranda wants Lily to encourage Brady to consider college. Harry thinks Charlotte's boss, Mark Kasabian, is romantically interested in her. Herbert is frustrated over Lisa constantly missing his campaign events due to overwork and exhaustion until learning she is pregnant. Nya's noisy sex sleepovers annoy Miranda. Nya, meanwhile, is despondent after seeing an Instagram photo of André and his pregnant girlfriend, Heidi. Che meets Toby, a potential romantic interest. Anthony thinks Giuseppe is using him to obtain a green card until discovering he has dual citizenship. Carrie decides to buy a new townhouse in Gramercy Park that Aidan is willing to stay in. Charlotte tells Miranda that she suspects Lily and Brady are having sex. Aidan's ex-wife Kathy reveals Wyatt is on the autism spectrum and asks Carrie to avoid writing anything about her sons and not hurt Aidan again.
20	10	"The Last Supper Part One: Appetizer"	Michael Patrick King	Michael Patrick King	August 17, 2023
Steve, partnering with Aidan, opens a Coney Island food stand. Miranda's boss, Raina, returns to work. After selling her apartment to Lisette, Carrie plans a gourmet farewell dinner there. Aidan refuses to attend, and Miranda also declines to avoid Che, then relents. Lisa's pregnancy conflicts with a possible PBS documentary until she suffers a miscarriage. Anthony and Giuseppe have generational differences. Seema panics after blurting out she loves Ravi during sex. After Andre sends an e-vite for his and Heidi's baby shower, Nya buys an expensive stroller so it will remind them of her when using it. Stanford is permanently staying in Japan to become a Shinto monk and gives all his possessions to Anthony. Che performs at a small Brooklyn club, unaware Miranda is in the audience, hearing unflattering jokes about her. Charlotte struggles balancing work and home life. Aidan acknowledges his previous mistakes with Carrie. Aidan rushes back to Virginia when Wyatt is injured in a car crash. Che persuades Carrie to adopt a kitten that she names "Shoe".
21	11	"The Last Supper Part Two: Entrée"	Michael Patrick King	Michael Patrick King	August 24, 2023
London fog derails Samantha's surprise visit for Carrie's "Last Supper". Miranda and Steve agree to be friends. Charlotte demands Harry be more involved in running their household. Nya is elected to the American Law Institute. Relationships become more defined during the farewell dinner: Anthony promises Giuseppe to drop his emotional and physical barriers. Lisa and Herbert move past Lisa's miscarriage. Che and Miranda establish a friendly understanding. Ravi's constant work-related phone calls bother Seema. Nya clicks with Toussaint Feldman, the Michelin chef preparing Carrie's dinner. The BBC interviews Miranda regarding a Human Rights issue. After, she and BBC producer Joy meet for a drink. Che and new friend Toby become romantic. After Wyatt crashed his father's truck while driving under the influence, Aidan says he and Carrie cannot be involved while his sons are still teenagers. Carrie agrees to a five-year relationship pause. Carrie and Seema visit Greece.

=== Season 3 (2025) ===
No. overall	No. in season	Title	Directed by	Written by	Original release date
22	1	"Outlook Good"	Michael Patrick King	Michael Patrick King	May 29, 2025
Carrie has moved into her luxurious and mostly unfurnished townhouse. Carrie and Charlotte accompany Miranda to a lesbian bar to help her meet women. Anthony criticizes Carrie and Aidan's long-distance arrangement, then apologizes for angering her. Miranda meets and spends the night with Mary, a virgin Canadian nun. When Mary continually texts wanting to meet up, Miranda gently ends the relationship. Seema breaks up with Ravi who is always too busy to make time for her. Lisa is frustrated when producers want the famous Michelle Obama included in her documentary about unsung black women. A hysterical woman in the park claims Charlotte's dog attacked hers. An overworked Lisa resents hosting an event for Herbert's city comptroller campaign. The security alarm in Carrie's townhouse continually goes off. After a long dry spell, Carrie starts writing again.
23	2	"The Rat Race"	Michael Patrick King	Julie Rottenberg & Elisa Zuritsky	June 5, 2025
Lisette gives Carrie a memento necklace representing her former apartment. Charlotte and Lisa wrangle an appointment with Lois Fingerhood, a sought-after Ivy League college admissions consultant, to help Lily and Herbert Jr. get into a top school. When Aidan makes a surprise visit, Carrie expresses frustration at being unable to share things with him. Aidan admits going overboard about having no communication and says Carrie can call or text anytime, then disappoints her by responding to a text with an emoji. Miranda and an attractive waitress are both hooked on a bisexual reality TV show. Miranda asks her out, but learns she is straight. Anthony is opening a Hot Fellas brick-and-mortar bakery/coffee shop. Seema's business partner Elliot hooks her up with a matchmaker who attempts to soften Seema's image. Miranda considers pursuing Joy, the BBC producer who is working in New York. Charlotte happens upon Lily kissing Diego, a New York City Ballet dancer. Lily and Herbert Jr. are traumatized by Lois Fingerhood's brutal consultation assessment. Carrie's courtyard is infested with rats. After the vermin and nearly all the bushes are removed, she hires Adam, an attractive landscaper, to redo the space.
24	3	"Carrie Golightly"	Michael Patrick King	Samantha Irby	June 12, 2025
Carrie accepts a speaking engagement in Virginia so she can visit Aidan. Aidan's ex-wife, Kathy, asks Carrie to procure Adderall for son Wyatt due to a shortage. Business for Anthony's new bakery/cafe booms after Giuseppe shows up in a Hot Fellas uniform. Lisa feels adrift after her documentary editor, Grace, accepts a job with famed director Steve McQueen. Charlotte is pulled between her home life and networking at non-stop after-work parties. Miranda asks Joy out on the pretense of needing work advice. Elliot is retiring and has sold his majority ownership to Ryan Serhant, prompting Seema to consider opening her own real estate firm. In Virginia with Seema, Carrie arranges to meet Aidan for a lunch. Carrie is disappointed she was not asked to stay over until Seema points out that Carrie never communicated to Aidan what she wanted. Aidan rescues Carrie and Seema after their rental car has a tire mishap. He invites Carrie to stay over but in the guest house, explaining his sons need advance notice regarding his plans.
25	4	"Apples to Apples"	Michael Patrick King	Michael Patrick King	June 19, 2025
Aidan's two oldest sons are glad to see Carrie, but Wyatt is sullen. Lisa worries that hiring male editor Marion Odin for her female-focused documentary is inappropriate. Herbert retreats to the guest room when Lisa starts talking loudly in her sleep. Harry's lascivious visiting father hits on the neighbor lady who is equally smitten. Lily's boyfriend Diego is polysexual and also dating a boy. Seema declines Ryan's job offer and is given one week to clear her office. After slightly mispronouncing a word during a live BBC broadcast, Miranda is humiliated when she becomes an instant viral meme. While housesitting for Carrie, Miranda invites the BBC crew over for a drink, culminating in Miranda and Joy spending the night together. Carrie learns that Aidan and Kathy strongly disagree over Wyatt taking Adderall. Wyatt's emotional outburst during a game night makes Carrie realize that Aidan must focus on family issues without her being a distraction. She gives Aidan a key to her townhouse, telling him to visit anytime.
26	5	"Under the Table"	Julie Rottenberg	Rachel Palmer	June 26, 2025
Carrie's downstairs neighbor, noted author Duncan Reeves, angrily complains that her high heels make too much noise on the bare floors. After a scary encounter with another Airbnb occupant, Miranda flees and stays with Carrie until Seema can find her find an apartment. Just before an urban glamping weekend with Lisa and Herbert, Harry tells Charlotte he has prostate cancer but assures her it was caught early. Aidan secretly buys the one-of-a-kind dining table that Carrie wanted and has it delivered to her townhouse as a surprise. Miranda's first sleepover at Joy's is interrupted by Joy's two annoying dogs. Seema's small business loan application is declined. Lisa and Herbert experience communication issues. Lisa tells Charlotte that she has a "work crush" on Marion, her handsome male editor. Carrie and Duncan make peace and have dinner together.
27	6	"Silent Mode"	Julie Rottenberg	Susan Fales-Hill	July 3, 2025
Carrie and Duncan agree to read each other's first book chapter. Aidan accidentally breaks a window in Carrie's antique French doors, setting him on a quest to find a period-appropriate glass replacement. Seema, adjusting to a downsized lifestyle while starting her own firm, finds Miranda a perfect condo. Joy and Brady meet and surprisingly hit it off. Business is booming at Anthony's Hot Fella's café. Lisa learns that Marion is married. When her actor father, Lawrence Todd, unexpectedly dies, his brash theatre manager, Lucille Highwater, takes charge and arranges a theatrical-style funeral. Aidan apologetically tells Carrie that he slept with ex-wife, Kathy. Carrie is forgiving while clarifying they never agreed to be exclusive during their five-year relationship pause. When Carrie runs into Charlotte who is buying adult diapers, Charlotte breaks down and reveals Harry's cancer diagnosis.
28	7	"They Wanna Have Fun"	Anu Valia	Lucas Froehlich	July 10, 2025
Carrie and Duncan rave about each other's first chapters. Diego sends Lily a breakup text. Anthony meets Gia, Giuseppe's overbearing Italian-American mother. Carrie nearly reveals Harry's cancer diagnosis to Miranda while planning Charlotte's birthday party. At Bergdorf Goodman, Charlotte catches Harry with another woman—his secret personal shopper, Bonnie. Charlotte is upset that Bonnie knows about Harry's illness while Harry has insisted she tell no one. Rock insists that a moping Lily attend their mother's party, saying something is troubling her. A karaoke machine unleashes some party guests' inner wannabe singer. Harry realizes Charlotte needs her friends' emotional support and tells Carrie, Lisa, and Miranda about his illness. Adam tells Seema he broke up with his girlfriend, and they leave the party together. After observing Carrie and Duncan flirting, Miranda questions Carrie and Aidan's relationship, noting its years-long difficulty. Carrie is offended and insists nothing has happened with Duncan.
29	8	"Happily Ever After"	Anu Valia	Julie Rottenberg & Elisa Zuritsky	July 17, 2025
Aidan arrives for an extended visit, saying Wyatt now lives with Kathy. Harry is recovering from prostate surgery. Charlotte curates a new art show, but her vertigo recurs during the process. Carrie rejects Aidan's suggestion that they dine with Duncan, saying he is only a professional associate. Seema and Adam's relationship hits a snag when he mentions never using traditional deodorant. Lisa's secret attraction to Marion progresses to a sexual dream. Meanwhile, Marion arranges an important professional contact for Lisa. Miranda is tempted to drink after Joy, unaware she is a recovering alcoholic, leaves a bottle of gin at the apartment. Miranda resists and throws it out. Giuseppe suggests Anthony make dinner for Gia so they can become better acquainted.
30	9	"Present Tense"	Anu Valia	Julie Rottenberg & Elisa Zuritsky	July 24, 2025
After asking Aidan to avoid Duncan, Carrie is annoyed to find them having coffee together. Adam convinces Seema to use a rock crystal as a natural deodorant, which is ineffective during her business meeting. Unable to obtain a business loan, Seema sinks her entire savings into opening her own real estate office. Gia attempts to bribe Anthony to breakup with Giuseppe, saying Anthony is too old. Miranda tells Joy she is a recovering alcoholic, causing Joy to question her own reasons for drinking. Charlotte and Harry are on bed rest, convalescing from their ailments. Herbert drives Lisa crazy obsessing about his diet and weight while campaigning for city comptroller. Carrie is angry after Aidan deliberately interrupts her and Duncan's writers' session. She later claims Aidan still distrusts her with other men, due to her once cheating on him with Big. Aidan admits he does not fully trust her, and Carrie ends their relationship.
31	10	"Better than Sex"	Michael Patrick King	Samantha Irby	July 31, 2025
As Carrie and Duncan grow closer, Carrie's literary output increases while Duncan falls behind his book deadline. Brady informs Miranda and Steve that he enrolled in culinary school and says he has gotten Mia, a woman he barely knows, pregnant. Steve is furious while Miranda schemes to meet Mia at her hair salon workplace. Charlotte seeks guidance and comfort with a spiritual advisor on Zoom, while Lisa struggles balancing work, marriage, parenting, and Herbert's political campaign. After an uncomfortable encounter with his supposedly "asexual" senior roommate, Giuseppe agrees to live with Anthony. Seema worries that Adam has "maternal issues" after she accidentally demolishes a large climbing plant that represents his deceased mother. Herbert, initially in the lead, loses the city comptroller election. Brady, angry over Steve's outburst, moves in with Miranda. At a publishing party, Duncan introduces Carrie to his editor and ex-wife, Imogen. Carrie spends the night with Duncan, who is returning to England permanently.
32	11	"Forget About the Boy"	Michael Patrick King	Michael Patrick King & Susan Fales-Hill	August 7, 2025
Carrie's editor Amanda loves her novel but suggests a more upbeat ending, saying a woman left alone is a romantic tragedy. Miranda infuriates Brady by inviting Mia to her upcoming Thanksgiving Day dinner. Harry struggles to regain his sexual function following prostate surgery. Rock and Henry perform in their high school's production of Thoroughly Modern Millie. Herbert, dejected over his election loss, alienates Lisa. After declaring they love each other, Adam wants Seema to meet his sister. Meanwhile, Seema recommends Carrie buy the small apartment beneath her Gramercy townhouse as an investment. Anthony accepts Giuseppe's marriage proposal but worries Giuseppe considers him as a parent. Carrie revisits her old apartment only to discover that Lisette has converted it into separate living spaces to accommodate a roommate. Carrie writes an epilogue to her novel.
33	12	"Party of One"	Michael Patrick King	Michael Patrick King & Susan Fales-Hill	August 14, 2025
Miranda and Steve are unready to be grandparents. Harry regains his sexual function. Lisa and Marion address their growing attraction and agree to remain strictly professional. Lisa and Herbert reaffirm their relationship, while Herbert rebounds from his election loss. Dining out alone gives Carrie food for thought on singlehood. Giuseppe assures Anthony that he is not a father figure. Seema accepts that Adam rejects traditional marriage and questions her own belief regarding it, while adapting to Adam's bohemian lifestyle. Miranda's Thanksgiving dinner plans dwindle as invitees bail, including Charlotte and Harry, the Wexleys, Steve, Seema, and Anthony who all prefer celebrating at home. Meanwhile, chef Brady is annoyed that pregnant Mia arrives with two eccentric friends, one with dietary issues. Thrice-married Mark Kasabian also comes, which Carrie realizes is a set-up arranged by the absent Charlotte. Miranda briefly leaves the gathering to comfort Joy, whose dog is undergoing emergency surgery. The evening finally washes out when the toilet backs up and floods Miranda's bathroom. Back at home, Carrie amends her novel's epilogue to read that the heroine realized she was not alone but rather was "on her own."

== Production ==
=== Development ===
In December 2016, Radar Online reported that a script for a third Sex and the City film had been approved. However, on September 28, 2017, Sarah Jessica Parker confirmed that the third film was not going to happen. She said, "We had this beautiful, funny, heartbreaking, joyful, very relatable script and story. It's not just disappointing that we don't get to tell the story and have that experience, but more so for that audience that has been so vocal in wanting another movie." It was reported in 2018 that Kim Cattrall did not want to return as Samantha Jones in the film due to disagreeing with its planned storylines, involving killing off Mr. Big and Samantha receiving sexting and nude pictures from Miranda's 14-year-old son, Brady. Cattrall later clarified in 2019 that she opted not to appear in a third film, explaining she "went past the finish line" portraying the character of Samantha because of her love for the franchise.

In December 2020, it was reported that the proposed third film's script had been redeveloped as a miniseries revival of the original Sex and the City television series in development at HBO Max, without Cattrall returning as Samantha, in line with her previous comments. In January 2021, And Just Like That... was confirmed by HBO Max as a series which would consist of 10 episodes. In February 2021, Samantha Irby, Rachna Fruchbom, Keli Goff, Julie Rottenberg and Elisa Zuritsky joined the series as part of the writing team. Rotternberg and Zuritsky also serve as executive producers. It was also confirmed that long-time series costume designer and collaborator Patricia Field would not be returning to work on the revival. However, she recommended her friend and colleague Molly Rogers to the creative team for consultation. On March 22, 2022, HBO Max renewed the series for a second season. On August 22, 2023, Max renewed the series for a third season.

On August 1, 2025, King announced that the series would end with the third season with a two-part series finale. The decision to end the series came while writing the last episode of the third season.

=== Casting ===
Upon the series order announcement, Sarah Jessica Parker, Cynthia Nixon, and Kristin Davis were reprising their roles as close friends living in New York City. In May 2021, Sara Ramírez was cast as a series regular, while Chris Noth was cast to reprise his role in an undisclosed capacity. On June 9, 2021, Mario Cantone, Willie Garson, David Eigenberg, and Evan Handler all joined the cast to reprise their respective roles in undisclosed capacities. In July 2021, Sarita Choudhury, Nicole Ari Parker, Karen Pittman, and Isaac Cole Powell joined the cast in starring roles while Alexa Swinton, Cree Cicchino, Niall Cunningham, and Cathy Ang were cast in undisclosed capacities and Brenda Vaccaro and Ivan Hernandez were cast in recurring roles. In August 2021, Julie Halston was cast to reprise her role in a guest-starring capacity while Christopher Jackson and LeRoy McClain were cast in recurring roles. Willie Garson, who played Stanford Blatch throughout Sex and the City and reprised his role in the new series, died on September 21, only three months after his return, after filming his scenes for the series' first three episodes. The new series explained his absence via a letter to Carrie in episode four. On November 8, 2021, Bobby Lee announced on an Instagram post that he has a small role in the revival.

Despite Mr. Big dying in the first episode, Noth was set to appear as Big in a fantasy sequence in the season finale, but he was edited out after sexual assault allegations were brought against him.

On August 19, 2022, John Corbett was cast to reprise his role as Aidan Shaw in a recurring capacity for the second season. On October 18, 2022, Tony Danza joined the cast in a recurring role as Che's TV father for their new sitcom. On May 31, 2023, it was announced that Kim Cattrall would return as Samantha Jones for a cameo in the second-season finale despite her ongoing feud with Parker.

On February 26, 2024, it was announced that Ramírez would not be returning as Che Diaz for the third season. On March 22, 2024, it was reported that Pittman would not be returning as Dr. Nya Wallace for the third season. On May 1, 2024, it was announced that Rosie O'Donnell was cast as Mary in an undisclosed capacity. On June 27, 2024, Dolly Wells and Sebastiano Pigazzi were promoted to series regulars while Logan Marshall-Green, Mehcad Brooks, and Jonathan Cake were cast in recurring capacities.

=== Filming ===
Production began in June 2021 in New York City. The first table read was held on June 11, 2021, at the show's studio in Manhattan. Filming had commenced on location in New York City by July 9, 2021, and was commemorated by the release of a promotional photo of Parker, Nixon and Davis on the streets of Manhattan. To mislead speculation about a major plot line, Noth arrived on location the day his character's funeral was filmed. On October 11, 2021, it was reported that filming had taken place on location in Paris, France. Filming for the first season concluded on December 6, 2021. Filming for the second season began on October 4, 2022, and concluded on April 14, 2023, in New York City. The third season began filming on May 1, 2024, and wrapped on October 28, 2024.

Pittman had a smaller role in season two due to the simultaneous filming of And Just Like That... and Apple's The Morning Show and was no longer a part of the cast from season 3 due to further scheduling conflicts.

== Release ==
The series premiered on December 9, 2021, with the first two episodes available immediately and the rest debuting on a weekly basis until the season finale on February 3, 2022. The 11-episode second season was released on June 22, 2023, with two new episodes and the rest debuting on a weekly basis. The third season premiered on May 29, 2025. The series ended on August 14, 2025 and, as per a press statement released after episode 10, concluded the franchise with a two-episode finale.

== Reception ==
=== Audience viewership ===
And Just Like That... was HBO Max's most-watched series debut, including both HBO and HBO Max Originals premiered on the service, until it was surpassed by the premiere of House of the Dragon. The first season placed within the service's top 10 most-watched premieres including film debuts. The series was the most-watched first viewing in the service's history at the time of its premiere, implying that new subscribers enlisted to watch the series.

Viewership for the second season fell significantly by 59%. The premiere of the second season averaged 463,000 households over a live-plus-three-day viewing period, down from the first season's 1.1 million households. Viewership for the following episodes fell an additional 13%, suggesting that most viewers had lost interest and abandoned the series. Despite a steep drop in viewership, the second season was the most-watched returning Max Original series until it was dethroned by the second season of Our Flag Means Death.

The third season continued to see viewership decrease. The premiere averaged 429,000 households over a live-plus-three-day viewing period, representing a 7% drop in viewership from the season 2 premiere, and a more than 60% drop from the season 1 premiere. Viewership consistently declined each week as new episodes aired, likely contributing to the decision to end the series. Shortly after its cancellation was announced, the series fell from the top spot on HBO Max’s streaming charts. Viewership for the series finale was down 7% from the season 2 finale.

Overall viewership for And Just Like That... paled in comparison to Sex and the City, with the original series debuting to 2.8 million viewers and eventually reaching over 10.6 million viewers for the series finale.

=== Critical response ===
Critical response of And Just Like That...
Season	Rotten Tomatoes	Metacritic
1	48% (80 reviews)	55 (33 reviews)
2	63% (71 reviews)	56 (18 reviews)
3	45% (42 reviews)	64 (14 reviews)

For the first season, the review aggregator website Rotten Tomatoes reported a 48% approval rating based on 80 critic reviews. The website's critics consensus reads, "And Just Like That... fails to recapture Sex and the City's heady fizz, but like a fine wine, these characters have developed subtler depths with age." Metacritic, which uses a weighted average, assigned a score of 55 out of 100 based on 33 critics, indicating "mixed or average". The New York Times' review recognized the show's strengths, noting its "very good" moments; while also offering a nuanced perspective, characterizing it as both "painful" and "part dramedy about heartbreak, part clumsy attempt at relevance", citing the complexity of reviving a show, offering a thoughtful perspective on maintaining relevance and connection with viewers.

The themes of diversity and social justice were criticized. The Telegraph described it as "tediously woke", and the Radio Times wrote: "The main three's newfound social and cultural awareness is shoe-horned into such a degree the whole endeavor feels often cloying.'" Deadline Hollywood wrote that "far too many 2021 cultural touchstones and new characters are awkwardly parachuted into [the show] ... as if to check a box". EmpireOnline added: "the attempts to paint a rich, real, diverse world are ham-fisted, inauthentic and riddled with self-consciousness, awkwardness and moments of self-congratulation." Specifically, the character of Che Díaz was derided online and was described as one of the worst characters in television history. Kristin Corry of Vice Media criticized the tokenization of Black characters, writing "The 'Sex and the City' reboot wants to undo its colorblind legacy by including Black characters. Unfortunately, they're treated as luxury accessories."

Rotten Tomatoes reported a 63% approval rating for the second season based on 71 critic reviews. The website's critics consensus states, "And Just Like That... still stumbles where Sex and the City once confidently strutted, but this much-improved second season comes a lot closer to offering fans their favorite cosmopolitan with a twist." On Metacritic, the second season received a score of 56 based on reviews from 18 critics, indicating "mixed or average". Critics acknowledged that the second season was an improvement from the first, however many still considered it to be one of the worst shows of the year.

The third season received a 46% approval rating on Rotten Tomatoes, based on 41 critic reviews. The website's critics consensus reads, "Having finally shaken off the rust while beginning to act its own age, And Just Like That... gets comfortable in its own skin in this much-improved third season." Although the first half of the season earned generally positive reviews, critical reception turned largely negative as the second half of the season aired, culminating in a universally panned series finale. The series finale has been ranked among the worst TV finales of all time.

=== Response from Peloton ===
After the first-season episode in which Chris Noth's character dies following a Peloton bike workout, the stock for the company dropped significantly. The company issued a statement through Suzanne Steinbaum, a cardiologist and member of the company's health and wellness advisory, saying that they agreed to the product placement but were not aware of how it would be used in the pivotal scene. The statement also said not to blame the company for the character's death, and cited some contributing factors, such as his lifestyle (e.g., his consumption of steaks and cigars) and a cardiac surgery in a previous season. Three days after the episode aired, the company released an ad, featuring Chris Noth and narrated by Ryan Reynolds, with Reynolds quickly citing the benefits of cycling and ending with "He's alive." Four days later, the ad was removed after sexual assault allegations were reported against Chris Noth.

=== Accolades ===
The series was given the Seal of Authentic Representation from the Ruderman Family Foundation for the portrayal of Steve Brady by David Eigenberg, and Chloe by Ali Stroker, as actors with disabilities and at least five lines of dialogue. The series was also recognized with The ReFrame Stamp for hiring underrepresented gender identities and people of color.

The second season was nominated for a GLAAD Media Award in the Outstanding Comedy Series category.

== Documentary ==
A documentary that serves as a behind-the-scenes look of the series titled as And Just Like That... The Documentary was released on February 3, 2022.
