= One Fifth Avenue (Manhattan) =

Residential skyscraper in Manhattan, New York

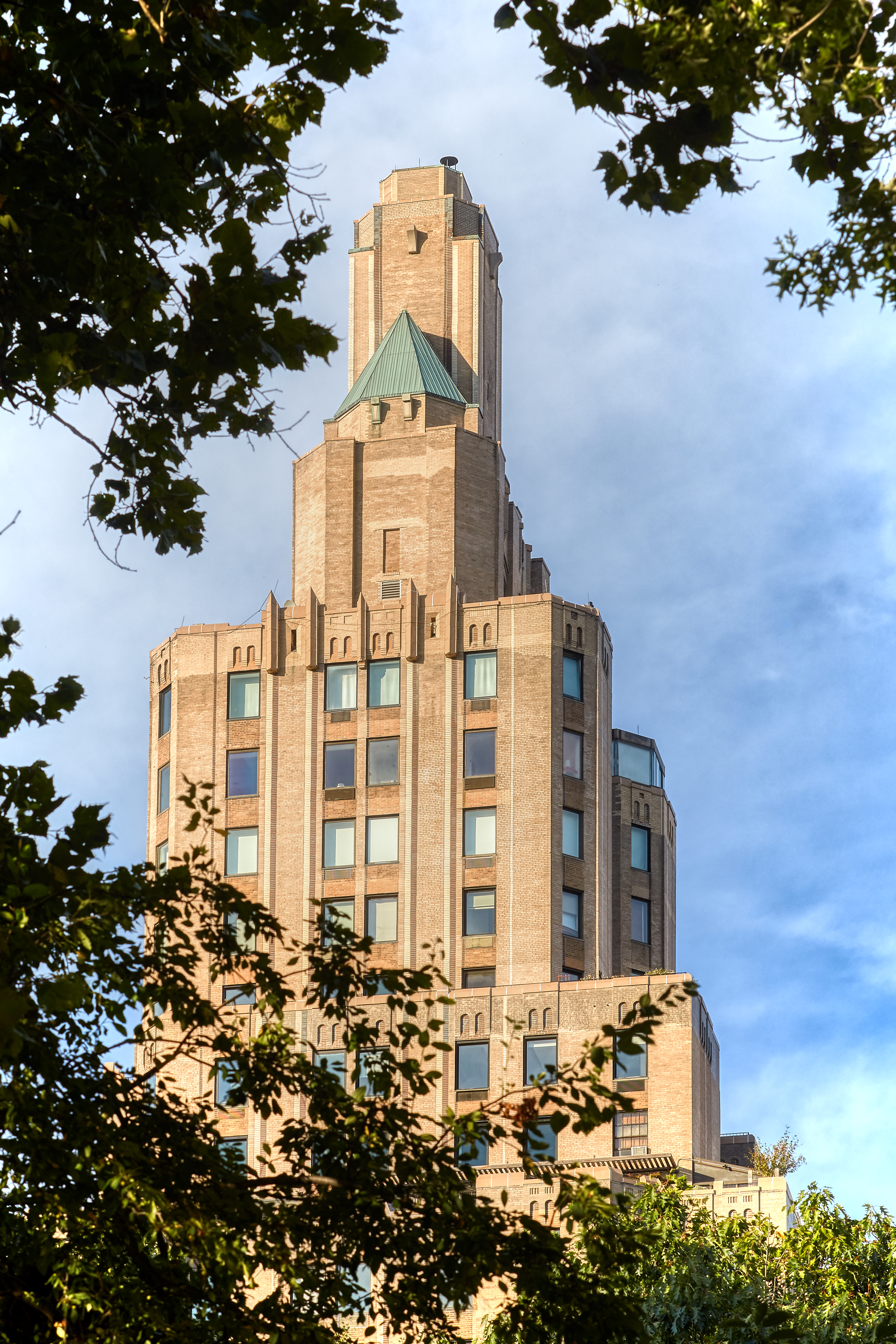
- The building, as seen from Washington Square Park in 2019
- Interactive map of the One Fifth Avenue area

General information
- Architectural style: Art Deco, modernism
- Location: Greenwich Village, Manhattan, 1 Fifth Avenue, New York City, United States
- Coordinates: 40.732062°N 73.996293°W
- Groundbreaking: 1926
- Completed: 1927

Height
- Height: 353 feet (108 m)

Technical details
- Floor count: 27

Design and construction
- Architect: Harvey Wiley Corbett
- Architecture firm: Helme & Corbett

One Fifth Avenue is a residential skyscraper in the Washington Square area of Greenwich Village in Manhattan, New York City, United States. It was designed by Harvey Wiley Corbett of the firm Helme & Corbett.

In 1926, developer Joseph G. Siegel leased the lot on the southeast corner of 8th Street and Fifth Avenue from Sailors' Snug Harbor. Construction began in 1926, and the building opened in 1927 as an apartment hotel with 2- and 3-room units. When first built, it was received with both acclaim and controversy, called "a 27-story apartment hotel, a thing of rare beauty" and "a modern skyscraper in a neighborhood of brownstones".

It was converted to a co-op in 1976, and is "one of the Village's most desirable co-ops."

== Architecture ==
The architectural style has been described as Art Deco and modern, and having "a vaguely Venetian or Gothic cast", although The New York Times assessed it as "astylar, more 'tall building' than anything else." The flat exterior incorporates brick of different colors to create the illusion of depth.

== Notable residents ==
- James Burrows, co-creator of the hit television show Cheers
- Tim Burton, director
- Helena Bonham Carter, actress
- Brian De Palma, director
- Jessica Lange, actress
- Gwyneth Paltrow, actress (during the 1990s)
- Brad Pitt, actor (during the 1990s)
- Keith Richards, member of The Rolling Stones
- Patti Smith, singer (during the 1980s)
- Gracie Abrams, singer (2025)

== In popular culture ==
- The building appears in the painting Behind the Square by Niles Spencer.
- The now-closed One Fifth Restaurant was a location of Woody Allen's 1989 Crimes and Misdemeanors and in the 1978 Jill Clayburgh film An Unmarried Woman.
- Writer Candace Bushnell's 2008 novel One Fifth Avenue is named for and set at the building.
- The sign indicating its address is found by the other girls from Miss Hannigan's orphanage in the 1982 film Annie while they are searching for 987 Fifth Avenue.

== See also ==
- List of former hotels in Manhattan
