= Trading Up (novel) =

2003 novel by Candace Bushnell

- First edition
- Author: Candace Bushnell
- Genre: Romance, Chick lit
- Publisher: Hyperion Books
- Publication date: 2003
- Pages: 320 pp.
- ISBN: 9780316726191
- Preceded by: Four Blondes

Trading Up is a 2003 romance novel by Candace Bushnell. The novel continues the story of Janey Wilcox, an aging supermodel first featured in Bushnell's Four Blondes. According to the author, Wilcox is based on Undine Spragg, the protagonist of the Edith Wharton novel The Custom of the Country. Bushnell describes both Wilcox and Spragg as ambitious social climbers who are deliberately unsympathetic.

== Synopsis ==
Janey Wilcox's flagging career was revived when, in the closing pages of Four Blondes, she accepted a contract with Victoria's Secret. Trading Up stars a slightly older and wiser Janey Wilcox, one who is determined to make it to the top.

Wilcox begins the novel as an older but still quite popular lingerie and runway model whose aspirations now include breaking into show business. Fortunately, the New York social scene is dominated by powerful media mogul/starlet couples. Spending a summer in the Hamptons, Janey Wilcox befriends Mimi Kilroy, wife of media mogul George Paxton. Kilroy introduces her new model friend to Selden Rose, an up-and-coming CEO of cable television network MovieTime. At first Janey is uninterested in Selden and is instead enamored with Zizi, a young Argentinian polo player with model looks and the countenance of a member of the European elite. Only in an attempt to attract Zizi does she begin dating Selden.

Janey and Selden are quickly married, while Zizi begins an affair with Mimi.

Janey continually struggles with her torrid past as a consummate seducer of powerful men and is known in many circles as a semi-prostitute. Determined to become a movie producer, Janey attempts to maneuver her way to the top of the New York social scene by any means necessary, including using her younger sister and her brother-in-law, a popular rock star, for her own ends.

Eventually it is revealed that Janey's reputation as a prostitute is rather well-deserved and a past indiscretion with a powerful media mogul is publicly revealed. Janey's reputation is ruined and she splits from her husband, fleeing to Los Angeles.

In the end Janey has managed to get a screenplay (written years earlier) into the hands of the right people in Hollywood and is poised to embark on a new path as a Hollywood movie producer. The story ends on a triumphant note, with Janey poised to conquer Hollywood.

== Reception ==
In the London Guardian, Stephanie Merritt wrote that the book "succeeds because she [Bushnell] provides what readers and audiences have always craved, from Molière down through Wilde and Mitford to Dynasty and the rash of current celebrity magazines—a window on to the stupidities and weaknesses of the rich and powerful, inspiring an addictive mix of envy and moral superiority."

By contrast, in New York Magazine, John Homans wrote that the work was marked by the "staggering emptiness" of its characters who are "human cartoons," each of whom "is equipped with an empty thought bubble." He asked, "Candace Bushnell helped invent the world she describes in her new novel—so why does Trading Up feel like it was written by someone from Des Moines?"
