= Lipstick Jungle (TV series) =

American comedy-drama television series (2008–2009)

- Genre: Comedy drama
- Based on: Lipstick Jungle by Candace Bushnell
- Developed by: DeAnn Heline; Eileen Heisler
- Starring: Brooke Shields; Kim Raver; Lindsay Price; Paul Blackthorne; Andrew McCarthy; Robert Buckley; David Noroña; Kathy Searle
- Theme music composer: Bitter:Sweet
- Opening theme: "The Bomb" by Bitter:Sweet
- Composer: W.G. Walden
- Country of origin: United States
- Original language: English
- No. of seasons: 2
- No. of episodes: 20

Production
- Executive producers: Candace Bushnell; Oliver Goldstick; Timothy Busfield
- Camera setup: Single-camera
- Running time: 47 minutes
- Production companies: Universal Media Studios; Blackie and Blondie Productions

Original release
- Network: NBC
- Release: February 7, 2008 – January 9, 2009

Lipstick Jungle is an American comedy-drama television series developed by DeAnn Heline and Eileen Heisler that aired on NBC from February 7, 2008, to January 9, 2009. The series was produced by NBC Universal Television Studio (now Universal Media Studios). The hour-long series was based on the best-selling novel of the same name by Candace Bushnell, who also served as executive producer alongside showrunner/head writer Oliver Goldstick. The pilot was directed by Gary Winick.

== Plot ==
Lipstick Jungle is a dramedy following the professional and personal lives of three best friends, all of whom are top professionals in their respective careers. Victory Ford (Lindsay Price) is a fashion designer, Nico Reilly (Kim Raver) is the editor-in-chief of Bonfire magazine, and Wendy Healy (Brooke Shields) is the former president of Parador Pictures, currently producing independently. These three powerful women are always there to support one another and navigate the crazy, romantic, and sometimes scary world that is New York City.

== Production ==
The cast initially included Gina Gershon as Wendy Healy, Melissa George as Nico Reilly, Will Toale as Shane Healy, and Robert Buckley as Kirby Atwood, with Matthew Morrison, Scott Cohen, and Edward Herrmann also attached. The show underwent significant changes, though, with all the aforementioned cast being replaced and with executive producers DeAnn Heline and Eileen Heisler, writers Rand Ravich and Jill Gordon, and director Nigel Cole all fired. Melissa George had been personally cast by Bushnell, but left in early 2007 when she was offered the HBO series In Treatment (she was replaced by Kim Raver).

The show premiered on February 7, 2008. as a midseason replacement taking over ER's spot at 10:00 pm Eastern/9:00 pm Central. The series was slated to have 13 episodes per season, but due to the 2007–2008 Writers Guild of America strike, only seven episodes were originally produced for the first season. The first season also competed indirectly with ABC's Cashmere Mafia, created by Bushnell's former creative partner from Sex and the City, Darren Star.

On February 24, 2008, NBC ordered six additional scripts of Lipstick Jungle. On April 2, 2008, NBC renewed Lipstick Jungle for a second season when they announced their fall 2008 lineup. The second season premiered on September 24, airing at 10:00 pm Eastern/9:00 pm Central on Wednesdays. One month later, NBC announced that Lipstick Jungle would move to Fridays at 10:00 pm Eastern/9:00 pm Central effective October 31, 2008.

On November 13, 2008, rumors emerged that NBC would cancel the show due to low ratings, but whether the remaining episodes would be aired in the current time slot was unclear. On November 21, 2008, NBC moved Lipstick Jungle to Fridays at an hour earlier, 9:00 pm Eastern/8:00 pm Central beginning December 5, for the remainder of the season.

On January 9, 2009, the last produced episode of Lipstick Jungle aired, and it was advertised as the season finale. On January 15, 2009, the show was announced as not yet canceled, and could be brought back for episodes based on how the new pilots were received. On January 27, 2009, NBC announced that the show would get the "Friday Night Lights treatment", implying that the show will return on another of NBC Universal's networks for a third season and then replay on NBC midseason.

On February 25, 2009, the future of Lipstick Jungle was once again put in limbo when NBC announced that Lindsay Price was cast in the pilot for ABC's new drama Eastwick. Had Lipstick Jungle received an official third-season pick-up from NBC, though, Price would have pulled out of Eastwick to fulfill her contractual obligation to Lipstick Jungle. On March 28, 2009, Entertainment Weekly reported that the show was officially canceled.

== Cast and characters ==
=== Main ===
- Brooke Shields as Wendy Healy
- Kim Raver as Nico Reilly
- Lindsay Price as Victory Ford
- Paul Blackthorne as Shane Healy
- Andrew McCarthy as Joe Bennett
- Robert Buckley as Kirby Atwood (season 2; recurring season 1)

=== Recurring ===
- Lorraine Bracco as Janice Lasher (season 1)
- David Noroña as Salvador
- Rosie Perez as Dahlia Morales (season 2)
- David Alan Basche as Mike Harness
- Mary Tyler Moore as Joyce Connor (season 2)
- Matt Lauria as Roy Merritt
- James Lesure as Griffin Bell (season 2)
- Vanessa Marcil as Josie Scotto (season 2)
- Sarah Hyland as Maddie Healy
- Carlos Ponce as Rodrigo Vega (season 2)
- Julian Sands as Hector Matrick (season 1)

== Episodes ==
=== Season 1 (2008) ===
No. overall	No. in season	Title	Directed by	Written by	Original release date	Prod. code	U.S. viewers (millions)
1	1	"Chapter One: Pilot"	Gary Winick	Teleplay by : DeAnn Heline & Eileen Heisler & Billy Bob Dupree & Candace Bushnell	February 7, 2008	101	7.5
Three longtime friends—Victory, Nico, and Wendy—are challenged with keeping up with complicated business and personal lives. For Wendy, a big-shot film executive, a wife, and a mother, this proves to be a difficult daily juggle. Meanwhile, Victory struggles to revive her once top-notch fashion career, and Nico is forced to deal with serious marriage issues on top of a stressful working life. For these three powerful women, the road to success in all aspects of life can be rather bumpy from time to time. Luckily, they have each other for support along the way.
2	2	"Chapter Two: Nothing Sacred"	Timothy Busfield	Oliver Goldstick	February 14, 2008	102	6
Wendy enjoys the success of her company's most recent movie, but her celebration is brief. Wendy finds out that her nemesis, Janice Lasher, promoted a novel for publication defacing her as an empowered businesswoman and, even worse in Wendy's eyes, a bad mother. Elsewhere, Nico's relationship with Kirby heats up, and instills her with a liberating mentality that inspires her to shake things up around the office. Meanwhile, Victory has a problem with the downsizing of her company to just one employee: herself. She, however, is highly intrigued by her new man, Joe Bennett, who turns out to be a very different person from whom she initially thought.
3	3	"Chapter Three: Pink Poison"	Jace Alexander	John Levenstein	February 21, 2008	103	5.7
Wendy's rival, Janice Lasher, makes Wendy look bad as a mother, while preparing to release her new book. Wendy tries to prove the claims incorrect by bringing her daughter to a "Women in Media" luncheon. Nico tries to cool her affair with Kirby. Victory introduces Mr. Joe Bennett to Wendy and Nico, which leads to a major shift in the direction of their relationship.
4	4	"Chapter Four: Bombay Highway"	Jay Chandrasekhar	Rob Bragin	February 28, 2008	104	5.6
Wendy sets her sights on a film set in India that she feels has great potential despite it not being an obvious revenue generator. Wendy decides to host an extravagant premiere party and gives Victory a chance to design for the star actress. Meanwhile, drama begins to unfold as Nico reveals to Wendy and Victory her secret affair with Kirby. The lawsuit heats up when Kirby decides that he wants to see it to the end. Nico is faced with a tough decision that could be her only way of keeping her life together, but at what expense?
5	5	"Chapter Five: Dressed to Kill"	Timothy Busfield	Amanda Lasher	March 6, 2008	105	5.8
Victory discovers that her work has been stolen by a competitive designer, and must discover her work was snatched. Upon hearing that her old assistant, Reese, is involved in the scandal, Victory must decide if she believes Reese's story. Meanwhile, things heat up again between Nico and Kirby, but not without Nico first setting some ground rules. Nico helps Kirby get a job, but when she spots chemistry between Kirby and the lead actress, she cannot help but wonder how deep her feelings really are for him. Wendy and Shane watch Shane's old band play; Shane gets back on the stage. After Wendy realizes Shane's talent, she tries to pitch his demo for one of her upcoming films.
6	6	"Chapter Six: Take the High Road"	Timothy Busfield	Lisa Melamed	March 13, 2008	106	5.4
A big breakout project, involving J.K. Rowling, presents itself to Wendy, who tells Nico only after swearing her to secrecy. Later, Nico is grilled by Hector, and she reveals Wendy's secret to him. Hector immediately assigns both Nico and Wendy to head to Scotland to force a meeting with Rowling. Considering Shane's new job, Wendy is initially opposed to going, but Shane convinces her going would be for the best. Nico, unaware that Wendy will make the Scotland trip, invites Kirby, setting up an interesting trip. Meanwhile, Victory is enjoying her newfound investor and thoroughly enjoying the man's willingness to fund all of her ideas. She grows suspicious and gets to the bottom of the situation, finding to her surprise that actually Joe is funding her company.
7	7	"Chapter Seven: Carpe Threesome"	Timothy Busfield	Lisa Alden & Dan Bucatinsky	March 20, 2008	107	6.9
Wendy, dealing with a very difficult scriptwriter, Lorraine Lippman, who cannot write an ending to her film, makes a bold move and orders production forward. Lorraine is left to finalize the script on schedule. Nico, still caught up in her dual, faces a harsh reality when she receives news that Charles has suffered a heart attack. The scare makes her realize how much she misses her marriage, and she brings her life back into perspective. The episode also reveals Charles' affair with one of his students. Elsewhere, Victory is getting used to the idea of Joe Bennett as her boss, instead of her boyfriend. Hockey superstar Chris "Parks" Parker and his wife grow very fond of Victory. The relationship heats up, which puts Victory in a very compromising position.

=== Season 2 (2008–09) ===
No. overall	No. in season	Title	Directed by	Written by	Original release date	Prod. code	U.S. viewers (millions)
8	1	"Chapter Eight: Pandora's Box"	Timothy Busfield	Oliver Goldstick	September 24, 2008	201	6.3
Nico is haunted by her infidelity when Charles gives her a photograph that Kirby took of her during her affair. Overcome with guilt, she debates whether she should tell Charles the truth, finally deciding to take extreme measures to save her marriage. After discovering her underaged daughter Maddie at a bar, Wendy decides to cut back on her hours at the office to spend more time at home. Wendy's transition into domestic life is not easy, especially when her opinionated mother unexpectedly comes to the city for a visit. Victory finds avoiding Joe to be difficult, and he is desperate to get her back. Trying to move on from their personal relationship, she hires publicist Dahlia Morales to help brand her business and find a retail space.
9	2	"Chapter Nine: Help!"	Don Scardino	Dan Bucatinsky & Lisa Melamed	October 1, 2008	202	5.3
Nico tries to adjust to her new life as a widow, but the appearance of Megan, her husband's former student and secret lover, only makes the road rockier. Victory, though, begins renovations on her new store, and meets a handsome contractor named Rodrigo who piques her interest. Wendy is caught in a predicament when she learns her latest film is in jeopardy after its star, who is also her friend, trusts her with a secret.
10	3	"Chapter Ten: Let It Be"	Tricia Brock	Yvette Lee Bowser & Jennie Snyder Urman	October 8, 2008	203	4.8
Nico has a lot on her mind as she butts heads with the new CEO, Griffin Bell, and Kirby complicates matters when he insists on taking their relationship out in public. Meanwhile, things are heating up quickly for Victory and her new contractor Rodrigo, but problems arise when Joe constantly interrupts her new relationship. Later, Victory gets a surprise when Rodrigo shares that he has another woman in his life. Elsewhere, Wendy is consumed by her new John Lennon project, which begins to affect her personal and professional lives.
11	4	"Chapter Eleven: The F-Word"	Timothy Busfield	Story by : Andrew Kreisberg & Brett Mahoney; Teleplay by : Lisa Melamed	October 22, 2008	204	4.3
Victory plans to meet Rodrigo's daughter, against Dahlia's advice. Nico asks Kirby to escort her to a glitzy event, but her past keeps coming back to haunt her. After she is fired, Wendy focuses all of her energy on her home life, to Maddie's dismay.
12	5	"Chapter Twelve: Scary, Scary Night!"	Michael Fields	Jennie Snyder Urman & Dan Bucatinsky	October 29, 2008	205	4.9
Victory has a disturbing dream about Joe that she tries to interpret. Nico makes expensive plans for Christmas with Kirby, but he refuses to let her pay for him. Shane leaves for a business trip without saying goodbye, to Wendy and she seeks solace from her friend, Dennis.
13	6	"Chapter Thirteen: The Lyin', The Bitch and The Wardrobe"	Andrew McCarthy	Oliver Goldstick & Francesca Rollins	October 31, 2008	206	3.2
Victory deals with her store opening and Dahlia's extravagant plans for the opening. Joe has worries where his relationship with Victory is concerned, and makes a decision. Wendy heads back to Parador Pictures to pitch a new movie, but the new VP puts a damper on her mood. Nico runs into Megan with her new baby and instantly bonds with him.
14	7	"Chapter Fourteen: Let the Games Begin"	Arlene Sanford	Rick Marin & Ilene Rosenzweig	November 7, 2008	207	3.3
Nico is introduced to Kirby's mother. Victory's latest project calls for input from Joe, who has been avoiding her. Wendy's jealousy is tweaked when Shane signs on with a new manager.
15	8	"Chapter Fifteen: The Sisterhood of the Traveling Prada"	Melanie Mayron	Yvette Lee Bowser	November 14, 2008	208	3.7
Wendy walks in on Nico and Griffin having an enjoyable lunch together, which leads to tension and a sense of betrayal between the friends. The two must put their problems aside when they find that Victory is a mess after she learns that Joe was ready to propose to her.
16	9	"Chapter Sixteen: Thanksgiving"	Timothy Busfield	Mark Driscoll	November 21, 2008	209	3.4
Wendy rushes to plan and prepare a big Thanksgiving dinner, where all the ingredients used are local. Times get a bit more hectic when her judgmental mother Joyce, her newly single successor Sal, and Shane's distraught manager Josie all arrive for the festivities. Nico plans the perfect Thanksgiving with Kirby, but a last-minute request from Megan leaves baby Charlie in the inexperienced couple's hands.
17	10	"Chapter Seventeen: Bye, Bye Baby"	Jay Chandrasekhar	Lisa Melamed	December 5, 2008	210	3.4
Victory tries to land a new multimillion-dollar client, and at the same time Nico and Kirby adjust to life with their new baby. In doing so, they find themselves at a crossroads in their relationship. Meanwhile, when an arrogant movie producer tries to take her dream project from her, Wendy finds getting the project off the ground to be increasingly difficult.
18	11	"Chapter Eighteen: Indecent Exposure"	Timothy Busfield	Jennie Snyder Urman	December 12, 2008	211	3.9
Victory has to decide whether or not to shed her clothing for her brand's new ad campaign, and learns a bit more about herself and her affections for Joe Bennett. An emotionally vulnerable Nico is riding a hormonal roller coaster from fertility treatments, and forms an unlikely bond with Griffin.
19	12	"Chapter Nineteen: Lovers' Leaps"	Ken Whittingham	Mark Driscoll & Monica Henderson	January 2, 2009	212	4.2
Wendy finds out that Shane is still considering going on tour with Natasha Bedingfield, which puts a strain on their marriage. Nico's quest for parenthood takes a detour when a "New Media" executive challenges her sovereignty.
20	13	"Chapter Twenty: La Vie En Pose"	Andrew McCarthy	Oliver Goldstick & Maya Goldsmith	January 9, 2009	213	4.1
Wendy makes a daring bid on a highly sought-after film, but loses to a corporation. Maddie goes off the rails in Shane's absence and accuses Wendy of driving Shane away, but the two eventually make up. Nico asks Dahlia to help boost her professional status, and lands her a guest appearance on the Today Show with Kathie Lee and Hoda Kotb, but Kathie and Hoda put Nico on the spot by discussing Nico's relationship with Kirby on national television. Nico makes an honest and heartfelt speech about what Kirby meant to her, which Kirby sees. He shows up at Nico's apartment and tells her that he is willing to do whatever it takes to be with her. Victory's parents come to town for Victory and Joe's engagement party. Despite being low on finances, Joe splurges on Victory's parents. Victory's dad does not approve of Joe, and refuses to give his blessing. Joe repairs the strain by finding a compromise. The episode and the series end with a montage of the three women being there for each other throughout the show.

== UK ratings ==
Below is a table of ratings for UK digital channel Living, the network showing Lipstick Jungle.

=== Season one ===
Season one of Lipstick Jungle began airing on September 22, 2008, on Mondays at 10 pm, following one of Living's most popular US acquisitions America's Next Top Model. The network soon brought in a name for their Monday night schedule, 'I Heart NY Mondays', as both shows are set in New York.

Weekly ratings
#	Episode	Air date	Time slot	Viewers	Weekly Rank for Living
1	"Pilot"	September 22, 2008	Monday, 10:00 pm	238,000	4
2	"Chapter Two: Nothing Sacred"	September 29, 2008	Monday, 10:00 pm	139,000	7
3	"Chapter Three: Pink Poison"	October 6, 2008	Monday, 10:00 pm	TBC	TBC
4	"Chapter Four: Bombay Highway"	October 13, 2008	Monday, 10:00 pm	183,000	5
5	"Chapter Five: Dressed to Kill"	October 20, 2008	Monday, 10:00 pm	214,000	8
6	"Chapter Six: Take the High Road"	October 27, 2008	Monday, 10:00 pm	TBC	TBC
7	"Chapter Seven: Carpe Threesome"	November 3, 2008	Monday, 10:00 pm	178,000	6

=== Season two ===
The second season of the show began airing immediately after the first run's seven episodes had finished.

Weekly ratings
#	Episode	Air Date	Timeslot	Viewers	Weekly Rank for Living
1	"Chapter Eight: Pandora's Box"	November 10, 2008	Monday, 10:00 pm	217,000	4
2	"Chapter Nine: Help!"	November 17, 2008	Monday, 10:00 pm	193,000	4
3	"Chapter Ten: Let It Be"	November 24, 2008	Monday, 10:00 pm	142,000	5
4	"Chapter Eleven: The F-Word"	December 1, 2008	Monday, 10:00 pm	196,000	3
5	"Chapter Twelve: Scary, Scary Night!"	December 8, 2008	Monday, 10:00 pm	TBC	TBC
6	"Chapter Thirteen: The Lyin', The Bitch and The Wardrobe"	December 15, 2008	Monday, 10:00 pm	TBC	TBC
7	"Chapter Fourteen: Let the Games Begin"	December 22, 2008	Monday, 10:00 pm	TBC	TBC
8	"Chapter Fifteen: The Sisterhood of the Traveling Prada"	December 29, 2008	Monday, 10:00 pm	178,000	3
9	"Chapter Sixteen: Thanksgiving"	January 5, 2009	Monday, 10:00 pm	215,000	8
10	"Chapter Seventeen: Bye, bye baby"	January 12, 2009	Monday, 10:00 pm		
11	"Chapter Eighteen: Indecent Exposure"	January 19, 2009	Monday, 10:00 pm	160,000	7
12	"Chapter Nineteen: Lovers' Leap"	January 26, 2009	Monday, 10:00 pm	142,000	9
13	"Chapter Twenty: La Vie en Pose"	February 2, 2009	Monday, 10:00 pm		

== Home media ==
Title	Region 1	Region 2	Region 4
Season one	May 27, 2008	December 26, 2008	September 17, 2008
Season two	May 5, 2009	June 29, 2009	–
Complete	–	October 13, 2011	September 30, 2009

== International distribution ==
The series was broadcast on Living in the UK, TG4 in the Republic of Ireland, Domashniy in Russia, and 7 Network in Australia. CTV Television Network aired the show in Canada, and broadcast by TV3 in New Zealand.

Country	TV network(s)	Series premiere
Australia	Seven Network	June 29, 2008/May 5, 2009 (Season 2)
Austria	ORF 1	September 21, 2009
Brazil	Rede Record	December 8, 2010
United Kingdom	Living TV	September 22, 2008
Hungary	TV2 (Hungary)	January 28, 2009
Hong Kong	Star World	May 30, 2009
Israel	Yes Stars Drama	2008
Bulgaria	Nova Television	December 27, 2008
Germany	ProSieben	September 16, 2009
Canada	Cosmopolitan TV	October 3, 2009
Greece	Alter Channel	October 16, 2009
Italy	Fox Life	February, 2009
Ireland	TG4	October 6, 2008
Latvia	TV3 Latvia, TV3+ Latvia	January 5, 2009
Lithuania	TV3	December 29, 2008 (Both seasons)
Macedonia	Sitel	February 8, 2012
Netherlands	RTL 5	September 22, 2008
New Zealand	TV3	October 21, 2008
Poland	TVP1	November 23, 2008
Portugal	RTP2	September 12, 2008
Slovenia	POP TV	September 8, 2008
Serbia	Fox Life; Prva Plus	May 24, 2011; June 2, 2014
Turkey	DiziMax	July 31, 2008
Chile	Fox Latin America; Mega	June 22, 2008; December 2008
Venezuela	Globovisión	September 2, 2008
Norway	Canal + TV3	September 27, 2008; August 3, 2009
Sweden	TV 3	
Brazil	Fox; Rede Record	August 25, 2008; January 7, 2010
Finland	MTV3	January 13, 2009/August 25, 2009 (Season 2)
Spain	Fox; Divinity	2008; 2011
South Africa	SABC3	
Hungary	TV2	February 3, 2009
Puerto Rico	WKAQ-TV	2009
Estonia	TV3	January 16, 2009
Mexico	Fox Canal 5	2009, Present
Russia	Domashniy	August 3, 2009
Czech Republic	TV Prima	January 11, 2010
The Middle East	ShowSeries (part of Showtime Arabia Cable Network)	2009
Indonesia	Trans 7	2010
Belgium	VIJFtv	November 13, 2010
Switzerland	RSI La 2	May 24, 2011
Georgia	Rustavi 2	February 19, 2012
Croatia	RTL Televizija	July 16, 2012 (Both seasons)
