= Ron Galotti =

American former magazine executive

- Born: Ronald A. Galotti; 1950 (age 75–76); New York City, U.S.
- Occupations: Former magazine executive, publisher
- Years active: 1970s–2003
- Employers: Hearst Communications (former); Condé Nast (former); Talk Media (former)
- Known for: Publisher of Vogue, GQ, Vanity Fair; Co-founder of Talk magazine; Inspiration for Mr. Big character
- Spouses: Lisa Wilcox; Donna Kalajian (divorced)
- Partners: Janice Dickinson (former); Candace Bushnell (former)

Ronald A. "Ron" Galotti is an American former magazine executive and publisher. He was a corporate vice president at Condé Nast and the publisher of Newhouse-owned publications including Vogue, GQ, and Vanity Fair. Galotti conspicuously left Condé Nast to co-found Talk magazine with editor Tina Brown, where he served as president of the company. Talk became a symbol of old-school excess and failed less than three years after its launch. The company was backed by Harvey Weinstein, who reportedly invested $50 million of personal capital. After Talk folded, Galotti returned to Condé Nast and ran GQ for about two years before retiring to Vermont.

== Early life and education ==
Galotti was born in The Bronx, New York City, and raised in Peekskill, Westchester County, New York. His parents, of Italian-Jewish descent, operated a liquor store. As a youth, Galotti raised chickens and earned a five-year 4-H pin from the Yorktown Grange. He had three siblings: a sister born with Down syndrome who died in the late 1990s, an older brother (also deceased), and a younger brother. Galotti's father died when he was nine years old.

After struggling academically and barely graduating from high school, Galotti enlisted in the United States Air Force during the height of the Vietnam War. He was stationed in the Philippines for more than three years, rising to the rank of sergeant. During his military service, he engaged in loan-sharking and later opened a brothel with the proceeds.

== Career ==
=== Early publishing career ===
Following his military discharge, Galotti began his publishing career selling advertising space for Home Sewing News, a publication owned by a friend of his mother's. He subsequently worked for Fawcett Publications before being recruited by Hearst Communications, where he was assigned to launch Country Living magazine.

=== Condé Nast tenure ===
==== First period (1982–1993) ====
In 1982, Galotti was recruited by Condé Nast, initially working on Mademoiselle. He was subsequently assigned to help revive Vanity Fair under editor Tina Brown, before being appointed publisher of Vogue, Condé Nast's flagship publication, and later GQ.

During his tenure as Vanity Fair publisher in the early 1990s, Galotti engineered a dramatic surge in business over a three-year period while collaborating closely with Brown. However, he was abruptly dismissed in May 1993 after advertising gains eroded following Brown's departure to The New Yorker.

==== Return as Vogue publisher (1994–1998) ====
In March 1994, Galotti returned to Condé Nast as publisher of Vogue, taking over during a challenging period when advertising pages had declined 8 percent. He worked closely with editor-in-chief Anna Wintour, though unlike his collaborative relationship with Brown at Vanity Fair, he did not participate in cover selection decisions.

Under Galotti's leadership, Vogue maintained its market dominance with a total circulation of 1.2 million, of which 58.2 percent came from newsstand sales. The magazine significantly outperformed competitors, with Galotti noting that Mirabella, Elle, and Harper's Bazaar combined did not match Vogue's newsstand sales. Beauty remained the magazine's largest advertising category with 944 pages in 1993, followed by fashion with 886 pages.

=== Talk magazine venture ===
In 1998, Galotti departed Condé Nast for the second time to co-found Talk magazine with Tina Brown. The venture was backed by Harvey Weinstein and Miramax Films, with Galotti serving as president of Talk Media.

The magazine's August 1999 premiere issue featured 101 advertisers, with Galotti reserving premium positions for high-end automotive and luxury brands. Despite initial fanfare, Talk struggled financially and ceased publication in early 2002 after less than three years of operation.

=== Final return to GQ ===
Following Talk's closure, Galotti returned to Condé Nast in February 2002 as publisher of GQ, marking his third tenure with the company. However, this appointment proved short-lived; he was dismissed from GQ in July 2003 at age 53, representing his third and final departure from Condé Nast. He was succeeded by Peter King Hunsinger, president of the Condé Nast Bridal Group.

== Personal life ==
=== Marriages and relationships ===
Galotti has been married twice. He first married Donna Kalajian, a publisher at Hearst Communications, in a union that lasted 12 years before ending due to her extramarital affair. He married ski champion Lisa Wilcox in 1996.

Between marriages, Galotti had notable relationships with model Janice Dickinson and author Candace Bushnell. He met Bushnell at a party in 1995, and they dated for approximately one year during the mid-1990s. Dickinson has stated that she left actor Sylvester Stallone for Galotti.

=== Lifestyle and reputation ===
During his peak years in magazine publishing, Galotti was known for his extravagant lifestyle, which included driving a Ferrari, smoking cigars, and maintaining residences in Manhattan and Long Island. He was described as having access to corporate perks including "a car and driver" and country club memberships, with business expenses covering most entertainment costs.

=== Retirement to Vermont ===
Following his departure from GQ in 2003, Galotti sold his New York properties and relocated to an 89-acre farm in North Pomfret, Vermont, around 2004. This relocation marked his permanent retirement from the magazine industry.

== Cultural impact ==
=== Inspiration for "Mr. Big" ===
Galotti is widely recognized as the real-life inspiration for the character of "Mr. Big" (portrayed by Chris Noth) in HBO's Sex and the City, based on Candace Bushnell's book series.

Bushnell, who dated Galotti in the mid-1990s, gave him the "Mr. Big" nickname, explaining: "He was one of those New York guys with a big personality—you just notice him as soon as he walks in the room. I called him Mr Big because he was like a big man on campus." She has described him as "much more of a well-rounded person than you'd think," noting that "he cooks, he gardens. In some ways, he'd prefer to be at home to going out on the town."

The two remain in contact, with Bushnell having stated in interviews that their relationship provided inspiration for her writing about modern dating and relationships in New York City.

== Legacy ==
Galotti's career spanned the golden age of American magazine publishing, during which he helped establish Vanity Fair and Vogue as dominant forces in fashion and culture journalism. His aggressive business style and high-profile lifestyle made him a prominent figure in New York's media elite during the 1980s and 1990s. His influence extended beyond publishing through his inspiration of one of television's most recognizable characters, cementing his place in popular culture.

== See also ==
- Condé Nast
- Talk (magazine)
- Mr. Big (Sex and the City)
- Tina Brown
- Anna Wintour
