= Is There Still Sex in the City? =

2019 novel by Candace Bushnell

Is There Still Sex in the City
- First edition cover
- Author: Candace Bushnell
- Language: English
- Subject: Female midlife dating and relationships
- Genre: Autobiographical novel
- Set in: 21st century New York City
- Publisher: Grove Press
- Publication date: August 1, 2019
- Publication place: United States
- Media type: Print, digital, audio
- Pages: 272
- ISBN: 978-0-8021-4726-4
- OCLC: 1110184244
- Dewey Decimal: 306.709747
- LC Class: HQ801 .B8848 2019
- Preceded by: Killing Monica
- Website: Official website

Is There Still Sex in the City? is a novel written by Candace Bushnell and published in August 2019 by Grove Press. It is based on Bushnell's real-life experiences after divorcing at the age of 50. The title of the book references Sex and the City, a book by Bushnell first published in 1996.

== Plot ==
This book focuses on a new set of characters: Sassy, Kitty, Queenie, Tilda Tia and Marilyn. The book follows the women as they experience mid-life dating and relationships in the 21st century, occurring between a fictional place called "The Village" (based on the real life Hamptons) and Manhattan. This includes adoration from a younger man, experimenting with the dating scene on Tinder, and other explorations.

== Adaptations ==
A television adaptation of the book was sold to series with a script written, but Bushnell said it "fell apart" during the COVID pandemic. Its current status is unknown.

In December, 2021, Candance made her New York Stage Debut in a 1-woman play adaptation at the Daryl Roth Theatre for a limited 12 week run.
