= The Carrie Diaries =

2010 novel by Candace Bushnell

- First edition cover
- Author: Candace Bushnell
- Language: English
- Genre: Young adult fiction
- Published: April 27, 2010
- Publisher: HarperCollins
- Publication place: United States
- Media type: Print (hardcover, paperback) e-Book (Kindle); Audiobook (CD)
- Pages: 400 (hardcover); 416 (paperback)
- ISBN: 0-06-172891-8
- Followed by: Summer and the City

The Carrie Diaries is a young adult novel, the first in a series of the same name by American author Candace Bushnell. The series is a prequel to Bushnell's 1997 collection Sex and the City, and follows the character of Carrie Bradshaw during her senior year of high school during the early 1980s and part of her life in New York City working as a writer. The Los Angeles Times described it as "addictive" and "ingenious."

== Plot summary ==
The Carrie Diaries focuses on Carrie Bradshaw, a high-school student who lives in Castleberry, Connecticut. Carrie is followed through high-school starting her junior year, continuing through the summer, and ending at senior year graduation. Carrie, her friends, and family are shown going through many different trials during this time.

Carrie handles these well, including having a few boyfriends along the way. She and her dad have disagreements but do not come to blows until the end of the book. Carrie's final decision to not attend Brown University contributes to her living with her eventual lifelong friend Samantha Jones. This sets up Carrie as the precedent of a main character in Sex and the City.

== Characters ==
- Carrie Bradshaw: The protagonist of the novel. She is an aspiring writer who dreams of moving to New York City.
- Sebastian Kydd: The handsome, mysterious new kid at school and the love interest of Carrie.
- Donna LaDonna: The school's most popular girl and an aspiring model. She is followed around by two minions, the Jens.
- Lali Kandesie: Carrie's childhood best friend who later becomes her "frenemy".
- Maggie Stevenson: One of Carrie's best friends and Walt's sexually active ex-girlfriend.
- Roberta "The Mouse" Castells: One of Carrie's best friends and the smartest girl in school.
- Walt: One of Carrie's best friends, who dates Maggie before coming out as gay.
- Peter Arnold: One of Maggie's boyfriends, described by Carrie as "the second-smartest boy in our class and kind of a jerk". He is the editor-in-chief of the school newspaper, The Nutmeg, which Carrie later writes for.
- George Carter: Carrie's handsome suitor from New York City and a student at Brown University.
- Dorrit Bradshaw: Carrie's rebellious younger sister.
- Missy Bradshaw: Carrie's middle sister.

== Reception ==
The Carrie Diaries received generally favorable reviews. Joel Ryan of the Los Angeles Times gave the novel a positive review, calling it "addictive" and "ingenious", while asserting that the brilliance of the book is that "sex is really beside the point." Sabrina Rojas Weiss of MTV's Hollywood Crush also gave it a positive review, stating, "All that plot is great and keeps you glued to the page until the end, but what sticks with you later are Carrie's internal musings." Meeta Agrawal of Entertainment Weekly rated the book A− and wrote, "It would have been easy to write a coming-of-age story about Carrie Bradshaw that ham-fistedly foreshadows everything fans of the franchise know will come to pass. But Bushnell nails something harder: telling another chapter in the story of a cherished character that stands on its own."

== Television adaptation ==
In September 2011, it was officially announced that The CW was moving forward with a television series as a prequel to the original series, based on The Carrie Diaries. The project was developed by Gossip Girl producers Josh Schwartz and Stephanie Savage. Former Sex and the City writer Amy B. Harris was tapped to pen the adaptation. On January 18, 2012, The CW network ordered a pilot of The Carrie Diaries. The project was helmed by executive producers Josh Schwartz, Stephanie Savage, Len Goldstein, and Bushnell.

On February 15, 2012, the series' first role was cast when Stefania Owen landed the part of Carrie Bradshaw's 14-year-old sister Dorrit. On February 27, 2012, it was announced that AnnaSophia Robb had won the role of the young Carrie.

The series was formally picked up by The CW on May 11, 2012, and premiered on January 14, 2013. It was renewed for a second season on May 9, 2013. It was canceled on May 8, 2014.
