= Lindsay Price =

American actress and singer (born 1976)

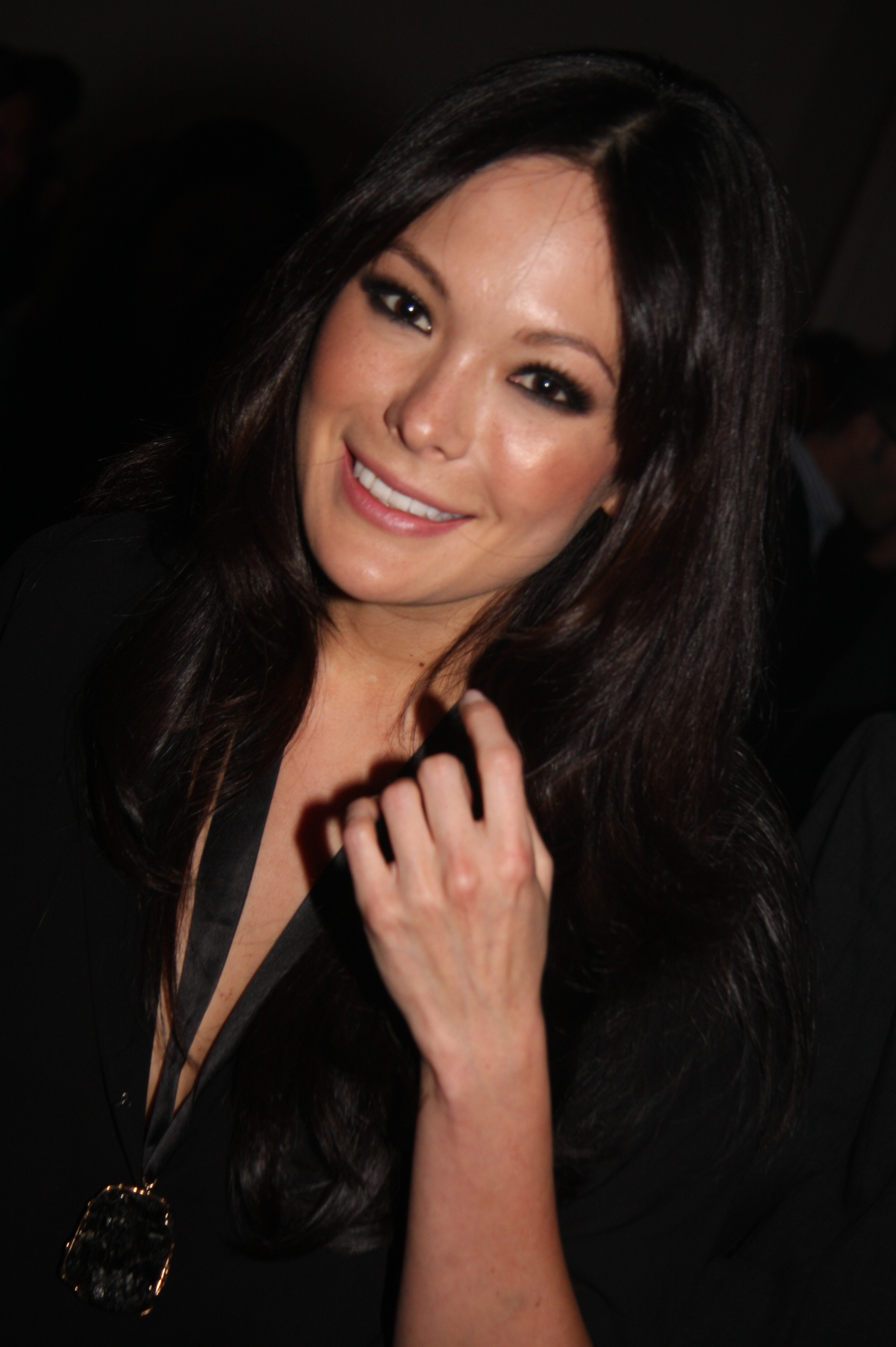
- Price in 2009
- Born: Lindsay Jaylyn Price; December 6, 1976 (age 49); Arcadia, California, U.S.
- Other name: Lindsay Price Stone
- Occupations: Actress; singer
- Years active: 1982–present
- Spouses: Shawn Piller (m. 2004; div. 2007); Curtis Stone (m. 2013)
- Children: 2

Lindsay Jaylyn Price Stone (born December 6, 1976) is an American actress and singer. She is best known for her roles as Janet Sosna on Beverly Hills, 90210 and as Victory Ford on Lipstick Jungle. She is also known for her work on soap operas such as All My Children and The Bold and the Beautiful.

== Early life ==
Price was born in Arcadia, California, to William Price, an American of German and Irish descent, and Haeja Diane Price, who was born in Korea. Price's parents were raised together as siblings, as the family adopted the orphaned Haeja from Korea after the Korean War. Haeja and her biological brother were both abandoned by their mother, who remarried after their father was killed in the war.

In 1982, she appeared in a television commercial for toy retailer Toys "R" Us with fellow child star Jaleel White. She has also appeared in television commercials for Wanda, McDonald's, Vivitar, and Island Fun Barbie. She has appeared on magazine covers for Canada's Avenue and US' Steppin' Out, Fitness, Hamptons, Audrey, and Yellow.

== Career ==
Her first on-screen appearance was as Lan in the episode "Yesterday's Child" of ABC's drama television series Finder of Lost Loves. In 1989, she appeared in an episode of the television series The Wonder Years titled "Walk Out" and an episode of the game show I'm Telling! with her older brother, Bryan. They only missed one question on I'm Telling! and amassed the second-highest score in the show's history. She appeared as An Li Chen on the daytime soap opera All My Children and as Michael Lai on The Bold and the Beautiful.

She joined the cast of Beverly Hills, 90210 in January 1998 as Janet Sosna, a graphic designer at the Beverly Beat newspaper. She remained on the show through its finale in May 2000, appearing in a total of 73 episodes. She then reprised the role as Michael Lai on The Bold and the Beautiful from June to August 2000, April to August 2005, and November 2009. Price had a recurring role on Becker, where she played Amanda, Jake Malinak's (Alex Désert) girlfriend, a role that spanned three seasons.

In 2006, she co-starred on The WB television show Pepper Dennis, opposite Rebecca Romijn, in the role of Kimmy Kim. She appeared in the short-lived American remake of the British series, Coupling, in addition to singing the show's theme song, a cover of "Perhaps, Perhaps, Perhaps". She guest-starred in NCIS for two episodes as a neurotic fling of the main character, Anthony DiNozzo.

From 2008 to 2009, she starred in the NBC drama Lipstick Jungle as Victory Ford, an up-and-coming fashion designer in New York City. She guest-starred in an episode of How I Met Your Mother and played Joanna Frankel in ABC's Eastwick, where she once again starred opposite Rebecca Romijn.

Price has also had a music career. Price wrote and performed on a five-song EP entitled Someone Like Me, which was released in 2007.

== Personal life ==
Price married television producer and director Shawn Piller in July 2004 at a ranch in Malibu. The couple divorced in 2007.

Price began dating Australian celebrity chef Curtis Stone in late 2009. Their son, Hudson Stone, was born on November 6, 2011. Price and Stone became engaged in July 2012 and married on June 8, 2013, in Spain. Their second son, Emerson Spencer, was born on September 16, 2014.

== Filmography ==
=== Film ===
Year	Title	Role	Notes
1988	Purple People Eater	Kory Kamimoto	
1995	Angus	Recycling Girl	
1997	Jesus Rides Shotgun	Beer Girl	
1998	Hundred Percent	Cleveland	
1999	Taking the Plunge		Short film
1999	The Big Split	Tracy's Friend	
2001	No Turning Back	Soid	
2004	Club Dread	Yu	
2005	Waterborne	Jasmine	
2008	Elevator People Bring You Up When You're Feeling Down	Gwen	Short film
2009	Lonely Street	Felicia Quattlebaum	

=== Television ===
Year	Title	Role	Notes
1984	Finder of Lost Loves	Lan	Episode: "Yesterday's Child"
1985	Airwolf	Frightened Child	Episode: "The American Dream"
1986	Hotel	Kim Lan	Episode: "Facades"
1986	Newhart	Ranger Girl	Episode: "Camp Stephanie"
1987	My Two Dads	Annie	Episode: "'Tis the Season"
1988	A Place at the Table	Student	TV movie
1989	Family Medical Center	Alana Yu	Episode: "The Yu Family"
1989	The Wonder Years	Lori	Episode: "Walk Out"
1991	Plymouth	April Mathewson	TV movie
1991	Life Goes On	Drama Student #2	Episode: "Life After Death"
1991	Parker Lewis Can't Lose	Cheyenne Thomas	Episode: "Boy Meets Girl"
1991–1993	All My Children	An Li Chen Bodine	Recurring role
1993	Boy Meets World	Linda	Episode: "Teacher's Bet"
1994	ABC Afterschool Special	Laurie	Episode: "Boys Will Be Boys"
1994	Days of Our Lives	Mary	Unknown episodes
1995–1997	The Bold and the Beautiful	Michael Lai	Recurring role
1996	Maybe This Time	Veronica	Episode: "St. Valentine's Day Massacre"
1997	Head Over Heels		Episode: "Spider Guy"
1998	Frasier	Sharon	Episode: "The Perfect Guy"
1998	C-16: FBI	Rita	Episode: "Green Card"
1998–2000	Beverly Hills, 90210	Janet Sosna	Main role
2001	The Heart Department	Juliet Lee	TV movie
2001	Jack & Jill	Emily Cantor	Recurring role
2001	CSI: Crime Scene Investigation	Kim Marita	Episode: "Alter Boys"
2001–2003	Becker	Amanda	Episodes: "Jake's Jaunt," "It Had to Be Ew" & "Thank You for Not Smoking"
2002	The Dead Zone	Dr. Sharon Weizak	Episode: "Netherworld"
2003	Coupling	Jane Honda	Main role
2004	The Mountain	Vanessa	Episode: "Best Laid Plans"
2004	Las Vegas	Mia Duncan	Episode: "Montecito Lancers"
2004–2005	NCIS	Navy Lt. Pam Kim	Episodes: "Forced Entry," "Frame Up"
2005	Kitchen Confidential	Audrey	Episode: "Aftermath"
2006	Pepper Dennis	Kimmy Kim	Recurring role
2007	How I Met Your Mother	Cathy	Episode: "Spoiler Alert"
2008	Secrets of the Summer House	Nikki Wickersham	TV movie
2008–2009	Lipstick Jungle	Victory Ford	Main role
2009–2010	Eastwick	Joanna Frankel	Main role
2010	Who Gets the Parents	Brenda	TV movie
2011	CSI: NY	Kate Price	Episode: "Vigilante"
2011	Love Bites	Liz	Episodes: "Unaired Pilot", "Firsts"
2012	Two and a Half Men	Whitney	Episode: "Avoid the Chinese Mustard"
2013	Hawaii Five-0	Leilani	Episodes: "Olelo HoʻOpaʻI Make" & "Hoa Pili", "Pukana"
2014	Lifesaver	Dr. Jennifer Maguire	TV movie
2014	Major Crimes	Gloria Lim	Episodes: "Two Options" & "Special Master: Part Two"
2015	How We Live	Claudia Kaplan	TV movie
2015	Black-ish	Maisie	Episode: "The Real World"
2015	Castle	Lindsay Trent	Episode: "The Last Seduction"
2016	Mary + Jane	Veronique	Episode: "Neighborhood Watch"
2018–2019	Splitting Up Together	Camille	Main cast
2020	Celebrity Watch Party	Herself	
2021	Atypical	Sasha Taylor	Episodes: "Dead Dreams" & "Are You in Fair Health?"

=== Video Games ===
Year	Title	Role	Notes
2012	Sleeping Dogs	Peggy Li	
