= One Fifth Avenue (novel) =

Book by Candace Bushnell

First edition (publ. Hyperion Books)

One Fifth Avenue is a 2008 novel by Candace Bushnell about the residents of the prestigious building. Its characters include a middle aged screenwriter, a novelist with a bad marriage, and a hedge fund manager's wife.

"With a breezy pace that brings to mind a Gilded Age comedy of manners, the novel might not have anything new to say about New York society, but there are enough twists to keep it fun," wrote an anonymous critic in Kirkus Reviews. Reviewing the book in The New York Times, Henry Alford wrote, "There are pleasures to be found here," highlighted by "sexual tension and the striving for success." But he concluded, "What's missing is the kind of stylistic flourish or flight of imagination that would make the proceedings memorable. Bushnell's prose here is rarely ever more than workmanlike, and I'm hard-pressed to recall any passage that bears repeating."
