= Summer and the City =

2011 novel by Candace Bushnell

- Author: Candace Bushnell
- Language: English
- Genre: Young adult
- Publisher: Harper Collins Publishers
- Publication date: April 26, 2011
- Publication place: United States
- Media type: Print (hardcover)
- Pages: 416 pp (first edition)
- ISBN: 0-06-172893-4
- Preceded by: The Carrie Diaries

Summer and the City is a young-adult novel written by American author Candace Bushnell. The sequel to The Carrie Diaries and the prequel to Sex and the City, it was first released as a hardcover on April 26, 2011.

== Synopsis ==
Picking up where The Carrie Diaries left off, seventeen-year-old Carrie Bradshaw has left her hometown and treks to New York City. Set during the summer before her freshman year at Brown, Carrie learns to navigate her way through the Big Apple, takes a writing class at The New School, and even pursues a relationship with an older man. Joining her along the way, she meets Samantha Jones, a true Manhattan fashionista who's determined on the path of fame and fortune, and the opinionated feminist Miranda Hobbes who is a freshman at New York University.

== Characters ==
- Carrie Bradshaw – The high-spirited protagonist of the novel. She is whisked away to New York with dreams of becoming a writer.
- Samantha Jones - The fashionista that can call herself Carrie's best friend. They were introduced by Donna LaDonna, Samantha's cousin.
- Miranda Hobbes - A feminist who meets Carrie after finding her bag in the trash and returning it to her.
