= Candace Bushnell =

American author, journalist, and producer

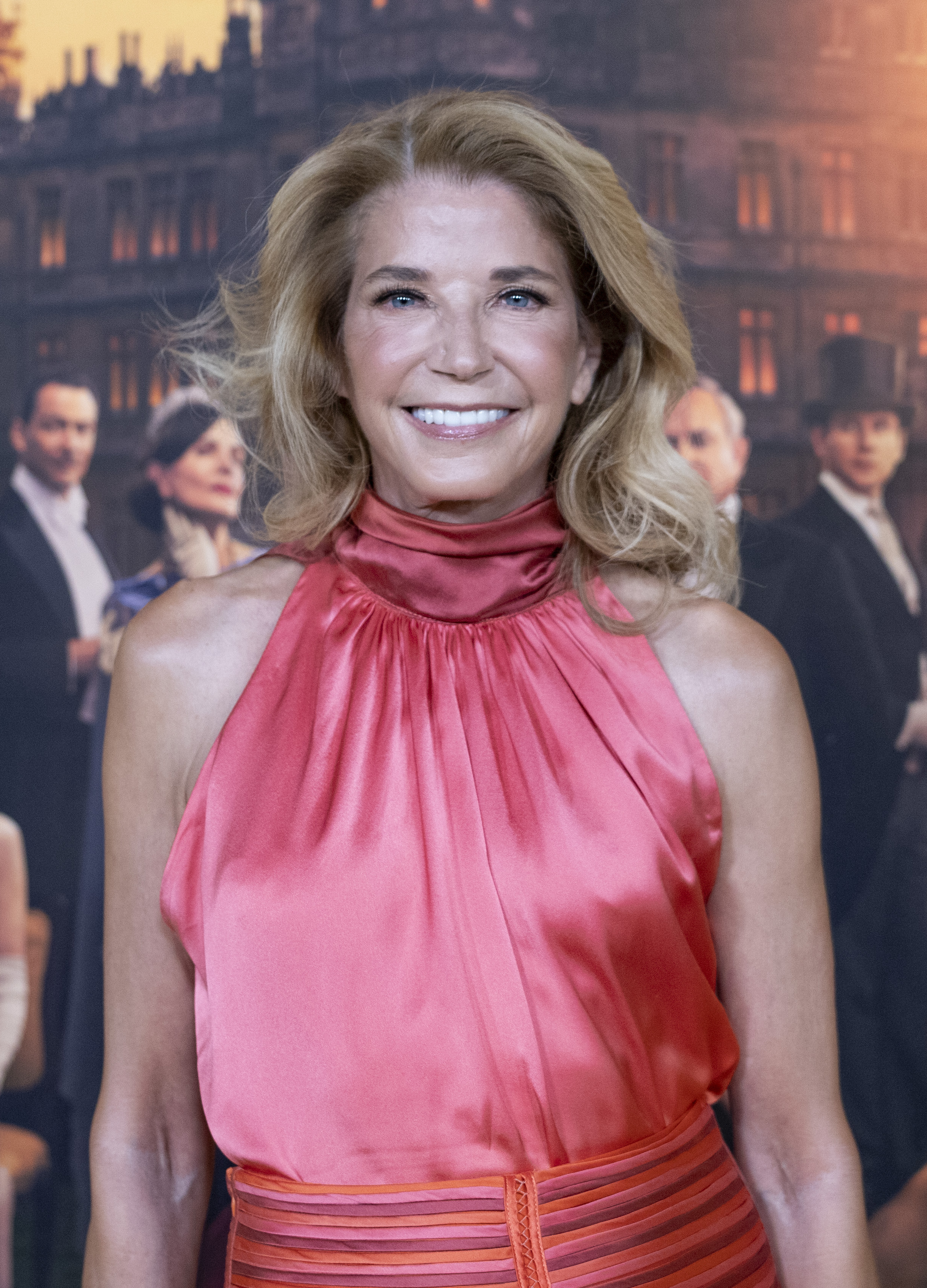
- Bushnell in 2025
- Born: December 1, 1958 (age 67); Glastonbury, Connecticut, U.S.
- Education: Rice University; New York University
- Occupations: Author; journalist; television producer
- Spouse: Charles Askegard (m. 2002; div. 2011)
- Website: candacebushnell.com

Candace Bushnell (born December 1, 1958) is an American author, journalist, and television producer. She wrote a column for The New York Observer (1994–96) that was adapted into the bestselling Sex and the City anthology. The book was the basis for the HBO hit series Sex and the City (1998–2004) and two subsequent movies.

Bushnell followed this with the international bestselling novels 4 Blondes (2001), Trading Up (2003), Lipstick Jungle (2005), One Fifth Avenue (2008), The Carrie Diaries (2010) and Summer and the City (2011). Two of her novels have been adapted for television: Lipstick Jungle (2008–09) on NBC, and The Carrie Diaries (2013–2014) on The CW. One Fifth Avenue has been optioned by the Mark Gordon Company and ABC for another television show.

== Early life ==
Bushnell was born in Glastonbury, Connecticut. She is the daughter of Calvin L. Bushnell and Camille Salonia. Her father was one of the inventors of the air-cooled hydrogen fuel cell used in the Apollo space missions in the 1960s. Her Bushnell ancestors in the U.S. can be traced to Francis Bushnell, a signatory of the Guilford Covenant, who emigrated from Thatcham, Berkshire, England, in 1639. Her mother was of Italian descent.

While attending Glastonbury High School, Candace was accompanied to her senior prom by Mike O'Meara, later a nationally syndicated radio host, who also dated Candace's sister, Lolly. She attended Rice University and New York University. She moved to New York in the late 1970s and frequented Studio 54. In 1995, she met publishing executive Ron Galotti, who became the inspiration for Sex and the City's Mr. Big.

== Career ==
At age 19, Bushnell moved to New York City and sold a children's story (which was never published) to Simon & Schuster. She continued writing and worked as a freelance journalist for various publications, struggling to make ends meet for many years. Bushnell began writing for The New York Observer in 1993. She created a humorous column for the paper (1994–1996) called "Sex and the City", based on her dating experiences and those of her friends. In 1997, Bushnell's columns were published in an anthology, also called Sex and the City, and soon became the basis for the popular HBO television series of the same name. The series aired from 1998 to 2004, and starred Sarah Jessica Parker as Carrie Bradshaw, a socially active New York City sex and lifestyles columnist, a character whom Bushnell has said was her alter ego. The series entered syndication and was also made into two films: Sex and the City (2008) and Sex and the City 2 (2010). A third film was announced in December 2016, but was canceled and replaced by the sequel miniseries And Just Like That…, on HBO Max. Bushnell went on to publish several international and The New York Times bestselling novels including Four Blondes, Trading Up, Lipstick Jungle and One Fifth Avenue.

In 2005, Bushnell served as one of three judges for the reality television show Wickedly Perfect on CBS. She began hosting a live weekly talk show on Sirius Satellite Radio in 2007. The show, called "Sex, Success and Sensibility," was canceled in late 2008 after the merger of Sirius and XM Satellite Radio, when Bushnell was asked to continue the show with a 50% pay cut and refused. Bushnell won the 2006 Matrix Award for books, and the Albert Einstein Spirit of Achievement Award. In 2009 she wrote a comedic web series, The Broadroom, about women over 40 dealing with workplace issues. It starred Jennie Garth and was created in partnership with the magazine publisher Meredith Corporation's Meredith 360 division.

Bushnell's 2005 novel Lipstick Jungle was adapted for television and aired on NBC in 2008. The series Lipstick Jungle starred Brooke Shields and ran for 20 episodes. In 2009, Bushnell wrote articles for Meredith's More magazine.

In 2008, HarperCollins contracted Bushnell to write two books for young adults about Carrie Bradshaw's high school years. The first of these, The Carrie Diaries, was published in 2010. The other, Summer and the City (Carrie Diaries Series #2), was published in 2011. The Carrie Diaries was a number one New York Times Bestseller.

In 2012, Bushnell was sued in federal court by her former friend and manager Clifford Streit (who inspired the Sex and the City character Stanford Blatch), who claimed that Bushnell reneged on a settlement in which she agreed to pay him 7.5% of anything she earned from the Sex and the City TV series and the two Sex and the City movies, an amount Streit estimated was at least $150,000.

== Personal life ==
From 2002 to 2011, Bushnell was married to Charles Askegard, a principal dancer with the New York City Ballet who was ten years her junior, and whom she had met eight weeks before. They divorced in 2011. She found the experience disorienting, telling The Guardian, "When I got divorced, I couldn’t get a mortgage; I didn’t fit into a computer model. All of a sudden, I was invited to no more couple things. Being single is hard and there’s something a bit heroic about it."

She owned a co-op in Greenwich Village until 2015. From 2005 to 2016 she owned a historic Victorian farmhouse in Roxbury, Connecticut. In 2016, she bought a co-op on East 74th Street in Manhattan.

== Bibliography ==
- (1996): Sex and the City, ISBN 9053339876
- (2000): 4 Blondes, ISBN 9041760261 nur 302
- (2003): Trading Up
- (2005): Lipstick Jungle, ISBN 9789044610482
- (2008): One Fifth Avenue
- (2010): The Carrie Diaries
- (2011): Summer and the City
- (2015): Killing Monica
- (2019): Is There Still Sex in the City?, ISBN 9780802147264
