= Talk (magazine) =

American magazine (1999–2002)

- Editor: Tina Brown
- Total circulation: 670,000 (2002)
- Founder: Tina Brown
- Founded: July 1998; 27 years ago
- First issue: September 1999; 26 years ago
- Final issue: February 2002; 24 years ago
- Company: Talk Media; (Miramax); Hearst Magazines; (Hearst)
- Country: United States
- Language: English
- Website: talkmagazine.com (defunct)

Talk was an American magazine founded in July 1998 and published from September 1999 to February 2002. It gained notoriety for its celebrity profiles and interviews, The magazine was a joint venture of Miramax's Talk Media, which was in charge of advertising sales, editorial content, and marketing, and Hearst Magazines, which managed printing, circulation, newsstand distribution, and subscription fulfillment.

== History and profile ==
Talk Media was founded in July 1998 by Miramax Films, former New Yorker editor Tina Brown and Ron Galotti to publish books, the Talk magazine and to produce television programs. Talk Media formed a joint venture with Hearst Magazines for the magazine only in February 1999.

The first issue of Talk appeared in September 1999. The cover story of the debut issue was an interview with Hillary Clinton, which took place shortly after the Clinton–Lewinsky scandal, in which she explained that her husband Bill Clinton had a chronic need to please women. The Washington Post reported that at times, "Talk seemed more interested in promoting such Miramax stars as Gwyneth Paltrow than in politics."

The magazine never became a commercial success, and its publication was suspended after the final February 2002 issue. Politico estimated that Brown had "bombed through some US$50 million in 2 1/2 years" on the failed venture. A $1 million contract settlement in 2002 ended Brown's involvement in Talk Media.
