= Sex and the City season 2 =

Sex and the City
- Season 2
- Promotional poster
- No. of episodes: 18

Release
- Original network: HBO
- Original release: June 6 – October 3, 1999

Season chronology
- ← Previous; Season 1 Next → Season 3

The second season of Sex and the City, an American television romantic comedy-drama, aired in the United States on HBO from June 6 to October 3, 1999. Based on the eponymous book written by Candace Bushnell, the series was created by Darren Star and produced by Darren Star Productions, HBO Original Programming, and Warner Bros. Television. Star, Barry Josen and Michael Patrick King served as the series' executive producers. The show follows the relationships and sexual escapades of Carrie Bradshaw, a sex columnist for the fictional New York Star, and her friends Samantha Jones, Charlotte York and Miranda Hobbes.

Season two, comprising 18 episodes, aired on Sunday nights at 9:00 p.m. Eastern Time Zone. The season garnered a more positive reception from critics. The second season saw a rise in ratings from the previous season, averaging a total of nine million viewers. The show continued its award success in season two, garnering various major award nominations for the main cast and the series, including a Golden Globe Award win for Parker.

== Episodes ==
No. overall	No. in season	Title	Directed by	Written by	Original release date	Prod. code
13	1	"Take Me Out to the Ballgame"	Allen Coulter	Michael Patrick King	June 6, 1999	201
Carrie meets "the new Yankee", Joe, at a baseball game, all the while preparing for her first post-breakup encounter with Big. Miranda gets fed up with the girls always talking about men. Charlotte dates a guy named Paul Ericson who has a tendency to adjust his package a lot. Samantha gets frustrated with James's "deficiencies".
14	2	"The Awful Truth"	Allen Coulter	Darren Star	June 13, 1999	202
Carrie accidentally suggests that her friend Susan Sharon leave her domineering, violent husband. Miranda builds up the courage to talk dirty in bed. Charlotte tries to replace the perfect man with the perfect dog. Samantha gets dragged to couples therapy with James and tries to avoid talking about her real problem with their sex life.
15	3	"The Freak Show"	Allen Coulter	Jenny Bicks	June 20, 1999	203
Carrie turns freakish herself after dating a string of freaky guys and freaks out the very normal Ben when trying to discover his secret freakiness. Miranda dates "Manhattan Guy," a guy who hasn't left Manhattan in ten years. Charlotte dates the renowned "Mr. Pussy" and tries to make a real relationship out of it. Samantha decides to get plastic surgery and freaks out during the consult.
16	4	"They Shoot Single People, Don't They?"	John David Coles	Michael Patrick King	June 27, 1999	204
Single and fabulous Carrie gets a horrible photo taken for the cover story of New York Magazine: Single and Fabulous...?. Miranda fakes orgasms with her current boyfriend. Charlotte starts dating her handyman. Samantha dates a club owner, who calls them a "we" right away.
17	5	"Four Women and a Funeral"	Allen Coulter	Jenny Bicks	July 4, 1999	205
Carrie starts seeing Mr. Big again. Miranda buys her own apartment on the Upper West Side. Charlotte meets a recent widower at a cemetery. Samantha's actions with a married man gets her in trouble with the New York high-society "ladies who lunch" and only a Titanic star can help her out.
18	6	"The Cheating Curve"	John David Coles	Darren Star	July 11, 1999	206
Carrie starts to "officially" date Mr. Big again. Miranda dates a guy who insists on watching porn while they have sex. Fed up with cheating men, Charlotte spends time with her new friends, the "Power Lesbians." Samantha starts dating her gym instructor who "brands" her with a lightning bolt. Paintings from the opening art gallery scene are by New York Artist Sally Davies.
19	7	"The Chicken Dance"	Victoria Hochberg	Cindy Chupack	July 18, 1999	207
Carrie gets fed up with Big's inability to pay attention to her. Miranda inadvertently sets her interior designer up with a long-distance would-be boyfriend, and they marry after only four weeks. Charlotte has a "warp speed" relationship with a guy she meets at the wedding. Samantha is upset when she experiences "déjà-screw": sleeping with a guy she previously did fifteen years ago.
20	8	"The Man, The Myth, The Viagra"	Victoria Hochberg	Michael Patrick King	July 25, 1999	208
A frustrated Carrie tries to get Big to make time to meet the girls. Miranda meets Steve Brady, a cute bartender who wants to be more than a one-night stand. Samantha dates an incredibly wealthy man in his seventies with a sumptuous lifestyle and a pocket full of Viagra. In a fifth-season look back at the best of the first four seasons, the St. Paul Pioneer Press named this episode #5 on its list of 10 essential Sex and the City episodes, observing "If you're puzzled by the pull the often-slimy Mr. Big has over Carrie, this episode reveals his charm."
21	9	"Old Dogs, New Dicks" "Old Dogs, New Tricks"	Alan Taylor	Jenny Bicks	August 1, 1999	209
Carrie tries to get Big to stop checking out other women when they're together. Miranda and Steve's opposite schedules become a problem. Charlotte is turned off when she dates a man who has not been circumcised and Samantha runs into an old hockey-player boyfriend who is now a blonde drag queen named Samantha.
22	10	"The Caste System"	Allison Anders	Darren Star	August 8, 1999	210
Carrie gets fed up with high society while at an Upper East Side party with Big. Miranda and Steve have an argument over money and social status. Charlotte meets Wiley Ford, the movie star and joins his entourage. Samantha dates a wealthy real-estate developer with a Southeast Asian live-in servant who has her master wrapped around her little finger.
23	11	"Evolution"	Pam Thomas	Cindy Chupack	August 15, 1999	211
Carrie tries to leave her mark at Big's place by leaving some personal items behind. Miranda finds out that one of her ovaries has stopped producing eggs. Charlotte dates Stefan, a pastry chef who she mistakenly thought was gay but is, in his own words, a "gay straight man". Samantha tries to get revenge on Dominic, her ex who broke her heart.
24	12	"La Douleur Exquise!"	Allison Anders	Ollie Levy & Michael Patrick King	August 22, 1999	212
Carrie is horrified when Big casually tells her he's moving to Paris for seven months. Miranda dates a man who only wants to have sex in places where they might get caught. Charlotte meets Buster, a high-end shoe salesman with a serious foot fetish. Samantha introduces the girls to a hot new S&M restaurant.
25	13	"Games People Play"	Michael Spiller	Jenny Bicks	August 29, 1999	213
Carrie starts going to therapy after obsessing about Big for too long. Offended by the diagnosis of dating men who are wrong for her, she dates cute fellow-patient Seth (Jon Bon Jovi), a guy who loses interest in women after sleeping with them. Miranda plays "peek-a-boo" with her cute across-the-airshaft neighbor. Samantha dates a sports fanatic whose mood depends on who won the game that night.
26	14	"The Fuck Buddy" "The Sex Buddy"	Alan Taylor	Darren Star	September 5, 1999	214
Carrie tries to make a relationship with her "fuck buddy." Miranda dates a condescending lawyer. Charlotte becomes a free-wheeling dater and double-books dates with two guys on the same night. Samantha overhears the couple moaning next door, and decides to outdo them.
27	15	"Shortcomings"	Dan Algrant	Terri Minsky	September 12, 1999	215
Carrie dates an author who has a premature ejaculation problem and finds that she regrets having to break up with his perfect family. Miranda dates a divorced father who has a young son. Charlotte's brother Wesley stays with her after his wife leaves him. Samantha gives Wesley what he really needs: sex. Notes: Second guest star appearance of Justin Theroux as a different character.
28	16	"Was It Good For You?"	Dan Algrant	Michael Patrick King	September 19, 1999	216
Carrie dates a recovering alcoholic who becomes obsessed with her. Charlotte is determined to learn how to have good sex after her latest partner falls asleep on her, and drags the girls to a Tantric sex class. Samantha gets an offer to have a threesome with two curious gay friends. In 2007, this episode was in the news for being part of research conducted by Ellie Parker and Adrian Furnham of the Department of Psychology at University College London. In a study released online in advance of its publication in Applied Cognitive Psychology, Parker and Furnham investigated an audience's ability to recall advertisements under varying circumstances. In comparing advertisements placed in "Was It Good For You?" vs. those placed in an episode of Malcolm in the Middle, the researchers discovered that "programs heavy on sexual content actually lead to less recall of ads that appear in commercial breaks" and that sex was only an effective tool for selling to men.
29	17	"Twenty-Something Girls vs. Thirty-Something Women"	Darren Star	Darren Star	September 26, 1999	217
Carrie unexpectedly runs into Mr. Big—and his new 20-something girlfriend, Natasha—at a Hamptons party. Miranda tries in vain to have some mature fun in the Hamptons. Charlotte pretends to be 27 so she can date a cute 26-year-old named Greg. Samantha's 25-year-old former assistant is hired to throw a big Hamptons party using her Rolodex for the guest list.
30	18	"Ex and the City"	Michael Patrick King	Michael Patrick King	October 3, 1999	218
After learning of Big's engagement, a freaked-out Carrie tries to cope with the ramifications. Miranda sleeps with Steve for the first time after their breakup. Charlotte tries to overcome her fear of horseback riding. Samantha dates a guy who's "Mr. Too-Big", determined to overcome his over-endowment.

== Production ==
The second season of Sex and the City was created by Darren Star and produced by Darren Star Productions and Warner Bros. Television, in association with HBO Original Programming. The series is based on the book of the same name, written by Candace Bushnell, which contains stories from her column with the New York Observer. The show features production from Barry Jossen, Michael Patrick King, and Star. Season two featured writing credits from Star, King, Jenny Bicks, Cindy Chupack, Ollie Levy, and Terri Minsky. The season was directed by Alan Algrant, Allison Anders, John David Coles, Allan Coulter, Victoria Hochberg, Nicole Holofcener, Michael Spiller, and Alan Taylor.

== Cast and characters ==
Season two featured four actors receiving star billing. Sarah Jessica Parker played the lead character Carrie Bradshaw, a writer of a sex column, "Sex and the City", for the fictional New York Star newspaper and the narrator of the series. Kim Cattrall portrayed Samantha Jones, a sexually confident public relations agent who follows the same relationship rules that men do. Kristin Davis played Charlotte York, an optimistic art museum curator who holds traditional views on relationships. Cynthia Nixon portrayed Miranda Hobbes, an acerbic lawyer with a pessimistic outlook on relationship and a distrust of men.

The season featured a number of recurring guest appearances. Chris Noth appeared as the slick, elusive business man and Carrie's love interest known as Mr. Big. Willie Garson portrayed Carrie's gay best friend and talent manager Stanford Blatch. David Eigenberg appears as bartender and Miranda's love interest Steve Brady. Ben Weber played Skipper Johnson, Carrie's friend and Miranda's on-off friend with benefits.

== Reception ==
=== Critical reception ===
The second season averaged a total viewership of 9 million viewers, up from last season's average of 6.9 million. Lloyd Paseman of Eugene Register-Guard gave the series a 4 star (out of 5) rating, praising the ensemble performance by the cast, the realistic nature of the characters and the writing. Terry Kelleher of People Weekly wrote a positive review, stating that the series is funnier in season two due to Miranda's choice in men. Kelleher then deemed it "The Man Show's smarter flip side."

The episode Old Dogs, New Dicks has been criticised for promoting circumcision and stigmatising uncircumcised men. An Australian man on Reddit claimed that aged 21, watching the episode caused him to get circumcised, something he regards as "the biggest mistake he ever made" and vowed to never watch the show or the sequel And Just Like That… ever again.

=== Awards and nominations ===
At the 57th Golden Globe Awards, Sex and the City won the award for Best Television Series – Musical or Comedy while Sarah Jessica Parker won the award for Best Actress – Television Series Musical or Comedy. Kim Cattrall and Cynthia Nixon received nominations for Best Supporting Actress – Series, Miniseries or Television Film. Recurring cast member Chris Noth was also nominated for the Golden Globe Award for Best Supporting Actor – Series, Miniseries or Television Film. At the 2000 American Comedy Awards, Parker was nominated for Funniest Female Performer in a TV Series (Leading Role) Network, Cable or Syndication while Kristin Davis was nominated for Funniest Supporting Female Performer in a TV Series. Parker also received a nomination for the Screen Actors Guild Award for Outstanding Performance by a Female Actor in a Comedy Series. The series received a nomination for Best Television Series – Musical or Comedy at the 4th Golden Satellite Awards.

At the Writers Guild of America Awards 1999, the series was nominated for the award for Television: Episodic Comedy with episodes "Ex and the City" and "Four Women and the Funeral". For "The Man, The Myth, The Viagra", Victoria Hochberg was nominated for the award for Outstanding Directing – Comedy Series at the 52nd Directors Guild of America Awards. Sex and the City received nominations for Program of the Year and TCA Award for Outstanding Achievement in Comedy at the 16th TCA Awards. At the 52nd Primetime Emmy Awards, the series was nominated for nine awards, including a second nomination for Outstanding Comedy Series and Outstanding Lead Actress in a Comedy Series for Parker. Cattrall also received her first nomination for Outstanding Supporting Actress in a Comedy Series while writers and executive producers Cindy Chupack and Michael Patrick King received nods for Outstanding Writing for a Comedy Series for their respective episodes.

== Home media release ==
Sex and the City: The Complete Second Season
Set details		Special features
18 episodes; 3-disc set (DVD); 1.33:1 aspect ratio; Subtitles: English, French; English: Dolby Digital 2.0 Surround; Spanish: Dolby Digital 2.0 Mono		Episode Summaries (text); Featurette (8:22); Season 1 Promo Spot (0:28); Season 2 Promo Spot (0:31); Episode Previews (between 0:30 and 0:49 each); Cast & Filmmakers (5 cast members, 2 producers - Text); Season Index (Text); Awards & Nominations (Text); DVD-ROM material
DVD release date
Region 1	Region 2	Region 4
May 22, 2001	July 1, 2002	October 2, 2008
