= To Market, to Market (Sex and the City) =

- Sex and the City episode
- Episode no.: Season 6 Episode 1
- Directed by: Michael Patrick King
- Written by: Michael Patrick King
- Production code: 601
- Original air date: June 22, 2003

Guest appearances
- David Eigenberg as Steve Brady; Ron Livingston as Jack Berger; Evan Handler as Harry Goldenblatt; John Corbett as Aidan Shaw; Victor Webster as Chip Kil-Kinney; Wallace Langham as Willie

Episode chronology
← Previous "I Love a Charade"	Next → "Great Sexpectations"
- Sex and the City (season 6)

"To Market, to Market" is the first episode of the sixth and final season of the American romantic sit-com Sex and the City, and the 75th episode overall. Carrie draws a comparison between the stock market and relationships ("Why do we keep investing?") inspired by her trip to ring the opening bell for the New York Stock Exchange after her newspaper, The New York Star, goes public.

== Plot ==
Carrie anxiously contemplates her first date with Jack Berger, while Charlotte considers the consequences of falling for her Jewish divorce lawyer, who insists he can only marry a fellow Jew; Miranda recognizes that she belongs with Steve, but resists her urge just long enough to discover he has moved on; and Samantha tries to get over Richard by resuming her promiscuous ways, this time with a stockbroker who has moved into her building.

== Reception ==
Reviewer Tom Shales of the Washington Post praised the episode highly for highlighting the show's metamorphosis over six seasons "from a simple comedy into something more engagingly complex — a drama-comedy, a dramedy, a commedrome, a dromedary, or whatever term might have to be invented to describe it. What counts is that a faithful viewer's emotional investment in the characters grows with each new season." The New York Sun's critic, on the other hand, expressed surprise at how unengaging the episode proved to be, predicting "After episode one, 'To Market, to Market,' only the rabid diehards will fail to share my sense of sadness at the direction Sex and the City seems to be taking in its final year." The reviewer expressed particular disappointment with Carrie's continuing failure to commit, noting that actress Sarah Jessica Parker had vehemently opposed her character's breakup with fiancé Aidan, and also what he viewed as misuse of Kim Cattrall's "great and underrated talent" by removing Samantha's first true love story and driving "this wondrous character [to] return to her shallowest roots." Entertainment Weekly rated the episode B+ — together with episode two — summing up, "Though they don't rank among the series' best, the first pair of episodes rather slyly and elegantly acknowledge that it's time for the show — and its fans — to move on."
