= Sex and the City season 3 =

Season of American television series

Sex and the City
- Season 3
- Promotional poster
- No. of episodes: 18

Release
- Original network: HBO
- Original release: June 4 – October 15, 2000

Season chronology
- ← Previous; Season 2 Next → Season 4

The third season of Sex and the City, an American television romantic comedy-drama, aired in the United States on HBO from June 4 to October 15, 2000. Based on the eponymous book written by Candace Bushnell, the series was created by Darren Star and produced by Darren Star Productions, HBO Original Programming, and Warner Bros. Television. Star, Barry Josen and Michael Patrick King served as the series' executive producers. The show follows the relationships and sexual escapades of Carrie Bradshaw, a sex columnist for the fictional New York Star, and her friends Samantha Jones, Charlotte York and Miranda Hobbes.

Season three saw a more serialized approach to the series. Carrie begins dating Aidan Shaw, a furniture craftsman who stands as a polar opposite to Mr. Big, who struggles in his marriage to Natasha as well as seeing Carrie with someone else. Miranda and Steve move in with each other but find themselves going in different directions in terms of maturity. Charlotte dates and later marries Trey McDougal, who turns out to be impotent.

Season three, comprising 18 episodes, aired on Sunday nights at 9:00 p.m. Eastern Time Zone. The third season saw a rise in ratings from the previous season. The show garnered acclaim in its third season, winning the Best Comedy Series awards at the Primetime Emmy Awards and Golden Globe Awards and the Screen Actors Guild Award for Outstanding Performance by an Ensemble in a Comedy Series.

== Production ==
The third season of Sex and the City was created by Darren Star and produced by Darren Star Productions and Warner Bros. Television, in association with HBO Original Programming. The series is based on the book of the same name, written by Candace Bushnell, which contains stories from her column with the New York Observer. The show features production from Barry Jossen, Michael Patrick King, and Star. Season three featured writing credits from Star, King, Jenny Bicks, Cindy Chupack, Becky Hartman Edwards, and Allan Heinberg. The season was directed by Dan Algrant, Allison Anders, John David Coles, Allan Coulter, Dennis Erdman, Nicole Holofcener, Charles McDougall, Michael Spiller, and Pam Thomas.

== Cast and characters ==
Season three featured four actors receiving star billing. Sarah Jessica Parker played the lead character Carrie Bradshaw, a writer of a sex column, "Sex and the City", for a fictional magazine and the narrator of the series. Kim Cattrall portrayed Samantha Jones, a sexually confident public relations agent who follows the same relationship rules that men do. Kristin Davis played Charlotte York, an optimistic art museum curator who holds traditional views on relationships. Cynthia Nixon portrayed Miranda Hobbes, an acerbic lawyer with a pessimistic outlook on relationships and a distrust of men.

The season featured a number of recurring guest appearances. Chris Noth reprises his role as Mr. Big, who is currently married to Natasha Naginsky (Bridget Moynahan). Willie Garson portrayed Carrie's gay best friend and talent manager Stanford Blatch. David Eigenberg appears as Steve Brady, a bartender and Miranda's love interest. John Corbett played Aidan Shaw, a laid-back furniture designer who becomes Carrie's long-term boyfriend. Kyle MacLachlan of Twin Peaks fame joined the series portraying Charlotte's boyfriend and later husband Trey MacDougal, a cardiologist from a wealthy family whose marriage to Charlotte is plagued by his impotence and his intruding mother. Frances Sternhagen recurred during the season as Trey's mother Bunny.

== Reception ==
Primetime Emmy Awards record
- 1. Outstanding Comedy Series

Golden Globe Awards record
- 1. Best Television Series – Musical or Comedy
- 2. Best Actress – Television Series Musical or Comedy (Sarah Jessica Parker)

Screen Actors Guild Awards record
- 1. Outstanding Performance by an Ensemble in a Comedy Series

Sex and the City received various awards and nominations during its third season. At the 58th Golden Globe Awards, the series received four nominations, winning two for Best Television Series – Musical or Comedy and Best Actress – Television Series Musical or Comedy, awarded to Sarah Jessica Parker. Kim Cattrall and Cynthia Nixon received their second nominations for Best Supporting Actress – Series, Miniseries or Television Film. At the 53rd Primetime Emmy Awards, the show received ten nominations, including a third nomination for Outstanding Lead Actress in a Comedy Series for Parker and a second nomination for Outstanding Supporting Actress in a Comedy Series for Cattrall. The series won the award for Outstanding Comedy Series.

At the 7th Screen Actors Guild Awards, Cattrall and Parker received nominations for Outstanding Performance by a Female Actor in a Comedy Series while the cast won the award for Outstanding Performance by an Ensemble in a Comedy Series. The show also won Best Television Series – Musical or Comedy at the 6th Golden Satellite Awards, while receiving nominations for Outstanding Achievement in Comedy at the 17th TCA Awards, the Award for Television: Episodic Comedy at the 53rd WGA Awards for episodes "Attack of the 5' 10" Woman" (written by Cindy Chupack) and "Ex and the City" (written by Michael Patrick King), and Outstanding Directing – Comedy Series at the 53rd Directors Guild of America Awards for "Cock a Doodle Do!" (directed by Allen Coulter), among others.

== Episodes ==
No. overall	No. in season	Title	Directed by	Written by	Original release date	Prod. code	U.S. viewers (millions)
31	1	"Where There's Smoke..."	Michael Patrick King	Michael Patrick King	June 4, 2000	301	N/A
Carrie meets a politician named Bill Kelley at a FDNY calendar benefit in Staten Island. Miranda gets help from Steve after she undergoes LASIK eye surgery. Tired of waiting for a fairytale romance, Charlotte begins aggressively searching for a "Prince Charming" to marry. Samantha dates the pinup-boy fireman she met at the benefit.
32	2	"Politically Erect"	Michael Patrick King	Darren Star	June 11, 2000	302	3.60
Carrie continues dating her politician beau, but he later reveals to have a golden shower fetish. Miranda does not know how to respond when Steve asks her to "go steady". Charlotte throws a "used date" party to find a new man. Samantha dates a short man who shops at the Boy's Department in Bloomingdale's.
33	3	"Attack of the 5'10" Woman"	Pam Thomas	Cindy Chupack	June 18, 2000	303	3.98
Carrie must confront her past with Big when she runs into Natasha, Big's wife. Miranda hires Magda, a Ukrainian maid with very traditional values. Charlotte deals with some of her body image issues at a spa. Samantha gets banned from Helena Rubinstein when she gets physical with a masseur.
34	4	"Boy, Girl, Boy, Girl..."	Pam Thomas	Jenny Bicks	June 25, 2000	304	3.69
Carrie dates a twenty-something man who is openly bisexual. Miranda deals with personal issues when Steve proposes moving in with her. Charlotte poses as a drag king for an artist at her gallery. Samantha butts heads with her new twenty-something male assistant. Alanis Morissette guest-stars.
35	5	"No Ifs, Ands, or Butts"	Nicole Holofcener	Michael Patrick King	July 9, 2000	305	3.97
Carrie's smoking becomes a problem when she goes on her first date with Aidan Shaw. Miranda makes more time for Steve in her life. Charlotte dates the worst kisser she's ever met. Samantha dates a black man whose sister does not agree with their interracial relationship.
36	6	"Are We Sluts?"	Allison Anders	Cindy Chupack	July 16, 2000	306	N/A
Carrie wants to sleep with Aidan, but he's reluctant to rush into a physical relationship. Miranda discovers she has chlamydia and has to inform her past sexual partners. Charlotte's new boyfriend calls her names during sex. Samantha's neighbors disapprove of her sex life after a late-night visitor lets in a burglar.
37	7	"Drama Queens"	Allison Anders	Darren Star	July 23, 2000	307	4.56
Carrie obsesses about her perfect relationship when Aidan suggests she meet his parents. Miranda enjoys her intimate life with Steve. Charlotte gets upset when a married friend won't set her up with his bachelor buddy. Samantha tries Viagra while sleeping with a doctor.
38	8	"The Big Time"	Allison Anders	Jenny Bicks	July 30, 2000	308	3.93
Carrie runs into Big who confesses that he misses her and cannot stop thinking about her. Miranda gets annoyed with Steve's childish habits when he suggests they have a baby together. Charlotte falls in love with Trey after only a few weeks of dating and is convinced he is "The One". Samantha believes she has hit menopause when her period is a week late.
39	9	"Easy Come, Easy Go"	Charles McDougall	Michael Patrick King	August 6, 2000	309	3.50
Big tells Carrie that he is leaving his wife. Miranda deals with her breakup and Steve moving out of the apartment. After meeting Bunny MacDougal, the family matriarch, Charlotte maneuvers Trey into making an "alrighty" proposal. Samantha is upset about dating a hot guy with "funky spunk".
40	10	"All or Nothing"	Charles McDougall	Jenny Bicks	August 13, 2000	310	4.42
Carrie feels guilty and wants to quit her affair with Big. Miranda enjoys phone sex with a co-worker from Chicago. Charlotte negotiates the terms of her prenuptial agreement with Trey's mother, Bunny. After celebrating her move to the new apartment in the exclusive Meatpacking District, Samantha's bout of the 'flu gives her a pessimistic outlook on life.
41	11	"Running with Scissors"	Dennis Erdman	Michael Patrick King	August 20, 2000	311	4.64
Carrie continues her affair with Big, and separately tells Samantha and Miranda. Charlotte finds out when she accidentally bumps into the couple outside their hotel. Carrie and Big next meet in his apartment while Natasha is in the Hamptons. Arriving home early, she catches Carrie there. She chases Carrie out and falls down the backstairs, cutting her lip and cracking a tooth. Carrie takes her to the emergency room where she tells Big they are over. Charlotte hires stylist Anthony Marentino to help find her perfect wedding dress. Samantha meets the "male version of herself", but he refuses to sleep with her until she takes an HIV test.
42	12	"Don't Ask, Don't Tell"	Dan Algrant	Cindy Chupack	August 27, 2000	312	4.16
Carrie struggles to find the right time to tell Aidan about her affair. Miranda tells a guy she's a stewardess in hopes of getting a date. Charlotte has her dream wedding and marries Trey MacDougal—even after attempted late-night tryst reveals Trey's serious shortcomings. Cunning linguist Samantha sleeps with Trey's Scottish cousin, despite being unable to understand him.
43	13	"Escape from New York"	John David Coles	Becky Hartman Edwards & Michael Patrick King	September 10, 2000	313	4.20
Carrie, Samantha and Miranda travel to Los Angeles. Carrie meets with actor and producer Matthew McConaughey to talk about optioning her columns to make a film. Miranda wrestles with the level of unabashed sexuality in Los Angeles. Charlotte uses the Internet to deal with Trey's impotence problem. Samantha meets a dildo model.
44	14	"Sex and Another City"	John David Coles	Jenny Bicks	September 17, 2000	314	4.76
Carrie meets Keith Travers (Vince Vaughn), a publicity agent for celebrities who shows her the perks of the rich and famous in Los Angeles. Miranda meets an old friend from New York who has lost his East-Coast edge. Charlotte goes to Los Angeles after becoming frustrated with Trey's sexual problems. Samantha meets her idol, Hugh Hefner, and gets the girls invited to a party at the Playboy Mansion.
45	15	"Hot Child in the City"	Michael Spiller	Allan Heinberg	September 24, 2000	315	4.94
Carrie dates a hunky comic-book store owner who still lives with his parents. Miranda gets braces. Charlotte is shocked when she catches the supposedly impotent Trey masturbating. Samantha's latest client is Jenny Brier (Kat Dennings), a 13-year-old Jewish-American princess, planning her million-dollar bat mitzvah.
46	16	"Frenemies"	Michael Spiller	Jenny Bicks	October 1, 2000	316	5.35
Carrie teaches a seminar on how to meet men at The Learning Annex, but it turns out to be as unsuccessful as her own love life. Miranda dates one of Carrie's ex-boyfriends (known as Asshole Jim), whom she meets at the funeral of a dead never-met blind-date. Charlotte gets frustrated with her sex life with Trey. Samantha gets in a fight with Charlotte about her attitude toward sex.
47	17	"What Goes Around Comes Around"	Allen Coulter	Darren Star	October 8, 2000	317	N/A
After getting mugged in broad daylight, Carrie decides to talk with Natasha about her affair with Big, in order to clear herself of bad karma. Miranda dates a handsome NYPD detective and becomes self-conscious about her own looks. Unhappily married Charlotte struggles with her lust for a hunky gardener at Trey's family house; she and Trey decide to separate. Samantha meets another Sam Jones, who turns out to be an NYU student and desperate virgin.
48	18	"Cock a Doodle Do!"	Allen Coulter	Michael Patrick King	October 15, 2000	318	4.71
Carrie meets with Big for the first time since his marriage ended. Miranda gets frustrated when she thinks the Chinese take-out girl mocks her stay-at-home lifestyle. Charlotte moves back into her old apartment and gets an uplifting visit from Trey in the middle of the night. Samantha feuds with the raucous transsexual prostitutes who conduct business outside her apartment in the middle of the night.

== Home media ==
Sex and the City: The Complete Third Season
Set details		Special features
18 episodes; 3-disc set (DVD); 1.33:1 aspect ratio; Subtitles: English, French; English: Dolby Digital 2.0 Surround; Spanish: Dolby Digital 2.0 Mono; French: Dolby Digital 2.0 Surround		Audio Commentary of 4 Episodes with Executive Producer Michael Patrick King; Cast biographies; Episode Previews; Episode Index & Chapter Reviews
DVD release date
Region 1	Region 2	Region 4
May 21, 2002	July 1, 2002	October 2, 2008
