= Sex and the City season 1 =

Season of American television series

Sex and the City
- Season 1
- Promotional poster
- No. of episodes: 12

Release
- Original network: HBO
- Original release: June 6 – August 23, 1998

Season chronology
- Next → Season 2

The first season of Sex and the City, an American television romantic comedy-drama, aired in the United States on HBO from June 6 to August 23, 1998. Based on the eponymous book written by Candace Bushnell, the series was created by Darren Star and produced by Darren Star Productions, HBO Original Programming, and Warner Bros. Television. Star, Barry Josen and Michael Patrick King served as the series' executive producers. The show follows the relationships and sexual escapades of Carrie Bradshaw, a sex columnist for the fictional New York Star, and her friends Samantha Jones, Charlotte York and Miranda Hobbes.

Season one, comprising 12 episodes, aired on Sunday nights at 9:00 p.m. Eastern Time Zone, except for the pilot episode and "Models and Mortals", which aired from 9:45 to 11:00 p.m., and "The Baby Shower", which aired from 10:15 to 11:00 p.m. The season garnered mixed reviews from critics. The first season garnered strong ratings for HBO in America, as well as Channel 4 in the United Kingdom, where it landed among the top 30 weekly most-watched programs. The show received several major award nominations, including an Emmy Award, a Golden Globe, and a SAG award for Best Actress in a Comedy Series for Parker.

== Episodes ==
No. overall	No. in season	Title	Directed by	Written by	Original release date	Prod. code
1	1	"Sex and the City"	Susan Seidelman	Darren Star	June 6, 1998	100
An anecdote about Elizabeth (Sarah Wynter) typifies how problematic it is for successful New York women to find a good man. Next, at a birthday party for thirty-something Miranda, Carrie and her friends vow to stop worrying about finding the "perfect" male and start having sex "like men". Carrie has several encounters with tycoon heartthrob Mr. Big. Miranda starts dating nice-guy Skipper Johnston. Charlotte goes on a date with Capote Duncan (Jeffrey Nordling), but when she tells him she won't have sex with him, he goes to a club and winds up going home with Samantha. The songs that played in this episode are "A Martini For Mancini" by Joey Altruda, and "Mucci's Jag Mark II" by Joey Altruda. Aside from the four main characters, Big (played by Chris Noth) is the only character to appear in both the pilot show and the series finale "An American Girl in Paris, Part Deux". Mr. Big's nickname is created by Carrie. His real name is jokingly covered up throughout the series run and remains unknown until the last scene of the final episode.
2	2	"Models and Mortals"	Alison Maclean	Darren Star	June 6, 1998	101
After Miranda and Skipper bump into each other at the convenience store, they sleep together for the first time. Carrie interviews Barkley, a modelizer who videotapes his conquests. Derek, a male model client of Stanford Blatch, spends the night with Carrie after a fashion show, although they don't sleep together. Samantha chases Barkley while at a fashion show, in order to be taped. The "Derek" character is supposedly based on one-time Calvin Klein underwear model Michael Bergin, with whom Candice Bushnell was once briefly involved. Bergin has stated he auditioned for the job of his alter-ego, but was told he was too old for the part.
3	3	"Bay of Married Pigs"	Nicole Holofcener	Michael Patrick King	June 21, 1998	102
Carrie is invited to go up to their Hamptons beach house by Patience and Peter, but in the morning she bumps into Peter in the hall without his underwear on. Some friends introduce her to Sean, 'The Marrying Guy'; when she can't keep up on his quick-march to commitment, she recommends commitment-phile Charlotte. Miranda's colleague from work, Jeff, introduces her to a lesbian, Sid, at a baseball game, and they are invited to her senior partner's dinner party as a couple.
4	4	"Valley of the Twenty-Something Guys"	Alison Maclean	Michael Patrick King	June 28, 1998	103
Mr. Big and Carrie continue to bump into each other during social events, which leads them to try to organize their first "drink thing". On a night out, Carrie meets twenty-something Sam (Timothy Olyphant) for a fling, which turns out not to be so glamorous in the light of day. Charlotte despairs over the possibility of having anal sex. Samantha dates a younger chef, but finds the appeal wearing off.
5	5	"The Power of Female Sex"	Susan Seidelman	Story by : Jenji Kohan; Teleplay by : Darren Star	July 5, 1998	104
Carrie bumps into international party-girl Amalita and her latest man Carlo in a shoe store, who in turn introduce her to a French architect, Gilles. He leaves Carrie $1,000 on the nightstand after a one-night stand. Charlotte meets Neville Morgan, a renowned artist, who paints pictures of her vulva for his latest exhibition. Samantha tries to get a reservation at a hot new restaurant.
6	6	"Secret Sex"	Michael Fields	Darren Star	July 12, 1998	105
Carrie and Mr. Big have their first official "date", but Carrie suspects Mr. Big is keeping her secret from his social circle. Miranda dates a man from her gym class named Ted, but she discovers a spanking video in his apartment.
7	7	"The Monogamists"	Darren Star	Darren Star	July 19, 1998	106
Carrie and Mr. Big begin dating on a regular basis, but she learns after bumping into him that he is dating other women. Samantha begins to look for an apartment to purchase. Charlotte dates a man who prefers oral sex while Miranda becomes jealous after seeing Skipper with another woman. Notes: First guest star appearance of Justin Theroux.
8	8	"Three's a Crowd"	Nicole Holofcener	Jenny Bicks	July 26, 1998	107
Carrie finds out that Big was married once, and that he had a threesome. Charlotte's boyfriend wants to have a threesome. Miranda feels left out because she's never been "threesome material", so she responds to a classified ad to validate her sexual appeal. Samantha becomes involved with a married man, and his wife offers to have a threesome to keep the marriage together, which Samantha declines.
9	9	"The Turtle and the Hare"	Michael Fields	Nicole Avril & Susan Kolinsky	August 2, 1998	108
Carrie is unhappy when Mr. Big tells her that he never wants to get married again. Stanford Blatch proposes to her in order to please his grandmother and inherit his part of the family fortune. Samantha's latest pet project is "The Turtle", one of New York's most successful yet style-impaired bachelors. Charlotte becomes addicted to a rabbit vibrator called "The Rabbit".
10	10	"The Baby Shower"	Susan Seidelman	Terri Minsky	August 9, 1998	109
The four women attend a baby shower for their one-time wild-child friend Laney in her new buttoned-down Connecticut-suburb environs. Carrie is forced to think about motherhood by her late period. Miranda regards the other guests as part of the cult of The Motherhood. Still-single Charlotte fears her dreams of being a wife and mother are slipping away. Samantha throws a "no-baby shower" in response to the one the four women attended.
11	11	"The Drought"	Matthew Harrison	Michael Green & Michael Patrick King	August 16, 1998	110
Carrie's relationship with Mr. Big has been going on for long enough that it is becoming less physical, especially after she farts in bed. Charlotte is dating a man who isn't interested in sex anymore thanks to the side-effects of Prozac. Samantha discovers that not having sex can be erotic. Miranda realizes that she hasn't had sex for months.
12	12	"Oh Come All Ye Faithful"	Matthew Harrison	Michael Patrick King	August 23, 1998	111
After being introduced as "a friend" to his mother, Carrie realizes her relationship with Mr. Big is one-sided and breaks up with him. Miranda dates an up-and-coming playwright who is also an up-tight Catholic. Samantha falls in love with a perfect man, but he doesn't measure up to her requirements. Charlotte gets psychic readings to see if she'll ever marry.

== Crew ==
The first season of Sex and the City was created by Darren Star and produced by Darren Star Productions and Warner Bros. Television, in association with HBO Original Programming. The series is based on the book of the same name, written by Candace Bushnell, which contains stories from her column with the New York Observer. The show features production from Barry Jossen, Michael Patrick King, and Star. Season one featured writing credits from Star, King, Jenny Bicks, Michael Green, Jenji Kohan, Susan Kolinsky, and Terri Minsky. The season was directed by Michael Fields, Matthew Harrison, Nicole Holofcener, Alison Maclean, and Susan Seidelman.

== Cast ==
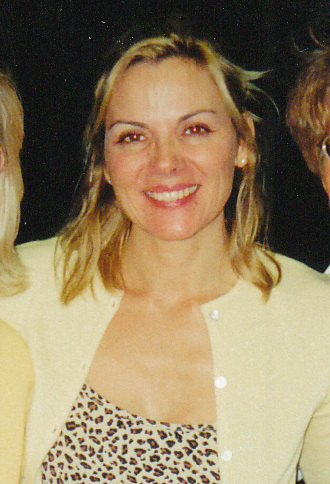
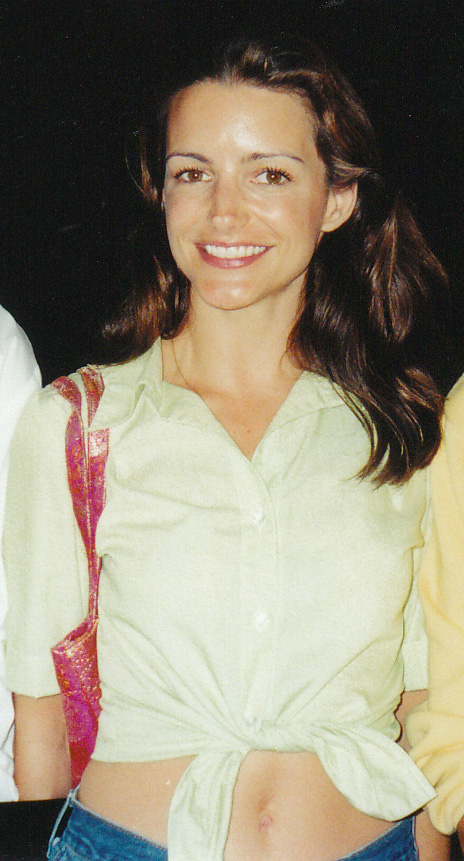
Lead actresses Kim Cattrall and Kristin Davis.

Season one featured four actors receiving star billing. Sarah Jessica Parker played the lead character Carrie Bradshaw, a writer of a sex column, "Sex and the City", for fictional magazine and the narrator of the series. Kim Cattrall portrayed Samantha Jones, a sexually confident public relations agent who follows the same relationship rules that men do. Kristin Davis played Charlotte York, an optimistic art museum curator who holds traditional views on relationships. Cynthia Nixon portrayed Miranda Hobbes, an acerbic lawyer with a pessimistic outlook on relationship and a distrust of men.

The season featured a number of recurring guest appearances. Chris Noth appeared as the slick, elusive business man and Carrie's love interest known as Mr. Big. Willie Garson portrayed Carrie's gay best friend and talent manager Stanford Blatch. Ben Weber played Skipper Johnson, Carrie's friend and Miranda's on-off friend with benefits.

== Reception ==
=== Critical reviews ===
Season one garnered mixed reviews from television critics, receiving an aggregated score of 52 (out of 100) at Metacritic. Caryn Lucas of The New York Times called the series "slight, breezy", "fresh and funny" while highlighting Parker's performance. Terry Kelleher of People Weekly praised Parker in her role, but was against the elements of New York mixed with the theme of sex. Phil Gallo of Variety gave a mixed review of the series, criticizing the script but praising the performances of the main cast. Gallo also deemed the subplot of Carrie and Mr. Big's attraction "compelling." Earl Crassey of DVD Talk deemed the DVD release of season one "Highly Recommended", writing that "However those not easily offended should give it a spin; you will find an enjoyable and refreshing new comedy series from HBO." Crassey noted that the frank sexual dialogue and topics discussed in the series set it apart from the other sitcoms.

=== Viewership ===
In the United States, Sex and the City debuted on June 6, 1998, at 9:00 p.m. Eastern Time Zone (Saturday) with the premiere episode "Sex and the City". The episode garnered a 2.9 household rating, translating to 2.8 million households. The encore episode achieved a 3.0 rating (2.96 million households). The episode was watched by 3.84 million viewers. The season finale "Oh Come All Ye Faithful" was watched by 4.44 million viewers. The first season averaged a total viewership of 6.9 million viewers. In the United Kingdom, the series debuted on Channel 4 on February 3, 1999, to 4.53 million viewers, ranking as the third most watched program on television on the week ending February 7, 1999. The following episodes attracted between 2.5 and 4 million viewers.

==== UK ratings ====
All viewing figures and ranks are sourced from BARB.

No. in		Episode	Air date	Time slot (EST)	Viewership	
series	season	Episode	Air date	Time slot (EST)	in millions	Weekly rank
1	1	Sex and the City	February 3, 1999	Wednesdays; 10:00 pm	4.53	#3
76	2	Models and Mortals	February 10, 1999	Wednesdays; 10:00 pm	3.28	#14
77	3	Bay of Married Pigs	February 17, 1999	Wednesdays; 10:00 pm	3.90	#7
78	4	The Valley of Twenty-Something Guys	February 24, 1999	Wednesdays; 10:00 pm	3.45	#14
79	5	The Power of Female Sex	March 3, 1999	Wednesdays; 10:00 pm	3.18	#13
80	6	Secret Sex	March 10, 1999	Wednesdays; 10:00 pm	2.52	#20
81	7	The Monogamists	March 17, 1999	Wednesdays; 10:00 pm	3.13	#9
82	8	Three's a Crowd	March 24, 1999	Wednesdays; 10:00 pm	2.54	#24
83	9	The Turtle and the Hare	March 31, 1999	Wednesdays; 10:00 pm	2.56	#19
84	10	The Baby Shower	April 7, 1999	Wednesdays; 10:00 pm	2.71	#17
85	11	The Drought	April 14, 1999	Wednesdays; 10:00 pm	—N/a	—N/a
12	12	Oh Come All Ye Faithful	April 21, 1999	Wednesdays; 10:00 pm	—N/a	—N/a

=== Awards and nominations ===
At the 56th Golden Globe Awards, Sarah Jessica Parker received a nomination for award for Best Actress – Television Series Musical or Comedy. At the 50th Primetime Emmy Awards, the series was nominated for Outstanding Comedy Series while Parker received a nomination for Outstanding Lead Actress in a Comedy Series. Sex and the City received seven nominations from the Online Film & Television Association for the OFTA Television Awards, including awards for Best New Comedy Series, Best Cable Series and Best Ensemble in a Cable Series.

== Home media release ==
The DVD boxset for the first season was released by HBO Home Video in the United States on May 23, 2000, nearly two years since it completed its broadcast on television. The season boxset, in addition to the twelve episodes, includes features such as commentary from the cast and show creator, episode previews, and an inside look at the show. The boxset was popular in the United States, selling 1.1 million copies by 2003.

Sex and the City: The Complete First Season
Set details		Special features
12 episodes; 2-disc set (DVD); 1.33:1 aspect ratio; Subtitles: English, French, English: Dolby Surround 5.1, Dolby Surround Stereo; Spanish: Mono		Episode Previews (approx 0:30 each); Inside "Sex and the City" (3:49); "Research" (0:31); Cast & Filmmakers (5 cast members and show creator); Awards & Nominations
DVD release date
Region 1	Region 2	Region 4
May 23, 2000	July 11, 2005	October 2, 2008
