= Sex and the City season 6 =

Season of American television series

Sex and the City
- Season 6
- Promotional poster
- Starring: Sarah Jessica Parker; Kim Cattrall; Kristin Davis; Cynthia Nixon
- No. of episodes: 20

Release
- Original network: HBO
- Original release: June 22, 2003 – February 22, 2004

Season chronology
- ← Previous; Season 5

The sixth and final season of the American television romantic comedy-drama Sex and the City aired in the United States on HBO. The show was created by Darren Star while Star, Michael Patrick King, John P. Melfi, series lead actress Sarah Jessica Parker, Cindy Chupack, and Jenny Bicks served as executive producers. The series was produced by Darren Star Productions, HBO Original Programming, and Warner Bros. Television. Sarah Jessica Parker portrays the lead character Carrie Bradshaw, while Kim Cattrall, Kristin Davis and Cynthia Nixon played her best friends Samantha Jones, Charlotte York, and Miranda Hobbes.

The final season marks dramatic changes in the ladies' lives. While Carrie's book career is on the rise, she dates Jack Berger, a struggling writer, and Alexandr Petrovsky, a renowned Russian artist. Samantha starts a long-term relationship with a struggling actor, who becomes her client, while battling breast cancer. Miranda dates a doctor living in her building before reuniting with Steve, who she later marries. Charlotte converts to Judaism, marries Harry Goldenblatt, and tries to get pregnant through fertility treatments.

While critical reception for season six was mixed to negative, Sex and the City won and was nominated for many awards during the season. All four actresses received Emmy and Golden Globe nominations, with Parker and Nixon both winning Emmy awards. The series also reached viewership highs, with the finale reaching ten million viewers in the United States and nearly five million viewers in the United Kingdom.

== Production ==
The sixth season of Sex and the City was produced by Darren Star Productions and in association with HBO Original Programming. The series is based on the book of the same name, written by Candice Bushnell, which contains stories from her column with the New York Observer. The show featured production from Antonia Ellis, Jane Raab and series star Sarah Jessica Parker, also an executive producer alongside Michael Patrick King, John Melfi, Cindy Chupack, and Jenny Bicks. Episodic writers return for the fourth season included Bicks, Chupack, Allan Heinberg, King, Julie Rottenberg, and Elisa Zuritsky. New writers enlisted for the season included Nicole Avril, Jessica Bendinger, and Amy B. Harris. The season was directed by returning directors Allen Coulter, King, Charles McDougall, Michael Spiller, and Alan Taylor. Directors new to the series included Martha Coolidge, Michael Engler, and David Frankel. Confirmed as the last season of the series, Sex and the City's sixth season aired twelve episodes during the summer of 2003 and eight episodes from January to February 2004. The season was filmed from May 2003 to January 2004.

== Cast and characters ==
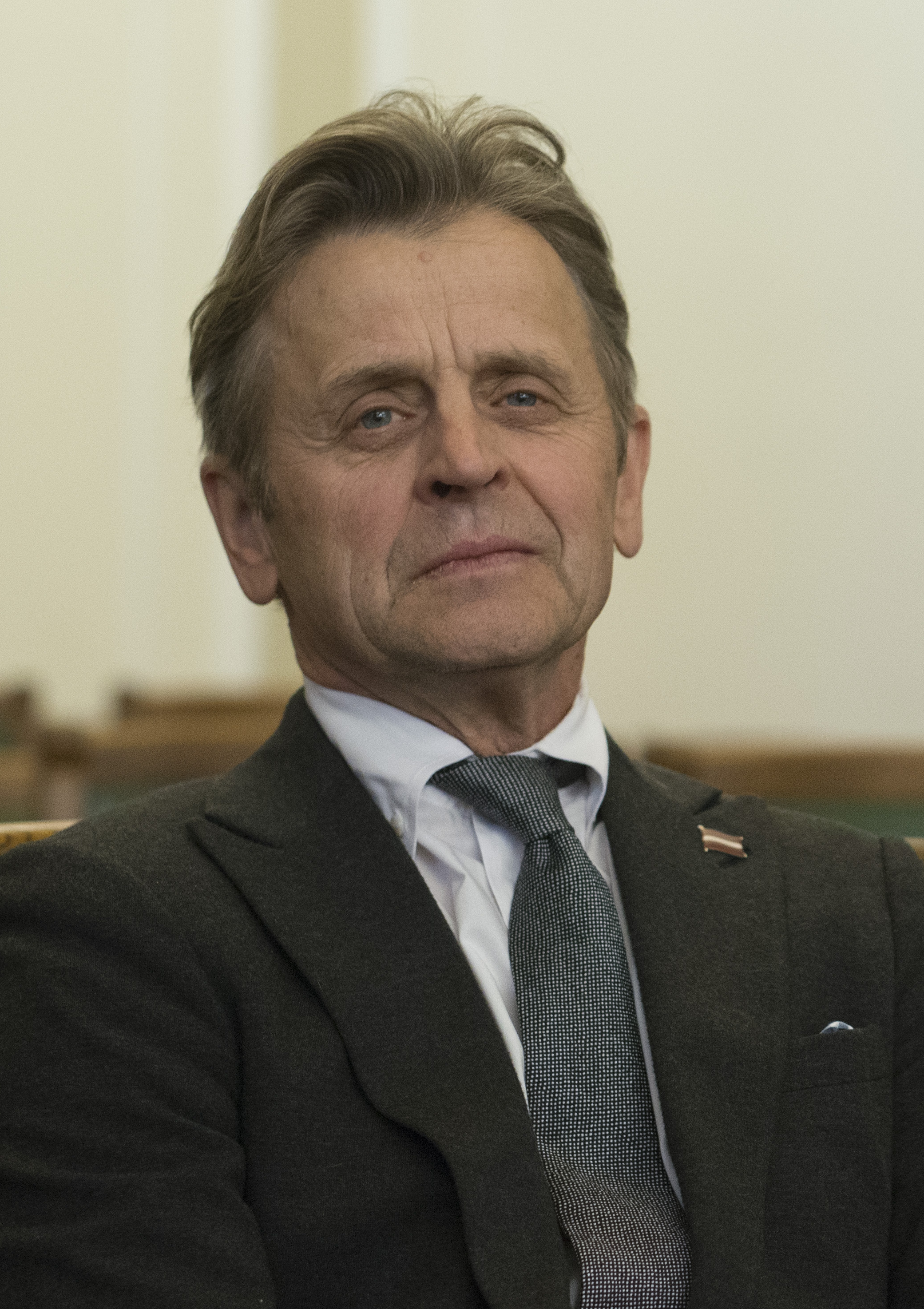
Mikhail Baryshnikov portrayed Alexandr Petrovsky, a Russian artist and Carrie's last love interest in the series.

Like the previous seasons, season six features the same principal cast and characters. Sarah Jessica Parker portrays Carrie Bradshaw, a fashionable middle aged woman who writes about sex and life in New York City in her column, "Sex and the City", with the fictional New York Star. Kim Cattrall played the promiscuous public relations agent Samantha Jones. Kristin Davis portrayed Charlotte York Goldenblatt, an optimistic, straight laced former art curator who remains the most traditional amongst her friends in terms of relationships and public decorum. Cynthia Nixon acted as the acerbic and sarcastic lawyer Miranda Hobbes, who holds a pessimistic view on relationships and men.

The sixth season featured a number of recurring and guest actors whose characters contributed significantly to the series plotlines. Chris Noth reprised his role as Mr. Big, a sly businessman who at this point remains friends with Carrie despite their previous romantic relationships. David Eigenberg portrayed Miranda's on-off boyfriend, bar owner and father of her child Steve Brady. Willie Garson appeared as entertainment manager and Carrie's gay friend Stanford Blatch. Evan Handler plays Charlotte's Jewish boyfriend and subsequent husband Harry Goldenblatt. Lynn Cohen reprises her role as Magda, Miranda's foreign housekeeper. Mario Cantone recurs in the season as Charlotte's gay friend and former wedding planner Anthony Marantino. Jason Lewis joins the series, portraying Smith Jerrod, a burgeoning actor and Samantha's client and boyfriend. Blair Underwood acts as Dr. Robert Leeds, Miranda's neighbor and subsequent boyfriend. Ron Livingston reprises his role as Jack Berger, a writer and Carrie's love interest. Sean Palmer appears as Stanford's boyfriend and client Marcus. Mikhail Baryshnikov appeared in the last episodes as Alexandr Petrovsky, a famed Russian artist with whom Carrie becomes romantically involved.

Serbian performance artist Marina Abramović was asked to play herself and perform her piece The House with the Ocean View in an episode, which she refused. She was eventually portrayed by Beth Lapides.

== Reception ==
=== Viewership and ratings ===
Season six of Sex and the City debuted on June 22, 2003 with the episode "To Market, to Market". Garnering a 4.9 Nielsen rating, the episode was seen in over 5.18 million households. "To Market, to Market" attracted 7.30 million viewers, and marked a slight decrease from the fifth-season premiere. Airing on a split summer-winter schedule, the first twelve episodes were broadcast in the summer. The majority of the episodes maintained a viewership above six million viewers, with only two episodes falling below the threshold. The summer season finale, "One", was viewed by 7.65 million people and registered a 5.0 Nielsen rating, eclipsing the 4.9 rating of the season premiere and becoming the highest rated episode of the series. The finale eight episodes were broadcast between January 4 and February 22, 2004. The winter premiere "Let There Be Light" attracted 6.36 million viewers, registering the lowest rated premiere since the season four premiere episode "The Agony and the 'Ex'-tacy". The series finale "An American Girl In Paris" (Part Deux) was viewed by 10.62 million viewers, achieving the highest viewership of the series, as well as achieving the highest household rating with a 6.5. In the United Kingdom, season six episodes consistently ranked among the top ten viewed programs on Channel 4. The series finale achieved a viewership of 4.71 million, the highest the series has received and ranked number two for the week it aired.

=== Critical reviews ===
Phil Gallo of Variety wrote a negative review for season six. Gallo noted that the characters have turned "one-dimensional and single-minded" and that the overall quality has declined, deeming the series a "dull rehash of a casual sex maniac searching for prey, an annoying frustrated single mother and a perky divorcee trying to understand Judaism."

Tom Shales of Eugene Register-Guard gave the episode "Let There Be Light" a mixed review, calling it a "slapdashy, mishmoshy affair in which some of the humor feels forced, as well as being inconsistent with the witty-wacky tone of the show." Shales was more positive with the next episode "The Ick Factor", which he stated was "full of snap and fizz and one certifiable shock."

== Awards and nominations ==
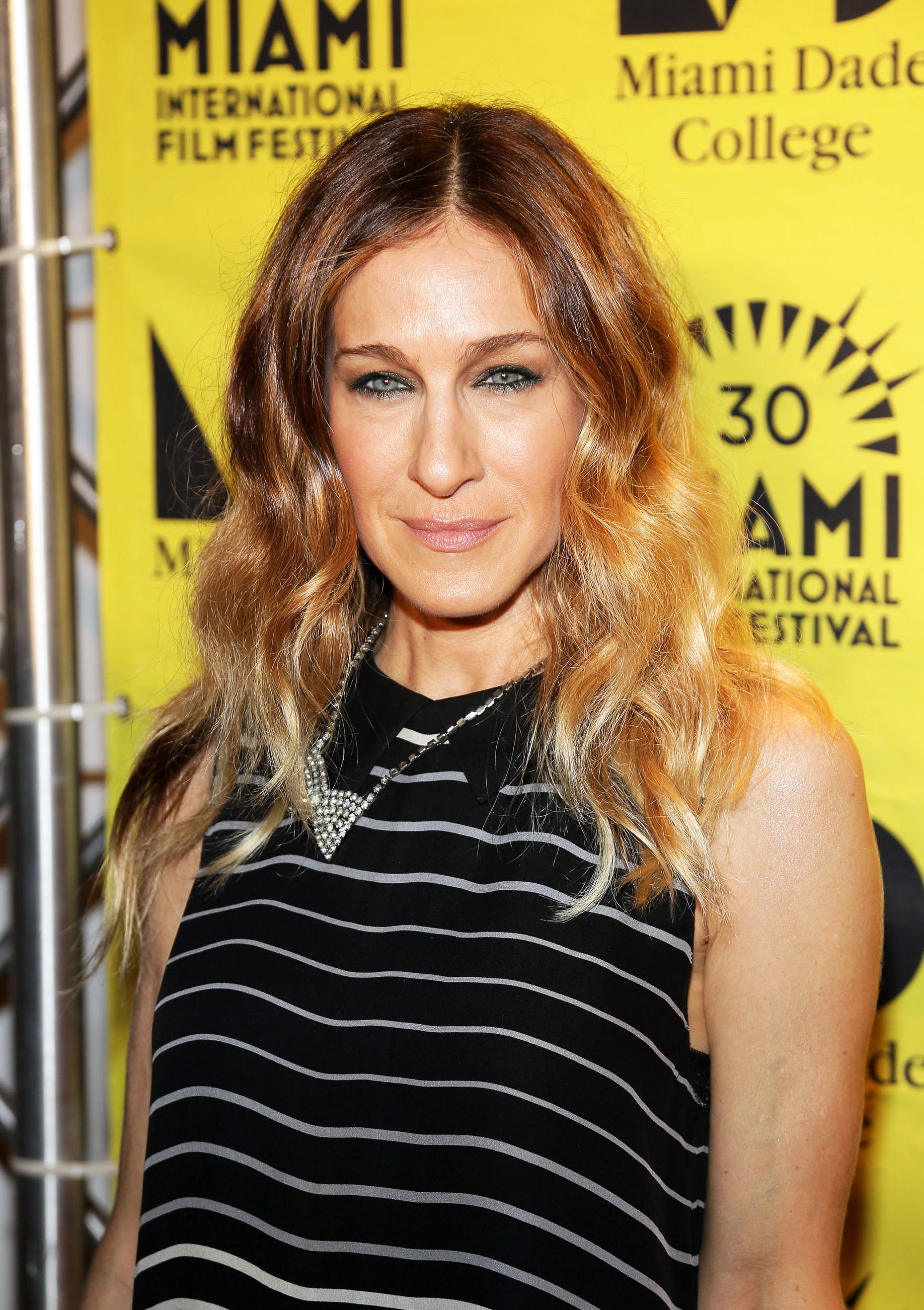
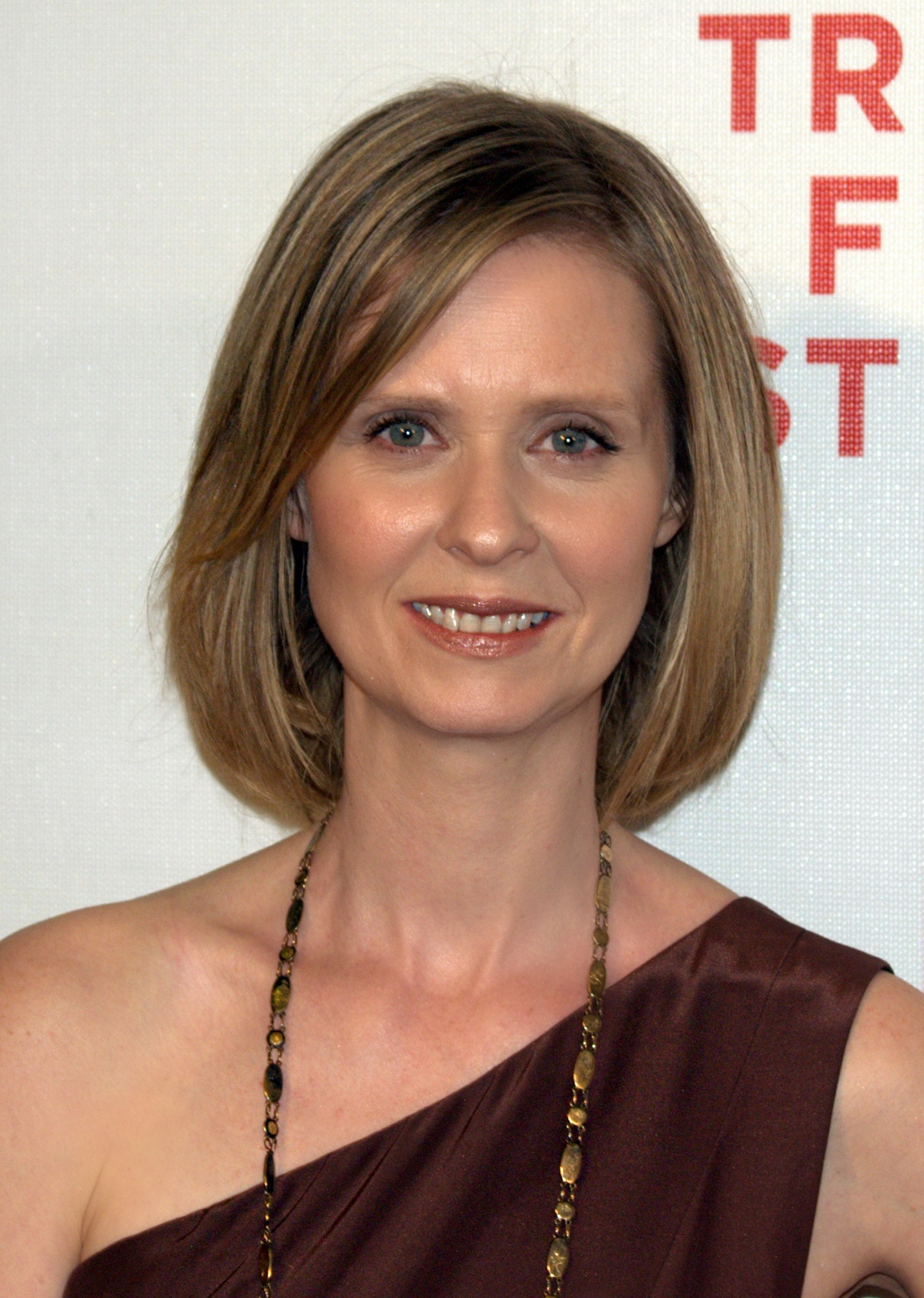
Sarah Jessica Parker and Cynthia Nixon won Primetime Emmy Awards for their performances in the final season.

As a result of the split season, Sex and the City received Golden Globe award nominations for Best Television Series – Musical or Comedy and Best Actress – Television Series Musical or Comedy for Sarah Jessica Parker in 2004 and 2005. At the 61st Golden Globe Awards, Parker won the award for Best Actress – Television Series Musical or Comedy while Kim Cattrall, Kristin Davis and Cynthia Nixon were all nominated for Best Supporting Actress – Series, Miniseries or Television Film. The series also received nominations for Outstanding Performance by an Ensemble in a Comedy Series in 2004 and 2005 for the season, winning at the 10th Screen Actors Guild Awards. Parker received another nomination for Outstanding Performance by a Female Actor in a Comedy Series at the 11th Screen Actors Guild Awards. At the 3rd PGA Golden Laurel Awards, Michael Patrick King, Cindy Chupack, John P. Melfi, Parker, Jenny Bicks and Jane Raab won the award for Television Producer of the Year Award in Episodic - Comedy for their production work on the series.

At the 56th Primetime Emmy Awards, Sex and the City received 11 nominations (8 of them for major awards) with Parker winning Outstanding Lead Actress in a Comedy Series, and Nixon winning Outstanding Supporting Actress in a Comedy Series. The series was also nominated for the award for Outstanding Comedy Series for the sixth time, but lost to the freshman Fox series Arrested Development. Sex and the City was also nominated for Outstanding Casting for a Comedy Series and Outstanding Costumes for a Series, both for the fifth time. Cattrall and Davis were both nominated for an Outstanding Supporting Actress in a Comedy Series Emmy for their respective portrays of Samantha Jones and Charlotte York Goldenblatt, being Cattrall's fifth nomination and Davis's first. The series finale "An American Girl in Paris (Part Deux)" received nominations for four awards, including Outstanding Writing for a Comedy Series and Outstanding Directing for a Comedy Series.

Costume designer Patricia Field won the Costume Designers Guild Award for Best Costume Design – Contemporary TV Series at the 7th Annual Costume Designers Guild Awards. At the 2003 Directors Guild of America Awards, three episodes from season four - "Great Sexpectations" (directed by Michael Patrick King), "Hop, Skip & a Week" (directed by Michael Engler), and "Boy Interrupted" (directed by Tim Van Patten) - were nominated for the award for Outstanding Directing – Comedy Series. Van Patten won the award in 2003 for "Boy Interrupted" and in 2004 for the episode "An American Girl in Paris: Part Deux".

== Episodes ==
No. overall	No. in season	Title	Directed by	Written by	Original release date	Prod. code	U.S. viewers (millions)
Part 1
75	1	"To Market, to Market"	Michael Patrick King	Michael Patrick King	June 22, 2003	601	7.30
While nervously anticipating her first date with Berger, Carrie runs into Aidan for the first time since their breakup, and is surprised by how far he's moved on. Miranda realizes she's in love with Steve—only to hear he has a new girlfriend. Charlotte struggles with Harry's assertion that he can only marry a Jew. Samantha sleeps with a stockbroker who gives insider tips while inside her.
76	2	"Great Sexpectations"	Michael Patrick King	Cindy Chupack	June 29, 2003	602	5.82
Carrie and Berger's dates sizzle in the restaurants, but fizzle in the bedroom. Miranda becomes addicted to a British television show featuring an interracial romance. A tenacious Charlotte pursues converting to Judaism for Harry. Samantha and the girls go to a cold-food restaurant where Samantha meets hot waiter Jerry Jerrod (Smith).
77	3	"The Perfect Present"	David Frankel	Jenny Bicks	July 6, 2003	603	6.95
After Berger flips out and flips off his ex-girlfriend's answer-phone message, Carrie tries to not think about her influence on his life. Miranda finds condoms in Brady's diaper bag and gets upset with Steve. Newly converted Charlotte mourns the loss of Christmas. An on-the-job quickie with Samantha gets Smith fired from a catering gig.
78	4	"Pick-a-Little, Talk-a-Little"	David Frankel	Julie Rottenberg & Elisa Zuritsky	July 13, 2003	604	6.60
Carrie feels bad for criticizing a minor point in Berger's book. When Berger teaches Miranda how to tell that a man is "not that into her", she feels the need to spread the word to other women. Charlotte cooks her first Shabbat dinner for Harry. Samantha and Jerry act out all their sexual fantasies. This episode's title is a play on the song from The Music Man. This episode was the inspiration for the self-help book He's Just Not That Into You.
79	5	"Lights, Camera, Relationship!"	Michael Engler	Michael Patrick King	July 20, 2003	605	6.43
Carrie receives a big royalty check for her book sales, which upsets Berger, whose book deal has been dropped. A lovesick Miranda helps Steve bake cupcakes—for his new girlfriend. Charlotte is reluctant to date after Harry leaves her. Samantha takes charge of the PR for Jerry's struggling play where he gives a striking—and nude—performance.
80	6	"Hop, Skip, and a Week"	Michael Engler	Amy B. Harris	July 27, 2003	606	6.34
Berger tells Carrie that he needs a break from their relationship. Workaholic Miranda has to cut her hours at work in order to spend more time with Brady. Women from the synagogue compete to set Charlotte up with their single sons, but she runs into Harry at a singles night, and they realize they are meant to be together. PR Manager Samantha changes Jerry's name to Smith and gets him great exposure on a revealing billboard in Times Square.
81	7	"The Post-It Always Sticks Twice"	Alan Taylor	Liz Tuccillo	August 3, 2003	607	5.77
Berger returns, but then breaks up with Carrie with a Post-it Note. Miranda finally loses all her baby-weight and rediscovers her "skinny jeans". Charlotte decides she wants a small wedding. Samantha is reluctant to be labeled as Smith's "girlfriend".
82	8	"The Catch"	Alan Taylor	Cindy Chupack	August 10, 2003	608	6.64
Carrie finds that a casual fling with Harry's best man is a pain in the neck. Miranda is scared of meeting Steve's new girlfriend. After Harry accidentally sees Charlotte in her wedding dress before the big day, she is convinced their wedding is cursed. Self-sufficient Samantha struggles without a man around.
83	9	"A Woman's Right to Shoes"	Tim Van Patten	Jenny Bicks	August 17, 2003	609	6.74
Carrie's shoes are stolen at a party; the hostess (Tatum O'Neal) not only refuses to apologize, but shames her for her extravagant footwear—and lifestyle choices. Miranda contracts chicken pox, and she flirts with the handsome doctor (Blair Underwood) who just moved into her building. Charlotte must adjust to living with Harry (and his tea bags) in her pristine apartment. Children misbehaving in nice restaurants annoy Samantha.
84	10	"Boy, Interrupted"	Tim Van Patten	Cindy Chupack	August 24, 2003	610	6.94
Carrie's high-school sweetheart visits her in New York—on his way to a mental asylum in Connecticut. Miranda develops a crush on her attractive neighbor Robert, the team doctor for the Knicks. In order to get into an exclusive pool at the SoHo House, Samantha pretends to be a member—and British. Geri Halliwell and David Duchovny guest-star.
85	11	"The Domino Effect"	David Frankel	Julie Rottenberg & Elisa Zuritsky	September 7, 2003	611	6.69
Carrie shows strange signs of distress when Big needs heart surgery. Miranda gets close to her new boyfriend Robert, but is reluctant to introduce him to Steve. Reproductively challenged Charlotte tries acupuncture in order to get pregnant. Samantha refuses to hold hands with Smith.
86	12	"One"	David Frankel	Michael Patrick King	September 14, 2003	612	7.65
Carrie meets fifty-something Russian artist Aleksandr Petrovsky (Mikhail Baryshnikov) at a gallery. Miranda's boyfriend Robert says "I love you" but she struggles to say it back. Charlotte is delighted to discover she is pregnant—then devastated when she miscarries. After finding one gray hair down under, Samantha dyes her pubic hair with shocking results.
Part 2
87	13	"Let There Be Light"	Michael Patrick King	Michael Patrick King	January 4, 2004	613	6.36
Carrie begins to feel attached to Aleksandr but cannot ignore his womanizing past. Together again, Steve moves into Miranda's apartment and finds it hard to avoid her angry ex-boyfriend Robert. Charlotte tries to forget her miscarriage by volunteering. Samantha accompanies Smith to an industry party hosted by Richard Wright.
88	14	"The Ick Factor"	Wendey Stanzler	Julie Rottenberg & Elisa Zuritsky	January 11, 2004	614	N/A
Carrie finds Aleksandr's classy, old-world romantic gestures and attention a little overwhelming, and it turns her stomach. Miranda prepares for her non-traditional wedding to Steve. Charlotte and Harry's romantic French dinner leads to a night of the runs. Samantha considers a breast augmentation and receives some unexpected news.
89	15	"Catch-38"	Michael Engler	Cindy Chupack	January 18, 2004	615	N/A
Carrie discovers that Aleksandr has decided to not have any more children. Miranda and Steve go on their four-day honeymoon to a remote inn in upstate New York. Baby Brady sees Charlotte and Harry having sex. Samantha uses Smith's fame to get her an appointment with a well-known female oncologist.
90	16	"Out of the Frying Pan"	Michael Engler	Jenny Bicks	January 25, 2004	616	5.54
Carrie gets upset at Aleksandr for being inconsiderate of her feelings about Samantha's cancer. When her new family outgrows her apartment, Miranda considers buying a house in Brooklyn. Charlotte receives a dog and names her Elizabeth Taylor. Samantha's hair falls out as a result of chemotherapy.
91	17	"The Cold War"	Julian Farino	Aury Wallington	February 1, 2004	617	4.43
Aleksandr refuses to talk about his work or introduce Carrie to his friends. Miranda adjusts to life in Brooklyn. Charlotte decides to enter Elizabeth Taylor in a dog show. Samantha makes a sex tape with Smith after a tabloid reports that she is his "fag hag".
92	18	"Splat!"	Julian Farino	Jenny Bicks & Cindy Chupack	February 8, 2004	618	4.83
Petrovsky hosts a dinner party for Carrie's inner circle, and makes a shocking announcement. Later, the death of an old party friend (Kristen Johnston) helps Carrie reach a big decision.
93	19	"An American Girl in Paris"	Tim Van Patten	Michael Patrick King	February 15, 2004	619	6.14
94	20	"An American Girl in Paris"	Tim Van Patten	Michael Patrick King	February 22, 2004	620	10.62
Part Une: Before joining the Russian in Paris, Carrie has one last dinner in New York with Samantha, Charlotte and Miranda. However, life in the City of Light does not live up to her expectations. After being told off by Carrie before the dinner, Big goes to girls for advice; they convince him to go to Paris and find their girl. Part Deux: Carrie is desperately lonely in Paris as Petrovsky is spending so much time on his new exhibit. The chemo treatments are diminishing Samantha's sex drive. Miranda must take care of Steve's mother after she has a stroke. Charlotte and Harry try to adopt a baby. Big finds Carrie in Paris and says the words she has been waiting six years to hear. Big brings Carrie home to New York and the four women are reunited.

== Ratings ==
=== United States ===
No. in		Episode	Air date	Time slot (EST)	Household		Viewership		Ref
series	season	Episode	Air date	Time slot (EST)	Rating	Viewers (in millions)	in millions	Weekly rank	Ref
75	1	To Market, to Market	June 22, 2003	Sundays; 9:00 pm	4.9	5.18	7.30	#1	
76	2	Great Sexpectations	June 29, 2003	Sundays; 9:00 pm	3.9	4.16	5.82	#1	
77	3	The Perfect Present	July 6, 2003	Sundays; 9:00 pm	4.6	4.96	6.95	#1	
78	4	Pick-A-Little, Talk-A-Little	July 13, 2003	Sundays; 9:00 pm	4.3	4.59	6.60	#1	
79	5	Lights, Camera, Relationship!	July 20, 2003	Sundays; 9:00 pm	4.1	4.41	6.43	#1	
80	6	Hop, Skip and a Week	July 27, 2003	Sundays; 9:00 pm	4.2	4.51	6.34	#1	
81	7	The Post-It Always Sticks Twice	August 3, 2003	Sundays; 9:00 pm	4.1	4.36	5.77	#1	
82	8	The Catch	August 10, 2003	Sundays; 9:00 pm	4.5	4.76	6.64	#1	
83	9	A Woman's Right to Shoes	August 17, 2003	Sundays; 9:00 pm	4.3	4.62	6.74	#1	
84	10	Boy, Interrupted	August 24, 2003	Sundays; 9:00 pm	4.6	4.91	6.94	#1	
85	11	The Domino Effect	September 7, 2003	Sundays; 9:00 pm	4.6	5.00	6.69	#1	
86	12	One	September 14, 2003	Sundays; 9:00 pm	5.0	5.41	7.65	#1	

=== United Kingdom ===
All viewing figures and ranks are sourced from BARB.

No. in		Episode	Air date	Time slot (EST)	Viewership	
series	season	Episode	Air date	Time slot (EST)	in millions	Weekly rank
75	1	To Market, to Market	August 1, 2003	Fridays; 10:00 pm	3.19	#5
76	2	Great Sexpectations	August 8, 2003	Fridays; 10:00 pm	2.83	#2
77	3	The Perfect Present	August 15, 2003	Fridays; 10:00 pm	2.58	#3
78	4	Pick-A-Little, Talk-A-Little	August 22, 2003	Fridays; 10:00 pm	2.36	#4
79	5	Lights, Camera, Relationship!	August 29, 2003	Fridays; 10:00 pm	2.58	#7
80	6	Hop, Skip, and a Week	September 5, 2003	Fridays; 10:00 pm	2.41	#5
81	7	The Post-It Always Sticks Twice	September 12, 2003	Fridays; 10:00 pm	2.57	#7
82	8	The Catch	September 19, 2003	Fridays; 10:00 pm	2.58	#8
83	9	A Woman's Right to Shoes	September 26, 2003	Fridays; 10:00 pm	2.54	#6
84	10	Boy, Interrupted	October 3, 2003	Fridays; 10:00 pm	2.63	#11
85	11	The Domino Effect	October 10, 2003	Fridays; 10:00 pm	2.78	#9
86	12	One	October 10, 2003	Fridays; 10:30 pm	2.89	#8
87	13	Let There Be Light	January 30, 2004	Fridays; 10:00 pm	2.42	#15
88	14	The Ick Factor	February 6, 2004	Fridays; 10:00 pm	2.46	#12
89	15	Catch-38	February 13, 2004	Fridays; 10:00 pm	2.76	#10
90	16	Out of the Frying Pan	February 20, 2004	Fridays; 10:00 pm	2.94	#9
91	17	The Cold War	February 27, 2004	Fridays; 10:00 pm	2.92	#7
92	18	"Splat!"	March 5, 2004	Fridays; 10:00 pm	2.80	#8
93	19	An American Girl in Paris (Part Une)	March 12, 2004	Fridays; 10:00 pm	3.27	#7
94	20	An American Girl in Paris (Part Deux)	March 19, 2004	Fridays; 10:30 pm	4.71	#2

== Home release ==
Sex and the City: The Complete Sixth Season - Part 1
Set details		Special features
12 episodes; 3-disc set (DVD); 1.33:1 aspect ratio; Subtitles: English, French, Spanish; English: Dolby Surround Stereo; Spanish: Dolby Surround Stereo		Audio Commentary With Executive Producer Michael Patrick King; Museum Of TV And Radio Seminar Featuring Sarah Jessica Parker, Kim Cattrall, Kristin Davis, Cynthia Nixon and Michael Patrick King
DVD release date
Region 1	Region 2	Region 4
May 18, 2004	May 12, 2008	October 2, 2008

Sex and the City: The Complete Sixth Season - Part 2
Set details		Special features
8 episodes; 3-disc set (DVD); 1.33:1 aspect ratio; Subtitles: English, French, Spanish; English: Dolby Surround Stereo; Spanish: Dolby Surround Stereo		3 Never-Before-Seen Alternate Endings of the Final Episode; Two 30-minute Farewell Tributes; 10 Deleted Scenes; 4 Audio Commentaries with Michael Patrick King; Aspen Comedy Arts Festival Seminar recorded in March 2004 featuring Sarah Jessica Parker, Michael Patrick King, and other writers from the show (1:15:00)
DVD release date
Region 1	Region 2	Region 4
December 28, 2004	May 12, 2008	October 2, 2008

Sex and the City: The Complete Season 6
Set details	Special features
20 episodes; 5-disc set (DVD); 1.33:1 aspect ratio; Subtitles: English, Spanish, Portuguese; English: Dolby Surround Stereo; French: Dolby Surround Stereo	Audio Commentary With Executive Producer Michael Patrick King; Museum Of TV And Radio Seminar Featuring Sarah Jessica Parker, Kim Cattrall, Kristin Davis, Cynthia Nixon and Michael Patrick King
DVD release date
Region 2
October 25, 2004
