= Carrie Bradshaw =

Fictional character from American TV series Sex and the City

- Sex and the City character The Carrie Diaries character
- Sarah Jessica Parker as Carrie Bradshaw
- First appearance: Print: "Love at the Bowery Bar, Part II" (1995) (The New York Observer); Television: "Sex and the City" (1998) (Sex and the City)
- Last appearance: "Party of One" (2025) (And Just Like That...)
- Created by: Candace Bushnell
- Adapted by: Darren Star
- Portrayed by: Sarah Jessica Parker (Sex and the City, films, And Just Like That...); AnnaSophia Robb (The Carrie Diaries)
- Television duration: 1998–2004; 2008; 2010; 2013–14; 2021–2025

In-universe information
- Full name: Caroline Marie Bradshaw Preston
- Nicknames: Carrie; Kid
- Occupation: Author; Newspaper columnist for The New York Star; Writer at Vogue magazine Podcast co-host
- Family: Tom Bradshaw (father, The Carrie Diaries only); Grace Bradshaw (mother, The Carrie Diaries only; deceased); Dorrit Bradshaw (sister, The Carrie Diaries only); Brady Hobbes (godson); Harriet Preston (mother-in-law, deceased); Melvin Preston (father-in-law, deceased); Richard Preston (brother-in-law); Cassandra (former sister-in-law, Richard's ex-wife); William Preston (brother-in-law, deceased); William's wife (sister-in-law, deceased)
- Spouse: John James "Mr. Big" Preston (m. 2008; died 2021)
- Nationality: American

Caroline Marie "Carrie" Bradshaw Preston is a fictional character and the protagonist of the HBO media franchise Sex and the City, portrayed by Sarah Jessica Parker. In the television series and subsequent films, Carrie is a New York City-based newspaper columnist and fashion enthusiast (particularly shoes). Her weekly column, titled Sex and the City, serves as the narrative framework for each episode, offering commentary on modern relationships, dating, and friendship.

Parker reprised the role in the films Sex and the City (2008) and Sex and the City 2 (2010), as well as in the HBO Max revival series And Just Like That.... The character was originally created by author Candace Bushnell and first appeared in her 1997 anthology Sex and the City, which was based on her newspaper column of the same name.

Bushnell later expanded on the character’s backstory through the young adult novels The Carrie Diaries and Summer and the City. These works were adapted into a CW prequel television series, The Carrie Diaries (2013–2014), in which a teenage version of Carrie was portrayed by Anna Sophia Robb.

== Creation and newspaper column ==
Carrie Bradshaw was created by author Candace Bushnell as a semi-autobiographical character for her column Sex and the City, published in The New York Observer. Initially introduced without a last name, Carrie was portrayed as Bushnell’s friend—“a journalist in her mid-30s”—allowing the author to write candidly about her personal experiences while maintaining anonymity, particularly from her parents. The character embodied a lifestyle defined by the juxtaposition of modest earnings and access to New York’s elite social scene. Bushnell’s columns were later compiled into the 1997 book Sex and the City, which served as the basis for the television series. Bushnell collaborated with producer Darren Star to adapt the material for HBO.

== Character overview ==
=== Career and writing ===
In the Sex and the City franchise, Carrie Bradshaw writes a weekly column titled Sex and the City for a fictional newspaper called The New York Star. The column focuses on her personal experiences with dating and relationships, as well as those of her close friends. It also includes her reflections on gender dynamics in New York City. The column gains her a degree of recognition, and some readers view her as a public figure. In Season 3, her column is optioned for a film project, and by Season 5, a selection of her columns is published as a book. At the end of Season 4, she begins contributing freelance articles to Vogue.

=== Personality and character traits ===
Carrie is often portrayed as emotionally driven, seeking affirmation from romantic partners and others in her life. For example, she becomes preoccupied with a negative review of her book by The New York Times critic Michiko Kakutani. In Season 1, her primary conflict involves persuading Mr. Big, her romantic interest, to commit to a serious relationship. The character has drawn criticism for instances of self-centered behavior, which she rarely addresses unless confronted by her friends—Miranda, Samantha, and Charlotte. Despite this, she is depicted as dealing with themes such as relationship commitment, infidelity, personal change for a partner, and emotional vulnerability.

Carrie is frequently shown smoking, often Marlboro Lights, and attempts to quit during Seasons 3 and 4 to please her then-boyfriend, Aidan. Her interest in fashion—particularly footwear—is a recurring element in the series. Her frequent spending on designer shoes, notably Manolo Blahniks, is depicted as causing financial strain.

She is also associated with drinking cosmopolitans, a cocktail that gained popularity during the show's run.

Although she often expresses doubt about marriage and parenthood, Carrie remains idealistic about love and is determined to pursue romantic relationships that reflect her personal expectations.

=== Background and early life ===
Carrie’s life prior to the events of Sex and the City is only briefly referenced. She was born on October 10, 1966. In season 4's "A Vogue Idea", she mentions she has not seen her father since he left her and her mother when she was five years old. In season 3's "Hot Child in the City", she mentions "driving my parents' Oldsmobile without them knowing about it," implying she grew up in a two-parent household. In season 6's "Boy, Interrupted", her high school boyfriend Jeremy mentions he is staying in Connecticut, with the implication they grew up there. In Sex and the City 2, she states that she moved to Manhattan on June 11, 1986, at age 21. In the first film, she states that she has lived in Manhattan for 20 years, though in the series she says at age 35 that she has lived there for a decade. In season 4, she tells a photographer that during her early years in the city she was so financially constrained that she would choose to buy Vogue instead of dinner.

In The Carrie Diaries, which contradicts various details in Sex and the City, Carrie is from the fictional town of Castlebury, Connecticut, and was raised by her father after the death of her mother with a sister who was never previously mentioned.

==== The Carrie Diaries ====
AnnaSophia Robb as teenaged Carrie Bradshaw in the Carrie Diaries TV series

The Carrie Diaries is a television prequel series set prior to the events of Sex and the City, depicting Carrie’s teenage years. It follows her life in a Connecticut suburb, where she lives with her father and younger sister, Dorrit. The Carrie Diaries introduced several inconsistencies with Carrie's backstory established on Sex and the City, and is not considered canon to the earlier series.

Author Candace Bushnell expanded the character's backstory through a young adult book series, including Summer and the City: A Carrie Diaries Novel. The novel portrays Carrie attending Brown University in the 1980s and taking summer writing classes at The New School. In coverage of the CW adaptation, TV Guide described the younger version of Carrie as navigating early adulthood while experimenting with fashion and exploring relationships.

== Style and influence ==
Designers worn by Carrie Bradshaw
- Alexander McQueen, Anna Molinari, Balenciaga, Betsey Johnson, Bottega Veneta, Burberry, Céline, Chanel, Chloé, Christian Dior, Christian Lacroix, Christian Louboutin, Diane von Fürstenberg, Dolce and Gabbana, Fendi, Givenchy, Gucci, Heatherette, Helmut Lang, Hermès, Jean-Paul Gaultier, Jeremy Scott, Judith Leiber, Jil Sander, Jimmy Choo, Louis Vuitton, Lanvin, Manolo Blahnik, Marc Jacobs, Marni, Missoni, Miu Miu, Moschino, Prada, Oscar de la Renta, Roberto Cavalli, Sonia Rykiel, Tom Ford, Yves Saint Laurent, Vera Wang, Valentino, Versace, Vivienne Westwood

Carrie's wardrobe in Sex and the City is frequently portrayed as high-end and designer-focused, often appearing inconsistent with her income as a newspaper columnist, particularly before the publication of her book in season 5. Her spending habits, especially on fashion items such as shoes, contribute to recurring financial issues throughout the series, including maxed-out credit cards, minimal savings, and poor credit. In the season 1 episode "The Power of Female Sex", Carrie refers to her shoe obsession as a "substance abuse problem."

Several plot points highlight her relationship with luxury fashion. In one episode, she is mugged and loses both her Fendi Baguette clutch and Manolo Blahnik sandals—an event often credited with popularizing the baguette bag in mainstream fashion. Another signature accessory associated with Carrie is the Dior Saddle bag, which she prominently wears in the season 3 episode "No Ifs, Ands, or Butts".

Carrie is depicted as having a strong interest in fashion, once stating that she would purchase Vogue instead of dinner. Her fondness for expensive footwear is a recurring theme; in one episode, Miranda estimates that Carrie owns at least 100 pairs of shoes, each averaging around $400, totaling over $40,000 in footwear alone. The series mentions Barneys, Bergdorf Goodman, Bloomingdale's, and Saks Fifth Avenue as some of her preferred places to shop.

== Apartment ==
Carrie Bradshaw’s apartment is a central and frequently used setting in Sex and the City, its two feature films, and the first two seasons of And Just Like That.... Described by Architectural Digest as “one of TV’s most iconic apartments,” it is portrayed as a brownstone located on the Upper East Side of Manhattan at the fictional address of 245 E. 73rd Street. In And Just Like That..., Carrie states that she moved into the apartment at age 29 and had lived there for 25 years. The apartment is first seen in the pilot episode, although with a different layout; the design seen throughout the series is introduced in the second episode, "Models and Mortals," following HBO's pickup of the show.

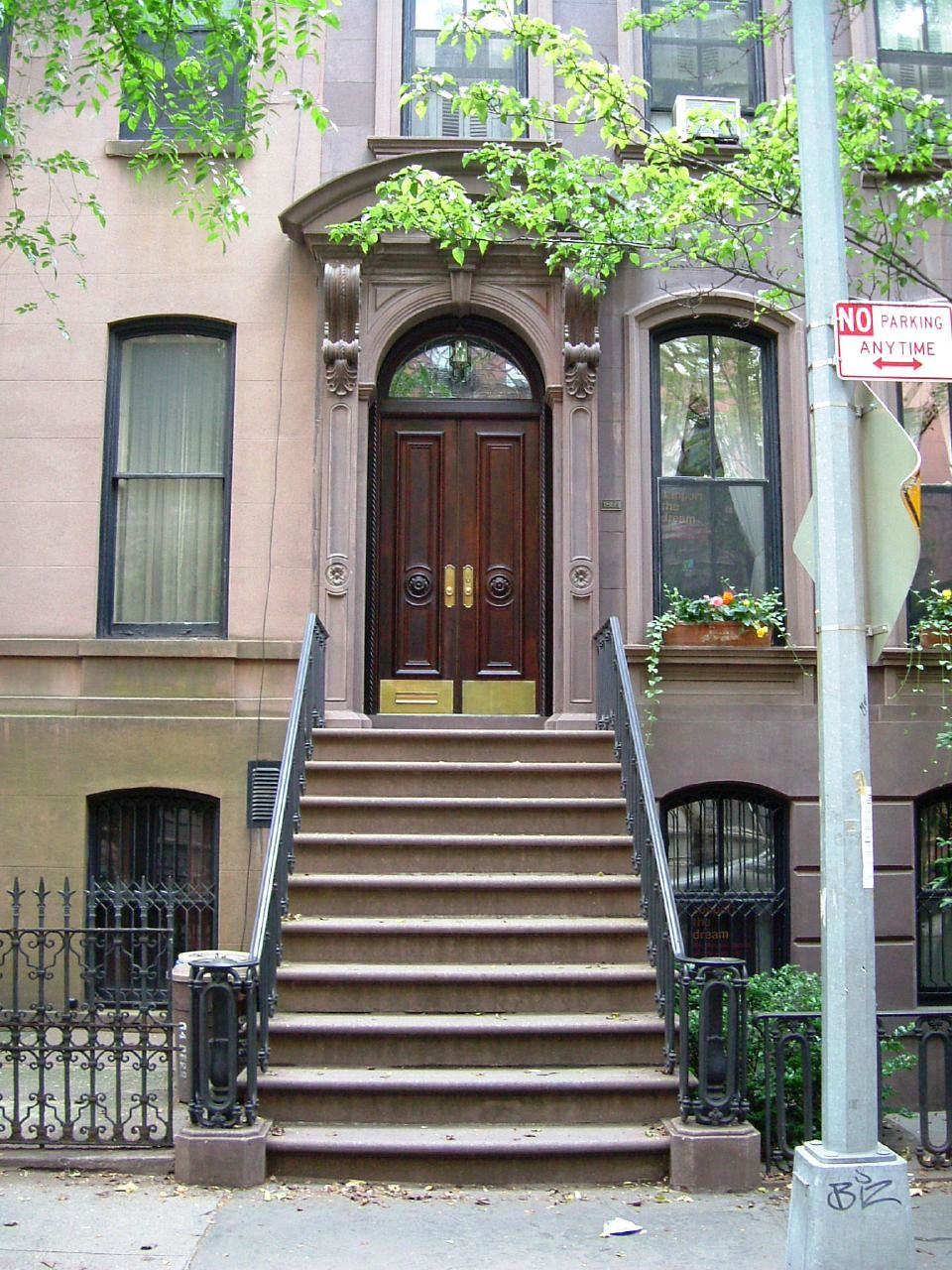
The townhouse used as the exterior of Carrie Bradshaw's apartment complex in Sex and the City.

The apartment is noted to be rent-controlled, with Carrie paying $750 per month. In Season 4, the building is converted into a co-op, requiring her to purchase the unit or vacate. Carrie is unable to afford the down payment, and her then-boyfriend Aidan Shaw buys both her apartment and the adjacent one with the intention of combining them, but following their breakup, he offers to sell it back to her at cost. Charlotte loans Carrie the funds for the down payment from the sale of her engagement ring.

In the first film, Sex and the City (2008), Carrie sells the apartment to contribute toward purchasing a Fifth Avenue penthouse with Mr. Big. After Big abandons her at the altar, she reacquires the apartment and undertakes a renovation before moving back in. In Sex and the City 2 (2010), although she lives with Big in a larger apartment, she retains ownership of the apartment and occasionally uses it as a writing space.

In And Just Like That..., the apartment continues to play a role as a pied-à-terre. Following Big’s death, Carrie sells their shared residence on Fifth Avenue and moves back into her original apartment, which she again renovates. The series also features, for the first time, the building’s lobby and the downstairs apartment. In Season 2, when she rekindles her relationship with Aidan, he refuses to enter the apartment due to its emotional associations. Carrie eventually purchases a townhouse in Gramercy Park and sells the apartment to her former neighbor Lisette.

=== Design and filming ===
The exterior of Carrie Bradshaw’s apartment building was filmed at various brownstone locations during the early seasons of Sex and the City before the production settled on 66 Perry Street in Manhattan’s West Village starting in Season 3. This location was chosen for its distinctive staircase, which became visually iconic and was used throughout the remainder of the series. The building’s exterior, often referred to as the "Bradshaw brownstone," has become a popular tourist destination. Due to the high volume of visitors, residents have expressed concerns over foot traffic, prompting the owners to install chains across the stoop and request that the address be blurred on Google Maps.

The apartment’s interior was a set constructed at Silvercup Studios in Queens and designed by production designer Jeremy Conway. It was characterized by mint green walls, mid-century modern furnishings, and vintage décor sourced from flea markets in New York City, chosen to contrast with Carrie’s designer wardrobe. In Sex and the City (2008), the apartment is renovated with blue walls, metallic and white furniture, and a more modern aesthetic; actor Sarah Jessica Parker later expressed disapproval of the redesign.

For the series And Just Like That..., a new set replicating the apartment’s updated look was built at Steiner Studios in Brooklyn. Production designer Miguel López-Castillo collaborated with Parker on the design, which includes pastel blue walls, blue carnation wallpaper, and several original set pieces from the original series that had been preserved in storage.

== Romantic history ==
Throughout The Carrie Diaries, Sex and The City, and And Just Like That..., Bradshaw has a number of short-term and long-term relationships:

=== Relationships ===
==== "Mr. Big" John James Preston ====
"Mr. Big," portrayed by Chris Noth, is Carrie Bradshaw's central love interest throughout Sex and the City. They first meet in the pilot episode, and their relationship is defined by repeated cycles of attraction, commitment struggles, and breakups. Big is depicted as wealthy, charming, and emotionally reserved. In Season 1, his reluctance to commit causes their first breakup. They reunite in Season 2, but his decision to move to Paris without consulting Carrie leads to another separation.

Big later marries a younger woman, Natasha, which shocks Carrie given his prior aversion to marriage. Carrie and Big begin an affair during her relationship with Aidan Shaw, which ends after Natasha discovers them. Carrie and Big agree they are incompatible and attempt to remain friends. Big eventually moves to Napa, California, but continues to call Carrie throughout the series. In Season 6, following heart surgery, he proposes they stop "playing games" and consider a future together. However, his continued emotional inconsistency prompts Carrie to distance herself.

In the series finale, Big follows Carrie to Paris, where they reconcile and he professes his love. Carrie returns to New York with him, and his real name—John—is revealed for the first time.

In Sex and the City (2008), the two plan a wedding after purchasing an apartment together. On the wedding day, Big experiences cold feet and fails to show up, prompting a temporary separation. They eventually reconcile and marry in a small civil ceremony. In Sex and the City 2 (2010), the couple faces challenges in married life, including differing lifestyle preferences. Carrie kisses her former fiancé Aidan while abroad but later confesses, and she and Big renew their vows. He gives her a black diamond ring as a symbol of commitment.

In And Just Like That..., Big dies of a heart attack in the series premiere. Carrie, devastated by his death, sells their apartment and later writes a book about grief.

==== Aidan Shaw ====
Aidan Shaw, portrayed by John Corbett, is a furniture designer and Carrie's boyfriend during Seasons 3 and 4. Unlike Big, Aidan is emotionally open and ready to commit. He encourages Carrie to quit smoking, and their relationship becomes serious. It ends when Carrie confesses to an affair with Big.

The two later reconcile, but tensions remain due to Carrie's continued contact with Big. Aidan proposes marriage, which Carrie accepts despite reservations. Her reluctance eventually ends the engagement. Aidan later marries someone else and has a child.

In Sex and the City 2, Carrie meets Aidan in Abu Dhabi. They kiss despite both being married, but part ways afterward.

In And Just Like That..., now divorced and living in Virginia, Aidan rekindles his relationship with the widowed Carrie. He is unwilling to enter her old apartment due to painful memories, prompting her to buy a new one. Carrie and Aidan later carry on a long-distance relationship strained by Aidan's commitments to his teenage sons. After Carrie develops a friendship with her downstairs neighbor Duncan, Aidan admits he does not fully trust her because of her affair with Big during their first relationship, and they break up again.

==== Jack Berger ====
Jack Berger, played by Ron Livingston, is a novelist Carrie meets through her publisher in Season 5. Their relationship is marked by witty banter but is undermined by Berger’s insecurities, particularly regarding his own career setbacks in contrast to Carrie’s success.

Their frequent arguments culminate in a breakup, which Berger initiates by leaving Carrie a Post-it note reading, "I'm sorry. I can't. Don't hate me." Carrie reacts with anger and frustration, viewing the breakup as immature and disrespectful.

==== Aleksandr Petrovsky ====
In Season 6, Carrie begins a relationship with Aleksandr Petrovsky (portrayed by Mikhail Baryshnikov), a wealthy and established Russian artist. Initially intended to be a casual relationship, their connection deepens and the two begin dating exclusively.

Aleksandr is portrayed as emotionally expressive and supportive, qualities that initially appeal to Carrie. However, he is also shown to be temperamental, withdrawing from Carrie and her friends during a period of creative pressure leading up to an art show. The relationship becomes more complicated when Aleksandr reveals that he has an adult daughter named Chloe and does not wish to become a parent again. Although Carrie remains uncertain about motherhood herself, she chooses to continue the relationship, and the two become more serious. Eventually, Aleksandr invites her to move with him to Paris for his upcoming show.

Carrie is conflicted about leaving New York, particularly after Miranda voices concerns about Aleksandr. Nevertheless, she decides to accompany him. Once in Paris, Carrie finds herself isolated and unfulfilled—she speaks little French and Aleksandr is frequently absent due to his professional commitments. Tensions escalate when he asks her to cancel a social engagement to support him at an early showing of his work, only to leave her alone upon arrival. Following an argument about their mismatched expectations, the two end their relationship. Carrie is later reunited with Mr. Big in Paris and returns with him to New York.

=== Lovers ===
==== Sebastian Kydd ====
Carrie has an on-again, off-again relationship with Sebastian Kydd, beginning with their first kiss at age 15. Their relationship spans the first two seasons of The Carrie Diaries and ends when Sebastian relocates to California while Carrie remains in Manhattan.

==== George Silver ====
George is Carrie's second boyfriend in The Carrie Diaries, whom she meets during her internship at a law firm. The relationship ends after an incident in which George attempts to force himself on her, prompting Carrie to break up with him.

==== Adam Weaver ====
Adam Weaver is introduced in the second season of The Carrie Diaries as Carrie's third boyfriend, whom she meets through her work at Interview Magazine. The relationship deteriorates after Weaver becomes critical of her writing and later publishes an unflattering article about her.

==== Bill Kelley ====
Bill Kelley is a politician, introduced in the third season of Sex and the City. When he meets Carrie he is running to become New York City Comptroller and during their relationship, Carrie joins him on the campaign trail, with Kelley making her dress more like a First Lady in her appearance.

Bill reveals to Carrie that she is the first woman that he has been intimate with for some time. He asks her to urinate on him when they are in the shower, which Carrie refuses to do. Shortly after, he breaks off their relationship, claiming that his campaign team team thought it was a bad idea for him to date a sex columnist so close to the election.

==== Jeremy ====
Although Jeremy first appears in season six of Sex and the City, Jeremy and Carrie were previously high-school sweethearts, with Jeremy joking that the pair "were in a lip lock for most of 1982". Despite promising that he'd always love Carrie in her yearbook she eventually broke the relationship off, believing there could be better men out there, and Jeremy ultimately moved to Denver and got married.

In the events of the season six episode Boy, Interrupted, it is revealed that Jeremy has returned to New York and has reconnected with Carrie following his divorce. While the pair try to rekindle their romance, Carrie breaks it off again after discovering Jeremy in a therapeutic community to try to figure out why some things seemed to be harder for him than they were for other people, and she concludes they are in different places in their lives.

==== Franklyn Silvias ====
Franklyn Silvias appears in the first season of And Just Like That...as the producer of Carrie's podcast. The pair share a mild flirtation throughout the show, culminating in a kiss in the elevator after the podcast is cancelled. The couple then fsll into a routine, having regular sleepovers every week. The relationship ultimately ended as Franklyn wanted more, but Carrie was not ready to take their relationship to the next level.

==== Duncan Reeves ====
Duncan Reeves is introduced in the third season of And Just Like That... as Carrie's downstairs neighbour. Initially, the pair have a frosty relationship because he complains about the noise she makes from walking around in high heels. However, they later bond over their writing careers and have a short-lived friends with benefits relationship, with Duncan returning to London once his book is published.

==== Capote Duncan ====
In Candace Bushnell’s novel Summer and the City, Capote Duncan is introduced as Carrie's classmate at The New School. Initially, she finds him arrogant and difficult to get along with, but by the end of the novel, it is revealed that he is the person with whom she loses her virginity.

==== Bernard Singer ====
Also appearing in Summer and the City, Bernard Singer is a well-known author with whom Carrie has a brief romantic relationship. She ultimately ends things upon realizing that Bernard does not reciprocate her feelings, and that she is still in love with Capote Duncan.

=== Dates ===
==== Kurt Harrington ====
Kurt Harrington is the first person that we see Carrie Bradshaw dating, appearing in the pilot episode of Sex and The City. The pair have a one-night stand and Kurt then ghosts Carrie afterwards, giving her material to write about in her column.

==== Giles ====
Giles is a French architect, who featured in the first season of Sex and The City. He had a one-night stand with Carrie a luxurious hotel before disappearing the next day leaving behind money to pay for the hotel, but no forwarding contact details.

==== Sam ====
Sam and Carrie date briefly in the first season of Sex and The City, but Carrie breaks up with him after deciding that his lack of basic essentials like coffee filters or toilet paper was unacceptable.

==== Derek "The Bone" ====
Derek is an underwear model who meets Carrie in the season one Sex and The City episode Models and Mortals. While the pair only have a fleeting physical connected, having a one-night stand, Carrie is surprised that the two have a deep emotional connection, staying up all night talking about insecurities, loneliness, and future goals.

==== Sean (Scott Rabinowitz) ====
Carrie and Sean (played by Scott Rabinowitz) date throughout the events of the season one Sex and The City episode The Bay Of Married Pigs. Carrie feels that the pair are not a match. Sean later ends up dating Charlotte York, but she breaks off the relationship after seeing his taste in china patterns.

==== Joe ====
Carrie dates NBL player Joe in the first episode of season two of Sex and The City. Despite his good looks, sense of humor, and coveted place in society, Carrie realised that she was still not over Big, with the relationship ending after Carrie cried in Joe's mouth.

==== Patrick Casey ====
Appearing in the second season of Sex and The City, the pair meet after Patrick mindlessly throws a cigarette butt in Carrie's direction and it ends up hitting Carrie on the arm, stinging her. It is later revealed that Patrick is a recovering alcoholic. Carrie breaks off their relationship after he strips naked in the street in front of her apartment, and repeatedly yelled about their tryst.

==== John McFadden ====
John is someone who has a friends with benefits relationship with Carrie. She unsuccessfully tries to move from friends with benefits to a romantic relationship in the season two Sex and The City episode The Fuck Buddy, but finds the two have little in common outside of sex.

==== Vaughn Wysel ====
Carrie and Vaughn date throughout the events of the season two Sex and The City episode Shortcomings. While the pair initially hit it off, with Carrie even meeting Vaughn's family, the relationship ultimately ends with Vaughn's inability to deal with problems arising from premature ejaculation.

==== Dr Bradley Meego ====
Carrie and Bradley date throughout the events of the season two Sex and The City episode Twenty-Something Girls vs. Thirty-Something Women. Bradley goes on holiday with Carrie and her friends to The Hamptons and also helps to diagnose Charlotte has having contracted crabs from a one-night stand. However, his and Carrie's brief relationship fizzles out after Carrie bumps in to Big and Natasha at the end of the episode.

==== Ben ====
Carrie and Ben date throughout the events of the season two Sex and The City episode The Freak Show. The relationship ends abruptly after Carrie is unable to process the trauma of past relationships, ultimately being caught snooping through all of Ben's stuff to find proof of a non-existent infidelity.

==== Jerimiah ====
Jeremiah was a performance artist and cater waiter who dated Carrie briefly in season two of Sex and The City. While their relationship seemed to have potential, especially after the two bonded singing the Three Dog Night song "Joy to the World", Carrie eventually left Jerimiah to go back to Big.

==== Jake ====
Jake met Carrie in season 2 of Sex and The City after the publication of Carrie's unflattering New York Magazine cover. Carrie ended their relationship after feeling that he took joy in her dubious newfound fame, but also after refused to let her out of his car when she asked to leave. Jake was portrayed by Bradley Cooper in his first-ever onscreen acting appearance.

==== Seth ====
Seth and Carrie date throughout the events of the season two Sex and The City episode The Games People Play. The pair sleep together after playing a game of Twister but while talking in bed post-coitus, Seth reveals to Carrie that he loses interest in women after sleeping with them.

==== Wade ====
Carrie and Wade date throughout the events of the season three Sex and The City episode Hot Child in the City. Wade is portrayed as a "man-child" who still lives with his parents. Carrie breaks off the relationship when Wade's mother finds the pair smoking cannabis in the apartment, and Wade falsely accuses Carrie of bringing the drugs into their home.

==== Keith Tavers ====
Carrie meets Keith in LA in the season three Sex and The City episode Sex and Another City. Keith tells Carrie that he "represents" Matt Damon, and the two spend a couple of days partying in V.I.P. rooms and scouting out stunning California real estate. However, towards the end of the episode Carrie Fisher arrives home, and reveals that Keith had been nothing more than an assistant squatting in his boss' house all along.

==== Sean (Eddie Cahill) ====
Carrie and Sean (played by Eddie Cahill) date throughout the events of the season three Sex and The City episode Boy, Girl, Boy, Girl.... However, Carrie eventually leaves Sean over feeling uncomfortable about his bisexuality after watching him kiss both his friends Dawn (played by Alanis Morissette) and Mark during a game of spin the bottle.

==== Ray King ====
Ray King is a jazz musician who dates Carrie throughout season four of Sex and The City. While he introduces Carrie to jazz music and chic downtown bars, she ultimately decides that his lifestyle does not make him boyfriend material.

==== Louis LeRoy ====
A naval officer who meets Carrie during Fleet Week and, in the season five Sex and The City episode Anchors Away, the pair have a brief fling while Louis is on shore leave.

==== Howie Halberstein ====
Howie Halberstein is introduced as a friend of Charlotte's husband Harry Goldenblatt in season six of Sex and The City. Howie and Carrie have a one-night stand however, both agree that the sex was "terrible", but the relationship ended when Howie publicly called Carrie out for this during a wedding party.

== Bibliography ==
Books:

- Sex and the City (a collection of her columns)
- MEN-hattan
- A Single Life
- Love Letters
- I Do! Do I?
- Loved and Lost
- Old Patterns, New York

== Appearances in other media ==
The 2000 MTV Movie Awards, which was hosted by Sarah Jessica Parker, featured a skit entitled Sex and The Matrix. During the skit, Carrie is telling Samantha, Charlotte and Miranda about her date with Neo (played by Jimmy Fallon). Her date mimics the opening events of The Matrix movie, with Carrie waking up in the real world after taking the red pill (mistakenly believing it to be recreational drugs), but later returning to the simulated Manhattan after complaining about "wearing a potato sack" and "having an outlet in the back of my head".

In 2019, Jessica Parker reprised the role of Carrie Bradshaw again for a commercial for Stella Artois aired during Super Bowl LIII. During the advert, Bradshaw and The Dude (played by Jeff Bridges, reprising his role from The Big Lebowski) enter a restaurant and shock the waiting staff and fellow patrons by eschewing their signature drinks of a cosmopolitan and a white russian respectively in favour of a Stella Artois beer.

== Cultural impact ==
Critical reception to Carrie Bradshaw tended to be positive during the show's run and in the years immediately thereafter. In 2004, Carrie Bradshaw was listed as number 11 on Bravo's 100 Greatest TV Characters. In 2009 The Guardian named Bradshaw as an icon of the decade, stating that "Carrie Bradshaw did as much to shift the culture around certain women's issues as real-life female groundbreakers." In 2010, Carrie Bradshaw was listed as the 2nd in TV Guide's list "25 Greatest TV Characters of All-Time". AOL ranked her the 41st Most Memorable Female TV Character. TV Guide named her the most fashionable TV character. Her relationship with Mr. Big was included in TV Guide's list of the best TV couples of all time. Parker received one Emmy Award, three Screen Actors Guild Awards, and four Golden Globe Awards for her performance.

In retrospective analyses of the show, critics have generally reassessed Carrie Bradshaw as an unsympathetic protagonist, despite the show's portrayal of her as a positive figure. In 2013, Glamour called Carrie "the worst" character on the show, saying that "her brattiness and self-absorption eclipsed her redeeming qualities and even her awesome shoes." In a 2010 retrospective about the previous two decades in pop culture, ABC News named Carrie one of the ten worst characters of the past twenty years, calling her a "snippy, self-righteous Manhattan snob" and citing the character's actions in Sex and the City 2 (2010) as evidence that she was beyond personal growth or redemption. The New Yorker, looking back on the show a decade after it went off the air, felt that while the character began as a "happy, curious explorer, out companionably smoking with modellizers," from the second season on she "spun out, becoming anxious, obsessive, and, despite her charm, wildly self-centered." A 2021 article in Vox cited Carrie as an example of "main character syndrome", saying, "two Carries Bradshaw exist: The flirty, quirky one we're supposed to follow through her ups and downs and the sociopathic psychic vampire who leaves her boyfriends as husks of their former selves and bullies her girlfriends for unconditional (financial!) support, all while refusing to let them have even one moment in the sun."
