= 2000 MTV Movie Awards =

American awards show

- Date: Saturday, June 3, 2000
- Location: Sony Pictures Studios, Culver City, California
- Country: United States
- Hosted by: Sarah Jessica Parker

Television/radio coverage
- Network: MTV

The 2000 MTV Movie Awards were hosted by Sarah Jessica Parker. The ceremony aired on MTV on Saturday, June 3, 2000 from Sony Pictures Studios in Culver City, California. In conjunction with the success of Sex and the City, the awards show presented a parody of Sex and the City and The Matrix during the program's opening. It featured the Sex and the City cast (Samantha Jones, Miranda Hobbes, and Charlotte York) as they listened intently as Carrie Bradshaw (Parker's character on the series) describes getting caught in the Matrix, which is shown in flashbacks and in the narration style heard usually on the television series. Laurence Fishburne appeared in the spoof in a creative superimposition from the film, as well as Vince Vaughn (playing the supposed "White Rabbit") and Jimmy Fallon, who played Keanu Reeves's character, Neo, from the film. Also, it noted Parker's status as a fashion icon by appearing in no less than 15 different costumes during the duration of the awards ceremonies, even appearing in nothing but a bath towel.

== Performers ==
- D'Angelo — "Devil's Pie"
- NSYNC — "It's Gonna Be Me"
- Metallica — "I Disappear"

== Presenters ==
- Amy Smart and Tom Green — presented Best On-Screen Duo
- Mena Suvari and Jason Biggs — presented Best Kiss
- George Clooney and Mark Wahlberg — presented Best Villain
- Seth Green and Q-Tip — introduced D'Angelo
- Katie Holmes and Jamie Foxx — presented Breakthrough Female
- Lucy Liu and Ice Cube — presented Best Fight
- Aaliyah and Freddie Prinze Jr. — presented Best Action Sequence
- Rebecca Romijn and Halle Berry — presented Best Musical Sequence
- Sarah Michelle Gellar and Chris Klein — presented Breakthrough Male
- Denise Richards and Marlon Wayans — introduced NSYNC
- Samuel L. Jackson — presented Best Comedic Performance
- Cameron Diaz and Catherine Keener — presented Best New Filmmaker
- Janet Jackson — presented Best Male Performance
- Nicolas Cage — presented Best Female Performance
- Benicio del Toro and Ryan Phillippe — introduced Metallica
- Mel Gibson — presented Best Movie

== Awards ==
Below are the list of nominations. Winners are listed at the top of each list in bold.

=== Best Movie ===
The Matrix

- American Beauty
- American Pie
- Austin Powers: The Spy Who Shagged Me
- The Sixth Sense

=== Best Male Performance ===
Keanu Reeves – The Matrix

- Jim Carrey – Man on the Moon
- Ryan Phillippe – Cruel Intentions
- Adam Sandler – Big Daddy
- Bruce Willis – The Sixth Sense

=== Best Female Performance ===
Sarah Michelle Gellar – Cruel Intentions

- Drew Barrymore – Never Been Kissed
- Neve Campbell – Scream 3
- Ashley Judd – Double Jeopardy
- Julia Roberts – Runaway Bride

=== Breakthrough Male ===
Haley Joel Osment – The Sixth Sense

- Wes Bentley – American Beauty
- Jason Biggs – American Pie
- Michael Clarke Duncan – The Green Mile
- Jamie Foxx – Any Given Sunday

=== Breakthrough Female ===
Julia Stiles – 10 Things I Hate About You

- Selma Blair – Cruel Intentions
- Shannon Elizabeth – American Pie
- Carrie-Anne Moss – The Matrix
- Hilary Swank – Boys Don't Cry

=== Best On-Screen Duo ===
Mike Myers and Verne Troyer – Austin Powers: The Spy Who Shagged Me

- Tom Hanks and Tim Allen – Toy Story 2
- Keanu Reeves and Laurence Fishburne – The Matrix
- Adam Sandler and Dylan and Cole Sprouse – Big Daddy
- Bruce Willis and Haley Joel Osment – The Sixth Sense

=== Best Villain ===
Mike Myers – Austin Powers: The Spy Who Shagged Me

- Matt Damon – The Talented Mr. Ripley
- Sarah Michelle Gellar – Cruel Intentions
- Ray Park – Star Wars: Episode I – The Phantom Menace
- Christopher Walken – Sleepy Hollow

=== Best Comedic Performance ===
Adam Sandler – Big Daddy

- Jason Biggs – American Pie
- Ice Cube – Next Friday
- Mike Myers – Austin Powers: The Spy Who Shagged Me
- Parker Posey – Scream 3

=== Best Kiss ===
Sarah Michelle Gellar and Selma Blair – Cruel Intentions

- Drew Barrymore and Michael Vartan – Never Been Kissed
- Katie Holmes and Barry Watson – Teaching Mrs. Tingle
- Hilary Swank and Chloë Sevigny – Boys Don't Cry

=== Best Action Sequence ===
The Pod Race – Star Wars: Episode I – The Phantom Menace

- End Sequence – The Blair Witch Project
- Rooftop/Helicopter Scene – The Matrix
- Sand Monster Scene – The Mummy

=== Best Musical Sequence ===
Terrence and Philip — "Uncle F**ka" (from South Park: Bigger, Longer & Uncut)

- Heath Ledger — "Can't Take My Eyes Off You" (from 10 Things I Hate About You)
- Mike Myers and Verne Troyer — "Just the Two of Us" (from Austin Powers: The Spy Who Shagged Me)
- Matt Damon, Jude Law and Rosario Fiorello — "Tu Vuo' Fa L'Americano" (from The Talented Mr. Ripley)

=== Best Fight ===
Keanu Reeves vs. Laurence Fishburne – The Matrix

- Mike Myers vs. Verne Troyer – Austin Powers: The Spy Who Shagged Me
- Liam Neeson and Ewan McGregor vs. Ray Park – Star Wars: Episode I – The Phantom Menace
- Edward Norton vs. Himself – Fight Club

=== Best New Filmmaker ===
- **Spike Jonze – Being John Malkovich**
