= Miranda Hobbes =

Fictional TV series character in Sex and the City

- First appearance: Print: "The Crotch Problem" (1995) (The New York Observer); Television: "Sex and the City" (1998) (Sex and the City)
- Last appearance: "Party of One" (2025) (And Just Like That...)
- Created by: Candace Bushnell
- Portrayed by: Cynthia Nixon
- Duration: 1998–2004; 2008; 2010; 2021–2025

In-universe information
- Gender: Female
- Occupation: Lawyer
- Family: Mrs. Hobbes (mother, deceased); Mr. Hobbes (father); Betsy (sister); David (brother-in-law, Betsy's husband); Catherine (sister); John (brother-in-law, Catherine's husband); Unnamed niece Mary Brady (mother-in-law); Paul Brady (father-in-law, deceased); Paul Brady Sr. (grandfather-in-law, deceased); Jackie Brady (sister-in-law); Mr. Brady (brother-in-law); Mrs. Brady (sister-in-law); Unnamed nephew-in-law (deceased); Patrick (cousin-in-law and godfather to Brady)
- Spouse: Steve Brady (m. 2004; div. 2021)
- Children: Brady Hobbes (son)
- Nationality: American
- Alma mater: Harvard University; Columbia University

Miranda Hobbes is a fictional character from the HBO television series Sex and the City, its film adaptations, and the sequel series And Just Like That.... The character is portrayed by Cynthia Nixon, whose performance earned her a Primetime Emmy Award and two Screen Actors Guild Awards.

== Character information ==
Miranda Hobbes first appeared in Candace Bushnell’s Sex and the City newspaper column as a cable television executive in her early thirties. In the HBO television adaptation, she is portrayed as a career-focused, Harvard-educated lawyer with a pragmatic and often cynical view of relationships and men. Over the course of the series, her outlook evolves, particularly after an unplanned pregnancy with her on-again, off-again partner, Steve Brady, a bartender whom she later marries. Their son, Brady Hobbes, introduces challenges to her typically work-centric lifestyle as she navigates the demands of motherhood. Hobbes is the first of the four main characters to purchase her own Manhattan apartment, living on the Upper West Side until the final season, when she relocates to a townhouse in Brooklyn to accommodate her growing family.

== Sex and the City: The Movie ==
In Sex and the City (2008), Miranda remains married to Steve Brady, and they are living in Brooklyn with their five-year-old son, Brady. She continues to employ her housekeeper, Magda, and it is revealed that Steve's mother, Mary, is residing in a nursing home due to advancing Alzheimer's disease. Miranda and Steve’s relationship has become strained, largely due to the pressures of work and parenting. After a brief moment of intimacy, Miranda's dismissive comment during the encounter causes tension between them. Later, during a conversation with her friends, Miranda admits they have not had sex in six months. Soon after, Steve confesses to a one-time infidelity, leading Miranda to end the relationship and move to Manhattan’s Lower East Side.

While struggling with the separation, Miranda advises Big—Carrie’s fiancé—against marriage, suggesting it ruins relationships. Her remark contributes to Big's hesitation, ultimately resulting in him abandoning Carrie at the altar. Although Miranda feels guilty, Charlotte persuades her not to take full responsibility. Miranda later confesses her role in the incident to Carrie, who confronts her over the hypocrisy of seeking forgiveness while refusing to forgive Steve. Miranda and Steve begin attending couples' therapy and agree to meet on the Brooklyn Bridge in two weeks if they both wish to reconcile.

As the date approaches, Miranda reevaluates the relationship, creating a pros-and-cons list. Upon seeing herself with a milk mustache—recalling a moment of levity with Steve—she realizes she wants to reconcile. She rushes to the bridge, where she reunites with Steve, signaling a fresh start for their relationship.

== Sex and the City 2 ==
In Sex and the City 2 (2010), Miranda is depicted as an overextended attorney struggling to balance the demands of her job with motherhood. She expresses frustration at being marginalized in the workplace, believing she is being overlooked due to her gender. After being interrupted and dismissed during a meeting, Miranda resigns from her position at Steve’s suggestion, despite initial hesitation.

Although she initially plans to return to work quickly, Miranda embraces her time off, attending Brady’s school activities and enjoying a more active role in his life. She joins Carrie, Charlotte, and Samantha on a vacation to Abu Dhabi, where she takes the lead in organizing their itinerary and demonstrates a notable effort to learn Arabic. During the trip, she confides in Charlotte about the challenges of motherhood, admitting that the pressure to be a “good” mother can be overwhelming.

Upon returning to New York, Miranda pursues a more balanced career path and secures a position at a more relaxed law firm. In the film's final scenes, she is shown participating in an outdoor staff meeting, appearing content and professionally fulfilled.

== The Carrie Diaries ==
Showrunner Amy B. Harris stated that if The Carrie Diaries had been renewed for a third season, a younger version of Miranda Hobbes would have been introduced as a character.

== And Just Like That... ==
In And Just Like That..., Miranda enrolls in a Master's degree program in human rights at Columbia University, motivated by her involvement in the Black Lives Matter movement. Her son, Brady, is portrayed as a sexually active teenager, and her marriage to Steve Brady has become strained due to their lack of intimacy. Miranda develops an attraction to Che Diaz, a nonbinary stand-up comedian and Carrie’s podcast co-host, portrayed by Sara Ramirez. The two begin a romantic relationship, prompting Miranda to end her marriage to Steve. She later declines a competitive internship opportunity in order to accompany Che to Los Angeles.

== Relationships ==
=== Skipper Johnston ===
Skipper Johnston (Ben Weber) is a 27-year-old website developer who appears in the first season of Sex and the City. Introduced to Miranda by Carrie, he enters into a tentative romantic relationship with Miranda, who finds him overly idealistic and emotionally immature. His romantic worldview contrasts with Miranda’s more cynical approach to relationships. Although they engage in an on-again, off-again relationship, Miranda does not view him as a serious partner. Skipper, in contrast, is deeply infatuated with Miranda. In one episode, he abruptly ends a sexual encounter with another woman upon receiving a call from Miranda, interpreting it as a sign of renewed interest. Miranda, disturbed by the intensity of his feelings, suggests they see other people, prompting Skipper to end the relationship. He later reappears after a breakup with another partner, drawing Miranda’s attention once more due to his emotional outburst.

=== Dr. Robert Leeds ===
Dr. Robert Leeds (Blair Underwood) is a sports medicine physician for the New York Knicks who is introduced in Season 6. Miranda meets him while serving on her apartment building's tenant board during an interview for a vacant unit. She takes a personal interest in him and the two eventually begin dating. Their relationship is energetic and affectionate, but Miranda struggles with lingering feelings for Steve Brady. At their son Brady’s first birthday party, Miranda confesses her love to Steve, effectively ending her relationship with Robert, which concludes off-screen. Although initially resentful, Robert later appears to have moved on and is last seen entertaining guests at his apartment.

=== Steve Brady ===
Steve Brady (David Eigenberg) is introduced in the second season as a bartender who meets Miranda while she is waiting for Carrie at a bar. Although Miranda initially sees him as a one-night stand, their connection deepens, and they eventually begin a relationship. Their differing socioeconomic backgrounds cause strain, leading to a breakup, though they remain on friendly terms. After Steve is diagnosed with testicular cancer and undergoes surgery, Miranda has a moment of compassion and sleeps with him, which results in an unplanned pregnancy.

Initially considering an abortion, Miranda changes her mind and informs Steve, allowing him to decide his level of involvement. Their son is named Brady Hobbes, combining both of their surnames. As they co-parent, Miranda realizes she is in love with Steve, but finds he is dating someone else. She briefly dates Dr. Robert Leeds before ultimately confessing her feelings to Steve. They end their respective relationships and reconcile.

In Season 6, Miranda proposes to Steve, and they marry in a small ceremony. They move into a townhouse in Brooklyn to accommodate their growing family. In Sex and the City (2008), Miranda and Steve separate after Steve admits to a one-night affair. They later attend couples counseling and eventually reconcile.

In And Just Like That..., Miranda and Steve’s marriage has become emotionally distant, with a lack of physical intimacy. Miranda becomes attracted to Che Diaz, a nonbinary comedian and Carrie's podcast co-host. She begins an affair with Che, ultimately ending her marriage and relocating to Los Angeles to be with them. Steve is deeply hurt by the separation, but by the end of the second season, he and Miranda begin to rebuild a cordial relationship.

== Appearances in other media ==
The 2000 MTV Movie Awards, which was hosted by Sarah Jessica Parker, featured a skit entitled Sex and The Matrix. During the skit, Miranda appears alongside Charlotte and Samantha listening to Carrie tell them about her date with Neo (played by Jimmy Fallon). Her date mimics the opening events of The Matrix movie, with Carrie waking up in the real world after taking the red pill (mistakenly believing it to be recreational drugs), but later returning to the simulated Manhattan after complaining about "wearing a potato sack" and "having an outlet in the back of my head".
