= Jenny Bicks =

American television producer and screenwriter

- Born: United States
- Occupation(s): Screenwriter, television producer

Jenny Bicks is an American screenwriter and television producer, most notable for her work as a television writer on the HBO series, Sex and the City and the creator and writer of the ABC series, Men in Trees. Her production company is Perkins Street Productions. She signed a deal with Fox in 2012.

Bicks was also a writer on the short-lived series, Leap of Faith and wrote the screenplay for the 2003 film, What a Girl Wants and the 2017 film The Greatest Showman. She made her directorial debut with the short film, Gnome. Her only known acting job was as Miss Haskell in the Drew Barrymore movie Never Been Kissed.

Bicks grew up in Manhattan, where she attended the Brearley School.

== Filmography ==
Year	Title	Functioned as		Notes
Year	Title	Writer	Producer	Notes
1998–2004	Sex and the City	Yes	Yes	16 episodes
2002	Leap of Faith	Yes	Yes	6 episodes
2003	What a Girl Wants	Yes	No	
2006–2008	Men in Trees	Yes	Yes	Creator
2010–2013	The Big C	Yes	Yes	10 episodes
2014	Rio 2	Yes	No	Screenplay
2017	The Greatest Showman	Yes	No	Screenplay
2022	Welcome to Flatch	Yes	Yes	7 episodes
