= Darren Star =

American television writer and producer (born 1961)

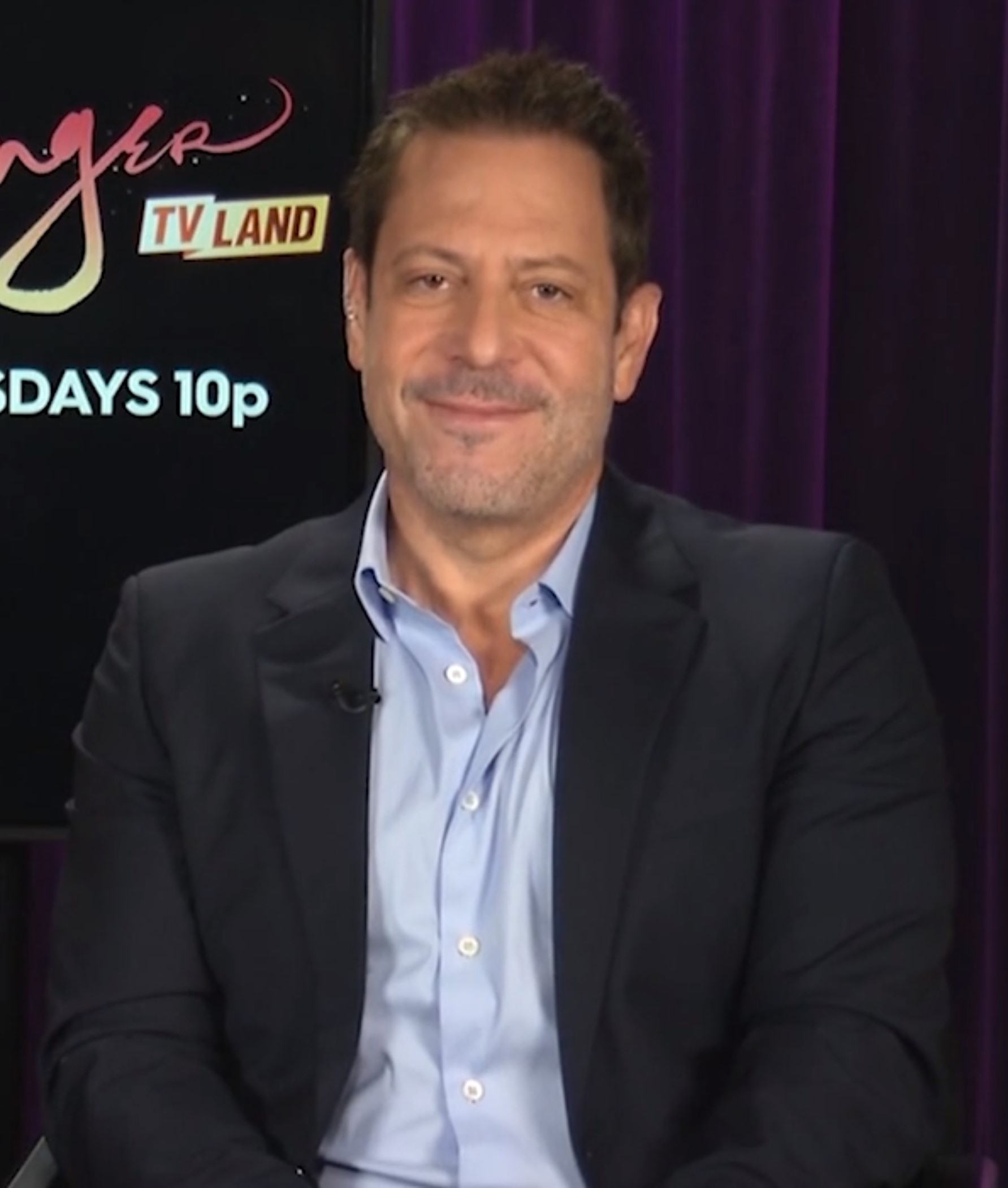
- Star interviewed on Sidewalks Entertainment about Younger in 2017
- Born: July 25, 1961 (age 65); Potomac, Maryland, U.S.
- Education: University of California, Los Angeles
- Occupations: Producer, director, writer

Darren Star (born July 25, 1961) is an American writer, director, and producer of film and television. He is best known for creating the television series Beverly Hills, 90210 (1990–2000), Melrose Place (1992–1999), Sex and the City (1998–2004), Younger (2015–2021), Emily in Paris (2020–present), and Uncoupled (2022).

== Early life and education ==
Darren Star was born to a Jewish family in Potomac, Maryland. His mother was a freelance writer and his father was an orthodontist. He attended Winston Churchill High School and UCLA where he studied English and creative writing.

== Career ==
Star created the television series Beverly Hills, 90210 based on his own high school experiences, and Melrose Place, and he was the creator and a writer for the HBO series Sex and the City.

He also worked on Central Park West (1995), Grosse Pointe (2000), The $treet (2000), Miss Match (2003), Kitchen Confidential (2005), Runaway (2006) and Cashmere Mafia (2008). He was the producer of Sex and the City: The Movie, which was released in 2008, and its sequel Sex and the City 2, which was released in 2010.

In 2002, he was the recipient of the Austin Film Festival's Outstanding Television Writer Award. He sits on the board of directors of Project Angel Food. In 2020, he signed a deal with ViacomCBS.

== Personal life ==
As of 2025, Star has a boyfriend. He has a son from a previous relationship. He has residences in New York City and Los Angeles.

== Filmography ==
=== Creator ===
- Beverly Hills, 90210 (1990–2000)
- Melrose Place (1992–1999)
- Central Park West (1995–1996)
- Sex and the City (1998–2004)
- Grosse Pointe (2000–2001)
- The Street (2000, co-created with Jeff Rake)
- Miss Match (2003, co-created with Jeff Rake)
- Younger (2015–2021)
- Emily in Paris (2020–present)
- Uncoupled (2022)

=== Screenwriter ===
- Doin' Time on Planet Earth (1988)
- Dead Heat (1988) (uncredited)
- If Looks Could Kill (1991)

=== Executive producer ===
- Melrose Place (1992–1995)
- Beverly Hills, 90210 (1992–1995)
- Central Park West (1995–1996)
- Sex and the City (1998–2000)
- The Street (2000)
- Grosse Pointe (2000–2001)
- Miss Match (2003)
- Kitchen Confidential (2005)
- Runaway (2006)
- Cashmere Mafia (2008)
- GCB (2012)
- Younger (2015–2021)
- Emily in Paris (2020–present)
- Uncoupled (2022)

=== Producer ===
- Sex and the City (2008)
- Sex and the City 2 (2010)
