= Samantha Jones (Sex and the City) =

Fictional character from American TV series Sex and the City

- Kim Cattrall as Samantha Jones
- First appearance: Print: "Loving Mr. Big" (1995) (The New York Observer); Television: "Sex and the City" (1998) (Sex and the City)
- Last appearance: "The Last Supper Part Two: Entrée" (2023) (And Just Like That...)
- Created by: Candace Bushnell
- Portrayed by: Kim Cattrall (Sex and the City, films, And Just Like That...); Lindsey Gort (The Carrie Diaries)
- Screen duration: 1998–2004; 2008; 2010; 2013–2014; 2023

In-universe information
- Nicknames: Sam; Jonesy; Sammy Jo; Annabelle Bronstein
- Gender: Female
- Occupation: Public relations
- Family: Unnamed parents Two siblings Nephew; Donna LaDonna (cousin)
- Nationality: American

Samantha Jones is a fictional character in the Sex and the City media franchise, created by Candace Bushnell. The character first appeared in Bushnell’s newspaper column Sex and the City, published in The New York Observer between 1994 and 1996, and was later featured in her 1996 book of the same name. Loosely based on one of Bushnell’s real-life friends, Samantha is depicted as a confident, sexually liberated woman in her forties who frequently engages in non-monogamous relationships.

The character was adapted for the HBO television series Sex and the City (1998–2004), where she was portrayed by British-Canadian actress Kim Cattrall. Cattrall's performance earned her two Screen Actors Guild Awards and a Golden Globe Award. She reprised the role in the feature films Sex and the City (2008) and Sex and the City 2 (2010), and made a cameo appearance in the Max series And Just Like That... in 2023. Samantha also appears in Bushnell’s young adult novels The Carrie Diaries and Summer and the City, which were adapted into the television series The Carrie Diaries (2013–2014), with Lindsey Gort portraying a younger version of the character.

== Character overview ==
Samantha Jones is one of four central characters in Sex and the City, depicted as a confident, outspoken, and sexually liberated public relations professional. Her storylines frequently center on her casual sexual encounters and short-term relationships. A self-described "try-sexual", she is portrayed as brash, direct, and highly protective of her friends. Samantha maintains a detached attitude toward dating and monogamy and often becomes uncomfortable when her relationships take an emotional turn.

Little is revealed about Samantha’s early life, though she has referenced coming from a working-class background. She spent part of her adolescence working at Dairy Queen to earn spending money. In Season 3, she mentions that her mother had three children and was married to an alcoholic, implying that Samantha has at least two siblings. She has also alluded to living in New York City since the late 1970s, referencing her time at Studio 54. Samantha has stated that she underwent two abortions, one of which occurred during her college years.

Among the four women, Samantha is the oldest, with her 50th birthday celebrated in the final scene of the film Sex and the City (2008). While the age difference is implied throughout the series, it is not explicitly discussed by the other characters. Professionally, she owns and operates her own public relations firm. In the franchise’s prequel novels, it is established that Carrie met Samantha before meeting the other women.

== Character history ==
=== Newspaper columns ===
Jones originally appeared in Candace Bushnell's Sex and the City column in The New York Observer, where she was introduced as a "40-ish movie producer" known for dating younger men. Bushnell stated that the character was inspired by a real-life friend whom she described as "kind of an expert on men and dating".

=== The Carrie Diaries ===
Gort as Jones in the Carrie Diaries TV series

In the second season of the prequel series The Carrie Diaries, a younger version of Samantha Jones is introduced, portrayed by Lindsey Gort. The character appears in her mid-twenties and is depicted as the bold and outgoing cousin of Carrie's high school rival, Donna LaDonna. Carrie and Samantha eventually become friends. Samantha is shown to be part of Manhattan’s music scene and is employed as a bouncer at a nightclub. By the end of the season, she and Carrie move in together.

=== Sex and the City ===
Samantha Jones, the oldest of the four main characters, is portrayed as an independent and successful publicist who openly embraces her sexuality and avoids emotional entanglements. She frequently pursues physical relationships and claims to have had "hundreds" of soulmates, often insisting her partners leave shortly after their encounters. Initially residing on the Upper East Side, she relocates to a luxury apartment in the Meatpacking District during Season 3. The move is prompted by an incident in which a late-night visitor inadvertently allows a mugger into her building, resulting in the assault of an elderly neighbor and conflict with other residents.

In Season 6, Samantha is diagnosed with breast cancer. She confronts the illness directly, experimenting with various wigs, hats, and headscarves after losing her hair during chemotherapy. In one episode, she delivers a speech at a cancer benefit, during which she removes her wig onstage and candidly discusses her experience with hot flashes. Her honesty resonates with the audience, prompting other women to stand and remove their own wigs in solidarity.

=== Sex and the City: The Movie ===
Four years after the events of the series, in Sex and the City (2008), Samantha is living in Los Angeles with her partner, Smith Jerrod, as he advances his acting career. Although she frequently visits New York City, she begins to feel disconnected from her life in Los Angeles. Samantha becomes attracted to her neighbor, Dante, whose uninhibited lifestyle reminds her of her own past. While she remains physically faithful to Smith, she begins to question the viability of their relationship. As her frustration grows, she turns to food as a coping mechanism, leading to noticeable weight gain.

Eventually, Samantha acknowledges her unhappiness and ends her relationship with Smith, choosing to prioritize her own well-being. She appears to return to New York City, and in the film’s final scene, she celebrates her 50th birthday with Carrie, Miranda, and Charlotte in Manhattan.

=== Sex and the City 2 ===
In Sex and the City 2 (2010), Samantha is hired by an Arab sheikh to develop a public relations campaign and is invited, along with her friends, on an all-expenses-paid luxury trip to Abu Dhabi. During the visit, the group meets Rikhard Spirt, an architect, while picnicking in the desert. Samantha later goes on a date with him and is detained for engaging in sexual activity on a public beach. Following the sheikh’s intervention, she is released, though the incident results in a permanent police record. As a consequence, the PR deal is cancelled, and their travel perks are revoked. Before leaving the country, the group retrieves Carrie’s misplaced passport from a local souk and returns to New York City. In the final scene, Samantha is shown having sex with Rikhard on a sand dune in The Hamptons.

=== And Just Like That... ===
Samantha does not appear in the first season of And Just Like That..., the sequel series to Sex and the City. She is explained to have moved to London and become estranged from the group following a falling out with Carrie, who ended their professional relationship. Despite the distance, Samantha sends flowers after the death of Mr. Big, and Carrie is shown exchanging occasional text messages with her. Before traveling to Paris to scatter Big's ashes, Carrie texts Samantha, who responds and agrees to meet in London, suggesting a potential reconciliation. In the second season, Samantha makes a brief cameo, calling Carrie to express her regret at missing the “last supper” farewell dinner at Carrie’s old apartment.

== Sexuality and relationships ==
Samantha is characterized by her open and unapologetic approach to sex and relationships. Throughout the series, she engages in numerous brief sexual encounters, often with colorful or unconventional partners. These include a man who requires her to take an HIV test before engaging in sex on a swing, a college student also named Sam Jones who wishes to lose his virginity, a partner whose bodily fluids she finds unappealing, and a personal trainer who shaves a lightning bolt into her pubic hair. She typically avoids emotional attachments, frequently insisting that her partners leave shortly after their encounters.

In one storyline, she makes a sex-tape in response to tabloid rumors suggesting she is a "fag hag", aiming to assert her sexual identity. She once jokes that she regularly loses underwear because she leaves them behind at partners’ homes. Her casual approach to sex leads to tension with her friend Charlotte when she sleeps with Charlotte’s brother, prompting a confrontation. Although Samantha rarely pursues long-term relationships, the series references a past heartbreak involving a man named Dominic Delmonico, whom she briefly reconnects with during the show’s run. She also has several more substantial romantic relationships across the series.

=== James ===
At the end of the first season, Samantha begins dating James (James Goodwin), whom she meets at a jazz bar. Unlike her usual approach to relationships, she delays having sex with him, believing he might be someone she could eventually marry. After declaring her love for him, they become physically intimate, but Samantha is disappointed to discover that James is significantly under-endowed, which affects their sexual compatibility. In the season one finale, "Oh Come All Ye Faithful," she confides in her friends that she is unable to enjoy intimacy with him and finds the experience unsatisfying. Despite attempting to resolve the issue through couples' counseling, the relationship ends after she expresses her frustration, to which James responds with a disparaging remark about her anatomy.

In the second season episode "Ex and the City," Samantha’s experience with James is humorously contrasted by her brief encounter with a man known as "Mr. Too Big," who warns her about the size of his anatomy before they attempt sex. Although initially enthusiastic, Samantha ultimately finds the experience physically overwhelming and ends the relationship mid-second encounter. The episode concludes with her unexpectedly exclaiming "I miss James!" during a dinner with her friends, suggesting that her emotional attachment to him may have been genuine despite their physical incompatibility.

=== Maria Reyes ===
In Season 4, Samantha enters into a brief but serious same-sex relationship with Maria Reyes (Sônia Braga), a Brazilian artist. Her friends are surprised—not by the fact that Maria is a woman, but by the seriousness of the relationship. Charlotte remarks that Samantha is likely not a lesbian, but simply "ran out of men." Initially, Samantha intends to remain friends with Maria, believing she is not suited for committed relationships. However, when Maria expresses her inability to continue a platonic friendship, Samantha decides to pursue a romantic relationship and kisses her.

The relationship allows Samantha to explore her sexuality from a new perspective, and she expresses curiosity about female intimacy. Over time, however, Samantha becomes dissatisfied as the sexual element of their relationship diminishes and is replaced by frequent emotional conversations. Tensions also arise when Maria confronts Samantha about her extensive sexual history. Ultimately, the relationship ends when Maria concludes that Samantha has intimacy issues, and Samantha acknowledges that she misses being with men.

=== Richard Wright ===
Later in Season 4, Samantha begins a relationship with Richard Wright (James Remar), a wealthy hotel magnate. Initially, the two appear well-matched, sharing a mutual disinterest in commitment and a preference for casual relationships. However, as their relationship progresses, Samantha develops deeper feelings for Richard and agrees to pursue a monogamous partnership. The relationship is disrupted when Samantha discovers that Richard has been unfaithful. Although she attempts to forgive him and continue the relationship, she ultimately ends it due to lingering distrust.

In Season 6, Samantha encounters Richard at a party while attending with her new partner, Smith Jerrod. She accompanies Richard to a private room where they engage in sex, but during the encounter, Samantha appears emotionally detached and conflicted. Afterward, she returns to Smith, visibly distressed, and apologizes for her actions.

=== Jerry "Smith" Jerrod ===
Samantha meets Jerry "Smith" Jerrod (Jason Lewis), a 28-year-old waiter and aspiring actor, while dining with friends at a restaurant called Raw. Initially intending to pursue a casual encounter, she returns alone and succeeds in taking him home, outlasting other women vying for his attention. What begins as a purely physical relationship—during which she refers to him simply as "Smith" in their imaginative sexual scenarios—gradually develops into something more, despite Samantha’s resistance to emotional involvement. She is initially put off by learning personal details about him, such as his status as a recovering alcoholic, but finds herself continuing to see him.

Recognizing his potential, Samantha uses her public relations expertise to boost his career, renaming him "Smith Jerrod" and helping him land modeling and acting work. He gains significant attention after posing nude in a Times Square ad campaign for Absolut Vodka, dubbed the "Absolut Hunk," which leads to a role in a Gus Van Sant film. Samantha appreciates that Smith is not threatened by her professional success, unlike some of her past partners.

Despite her initial reluctance to commit, Samantha grows emotionally attached. When Smith leaves for a film shoot, she realizes she misses him, though she struggles with the attention he receives as a rising celebrity and the difference in their ages. At a party, she has a brief sexual encounter with her ex, Richard Wright, but quickly regrets it. She returns to Smith, who forgives her, and she eventually begins referring to him as her boyfriend. The two appear to live together, and Smith is shown to have keys to her apartment.

Smith supports Samantha during her breast cancer diagnosis, even shaving his head in solidarity when she begins chemotherapy. While Samantha loses interest in sex during treatment, she encourages Smith to seek intimacy elsewhere during his film shoot in Canada. Although he initially refuses, she later changes her mind and tells him he may do so. Instead, he surprises her by returning to New York and expressing his love. Samantha responds by telling him that he means more to her than any man she has known. In the series finale, the two are shown having sex, while the flowers Smith had previously sent—initially unopened—are now in full bloom, symbolizing the growth of their relationship.

In Sex and the City (2008), the couple is still together, with Samantha having moved to Los Angeles to manage Smith’s increasingly successful acting career. However, she becomes restless with monogamy and frustrated that her life revolves around his professional schedule. Struggling with temptation and self-image, she ultimately decides to end the relationship, stating that the most important relationship she needs to work on is the one she has with herself.

In Sex and the City 2 (2010), Samantha and Smith remain on good terms. He invites her to accompany him to the premiere of his summer film, acknowledging that his career would not have been possible without her support. At the event, he introduces her to the film's Arab financier, who later offers her a professional opportunity in Abu Dhabi.

== Appearances in other media ==
The 2000 MTV Awards, which was hosted by Sarah Jessica Parker, featured a skit entitled Sex and The Matrix. During the skit, Samantha appears alongside Charlotte and Miranda listening to Carrie tell them about her date with Neo (played by Jimmy Fallon). Her date mimics the opening events of The Matrix movie, with Carrie waking up in the real world after taking the red pill (mistakenly believing it to be recreational drugs), but later returning to the simulated Manhattan after complaining about "wearing a potato sack" and "having an outlet in the back of my head".

== Reception ==
Kim Cattrall gained international recognition for her portrayal of Samantha Jones. Capitalizing on the character’s popularity, she appeared in several television commercials, including one promoting Pepsi One. For her performance, Cattrall received five Primetime Emmy Award nominations, and four Golden Globe Award nominations, winning Golden Globe Award for Best Supporting Actress – Series, Miniseries or Television Film in 2002. She also shared two Screen Actors Guild Award for Outstanding Performance by an Ensemble in a Comedy Series with her co-stars Sarah Jessica Parker, Kristin Davis, and Cynthia Nixon. In 2005, TV Guide ranked her eighth on its list of the "50 Sexiest Stars of All Time". In 2008, she received the Ultimate Icon Award at the Cosmopolitan UK Ultimate Women of the Year Awards, and was honored with the NBC Universal Canada Award of Distinction.
