= The Carrie Diaries season 2 =

The Carrie Diaries
- Season 2
- Promotional poster
- Starring: AnnaSophia Robb; Austin Butler; Lindsey Gort; Ellen Wong; Katie Findlay; Stefania Owen; Brendan Dooling; Chloe Bridges; Freema Agyeman; Matt Letscher
- No. of episodes: 13

Release
- Original network: The CW
- Original release: October 25, 2013 – January 31, 2014

Season chronology
- ← Previous; Season 1

The second and final season of the American comedy-drama television series The Carrie Diaries premiered on The CW on October 25, 2013, and concluded on January 31, 2014, consisting of 13 episodes. The series serves as a prequel to the HBO series Sex and the City.

== Cast and characters ==
=== Main ===
- AnnaSophia Robb as Carrie Bradshaw
- Samuel Giovanni as Ed Alighieri
- Austin Butler as Sebastian Kydd
- Lindsey Gort as Samantha Jones
- Ellen Wong as Jill "Mouse" Chen
- Katie Findlay as Maggie Landers
- Stefania Owen as Dorrit Bradshaw
- Brendan Dooling as Walt Reynolds
- Chloe Bridges as Donna LaDonna
- Freema Agyeman as Larissa Loughlin
- Matt Letscher as Tom Bradshaw

=== Recurring ===
- R.J. Brown as Thomas West
- Jake Robinson as Bennet Wilcox
- Scott Cohen as Harlan Silver
- Chris Wood as Adam Weaver

=== Guest ===
- Evan Crooks as Miller
- Alexandra Miller and Whitney Vance as the Jens
- Nadia Dajani as Deb
- Terry Serpico as Mr. Kydd
- Kate Nowlin as Barbara
- Josh Salatin as Simon Byrnes
- Molly Sims as Vicky Donovan
- Noelle Beck as Mrs. Kydd
- Boris McGiver as Eddie Landers
- Giullian Yao Gioiello as Scott
- Claybourne Elder as Pete
- John Boyd as Elliot

== Episodes ==
No. overall	No. in season	Title	Directed by	Written by	Original release date	Prod. code	U.S. viewers (millions)
14	1	"Win Some, Lose Some"	Andy Wolk	Amy B. Harris	October 25, 2013	4X5201	0.78
Carrie has been living at Larissa's apartment in Manhattan for the past three or four weeks of the summer with Walt as her platonic roommate. With Larissa still out of the country, Carrie has been filling in for her at Interview magazine full-time during the day and partying at local nightclubs at night. She has not seen or spoken to either Sebastian or Maggie since their falling out. But by chance during the Fourth of July weekend, Carrie runs into Sebastian when he tags along with Donna to the city to meet Donna's cousin Samantha Jones, an older woman in her late 20s, who co-manages a rock music nightclub. Carrie declines going with Walt, Sebastian, and Donna and instead goes to her regular hangout where, due to a combination of bad luck and carelessness, her valued purse gets stolen. She later has a chance meeting with Samantha who agrees to help her out of being locked out of her apartment. Back in Castlebury, Mouse invites West as her date to the local golf and tennis club's July 4th fireworks display where they find Maggie working as a waitress. Mouse is openly hostile towards Maggie for interfering with Carrie and Sebastian's relationship, but they eventually reconcile after Maggie confides in Mouse that she is only working at the country club to help herself pay for college and fears being stuck in Castlebury for the rest of her life like her parents. Elsewhere, Tom finds out about Dorrit dating Miller and wants to meet him. Dorrit tries to prevent her father from meeting Miller fearing that Tom may find out that she and Miller are in a sexual relationship and that they both take recreational drugs. Miller eventually goes behind Dorrit's back and meets with Tom where he makes a good impression upon Tom who allows Miller and Dorrit to date. Samantha crashes at Larissas loft with Carrie and Walt and Carrie finds herself with a lifelong friend.
15	2	"Express Yourself"	Amy Heckerling	Jessica O'Toole & Amy Rardin	November 1, 2013	4X5202	0.89
With the brash and man-hungry Samantha having crashed with Carrie and Walt for the past three weeks, they are both faced with kicking out Samantha when she makes herself too comfortable. Later, Walt summons the courage to tell Bennet how he feels about him when Bennet takes Walt out to a VIP Z100 concert to celebrate Walt's 18th birthday. Things go horribly wrong before Bennet can respond when Walt, Bennet, Donna, Mouse, and Carrie come down with a case of food poisoning. Meanwhile, Samantha and Mouse meet and Samantha wastes no time giving Mouse sex tips over how to "go at it" with West. Back in Castlebury, Sebastian and Maggie run into each other after three months apart. Sebastian also deals with his estranged father who comes back into town, but is more interested in business then father-son bonding. Elsewhere, Tom invites his girlfriend, Deb, to spend the weekend with him, which doesn't go exactly as planned.
16	3	"Strings Attached"	Daisy von Scherler Mayer	Doug Stockstill	November 8, 2013	4X5203	0.77
Larissa returns from her overseas vacation and gives Carrie and Walt inspiration with zen to take the next step with their lives. Larissa and Samantha take an instant dislike to each other when they first meet since Samantha's streetwise demeanor and attitude clashes with Larissa's prim and proper routine. On Carrie's first day back at school for her senior year, Sebastian asks Doritt for a little help to try to get Carrie to talk with him. Walt fears that Maggie will out his true sexual orientation. Mouse tries to get Maggie to look at more college options despite her lack of interest. Meanwhile, Samantha hooks up with a masked karate instructor as an outlet to her troubled feelings. Elsewhere, Tom is offered a job back at Harlan's law firm.
17	4	"Borderline"	Michael Fields	Heney Alonso Myers	November 15, 2013	4X5204	0.78
Carrie pitches Larissa a profile on New York wunderkind playwright Adam Weaver, but when he proves a difficult, yet fascinating, interview, Carrie's job is on the line. Bennet's rules in his relationship with Walt force Bennet to acknowledge his real feelings. Carrie and Dorrit are surprised to find a common enemy in Tom's girlfriend Deb's ill-behaved son. Meanwhile, Sebastian seeks comfort in the arms of an older woman.
18	5	"Too Close for Comfort"	Zetna Fuentes	Jessica Queller	November 22, 2013	4X5205	0.71
When Sebastian learns that his mother is getting remarried, he asks Carrie's dad, Tom, for help to make sure she is legally protected. Meanwhile, Carrie is furious when she discovers that Weaver has secretly read her journal. After reading that Carrie is a virgin and apologizing relentlessly, Carrie and Weaver have sex and Carrie experiences intimacy for the first time. Mouse volunteers to help with the Homecoming float, but tries to distance herself when West wins Homecoming King. Samantha finds herself a new place to live and another unusual job. Elsewhere, Dorrit begins to feel smothered by Miller, especially when he befriends her dad, and Donna gives Dorrit some advice resulting in Dorrit and Miller's relationship ending.
19	6	"The Safety Dance"	David Warren	Sascha Rothchild	December 6, 2013	4X5206	0.90
Carrie struggles with what she should write about in her essay. Weaver encourages her to write about what she fears the most but when Carrie decides to write about sex, Weaver tries to help her figure out something better and just ends up getting in the way leading them to later break up. Maggie and Sebastian start to grow closer as Maggie discovers some shocking news: she's pregnant! Carrie feels a potential love interest in Sebastian once again after seeing his jacket in her closet and drives to his house to tell him her feelings but instead leaves she jacket on his front floor after seeing Maggie asleep on the couch. Meanwhile, Mouse is apprehensive about applying to safety schools but West thinks it's good to be on the safe side. Walt takes drastic measures to keep himself safe when Bennet moves to a dangerous neighborhood. Also, Larissa and Samantha plan to have a threesome with Harlan but instead make a sex tape with each other after finding out Harlan is stuck in traffic.
20	7	"I Heard a Rumor"	Norman Buckley	Amy B. Harris	December 13, 2013	4X5207	0.70
Weaver makes some false accusations to the press about Carrie to prevent people from thinking anything bad about him. Samantha brings Carrie, Walt, and Bennet to an event with a raffle with a free trip to Paris as the prize. Carrie meets the journalist who wrote about her, and in spite says awful things about Weaver. Meanwhile, Sebastian lets people think that he's the father to Maggie's baby just to keep Maggie's secret about who the real father is. This makes Carrie decide to call the journalist and tells the truth, that she is the ex that Weaver had said awful words about in the paper. Maggie collapses and ends up in the hospital where she has to partake a major surgery. Elsewhere, Mouse is worried that she and West are boring and therefore tries to spice up their relationship by planting a surprise in West's backpack but then starts to freak out when the "surprise" (a topless Polaroid photo of herself) is missing.
21	8	"The Second Time Around"	Janice Cooke	Terri Minsky	December 20, 2013	4X5208	0.73
Carrie is excited when she gets the chance to interview the CEO of Bongo Jeans. But Larissa tells Carrie that the interview is Carrie's last chance to land a piece in Interview magazine or she will be let go. Meanwhile, Mouse gets some news that drives an unexpected wedge between her and West. Sebastian's estranged father delivers other news that could forever change Sebastian and Carrie's relationship. Elsewhere, Walt finds himself homeless after his conservative parents kick him out when he's forced to confess to them his sexual orientation. He moves in with Carrie where he finds a surprising father figure in Carrie's father Tom. Also, Maggie tries to muster the courage to tell her neglectful father the truth about her past relations with Simon, resulting in him getting fired. He goes to Maggie's school and confronts her about his unemployment while Sebastian and Carrie are there. Sebastian and Simon end up fighting, resulting in Sebastian getting expelled. His father supports him for fighting for Maggie and Carrie and tells him they are both moving to California since Sebastian is no longer in school. Carrie and Sebastian decide that they will have a long-distance relationship and hope things work out. Carrie's article is published in Interview magazine, Sebastian arrives in California with his dad and Walt and Bennet celebrate Christmas with Samantha and Larissa.
22	9	"Under Pressure"	Andy Wolk	Logan Slakter	January 3, 2014	4X5209	0.99
When her father's away on business for the weekend, Dorrit and her friends have a party. Carrie tries to maintain a long-distance relationship with Sebastian, only to have him show up a month later claiming that he is back for good. Mouse and Donna find common ground to talk and bond over their respective lives. Meanwhile, Tom is invited into the city by Harlan where he asks him to draw up a pre-nuptial agreement after Harlan announces his engagement to Larissa. Larissa lets Sebastian stay in her loft in Manhattan which gives him a chance to start anew.
23	10	"Date Expectations"	Amy Heckerling	Jessica O'Toole & Amy Rardin	January 10, 2014	4X5210	0.81
On Valentine's Day, Carrie becomes resentful when Sebastian breaks their dinner date in New York because of a work opportunity for him to meet an investor for his new skateboard clothing business. Walt and Bennet get devastating news that changes their future together, when Bennet learns that one of his former boyfriends has AIDS. The news sends Walt into such a panic that he flees from Bennet and the city, refusing to deal with anything or get tested for the virus. Larissa and Samantha continue their personal feud over Samantha being hired as a nude model of Lady Godiva. Meanwhile, the insecure Maggie accidentally enlists in the US Army, and she's forced to ask Mouse and Donna for help to retrieve her consent form. Elsewhere, Tom decides to use reverse psychology on Dorrit to encourage her to start dating again by play-acting as the bad parent.
24	11	"Hungry Like the Wolf"	Sarah Price	Henry Alonso Myers	January 17, 2014	4X5211	0.86
Larissa blames Bennet for slacking off since his breakup with Walt, forcing Carrie to cover for him. But when Bennet takes advantage of Carrie's generosity by continuing to skip work, she takes it upon herself to interview a professional ballerina whom Bennet was assigned to interview. Meanwhile, Samantha makes an unruly decision by seducing a married man while she is looking for a lost parakeet to claim a reward. Sebastian's future could change forever when his father arrives in town and asks for money, claiming that he is broke from a lifetime of bad investments. Meanwhile, Tom gets taken advantage of by a female lawyer which prompts Doritt to offer Tom her help. Elsewhere, Maggie seeks Mouse and Donna's advice when her potentially new boyfriend, Pete, comes to visit during his R&R.
25	12	"This Is the Time"	Jason Reilly	Sascha Rothchild	January 24, 2014	4X5212	0.90
Carrie and her friends get together for perhaps the last time before graduation from high school: the senior prom. Since all of them are dateless they attend as a group. Dorrit also tags along with her boyfriend Scott to try to stir up trouble and drama. Meanwhile, Larissa convinces Carrie to rethink her college plans by offering her a full-time job at Interview magazine. Tom learns about this and threatens to financially cut Carrie off if she does not choose to attend college first. Mouse threatens Donna with revealing a secret about Donna's future plans that could bring Donna to her knees. Walt re-thinks his current situation and decides to reconcile with Bennet. Maggie finds herself uncertain over her future with her Army boyfriend Pete. Elsewhere, Sebastian tries to hide something from Carrie when he is offered a career opportunity to move to California to further his skateboard clothing company.
26	13	"Run to You"	Andrew McCarthy	Amy B. Harris	January 31, 2014	4X5213	0.86
Carrie and all of her friends finally graduate from high school. As a result of Larissa's firing, Carrie loses her job at Interview magazine and worse still, cannot get into NYU for at least a year. Meanwhile, Maggie tries to uncover a secret about her new military man, Pete. Mouse and West get thrown together as co-valedictorians as they prepare to leave for their separate colleges. While attempting to get her life back in order, Carrie temporarily moves in with Sebastian, who's keeping a secret from her. Elsewhere, Samantha tries to get out of New York City when she has a run-in with her one-time married lover Elliot. After Larissa reveals Carrie's secret about being fired to her father Tom, he confronts Carrie about her poor judgment and refuses to take her back home. After learning about Carrie's situation, Sebastian tells her that he is moving to California to further his business and asks her to come. Larissa and Harlan have the biggest wedding of all: at the TWA terminal at JFK International Airport. In the end, Carrie makes a life changing decision to stay in New York City and try to rebuild her life by focusing on writing as well as waitressing.

== Ratings ==
Viewership and ratings per episode of The Carrie Diaries season 2
No.	Title	Air date	Rating/share (18–49)	Viewers (millions)	DVR (18–49)	DVR viewers (millions)	Total (18–49)	Total viewers (millions)
1	"Win Some, Lose Some"	October 25, 2013	0.3/1	0.78	0.2	—N/a	0.5	—N/a
2	"Express Yourself"	November 1, 2013	0.3/1	0.89	0.2	—N/a	0.5	—N/a
3	"Strings Attached"	November 8, 2013	0.3/1	0.77	0.2	—N/a	0.5	—N/a
4	"Borderline"	November 15, 2013	0.3/1	0.78	0.2	—N/a	0.5	—N/a
5	"Too Close for Comfort"	November 22, 2013	0.3/1	0.71	0.2	—N/a	0.5	—N/a
6	"The Safety Dance"	December 6, 2013	0.3/1	0.90	0.2	—N/a	0.5	—N/a
7	"I Heard a Rumor"	December 13, 2013	0.2/1	0.70	0.2	—N/a	0.4	—N/a
8	"The Second Time Around"	December 20, 2013	0.3/1	0.73	0.2	0.32	0.5	1.16
9	"Under Pressure"	January 3, 2014	0.4/1	0.99	0.1	0.28	0.5	1.28
10	"Date Expectations"	January 10, 2014	0.3/1	0.81	0.2	—N/a	0.5	—N/a
11	"Hungry Like the Wolf"	January 17, 2014	0.4/1	0.86	—N/a	—N/a	—N/a	—N/a
12	"This Is the Time"	January 24, 2014	0.3/1	0.90	0.2	—N/a	0.5	—N/a
13	"13"	January 31, 2014	0.3/1	0.86	0.2	—N/a	0.5	—N/a

In the netlet's target demo W18–34, the season premiere averaged 0.3, doubling the numbers with the following episode to 0.6. The third episode of the season slipped to 0.5 points. The fourth episode surged to 0.7, a new season high in that demo. The fifth episode of the season fell to 0.3. However, the sixth episode rose to 0.5. The seventh episode dropped to 0.4. The midseason finale rose to 0.5. The ninth episode rose again, this time to 0.6. The tenth episode dropped to 0.4. The eleventh episode rose to 0.5. The penultimate episode scored a 0.6. The season finale tumbled to 0.4.
