= The Carrie Diaries season 1 =

The Carrie Diaries
- Season 1
- Promotional poster
- Starring: AnnaSophia Robb; Austin Butler; Ellen Wong; Katie Findlay; Stefania Owen; Brendan Dooling; Chloe Bridges; Freema Agyeman; Matt Letscher
- No. of episodes: 13

Release
- Original network: The CW
- Original release: January 14 – April 8, 2013

Season chronology
- Next → Season 2

The first season of the American comedy-drama television series The Carrie Diaries premiered on The CW on January 14, 2013, and concluded on April 8, 2013, consisting of 13 episodes. Developed by Amy B. Harris, the series is based on the novel of the same name by Candace Bushnell, and serves as a prequel to the HBO series Sex and the City.

The Carrie Diaries was officially picked up for the 2012–13 television season on May 11, 2012. After Carrie's mother dies, she has to be strong and continue her life. This season revolves around Carrie and her last high school years, as well as her love life and friendships.

== Cast and characters ==
=== Main ===
- AnnaSophia Robb as Carrie Bradshaw
- Austin Butler as Sebastian Kydd
- Ellen Wong as Jill "Mouse" Chen
- Katie Findlay as Maggie Landers
- Stefania Owen as Dorrit Bradshaw
- Brendan Dooling as Walt Reynolds
- Chloe Bridges as Donna LaDonna
- Freema Agyeman as Larissa Loughlin
- Matt Letscher as Tom Bradshaw

=== Recurring ===
- Josh Salatin as Simon Byrnes
- Kate Nowlin as Barbara
- Alexandra Miller and Whitney Vance as the Jens
- Scott Cohen as Harlan Silver
- Jake Robinson as Bennet Wilcox
- R.J. Brown as Thomas West
- Evan Crooks as Miller

=== Guest ===
- Terry Serpico as Mr. Kydd
- Richard Kohnke as George Silver
- Noelle Beck as Mrs. Kydd
- Nadia Dajani as Deb

== Episodes ==
No. overall	No. in season	Title	Directed by	Written by	Original release date	Prod. code	U.S. viewers (millions)
1	1	"Pilot"	Miguel Arteta	Amy B. Harris	January 14, 2013	276056	1.61
Castlebury, Connecticut, 1984. Carrie Bradshaw comes back to her junior year of high school after her mother's death and meets her best friends Jill "Mouse" Chen, Maggie and Walt Reynolds. During her time back in school, Carrie is showing her feelings to Sebastian Kydd, a new junior and transfer student who was kicked out of his former school. Carrie's father, Tom, informs her that she can have an after-school, once-a-week internship at a law firm in New York City which she relishes as a stepping stone in her quest to leave her small town behind. During her first day in New York, Carrie meets Larissa Loughlin, an editor at Interview magazine. Larissa provides her with a fantastic new opportunity to party it up in Manhattan, but Carrie is torn when Mouse calls her to let her know that mysterious Sebastian might take her to the school dance that same night. Upon receiving a beautiful dress from Larissa to attend the party, Carrie makes her choice and joins the party. She returns home an hour past curfew to find her younger sister, Dorit, missing. Showing up early the next morning, drunk, Dorit gets an earful from Carrie about the hardships of taking their mom's place. Dorit learns to deal with her jealousy of Carrie's and their mother's relationship but both end up grounded regardless. Maggie and Walt are having a hard time as Walt thinks he is gay, while at the same time, Maggie is cheating on him with a cop, one of her father's employees. Mouse is trying to call her crush (whom she had sex with during the summer) but is left all alone in tears.
2	2	"Lie with Me"	Alfonso Gomez-Rejon	Amy B. Harris	January 21, 2013	3X7302	1.27
During Carries grounding, Sebastian is forced into a dinner meeting with his father where Donna attempts to steal him from Carrie. Mouse conveniently situated nearby sees this and immediately calls Carrie. Carrie remarks that she trusts him and Mouse warns her to ask him about it the next day. Despite him saying it was uneventful, Donna steps in and hands him back his suit jacket from the other night, forcing Sebastian to explain himself (while also revealing his feelings for her). Carrie and her sister, Dorrit are finally getting along after their mother's death and engaging in more sisterly activities. Larissa asks Carrie to do a photoshoot of her bag (that she got from her mother), but getting the purse to the photoshoot proves to be a problem when it collides with her work schedule. Telling a small lie, she dashes off to the photoshoot getting a one of a kind scarf in return from Larissa. She goes back to the law firm and brings her boss the things she asked for (giving her the scarf Larissa gave her as well) with a warning to be more obedient or her internship will be taken away. After continuously refusing to sleep with his girlfriend Maggie, Walt eventually breaks up with her as he once again struggles with his sexual orientation. Tom tries to protect Carrie by telling her that she should not be dating Sebastian because of his past background. Carrie, Dorrit, Maggie and Mouse all hang out and have a girls night.
3	3	"Read Before Use"	Daisy von Scherler Mayer	Terri Minsky	January 28, 2013	3X7303	1.38
As Carrie tries to convince her dad to let her go out on a date with Sebastian, she finds out he represented Sebastian when he got kicked out of his old school. She snoops though her dad's legal files, and discovers that Sebastian had an affair with one of his teachers, which she tells her friends about. This causes her to doubt her feelings after she and Sebastian share a kiss. Meanwhile, Maggie tries to get over the fact that she and Walt are not getting back together by throwing away all the mementos from their relationship. Mouse finally goes on a date with her boyfriend, Seth, and he reveals his feelings for her. When Carrie informs Sebastian that she knows about him and his affair with his former teacher, he decides that they should not see each other anymore.
4	4	"Fright Night"	Jennifer Getzinger	Henry Alonso Myers	February 4, 2013	3X7304	1.51
When Carrie is invited to a Halloween party in the city by Larissa, she decides to invite Walt to go with her to keep her company. Carrie is then forced to babysit Larissa, who has clearly taken too many drugs. Walt finds himself in an uncomfortable position after a male party guest kisses him. Elsewhere, Maggie convinces Mouse to go with her to Sebastian's Halloween party at the diner to help keep tabs on him. Mouse and Sebastian end up bonding and smoking marijuana, but almost get in trouble when the cop Maggie's been seeing shows up at the party. After Dorrit's attempt to sneak out of the house is thwarted, she discovers hanging out with her father isn't so bad. Walt, in an act of confusion about his sexuality, loses his virginity to Maggie.
5	5	"Dangerous Territory"	Norman Buckley	Amy B. Harris	February 11, 2013	3X7305	1.20
Carrie runs into an old friend, George Silver, at her internship and gets invited to his mother's dinner soiree in Manhattan, but her lingering feelings for Sebastian get in her way, until she sees him kissing another girl who happens to be her arch-rival, Donna. Mouse is excited about getting back together with Seth, but her worries about being bad at sex drive her to ask Walt for help. In order to hang on to a booth at the diner, Maggie takes on the cynical and vain Donna and her friends. Elsewhere, Tom loses his wedding ring, which makes him realize that Harlan might be right about moving on, accepting his wife’s death and starting to date again.
6	6	"Endgame"	David Paymer	Jessica O'Toole & Amy Rardin	February 18, 2013	3X7306	1.08
On Thanksgiving, Carrie gets in way over her head when she tries to cook the perfect dinner for her family, as well as make a positive impression on her new boyfriend George and his father Harlan when they show up at the house. Overwhelmed by the cooking, Carrie enlists Mouse to help her set and prepare the turkey. With Tom oblivious to the chaos going on in the kitchen, the misanthropic Dorrit finds a new way to emotionally torture Carrie. Meanwhile, Maggie is excited to have Thanksgiving dinner with Walt's family, but when the topic of college comes up she realizes that she hasn't put much thought into her future. Elsewhere, Sebastian learns that his neglectful and divorced mother has decided to fly out of town with her much younger boyfriend, leaving him to fend for himself on Thanksgiving with nothing but a bottle of Wild Turkey whiskey.
7	7	"Caught"	Nanette Burstein	Doug Stockstill	February 25, 2013	3X7307	1.00
Carrie continues to be torn between her new-found romantic feelings for George and her lingering feelings for Sebastian who is still dating Donna. When Larissa (still unaware that Carrie is a 16-year-old high school junior) offers her a job working at Interview magazine, Carrie must make a decision that will satisfy her own interests. Later, Carrie accompanies George to her school's Winter Wonderland themed dance where she tries to make Sebastian jealous by dancing and flaunting her new-found romance. While making out in the back of a limo, George tries to pressure Carrie into having sex with him, thus causing an end to their relationship. Meanwhile, Mouse feels that her romance with Seth is interfering with her school grades when she gets her very first 'B' on a term paper; she asks her teacher to take on an extra credit work to gain an 'A', but cannot meet the deadline in order to accompany Seth to the Winter Wonderland dance. Maggie is forced to attend the dance solo as Walt is sick, which leads her to seek company with her secret lover, Deputy Simon Byrnes. When Donna catches Maggie with Simon, she blackmails Maggie, forcing her to be her spy against Carrie. Elsewhere, Tom accompanies Dorrit to a local production of The Nutcracker in an attempt to bond with her, despite his lack of interest in the arts.
8	8	"Hush Hush"	Amy Heckerling	Marc Halsey	March 4, 2013	3X7308	1.10
When she receives an invitation from Larissa to a hip party in New York City, Carrie decides to take advantage of her school's annual senior-junior shut-in to sneak out to the city to have some fun. After Sebastian ends his relationship with Donna, he seeks Mouse's advice to help him seek out Carrie to tell her how he really feels. Meanwhile, Maggie refuses to cave into Donna's blackmail and decides to tell Walt about her unfaithfulness before he learns it from Donna, but she keeps chickening out on telling him. Elsewhere, Tom accompanies Harlan on a double date in the city. Everything comes to a head when Tom and Carrie run into each other at the club, which brings Carrie's secret world crashing down.
9	9	"The Great Unknown"	Janice Cooke	Amy B. Harris	March 11, 2013	3X7309	1.03
With Carrie forbidden from going to New York City ever again, she is told to look after Dorrit for the evening. When Dorrit goes missing, Carrie seeks out (as well as lashes out at) Sebastian, the one person who can help her find Dorrit before their father comes home. Meanwhile, the overachieving Mouse butts heads with West (guest star R.J. Brown), a popular jock who took her spot as number one student in the class. Donna focuses her sights on Walt to dig her venomous claws into him as her latest boy-toy, but Walt refuses her advances. However, both Walt and Donna end up surprising themselves by confiding in each other their secrets with Walt telling Donna about his confused sexual interests and Donna telling Walt about her older brother who is gay. Elsewhere, Tom finds himself in uncharted territory when it comes to women and turns to Larissa for advice.
10	10	"The Long and Winding Road Not Taken"	Michael Fields	Terri Minsky	March 18, 2013	3X7310	0.99
As Carrie's 17th birthday draws near, she is torn between spending the day with her friends (and a possible chance to lose her virginity with Sebastian) or an opportunity to mingle with New York's literati at a party with Larissa. Meanwhile, Mouse's continuing conflict with West brings out an uncharacteristic vindictive side to her as she sets out to try to impress a visiting Harvard alumnus in order to land a scholarship that West also wants. Donna attempts to bully Carrie into giving her a stylish new purse that Interview magazine advertises. Maggie attempts to romantically get back together with Walt who accepts her apology for being unfaithful, but refuses claiming that he just wants to be friends, which Maggie misinterprets as a sign that Walt does not love her anymore. Carrie decides to attend Larissa's party but after Sebastian drops out, she takes Walt with her instead. Carrie sees Walt interacting and becoming more friendly with Bennet (the guy who kissed Walt on Halloween), but keeps it to herself. Dorrit goes to a video store to buy a record for Carrie's birthday and is caught shoplifting cassettes. The teenage store clerk lets her off with a warning. An angered Dorrit leaves without taking her record. In the evening, their father catches her trying to pass off one of their mother's records as a gift. He forces her to go back to the record store to get a gift. At the record store she and the clerk chat, and Dorrit gets her first kiss. Meanwhile, Sebastian crashes the party and gets drunk and so Carrie is forced to drive him home in order to avoid causing a scene. Carrie finally gets to see the mansion where Sebastian lives and sees first-hand his unhappy home life when she meets his vain and selfish mother.
11	11	"Identity Crisis"	Jann Turner	Jessica O'Toole & Amy Rardin	March 25, 2013	3X7311	0.83
It is spring break and Carrie uses the entire week to work at Interview to please Larissa and secure her summer job at the magazine with pay. She answers Larissa's phone and takes a message to pick up a package for Andy Warhol. Two hours pass and Larissa still hasn't returned so Carrie takes matters into her own hands so she won't lose her job in Manhattan. Mouse is doing her best to be a productive manager for the basketball team, but accidentally causes a fight between two of the players. Carrie pretends to be Larissa and is almost attacked by the deliverer of the package's girlfriend, who Larissa is sleeping with. Sebastian and Maggie see Carrie's dad Tom making out with a woman he met at a yoga class. Walt, Bennet and Carrie go to deliver the package to Andy, and find he is in an underground secret club that changes location every week. Elsewhere, Mouse hatches an idea from Donna to get herself fired and be the common enemy of the basketball players for them to make up and stop the fight. West says he will miss Mouse and she realizes that they are not just academic enemies after all. Carrie gave the package that contained Andy Warhol's wig to his assistant and is praised for getting the package really early. Sebastian and Maggie agree not to tell Carrie about what they saw and Mr. Bradshaw realizes that he is ready to date.
12	12	"A First Time for Everything"	Patrick Norris	Henry Alonso Myers	April 1, 2013	3X7312	0.87
When Carrie inadvertently complicates things with Sebastian, she tries to fix it by taking him to Madonna's The Virgin Tour launch party in New York, but in her quest for the perfect night only makes things worse. Meanwhile, despite Mouse's best efforts to avoid West, she can't seem to deny the romantic sparks flying between them. Dorrit turns to Donna for advice about her budding love life. Elsewhere, Tom has an awkward encounter when he spends the night with his new girlfriend Deb.
13	13	"Kiss Yesterday Goodbye"	Andy Wolk	Amy B. Harris	April 8, 2013	3X7313	1.00
As the school year draws to an end, Carrie, Maggie, Walt and Mouse don't have dates for the annual prom. They decide to all go together as a group. Carrie and Sebastian get back together. However, once Maggie accidentally tells Carrie about Carrie's father and his "date" she gets upset with Sebastian. She decides to break up with him saying that their relationship is too complex. Meanwhile, Mouse explains how her parents are racist and don't want Mouse to go to the prom, or date anyone, who's not Chinese royalty so she can't go with West. Dorrit has sex with Miller, and Mr. Bradshaw decides not to date a woman because he knows his daughters wouldn't like it. Maggie finds out from Sebastian that Walt is gay and gets mad at him for lying to her. Therefore, everyone decides not to go to the junior prom because it would be too awkward. Mouse, on the other hand, has to go with her third cousin Eugene. She finds out, however, that her family were peasants not royalty, and goes to find West to go to prom with him instead. Carrie and Walt go to Larissa's going-away party in Manhattan. Larissa convinces Carrie to go back to Sebastian. Little does she know that Sebastian and Maggie are in a bar drunk and they kiss. Carrie goes to Sebastian's house and sleeps over without knowing this, although they don't have sex. The next day, Carrie goes home and finds out what happened when Maggie tells her. Upset, Carrie tells Maggie that they aren't friends anymore. Carrie then tells her father that she doesn't mind if her dad has moved on and is dating. Mouse introduces West to her parents. At the end, Carrie and Walt move to Manhattan for the summer to live in Larissa's loft.

== Ratings ==
=== DVR viewers ===
No.	Title	Air date	18–49 rating	Viewers (millions)	18–49 rating increase	18–49 total
1	"Pilot"	January 14, 2013	0.6	1.61	N/A	N/A
2	"Lie with Me"	January 21, 2013	0.5	1.27	0.2	0.7
3	"Read Before Use"	January 28, 2013	0.5	1.38	0.2	0.7
4	"Fright Night"	February 4, 2013	0.7	1.51	0.2	0.9
5	"Dangerous Territory"	February 11, 2013	0.5	1.20	N/A	N/A
6	"Endgame"	February 18, 2013	0.4	1.08	0.2	0.6
7	"Caught"	February 25, 2013	0.4	1.00	0.2	0.6
8	"Hush Hush"	March 4, 2013	0.4	1.10	0.3	0.7
9	"The Great Unknown"	March 11, 2013	0.4	1.03	N/A	N/A
10	"The Long and Winding Road Not Taken"	March 18, 2013	0.4	0.99	0.2	0.6
11	"Identity Crisis"	March 25, 2013	0.4	0.83	N/A	N/A
12	"A First Time for Everything"	April 1, 2013	0.3	0.87	0.2	0.5
13	"Kiss Yesterday Goodbye"	April 8, 2013	0.4	1.00	0.2	0.6
