= List of The Carrie Diaries episodes =

The Carrie Diaries is an American television teen drama which premiered on January 14, 2013, on The CW. The series, developed by Amy B. Harris, is a prequel to the HBO television series Sex and the City and based on the book of the same name by Candace Bushnell. On May 9, 2013, The CW renewed The Carrie Diaries for a second season, consisting of 13 episodes. On May 8, 2014, The CW canceled The Carrie Diaries after two seasons.

Over the course of two seasons, 26 episodes of The Carrie Diaries aired.

== Series overview ==
Season	Episodes	Originally released	
Season	Episodes	First released	Last released
1	13	January 14, 2013	April 8, 2013
2	13	October 25, 2013	January 31, 2014

== Episodes ==
=== Season 1 (2013) ===
No. overall	No. in season	Title	Directed by	Written by	Original release date	Prod. code	U.S. viewers (millions)
1	1	"Pilot"	Miguel Arteta	Amy B. Harris	January 14, 2013	276056	1.61
2	2	"Lie with Me"	Alfonso Gomez-Rejon	Amy B. Harris	January 21, 2013	3X7302	1.27
3	3	"Read Before Use"	Daisy von Scherler Mayer	Terri Minsky	January 28, 2013	3X7303	1.38
4	4	"Fright Night"	Jennifer Getzinger	Henry Alonso Myers	February 4, 2013	3X7304	1.51
5	5	"Dangerous Territory"	Norman Buckley	Amy B. Harris	February 11, 2013	3X7305	1.20
6	6	"Endgame"	David Paymer	Jessica O'Toole & Amy Rardin	February 18, 2013	3X7306	1.08
7	7	"Caught"	Nanette Burstein	Doug Stockstill	February 25, 2013	3X7307	1.00
8	8	"Hush Hush"	Amy Heckerling	Marc Halsey	March 4, 2013	3X7308	1.10
9	9	"The Great Unknown"	Janice Cooke	Amy B. Harris	March 11, 2013	3X7309	1.03
10	10	"The Long and Winding Road Not Taken"	Michael Fields	Terri Minsky	March 18, 2013	3X7310	0.99
11	11	"Identity Crisis"	Jann Turner	Jessica O'Toole & Amy Rardin	March 25, 2013	3X7311	0.83
12	12	"A First Time for Everything"	Patrick Norris	Henry Alonso Myers	April 1, 2013	3X7312	0.87
13	13	"Kiss Yesterday Goodbye"	Andy Wolk	Amy B. Harris	April 8, 2013	3X7313	1.00

=== Season 2 (2013–14) ===
No. overall	No. in season	Title	Directed by	Written by	Original release date	Prod. code	U.S. viewers (millions)
14	1	"Win Some, Lose Some"	Andy Wolk	Amy B. Harris	October 25, 2013	4X5201	0.78
15	2	"Express Yourself"	Amy Heckerling	Jessica O'Toole & Amy Rardin	November 1, 2013	4X5202	0.89
16	3	"Strings Attached"	Daisy von Scherler Mayer	Doug Stockstill	November 8, 2013	4X5203	0.77
17	4	"Borderline"	Michael Fields	Heney Alonso Myers	November 15, 2013	4X5204	0.78
18	5	"Too Close for Comfort"	Zetna Fuentes	Jessica Queller	November 22, 2013	4X5205	0.71
19	6	"The Safety Dance"	David Warren	Sascha Rothchild	December 6, 2013	4X5206	0.90
20	7	"I Heard a Rumor"	Norman Buckley	Amy B. Harris	December 13, 2013	4X5207	0.70
21	8	"The Second Time Around"	Janice Cooke	Terri Minsky	December 20, 2013	4X5208	0.73
22	9	"Under Pressure"	Andy Wolk	Logan Slakter	January 3, 2014	4X5209	0.99
23	10	"Date Expectations"	Amy Heckerling	Jessica O'Toole & Amy Rardin	January 10, 2014	4X5210	0.81
24	11	"Hungry Like the Wolf"	Sarah Price	Henry Alonso Myers	January 17, 2014	4X5211	0.86
25	12	"This Is the Time"	Jason Reilly	Sascha Rothchild	January 24, 2014	4X5212	0.90
26	13	"Run to You"	Andrew McCarthy	Amy B. Harris	January 31, 2014	4X5213	0.86
