= Claybourne Elder =

American actor, singer, and writer

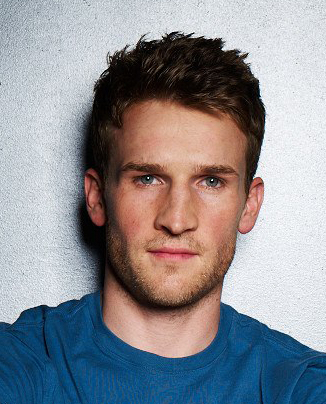
- Elder in 2013
- Born: April 21, 1982 (age 44); Springville, Utah, U.S.
- Education: Brigham Young University; University of Utah
- Occupations: Actor, singer, writer
- Television: The Carrie Diaries, The Gilded Age
- Spouse: Eric Rosen (m. 2012)
- Children: 1

Claybourne Elder (born April 21, 1982) is an American actor, singer, and writer who is best known for his work on television and on Broadway.

== Early life and education ==
Elder was born in Springville, Utah. His mother was a schoolteacher and his father was a carpenter. He is the youngest of eight siblings and was raised in the Church of Jesus Christ of Latter-day Saints. At an early age he played violin in the school orchestra.

Elder studied acting at the Moscow Klasse Centre in Russia before attending Brigham Young University (BYU). He was kicked out of BYU for being gay, and ultimately earned a degree in dramaturgy and directing from the University of Utah.

== Career ==
Elder received rave reviews and was nominated for a Drama Desk Award for Outstanding Leading Actor in A Play for originating the role of "Ollie Olson" in One Arm directed by Moisés Kaufman. He was nominated for a 2015 Lucille Lortel Award for Outstanding Leading Actor in a Musical for Allegro at Classic Stage. He originated the roles of "Buck Barrow" in Bonnie & Clyde, "Hollis Bessemer" in Stephen Sondheim's Road Show and "Michael Victor" in Venice.

He played the Soldier/Alex and understudied Jake Gyllenhaal in the Broadway revival of Sunday in the Park with George, which opened in February 2017. He also played the role in the concert performances in October 2016 at New York City Center.

Elder can be heard on the cast recordings of Bonnie & Clyde, Road Show, Venice and Sunday in the Park with George.

Elder guest-starred as Pete O'Malley in the second season of The CW's The Carrie Diaries.

Regionally, Elder played George in Sunday in the Park with George at the Signature Theatre, Arlington, Virginia, in 2014.

On Broadway, Elder played the role of Andy in the 2021 revival of Stephen Sondheim's musical Company.

Elder played Gaston in the 2023 production of Beauty and the Beast at The Muny.

Starting in 2022, Elder played John Adams (descendant of the President) in The Gilded Age. In May 2026, he joined the cast of Little Shop of Horrors replacing Andy Karl as Orin Scrivello at the Westside Theatre, Off-Broadway.

== Acting credits ==
=== Film ===
Year	Title	Role	Notes
2007	Blue Moon	Young Man	Short film
2016	According to My Mother	Hot Actor Dude	Short film
2016	Flatbush Luck	Derrick	
2019	Small Minds	Cameron Glass	Short film
2020	Netuser	Jack	Short film
2021	Bad Cupid	Henry	
2023	Mikey's Army	Chad Hartman	Short film
2024	Deck The Walls	Jake Hunter	Hallmark TV Movie

=== Television ===
Year	Title	Role	Notes
2014	It Could Be Worse	Actor	Web series, 1 episode: "Uncharted Territory"
2014	The Carrie Diaries	Pete	4 episodes: "Date Expectations," "Hungry Like the Wolf," "This Is the Time," and "Run to You"
2019	FBI	Jim Russo	1 episode: "Crossroads"
2022–2025	The Gilded Age	John Adams	12 episodes

=== Theater ===
Year	Title	Role	Notes
2008	Sweeney Todd: The Demon Barber of Fleet Street	Ensemble	Wells Fargo Pavilion
2008	Road Show	Hollis	The Public Theater, Off-Broadway
2009	Into the Woods	The Wolf / Cinderella’s Prince	Kansas City Repertory Theatre
2009	Bonnie & Clyde	Buck Barrow	La Jolla Playhouse
2010	Bonnie & Clyde	Buck Barrow	Asolo Repertory Theatre
2011	Cabaret	Clifford Bradshaw	Kansas City Repertory Theatre
2011	Cinderella	Prince Charming	Starlight Theatre
2011	Bonnie & Clyde	Buck Barrow	Gerald Schoenfeld Theatre, Broadway
2012	Pippin	Pippin	Kansas City Repertory Theatre
2013	Venice	Michael Victor	The Public Theater, Off-Broadway
2014	Sunday in the Park with George	Georges Seurat / George	Signature Theatre
2014	Allegro	Joe Taylor Jr.	Classic Stage Company, Off-Broadway
2015	Angels in America	Joe Pitt	Kansas City Repertory Theatre
2016	Do I Hear A Waltz?	Eddie	New York City Center, Encores!
2016	Oklahoma!	Curly McLain	Music Theatre Wichita
2016	Sunday in the Park with George	A Soldier / Alex u/s Georges Seurat / George	New York City Center, Off-Broadway
2017	Sunday in the Park with George	A Soldier / Alex u/s Georges Seurat / George	Hudson Theatre, Broadway
2018	Passion	Giorgio	Signature Theatre
2020–2022	Company	Andy	Bernard B. Jacobs Theatre, Broadway
2023	Beauty and the Beast	Gaston	The Muny
2024	Strike Up the Band	G. Edgar Sloane	Carnegie Hall
2026	The Wild Party	Jackie	New York City Center
2026	Little Shop of Horrors	Orin Scrivello & Others	Westside Theatre, Off-Broadway

=== Video games ===
Year	Title	Role	Notes
2013	Grand Theft Auto V	The Local Population (voice)	

=== Other productions ===
- We Chose to Go to the Moon (2026)

== Personal life ==
Elder and director Eric Rosen were married on July 28, 2012, in New York State. In 2017, they had a son through surrogacy.

In 2022, many news outlets reported a human interest story about Elder. In 2007, as a 23-year-old aspiring actor visiting New York City, he was in the standing-room section of the Broadway musical The 25th Annual Putnam County Spelling Bee when a stranger approached him, noted his obvious enthusiasm for theater, gave him $200, and told him to spend it the next night on a ticket to a revival of Stephen Sondheim's Sweeney Todd: The Demon Barber of Fleet Street. Elder did see that show and considered it—and the stranger's kindness—to be the factors that helped him decide to move to New York and pursue acting. By 2022 Elder was starring on Broadway in a different Sondheim revival, Company, alongside Patti LuPone, one of the stars of the Sweeney Todd production that so affected the course of Elder's career; at the same time, Elder was also starring in the HBO series The Gilded Age with Michael Cerveris, who had played the title role in that Sweeney Todd revival. Elder was reunited with Mark Howell, the stranger who had given him the money, and "paid forward" the favor by buying strangers tickets to Company. In July 2022, Elder retold this story on an episode of the WBEZ radio program This American Life that examined acts of kindness from strangers.
