= Mixology =

American sitcom

- Genre: Sitcom
- Created by: Jon Lucas; Scott Moore
- Starring: Adam Campbell; Adan Canto; Alexis Carra; Craig Frank; Ginger Gonzaga; Blake Lee; Vanessa Lengies; Andrew Santino; Frankie Shaw; Kate Simses
- Theme music composer: Adam Gibbons and Mikael Sandgren
- Country of origin: United States
- Original language: English
- No. of seasons: 1
- No. of episodes: 13

Production
- Executive producers: Adam Sher; Jon Lucas; Nina Wass; Ryan Seacrest; Scott Moore; Ira Ungerleider
- Camera setup: Single-camera
- Running time: 21-22 minutes
- Production companies: Lucas & Moore; Ryan Seacrest Productions; ABC Studios

Original release
- Network: ABC
- Release: February 26 – May 21, 2014

Mixology is an American sitcom that aired during the 2013–14 television season on ABC. The series was co-created by Jon Lucas and Scott Moore, who also serve as co-executive producers with Ryan Seacrest and Nina Wass for Ryan Seacrest Productions and ABC Studios. The series was green-lit by ABC for a series order pick up on May 10, 2013.

On November 19, 2013, it was announced that the series would premiere on February 26, 2014.

On May 8, 2014, ABC canceled the series after one season.

== Synopsis ==
The series takes place all over the course of one night at a Manhattan bar called "Mix", where five women and five men meet up for more than just a casual conversation and a drink. Each episode follows two or three characters as they meet each other for the first time and from there determine the outcome in the finale, which is the end of the night.

== Cast and characters ==
=== Main ===
- Adam Campbell as Ron, a failed Internet entrepreneur who is British, ends up alone. He was born in 1983 in Bath, England to parents who were alcoholics. When Ron was old enough, his parents shipped him off to an expensive boarding school. He became a hustler and moved to New York City where he became an internet entrepreneur. He, just like his parents, was the life of the party. He lost millions of dollars in investments when he used the money to buy things for himself, which is illegal.
- Adan Canto as Dominic, a dark and mysterious bartender, ends up alone. Dominic was more into superficial relationships. Ever since he was born, he was the hottest guy. He moved to New York City where he was instantly offered job by a bar he had mistakenly stumbled into. He earns more money than a normal person does, while having sex with random women. For the first time in his life he didn't get what he wanted, a successful music career. His last name is Veracruz.
- Alexis Carra as Jessica, a single mom with two kids; a son and a daughter. She was born in a bar. Ever since she was a kid, Jessica dreamed of being a fashion designer with her best friend Fab. However, she got pregnant with the lead singer in a band. At the beginning of the night, she goes to the bar to meet Ron, who promptly throws up in her purse. She later ends up friends with Bruce. In her online profile, her last name is shown to be Genser.
- Andrew Santino as Bruce, a fast-talking man and one of Tom's best friends. He was born 18 pounds and 9 ounces. He has two older brothers, Kyle and Doug who were athletic and popular but Bruce wasn't. At school, he met Dawn who he fell in love with but Dawn just saw him as a friend. He ends up becoming friends with Jessica. He is the narrator of most of the episodes, the exceptions being "Bruce & Jessica", "Cal & Kacey", "Bruce & Fab" and "Bruce & Maya".
- Blake Lee as Tom, a man recently dumped by his fiancée who hasn’t been out on the town in a decade, ends up with Maya. Tom was born in 1986 in Pawtucket, Rhode Island. Tom's father left him and his mother behind at the age of six; however, he didn't realize this until he was nine years old. Tom met Laura at a college party. After graduating college, they moved into a "very white" part of Brooklyn where they got engaged; however, she dumped him. His last name is Svencen. Tom, just like Maya, hates Hawaiians.
- Craig Frank as Cal, a handsome and confident man who is one of Tom's best friends, ends up with Kacey. He was born in Green Tree, Ohio and was delivered by a Mail man. His parents praised him for everything he did, even for just eating breakfast. This made him very optimistic and he quickly got married three times, to a woman who liked coffee yogurt, his dentist, and a sex addict, all of who he divorced soon after because they turned out to be different people than who Cal thought. His last name is Harris. He is the narrator of the episode "Bruce & Maya", since this one follows both the prior narrators.
- Frankie Shaw as Colleen "Fab", Jessica's gorgeous and stylish best friend from childhood. She is a fashion designer and ends up with a Hawaiian man. She moved to Paris to fulfill her and Jessica's dream since childhood, while Jessica raised two kids. Her whole life has been a struggle, beginning with her 32-hour birth. Her parents fought constantly during her childhood, and her move to Paris turned out to be a disaster. Hours of work amounted to little to nothing, French guys were awful, and she got fired by Nicole Scherzinger as soon as she had gotten her first big break. Her last name is Dawson. She is the only main character who does not appear in every episode, she does not appear in "Tom & Maya".
- Ginger Gonzaga as Maya, an attorney who’s as beautiful as she is brutal, ends up with Tom. Maya was born in 1984 in the front seat of her father's pick-up truck. She had her first beer one minute later. She was the third of six girls. However, her father didn't like girls, so he treated her like a boy, teaching her basketball and fighting for no reason. She earned a basketball scholarship. She dates professional athletes because she considers them "real" men, like Keyshawn Johnson who she dated for a couple of months. She is from Pittsburgh. Because she is constantly assumed to be Hawaiian, she hates them because of their restaurants and flip flops as well as their short alphabet and their sensitivity to Don Ho. She narrates the episodes "Bruce & Jessica", "Cal & Kacey" and "Bruce & Fab".
- Kate Simses as Liv, Maya’s friend who was engaged to Jim who she wants to tell him the engagement is off in favor of Ron. Liv since birth was always a happy child and didn't cry until she was seven. She has an older brother who is the exact opposite of her in every way. She was always into safe guys especially ones who wear helmets. Liv met Jim at the 59 Street Cat Adoption. She just like Jim, likes scrapbooking, cheese, and the entire CBS comedy lineup.
- Vanessa Lengies as Kacey, a bubbly cocktail waitress from West Green Tree, Ohio. She starts off the series dating Dominic and later meets Cal. She was an only child delivered by a fireman right before he put out a fire. She met her ex-boyfriend Brad at a cheerleading practice. They moved to New York City and got jobs at Planet Tan in Chelsea. Their dream was to open up a discount tan place for poor people who still wanted to be tan, but Brad turned out to be gay. Later in the night, Kacey was legitimately shocked when Dominic agreed they should take their relationship to the next level, but he didn't know what that meant.

=== Recurring ===
- Sarah Wright as Laura Johnson, Tom's self-centered ex-fiancée. She appears in the episodes "Tom & Maya", "Tom & Maya Part II" and "Closing Time".
- Jonathan Spencer as Carl, a very quiet man who works with Maya and Liv at their law firm. He gives Liv love advice when she gets engaged to Jim. He appears in the episodes "Tom & Maya" and "Liv & Ron".
- David Clayton Rogers as Jim, Liv's fiancé. He appears in the episodes "Liv & Ron", "Dominic & Kacey" and "Liv & Jim".
- Kaitlin Doubleday as Trista, a girl attracted to Bruce's hair. She appears in the episodes "Jessica & Ron" and "Closing Time".

=== Special guests ===
- Nicole Scherzinger as herself, makes an appearance in the episode "Fab & Jessica & Dominic" when Fab receives an opportunity to dress and make clothes for her.
- Alexi Lalas as himself, makes an appearance in the episode "Jessica & Ron" where he is part of the group of the girl Bruce was hitting on. Bruce immediately recognizes him, and idolizes him as the best-known ginger athlete of all time.
- Keyshawn Johnson as himself, makes an appearance in the episode "Tom & Maya" where Maya dates him for two months after he becomes a client for her firm.
- Sarah Bolger as Janey, Jessica's younger sister, who appears with Jessica in "Tom & Maya" when she is waiting for her date with Ron. Jessica shows her the pictures of Ron she has on her phone. She is credited as main cast in this episode, but does not appear in any of the other episodes, having disappeared for unexplained reasons (the actress left the show), her role as Jessica's companion being taken over by Fab. She is not mentioned in any of the flashbacks of Jessica's life.

== Development and production ==
Mixology, which is the first television project for film writers Lucas and Moore, was the subject of a bidding war among the networks in October 2012, resulting in ABC eventually picking up the project with a put pilot commitment. In February 2013, Seacrest's production company became a joint partner on the project and Wass was added to the production staff.

=== Casting ===
Of the 10 cast members who were added during the project, one of the members who was first added when it was announced, Mercedes Masöhn, decided to exit the production in March 2013 to seek other projects. She was replaced by Ginger Gonzaga a week later.

Also, in main publicity shots of the entire cast, Sarah Bolger is seen as an original cast member, but after exiting the production was replaced by Frankie Shaw.

== Episodes ==
No.	Title	Directed by	Written by	Original release date	U.S. viewers (millions)
1	"Tom & Maya" "Pilot"	Larry Charles	Jon Lucas & Scott Moore	February 26, 2014	4.98
In the series opener, Tom, after breaking up with his fiancée, Laura, is forced back into the dating world by his best friends, Cal and Bruce. Tom's first encounter is with an attorney named Maya. Despite crying about his breakup to Maya, he successfully asks for her number. The bubbly cocktail waitress, Kacey, tries to break up with Dominic due to him being too dark and her being a positive person. Jessica has a date with Ron, whom she met on the Internet, until Ron vomits in her purse. Flashbacks narrated by Bruce show Tom's early life, his meeting Laura and their breakup, as well as Maya's early and current life. Guests: Keyshawn Johnson as himself
2	"Liv & Ron"	Michael McDonald	Jon Lucas & Scott Moore	March 5, 2014	4.64
Since Liv has had an encounter with internet entrepreneur, Ron, outside the bar, the two had instant chemistry. Meanwhile, Jessica runs into her former best friend Fab, and they begin reconnecting, while both try to win the affections of the bartender Dominic. Even though he is infatuated with Maya, Cal and Bruce convince Tom to keep trying to pick up women. Even though he fails the first several times, he eventually makes a breakthrough. Flashbacks narrated by Bruce show Liv's early life and how she met her fiancé, as well as Ron's early life and his recent downfall.
3	"Bruce & Jessica"	Adam Davidson	Ira Ungerleider	March 12, 2014	4.29
Jessica, a single mom from New Jersey, is targeted by Bruce because he believes she is easy. However, Jessica rejects Bruce causing him to want her more, despite Cal and Tom's opinions. Meanwhile, Liv gets into some trouble with Ron. Maya is hit on by a group of Hawaiian men because they believe she is also Hawaiian, due to the Blue Hawaiian cocktail. Flashbacks narrated by Maya show Bruce's early life and the cause of his womanizing behavior, as well as Jessica's early life, the reason for her being a single mom, and how she copes.
4	"Cal & Kacey"	Richie Keen	Patti Carr & Lara Olsen	March 19, 2014	3.66
After hitting it off over a conversation about their hometown of Green Tree, Ohio, Cal and Kacey believe they are meant to be together due to being hopeless romantics. Meanwhile, Liv breaks more rules, with Maya's help, in an attempt to flirt with Ron. Jessica and Fab run into someone in the bathroom. Flashbacks narrated by Maya reveal the early lives of Cal and Kacey, as well as the reasons for their optimistic natures.
5	"Fab & Jessica & Dominic"	John Fortenberry	John Enbom	March 26, 2014	4.85
Jessica and Fab compete for Dominic's affections; Tom wants to make a move on Maya; Cal and Bruce go to another part of the bar after Kacey refuses to serve them. Ron seemingly forgets the time he spent with Kacey and offends her; however, Kacey turns out to have mistaken Ron as someone else. Liv and Maya also find out how many women Ron has slept with. Flashbacks narrated by Bruce reveal Dominic's easy life and secret love of music, and Fab's struggles. Guests: Nicole Scherzinger as herself
6	"Tom & Maya Part II"	Richie Keen	Vali Chandrasekaran	April 2, 2014	4.33
Things are going well with Tom and Maya, until Laura, Tom's ex-fiancée, enter the bar. Tom, Cal and Bruce try to make a quick exit strategy but when their plan fails, Maya teaches Tom how to talk to Laura. Meanwhile, Liv is interested in Jessica and Fab's ability to flirt with guys, so she asks for some pointers, while Kacey and Ron have a run in with a group of attractive firemen. Flashbacks narrated by Bruce reveal Tom's unwillingness to give up on people, and Maya's extreme willingness to do so.
7	"Bruce & Fab"	Michael McDonald	Gloria Calderon Kellett	April 9, 2014	3.65
Bruce and Fab hate each other, but as the night continues, thinks might change. Meanwhile, Tom accidentally gets into a fight with a group of guys at the bar, which gets other girls attracted to him, while Cal tries to reconcile with Kacey. Jessica shows Liv and Maya a very well-endowed photo of a man (Ron) that leaves Liv wanting more, and they try to find out who he is, with Dominic's help. Flashbacks narrated by Maya reveal Bruce's willingness to put up with anything in exchange for sex, and Fab's lack of understanding of how relationships should work.
8	"Jessica & Ron"	Eyal Gordin	Aeysha Carr	April 16, 2014	3.86
Jessica now regrets sending a nude photo to Ron after realizing she barely knows him. Meanwhile, Liv complicates things between Jessica and Ron. Maya hits it off with an attractive guy, who mistakes her for an escort. Bruce's chance to hook up comes when he meets a woman who is into red-heads, but things quickly begin to look grim. Flashbacks narrated by Bruce reveal how Jessica and Ron met online, and their reasons for doing so. Guests: Alexi Lalas as himself
9	"Dominic & Kacey"	Scott Ellis	Jared Miller	April 23, 2014	4.32
After countless encounters of meaningless sex, Kacey decides to confront Dominic about their relationship status but is shocked when Dominic wants to take the relationship to the next level. However, he doesn't even know what that means. Dominic turns to Tom for advice. Meanwhile, Liv, who has been drinking all night, is confronted by Maya and Fab who try to help her. And the chance of hooking up with someone is being ruined for Bruce and Cal as they fend off an unwanted guest. Flashbacks narrated by Bruce reveal how Dominic and Kacey started hooking up, and their very different views on the relationship.
10	"Liv & Jim"	Alex Hardcastle	John Blickstead & Trey Kollmer	April 30, 2014	3.78
Bruce gets into an argument with Tom and Cal after he finds out they watched the third season of "Downton Abbey" without him because of his constant disparaging remarks. Bruce takes offense and finds a new group of guys to hang out with, but they also start to call him out for being a terrible person. Meanwhile, Liv is forced to face her actions when her fiancé shows up. Flashbacks narrated by Bruce reveal how Liv and Jim's relationship started, and the feelings underlying it.
11	"Bruce & Maya"	Jeffrey Walker	Dave Horwitz & Maria Pinson	May 7, 2014	3.84
The night is about to end and nobody wants to go home alone once it is last call. Bruce enlists Maya to fake flirt with him to get Jessica's attention, but when things start to get serious between them, Tom comes to the conclusion that he's flirting with disaster. Meanwhile, Fab spots her attractive gynecologist, who has a thing for another woman in the bar. Liv and Ron go to a strip club. Flashbacks narrated by Cal reveal Bruce is able to get a lot of women despite his attitude, and that Maya's personality gets her a lot of men.
12	"Last Call"	Elliot Hegarty	Matt Donnelly	May 14, 2014	3.99
Tom finds himself bonding with Liv but in the process, Liv and Tom can't help but realize they might actually be meant for each other instead. Bruce starts to panic when he realizes Jessica is probably going to go home with Dominic, so he sets out to find a backup girl he can take home. Flashbacks narrated by Bruce show how similar Tom and Liv are.
13	"Closing Time"	Jon Lucas & Scott Moore	Jon Lucas & Scott Moore	May 21, 2014	4.04
On the series finale, the night is coming to an end and it's Tom's last chance to ask Maya to go home with him. Meanwhile, Bruce has to decide whether or not to be with Jessica, Liv finds herself in a situation in which she must make a decision that will ultimately affect her happiness. Kacey comes to conclusion after learning some troubling information about Cal and has to decide if she still wants to keep her date with him.

== Reception ==
=== Ratings ===
The pilot episode "Tom & Maya" debuted on American Broadcasting Company (ABC) on February 26, 2014, to an audience of 4.98 million viewers, it would become the most watched episode of the series. The second episode "Liv and Ron", one week later, drew 4.64 million viewers. The least watched episode of the series is the seventh episode "Bruce & Fab", which drew 3.65 million viewers. The finale episode of the series "Closing Time" which aired on May 21, 2014, to an audience of 4.04 million viewers.

=== Critical reception ===
Professional ratings
Aggregate scores
Source	Rating
Metacritic	48/100
Review scores
Source	Rating
Entertainment Weekly	B
Newsday	B
New York Daily News	2/5 stars

Brian Lowry of Variety gave a score of 80%, and wrote, "Maintaining this sort of rat-a-rat patter is no small feat, but the series gets off to such a promising start as to bode well for future installments. Moreover, the shifting pairings from episode to episode create a semi-serialized element that deftly builds off the groundwork laid the previous week, conjuring questions about who’s going to wind up with whom." Karen Valby of Entertainment Weekly gave the series a "B" grade, and wrote, "If you like--or like zoning out to--slick and shiny romantic comedies in the vein of New Year's Eve and Valentine's Day, Mixology is the show for you. But underneath the glossy, Ryan Seacrest-produced banner, this cocktail actually has some genuine sweetness and originality." Diana Werts of Newsday gave the series a grade of "B", and wrote, "Some twisty situations, some unexpected heart, some nuanced acting. Some serious single-camera potential. Could be worth awaiting last call to see who goes where, and why."

David Wiegand of the San Francisco Chronicle gave a positive review, saying, "The show is funny enough, although you might wonder where it would go in a second season, but here's the dirty little secret of Mixology: It's intelligent and poignant as well as being entertaining". Vicki Hyman of the Newark Star-Ledger gave a mixed review, saying, "Only intermittently funny but unceasingly crass." Matt Roush of TV Guide gave a mixed review, saying, "While some of the flirtatious banter in these random odd couplings can be witty and even winsome, after a few rounds (I made it through three episodes), I was ready to close out my tab." David Hinckley of the New York Daily News gave the series 2 out of 5 stars, and wrote, "At the end of the night, Mixology doesn’t have a lot of fizz". Robert Lloyd of the Los Angeles Times gave a mixed review, saying, "There is something mechanical and arbitrary about the plotting, as if a mess of gears that didn't actually go together had been smashed into some semblance of a working order."

Maureen Ryan of The Huffington Post gave a negative review, saying, "In its first few episodes, "Mixology" loudly and repeatedly makes the case that women (who are judged on their adherence to very limited set of rules regarding appearance, dress, behavior, etc.) are objects to be won, that men must employ elaborate stratagems to obtain sex (and only sex) with these female objects, and that even if the facade of "game" drops on occasion, sincerity and kindness are usually things to be mocked." Dan Fienberg of the HitFix gave a negative review, saying, "Nearly every character is introduced in the most repulsive way possible and then the show tries to backtrack, sell the characters out and make it seem like they're all just marshmallows." Tim Goodman of The Hollywood Reporter gave a negative, and wrote, "Mixology is a tone-deaf, poorly executed, badly written series that, in the parlance of the show, kind of rapes comedy." On Rotten Tomatoes, the series has an aggregate score of 33% based on 10 positive and 20 negative critic reviews. The website’s consensus reads: " With an uninteresting story, forgettable cast, and occasionally vulgar humor, Mixology proves a less than intoxicating blend."
