= The Cape Playhouse =

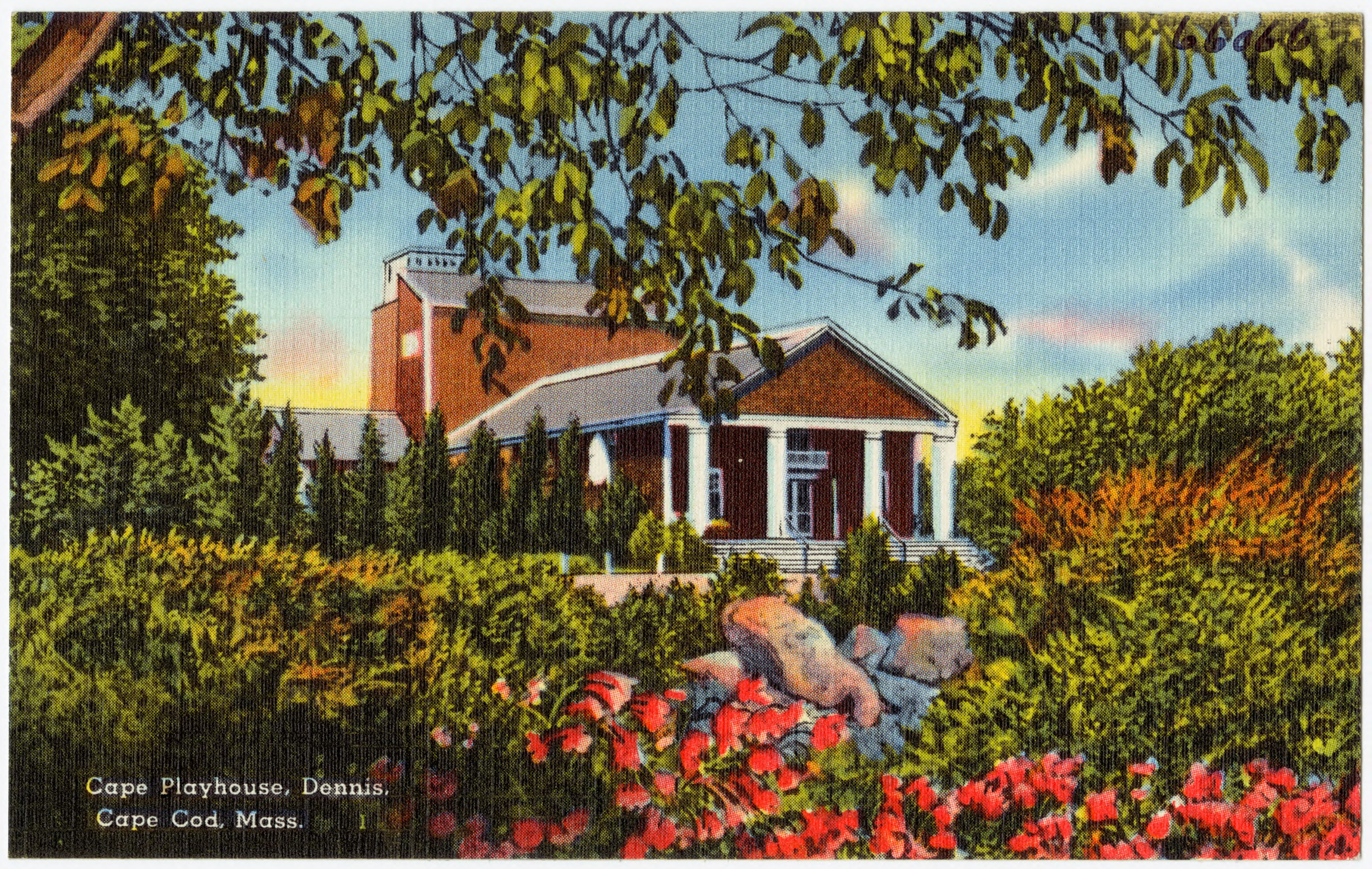
- Interactive map of The Cape Playhouse
- Address: 820 Main Street; Dennis, Massachusetts; United States
- Coordinates: 41°44′27″N 70°11′31″W
- Operator: Eric Rosen, Nora Carey
- Capacity: 542

Construction
- Years active: 1927–present

Website
- capeplayhouse.com

The Cape Playhouse is a summer theater in Dennis, Massachusetts. It is often considered the longest continuously operating summer theater in America.

== History ==
Raymond Moore moved the Dennis Unitarian Meeting House, originally built in 1838, to a 3.5-acre plot of land in 1927. He turned the church into a theater, and its first production was The Guardsman starring Basil Rathbone. After Moore’s death in 1942, the theater was run by the Raymond Moore Foundation Inc. until the foundation lost its nonprofit status in the late 1960s.

In 1967, the theater was one of the filming locations for Star! starring Julie Andrews, a film based on the life of Gertrude Lawrence, a prominent actor with a history of performing at the Playhouse who married the theater’s business manager Richard Aldrich in 1940.

As of 2016, the non-profit Cape Cod Center for the Arts has taken charge of the Playhouse, as well as its housing and shop buildings, and Cape Cinema, which is located on the same tract of land as the Cape Cod Museum of Art and Encore Bistro & Bar. The theater underwent a major restructuring in 2017, augmented its fundraising efforts, sold off two structures on the property, and started a summer camp program.

The theater paused its 2020 season because of the COVID-19 pandemic, the only time production has paused since a three-year break during World War II. The theater produced outdoor one-night events and virtual events, including classes for youth, during this time. The theater received a significant amount of money during the pandemic from federal and state relief funds, private donors, and the Dennis Community Preservation Committee.

== Recent leadership and controversy ==
In recent years, the theater has seen a good deal of executive turnover and criticism from the community, as well as active and former staff members. Employees in particular have expressed frustration at the lack of visibility of the board, their lack of action regarding failing facilities, low wages, and pressure to cut on-the-job spending.

Evans Haile served as Artistic Director from 1999-2013. Mark Cuddy was appointed CEO in 2013, but resigned suddenly in 2015 because he struggled to work with the Board of Trustees. Cuddy wrote an open letter addressing issues he faced with the board during his tenure. Cuddy had recently let one of his appointees, managing director Joe Guglielmo, go shortly before his own resignation because he believed Guglielmo was working with the board of members to undercut Cuddy’s work.

Erik Orton took on Cuddy's duties in the interim during the search for a new Artistic Director. Michael Rader was hired in 2016 as producing artistic director and resigned in 2021. He is credited with growing subscriber numbers during his tenure.

Eric Rosen began as artistic director in 2023 and is currently still in the role. Under his leadership, the Playhouse has started programming Broadway concerts and film festivals during the off season to grow the theater’s audience.

== Notable performers ==
- Tallulah Bankhead
- Humphrey Bogart
- Shirley Booth
- Caroline Bowman
- Jennifer Cody
- Bette Davis
- Olympia Dukakis
- Henry Fonda
- Jane Fonda
- Hunter Foster
- Heidi Gardner
- Janine LaManna
- Margaret Hamilton
- Andrew Keenan-Bolger
- Judy Kuhn
- Gertrude Lawrence
- Alan Ludden
- Patti Murin
- Julia Murney
- Michele Pawk
- Gregory Peck
- Basil Rathbone
- Christopher Sieber
- Mary Testa
- Betty White
- Lauren Zakrin
- Hayley Mills
