= Lina Roessler =

American actress, comedian, and producer (born 1984)

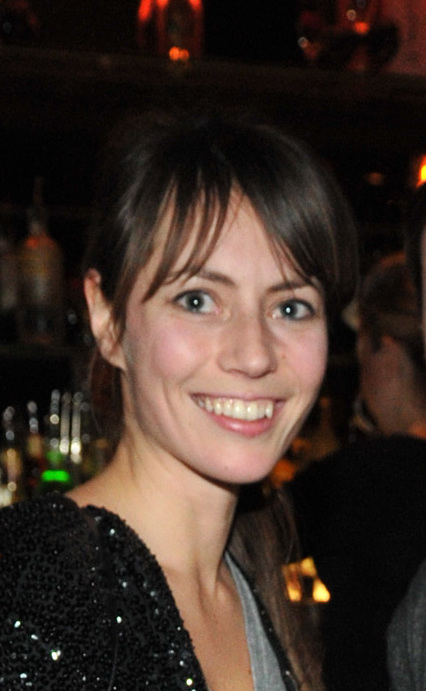
- Lina Roessler at the CFC Actors Conservatory
- Born: Lina Roessler; January 1, 1985 (age 40)
- Occupations: Actress; director; writer; producer
- Years active: 1999–present

Lina Roessler (born 1 January 1985) is a Canadian actress, director, writer and producer. She is best known as director of Best Sellers. She also has had many roles in TV and film.

== Early life ==
Roessler was born in Toronto, Canada. She studied English and creative writing at Concordia University. She also studied at the American Academy of Dramatic Arts in New York and film production at York University. She is a 2018 Berlinale Talent alum.

== Career ==
Roessler appeared in Canadian and Canadian-based productions. Roessler wrote a collection of 50 short stories and sent them to a Montreal publishing house. She then turned one of the stories into a short screenplay and shot that film in Los Angeles during pilot season. After that film won a prize at its first festival in Rhode Island "LinaRoessler - Awards"., she directed several short films before making her feature-length debut, Best Sellers, which stars Michael Caine and Aubrey Plaza.

Best Sellers was screened at Berlinale Special Gala. Speaking about the film, Roessler said that was "an opportunity that I couldn't say no to". She received the script with a message from Cassian Elwes asking her what she thought about it.

In review of Best Sellers, Slash Film wrote that "Caine and Plaza's oddball dynamic and Roessler's visually stimulating direction makes "Best Sellers" a movie that's diverting enough to cozy up with". Jerusalem Post was less favourable and wrote that film "ends up rehashing clichés on all fronts".

Roessler is currently working on two projects with Cassian and Ariel Elwes. She is also chair of Discovery Award Jury in 2022.

== Awards ==
She won several awards at Rhode Island International Film Festival."LinaRoessler - Awards".
