= Best Sellers (film) =

2021 film by Lina Roessler

- Theatrical release poster
- Directed by: Lina Roessler
- Written by: Anthony Grieco
- Produced by: Jonathan Vanger; Pierre Even; Cassian Elwes; Arielle Elwes; Wayne Marc Godfrey
- Starring: Michael Caine; Aubrey Plaza; Scott Speedman; Ellen Wong; Veronica Ferres; Cary Elwes
- Cinematography: Claudine Sauvé
- Edited by: Arthur Tarnowski
- Music by: Paul Leonard-Morgan
- Production companies: R. U. Robot Entertainment; Wishing Tree Productions; Item 7; Wacki Media Production
- Distributed by: Screen Media Films (United States); Mongrel Media (Canada)
- Release dates: March 1, 2021 (Berlinale); September 17, 2021 (North America)
- Running time: 102 minutes
- Countries: United States; Canada
- Language: English

Best Sellers is a 2021 comedy-drama film directed by Lina Roessler and written by Anthony Grieco. It stars Michael Caine, Aubrey Plaza, Scott Speedman, Ellen Wong, Veronica Ferres, and Cary Elwes.

Young Lucy Stanbridge has inherited her father's once successful publishing house. She must try to keep it afloat in face of a recent streak of disastrous releases, so she seeks the cantankerous, once best-selling writer Harris Shaw for an unpublished manuscript and go on tour with her, but he proves to be hard to handle.

The film was an official selection at the Berlin International Film Festival. It was released in the United States and Canada on September 17, 2021, by Screen Media Films and Mongrel Media, respectively.

== Plot ==
Lucy Stanbridge is a young publisher who inherited her father's once successful publishing house. To keep it afloat in face of a recent streak of disastrous releases, she and her assistant Rachel scour their list of former best sellers and find legendary author Harris Shaw owes them a book.

Rachel tries to dissuade Lucy from seeking Harris' help, as the notoriously difficult, alcoholic writer has not published a book in 50 years. Harris has some unusual stipulations in his contract, including there will be no revisions or editing of his manuscript and he in turn is obligated to do a book tour for it.

As Harris does not answer Lucy's calls, she and Rachel drive to his Westchester home. On the way, Rachel reads out loud rumors about him, including being thrown out of Ireland for disorderly conduct and accidentally shooting an assistant. Arriving to the house, as Harris is unresponsive to their knocks, they enter through the back. Lucy shows him the contract, but he drives them off with a shotgun.

Back in New York City, just as Lucy is about to sign over Stanbridge Publishing to Jack Sinclair, a reluctant Harris gives his unpublished manuscript to her. She rips up the contract with Jack and negotiates with the writer. As Harris will not let Lucy edit the book, he must go on tour with her, but his wild antics prove to be hard to handle.

At their first book reading, Harris reads a short story from Penthouse, then physically attacks the New York Times book critic. He loses most of the scheduled book readings, but picks up new ones in bars. Videos of him cursing at his audiences go viral, but they do not inspire people to buy the book.

Jack turns up on the tour, and Lucy almost agrees to sell him the company. They begin to hook up, when he lets slip that the new offer is lower, due to the detrimental tour. Lucy kicks him out, then goes to confront Harris. She loses it on him, but surprisingly he says he will read from the book at the next scheduled reading.

However, Harris is not able to do as promised. Lucy had an epiphany, and starts to get random young people to read out excerpts of the book. Uploading the videoed readings online works, and they start selling books.

On the way back to NYC, Lucy has to make a stop to check on her father, Joseph, who is in a home due to severe dementia. Seeing Harris affects him, so finally the truth comes out. Harris' wife Elisabeth edited his first book, but did not get the credit. Soon afterward, she died giving birth to a stillborn baby, sending him into a decades-long depression that left him with writer's block.

The upset Harris storms off. Hours later, he enters a bookshop, and lights up a display of books. Hospitalised, the arson has drawn attention to the book. Later on, Lucy is told that Harris' heart, lungs and liver are failing. Just as his book hits the best-seller list, she drives him to his home to live out his last days.

Lucy has tidied up the house, and retrieved his cat. Harris' creditors arrive, warning that if his $500,000 debt is not paid off they will sell the house. She sells Stanbridge Publishing to Jack, then forces him to leave at gunpoint.

Lucy cares for Harris until he passes away a short time later. She spreads his ashes in the same spot where they had spread Elisabeth's not long ago. Afterwards, Lucy finds a type-written note in his typewriter that directs her to a trunk full of unpublished manuscripts in the attic, and authorises her to edit them. She calls Rachel to enlist her help in editing the works for posthumous publication.

== Cast ==
- Michael Caine as Harris Shaw
- Aubrey Plaza as Lucy Stanbridge
- Scott Speedman as Jack Sinclair
- Ellen Wong as Rachel Spence
- Cary Elwes as Halpren Nolan
- Veronica Ferres as Drew Davis

== Production ==
The script was awarded a prestigious Nicholl Fellowship in Screenwriting in 2015.

The project was announced in May 2019 while it was being sold during the Cannes Film Festival. Michael Caine was cast to star, with Lina Roessler set to make her directorial debut. Filming was originally set to begin in July that year. However no additional news was announced until November, when Aubrey Plaza and Scott Speedman were added to the cast. In December, Ellen Wong and Cary Elwes joined the cast of the film.

Filming began in November 2019 in Montreal, Quebec, with filming expected to continue until December 12.

== Release ==
The film was selected but did not have its world premiere at the Berlin International Film Festival in March due to the COVID-19 pandemic. In July 2021, Screen Media Films acquired U.S. distribution rights to the film. It was released in the United States and Canada on September 17, 2021.

== Reception ==
On the review aggregator website Rotten Tomatoes, 53% of 55 critics' reviews are positive, with an average rating of 5.4/10.
