= Blake Lee =

American actor

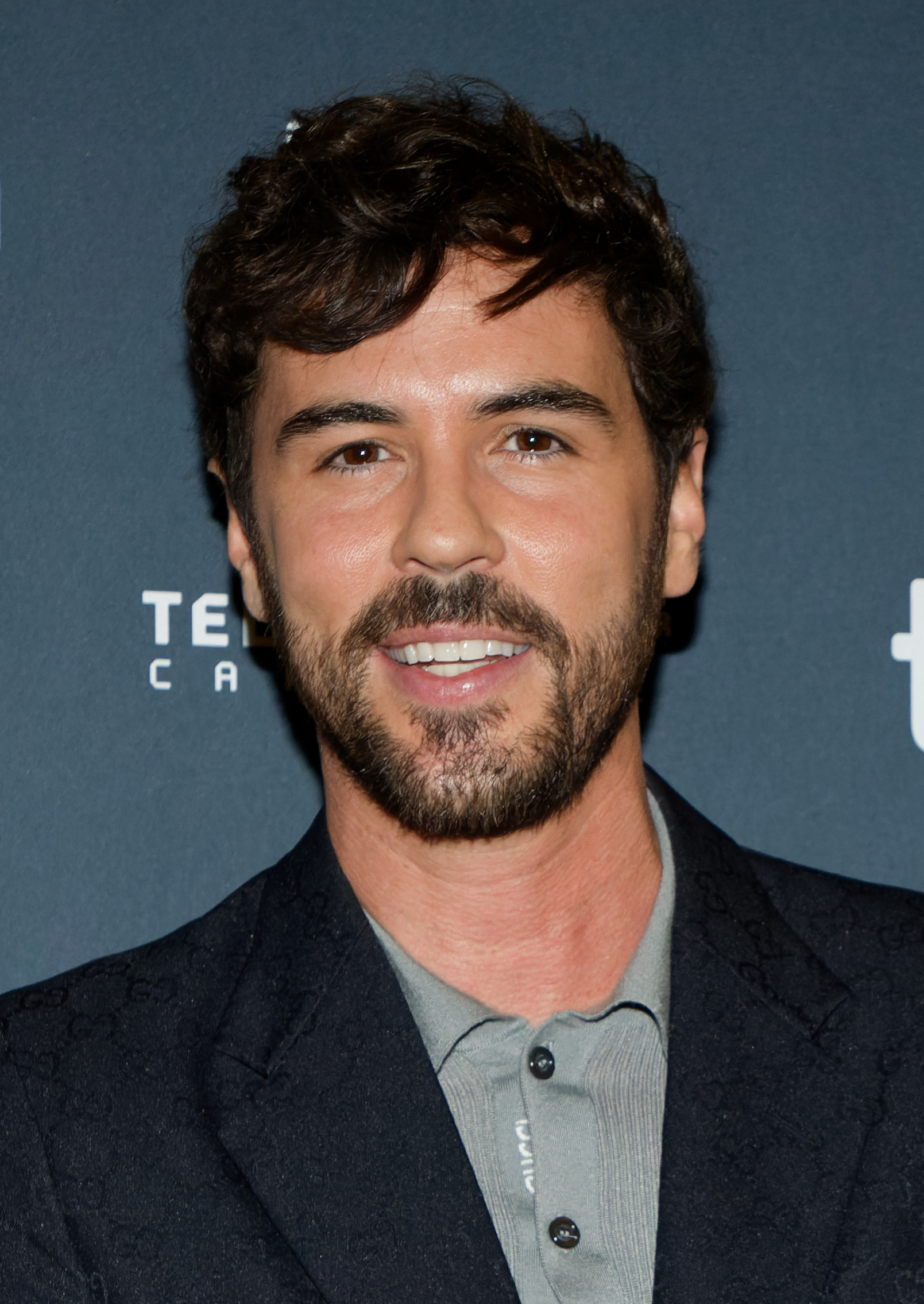
- Lee at the 2024 Toronto International Film Festival
- Born: August 31, 1983 (age 42); Miami, Florida, U.S.
- Occupation: Actor
- Years active: 2009–present
- Spouse: Ben Lewis (m. 2016)

Blake Lee (born August 31, 1983) is an American actor, known for his roles on Mixology, Parks and Recreation and the Freeform hit Cruel Summer. Blake and his husband Ben Lewis made history starring in The Christmas Setup, Lifetime's first Christmas movie centered around a gay love story.

== Career ==
Lee began his professional acting career in 2009, when he made his television debut in the political satire mockumentary sitcom series Parks and Recreation, where he recurred as a guest star as Derek. Lee was cast in the main role of Tom in the sitcom series Mixology. Lee appeared in the 2015 biographical drama film I Am Michael portraying Benoit Denizet-Lewis, which premiered at the Sundance Film Festival on January 29, 2015.

From 2017 to 2018, he was cast to play the main role in the crime drama series Wisdom of the Crowd opposite Jeremy Piven, Monica Potter, Richard T. Jones, Natalia Tena and Jake Matthews, in which he played the main role of Josh Novak. He was cast as Barry in the comedy series Overthinking with Kat & June, which was premiered on December 19, 2018, on YouTube Premium. In 2019, he had a recurring role in the sitcom series Fam portraying Ben.

In early 2020, Lee starred in the romantic comedy movie by Pat Mills titled The Christmas Setup with Ben Lewis, it is the first LGBTQ-themed Christmas film ever broadcast by Lifetime.

In 2021, Lee appeared on the first season of the teen drama mystery thriller anthology series Cruel Summer, in which he played the main antagonist role of Martin Harris.

== Personal life ==
Lee is married to actor and writer Ben Lewis. The couple met in the Grauman's Chinese Theatre bathroom at the Scott Pilgrim vs. the World premiere.

== Filmography ==
=== Film ===
Year	Title	Role
2015	I Am Michael	Benoit Denizet-Lewis
2016	The Wedding Party	Jim
2021	The Pig People	Peter
2024	Shell	Sebastian

=== Television ===
Year	Title	Role	Notes
2009–2011	Parks and Recreation	Derek	7 episodes
2011	Friends with Benefits	Dean	Episode: "The Benefit of Keeping Your Ego in Check"
2014	Mixology	Tom	Main role; 13 episodes
2015	Mix	Finn McDonnell	Television film
2015	The Astronaut Wives Club	Mystery Reporter	Episode: "Abort"
2016	Good Fortune	Metzger	Pilot
2016	Good Fortune	Metzger	Television film
2016	Angie Tribeca	Sebastian	Episode: "Contains Graphic Designer Violence"
2017–2018	Wisdom of the Crowd	Josh Novak	Main role; 13 episodes
2018	Overthinking with Kat & June	Barry	Main role; 3 episodes
2019	Fam	Ben	6 episodes
2020	The Christmas Setup	Patrick Ryan	Television film
2020	Delilah	Gordon	Television film
2021	Cruel Summer	Martin Harris	Series Regular
2023	Gay Pride & Prejudice	Bennet	Lead role; Podcast series
TBA	Married with Friends	Arthur	Main role
