= Overthinking with Kat & June =

American comedy series

- Genre: Comedy
- Created by: Mackenzie Yeager
- Starring: Alexia Dox; Tenea Intriago; Sasheer Zamata; Blake Lee; Elizabeth Hinkler; Emily Hinkler; Burl Moseley; Madeleine Byrne; Montana Roesch; Justin Kirk; Kelli Goss; Jessika Van; Aaron Takahashi; Kevin Bigley; Nick Fink; Stephen Ellis; Constance Marie; David L. King; Amanda Foreman
- Composer: Cormac Bluestone
- Country of origin: United States
- Original language: English
- No. of seasons: 1
- No. of episodes: 6

Production
- Executive producers: Shelley Zimmerman; Shauna Phelan; Jordan Levin; Joe Davola; Brett Bouttier; Don Dunn; Heath Cullens; Jen Braeden; Mackenzie Yeager
- Producer: Scott Levine
- Cinematography: Andrew Mueller
- Editors: Adam Beamer; Matthew Diezel; Braden Friedman; Jeff Wright
- Camera setup: Single-camera
- Running time: 21–23 minutes
- Production company: AwesomenessTV

Original release
- Network: YouTube Premium
- Release: December 19, 2018

Overthinking with Kat & June is an American comedy web series, created by Mackenzie Yeager, that premiered on December 19, 2018, on YouTube Premium. The series stars an ensemble cast featuring Alexia Dox, Tenea Intriago, Sasheer Zamata, Blake Lee, Elizabeth Hinkler, Emily Hinkler, Burl Moseley, Madeleine Byrne, Montana Roesch, Justin Kirk, Kelli Goss, Jessika Van, Aaron Takahashi, Kevin Bigley, Nick Fink, Stephen Ellis, Constance Marie, David L. King, and Amanda Foreman.

On March 25, 2019, YouTube Premium cancelled the series after one season.

== Premise ==
Overthinking with Kat & June is about "the birth of a strange but beautiful female friendship, the hopes, dreams and fears, but mostly fears of the duo are heard out loud."

== Cast and characters ==
=== Main ===
- Alexia Dox as June
- Tenea Intriago as Kat
- Sasheer Zamata as Tiff
- Blake Lee as Barry
- Elizabeth Hinkler as Molly
- Emily Hinkler as Tessa
- Burl Moseley as Bobby
- Madeleine Byrne as Angelica
- Montana Roesch as Eve
- Justin Kirk as David
- Kelli Goss as Candace
- Jessika Van as Astrid
- Aaron Takahashi as Econ
- Kevin Bigley as Kevin
- Nick Fink as Tyler
- Stephen Ellis as Mitch
- Constance Marie as Lucinda Renoir Souza
- David L. King
- Amanda Foreman

=== Recurring ===
- Simmi Singh as Claire

=== Guest ===
- Heath Cullens as Heath the Frisbee Guy ("The Icebreaker Cometh")
- Motoki Maxted as Max the Frisbee Guy ("The Icebreaker Cometh")
- Jadon Cole as Cody ("The Icebreaker Cometh")
- Jay Tapaoan as Larry ("The Icebreaker Cometh")
- Zedrick Restauro as Tad ("The Icebreaker Cometh")
- Lisa Best as Ally ("Zip, Zap, Zop")
- Alexandra Mesmer as Sheila ("Shell of a Man")
- Mackenzie Yeager as Ren Faire Megan ("Shell of a Man")

== Episodes ==
No.	Title	Directed by	Written by	Original release date
1	"The Icebreaker Cometh"	Heath Cullens	Mackenzie Yeager	December 19, 2018
2	"A Prostitute Named Icarus"	Heath Cullens	Heather Flanders	December 19, 2018
3	"Zip, Zap, Zop"	Nancy Hower	Jen Braeden	December 19, 2018
4	"The Gold Trio (Plus One)"	Nancy Hower	Jen Braeden	December 19, 2018
5	"Eggshell"	Ryan Shiraki	Tuckie White & Mackenzie Yeager	December 19, 2018
6	"Shell of a Man"	Heath Cullens	Mackenzie Yeager	December 19, 2018

== Production ==
=== Development ===
On June 25, 2018, it was announced that YouTube had given the production, then titled Kat & June Think Stuff!, a series order for a first season consisting of six episodes. The series was created by Mackenzie Yeager who is also set to write for the series and co-showrun it alongside Jen Braeden. Executive producers for the series are set to include Shelley Zimmerman, Shauna Phelan, Yeager, and Braeden. Production companies involved with the series are expected to include AwesomenessTV. On September 20, 2018, it was announced that the series had been retitled Overthinking with Kat & June and that it would premiere in late-2018. On November 30, 2018, it was announced that the series would premiere on December 19, 2018.

=== Casting ===
Alongside the initial series announcement, it confirmed that Tenea Intriago, Alexia Dox, Emily Hinkler, Elizabeth Hinkler, Sasheer Zamata, and Justin Kirk would star in the series.

=== Filming ===
Principal photography for the series commenced on June 25, 2018, in Los Angeles, California.

== Release ==
On November 30, 2018, the official trailer for the series was released.

== Reception ==
In a positive review, Decider's Josh Sorokach praised the series saying, "Stream it. Absolutely stream it. Overthinking with Kat & June is not only a fresh take on the awkwardness of adult friendship but it’s also a ton of fun. I understand there's no shortage of new content out there, but Overthinking with Kat & June is an absurdly funny comedy not to be missed." In another favorable critique, Metro US' Andrew Husband described the series as "an occasionally surreal blend of laugh-out-loud comedy and absolute cringe. From Kat and June's frequent fantasizing about their older landlord David to the former’s attempts to prepare the latter for a first date with the help of the twins Tessa and Molly, Overthinking can sometimes emphasize the "over" in its title. The thing is, it works so beautifully for this show and the kind of comedy it’s trying to accomplish."
