= The Christmas Setup =

2020 American-Canadian romantic comedy television film

- Main poster
- Genre: Romantic comedy Christmas; LGBTQ
- Written by: Michael J. Murray
- Directed by: Pat Mills
- Starring: Ben Lewis; Blake Lee; Ellen Wong; Fran Drescher; Chad Connell
- Theme music composer: Michael Richard Plowman
- Countries of origin: Canada; United States
- Original language: English

Production
- Editor: Ryan Kovack
- Running time: 85 minutes
- Production companies: MarVista Entertainment; Neshama Entertainment; Wishing Floor Films

Original release
- Network: Lifetime
- Release: December 12, 2020
- Network: CTV Drama Channel
- Release: December 18, 2020

The Christmas Setup is an American-Canadian romantic comedy television film, directed by Pat Mills and broadcast in 2020. The first LGBTQ-themed Christmas film ever broadcast by Lifetime, the film stars Ben Lewis as Hugo, an uptight New York City attorney who comes home with his best friend Madelyn (Ellen Wong) to visit his mother Kate (Fran Drescher) for Christmas, and is forced to consider what he really wants in life when he reconnects with his high school crush Patrick (Blake Lee) just as he is offered a promotion to his firm's office in London.

== Plot ==
Lawyer Hugo Spencer returns home to Milwaukee with best friend Madelyn McKay over Christmas. His mother, Kate Spencer, immediately sets up a list of chores and Christmas activities for her sons, Hugo and Aiden, who returns later that week. While there, Hugo runs into Patrick Ryan, a boy he crushed on in high school. Kate sets Hugo and Patrick, trying to match them up, much to Hugo's embarrassment. Hugo finds out the neighborhood's landmark train station will soon be demolished and rushes to save it. Hugo and Patrick connect and finally have their first kiss under the northern lights.

Hugo receives a call from his boss regarding the senior partner position he had been hoping for. His boss gives him the promotion, on the condition that he relocates to London to open their new office. Hugo takes the opportunity into consideration, distressed by the idea of leaving his home country, family, and Patrick. While at family Christmas trivia game night, Madelyn accidentally tells everyone about Hugo's new job, forcing Hugo to seriously reconsider his decision. Aiden and Maddy become a couple while Hugo finds the paperwork needed to save the train station. At the train station's party, Hugo decides to decline the job and begin a long distance relationship with Patrick.

The movie ends with Kate filming Hugo and Patrick as they kiss outside the train station.

== Cast ==
- Ben Lewis as Hugo Spencer
- Blake Lee as Patrick Ryan
- Ellen Wong as Madelyn McKay
- Fran Drescher as Kate Spencer
- Chad Connell as Aiden Spencer
- Pedro Miguel Arce as Cousin Jimmy Spencer
- Peter Nelson as Frank Ryan
- Glen Grant as George Vogel
- Lucinda Miu as Gladys Klaus

== Production ==
The film was shot in Ottawa and Almonte, Ontario, in 2020.

== Release ==
The film premiered December 12, 2020 on Lifetime in the United States, and December 18, 2020 on CTV Drama Channel in Canada.

== Critical reception ==
The Christmas Setup received positive reviews from critics upon its release. Patrick Serrano of O, The Oprah Magazine wrote "I've watched every made-for-TV movie in 2020. This is the most triumphant." Glamour magazine gave it a positive review with the headline "The Lifetime Gay Christmas Movie Totally Broke Me—So, Yup, It Worked", writing, "exhilarating, freeing, and—if you're a gay man—totally soul-crushing. Isn't that what rom-coms are supposed to do?" In a collective review of 2020's crop of LGBTQ-themed Christmas movies, Salon gave the film a mixed review, calling it cheesy and "derivative of probably 80 straight-to-television holiday movies", but called it "Salon's pick for just straight-up, saccharine Christmas fun. It hits all the marks that have become standard in the straight-to-television holiday movie genre" and praised the casting of real-life couple Lewis and Lee as the romantic leads and expressing relief that "at least none of the issues arise from the central couple". TVLine listed Fran Drescher as an honourable mention in their Performer of the Week, stating, "The most groundbreaking aspect of Lifetime’s first LGBTQ-themed holiday movie The Christmas Setup was not that it had a gay couple at its center. It was that it was actually really good" and "Drescher layered her alter ego’s unabashed glee with notes of genuine happiness. In a sea of indistinguishable, cookie-cutter holiday movie matriarchs, Drescher gifted us with a true Christmas miracle: an actual human being".

=== Accolades ===
The Christmas Setup was nominated for the 2021 GLAAD Media Award for Outstanding TV Movie.

The film received two Canadian Screen Award nominations at the 10th Canadian Screen Awards in 2022, for Best TV Movie and Best Lead Actor in a Television Film or Miniseries (Lewis).
