= Eric Rosen (playwright) =

American playwright (born 1970)

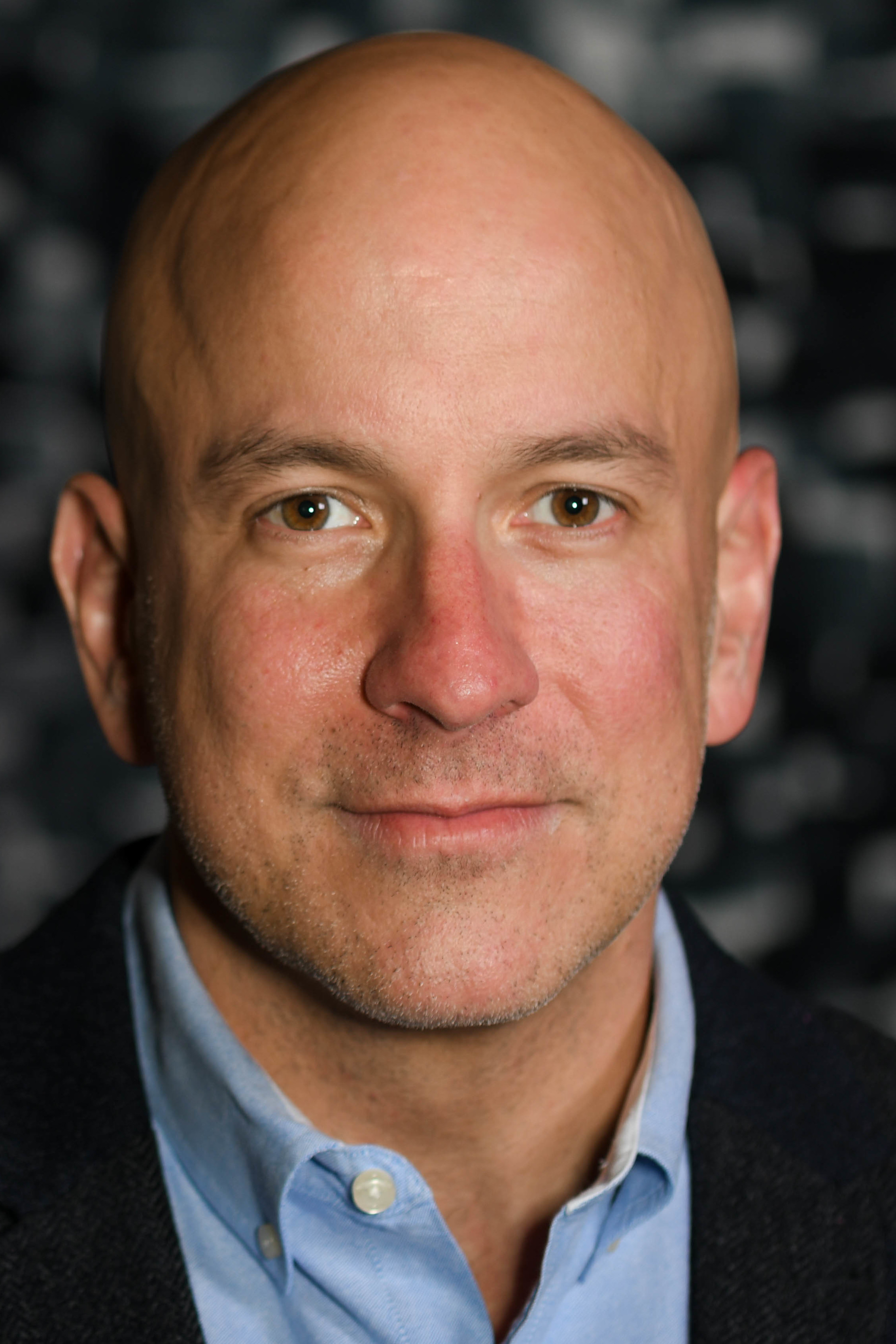
- Rosen in 2017
- Born: September 23, 1970 (age 55); Asheville, North Carolina
- Occupations: Director and Playwright
- Spouse: Claybourne Elder (m. 2012)

Eric Brent Rosen (born September 23, 1970) is an American theater director and playwright.

== Education ==
Rosen attended the University of North Carolina at Chapel Hill, and completed a doctorate of performance studies at Northwestern University.

== Career ==
Eric Rosen co-founded and served as Artistic Director of Chicago's About Face Theatre from 1995-2008. At About Face, Rosen produced the original production of the Pulitzer and Tony Award winning play I Am My Own Wife and Tennessee Williams' One Arm directed by Moisés Kaufman. He went on to serve as Artistic Director of Kansas City Repertory Theatre, bringing national attention to the institution.

He directed the original production of A Christmas Story: The Musical, with music by Benj Pasek and Justin Paul, which opened on Broadway in 2012 and was nominated for a Tony Award for Best Musical. He co-wrote and directed Venice at the Public Theatre in New York which Time magazine named the best musical of 2010. He also directed and co-conceived Clay at Lincoln Center.

He is also known for his reimagining of classic musicals including Sunday in the Park with George which played at the Nelson-Atkins Museum, a punk rock production of Pippin, and Hair: Retrospection in collaboration with and starring members of the original Broadway companies of Hair

As a playwright, his work includes the play Dream Boy which won a Chicago Jeff Award for Best New Play and Best Direction, and the critically acclaimed hip hop musical Venice.

In 2000, he co-founded About Face Youth Theatre, one of the nation's foremost arts and advocacy programs for at-risk LGBTQ youth, and the 18 year old program continues to serve thousands of young people in Chicago.

Rosen serves on the Board of Directors of Theatre Communications Group.

== Directing credits ==
Steppenwolf, Goodman, Hartford Stage, Baltimore Center Stage, St. Louis Rep, Cincinnati Playhouse, Chicago Shakespeare, Melbourne Theatre Company (AUS), the O'Neill, and Sundance.

== Personal life ==
Eric Rosen and actor Claybourne Elder were married on July 28, 2012 in New York State. In 2017 they had a son through surrogacy, whom they named Claybourne.
