= The Carrie Diaries (TV series) =

2013 American teen comedy-drama television series

- Genre: Teen drama; Comedy drama; Period drama
- Based on: The Carrie Diaries by Candace Bushnell
- Developed by: Amy B. Harris
- Starring: AnnaSophia Robb; Austin Butler; Ellen Wong; Katie Findlay; Stefania Owen; Brendan Dooling; Chloe Bridges; Freema Agyeman; Matt Letscher; Lindsey Gort
- Narrated by: AnnaSophia Robb
- Composer: Mark Mothersbaugh
- Country of origin: United States
- Original language: English
- No. of seasons: 2
- No. of episodes: 26 (list of episodes)

Production
- Executive producers: Miguel Arteta; Candace Bushnell; Len Goldstein; Amy B. Harris; Stephanie Savage; Josh Schwartz
- Producer: Jonathan C. Brody
- Running time: 42 minutes
- Production companies: Fake Empire; A.B. Baby Productions; Warner Bros. Television

Original release
- Network: The CW
- Release: January 14, 2013 – January 31, 2014

Related
- Sex and the City; And Just Like That...

The Carrie Diaries is an American teen comedy-drama television series that aired for two seasons on the CW from January 14, 2013, to January 31, 2014. It is a prequel to the HBO television series Sex and the City and based on the 2010 book of the same name by Candace Bushnell.

The first season focuses on Carrie Bradshaw (AnnaSophia Robb) during her junior year of high school in 1984 as she explores life in New York City while interning at a law firm office, and also secretly working at a magazine company, while the second season focuses more on her expanding life in the city as well as the lives of her friends and boyfriend. The Carrie Diaries introduced several inconsistencies with Carrie's backstory established on Sex and the City, and is not considered canon to the earlier series nor And Just Like That.

The pilot was picked up by the CW to a series order of 13 episodes in May 2012. Four months into the first season, the network renewed The Carrie Diaries for a second season, which premiered in October 2013. In May 2014, the CW canceled the series after two seasons.

== Cast and characters ==
=== Main ===
- AnnaSophia Robb as Carrie Bradshaw; The protagonist and voice-over narrator of the series. She is a 16-year-old high school student living in the fictional town of Castlebury, Connecticut, who dreams of being a famous writer. Carrie's mother recently died from cancer and as a result, Carrie's younger sister, Dorrit, is more rebellious than ever, and their father, Tom, is overwhelmed with the responsibility of suddenly having to care for two teenage girls on his own. Instead of attending school on one day during the week, Carrie takes an internship at a law firm in New York City which she relishes as a stepping stone in her quest to leave her small town behind her. She leaves this position to work for Larissa Loughlin at Interview magazine. Towards the end of high school, Larissa offers Carrie a full-time job at the magazine, which she accepts over going to NYU. When Larissa is fired, so is Carrie. She decides to stay in New York, rather than going to Malibu with Sebastian. In the season 2 finale, she moves into Larissa's apartment with Samantha.
- Austin Butler as Sebastian Kydd; The new kid at Castlebury High School and Carrie's love interest. Sebastian moves to Castlebury after getting kicked out of his old high school for having sex with his art history teacher. He lives with his divorced mother who is never around. He and Carrie date during the second half of the first season, before breaking up (after a fight resulting in Sebastian kissing Maggie, Carrie's best friend). They have an unstable, on-and-off relationship, but it is clear that they both have feelings for each other. At the end of season 2, Sebastian moves to Malibu to run his company, leaving the couple apparently broken-up for good.
- Ellen Wong as Jill "Mouse" Chen; Carrie's nerdy and sweet best friend from high school and the ex-girlfriend of a college boy she still loves, and lost her virginity to. They break up because both of their grades were getting low, because they were only focusing on each other. In school, she is an academic overachiever who is said to be under pressure and driven to be the best at everything by her stern parents. Mouse accepts an offer to go to Harvard towards the end of season 2.
- Katie Findlay as Maggie Landers; Carrie's best friend, and Walt's sexually active ex-girlfriend. She is a sarcastic and self-assured underachieving student who barely passes her classes and is said to have an unhappy home life where her parents neglect and ignore her, who are not able to pay for her to go to college. She cares about Carrie, and is willing to sacrifice her own happiness for Carrie's. Maggie is proposed to by Pete in the last episode of season 2, and she accepts.
- Stefania LaVie Owen as Dorrit Bradshaw; Carrie's troubled, 14-year-old, rebellious younger sister. She openly resents Carrie for being close with their mother, and for not having more time with her. She rebels by dyeing her hair and wearing too much eye make-up as well as seeing a boy older than Carrie named Miller.
- Brendan Dooling as Walter "Walt" Reynolds; Carrie's other best friend. He is Maggie's ex-boyfriend, and didn't know that she was cheating on him with a cop. In the ending of the first episode, it's implied that Walt is secretly gay. In later episodes it is clear he is confused about his sexuality, and he sparks an interest in a man named Bennet Wilcox (an employee at Interview Magazine). At the end of the first season he and Maggie break up, and she (as well as the rest of the group) finds out about his homosexuality. In season 2, he begins dating Bennett and his mom sees a picture of them in a local newspaper and kicks him out. He lives at Carrie's for a time before being scared off by the potential to get AIDS, breaking up with Bennett and moving back in with his parents, denying his sexuality again. By the end of season 2, his parents finally accept Walt's homosexuality.
- Chloe Bridges as Donna LaDonna; The school's most popular girl, and the leader of a clique called "The Jens", which is made up of the school's shallow and narcissistic "mean girls". She is Carrie's chief rival in the first season and also has a crush on Walt. When she finds out that Walt was gay, she protects his secret by telling the whole school that they had sex, pretending that they are dating for real. In season 2, she is frenemies with Carrie.
- Freema Agyeman as Larissa Loughlin; a hip, British, cutting-edge style editor at Interview magazine and party girl, who acts as Carrie's mentor in New York City, while she is working at the law firm. It is later revealed that Larissa is an African princess who ran away from her family and found financial support from a British lord before moving to America. Carrie introduces Larissa to Harlan, her father Tom's friend, and Larissa and Harlan get married in the season 2 finale.
- Matt Letscher as Tom Bradshaw; Carrie's overprotective father. He loosens up a bit as the series progresses. When Carrie chooses a job at Interview over going to NYU, Tom disapproves and cuts her off financially. In the season 2 finale, Tom and Carrie mend their relationship when she tells him that she will stay in New York and support herself.
- Lindsey Gort as Samantha Jones (season 2); Donna's brash and outgoing older cousin whom Carrie befriends. She is part of Manhattan's music scene, where she used to work at a bar as a bouncer. Samantha and Carrie move in together at the end of season 2.

=== Recurring ===
- Jake Robinson as Bennet Wilcox, Larissa's co-worker and Walt's former boyfriend. Walt breaks up with him when he realizes that he wants all the things that gay people can't have, after a health scare with AIDS. Towards the end of the second season Walt decides that he cannot live a lie and reconciles with Bennet, realizing that he missed him.
- Josh Salatin as Simon Byrnes, a former local policeman and Maggie's former casual sexual partner. Maggie becomes pregnant with Simon's child but has a miscarriage when she experiences an ectopic pregnancy. He is fired by Maggie's father when he finds out.
- R.J. Brown as Thomas West, Mouse's academic rival and former boyfriend. The two break up after West explains that he is tired of competing with Mouse after she gets accepted to Harvard.
- Scott Cohen as Harlan Silver, Tom's friend who encourages him to begin dating, who is later Larissa's fiance.
- Whitney Vance and Alexandra Miller as the Jens, Donna LaDonna's two minions. They follow her around in explosions of neon doing whatever their leader tells them to.
- Evan Crooks as Miller Miller, Dorrit's former boyfriend who works at a record store.
- Nadia Dajani as Deb, Tom's ex-girlfriend.
- Kate Nowlin as Barbara (season 1; guest season 2), the evil boss at Carrie's internship.
- Chris Wood as Adam Weaver (season 2), a man Carrie meets while trying to get an interview for the magazine, losing her virginity to him, before they break up.

=== Guest ===
- Noelle Beck as Mrs. Kydd, Sebastian's mother.
- Giullian Yao Gioiello as Scott (season 2), Dorrit's friend who later becomes her boyfriend. They meet at the Bradshaw house party. He becomes her boyfriend near the end of season 2 when she is tricked to go to prom with him.

== Production ==
=== Development ===
In September 2011, it was officially announced that the CW was moving forward with a television series as a prequel to the original series, based on The Carrie Diaries. The project is produced by Gossip Girl producers Josh Schwartz and Stephanie Savage. Former Sex and the City writer Amy B. Harris penned the adaptation.

On January 18, 2012, the CW ordered a pilot of The Carrie Diaries. The project was helmed by executive producers Josh Schwartz, Stephanie Savage, Len Goldstein and Candace Bushnell. On May 11, 2012, the pilot was picked up to series. On May 9, 2013, the CW renewed The Carrie Diaries for a second season. It received an order for 13 episodes.

=== Casting ===
On February 15, 2012, the series' first role was cast. Stefania Owen landed the part of Carrie Bradshaw's 14-year-old sister Dorrit. She's described as rebelling in the most obvious of ways: dyeing her hair, getting arrested, acting out. Dorrit is desperate for attention and willing to get it any way she can. On February 27, 2012, it was announced that AnnaSophia Robb had won the role of the young Carrie Bradshaw. On February 28, Katie Findlay and Ellen Wong joined her, Wong to play Carrie's best friend in high school, Jill Chen. Also known as 'The Mouse', Jill is said to be intelligent and loyal. Findlay stars in the project as Carrie's oldest friend Maggie Landers, the police chief's daughter. Whereas Carrie is beginning to explore Manhattan, Maggie has no desire to leave her town. On March 2, 2012, Deadline reported that Austin Butler had been cast as the male lead. Butler plays Sebastian Kydd, a brooding heartthrob and ultimate insider who always plays the outsider. His presence at Carrie's school shakes things up in a big way. On March 4, 2012, Deadline announced that Freema Agyeman had been cast in the pilot as Larissa, a hip, cutting-edge editor and party girl who works at Interview magazine and is Carrie's mentor. On the same day, Brendan Dooling, who originally auditioned for the role of Sebastian, joined the cast as Walt, Carrie's gay friend. On March 9, 2012, Deadline reported that Matt Letscher had been cast as Carrie's father. On March 14, 2012, it was announced that Chloe Bridges had been cast as Carrie's nemesis Donna LaDonna.

On July 20, 2013, E! News reported that actress Lindsey Gort was cast as Samantha Jones for the second season. English model Poppy Delevingne also auditioned for the role.

After the show's cancellation, showrunner Amy B. Harris revealed that had the show been renewed for a third season, Miranda Hobbes would have been introduced as Mouse's roommate at Harvard.

== Episodes ==
Seasons of The Carrie Diaries
| Season | Timeslot (ET) | Episodes | Premiered | | Ended | | Rank | Average viewers (in millions) |
| Season | Timeslot (ET) | Episodes | Date | Premiere viewers (in millions) | Date | Finale viewers (in millions) | Rank | Average viewers (in millions) |
|---|---|---|---|---|---|---|---|---|
| Season 1 | Mondays 8:00 pm | 13 | January 14, 2013 | 1.61 | April 8, 2013 | 1.00 | #143 | 1.14 |
| Season 2 | Fridays 8:00 pm | 13 | October 25, 2013 | 0.78 | January 31, 2014 | 0.86 | #172 | 0.82 |

== Reception ==
=== Critical response ===
The Carrie Diaries has received mixed reviews. Metacritic gave the first season a score of 57% based on 23 reviews, indicating "mixed or average reviews," based on 23 critics. Rotten Tomatoes gave season 1 an approval rating of 66% based on 38 reviews, with an average score of 6.2/10. The site's consensus reads: "AnnaSophia Robb is charming as the lead in The Carrie Diaries, even if this Sex and the City spinoff sometimes suffers from overwrought narration and so-so writing.

Gail Pennington of the St. Louis Post-Dispatch said "The CW's attempt to capture the magic of Sex and the City in a prequel, set in 1984, could have gone very wrong. But The Carrie Diaries is surprisingly right." Marisa LaScala of PopMatters says "The rest of the show goes on to prize sweetness over superficiality." Alan Sepinwall of Hitfix describes "The new series succeeds on its own nostalgic terms."

The second season opened with generally more favorable reviews. Rotten Tomatoes gave it a score of 100%, based on 7 reviews, and praised the introduction of Lindsey Gort as iconic Sex and the City character Samantha Jones.

== Broadcasts ==
In the United States, on its first season, The Carrie Diaries aired on the CW on Mondays at 8:00 pm as a lead-in for 90210 and then streamed on the CW's website. The show moved to Fridays for its second season and it premiered on October 25, having been paired with America's Next Top Model. In Canada, the series airs on Citytv, and premiered January 14, 2013. In Latin America, the series premiered on Boomerang on May 20, 2013.

In Asia-Pacific, The Carrie Diaries started airing in Australia on January 15, 2013, on FOX8. In Malaysia, the series premiered on March 5, 2013, on 8TV, in New Zealand, the show aired on TV2 and in the Philippines, the series premiered on ETC on January 21, 2013. In Bulgaria the series aired for the first time from July 1 to August 5, 2015, on bTV Lady.
