= Greentree Corners, Ohio =

Unincorporated community in Ohio, U.S.

Coordinates: 39°27′45″N 84°16′02″W

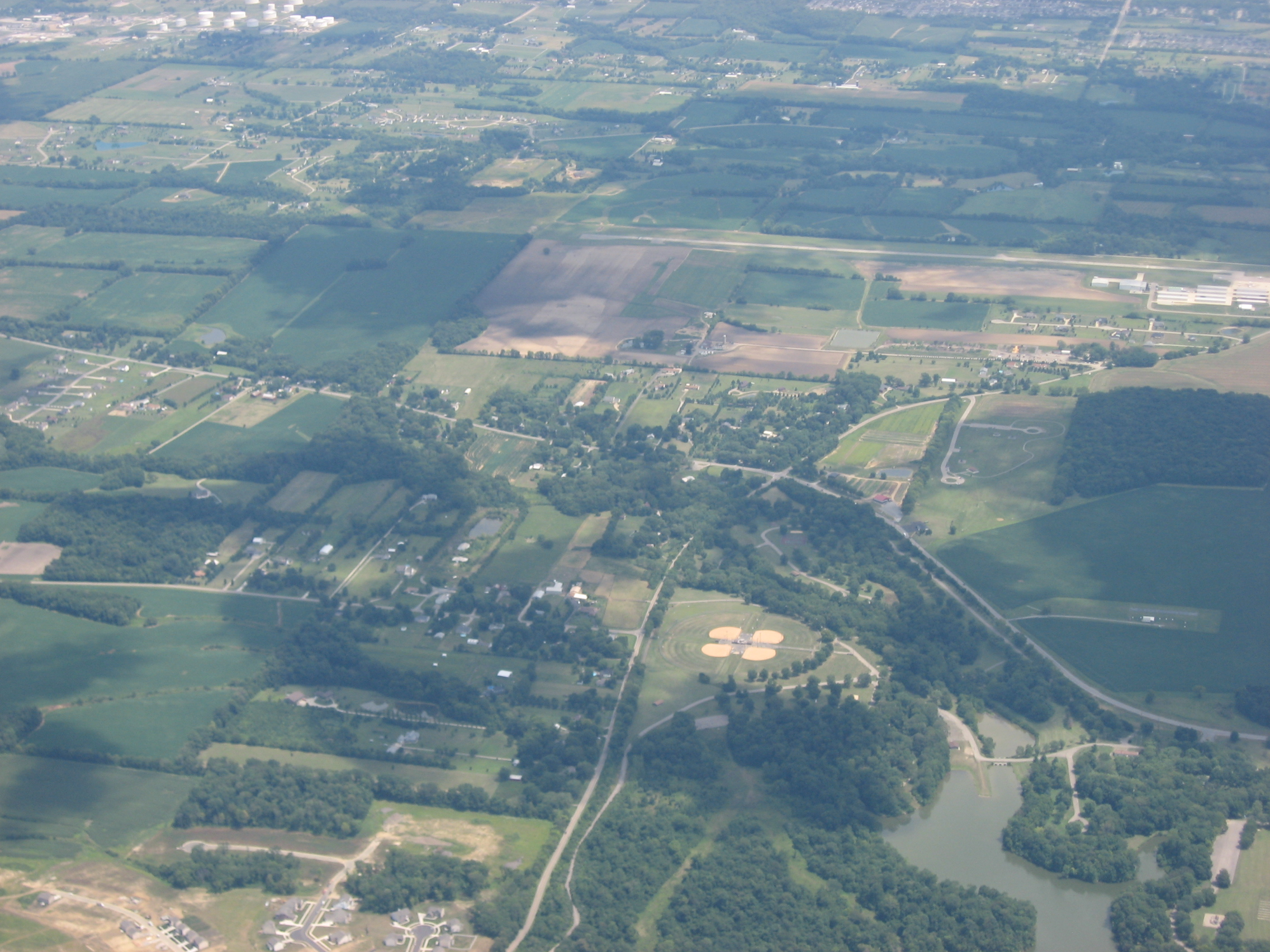
Aerial view of Greentree Corners

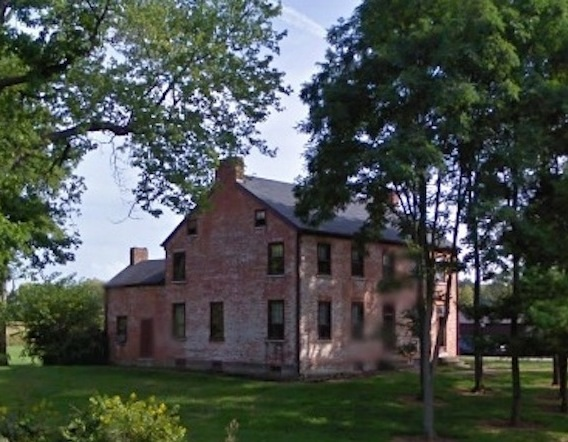
The former Greentree Tavern & Inn

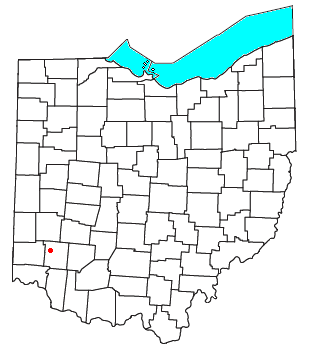
Location of Greentree Corners, Ohio

Greentree Corners (also Green Tree or Greentree Corner) is an unincorporated community in northern Turtlecreek Township, Warren County, Ohio, United States. It is located at the intersection of State Route 741 and Greentree Road about one and one-half miles north of Otterbein, two miles south of Red Lion, and three miles northwest of Lebanon.

Greentree was first named Morristown, and under the latter name laid out in 1816 by one Mr. Morris. The present name is after the Green Tree Tavern (now abandoned).
