= Katie Findlay =

Canadian actor

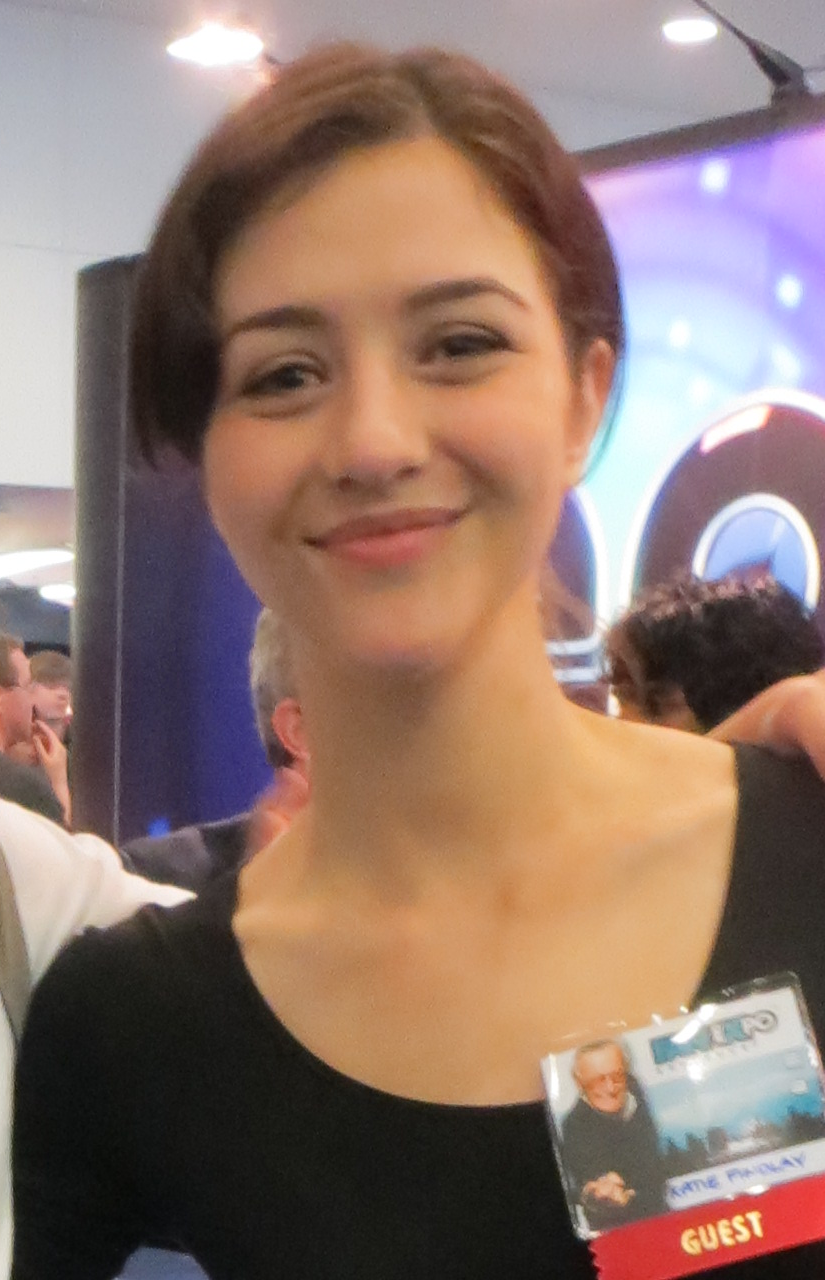
- Findlay at the 2013 Fan Expo Vancouver
- Born: Windsor, Ontario, Canada
- Occupation: Actor
- Years active: 2010–present

Katie Findlay is a Canadian actor known for portraying Rosie Larsen in the American crime drama television series The Killing. From 2013 to 2014, Findlay portrayed Maggie Landers in the CW's teen drama The Carrie Diaries. From 2014 to 2015, Findlay starred as Rebecca Sutter in the first two seasons of the ABC series How to Get Away with Murder. In 2017, they joined the cast of FXX comedy series Man Seeking Woman in the show's third season.

== Career ==
After appearing in two CBC pilots, Findlay was cast in the Fox sci-fi series Fringe. They then played Emily in the television film Tangled, and Rosie Larsen, the titular murder victim, in the AMC television series The Killing. They have appeared on several television series including Endgame, Continuum and Stargate Universe. On February 27, 2012, Findlay was cast as Maggie Landers on The CW's teen drama series The Carrie Diaries, a prequel to Sex and the City. In 2012, they landed the role of Bonnie in the science fiction film After the Dark.

In March 2014, Findlay was cast as Rebecca Sutter in Shonda Rhimes' ABC legal drama series How to Get Away with Murder. The same year they were cast in the lead role in the psychological thriller film, The Dark Stranger. In the fourth quarter of 2015, Findlay was cast as the role of Molly Callens in a new Hallmark Channel Christmas two-part movie, The Bridge, based on the novel by Karen Kingsbury; the first part aired on December 6, 2015.

In 2016, Findlay was cast in the third season of the FXX comedy series Man Seeking Woman, as the new love interest of Josh (Jay Baruchel).

== Personal life ==
Findlay is queer and genderfluid and uses they/them pronouns.

== Filmography ==
Katie Findlay film appearances
| Year | Title | Role | Notes |
|---|---|---|---|
| 2011 | Crash Site: A Family in Danger | Frances Saunders | |
| 2013 | After the Dark | Bonnie | |
| 2014 | Premature | Gabrielle | |
| 2015 | The Dark Stranger | Leah Garrison | |
| 2015 | Jem and the Holograms | Mary "Stormer" Phillips | |
| 2019 | Straight Up | Rory | |
| 2025 | Twinless | Lori | |

Katie Findlay television appearances
| Year | Title | Role | Notes |
|---|---|---|---|
| 2010 | Tangled | Emily | Television film |
| 2010 | Fringe | Jill Redmond | Episode: "The Man from the Other Side" |
| 2010 | Psych | Minka | Episode: "Shawn 2.0" |
| 2011–2012 | The Killing | Rosie Larsen | Recurring role |
| 2011 | Endgame | Maisie MacDonald | Episode: "The Other Side of Summer" |
| 2011 | Stargate Universe | Ellie | 2 episodes |
| 2012 | Continuum | Lily Jones | Episode: "A Test of Time" |
| 2013–2014 | The Carrie Diaries | Maggie Landers | Main role |
| 2014–2015 | How to Get Away with Murder | Rebecca Sutter | Main role (season 1); guest role (season 2) |
| 2015 | Karen Kingsbury's The Bridge (Part 1) | Molly Callens | Television film |
| 2016 | Karen Kingsbury's The Bridge (Part 2) | Molly Callens | Television film |
| 2016 | The Magicians | Eve | 3 episodes |
| 2017 | Man Seeking Woman | Lucy | Main role (season 3) |
| 2017 | Lost Generation | Cooper | Main role |
| 2019 | The Twilight Zone | Air Hostess | Episode: "Nightmare at 30,000 Feet" |
| 2019 | Heart of Life | Sydney Winter | Television film |
| 2019 | Search and Destroy | Autumn Simpson | Television film |
| 2019–2021 | Nancy Drew | Lisbeth | Recurring role |
| 2021 | Zoey's Extraordinary Playlist | Rose | Recurring role |
| 2021 | Love Strikes Twice | Maggie | Television film |
| 2021 | Psych 3: This Is Gus | Brin | Television film |
| 2022 | Walker: Independence | Kate | Main role |
| 2023 | Sealed With a List | Carley | Television film |
| 2024 | Fire Country | Francine | 4 episodes |
| 2024 | The 5 Year Christmas Party | Alice | Television film |
| 2025 | Wild Cards | Maddy | Guest role (season 2) |
| 2025 | Murder in a Small Town | Parker Lamont | Episode: "One Last Song" |
