= Ellen Wong =

Canadian actress

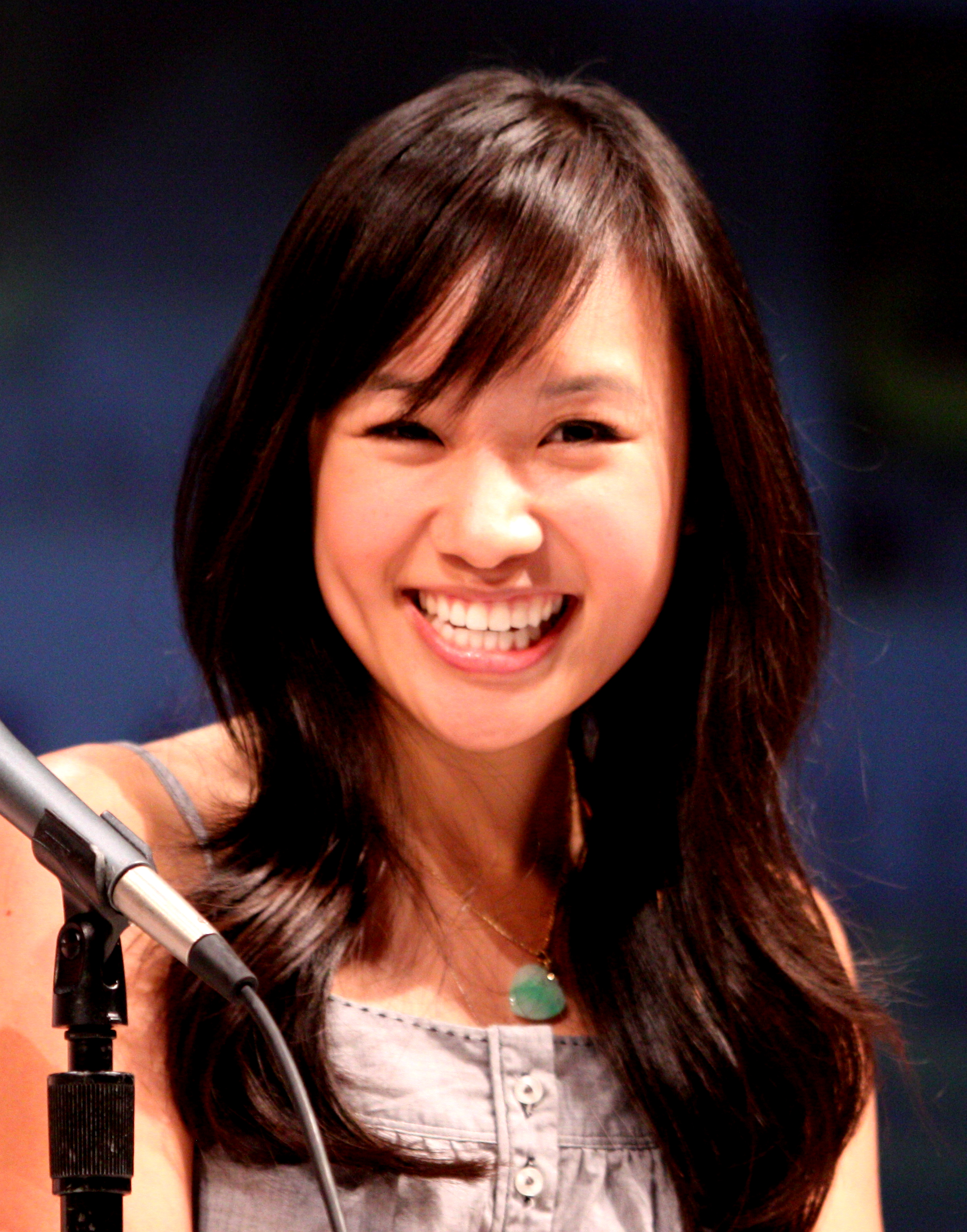
- Wong in 2024
- Born: Scarborough, Ontario, Canada
- Occupation: Actress
- Years active: 2005–present

Ellen Wong
- Traditional Chinese: 愛倫·王
- Simplified Chinese: 爱伦・王
Transcriptions
Standard Mandarin
- Hanyu Pinyin: Ài lún · Wáng
- Wade–Giles: Ai^{4}lun^{2} Wang^{2}

Ellen Wong is a Canadian actress. She portrayed Knives Chau in the film Scott Pilgrim vs. the World and the animated Netflix series Scott Pilgrim Takes Off, Jill "Mouse" Chen in The CW's series The Carrie Diaries, Jenny Chey in the Netflix series GLOW, and Hope in the film In the Life of Music.

== Early life ==
Wong was born in Scarborough, Ontario in 1985 to Teochew-speaking Chinese-Cambodian parents who fled to Canada during the Cambodian genocide. She began acting in community theatre while attending L'Amoreaux Collegiate Institute and worked in a variety of television production jobs from the age of 14. She later studied radio and television arts at Ryerson University (now Toronto Metropolitan University).

== Career ==
Wong continued acting while at university, and in 2005, she landed a role in the television series This Is Wonderland followed by Runaway in 2006. She also has a black belt in taekwondo, but had to stop sparring competitively due to her acting schedule. Wong's martial arts background helped her land the role of Knives Chau in Scott Pilgrim vs. the World in January 2009. She auditioned for the part three times. On her second audition director Edgar Wright was surprised to find out that she studied taekwondo and was intrigued by this "sweetfaced young lady being a secret badass". Wong expressed that the role of Knives Chau caught her eye because "it's not every day that as an Asian female, you get to be able to read a role that's empowering, that has a great arc, and that's so integral to the story as a whole".

Wong also appeared in the television show Unnatural History. In 2011, she had a recurring role as Nurse Suzy Chao in the Global/ABC series Combat Hospital. In January 2012, she was nominated for an ACTRA Award for Outstanding Performance by a Female for her work portraying an illegal immigrant smuggled across the ocean in a shipping container in the short film Silent Cargo. In February 2012, Wong was cast in the Sex and the City prequel series The Carrie Diaries, playing Jill "Mouse" Chen, Carrie's best friend from high school who is described as "pragmatic, bright, and super loyal". In 2012 she also starred in Silent Night, a loose remake of the 1984 horror film Silent Night, Deadly Night.

In June 2016, Wong was cast in the second season of the Syfy series Dark Matter, and in October, she was cast in the Netflix comedy series GLOW, which was inspired by the 1980s female professional wrestling league of the same name. In the series, Wong plays Jenny, an immigrant from Cambodia who is obsessed with pop culture. Wong was initially dismayed to find out the character's wrestling persona was named "Fortune Cookie" but stated, "What is really awesome about GLOW is that we play these two characters. In the ring, you are these stereotypes. But then you see who these characters are in real life outside of the ring and how they feel... Jenny is trying to be this all-American girl in the '80s, and she's basically trying to fight all these stereotypes and at the same time here she is playing this stereotype." The creators of the series wrote the character's background as Cambodian after several meetings with Wong.

In 2017, Wong appeared in the thriller film The Circle, starring Emma Watson and Tom Hanks, and in Katy Perry's music video for "Swish Swish" as her character from GLOW. That August, Wong joined the Audience television network series, Condor, in a recurring role.

In 2018, Wong starred in In the Life of Music with Arn Chorn-Pond, portraying a character who travels to Cambodia to visit her aunt in place of her mother, who was unable to go due to lingering trauma from the post–Cambodian Civil War takeover by the Khmer Rouge.

In December 2019, Wong joined the cast of the Michael Caine and Aubrey Plaza comedy Best Sellers.

In 2020, she appeared in the Christmas television film The Christmas Setup.

== Filmography ==
Film
Year	Title	Role	Notes
2010	Scott Pilgrim vs. the World	Knives Chau	
2011	Silent Cargo	Daiyu	Short film
2012	Silent Night	Brenda	
2016	The Void	Kim	
2017	The Circle	Renata	
2018	In the Life of Music	Hope	
2021	Best Sellers	Rachel Spence	
2026	Mike & Nick & Nick & Alice	Trudy	

Television
Year	Title	Role	Notes
2005	This Is Wonderland	Amy Li	Season 2, episode 5
2006	Runaway	Macy	Episode: "End Game"
2010	Unnatural History	Hoshi	Episode: "Heart of a Warrior"
2011	Combat Hospital	Major Suzy Chao	12 episodes
2013–2014	The Carrie Diaries	Jill "Mouse" Chen	Main cast; 26 episodes
2015	Castle	Zhu Yin	Episode: "Hong Kong Hustle"
2016–2017	Dark Matter	Misaki Han-Shireikan	Season 2 & 3
2016	Son of Zorn	Nancy	Episode: "Return to Orange County"
2017–2019	GLOW	Jenny Chey	Recurring role
2018	Condor	Sarah Tan	Recurring role
2020	The Christmas Setup	Madelyn McKay	TV movie
2023	Scott Pilgrim Takes Off	Knives Chau	Voice role
2024	Beacon 23	Iris "B67"	Season 2, 5 episodes (bilingual English/Teochew character)

== Awards and nominations ==
Year	Award	Category	Work	Result	Ref.
2011	Scream Awards	Best Supporting Actress	Scott Pilgrim vs. the World	Nominated	
2012	ACTRA Awards	Outstanding Performance by a Female	Silent Cargo	Nominated	
