= Evan Crooks =

American actor

- Born: Fresno County, California, U.S.
- Occupation: Actor

Evan Crooks is an American actor who was born in Fresno County, California.

== Career ==
Crooks is best known for his performances in A Halloween Puppy (2012), Raised by Wolves (2014), as Theo in the TV series Awkward (2011), and as Miller in The Carrie Diaries. One of his first roles was in a short film called North Blvd, which he reprised years later for a feature film version. He has been featured in commercials for Taco Bell and Coca-Cola, and in print, he has worked with brands including Abercrombie & Fitch, Pottery Barn, Sony and EA Sports.

== Filmography ==
=== Film ===
Year	Title	Role	Notes
2014	Raised by Wolves	Mikey	
2017	Fun Mom Dinner	Dylan	
2018	North Blvd	Young Seth	

=== Television ===
Year	Title	Role	Notes
2012	The Great Halloween Puppy Adventure	Adam	Television film
2013	Grey's Anatomy	Will	Episode: "Two Against One"
2013	The Carrie Diaries	Miller	6 episodes
2014	Instant Mom	Kyle Ebnetter	Episode: "An Egg by Any Other Name"
2014–2015	Awkward	Theo Abbott	21 episodes
2015	Casual	Emile	5 episodes
2015	The Bluffs	Brandon	Episode: "Pilot"
2016	On Hiatus with Monty Geer	Devin / Devan	2 episodes
2018	Heathers	Jacob	Episode: "Pilot"
