= Brendan Dooling =

American actor

- Born: January 27, 1990 (age 36)
- Occupation: Actor
- Years active: 2010–2023

Brendan Dooling (born January 27, 1990) is an American actor. He is known for his portrayal of Walt Reynolds on The CW's teen drama series The Carrie Diaries.

== Personal life ==
Dooling took acting classes at the Gateway Acting School in Bellport, New York. He resides in Brooklyn, New York City, and enjoys ultimate frisbee.

== Filmography ==
Film
| Year | Title | Role | Notes |
|---|---|---|---|
| 2012 | Somewhere Road | Wyle | Short film |
| 2013 | Breathe In | Ryan | |
| 2013 | Paranoia | Dylan Goddard | |
| 2015 | Charlie, Trevor and a Girl Savannah | June Bug | |
| 2015 | Demolition | Todd Koehler | |
| 2016 | Loserville | Richie Covington | |
| 2018 | No Alternative | Jim Roberts | |
| 2023 | Ballad of a Hustler | Sam | |

Television
| Year | Title | Role | Notes |
|---|---|---|---|
| 2010 | An Elf's Story: The Elf on the Shelf | Chippy | Voice, lead role; television film |
| 2012 | Chuggington | Skylar | Voice, English version; 4 episodes |
| 2012 | Unforgettable | Frat Boy #2 | Episode: "Brotherhood" |
| 2013–2014 | The Carrie Diaries | Walter "Walt" Reynolds | Main cast; 22 episodes |
| 2016 | Chicago P.D. | Scott "Scoot" Fitzgerald | Episode: "A War Zone" |
| 2017 | Bull | Troy Dickerson | 2 episodes |
| 2017 | Gone | Dylan Bender | Episode: "Ride" |
