= Amy B. Harris =

American producer and writer for television and film

- Born: 1970 or 1971; Bethesda, Maryland, U.S.
- Education: Duke University
- Occupations: Producer; screenwriter
- Years active: 1998–present
- Spouse: Jason Reilly (m. 2009)
- Children: 1

Amy B. Harris (born 1970/71), sometimes credited as Amy Harris, is an American screenwriter and producer. She is best known for producing the HBO series Sex and the City (1998–2004) and developing its prequel series The Carrie Diaries (2013–14), which aired on The CW.

== Career ==
Harris first considered a legal career, but instead worked for a year as an editorial assistant at Vanity Fair before moving to CBS to work on their TV series Central Park West. Although the show was not successful, when it folded she had the opportunity to join HBO.

Harris was a co-producer for the HBO romantic sitcom Sex and the City, for which she wrote two episodes: "Ring A Ding Ding" and "Hop, Skip and a Week". In 2005, she was producer for the HBO comedy-drama series The Comeback, and wrote the episode "Valerie Gets a Magazine Cover". She was one of the writers and co-executive producers for the second season of the series, which first aired nine years after the debut season, in November 2014.

Harris co-wrote the 2006 romantic comedy film Just My Luck. She was executive producer of the 2008 web series Puppy Love, and short films Gone to the Dogs (2008) and Whose Dog is it Anyway? (2009). She also wrote the series Fetching for AOL's On Network in 2012.

Harris was consulting producer for teen drama Gossip Girl (2007–12) and wrote the episodes "Memoirs of an Invisible Dan" and "Cross Rhodes". From 2013 until its cancellation in 2014, Harris served as executive producer of Sex and the City's prequel series The Carrie Diaries. Harris developed the project at The CW and wrote several episodes including "Win Some, Lose Some".

In 2015, Harris signed a two-year deal with ABC Studios to develop new projects for the network and its streaming services. She was named showrunner and executive producer for ABC Network's crime anthology series Wicked City. This aired in 2015 but was pulled after three episodes, although the remaining five episodes were made available on Hulu later that year. She was originally showrunner and executive producer for ABC's 2016 series Designated Survivor but left when the creative direction of the series changed. Her association with ABC continued, and was further renewed for two years in 2019. According to Jonnie Davis, the president of ABC Studios: "There are very few writers who capture the voice of women like Amy can".

Harris was showrunner and an executive producer for Amazon Prime Video's The Wilds, which was cancelled after two seasons, and later for Every Year After, which was released in 2026.

== Personal life ==
Harris was raised in Bethesda, Maryland, the daughter of lawyers Susan Banes Harris and former FCC bureau head Laurence E. Harris (1936–2020). She attended Bullis School in Potomac, Maryland and graduated from Duke University, where she majored in Russian and political science. She married television director Jason Reilly in 2009. They have one daughter.
