= Primetime Emmy Award for Outstanding Movie =

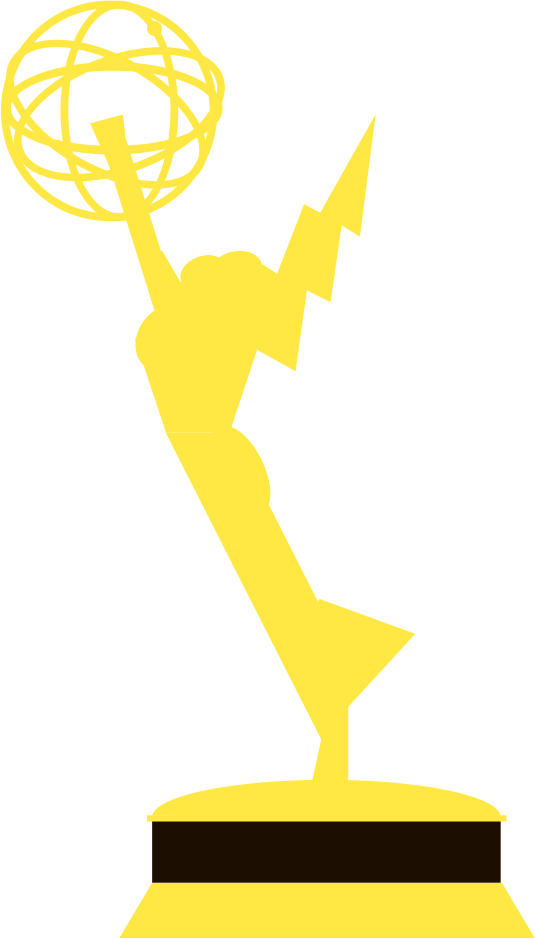
- Awarded for: Television films
- Country: United States
- Presented by: Academy of Television Arts & Sciences
- First award: 1966
- Currently held by: Remarkably Bright Creatures (2026)
- Website: emmys.com

The Primetime Emmy Award for Outstanding Movie (formerly known as Outstanding Drama or Comedy Special and Outstanding Television Movie) is an award given to made-for-television films that was first presented in 1966, and originally awarded single episodes of series alongside television movies.

In 1991, Outstanding Drama or Comedy Special category was merged with Outstanding Miniseries category to form Outstanding Drama or Comedy Special and Miniseries and featured six nominations. For that year, two miniseries competed with four made-for-television movies. However, in 1992, the category was separated and the Outstanding Miniseries and Outstanding Made for Television Movie categories were restored.

In 2011, the category was merged with the Outstanding Miniseries category to create the Outstanding Miniseries or Movie category. However, in 2014, the merged category was reversed, and the separate Miniseries and Television Movie categories were reinstated. Rules were also changed in 2019, requiring at least a 75-minute runtime for movies to be eligible.

In the history of this category, there have been four incidents of ties. The first occurred in 1976, when Eleanor and Franklin: The White House Years tied with Sybil, the second occurred in 1989, when Day One tied with Roe vs. Wade, the third occurred in 1990, when Caroline? tied with The Incident, and the fourth occurred in 1993, when Barbarians at the Gate tied with Stalin.

== Anthology series ==
In the 1950s and 1960s, anthology series were typically nominated in Drama Series categories. A resurgence of anthology series such as Black Mirror led individual episodes to be nominated for Outstanding Television Movie. Black Mirror won in 2017 with "San Junipero" and in 2018 with "USS Callister". In 2018, rule changes restricted the category to runtimes of at least 75 minutes. Black Mirror won again in 2019 with the interactive film Bandersnatch, which has a variable runtime, nominally 90 minutes. Netflix petitioned for "Smithereens" to be submitted in the category in 2020, despite a 70-minute runtime. This was initially allowed, but it was later entered as Outstanding Drama Series instead.

Critics for IndieWire disagreed with ATAS's decisions that Black Mirror fell within the Television Movie scope, as it is episodic. Variety's Michael Schneider noted that it was unclear where else the fifth series could have been nominated due to Drama Series and Limited Series requirements. In 2021, the Limited Series category was renamed Limited or Anthology Series.

== Winners and nominations ==
=== 1960s ===
Year	Program	Producers	Network
1966 (18th) (Note: From 1966 to 1970, television movies and single episodes of series were eligible to compete in a combined category for Outstanding Dramatic Program.)
1966 (18th)	Ages of Man	Daniel Melnick and David Susskind, producers	CBS
1966 (18th)	Eagle in a Cage	George Schaefer, producer	NBC
1966 (18th)	Inherit the Wind	George Schaefer, producer	NBC
1966 (18th)	Slattery's People: "Rally 'Round Your Own Flag, Mister"	Irving Elman, producer	CBS
1967 (19th)
1967 (19th)	Death of a Salesman	Daniel Melnick and David Susskind, producers	CBS
1967 (19th)	A Christmas Memory	Frank Perry, producer	ABC
1967 (19th)	The Final War of Olly Winter	Fred Coe, producer	CBS
1967 (19th)	The Love Song of Barney Kempinski	Marc Merson, producer	ABC
1967 (19th)	Mark Twain Tonight!	David Susskind, producer	CBS
1968 (20th)
1968 (20th)	Elizabeth the Queen	George Schaefer, producer	NBC
1968 (20th)	Dear Friends	Herbert Brodkin, producer	CBS
1968 (20th)	Do Not Go Gentle Into That Good Night	George Schaefer, producer	NBC
1968 (20th)	Luther	Michael Style and Trevor Wallace, producers	ABC
1968 (20th)	The Strange Case of Dr. Jekyll and Mr. Hyde	Dan Curtis, producer	ABC
1968 (20th)	Uncle Vanya	Laurence Olivier, producer	NET
1969 (21st)
1969 (21st)	Teacher, Teacher	George Lefferts, producer	NBC
1969 (21st)	Heidi	Frederick H. Brogger and James Franciscus, producers	NBC
1969 (21st)	A Midsummer Night's Dream	Lord Michael Birkett, producer	CBS
1969 (21st)	Mission: Impossible: "The Execution"	Allan Balter and William Read Woodfield, producers	CBS
1969 (21st)	The People Next Door	Herbert Brodkin, producer	CBS
1969 (21st)	Talking to a Stranger	Michael Bakewell, producer	NET

=== 1970s ===
Year	Program	Producers	Network
Outstanding Dramatic Program
1970 (22nd)
1970 (22nd)	A Storm in Summer	M.J. Rivkin, executive producer; Alan Landsburg, producer	NBC
1970 (22nd)	David Copperfield	Frederick Brogger, producer	NBC
1970 (22nd)	Marcus Welby, M.D.: "Hello, Goodbye, Hello"	David Victor, executive producer; David J. O'Connell, producer	ABC
1970 (22nd)	My Sweet Charlie	Bob Banner, executive producer; Richard Levinson and William Link, producers	NBC
Outstanding Single Program - Drama or Comedy
1971 (23rd) (Note: In 1971 and 1972, television movies and single episodes of series competed in a combined category for Outstanding Single Program - Drama or Comedy.)
1971 (23rd)	The Andersonville Trial	Lewis Freedman, producer	PBS
1971 (23rd)	Hamlet	Cecil Clarke and George LeMaire, producers	NBC
1971 (23rd)	Night Gallery: "They're Tearing Down Tim Riley's Bar"	Jack Laird, producer	NBC
1971 (23rd)	The Price	David Susskind, producer	NBC
1971 (23rd)	Vanished	David J. O'Connell and David Victor, producers	NBC
1972 (24th)
1972 (24th)	Brian's Song	Paul Junger Witt, producer	ABC
1972 (24th)	All in the Family: "Sammy's Visit"	Norman Lear, producer	CBS
1972 (24th)	Elizabeth R: "The Lion's Club"	Roderick Graham and Christopher Sarson, producers	PBS
1972 (24th)	The Six Wives of Henry VIII: "Jane Seymour"	Mark Shivas and Ronald Travers, producers	CBS
1972 (24th)	The Snow Goose	Frank O'Connor, producer	NBC
1973 (25th)
1973 (25th)	A War of Children	Roger Gimbel, executive producer; George Schaefer, producer	CBS
1973 (25th)	Long Day's Journey into Night	Cecil Clarke, executive producer	ABC
1973 (25th)	The Marcus-Nelson Murders	Abby Mann, executive producer; Matthew Rapf, producer	CBS
1973 (25th)	The Red Pony	Frederick H. Brogger, producer	NBC
1973 (25th)	That Certain Summer	Richard Levinson and William Link, producer	ABC
Outstanding Special-Comedy or Drama
1974 (26th)
1974 (26th)	The Autobiography of Miss Jane Pittman	Robert W. Christiansen and Rick Rosenberg, producers	CBS
1974 (26th)	The Execution of Private Slovik	Richard Levinson and William Link, executive producers; Richard Dubelman, producer	NBC
1974 (26th)	The Migrants	Tom Gries, producer	CBS
1974 (26th)	6 Rms Riv Vu	Joe Hamilton, producer	CBS
1974 (26th)	Steambath	Norman Lloyd, executive producer	PBS
Outstanding Special - Drama or Comedy
1975 (27th)
1975 (27th)	The Law	William Sackheim, producer	NBC
1975 (27th)	Love Among the Ruins	Allan Davis, producer	ABC
1975 (27th)	The Missiles of October	Irv Wilson, executive producer; Herbert Brodkin and Robert Berger, producers	ABC
1975 (27th)	QB VII	Douglas S. Cramer, producer	ABC
1975 (27th)	Queen of the Stardust Ballroom	Robert Christiansen and Rick Rosenberg, producers	CBS
1976 (28th)
1976 (28th)	Eleanor and Franklin	David Susskind, executive producer; Harry R. Sherman and Audrey Maas, producers	ABC
1976 (28th)	Babe	Norman Felton and Stanley Rubin, producers	CBS
1976 (28th)	Fear on Trial	Alan Landsburg and Laurence D. Savadove, executive producers; Stanley Chase, producers	NBC
1976 (28th)	The Lindbergh Kidnapping Case	David Gerber, executive producer; Buzz Kulik, producer	CBS
1976 (28th)	A Moon for the Misbegotten	David Susskind and Audrey Maas, producers	CBS
1977 (29th)
1977 (29th)	Eleanor and Franklin: The White House Years	David Susskind, executive producer; Harry R. Sherman, producer	ABC
1977 (29th)	Sybil	Peter Dunne and Philip Capice, executive producers; Jacqueline Babbin, producer	NBC
1977 (29th)	Harry S Truman: Plain Speaking	David Susskind, producer	PBS
1977 (29th)	Raid on Entebbe	Edgar J. Scherick and Daniel H. Blatt, executive producers	NBC
1977 (29th)	21 Hours at Munich	Edward S. Feldman, executive producer; Frank von Zerneck and Robert Greenwald, producers	ABC
1978 (30th)
1978 (30th)	The Gathering	Joseph Barbera, executive producer; Harry R. Sherman, producer	ABC
1978 (30th)	A Death in Canaan	Robert W. Christiansen and Rick Rosenberg, producers	CBS
1978 (30th)	Jesus of Nazareth	Bernard J. Kingham, executive producer; Vincenzo Labella, producer	NBC
1978 (30th)	Our Town	Saul Jaffe, executive producer; George Schaefer, producer	NBC
1978 (30th)	Young Joe, the Forgotten Kennedy	Bill McCutchen, producer	ABC
Outstanding Drama or Comedy Special
1979 (31st)
1979 (31st)	Friendly Fire	Martin Starger, executive producer; Philip Barry Jr., producer; Fay Kanin, co-producer	ABC
1979 (31st)	Dummy	Frank Konigsberg, executive producer; Sam Manners and Ernest Tidyman, producers	CBS
1979 (31st)	First, You Cry	Philip Barry Jr., producer	CBS
1979 (31st)	The Jericho Mile	Tim Zinnemann, producer	ABC
1979 (31st)	Summer of My German Soldier	Linda Gottlieb, producer	NBC

=== 1980s ===
Year	Program	Producers	Network
Outstanding Drama or Comedy Special
1980 (32nd)
1980 (32nd)	The Miracle Worker	Raymond Katz and Sandy Gallin, executive producers; Fred Coe, producer	NBC
1980 (32nd)	All Quiet on the Western Front	Martin Starger, executive producer; Norman Rosemont, producer	CBS
1980 (32nd)	Amber Waves	Philip Mandelker, executive producer; Stanley Kallis, producer	ABC
1980 (32nd)	Gideon's Trumpet	John Houseman, executive producer; David W. Rintels, producer	CBS
1980 (32nd)	Guyana Tragedy: The Story of Jim Jones	Frank Konigsberg, executive producer; Ernest Tidyman and Sam Manners, producers	CBS
Outstanding Drama Special
1981 (33rd)
1981 (33rd)	Playing for Time	Linda Yellen, executive producer; John E. Quill, co-producer	CBS
1981 (33rd)	Evita Peron	Harry Sloan, Lawrence Kuppin and Selma Jaffe, executive producers; Fred Baum, supervising producer; Marvin J. Chomsky, producer; David R. Ames, co-producer	NBC
1981 (33rd)	Fallen Angel	Jim Green and Allen S. Epstein, executive producers; Lew Hunter and Audrey A. Blasdel, executive producers	CBS
1981 (33rd)	The Shadow Box	Jill Marti and Susan Kendall Newman, producers	ABC
1981 (33rd)	The Women's Room	Philip Mandelker, executive producer; Glenn Jordan, supervising producer; Kip Gowans and Anna Cottle, producers	ABC
1982 (34th)
1982 (34th)	A Woman Called Golda	Harve Bennett, executive producer; Gene Corman, producer	Syndicated
1982 (34th)	Bill	Alan Landsburg, executive producer; Mel Stuart, producer	CBS
1982 (34th)	The Elephant Man	Martin Starger, executive producer; Richmond Crinkley, producer	ABC
1982 (34th)	Inside the Third Reich	E. Jack Neuman, producer	ABC
1982 (34th)	Skokie	Herbert Brodkin, executive producer; Robert Berger, producer	CBS
1983 (35th)
1983 (35th)	Special Bulletin	Don Ohlmeyer, executive producer; Marshall Herskovitz and Edward Zwick, producers	NBC
1983 (35th)	Little Gloria... Happy at Last	Scott Rudin and Edgar J. Scherick, executive producers; Justine Héroux and David Nicksay, producers	NBC
1983 (35th)	M.A.D.D.: Mothers Against Drunk Drivers	David Moessinger, executive producer; Douglas Benton, supervising producer; Michael Braverman, producer	NBC
1983 (35th)	The Scarlet Pimpernel	Mark Shelmerdine, executive producer; David Conroy, producer	CBS
1983 (35th)	Who Will Love My Children?	Paula Levenback and Wendy Riche, producers	ABC
Outstanding Drama/Comedy Special
1984 (36th)
1984 (36th)	Something About Amelia	Leonard Goldberg, executive producer; Michele Rappaport, producer	ABC
1984 (36th)	Adam	Alan Landsburg and Joan Barnett, executive producers; Linda Otto, producer	NBC
1984 (36th)	The Day After	Robert Papazian, producer	ABC
1984 (36th)	The Dollmaker	Bruce Gilbert, executive producer; Bill Finnegan, producer	ABC
1984 (36th)	A Streetcar Named Desire	Keith Barish and Craig Baumgarten, executive producers; Marc Trabulus, producer	ABC
1985 (37th)
1985 (37th)	Do You Remember Love	Dave Bell, executive producer; Marilyn Hall, co-executive producer; Wayne Threm and James Thompson, producers; Walter Halsey Davis, co-producer	CBS
1985 (37th)	The Burning Bed	Jon Avnet and Steve Tisch, executive producers; Carol Schreder, producer; Rose Leiman Goldemberg, co-producer	NBC
1985 (37th)	Fatal Vision	Mike Rosenfeld and Dan Wigutow, executive producers; Richard L. O'Connor, producer	NBC
1985 (37th)	Heartsounds	Norman Lear, executive producer; Fay Kanin and Fern Field, producers	ABC
1985 (37th)	Wallenberg: A Hero's Story	Richard Berg, executive producer; Richard Irving, producer; Lamont Johnson and Phillip Levitan, co-producers	NBC
1986 (38th)
1986 (38th)	Love Is Never Silent	Marian Rees, executive producer; Julianna Field, co-executive producer; Dorothea G. Petrie, producer	NBC
1986 (38th)	Amos	Peter Douglas, executive producer; Bill Finnegan and Sheldon Pinchuk, producers	CBS
1986 (38th)	Death of a Salesman	Arthur Miller and Dustin Hoffman, executive producers; Robert F. Colesberry, producer	CBS
1986 (38th)	An Early Frost	Perry Lafferty, producer; Art Seidel, co-producer	NBC
1986 (38th)	Mrs. Delafield Wants to Marry	Merrill H. Karpf, executive producer; George Schaefer, producer; James Prideaux, co-producer	CBS
1987 (39th)
1987 (39th)	Promise	Peter K. Duchow and James Garner, executive producers; Glenn Jordan, producer; Richard Friedenberg, co-producer	CBS
1987 (39th)	Escape from Sobibor	Martin Starger, executive producer; Dennis E. Doty, producer; Howard P. Alston, co-producer	CBS
1987 (39th)	LBJ: The Early Years	Louis Rudolph, executive producer; John Brice and Sandra Saxon Brice, producers	NBC
1987 (39th)	Pack of Lies	Robert Halmi Jr., executive producer; Robert Halmi Sr., producer	CBS
1987 (39th)	Unnatural Causes	Blue André and Robert M. Myman, executive producers; Stephen Doran and Martin M. Goldstein, co-producers	NBC
1988 (40th)
1988 (40th)	Inherit the Wind	Peter Douglas, executive producer; Robert Papazian, producer	NBC
1988 (40th)	The Ann Jillian Story	Andrea Baynes, executive producer; Peter J. Thompson, producer	NBC
1988 (40th)	The Attic: The Hiding of Anne Frank	Michael Lepiner and Kenneth Kaufman, executive producers; David Cunliffe and William Hanley, co-executive producers; John Erman, supervising producer; Marjorie Kalins, Timothy J. Fee and Nick Gillott, producers	ABC
1988 (40th)	Foxfire	Marian Rees, executive producer; Dorothea G. Petrie, producer	CBS
1988 (40th)	The Taking of Flight 847: The Uli Derickson Story	Jim Calio and David Hume Kennerly, executive producers; Jay Benson, producer	NBC
1989 (41st)
1989 (41st)	Day One	Aaron Spelling and E. Duke Vincent, executive producers; David W. Rintels, producer	CBS
1989 (41st)	Roe vs. Wade	Michael Manheim, executive producer; Gregory Hoblit, producer; Alison Cross, co-producer	NBC
1989 (41st)	David	Donald March, producer; John Erman, supervising producer	ABC
1989 (41st)	Murderers Among Us: The Simon Wiesenthal Story	Bob Cooper, Abby Mann and Graham Benson, executive producers; John Kemeny, producer	HBO
1989 (41st)	My Name Is Bill W.	Peter K. Duchow and James Garner, executive producers; Daniel Petrie, producer	ABC

=== 1990s ===
Year	Program	Producers	Network
Outstanding Drama/Comedy Special
1990 (42nd)
1990 (42nd)	Caroline?	Les Alexander, Dan Enright and Don Enright, executive producers; Joseph Broido and Barbara Hiser, co-executive producers; Dorothea G. Petrie, producer	CBS
1990 (42nd)	The Incident	Robert Halmi Jr., executive producer; Bill Brademan and Edwin Self, producers	CBS
1990 (42nd)	The Final Days	Stu Samuels, executive producer; Richard L. O'Connor, producer; Susan Weber-Gold, co-producer	ABC
1990 (42nd)	A Killing in a Small Town	Bruce J. Sallan, executive producer; Dan Witt and Courtney Pledger, producers; Cynthia Cidre, co-producer	CBS
1990 (42nd)	Murder in Mississippi	David L. Wolper and Bernard Sofronski, executive producers; Tova Laiter, co-executive producer; Mark Wolper, producer	NBC
Outstanding Drama/Comedy Special and Miniseries
1991 (43rd) (Note: In 1991 and from 2011 to 2013, television movies and miniseries competed in a combined category for Outstanding Miniseries or Movie.)
1991 (43rd)	Separate but Equal (miniseries)	Stan Margulies and George Stevens Jr., executive producers	ABC
1991 (43rd)	Decoration Day (TV Movie)	Marian Rees, executive producer; Joyce Corrington, co-producer; Dick Gallegly, line producer; Anne Hopkins, producer	NBC
1991 (43rd)	The Josephine Baker Story (TV Movie)	Robert Halmi and David Puttnam, executive producers; John Kemeny, producer	HBO
1991 (43rd)	Paris Trout (TV Movie)	Diana Kerew, executive producer; Frank Konigsberg and Larry Sanitsky, producers	Showtime
1991 (43rd)	Sarah, Plain and Tall (TV Movie)	Glenn Close and William Self, executive producers; Edwin Self, supervising producer; Glenn Jordan, producer	CBS
1991 (43rd)	Switched at Birth (miniseries)	Richard Heus, Lawrence Horowitz, Barry Morrow, and Michael O'Hara, executive producers; Mark Sennet, supervising producer; Ervin Zavada, producer	NBC
Outstanding Made for Television Movie
1992 (44th)
1992 (44th)	Miss Rose White	Marian Rees, executive producer; Andrea Baynes and Francine Lefrak, co-executive producer; Anne Hopkins, producer	NBC
1992 (44th)	Doing Time on Maple Drive	Paul Lussier, executive producer	Fox
1992 (44th)	Homefront	David Jacobs, Lynn Marie Latham and Bernard Lechowick, executive producers; Christopher Chulack, producer	ABC
1992 (44th)	I'll Fly Away	Joshua Brand and John Falsey, executive producers; Ian Sander, producer; John Forrest Niss, co-producer	NBC
1992 (44th)	Without Warning: The James Brady Story	David Puttnam, executive producer; Fred Berner, producer	HBO
1993 (45th)
1993 (45th)	Barbarians at the Gate	Thomas M. Hammel and Glenn Jordan, executive producers; Ray Stark, producer; Marykay Powell, co-producer	HBO
1993 (45th)	Stalin	Mark Carliner, producer; Donald L. West, line producer; Ilene Kahn Power, co-producer	HBO
1993 (45th)	Citizen Cohn	Mark Rosenberg, Paula Weinstein and Linda Gottlieb, executive producers; Doro Bachrach, producer	HBO
1993 (45th)	The Positively True Adventures of the Alleged Texas Cheerleader-Murdering Mom	Frederick S. Pierce and Kyle A. Heinrich, executive producers; James Manos Jr., producer	HBO
1993 (45th)	Tru	Lindsay Law and Samuel Paul, executive producers; Michael Bronson, producer	PBS
1994 (46th)
1994 (46th)	And the Band Played On	Aaron Spelling and E. Duke Vincent, executive producers; Midge Sanford and Sarah Pillsbury, producers	HBO
1994 (46th)	Breathing Lessons	Richard Welsh, executive producer; Andrew Gottlieb, supervising producer; John Erman, producer; Brent Shields, co-producer	CBS
1994 (46th)	Gypsy	Robert Halmi Sr., Craig Zadan, Neil Meron and Bonnie Bruckheimer, executive producers; Emile Ardolino and Cindy Gilmore, producers	CBS
1994 (46th)	A Place for Annie	Marcy Gross and Ann Weston, executive producers; Diane Walsh, producer; Cathleen Young and Lee Guthrie, co-producers	ABC
1994 (46th)	To Dance with the White Dog	Patricia Clifford and Richard Welsh, executive producers; Bruce Savin, co-executive producer; Glenn Jordan, producer; Brent Shields, co-producer	CBS
1995 (47th)
1995 (47th)	Indictment: The McMartin Trial	Oliver Stone, Janet Yang and Abby Mann, executive producers; Diana Pokorny, producer	HBO
1995 (47th)	The Burning Season	David Puttnam, executive producer; John Frankenheimer and Thomas M. Hammel, producers; Diane Batson-Smith, co-producer	HBO
1995 (47th)	Citizen X	Matthew Chapman, Laura Bickford and David R. Ginsburg, executive producers; Timothy Marx, producer	HBO
1995 (47th)	The Piano Lesson	Richard Welsh and Craig Anderson, executive producers; August Wilson, producer; Robert Huddleston, line producer; Brent Shields, co-producer	CBS
1995 (47th)	Serving in Silence: The Margarethe Cammermeyer Story	Barbra Streisand, Glenn Close, Craig Zadan, Neil Meron and Cis Corman, executive producers; Richard Heus, producer	NBC
1996 (48th)
1996 (48th)	Truman	Paula Weinstein and Anthea Sylbert, executive producers; Doro Bachrach, producer	HBO
1996 (48th)	Almost Golden: The Jessica Savitch Story	Bernard Sofronski, executive producer; Adam Haight, line producer	Lifetime
1996 (48th)	The Heidi Chronicles	Michael Brandman, executive producer; Leanne Moore, co-executive producer; Steven J. Brandman, co-producer	TNT
1996 (48th)	The Late Shift	Ivan Reitman, executive producer; Joe Medjuck and Daniel Goldberg, co-executive producers; Don Carmody, producer	HBO
1996 (48th)	Tuskegee Airmen	Frank Price, executive producer; Robert Williams, co-executive producer; Bill Carraro, producer; Carol Bahoric, co-producer	HBO
1997 (49th)
1997 (49th)	Miss Evers' Boys	Robert Benedetti and Laurence Fishburne, executive producers; Derek Kavanagh and Kip Konwiser, producers; Kern Konwiser and Peter Stelzer, co-producers	HBO
1997 (49th)	Bastard out of Carolina	Gary Hoffman, executive producer; Amanda DiGiulio, producer	Showtime
1997 (49th)	Gotti	Gary Lucchesi, executive producer; David Coatsworth, producer; Robert McMinn, co-producer	HBO
1997 (49th)	If These Walls Could Talk	Suzanne Todd and Demi Moore, executive producers; Laura Greenlee, line producer; J.J. Klein, associate producer	HBO
1997 (49th)	In the Gloaming	Frederick Zollo, Nicholas Paleologos and Michael J. Fuchs, executive producers; Nellie Nugiel, producer; Bonnie Timmermann, co-producer	HBO
1998 (50th)
1998 (50th)	Don King: Only in America	Thomas Carter, executive producer; David Blocker, producer	HBO
1998 (50th)	A Bright Shining Lie	Lois Bonfiglio, executive producer; Greg Ricketson, producer	HBO
1998 (50th)	Gia	Marvin Worth, Ilene Kahn Power and David R. Ginsburg, executive producers; James D. Brubaker, producer	HBO
1998 (50th)	12 Angry Men	Terence A. Donnelly, producer	Showtime
1998 (50th)	What the Deaf Man Heard	Richard Welsh, executive producer; Brent Shields, co-executive producer; Tom Luse, supervising producer	CBS
1999 (51st)
1999 (51st)	A Lesson Before Dying	Ellen M. Krass, Joel Stillerman and Ted Demme, executive producers; Robert Benedetti, producer	HBO
1999 (51st)	The Baby Dance	Jodie Foster, Robert Halmi Jr., Tony Allard and Matthew O'Connor, executive producers; Meg LeFauve and Vicky Herman, producers	Showtime
1999 (51st)	Dash and Lilly	Stan Margulies, Antony Root and Delia Fine, executive producers; Craig McNeil and Jerrold L. Ludwig, producers	A&E
1999 (51st)	Pirates of Silicon Valley	Nick Lombardo and Steven Haft, executive producers; Leanne Moore, producer	TNT
1999 (51st)	The Rat Pack	Neal H. Moritz, executive producer; Fred C. Caruso, producer	HBO

=== 2000s ===
Year	Program	Producers	Network
Outstanding Made for Television Movie
2000 (52nd)
2000 (52nd)	Tuesdays with Morrie	Oprah Winfrey and Kate Forte, executive producers; Jennifer Ogden, supervising producer	ABC
2000 (52nd)	Annie	Craig Zadan, Neil Meron, Chris Montan and Marykay Powell, executive producers; John Whitman, producer	ABC
2000 (52nd)	If These Walls Could Talk 2	Suzanne Todd, Jennifer Todd and Ellen DeGeneres, executive producers; Mary Kane, producer	HBO
2000 (52nd)	Introducing Dorothy Dandridge	Moctesuma Esparza, Robert A. Katz, Joshua D. Maurer, Halle Berry and Vincent Cirrincione, executive producers; Larry Y. Albucher, producer	HBO
2000 (52nd)	RKO 281	Ridley Scott and Tony Scott, executive producers; Diane Minter Lewis and Chris Zarpas, co-executive producer; Su Armstrong, producer	HBO
2001 (53rd)
2001 (53rd)	Wit	Cary Brokaw and Mike Nichols, executive producers; Simon Bosanquet, producer	HBO
2001 (53rd)	Conspiracy	Frank Doelger, Frank Pierson, David M. Thompson and Peter Zinner, executive producers; Nick Gillott, producer	HBO
2001 (53rd)	For Love or Country: The Arturo Sandoval Story	Jellybean Benitez and Andy García, executive producers; Celia D. Costas, producer	HBO
2001 (53rd)	Laughter on the 23rd Floor	Emanuel Azenberg and Neil Simon, executive producers; Jeffrey Lampert, producer	Showtime
2001 (53rd)	61*	Billy Crystal and Ross Greenburg, executive producers; Robert F. Colesberry, producer	HBO
2002 (54th)
2002 (54th)	The Gathering Storm	Ridley Scott, Tony Scott and Julie Payne, executive producers; Tracey Scoffield, executive producer for BBC; Lisa Ellzey, co-executive producer; David M. Thompson and Frank Doelger, producers	HBO
2002 (54th)	Dinner with Friends	Norman Jewison, Margo Lion, Daryl Roth and Laura Ziskin, executive producers; Patrick Markey, producer	HBO
2002 (54th)	James Dean	Bill Gerber and Mark Rydell, executive producers; George W. Perkins, produced by	TNT
2002 (54th)	The Laramie Project	Anne Carey, Ted Hope and Ross Katz, executive producers; Roy Gabay and Peter Cane, co-executive producers; Declan Baldwin, producer	HBO
2002 (54th)	Path to War	Cary Brokaw, Howard Dratch, John Frankenheimer and Edgar J. Scherick, executive producers; Guy Riedel, producer	HBO
2003 (55th)
2003 (55th)	Door to Door	Dan Angel, Billy Brown and David A. Rosemont, executive producers; Robert J. King and Forest Whitaker, co-executive producers; Warren Carr, producer	TNT
2003 (55th)	Homeless to Harvard: The Liz Murray Story	Barnet Bain, Tom Patricia and Stephen Simon, executive producers; Liz Murray and Alan Nevins, co-executive producers; Michael Mahoney, produced by	Lifetime
2003 (55th)	Live from Baghdad	Sara Colleton and Rosalie Swedlin, executive producers; George W. Perkins, producer	HBO
2003 (55th)	My House in Umbria	Robert Allan Ackerman and Frank Doelger, executive producers; Ann Wingate, producer	HBO
2003 (55th)	Normal	Cary Brokaw and Lydia Pilcher, executive producers	HBO
2004 (56th)
2004 (56th)	Something the Lord Made	Robert W. Cort, Eric Hetzel and David Madden, executive producers; Michael Drake and Julian Krainin, producers	HBO
2004 (56th)	Ike: Countdown to D-Day	Lionel Chetwynd, Delia Fine and Stephanie Germain, executive producers; David Craig, supervising producer; Dennis Brown, produced by	A&E
2004 (56th)	And Starring Pancho Villa as Himself	Larry Gelbart, Mark Gordon and Joshua D. Maurer, executive producers; Gary Levinsohn, co-executive producer; Diane Sillan Isaacs, Sue Jett and Tony Mark, producers	HBO
2004 (56th)	The Lion in Winter	Robert Halmi Jr., Robert Halmi Sr., Wendy Neuss-Stewart, Martin Poll and Patrick Stewart, executive producers; Dyson Lovell, producer	Showtime
2004 (56th)	The Reagans	Neil Meron and Craig Zadan, executive producers; Robert Allan Ackerman and Dave Mace, co-executive producers; Lynn Raynor, producer	Showtime
2005 (57th)
2005 (57th)	Warm Springs	Celia D. Costas and Mark Gordon, executive producers; Chrisann Verges, producer	HBO
2005 (57th)	Lackawanna Blues	Halle Berry, Vincent Cirrincione, Ruben Santiago-Hudson and Shelby Stone, executive producers; Nellie Rachel Nugiel, producer	HBO
2005 (57th)	The Life and Death of Peter Sellers	Freddy DeMann, George S. J. Faber, Charles Pattinson and David M. Thompson, executive producers; Simon Bosanquet, producer	HBO
2005 (57th)	The Office Special	Anil Gupta and Jon Plowman, executive producers; Paul Lee, executive producer for BBC America; Ash Atalla, producer	BBC America
2005 (57th)	The Wool Cap	Elaine Frontain Bryant, Frances Croke Page and David A. Rosemont, executive producers; William H. Macy and Steven Schachter, producers; Irene Litinsky, produced by	TNT
2006 (58th)
2006 (58th)	The Girl in the Café	Paul Abbott and Richard Curtis, executive producers; Hilary Bevan Jones, produced by	HBO
2006 (58th)	Flight 93	David Gerber, executive producer; Clara George, produced by	A&E
2006 (58th)	Mrs. Harris	Elizabeth Karlsen, Pamela Koffler, Christine Vachon and John Wells, executive producers; Chrisann Verges, produced by	HBO
2006 (58th)	Yesterday	Sudhir Pragjee and Sanjeev Singh, executive producers; Anant Singh and Helena Spring, produced by	HBO
2006 (58th)	The Flight That Fought Back	Christina Bavetta and Philip Marlow, producers; Phil Craig, produced by	Discovery
2007 (59th)
2007 (59th)	Bury My Heart at Wounded Knee	Tom Thayer and Dick Wolf, executive producers; Yves Simoneau, co-executive producer; Clara George, produced by	HBO
2007 (59th)	Longford	Peter Morgan and Andy Harries, executive producers; Helen Flint, produced by	HBO
2007 (59th)	9/11: The Twin Towers	Richard Dale, Denys Blakeway and Bill Howard, executive producers; Tim Goodchild, producer	Discovery
2007 (59th)	The Ron Clark Story	Howard Burkons, Brenda Friend, Adam Gilad, Sunta Izzicupo, Jody Brockway and Frances Croke Page, executive producers; Craig McNeil, produced by	TNT
2007 (59th)	Why I Wore Lipstick to My Mastectomy	Jack Grossbart and Linda L. Kent, executive producers; Peter Werner, co-executive producer; Terry Gould, produced by	Lifetime
2008 (60th)
2008 (60th)	Recount	Paula Weinstein, Len Amato, Sydney Pollack and Jay Roach, executive producers; Michael Hausman, produced by	HBO
2008 (60th)	Bernard and Doris	Jonathan Cavendish, Adam Kassen, Mark Kassen, Bob Balaban, Dana Brunetti and Kevin Spacey, executive producers; Mark Olsen, co-executive producer	HBO
2008 (60th)	Extras: The Extra Special Series Finale	Ricky Gervais, Stephen Merchant and Jon Plowman, executive producers; Charlie Hanson, producer	HBO
2008 (60th)	The Memory Keeper's Daughter	Howard Braunstein and Michael Jaffe, executive producers; Michael Mahoney, produced by	Lifetime
2008 (60th)	A Raisin in the Sun	Craig Zadan, Neil Meron, Sean Combs, Carl Rumbaugh, Susan Batson and David Binder, executive producers; John M. Eckert, produced by	ABC
2009 (61st)
2009 (61st)	Grey Gardens	Lucy Barzun Donnelly, Rachael Horovitz and Michael Sucsy, executive producers; David Coatsworth, produced by	HBO
2009 (61st)	Coco Chanel	Carrie Stein, executive producer; Luca Bernabei and Christian Duguay, producers	Lifetime
2009 (61st)	Into the Storm	Ridley Scott and David M. Thompson, executive producers; Frank Doelger, Tracey Scoffield, Julie Payne and Ann Wingate, produced by	HBO
2009 (61st)	Prayers for Bobby	Stanley M. Brooks, David Permut, Daniel Sladek and Chris Taaffe, executive producers; Damian Ganczewski, producer	Lifetime
2009 (61st)	Taking Chance	Brad Krevoy, Cathy Wischner-Sola and Ross Katz, executive producers; William Teitler, co-executive producers; Lori Keith Douglas, produced by	HBO

=== 2010s ===
Year	Program	Producers	Network
Outstanding Made for Television Movie
2010 (62nd)
2010 (62nd)	Temple Grandin	Gil Bellows, Dante Di Loreto, Anthony Edwards, Paul Lister, Alison Owen and Emily Gerson Saines, executive producers; Scott Ferguson, producer	HBO
2010 (62nd)	Endgame	David Aukin and Hal Vogel, producers	PBS
2010 (62nd)	Georgia O'Keeffe	Joan Allen, Joshua D. Maurer and Alixandre Witlin, executive producers; Tony Mark, producer	Lifetime
2010 (62nd)	Moonshot	Richard Dale and Juliette Howell, executive producers; Tim Goodchild and Michael Robins, producers	History
2010 (62nd)	The Special Relationship	Andy Harries, Kathleen Kennedy, Christine Langan, Frank Marshall and Peter Morgan, executive producers; Frank Doelger, Tracey Scoffield and Ann Wingate, producer	HBO
2010 (62nd)	You Don't Know Jack	Tom Fontana, Steve Lee Jones, Barry Levinson, Lydia Dean Pilcher and Glenn Rigberg, executive producers; Scott Ferguson, producer	HBO
Outstanding Miniseries or Movie
2011 (63rd)
2011 (63rd)	Downton Abbey (miniseries)	Gareth Neame, Rebecca Eaton, and Julian Fellowes, executive producers; Nigel Marchant, producer; Liz Trubridge, series producer	PBS
2011 (63rd)	The Kennedys (miniseries)	Jonathan Koch, Steve Michaels, Jon Cassar, Stephen Kronish, Michael Prupas, Jamie Paul Rock, Joel Surnow, David McKillop, Dirk Hoogstra, Christine Shipton, and Tara Ellis, executive producers; Brian Gibson, supervising producer	ReelzChannel
2011 (63rd)	Cinema Verite	Gavin Polone and Zanne Devine, executive producers; Karyn McCarthy, producer	HBO
2011 (63rd)	Mildred Pierce (miniseries)	Christine Vachon, Pamela Koffler, John Wells, and Todd Haynes, executive producers; Ilene S. Landress, co-executive producer	HBO
2011 (63rd)	Too Big to Fail	Curtis Hanson, Paula Weinstein, and Jeffrey Levine, executive producers; Carol Fenelon, co-executive producer; Ezra Swerdlow, producer	HBO
2011 (63rd)	The Pillars of the Earth (miniseries)	David A. Rosemont, Jonas Bauer, Tim Halkin, Michael Prupas, David W. Zucker, Rola Bauer, Ridley Scott, and Tony Scott, executive producers; John Ryan, producer	Starz
2012 (64th)
2012 (64th)	Game Change	Tom Hanks, Gary Goetzman, and Jay Roach, executive producers; Danny Strong and Steven Shareshian, co-executive producers; Amy Sayres, producer	HBO
2012 (64th)	American Horror Story (miniseries)	Ryan Murphy, Brad Falchuk, and Dante Di Loreto, executive producers	FX
2012 (64th)	Hatfields & McCoys (miniseries)	Leslie Greif, Nancy Dubuc, and Dirk Hoogstra, executive producers; Barry Berg, supervising producer; Kevin Costner, Darrell Fetty, Herb Nanas, producer by; and Vlad Paunescu, producer	History
2012 (64th)	Hemingway & Gellhorn	Peter Kaufman, Trish Hofmann, James Gandolfini, Alexandra Ryan, and Barbara Turner, executive producers; Nancy Sanders and Mark Armstrong, co-executive producer	HBO
2012 (64th)	Luther (miniseries)	Phillippa Giles, executive producer; Katie Swinden, producer	BBC America
2012 (64th)	Sherlock: A Scandal in Belgravia	Beryl Vertue, Steven Moffat, Mark Gatiss, Rebecca Eaton, and Bethan Jones, executive producers; Sue Vertue, producer	PBS
2013 (65th)
2013 (65th)	Behind the Candelabra	Jerry Weintraub, executive producer; Gregory Jacobs, Susan Ekins, and Michael Polaire, producers	HBO
2013 (65th)	American Horror Story: Asylum (miniseries)	Ryan Murphy, Brad Falchuk, Dante Di Loreto, and Tim Minear, executive producers; Jennifer Salt, James Wong, Jessica Sharzer, and Bradley Buecker, co-executive producers; and Alexis Martin Woodall, producer	FX
2013 (65th)	The Bible (miniseries)	Mark Burnett, Roma Downey, Richard Bedser, Nancy Dubuc, Dirk Hoogstra, Julian P. Hobbs, executive producers	History
2013 (65th)	Phil Spector	Barry Levinson and David Mamet, executive producers; and Michael Hausman, producer	HBO
2013 (65th)	Political Animals (miniseries)	Greg Berlanti, Laurence Mark, and Sarah Caplan, executive producers; and Melissa Kellner Berman, co-executive producer	USA
2013 (65th)	Top of the Lake (miniseries)	Emile Sherman, Iain Canning, and Jane Campion, executive producers; and Philippa Campbell, producer	Sundance
Outstanding Television Movie
2014 (66th)
2014 (66th)	The Normal Heart	Jason Blum, Dante Di Loreto, Dede Gardner, Ryan Murphy and Brad Pitt, executive producers; Mark Ruffalo, co-executive producer; Scott Ferguson and Alexis Martin Woodall, producers	HBO
2014 (66th)	Killing Kennedy	Mary Lisio, Bill O'Reilly, Howard T. Owens, Charlie Parsons, Ridley Scott, Noel Siegel, Teri Weinberg, Richard J. Wells and David W. Zucker, executive producers; Larry Rapaport, producer	Nat Geo
2014 (66th)	Muhammad Ali's Greatest Fight	Jonathan Cameron, Frank Doelger and Tracey Scoffield, executive producers; Scott Ferguson, producer	HBO
2014 (66th)	Sherlock: His Last Vow	Rebecca Eaton, Mark Gatiss, Steven Moffat, Beryl Vertue and Sue Vertue, executive producers	PBS
2014 (66th)	The Trip to Bountiful	Hallie Foote, Bill Haber, Jeffrey M. Hayes and Cicely Tyson, executive producers	Lifetime
2015 (67th)
2015 (67th)	Bessie	Richard D. Zanuck (posthumous), Lili Fini Zanuck, Queen Latifah, Shakim Compere, Shelby Stone and Randi Michel, executive producers; Ron Schmidt, producer	HBO
2015 (67th)	Agatha Christie's Poirot: Curtain, Poirot's Last Case	Michele Buck, Mathew Prichard, Hilary Strong, Karen Thrussell and Damien Timmer, executive producers; David Boulter, producer	Acorn TV
2015 (67th)	Grace of Monaco	Arash Amel, Uday Chopra and Pierre-Ange Le Pogam, producers	Lifetime
2015 (67th)	Hello Ladies: The Movie	Lee Eisenberg, Stephen Merchant and Gene Stupnitsky, executive producers; Dan Kaplow, producer	HBO
2015 (67th)	Killing Jesus	Walon Green, Mary Lisio, Heather Moran, Bill O'Reilly, Charlie Parsons, Ridley Scott, Teri Weinberg and David W. Zucker, executive producers; Aidan Elliott and Mark Huffam, producers	Nat Geo
2015 (67th)	Nightingale	Dede Gardner, Jeremy Kleiner, Elliott Lester, David Oyelowo, Brad Pitt, Josh Weinstock and Katrina Wolfe, executive producers; Lucas Akoskin, Alex Garcia and Jonathan Gray, co-executive producers	HBO
2016 (68th)
2016 (68th)	Sherlock: The Abominable Bride	Rebecca Eaton, Mark Gatiss, Steven Moffat, Beryl Vertue and Sue Vertue, executive producers	PBS
2016 (68th)	All the Way	Bryan Cranston, Justin Falvey, Darryl Frank, Jay Roach, Robert Schenkkan and Steven Spielberg, executive producers; James Degus and Michelle Graham, co-executive producer; Scott Ferguson, producer	HBO
2016 (68th)	Confirmation	Susannah Grant, Michael London, Kerry Washington and Janice Williams, executive producers; Darren Demetre, producer	HBO
2016 (68th)	A Very Murray Christmas	Roman Coppola, Sofia Coppola, Mitch Glazer, Tony Hernandez and Bill Murray, executive producers; Casey Patterson and Michael Zakin, co-executive producer; Lilly Burns and John Skidmore, producers	Netflix
2016 (68th)	Luther	Elizabeth Kilgarriff, executive producer; Marcus Wilson, producer	BBC America
2017 (69th)
2017 (69th)	Black Mirror: "San Junipero"	Charlie Brooker and Annabel Jones, executive producers; Laurie Borg, producer	Netflix
2017 (69th)	Dolly Parton's Christmas of Many Colors: Circle of Love	Sam Haskell, Dolly Parton, and Pamela K. Long, executive producers; Hudson Hickman, produced by	NBC
2017 (69th)	The Immortal Life of Henrietta Lacks	Oprah Winfrey, Carla Gardini, Alan Ball, Peter Macdissi, and Lydia Dean Pilcher, executive producers; Rebecca Skloot, co-executive producer; Kathryn Dean, produced by	HBO
2017 (69th)	The Wizard of Lies	Jane Rosenthal, Robert De Niro, Berry Welsh, Barry Levinson, and Tom Fontana, executive producers; Jason Sosnoff, co-executive producer; Joseph E. Iberti, produced by	HBO
2017 (69th)	Sherlock: The Lying Detective	Mark Gatiss, Steven Moffat, Beryl Vertue, Sue Vertue, Rebecca Eaton, and Bethan Jones, executive producers	PBS
2018 (70th)
2018 (70th)	Black Mirror: "USS Callister"	Charlie Brooker and Annabel Jones, executive producers; Louise Sutton, producer	Netflix
2018 (70th)	Flint	Queen Latifah, Shakim Compere, Katie Couric, Craig Zadan, and Neil Meron, executive producers; Mark Nicholson, co-executive producer; John M. Eckert, produced by	Lifetime
2018 (70th)	Paterno	Barry Levinson, Jason Sosnoff, Tom Fontana, Edward R. Pressman, Rick Nicita, and Lindsay Sloane, executive producers; Amy Herman, produced by	HBO
2018 (70th)	Fahrenheit 451	Sarah Green, Ramin Bahrani, Michael B. Jordan, Alan Gasmer, and Peter Jaysen, executive producers; David Coatsworth, produced by	HBO
2018 (70th)	The Tale	Jennifer Fox, Oren Moverman, Laura Rister, Mynette Louie, Simone Pero, Lawrence Inglee, Sol Bondy, Regina K. Scully, Lynda Weinman, and Reka Posta, produced by	HBO
2019 (71st)
2019 (71st)	Black Mirror: Bandersnatch	Annabel Jones and Charlie Brooker, executive producers; Russell McLean, producer	Netflix
2019 (71st)	Brexit	Juliette Howell, Tessa Ross and James Graham, executive producers; Lynn Horsford, producer	HBO
2019 (71st)	Deadwood: The Movie	David Milch, Carolyn Strauss, Gregg Fienberg, Scott Stephens, Daniel Minahan, Ian McShane and Timothy Olyphant, executive producers; Regina Corrado and Nichole Beattie, co-executive producers; Mark Tobey, produced by	HBO
2019 (71st)	My Dinner with Hervé	Steven Zaillian, Richard Middleton, Ross Katz, Jessica de Rothschild, Sacha Gervasi and Peter Dinklage, executive producers; Nathalie Tanner, produced by	HBO
2019 (71st)	King Lear	Colin Callender, Sonia Friedman and Scott Huff, executive producers; Noëlette Buckley, produced by	Prime Video

=== 2020s ===
Year	Program	Producers	Network
Outstanding Television Movie
2020 (72nd)
2020 (72nd)	Bad Education	Fred Berger, Eddie Vaisman, Julia Lebedev, Oren Moverman, Brian Kavanaugh-Jones and Mike Makowsky, produced by; Leonid Lebedev and Caroline Jaczko, executive producers	HBO
2020 (72nd)	American Son	Kerry Washington, Pilar Savone, Jeffrey Richards and Rebecca Gold, executive producers; Kenny Leon and Kristin Bernstein, produced by	Netflix
2020 (72nd)	Dolly Parton's Heartstrings: These Old Bones	Patrick Sean Smith, Sam Haskell and Dolly Parton, executive producers; Joe Lazarov, Lisa Melamed and Hudson Hickman, co-executive producers	Netflix
2020 (72nd)	El Camino: A Breaking Bad Movie	Diane Mercer, executive producer; Mark Johnson, Melissa Bernstein, Charles Newirth, Vince Gilligan and Aaron Paul, produced by	Netflix
2020 (72nd)	Unbreakable Kimmy Schmidt: Kimmy vs the Reverend	Robert Carlock, Tina Fey, Jeff Richmond, David Miner, Sam Means and Meredith Scardino, executive producers; Eric Gurian, co-executive producer; Kerry Orent, producer	Netflix
2021 (73rd)
2021 (73rd)	Dolly Parton's Christmas on the Square	Dolly Parton, Maria S. Schlatter, Debbie Allen and Sam Haskell, executive producers; Joe Lazarov and Hudson Hickman, co-executive producers	Netflix
2021 (73rd)	Oslo	Marc Platt, Steven Spielberg, Kristie Macosko Krieger, David Litvak, Jared LeBoff, Adam Siegel, Cambra Overend, Bartlett Sher and J. T. Rogers, executive producers; Holly Bario, Matthew Stillman and David Minkowski, co-executive producers; Gary Michael Walters, Michel Litvak and Svetlana Metkina, producers; Mark Taylor, produced by	HBO
2021 (73rd)	Robin Roberts Presents: Mahalia	Robin Roberts, Linda Berman, Sebastian Dungan and Mekita Faiye, executive producers; Danielle Brooks and Kenny Leon, co-executive producers; Charles Cooper and Allen Lewis, producers; Moshe Bardach, produced by	Lifetime
2021 (73rd)	Sylvie's Love	Tessa Thompson, Bobbi Sue Luther, Akbar Gbajabiamila and Matt Rachamkin, executive producers; Arinze Okwuadigbo, Obinna Okwuadigbo, Jay Gaines and Carl Daryl Washington, co-executive producers; Nnamdi Asomugha, Gabrielle Glore, Jonathan T. Baker, Eugene Ashe and Matthew Thurm, produced by	Prime Video
2021 (73rd)	Uncle Frank	Bob Osher, Andrew Golov, Christopher Tricarico, Josh Peters and Isaac Ericson, executive producers; Bill Block, Michael Costigan, Jay Van Hoy, Stephanie Meurer, Peter Macdissi and Alan Ball, produced by	Prime Video
2022 (74th)
2022 (74th)	Chip 'n Dale: Rescue Rangers	Alexander Young and Tom Peitzman, executive producers; Todd Lieberman and David Hoberman, produced by	Disney+
2022 (74th)	Ray Donovan: The Movie	David Hollander, Liev Schreiber, Mark Gordon, Bryan Zuriff and Lou Fusaro, executive producers; Jason Weinberg, producer; John H. Radulovic, produced by	Showtime
2022 (74th)	Reno 911!: The Hunt for QAnon	Thomas Lennon, Robert Ben Garant, Kerri Kenney-Silver, Cedric Yarbrough, Niecy Nash, Carlos Alazraqui, Wendi McLendon-Covey, John Landgraf, Michael Shamberg, Stacey Sher, Danny DeVito, Peter Principato, Christian Hoffman and David Lincoln, executive producers; Mary Birdsong and Ian Roberts, producers; Cass Gundry, produced by	Paramount+
2022 (74th)	The Survivor	Ben Foster, executive producer; Matti Leshem, Aaron L. Gilbert, Barry Levinson, Jason Sosnoff and Scott Pardo, produced by	HBO
2022 (74th)	Zoey's Extraordinary Christmas	Austin Winsberg, Eric Tannenbaum, Kim Tannenbaum, Paul Feig, David Blackman, Daniel Inkeles and Richard Shepard, executive producers; Jason Wang, Dan Magnante and Mandy Moore, co-executive producers; Michele Greco, producer	Roku
2023 (75th)
2023 (75th)	Weird: The Al Yankovic Story	Henry R. Muñoz III, Neil Shah and Zachary Halley, executive producers; Mike Farah, Joe Farrell, Whitney Hodack, Tim Headington, Lia Buman, Max Silva, Al Yankovic and Eric Appel, produced by	The Roku Channel
2023 (75th)	Dolly Parton's Mountain Magic Christmas	Sam Haskell, Joe Lazarov, Hudson Hickman, David Rambo and Dolly Parton, executive producers; Billy Levin and Steve Summers, producers	NBC
2023 (75th)	Fire Island	Joel Kim Booster, executive producer; John Hodges, Tony Hernandez and Brooke Posch, producers	Hulu
2023 (75th)	Hocus Pocus 2	Ralph Winter, David Kirschner and Adam Shankman, executive producers; Lynn Harris, produced by	Disney+
2023 (75th)	Prey	Lawrence Gordon, Ben Rosenblatt, James E. Thomas, John C. Thomas and Marc Toberoff, executive producers; John Davis, Jhane Myers and Marty Ewing, produced by	Hulu
2024 (76th)
2024 (76th)	Quiz Lady	Alex Brown and Erika Hampson, executive producers; Will Ferrell, Jessica Elbaum, Maggie Haskins, Itay Reiss, Jen D'Angelo, Awkwafina and Sandra Oh, produced by	Hulu
2024 (76th)	Mr. Monk's Last Case: A Monk Movie	Randy Zisk, Tony Shalhoub, Andy Breckman and David Hoberman, executive producers; Lena Cordina, produced by	Peacock
2024 (76th)	Red, White & Royal Blue	Casey McQuiston, Michael Riley McGrath, Matthew López and Michael S. Constable, executive producers; Greg Berlanti and Sarah Schechter, produced by	Prime Video
2024 (76th)	Scoop	Sam McAlister and Sanjay Singhal, executive producers; Radford Neville and Hilary Salmon, produced by	Netflix
2024 (76th)	Unfrosted	Andy Robin, Barry Marder and Cherylanne Martin, executive producers; Jerry Seinfeld, Spike Feresten and Beau Bauman, produced by	Netflix
2025 (77th)
2025 (77th)	Rebel Ridge	Daniel Jason Heffner, Macon Blair and Louise Lovegrove, executive producers; Anish Savjani, Neil Kopp, Vincent Savino and Jeremy Saulnier, produced by	Netflix
2025 (77th)	Bridget Jones: Mad About the Boy	Helen Fielding, Renée Zellweger, Amelia Granger and Sarah-Jane Wright, executive producers; Tim Bevan, Eric Fellner and Jo Wallett, produced by	Peacock
2025 (77th)	The Gorge	Miles Teller and Marc Evans, executive producers; David Ellison, Dana Goldberg, Don Granger, Scott Derrickson, C. Robert Cargill, Sherryl Clark, Adam Kolbrenner, Zach Dean and Gregory Goodman, produced by	Apple TV+
2025 (77th)	Mountainhead	Jesse Armstrong, Frank Rich, Lucy Prebble, Tony Roche, Jon Brown, Will Tracy, Jill Footlick and Mark Mylod, executive producers	HBO
2025 (77th)	Nonnas	Scott Budnick, Ameet Shukla, Jay Peterson, Todd Lubin, Leah Gonzalez, Stacy Calabrese, Amanda Morgan Palmer, Alexis Garcia, Jody Scaravella, Pamela Hirsch, Christopher Slager, Dan Guando and Vince Vaughn, executive producers; Gigi Pritzker, Rachel Shane and Jack Turner, produced by	Netflix
Outstanding Movie
2026 (78th)
2026 (78th)	Remarkably Bright Creatures	Alyssa Rodrigues, Erika Hampson, Olivia Newman, Shelby Van Pelt, Tony Lipp and Alisa Tager, executive producers; Bryan Unkeless, Peter Craig and David Levine, produced by	Netflix
2026 (78th)	Heads of State	Marcus Viscidi, Josh Appelbaum, André Nemec, John Cena and Idris Elba, executive producers; Peter Safran and John Rickard, produced by	Prime Video
2026 (78th)	Miss You, Love You	Mike Bowes, executive producer; Gigi Pritzker, Rachel Shane, Kevin J. Walsh and Nat Faxon, produced by	HBO
2026 (78th)	People We Meet on Vacation	Laura Quicksilver, Ted Gidlow and Emily Henry, executive producers; Wyck Godfrey, Marty Bowen and Isaac Klausner, produced by	Netflix
2026 (78th)	Tom Clancy's Jack Ryan: Ghost War	Alexa Ginsburg, Carlton Cuse, John J. Kelly and Tom Clancy, executive producers; John Krasinski, Allyson Seeger and Andrew Form, produced by	Prime Video

== Programs with multiple wins ==
3 wins

- Black Mirror (consecutive)

== Producers with multiple awards ==
4 awards

- David Susskind

3 awards

- Charlie Brooker
- Annabel Jones
- Harry R. Sherman

2 awards

- Robert Benedetti
- Dante Di Loreto
- Scott Ferguson
- Glenn Jordan
- Daniel Melnick
- Dorothea G. Petrie
- Marian Rees
- Jay Roach
- George Schaefer
- Aaron Spelling
- E. Duke Vincent
- Paula Weinstein

== Programs with multiple nominations ==
Totals include continuing series, but not sequels or revivals as is the case with Eleanor and Franklin and Eleanor and Franklin: The White House Years alongside both the Death of a Salesman 1967 and 1985 versions of Death of a Salesman, and others.

4 nominations

- Sherlock

3 nominations

- Black Mirror

2 nominations

- Luther

== Producers with multiple nominations ==
8 nominations

- David Susskind

7 nominations

- George Schaefer

6 nominations

- Frank Doelger
- Neil Meron
- Ridley Scott
- Craig Zadan

5 nominations

- Rebecca Eaton
- Scott Ferguson
- Glenn Jordan

4 nominations

- Herbert Brodkin
- Dante Di Loreto
- Alan Landsburg
- Robert Halmi Jr.
- Robert Halmi Sr.
- Sam Haskell
- Hudson Hickman
- Barry Levinson
- Steven Moffat
- Dolly Parton
- Marian Rees
- Tracey Scoffield
- Brent Shields
- Martin Starger
- David M. Thompson
- Beryl Vertue
- Sue Vertue
- Paula Weinstein
- Richard Welsh

3 nominations

- Frederick H. Brogger
- Cary Brokaw
- Charlie Brooker
- Robert W. Christiansen
- David Coatsworth
- John Erman
- Tom Fontana
- Dirk Hoogstra
- Annabel Jones
- Ross Katz
- Frank Konigsberg
- Joe Lazarov
- Kenny Leon
- Richard Levinson
- William Link
- Abby Mann
- Joshua D. Maurer
- Ryan Murphy
- Dorothea G. Petrie
- Lydia Dean Pilcher
- David Puttnam
- Jay Roach
- David A. Rosemount
- Rick Rosenberg
- Edgar J. Scherick
- Tony Scott
- Harry R. Sherman
- Ann Wingate
- David W. Zucker

2 nominations

- Robert Allan Ackerman
- Doro Bachrach
- Alan Ball
- Philip Barry Jr.
- Andrea Baynes
- Robert Benedetti
- Robert Berger
- Halle Berry
- Simon Bosanquet
- Vincent Cirrincione
- Cecil Clarke
- Glenn Close
- Fred Coe
- Shakim Compere
- Robert F. Colesberry
- Celia Costas
- Richard Dale
- Peter Douglas
- Nancy Dubuc
- Peter K. Duchow
- John M. Eckert
- Brad Falchuk
- Delia Fine
- Bill Finnegan
- John Frankenheimer
- Dede Gardner
- James Garner
- David Gerber
- Clara George
- Nick Gillott
- David R. Ginsburg
- Tim Goodchild
- Mark Gordon
- Linda Gottlieb
- Thomas M. Hammel
- Erika Hampson
- Andy Harries
- Michael Hausman
- Richard Heus
- Anne Hopkins
- Juliette Howell
- Bethan Jones
- Queen Latifah
- Norman Lear
- Mary Lisio
- Fay Kanin
- John Kemeny
- Pamela Koffler
- Audrey Maas
- Peter Macdissi
- Michael Mahoney
- Philip Mandelker
- Sam Manners
- Stan Margulies
- Tony Mark
- Craig McNeil
- Daniel Melnick
- Stephen Merchant
- Leanne Moore
- Peter Morgan
- Oren Moverman
- Nellie Rachel Nugiel
- David J. O'Connell
- Richard L. O'Connor
- Bill O'Reilly
- Frances Croke Page
- Robert Papazian
- Charlie Parsons
- Julie Payne
- George W. Perkins
- Brad Pitt
- Jon Plowman
- Marykay Powell
- Ilene Kahn Power
- Gigi Pritzker
- Michael Prupas
- David W. Rintels
- Edwin Self
- Rachel Shane
- Bernard Sofronski
- Jason Sosnoff
- Steve Spielberg
- Aaron Spelling
- Shelby Stone
- Ernest Tidyman
- Suzanne Todd
- Christine Vachon
- Chrisann Verges
- David Victor
- E. Duke Vincent
- Kerry Washington
- Teri Weinberg
- John Wells
- Oprah Winfrey
- Alexis Martin Woodall

== Total awards by network ==
- HBO/HBO Max – 22
- NBC – 9
- CBS – 8
- Netflix – 6
- ABC – 5
- Disney+ – 1
- Hulu – 1
- PBS – 1
- Syndicated – 1
- TNT – 1
- Roku Channel — 1

== See also ==
- Primetime Emmy Award for Outstanding Limited Series
- Primetime Emmy Award for Outstanding Miniseries or Movie
- TCA Award for Outstanding Achievement in Movies, Miniseries and Specials
- Golden Globe Award for Best Miniseries or Television Film
