= Thomas Newman discography =

Thomas Newman is an American composer, conductor and orchestrator known for his many film scores. Most notably The Player (1992); The Shawshank Redemption (1994); American Beauty and The Green Mile (both 1999); In the Bedroom (2001); Finding Nemo (2003); Lemony Snicket's A Series of Unfortunate Events (2004); Cinderella Man (2005); WALL-E (2008); the James Bond films Skyfall (2012) and Spectre (2015), 1917 (2019), and Elemental (2023).

== As a composer ==
=== Feature films ===
==== 1980s ====
Year	Title	Director(s)	Studio(s)	Notes
1984	Reckless	James Foley	Metro-Goldwyn-Mayer	—N/a
1984	Revenge of the Nerds	Jeff Kanew	Interscope Communications; 20th Century Fox	—N/a
1984	Grandview, U.S.A.	Randal Kleiser	CBS Entertainment Production; Warner Bros. (theatrical); CBS/Fox Video (VHS release); Paramount Home Entertainment (DVD release)	—N/a
1985	Desperately Seeking Susan	Susan Seidelman	Orion Pictures	Soundtrack released by Varèse Sarabande. Album shared with Making Mr. Right
1985	Girls Just Want to Have Fun	Alan Metter	New World Pictures	—N/a
1985	The Man with One Red Shoe	Stan Dragoti	20th Century Fox	An album of Newman's score released by La-La Land Records in 2018.
1985	Real Genius	Martha Coolidge	TriStar Pictures	—N/a
1986	Gung Ho	Ron Howard	Paramount Pictures	One track released by Milan on the compilation album Ron Howard – Passions & Achievements
1986	Jumpin' Jack Flash	Penny Marshall	Largo Entertainment; Silver Pictures; 20th Century Fox	Song album with two Newman tracks
1987	Light of Day	Paul Schrader	TriStar Pictures	Song album with one Newman track
1987	The Lost Boys	Joel Schumacher	Warner Bros.	Song album with one Newman track
1987	Less than Zero	Marek Kanievska	20th Century Fox	Song album; no Newman score; score album released by La-La Land Records in September 2016.
1988	The Great Outdoors	Howard Deutch	Hughes Entertainment; Universal Pictures	Song album with one Newman track
1988	The Prince of Pennsylvania	Ron Nyswaner	Fine Line Features; New Line Cinema	—N/a
1989	Cookie	Susan Seidelman	Lorimar Film Entertainment; Warner Bros.	—N/a

==== 1990s ====
Year	Title	Director(s)	Studio(s)	Notes
1990	Men Don't Leave	Paul Brickman	Geffen Pictures; Warner Bros.	—N/a
1990	Welcome Home, Roxy Carmichael	Jim Abrahams	Paramount Pictures	Soundtrack released by Varèse Sarabande
1991	Career Opportunities	Bryan Gordon	Hughes Entertainment; Universal Pictures	Song album with three Newman tracks released by Curb
1991	The Linguini Incident	Richard Shepard	Academy Entertainment	Soundtrack released by Varèse Sarabande
1991	Naked Tango	Leonard Schrader	New Line Cinema	—N/a
1991	The Rapture	Michael Tolkin	Fine Line Features; New Line Cinema	Song album with ten Newman tracks
1991	Deceived	Damian Harris	Touchstone Pictures	—N/a
1991	Fried Green Tomatoes	Jon Avnet	Act III Communications; Universal Pictures	Song album with three Newman tracks and separate score album, both released by MCA
1992	The Player	Robert Altman	Avenue Pictures; Spelling Films; Fine Line Features (US); Pathé (International)	Soundtrack released by Varèse Sarabande
1992	Whispers in the Dark	Christopher Crowe	Paramount Pictures	Varèse Sarabande album release cancelled; released by Intrada in 2012
1992	Scent of a Woman	Martin Brest	City Light Films; Universal Pictures	Soundtrack released by MCA
1993	Flesh and Bone	Steve Kloves	Paramount Pictures	Soundtrack released by Varèse Sarabande
1993	Josh and S.A.M.	Billy Weber	Castle Rock Entertainment; New Line Cinema; Columbia Pictures	Soundtrack released by Varèse Sarabande
1994	Threesome	Andrew Fleming	Motion Picture Corporation of America; TriStar Pictures	Soundtrack released by Varèse Sarabande. Twinned with American Buffalo
1994	The Favor	Donald Petrie	Orion Pictures	—N/a
1994	The Shawshank Redemption	Frank Darabont	Castle Rock Entertainment; Columbia Pictures	Soundtrack released by Epic Soundtrax
1994	The War	Jon Avnet	Universal Pictures	Song album with 12 Newman tracks released by MCA
1994	Little Women	Gillian Armstrong	Columbia Pictures	Soundtrack released by Sony Classical
1995	Unstrung Heroes	Diane Keaton	Hollywood Pictures	Soundtrack released by Hollywood Records
1995	How to Make an American Quilt	Jocelyn Moorhouse	Amblin Entertainment; Universal Pictures	Soundtrack released by MCA
1996	Up Close & Personal	Jon Avnet	Cinergi Pictures; Touchstone Pictures	Soundtrack released by Hollywood Records
1996	Phenomenon	Jon Turteltaub	Touchstone Pictures	Song album with one Newman track released by Reprise
1996	American Buffalo	Michael Corrente	Capitol Films; Channel Four Films; The Samuel Goldwyn Company	Soundtrack released by Varèse Sarabande. Twinned with Threesome
1996	The People vs. Larry Flynt	Miloš Forman	Phoenix Pictures; Columbia Pictures	Soundtrack released by Angel Records
1997	Red Corner	Jon Avnet	Avnet-Kerner Productions; Metro-Goldwyn-Mayer	Soundtrack released by EAR
1997	Mad City	Costa Gavras	Warner Bros.	Soundtrack released by Varèse Sarabande
1997	Oscar and Lucinda	Gillian Armstrong	Australian Film Finance Corporation; Fox Searchlight Pictures	Soundtrack released by Sony Classical
1998	The Horse Whisperer	Robert Redford	Touchstone Pictures	Soundtrack released by Hollywood Records
1998	Meet Joe Black	Martin Brest	City Light Films; Universal Pictures	Soundtrack released by Universal Records
1999	American Beauty	Sam Mendes	DreamWorks Pictures	Soundtrack released by DreamWorks Records
1999	The Green Mile	Frank Darabont	Castle Rock Entertainment; Warner Bros.	Soundtrack released by Warner Bros. Records.

==== 2000s ====
Year	Title	Director(s)	Studio(s)	Notes
2000	Erin Brockovich	Steven Soderbergh	Jersey Films; Universal Pictures (US); Columbia Pictures (International)	Soundtrack released by Sony Classical
2000	Pay It Forward	Mimi Leder	Bel Air Entertainment; Tapestry Films; Pathé; Warner Bros.	Soundtrack released by Varèse Sarabande
2001	In the Bedroom	Todd Field	Good Machine; Miramax Films	Soundtrack released by Varèse Sarabande
2002	The Salton Sea	D. J. Caruso	Castle Rock Entertainment; Warner Bros.	Soundtrack released by Varèse Sarabande
2002	Road to Perdition	Sam Mendes	The Zanuck Company; DreamWorks Pictures (US); 20th Century Fox (International)	Soundtrack released by Decca Records
2002	White Oleander	Peter Kosminsky	Warner Bros.	Soundtrack released by Varèse Sarabande
2003	Finding Nemo	Andrew Stanton	Pixar Animation Studios; Walt Disney Pictures	Newman's first score for an animated film Soundtrack released by Walt Disney Records
2004	Lemony Snicket's A Series of Unfortunate Events	Brad Silberling	Nickelodeon Movies; Paramount Pictures (US); DreamWorks Pictures (International)	Soundtrack released by Sony Classical
2005	Cinderella Man	Ron Howard	Imagine Entertainment; Miramax Films; Universal Pictures (North America); Buena Vista Pictures (International)	Soundtrack released by Decca Records
2005	Jarhead	Sam Mendes	Universal Pictures	Soundtrack released by Decca Records
2006	Little Children	Todd Field	New Line Cinema	Soundtrack released by Silva Screen Records
2006	The Good German	Steven Soderbergh	Virtual Studios; Section Eight Productions; Warner Bros.	Soundtrack released by Varèse Sarabande
2007	Towelhead	Alan Ball	Scott Rudin Productions; This is that Corporation; Warner Independent Pictures	Soundtrack released by Lakeshore Records
2008	WALL-E	Andrew Stanton	Pixar Animation Studios; Walt Disney Pictures	Soundtrack released by Walt Disney Records
2008	Revolutionary Road	Sam Mendes	BBC Films; DreamWorks Pictures; Paramount Vantage (US); United International Pictures (International)	Soundtrack released by Nonesuch
2009	Brothers	Jim Sheridan	Relativity Media; Lionsgate	Soundtrack released by Relativity Music Group

==== 2010s ====
Year	Title	Director(s)	Studio(s)	Notes
2011	The Adjustment Bureau	George Nolfi	Media Rights Capital; Universal Pictures	Soundtrack released by Relativity Music Group
2011	The Help	Tate Taylor	Reliance Entertainment; Participant Media; Image Nation; 1492 Pictures; Touchstone Pictures; DreamWorks Pictures	Score album released by Varèse Sarabande
2011	The Debt	John Madden	Marv Films; Miramax Films; Focus Features (US); Universal Pictures (International)	Soundtrack released by Relativity Music Group, Silva Screen Music
2011	The Iron Lady	Phyllida Lloyd	Pathé; Film4; UK Film Council; Canal+ Goldcrest Films; The Weinstein Company (US); 20th Century Fox (UK)	Soundtrack released by Sony Classical
2012	The Best Exotic Marigold Hotel	John Madden	Participant Media; Blueprint Pictures; Fox Searchlight Pictures	Soundtrack released by Sony Classical
2012	Skyfall	Sam Mendes	Eon Productions; Metro-Goldwyn-Mayer; Columbia Pictures	Soundtrack released by Sony Classical
2013	Side Effects	Steven Soderbergh	FilmNation Entertainment; Open Road Films	Soundtrack released by Varèse Sarabande
2013	Saving Mr. Banks	John Lee Hancock	Walt Disney Pictures; BBC Films; Essential Media Entertainment	Soundtrack released by Walt Disney Records
2014	Get On Up	Tate Taylor	Imagine Entertainment; Universal Pictures	—N/a
2014	The Judge	David Dobkin	Village Roadshow Pictures; Warner Bros.	Soundtrack released by WaterTower Music
2015	The Second Best Exotic Marigold Hotel	John Madden	Participant Media; Blueprint Pictures; Fox Searchlight Pictures	—N/a
2015	He Named Me Malala	Davis Guggenheim	Image Nation Abu Dhabi FZ; Participant Media	Soundtrack released by Sony Classical
2015	Bridge of Spies	Steven Spielberg	Touchstone Pictures; DreamWorks Pictures; 20th Century Fox	Replaced John Williams; First Steven Spielberg theatrical film without his long-time composer John Williams since The Color Purple (1985)
2015	Spectre	Sam Mendes	Metro-Goldwyn-Mayer; Columbia Pictures	Soundtrack released by Decca Records
2016	Finding Dory	Andrew Stanton	Walt Disney Pictures; Pixar Animation Studios	—N/a
2016	Passengers	Morten Tyldum	Columbia Pictures; Village Roadshow Pictures	—N/a
2017	Victoria & Abdul	Stephen Frears	Focus Features; Working Title Films	—N/a
2017	Thank You for Your Service	Jason Hall	Universal Pictures; DreamWorks Pictures	—N/a
2019	The Highwaymen	John Lee Hancock	Casey Silver Productions; Netflix	—N/a
2019	Tolkien	Dome Karukoski	Chernin Entertainment; Fox Searchlight Pictures	—N/a
2019	1917	Sam Mendes	Amblin Partners; Universal Pictures	—N/a

==== 2020s ====
Year	Title	Director(s)	Studio(s)	Notes
2020	Let Them All Talk	Steven Soderbergh	HBO Max	—N/a
2021	The Little Things	John Lee Hancock	Warner Bros. Pictures	—N/a
2021	Operation Mincemeat	John Madden	FilmNation Entertainment; Netflix	—N/a
2022	Dog	Channing Tatum; Reid Carolin	FilmNation Entertainment; Metro-Goldwyn-Mayer; United Artists Releasing	—N/a
2022	A Man Called Otto	Marc Forster	Columbia Pictures; Stage 6 Films; SF Studios; Playtone; Artistic Films	—N/a
2023	Elemental	Peter Sohn	Walt Disney Pictures; Pixar Animation Studios	—N/a
2024	White Bird	Marc Forster	Lionsgate; Mandeville Films; Participant Media	—N/a
2025	The Thursday Murder Club	Chris Columbus	Amblin Entertainment; Jennifer Todd Pictures; Maiden Voyage Pictures; Netflix	—N/a
2026	In the Blink of an Eye	Andrew Stanton	Searchlight Pictures; Mighty Engine	—N/a

=== Television ===
Year	Title	Notes
1979	The Paper Chase	"A Case Of Detente" (season 1, episode 21)
1987	Amazing Stories	Episode "Santa '85." Soundtrack released by Intrada
1989	Rhythm Nation 1814	Incidental score
1990	Heat Wave	
1992	Those Secrets	Soundtrack released by Masters Film Music
1992	Citizen Cohn	
2000	Boston Public	Main title theme
2001	Six Feet Under	Main title theme
2003	Angels in America	Soundtrack released by Nonesuch
2012	The Newsroom	Main theme and pilot
2017	Five Came Back	Main theme
2018	Castle Rock	Main theme and six episodes
2024	Feud: Capote vs. The Swans	Main Title Theme
2024	Monsters: The Lyle and Erik Menendez Story	Co-composed with Julia Newman

== Additional soundtracks and music ==
- 2001: Hearts in Atlantis (Trailer) (from How to Make an American Quilt)
- 2003: Finding Nemo (Teaser Trailer) (from Scent of a Woman)
- 2005: Brokeback Mountain (Trailer) (from The Shawshank Redemption)
- 2005: Corpse Bride (Trailer) (from Lemony Snicket's A Series of Unfortunate Events)
- 2005: Madagascar (from American Beauty)
- 2005: Fun with Dick and Jane (from Lemony Snicket's A Series of Unfortunate Events)
- 2006: Eight Below (Trailer) (from Finding Nemo)
- 2007: Sicko (from Little Children, Lemony Snicket's A Series of Unfortunate Events and In the Bedroom)
- 2007: No Reservations (Trailer) (from Lemony Snicket's A Series of Unfortunate Events and American Beauty)
- 2009: Bigfoot (Trailer) (from WALL-E)
- 2010: Alice in Wonderland (Teaser Trailer) (from Lemony Snicket's A Series of Unfortunate Events)

Newman has also composed music for television, including theme music for the series Boston Public and the miniseries Angels in America. His theme music for the television show Six Feet Under won two Grammy Awards in 2003, for Best Instrumental Composition as well as Best Instrumental Arrangement. He also wrote the theme for the HBO series Newsroom.

Newman also wrote a commissioned concert work for orchestra, Reach Forth Our Hands, for the 1996 Cleveland Bicentennial. The Los Angeles Philharmonic commissioned an orchestral work by Newman, It Got Dark, which was performed by the Kronos Quartet and Los Angeles Philharmonic and conducted by Leonard Slatkin during the orchestra's 2009–2010 season.

He composed the incidental music for the Washington Shakespeare Theatre Company's 2014 production of As You Like It, directed by Michael Attenborough and starring Zoe Waites.

He also collaborated with composer and multi-instrumentalist Rick Cox in an electro-acoustic album 35 Whirlpools Below Sound; which is released under the label Cold Blue Music in 2014.
