= Scott Ferguson =

Scott Ferguson may refer to:

- Scott Ferguson (ice hockey), Canadian ice hockey player
- Scott Ferguson (producer), American television and film producer
