= Joshua D. Maurer =

American film producer, writer, and actor

- Born: Joshua Dwight Maurer; February 26, 1964 (age 62); New Jersey, U.S.
- Education: Sarah Lawrence College
- Occupations: Producer, Writer, Actor
- Years active: 1981–present
- Spouse: Alixandre Witlin (m. 1995)
- Children: 2

Joshua D. Maurer (born February 26, 1964) is an American film producer, writer and actor who is best known for Georgia O'Keeffe, The Hoax, The Last Tycoon, Rosemary's Baby, Jodi Arias: Dirty Little Secret, Introducing Dorothy Dandridge, And Starring Pancho Villa As Himself, The Pentagon Papers, Howards End, Papillon, and The Miracle Club.

== Early life ==
Maurer grew up in West Orange, New Jersey, where he attended West Orange High School. Maurer next attended and received his B.A. from Sarah Lawrence College in history and drama. Prior to forming his own company, Maurer began his professional career as an actor, training with Emmy winner Viveca Lindfors and Academy Award winner Olympia Dukakis, which led him to being hired by Olympia for her Montclair, New Jersey Whole Theatre Company's production of "HOME" written by Samm-Art Williams and starring Samuel L. Jackson and S. Epatha Merkerson.

== Career ==
After graduation, Maurer first appeared as a series lead in the CBS critically acclaimed Vietnam War television series Tour of Duty, portraying the conscientious objector "Private Roger Horn." He later went on to star in a number of television movies, starring opposite Valerie Bertinelli in CBS's Taken Away as well as the motion picture Gettysburg, directed by Ron Maxwell, as Colonel James C. Rice.

Maurer was nominated twice within the same year and category for the David L. Wolper Producer of the Year Award for Longform Television.

Maurer is a member of the Screen Actors Guild, the Writers Guild of America, the Producers Guild, as well as the Academy of Television Arts and Sciences.

Joshua is married to Alixandre Witlin, with whom he shares two daughters, Sofia and Honor Maurer.

== Awards and nominations ==
Year	Award	Category	Work	Result
2000	Emmy Award	Outstanding Made for Television Movie	Introducing Dorothy Dandridge	Nominated
2000	Columbus International Film & Animation Festival	Bronze Plaque Award (Entertainment)	Introducing Dorothy Dandridge	Won
2000	Black Reel Awards	Best Television Miniseries or Movie	Introducing Dorothy Dandridge	Won
2000	Satellite Awards	Best Motion Picture Made for Television	Introducing Dorothy Dandridge	Nominated
2000	Golden Globes Awards	Best Miniseries or Motion Picture Made for Television	Introducing Dorothy Dandridge	Nominated
2000	NAMIC Vision Awards	Drama	Introducing Dorothy Dandridge	Won
2000	Prism Awards	TV Movie, Miniseries or Dramatic Special	Introducing Dorothy Dandridge	Won
2000	NAACP Image Awards	Outstanding Television Movie, Mini-Series or Dramatic Special	Introducing Dorothy Dandridge	Won
2004	Imagen Awards	Best Movie for Television	And Starring Pancho Villa as Himself	Won
2004	Critics' Choice Awards	Best Picture Made for Television	And Starring Pancho Villa as Himself	Nominated
2004	Producers Guild of America Awards	David L. Wolper Award for Outstanding Producer of Long-Form Television	And Starring Pancho Villa as Himself	Nominated
2004	Emmy Award	Outstanding Made for Television Movie	And Starring Pancho Villa as Himself	Nominated
2010	Emmy Award	Outstanding Made for Television Movie	Georgia O'Keeffe	Nominated
2004	Producers Guild of America	Outstanding Producer of Long-Form Television	And Starring Pancho Villa as Himself	Nominated
2004	Producers Guild of America	Outstanding Producer of Long-Form Television	The Pentagon Papers	Nominated
2010	Golden Globe Awards	Best Miniseries or Television Film	Georgia O'Keeffe	Nominated
2010	NAACP Image Awards	Outstanding Television Movie, Mini-Series or Dramatic Special	Georgia O'Keeffe	Nominated
2017	Bafta Awards	Outstanding Television Movie	Howards End (2018)	Nominated
2010	Producers Guild of America	Producer	Georgia O'Keeffe	Won

== Filmography ==
Year	Title	Role	Notes
1987-1988	Tour of Duty	Actor - 21 Episodes	TV Series
1989	Taken Away	Actor	TV Movie
1993	Gettysburg	Actor	TV Movie
1997	Dead Men Can't Dance	Executive Producer	TV Movie
1999	Introducing Dorothy Dandridge	Executive Producer	TV Movie
2001	Dodson's Journey	Executive Producer	TV Movie
2003	The Pentagon Papers	Executive Producer	TV Movie
2003	And Starring Pancho Villa as Himself	Executive Producer	TV Movie
2006	The Hoax	Producer	Film
2009	Georgia O'Keeffe	Executive Producer	TV movie
2010	Rubicon	Executive Producer - Gone in the Teeth Episode	TV series
2013	Jodi Arias: Dirty Little Secret	Executive Producer	TV movie
2014	Rosemary's Baby	Executive Producer - Nights One and Two	TV mini-series
2016	The Last Tycoon	Executive Producer - Nine Episodes	TV series
2017	Papillon	Executive Producer	Film
2017	Howards End	Executive Producer - Four Episodes	TV mini-series
2018	I Feel Bad	Executive Producer - Thirteen Episodes	TV series
2023	The Miracle Club	Writer, Producer	Film
