= Verisimilitude (disambiguation) =

Verisimilitude is the resemblance to reality, or the property of seeming true.

It may refer to:

- Verisimilitude (fiction), the appearance of reality in literature and theater
- "Verisimilitude", a track by Thomas Newman from Lemony Snicket's A Series of Unfortunate Events (soundtrack)
- "Verisimilitude", a song on Grand Prix (album) by Teenage Fanclub
