= Celia D. Costas =

American film producer

Celia D. Costas is a film producer. She won two Emmy Awards for the HBO miniseries Angels in America and the television film Warm Springs and was nominated for a third Emmy Award for the television film For Love or Country: The Arturo Sandoval Story. She has also received a Producers Guild of America Award for Angels in America. She is a member of the advisory board of the Feirstein Graduate School of Cinema at Brooklyn College.

== Filmography ==
Year	Title	Role	Notes
1978	Slow Dancing in the Big City	Production assistant	
1980	No Nukes	Production assistant - Madison Square Garden	
1981	Nighthawks	Production assistant	
1981	Rollover	Location coordinator	
1982	Sophie's Choice	Location manager	
1984	The Cotton Club	Special effects unit location manager	
1985	Sweet Liberty	Location manager	
1985	The Ultimate Solution of Grace Quigley	Location manager	
1986	Dream Lover	New York location manager	
1987	Someone to Watch Over Me	New York location manager	
1987	Wall Street	Location manager	
1987	Orphans	Location manager	
1991	Frankie and Johnny	New York production manager	
1991	Deceived	New York unit production manager	
1992	Glengarry Glen Ross	Unit production manager	
1992	Consenting Adults	Unit production manager	
1993	The Pelican Brief	Unit production manager	
1995	To Woo Fong Thanks for Everything, Julie Newmar	Unit production manager	
1996	Night Falls on Manhattan	Unit production manager	
1997	Private Parts	Co-producer, Unit production manager	
1998	Meet Joe Black	Associate producer, Unit production manager	
1999	A Lesson Before Dying	Co-producer	Television film
1999	Sleepy Hollow	New York unit line producer	
2000	28 Days	Co-producer, Unit production manager	
2000	For Love or Country: The Arturo Sandoval Story	Producer	Television film
2001	Zoolander	Co-producer, Unit production manager	
2003	Angels in America	Producer	Miniseries
2004	Closer	Executive producer, Unit production manager	
2005	Warm Springs	Executive producer	Television film
2007	Charlie Wilson's War	Executive producer	
2008	Che	New York unit line producer	
2008	Doubt	Executive producer, Unit production manager	
2009	Taking Woodstock	Producer, Unit production manager	
2010	Wall Street: Money Never Sleeps	Executive producer	
2011	Extremely Loud and Incredibly Close	Executive producer	
2013	August: Osage County	Executive producer	
2014	Annie	Executive producer	
2015	The Intern	Executive producer	
2016	The Girl on the Train	Executive producer	
2018	A Quiet Place	Executive producer	

== Awards ==
Year	Award	Category	Result	Work	Ref.
2001	Primetime Emmy Award	Outstanding Television Movie	Nominated	For Love or Country: The Arturo Sandoval Story	
2004	Primetime Emmy Award	Outstanding Miniseries	Won	Angels in America	
2005	Producers Guild of America Award	Outstanding Producer of Long-Form Television	Won	Angels in America	
2005	Primetime Emmy Award	Outstanding Television Movie	Won	Warm Springs	
2006	Producers Guild of America Award	Outstanding Producer of Long-Form Television	Nominated	Warm Springs	
