= Angels in America (miniseries) =

2003 HBO miniseries based on the play of the same name

- DVD cover
- Based on: Angels in America by Tony Kushner
- Written by: Tony Kushner
- Directed by: Mike Nichols
- Starring: Al Pacino; Meryl Streep; Patrick Wilson; Mary-Louise Parker; Emma Thompson; Justin Kirk; Jeffrey Wright; Ben Shenkman
- Theme music composer: Thomas Newman
- Country of origin: United States
- Original language: English
- No. of episodes: 6

Production
- Producer: Celia D. Costas
- Cinematography: Stephen Goldblatt
- Editors: John Bloom; Antonia Van Drimmelen
- Running time: 352 minutes
- Production companies: Avenue Pictures; HBO Films
- Budget: $60 million

Original release
- Network: HBO
- Release: December 7 – December 14, 2003

Angels in America is a 2003 American miniseries directed by Mike Nichols and based on the Pulitzer Prize–winning 1991 play of the same name by Tony Kushner. Set in 1985, the miniseries revolves around six New Yorkers whose lives intersect. At its core, it is the fantastical story of Prior Walter, a gay man living with AIDS who is visited by an angel. The miniseries explores a wide variety of themes, including Reagan era politics, the spreading AIDS epidemic, and a rapidly changing social and political climate.

HBO broadcast the film in various formats: two three-hour chunks that correspond to Millennium Approaches and Perestroika, further divided into six one-hour "chapters" that roughly correspond to an act or two of each of these plays; the first three chapters ("Bad News", "In Vitro", and "The Messenger") were initially broadcast on December 7, 2003, to international acclaim, with the final three chapters ("Stop Moving!", "Beyond Nelly", and "Heaven, I'm in Heaven") following.

Angels in America was the most-watched made-for-cable film in 2003, and earned much critical acclaim and numerous accolades: at the 56th Primetime Emmy Awards, it became the first of only three programs in Emmy history (along with Schitt's Creek in 2020, and The Crown in 2021) to sweep every major eligible category, and won all four acting categories. It also won in all five eligible categories at the 61st Golden Globe Awards. In 2006, The Seattle Times listed the series among "Best of the filmed AIDS portrayals" on the occasion of the 25th anniversary of AIDS.

== Plot ==
=== Millennium Approaches ===
It is 1985, Ronald Reagan is in the White House, and AIDS is causing mass death in the Americas. In Manhattan, Prior Walter tells Louis, his lover of four years, that he has AIDS; Louis, unable to handle it, leaves him. As disease and loneliness ravage Prior, guilt invades Louis. Joe Pitt, a Mormon and Republican attorney, is pushed by right-wing fixer Roy Cohn toward a job at the US Department of Justice. Both Pitt and Cohn are in the closet: Pitt out of shame and religious turmoil, Cohn to preserve his power and image. Pitt's wife Harper is strung out on Valium, causing her to hallucinate constantly (sometimes jointly with Prior during his fever dreams) and she longs to escape from her sexless marriage. An angel with ulterior motives commands Prior to become a prophet.

=== Perestroika ===
Prior is helped in his decision by Joe's mother, Hannah, and Belize, a close friend and drag queen. Joe leaves his wife and goes to live with Louis, but the relationship does not work out because of ideological differences. Roy is diagnosed with AIDS early on and, as his life comes to a close, he is haunted by the ghost of Ethel Rosenberg. As the film continues, the lost souls come together to create bonds of love, loss, and loneliness and, in the end, discover forgiveness and overcome abandonment.

== Episodes ==
No.	Title	Directed by	Written by	Original release date	U.S. viewers (millions)
1	"Millennium Approaches: Chapter One – Bad News"	Mike Nichols	Tony Kushner	December 7, 2003	N/A
In October 1985 in New York City, Louis Ironson learns that his lover, Prior Walter, has AIDS after Prior discovers a lesion on his body. Although Louis promises to stay with him, he becomes increasingly frightened by the disease and emotionally overwhelmed. Conservative Mormon lawyer Joe Pitt is offered a prestigious Justice Department position in Washington, D.C. by the influential attorney Roy Cohn, who privately learns that he has AIDS but furiously rejects being identified as homosexual. Joe’s wife Harper, addicted to Valium and suffering from paranoia and hallucinations, begins suspecting that her husband is hiding his sexuality from her. During one of her hallucinations, Harper encounters Prior in a shared dream despite never having met him. Elsewhere, tensions continue growing between Prior and Louis as Prior’s condition gradually worsens.
2	"Millennium Approaches: Chapter Two – In Vitro"	Mike Nichols	Tony Kushner	December 7, 2003	N/A
Prior is taken to the hospital and he begins hearing mysterious voices foretelling the arrival of a supernatural messenger. Unable to emotionally cope with Prior’s illness, Louis leaves him alone in the hospital, where Belize, a former drag queen and Prior’s closest friend, helps care for him. After meeting Joe at a bar, Roy privately confesses that he is dying from AIDS, though he angrily refuses to identify himself as gay. Torn by pressure from Roy and a burgeoning infatuation with Louis, Joe drunkenly telephones his mother Hannah in Salt Lake City and indirectly confesses that he is homosexual, concerning her. Harper retreats further into hallucinations with her imaginary travel guide Mr. Lies. Louis finally abandons Prior in the hospital, unable to handle the emotional burden of watching him deteriorate from AIDS.
3	"Millennium Approaches: Chapter Three – The Messenger"	Mike Nichols	Tony Kushner	December 7, 2003	N/A
Joe admits to Harper that he is homosexual, devastating their marriage, and Harper hallucinates traveling to Antarctica through her refrigerator alongside Mr. Lies. After Joe decides to refuse the Washington job offer, Roy flies into a furious rage before collapsing in pain and hallucinating the ghost of Ethel Rosenberg, whose execution he helped orchestrate in the 1950s. Louis and Joe grow closer after meeting again in Central Park, where they share a kiss that marks the beginning of their affair. Meanwhile, Prior suffers increasingly intense feverish visions involving his ancestors, who warn him about an approaching revelation. Then, a massive Angel crashes through the ceiling of Prior’s apartment and proclaims him a prophet chosen to deliver a message to humanity.
4	"Perestroika: Chapter Four – Stop Moving!"	Mike Nichols	Tony Kushner	December 14, 2003	N/A
By January 1986, Prior struggles to understand the Angel’s command that humanity must stop moving and changing in order to restore Heaven’s stability. Belize continues caring for Prior while criticizing Louis for abandoning him. Louis becomes disturbed by Joe’s conservative political beliefs and Mormon worldview. Harper, now isolated and unstable, wanders through Brooklyn and contemplates escaping her unhappy life entirely. Roy ends up hospitalized as his condition rapidly declines. Meanwhile, Hannah arrives in New York and struggles to adapt to the unfamiliar city while trying to reconnect with Joe.
5	"Perestroika: Chapter Five – Beyond Nelly"	Mike Nichols	Tony Kushner	December 14, 2003	N/A
Louis and Joe’s relationship becomes increasingly strained as Louis remains consumed by guilt over leaving Prior. Prior, recovering physically but emotionally scarred, begins resisting the Angel’s demands and searches for meaning in his visions. Harper decides to leave New York and start over elsewhere, finally recognizing that her sexless marriage to Joe cannot survive. Hannah unexpectedly forms friendships with Prior and Belize after helping care for Prior at the Mormon Visitor Center. Roy desperately uses his political connections to illegally obtain AZT medication while his health deteriorates further, and Belize secretly takes some of Roy’s medication to help Prior survive.
6	"Perestroika: Chapter Six – Heaven, I'm in Heaven"	Mike Nichols	Tony Kushner	December 14, 2003	N/A
Prior journeys to Heaven in a vision and confronts the Angel Council, rejecting their demand that humanity cease progressing and changing. He instead chooses to continue living despite pain, uncertainty, and suffering. Louis confesses his guilt to Prior and unsuccessfully attempts reconciliation, while Joe and Louis separate after realizing their relationship cannot survive their personal and political differences. In February, Roy dies in the hospital as Belize and the ghost of Ethel Rosenberg recite the Kaddish for him, granting him an unexpected moment of dignity. In January 1990, Prior, Louis, Belize, and Hannah reunite near the Bethesda Fountain in Central Park and look toward the future with cautious hope amid the AIDS crisis.

== Cast ==
- Al Pacino as Roy Cohn
- Meryl Streep as Hannah Pitt / Ethel Rosenberg / Rabbi Isidor Chemelwitz / The Angel Australia
- Patrick Wilson as Joe Pitt
- Mary-Louise Parker as Harper Pitt
- Emma Thompson as Nurse Emily / Homeless woman / The Angel America
- Justin Kirk as Prior Walter / Leatherman in park
- Jeffrey Wright as Mr. Lies / Norman "Belize" Arriaga / Homeless man / The Angel Europa
- Ben Shenkman as Louis Ironson / The Angel Oceania
- Brian Markinson as Martin Heller
- James Cromwell as Henry, Roy's doctor
- Michael Gambon as Prior Walter Ancestor No. 1
- Simon Callow as Prior Walter Ancestor No. 2
- Robin Weigert as Mormon Mother

== Soundtrack ==
The soundtrack of the series by Thomas Newman was nominated for the Grammy Award for Best Score Soundtrack Album for a Motion Picture, Television or Other Visual Media.

== Production ==
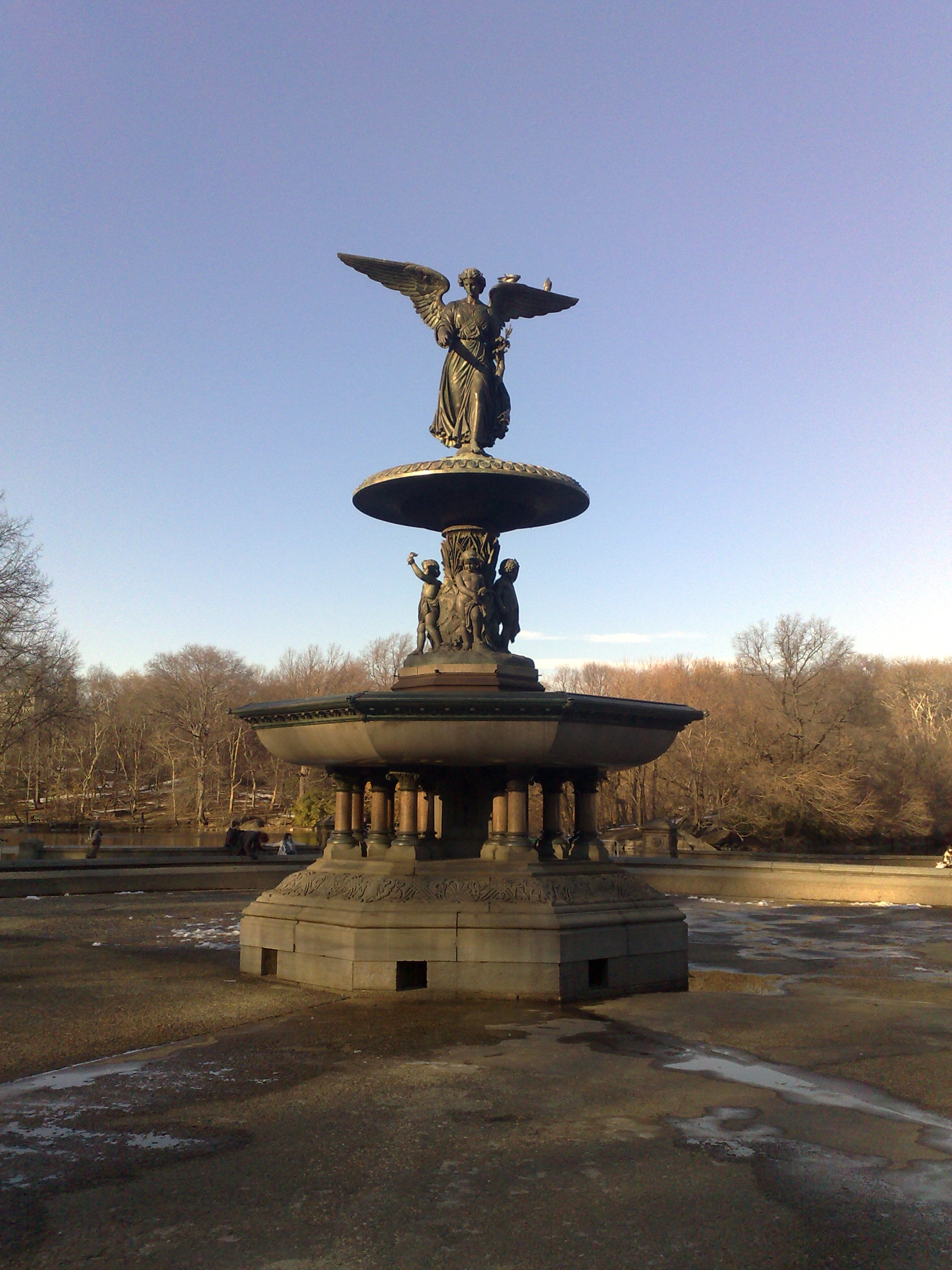
Bethesda Fountain at the Bethesda Terrace in New York City's Central Park, where many scenes were shot

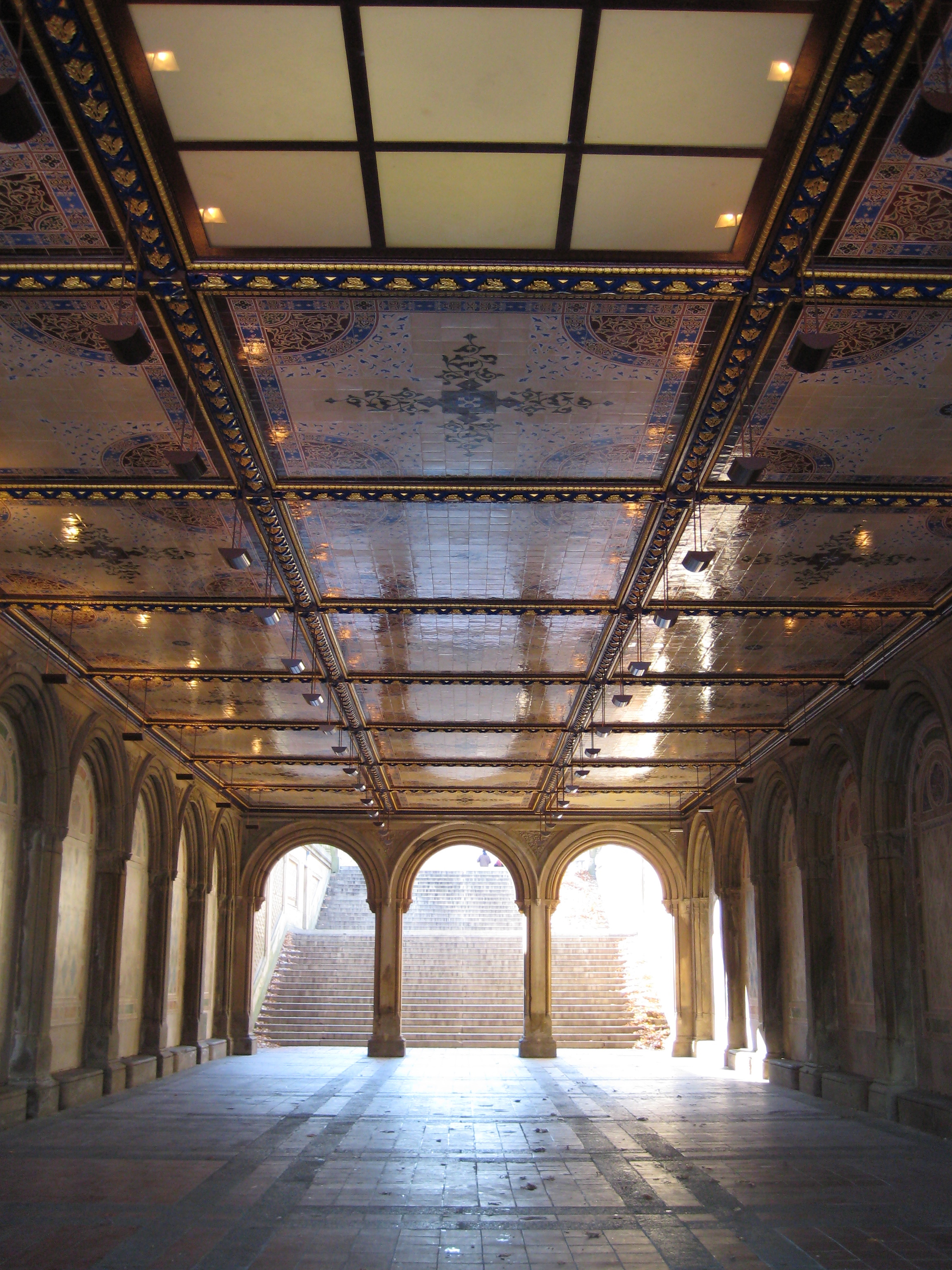
Below Bethesda Terrace, Central Park, where the final scene was shot

Cary Brokaw, executive producer of the series, worked for over ten years to bring the 1991 stage production to television, having first read it in 1989, before its first production. In 1993, Al Pacino committed to playing the role of Roy Cohn. In the meantime, a number of directors, including Robert Altman, were part of the project. Altman worked on the project in 1993 and 1994, before budget constraints forced him to move out, as few studios could risk producing two successive 150-minute movies at the cost of $40 million. Subsequently, Kushner tried squeezing the play into a feature film, at which he eventually failed, realizing there was "literally too much plot," and settling for the TV miniseries format. While Kushner continued adapting the play until the late 1990s, HBO Films stepped in as producer, allocating a budget of $60 million.

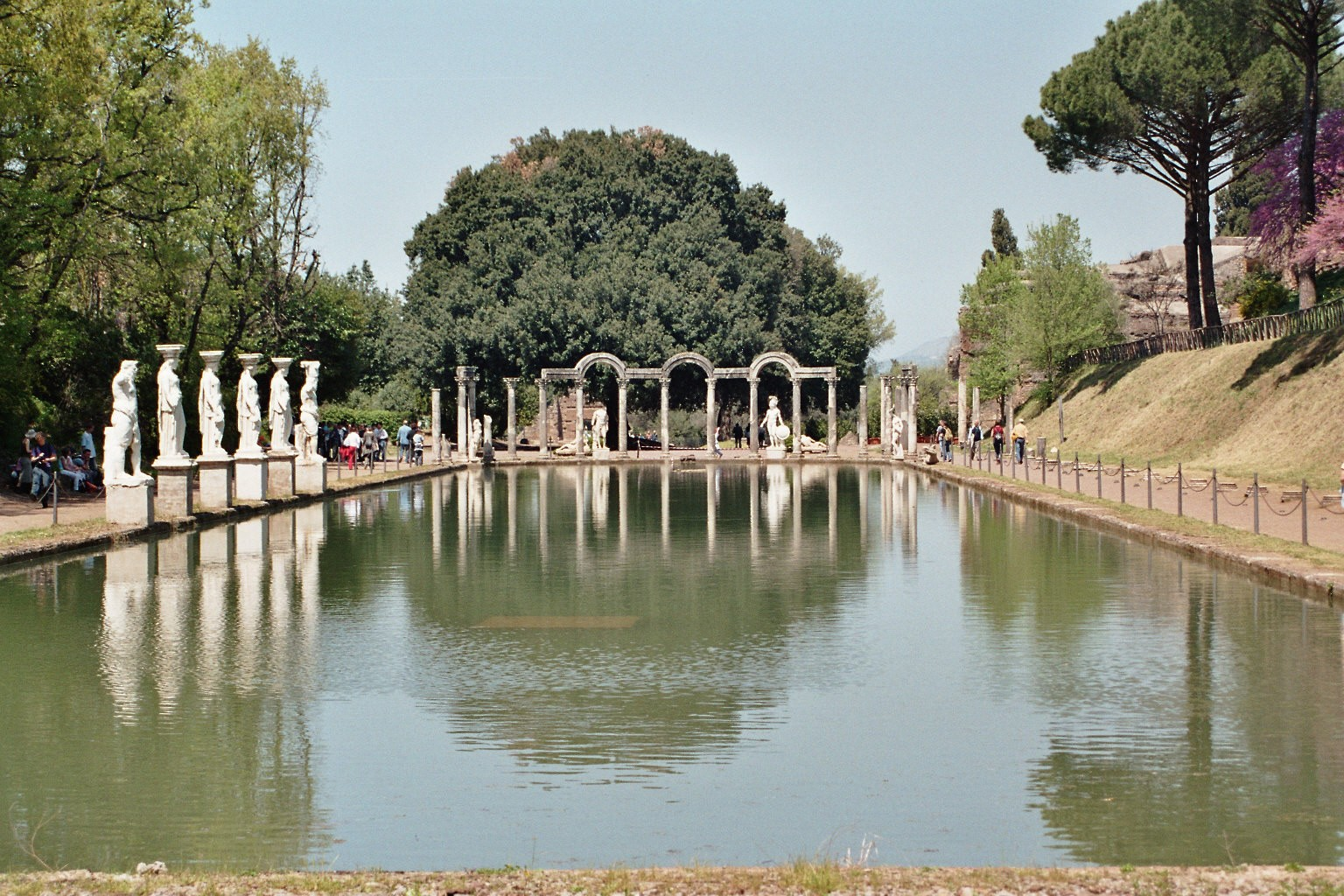
Canopus of Hadrian's Villa, where the heaven sequence was shot

Brokaw gave Mike Nichols the script while he was working with him on Wit (2001) starring Emma Thompson, who also co-adapted the play of the same title. The principal cast, including Meryl Streep, Pacino, and Thompson, having recently worked with Nichols, was immediately assembled by him. Though Ben Shenkman had previously portrayed Louis in the San Francisco A.C.T.'s production (as well as portraying Roy Cohn in the NYU graduate acting program's workshop of Perestroika prior to its Broadway opening), Jeffrey Wright was the only original cast member to appear in the Broadway version, having won the 1994 Tony Award for Best Performance by a Featured Actor for his stage performance. The shooting started in May 2002, and after a 137-day schedule, ended in January 2003. Filming was done primarily at Kaufman Astoria Studios, New York City, with several pivotal scenes being shot on the streets of the city and at Bethesda Fountain in Central Park. The Heaven sequence was shot at Hadrian's Villa, the Roman archaeological complex at Tivoli, Italy, dating early 2nd century.

Special effects in the series were by Richard Edlund (Star Wars trilogy), who created the two important Angel visitation sequences, as well as the opening sequence wherein the angel at the Bethesda Fountain opens its eyes in the end, signifying her "coming to life". Costumer Martin Izquierdo was hired to design functioning wings for Thompson's Angel.

== Reception ==
Review aggregator Rotten Tomatoes gave the series a 92% rating based on 24 reviews, with an average rating of 9.5/10. The critical consensus reads: "In Angels of America, writer Tony Kushner and director Mike Nichols imaginatively and artistically deliver heavy, vital subject matter, colorfully imparted by a stellar cast." The New York Times wrote that "Mike Nichols's television version is a work of art in itself." According to a Boston Globe review, "director Mike Nichols, and a magnificent cast led by Meryl Streep have pulled a spellbinding and revelatory TV movie out of the Tony- and Pulitzer Prize-winning work" and that he "managed to make Angels in America thrive onscreen...".

IndieWire ranked the series first on its list of best LGBTQ TV shows of the 21st century.

== Awards and nominations ==
In 2004, Angels in America broke the record previously held by Roots for the most Primetime Emmy Awards given to a miniseries in a single year by winning 11 awards from 21 nominations. Angels in America became the first of only three programs (following by Schitt's Creek in comedy at the 72nd Emmy Awards and The Crown in drama at the 73rd Emmy Awards) to sweep every major category in Emmy history. It also joined Caesar's Hour, in 1957, as the only series to win all four main acting categories in one night.

Along with television miniseries Eleanor and Franklin, the series became one of the two most-honored programs in television history. The record was broken four years later by John Adams at the 60th Primetime Emmy Awards, which won 13 trophies from 23 nominations.

Year	Award	Category	Nominee(s)	Result	Ref.
2003	Costume Designers Guild Awards	Outstanding Period/Fantasy Television Series	Ann Roth	Nominated	
2003	National Board of Review Awards	Best Film Made for Cable TV	Angels in America	Won	
2004	AARP Movies for Grownups Awards	Best TV Movie	Angels in America	Won	
2004	American Film Institute Awards	Top 10 TV Programs of the Year	Angels in America	Won	
2004	American Society of Cinematographers Awards	Outstanding Achievement in Cinematography in Movies of the Week, Mini-Series or Pilot (Cable)	Stephen Goldblatt	Nominated	
2004	Art Directors Guild Awards	Excellence in Production Design Award – Television Movie or Mini-Series	Stuart Wurtzel, John Kasarda, Stefano Maria Ortolani, Hinju Kim, David Stein, and Tom Warren	Won	
2004	Critics' Choice Awards	Best Picture Made for Television	Angels in America	Won	
2004	Directors Guild of America Awards	Outstanding Directorial Achievement in Movies for Television	Mike Nichols	Won	
2004	GLAAD Media Awards	Outstanding Television Movie or Mini-Series	Angels in America	Won	
2004	Golden Globe Awards	Best Miniseries or Motion Picture Made for Television	Angels in America	Won	
2004	Golden Globe Awards	Best Actor – Miniseries or Motion Picture Made for Television	Al Pacino	Won	
2004	Golden Globe Awards	Best Actress – Miniseries or Motion Picture Made for Television	Meryl Streep	Won	
2004	Golden Globe Awards	Best Supporting Actor – Series, Miniseries or Motion Picture Made for Television	Ben Shenkman	Nominated	
2004	Golden Globe Awards	Best Supporting Actor – Series, Miniseries or Motion Picture Made for Television	Patrick Wilson	Nominated	
2004	Golden Globe Awards	Best Supporting Actor – Series, Miniseries or Motion Picture Made for Television	Jeffrey Wright	Won	
2004	Golden Globe Awards	Best Supporting Actress – Series, Miniseries or Motion Picture Made for Television	Mary-Louise Parker	Won	
2004	Humanitas Prize	90 Minute or Longer Network or Syndicated Television	Tony Kushner	Won	
2004	Primetime Emmy Awards	Outstanding Miniseries	Cary Brokaw, Celia D. Costas, Mike Haley, and Mike Nichols	Won	
2004	Primetime Emmy Awards	Outstanding Lead Actor in a Miniseries or a Movie	Al Pacino	Won	
2004	Primetime Emmy Awards	Outstanding Lead Actress in a Miniseries or a Movie	Meryl Streep	Won	
2004	Primetime Emmy Awards	Outstanding Lead Actress in a Miniseries or a Movie	Emma Thompson	Nominated	
2004	Primetime Emmy Awards	Outstanding Supporting Actor in a Miniseries or a Movie	Justin Kirk	Nominated	
2004	Primetime Emmy Awards	Outstanding Supporting Actor in a Miniseries or a Movie	Ben Shenkman	Nominated	
2004	Primetime Emmy Awards	Outstanding Supporting Actor in a Miniseries or a Movie	Patrick Wilson	Nominated	
2004	Primetime Emmy Awards	Outstanding Supporting Actor in a Miniseries or a Movie	Jeffrey Wright	Won	
2004	Primetime Emmy Awards	Outstanding Supporting Actress in a Miniseries or a Movie	Mary-Louise Parker	Won	
2004	Primetime Emmy Awards	Outstanding Directing for a Miniseries, Movie or a Dramatic Special	Mike Nichols	Won	
2004	Primetime Emmy Awards	Outstanding Writing for a Miniseries, Movie or a Dramatic Special	Tony Kushner	Won	
2004	Primetime Emmy Awards	Outstanding Art Direction for a Miniseries or Movie	Stuart Wurtzel, John Kasarda, and George DeTitta Jr. (for "Millennium Approaches", "Perestroika").	Won	
2004	Primetime Emmy Awards	Outstanding Casting for a Miniseries, Movie or a Special	Juliet Taylor and Ellen Lewis	Won	
2004	Primetime Emmy Awards	Outstanding Cinematography for a Miniseries or Movie	Stephen Goldblatt (for "Perestroika")	Nominated	
2004	Primetime Emmy Awards	Outstanding Costumes for a Miniseries, Movie or a Special	Ann Roth, Michelle Matland, and Donna Maloney (for "Perestroika")	Nominated	
2004	Primetime Emmy Awards	Outstanding Hairstyling for a Miniseries, Movie or a Special	David Brian Brown, Jasen Joseph Sica, and Angel De Angelis (for Millennium Approaches", "Perestroika")	Nominated	
2004	Primetime Emmy Awards	Outstanding Main Title Design	Randall Balsmeyer, J. John Corbett, Jim Rider, and Amit Sethi	Nominated	
2004	Primetime Emmy Awards	Outstanding Makeup for a Miniseries, Movie or a Special (Non-Prosthetic)	J. Roy Helland, Joseph A. Campayno, John Caglione Jr., and Kelly Gleason (for "Millennium Approaches", "Perestroika")	Won	
2004	Primetime Emmy Awards	Outstanding Single-Camera Picture Editing for a Miniseries, Movie or a Special	John Bloom and Antonia Van Drimmelen (for "Millennium Approaches")	Nominated	
2004	Primetime Emmy Awards	Outstanding Single-Camera Sound Mixing for a Miniseries or a Movie	Lee Dichter, Ron Bochar, and James Sabat (for "Perestroika")	Won	
2004	Primetime Emmy Awards	Outstanding Special Visual Effects for a Miniseries, Movie or a Special	Richard Edlund, Ron Simonson, Liz Ralston, Stefano Trivelli, Don Greenberg, Lawrence Littleton, Michele Moen, Steven Kirshoff, and Gregory Jein (for "Perestroika")	Nominated	
2004	Producers Guild of America Awards	Visionary Award	Mike Nichols and Cary Brokaw	Won	
2004	Satellite Awards	Best Miniseries	Angels in America	Won	
2004	Satellite Awards	Best Actor – Miniseries or Television Film	Al Pacino	Nominated	
2004	Satellite Awards	Best Actress – Miniseries or Television Film	Meryl Streep	Won	
2004	Satellite Awards	Best Supporting Actor – Series, Miniseries or Television Film	Justin Kirk	Won	
2004	Satellite Awards	Best Supporting Actor – Series, Miniseries or Television Film	Patrick Wilson	Nominated	
2004	Satellite Awards	Best Supporting Actor – Series, Miniseries or Television Film	Jeffrey Wright	Nominated	
2004	Satellite Awards	Best Supporting Actress – Series, Miniseries or Television Film	Mary-Louise Parker	Nominated	
2004	Satellite Awards	Best Supporting Actress – Series, Miniseries or Television Film	Emma Thompson	Nominated	
2004	Actors Awards	Outstanding Performance by a Male Actor in a Miniseries or Television Movie	Al Pacino	Won	
2004	Actors Awards	Outstanding Performance by a Male Actor in a Miniseries or Television Movie	Justin Kirk	Nominated	
2004	Actors Awards	Outstanding Performance by a Male Actor in a Miniseries or Television Movie	Jeffrey Wright	Nominated	
2004	Actors Awards	Outstanding Performance by a Female Actor in a Miniseries or Television Movie	Meryl Streep	Won	
2004	Actors Awards	Outstanding Performance by a Female Actor in a Miniseries or Television Movie	Mary-Louise Parker	Nominated	
2004	Actors Awards	Outstanding Performance by a Female Actor in a Miniseries or Television Movie	Emma Thompson	Nominated	
2004	Television Critics Association Awards	Program of the Year	Angels in America	Won	
2004	Television Critics Association Awards	Outstanding Achievement in Movies, Miniseries and Specials	Angels in America	Won	
2004	Television Critics Association Awards	Individual Achievement in Drama	Al Pacino	Nominated	
2005	Gracie Awards	Outstanding Entertainment Program – Drama Special	Angels in America	Won	
2005	Gracie Awards	Individual Achievement Award – Outstanding Female Lead in a Drama Special	Meryl Streep	Won	
2005	Grammy Awards	Best Score Soundtrack Album for a Motion Picture, Television or Other Visual Media	Music from the HBO Film: Angels in America – Thomas Newman	Nominated	
2005	Producers Guild of America Awards	David L. Wolper Award for Outstanding Producer of Long-Form Television	Mike Nichols, Cary Brokaw, Celia D. Costas, and Michael Haley	Won	
2005	Writers Guild of America Awards	Long Form – Adapted	Tony Kushner – Based on his play	Won	

== See also ==
- List of Primetime Emmy Awards received by HBO
