= Georgia O'Keeffe (film) =

2009 American television biopic

- Film poster
- Genre: Biography; Drama
- Written by: Michael Cristofer
- Directed by: Bob Balaban
- Starring: Joan Allen; Jeremy Irons
- Music by: Jeff Beal
- Country of origin: United States
- Original language: English

Production
- Executive producers: Joshua D. Maurer; Alixandre Witlin; Joan Allen
- Cinematography: Paul Elliott
- Editor: Kathryn Himoff
- Running time: 89 minutes

Original release
- Network: Lifetime
- Release: September 19, 2009

Georgia O'Keeffe is a 2009 American television biographical drama film, produced by City Entertainment in association with Sony Television, about noted American painter Georgia O'Keeffe and her husband, photographer Alfred Stieglitz. The film was directed by Bob Balaban, executive-produced by Joshua D. Maurer, Alixandre Witlin and Joan Allen, and line-produced by Tony Mark. Shown on Lifetime Television, it starred Joan Allen and Jeremy Irons in lead roles.

At the 2010 Primetime Emmy Awards, the film received nine nominations, including Outstanding Made for Television Movie and Outstanding Lead Actress in a Miniseries or Movie for Joan Allen. The film was also nominated for three 2009 Golden Globe Awards, including Best Miniseries or Television Movie or Miniseries, as well as receiving nominations for director by the Directors Guild of America and a Producers Guild nomination for Producer of the Year award for Outstanding Television Movie or Miniseries, and an NAACP nomination for supporting actor in a Television Movie or Miniseries. The movie earned more total nominations than in the history of Lifetime Television combined, making it the most critically acclaimed film in Lifetime's history.

== Plot ==
Georgia O'Keeffe (Joan Allen) is a young painter in the 1910s, while Alfred Stieglitz (Jeremy Irons) is New York-based photographer and art impresario, who discovers her works. Later, when O'Keeffe discovers that her works are displayed at an art gallery without her permission, she confronts Stieglitz. However, he manages to charm her, and starts their 20-year relationship. Stieglitz, 23 years senior to O'Keeffe, subsequently starts living with her and later divorces his wife to marry her. However, over the years, as O'Keeffe becomes a famous artist, their relationship deteriorates.

== Cast ==
- Joan Allen as Georgia O'Keeffe
- Jeremy Irons as Alfred Stieglitz
- Henry Simmons as Jean Toomer
- Ed Begley, Jr. as Stieglitz's brother Lee
- Tyne Daly as Mabel Dodge Luhan
- Kathleen Chalfant as Mrs. Stieglitz
- Linda Emond as "Beck" Strand Rebecca Salsbury James
- Jenny Gabrielle as Dorothy Norman
- Chad Brummett as Marsden Hartley
- Steve Corona as John Marin

== Production ==
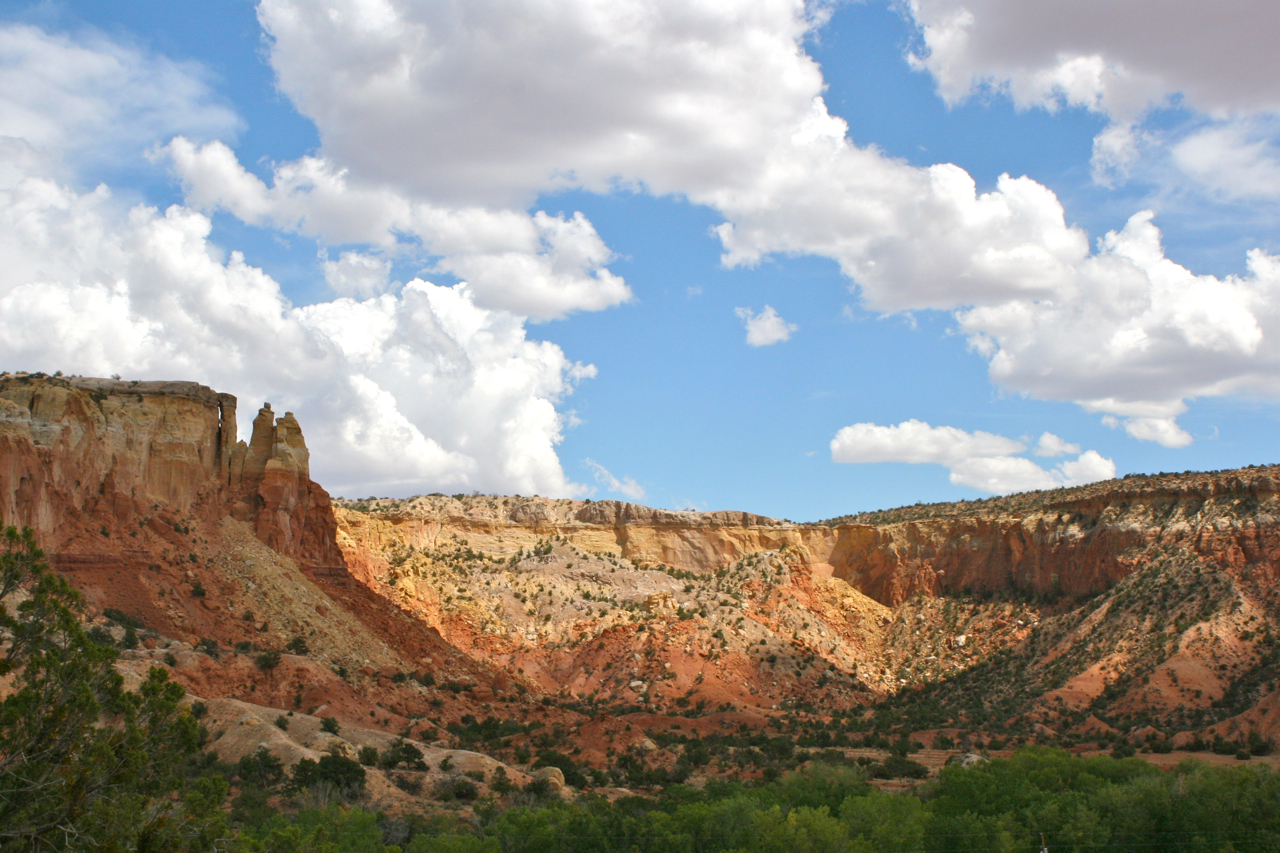
Ghost Ranch, New Mexico where part of the filming was done

=== Development and writing ===
The film was in development for four years at HBO, having been originally pitched and developed by executive producers Maurer, Witlin and Allen, and at one point it was to be produced by HBO, but eventually Lifetime took it up once HBO passed.

The film's screenplay, which was nominated and won the 2009 Writers Guild Award for Best Original Screenplay for Movie or Miniseries, was written by Pulitzer Prize winner Michael Cristofer, most known for Pulitzer Prize-winning play The Shadow Box (1977) and the 1998 film Gia .

=== Filming ===
The film was shot entirely on location in and around Santa Fe, New Mexico. The executive producers worked closely with the Georgia O'Keeffe Museum, specifically with curator and leading scholar on O'Keeffe, Barbara Buhler Lynes, to make sure issues of accuracy and content were done with sensitivity and attention to detail. Over seventy original paintings and drawings by O'Keeffe were permitted to be used in the film. Moreover, the filmmakers were given permission to film at O'Keeffe's home in Ghost Ranch, near of Abiquiú, New Mexico, the first time a film company was given that privilege. Joan Allen also took painting lessons for the film.

== Awards and nominations ==
Year	Award	Category	Nominee(s)	Result	Ref.
2009	Satellite Awards	Best Actor in a Miniseries or Motion Picture Made for Television	Jeremy Irons	Nominated	
2010	Artios Awards	Outstanding Achievement in Casting – Television Movie/Mini Series	David Rubin and Richard Hicks	Nominated	
2010	Costume Designers Guild Awards	Outstanding Made for Television Movie or Miniseries	Michael Dennison	Nominated	
2010	Directors Guild of America Awards	Outstanding Directorial Achievement in Movies for Television or Miniseries	Bob Balaban	Nominated	
2010	Golden Globe Awards	Best Miniseries or Television Film		Nominated	
2010	Golden Globe Awards	Best Actor in a Miniseries or Motion Picture Made for Television	Jeremy Irons	Nominated	
2010	Golden Globe Awards	Best Actress in a Miniseries or Motion Picture Made for Television	Joan Allen	Nominated	
2010	NAACP Image Awards	Outstanding Television Movie, Mini-Series or Dramatic Special		Nominated	
2010	Online Film & Television Association Awards	Best Actress in a Motion Picture or Miniseries	Joan Allen	Nominated	
2010	Online Film & Television Association Awards	Best Supporting Actress in a Motion Picture or Miniseries	Tyne Daly	Nominated	
2010	Online Film & Television Association Awards	Best Costume Design in a Non-Series		Nominated	
2010	Online Film & Television Association Awards	Best Makeup/Hairstyling in a Non-Series		Nominated	
2010	Online Film & Television Association Awards	Best Music in a Non-Series		Nominated	
2010	Online Film & Television Association Awards	Best Production Design in a Non-Series		Nominated	
2010	Primetime Emmy Awards	Outstanding Made for Television Movie	Joshua D. Maurer, Alixandre Witlin, Joan Allen, and Anthony Mark	Nominated	
2010	Primetime Emmy Awards	Outstanding Lead Actress in a Miniseries or a Movie	Joan Allen	Nominated	
2010	Primetime Emmy Awards	Outstanding Directing for a Miniseries, Movie or a Dramatic Special	Bob Balaban	Nominated	
2010	Primetime Creative Arts Emmy Awards	Outstanding Art Direction for a Miniseries or Movie	Stephen Altman, John Bucklin, and Helen Britten	Nominated	
2010	Primetime Creative Arts Emmy Awards	Outstanding Casting for a Miniseries, Movie or a Special	David Rubin, Richard Hicks, and Angelique Midthunder	Nominated	
2010	Primetime Creative Arts Emmy Awards	Outstanding Costumes for a Miniseries, Movie or Special	Michael Dennison and Frances Vega	Nominated	
2010	Primetime Creative Arts Emmy Awards	Outstanding Hairstyling for a Miniseries or a Movie	Enid Arias and Geordie Sheffer	Nominated	
2010	Primetime Creative Arts Emmy Awards	Outstanding Makeup for a Miniseries or a Movie (Non-Prosthetic)	Dorothy Pearl, Sheila Trujillo-Gomez, Kelley Gore Jefferson, and Tarra Day	Nominated	
2010	Primetime Creative Arts Emmy Awards	Outstanding Music Composition for a Miniseries, Movie or a Special (Original Dramatic Score)	Jeff Beal	Nominated	
2010	Producers Guild of America Awards	David L. Wolper Award for Outstanding Producer of Long-Form Television	Joshua D. Maurer, Alixandre Witlin, Joan Allen, and Anthony Mark	Nominated	
2010	Screen Actors Guild Awards	Outstanding Performance by a Male Actor in a Miniseries or Television Movie	Jeremy Irons	Nominated	
2010	Screen Actors Guild Awards	Outstanding Performance by a Female Actor in a Miniseries or Television Movie	Joan Allen	Nominated	
2010	Writers Guild of America Awards	Long Form – Original	Michael Cristofer	Won	
