= And Starring Pancho Villa as Himself =

2003 American television film by Bruce Beresford

- Genre: Western; Biographical drama
- Written by: Larry Gelbart
- Directed by: Bruce Beresford
- Starring: Antonio Banderas; Eion Bailey; Alan Arkin; Jim Broadbent
- Music by: Joseph Vitarelli
- Country of origin: United States
- Original language: English

Production
- Executive producers: Joshua D. Maurer; Mark Gordon; Larry Gelbart
- Producers: Diane Sillan Isaacs; Tony Mark; Sue Jett
- Cinematography: Peter James
- Editors: Mark Warner; Ed Warschilka
- Running time: 112 minutes
- Production companies: The Mark Gordon Company; City Entertainment
- Budget: $30 million

Original release
- Network: HBO
- Release: September 7, 2003

And Starring Pancho Villa as Himself is a 2003 American Western biographical drama television film directed by Bruce Beresford, written by Larry Gelbart, and starring Antonio Banderas as Pancho Villa. The cast also includes Alan Arkin, Jim Broadbent, Michael McKean, Eion Bailey, and Alexa Davalos. It premiered on HBO on September 7, 2003.

Executive producer Joshua D. Maurer, who originally conceived the story and did extensive research, sold the project to HBO and then brought on executive producer Mark Gordon and hired Gelbart to write the screenplay. At the time of production, this was the most expensive 2-hour television/cable film ever made, with a budget of over $30 million. It was shot almost entirely on location in and around San Miguel de Allende, Mexico.

== Plot ==
In 1923 studio executive Frank N. Thayer receives a letter in the mail with a medallion of the Virgin of Guadalupe.

Thayer then flashes back to the height of the Mexican Revolution. Pancho Villa finds himself without adequate funding to finance his war against the military-run government. Villa also finds himself at odds with the Americans because of the Hearst media empire's press campaign against him. He has a Jewish-American lieutenant of his, Sam Dreben, to send feelers to American film studios. Villa's plan is to convince them to send a film crew to film his battles. D.W. Griffith is immediately interested and convinces Mutual Film Studios boss Harry T. Aitken to send a crew. As Aitken’s nephew, Thayer is initially assigned an errand boy for the studio, but he makes a good impression with Villa; the latter then demands that Thayer be placed in charge of the project.

Thayer and a camera crew film Villa leading his men to victory in battle. Despite the failure of this initial footage (which draws derisive laughter from potential backers) Thayer convinces Aitken to invest even more money in a second attempt, and also convinces Villa to participate in making a more narrative film.

Thayer returns to Mexico with a director, actors, producers, cameramen and screenwriters, and begin to film Villa's previous exploits using a younger actor, future film director Raoul Walsh as Villa. The filming goes well, although Villa is angeded that that the screenwriters and the director have decided to use creative license to enhance the film. However, Villa is convinced to do a cameo appearance as an older version of himself. Thayer begins a romance with actress Teddy Sampson. He also is assigned two young child soldiers as editing assistants by Villa.

The next morning, Villa assembles his men to attack the Federal-held stronghold of Torreon. Thayer and his team go in to film the battle. A skirmish on the way to the fort occurs, with Villa's army repelling the Federales, though one of Thayer's assistants loses his life. Villa's army arrives at the city and lays siege. Though initially successfully, the revolutionaries suffer heavy casualties and are forced to withdraw. That night, Villa orders his army to bombard Torreon into submission. The next morning, Villa's cavalry finishes off the last of the Federal defenders. Thayer and his camera crew team film Villa shooting a widow in cold blood during the aftermath of the battle. Disgusted, the team leaves.

The Life of General Villa is shown in theaters in the U.S., and to great success, although Thayer and his crew end up regretting their participation. At the premiere, Thayer is also dismayed to find out that Teddy has broken off their romance. Nine years later, Thayer meets with Drebin in a New York restaurant with his mother. Having lost an eye and arm during the Revolution, Drebin laments at the current Mexican government being no better than Huerta's. He is equally displeased that Thayer did not gift Villa with a copy of the film as promised.

Later Thayer reads the letter he was mailed. It is from his surviving assistant, who has since grown to manhood, married, and has a child with Villa as the godfather. The ex-assistant recounts that Villa had been assassinated in 1923, though the people of Mexico still hold him in great regard. The letter inspires Thayer to return to Mexico in order to screen the film, where it is met with a passionate audience who deliver a standing ovation during Villa's ending speech.

Thayer then goes on to narrate that Villa has since been reinterred in Mexico City to great fanfare, while The Life of General Villa has since become lost. He also states that he has become a footnote in history, though he "does not mind being a footnote to a legend."

== Cast ==
- Antonio Banderas as Pancho Villa
- Eion Bailey as Frank N. Thayer
- Alan Arkin as Sam Dreben
- Jim Broadbent as Harry Aitken
- Matt Day as John Reed
- Kyle Chandler as Raoul Walsh
- Michael McKean as William Christy Cabanne
- Colm Feore as D. W. Griffith
- Alexa Davalos as Teddy Sampson
- Anthony Head as William Benton
- Saul Rubinek as Eli Morton
- Damián Alcázar as General Rodolfo Fierro
- Pedro Armendáriz, Jr. as Don Luis Terrazas

== Accolades ==
| Year | Award | Category | Nominee(s) | Result | Ref. |
|---|---|---|---|---|---|
| 2004 | Artios Awards | Best Casting – TV Movie of the Week | John Papsidera | Nominated | |
| 2004 | Cinema Audio Society Awards | Outstanding Achievement in Sound Mixing for Television – Movies and Mini-Series | Hank Garfield, Rick Ash, Adam Jenkins, and Drew Webster | Nominated | |
| 2004 | Costume Designers Guild Awards | Outstanding Period/Fantasy Television Series | Eduardo Castro | Nominated | |
| 2004 | Critics' Choice Awards | Best Picture Made for Television | | Nominated | |
| 2004 | Golden Globe Awards | Best Actor in a Miniseries or Motion Picture Made for Television | Antonio Banderas | Nominated | |
| 2004 | Golden Reel Awards | Best Sound Editing in Television Long Form – Dialogue and ADR | Zack Davis, Geoffrey G. Rubay, Lou Kleinman, and David Williams | Won | |
| 2004 | Golden Reel Awards | Best Sound Editing in Television Long Form – Sound Effects and Foley | Zack Davis, Geoffrey G. Rubay, Tony Lamberti, Carey Milbradt, Bruce Tanis, Karen Vassar Triest, and David Williams | Won | |
| 2004 | Golden Reel Awards | Best Sound Editing in Television Long Form – Music | Allan K. Rosen, Nicholas Viterelli, and Joshua Winget | Nominated | |
| 2004 | Imagen Awards | Best Movie for Television | | Won | |
| 2004 | Imagen Awards | Best Actor in a Television Drama | Antonio Banderas | Won | |
| 2004 | Make-Up Artists and Hair Stylists Guild Awards | Best Makeup – Television Mini-Series/Movie of the Week | Dorothy J. Pearl | Nominated | |
| 2004 | NAMIC Vision Awards | Best Drama | | Nominated | |
| 2004 | NAMIC Vision Awards | Best Dramatic Performance | Antonio Banderas | Won | |
| 2004 | Primetime Emmy Awards | Outstanding Made for Television Movie | Joshua D. Maurer, Mark Gordon, Larry Gelbart, Gary Levinsohn, Tony Mark, Sue Jett, and Diane Sillan Isaacs | Nominated | |
| 2004 | Primetime Emmy Awards | Outstanding Lead Actor in a Miniseries or a Movie | Antonio Banderas | Nominated | |
| 2004 | Primetime Emmy Awards | Outstanding Writing for a Miniseries, Movie or a Dramatic Special | Larry Gelbart | Nominated | |
| 2004 | Primetime Emmy Awards | Outstanding Art Direction for a Miniseries or Movie | Herbert Pinter, Bernardo Trujillo, and Jay Aroesty | Nominated | |
| 2004 | Primetime Emmy Awards | Outstanding Cinematography for a Miniseries or Movie | Peter James | Nominated | |
| 2004 | Primetime Emmy Awards | Outstanding Costumes for a Miniseries, Movie or a Special | Eduardo Castro, Michael R. Chapman, and Bárbara González Monsreal | Nominated | |
| 2004 | Primetime Emmy Awards | Outstanding Makeup for a Miniseries, Movie or a Special (Non-Prosthetic) | Dorothy J. Pearl and Nena Smarz | Nominated | |
| 2004 | Primetime Emmy Awards | Outstanding Single-Camera Picture Editing for a Miniseries, Movie or a Special | Mark Warner and Edward Warschilka | Nominated | |
| 2004 | Primetime Emmy Awards | Outstanding Sound Editing for a Miniseries, Movie or a Special | Geoffrey G. Rubay, Zack Davis, Tony Lamberti, David Williams, Karen Vassar Triest, Bruce Tanis, Carey Milbradt, Lou Kleinman, Allan K. Rosen, Nicholas Viterelli, Joshua Winget, and Michael Lyle | Won | |
| 2004 | Producers Guild of America Awards | David L. Wolper Award for Outstanding Producer of Long-Form Television | Joshua D. Maurer, Mark Gordon, and Larry Gelbart | Nominated | |
| 2004 | Satellite Awards | Best Motion Picture Made for Television | | Nominated | |
| 2004 | Satellite Awards | Best Supporting Actor – Series, Miniseries or Television Film | Eion Bailey | Nominated | |
| 2004 | Writers Guild of America Awards | Long Form – Original | Larry Gelbart | Won | |
| 2005 | Art Directors Guild Awards | Excellence in Production Design Award – Television Movie or Mini-series | Herbert Pinter, Bernardo Trujillo, and Gian Fabio Bosco | Won | |
