= Angels in America (soundtrack) =

Soundtrack album by Thomas Newman
- Released: December 2, 2003
- Recorded: 2003
- Genres: Soundtrack, Instrumental
- Length: 1:13:00
- Label: Nonesuch Records
- Producer: Thomas Newman

Thomas Newman chronology
Finding Nemo (2003)	Angels in America (2003)	Lemony Snicket's A Series of Unfortunate Events (2004)

Music From the HBO Film: Angels in America is the original soundtrack album, on the Nonesuch label, of the 2003 Emmy Award-winning and Golden Globe-winning miniseries Angels in America. It was nominated for Grammy Award for Best Score Soundtrack Album for a Motion Picture, Television or Other Visual Media.

The original score and songs were all composed by Thomas Newman, unless said otherwise.

== Track listing ==
No.	Song title	Time
1.	Threshold of Revelation	0:57
2.	Angels in America (main title)	2:20
3.	Lesionnaire	0:41
4.	Ellis Island	2:08
5.	Acolyte of the Flux	1:17
6.	Umdankbar Kind	1:27
7.	The Ramble	1:09
8.	Ozone	0:59
9.	Pill Poppers	1:19
10.	Quartet	6:46
11.	Solitude (performed by Duke Ellington); Written by Eddie DeLange and Irving Mills	3:14
12.	Bayeux Tapestry	1:51
13.	Spotty Monster	0:49
14.	Mauve Antarctica	4:49
15.	Her Fabulous Incipience	1:07
16.	The Infinite Descent	0:57
17.	A Closer Walk with Thee (performed by George Lewis & His Ragtime Band)	2:59
18.	Broom of Truth	2:52
19.	Submit!	1:17
20.	Plasma Orgasmata	3:00
21.	Delicate Particle Logic	1:39
22.	The Mormons	1:53
23.	Prophet Birds	2:44
24.	More Life	2:12
25.	Black Angel	4:12
26.	Garden of the Soul	4:07
27.	Heaven	2:04
28.	Bethesda Fountain	1:20
29.	The Great Work Begins (End Title)	3:59
30.	Tropopause	3:00
31.	I'm His Child (performed by Zella Jackson-Price)	3:36
