= For Love or Country: The Arturo Sandoval Story =

2000 film by Joseph Sargent

- South Korean DVD cover
- Genre: Biographical drama
- Written by: Timothy J. Sexton
- Directed by: Joseph Sargent
- Starring: Andy García; Mía Maestro; Gloria Estefan; David Paymer
- Music by: Arturo Sandoval
- Country of origin: United States
- Original language: English

Production
- Executive producers: Jellybean Benítez; Andy García
- Producer: Celia D. Costas
- Cinematography: Donald M. Morgan
- Editor: Michael Brown
- Running time: 120 minutes
- Production company: HBO Films

Original release
- Network: HBO
- Release: November 18, 2000

For Love or Country: The Arturo Sandoval Story is a 2000 American biographical drama television film about jazz musician Arturo Sandoval, starring Andy García. Sandoval himself composed the film's soundtrack. Mía Maestro, Gloria Estefan and David Paymer also star. The film was directed by Joseph Sargent, written by Timothy J. Sexton, and produced for HBO, which aired it on November 18, 2000.

== Plot ==
World-class trumpeter Arturo Sandoval was a part of the jazz scene of Cuba. The film is the story of Sandoval's life, up to his defection to the United States.

== Cast ==
- Andy García as Arturo Sandoval
- Mía Maestro as Marianela
- Gloria Estefan as Emilia
- David Paymer as Embassy Interviewer
- Charles S. Dutton as Dizzy Gillespie
- Tomas Milian as Sosa
- Freddy Rodríguez as Leonel
- José Zúñiga as Paquito D'Rivera
- Steven Bauer as Angel
- Fionnula Flanagan as Sally
- Miguel Sandoval as Osvaldo
- Fernanda Andrade as Paloma
- Arturo Sandoval Valet (uncredited cameo)
