= Tony Mark =

American film director

- Born: Anthony Mark; New York City, USA
- Occupations: Film producer; production manager; assistant director
- Years active: 1991–present

Tony Mark (also known as Anthony Mark) is an American film producer, director and screenwriter. He has worked with Kathryn Bigelow and Robert Rodriguez.

Mark was a producer of And Starring Pancho Villa as Himself, which won an Imagen Award in 2004 as "Best Movie for Television".

== Biography ==
=== Early life ===
Mark worked at WEOK-FM as a disc jockey for a late-night jazz/blues program. He worked for Wakeford-Orloff and Dick Miller Associates, where he made television commercials for Coca-Cola, GE, IBM, Texaco and others.

== Selected filmography ==
=== As producer ===
- The Hurt Locker (2009)
- Georgia O'Keeffe (2009)
- Fire Bay (2008)
- Bordertown (2007) (co-producer)
- Ultraviolet (2006) (executive producer)
- Once Upon a Time in Mexico (2003) (co-producer)
- Scary Movie 2 (2001) (co-executive producer)
- Jackie Bouvier Kennedy Onassis (2000) (TV) (producer)
- 8 Seconds (1994) (co-producer)
- The Fisher King (1991) (associate producer) (as Anthony Mark)
- Zelly and Me (1988) (producer)
- Billy Galvin (1986) (producer)

=== As Production Manager ===
- The Hurt Locker (2009)
- Bordertown (2006) (unit production manager)
- Scary Movie 2 (2001) (unit production manager)
- The Wedding Planner (2001) (unit production manager)
- Jackie Bouvier Kennedy Onassis (2000) (TV) (unit production manager)
- The Mirror Has Two Faces (1996) (unit production manager)
- Desperado (1995) (unit production manager)
- 8 Seconds (1994) (unit production manager)
- Nowhere to Run (1993) (unit production manager)
- The Fisher King (1991) (unit production manager) (as Anthony Mark)

=== As Second Unit Director ===
- Scary Movie 2 (2001) (second unit director)
- Jackie Bouvier Kennedy Onassis (2000) (TV) (second unit director: New York/Canada)
- Earthly Possessions (1999) (TV) (second unit director)

== Awards and honors ==
- The Hurt Locker (2009) – Venice Film Festival – SIGNIS Grand Prize – Best Film
- The Hurt Locker (2009) – Venice Film Festival – Human Rights Film Network Award – Best Film
- The Hurt Locker (2009) – Venice Film Festival – Arca Young Cinema Award – Best Film Venezia 65
- The Hurt Locker (2009) – Venice Film Festival – Sergio Trasatti Award – Best Film
- And Starring Pancho Villa as Himself (2003) (TV) – Emmy Nomination "Outstanding Made for Television Movie"
- The Fisher King (1991) – 5 Oscar nominations, 1 win ("best actress" Mercedes Ruehl),
- The Fisher King (1991) – Won 3 Golden Globes (Jeff Bridges, Mercedes Ruehl, and Robin Williams), nominated for best director and best motion picture
