= Scott Ferguson (producer) =

American television and film producer

- Education: Cornell University (BA); Columbia University (MFA)
- Occupations: Television and film producer
- Notable work: Succession
- Awards: Emmy Awards (2010, 2014, 2020)

Scott Ferguson is an American television and film producer. He was an executive producer of the HBO series Succession.

== Biography ==
Ferguson grew up in Pittsburgh, PA. He received his B.A. from Cornell University and MFA from Columbia University. He began his career with producer Michael Hausman. He was unit manager of The Firm (1993) and associate producer of films on Nobody’s Fool (1994), A Family Thing (1996), Twilight (2008), The People vs. Larry Flynt (1996) and Man on the Moon (1999), and an assistant director on Eternal Sunshine of the Spotless Mind (2004).

Ferguson was nominated for eight Emmy Awards and won three, including the 2010 Primetime Emmy Award for Outstanding Television Movie for producing Temple Grandin (2010), 2014 Primetime Emmy Award for Outstanding Television Movie for producing The Normal Heart (2014), and 2020 Primetime Emmy Award for Outstanding Drama Series as executive producer of Succession (2018–2023).

Ferguson also received four Directors Guild of America Awards for his work on Brokeback Mountain (2005), Recount (2008), Temple Grandin (2010) and Succession (2018–2023). He earned six Producers Guild Film Award nominations, earning three awards for his work on The Normal Heart (2014) and Succession (2018–2023).

Ferguson received Peabody Awards in 2011 and 2019 for his work on Temple Grandin (2010) and Succession (2018–2023).
