= 15th Producers Guild of America Awards =

15th Annual Producers Guild Awards
- Date: January 17, 2004
- Location: The Century Plaza Hotel, Los Angeles, California
- Country: United States
- Presented by: Producers Guild of America
- Hosted by: John Larroquette

Highlights
- Best Producer(s) Motion Picture: The Lord of the Rings: The Return of the King – Barrie M. Osborne, Peter Jackson, and Fran Walsh

The 15th Producers Guild of America Awards (also known as 2004 Producers Guild Awards), honoring the best film and television producers of 2003, were held at The Century Plaza Hotel in Los Angeles, California on January 17, 2004. The ceremony was hosted by John Larroquette. The nominees were announced on January 5, 2004.

== Winners and nominees ==
=== Film ===
Darryl F. Zanuck Award for Outstanding Producer of Theatrical Motion Pictures
- The Lord of the Rings: The Return of the King – Barrie M. Osborne, Peter Jackson, and Fran Walsh
  - Cold Mountain
  - The Last Samurai
  - Master and Commander: The Far Side of the World
  - Mystic River
  - Seabiscuit

=== Television ===
Norman Felton Award for Outstanding Producer of Episodic Television, Drama
- Six Feet Under
  - 24
  - Alias
  - CSI: Crime Scene Investigation
  - The West Wing
Danny Thomas Award for Outstanding Producer of Episodic Television, Comedy
- Sex and the City
  - Everybody Loves Raymond
  - Malcolm in the Middle
  - Scrubs
  - Will & Grace
David L. Wolper Award for Outstanding Producer of Long-Form Television
- My House in Umbria
  - And Starring Pancho Villa as Himself
  - Hitler: The Rise of Evil
  - Normal
  - The Pentagon Papers
Outstanding Producer of Reality/Game/Informational Series Television
- Queer Eye for the Straight Guy
  - The Amazing Race
  - American Idol
  - Biography
  - Project Greenlight
  - Survivor

=== David O. Selznick Achievement Award in Theatrical Motion Pictures ===
- Dino De Laurentiis

=== David Susskind Achievement Award in Television ===
- Lorne Michaels

=== Milestone Award ===
- Warren Beatty

=== Stanley Kramer Award ===
- Jim Sheridan and Arthur Lappin for In America

=== Vanguard Award ===
- James Cameron

=== Visionary Award ===
- Mike Nichols and Cary Brokaw for Angels in America
