= Martin Izquierdo =

Mexican-American costumer (1942–2025)

Martin Izquierdo (January 30, 1942 – June 25, 2025) was a Mexican-American costumer. He worked on the stage production of Angels in America and the 2003 HBO version. He operated Izquierdo Studio, which made both theater costumes and props.

He came to the United States from Mexico in the 1940s.

In 2006, he received the TDF/Irene Sharaff Artisan Award for "individual or company that has made an outstanding supportive contribution in the field of costume technology".

Izquierdo died of cardiovascular disease on 25 June 2025 at the age of 83.
