= Martin Starger =

American entertainment businessman (1932–2024)

- Starger in 1974
- Born: May 8, 1932; New York City, U.S.
- Died: May 31, 2024 (aged 92); Los Angeles, California, U.S.
- Occupations: Businessman, producer

Martin Starger (May 8, 1932 – May 31, 2024) was an American entertainment businessman and producer. He led ABC Entertainment (a wing of the American Broadcasting Company) during its boom period in the 1970s, pioneering the creation of television shows such as ABC Movie of the Week, Marcus Welby, M.D. and Happy Days. He also pushed the limits of television broadcast presiding over pioneering miniseries and specials such as Roots and Rich Man, Poor Man.

Starger was born in the Bronx, New York City in 1932. He made his way into films as the executive producer of Robert Altman's 1975 film Nashville before becoming tied to the film production department of Lew Grade's ITC Entertainment starting with Stanley Donen's 1978 film Movie Movie. Working with Grade, Starger became the president of Associated Film Distribution, the distributor of ITC's films which tied him to the production of films both successful (Autumn Sonata, The Muppet Movie, On Golden Pond, Sophie's Choice) and unsuccessful (Raise the Titanic, The Legend of the Lone Ranger, Saturn 3), some of which bombed in a manner that destroyed the company. After the fall of AFD, Starger continued to produce films such as Peter Bogdanovich's 1985 film Mask.

Starger died at his home in Los Angeles on May 31, 2024, at the age of 92.

Business positions
Preceded by Leonard Goldberg	Vice-President, Programs ABC; 1969–1972	Succeeded by unknown
Preceded by position created	President of ABC Entertainment; 1972–1975	Succeeded by Fred Silverman
