= Lemony Snicket's A Series of Unfortunate Events (soundtrack) =

Film score by Thomas Newman
- Released: December 7, 2004
- Genre: Film soundtrack
- Length: 68:46
- Label: Sony Classical

Thomas Newman chronology
Angels in America (2003)	Lemony Snicket's A Series of Unfortunate Events (2004)	Cinderella Man (2005)

Professional ratings
Review scores
Source	Rating
Allmusic	3.5/5 stars
Filmtracks	3.38 stars on a 5 point scale
SoundtrackNet	3.5/5 stars

Lemony Snicket's A Series of Unfortunate Events is the soundtrack on the Sony Classical label of the 2004 Lemony Snicket's A Series of Unfortunate Events, starring Jim Carrey, Meryl Streep, Catherine O'Hara, Billy Connolly, Liam Aiken, and Emily Browning. The original score was composed by Thomas Newman.

The album was nominated for the Academy Award for Best Original Score.

Many of the tracks from the soundtrack were used in the 2005 comedy film Fun with Dick and Jane, the 2007 documentary Sicko, and the trailers for Corpse Bride, No Reservations, and Alice in Wonderland.

== Track listing ==
Track listing
No.	Title	Length
1.	"The Bad Beginning"	3:20
2.	"Chez Olaf"	3:12
3.	"The Baudelaire Orphans"	2:32
4.	"In Loco Parentis"	1:27
5.	"Resilience"	2:30
6.	"The Reptile Room"	1:36
7.	"An Unpleasant Incident Involving a Train"	4:51
8.	"Curdled Cave"	2:04
9.	"Puttanesca"	2:41
10.	"Curious Feeling of Falling"	1:45
11.	"Regarding the Incredibly Deadly Viper"	2:33
12.	"The Marvelous Marriage"	0:52
13.	"Lachrymose Ferry"	0:38
14.	"Concerning Aunt Josephine"	2:08
15.	"V.F.D."	1:11
16.	"The Wide Window"	1:12
17.	"Cold as Ike"	2:45
18.	"Hurricane Herman"	2:18
19.	"Snaky Message"	2:31
20.	"The Regrettable Episode of the Leeches"	2:45
21.	"Interlude with Sailboat"	1:04
22.	"Verisimilitude"	2:16
23.	"Loverly Spring"	1:50
24.	"A Woeful Wedding"	3:21
25.	"Attack of the Hook-Handed Man"	2:33
26.	"Taken by Surpreeze"	2:02
27.	"One Last Look"	1:41
28.	"The Letter That Never Came"	4:14
29.	"Drive Away (End Title)"	5:04

== See also ==
- Lemony Snicket's A Series of Unfortunate Events
