= List of awards and nominations received by Patricia Clarkson =

Patricia Clarkson awards and nominations
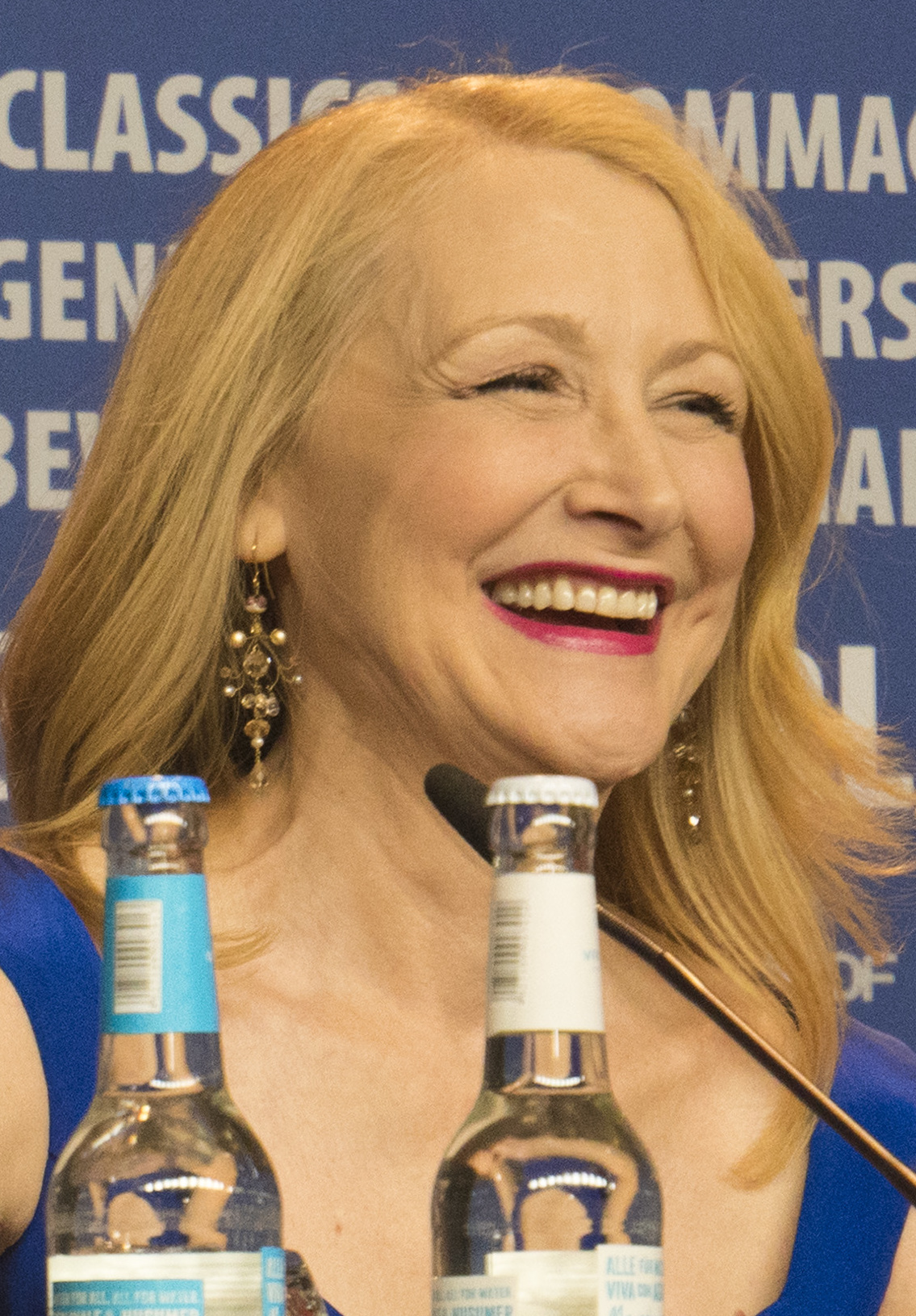
- Clarkson in 2018
Awards and nominations
Award	Wins	Nominations
Academy Awards	0	1
Emmy Awards	3	4
Golden Globes	1	2
SAG Awards	0	6
Tony Awards	0	1

Totals (Note: Certain award groups do not simply award one winner. They acknowledge several different recipients, have runners-up, and have third place. Since this is a specific recognition and is different from losing an award, runner-up mentions are considered wins in this award tally. For simplification and to avoid errors, each award in this list has been presumed to have had a prior nomination.)
- Wins: 22
- Nominations: 53

Patricia Clarkson is an American actress. After making her acting debut in 1987, she gained prominence for her roles on stage and screen. She has received several accolades including three Primetime Emmy Awards and a Golden Globe Award as well as nominations for an Academy Award, a British Independent Film Award, five Screen Actors Guild Awards and a Tony Award.

Clarkson garnered critical acclaim for her performance playing a German actress struggling with heroin addiction in the drama High Art (1998), which earned her an Independent Spirit Award nomination, among other critical accolades. Her subsequent performance as a warden's wife in psychological drama The Green Mile (1999) earned her a Saturn Award for Best Supporting Actress. In 2003, she starred in three films which received numerous accolades. She portrayed a cancer-stricken matriarch who reunites with her daughter in Pieces of April (2003), for which she was nominated for the Academy Award, Golden Globe Award, and the Screen Actors Guild Award for Outstanding Actress in a Supporting Role. That same year she played an artist grappling with the death of her son in The Station Agent (2003), which earned her a nomination for the Screen Actors Guild Award for Outstanding Actress in a Leading Role. For her role in All the Real Girls, for she won the Special Jury Prize at the Sundance Film Festival.

Clarkson earned two Primetime Emmy Awards for Outstanding Guest Actress in a Drama Series for her performance as a free-spirited, bohemian aunt in the HBO drama series Six Feet Under, in 2002 and 2006, respectively. She returned to the stage playing Mrs. Kendal in the Broadway revival of the Bernard Pomerance play The Elephant Man (2014) which earned her a nomination for the Tony Award for Best Featured Actress in a Play. In 2017, she won a British Independent Film Award for Best Supporting Actress for her performance in Sally Potter's The Party. She played Adora Crellin, a Southern matriarch in the HBO limited series Sharp Objects (2018) earning a Golden Globe Award as well as nominations for the Primetime Emmy Award and Screen Actors Guild Award for Outstanding Actress in a Miniseries or Television Movie.

== Major associations ==
=== Academy Awards ===
Year	Category	Nominated work	Result	Ref.
2003	Best Supporting Actress	Pieces of April	Nominated	

=== Critics' Choice Awards ===
Year	Category	Nominated work	Result	Ref.
Critics' Choice Movie Awards
2003	Best Supporting Actress	Pieces of April	Nominated	
Critics' Choice Television Awards
2012	Best Actress in a Miniseries or Movie	Five	Nominated	
2018	Best Supporting Actress in a Miniseries or Movie	Sharp Objects	Won	

=== Emmy Awards ===
Year	Category	Nominated work	Result	Ref.
Primetime Emmy Awards
2002	Outstanding Guest Actress in a Drama Series	Six Feet Under	Won	
2006	Outstanding Guest Actress in a Drama Series	Six Feet Under	Won	
2019	Outstanding Supporting Actress in a Limited Series or Movie	Sharp Objects	Nominated	
2022	Outstanding Actress in a Short Form Comedy or Drama Series	State of the Union	Won	

=== Golden Globe Awards ===
Year	Category	Nominated work	Result	Ref.
2003	Best Supporting Actress – Motion Picture	Pieces of April	Nominated	
2018	Best Supporting Actress – Television	Sharp Objects	Won	

=== Screen Actors Guild Awards ===
Year	Category	Nominated work	Result	Ref.
1999	Outstanding Cast in a Motion Picture	The Green Mile	Nominated	
2003	Outstanding Cast in a Motion Picture	The Station Agent	Nominated	
2003	Outstanding Actress in a Leading Role	The Station Agent	Nominated	
2003	Outstanding Actress in a Supporting Role	Pieces of April	Nominated	
2005	Outstanding Cast in a Motion Picture	Good Night, and Good Luck.	Nominated	
2019	Outstanding Actress in a Miniseries or Television Movie	Sharp Objects	Nominated	

=== Tony Awards ===
Year	Category	Nominated work	Result	Ref.
2014	Best Featured Actress in a Play	The Elephant Man	Nominated	

== Miscellaneous awards ==
Organizations	Year	Category	Work	Result	Ref.
British Independent Film Awards	2017	Best Supporting Actress	The Party	Won	
Deauville American Film Festival	2001	Best Female Performance	The Safety of Objects	Won	
Gotham Awards	2005	Best Ensemble Cast	Good Night, and Good Luck.	Nominated	
Independent Spirit Awards	1998	Best Supporting Female	High Art	Nominated	
Independent Spirit Awards	2003	Best Supporting Female	Pieces of April	Nominated	
Satellite Awards	2003	Best Supporting Actress – Motion Picture	The Station Agent	Nominated	
Satellite Awards	2003	Best Supporting Actress – Motion Picture	Pieces of April	Won	
Saturn Awards	1999	Best Supporting Actress	The Green Mile	Won	
Sundance Film Festival	2003	Special Jury Prize	The Station Agent	Won	
Sundance Film Festival	2003	Special Jury Prize	All the Real Girls	Won	
Sundance Film Festival	2003	Special Jury Prize	Pieces of April	Won	

== Critics' awards ==
Year	Nominated work	Association	Category	Result	Ref.
1998	Boston Society of Film Critics	Best Supporting Actress	High Art	Nominated	
1998	National Society of Film Critics	Best Supporting Actress	High Art	Nominated	
2001	San Diego Film Critics Society	Body of Work Award	The Safety of Objects	Won	
2002	National Society of Film Critics	Best Supporting Actress	Far from Heaven	Won	
2002	New York Film Critics Circle	Best Supporting Actress	Far from Heaven	Won	
2002	Chicago Film Critics Association	Best Supporting Actress	Far from Heaven	Nominated	
2002	Las Vegas Film Critics Society	Best Supporting Actress	Far from Heaven	Nominated	
2003	Boston Society of Film Critics	Best Supporting Actress	The Station Agent	Won	
2003	Kansas City Film Critics Circle	Best Supporting Actress	The Station Agent	Won	
2003	National Society of Film Critics	Best Supporting Actress	The Station Agent	Won	
2003	National Board of Review	Best Supporting Actress	The Station Agent	Won	
2003	San Diego Film Critics Society	Body of Work Award	The Station Agent	Won	
2003	Las Vegas Film Critics Society	Best Supporting Actress	The Station Agent	Nominated	
2003	Phoenix Film Critics Society	Best Cast	The Station Agent	Nominated	
2003	San Diego Film Critics Society	Body of Work Award	All the Real Girls	Won	
2003	Boston Society of Film Critics	Best Supporting Actress	Pieces of April	Won	
2003	Chicago Film Critics Association	Best Supporting Actress	Pieces of April	Won	
2003	Florida Film Critics Circle	Best Supporting Actress	Pieces of April	Won	
2003	National Society of Film Critics	Best Supporting Actress	Pieces of April	Won	
2003	National Board of Review	Best Supporting Actress	Pieces of April	Won	
2003	Phoenix Film Critics Society	Supporting Actress	Pieces of April	Won	
2003	San Diego Film Critics Society	Body of Work Award	Pieces of April	Won	
2003	San Francisco Film Critics Circle	Best Supporting Actress	Pieces of April	Won	
2003	Vancouver Film Critics Circle	Best Supporting Actress	Pieces of April	Won	
2003	Broadcast Film Critics Association	Best Supporting Actress	Pieces of April	Nominated	
2003	Las Vegas Film Critics Society	Best Supporting Actress	Pieces of April	Nominated	
2003	Online Film Critics Society	Best Supporting Actress	Pieces of April	Nominated	

== Sources ==
- Rountree, Cathleen (2006). The Movie Lovers' Club: How to Start Your Own Film Group. New World Library. ISBN 978-1-930-72252-1.
