= Patricia Clarkson on screen and stage =

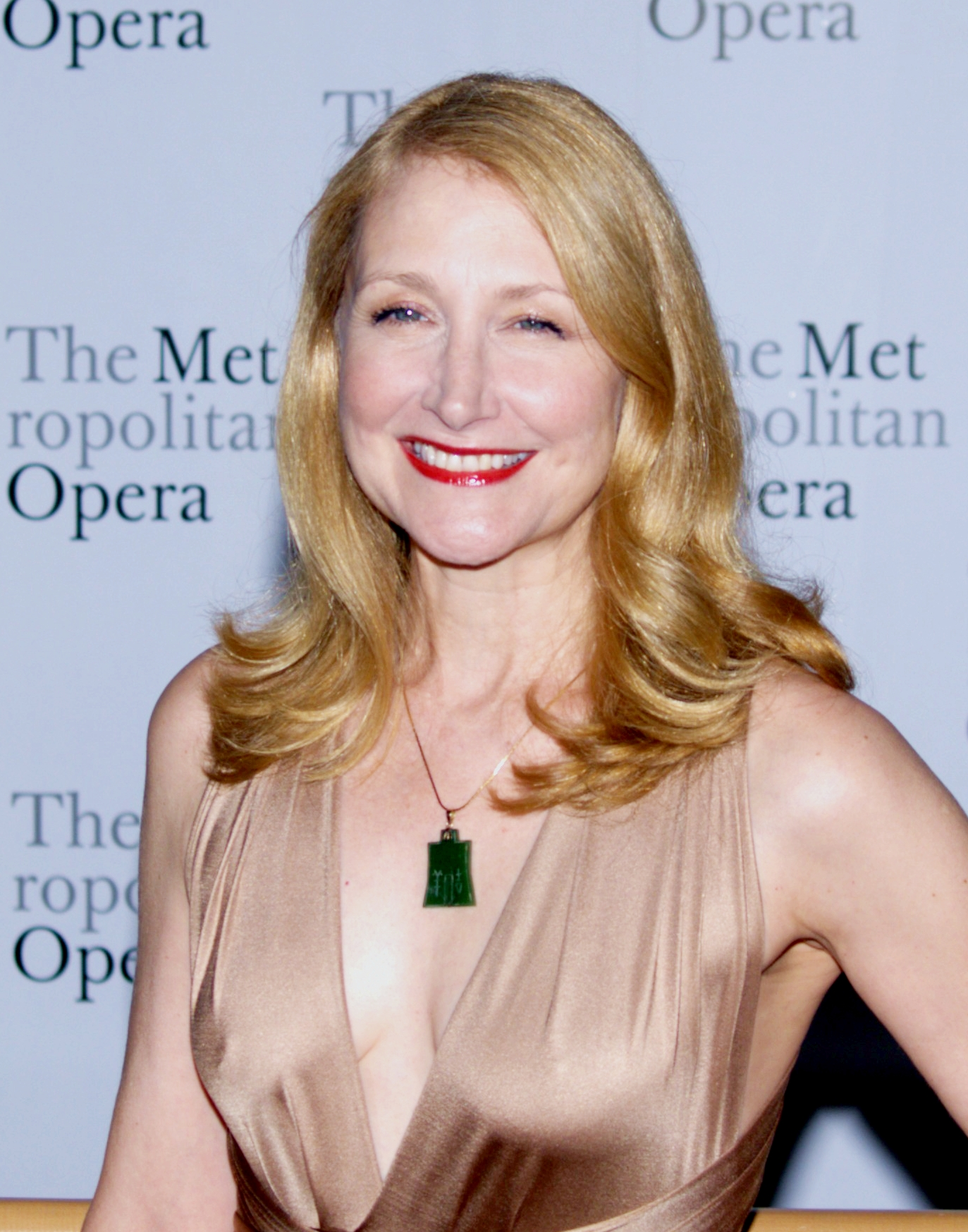
Clarkson in September 2010

Patricia Clarkson is an American actress who made her film debut in Brian De Palma's mob drama The Untouchables (1987), followed by a supporting role in Clint Eastwood's The Dead Pool (1988). After appearing in minor roles in the early and mid-1990s, she garnered critical attention for her portrayal of a drug-addicted actress in the independent drama High Art (1998). She appeared in numerous supporting roles in such films as The Green Mile (1999), The Pledge (2001), Far from Heaven (2002), and Dogville (2003).

She received a Screen Actors Guild Award nomination for her role in the 2003 drama film The Station Agent, as well as a nomination for Golden Globe and an Academy Award for Best Supporting Actress for Pieces of April. Clarkson also appeared as a recurring guest star on the HBO series Six Feet Under from 2002 to 2005, and won two Primetime Emmy Awards for her performance. Other credits from the 2000s include Good Night, and Good Luck with David Strathairn (2005), Lars and the Real Girl with Ryan Gosling (2007), and Elegy with Penélope Cruz (2008). She also appeared in Woody Allen films Vicky Cristina Barcelona (2008) and Whatever Works (2009).

In 2010, Clarkson had a supporting role in Martin Scorsese's thriller Shutter Island, followed by roles in the comedies Easy A and Friends with Benefits. She subsequently portrayed the villainous Ava Paige in The Maze Runner (2014) and its two sequels. In 2017, she won a British Independent Film Award for Best Supporting Actress for her performance in Sally Potter's drama The Party, and guest-starred on the Netflix series House of Cards. She co-starred with Amy Adams on the HBO miniseries Sharp Objects in 2018, for which she won a Golden Globe for Best Supporting Actress in a Series, Miniseries, or Television Film.

Clarkson's theater career started in 1986 where she was the replacement for the role of Corrinna Stroller in The House of Blue Leaves. She played both roles of Nan and Lina in the 1997 play Three Days of Rain. She returned to theater in 2014, playing the role of Madge Kendal in a Broadway production of The Elephant Man, for which she was nominated for a Tony Award for Best Featured Actress.

== Film ==
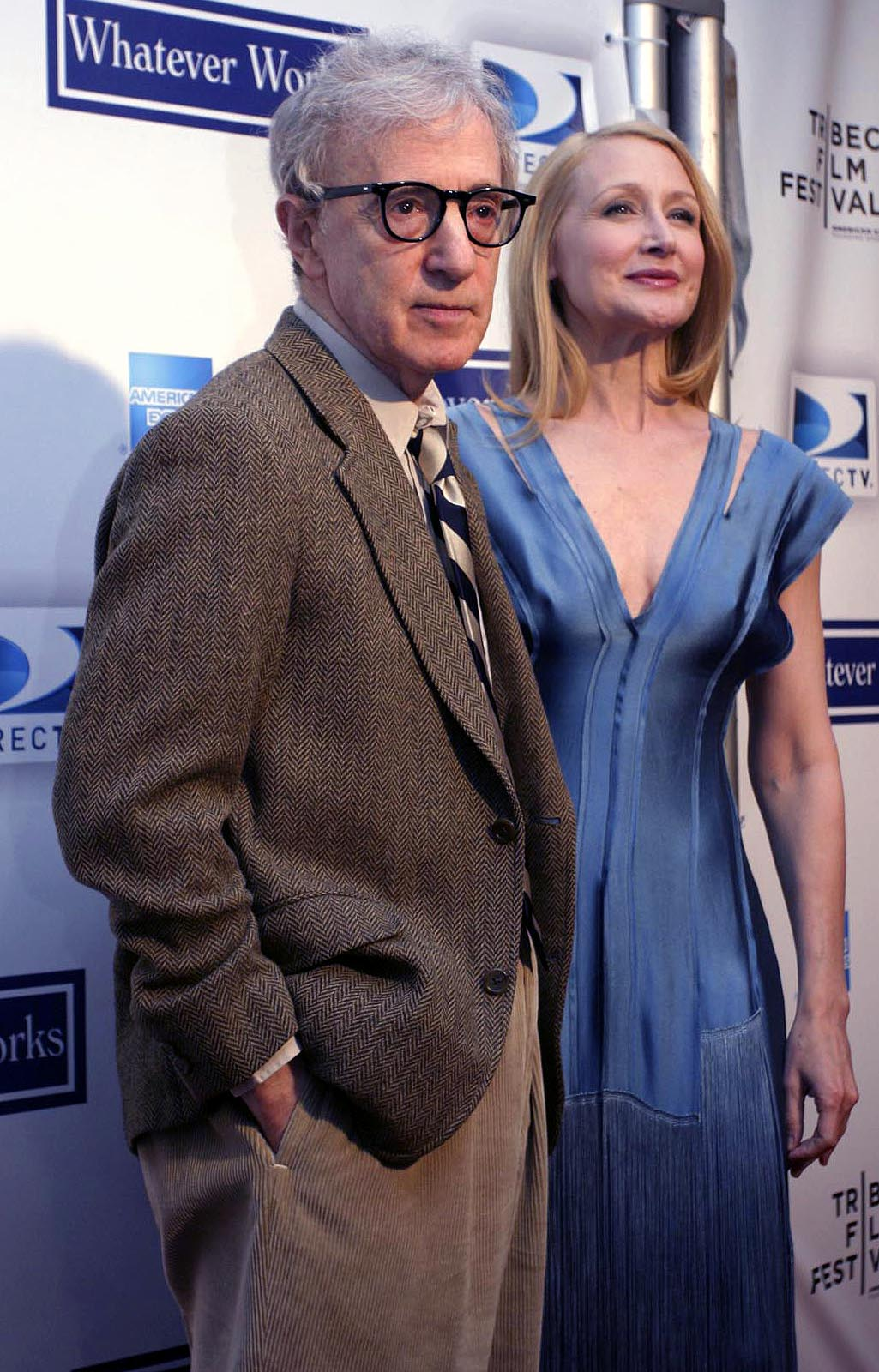
With American film director Woody Allen at the Whatever Works premiere in April 2009

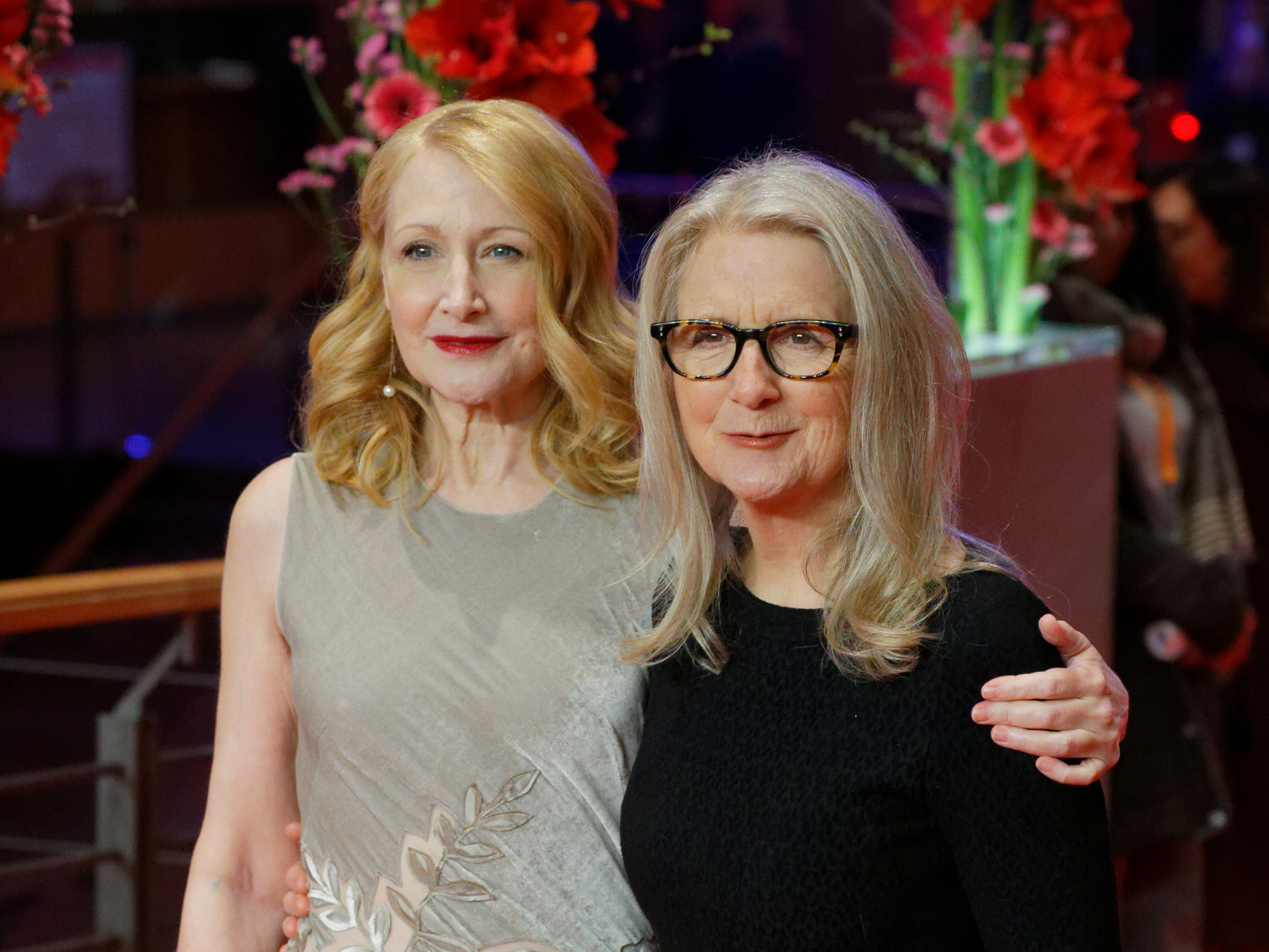
With English film director Sally Potter at the premiere for The Party in February 2017

Year	Title	Role	Notes	Ref.
1987	The Untouchables	Catherine Ness		
1988	The Dead Pool	Samantha Walker		
1988	Rocket Gibraltar	Rose Black		
1988	Everybody's All-American	Leslie Stone		
1990	Tune in Tomorrow	Aunt Olga		
1995	Pharaoh's Army	Sarah Anders		
1995	Jumanji	Carol Anne Parrish		
1998	Playing by Heart	Allison		
1998	High Art	Greta		
1999	The Green Mile	Melinda Moores		
1999	Wayward Son	Wesley		
1999	Simply Irresistible	Lois McNally		
2000	Falling Like This	Caroline Lockhart		
2000	Joe Gould's Secret	Vivian Marquie		
2001	The Safety of Objects	Annette Jennings		
2001	The Pledge	Margaret Larsen		
2001	Wendigo	Kim		
2002	Welcome to Collinwood	Rosalind		
2002	Far from Heaven	Eleanor Fine		
2002	Heartbreak Hospital	Lottie Ohrwasher		
2002	The Baroness and the Pig	The Baroness		
2003	Dogville	Vera		
2003	The Station Agent	Olivia Harris		
2003	All the Real Girls	Elvira Fine		
2003	Pieces of April	Joy Burns		
2004	Miracle	Patti Brooks		
2005	Good Night, and Good Luck	Shirley Wershba		
2005	The Dying Gaul	Elaine Tishop		
2006	The Woods	Ms. Traverse		
2006	All the King's Men	Sadie Burke		
2007	No Reservations	Paula		
2007	Lars and the Real Girl	Dr. Dagmar Bergman		
2007	Married Life	Pat Allen		
2008	Blind Date	Janna		
2008	Phoebe in Wonderland	Miss Dodger		
2008	Elegy	Carolyn		
2008	Vicky Cristina Barcelona	Judy Nash		
2009	Whatever Works	Marietta Celestine		
2009	2081	Narrator	Short film	
2009	For the Love of Movies	Narrator	Documentary	
2009	Cairo Time	Juliette Grant		
2010	Shutter Island	2nd Rachel Solando		
2010	Legendary	Sharon Chetley		
2010	Main Street	Willa Jenkins		
2010	Easy A	Rosemary Penderghast		
2011	Friends with Benefits	Lorna		
2011	One Day	Alison Mayhew		
2013	The East	Sharon		
2014	The Maze Runner	Ava Paige		
2014	Last Weekend	Celia Green		
2014	Learning to Drive	Wendy Shields		
2014	October Gale	Helen Matthews		
2014	Annie	Focus group woman	Cameo	
2015	Maze Runner: The Scorch Trials	Ava Paige		
2017	The Party	April		
2017	The Bookshop	Mrs. Violet Gamart		
2018	Maze Runner: The Death Cure	Ava Paige		
2018	Jonathan	Dr. Mina Nariman		
2018	Delirium	Brody		
2018	Out of Blue	Detective Mike Hoolihan		
2019	Almost Love	Ravella Brewer		
2022	Monica	Eugenia		
2022	She Said	Rebecca Corbett		
2024	Lilly	Lilly Ledbetter		
2027	The Comebacker †		Filming	
TBA	What Happens at Night †		Post-production	

Key
†	Denotes works that have not yet been released

== Television ==
Year	Title	Role	Notes	Ref.
1985	Spenser: For Hire	Elizabeth Haller	Episode: "The Choice"	
1986	The Equalizer	Deborah Wade	Episode: "Breakpoint"	
1990	Tales from the Crypt	Suzy	Episode: "Mute Witness to Murder"	
1990	Law & Order	Laura Winthrop	Episode: "By Hooker, By Crook"	
1990	The Old Man and the Sea	Mary Pruitt	Television film	
1991	Davis Rules	Cosmo Yeargin	13 episodes	
1991	Blind Man's Bluff	Dr. Virginia Hertz	Television film	
1992	An American Story	Barbara Meade	Television film	
1992	Legacy of Lies	Pat Rafael	Television film	
1992	Four Eyes and Six Guns	Lucy Laughton	Television film	
1993	Caught in the Act	Meg	Television film	
1993	Alex Haley's Queen	Lizzie Perkins	Miniseries	
1994	She Led Two Lives	Desiree Parnell	Television film	
1995–96	Murder One	Annie Hoffman	23 episodes	
1996	London Suite	Diana Nichols	Television film	
1998	The Wedding	Della McNeil	Television film	
2000	Wonderland	Mrs. Tammy Banger	2 episodes	
2001	Frasier	Claire French	6 episodes	
2002	Carrie	Margaret White	Television film	
2002–05	Six Feet Under	Sarah O'Connor	7 episodes	
2007	American Masters	Narrator	Episode: "The American Dream"	
2009–11	Saturday Night Live	Mother	2 episodes	
2011	Parks and Recreation	Tammy Swanson I	2 episodes	
2012	The Dust Bowl	Hazel Lucas Shaw	Television documentary	
2012	Five	Mia Knowles	Television film	
2015	Broad City	Timothy's Mom	Episode: "St. Mark's"	
2016	American Dad!	Meredith Fields (voice)	Episode: "The Dentist's Wife"	
2016	Nature	Narrator	Episode: "Hummingbirds"	
2017–18	House of Cards	Jane Davis	Season 5-6; 13 episodes	
2018	Sharp Objects	Adora Crellin	Main role	
2020	American Experience	Additional voices	Episode: "The Vote"	
2022	State of the Union	Ellen	10 episodes	
2022	Green Eggs and Ham	Pam-I-Am (voice)	10 episodes	
2023	Gray	Cornelia Gray	8 episodes; also producer	
2026	Ransom Canyon	Claire O'Grady	Season 2	

== Theater ==
Year	Title	Roles	Venue	Ref.
1986	The House of Blue Leaves	Corrinna Stroller (replacement)	Vivian Beaumont Theater	
1989	Eastern Standard	Phoebe Kidde	John Golden Theatre	
1995	Raised in Captivity	Bernadette Dixon	Vineyard Theatre	
1996	The Ride Down Mount Morgan	Leah	Williamstown Theatre Festival	
1997	Three Days of Rain	Nan and Lina	New York City Center	
1998	The Maiden's Prayer	Libby	Vineyard Theatre	
2004	A Streetcar Named Desire	Blanche DuBois	Kennedy Center	
2014	The Elephant Man	Mrs. Kendal	Booth Theatre	
2024	Long Day's Journey into Night	Mary Tyrone	Wyndham's Theatre	
