= National Society of Film Critics Award for Best Supporting Actress =

Annual US film award

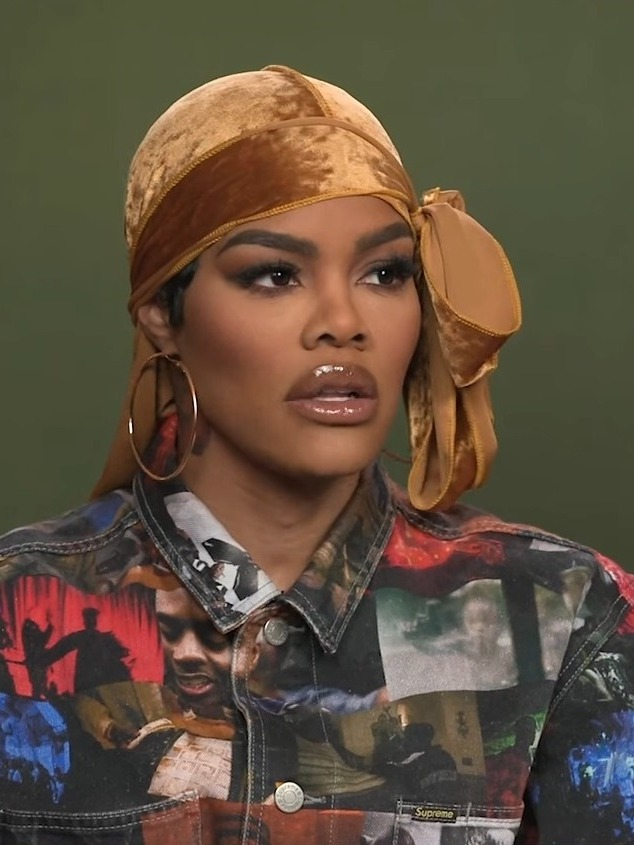
- Current recipient: Teyana Taylor
- Awarded for: Best Performance by an Actress in a Supporting Role
- Country: United States
- Presented by: National Society of Film Critics
- First award: Marjorie Rhodes; The Family Way (1967)
- Currently held by: Teyana Taylor; One Battle After Another (2025)
- Website: nationalsocietyoffilmcritics.com

The National Society of Film Critics Award for Best Supporting Actress is one of the annual awards given by the American National Society of Film Critics.

== Winners ==
=== 1960 ===
Year	Winner	Film	Role
1967	Marjorie Rhodes	The Family Way	Lucy Fitton
1968	Billie Whitelaw	Charlie Bubbles	Lottie Bubbles
1969	Siân Phillips	Goodbye, Mr. Chips	Ursula Mossbank
1969	Delphine Seyrig	Stolen Kisses	Fabienne Tabard

=== 1970 ===
Year	Winner	Film	Role
1970	Lois Smith	Five Easy Pieces	Partita Dupea
1971	Ellen Burstyn	The Last Picture Show	Lois Farrow
1972	Jeannie Berlin	The Heartbreak Kid	Lila Kolodny
1973	Valentina Cortese	Day for Night (La nuit américaine)	Séverine
1974	Bibi Andersson	Scenes from a Marriage	Katarina
1975	Lily Tomlin	Nashville	Linnea Reese
1976	Jodie Foster	Taxi Driver	Iris Steensma
1977	Ann Wedgeworth	Handle with Care	Joyce
1978	Meryl Streep	The Deer Hunter	Linda
1979	Meryl Streep	Kramer vs. Kramer	Joanna Kramer
1979	Meryl Streep	Manhattan	Jill Davis
1979	Meryl Streep	The Seduction of Joe Tynan	Karen Traynor

=== 1980s ===
Year	Winner	Film	Role
1980	Mary Steenburgen	Melvin and Howard	Lynda Dummar
1981	Maureen Stapleton	Reds	Emma Goldman
1982	Jessica Lange	Tootsie	Julie Nichols
1983	Sandra Bernhard	The King of Comedy	Masha
1984	Melanie Griffith	Body Double	Holly Body
1985	Anjelica Huston	Prizzi's Honor	Maerose Prizzi
1986	Dianne Wiest	Hannah and Her Sisters	Holly
1987	Kathy Baker	Street Smart	Punchy
1988	Mercedes Ruehl	Married to the Mob	Connie Russo
1989	Anjelica Huston	Enemies: A Love Story	Tamara Broder

=== 1990s ===
Year	Winner	Film	Role
1990	Annette Bening	The Grifters	Myra Langtry
1991	Jane Horrocks	Life Is Sweet	Nicola
1992	Judy Davis	Husbands and Wives	Sally
1993	Madeleine Stowe	Short Cuts	Sherri Shepard
1994	Dianne Wiest	Bullets over Broadway	Helen Sinclair
1995	Joan Allen	Nixon	Pat Ryan-Nixon
1996	Barbara Hershey	The Portrait of a Lady	Serena Merle
1997	Julianne Moore	Boogie Nights	Amber Waves
1998	Judi Dench	Shakespeare in Love	Queen Elizabeth I
1999	Chloë Sevigny	Boys Don't Cry	Lana Tisdel

=== 2000s ===
Year	Winner	Film	Role
2000	Elaine May	Small Time Crooks	May
2001	Helen Mirren	Gosford Park	Mrs. Wilson
2002	Patricia Clarkson	Far from Heaven	Eleanor Fine
2003	Patricia Clarkson	Pieces of April	Joy Burns
2003	Patricia Clarkson	The Station Agent	Olivia Harris
2004	Virginia Madsen	Sideways	Maya Randall
2005	Amy Adams	Junebug	Ashley Johnsten
2006	Meryl Streep	The Devil Wears Prada	Miranda Priestly
2006	Meryl Streep	A Prairie Home Companion	Yolanda Johnson
2007	Cate Blanchett	I'm Not There	Jude Quinn
2008	Hanna Schygulla	The Edge of Heaven	Susanne Staub
2009	Mo'Nique	Precious	Mary Lee Johnston

=== 2010s ===
Year	Winner	Film	Role
2010	Olivia Williams	The Ghost Writer	Ruth Lang
2011	Jessica Chastain	The Help	Celia Foote
2011	Jessica Chastain	The Tree of Life	Mrs. O'Brien
2011	Jessica Chastain	Take Shelter	Samantha LaForche
2012	Amy Adams	The Master	Peggy Dodd
2013	Jennifer Lawrence	American Hustle	Rosalyn Rosenfeld
2014	Patricia Arquette	Boyhood	Olivia Evans
2015	Kristen Stewart	Clouds of Sils Maria	Valentine
2016	Michelle Williams	Manchester by the Sea	Randi Chandler
2017	Laurie Metcalf	Lady Bird	Marion McPherson
2018	Regina King	If Beale Street Could Talk	Sharon Rivers
2019	Laura Dern	Little Women	Marmee March
2019	Laura Dern	Marriage Story	Nora Fanshaw

=== 2020s ===
Year	Winner	Film	Role
2020	Maria Bakalova	Borat Subsequent Moviefilm	Tutar Sagdiyev
2021	Ruth Negga	Passing	Clare Bellew
2022	Kerry Condon	The Banshees of Inisherin	Siobhán Súilleabháin
2023	Da'Vine Joy Randolph	The Holdovers	Mary Lamb
2024	Michele Austin	Hard Truths	Chantelle
2025	Teyana Taylor	One Battle After Another	Perfidia Beverly Hills

== Trivia ==
Jodie Foster is the youngest winner in this category, winning the award at age 13 for Taxi Driver (1976). In 2009, Mo'Nique became the first African-American to win in this category for Precious.

== Multiple awards ==
3 wins

- Meryl Streep (1978, 1979, 2006)

2 wins

- Amy Adams (2005, 2012)
- Patricia Clarkson (2002, 2003)
- Anjelica Huston (1985, 1989)
- Dianne Wiest (1986, 1994)

== See also ==
- National Board of Review Award for Best Supporting Actress
- New York Film Critics Circle Award for Best Supporting Actress
- Los Angeles Film Critics Association Award for Best Supporting Actress
