= 10th Screen Actors Guild Awards =

- Awarded for: Outstanding motion picture and primetime television performances
- Date: February 22, 2004
- Location: Shrine Auditorium; Los Angeles, California
- Country: United States
- Presented by: Screen Actors Guild
- Website: www.sagawards.org

Television/radio coverage
- Network: TNT

The 10th Screen Actors Guild Awards, awarded by the Screen Actors Guild and honoring the best achievements in film and television performances for the year 2003, took place on February 22, 2004. The ceremony was held at the Shrine Exposition Center in Los Angeles, California, and was televised live by TNT. The nominees were announced by Andie MacDowell and Mark Harmon at Los Angeles' Pacific Design Center's Silver Screen Theater on January 15, 2004.

== Winners and nominees ==
Winners are listed first and highlighted in boldface.

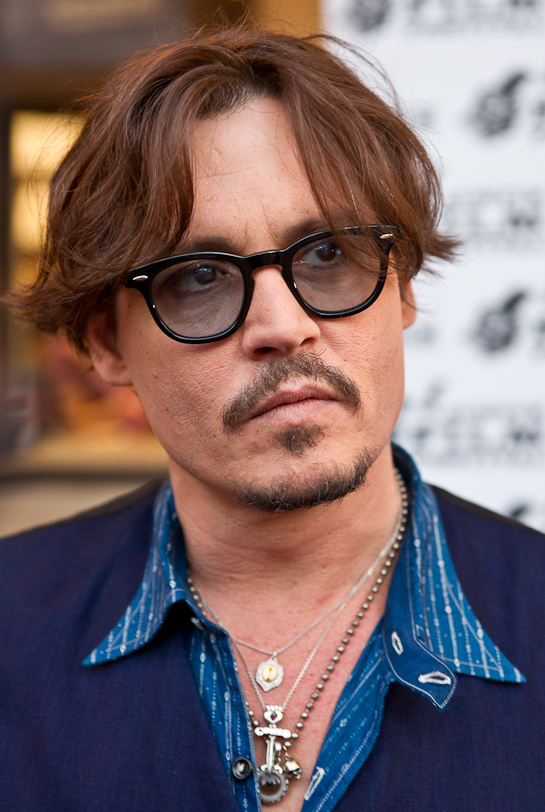
Johnny Depp, Outstanding Performance by a Male Actor in a Leading Role winner

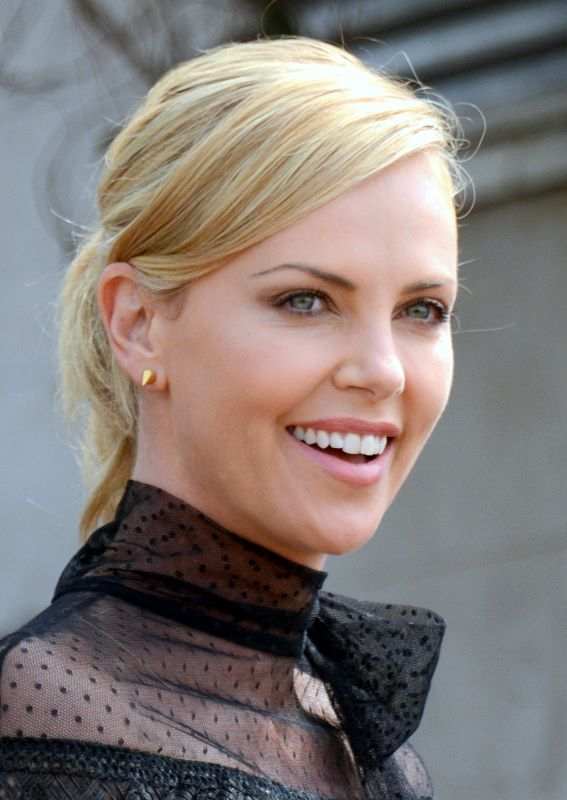
Charlize Theron, Outstanding Performance by a Female Actor in a Leading Role winner

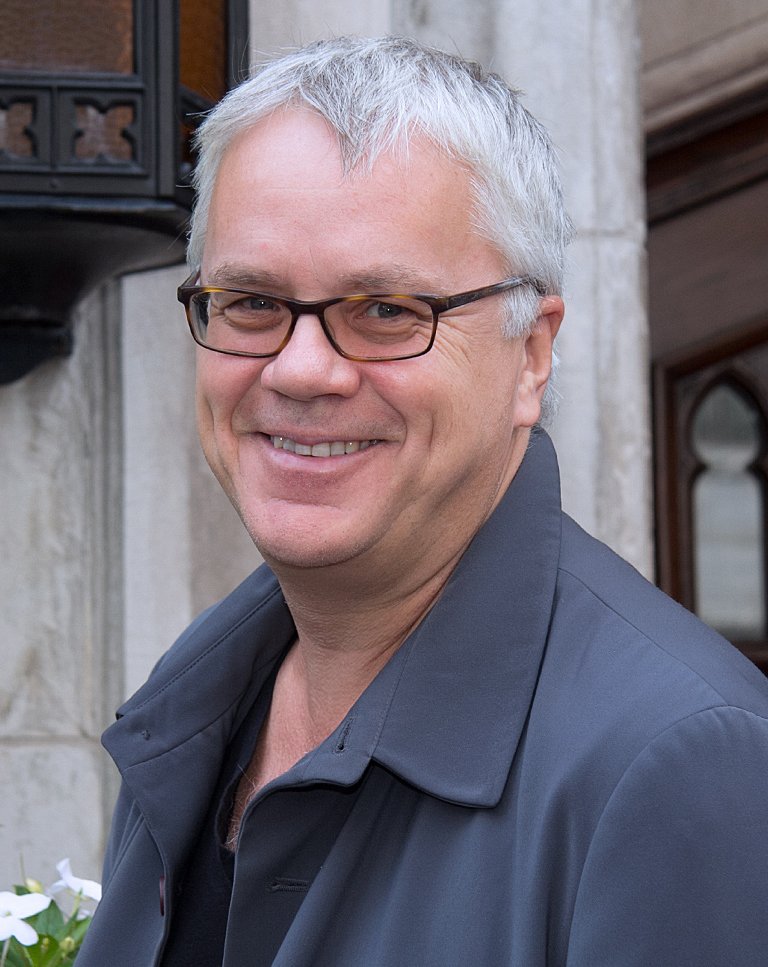
Tim Robbins, Outstanding Performance by a Male Actor in a Supporting Role winner

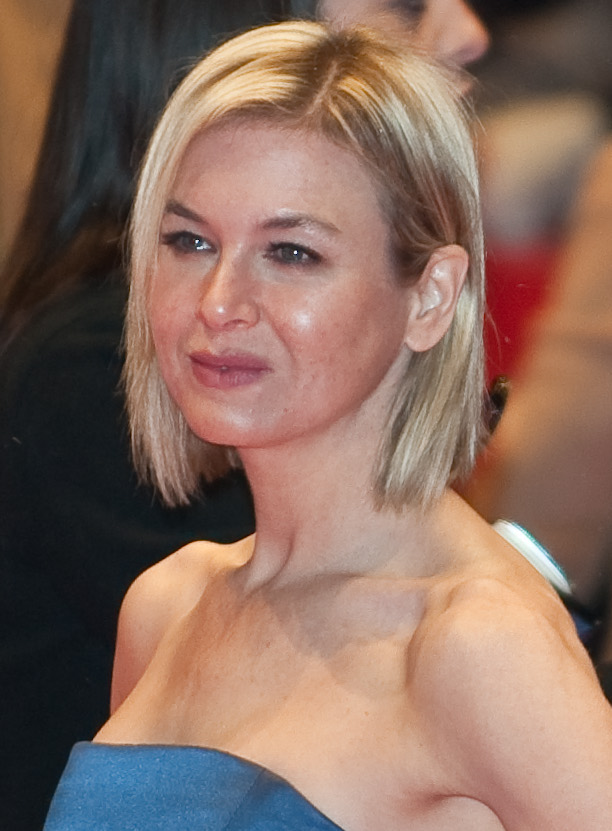
Renée Zellweger, Outstanding Performance by a Female Actor in a Supporting Role winner

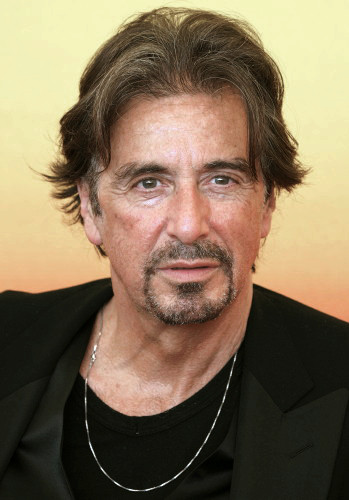
Al Pacino, Outstanding Performance by a Male Actor in a Miniseries or Television Movie winner

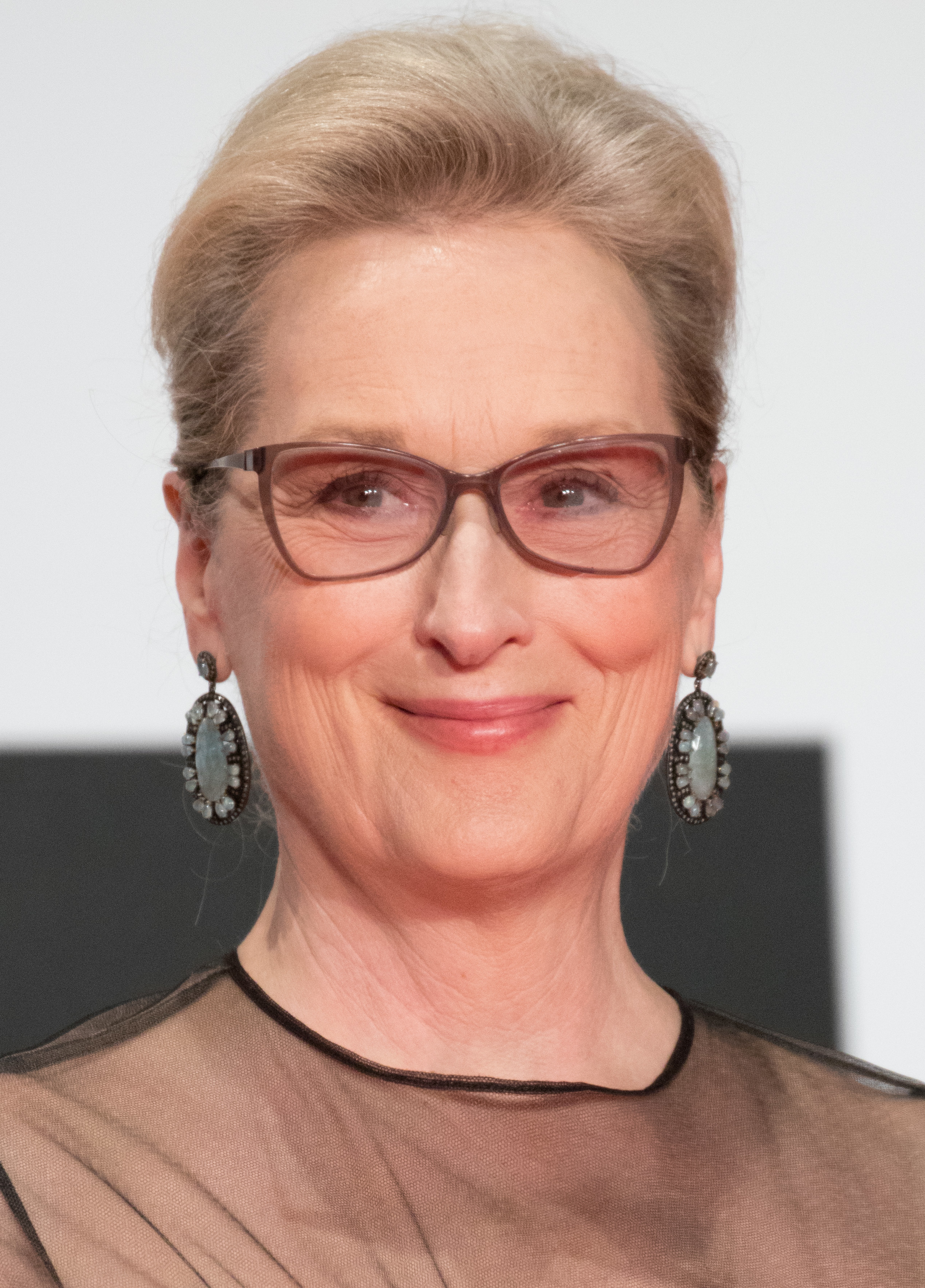
Meryl Streep, Outstanding Performance by a Female Actor in a Miniseries or Television Movie winner

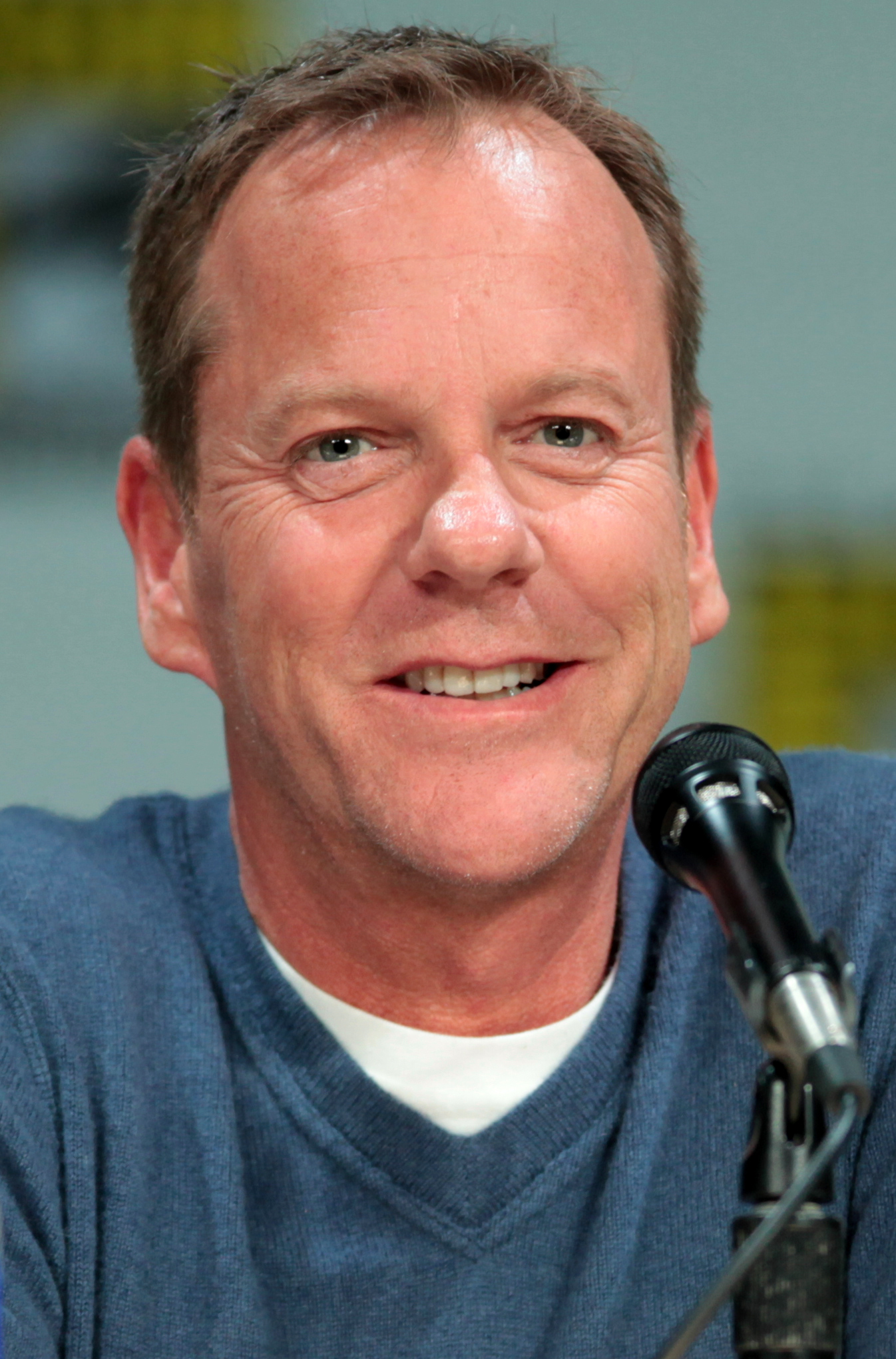
Kiefer Sutherland, Outstanding Performance by a Male Actor in a Drama Series winner

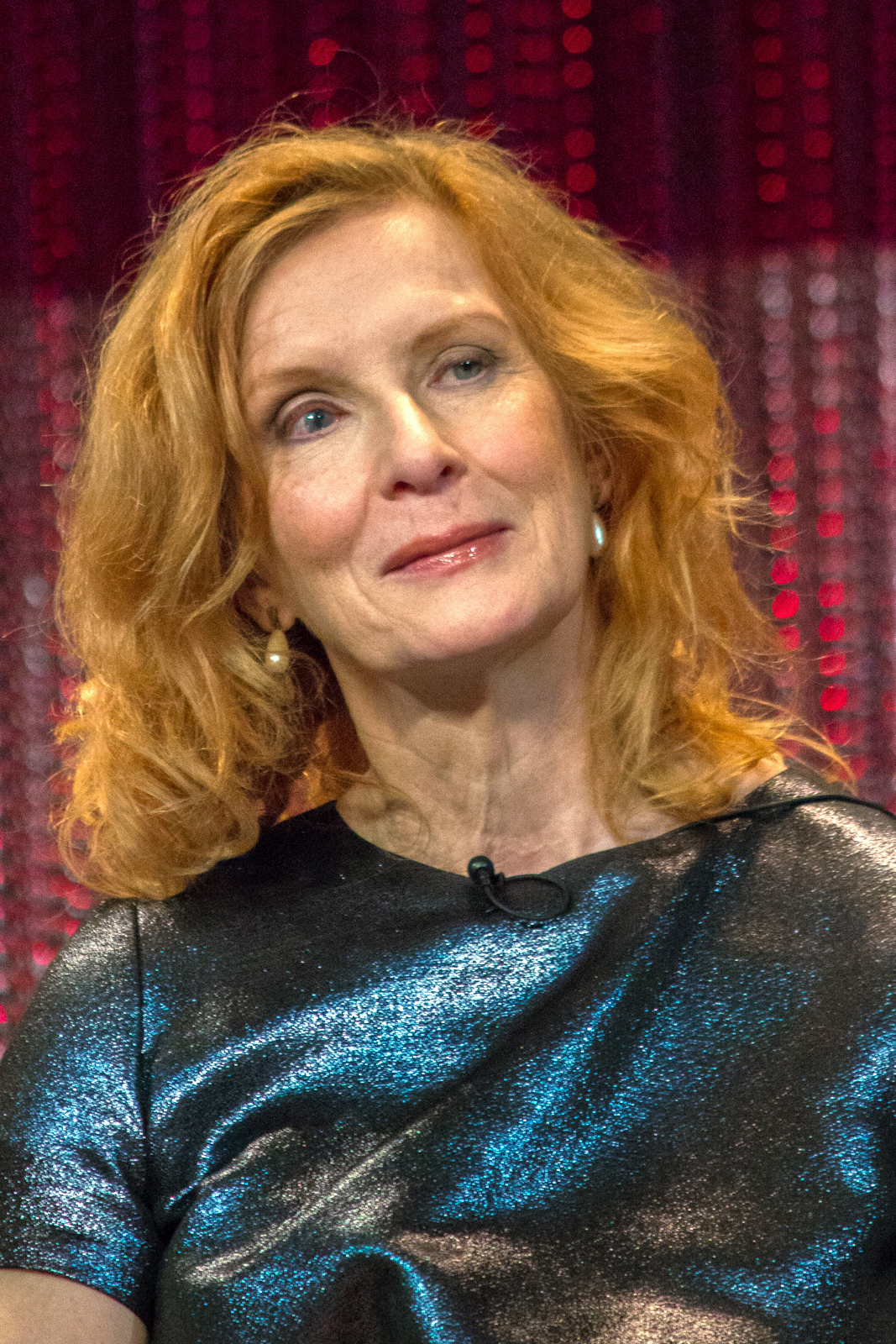
Frances Conroy, Outstanding Performance by a Female Actor in a Drama Series winner

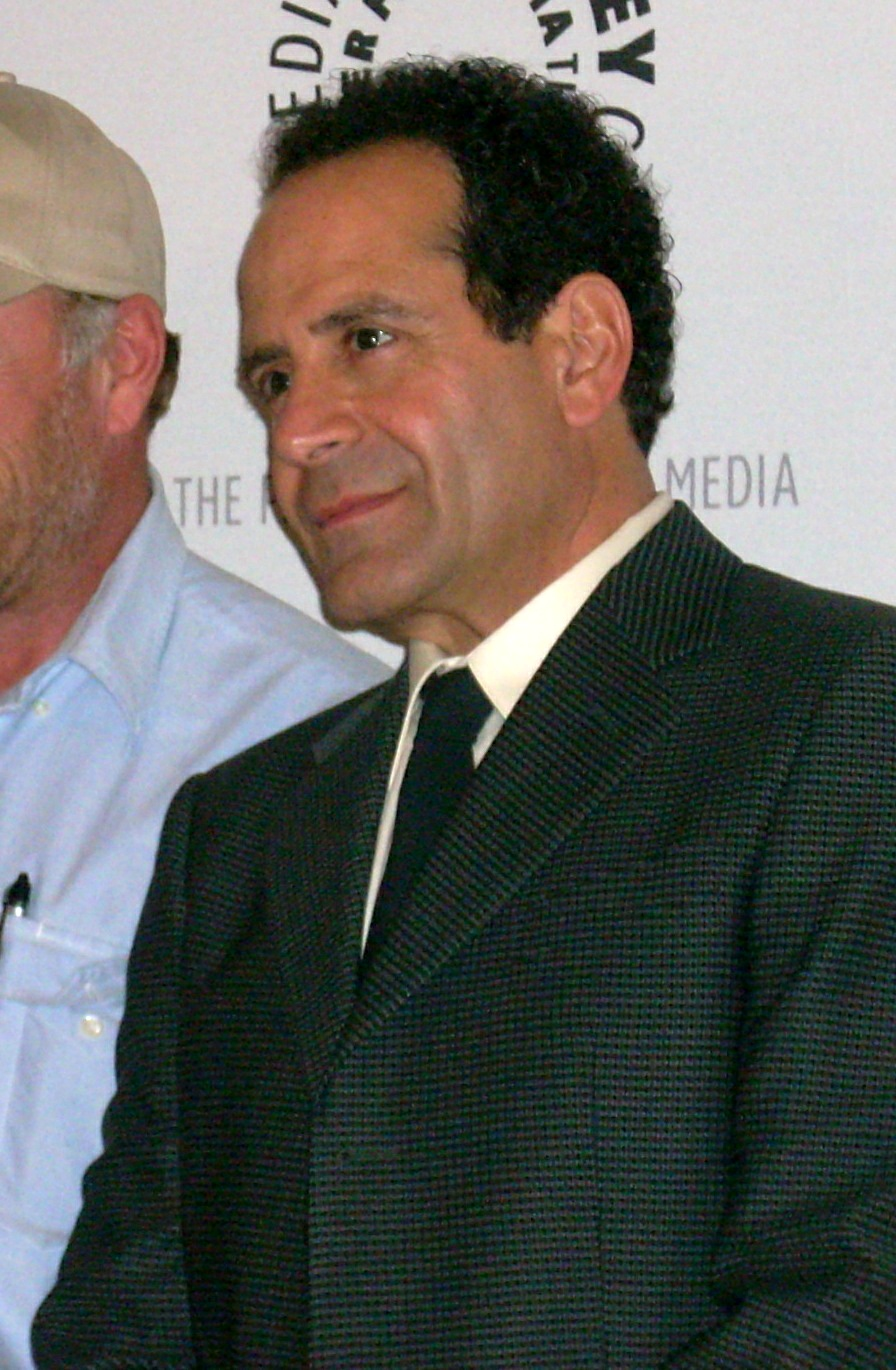
Tony Shalhoub, Outstanding Performance by a Male Actor in a Comedy Series winner

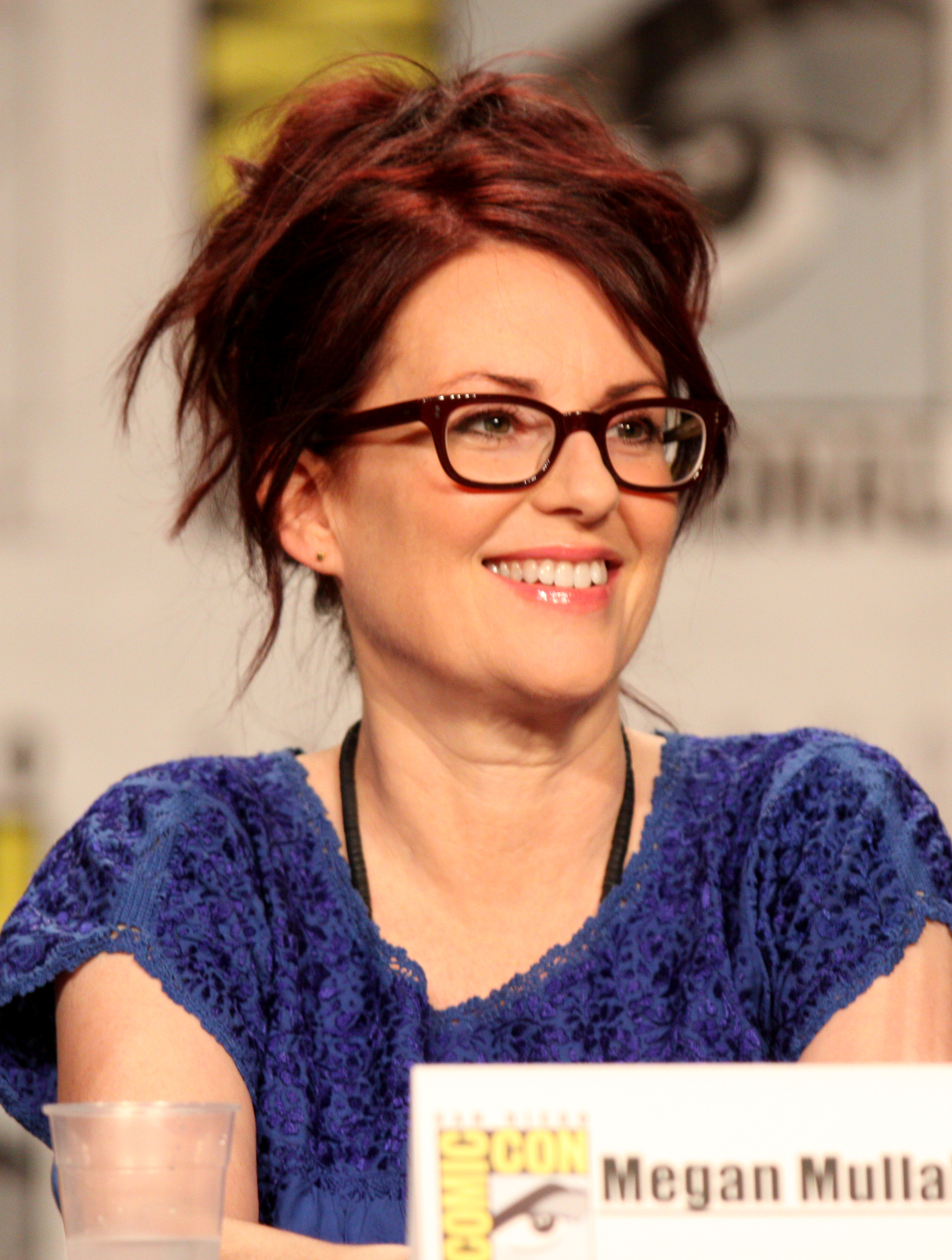
Megan Mullally, Outstanding Performance by a Female Actor in a Comedy Series winner

=== Film ===
Outstanding Performance by a Male Actor in a Leading Role	Outstanding Performance by a Female Actor in a Leading Role
**Johnny Depp – Pirates of the Caribbean: The Curse of the Black Pearl as Captain Jack Sparrow**; Peter Dinklage – The Station Agent as Finbar McBride; Ben Kingsley – House of Sand and Fog as Colonel Massoud Amir Behrani; Bill Murray – Lost in Translation as Bob Harris; Sean Penn – Mystic River as Jimmy Markum	**Charlize Theron – Monster as Aileen Wuornos**; Patricia Clarkson – The Station Agent as Olivia Harris; Diane Keaton – Something's Gotta Give as Erica Barry; Naomi Watts – 21 Grams as Cristina Peck; Evan Rachel Wood – Thirteen as Tracy Freeland
Outstanding Performance by a Male Actor in a Supporting Role	Outstanding Performance by a Female Actor in a Supporting Role
**Tim Robbins – Mystic River as Dave Boyle**; Alec Baldwin – The Cooler as Shelly Kaplow; Chris Cooper – Seabiscuit as Tom Smith; Benicio del Toro – 21 Grams as Jack Jordan; Ken Watanabe – The Last Samurai as Lord Moritsugu Katsumoto	**Renée Zellweger – Cold Mountain as Ruby Thewes**; Maria Bello – The Cooler as Natalie Belisario; Keisha Castle-Hughes – Whale Rider as Paikea Apirana; Patricia Clarkson – Pieces of April as Joy Burns; Holly Hunter – Thirteen as Melanie Freeland
Outstanding Performance by a Cast in a Motion Picture
**The Lord of the Rings: The Return of the King – Sean Astin, Sean Bean, Cate Blanchett, Orlando Bloom, Billy Boyd, Bernard Hill, Ian Holm, Ian McKellen, Dominic Monaghan, Viggo Mortensen, John Noble, Miranda Otto, John Rhys-Davies, Andy Serkis, Liv Tyler, Karl Urban, Hugo Weaving, David Wenham, and Elijah Wood**; In America – Emma Bolger, Sarah Bolger, Paddy Considine, Djimon Hounsou, and Samantha Morton; Mystic River – Kevin Bacon, Laurence Fishburne, Marcia Gay Harden, Laura Linney, Sean Penn, and Tim Robbins; Seabiscuit – Elizabeth Banks, Jeff Bridges, Chris Cooper, William H. Macy, Tobey Maguire, and Gary Stevens; The Station Agent – Paul Benjamin, Bobby Cannavale, Patricia Clarkson, Peter Dinklage, Raven Goodwin, and Michelle Williams

=== Television ===
Outstanding Performance by a Male Actor in a Miniseries or Television Movie	Outstanding Performance by a Female Actor in a Miniseries or Television Movie
**Al Pacino – Angels in America (HBO) as Roy Cohn**; Justin Kirk – Angels in America (HBO) as Prior Walter / Leatherman in the Park; Paul Newman – Our Town (Showtime) as Stage Manager; Forest Whitaker – Deacons for Defense (Showtime) as Marcus Clay; Jeffrey Wright – Angels in America (HBO) as Mr. Lies / Norman "Belize" Ariaga / Homeless Man / The Angel Europa / The Antarctic Eskimo	**Meryl Streep – Angels in America (HBO) as Hannah Pitt / Ethel Rosenberg / The Rabbi / The Angel Australia**; Anne Bancroft – The Roman Spring of Mrs. Stone (Showtime) as Contessa; Helen Mirren – The Roman Spring of Mrs. Stone (Showtime) as Karen Stone; Mary-Louise Parker – Angels in America (HBO) as Harper Pitt; Emma Thompson – Angels in America (HBO) as Nurse Emily / Homeless Woman / The Angel America
Outstanding Performance by a Male Actor in a Drama Series	Outstanding Performance by a Female Actor in a Drama Series
**Kiefer Sutherland – 24 (Fox) as Jack Bauer**; Peter Krause – Six Feet Under (HBO) as Nate Fisher; Anthony LaPaglia – Without a Trace (CBS) as Jack Malone; Martin Sheen – The West Wing (NBC) as Josiah "Jed" Bartlet; Treat Williams – Everwood (The WB) as Andrew "Andy" Brown	**Frances Conroy – Six Feet Under (HBO) as Ruth Fisher**; Stockard Channing – The West Wing (NBC) as Abigail "Abbey" Bartlet; Tyne Daly – Judging Amy (CBS) as Maxine Gray; Jennifer Garner – Alias (ABC) as Sydney Bristow; Mariska Hargitay – Law & Order: Special Victims Unit (NBC) as Det. Olivia Benson; Allison Janney – The West Wing (NBC) as C. J. Cregg
Outstanding Performance by a Male Actor in a Comedy Series	Outstanding Performance by a Female Actor in a Comedy Series
**Tony Shalhoub – Monk (USA Network) as Adrian Monk**; Peter Boyle – Everybody Loves Raymond (CBS) as Frank Barone; Brad Garrett – Everybody Loves Raymond (CBS) as Robert Barone; Sean Hayes – Will & Grace (NBC) as Jack McFarland; Ray Romano – Everybody Loves Raymond (CBS) as Ray Barone	**Megan Mullally – Will & Grace (NBC) as Karen Walker**; Patricia Heaton – Everybody Loves Raymond (CBS) as Debra Barone; Lisa Kudrow – Friends (NBC) as Phoebe Buffay; Debra Messing – Will & Grace (NBC) as Grace Adler; Doris Roberts – Everybody Loves Raymond (CBS) as Marie Barone
Outstanding Performance by an Ensemble in a Drama Series
**Six Feet Under (HBO) – Lauren Ambrose, Frances Conroy, Ben Foster, Rachel Griffiths, Michael C. Hall, Peter Krause, Peter Macdissi, Justina Machado, Freddy Rodriguez, Mathew St. Patrick, Lili Taylor, and Rainn Wilson**; CSI: Crime Scene Investigation (CBS) – Gary Dourdan, George Eads, Jorja Fox, Paul Guilfoyle, Robert David Hall, Marg Helgenberger, William Petersen, and Eric Szmanda; Law & Order (NBC) – Jesse L. Martin, S. Epatha Merkerson, Jerry Orbach, Elisabeth Röhm, Fred Thompson, and Sam Waterston; The West Wing (NBC) – Stockard Channing, Dulé Hill, Allison Janney, Joshua Malina, Janel Moloney, Richard Schiff, Martin Sheen, John Spencer, and Bradley Whitford; Without a Trace (CBS) – Eric Close, Marianne Jean-Baptiste, Anthony LaPaglia, Poppy Montgomery, and Enrique Murciano
Outstanding Performance by an Ensemble in a Comedy Series
**Sex and the City (HBO) – Kim Cattrall, Kristin Davis, Cynthia Nixon, and Sarah Jessica Parker**; Everybody Loves Raymond (CBS) – Peter Boyle, Brad Garrett, Patricia Heaton, Doris Roberts, Ray Romano, and Madylin Sweeten; Frasier (NBC) – Peri Gilpin, Kelsey Grammer, Jane Leeves, John Mahoney, and David Hyde Pierce; Friends (NBC) – Jennifer Aniston, Courteney Cox Arquette, Lisa Kudrow, Matt LeBlanc, Matthew Perry, and David Schwimmer; Will & Grace (NBC) – Sean Hayes, Eric McCormack, Debra Messing, and Megan Mullally

=== Screen Actors Guild Life Achievement Award ===
- Karl Malden

== Multiple nominations ==
=== Film ===
Nominations	Film
3	Mystic River
3	The Station Agent
2	21 Grams
2	The Cooler
2	Seabiscuit
2	Thirteen

=== Television ===
Nominations	Program
6	Angels in America
6	Everybody Loves Raymond
3	Six Feet Under
4	The West Wing
4	Will & Grace
2	Friends
2	The Roman Spring of Mrs. Stone
2	Without a Trace

== Multiple wins ==
=== Television ===
Wins	Program
2	Angels in America
2	Six Feet Under

== In Memoriam ==
The awards remember his members who died since the previous year's ceremony:

- Katharine Hepburn
- Rand Brooks
- Les Tremayne
- Madlyn Rhue
- Earl Hindman
- Ellen Drew
- Gene Anthony Ray
- Wendy Hiller
- Dorothy Loudon
- Frederick Coffin
- Graham Jarvis
- Kellie Waymire
- Fred Rogers
- Bob Keeshan
- Janice Rule
- Art Carney
- Jonathan Brandis
- Suzy Parker
- Fred Berry
- Uta Hagen
- Jack Elam
- Julie Parrish
- Gordon Jump
- Jack Paar
- Florence Stanley
- William Marshall
- Anthony Caruso
- Donald O'Connor
- Larry Hovis
- Robert Stack
- Gisele MacKenzie
- Horst Buchholz
- Michael Jeter
- Buddy Ebsen
- Hope Lange
- Buddy Hackett
- Ann Miller
- Johnny Cash
- Charles Bronson
- Penny Singleton
- David Hemmings
- Martha Scott
- Alan Bates
- Lynne Thigpen
- Hume Cronyn
- Jeanne Crain
- John Ritter
- Gregory Hines
- Bob Hope
- Gregory Peck
