= National Board of Review Awards 2003 =

Annual US film awards ceremony

75th NBR Awards

December 3, 2003

Best Film:
Mystic River

The 75th National Board of Review Awards, honoring the best in filmmaking in 2003, were given on 3 December 2003.

== Top 10 films ==
1. Mystic River
2. The Last Samurai
3. The Station Agent
4. 21 Grams
5. House of Sand and Fog
6. Lost in Translation
7. Cold Mountain
8. In America
9. Seabiscuit
10. Master and Commander: The Far Side of the World

== Top Foreign Films ==
1. The Barbarian Invasions
2. The Best of Youth
3. Monsieur Ibrahim
4. Autumn Spring
5. Man on the Train

== Top Five Documentaries ==
1. The Fog of War
2. Capturing the Friedmans
3. My Architect
4. Winged Migration
5. Spellbound

== Winners ==
- Best Film:
  - Mystic River
- Best Foreign Language Film:
  - Les invasions barbares (The Barbarian Invasions), Canada/France
- Best Actor:
  - Sean Penn - 21 Grams and Mystic River
- Best Actress:
  - Diane Keaton - Something's Gotta Give
- Best Supporting Actor:
  - Alec Baldwin - The Cooler
- Best Supporting Actress:
  - Patricia Clarkson - Pieces of April and The Station Agent
- Best Acting by an Ensemble:
  - The Lord of the Rings: The Return of the King
- Breakthrough Performance Actor:
  - Paul Giamatti - American Splendor
- Breakthrough Performance Actress:
  - Charlize Theron - Monster
- Best Director:
  - Edward Zwick - The Last Samurai
- Outstanding Directorial Debut:
  - Vadim Perelman - House of Sand and Fog
- Best Screenplay (Adapted):
  - Anthony Minghella - Cold Mountain
- Best Screenplay (Original)
  - Jim Sheridan, Naomi Sheridan and Kirsten Sherdian - In America
- Best Documentary Feature:
  - The Fog of War
- Best Animated Feature:
  - Finding Nemo
- Best Film or Mini-Series Made for Cable TV:
  - Angels in America
- Career Achievement Award:
  - Morgan Freeman
- Billy Wilder Award For Excellence In Directing:
  - Norman Jewison
- Special Filmmaking Achievement:
  - Sofia Coppola, for writing, directing, and producing Lost in Translation
- Career Achievement - Music Composition:
  - Hans Zimmer
- Career Achievement - Cinematography:
  - John Toll
- William K. Everson Award For Film History:
  - Richard LaGravenese and Ted Demme, A Decade Under the Influence
- Producers Award:
  - Gale Anne Hurd
  - Kathleen Kennedy
  - Christine Vachon
- Freedom Of Expression:
  - Capturing the Friedmans
  - Dirty Pretty Things
  - The Magdalene Sisters
  - 11'9"01 September 11
- Special Recognition For Excellence In Filmmaking:
  - American Splendor
  - Bend It Like Beckham
  - The Cooler
  - Dirty Pretty Things
  - Girl with a Pearl Earring
  - Pieces of April
  - The Secret Lives of Dentists
  - Shattered Glass
  - The Statement
  - Thirteen
  - Whale Rider
