= Florida Film Critics Circle Award for Best Supporting Actress =

Annual US film award

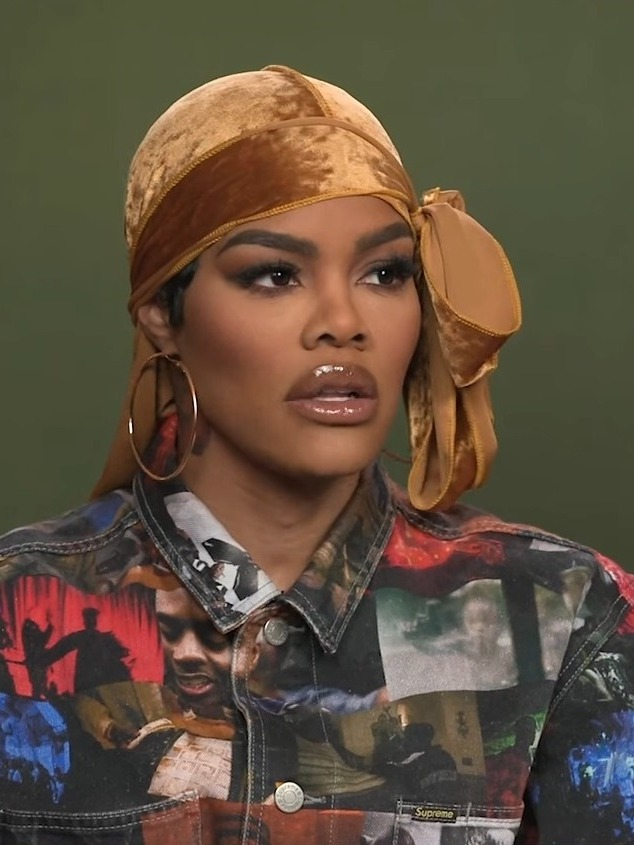
- The 2025 recipient: Teyana Taylor
- Awarded for: Best Performance by an Actress in a Supporting Role
- Country: United States
- Presented by: Florida Film Critics Circle
- First award: Courtney Love; The People vs. Larry Flynt (1996)
- Currently held by: Teyana Taylor; One Battle After Another (2025)
- Website: floridafilmcritics.com

The Florida Film Critics Circle Award for Best Supporting Actress is an award given by the Florida Film Critics Circle. It is given in honor of an actress who has delivered an outstanding performance in a supporting role.

== Winners ==
- † = Winner of the Academy Award for Best Supporting Actress

=== 1990s ===
Year	Winner	Film	Role
1996	Courtney Love	The People vs. Larry Flynt	Althea Leasure-Flynt
1997	Julianne Moore	Boogie Nights	Amber Waves
1998	Christina Ricci	Buffalo '66	Layla
1998	Christina Ricci	The Opposite of Sex	Dede Truitt
1998	Christina Ricci	Pecker	Shelley
1999	Catherine Keener	Being John Malkovich	Maxine Lund

=== 2000s ===
Year	Winner	Film	Role
2000	Frances McDormand	Almost Famous	Elaine Miller
2000	Frances McDormand	Wonder Boys	Sara Gaskell
2001	Cate Blanchett	Bandits	Kate Wheeler
2001	Cate Blanchett	The Lord of the Rings: The Fellowship of the Ring	Galadriel
2001	Cate Blanchett	The Man Who Cried	Lola
2001	Cate Blanchett	The Shipping News	Petal Quoyle
2002	Meryl Streep	Adaptation.	Susan Orlean
2003	Patricia Clarkson	Pieces of April	Joy Burns
2003	Patricia Clarkson	The Station Agent	Olivia Harris
2004	Laura Linney	Kinsey	Clara McMillen-Kinsey
2005	Amy Adams	Junebug	Ashley Johnsten
2006	Cate Blanchett	Notes on a Scandal	Sheba Hart
2007	Amy Ryan	Gone Baby Gone	Helene McCready
2008	Marisa Tomei	The Wrestler	Pam / Cassidy
2009	Mo'Nique †	Precious	Mary Lee Johnston

=== 2010s ===
Year	Nominee	Film	Role
2010	Melissa Leo †	The Fighter	Alice Eklund
2011	Shailene Woodley	The Descendants	Alexandra King
2012	Anne Hathaway †	Les Misérables	Fantine
2013	Lupita Nyong'o †	12 Years a Slave	Patsey
2014	Patricia Arquette †	Boyhood	Olivia Evans
2015	Kristen Stewart	Clouds of Sils Maria	Valentine
2016	Michelle Williams	Manchester by the Sea	Randi Chandler
2017	Allison Janney †	I, Tonya	LaVona Golden
2018	Sakura Ando	Shoplifters	Nobuyo Shibata
2019	Laura Dern †	Marriage Story	Nora Fanshaw

=== 2020s ===
Year	Nominee	Film	Role
2020	Maria Bakalova	Borat Subsequent Moviefilm	Tutar Sagdiyev
2021	Ariana DeBose †	West Side Story	Anita
2022	Jessie Buckley	Women Talking	Mariche
2022	Nina Hoss	Tár	Sharon Goodnow
2023	Rachel McAdams	Are You There God? It's Me, Margaret.	Barbara Simon
2024	Zoe Saldaña †	Emilia Pérez	Rita Mora Castro
2025	Teyana Taylor	One Battle After Another	Perfidia Beverly Hills

== Multiple winners ==
=== 2 wins ===
- Cate Blanchett (2001, 2006)
