= Boston Society of Film Critics Award for Best Supporting Actress =

Annual US film award

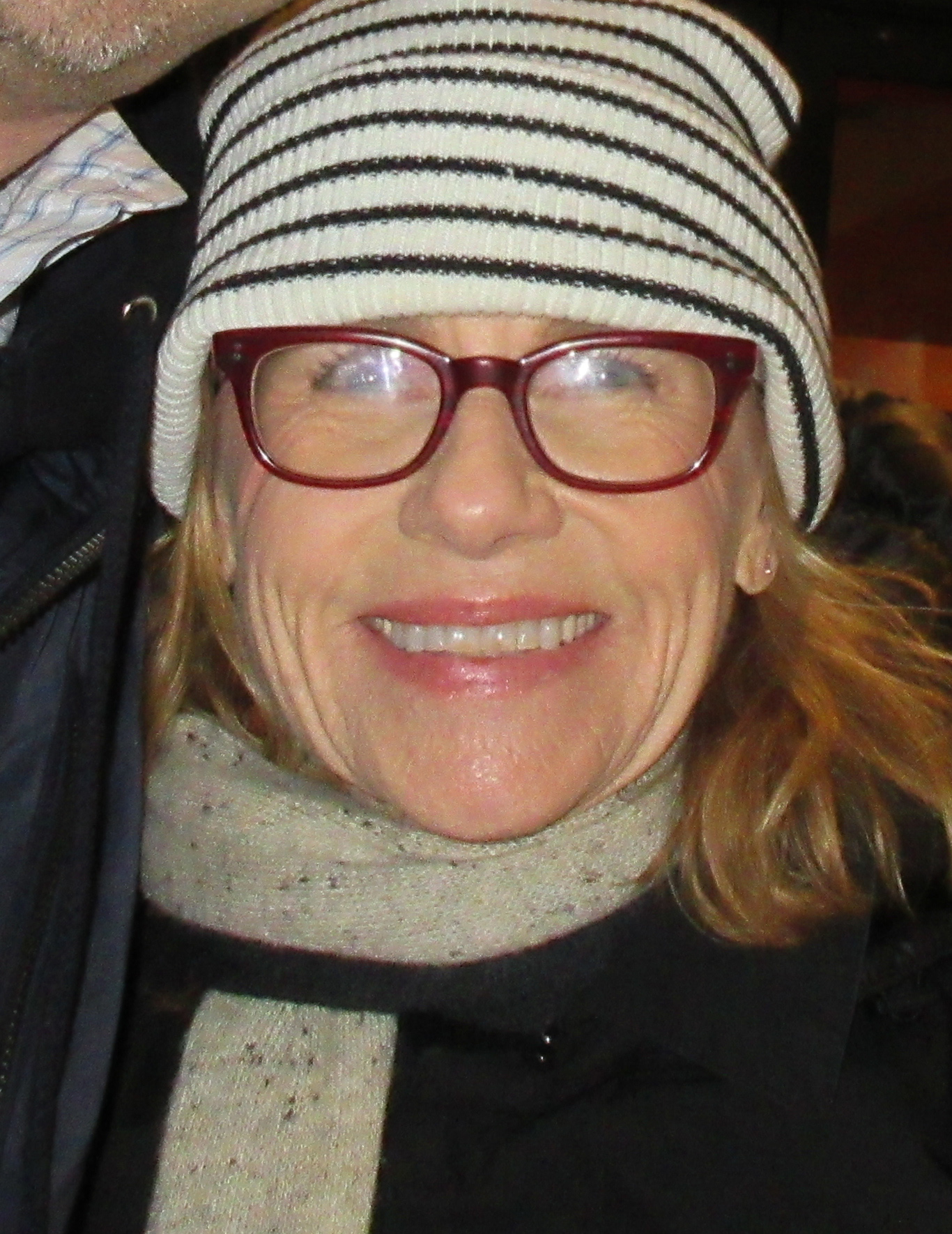
- Current recipient: Amy Madigan
- Awarded for: Best Performance by an Actress in a Supporting Role
- Country: United States
- Presented by: Boston Society of Film Critics
- First award: Mary Steenburgen; Melvin and Howard (1980)
- Currently held by: Amy Madigan; Weapons (2025)
- Website: bostonfilmcritics.org

The Boston Society of Film Critics Award for Best Supporting Actress is one of the annual film awards given by the Boston Society of Film Critics.

== Winners ==
=== 1980s ===
Year	Winner	Film	Role
1980	Mary Steenburgen	Melvin and Howard	Lynda West Dummar
1981	Mona Washbourne	Stevie	Aunt
1982	Jessica Lange	Tootsie	Julie Nichols
1983	Linda Hunt	The Year of Living Dangerously	Billy Kwan
1984	Peggy Ashcroft	A Passage to India	Mrs. Moore
1985	Anjelica Huston	Prizzi's Honor	Maerose Prizzi
1986	Dianne Wiest	Hannah and Her Sisters	Holly
1987	Kathy Baker	Street Smart	Punchy
1988	Joan Cusack	Married to the Mob	Rose
1988	Joan Cusack	Stars and Bars	Irene Stein
1988	Joan Cusack	Working Girl	Cynthia
1989	Brenda Fricker	My Left Foot	Bridget Brown

=== 1990s ===
Year	Winner	Film	Role
1990	Jennifer Jason Leigh	Last Exit to Brooklyn	Tralala
1990	Jennifer Jason Leigh	Miami Blues	Susie Waggoner
1991	Mercedes Ruehl	The Fisher King	Anne Napolitano
1992	Judy Davis	Husbands and Wives	Sally
1992	Judy Davis	Where Angels Fear to Tread	Harriet Herriton
1993	Rosie Perez	Fearless	Carla Rodrigo
1994	Kirsten Dunst	Interview with the Vampire	Claudia
1994	Kirsten Dunst	Little Women	Amy March (Young)
1995	Joan Allen	Nixon	Pat Nixon
1996	Courtney Love	The People vs. Larry Flynt	Althea Leasure
1997	Sarah Polley	The Sweet Hereafter	Nicole Burnell
1998	Joan Allen	Pleasantville	Betty Parker
1999	Chloë Sevigny	Boys Don't Cry	Lana Tisdel

=== 2000s ===
Year	Winner	Film	Role
2000	Frances McDormand	Almost Famous	Elaine Miller
2000	Frances McDormand	Wonder Boys	Chancellor Sara Gaskell
2001	Cameron Diaz	Vanilla Sky	Julianna “Julie” Gianni
2002	Toni Collette	About a Boy	Fiona Brewer
2002	Toni Collette	The Hours	Kitty
2003	Patricia Clarkson	Pieces of April	Joy Burns
2003	Patricia Clarkson	The Station Agent	Olivia Harris
2004	Laura Dern	We Don't Live Here Anymore	Terry Linden
2004	Sharon Warren	Ray	Aretha Robinson
2005	Catherine Keener	The 40-Year-Old Virgin	Trish Piedmont
2005	Catherine Keener	The Ballad of Jack and Rose	Kathleen
2005	Catherine Keener	Capote	Nelle Harper Lee
2006	Shareeka Epps	Half Nelson	Drey
2007	Amy Ryan	Gone Baby Gone	Helene McCready
2008	Penélope Cruz	Vicky Cristina Barcelona	María Elena
2009	Mo'Nique	Precious	Mary Lee Johnston

=== 2010s ===
Year	Winner	Film	Role
2010	Juliette Lewis	Conviction	Roseanna Perry
2011	Melissa McCarthy	Bridesmaids	Megan Price
2012	Sally Field	Lincoln	Mary Todd Lincoln
2013	June Squibb	Nebraska	Kate Grant
2014	Emma Stone	Birdman	Sam Thomson
2015	Kristen Stewart	Clouds of Sils Maria	Valentine
2016	Lily Gladstone	Certain Women	Jamie
2017	Laurie Metcalf	Lady Bird	Marion McPherson
2018	Regina King	If Beale Street Could Talk	Sharon Rivers
2019	Laura Dern	Marriage Story	Nora Fanshaw

=== 2020s ===
Year	Winner	Film	Role
2020	Youn Yuh-jung	Minari	Soon-ja
2021	Jessie Buckley	The Lost Daughter	Young Leda Caruso
2022	Kerry Condon	The Banshees of Inisherin	Siobhán Súilleabháin
2023	Da'Vine Joy Randolph	The Holdovers	Mary Lamb
2024	Danielle Deadwyler	The Piano Lesson	Berniece
2025	Amy Madigan	Weapons	Gladys
