= Kathryn Tucker (producer) =

American film producer

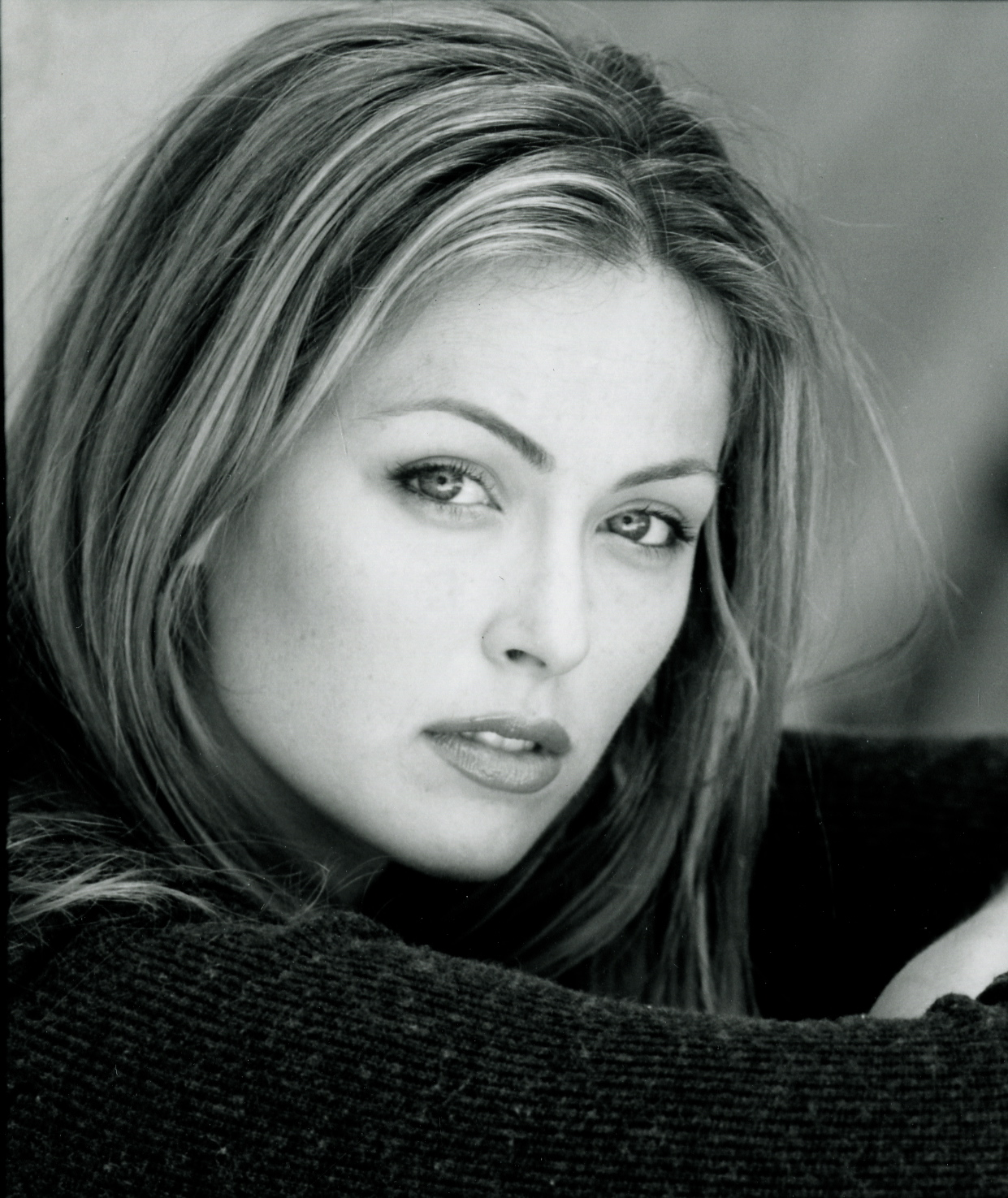
- Kathryn Tucker
- Education: Tulane University
- Occupations: Entrepreneur; film producer

Kathryn Tucker is an American film producer and entrepreneur based in New York City. She is the winner of the Independent Spirit John Cassavetes Award for The Station Agent (2003) and founder of the RedRover social network.

She graduated cum laude with a degree in philosophy from Tulane University and won a Thomas J. Watson Fellowship in 1993 and 1994. After co-producing a number of movies for SenArt Films in the early 2000s, she developed RedRover as an event planning and social media app aimed at parents.

== Filmography ==
- Youssou N'Dour: I Bring What I Love (2008) (executive producer)
- The Station Agent (2003) (producer)
- The Fog of War: Eleven Lessons from the Life of Robert S. McNamara (2003) (special thanks)
- Stevie (2002) (associate producer)
- Happy Accidents (2000) (actress)
