= Pieces of April =

2003 American comedy-drama film directed by Peter Hedges

- Theatrical release poster
- Directed by: Peter Hedges
- Written by: Peter Hedges
- Produced by: Gary Winick
- Starring: Katie Holmes; Patricia Clarkson; Derek Luke; Alison Pill; Sean Hayes; Oliver Platt; Sisqo
- Cinematography: Tami Reiker
- Edited by: Mark Livolsi
- Music by: Stephin Merritt
- Production companies: IFC Productions; InDigEnt Productions; Kalkaska Productions
- Distributed by: United Artists (through MGM Distribution Co.)
- Release date: October 17, 2003
- Running time: 80 minutes
- Country: United States
- Language: English
- Budget: $300,000
- Box office: $3.3 million

Pieces of April is a 2003 American comedy-drama film written and directed by Peter Hedges. Marking Hedges' directorial debut, the film stars Katie Holmes, Derek Luke, Sean Hayes, Alison Pill, Oliver Platt and Patricia Clarkson. The film follows April (Holmes), as she attempts to prepare a Thanksgiving dinner for her estranged family.

The film premiered at the 2003 Sundance Film Festival, and received mostly positive reviews. It grossed over US$3.2 million worldwide on a $300,000 budget. Patricia Clarkson received numerous nominations for Best Supporting Actress for her role, including at the Academy Awards and the Golden Globe Awards, and also won multiple Best Supporting Actress awards given by associations of film critics.

== Plot ==
April Burns, the eldest daughter in a highly dysfunctional family, lives in a small tenement apartment on the Lower East Side of Manhattan with her boyfriend Bobby. Although estranged from her parents, Jim and Joy, and younger siblings Beth and Timmy, she opts to invite them for Thanksgiving dinner. It is expected to be the last Thanksgiving for Joy, who is dying from breast cancer.

April's parents and siblings, along with April's senile grandmother, start a long drive from suburbia to New York City, while April prepares to cook dinner. Bobby leaves the apartment to purchase a suit so he can make a good impression upon meeting April's family. Upon attempting to cook the Thanksgiving turkey, April discovers that her oven is broken, and solicits help from other people in her apartment building; she receives help, hindrance, and indifference from the disparate group of residents, but eventually completes the meal.

As April's family makes the road trip, their dysfunctional relationship with her is discussed. Beth constantly expresses her disapproval of visiting April, while Joy is pessimistic about the prospect of the dinner being enjoyable. Jim remains positive, and Timmy takes photographs of their trip. Frequent stops have to be made as Joy is sick.

After initial difficulty, Bobby finds a suit and begins heading home, only to be confronted by April's former boyfriend, a drug dealer named Tyrone. A fight ensues, ruining Bobby's suit jacket and leaving his face bloody. April's family arrives outside her derelict apartment building. Initially hesitant to leave their car due to the poverty of the neighborhood, they are then approached by a battered Bobby, who introduces himself. Her family subsequently leaves, opting to purchase a meal at a diner instead. April is crestfallen after learning the news.

After witnessing a confrontation between a mother and her young daughter in the diner's bathroom, Joy reconsiders. Along with Timmy, the pair ask two motorcycle riders to take them back to April's apartment. April has since decided to share her Thanksgiving meal with several residents of her apartment building who helped her prepare it. Joy proceeds to April's apartment, where the two have an emotional reunion, photographed by Timmy. The rest of April's family later arrives, and all embrace her. April's family, together with the residents of the building, are shown having an enjoyable time.

== Cast ==
- Katie Holmes as April Burns
- Derek Luke as Bobby
- Oliver Platt as Jim Burns
- Patricia Clarkson as Joy Burns
- Alison Pill as Beth Burns
- John Gallagher Jr. as Timmy Burns
- Alice Drummond as Grandma Dottie
- Sean Hayes as Wayne
- Isiah Whitlock Jr. as Eugene
- Lillias White as Evette
- Leila Danette as Woman in Stairwell
- Sisqó as Latrell
- Adrian Martinez as Man in Mohair Sweater
- Armando Riesco as Tyrone

== Themes ==
Pieces of April explores themes of 'racing against time', evidenced by Joy's cancer and that it is expected to be the last Thanksgiving with her alive. This theme is reinforced by April's race to get dinner cooked in time and by Bobby's search to find a suit and return home. Writer/director Peter Hedges' screenplays are renowned for having themes of humanity and truth; interviewed regarding the film, Hedges said he does not write stories to help people escape life, but rather to help them embrace it. Hedges said he hoped the film would trigger something in people, either to take action or reflect on their own lives.

== Production ==
=== Pre-production ===
Hedges started working on the script for Pieces of April about eight or nine years before the film was released, though eventually forgot about the project. After his mother was diagnosed with cancer, she encouraged him to continue writing. Hedges went looking through his old drafts and remembered that the mother in Pieces of April also has cancer. After telling his own mother of this, she told him it sounded like a project he should work on. Hedges says he only began putting serious effort into the script after his mother had died. He said that while the film was not autobiographical, it was definitely impacted by his mother's death, concluding that he wanted to make a film that was not about her, but instead a tribute to her; the film is dedicated to her memory. Hedges was additionally inspired by a true story about a group of friends who had "borrowed" an apartment to prepare a Thanksgiving dinner. When they went to cook their turkey they discovered their oven did not work, so had to go door to door in the building to try and use one of their neighbors'. Pieces of April was in pre-production on three occasions, each time with a budget of around $7 million, though attempts to get the film off the ground repeatedly failed. The fourth time Hedges attempted to get the film developed, he took it to independent company InDigEnt, who signed it immediately, albeit on a much smaller budget of $300,000.

=== Casting ===
Katie Holmes had always agreed to play the lead role; Hedges said he thought she was drawn to the role as it differed so much from characters she had previously portrayed. Oliver Platt and Patricia Clarkson had already agreed to work on the film the third time it was in pre-production with a budget of $7 million, though were happy to remain on board with the reduced wages the new budget offered, which only gave cast and crew $200 and $100 a day respectively; Hedges was paid $10 to write and another $10 to direct the film. Sean Hayes called Hedges from the set of Will & Grace, asking for the part of Bobby. Hedges explained that Bobby was to be African-American, and instead suggested the role of Wayne. Hayes asked if he could fly to New York to audition, at which point Hedges informed him there was no need as he was already hired. Sisqó also originally applied for the role of Bobby, though Hedges did not think he was suited to the role as he was shorter than Holmes, and instead suggested he play Latrell. Derek Luke was the last person to audition for Bobby, and Hedges was so impressed with his performance he hired him immediately.

=== Filming ===
Pieces of April was filmed in 16 days. Due to the tight schedule many locations, such as the Burns family home and the Salvation Army store, were only available for a single day. Due to time limitations, some scenes showing the Burns family driving to visit April were actually shot while the actors were driving to additional filming locations. Two apartments in New York were used for filming, one for shots of hallways and stairs and one for the inside of apartments. Some original residents of the apartments were used as extras. Filming was often challenging as the spaces to work in were small. Pieces of April was shot digitally with hand-held cameras, and almost exclusively used close and medium shots due to limitations in resolution in wide digital shots at the time. Many scenes were filmed with two cameras at the same time, allowing them to be filmed in one take.

=== Soundtrack ===
The film's title is taken from a 1972 song of the same name by Three Dog Night. Hedges had intended to use the song at the end of the film, though Stephin Merritt, who was hired for the film's score, advised him against doing so. Hedges instead asked Merritt to compose an original song to close the film. Merritt's soundtrack to the film was released on Nonesuch Records on November 4, 2003 to mostly favorable reviews.

== Reception ==
=== Initial screening and box office ===
Pieces of April debuted at the 2003 Sundance Film Festival. Following its positive reception there, the rights to the film were reported to be in a bidding war with companies including Miramax, Fine Line Features and Artisan Entertainment. United Artists ended up securing the worldwide release rights from Cinetic Media in January 2003.

The film earned over $2.5 million domestically and a further $743,364 internationally for a total gross of over $3.2 million.

=== Critical response ===
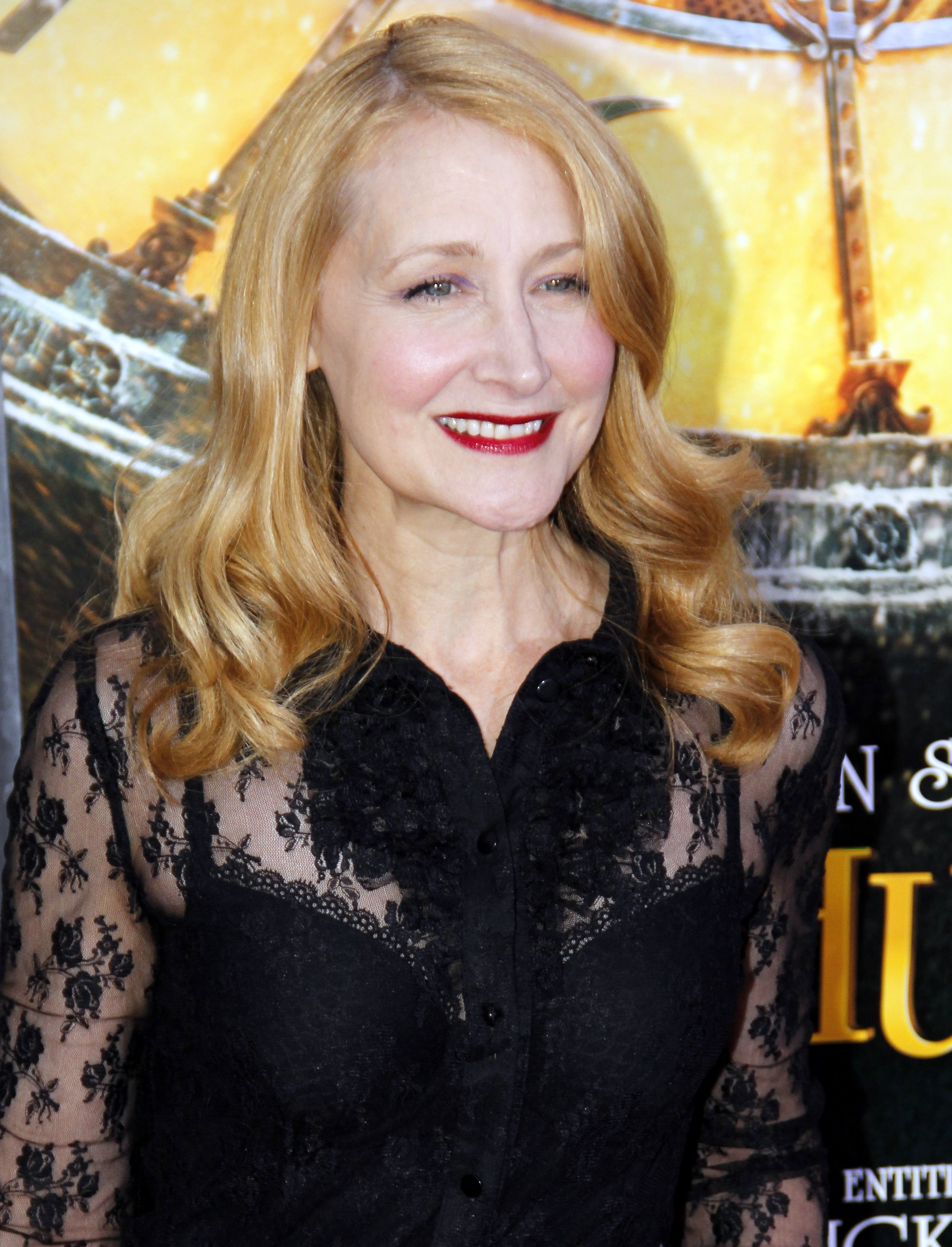
Patricia Clarkson's performance received praise from critics.

The review aggregator Rotten Tomatoes gives the film an approval rating of 84% based on reviews from 153 critics, with an average rating of 7.12/10. The site's critical consensus reads, "Pieces of April transcends its small-scale setting and budget with endearing performances, playful humor, and genuine sweetness, resulting in a touching holiday treat." Metacritic assigned the film a weighted average score of 70 out of 100, based on 36 critics, indicating "generally favorable reviews".

Elvis Mitchell of The New York Times called the film an "intelligent and touching farce" and added, "Mr. Hedges dances from one vignette to another with a mouthwatering finesse." Roger Ebert gave the film three out of four stars, praising its humor and quirkiness and describing it as "well-intentioned in its screwy way, with flashes of human insight, and actors who can take a moment and make it glow." Peter Travers of Rolling Stone also rated it three stars out of four, praising Holmes for her performance which he described as holding the film together, while Carla Meyer of the San Francisco Chronicle called the film "both heartfelt and tough-minded", praising Holmes and describing Clarkson's performance as "her finest among about 100 fine Clarkson performances in the past few years".

One of the film's few less-favorable reviews came from Entertainment Weekly who gave it a 'C', calling it a "glib comedy" and adding, "Hedges shoves his characters into sitcom slots and seals them there."

=== Awards and nominations ===
Pieces of April was nominated for Best Foreign Independent Film at the 2004 British Independent Film Awards, though lost to South Korean film Oldboy. Peter Hedges was nominated for Best Screenplay at the 19th Independent Spirit Awards and also the Humanitas Prize at the 29th Humanitas Awards. He won both the Audience Choice Award and the FIPRESCI Prize at the 2003 Chicago International Film Festival.

Patricia Clarkson received numerous best supporting actress nominations for her role, including at the 76th Academy Awards, the 61st Golden Globe Awards, the 10th Screen Actors Guild Awards. and the 19th Independent Spirit Awards. In 2003, she won in that category at the Boston Society of Film Critics Awards, the Chicago Film Critics Association Awards, the National Board of Review Awards and the San Francisco Film Critics Circle Awards, and in 2004, she won it at the Florida Film Critics Circle Awards, the National Society of Film Critics Awards, and the Satellite Awards. She also won the 'Special Jury Prize for Outstanding Dramatic Performance' award at the 2003 Sundance Film Festival, for her roles in Pieces of April, and also The Station Agent and All the Real Girls.

Year	Event	Award	Nominee	Result	Ref.
2004	Academy Awards	Best Supporting Actress	Patricia Clarkson	Nominated	
2004	Golden Globe Awards	Best Supporting Actress – Motion Picture	Patricia Clarkson	Nominated	
2004	Screen Actors Guild Awards	Outstanding Performance by a Female Actor in a Supporting Role	Patricia Clarkson	Nominated	
2003	Boston Society of Film Critics Awards	Best Supporting Actress	Patricia Clarkson	Won	
2004	Chicago Film Critics Association Awards	Best Supporting Actress	Patricia Clarkson	Won	
2003	Sundance Film Festival	Special Jury Prize for Outstanding Dramatic Performance	Patricia Clarkson	Won	
2004	Florida Film Critics Circle Awards	Best Supporting Actress	Patricia Clarkson	Won	
2003	National Board of Review Awards	Best Supporting Actress	Patricia Clarkson	Won	
2004	National Society of Film Critics Awards	Best Supporting Actress	Patricia Clarkson	Won	
2003	San Francisco Film Critics Circle Awards	Best Supporting Actress	Patricia Clarkson	Won	
2004	Satellite Awards	Best Supporting Actress – Motion Picture	Patricia Clarkson	Won	
2004	Independent Spirit Awards	Best Supporting Actress	Patricia Clarkson	Nominated	
2004	Independent Spirit Awards	Best Screenplay	Peter Hedges	Nominated	
2004	Humanitas Award	Humanitas Prize	Peter Hedges	Nominated	
2003	Chicago International Film Festival	Audience Choice Award	Peter Hedges	Won	
2003	Chicago International Film Festival	FIPRESCI Prize	Peter Hedges	Won	
2004	British Independent Film Award	Best Foreign Film	Pieces of April	Nominated	
