= Patricia Clarkson =

American actress (born 1959)

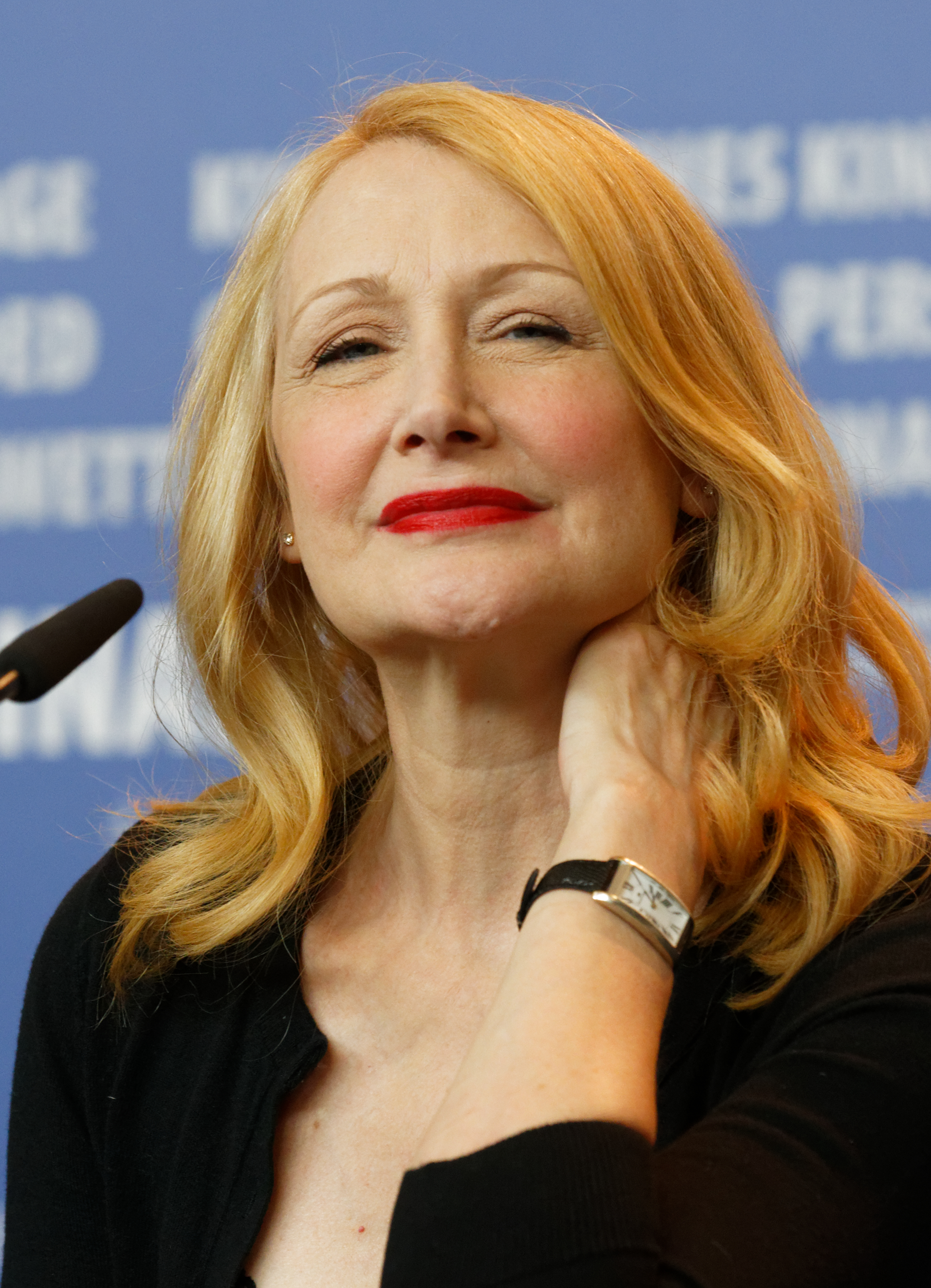
- Clarkson in 2017
- Born: Patricia Davies Clarkson; December 29, 1959 (age 66); New Orleans, Louisiana, U.S.
- Education: Fordham University (BA); Yale University (MFA)
- Occupation: Actress
- Years active: 1985–present
- Works: Full list
- Mother: Jackie Clarkson
- Awards: Full list

Patricia Davies Clarkson (born December 29, 1959) is an American actress. She has starred in numerous leading and supporting roles in a variety of films ranging from independent film features to major film studio productions. Her accolades include a Golden Globe Award and three Primetime Emmy Awards, in addition to nominations for an Academy Award and a Tony Award.

Clarkson studied acting at the Yale School of Drama before making her feature film debut in Brian De Palma's mob drama The Untouchables (1987). She acted in a string of films including The Dead Pool (1988), Jumanji (1995), High Art (1998), The Green Mile (1999), The Pledge (2001), Far from Heaven (2002), and Dogville (2003). In 2003 she gained acclaim for her portrayals of a cancer-stricken matriarch who reunites with her daughter in Pieces of April (2003), for which she was nominated for the Academy Award for Best Supporting Actress, and an artist grappling with the death of her son in The Station Agent (2003), which earned her a nomination for the Screen Actors Guild Award for Outstanding Actress in a Leading Role.

She later expanded her career taking roles in numerous films acting in dramas such as Good Night, and Good Luck (2005), All the King's Men (2006), Elegy (2008), Shutter Island (2010), The Party (2017), Monica (2022), and She Said (2022) as well as the comedy films Lars and the Real Girl (2007), Vicky Cristina Barcelona (2008), Whatever Works (2009), Easy A (2010), Friends with Benefits (2011), and Learning to Drive (2014). She also portrayed the villainous Ava Paige in the dystopian science-fiction film series Maze Runner from 2014 to 2018.

On television, she took a recurring guest role on the HBO series Six Feet Under (2002–2005) earning two Primetime Emmy Awards. She is also known for her recurring roles in the NBC sitcoms Frasier and Parks and Recreation and the Netflix political drama series House of Cards. For her role in the HBO limited series Sharp Objects (2018), she earned a Golden Globe Award as well as nominations for a Primetime Emmy Award, and Screen Actors Guild Award. She played an outspoken wife in the BBC series State of the Union (2022), earning another Primetime Emmy Award.

On stage, Clarkson made her Broadway debut as a replacement in the John Guare play The House of Blue Leaves (1986). She returned to Broadway playing a Wall Street investment counselor in the Richard Greenberg play Eastern Standard (1989), and Mrs. Kendal in the revival of the Bernard Pomerance play The Elephant Man (2014), the later of which earned her a nomination for the Tony Award for Best Featured Actress in a Play. She reprised the role at the Theatre Royal Haymarket in 2015 in her West End debut. She later featured in a West End revival of the Eugene O'Neill play Long Day's Journey into Night (2024).

== Early life ==
Clarkson was born on December 29, 1959, in New Orleans, Louisiana, the daughter of Jackie Clarkson (née Brechtel), a New Orleans politician and councilwoman, and Arthur "Buzz" Clarkson, a school administrator who worked at the Louisiana State University School of Medicine. Clarkson's maternal great-grandmother was a Lithuanian-Jewish immigrant who settled in New Orleans, while her maternal great-grandfather emigrated from Spain. Her mother's ancestry also includes Irish and German, while Clarkson's father was of English, Scottish, and Welsh descent.

She is one of five sisters, all of whom attended O. Perry Walker High School, where she graduated in 1977. She was raised in Algiers, a section of New Orleans on the West Bank of the Mississippi River.

From 1977 to 1979, Clarkson studied speech pathology at Louisiana State University before deciding she wanted to pursue a drama degree. In 1980, she transferred to Fordham University in New York City to enroll in their undergraduate acting program, from which she graduated summa cum laude in 1982. She then earned her Master of Fine Arts at the Yale School of Drama in 1985.

== Career ==
=== Early work ===
After graduating from the Yale School of Drama, Clarkson was cast in a 1986 Broadway production of The House of Blue Leaves as a replacement in the role of Corrinna Stroller. The following year, she made her feature film debut in Brian De Palma's The Untouchables (1987), portraying Catherine Ness, the wife of US Treasury Prohibition agent Eliot Ness (Kevin Costner). Clarkson stated she was struggling financially at the time, paying student loans, and De Palma expanded her role in the film; she originally had only several days of shooting. The next year, she played opposite Clint Eastwood in The Dead Pool (1988), the fifth installment in the Dirty Harry film series.

Clarkson returned to Broadway in 1989 in Eastern Standard, portraying a Wall Street investment counselor whose brother (played by Kevin Conroy) is diagnosed with AIDS; the play ran from January to March of that year.

Clarkson has stated that in the early 1990s, she went through a turbulent period in her career and was unable to find significant work. She had a small role in Jumanji (1995) before being cast in the independent drama High Art (1998), portraying a drug-addicted German actress in New York City. Her performance earned her an Independent Spirit Award nomination for Best Supporting Actress.

In 1998, Clarkson had a small role in the critically acclaimed independent romantic comedy Playing by Heart, portraying a woman at a bar who listens to a false story told by a man (Dennis Quaid) as part of his improv class. In 1999, Clarkson appeared in a supporting role as an ailing wife of a prison warden in The Green Mile, which was nominated for a Screen Actors Guild Award for Best Ensemble Cast. The same year, she had a supporting part in the romantic comedy Simply Irresistible (1999), followed by a supporting part in Stanley Tucci's biopic Joe Gould's Secret (2000). Next, she portrayed a single mother in the drama The Safety of Objects (2001), and had a supporting role opposite Jack Nicholson in the Sean Penn-directed thriller The Pledge (2001), playing the mother of a murder victim. She also had a leading role in the independent horror film Wendigo (2001), directed by Larry Fessenden, and in the comedy Welcome to Collinwood (2002). Roger Ebert praised the performances in the former, noting: "The actors [in Wendigo] have an unforced, natural quality that looks easy but is hard to do." In 2001 she had a recurring role on Frasier as Claire French, who dated Frasier Crane, played by Kelsey Grammer.

=== Critical breakthrough ===
In 2002, Clarkson was cast in a supporting role in Todd Haynes's period drama Far from Heaven, opposite Julianne Moore and Dennis Quaid, playing the neighbor of a repressed housewife in the 1950s. The same year, she starred as Margaret White in the television film adaptation of Stephen King's Carrie. Between 2002 and 2005, Clarkson had a guest-starring role on the HBO drama series Six Feet Under, playing Sarah O'Connor, the artist sister of Ruth Fisher. For her portrayal, she won two Primetime Emmy Awards for Outstanding Guest Actress in a Drama Series, in 2002 and 2005, respectively.

Clarkson appeared in multiple independent films in 2003, including The Baroness and the Pig; Lars von Trier's experimental drama Dogville, the critically acclaimed indie film The Station Agent, playing an artist who befriends a diminutive man (Peter Dinklage) who suddenly appears as a town resident living in a local train depot; Pieces of April, in which she portrayed a mother dying of cancer who travels to visit her estranged daughter (Katie Holmes) for Thanksgiving; and the David Gordon Green-directed drama All the Real Girls, as the mother of a young womanizer in a small southern town. Four of the films—The Baroness and the Pig, Pieces of April, The Station Agent, and All the Real Girls—premiered at the 2003 Sundance Film Festival. Clarkson received numerous accolades for her performances: For The Station Agent, she won the Special Jury Prize at Sundance, and was nominated for a Screen Actors Guild award for Outstanding Performance by a Female Actor in a Leading Role, among others. Her performance in Pieces of April earned her a Sundance Special Jury Prize, as well as nominations for the Screen Actors Guild award for Outstanding Performance by a Female Actor in a Supporting Role, the Golden Globe Award for Best Supporting Actress, and the Academy Award for Best Supporting Actress.

Following these critical successes, Clarkson had a lead role opposite Kurt Russell in the sports docudrama Miracle (2004), about the U.S. hockey team defeating the heavily favored Soviets in the 1980 Olympics, and played the wife of a news correspondent (Robert Downey Jr.) in George Clooney's historical drama Good Night, and Good Luck (2005), about the conflict between journalist Edward R. Murrow and Joseph McCarthy. She then starred as the wife of a Hollywood studio executive in the independent drama The Dying Gaul (2005). 2006 saw the release of The Woods, a supernatural horror film shot in 2003 in which she portrayed the headmistress of a girls' boarding school. The same year, she portrayed Sadie Burke in All the King's Men, set in her native New Orleans.

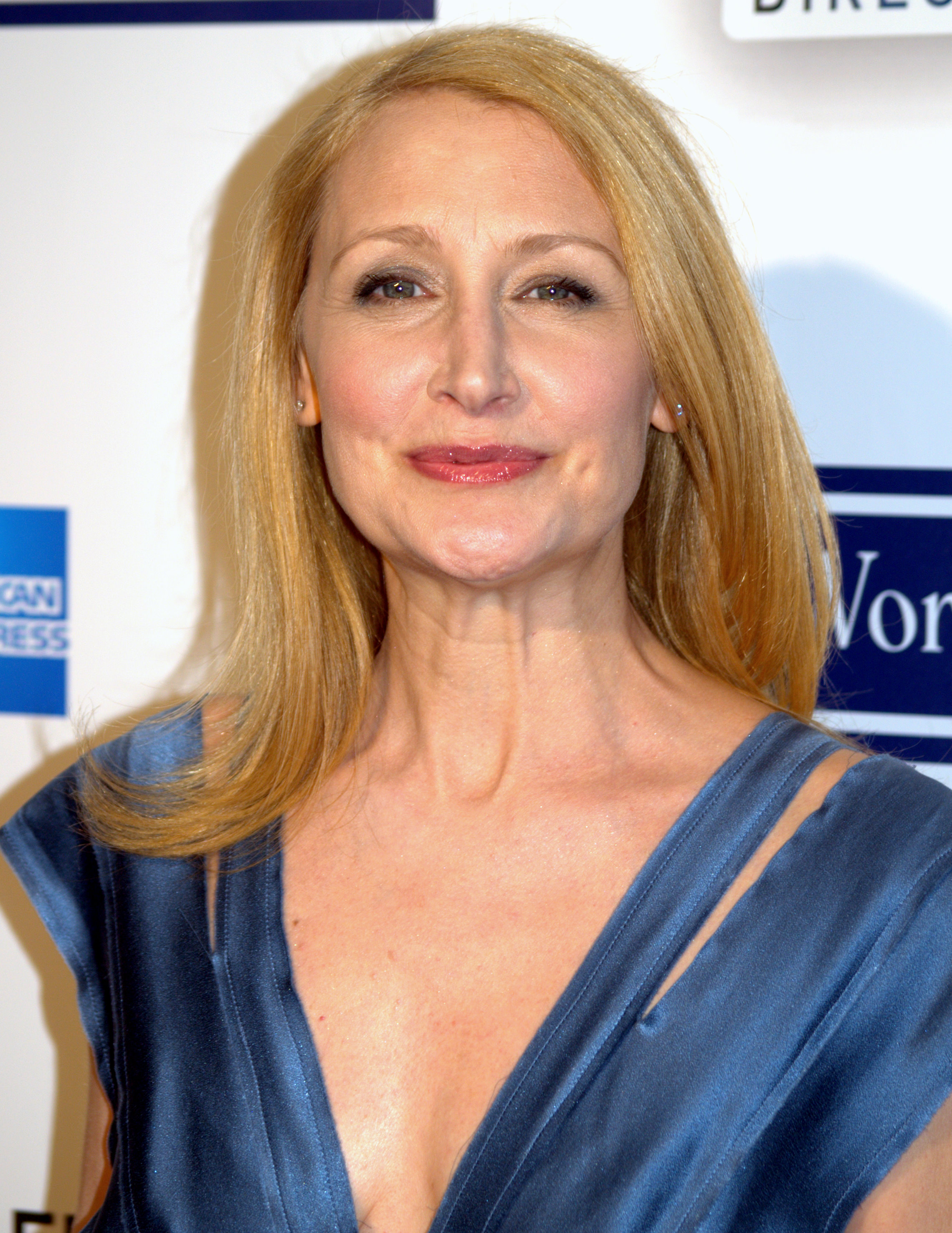
Clarkson at the 2009 Tribeca Film Festival premiere of Whatever Works

In 2007, she had a supporting role in the romantic comedy No Reservations, as well as in the comedy-drama Lars and the Real Girl, in which she portrayed a psychiatrist treating a man in love with a sex doll. She subsequently co-starred with Ben Kingsley in the drama Elegy (2008), and had supporting roles in two Woody Allen films: 2008's Vicky Cristina Barcelona, portraying an unhappy housewife, and 2009's Whatever Works. In 2008, producer Gerald Peary approached Clarkson to do the voice-over for the documentary film For the Love of Movies: The Story of American Film Criticism. Says Peary, "She agreed to do the narration... And she was so nice, and so cooperative, and so prepared, and so intelligent. And one of the key reasons she wanted to do the movie was that she regularly reads criticism, and has a genuine respect for film criticism. Clarkson returned to New Orleans on January 17, 2009 for the reopening of the Mahalia Jackson Theatre for the Performing Arts. She served as master of ceremonies for a gala featuring Plácido Domingo in concert with the New Orleans Opera, conducted by Robert Lyall. She also made a cameo appearance in the Saturday Night Live Digital Short "Motherlover" on May 9, 2009. The video featured Andy Samberg, Justin Timberlake, and Susan Sarandon. She reprised the role on May 21, 2011, in the digital short "3-Way (The Golden Rule)".

=== Mainstream success ===
In 2010, Clarkson appeared opposite Leonardo DiCaprio in the Martin Scorsese-directed thriller Shutter Island, playing a woman escaped from a psychiatric institution. Recounting being cast in the part, Clarkson said: "I got the call that every actor lives for. 'Patty, Martin Scorsese is thinking of casting you in his new movie.' And I do what I call the little 'Martin Scorsese dance' around my apartment. I think I was in my underwear or pajamas. It's a call you live for. Then I hear back, 'But it's just one scene.' So then I'm dancing a little lower. Then I hear, 'It's you and Leonardo DiCaprio in a cave,' and then I'm dancing again." The film was a box office hit, and Scorsese's highest-grossing film at the time.

Clarkson subsequently had roles in two independent films: Legendary and Main Street (both 2010), before appearing in two mainstream comedies directed by Will Gluck: Easy A (2010), as the mother of a troubled high school student (Emma Stone), and as the mother of an executive recruiter (Mila Kunis) in Friends with Benefits (2011). She also appeared in the romantic drama One Day (2011) as the mother of a college student in Scotland (portrayed by Jim Sturgess), and guest-starred on two episodes of the comedy series Parks and Recreation. In 2013, she had a supporting role in the thriller The East (2013) as the leader of a private intelligence firm.

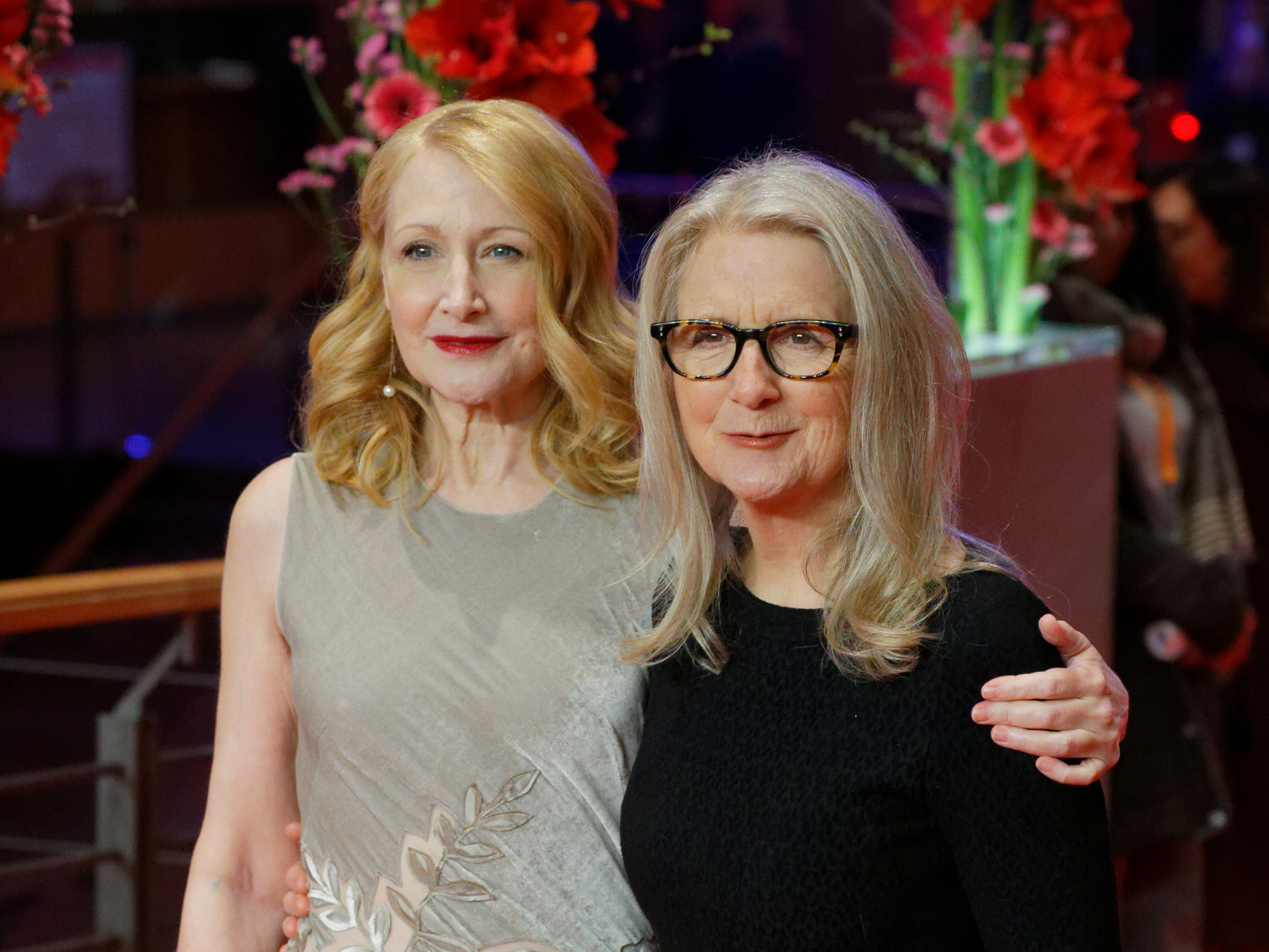
Clarkson with Sally Potter at the 2017 Berlin International Film Festival premiere of The Party

In 2014, Clarkson returned to Broadway portraying Madge Kendal opposite Bradley Cooper in a production of The Elephant Man, which earned her a Tony Award nomination for Best Featured Actress in a Play. The same year, she starred opposite Ben Kingsley in the comedy-drama film Learning to Drive, portraying Wendy, a depressed middle-aged New York book critic learning to drive from a Sikh man. John Patterson of The Guardian praised her performance, writing: "Clarkson gives us every ounce of Wendy's desperation and self-loathing, and every shade of them as well. She has always been a miraculous performer." The same year, she appeared as villain Ava Paige in the major box-office hit The Maze Runner, a dystopian film based on the 2009 young adult novel. She subsequently reprised the role in both sequels: Maze Runner: The Scorch Trials (2015), and Maze Runner: The Death Cure (2018).

Clarkson starred in the ensemble drama The Party in 2017, directed by Sally Potter, for which she won a British Independent Film Award for Best Supporting Actress. The same year, she co-starred with Emily Mortimer and Bill Nighy in The Bookshop, a period drama set in 1959 Suffolk involving two women vying to acquire a building for their own respective businesses. She also guest-starred on the fifth and sixth seasons (2017–2018) of the Netflix political drama series House of Cards, portraying Jane Davis, a United States Department of Commerce official.

She subsequently starred in the science fiction film Jonathan, involving two brothers who alternately share a single body, and the psychological horror film Delirium, which was released directly-to-DVD. Clarkson starred opposite Amy Adams in the psychological drama miniseries Sharp Objects (2018), portraying the wealthy mother of an alcoholic reporter (Adams) investigating a murder in their Missouri town. For her performance in the series, Clarkson won a Golden Globe Award for Best Supporting Actress in a Series, Miniseries or Television Film.

In 2023, Clarkson assumed the lead role in the espionage thriller series Gray, co-produced by AGC Television and Lionsgate Films. The series chronicles CIA operative Cornelia Gray's return to her former life after two decades in hiding, amidst revelations of a mole within the spy network she once belonged to.

== Personal life ==
In response to the Deepwater Horizon oil spill, Clarkson published a post for Natural Resources Defense Council's magazine OnEarth. She also released a public service announcement talking about her experiences growing up in New Orleans. Both pieces were released on July 26, 2010.

Clarkson resides in New York City. In 2007, she purchased a loft in Greenwich Village for US$1.5 million (equivalent to $2.3 million in 2025). She listed it for $2.5 million (equivalent to $3.2 million in 2025) in November 2018. She has never married and has no children, stating in a 2013 interview, "I've never wanted to marry, I've never wanted children—I was born without that gene." Three of Clarkson's four sisters have children and she is very close to her nieces and nephews. One of her nephews, Mac Alsfeld, is an actor, writer and director.

== Acting credits ==
She made her film debut in The Untouchables (1987), followed by a supporting role in The Dead Pool (1988). She appeared in numerous supporting roles in such films as The Green Mile (1999), The Pledge (2001), Far from Heaven (2002), Dogville (2003), The Station Agent (2003), Pieces of April (2003), Good Night, and Good Luck (2005), Lars and the Real Girl (2007), and Elegy (2008). She also appeared in Woody Allen films Vicky Cristina Barcelona (2008) and Whatever Works (2009). In 2010, Clarkson had a supporting role in the thriller Shutter Island, followed by roles in the comedies Easy A and Friends with Benefits. She portrayed Ava Paige in The Maze Runner (2014) and its two sequels. In 2017, she co-starred in Sally Potter's drama The Party and guest-starred on the Netflix series House of Cards. She co-starred with Amy Adams on the HBO miniseries Sharp Objects in 2018. She played Lilly Ledbetter in the 2024 film Lilly.

== Awards and nominations ==
Clarkson was honored by the Jameson Dublin International Film Festival when she received one of the 2010 Volta awards for achievements in her career.

== Sources ==
- Avery, Laura (2005). Newsmakers: Cumulation. New York: Gale Cengage Learning. ISBN 978-0-787-68081-7.
- Clarkson, Patricia (December 7, 2018). "Conversations with Patricia Clarkson" (Interview). Interviewed by Dave Karger. SAG-AFTRA. Archived from the original on December 12, 2021.
