= The Station Agent =

2003 film by Tom McCarthy

- Theatrical release poster
- Directed by: Tom McCarthy
- Written by: Tom McCarthy
- Produced by: Mary Jane Skalski; Robert May; Kathryn Tucker
- Starring: Peter Dinklage; Patricia Clarkson; Bobby Cannavale; Raven Goodwin; Paul Benjamin; Michelle Williams
- Cinematography: Oliver Bokelberg
- Edited by: Tom McArdle
- Music by: Stephen Trask
- Production companies: SenArt Films; Next Wednesday
- Distributed by: Miramax Films
- Release dates: January 2003 (Sundance); October 3, 2003
- Running time: 90 minutes
- Country: United States
- Language: English
- Budget: $500,000
- Box office: $8.7 million

The Station Agent is a 2003 American comedy-drama film written and directed by Tom McCarthy in his directorial debut. It stars Peter Dinklage as a man who seeks solitude in an abandoned train station in the Newfoundland section of Jefferson Township, New Jersey. It also stars Patricia Clarkson, Bobby Cannavale, Raven Goodwin, Paul Benjamin, Michelle Williams and John Slattery.

For his writing achievement, McCarthy won the BAFTA Award for Best Original Screenplay, the Independent Spirit Award for Best First Screenplay and the Waldo Salt Screenwriting Award. The film itself also won the John Cassavetes Award.

== Plot ==
Finbar McBride is a quiet, unmarried man with dwarfism whose deep love of railroads is matched by his preference for solitude. He works at a Hoboken, New Jersey model train hobby shop owned by Henry, an elderly friend who shares his taciturn nature. Fin keeps to himself and feels uncomfortable when others draw attention to his stature.

When Henry dies, Fin learns that the hobby shop is to close and that Henry has left him a rural property containing an abandoned train depot. Hoping to find a secluded place to live, Fin moves into the old building but gradually becomes involved in the lives of his neighbors. Joe Oramas, a Cuban American, runs his father's roadside snack truck while his father recovers from an illness. Olivia Harris, an artist, is struggling with the aftermath of her young son's sudden death two years earlier and the resulting strain on her marriage to David, from whom she is now separated. Both of Olivia's first encounters with Fin involve her dangerously distracted driving. Cleo, a young girl who shares Fin's fascination with trains, hopes to persuade him to speak to her school class about them. Emily, the local librarian, is dismayed to discover that she is pregnant by her ne'er-do-well boyfriend.

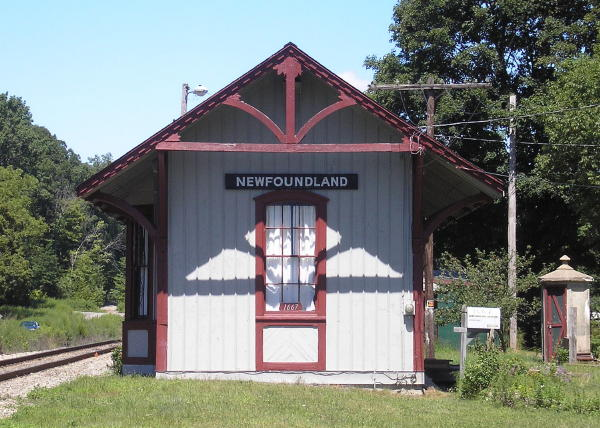
The NYS&W train station used in the movie.

Joe's relentlessly cheerful and talkative personality gradually breaks through Fin's reserve. The two begin taking daily walks along the railroad tracks. After Olivia gives Fin a movie camera, Joe drives alongside a passing train so that Fin can film it. Later, Joe and Fin spend the night at Olivia's house after watching the footage. The following morning, they encounter David, who arrives unexpectedly and is visibly flustered by their presence.

The tentative friendship among the three is threatened when Olivia sinks into a deep depression and disappears. While waiting for Joe at a bar, Fin finds himself offering comfort to Emily and begins to realize that human contact may not be entirely unpleasant. However, when Joe fails to arrive and Fin attempts to protect Emily from her boyfriend, the man pushes Fin aside. The incident causes Fin to retreat into his asocial habits. The following day, Joe visits to apologize, but an angry and frustrated Fin tells him that he wants to be left alone. Hurt by the rejection, Joe drives away in his truck, leaving the depot.

Soon afterward, Emily comes to apologize for the trouble at the bar. She and Fin share a kiss, and she asks if she can spend the night at his place, clarifying that she just wants to sleep. Fin agrees. Meanwhile, Cleo asks him whether Olivia is coming back, but he can only admit that he does not know. Concerned about Olivia, Fin keeps watch on her house and eventually sees her arguing with David over the phone. When he approaches her porch, Olivia angrily orders him to leave.

That night, Fin drinks heavily and collapses on the railroad tracks. A passing train runs over him without injuring him, although his pocket watch is damaged. He subsequently goes to Olivia's house, where he discovers that she has attempted suicide. Olivia tells him that David is expecting another child with a different woman. While Olivia recovers in the hospital, Fin tidies her home and reconciles with Joe. He also finds the courage to speak to the schoolchildren about trains.

In the final scene, Olivia, Joe, and Fin share a meal at Olivia's house. Their conversation consists of casual small talk and tentative reconciliation. Olivia and Joe good-naturedly tease Fin about Emily and encourage him to see her again.

== Cast ==
- Peter Dinklage as Finbar McBride
- Patricia Clarkson as Olivia Harris
- Bobby Cannavale as Joe Oramas
- Michelle Williams as Emily
- Raven Goodwin as Cleo
- Paul Benjamin as Henry Styles
- Jayce Bartok as Chris
- Joe Lo Truglio as Danny
- John Slattery as David
- Lynn Cohen as Patty
- Richard Kind as Louis Tiboni
- Josh Pais as Carl

== Production ==
The Station Agent was shot on 16 mm film in 20 days with a budget of half a million dollars.

According to writer-director Tom McCarthy's commentary on the DVD release, the film was shot on a shoestring budget in a limited amount of time. Locations used included Lake Hopatcong, Dover, Hibernia, Rockaway Township, Rockaway Borough, Hoboken, Newfoundland and Oak Ridge, New Jersey, as well as Bucks County, Pennsylvania. The Newfoundland station, originally built by the New Jersey Midland Railway in 1872, is located in Newfoundland, New Jersey, on the active New York, Susquehanna and Western Railway.

== Reception ==
The film premiered at the Sundance Film Festival and was shown at the Toronto International Film Festival and the San Sebastián Film Festival before going into limited release in the US on October 3, 2003. Playing in three theaters, it grossed weekend, with an average of $19,261 per theater and ranking 55th at the box office. Its widest release was in 198 theaters where it earned $5,739,376 domestically and $2,940,438 internationally, for a total of $8,679,814, well above its estimated $500,000 production budget.

The film received a very positive response from critics. It has a rating of 94% on Rotten Tomatoes based on 160 reviews with an average rating of 8.00/10. The website's critical consensus states, "A sweet and quirky film about a dwarf, a refreshment stand operator, and a reclusive artist connecting with one another." It also has a score of 81 out of 100 on Metacritic based on 36 reviews.

Elvis Mitchell of The New York Times observed, "Tom McCarthy has such an appreciation for quiet that it occupies the same space as a character in this film, a delicate, thoughtful and often hilarious take on loneliness . . . It's the kind of appetizing movie you want to share with others."

Roger Ebert of the Chicago Sun-Times said, "[T]his is a comedy, but it's also sad, and finally, it's simply a story about trying to figure out what you love to do and then trying to figure out how to do it . . . It is a great relief . . . that The Station Agent is not one of those movies in which the problem is that the characters have not slept with each other and the solution is that they do. It's more about the enormous unrealized fears and angers that throb beneath the surfaces of their lives."

Ruthe Stein of the San Francisco Chronicle called it "as touching and original a movie as you're likely to see this year" and "a remarkably assured first film."

Peter Travers of Rolling Stone said, "Tom McCarthy has a gift for funny and touching nuances . . . The three actors could not be better. Huge feelings are packed into this small, fragile movie. It's something special."

James Christopher of The Times stated, "The brilliance of Peter Dinklage's performance as the ironclad loner is that he doesn’t much care. Yet there’s something deeply affecting about his stoicism and suspicion that has nothing to do with artificial sweeteners, Disney sentiment, or party political broadcasts on behalf of dwarfs. Dinklage just gets on with his performance like an actor who can't understand why he's got the lead role. It's this tension between the film and the unwilling Romeo that makes The Station Agent such a hypnotic watch."

=== Accolades ===
Award	Recipient	Result
BAFTA Award for Best Original Screenplay	Tom McCarthy	Won
Boston Society of Film Critics Award for Best Supporting Actress	Patricia Clarkson	Won
Chicago Film Critics Association Award for Most Promising Performer	Peter Dinklage	Nominated
Florida Film Critics Circle Award for Best Supporting Actress	Patricia Clarkson	Won
Independent Spirit Award for Best First Screenplay		Won
Independent Spirit John Cassavetes Award		Won
Independent Spirit Award for Best Lead Male	Peter Dinklage	Nominated
Kansas City Film Critics Circle Award for Best Supporting Actress	Patricia Clarkson	Won
Las Vegas Film Critics Society Award for Best Screenplay		Won
National Board of Review Award for Best Supporting Actress	Patricia Clarkson	Won
National Society of Film Critics Award for Best Supporting Actress	Patricia Clarkson	Won
Satellite Award for Best Original Screenplay		Nominated
Screen Actors Guild Award for Outstanding Performance by a Cast in a Motion Picture		Nominated
Screen Actors Guild Award for Outstanding Performance by a Male Actor in a Leading Role	Peter Dinklage	Nominated
Screen Actors Guild Award for Outstanding Performance by a Female Actor in a Leading Role	Patricia Clarkson	Nominated
Sundance Film Festival Audience Award (Dramatic)		Won
Sundance Film Festival Special Jury Prize	Patricia Clarkson	Won
Sundance Film Festival Waldo Salt Screenwriting Award		Won
Writers Guild of America Award for Best Original Screenplay		Nominated
