= Temple Grandin (film) =

2010 American film directed by Mick Jackson

- Film poster
- Genre: Biographical drama
- Based on: Emergence by; Temple Grandin; Margaret Scariano; Thinking in Pictures by Temple Grandin
- Screenplay by: Christopher Monger; William Merritt Johnson
- Directed by: Mick Jackson
- Starring: Claire Danes; Catherine O'Hara; Julia Ormond; David Strathairn
- Music by: Alex Wurman
- Country of origin: United States
- Original language: English

Production
- Executive producers: Emily Gerson Saines; Gil Bellows; Alison Owen; Paul Lister; Anthony Edwards; Dante Di Loreto
- Producer: Scott Ferguson
- Cinematography: Ivan Strasburg
- Editor: Leo Trombetta
- Running time: 107 minutes
- Production companies: HBO Films; Ruby Films; Gerson Saines Productions

Original release
- Network: HBO
- Release: February 6, 2010

Temple Grandin is a 2010 American biographical drama television film directed by Mick Jackson and starring Claire Danes as Temple Grandin, an autistic woman whose innovations revolutionized practices for the humane handling of livestock on cattle ranches and slaughterhouses. It is based on Grandin's memoirs Emergence and Thinking in Pictures.

The biopic was inspired by executive producer Emily Gerson Saines, whose experience as the mother of an autistic child motivated her to share Temple Grandin's story. She secured Grandin's approval in the late 1990s but faced years of setbacks before the project came to fruition. After several creative shifts, the film was directed by Mick Jackson, with Claire Danes cast as Grandin. Danes immersed herself in the role, studying Grandin's work and spending time with her to capture her unique persona. Filmed in Texas in 2008, the production emphasized authenticity, even involving Grandin in key moments.

Premiering on HBO on February 6, 2010, the film earned widespread acclaim for its heartfelt and authentic portrayal. Critics praised its ability to make Grandin's autism relatable and her perspective on livestock psychology deeply compelling. Claire Danes' performance received particular acclaim for its depth and precision, avoiding sentimentality while portraying Grandin's growth with nuance. The film's avoidance of clichés and its thoughtful direction, evocative score, and visuals were widely lauded. Temple Grandin was celebrated as an inspiring, meticulously crafted biopic that offered a rare and moving glimpse into an extraordinary life and mind. It won several awards including five Primetime Emmy Awards, and Golden Globe and Screen Actors Guild prizes for Danes.

== Plot ==
Temple Grandin is an uncommunicative child who is prone to meltdowns and is diagnosed with autism. The medical consensus at the time is that autism is a form of schizophrenia resulting from insufficient maternal affection. Despite recommendations to place her in an institution, Temple's mother hires therapists and works to help her daughter adapt to social interaction.

In 1962, at the age of 15, Temple travels to her aunt and uncle's ranch to work. She observes cows being placed into a squeeze chute to calm them, and, during an anxiety attack, she uses the chute to calm herself. Inspired by her teacher, Dr. Carlock, to pursue science, she is admitted to Franklin Pierce College where she develops an early version of the squeeze machine to calm herself during stressful times. Her college misinterprets the use of the machine as an unlawful sexual act and informs the police, who seize and destroy it. In response, she develops a scientific protocol to test subjects' reactions to the machine, proving it to be a purely therapeutic device. Temple graduates with a degree in psychology and pursues a master's degree in animal science.

Temple faces sexism while attempting to integrate into the world of cattle ranching but ultimately designs a new dip structure designed to allow cattle to voluntarily move through rather than being forced. Initially, the device works as intended, and garners favorable coverage in local press, but the ranch hands are dismissive of her design and alter it, resulting in the drowning of several cows. Angered, Temple visits Dr. Carlock, and leaves the meeting encouraged to continue her efforts to improve the industry and start her own slaughterhouse.

Several days after visiting Dr. Carlock, Temple gets a call from her mother revealing that he has died. Later, while shopping, Temple meets a woman named Betty whose husband works for a slaughterhouse. Temple meets with Betty's husband at the slaughterhouse and explains her plan for the layout of the slaughterhouse. Her idea is tested, and works.

Years later, in 1981, Temple arrives at the National Autism Convention and shares her story.

== Cast ==
- Claire Danes as Temple Grandin
- Catherine O'Hara as Aunt Ann, Temple's aunt by marriage. As a teenager, Temple often visited her Arizona cattle ranch during the summer.
- Julia Ormond as Eustacia Cutler, Temple's mother. When Temple was younger, Eustacia was in denial over the doctor's diagnosis of Temple's autism. Eustacia was determined to have her daughter receive an education and lead a normal life.
- David Strathairn as Dr. Carlock, Temple's boarding school science teacher and mentor. Carlock was aware of Temple's visual skills and was supportive in furthering her education.
- Charles Baker as Billy, a worker at Aunt Ann's farm.
- Barry Tubb as Randy

== Production ==
=== Development ===
The idea for a biopic of Grandin originated with its executive producer Emily Gerson Saines, a successful talent agent and a co-founder of the nonprofit Autism Coalition for Research and Education (now part of Autism Speaks). In the mid-1990s, Gerson Saines was a vice-president at the William Morris Agency when her 2-year-old son was diagnosed with autism. She learned about Grandin soon afterward, when her mother told her about seeing Grandin's book Thinking in Pictures in a bookstore and, around the same time, her grandmother independently sent her an article about Grandin by Oliver Sacks.

Reading about Grandin renewed Gerson Saines' "energy, motivation and spirit" in coping with her son's condition. "Temple's story brought me hope and (her mother)'s story gave me direction and purpose", Gerson Saines said in a later interview. "Parents of a child with autism everywhere need to hear it, functionally and spiritually. I knew this story had to be told and given my access as a talent representative in the entertainment industry, I felt it was my responsibility to make that happen." Through Grandin's agent, Gerson Saines asked to meet Grandin for lunch. "She came in wearing her cowgirl shirt—in her very Temple way, in her very Temple walk. I realized that there were people staring at her, and in a different lifetime I might have been one of them, but all I could think of was, 'I can't believe how lucky I am to be here. This woman's my hero.'"

Grandin was familiar with Gerson Saines' work with the Autism Coalition and granted her permission to make the film, but the endeavor—first launched in the late 1990s—would take more than ten years to come to fruition. Variety reported in 2002 that David O. Russell was attached to direct the film from a screenplay by W. Merritt Johnson (adapting from Grandin's memoirs Emergence and Thinking in Pictures). Russell later dropped out and was replaced by Moisés Kaufman, who also left the project. By 2008, Mick Jackson had signed on to direct, and Claire Danes was in negotiations to star as Grandin. Johnson's script had been replaced by one from Christopher Monger (both Johnson and Monger are credited as writers of the finished film).

One element Gerson Saines was sure about from the beginning was that she wanted to work with HBO, in part because of her longstanding relationship with the network through her work as an agent. "But I also knew that by going that route, more people will see it", she said. "When you're trying to make a movie like this, it's very rare that it reaches a wide audience." HBO was equally intrigued by the story, and Gerson Saines credits past and present HBO executives with keeping the project alive until it could be properly realized. "I made a commitment to Temple that I was going to make it and make it right...I never pushed to get it made until now, because now we got it right."

Jackson knew early on that Danes was his first choice to portray Grandin, believing that Danes' seriousness and dedication would help her to capture Grandin's mercurial mental and emotional shifts without veering the film into disease-of-the-week melodrama. Danes herself was coming off a string of more lightweight roles (whose "primary job and experience [was] to become gaga over a man", she described) and eager to take on a more demanding part. Although she was only vaguely aware of Grandin at the time, Danes dove into research, including watching documentaries about Grandin and studying Grandin's books and recordings. "It was really daunting, because she's alive and has a great eye for detail", Danes said. The two women spent about six hours together in Danes' apartment, ending with a hug from Grandin ("For her, that's not easy", Danes observed), which Danes was glad to take as validation that Grandin approved of her for the role.

=== Filming ===
Temple Grandin began shooting on 22 October 2008 at Austin Studios in Austin, Texas. The film was noted for filming in Texas at a time when TV and film production had grown scarce in the state, and legislators were seeking to expand financial incentives to draw more film crews. Grandin producer Scott Ferguson said that Arizona, New Mexico and Canada had all been considered before producers had chosen Texas, in part because different areas of the state could be used to represent the rural West and New England. Ferguson also credited the abundance of trained film crews in the Austin and Dallas regions as a significant benefit to shooting in the area. Cinematographer Ivan Strasburg shot the film on Kodak Super 16 mm film stocks with Arriflex 416 cameras, which were usually operated hand-held to "create a 'slight' feeling of visual tension".

Gerson Saines brought Grandin to observe the last day of shooting, which was a scene involving a cattle dip tank that Grandin had designed. Although Grandin said that she tried to stay away from Danes to avoid impinging on her performance, she was quite concerned about the proper construction of the tank and about the breed of cattle being used in the scene. "I thought, we can't have a silly thing like that City Slickers movie, where they had Holstein cattle out there", Grandin said. "If you know anything about cattle, you'd know that was stupid." She said watching Danes on the monitors was "like going back in a weird time machine to the '60s".

== Release ==
The film was previewed on January 27 at the Gene Siskel Film Center, in a screening attended by Grandin. A trailer was previewed for critics during their winter press tour on January 14; critics responded positively to "the film's bright palette and inventive direction". HBO and bookstore chain Barnes & Noble partnered to promote both the film and Grandin's books, displaying information about autism and the film in all Barnes & Noble stores and creating a free downloadable coloring book about Grandin, using illustrations by autistic artists. Grandin appeared for a special book signing, discussion and preview of the film at a Manhattan Barnes & Noble on January 25. The film debuted on February 6, 2010.

== Reception ==
=== Critical response ===
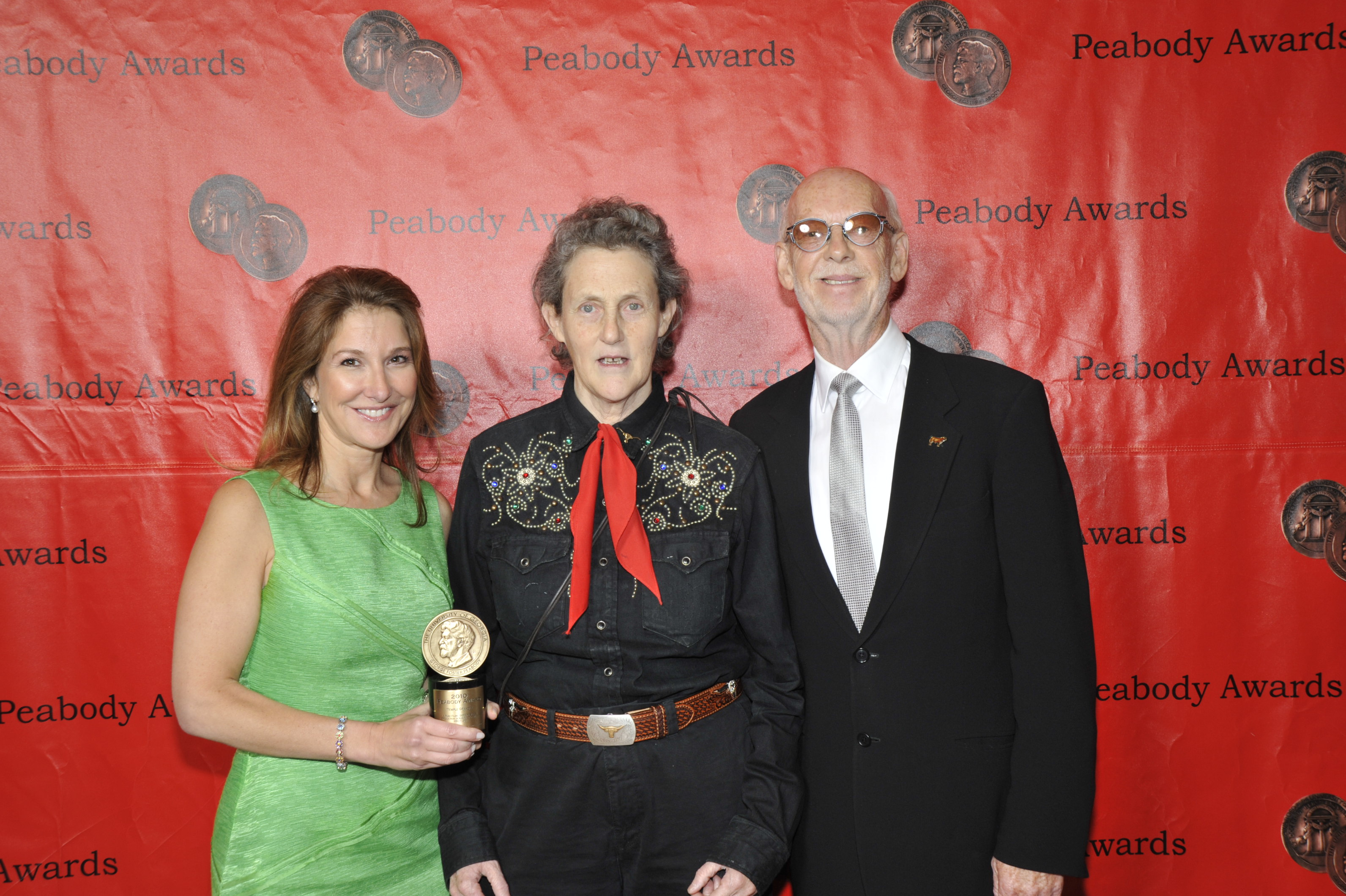
Emily Gerson Saines, Temple Grandin and Mick Jackson at the 70th Annual Peabody Awards

Temple Grandin received a Metacritic score of 84/100 based on reviews from 19 critics. Review aggregator Rotten Tomatoes gives the film an approval rating of 100% based on 31 reviews, with an average rating of 8.7/10. The website's critics consensus reads, "A heartfelt glimpse into Temple Grandin's mind, this engrossing biopic reaches its full potential thanks to Claire Danes' unsentimental performance."

Entertainment Weekly's Jennifer Armstrong wrote: "The beauty of [the film] is that it makes the title character's autism—and the unique insight it gave her into livestock psychology—relatable to anyone with a heart, and fascinating to anyone with a brain. The fact that it does so with such a singular story only makes the movie that much greater."

Alessandra Stanley of The New York Times called it "A made for-television biopic that avoids the mawkish clichés of the genre without draining the narrative of color and feeling. Ms. Danes is completely at ease in her subject's lumbering gait and unmodulated voice. She makes Temple's anxiety as immediate and contagious as her rarer bursts of merriment... And as the character ages and learns more social graces, Ms. Danes seamlessly captures Temple's progress."

Robert Bianco of USA Today wrote that unlike many other HBO productions, "Temple is an incredibly joyous and often humorous film." While praising the direction and the strong supporting cast of Catherine O'Hara, David Strathairn, and Julia Ormond, Bianco declared that "as good as everything is around them, Temple Grandin belongs to two women: the real Temple, who appears to be a spectacular human being, and Danes, who is clearly a spectacular actor."

The A.V. Club's Noel Murray, himself the father of an autistic son, wrote: "Some of the movie's aesthetic choices border on the cliché. The pulsing minimalism of Alex Wurman's score has become as much a shorthand for 'intellectual mystery' as Arabic wailing has for 'Danger! Terrorists!,' and Temple Grandin's illustrative animated sequences run a little too close to A Beautiful Mind for my taste." Murray gives the film a grade A−, in part for Danes' success in portraying Grandin as a full-fledged personality instead of "a checklist of symptoms gleaned from a medical journal".

NPR's David Bianculli unambiguously named the film "The best tele-movie of the past several years... I can't praise this movie highly enough. It's not maudlin or sentimental, but it is excitingly inspirational. It scores big emotional points with very small touches, the sound of a heartbeat, a tentative touch, a victorious smile. The acting, writing, directing, production values, every sight and every sound in HBO's Temple Grandin is perfect."

=== Accolades ===
Year	Award	Category	Nominee(s)	Result	Ref.
2010	Artios Awards	Outstanding Achievement in Casting – Television Movie/Mini Series	David Rubin and Richard Hicks	Nominated	
2010	Golden Nymph Awards	Best Television Film		Nominated	
2010	Golden Nymph Awards	Best Direction	Mick Jackson	Nominated	
2010	Golden Nymph Awards	Outstanding Actress	Claire Danes	Nominated	
2010	Golden Nymph Awards	AMADE-UNESCO Prize		Won	
2010	Hollywood Post Alliance Awards	Outstanding Color Grading – Television	Kevin O'Connor	Nominated	
2010	Humanitas Prize	90 Minute or Longer Network or Syndicated Television	Christopher Monger and William Merritt Johnson	Won	
2010	Online Film & Television Association Awards	Best Motion Picture or Miniseries		Nominated	
2010	Online Film & Television Association Awards	Best Actress in a Motion Picture or Miniseries	Claire Danes	Won	
2010	Online Film & Television Association Awards	Best Supporting Actress in a Motion Picture or Miniseries	Julia Ormond	Nominated	
2010	Online Film & Television Association Awards	Best Direction of a Motion Picture or Miniseries	Mick Jackson	Nominated	
2010	Online Film & Television Association Awards	Best Writing of a Motion Picture or Miniseries	Christopher Monger and William Merritt Johnson	Nominated	
2010	Online Film & Television Association Awards	Best Costume Design in a Non-Series		Won	
2010	Online Film & Television Association Awards	Best Editing in a Non-Series		Nominated	
2010	Online Film & Television Association Awards	Best Makeup/Hairstyling in a Non-Series		Won	
2010	Online Film & Television Association Awards	Best Music in a Non-Series		Nominated	
2010	Online Film & Television Association Awards	Best Sound in a Non-Series		Nominated	
2010	Online Film & Television Association Awards	Best Visual Effects in a Non-Series		Nominated	
2010	Peabody Awards		A Ruby Films, Gerson Saines Production in association with HBO Films	Won	
2010	Primetime Emmy Awards	Outstanding Made for Television Movie	Emily Gerson Saines, Gil Bellows, Anthony Edwards, Dante Di Loreto, Paul Lister, Alison Owen, and Scott Ferguson	Won	
2010	Primetime Emmy Awards	Outstanding Lead Actress in a Miniseries or a Movie	Claire Danes	Won	
2010	Primetime Emmy Awards	Outstanding Supporting Actor in a Miniseries or a Movie	David Strathairn	Won	
2010	Primetime Emmy Awards	Outstanding Supporting Actress in a Miniseries or a Movie	Catherine O'Hara	Nominated	
2010	Primetime Emmy Awards	Outstanding Supporting Actress in a Miniseries or a Movie	Julia Ormond	Won	
2010	Primetime Emmy Awards	Outstanding Directing for a Miniseries, Movie or a Dramatic Special	Mick Jackson	Won	
2010	Primetime Emmy Awards	Outstanding Writing for a Miniseries, Movie or a Dramatic Special	Christopher Monger and William Merritt Johnson	Nominated	
2010	Primetime Creative Arts Emmy Awards	Outstanding Art Direction for a Miniseries or Movie	Richard Hoover, Meghan C. Rogers, and Gabriella Villarreal	Nominated	
2010	Primetime Creative Arts Emmy Awards	Outstanding Casting for a Miniseries, Movie or a Special	David Rubin, Richard Hicks, and Beth Sepko	Nominated	
2010	Primetime Creative Arts Emmy Awards	Outstanding Hairstyling for a Miniseries or a Movie	Geordie Sheffer and Charles Yusko	Nominated	
2010	Primetime Creative Arts Emmy Awards	Outstanding Main Title Design	Michael Riley, Zee Nederlander, Dru Nget, and Bob Swensen	Nominated	
2010	Primetime Creative Arts Emmy Awards	Outstanding Makeup for a Miniseries or a Movie (Non-Prosthetic)	Tarra D. Day and Meredith Johns	Nominated	
2010	Primetime Creative Arts Emmy Awards	Outstanding Music Composition for a Miniseries, Movie or a Special (Original Dramatic Score)	Alex Wurman	Won	
2010	Primetime Creative Arts Emmy Awards	Outstanding Single-Camera Picture Editing for a Miniseries or a Movie	Leo Trombetta	Won	
2010	Primetime Creative Arts Emmy Awards	Outstanding Sound Editing for a Miniseries, Movie or a Special	Bryan Bowen, Vanessa Lapato, Paul Curtis, Petra Bach, Bruce Tanis, Ellen Segal, David Lee Fein, and Hilda Hodges	Nominated	
2010	Satellite Awards	Best Motion Picture Made for Television		Won	
2010	Satellite Awards	Best Actress in a Miniseries or a Motion Picture Made for Television	Claire Danes	Won	
2010	Satellite Awards	Best Actor in a Supporting Role in a Series, Miniseries or Motion Picture Made for Television	David Strathairn	Won	
2010	Satellite Awards	Best Actress in a Supporting Role in a Series, Miniseries or Motion Picture Made for Television	Catherine O'Hara	Nominated	
2010	Television Critics Association Awards	Outstanding Achievement in Movies, Miniseries and Specials		Nominated	
2010	Women Film Critics Circle Awards	Best Theatrically Unreleased Movie by or About Women		Won	
2010	Women's Image Network Awards	Actress in a Mini-Series / Made for Television Movie	Claire Danes	Won	
2011	American Cinema Editors Awards	Best Edited Miniseries or Motion Picture for Television	Leo Trombetta	Won	
2011	American Film Institute Awards	Top 10 Television Programs		Won	
2011	Cinema Audio Society Awards	Outstanding Achievement in Sound Mixing for Television Movies and Mini-Series	Ethan Andrus and Rick Ash	Won	
2011	Costume Designers Guild Awards	Outstanding Made for Television Movie or Miniseries	Cindy Evans	Won	
2011	Critics' Choice Awards	Best Picture Made for Television		Nominated	
2011	Directors Guild of America Awards	Outstanding Directorial Achievement in Movies for Television and Miniseries	Mick Jackson	Won	
2011	Dorian Awards	TV Drama Performance of the Year	Claire Danes	Nominated	
2011	Golden Globe Awards	Best Miniseries or Television Film		Nominated	
2011	Golden Globe Awards	Best Actress in a Miniseries or a Motion Picture Made for Television	Claire Danes	Won	
2011	Golden Globe Awards	Best Supporting Actor in a Series, Miniseries or Motion Picture Made for Television	David Strathairn	Nominated	
2011	Golden Reel Awards	Best Sound Editing – Long Form Dialogue and ADR in Television	Bryan Bowen, Vanessa Lapato, Petra Bach, and Paul Curtis	Nominated	
2011	Golden Reel Awards	Best Sound Editing - Long Form Sound Effects and Foley in Television	Bryan Bowen, Bruce Tanis, David Lee Fein, and Hilda Hodges	Nominated	
2011	Gracie Awards	Outstanding Female Lead – Drama	Claire Danes	Won	
2011	Guild of Music Supervisors Awards	Best Music Supervision for Movie of the Week	Evyen Klean (Note: Also for The Pacific, The Special Relationship and You Don't Know Jack.)	Won	
2011	Producers Guild of America Awards	David L. Wolper Award for Outstanding Producer of Long-Form Television	Gil Bellows, Scott Ferguson, Emily Gerson Saines, Paul Lister, and Alison Owen	Nominated	
2011	Screen Actors Guild Awards	Outstanding Performance by a Female Actor in a Television Movie or Miniseries	Claire Danes	Won	
2011	Screen Actors Guild Awards	Outstanding Performance by a Female Actor in a Television Movie or Miniseries	Catherine O'Hara	Nominated	
2011	Screen Actors Guild Awards	Outstanding Performance by a Female Actor in a Television Movie or Miniseries	Julia Ormond	Nominated	
2011	Western Heritage Awards	Television Feature Film		Won	
2011	Western Writers of America Awards	Best Western Drama	Christopher Monger and William Merritt Johnson	Won (Note: Tied with Joel and Ethan Coen for True Grit.)	
2011	Writers Guild of America Awards	Long Form – Adapted	Christopher Monger and William Merritt Johnson; Based on the books: Emergence by Temple Grandin and Margaret Scariano; Thinking in Pictures by Temple Grandin	Nominated	
