= Stuart Klipper =

American photographer (born 1941)

Stuart David Klipper
- Born: 1941 (age 84–85); Bronx, New York City, US
- Education: University of Michigan
- Occupation: Photographer
- Years active: 1960s-present
- Known for: Panoramic landscapes, photographs of Antarctica
- Website: www.stuartklipper.com

Stuart David Klipper (born 1941 in the Bronx) is an American photographer based in Minneapolis. Best known for his panoramic landscape shots, Klipper has visited Antarctica six times between 1976 and 2009, five of which were as part of the National Science Foundation's (NSF) Antarctic Artists and Writers Program. He is a two-time Guggenheim Fellowship winner (1979, 1989) and a three-time National Endowment for the Arts Visual Artists' fellow (1976, 1979, 1981). He is one of a few hundred people who have stood at both the North and South Poles.

== Early life ==
Klipper was born in the Bronx, New York City in 1941. His father was an accountant whose family emigrated from Lithuania, and his Brooklyn-born mother was Galician. The family was reform but attended a conservative synagogue. Klipper became interested in photography early in life, in part due to his father's dedication to documenting their childhood in photos. He was part of the photography club in school and bought his "first real camera," a Rolleicord, with his Bar Mitzvah money.

Klipper attended the University of Michigan, initially intending to study engineering. He graduated with a degree in psychology in 1962. He took photography classes there after finishing his degree.

== Career ==
Klipper left for Stockholm in 1965 and returned to the US a year later with a "Swedish sweetheart" and settled in Brooklyn Heights. In 1970, he joined the faculty of the Minneapolis College of Art and Design as a photography teacher. He also teaches a photography course at Colorado College. In 1983, he won a contest held by the Minneapolis Arts Commission to design one of eight manhole covers in downtown Minneapolis.

Klipper is well-known for his panoramics of the Antarctic and, as of 2018, has visited six times. He went to the Arctic for the first time in 1976 on a Sierra Club expedition. He has been part of the National Science Foundation's (NSF) Antarctic Artists and Writers Program since 1987. In 1989, he was based at McMurdo Station and, in 1992, he traveled aboard the Nathaniel B. Palmer. His most recent trip with the NSF was in 1999. In July 2009, he visited the North Pole, making him one of approximately 400 people to have stood at both the North and South Poles. He has also worked in Greenland, Iceland, Svalbard, and the area of Lapland irradiated by the Chernobyl disaster.

He has also photographed in a range of warmer climates, including the deserts of Israel and Sinai, Costa Rica, Australia, Patagonia, Tierra del Fuego, Sri Lanka, and Pakistan. In 1982, he was part of a group exhibition called Anasazi Places. The Being of Place: The Presence of Time at Drake University of Anasazi architecture and ruins. In 1985, he had a solo exhibition entitled Graves and Memorials 1914 to 1918 of World War I memorials and gravesites on the Western Front. Using a grant from the Jerome Foundation, he traveled to Rome in 2002 to photograph churches and antiquities. His work has been published in several magazines, including Harper's, Newsweek, and Aperature. In 2008, he published the book The Antarctic: From the Circle to the Pole through Chronicle Books about his time in Antarctica. Over the course of his career, he has hosted talks, lectures, photography competition, exhibitions, and workshops across the United States, and has been volunteering for decades at a local elementary school, teaching photography to kids in first through fifth grades.

Klipper's photographs have been exhibited in and collected by museums in the US and abroad, including the Museum of Modern Art, San Francisco Museum of Modern Art, Art Institute of Chicago, Minneapolis Institute of Arts, Walker Art Center, Jewish Museum, the Moderna Museet, Israel Museum, Victoria and Albert Museum, Fotogalleriet in Oslo, US Embassy in Santiago, Canterbury Museum, and Bonn Kunsthalle in Bonn, Switzerland. He has been commissioned by the states of Texas and Minnesota, Cray Research Corp., First Bank System, Valspar, University of Minnesota, and Medtronics Corp.

== Grants, honors, and fellowships ==
- Minnesota State Arts Board Grant (1974)
- Minnesota State Arts Board Grant (1976)
- National Endowment for the Arts Visual Artists' Fellowship (1976/1977)
- John Simon Guggenheim Memorial Foundation (1979)
- National Endowment for the Arts Visual Artists' Fellowship (1979/1980)
- Bush Foundation Fellowship (1980)
- National Endowment for the Humanities Fellowship (1981)
- McKnight Foundation Photography Fellowship (1985)
- McKnight Foundation Photography Fellowship (1987)
- NSF Antarctic Artists and Writers Program (1989)
- John Simon Guggenheim Memorial Foundation (1989)
- Antarctica Service Medal (1989)
- NSF Antarctic Artists and Writers Program (1992)
- Minnesota State Arts Board Grant (1992)
- NSF Antarctic Artists and Writers Program (1994)
- Bush Foundation Fellowship (1995)
- NSF Antarctic Artists and Writers Program (1999)
- Jerome Foundation (2003)
- Bogliasco Foundation (2003)
- Pollock-Krasner Foundation Grant (2019/2020)
- McKnight Foundation Photography Fellowship (unknown date)

== Selected exhibitions ==
=== Solo ===
- Duluth Photographs from the Minnesota Survey at Tweed Museum of Art, 1979
- Graves and Memorials 1914 to 1918 at Winthrop College, 1985
- Most North at the Art Institute of Chicago, 1985-1986
- Stuart Klipper: On Antarctica at the Joslyn Art Museum, 1992
- Stuart Klipper: Images from a Frozen Continent at the Christchurch Art Gallery, 1994
- H_{2}O at Yancey Richardson Gallery, 1995
- Looking... Seeing... Knowing: The Photographs of Stuart Klipper at the Atlantic Center for the Arts, 1998
- Disparate Geographies at the Schmidt/Dean Gallery (Philadelphia), 1998
- Cardinal Points at the University of Iowa Stanley Museum of Art, 1998
- Arktis - Antarktis at the Kunsthalle des Deutschesrepublic (Bonn), 1998
- At Sea Near the Poles at the Spencer Gallery (Wickford), 1999
- Antarctica at the Yancey Richardson Gallery, 2000
- Wyoming at the University of Wyoming Art Museum, 2001-2002
- In the Australian Outback at Gallery 360 (Minneapolis), 2002
- United States at the Candace Perich Gallery (Katonah), 2002
- Rock art, bush fire, termite mounds and other aspects of the outback of the Top End of Australia at Gallery 360 (Minneapolis), 2002
- Portraits about Pakistan, 1987 at the Icebox Gallery (Minneapolis), 2002
- The Louisiana Purchase at the Olson-Larsen Gallery (Des Moines), 2003
- Antarctica at Electrolift Artworks (Minneapolis), 2006
- Louisiana: Photographs by Stuart Klipper at the Ogden Museum of Southern Art, 2008
- Antarctic Photographs at the Charleston Museum, 2009
- Local Places – Remote Terrains at the Olson-Larsen Gallery (Des Moines), 2009
- The Dead Sea Region, Israel at the Basilica of Saint Mary, 2010
- The World in a Few States at the Muskegon Museum of Art, 2014
- Passages at the Joseph Bellows Gallery (La Jolla), 2018

=== Group ===
- Photographers: Midwest Invitational at University of North Dakota Art Gallery, 1974
- Minnesota Survey: Six Photographers at the Minneapolis Institute of Arts, 1978
- Anasazi Places. The Being of Place: The Presence of Time at the Drake University Art Gallery, 1982
- Stuart Klipper and Rhondal McKinney at San Francisco Museum of Modern Art, 1989
- Plain Pictures: Images of the American Prairie at the University of Iowa Museum of Art, 1996
- Photography of New York City at the Minneapolis Institute of Art, 1998
- Sea Change: The Seascape in Contemporary Photography at the Center for Creative Photography, 1998/99
- American farms and farming at the Candace Perish Gallery (Katonah), 1998-1999
- Views from the Edge of the World at the Marlborough Gallery, 1999
- Claiming Title: Australian Aboriginal Artists and the Land at St. Olaf College and Carleton College, 1999
- The Infinite and the Intimate; Waterscapes of Stuart Klipper and Frank Gohlke at the Dorsky Gallery (NYC), 1999
- An Eclectic Focus: Photographs from the Vernon Collection at the Santa Barbara Museum of Art, 1999
- Aqua at the Gallerie Thierry Marlat (Paris), 1999
- Restructuring the Prairie at Grinnell College, 1999
- The Mural as Muse at the Deutsches Bank Gallery (NYC), 2000
- earth, sky at Jackson Fine Art (Atlanta), 2000
- Western Panoramas at the Huntington Museum (Santa Barbara), 2001
- I Love New York - World Trade Center benefit (NYC), 2001
- Antarctic 1: Views Along Antarctica's First Highway at the Center for Land Use Interpretation (Los Angeles), 2002
- Melodrama at the Artium Museum, 2002
- Antarctic Visions and Voices at Carleton College, 2003
- Contemporary Desert Photography at the Palm Springs Art Museum, 2005-2007
- Downriver: New Orleans before the Flood at the Minnesota Center for Photography (Minneapolis), 2006
- Midwestern View: Contemporary Photography in Minnesota at the Pingyao International Photography Festival, 2007
- Visions of Music at the Acadiana Center for the Arts (Lafayette), 2007
- Antarctic at the University of Wyoming Art Museum, 2007
- Photographs from the Ends of the Earth at the Milwaukee Art Museum, 2007
- Antarctica on Thin Ice at the United Nations (NYC), 2007
- Remembering Dakota at the North Dakota Museum of Art, 2008
- The Minnesota Eye at the College of Visual Arts, 2009
- NSF Antarctic Artists at the Maryland Science Center, 2009
- New Orleans photographs at the Mill City Museum, 2009
- Animals: Them and Us at the North Dakota Museum of Art, 2009-2010
- The Watery Part of the World at the Minnesota Marine Art Museum, 2011
- Framing the Field at St. Catherine University, 2013
- Land Meets Water at the Artipelag, 2015
- On Place: Three Views of the Land at the Plains Art Museum, 2019
- From Here to the Horizon: Photographs in Honor of Barry Lopez at the Sheldon Museum of Art, 2023
