= Temple Grandin =

American academic and autism activist (born 1947)

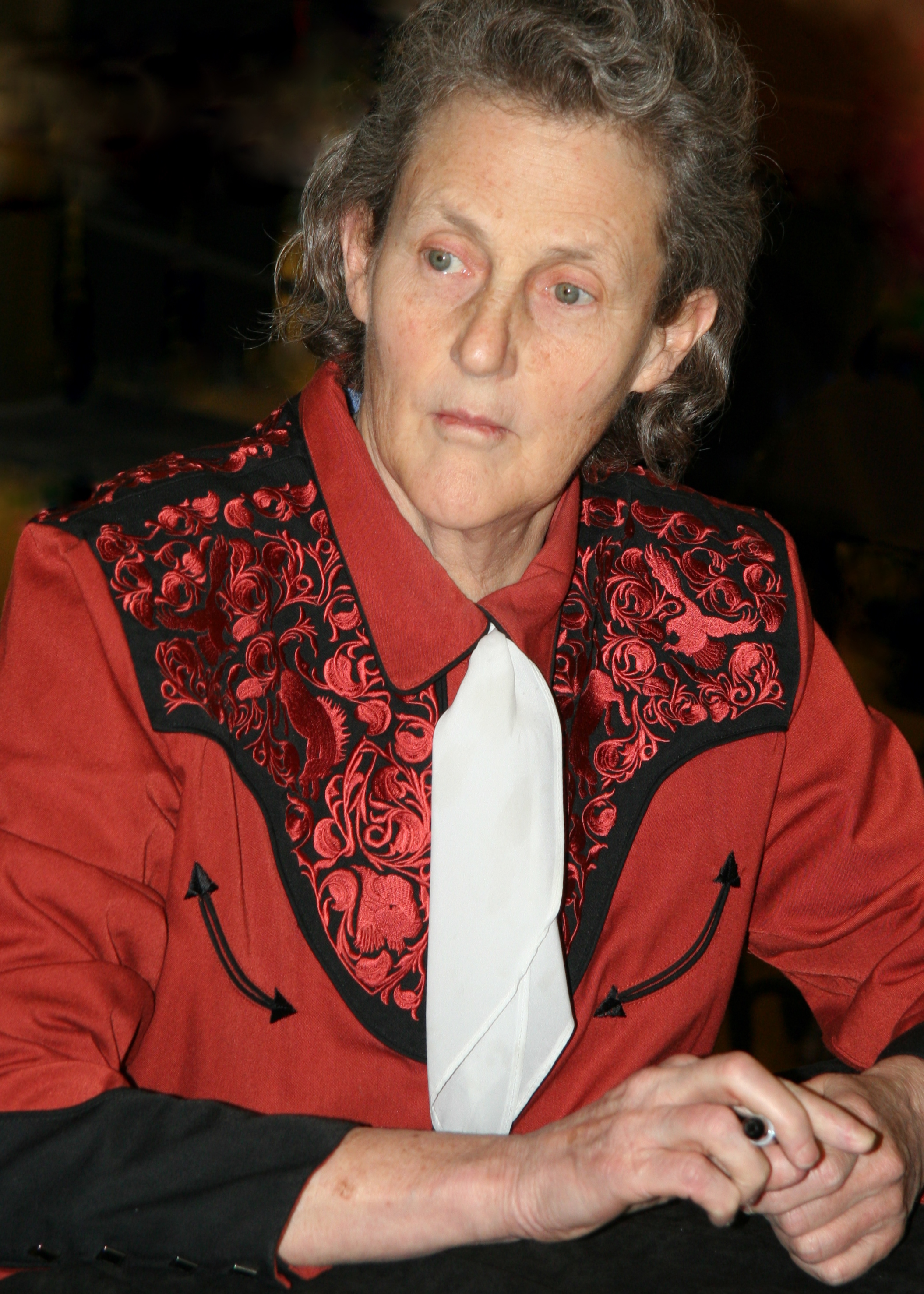
- Grandin in 2011
- Born: Mary Temple Grandin; August 29, 1947 (age 79); Boston, Massachusetts, U.S.
- Education: Franklin Pierce University (BA); Arizona State University (MS); University of Illinois at Urbana–Champaign (PhD)
- Known for: Livestock industry consultancy; Public speaking
- Scientific career
- Fields: Animal science
- Workplaces: Colorado State University
- Author abbrev. (zoology): Grandin
- Website: grandin.com

Mary Temple Grandin (born August 29, 1947) is an American academic, inventor, and ethologist. She is a prominent proponent of the humane treatment of livestock for slaughter and the author of more than 60 scientific papers on animal behavior. Grandin is a consultant to the livestock industry, where she offers advice on animal behavior.

Grandin is one of the first autistic people to document the insights she gained from her personal experiences with autism. She is a faculty member with Animal Sciences in the College of Agricultural Sciences at Colorado State University.

In 2010, Time 100, an annual list of the 100 most influential people in the world, named her in the "Heroes" category. She was the subject of the Primetime Emmy Award- and Golden Globe-winning biographical film Temple Grandin (2010).

== Early life ==
=== Family ===
Mary Temple Grandin was born in Boston, Massachusetts, into a wealthy family. One of the family's employees was also named Mary, so Grandin was referred to by her middle name, Temple, to avoid confusion. Temple's mother was Anna Eustacia Purves (later Cutler), an actress and singer who had a degree in English from Harvard University. Temple's father was Richard McCurdy Grandin, a real estate agent and heir to the largest corporate wheat farm business in the United States at the time, Grandin Farms. Grandin's parents divorced when she was 15, and her mother eventually went on to marry Ben Cutler, a New York saxophonist, in 1965, when Grandin was 18 years old. Temple's grandfather was John Coleman Purves (co-inventor of the aviation autopilot) Grandin has three younger siblings: two sisters and a brother. Grandin has described one of her sisters as being dyslexic. Her younger sister is an artist, her other sister is a sculptor, and her brother is a banker. John Livingston Grandin (Temple's paternal great-grandfather) and his brother William James Grandin were French Huguenots who drilled for oil. John Grandin intended to cut a deal with John D. Rockefeller in a meeting, but the latter kept him waiting so long that he walked out before Rockefeller arrived. The brothers then went into banking, and when Jay Cooke's firm collapsed, they received thousands of acres of undeveloped land in North Dakota as debt collateral. They set up wheat farming in the Red River Valley and housed the workers in dormitories. The town of Grandin, North Dakota, is named after John Livingston Grandin.

Although raised in the Episcopal Church, early on Grandin gave up on a belief in a personal deity or intention in favor of a more scientific perspective.

=== Diagnosis ===
Grandin was not formally diagnosed with autism until her adulthood. When she was two, the only formal diagnosis given to her was "brain damage," a finding finally dismissed through cerebral imaging at the University of Utah by the time she turned 63 in 2010. While Grandin was still in her mid-teens, her mother chanced upon a diagnostic checklist for autism. After reviewing the checklist, Grandin's mother hypothesised that Grandin's symptoms were best explained by the disorder. Grandin was later determined to be an autistic savant.

=== Early childhood ===
When Grandin was a toddler, the medical advice at the time for a diagnosis like hers was to recommend institutionalization, a measure that caused a bitter rift of opinion between Grandin's parents. Her father was keen to follow this advice, while her mother was strongly opposed to the idea.

Grandin's mother took her to the world's leading special needs researchers at the Boston Children's Hospital, with the hope of finding an alternative to institutionalization. Grandin's mother eventually found a neurologist who suggested a trial of speech therapy. A speech therapist was hired and Grandin received personalized training from the age of two and a half. Her mother later hired a nanny when she was aged three-and-a-half to take turns playing games with Temple and her sister. Grandin started kindergarten in Dedham Country Day School. Her teachers and classmates tried to create an environment to accommodate Grandin's needs and sensitivities.

While Grandin has said she considers herself fortunate to have had supportive mentors from elementary school onward, she has also stated that junior high and high school were the most unpleasant times of her life.

=== Middle school and high school ===
Grandin attended Beaver Country Day School from seventh to ninth grade. She was expelled at the age of 14 for throwing a book at a schoolmate who taunted her. Grandin described herself as the "nerdy kid" whom everyone ridiculed. She has described occasions in which she walked down the school hallway and her fellow students would call her a "tape recorder" because she would verbally perseverate. Grandin stated in 2012, "I could laugh about it now, but back then it really hurt."

The year after her expulsion, Grandin's parents divorced. Three years later, Grandin's mother married Ben Cutler, a New York saxophonist. At 15 years old, Grandin spent a summer on the Arizona ranch of Ben Cutler's sister, Ann, and this would become a formative experience toward her subsequent career interest.

Following her expulsion from Beaver Country Day School, Grandin's mother enrolled her at Hampshire Country School in Rindge, New Hampshire. That school was founded in 1948 by Boston child psychologist Henry Patey for the students of "exceptional potential (gifted) that have not been successful in a typical setting." She was accepted there and became Winter Carnival Queen and captain of the hockey team.

Several reports and sources cited the different names of the schools Grandin attended: Beaver Country Day School or Cherry Falls Girls' School (the latter named in her first book, Emergence: Labeled Autistic); and Hampshire Country School or Mountain Day School (the latter called by Grandin in the early books).

At HCS, Grandin met William Carlock, a science teacher who had worked for NASA, who became her mentor and helped her significantly toward building up her self-confidence.

It was Carlock who encouraged Grandin to develop her idea to build her squeeze machine (hug box) when she returned from her aunt's farm in Arizona during her senior year of high school. At the age of 18 when she was still attending Hampshire Country School, with Carlock's and school owner/founder Henry Patey's support, Grandin built the hug box. Carlock's supportive role in Grandin's life continued even after she left Hampshire Country School. As a favor to Henry Patey, the president of the newly founded Franklin Pierce College (5 miles from Hampshire Country School) agreed to accept Temple as a student without the records and files of a typical high school student. When Grandin was facing criticism for her hug box at Franklin Pierce College, it was Carlock who suggested that Grandin undertake scientific experiments to evaluate the efficacy of the device. It was his constant guidance to Grandin to refocus the rigid obsessions she experienced with the hug box into a productive assignment that subsequently allowed this study undertaken by Grandin to be widely cited as evidence of Grandin's resourcefulness.

=== Higher education ===
After she graduated from Hampshire Country School in 1966, Grandin went on to earn her bachelor's degree in human psychology from Franklin Pierce College in 1970, a master's degree in animal science from Arizona State University in 1975, and a doctoral degree in animal science from the University of Illinois at Urbana–Champaign in 1989. After receiving her doctoral degree, Dr. Grandin became a professor at Colorado State University in 1990 and has been teaching in the Department of Animal Sciences there ever since.

== Career ==
=== Autism spectrum ===
In his book NeuroTribes, Steve Silberman wrote that Grandin helped break down years of shame and stigma because she was one of the first adults to publicly disclose that she was autistic. Bernard Rimland, a father of an autistic son and author of the book Infantile Autism, wrote the foreword to Grandin's first book Emergence: Labeled Autistic. Her book was published in 1986. Rimland wrote "Temple's ability to convey to the reader her innermost feelings and fears, coupled with her capacity for explaining mental processes will give the reader an insight into autism that very few have been able to achieve."

In Developing Talents, 2nd Edition, Grandin explores many unnoticed aspects of vocational rehabilitation programs that provide job training and placement for people with disabilities, as well as Social Security Administration programs that offer vocational assistance.

In her later book, Thinking in Pictures, published in 1995, the neurologist Oliver Sacks wrote at the end of the foreword that the book provided "a bridge between our world and hers, and allows us to glimpse into a quite other sort of mind."

In her early writings, Grandin characterized herself as a recovered autistic and, in his foreword, Bernard Rimland used the term recovered autistic individual. In her later writings, she has abandoned this characterization. Steve Silberman wrote, "It became obvious to her, however, that she was not recovered but had learned with great effort to adapt to the social norms of the people around her."

Grandin has said that when her book Thinking in Pictures was published in 1995, she believed that all individuals with autism thought in photographic-specific images the way she did. By the time the expanded edition was published in 2006, she had realized that it had been wrong to presume that every person with autism processed information in the same way she did. In the 2006 edition, she wrote that there were three types of specialized thinking: 1. Visual Thinkers like she is, who think in photographically specific images. 2. Music and Math Thinkers – who think in patterns and may be good at mathematics, chess, and programming computers. 3. Verbal Logic Thinkers – who think in word details, and she noted that their favorite subject may be history.

In one of her later books, The Autistic Brain: Thinking Across the Spectrum, the concept of three different types of thinking by autistic individuals is expanded. This book was published in 2013. An influential book that helped her to develop her concept of pattern thinking was Clara Claiborne Park's book entitled Exiting Nirvana: A Daughter's Life with Autism. It was published in 2001. The Autistic Brain also contains an extensive review of scientific studies that provide evidence that object-visual thinking is different from spatial-visualization abilities.

Grandin became well-known beyond the American autistic community, after being described by Oliver Sacks in the title narrative of his book An Anthropologist on Mars (1995). The title is derived from Grandin's characterization of how she feels around neurotypical people. In the mid-1980s Grandin first spoke in public about autism at the request of Ruth C. Sullivan, one of the founders of the Autism Society of America (ASA). Sullivan writes:

I first met Temple in the mid-1980s [at the] annual [ASA] conference. Standing on the periphery of the group was a tall young woman who was obviously interested in the discussions. She seemed shy and pleasant, but mostly she just listened. I learned her name was Temple Grandin. It wasn't until later in the week that I realized she was someone with autism. I approached her and asked if she'd be willing to speak at the next year's [ASA] conference. She agreed. The next year Temple first addressed an [ASA] audience. People were standing at least three deep. The audience couldn't get enough of her. Here, for the first time, was someone who could tell us from her own experience, what it was like to be extremely sound sensitive ("like being tied to the rail and the train's coming"). She was asked many questions: "Why does my son do so much spinning?" "Why does he hold his hands to his ears?" "Why doesn't he look at me?" She spoke from her own experience, and her insight was impressive. There were tears in more than one set of eyes that day. Temple quickly became a much sought-after speaker in the autism community.

Based on personal experience, Grandin advocates early intervention to address autism and supportive teachers, who can direct fixations of the child with autism in fruitful directions. She has described her hypersensitivity to noise and other sensory stimuli. She says words are her second language and that she thinks "totally in pictures", using her vast visual memory to translate information into a mental slideshow of images that may be manipulated or correlated. Grandin attributes her success as a humane livestock facility designer to her ability to recall detail, which is a characteristic of her visual memory. Grandin compares her memory to full-length movies in her head, that may be replayed at will, allowing her to notice small details. She also is able to view her memories using slightly different contexts by changing the positions of the lighting and shadows.

Grandin does not support eliminating autism genes entirely or treating those she labels "mildly" autistic. However, she believes that autistic children who are severely disabled and nonverbal need therapies "like [applied behavioral analysis] [...] to function", and stated in her book, Thinking in Pictures, "In an ideal world the scientist should find a method to prevent the most severe forms of autism but allow the milder forms to survive." In a March 2022 update to the frequently asked questions section of her official website, Grandin rejected critics' characterization of her position as eugenic.

Grandin has criticized autism-related diagnostic updates originally implemented in 2013 in the fifth edition of the Diagnostic and Statistical Manual of Mental Disorders. When asked about the updates in a 2022 interview, Grandin stated the following:

The spectrum is so broad it doesn’t make much sense. Are we really going to put people with severe autism who cannot dress themselves in the same category as people with mild autism who work in Silicon Valley? It has also made this problem of not learning life skills worse – because even just slightly geeky kids are getting labelled as “on the spectrum”. Where this labelling can be useful is with relationships – it can help with misunderstandings.

For roughly 15 years following the release of Andrew Wakefield's fraudulent 1998 study that falsely linked autism to the MMR vaccine, Grandin publicly speculated that there might be a causal link between vaccines and autism, especially in cases involving children who became non-speaking after the administration of vaccines. Grandin refused to revisit the topic during a January 2022 interview with The New York Times, despite the interviewer repeatedly prompting her to do so.

In March of every year, Grandin hosts a public event at Boston University.

=== Handling livestock ===
In 1980 Grandin published her first two scientific articles on beef cattle behavior during handling: "Livestock Behavior as Related to Handling Facilities Design" in the International Journal for the Study of Animal Problems, Vol. 1, pp. 33–52 and "Observations of Cattle Behavior Applied to the Design of Cattle Handling Facilities," Applied Animal Ethology, Vol. 6, pp. 19–31. She was one of the first scientists to report that animals are sensitive to visual distractions in handling facilities such as shadows, dangling chains, and other environmental details that most people do not notice. When she was awarded her Ph.D. at the University of Illinois, she studied the effects of environmental enrichment on pigs. The title of her dissertation was "Effect of Rearing Environment and Environmental Enrichment on the Behavior and Neural Development in Young Pigs." Grandin expanded her theories in her book, Animals Make Us Human.

In 1993, she edited the first edition of Livestock Handling and Transport. Grandin wrote three chapters and included chapters from contributors from around the world. Subsequent editions of the book were published in 2000, 2007, 2014, 2019, and 2024. In her academic work as a professor at Colorado State University, her graduate student Bridgett Voisinet conducted one of the early studies that demonstrated that cattle who remained calm during handling had higher weight gains. In 1997, when the paper was published, this was a new concept. The paper is entitled, "Feedlot Cattle with Calm Temperaments Have Higher Average Daily Gains Than Cattle with Excitable Temperaments", published in The Journal of Animal Science, Vol. 75, pp. 892–896.

Another important paper published by Grandin was, "Assessment of Stress During Handling and Transport", Journal of Animal Science, 1997, Vol. 75, pp. 249–257. This paper presented the concept that an animal's previous experiences with handling could have an effect on how it will react to being handled in the future, as a new concept in the animal-handling industry.

A major piece of equipment that Grandin developed was a center track (double rail) conveyor restrainer system for holding cattle during stunning at large beef slaughtering plants. The first system was installed in the mid-1980s for calves and a system for large beef cattle was developed in 1990. This system is used by many large meat companies. It is described in "Double Rail Restrainer Conveyor for Livestock Handling", first published in the Journal of Agricultural Engineering Research, Vol. 4, pp. 327–338 in 1988, and "Transferring results of behavioral research to industry to improve animal welfare on the farm, ranch, and slaughter plant", Applied Animal Behavior Science, Vol. 8, pp. 215–228, published in 2003. An electric stunning system for livestock was invented by Grandin (U.S. Patent Number 5,906,540) in 1998.

Grandin also developed an objective, numerical scoring system for assessing animal welfare at slaughtering plants. The use of this scoring system resulted in significant improvements in animal stunning and handling during slaughter. This work is described in "Objective scoring of animal handling and stunning practices in slaughter plants", Journal of the American Veterinary Medical Association, Vol. 212, pp. 3–39, "The feasibility of using vocalization scoring as an indicator of poor welfare during slaughter", Applied Animal Behavior Science, Vol. 56, pp. 121–128, and "Effect of animal welfare audits of slaughter plants by a major fast food company on cattle handling and stunning practices", Journal of the American Veterinary Medical Association, Vol. 216, pp. 848–851.

In 2008, Grandin published Humane Livestock Handling with contributions by Mark Deesing, a long time collaborator of hers. The book contains a review of the main aspects of cattle behavior and provides a visual guide in the form of construction plans and diagrams for the implementation of Grandin's ideas relating to humane livestock handling. Many of her contributions to the field of handling livestock and the design of livestock handling systems advocated for in her books are available through her website as well. Grandin helped design animal processing plants at the White Oak Pastures organic farm in Bluffton, Georgia.

=== Other scientific contributions ===
Grandin is the author or co-author of more than 60 peer-reviewed scientific papers on a variety of other animal behavior subjects. Some of the other subjects are the effect of hair whorl position on cattle behavior, the influence of stress prior to slaughter upon meat quality, religious slaughter, mothering behavior of beef cows, cattle temperament, and causes of bruising.

=== Animal welfare ===
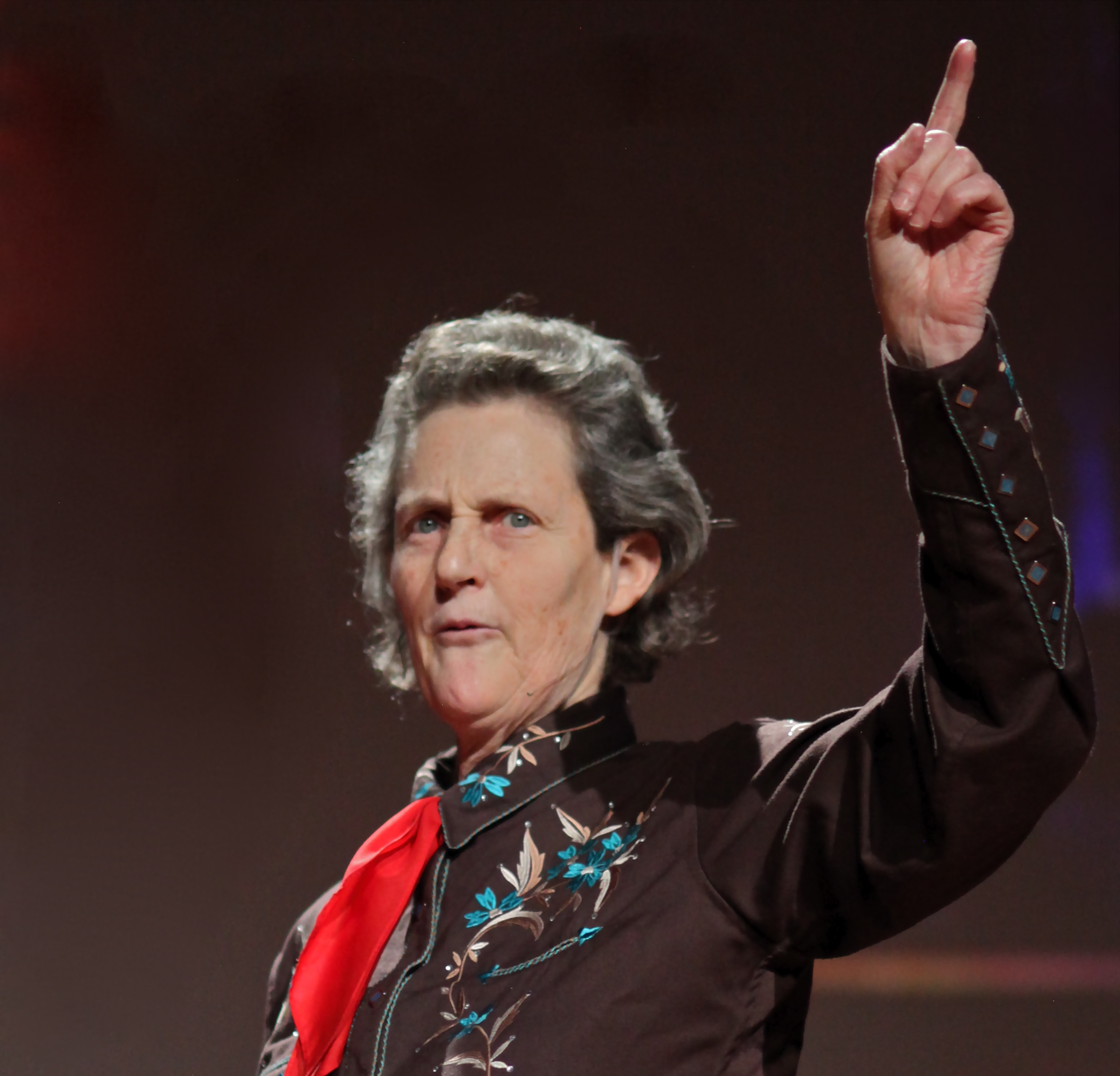
Temple Grandin at TED in February 2010

Grandin has lectured widely about her first-hand experiences of the anxiety of feeling threatened by everything in her surroundings, and of being dismissed and feared, which motivates her work in humane livestock handling processes. She studied the behavior of cattle, how they react to ranchers, movements, objects, and light. Grandin then designed curved corrals she adapted with the intention of reducing stress, panic, and injury in animals being led to slaughter. This has proved to be a further point of criticism and controversy among animal activists who have questioned the congruence of a career built on animal slaughter alongside Grandin's claims of compassion and respect for animals. While her designs are widely used throughout the slaughterhouse industry, her claim of compassion for the animals is that because of her autism she can see the animals' reality from their viewpoint, that when she holds an animal's head in her hands as it is being slaughtered, she feels a deep connection to them.

Her business website promotes the improvement of standards for slaughterhouses and livestock farms.

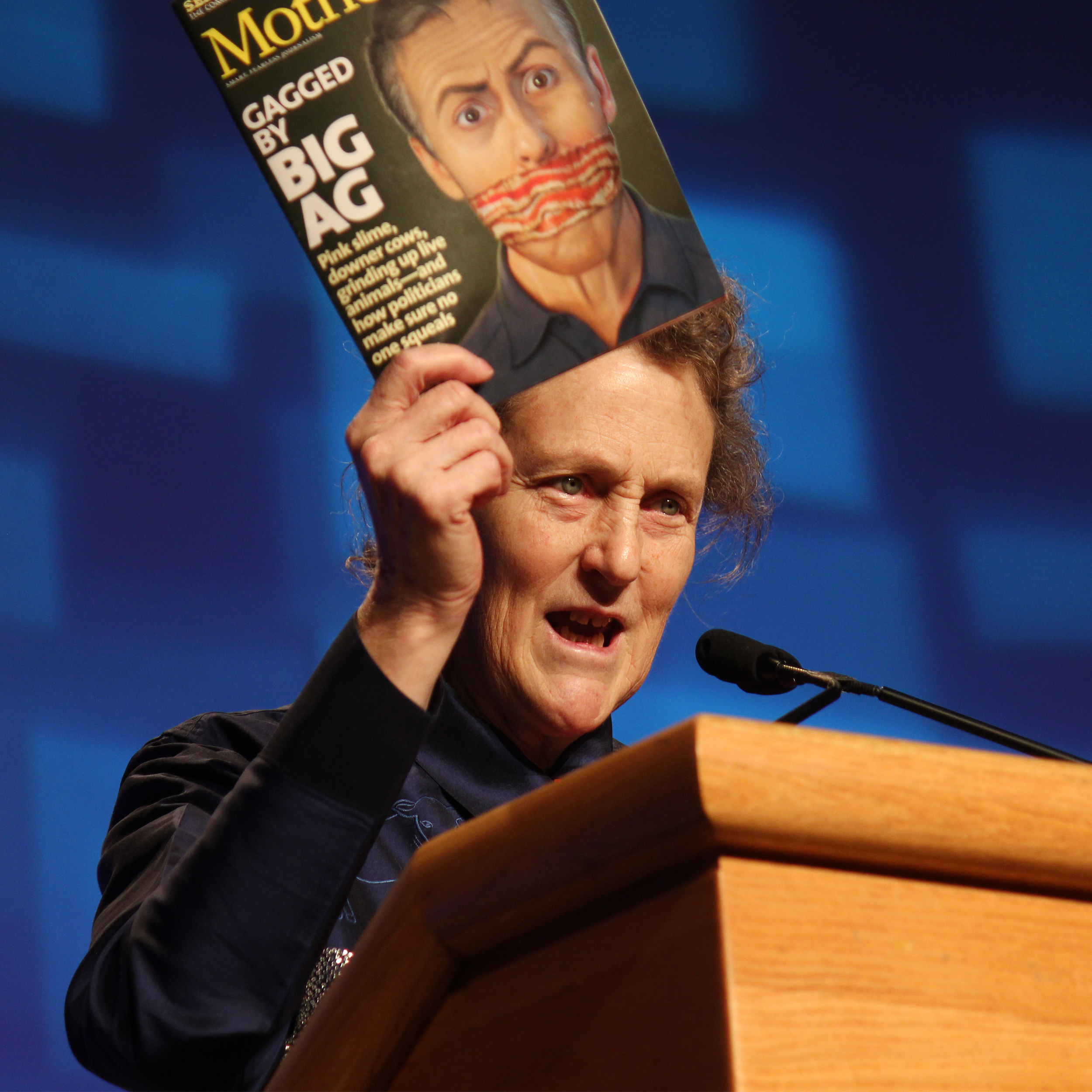
Temple Grandin giving a speech on "pink slime" for the National Association of College and University Food Services 2013 National Conference in Minneapolis

In 2004, Grandin won a "Proggy" award in the "Visionary" category, from People for the Ethical Treatment of Animals.

Among her notable essays about animal welfare is "Animals Are Not Things", in which she posits that while animals can be considered property in a technical sense, the law ultimately gives them ethical protections or rights. She compares the properties and rights of owning cattle, versus owning screwdrivers, enumerating how both may be used to serve human purposes in many ways, but when it comes to inflicting pain, there is a vital distinction between such "properties", because legally, a person can smash or grind up a screwdriver, but cannot torture an animal.

Grandin has credited her insight into the minds of cattle for leading her to value the changes in details to which animals are particularly sensitive and to use her visualization skills to design thoughtful and humane animal-handling equipment. She was named a fellow of the American Society of Agricultural and Biological Engineers in 2009.

In 2012, when the American beef industry was struggling with public perception of its use and sale of pink slime, Grandin spoke out in support of the food product. She said, "It should be on the market. It should be labeled. We should not be throwing away that much beef."

Grandin's work has attracted the attention of philosophers interested in the moral status of animals. Andy Lamey has argued that while Grandin's method of slaughter is a significant positive development for animals, her attempts to formulate a moral defense of meat-eating have been less successful.

I think using animals for food is an ethical thing to do, but we've got to do it right. We've got to give those animals a decent life, and we've got to give them a painless death. We owe the animals respect.

— Temple Grandin, on Errol Morris' series First Person

== Personal life ==
Grandin has noted in her autobiographical works that autism affects every aspect of her life. She has to wear comfortable clothes to counteract her sensory processing disorder and has structured her lifestyle to avoid sensory overload. She regularly takes antidepressants, but no longer uses her squeeze machine, stating in February 2010 that: "It broke two years ago, and I never got around to fixing it. I'm into hugging people now."

While enrolled in boarding school, Grandin chose to live a celibate life. During a 2013 interview with The New York Times, she stated "Now I'm old enough to where sexual urges are all gone, and it's like, good riddance."

== Honors ==
In 2010, Grandin was named in the Time 100 list of the one hundred most influential people in the world, in the "Heroes" category. In 2011, she received a Double Helix Medal. She has received honorary degrees from many universities including McGill University in Canada (1999), and the Swedish University of Agricultural Sciences (2009), Carnegie Mellon University in the United States (2012), Emory University (2016), and North Carolina State University (2018) In 2023, Grandin was awarded an honorary Doctor of Science degree by Iowa State University and was later awarded an honorary Doctor of Veterinary Medicine from Kansas State University. This recognition is her first DVM.

In 2011, Grandin was awarded the Ashoka Fellowship. In 2012, Grandin was inducted into the Colorado Women's Hall of Fame, the Texas Trail of Fame, and the Hall of Great Westerners of the National Cowboy & Western Heritage Museum. Grandin received a Meritorious Achievement Award from the World Organisation for Animal Health (OIE) in 2015. Also in 2015, she was named an honorary fellow of the Society for Technical Communication. In 2016, Grandin was inducted into the American Academy of Arts and Sciences. In 2017, Grandin was inducted into the National Women's Hall of Fame.

On November 15, 2025, Grandin was honored with the National Portrait Gallery's Portrait of a Nation Award. The Award recognizes the honoree "for their transformative contributions to American history and culture" and was presented to her by Claire Danes. The National Portrait Gallery commissioned artist David Lenz to paint Grandin's portrait for inclusion in the Gallery's collection.

== Media ==
Grandin has been featured on major media programs, such as Lisa Davis' It's Your Health, ABC's Primetime Live, the Today Show, Larry King Live, and Fresh Air with Terry Gross. She has been written up in Time magazine, People magazine, Discover magazine, Forbes, and The New York Times. She was the subject of the Horizon documentary "The Woman Who Thinks Like a Cow", first broadcast by the BBC on (2006), and Nick News with Linda Ellerbee (2006). She also was the subject of the first episode in the series First Person by Errol Morris.

Grandin is the focus of a semi-biographical HBO film entitled Temple Grandin, starring Claire Danes as Grandin (2010). It was nominated for 15 Primetime Emmy Awards and won seven, including Outstanding Television Movie and Outstanding Lead Actress in a Miniseries or Movie for Claire Danes. At the 68th Golden Globe Awards (2011), Claire Danes won the Golden Globe Award for Best Actress – Miniseries or Television Film.

Grandin was featured in Beautiful Minds: A Voyage Into the Brain, a documentary produced in 2006 by Colourfield Tell-A-Vision, a German company. She was named one of 2010's one hundred most influential people in the world by Time magazine. In 2011, she was featured in an episode of the Science documentary series Ingenious Minds. In 2018, Grandin was featured in the documentary This Business of Autism, which explored autism employment and the success story of autism employers such as Spectrum Designs Foundation and was produced by Mesh Omnimedia.

She was featured in Michael Pollan's 2006 book, The Omnivore's Dilemma, in which she discussed the livestock industry. Oliver Sacks included a chapter of his visit with her in his 1995 book An Anthropologist on Mars, the book's title referring to Grandin's assessment of being puzzled by complex emotions and games people play. "Much of the time," she told Sacks, "I feel like an anthropologist on Mars."

Folk-punk band AJJ included two songs called "Temple Grandin" and "Temple Grandin Too" on their LP Christmas Island. In 2017, Grandin was the focus of a children's book by author Julia Finlay Mosca titled The Girl Who Thought In Pictures, A Story of Temple Grandin.

In 2018, Grandin was profiled in the book Rescuing Ladybugs by author and animal advocate Jennifer Skiff as a "global hero" for "standing her ground and fighting for change after witnessing the extreme mistreatment of animals" used in farming. In 2023, author Brad Meltzer and illustrator Chris Eliopoulos released the children's book I am Temple Grandin as a part of the "Ordinary People Change the World" series. The book was later adapted into an episode for the PBS show Xavier Riddle and the Secret Museum.

== Publications ==
=== Books ===
- Emergence: Labeled Autistic (with Margaret Scariano, 1986, updated 1991), ISBN 0-446-67182-7
- The Learning Style of People with Autism: An Autobiography (1995). In Teaching Children with Autism: Strategies to Enhance Communication and Socialization, Kathleen Ann Quill, ISBN 0-8273-6269-2
- Thinking in Pictures: Other Reports from My Life with Autism (1996) ISBN 0-679-77289-8
- Developing Talents: Careers for Individuals with Asperger Syndrome and High-Functioning Autism (2004). ISBN 1-931282-56-0
- Animals in Translation: Using the Mysteries of Autism to Decode Animal Behavior (with Catherine Johnson, 2005), ISBN 0-7432-4769-8
- The Unwritten Rules of Social Relationships: Decoding Social Mysteries Through the Unique Perspectives of Autism (with Sean Barron, 2005), ISBN 1-932565-06-X
- Livestock Handling and Transport (2007). ISBN 978-1-84593-219-0. CABI, UK.
- The Way I See It: A Personal Look at Autism and Asperger's (2008), ISBN 9781932565720
- Animals Make Us Human: Creating the Best Life for Animals (with Catherine Johnson, 2009), ISBN 978-0-15-101489-7
- Improving Animal Welfare: A Practical Approach (2010). ISBN 978-1-84593-541-2, CABI, UK
- The Autistic Brain: Thinking Across the Spectrum (with Richard Panek, 2013), ISBN 978-0-547-63645-0
- Genetics and the Behavior of Domestic Animals, Second Edition (with Mark Deesing, 2013), ISBN 978-0-12-394586-0
- Calling All Minds: How to Think and Create Like an Inventor (2018) ISBN 1524738204
- The Loving Push: How Parents and Professionals Can Help Spectrum Kids Become Successful Adults (with Debra Moore Ph.D., 2016), ISBN 978-1941765203
- Visual Thinking: The Hidden Gifts of People Who Think in Pictures, Patterns, and Abstractions (2022) ISBN 0593418360
- Navigating Autism: 9 Mindsets for Helping Kids on the Spectrum (with Debra Moore, Ph.D., 2021). ISBN 978-0-393-71484-5

=== Selected academic works ===
- Grandin, T. 1989 (Updated 1999). "Behavioral Principles of Livestock Handling". Professional Scientist. December 1989 (pages 1–11).
- Grandin, T. 1994. "Euthanasia and Slaughter of Livestock". Journal of American Veterinary Medical Association. Volume 204:1354–1360.
- Grandin, T. 1995. "Restraint of Livestock. Proceedings: Animal Behaviour Design of Livestock and Poultry Systems" International Conference (pages 208–223). Published by: Northeast Regional Agriculture Engineering Service. Cooperative Extension. 152 Riley – Robb Hall, Ithaca, New York, 14853 USA.
- Grandin, T. 1996. "Factors That Impede Animal Movement at Slaughter Plants". Journal of the American Veterinary Medical Association. 209 No.4:757–759.
- Grandin, T. 2001. "Cattle vocalizations are associated with handling and equipment problems at beef slaughter plants". Applied Animal Behaviour Science. Volume 71, 2001, Pg. 191–201.
- Grandin, T. 2013. "Making slaughterhouses more humane for cattle, pigs, and sheep". Annual Review of Animal Biosciences. 1:491–512.

== See also ==
- Wendy Jacob
