= Emily Gerson Saines =

American talent manager

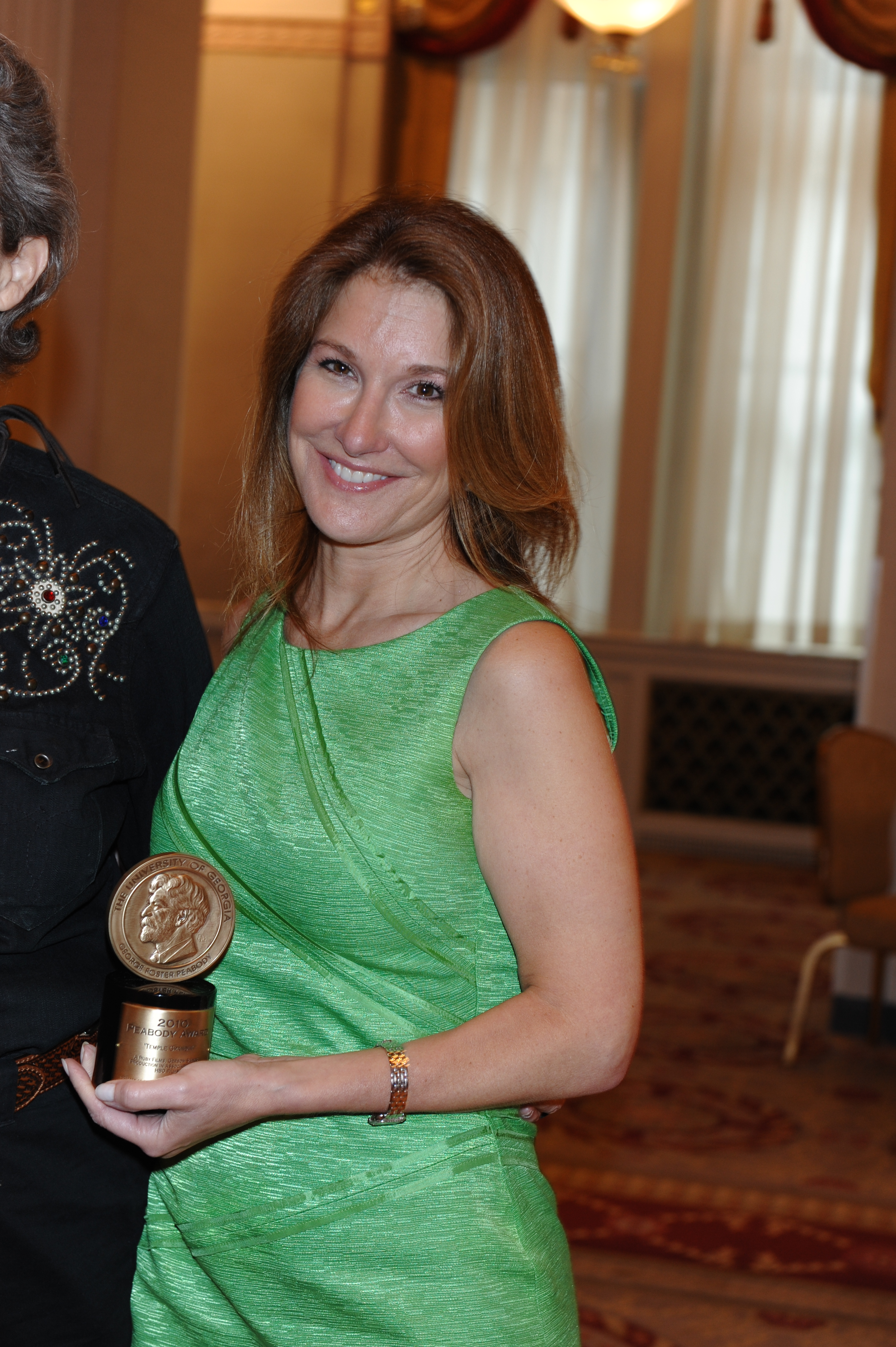
- Saines in 2011
- Born: New York City, New York, U.S.
- Education: Dana Hall School Northwestern University
- Occupations: Talent manager, producer

Emily Gerson Saines is an American talent manager and producer.

== Biography ==
=== Early life ===
Gerson Saines was born in New York City to Barry David and Karen Rita (Goldman) Gerson. She graduated from Northwestern University with a degree in Radio/Television/Film.

=== Career ===
Gerson Saines began her career as an assistant at Creative Artists Agency and first became an agent at Agency for the Performing Arts. She went on to become a vice president at the William Morris Agency, where she represented clients such as Angelina Jolie, Scarlett Johansson, and Robert Downey Jr.

In 1998, she left William Morris to form her own talent management company, Gerson Saines Management. The company would later become Brookside Artist Management, where her clients include(d), among others, Sebastian Stan, Kieran Culkin, Macaulay Culkin, Daveed Diggs, Ansel Elgort, Cynthia Nixon, Maria Bakalova, Brenda Song, Anson Mount, Grace Van Patten, and Vanessa Williams.

Gerson Saines made her producing debut with the television film The Courage to Love, starring Vanessa Williams, and executive produced Foster Hall for NBC with Conan O'Brien.

In 2010, she served as executive producer for the HBO film Temple Grandin starring Claire Danes, David Strathairn, Catherine O'Hara, and Julia Ormond. Temple Grandin aired February 2010 and received seven Emmy Awards including Outstanding Made for Television Movie. Temple Grandin also received three Golden Globe Award nominations, a Peabody Award, an American Film Institute AFI Award, the Princess Grace AMADE medal at the Monte Carlo Television Festival, an International Press Academy Satellite Award, the US Department of Health & Human Services Voice Award, a 2010 WIN Award, A Producers Guild of America Award Nomination, a Los Angeles Times Gold Derby TV Award nomination, a Critics' Choice Award Nomination, a Television Critics Association Award nomination, and the 2010 Humanitas Prize.

Gerson Saines' producing projects include the critically acclaimed HBO Max television series Tokyo Vice, written by J.T. Rogers and directed by Michael Mann as well as the Starz television spin-off of Blindspotting, co-written by Daveed Diggs and Rafael Casal. Blindspotting was nominated for Short Form Breakthrough Series at the 2021 Gotham Awards and Best New Scripted Series at the 2022 Independent Spirit Awards.
