= Antarctic Artists and Writers Program =

The Antarctic Artists and Writers Program is a research program funded and managed by the United States National Science Foundation which assists artists and writers who wish to work in Antarctica.

== Notable participants ==
- Werner Herzog, filmmaker, Encounters at the End of the World
- Richard Panek, popular science writer, The 4 Percent Universe
- Kim Stanley Robinson, science fiction author, Antarctica
