= The Autistic Brain =

2013 nonfiction popular science book

- Hardcover edition
- Author: Temple Grandin and Richard Panek
- Audio read by: Andrea Gallo
- Language: English
- Subject: Neuroscience, psychology, autism
- Publisher: Houghton Mifflin Harcourt
- Publication date: April 30, 2013
- Publication place: United States
- Media type: Print, e-book, audiobook
- Pages: 240
- ISBN: 9780547636450

The Autistic Brain: Thinking Across the Spectrum is a 2013 nonfiction popular science book written by Temple Grandin and Richard Panek and published by Houghton Mifflin Harcourt. It discusses Grandin's life experiences as an autistic person from the early days of scientific research on the topic and how advances in technology have revolutionized the understanding of autism and its connection to the brain.

Different releases of the book came with alternative subtitles, including Exploring the Strength of a Different Kind of Mind and Helping Different Kinds of Minds Succeed.

== Content ==
Laid out into two sections with four chapters each, the first half of the book is titled "Looking At The Autistic Brain", which is followed by the latter half titled "Rethinking The Autistic Brain". The book also has an index and notes section for easy reference and page finding.

The book begins in its first chapter by discussing autism itself and how Grandin was treated as a child by medical professionals before autism was properly understood or considered a medical diagnosis. The following chapters investigate the biological background of autism and how historically it was claimed to be either the result of direct brain damage or poor parenting and how the practice of diagnostic classification, or nosology, negatively impacted the understanding of autistic people. Several chapters then focus on advances in neuroscience and neuroimaging in particular. The benefit of such technology and modern understandings of genetics is contrasted with the fact that many aspects of autism and related conditions may never be completely known due to neuroplasticity and how there is no one single biological answer due to variances in individuals.

A major focus of the book is on how autism affects someone's broader life, including problems in the input of sensory information for many autistic people. Later chapters also further concern themselves with medical diagnosis of autism and how changes to the topic from the Diagnostic and Statistical Manual of Mental Disorders-IV to DSM-5 fail to properly explain the complete nature of the condition and the behavioral and interpersonal components of it beyond just the merely physiological. According to the book, the great amount of variation between autistic people is also poorly considered by the DSM having a "single descriptor outside of the context of an individual's unique circumstances". Grandin suggests that the sharp rise in diagnoses of autism-spectrum conditions has been due to this rigid DSM definition resulting in doctors misapplying the label of autism and also grouping in a vast range of other conditions, such as those with Asperger's.

Finally, the book ends with an expanded emphasis on Grandin's life and the strengths autistic people have, including attention to detail, pattern identification, and more that benefits them in mainstream society. Grandin suggests as a closing that children should be defined by their strengths rather than by their deficits.

== Style and tone ==
Diana Baker in the journal Disability & Society wrote that the "distinctive character" of the book is helped by its clear writing and sharable insights and anecdotes. Though it can at times feel a "little too light" due to too many diagrams, listed points, and a conflict in style between the two authors, to the point that it doesn't properly contain Grandin's "unique speaking style". Nature journal editor Sara Abdulla notes how the book is more well-organized than Grandin's previous works thanks to the involvement of Panek's writing style, though laments that it loses some of her "unique voice".

== Critical reception ==
A Kirkus Reviews writer described the book as an "illuminating look at how neuroscience opens a window into the mind". Booklist reviewer Henry Carrigan Jr. stated that, through the book, Grandin "revolutionizes our way of thinking about autism" and showcases that general labeling will never be effective and that each person needs to be diagnosed and treated as an individual. Writing for Scientific American, Scott Barry Kaufman was "deeply frustrated" by the book and the contradictions of claims between the multiple voices he noted in the book's writing and questions whether any form of biological investigation is going to lead to a better understanding of autism and the individual. Melissa Bernstein and Erin Burch in the journal Reclaiming Children and Youth point out that The Autistic Brain gives "strength-based language with which to talk about autism" that helps to provide a "clear and cohesive message of consilience" across multiple scientific disciplines.

For Library Journal, Terry Lamperski recommends the book as reading material for "anyone who knows or works with people on the spectrum" and praises that the book manages to take a technical topic and make it clear for nonscientific readers. New York Times reviewer David Dobbs found the book to be disappointing because of its focus on brain research and feels like Grandin tying her medical findings on herself into the topic took away "from the realms where she excels". Publishers Weekly approves of Grandin's "particular skill" that allows her to "make sense of autistics' experiences" and give readers a look into her own lived world as an individual.

The audiobook version released across seven CDs was read by Andrea Gallo and whose serious and critical tone when discussing the scientific portions of the book was praised by Publishers Weekly.
