= Lord's Acre Movement =

International social movement that originated in Georgia in 1922

The Lord's Acre Movement is an international social movement that originated in Bluffton, Georgia in 1922, when Rev. Henry M. Melton asked each of the farmers in his congregation to set aside one acre of farmland, donating the proceeds of "the Lord's acres" to the church. After word spread that the acres were untouched by the boll weevil, the "Lord's Acre" quickly expanded into an international and interdenominational phenomenon, particularly after its success was reported in Time Magazine. As of 2013, the Lord's Acre Movement continues to provide funding for churches, having expanded "beyond farmland to include projects of donated time and service, and to auctions and sales featuring homemade goods, arts, and crafts."

== History ==
=== Origins in Bluffton, Georgia ===
In 1922, Reverend Henry M. Melton asked farmers in his congregation to sign an agreement donating the proceeds from one acre of cotton to the church. The agreement read:

We, the undersigned farmer members of the Bluffton Baptist Church, hereby agree to plant, cultivate and harvest one acre from our farm, said acre to be known as the Lord's acre. We agree to turn the proceeds of said acre in to a committee appointed by the Church. They are to dispose of same and distribute the funds derived from it in such a way as we may instruct.

The agreement was signed by seven men: J. B. Goodman, Dauss King, E. L. Gay, A. M. Hubbard, J. E. Shaw, W. G. Rish, and J. A. Mansfield.

After the acres were reportedly unharmed by the boll weevil in 1923, "belief spread that miracles had been performed at Bluffton." The church, town officials, and even the local banker began to receive inquiries from around the United States and Europe. By 1924, 100 churches in the Georgia Baptist Convention instituted similar programs, expecting to raise a combined total of $20,000 from their efforts.

=== The Lord's Acre Plan ===
In 1927, Jim McClure, head of the Farmer's Federation of Western North Carolina, announced his support for a Lord's Acre initiative:

An acre of potatoes, or corn for the Lord, on every farm in this section! What a spiritual awakening this would bring ... A few years ago the members of a church in Georgia all agreed to plant an acre of cotton for the church. The Lord's Acres of cotton did well, and brought in a rich harvest to the church, not only in money but also in enthusiasm and power. ...

The Lord's Acre Plan was established in 1930, and under the leadership of Dumont Clarke the project grew to include over one thousand churches in twenty different denominations. Lord's Acres were established throughout the United States, and internationally in India, China, Brazil, Mexico, and Japan.

== In popular culture ==
=== God's Little Acre ===
In God's Little Acre, a 1933 novel by Erskine Caldwell, a character named Ty Ty Walden is portrayed as a widower who owns a small farm in South Carolina. Ty Ty is obsessed with finding gold on his land. He has promised to donate any profits generated by 1 acre (4,000 m2) of the farm to the church, but is terrified that gold will be found on "God's acre", so he keeps moving the acre around.

Since God's Little Acre contained scenes of (what was then considered) explicit sexuality, the New York Society for the Suppression of Vice took Caldwell and Viking Press to court for disseminating pornography. More than 60 authors, editors, and literary critics rallied in support of the book, and Judge Benjamin Greenspan of the New York Magistrates' Court ruled in its favor. The court case is still considered a major decision in the establishment of artists' First Amendment rights in freedom of expression.

== News & Media ==
April 10, 2013: Early County News: Georgia Historical Society Erects Historical Marker at Bluffton Baptist Church http://www.earlycountynews.com/news/2013-04-10/Front_Page/The_Lords_Acre.html
