= The Trouble with Gravity =

2019 popular science book by Richard Panek

- Hardcover edition
- Author: Richard Panek
- Language: English
- Publisher: Houghton Mifflin Harcourt
- Publication date: July 9, 2019
- Publication place: United States
- Media type: Print, e-book
- Pages: 256
- ISBN: 9780544526747

The Trouble with Gravity: Solving the Mystery Beneath Our Feet is a nonfiction popular science book by Richard Panek and published by Houghton Mifflin Harcourt on July 9, 2019.

== Content ==
The book begins its first chapter by discussing ancient history and old beliefs regarding gravity and what lies above. This includes a discussion of belief in gods and how those religious views were shaped by the existence of gravity and its prevalence on living beings and all matter. The topics of Mount Olympus and stories among Aboriginal cultures in Australia are discussed in how the sky is believed to be separate from the earth and creates a separation between humans and the divine. The book points out that gravity was often seen in such context as something that only affects people on Earth and not as a universal force. Authors and those more on the philosophical end of the topic are also considered, including Dante Alighieri and Ernst Mach.

The second chapter investigates how gravity formed from the beginning of the universe and also how the Big Bang may have created a large number of parallel universes and that gravity is not sourced in our universe, but is leaking through spacetime into ours. Then, Panek moves on to human history and how the motion of gravity was first discovered, identifying the revolution that Isaac Newton's theories on gravity had on the general public. A series of other scientists and their chronological discoveries about gravity are delved into, including John Philoponus, Nicolaus Copernicus, Galileo Galilei, Albert Einstein, and Werner Heisenberg.

== Style and tone ==
Publishers Weekly noted that the book's "inquisitive, fine-tuned narrative is full of character" and that it departs from other science books on similar topics by having a "friendly casualness of a coffee-shop chat". The heavy topics and complex science investigated in the book have the potential to bog down the reader, Undark Magazine writer Dan Falk pointed out, but Panek's writing style manages to deliver the topic with "humility and humor".

== Critical reception ==
Kirkus Reviews calls The Trouble With Gravity a "useful primer on a force that still inspires mystery" and that, despite philosophical shortcomings that some may have, others will "enjoy Panek’s expert description" on the complex field of study. Clara Moskowitz for Scientific American writes that this "beautiful and philosophical investigation of nature’s weakest force" will help provide insights to readers, despite not being able to answer the fundamental question regarding gravity. Library Journal reviewer Sara R. Tompson calls it "one of the best of the postgravitational-waves-discovery physics books" and that all readers would find the text accessible. Shelf Awareness calls the book's glimpse into the mysteries of gravity "thought-provoking" and that while any definitive answers may not be forthcoming, The Trouble With Gravity still gives "much to contemplate".
