= Spectrum Designs Foundation =

American autism employment organization

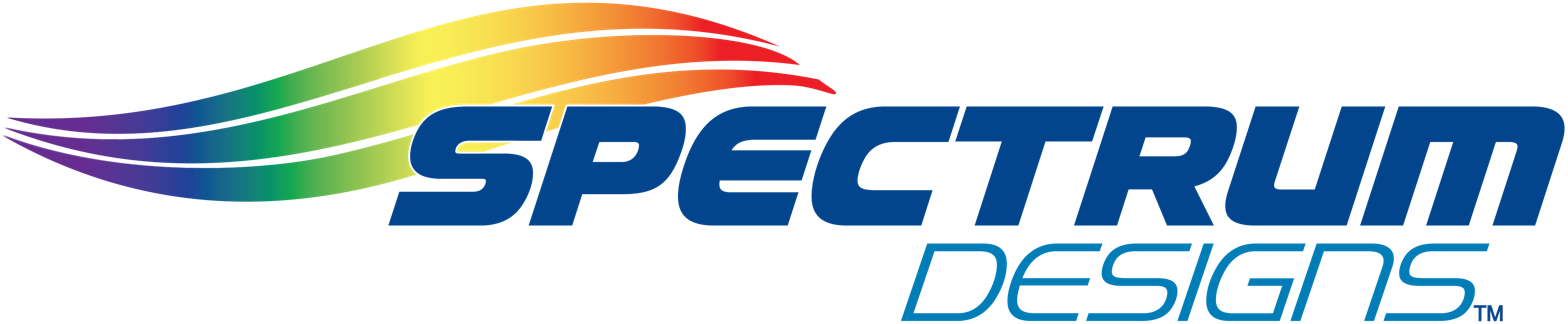
- Founded: February 11, 2011; 15 years ago
- Founders: Patrick Bardsley, Nicole Sugrue, Stella Spanakos
- Tax ID no.: 27-5020830
- Legal status: 501(c)(3) nonprofit organization
- Headquarters: Port Washington, New York
- Coordinates: 40.8303747°N 73.7018944°W
- Services: Employment, Job Creation, Disability Services
- Co-Founder & CEO: Patrick Bardsley
- Chief Operating Officer: Tim Howe
- Chief of Staff: Marissa Borzykowski
- Subsidiaries: Spectrum Bakes; Spectrum Suds
- Revenue: $7,464,700 (2024)
- Expenses: $7,390,088 (2024)
- Employees: 90 (2024)
- Website: www.spectrumdesigns.org

Spectrum Designs Foundation is an autism employment nonprofit organization in the United States that provides employment opportunities to teens and young adults on the Autism spectrum through a custom apparel and promotional products business based in Port Washington, New York. It was founded in February 2011 by Patrick Bardsley, Stella Spanakos, and Nicole Sugrue, alongside the Nicholas Center for Autism.

Founded in a barn in co‑founder Stella Spanakos' backyard, Spectrum Designs experienced rapid early growth and by 2015 had grown at an average rate of 80% year-over-year.

Spectrum Designs is prominently featured in the feature‑length documentary This Business of Autism, produced by Mesh Omnimedia. The documentary includes commentary from prominent figures in the autism and employment communities, including Temple Grandin, Michael S. Bernick, Elaine Phillips, and then–Nassau County District Attorney Madeline Singas.

Spectrum Designs was mentioned in a 2016 article in Forbes titled "Where Is Autism Employment Heading in 2017?"

In the spring of 2018, Spectrum Designs completed the purchase of a 7,400‑square‑foot facility in Port Washington, New York.

In the summer of 2018, Spectrum executives Patrick Bardsley and Tim Howe appeared on the business news television network Cheddar in a segment titled "How to Help Individuals with Autism Enter the Job Market."

== Recognition and impact ==
Spectrum Designs Foundation has received national recognition for its employment model supporting adults on the autism spectrum. The organization has been featured in national and regional media outlets for demonstrating how neurodiverse talent can drive business growth and operational excellence.

In February 2025, Spectrum Designs made its national daytime television debut on The Kelly Clarkson Show, where co‑founder and chief executive officer Patrick Bardsley and social media specialist Kelli Fisher discussed the nonprofit’s employment practices and their impact on autistic adults.

Media coverage surrounding the appearance highlighted the organization’s growth from a small startup to a nationally recognized autism employment nonprofit, including record sales exceeding $6 million in 2024 and partnerships with major commercial brands.

Spectrum Designs Foundation holds a four‑star (100%) rating from Charity Navigator for accountability and financial transparency.

In 2025, Spectrum Designs Foundation received a $75,000 grant from the Steven & Alexandra Cohen Foundation to support sustainable operations within its Spectrum Suds program, including the acquisition of an all‑electric delivery vehicle.

Spectrum Designs leaders and staff have participated in national and academic discussions on neuroinclusive employment, including panels hosted by NEXT for AUTISM focused on workforce inclusion and disability employment practices.

In April 2026, Spectrum Designs Foundation announced its expansion into New Jersey, opening a facility in Hackensack to create additional employment opportunities for neurodivergent adults. The expansion marked the organization’s first location outside New York.
