= Animals in Translation =

Book by Temple Grandin and Catherine Johnson

- Author: Temple Grandin; Catherine Johnson
- Subject: Ethology, autism
- Genre: Non-fiction
- Publication date: 2005
- Pages: 356 pp.
- ISBN: 9780743247696

Animals in Translation: Using the Mysteries of Autism to Decode Animal Behavior is a 2005 book by Temple Grandin and co-written by Catherine Johnson. Animals in Translation explores the similarity between animals and autistic people, a concept that was originally touched upon in Grandin's 1995 book Thinking in Pictures: My Life with Autism.

== Background ==
Temple Grandin is a specialist in animal behavior, has received a Ph.D. from the University of Illinois, and is a professor at Colorado State University. Grandin works as a consultant to the American beef industry, designing slaughterhouse equipment that has been extensively adopted within the United States agricultural industry, even being employed by McDonald's. An estimated 90% of all cattle slaughtered in the United States and Canada are done so according to standards and equipment designed by Grandin. Oliver Sacks's 1995 book An Anthropologist on Mars included Grandin as part of a neurological study. This book first brought Grandin to the public's attention, with her self description of her experiences being like an "anthropologist on Mars" being used as the title.

== Content ==
Now I'm writing this book because I wish animals could have more than just a low-stress life and a quick, painless death. I wish animals could have a good life, too, with something useful to do. I think we owe them that.

— Temple Grandin

In Grandin's second book Thinking in Pictures: My Life with Autism (released in 1995), she explained how her brain receives input as a neurotypical person's brain does, but, rather than converting it into words, it remains visual. Animals in Translation expands on this concept, suggesting that her autism allows her to focus on visual details more intensely, which allows her to "take in the world as animals do". Grandin suggests that autistic people are similar to animals, as they "see, feel and think in remarkably similar ways". Based on this idea, Grandin goes on to explain that all animals are more intelligent and more sensitive than humans assume them to be, and should be given a "good life...with something useful to do".

In Animals in Translation, Grandin explains her theory of why autistic people and animals are so similar. Grandin's theory is that the frontal lobes of autistic people do not function the same as those of neurotypical people, and the brain function of an autistic person falls "between human and animal". Grandin goes on to explain that while neurotypical people are good at seeing the "big picture", autistic people are more detail oriented. Grandin's sensitivity to details has allowed her to see things that humans have been doing to animals for years that are "traumatizing" them, even maintaining a list of "18 tiny details that scare farm animals". The list includes things such as reflections on smooth metal, jiggling chains, and one-way gates.
