= Richard Panek =

American popular science writer

- Born: Chicago, Illinois, U.S.
- Education: B.S., Journalism, Northwestern University; M.F.A., fiction, University of Iowa
- Occupations: Author, Science Communicator
- Spouse: Meg Wolitzer
- Writing career
- Years active: 1995–present
- Period: 1995–present
- Genres: non-fiction, popular science
- Subjects: Space, the universe, gravity, autism
- Notable works: The Trouble With Gravity; The Autistic Brain; The 4 Percent Universe; The Invisible Century
- Notable awards: New York Foundation for the Arts Fellowship Guggenheim Foundation Fellowship Antarctic Artists and Writers Program Grant American Institute of Physics 2012 Science Communication Award for Journalism
- Website: richardpanek.net

Richard Panek is an American popular science writer, columnist, and journalist who specializes in the topics of space, the universe, and gravity.

He has published several books and has written articles for a number of news outlets and scientific organizations, including Scientific American, WIRED, New Scientist, and Discover.

== Education and career ==
Born in Chicago, Panek received his Bachelor's of Science in journalism from Northwestern University's Medill School of Journalism and then a Master of Fine Arts in fiction from the University of Iowa's Iowa Writers' Workshop. His writing career began with his short fiction publications in papers like the Chicago Tribune and the New York Times.

He went on to be a faculty adviser for Goddard College for their Master's Creative Writing program and also taught creative writing classes at Barnard College. He is also a frequent speaker and presenter at writing seminars for Johns Hopkins University.

In 2003 Panek donated the writing material for his first book, Waterloo Diamonds, to be a special collection at the University of Northern Iowa.

He was one of three screenwriters for the giant-screen 2015 film Robots.

=== The Last Word On Nothing ===
Panek first joined the multi-author blog known as The Last Word On Nothing after being invited as a contributor by Ann Finkbeiner.

== Awards and grants ==
For his early short fiction work in various newspapers, Panek was given the PEN Award for Syndicated Fiction in 1989, leading to him delivering readings of his work at the Library of Congress. In 2007, he received a Fellowship for science writing from the New York Foundation for the Arts. It was in 2008 that he received an additional fellowship for the same, but from the Guggenheim Foundation, along with a grant from the Antarctic Artists and Writers Program as awarded by the National Science Foundation. The American Institute of Physics gave Panek the 2012 Science Communication Award for Journalism after the publication of his book The 4 Percent Universe. The Goodreads Choice Awards for 2013 in Nonfiction was given to Panek and his co-author Temple Grandin for their book The Autistic Brain.

== Bibliography ==
- — (2024). Pillars of Creation: How the James Webb Telescope Unlocked the Secrets of the Cosmos. Little, Brown and Company. ISBN 9780316570718.
- — (2019). The Trouble with Gravity: Solving the Mystery Beneath Our Feet. HMH Books. ISBN 9780544568297.
- —; Grandin, Temple (2013). The Autistic Brain: Thinking Across the Spectrum. Houghton Mifflin Harcourt. ISBN 9780547636450.
- — (2011). The 4 Percent Universe: Dark Matter, Dark Energy, and the Race to Discover the Rest of Reality. Houghton Mifflin Harcourt. ISBN 9780618982448.
- — (2004). The Invisible Century: Einstein, Freud, and the Search for Hidden Universes. Viking Press. ISBN 9780143035527.
- — (1999). Seeing and Believing: How the Telescope Opened Our Eyes and Minds to the Heavens. Penguin Books. ISBN 9780140280616.
- — (1995). Waterloo Diamonds: A Midwestern Town and Its Minor League Team. St. Martin's Press. ISBN 9780312132095.
