= White Oak Pastures =

Large organic farm in Georgia, USA

- Interactive map of White Oak Pastures
- Town/City: Bluffton, Georgia
- Country: United States
- Coordinates: 31.5209°N 84.8660°W
- Established: After the Civil War
- Owner: Will Harris
- Area: 3,200-acre (13 km^{2})

White Oak Pastures is an organic farm in Bluffton, Georgia. As of 2015, it is the largest and most diverse organic farm in Georgia. As of 2020, the farm was 3,200 acres. The farm grows vegetables and raises animals including goats, hogs, chickens, sheep, and ducks. The farm is run by Will Harris and his family, who are the fourth generation of their lineage to run the farm. It is the only farm in the United States with federally approved slaughterhouses. The farm has been recognized for its progressive, no-waste, regenerative agriculture practices, including regenerative grazing.

== History and practices ==
White Oak Pastures was founded at the end of the Civil War in a rural area of southwest Georgia. When it was passed down father to son, it expanded into a truck farm. The next generation's ownership introduced a cow-calf operation that used modern practices such as hormones, antibiotics, pesticides, and synthetic fertilizers. In the 1990s, Will Harris began to pay more attention to the less-than-ideal treatment and general poor health of cattle being grown and processed by conventional methods. For example, cattle raised at White Oak Pastures would need to be shipped elsewhere for processing, which often involved spending "30 hours on [a] truck, with the ones on the bottom getting covered in feces and urine".

In 1995, Harris began transitioning to holistic agriculture practices, which included ceasing common practices such as feeding cows growth hormones. In 2000, White Oak discontinued its use of chemical fertilizers. In 2006, it began selling their meat to Whole Foods Market. In 2008, White Oak Pastures opened the first federally approved, on-site slaughterhouses, where it began processing cattle into beef. In 2010, it constructed a chicken processing plant. Both animal facilities were designed in part by Temple Grandin.

In 2014, the farm's overall sales had reached around $28 million. In 2015, the farm was recognized by The Savory Institute as a leader in regenerative agriculture practices. In 2020, Forbes reported the farm's overall sales at $20 million.

In 2021, White Oak Pastures settled a class action lawsuit (for $100,000 in wages), to resolve allegations from workers who claimed they were shorted on overtime pay.

It is a supplier for General Mills' EPIC Provisions brand.

Owner of White Oak Pastures, Will Harris, is also a hub leader for the Savory Institute. In an interview for the New York Times, Harris said that confederate general Robert E. Lee was one of his "heroes".

== Environmental impacts ==
A 2020 study, wholly funded by General Mills which stocks meat from White Oak Pastures, examined the environmental impact of multi-species pasture rotation at White Oak Pastures. The study found that emissions per animal were higher on White Oak Pastures than in conventional livestock systems, but that soil carbon sequestration from the farm over 20 years was higher, which led to net 66% lower emissions footprint than conventional, commodity production systems for beef, pork, and poultry - however, it also found that the system required 2.5 times as much land as conventional systems and may thus create land-use tradeoffs.
