= The 4 Percent Universe =

Book by Richard Panek

- First edition
- Author: Richard Panek
- Language: English
- Subject: Astronomy, physics
- Genre: Non-fiction
- Publisher: Houghton Mifflin Harcourt
- Publication date: January 10, 2011
- Publication place: United States
- Media type: Print, e-book
- Pages: 320 pp.
- ISBN: 0618982442

The 4 Percent Universe: Dark Matter, Dark Energy, and the Race to Discover the Rest of Reality is a nonfiction book by writer and professor Richard Panek and published by Houghton Mifflin Harcourt on January 10, 2011.

In October 2011, the Nobel Prize in Physics was awarded to Saul Perlmutter, Brian Schmidt, and Adam Riess, three of the main figures discussed in the book for the primary discovery that is the topic of The 4 Percent Universe.

== Content ==
The book's namesake comes from the scientific confusion over how ordinary matter makes up only four percent of the mass–energy in the universe, with the rest consisting of mysterious dark matter and dark energy that are both invisible and almost impossible to detect. It is due to dark matter that galaxies are able to keep their shape, with the mass of dark matter creating enough gravitational force to hold the stars that make up a galaxy together. Dark energy, however, is a substance or force responsible for the accelerating expansion of the universe over time.

The significant focus of The 4 Percent Universe is on the developments of astronomical science in the 20th century, including the formation of the expanding universe theory by Edwin Hubble in the 1930s. This model, when used in conjunction with Albert Einstein's general relativity helped in the creation of the Big Bang model and the later discovery of the cosmic background radiation in the 1960s. In following this history, Panek also discusses the flaws and missing pieces in the theories and the quest by two major scientific groups to discover the reason for the expansion of the universe not matching the models as expected. The book discusses the science behind the idea of dark matter being made up of weakly interacting massive particles and how scientists tried to determine the existence of dark energy from the 1990s and onward. The two groups involved in this research were the Supernova Cosmology Project headed by Saul Perlmutter and the High-Z Supernova Search Team headed by Brian Schmidt, both of which were involved in pioneering the use of Type Ia supernovae as standard candles for determining the variation in the universe's rate of expansion over its history, which in turn allows prediction of its future expansion.

== Style ==
Salon's Laura Miller described Panek and his writing style as a "wondrously clear explicator of some thorny concepts". Writing a review for Science News magazine, Ron Cowen commented that Panek "writes eloquently about the mind-bending search for meaning in a universe dominated by stuff no one can see", while he also "weaves together concepts from particle physics, relativity, quantum mechanics and cosmology with personal portraits of astronomers". Andrew I. Oakes wrote in The Journal of the Royal Astronomical Society of Canada that the book's "logical approach to storytelling and its clear writing style foster a very manageable and entertaining read".

== Critical reception ==
Kirkus Reviews described the book as having "vivid sketches of scientists, lucid explanations of their work and revealing descriptions of the often stormy rivalry that led to this scientific revolution, usually a media cliché, but not in this case." Choice magazine reviewer C. G. Wood rated the work as "highly recommended" and noted that while Panek "does not shortchange the science", the book mainly "concentrates on the personalities of those involved in the highly personal and sometimes bitter rivalry". The convoluted nature and number of scientists, organizations, and events involved in the book's topic is pointed out by Carl Zimmer in writing for The Washington Post, who stated that "Panek's passion for the mysteries of dark matter and dark energy wins the day" and that the premise "succeeds because he recognizes that he's writing not just about red shifts and supernovae, but about people". In a special for The Dallas Morning News, author Fred Bortz commended how Panek takes the complicated scientific nature of the book's topic and "weaves that science into a compelling narrative of a quest full of technological challenges, unexpected turns and expected human rivalries over high stakes, including perhaps a future Nobel Prize."

Jonathan L. Feng in a review for Scientific American pointed out that Panek has "a talent for elucidating difficult concepts" and that the book is "fun reading" thanks to his writing style and use of language, but notes that some spelling errors and inaccurate terminology and scientific name usage mars the otherwise perfect "significant accomplishment" that the book itself is. Samantha Nelson for The A.V. Club rated the book a C−, lamenting how Panek is able to describe scientific material in an understandable manner, but that the science is "bogged down by Panek's focus on the teams researching cosmology", finally noting that the "people behind the scientific discoveries deserve credit, but the science should still be the star of the book."

== See also ==
- Dark matter in fiction
- Exotic matter
- Mirror matter
- Negative mass
- Quintessence (physics)
- Scalar field dark matter
- Self-interacting dark matter
- Unparticle physics
- Quintessence: The Search for Missing Mass in the Universe
