= Thinking in Pictures =

1995 book by Temple Grandin

- Author: Temple Grandin
- Language: English
- Published: 1995
- Publication date: November 1995
- Publication place: United States
- English publication date: 1995
- ISBN: 9780385477925

Thinking in Pictures is a psychologically-focused autobiography written and largely edited by Temple Grandin. First published in 1995, it documents much of her life with autism. Grandin is often labeled as having "high functioning" autism; having published literary works and academic articles in addition to working as a professor and lecturer of animal science. The title, Thinking in Pictures, comes from Grandin's analogy of her method of thought processing; she states that words come as a second language to her. Though Grandin sees the world differently than most, her firm belief on being "different, but not less" and daily intent of self-preservation manifest clearly throughout her writing. Many instances in the book recount her work on cattle farms and how she sees images in her mind of prototypes of machines and edits them before building even occurs. In addition to explaining her work with cattle, Grandin incorporates information on aspects of autism like diagnostic criteria, common misconceptions, and treatment alternatives throughout her book.

== Editing ==
The first element of editing in Grandin's book is her conversion of visual thought into written words. Grandin's editor helped her navigate the organization of the story, something that Grandin found difficult as a visual thinker. Each chapter of the book presents a facet of her life experience, roughly in chronological order but often doubling back to review an earlier event or perspective and sometimes repeating itself. Oliver Sacks references her simple and straightforward style in the foreword to Thinking in Pictures, mentioning that in the period of time between Grandin's first book and her later Thinking in Pictures show growth in her writing style, from her adoption of a warmer tone to her utilization of a more complete narration of context in consideration of the general reader. The simplicity and clarity of her writing reflects part of her different perspective on thought. While Grandin does mention that her editor has helped her with organization, her book still reflects her own structure of thought. This structure might not be intuitive to every reader, especially those who do not experience thought the same way that Grandin does. Not everyone on the autism spectrum experiences visual thinking, since individuals on the autism spectrum experience a range of neurological patterns, specializations, and deficits.

Grandin has also edited her book for updates in research and resources over time. The 2005 expanded edition of Thinking in Pictures includes the unchanged original text as well as additional sections within chapters designated by "Update" with the updated section header following. These sections include additional insights or new information that Grandin has encountered. She also added new resources and websites in the back of the book that might be useful to the reader.

== Expanded edition ==
In 2005, Grandin began revising the initial publication of Thinking in Pictures, posting an update of the first chapter to her website. In 2006, a revised edition of Thinking in Pictures, Expanded Edition was published. This revised edition includes a collection of new, updated, and corrected research in addition to additional personal narrative which connecting the supplementary research and Grandin's experience with autism to existing chapters.

== Visual thinking applications ==
Grandin recounts various instances in which she was reminded that her way of thinking does not quite mesh with that of the average ranch hands she would work with. Grandin brings up early in the book, a situation in which cattle were afraid to step into a pool for cleaning. Because of this, Grandin thought of a ramp for cattle to walk down and into the pool, that would prevent panic from setting in by implementing a slight incline. Grandin edited the design in her mind. The ranch hands could not understand what she was doing or how, and Grandin was once again reminded that other people do not think in the same way that she does and that she understands the minds of cattle more than those of her human counterparts. She designed and built the ramp in her head, then came the physical piece. The ramp was just metal, and the ranch hands believed that the ramp would be too slick and cattle would not get their footing. They covered the ramp in rubber, which led to multiple cattle falling into the pool in a panic, and drowning. Grandin was furious and ordered the rubber to be removed, which led to the ramp working perfectly.

== Relating to cattle ==
Grandin found it much easier to not only relate to cattle, but to really get into their minds and understand them more than other people. Her book Animals in Translation examines how her life with autism allows her to understand animals in a way that most others cannot. Even though Grandin finds it difficult to relate to other people, she understands that it is necessary and helpful in many cases. Grandin admits to people that she cannot quite understand them unless they are very straightforward and speak what they mean.

== The squeeze machine ==
The 'squeeze machine', also known as the 'hug box', 'Hug machine', or 'squeeze box', was originally used by farm handlers to calm livestock while they were being examined. Temple Grandin saw the calming effect it had on the animals and used it on herself since she desperately wanted the calming effect the machine gave from the pressure. Grandin came up with her own design to help with her anxiety flare-ups. The basic make up of the machine is set up so the user sits at the base of a "V" shape that has padded sides and a lever that lets the user control the pressure applied and how long they want that pressure. Today, the system is used on both children and adults. There was even a test conducted in 1995 by The Center for the Study of Autism along with Willamette University in Salem, Oregon that proved that the 'squeeze machine' had a calming effect on children with autism. There have also been other studies that have shown that even children with the highest anxiety levels have calmed down after using the 'squeeze machine'.

== Reception ==
Grandin's work is noted for its insight into the minds of individuals with autism, and it is cited by one reviewer as “a welcome contrast from other books about autism” because of its focus on the strengths that people with autism have. Another review also notes that Grandin being able to put herself in the place of cattle as she designs slaughter-houses is intriguing to readers, with a few other reviews citing this ability as an area of interest as well. Another review mentions that those interested in Oliver Sacks's work will enjoy reading Grandin's work because of the realness of the subject. Oliver Sacks states in the foreword for Thinking in Pictures that the book is "a study of identity, the ‘who-ness’ no less than the 'whatness' of a most gifted autistic person."
