= Bluffton, Georgia =

- Town
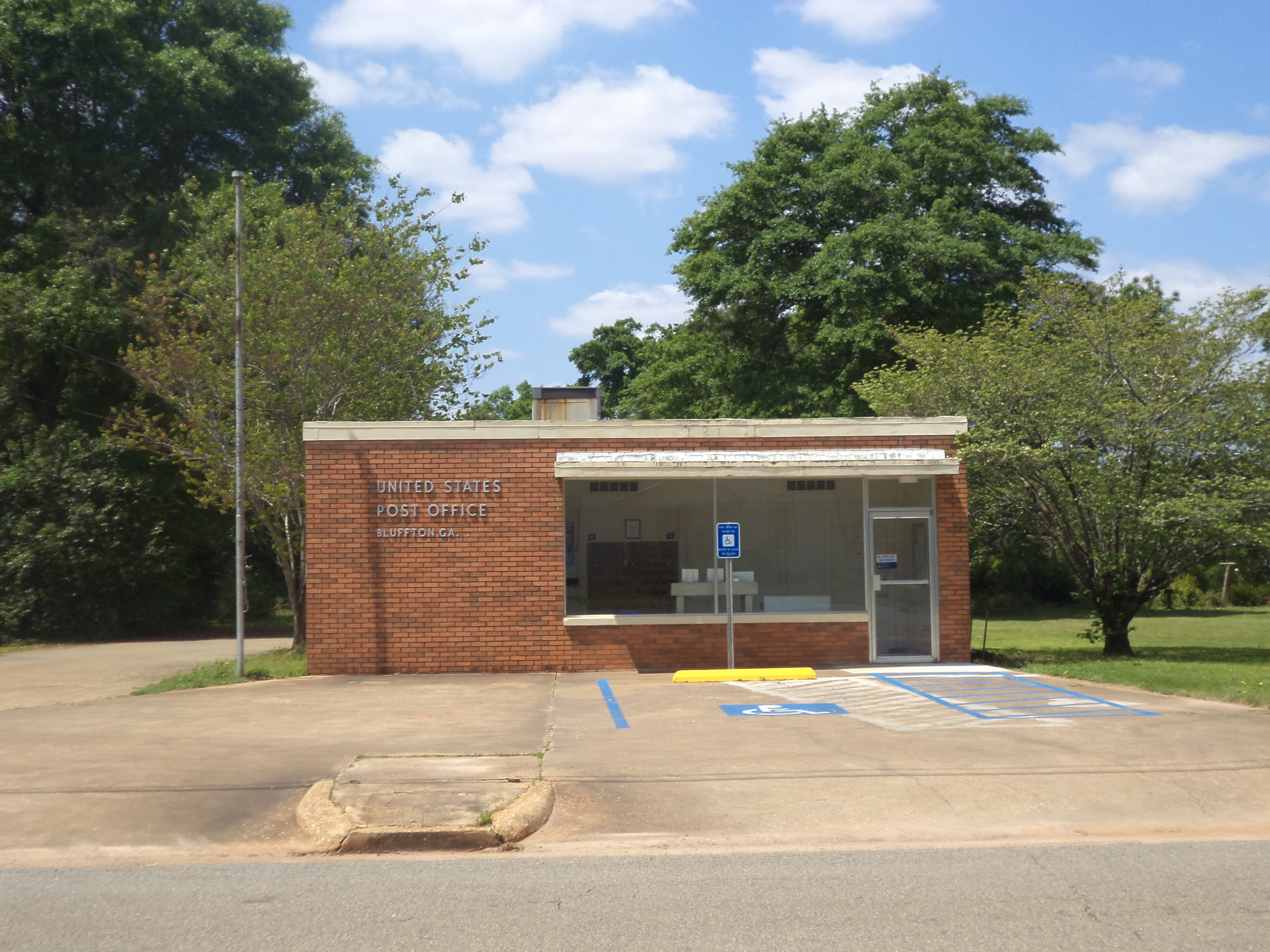
- Post office

- Location in Clay County and the state of Georgia
- Coordinates: 31°31′20″N 84°52′1″W
- Country: United States
- State: Georgia
- County: Clay

Government
  - Type: City commission government
  - Bluffton City Council: Members: Aldene Lee; Randy Morris; Larry Toomer; Brian Sapp; Justin Wiley

Area
  - Total: 1.61 sq mi (4.16 km^{2})
  - Land: 1.61 sq mi (4.16 km^{2})
  - Water: 0 sq mi (0.00 km^{2})
- Elevation: 318 ft (97 m)

Population (2020)
  - Total: 113
  - Density: 70.3/sq mi (27.13/km^{2})
- Time zone: UTC-5 (Eastern (EST))
  - Summer (DST): UTC-4 (EDT)
- ZIP codes: 31724, 39824
- Area code: 229
- FIPS code: 13-08956
- GNIS feature ID: 0311579

Bluffton is a town in Clay County, Georgia, United States. As of the 2020 census, the city had a population of 113.

== History ==
=== The Georgian Revolt ===
The Royal Colony of Georgia was founded by adventurer, general, and philanthropist James Oglethorpe in 1732. In forming the Colony of Georgia, Oglethorpe set Georgia on an unusual path. He strove to make Georgia a safe haven for petty crime offenders. He cultivated a strong relationship with the local native tribes. During the 18th century, under Oglethorpe's leadership, Georgia was one of the few colonies to expressively outlaw slavery. But the governing body, The Georgia Trustees, which were formed by Oglethorpe himself, began to chip away at his progressive agenda. When the prohibition of slavery was abolished in 1750, many of Oglethorpe's followers emigrated to Western territory controlled by the Creek and Cherokee. This territory is formally known as Clay County.

Articles of Constitutional Sovereignty In 1779, two Oglethorpians and leaders of the small town of Bluffton, Jonathon Jones and Sam Whitfields drafted the Articles of Constitutional Sovereignty as a response to rising federalism. The Articles of Constitutional Sovereignty requested to include language in the state constitution that ensured what they viewed as proportional representation for small municipalities and self governing rights. They sent their document to the state legislature of Georgia.

==== Native Allies ====
After Clay County's initial proposal was rejected by the state legislature, local leaders approached their local faction on the Creek Confederacy, known as the Coweta, about drafting a joint letter of grievances. The Treaty of Augusta in 1773 forced the native Cherokee and Creek to cede almost 2 million acres of land east of the Appalachians to the royal colony of Georgia. This also led to a strong connection between the Natives and the small townships on the western face of the Georgian and South Carolinian Appalachians, including Bluffton. The Coweta, who had not secured any territory rights from the Treaty of Augusta, sent a delegation to meet with the newly formed, self named “Constitutional Committee of Georgia” (leaders of several towns in the Clay County).

==== Official Denial to the Articles of Constitutional Sovereignty ====
They drafted 2 documents: A Statement of Grievances to the Governor of Georgia Standard for Anglo-Creek Confederacy (The latter originally titled The Treatise of Bluffton was changed 1792 as part of the Treaty of Chattahoochee that brought most of the Creek confederacy into the fold of the Georgian Revolt) They sent their letter of grievances to the governor of Georgia, Edward Telfair, who had been sympathetic to the land rights of the Creek during the Cherokee-American Wars. They also sent a letter requesting language to be included by the Constitutional Convention of 1798 (the 3rd constitutional convention). However, Telfair was voted out in 1793 and replaced by George Mathews, who represented the pro-slavery plantation owners and was far less sympathetic to the rights of the Creek. And The Articles of Constitutional Sovereignty were officially rejected by a strong Federalist majority, elected in 1794. (It is likely they did not take the petition seriously, taking measures to cement Federalist control).

==== The Document of Administration for Clay County ====
As a consequence of the official denial to The Articles of Constitutional Sovereignty the representatives of Clay County and the Coweta met again in The 2nd Anglo-Creek Convention (strangely there was no original “Anglo-Creek Convention”) in Bluffton. There were delegates from six towns and eight Creek tribes. They drafted the Document of Administration for Clay County which had seven key points: A loose confederation between the towns and tribes was to be set up. Each town would pay a small tax to fund a well organized militia of citizen soldiers and Creek warriors. The Creek would remain largely independent, but were recognized as citizens of the Clay County state. The convention drafted a detailed economic plan which would bring the towns closer together, integrate the economic potential of the Creek, and hopefully move the confederation towards economic independence The agreement would lay out a plan to disband the military within a decade一never foreseeing a conflict playing out with the state or federal government. Initially would lay out a plan by which the Anglo-Creek Confederacy would send representatives to the state legislature. Would organize a local institution to send letters to surrounding towns to promote support for a restructuring of government at the 1798 Constitutional Convention.

It is revealing that no document was drafted specifying the confederation's status. It is likely that they saw themselves as a prototype for how townships could function in the United States. Many organizers of the confederacy believed in strong state and federal governments, but thought that townships could and should maintain some political and (importantly) ideological sovereignty.

==== The Yazoo Act and the 3rd Anglo-Creek Convention ====
Initially, the actions of the towns and tribes of Clay County were overshadowed by another set of events in Western Georgia. Governor George Mathews, egged on by his base of land speculators and plantation owners, who each wanted a piece of the Western-pie, signed The Yazoo Land Act in 1795. The Yazoo Act authorized the sale of nearly 35 million acres of Creek and Cherokee land in Western Georgia for $500,000. The four major companies who were to buy land would then be able to deal with the Creeks and Cherokee in the area and open it up to settlement. The deal faced significant push back from the people of Georgia as well as many Jeffersonian politicians fueled by the Federalist-Jeffersonian rivalry that had spread across the country in the late 1700s. In the wake of what the people of Clay County saw as aggressive and illegal government overreach, as well as a potential threat to their own liberty, the growing confederacy of native tribes and Georgian townships met again in Bluffton in 1795 to consider their response to the Yazoo Act. For the first time in its brief history, a divide formed among the representatives who met in Bluffton. Surprisingly and luckily for the young confederacy, the divide was not based on ethnicity, but instead by geography. The Eastern tribes and townships, closer to the threat of aggressive Georgian settlers, favored formally declaring independence and writing a constitution to affirm the confederacy's liberty, while the original signers of The Articles of Constitutional Sovereignty saw the danger of catching the negative attention of the state government. After 2 weeks of debate, as a compromise, the convention passed three amendments to their previous governing document. The first named the confederacy as the District of Clay County (DCC). This definition was an attempt to confine themselves to remain members of the state of Georgia and limit unwanted attention from the legislature. The second more specifically laid out the governing structure of the DCC. Third, and most controversial, the so-called, “Territorial Doctrine” set the boundaries of the DCC and laid out the procedure by which new townships could be added.

==== Territorial Expansion ====
With their agreement on paper, many of the founding officials from Bluffton realized that their county was no longer just a liberally independent territory. Their experiment now had official boundaries, and they would have to figure out how to govern their land. But, as Jones and Whitefield scrambled to keep the confederacy under control, the towns on the Eastern boundary of the DCC began sending delegations to the small settlements now within the DCC, many of whom were willing participants (as was by the design of the writers of the 3rd Anglo-Creek amendments). But, when the town of Morgan refused to be absorbed into the DCC, the confederate government scrambled to deal with what was potentially their first military encounter. An emergency meeting of the Bluffton town council was called on May 5, 1795, and a messenger was sent to the border to request any military action against Morgan be halted. However, while the council debated, a small force from the town of Edison along with a few native warriors began an assault on Morgan. Although the self named “Constitutional Army of Georgia” met little resistance from the townsfolk, many of whom welcomed the bandits with cheers, the few official who had refused the DCC's request to join, fled to Savannah to inform the government of the insurgency in the Yazoo territory. The small DCC force collected battle-hungry stragglers [needs verification] and began to march on the Town of Leary, 7 miles outside of the boundaries drawn by the 3rd Anglo-Creek convention. The force still met little resistance save for a few confused policemen who initially refused to let the leader of the Edison force into the town hall. Meanwhile, the council was informed of the insolence of the Edison force; they scrambled to put together a segment of the Militia headed by Creek General Onetiwa to stop any further action on the part of the Edison force. The two small armies met outside of Leary on May 12, where many among the indolent band from Edison were rallying to push on the large settlement of Albany. General Onetiwa met privately with the leader of the Edison force, James Walters, who was the mayor of Edison. Onetiwa wanted the combined force to withdraw to Bluffton, but Walters refused to whereby Onetiwa resolved to camp outside of the town limits to watch Walter's force. Thus began a 2-week stand off between the 2 armies, numbering a combined 300 men.

==== The Rescinding Act ====
As the armies camped at Leary, the DCC's 1st scheduled elections came. Many representatives from the eastern border towns, who wanted succession and further expansion were elected. With the shift in power Onetiwa and Walters were withdrawn from Leary (Walters had to run to keep his mayoral seat). In the coming weeks after the new legislature convened in September 1795, the newly elected officials attempted to pass legislation that would lead to further expansion. However, Whitfield and Jones still chaired the representative body; one by one the bills were rejected. The new officials represented a young, passionate minority; the officials were highly charismatic. After weeks of growing tension, the leader of the new coalition, Thomas Bailey, managed to squeak through a bill that stationed the majority of the militia on the eastern border. 1796 brought a change in the political tide of Georgia as well. Many Democratic-Republicans were elected to the state legislature along with new governor, Jared Erwin. One of those new legislators was former governor and avid opponent of the Yazoo act, James Jackson. In February Jackson pushed through the Rescinding Act which cancelled the Yazoo Act. However, Jackson proceeded to move Georgia in the direction of native extermination from the Yazoo territory. With the legislation of Bluffton in uproar, Thomas Bailey introduced a bill to sanction the capture of Albany. Although the proposal was met with ridicule, Bailey sent a message to the military forces on the eastern border led by Generals Menewa and Oliver Herald that the bill had in fact passed, that they were to March on Albany immediately. The large force of approximately 300 Creek and Clay soldiers were eager to fight and easily defeated the small force of Georgian militia stationed at Albany. Herald and his men wanted to continue to conquer the surrounding towns of Sasser and Dawson. But, one of Menewa's lieutenants convinced him that they should wait for further orders.

==== The Declaratory Committee of Bluffton ====
The Bluffton Council was furious at Bailey's treasonous actions, but Bailey and his allies heralded the victory at Albany and tied the hands of the Bluffton legislators. In the wake of victory at Albany, the nearby town of Blakley sent a letter to the Bluffton council asking to join the DCC. They were accepted in June 1796. In July, King George III sent a personal letter to the Bluffton council offering financial assistance if the DCC declared its independence. Though many of the original writers of the Bluffton Treatise felt that this change would derail the DCC from its original [purpose]. Debate in the committee lasted 2 months. Whitfield and Jones aimed to take control of the process. Whitfield and Jones succeeded in basing the language of their declaration on The Articles of Constitutional Sovereignty, including a clause offering to rejoin the union if their requests were met. The committee also passed two governing amendments to be sent back to the towns for approval. The first clarified the chain of command among elected officials. The second established guidelines for specific bureaucratic committees to be created and elected. The DCC officially declared their succession on December 6, 1796.

==== The Battle of Albany ====
The DCC began building up their militia, each segment led by a Creek and a township General. The military council, headed jointly by Jones and Bailey, began considering an assault on Sasser, but before they could come to agreement, Jones' and Whitfield's worst nightmare came true. On January 10, 1797, the DCC's declaration reached the Governor's desk; the next day a force of approximately 500 men marched on Albany. The DCC force headed by general Onetiwa, again, met them at the Blenheim bridge. A small force of 250 mostly Creek warriors poured arrow fire on the soldiers from range, while a contingent of rifle men prevented the Georgian force from crossing the river. In only thirty minutes the Georgia lines broke; they retreated having suffered 75 casualties vs only one for the Creek. Despite the apparently dominant victory, all was not well for the DCC. The officials back in Bluffton were entirely unprepared for full-scale battle with the state; they had been waiting for British aid that had not arrived yet. Additionally, full scale legislative deadlock had set in Bluffton between those who favored full-scale war and those who didn't. Unable to organize their militia, Bailey sent a letter (it is questionable whether or not at the behest of the military council) to Menewa's forces stationed at Leary and Shellman to reinforce Onetiwa at Albany. On January 18, a beleaguered force of 600 men awoke to news of 1000 Georgian militia men marching on Albany again. Onetiwa organized his archers, while Menewa rallied his men to formation. Menewa had been instructed to retreat from the city at sign of battle; he was to meet the Georgians outside the city, while Onetiwa held the city. Even as war seemed imminent Jones and Whitfield still aimed to preserve public opinion of the DCC. Georgia's army led by general John R. Higgins was prepared for Onetiwa defense this time; he spread out his forces and overwhelmed the minuscule contingents of Menewa's forces stationed to protect each entrance. But, before Higgins’ forces could overwhelm the city, the remainder of Menewa's army attacked the Georgians from behind, drawing them away from the city. As the Georgians chased Menewa towards Leary, Onetiwa's archers escaped the city and returned to Bluffton. At the end of the day, when Higgins returned with his force they found the city silent save for the townsfolk. Despite apparent defeat the DCC's smaller force had managed to inflict another 100 casualties on the Georgians while only losing 20. The two sides were set for a long battle.

==== The Battle of Leary ====
Over the next several months, the DCC began building up their military force at Leary in preparation for an assault from the Georgians. The British had sent them money and guns. In May, the attack arrived - 5,000 men for Georgia, 3,000 for the DCC. The initial battle lasted six days in the area surrounding Leary; given the Creek's military strategy the fighting quickly descended into pseudo-guerilla warfare. Both sides suffered around 500 casualties each without much territory gained or lost. For the next five years, intermittent fighting continued on the DCC's eastern border; with aid from Britain, the DCC managed to hold off the Georgian forces, without much disruption for the DCC itself. In 1798 Jackson was elected Governor; he began to push for Georgia to sell the land including the DCC to the federal government. In 1802 he succeeded, selling the land for 1.25 million dollars.

==== The Battle of Clay and the Treaty of Fort Gaines ====
Within one month of the treaty's signing, Jefferson sent a regiment of 10,000 men. When they arrived in Clay County, they found a beleaguered and disorganized militia, unprepared to battle such a large, well trained force. Within one day the DCC's militia withdrew from Leary to Cuthbert and Bluffton. By the summer of 1802, the DCC were forced to surrender Bluffton. Jones, Bailey and Creek leader Talof Harjo met with US generals Jamison T. Williams at Fort Gaines. With very little leverage, Bluffton's leaders along with the Creek agreed to cede all land in the Clay County area. 10,000 DCC followers were forced to emigrate to the west. For the next 50 years Bluffton and the surrounding towns remained mostly abandoned, Thus ended one of the most fascinating and unknown experiments in US history.

=== Modern Bluffton ===
A post office in Bluffton has been in operation since 1875. The town was incorporated in 1887. The White Oak Pastures organic farm is located there.

== Geography ==
Bluffton is located at 31°31′20″N 84°52′1″W (31.522201, -84.866816).

U.S. Route 27 runs north–south just east of the city as a four-lane divided highway, leading north 19 mi (31 km) to Cuthbert and south 13 mi (21 km) to Blakely.

According to the United States Census Bureau, the town has a total area of 1.6 square miles (4.1 km^{2}), all land.

== Demographics ==
Historical population
Census	Pop.	Note	%±
1880	76		—
1890	298		292.1%
1900	312		4.7%
1910	325		4.2%
1920	301		−7.4%
1930	292		−3.0%
1940	246		−15.8%
1950	244		−0.8%
1960	176		−27.9%
1970	105		−40.3%
1980	132		25.7%
1990	138		4.5%
2000	118		−14.5%
2010	103		−12.7%
2020	113		9.7%
U.S. Decennial Census; 1850-1870 1870-1880; 1890-1910 1920-1930; 1940 1950 1960; 1970 1980 1990; 2000 2010 2020

=== Racial and ethnic composition ===
Bluffton town, Georgia – Racial and ethnic composition Note: the US Census treats Hispanic/Latino as an ethnic category. This table excludes Latinos from the racial categories and assigns them to a separate category. Hispanics/Latinos may be of any race.
Race / Ethnicity (NH = Non-Hispanic)	Pop 2000	Pop 2010	Pop 2020	% 2000	% 2010	% 2020
White alone (NH)	95	83	92	80.51%	80.58%	81.42%
Black or African American alone (NH)	22	15	16	18.64%	14.56%	14.16%
Native American or Alaska Native alone (NH)	0	0	0	0.00%	0.00%	0.00%
Asian alone (NH)	0	0	0	0.00%	0.00%	0.00%
Native Hawaiian or Pacific Islander alone (NH)	0	0	0	0.00%	0.00%	0.00%
Other race alone (NH)	0	0	0	0.00%	0.00%	0.00%
Mixed race or Multiracial (NH)	0	3	2	0.00%	2.91%	1.77%
Hispanic or Latino (any race)	1	2	3	0.85%	1.94%	2.65%
Total	118	103	113	100.00%	100.00%	100.00%

=== 2010 Census ===
As of the 2010 United States census, there were 103 people living in the town. 82.5% were White, 14.6% African American and 2.9% from two or more races. 1.9% were Hispanic or Latino of any race.

As of the census of 2000, there were 118 people, 49 households, and 34 families living in the town. The population density was 73.2 inhabitants per square mile (28.3/km^{2}). There were 60 housing units at an average density of 37.2 per square mile (14.4/km^{2}). The racial makeup of the town was 80.51% White, 18.64% African American and 0.85% Pacific Islander. Hispanic or Latino of any race were 0.85% of the population.

There were 49 households, out of which 16.3% had children under the age of 18 living with them, 51.0% were married couples living together, 14.3% had a female householder with no husband present, and 30.6% were non-families. 24.5% of all households were made up of individuals, and 18.4% had someone living alone who was 65 years of age or older. The average household size was 2.41 and the average family size was 2.82.

In the town, the population was spread out, with 17.8% under the age of 18, 6.8% from 18 to 24, 16.1% from 25 to 44, 32.2% from 45 to 64, and 27.1% who were 65 years of age or older. The median age was 49 years. For every 100 females, there were 100.0 males. For every 100 females age 18 and over, there were 90.2 males.

The median income for a household in the town was $43,125, and the median income for a family was $45,000. Males had a median income of $29,500 versus $16,250 for females. The per capita income for the town was $16,550. There were 13.3% of families and 16.3% of the population living below the poverty line, including 11.1% of under eighteens and 7.7% of those over 64.

== See also ==
- Lord's Acre Movement
