= Broadcast Film Critics Association Awards 2004 =

Broadcast Film Critics Association Awards 2004 may refer to:

- 9th Critics' Choice Awards, the ninth Critics' Choice Awards ceremony that took place in 2004
- 10th Critics' Choice Awards, the tenth Critics' Choice Awards ceremony that took place in 2005 and which honored the best in film for 2004
