= Emma Bolger =

Irish actress (born 1996)

- Born: Dublin, Ireland
- Occupation: Actress
- Years active: 2002–2006
- Relatives: Sarah Bolger (sister)

Emma Bolger (born 1996) is an Irish former child actress. She first gained notability in the role of Ariel in the 2002 film In America. She later starred as title character in Heidi (2005).

== Career ==
At the age of six, in 2002, Bolger became known for her role in Jim Sheridan's autobiographical movie In America, in which she starred with her older sister Sarah. Emma, having already won a part in the film, urged the director, Jim Sheridan, to take a look at her sister. She played Ariel, daughter of poor Irish immigrants who land in New York City in the 1980s.

For her role in the film Emma was awarded a Young Artist Award for Best Performance in a Feature Film – Young Actress Age Ten or Younger. and won Iowa Film Critics Award for Best Supporting Actress. She also received nominations for Chicago Film Critics Awards for Most Promising Performer, Broadcast Film Critics Association Awards for Best Young Actor/Actress, Gold Derby Film Awards for Breakthrough Performance, Satellite Awards for Actress in a Supporting Role, Drama, and others. She was also nominated for Screen Actors Guild Award for Outstanding Performance by a Cast in a Motion Picture, with Laura Weinert writing that "Emma Bolger brings a startling freshness and lack of self-consciousness. We are continually surprised by the truth in her performance-she is never cloying, never too cute for the film's own good".

She later starred as title character in the 2005 film Heidi, based on classic children's story, alongside Max Von Sydow as Grandfather and Diana Rigg as Grandmamma. Bolger played Heidi, young orphan rejected by a cruel aunt and sent from the city to live with her grandfather in the Swiss Alps. Bolger went for an audition in London and few days later learned that she got part in the film. During the shooting of the film she was accompanied by her mother, Muriel, and a Welsh tutor. Andrea Beach in the review for Common Sense Media wrote that "Emma Bolger as Heidi is engaging and her performance is fine for someone so young". Stella Papamichael in her review for BBC called her performance "spirited".

She also had role in Colin Farrell's crime comedy Intermission.

In 2008 The Irish Times reported that Bolger, then aged 13, had "given up acting in favour of academic pursuits".

== Filmography ==
- 2002: In America
- 2003: Intermission
- 2004: Proof (TV, 4 Episodes)
- 2005: Heidi
- 2006: The Snow Prince

== Awards ==
=== Won ===
- Young Artist Award for Best Performance in a Feature Film – Young Actress Age Ten or Younger

=== Nominated ===
- Satellite Award for Best Supporting Actress - Motion Picture
- Chicago Film Critics Awards - Most Promising Performer
- 9th Critics' Choice Awards - Best Child Performance
- BFCA Critics' Choice Award for Best Young Performer
- Phoenix Film Critics Society Award for Best Performance by a Youth in a Lead or Supporting Role – Female
- 8th Golden Satellite Awards - Best Supporting Actress - Drama
- Screen Actors Guild Award for Outstanding Performance by a Cast in a Motion Picture along with Sarah Bolger, Paddy Considine, Djimon Hounsou & Samantha Morton
