= 8th Golden Satellite Awards =

2004 film and TV award ceremony

- Date: February 21, 2004

Highlights
- Best drama film: In America
- Best comedy/musical film: Lost in Translation
- Best television drama: The Shield
- Best television musical/comedy: Arrested Development
- Best director: Jim Sheridan for In America

The 8th Golden Satellite Awards, honoring the best in film and television of 2003, were presented by the International Press Academy on February 21, 2004.

== Special achievement awards ==
Mary Pickford Award (55 industry) – Arnon Milchan

Nikola Tesla Award (for his stand-out effects and 3D lens innovations) – James Cameron

Special Achievement Award (for outstanding talent) – Peter Dinklage

== Motion picture winners and nominees ==
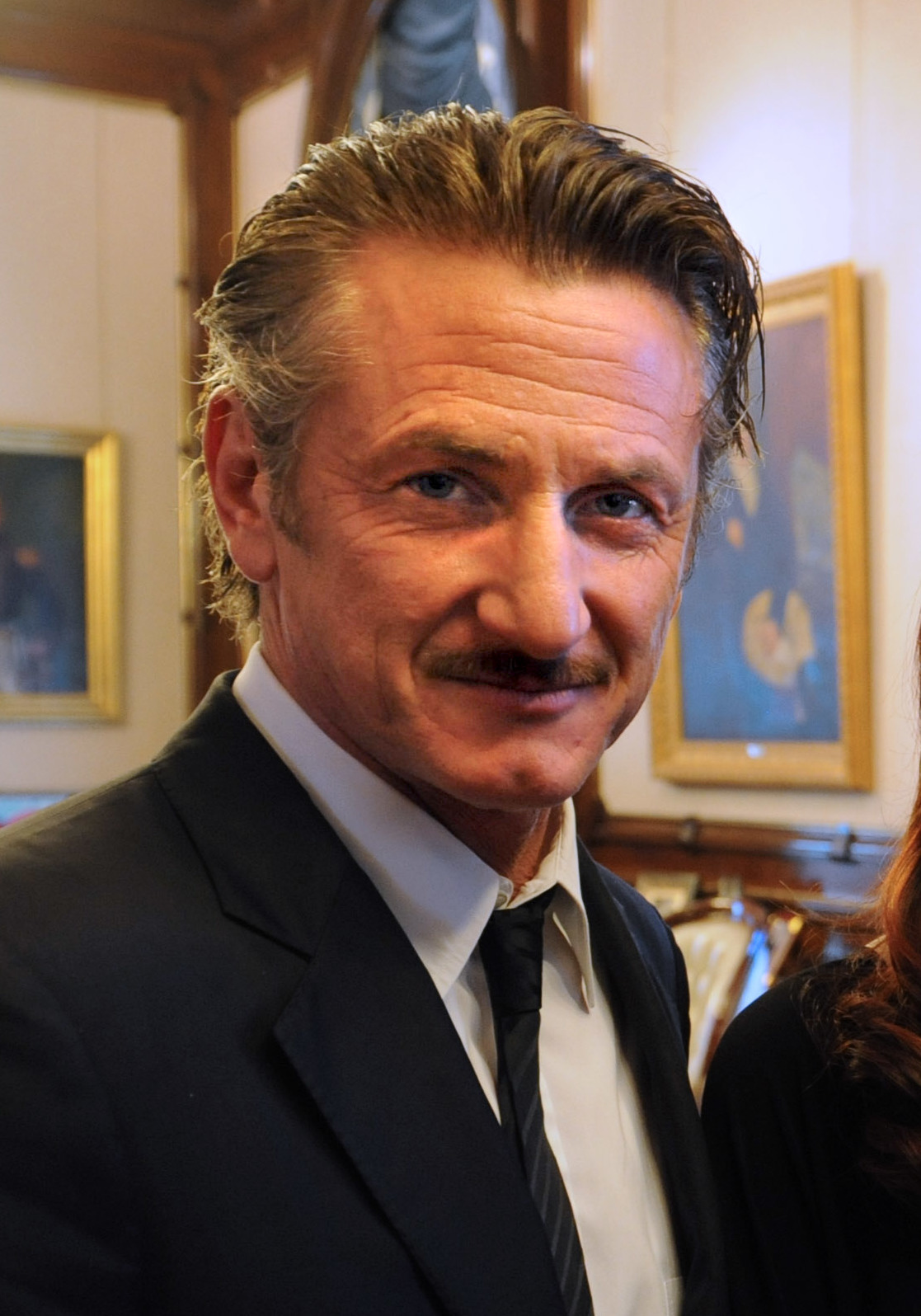
Sean Penn – Best Actor in a Motion Picture, Drama

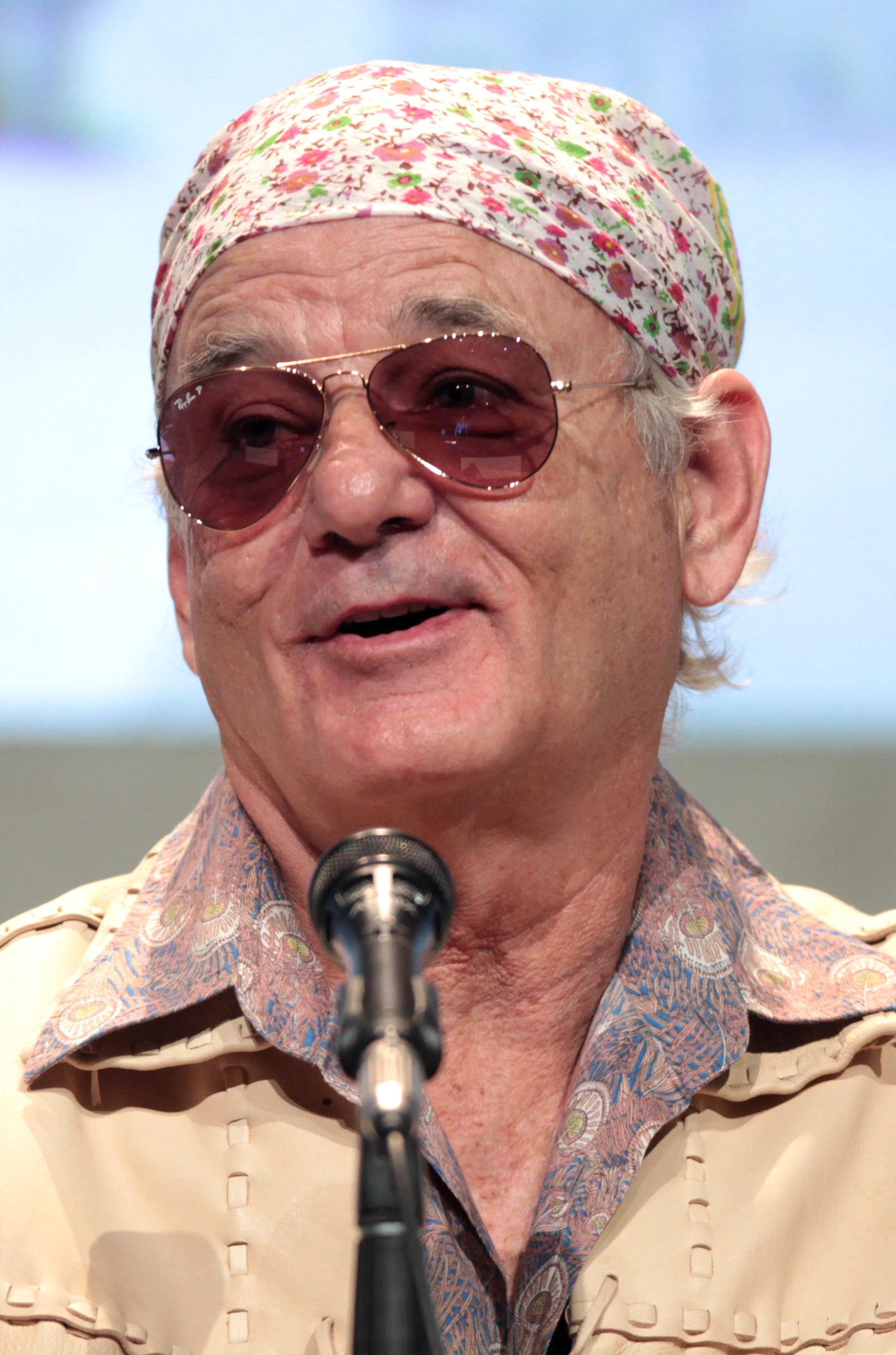
Billy Murray – Best Actor in a Motion Picture, Comedy or Musical

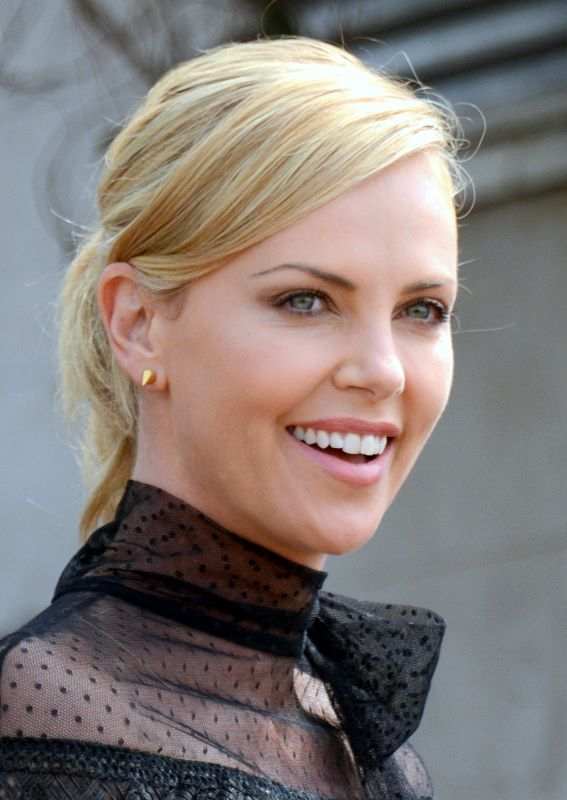
Charlize Theron – Best Actress in a Motion Picture, Drama

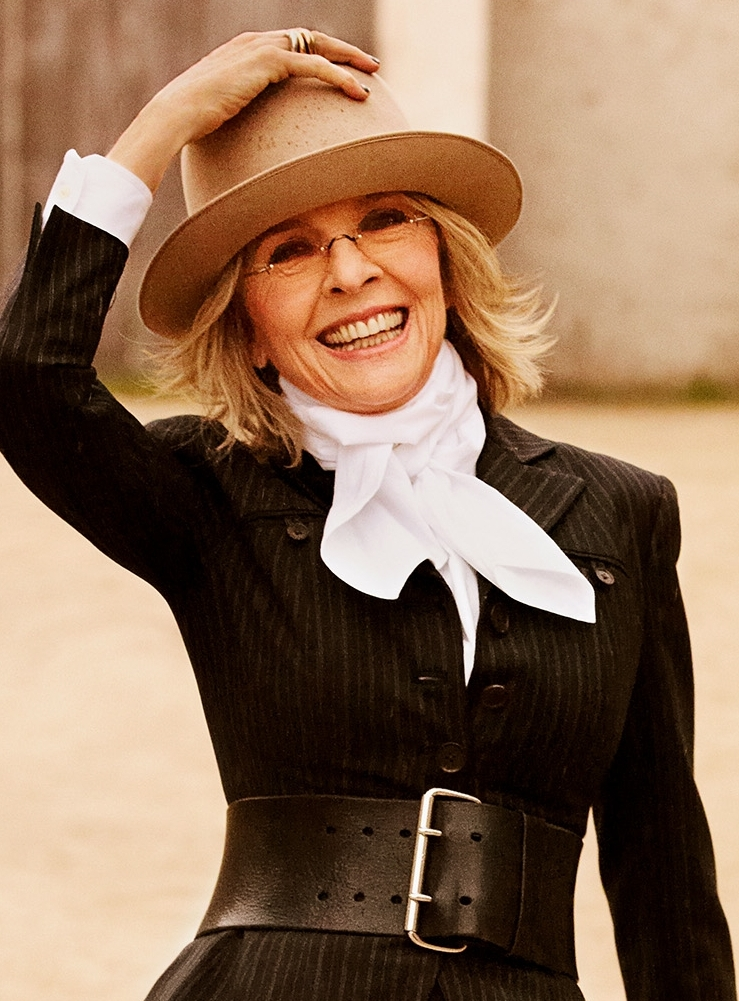
Diane Keaton – Best Actress in a Motion Picture, Comedy or Musical

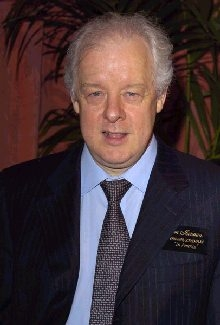
Jim Sheridan – Best Director

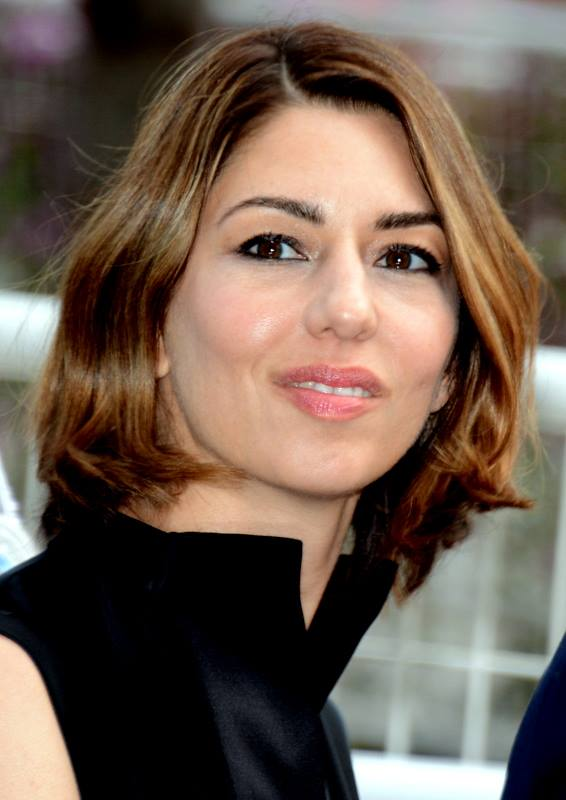
Sofia Coppola – Best Original Screenplay

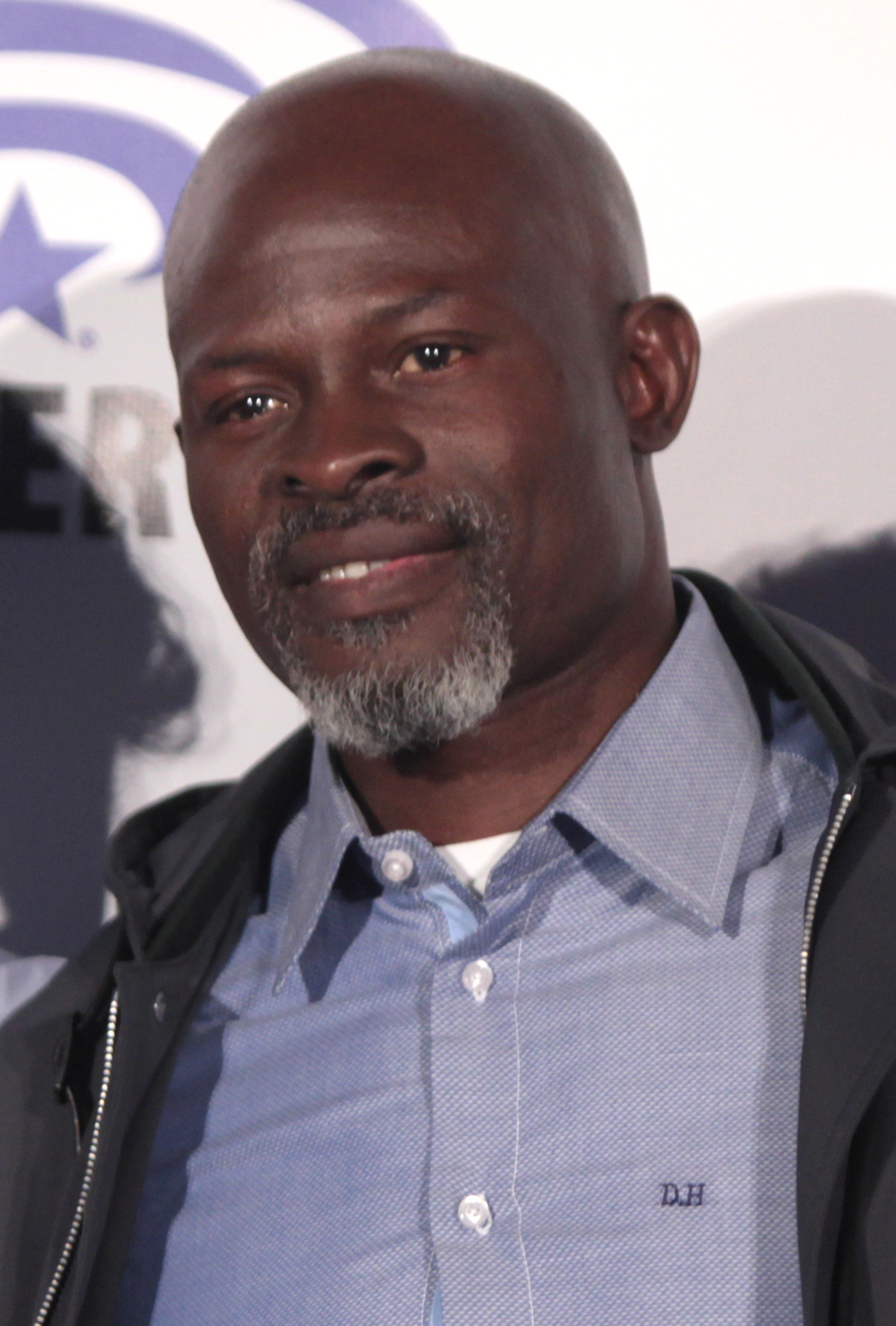
Djimon Hounsou – Best Supporting Actor in a Motion Picture, Drama

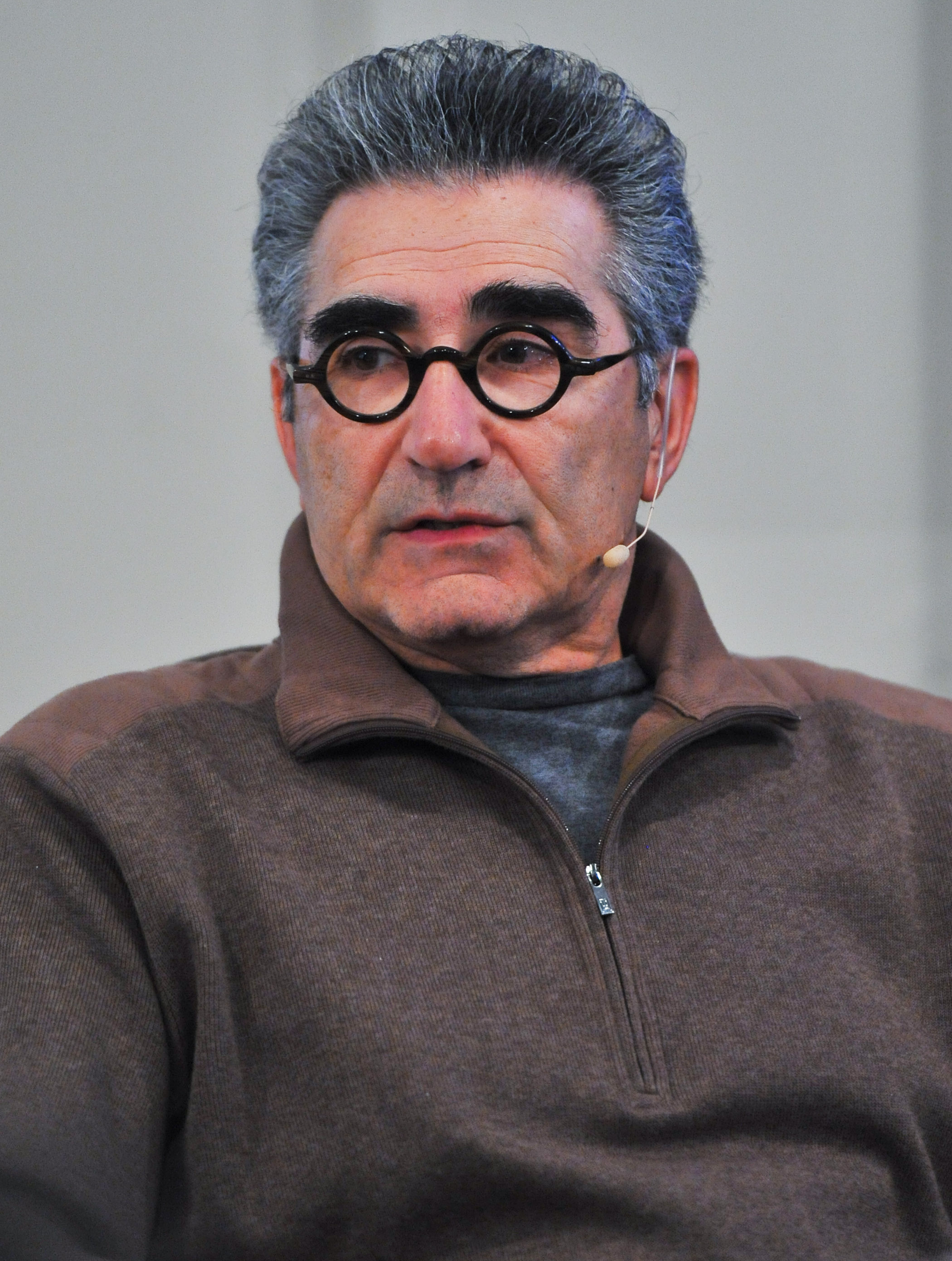
Eugene Levy – Best Supporting Actor in a Motion Picture, Comedy or Musical

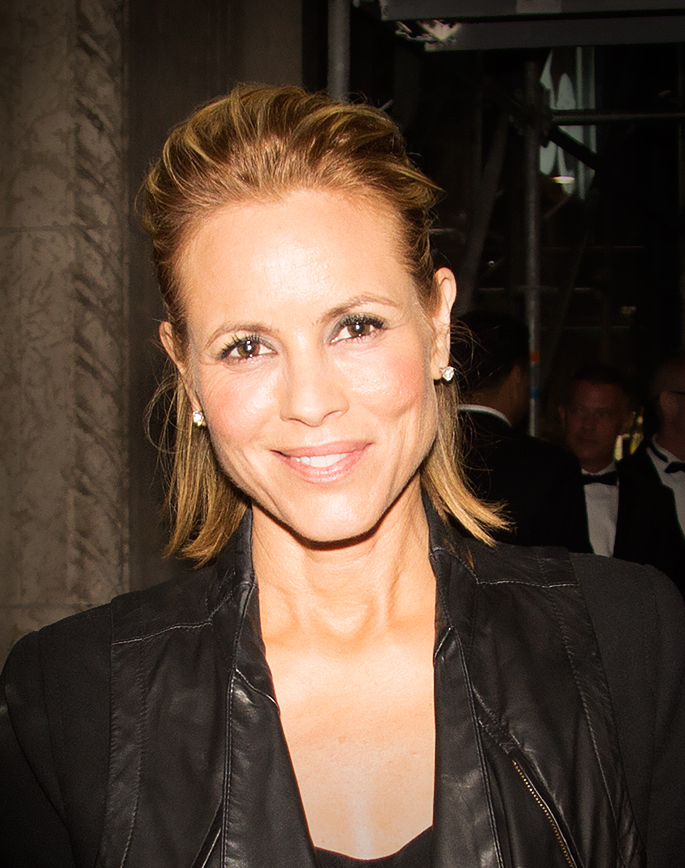
Maria Bello – Best Supporting Actress in a Motion Picture, Drama

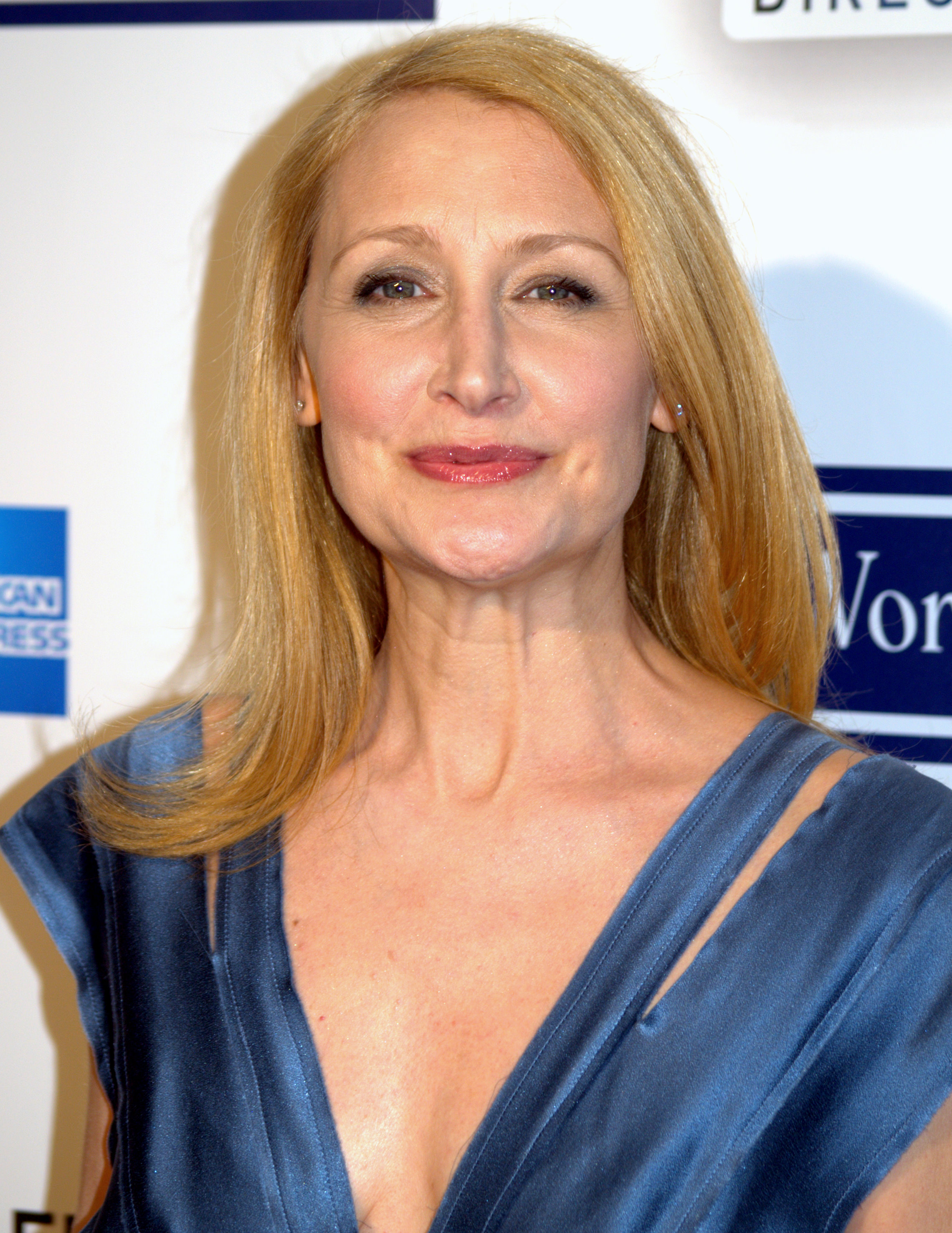
Patricia Clarkson – Best Supporting Actress in a Motion Picture, Comedy or Musical

=== Best Actor – Drama ===
Sean Penn – 21 Grams and Mystic River

- Hayden Christensen – Shattered Glass
- Paddy Considine – In America
- Tom Cruise – The Last Samurai
- Jude Law – Cold Mountain
- William H. Macy – The Cooler

=== Best Actor – Musical or Comedy ===
Bill Murray – Lost in Translation

- Jack Black – School of Rock
- Johnny Depp – Pirates of the Caribbean: The Curse of the Black Pearl
- Robert Downey Jr. – The Singing Detective
- Paul Giamatti – American Splendor
- Billy Bob Thornton – Bad Santa

=== Best Actress – Drama ===
Charlize Theron – Monster

- Jennifer Connelly – House of Sand and Fog
- Toni Collette – Japanese Story
- Samantha Morton – In America
- Nikki Reed – Thirteen
- Naomi Watts – 21 Grams
- Evan Rachel Wood – Thirteen

=== Best Actress – Musical or Comedy ===
Diane Keaton – Something's Gotta Give

- Jamie Lee Curtis – Freaky Friday
- Hope Davis – American Splendor
- Katie Holmes – Pieces of April
- Diane Lane – Under the Tuscan Sun
- Helen Mirren – Calendar Girls

=== Best Animated or Mixed Media Film ===
The Triplets of Belleville (Les triplettes de Belleville)

- Brother Bear
- Finding Nemo
- Looney Tunes: Back in Action
- Millennium Actress (Sennen joyû)
- Sinbad: Legend of the Seven Seas

=== Best Art Direction and Production Design ===
The Lord of the Rings: The Return of the King

- Kill Bill: Volume 1
- The Last Samurai
- Master and Commander: The Far Side of the World
- Seabiscuit
- Whale Rider

=== Best Cinematography ===
The Last Samurai – John Toll

- Girl with a Pearl Earring
- The Lord of the Rings: The Return of the King
- Master and Commander: The Far Side of the World
- Mystic River
- Seabiscuit

=== Best Costume Design ===
The Last Samurai – Ngila Dickson

- The Company
- The Lord of the Rings: The Return of the King
- Master and Commander: The Far Side of the World
- Pirates of the Caribbean: The Curse of the Black Pearl
- Seabiscuit

=== Best Director ===
Jim Sheridan – In America

- Shari Springer Berman and Robert Pulcini – American Splendor
- Niki Caro – Whale Rider
- Sofia Coppola – Lost in Translation
- Clint Eastwood – Mystic River
- Catherine Hardwicke – Thirteen

=== Best Documentary Film ===
Amandla!: A Revolution in Four-Part Harmony

- Capturing the Friedmans
- The Fog of War: Eleven Lessons from the Life of Robert S. McNamara
- Lost in La Mancha
- My Flesh and Blood
- Stevie

=== Best Editing ===
The Last Samurai – Victor Du Bois and Steven Rosenblum

- House of Sand and Fog
- The Lord of the Rings: The Return of the King
- Master and Commander: The Far Side of the World
- Mystic River
- Seabiscuit

=== Best Film – Drama ===
In America

- The Last Samurai
- The Lord of the Rings: The Return of the King
- Master and Commander: The Far Side of the World
- Mystic River
- Thirteen
- Whale Rider

=== Best Film – Musical or Comedy ===
Lost in Translation

- American Splendor
- Bad Santa
- Bend It Like Beckham
- A Mighty Wind
- Pirates of the Caribbean: The Curse of the Black Pearl

=== Best Foreign Language Film ===
City of God (Cidade de Deus), Brazil

- The Barbarian Invasions (Les invasions barbares), Canada
- Gloomy Sunday (Gloomy Sunday – Ein Lied von Liebe und Tod), Germany
- Monsieur Ibrahim (Monsieur Ibrahim et les fleurs du Coran), France
- Osama, Afghanistan/Iran
- Spring, Summer, Autumn, Winter... and Spring (Bom yeoreum gaeul gyeoul geurigo bom), Korea

=== Best Original Score ===
"The Last Samurai" – Hans Zimmer

- "Camp" – Stephen Trask
- "Cold Mountain" – Gabriel Yared
- "Finding Nemo" – Thomas Newman
- "The Lord of the Rings: The Return of the King" – Howard Shore
- "The Missing" – James Horner
- "Seabiscuit" – Randy Newman

=== Best Original Song ===
"Siente mi amor" – Once Upon a Time in Mexico

- "Cross the Green Mountain" – Gods and Generals
- "Great Spirits" – Brother Bear
- "The Heart of Every Girl" – Mona Lisa Smile
- "How Shall I See You Through My Tears" – Camp
- "A Kiss at the End of the Rainbow" – A Mighty Wind

=== Best Screenplay – Adapted ===
Mystic River – Brian Helgeland

- American Splendor – Shari Springer Berman and Robert Pulcini
- Cold Mountain – Anthony Minghella
- Seabiscuit – Gary Ross
- Shattered Glass – Billy Ray
- Whale Rider – Niki Caro

=== Best Screenplay – Original ===
Lost in Translation – Sofia Coppola

- 21 Grams – Guillermo Arriaga
- The Cooler – Frank Hannah and Wayne Kramer
- Kill Bill: Volume 1 – Quentin Tarantino and Uma Thurman
- The Station Agent – Tom McCarthy
- Thirteen – Catherine Hardwicke and Nikki Reed

=== Best Sound ===
Master and Commander: The Far Side of the World

- Kill Bill: Volume 1
- The Last Samurai
- The Lord of the Rings: The Return of the King
- Mystic River
- Seabiscuit

=== Best Supporting Actor – Drama ===
Djimon Hounsou – In America

- Alec Baldwin – The Cooler
- Jeff Bridges – Seabiscuit
- Benicio del Toro – 21 Grams
- Omar Sharif – Monsieur Ibrahim (Monsieur Ibrahim el les fleurs du Coran)
- Ken Watanabe – The Last Samurai

=== Best Supporting Actor – Musical or Comedy ===
Eugene Levy – A Mighty Wind

- Johnny Depp – Once Upon a Time in Mexico
- Bill Nighy – Love Actually
- Sam Rockwell – Matchstick Men
- Geoffrey Rush – Pirates of the Caribbean: The Curse of the Black Pearl
- Thomas Sangster – Love Actually

=== Best Supporting Actress – Drama ===
Maria Bello – The Cooler

- Emma Bolger – In America
- Annette Bening – Open Range
- Patricia Clarkson – The Station Agent
- Marcia Gay Harden – Mystic River
- Holly Hunter – Thirteen

=== Best Supporting Actress – Musical or Comedy ===
Patricia Clarkson – Pieces of April

- Shaheen Khan – Bend It Like Beckham
- Scarlett Johansson – Lost in Translation
- Catherine O'Hara – A Mighty Wind
- Emma Thompson – Love Actually
- Julie Walters – Calendar Girls

=== Best Visual Effects ===
Master and Commander: The Far Side of the World

- Kill Bill: Volume 1
- The Last Samurai
- The Lord of the Rings: The Return of the King
- Pirates of the Caribbean: The Curse of the Black Pearl
- Terminator 3: Rise of the Machines

== Television winners and nominees ==
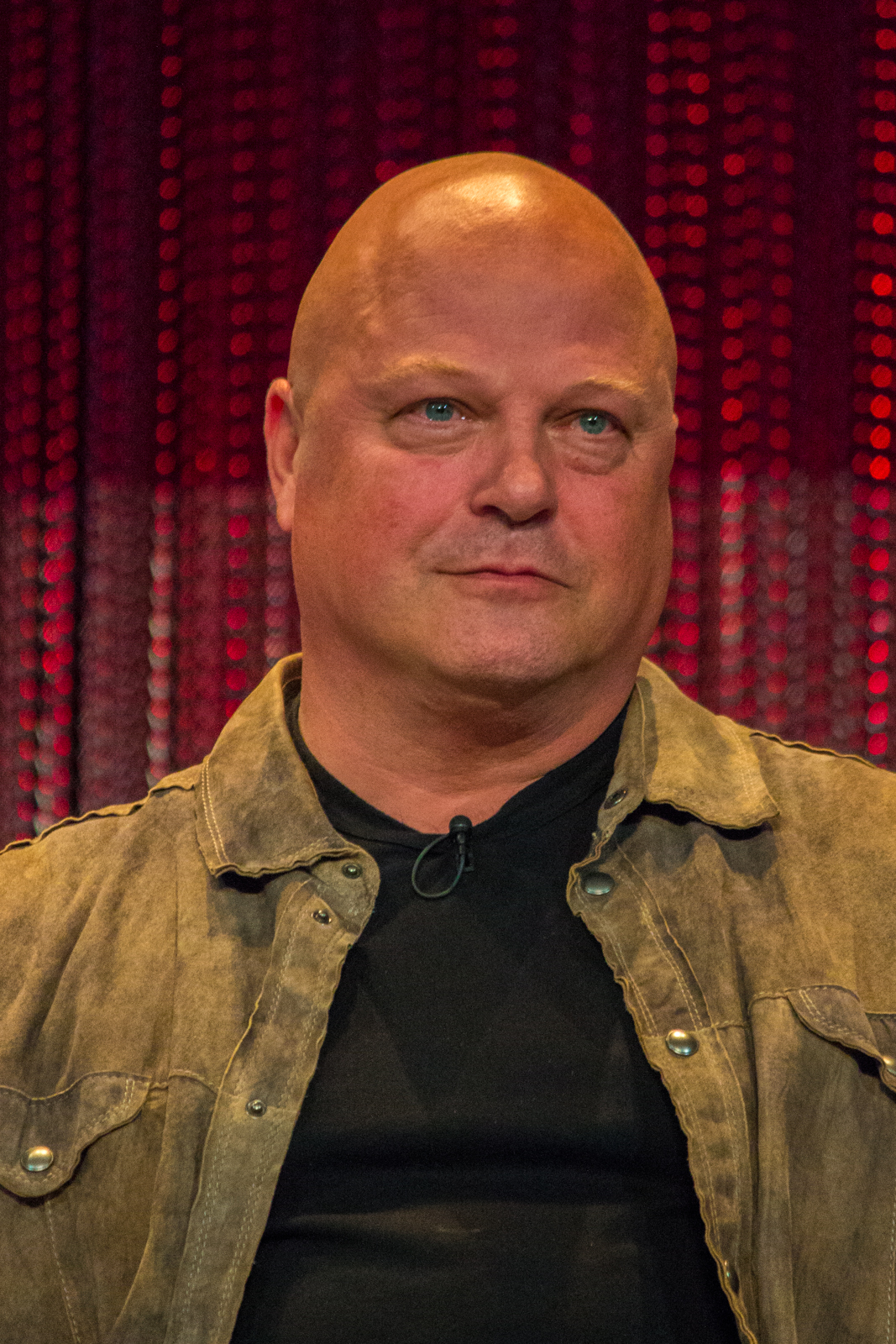
Michael Chiklis – Best Actor in a Series, Drama

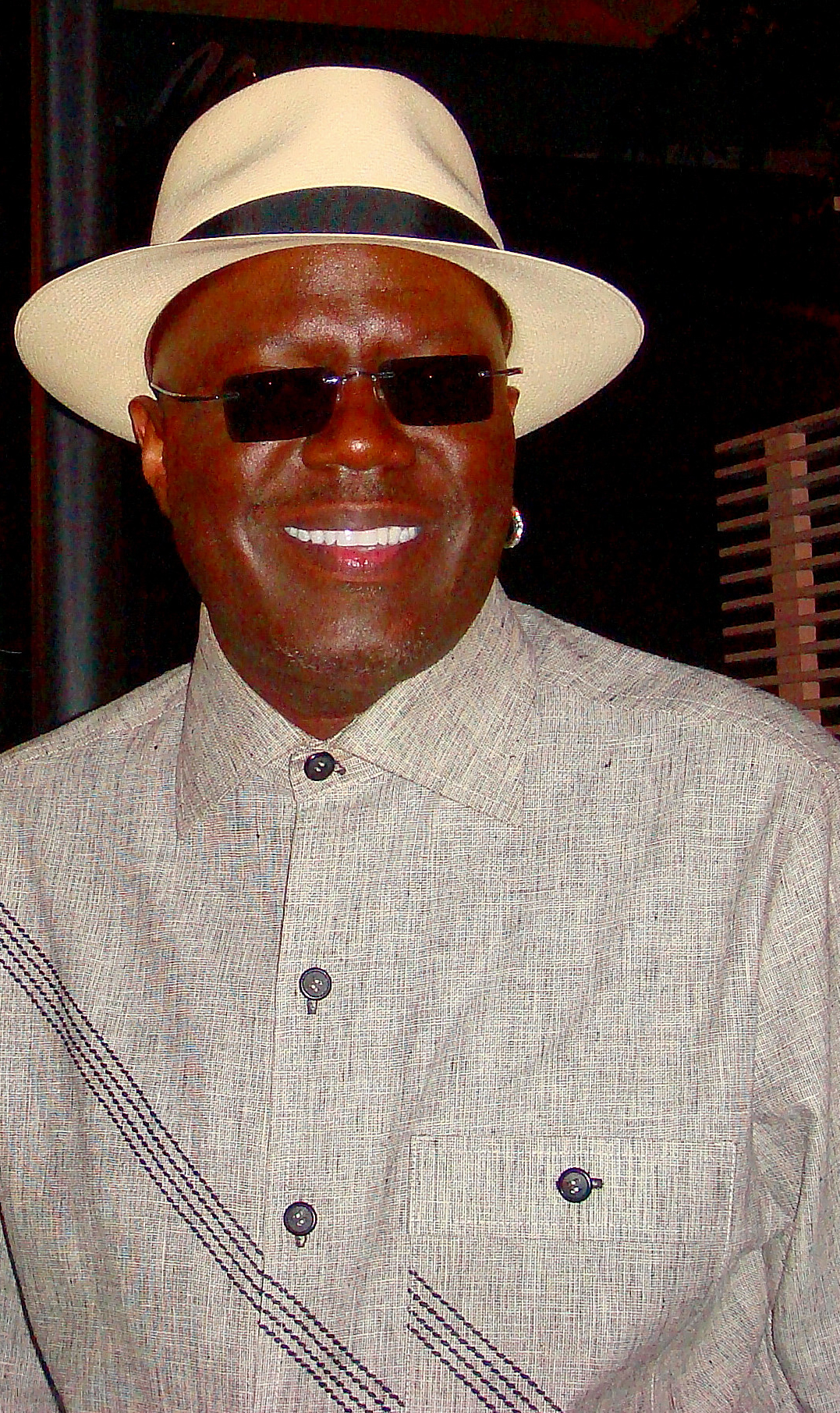
Bernie Mac – Best Actor in a Series, Comedy or Musical

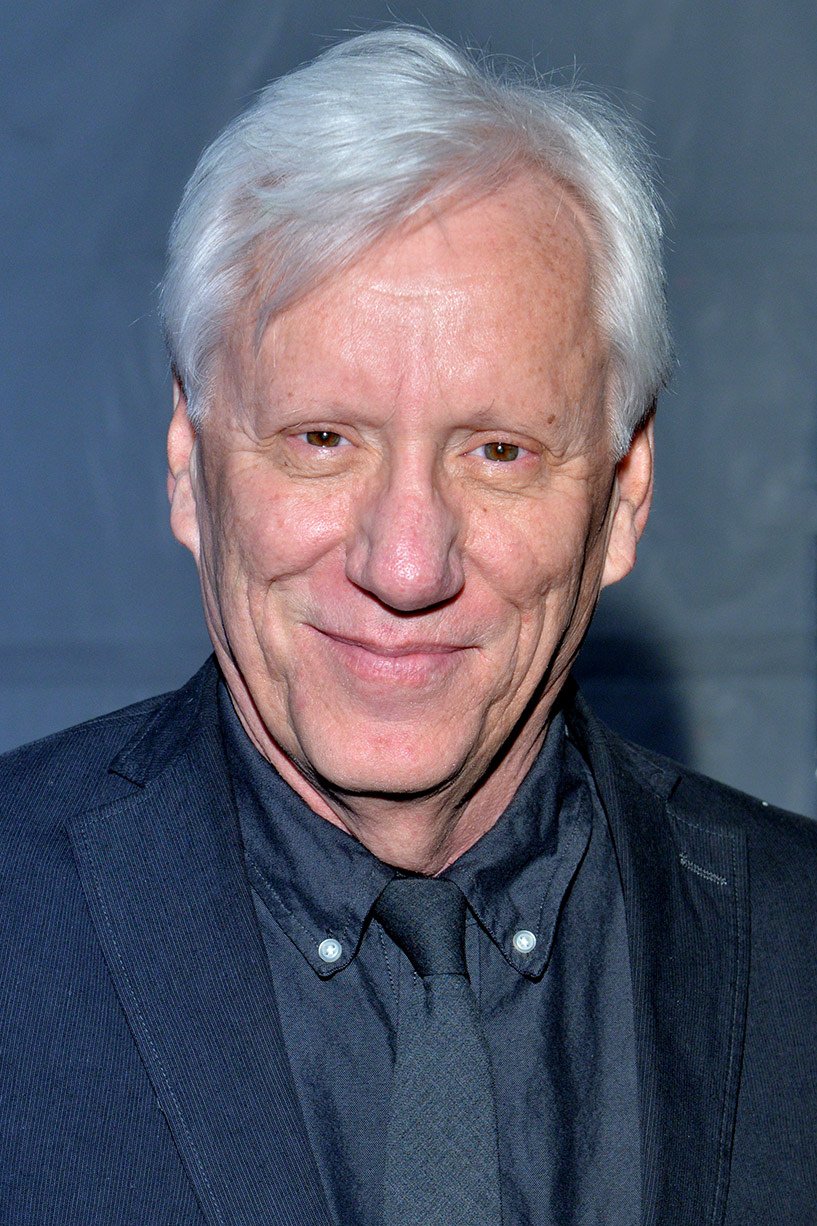
James Woods – Best Actor in a Miniseries or Television Film

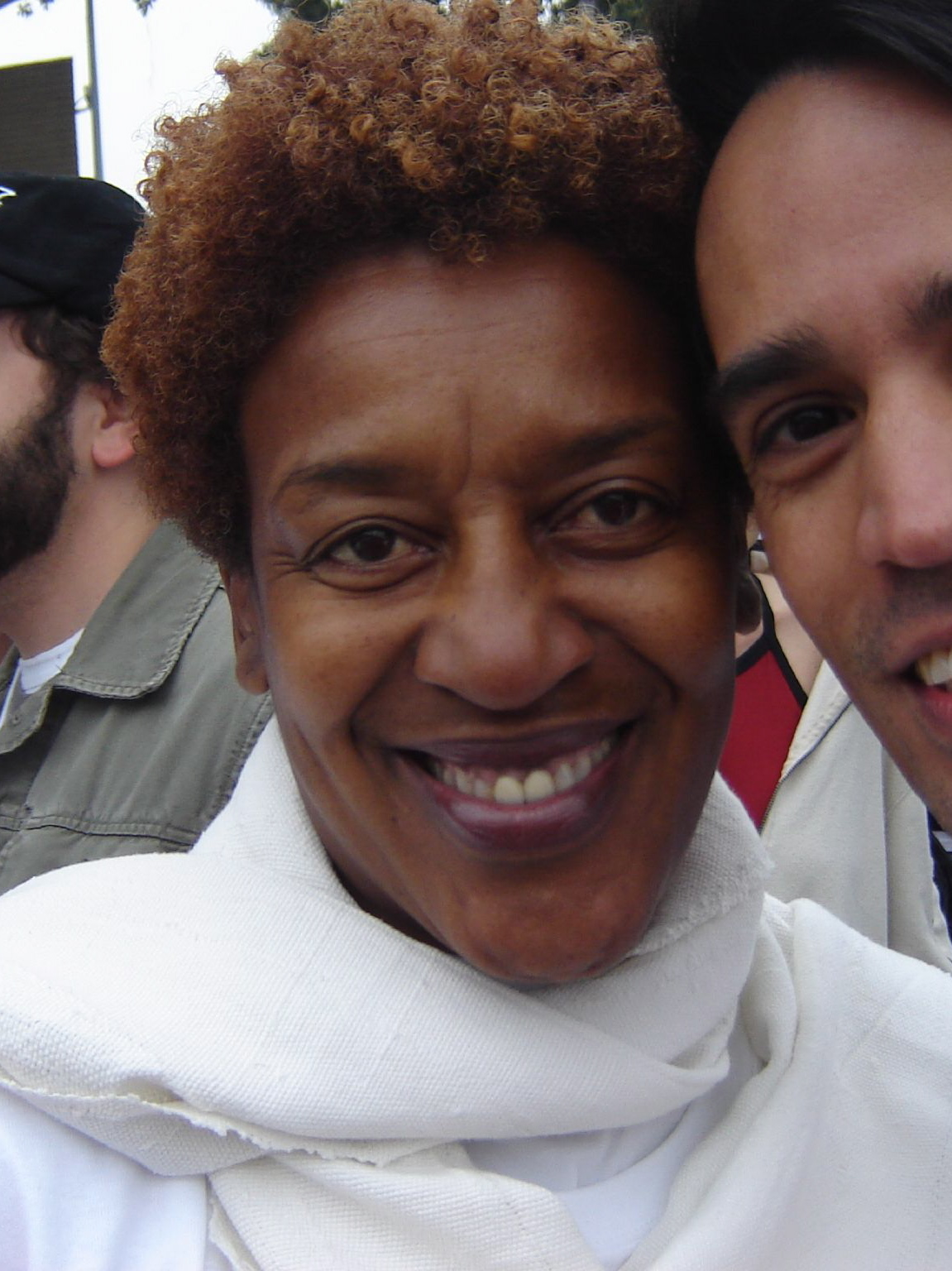
CCH Pounder – Best Actress in a Series, Drama

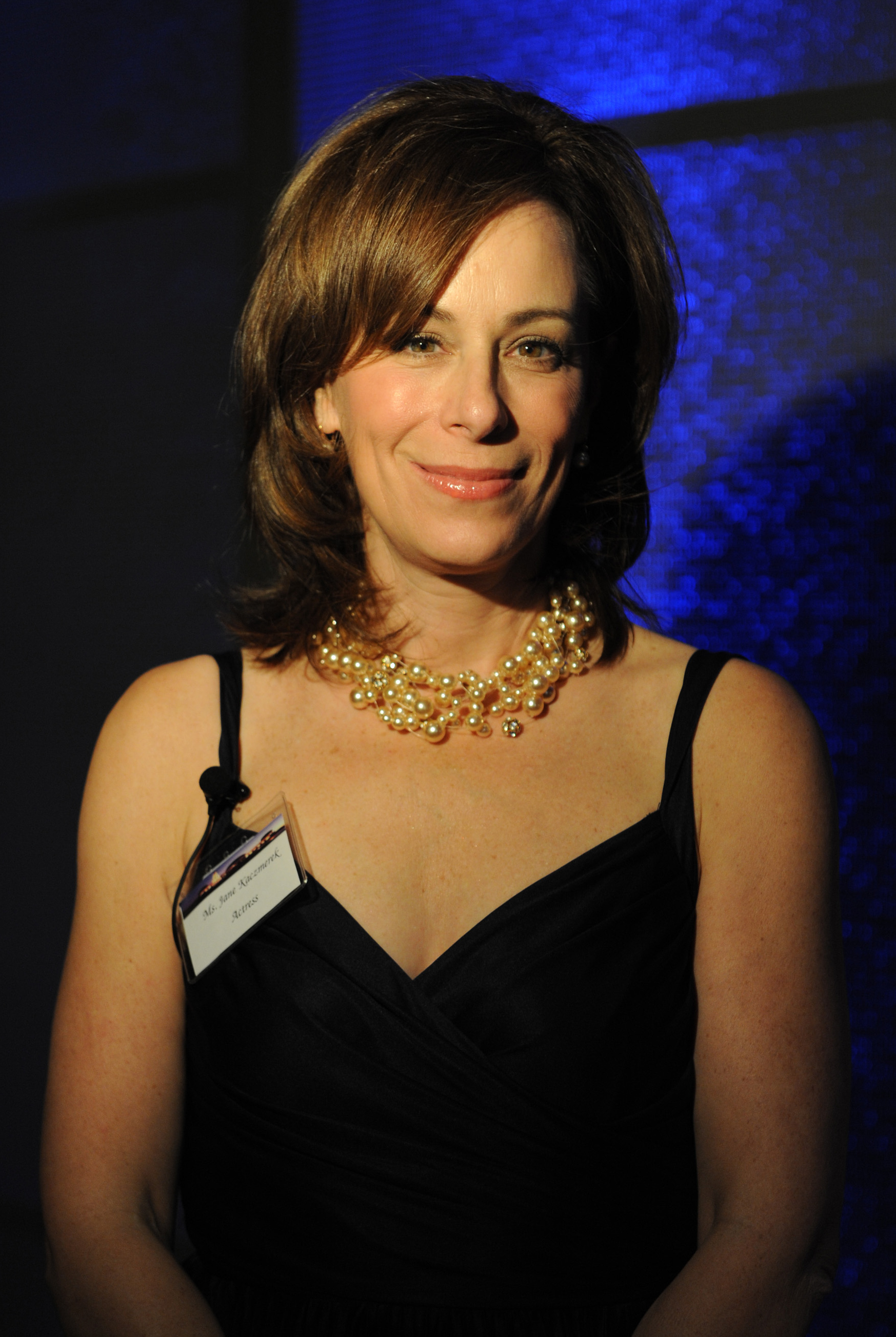
Jane Kaczmarek – Best Actress in a Series, Comedy or Musical

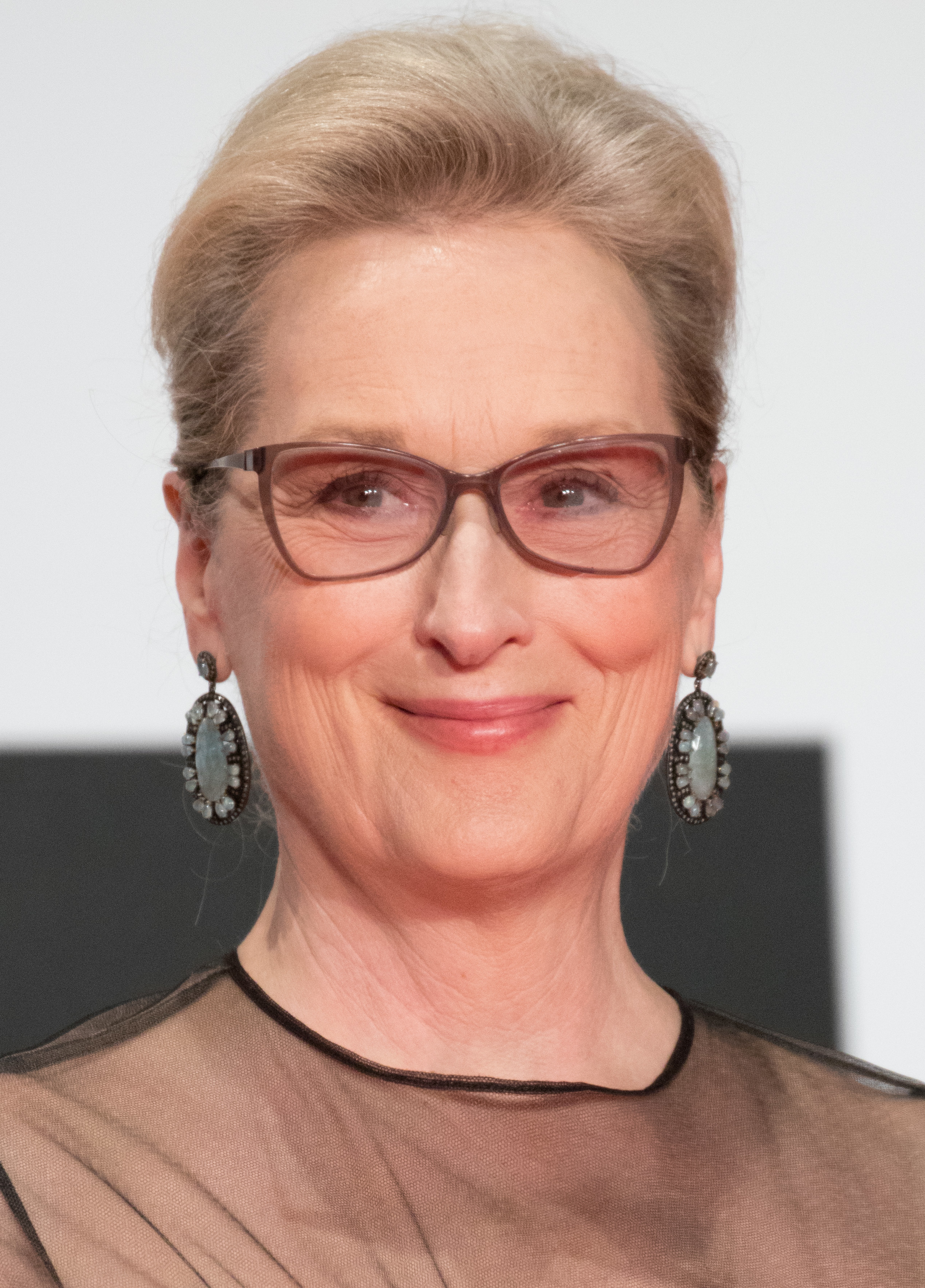
Meryl Streep – Best Actress in a Miniseries or Television Film

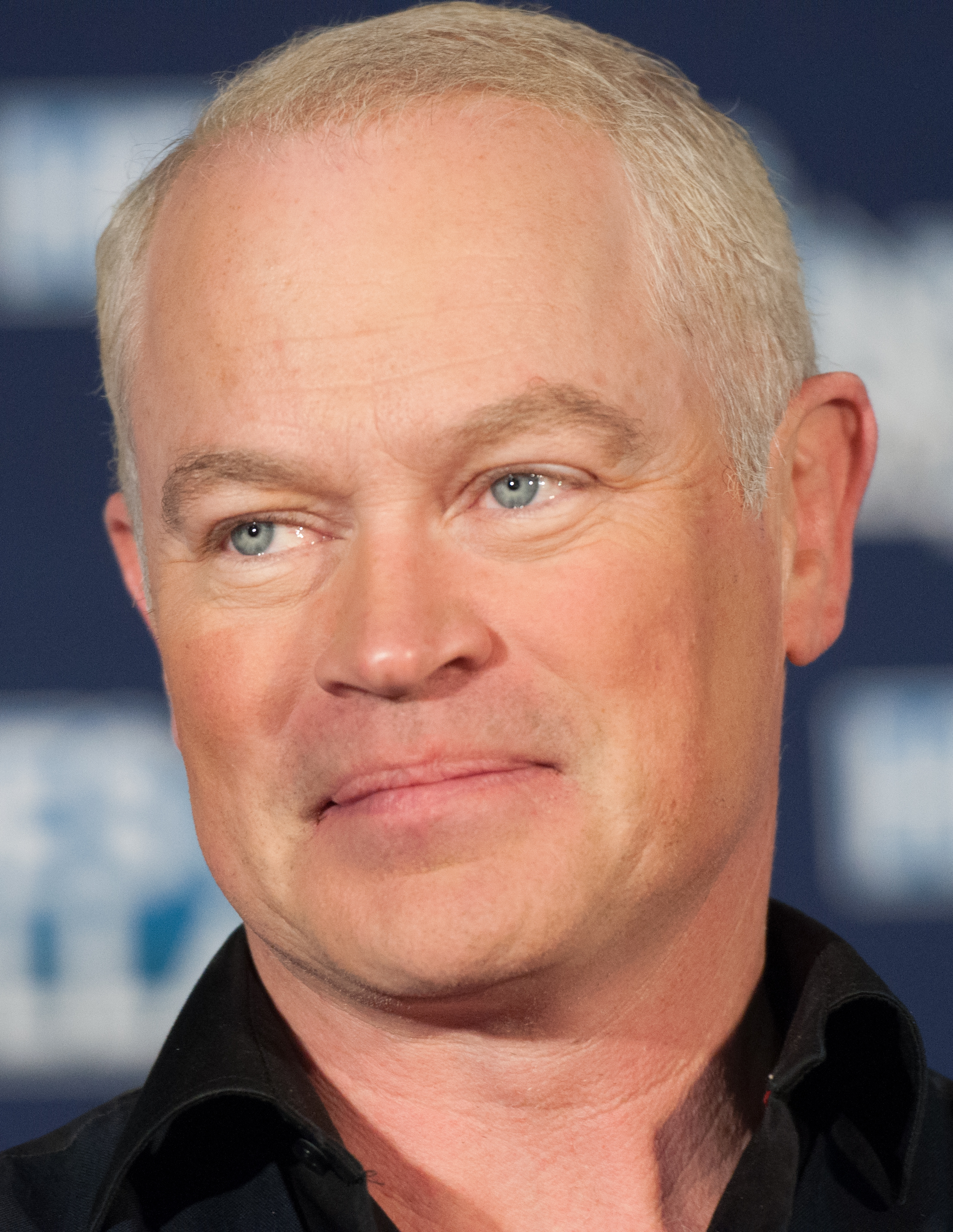
Neal McDonough – Best Supporting Actor in a Series, Drama

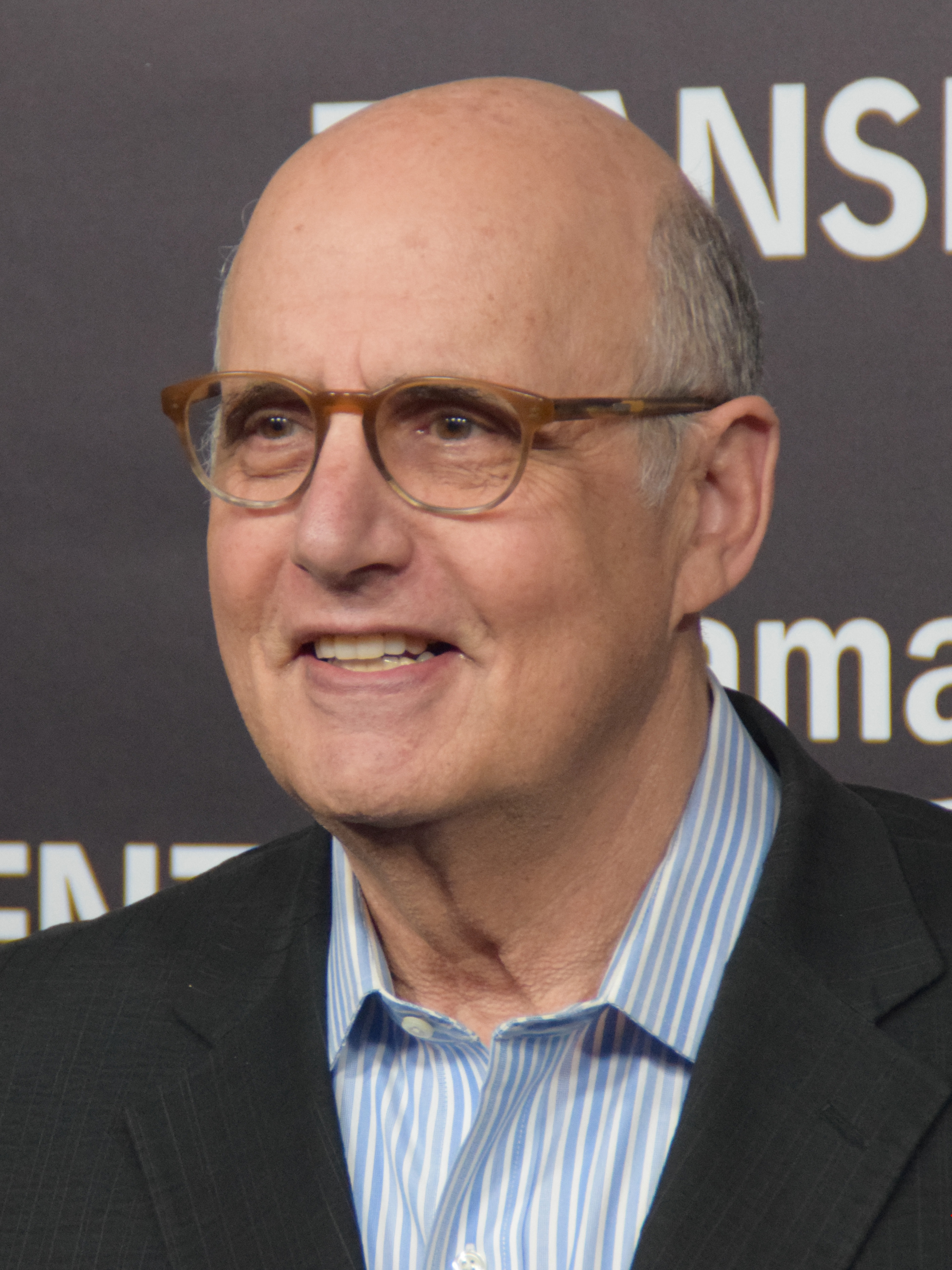
Jeffrey Tambor – Best Supporting Actor in a Series, Comedy or Musical

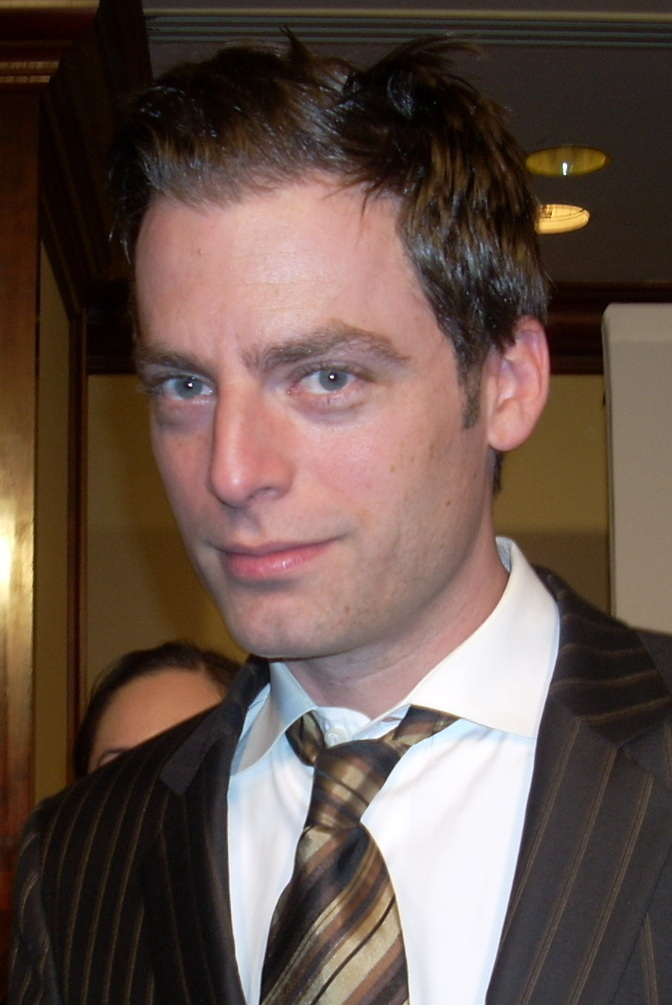
Justin Kirk – Best Supporting Actor in a Miniseries or Television Film

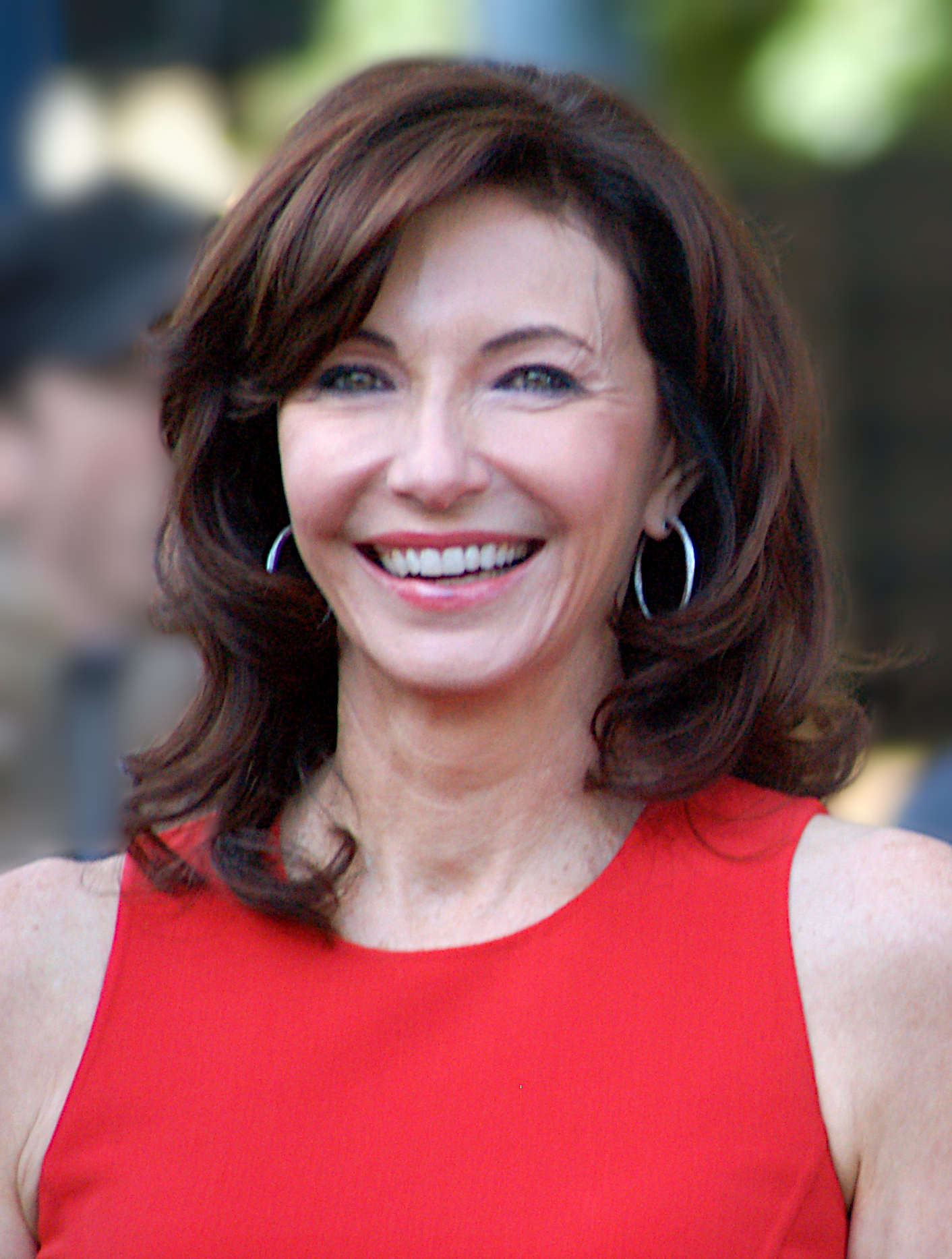
Mary Steenburgen – Best Supporting Actress in a Series, Drama

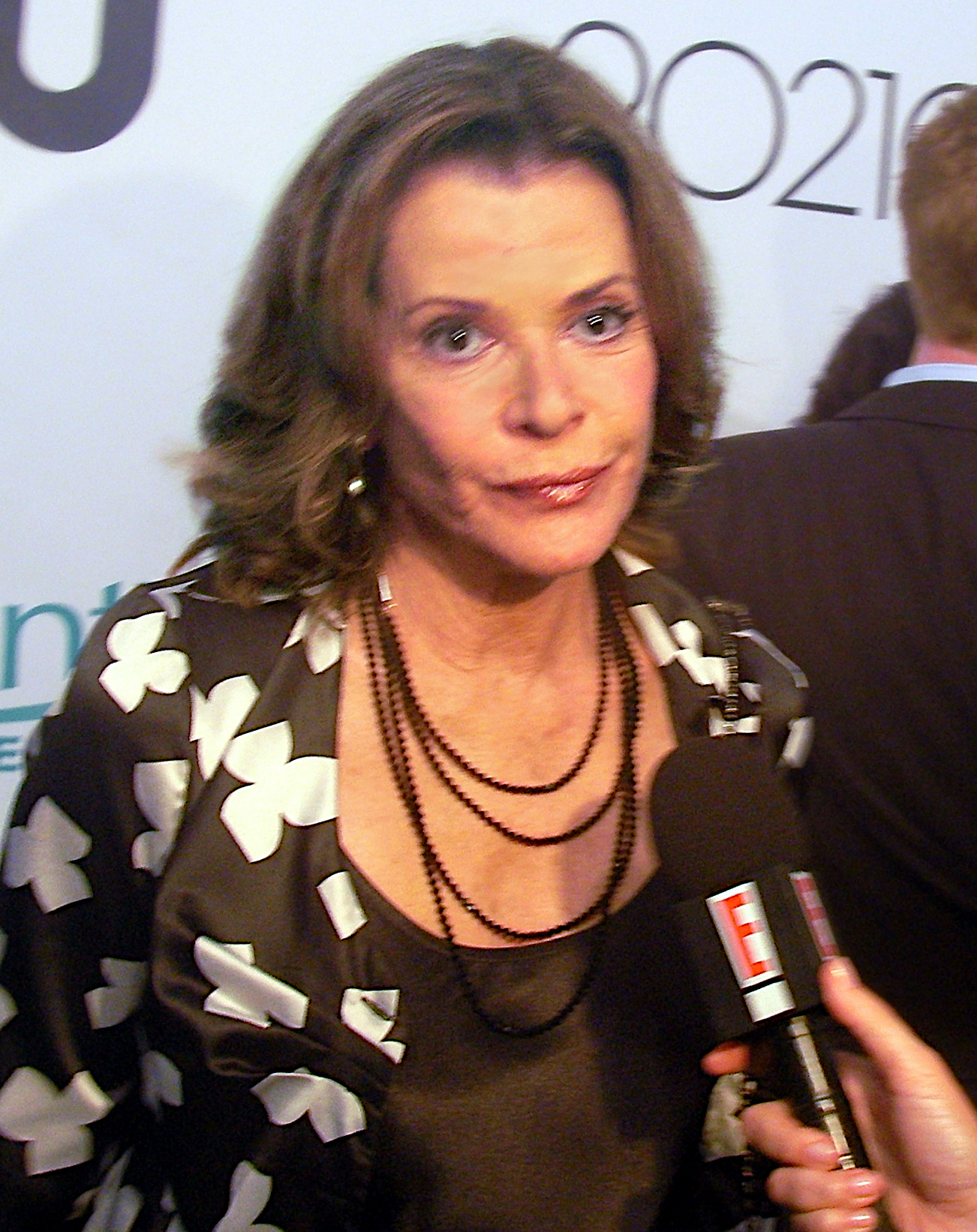
Jessica Walker – Best Supporting Actress in a Series, Comedy or Musical

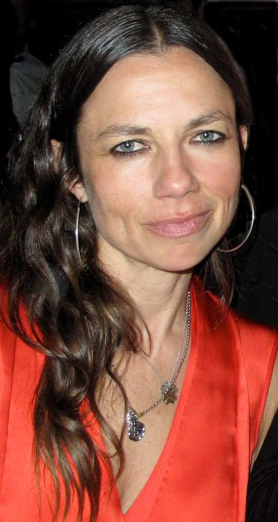
Justine Bateman – Best Supporting Actress in a Miniseries or Television Film

=== Best Actor – Drama Series ===
Michael Chiklis – The Shield

- David Boreanaz – Angel
- Anthony LaPaglia – Without a Trace
- Julian McMahon – Nip/Tuck
- David Paymer – Line of Fire
- Nick Stahl – Carnivàle

=== Best Actor – Musical or Comedy Series ===
Bernie Mac – The Bernie Mac Show

- Sacha Baron Cohen – Da Ali G Show
- Bryan Cranston – Malcolm in the Middle
- Larry David – Curb Your Enthusiasm
- Eric McCormack – Will & Grace
- Tony Shalhoub – Monk

=== Best Actor – Miniseries or TV Film ===
James Woods – Rudy: The Rudy Giuliani Story

- Robert Carlyle – Hitler: The Rise of Evil
- Troy Garity – Soldier's Girl
- Lee Pace – Soldier's Girl
- Al Pacino – Angels in America
- Tom Wilkinson – Normal

=== Best Actress – Drama Series ===
CCH Pounder – The Shield

- Jennifer Garner – Alias
- Amy Madigan – Carnivàle
- Ellen Muth – Dead Like Me
- Joely Richardson – Nip/Tuck
- Amber Tamblyn – Joan of Arcadia

=== Best Actress – Musical or Comedy Series ===
Jane Kaczmarek – Malcolm in the Middle

- Lauren Graham – Gilmore Girls
- Bonnie Hunt – Life with Bonnie
- Debra Messing – Will & Grace
- Alicia Silverstone – Miss Match
- Wanda Sykes – Wanda at Large

=== Best Actress – Miniseries or TV Film ===
Meryl Streep – Angels in America

- Felicity Huffman – Out of Order
- Jessica Lange – Normal
- Helen Mirren – The Roman Spring of Mrs. Stone
- Mary Tyler Moore – Blessings
- Maggie Smith – My House in Umbria

=== Best Miniseries ===
Angels in America

- Children of Dune
- Out of Order
- Doctor Zhivago
- Helen of Troy
- Hornblower: Loyalty

=== Best Series – Drama ===
The Shield

- Boomtown
- Carnivàle
- Law & Order: Special Victims Unit
- Nip/Tuck
- Six Feet Under

=== Best Series – Musical or Comedy ===
Arrested Development

- Da Ali G Show
- The Bernie Mac Show
- Curb Your Enthusiasm
- Kid Notorious
- Sex and the City

=== Best Supporting Actor – Drama Series ===
Neal McDonough – Boomtown

- Andy Hallett – Angel
- Hill Harper – The Handler
- Anthony Heald – Boston Public
- Michael Rosenbaum – Smallville
- Gregory Smith – Everwood

=== Best Supporting Actor – Musical or Comedy Series ===
Jeffrey Tambor – Arrested Development

- David Cross – Arrested Development
- David Alan Grier – Life with Bonnie
- Sean Hayes – Will & Grace
- Matt LeBlanc – Friends
- David Hyde Pierce – Frasier

=== Best Supporting Actor – Miniseries or TV Film ===
Justin Kirk – Angels in America

- Eion Bailey – And Starring Pancho Villa as Himself
- Chris Cooper – My House in Umbria
- Shawn Hatosy – Soldier's Girl
- Patrick Wilson – Angels in America
- Jeffrey Wright – Angels in America

=== Best Supporting Actress – Drama Series ===
Mary Steenburgen – Joan of Arcadia

- Amy Acker – Angel
- Adrienne Barbeau – Carnivàle
- Loretta Devine – Boston Public
- Lena Olin – Alias
- Gina Torres – Angel

=== Best Supporting Actress – Musical or Comedy Series ===
Jessica Walter – Arrested Development

- Kelly Bishop – Gilmore Girls
- Kim Cattrall – Sex and the City
- Jane Leeves – Frasier
- Christa Miller – Scrubs
- Portia de Rossi – Arrested Development

=== Best Supporting Actress – Miniseries or TV Film ===
Justine Bateman – Out of Order

- Jayne Atkinson – Our Town
- Anne Bancroft – The Roman Spring of Mrs. Stone
- Jane Curtin – Our Town
- Mary-Louise Parker – Angels in America
- Emma Thompson – Angels in America

=== Best TV Film ===
Rudy: The Rudy Giuliani Story

- And Starring Pancho Villa as Himself
- My House in Umbria
- Normal
- Our Town
- Soldier's Girl

== New Media winners and nominees ==
=== Best Classic DVD ===
Looney Tunes

- The Ace of Hearts, The Unknown, Laugh, Clown, Laugh, and Lon Chaney: A Thousand Faces (For "The Lon Chaney Collection".)
- From Russia with Love, You Only Live Twice, Diamonds Are Forever, Moonraker, For Your Eyes Only, The Living Daylights, The World Is Not Enough, Thunderball, On Her Majesty's Secret Service, Live and Let Die, Octopussy, A View to a Kill, and Die Another Day (For "The James Bond DVD Collection", volumes 2 & 3.)
- Modern Times, The Gold Rush, The Great Dictator, Limelight (For "The Charlie Chaplin Collection" (Warner).)
- Raiders of the Lost Ark, Indiana Jones and the Temple of Doom, and Indiana Jones and the Last Crusade (For "The Adventures of Indiana Jones" set.)
- Scarface

=== Best Documentary DVD ===
Lost in La Mancha

- The Blue Planet
- Canada: A People's History
- Gigantic (A Tale of Two Johns)
- Saturday Night Live – 25 Years of Music
- Trembling Before G-d

=== Best DVD Extras ===
Finding Nemo

- Firefly
- Alien, Aliens, Alien^{3}, and Alien Resurrection (For "The Alien Quadrilogy".)
- The Lord of the Rings: The Two Towers (For the Special Extended Edition.)
- Raiders of the Lost Ark, Indiana Jones and the Temple of Doom, and Indiana Jones and the Last Crusade (For "The Adventures of Indiana Jones" set.)
- Willard

=== Best DVD Release of TV Shows ===
Alias (For The Complete Second Season.)

- 24 (For The Complete Second Season.)
- Dawson's Creek (For The Complete Second Season.)
- Family Guy (For Volume 2.)
- Mr. Show with Bob and David (For The Complete Third Season.)
- Star Trek: Deep Space Nine (For Season 7.)

=== Most Innovative Story Design ===
XIII

- PlanetSide
- Star Wars: Knights of the Old Republic
- The Sims: Superstar
- True Crime: Streets of LA

=== Outstanding Art Direction ===
The Lord of the Rings: The Return of the King

- Battlefield 1942 (For the add-on "The Road to Rome".)
- Final Fantasy XI
- Max Payne 2: The Fall of Max Payne
- SOCOM II U.S. Navy SEALs

=== Outstanding Character ===
Grand Theft Auto: Vice City For "Tommy Vercetti" (Ray Liotta).

- Def Jam Vendetta For "Def Jam Crew" ('DMX'/Ludacris/Method Man/Redman).
- True Crime: Streets of LA For "Unknown" (Snoop Dogg).
- XIII For the XIII Voice (David Duchovny).

=== Outstanding Execution of a Gaming Concept ===
Star Wars: Knights of the Old Republic

- Call of Duty
- Enter the Matrix
- Max Payne 2: The Fall of Max Payne
- SOCOM II U.S. Navy SEALs
- The Lord of the Rings: The Return of the King

=== Outstanding Overall DVD ===
The Lord of the Rings: The Two Towers (For the Special Extended Edition.)

- Alien, Aliens, Alien 3, and Alien Resurrection (For "The Alien Quadrilogy".)
- Jackass: The Movie
- Looney Tunes: The Golden Collection
- Pirates of the Caribbean: The Curse of the Black Pearl
- Raiders of the Lost Ark, Indiana Jones and the Temple of Doom, and Indiana Jones and the Last Crusade (For "The Adventures of Indiana Jones" set.)

=== Outstanding Youth DVD ===
The Lion King (For the Platinum Edition.)

- Barbie of Swan Lake
- Finding Nemo
- It's a Very Merry Muppet Christmas Movie
- Itty Bitty Heartbeats
- Hooves of Fire, and Legend of the Lost Tribe (Robbie the Reindeer – Hooves of Fire/Legend of the Lost Tribe (US Versions))

== Awards breakdown ==
=== Film ===
Winners:

4 / 10 The Last Samurai: Best Cinematography / Best Costume Design / Best Editing / Best Original Score
3 / 5 Lost in Translation: Best Actor & Film – Musical or Comedy / Best Screenplay – Original
3 / 6 In America: Best Director / Best Film – Drama / Best Supporting Actor – Drama
2 / 7 Master and Commander: The Far Side of the World: Best Sound / Best Visual Effects
2 / 8 Mystic River: Best Actor – Drama / Best Screenplay – Adapted
1 / 1 Amandla!: A Revolution in Four-Part Harmony: Best Documentary Film
1 / 1 City of God (Cidade de Deus): Best Foreign Language Film
1 / 1 Monster: Best Actress – Drama
1 / 1 Something's Gotta Give: Best Actress – Musical or Comedy
1 / 1 The Triplets of Belleville (Les triplettes de Belleville): Best Animated or Mixed Media Film
1 / 2 Once Upon a Time in Mexico: Best Original Song
1 / 2 Pieces of April: Best Supporting Actress – Musical or Comedy
1 / 4 21 Grams: Best Actor – Drama
1 / 4 The Cooler: Best Supporting Actress – Drama
1 / 4 A Mighty Wind: Best Supporting Actor – Musical or Comedy
1 / 8 The Lord of the Rings: The Return of the King: Best Art Direction and Production Design

Losers:

0 / 8 Seabiscuit
0 / 6 Thirteen
0 / 5 American Splendor, Pirates of the Caribbean: The Curse of the Black Pearl
0 / 4 Kill Bill: Volume 1, Whale Rider
0 / 3 Cold Mountain, Love Actually
0 / 2 Bad Santa, Bend It Like Beckham, Brother Bear, Calendar Girls, Camp, Finding Nemo, House of Sand and Fog, Monsieur Ibrahim (Monsieur Ibrahim et les fleurs du Coran), Shattered Glass, The Station Agent

=== Television ===
Winners:

3 / 3 The Shield: Best Actor & Actress – Drama Series / Best Series – Drama
3 / 5 Arrested Development: Best Series – Musical or Comedy Series / Best Supporting Actor & Supporting Actress – Musical or Comedy Series
3 / 8 Angels in America: Best Actress & Supporting Actor – Miniseries or TV Film / Best Miniseries
2 / 2 Rudy: The Rudy Giuliani Story: Best Actor – Miniseries or TV Film / Best TV Film
1 / 2 The Bernie Mac Show: Best Actor – Musical or Comedy Series
1 / 2 Boomtown: Best Supporting Actor – Drama Series
1 / 2 Joan of Arcadia: Best Supporting Actress – Drama Series
1 / 2 Malcolm in the Middle: Best Actress – Musical or Comedy Series
1 / 3 Out of Order: Best Supporting Actress – Miniseries or TV Film

Losers:

0 / 4 Angel, Carnivàle, Soldier's Girl
0 / 3 Nip/Tuck, My House in Umbria, Normal, Will & Grace
0 / 2 Alias, Da Ali G Show, Curb Your Enthusiasm, Life with Bonnie, The Roman Spring of Mrs. Stone
