= Heidi (2005 live-action film) =

- DVD cover
- Directed by: Paul Marcus
- Written by: Brian Finch
- Based on: Heidi by Johanna Spyri
- Produced by: Christopher Figg; Martyn Auty
- Starring: Emma Bolger; Max von Sydow; Geraldine Chaplin; Diana Rigg
- Cinematography: Peter Sinclair
- Edited by: David Rees
- Music by: Jocelyn Pook
- Production companies: Piccadilly Pictures; Surefire Films; Storm Entertainment; Suitable Viewing; Lux Vide
- Distributed by: Storm Entertainment
- Release date: 19 August 2005
- Running time: 104 minutes
- Country: United Kingdom
- Language: English

Heidi is a 2005 British family film directed by Paul Marcus. It is based on the iconic 1881 novel Heidi by Johanna Spyri, and stars Irish child actress Emma Bolger in the title role, alongside Max Von Sydow and Diana Rigg.

== Plot ==
Heidi, a cheerful girl, is taken to live with her grandfather in the Swiss Alps. She becomes close friends with Peter, a goatherd, and spends much of her time with the boy and his goats outdoors.

Heidi is sent to the wealthy Sesemann family in Frankfurt, to be the hired companion of Clara Sesemann, an invalid. The strict housekeeper, Fräulein Rottenmeier, views the household disruptions Heidi causes as her misbehavior and places Heidi under increasing restrictions. Heidi grows homesick and pale. Her one diversion is learning to read and write, motivated by the thought of going home and reading to Peter's blind grandmother. Clara's grandmother visits and becomes a friend to Heidi.

After Heidi becomes seriously ill, the adults allow her to return to her grandfather. Heidi and Clara stay in touch and exchange letters. Clara's doctor, believing the fresh mountain air and wholesome companionship will do her good, recommends that Clara visit Heidi. Clara visits again the following season and spends a wonderful summer with Heidi, growing stronger on goat milk and fresh air. Peter, jealous of Heidi and Clara's friendship, pushes Clara's empty wheelchair down the mountain. The wheelchair is destroyed. While retrieving the wheelchair for Clara, Heidi nearly falls into a ravine. Clara rushes to save her and finds herself able to walk. Her grandmother and father are overcome with joy, and the doctor promises to take care of Heidi when her grandfather's no longer able to do so.

== Cast ==
- Emma Bolger as Heidi
- Max Von Sydow as Grandfather
- Geraldine Chaplin as Rottenmeier
- Diana Rigg as Grandmamma
- Pauline McLynn as Aunt Dete
- Sam Friend as Peter
- Jessica Claridge as Clara
- Del Synnott as Sebastian
- Kellie Shirley as Tinette
- Robert Bathurst as Mr. Sessemann
- Oliver Ford Davies as Dr. Classen
- Caroline Pegg as Bridget
- Jessica James as Grannie
- Alexander Main as Frankfurt Boy
- Karl Johnson as Old Man

== Production ==
The soundtrack is composed by Jocelyn Pook. The mountain scenes were shot mostly in Julian Alps in Slovenia, scenes of Frankfurt in Ljubljana and village scenes in Neath, and Llanelli, Wales. The Sesemann house in Frankfurt was shot at Stradey Castle in Llanelli.

== Music ==
The film is composed by Jocelyn Pook. Rie fu's "Until I Say" is the Japanese theme song.
