= In America (film) =

2002 film by Jim Sheridan

- Theatrical release poster
- Directed by: Jim Sheridan
- Written by: Jim Sheridan; Naomi Sheridan; Kirsten Sheridan
- Produced by: Jim Sheridan; Arthur Lappin
- Starring: Samantha Morton; Paddy Considine; Sarah Bolger; Emma Bolger; Djimon Hounsou
- Cinematography: Declan Quinn
- Edited by: Naomi Geraghty
- Music by: Gavin Friday; Maurice Seezer
- Production companies: Hell's Kitchen Films; East of Harlem (UK) Ltd.
- Distributed by: Fox Searchlight Pictures
- Release dates: 12 September 2002 (TIFF); 31 October 2003 (United Kingdom); 6 February 2004 (United States)
- Running time: 105 minutes
- Countries: Ireland; United States; United Kingdom
- Language: English
- Box office: $25.4 million

In America is a 2002 drama film directed by Jim Sheridan. The semi-autobiographical screenplay was written by Jim Sheridan and his daughters, Naomi and Kirsten. A co-production between Ireland, United States and the United Kingdom, it focuses on an immigrant Irish family's struggle to start a new life in New York City, as seen through the eyes of the elder daughter.

At the 76th Academy Awards, it was nominated for Best Original Screenplay for the Sheridans, Best Actress for Samantha Morton and Best Supporting Actor for Djimon Hounsou. At the 9th Critics' Choice Awards, the film won Best Original Screenplay, in addition to the Stanley Kramer Award win at the 15th Producers Guild of America Awards. The film also was nominated for two Golden Globes.

== Plot ==
Johnny and Sarah Sullivan and their two daughters Christy and Ariel enter the United States on a tourist visa from Ireland via Canada. The family settles in New York City, in a rundown Hell's Kitchen walk-up tenement occupied by drug addicts, and a reclusive Nigerian artist/photographer named Mateo Kuamey. Hanging over the family is the death of their five-year-old son Frankie, who died from a brain tumor discovered after a fall down the stairs. Christy believes she has been granted three wishes by her dead brother, which she only uses at times of near-dire consequences for the family as they try to survive in New York.

With Johnny having no luck getting acting work, Sarah gets a job in the local ice cream parlor to support the family. Despite their poverty, the initial joy of being in the United States and the closeness of the family gives them the energy to make the most of what they have, and Christy chronicles the events of their life with a cherished camcorder.

Fed up with the heat and not being able to take care of his family, Johnny finds an old air conditioner and stubbornly walks it up the apartment. As money runs low and the city's temperatures soar, the family dip into savings to go to the movies to see E.T. the Extra-Terrestrial. Johnny risks all their money on a carnival game to win an E.T. toy for Ariel, another reckless decision rooted in feeling inadequate.

Eventually Johnny finds work as a cab driver to augment their income and help pay for the girls' Catholic school tuition.

Tensions between Johnny and Sarah begin to rise with the summer heat. The discovery of Sarah's pregnancy places even more financial and emotional strain on the family. Doctors warned Sarah that if she had another baby, it could kill her.

On Halloween, the girls become friendly with Mateo when they knock at his door to trick-or-treat. Despite Johnny's reticence about the somewhat imposing and forbidding man, Sarah invites him to their apartment for dinner. Later, Johnny storms out during an argument with Sara and confronts Mateo about his relationship with his wife. He confesses to him has lost any ability to feel true emotions, which has affected both his relationship with his family and his acting career. Johnny realizes Mateo is dying.

When Mateo falls down a flight of stairs and is knocked unconscious, Christy tries to resuscitate him using CPR, although she is warned away from him by the other residents, who seem to be aware that he has what we are left to assume is AIDS. The man's condition continues to deteriorate as Sarah's fetus develops. The baby is born prematurely and in poor health, and is in need of a blood transfusion. Johnny and Sarah are ultimately nervous not only about the baby's survival chances, but also of the skyrocketing hospital bills that will now need to be paid following the baby's delivery. After the birth, Sarah has an episode from the premature birth and past trauma from Frankie’s death, blaming Johnny for what happened. Johnny is confused about which baby she is talking about, and does not fully remember that his late son is gone.

However, after calming her down, Johnny and Sarah agree to the blood transfusion, but without giving the baby "bad blood," as using hospital blood banks was the source of Mateo's contraction of HIV. Christy has a compatible blood type to donate with, and Mateo's death coincides with the first healthy movements of the infant following a blood transfusion from Christy. After receiving a hospital bill over $30,000, Johnny is startled to learn that Mateo had settled the bill. They give the newborn baby girl the middle name of Mateo in gratitude and to honor his memory. Ariel laments that Mateo never said goodbye to her, like he promised he would.

After a baby shower at their home, Johnny brings Christy and Ariel to the fire escape to “watch Mateo flying by the moon and waving goodbye.” Like E.T.

Christy tells her dad to say goodbye to Frankie. With tears in his eyes, Johnny says goodbye to Frankie. An emotional breakthrough that leads to him finally getting a role in a play.

The film ends with Christy watching Frankie on her camcorder. She shuts it off and says she doesn’t want to remember him that way anymore. Having been the narrator throughout the film, she asks the audience if we have a picture of her in our heads. That’s how she wants to remember Frankie.

== Cast ==
- Samantha Morton as Sarah Sullivan
- Paddy Considine as Johnny Sullivan
- Sarah Bolger as Christy Sullivan
- Emma Bolger as Ariel Sullivan
- Djimon Hounsou as Mateo Kuamey
- David Wike as Barker
- Michael Sean Tighe as Frank
- Juan Hernandez as Papo
- Rene Millan as Steve
- Nick Dunning as Gynaecologist
- Frank Wood as Paediatrician
- Merrina Millsapp as Marina, waitress at the "Heaven" ice cream parlor
- Bernadette Quigley as Hospital Administrator
- Adrian Martinez as Shopkeeper
- Des Bishop as Stockbroker in Taxi
- Jason Salkey as Tony
- Neal Jones as Immigration Officer
- Bob Gallico as Theatre Director
- Sara James as Papo's Girlfriend

== Production ==
The film is dedicated to director/screenwriter Jim Sheridan's brother Frankie, who died at the age of ten. In The Making of in America, a featurette on the DVD release of the film, Sheridan explains Christy and Ariel are based on his daughters—and co-writers—Naomi and Kirsten. He says they wanted to make a film showing how people can learn to overcome their pain and live for the future instead of dwelling on the sadness of the past.

Though the character of Mateo appears to be a signifier of the early AIDS epidemic in the 1980s, Sheridan said it wasn't his intention to set the film in the 1980s explicitly, saying, "I didn’t want everybody from the art department running around changing the license plates on cars in New York. So I gave (Christy) a camcorder and shifted it into the '90s, but I kept the tone of the '80s, so I made it the recent past, like a mythological past, and that’s a lie, yeah. But it’s better than running around like an idiot getting factual truths".

Manhattan locations include Hell's Kitchen, Times Square, the Lincoln Tunnel, and 8th Street in the East Village. Shooting began in October 2001, and it was the first film to be shot in Manhattan following the September 11 terrorist attacks.

Interiors were filmed at the Ardmore Studios in County Wicklow in Ireland. The fairground scene was filmed on Parnell Street, Dublin.

The soundtrack includes songs performed by The Lovin' Spoonful, Culture Club, The Corrs, The Byrds, Kid Creole and The Coconuts, Evan Olson, and The Langhorns.

== Release and reception ==
The film premiered at the 2002 Toronto International Film Festival. In 2003, it was shown at the Sundance Film Festival, the Boston Irish Film Festival, the Tribeca Film Festival, the Edinburgh Film Festival, the Hamburg Film Festival, the Warsaw Film Festival, the Dinard Festival of British Cinema, and the Austin Film Festival.

=== Box office ===
The film opened in the UK on 31 October 2003, where it earned £284,259 on its opening weekend. It opened in limited release in the US on 26 November. It eventually grossed $15,539,656 in the US and $9,843,255 elsewhere, for a total worldwide box office of $25,382,911

=== Critical response ===
Rotten Tomatoes gave the film a score of 90%, based on 175 reviews, and an average rating of 7.75/10. The website's critical consensus states, "A rich and moving story about an immigrant family adjusting to life in New York". Metacritic assigned the film a weighted average score of 76 out of 100, based on 41 critics, indicating "generally favorable" reviews.

In his review in The New York Times, A. O. Scott called it a "modest, touching film" and added, "Many of [its] elements . . . seem to promise a sticky bath of shameless sentimentality. But instead, thanks to Jim Sheridan's graceful, scrupulously sincere direction and the dry intelligence of his cast, In America is likely to pierce the defenses of all but the most dogmatically cynical viewers . . . Mr. Sheridan is more interested in particular people than in general plights, and what lingers in the mind after you have seen his movies is the rough, radiant individuality of his characters . . . This movie, from moment to moment, feels small, almost anecdotal. It is only afterward that, like Mr. Sheridan's other films, it starts to grow into something at once unassuming and in its own way grand."

Roger Ebert of the Chicago Sun-Times observed, "In America is not unsentimental about its new arrivals (the movie has a warm heart and frankly wants to move us), but it is perceptive about the countless ways in which it is hard to be poor and a stranger in a new land."

In the San Francisco Chronicle, Walter Addiego stated, "I fought hard against the emotionalism of In America . . . but I lost. There's no questioning the director's ability to wring moving moments from potentially sentimental and decidedly familiar material: the story of penniless immigrants trying to make it in Manhattan. It got to me. I'm still trying to decide whether I was won over or worn down — but why not give Sheridan the benefit of the doubt? . . . [He] is clearly drawing on deep personal reserves for this picture, and despite a few sequences when the creative hand seems intrusive, does well by his subject. When you see a director going for that lump-in-the-throat mood, instinct takes over and you want to dig in your heels. Sometimes it's best just to let yourself be swept away."

Peter Travers of Rolling Stone rated the film three out of a possible four stars, calling it "forceful, funny and impassioned" and "an emotional wipeout".

In the St. Petersburg Times, Steve Persall graded the film A and added, "This is a tearjerker for all the right reasons. Because it's delicately manipulative and the characters are so precisely emotional. And because Sheridan's manner with the material makes crying seem like a cleansing, an affirmation that something so simple and sweet can still move us . . . I loved this unassuming, heartfelt little gem, even if I couldn't stop sobbing for an hour after the show. It's just so beautiful."

Claudia Puig of USA Today called it "touching, but not cloying, uplifting and hopeful but never sappy and also just plain funny. There is not a false note among the five core performances, nor a false word in Sheridan's script. In America is a classic story of losing and finding faith told with heart, humor and emotional heft."

In The Observer, Philip French said, "The movie lacks conviction from implausible beginning to sentimental end."

=== Home media ===
The film was released on DVD in 2003 by 20th Century Fox Home Entertainment, and the release featured an audio commentary by director Jim Sheridan. On March 20, 2019, Rupert Murdoch sold most of 21st Century Fox's film and television assets to The Walt Disney Company (including the indie film division Fox Searchlight), and In America was one of the films included in the deal. The film was subsequently added to Disney's adult-focused streaming service Hulu, while in countries without Hulu, it was added to their other streaming service Disney+.

=== Awards and nominations ===
Awards	Date of ceremony	Category	Nominee(s)	Result	Ref.
Academy Awards	29 February 2004	Best Actress	Samantha Morton	Nominated	
Academy Awards	29 February 2004	Best Supporting Actor	Djimon Hounsou	Nominated	
Academy Awards	29 February 2004	Best Original Screenplay	Jim Sheridan, Naomi Sheridan, Kirsten Sheridan	Nominated	
American Film Institute	November 2003	Audience Award for Best Feature Film		Won	
Bangkok International Film Festival	31 January 2004	Golden Kinnaree Award for Best Director	Jim Sheridan	Won	
Black Reel Awards	22 February 2004	Best Supporting Actor	Djimon Hounsou	Won	
British Independent Film Awards	4 November 2003	Best Actor	Paddy Considine	Nominated	
British Independent Film Awards	4 November 2003	Best Actress	Samantha Morton	Nominated	
British Independent Film Awards	4 November 2003	Best Director	Jim Sheridan	Nominated	
Critics’ Choice Awards	10 January 2004	Best Writer	Jim Sheridan, Naomi Sheridan, Kirsten Sheridan	Won	
Critics’ Choice Awards	10 January 2004	Best Film		Nominated	
Critics’ Choice Awards	10 January 2004	Best Actress	Samantha Morton	Nominated	
Critics’ Choice Awards	10 January 2004	Best Director	Jim Sheridan	Nominated	
Critics’ Choice Awards	10 January 2004	Best Young Performer	Sarah Bolger, Emma Bolger	Nominated	
Critics’ Choice Awards	10 January 2004	Best Song	"Time Enough for Tears" by Bono, Gavin Friday, Maurice Seezer	Nominated	
Film Fest Gent	October 2003	Grand Prix for Best Film	Jim Sheridan	Won	
Golden Globe Awards	25 January 2004	Best Screenplay	Jim Sheridan, Naomi Sheridan, Kirsten Sheridan	Nominated	
Golden Globe Awards	25 January 2004	Best Original Song	"Time Enough for Tears" by Bono, Gavin Friday, Maurice Seezer	Nominated	
Independent Spirit Awards	28 February 2004	Best Supporting Actor	Djimon Hounsou	Won	
Independent Spirit Awards	28 February 2004	Best Cinematography	Declan Quinn	Won	
Independent Spirit Awards	28 February 2004	Best Film		Nominated	
Independent Spirit Awards	28 February 2004	Best Director	Jim Sheridan	Nominated	
Independent Spirit Awards	28 February 2004	Best Actress	Samantha Morton	Nominated	
Independent Spirit Awards	28 February 2004	Best Supporting Actress	Sarah Bolger	Nominated	
National Board of Review Awards	3 December 2003	Best Original Screenplay	Jim Sheridan, Naomi Sheridan, Kirsten Sheridan	Won	
NAACP Image Awards	6 March 2004	Outstanding Supporting Actor in a Motion Picture	Djimon Hounsou	Nominated	
Phoenix Film Critics Society Awards	12 January 2004	Best Original Song	"Time Enough for Tears" by Bono, Gavin Friday, Maurice Seezer	Won	
Phoenix Film Critics Society Awards	12 January 2004	Best Original Screenplay	Jim Sheridan, Naomi Sheridan, Kirsten Sheridan	Won	
Phoenix Film Critics Society Awards	12 January 2004	Best Performance by a Youth in a Lead or Supporting Role – Female–	Sarah Bolger	Won	
Phoenix Film Critics Society Awards	12 January 2004	Best Film		Nominated	
Phoenix Film Critics Society Awards	12 January 2004	Best Director	Jim Sheridan	Nominated	
Phoenix Film Critics Society Awards	12 January 2004	Best Performance by a Youth in a Lead or Supporting Role – Female	Emma Bolger	Nominated	
Producers Guild of America Awards	17 January 2004	Stanley Kramer Award	Jim Sheridan, Arthur Lappin	Won	
San Diego Film Critics Society Awards	18 December 2003	Best Supporting Actor	Djimon Hounsou	Won	
Satellite Awards	21 February 2004	Best Film – Drama		Won	
Satellite Awards	21 February 2004	Best Director	Jim Sheridan	Won	
Satellite Awards	21 February 2004	Best Supporting Actor – Motion Picture	Djimon Hounsou	Won	
Satellite Awards	21 February 2004	Best Actor - Motion Picture Drama	Paddy Considine	Nominated	
Satellite Awards	21 February 2004	Best Actress - Motion Picture Drama	Samantha Morton	Nominated	
Satellite Awards	21 February 2004	Best Supporting Actress - Motion Picture	Sarah Bolger	Nominated	
Screen Actors Guild Awards	22 February 2004	Outstanding Performance by a Cast in a Motion Picture	Paddy Considine, Samantha Morton, Djimon Hounsou, Sarah Bolger, Emma Bolger	Nominated	
Writers Guild of America Awards	21 February 2004	Best Original Screenplay	Jim Sheridan, Naomi Sheridan, Kirsten Sheridan	Nominated	
Young Artist Awards	8 May 2004	Best Performance in a Feature Film – Young Actress Age Ten or Younger	Emma Bolger	Won	

== See also ==
- Irish Americans
