= 9th Critics' Choice Awards =

2004 US film awards

- Date: January 10, 2004
- Official website: www.criticschoice.com

Highlights
- Best Film: The Lord of the Rings: The Return of the King

The 9th Critics' Choice Awards were presented on January 10, 2004, honoring the finest achievements of 2003 filmmaking.

== Top 10 films ==
(in alphabetical order)

- Big Fish
- Cold Mountain
- Finding Nemo
- In America
- The Last Samurai
- The Lord of the Rings: The Return of the King
- Lost in Translation
- Master and Commander: The Far Side of the World
- Mystic River
- Seabiscuit

== Winners and nominees ==
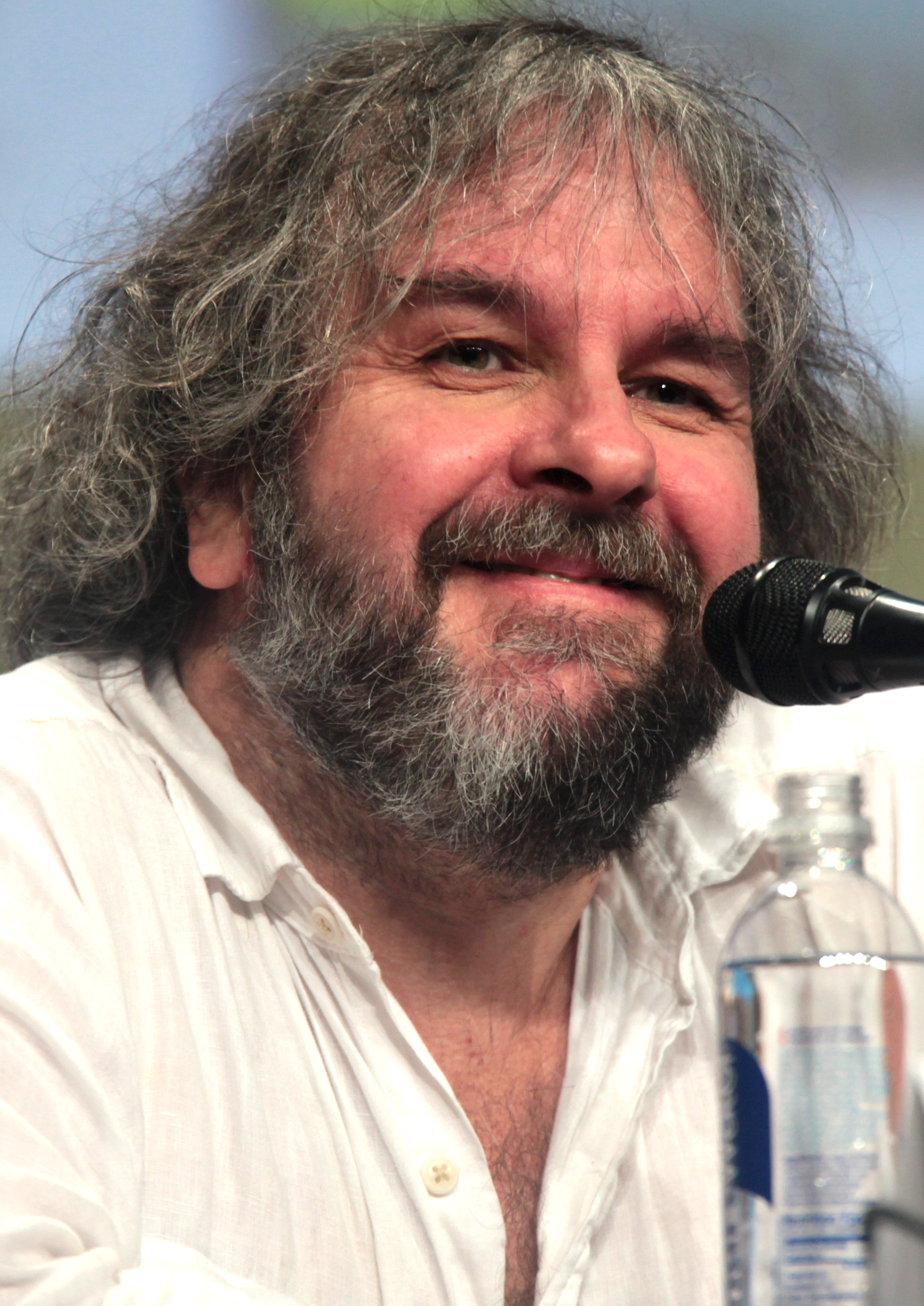
Peter Jackson, Best Director winner

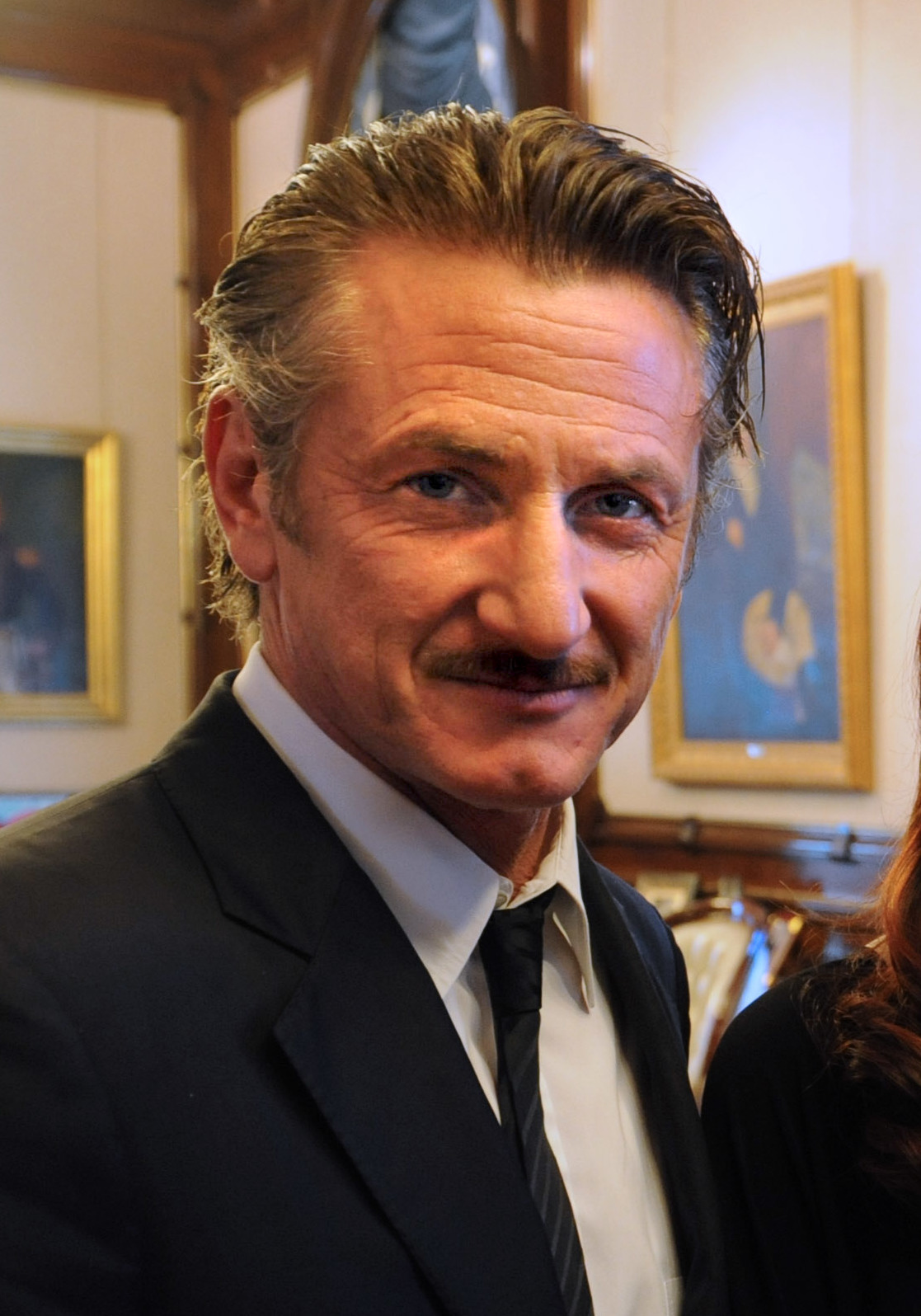
Sean Penn, Best Actor winner

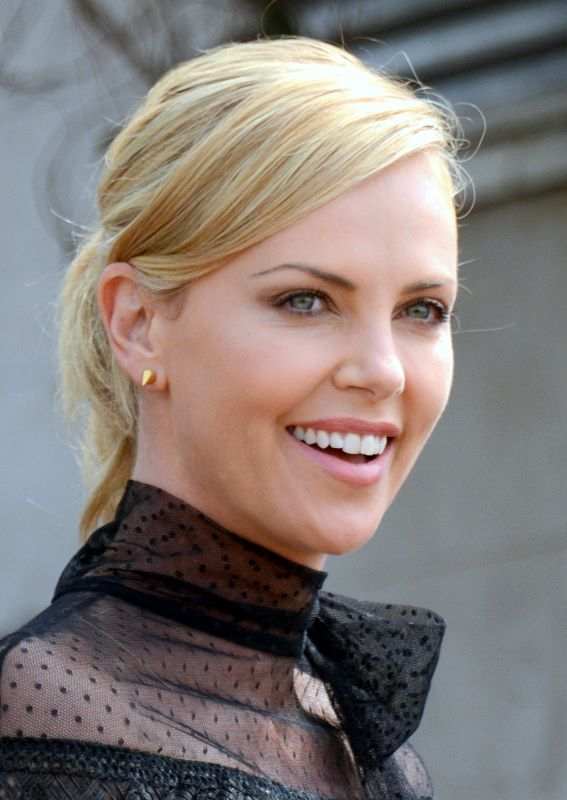
Charlize Theron, Best Actress winner

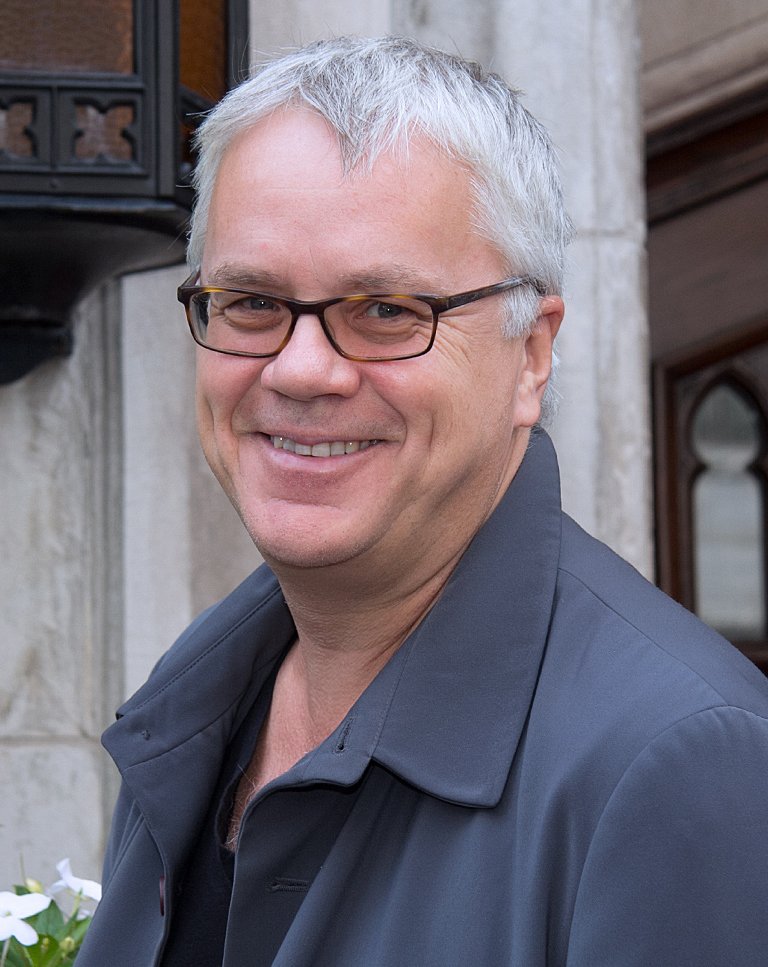
Tim Robbins, Best Supporting Actor winner

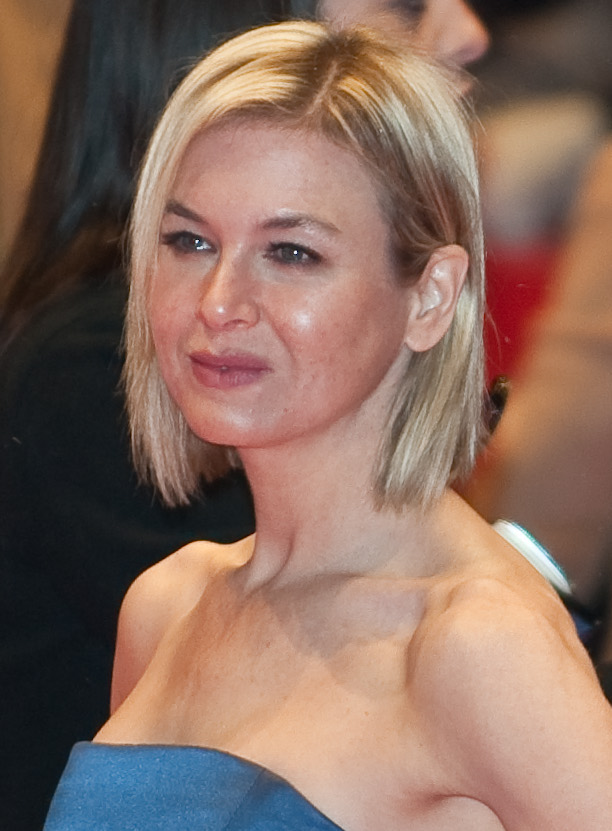
Renée Zellweger, Best Supporting Actress winner

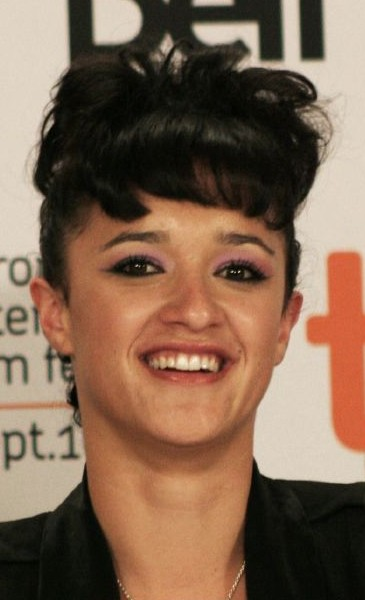
Keisha Castle-Hughes, Best Young Actor/Actress winner

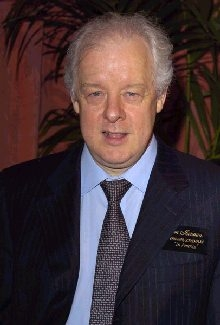
Jim Sheridan, Best Writer co-winner

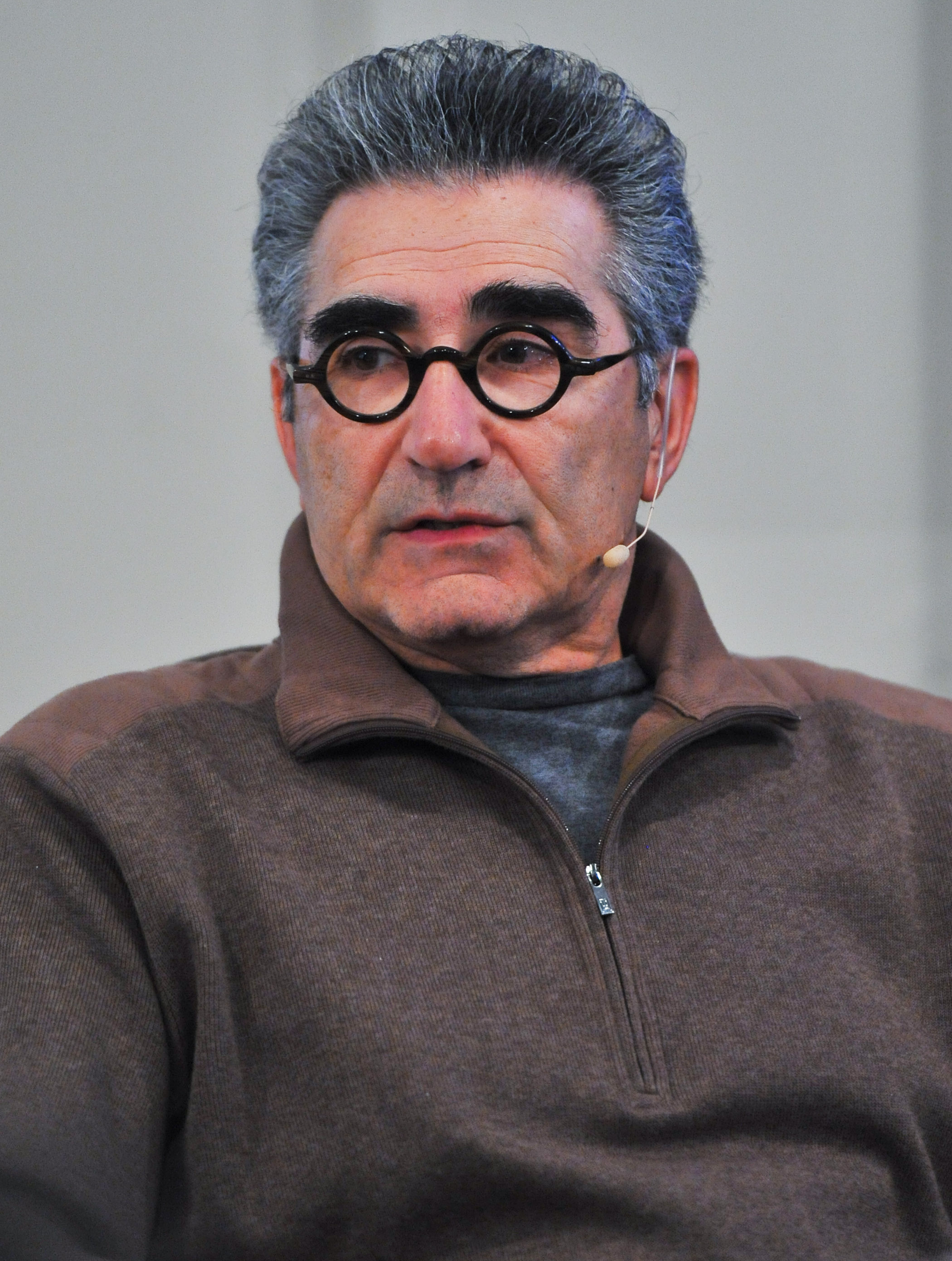
Eugene Levy, Best Song co-winner

Best Picture The Lord of the Rings: The Return of the King: Big Fish; Cold Mountain; Finding Nemo; In America; The Last Samurai; Lost in Translation; Master and Commander: The Far Side of the World; Mystic River; Seabiscuit	Best Director Peter Jackson – The Lord of the Rings: The Return of the King: Tim Burton – Big Fish; Sofia Coppola – Lost in Translation; Clint Eastwood – Mystic River; Jim Sheridan – In America
Best Actor Sean Penn – Mystic River as Jimmy Markum: Russell Crowe – Master and Commander: The Far Side of the World as Captain Jack Aubrey; Johnny Depp – Pirates of the Caribbean: The Curse of the Black Pearl as Captain Jack Sparrow; Ben Kingsley – House of Sand and Fog as Colonel Massoud Amir Behrani; Bill Murray – Lost in Translation as Bob Harris	Best Actress Charlize Theron – Monster as Aileen Wuornos: Jennifer Connelly – House of Sand and Fog as Kathy Nicolo; Diane Keaton – Something's Gotta Give as Erica Barry; Nicole Kidman – Cold Mountain as Ada Monroe; Samantha Morton – In America as Sarah Sullivan; Naomi Watts – 21 Grams as Cristina Peck
Best Supporting Actor Tim Robbins – Mystic River as Dave Boyle: Alec Baldwin – The Cooler as Sheldon Kaplow; Paul Bettany – Master and Commander: The Far Side of the World as Stephen Maturin; Benicio del Toro – 21 Grams as Jack Jordan; Ken Watanabe – The Last Samurai as Lord Moritsugu Katsumoto	Best Supporting Actress Renée Zellweger – Cold Mountain as Ruby Thewes: Patricia Clarkson – Pieces of April as Joy Burns; Marcia Gay Harden – Mystic River as Celeste Samarco Boyle; Holly Hunter – Thirteen as Melanie Freeland; Scarlett Johansson – Lost in Translation as Charlotte
Best Young Actor/Actress Keisha Castle-Hughes – Whale Rider as Paikea Apirana: Emma Bolger – In America as Ariel Sullivan; Sarah Bolger – In America as Christy Sullivan; Evan Rachel Wood – Thirteen as Tracy Freeland	Best Acting Ensemble The Lord of the Rings: The Return of the King: Love Actually; A Mighty Wind; Mystic River
Best Writer	Best Animated Feature
In America – Jim Sheridan, Kirsten Sheridan and Naomi Sheridan: Big Fish – John August; Lost in Translation – Sofia Coppola; Mystic River – Brian Helgeland; Seabiscuit – Gary Ross	Finding Nemo: Brother Bear; The Triplets of Belleville
Best Documentary Feature	Best Family Film
Capturing the Friedmans: The Fog of War; Ghosts of the Abyss	Pirates of the Caribbean: The Curse of the Black Pearl: Freaky Friday; Holes; Peter Pan; Whale Rider
Best Foreign Language Film The Barbarian Invasions • Canada / France: City of God • Brazil; Swimming Pool • France / United Kingdom	Best Composer The Lord of the Rings: The Return of the King – Howard Shore: Big Fish – Danny Elfman; Cold Mountain – Gabriel Yared; The Last Samurai – Hans Zimmer; Mystic River – Clint Eastwood
Best Song
"A Mighty Wind" (Christopher Guest, Michael McKean, and Eugene Levy) – A Mighty Wind: "The Heart of Every Girl" (Elton John) – Mona Lisa Smile; "Man of the Hour" (Pearl Jam) – Big Fish; "School of Rock" (Jack Black) – School of Rock; "Time Enough for Tears" (Andrea Corr) – In America

=== Passion in Film Award ===
Peter Weir – Master and Commander: The Far Side of the World

=== Lifetime Achievement Award ===
Clint Eastwood

=== Best Picture Made for Television ===
Angels in America

- And Starring Pancho Villa as Himself
- The Reagans

== Statistics ==
Nominations	Film
8	Mystic River
7	In America
5	Big Fish
5	Lost in Translation
4	Cold Mountain
4	The Lord of the Rings: The Return of the King
3	The Last Samurai
3	Master and Commander: The Far Side of the World
2	21 Grams
2	Finding Nemo
2	House of Sand and Fog
2	A Mighty Wind
2	Pirates of the Caribbean: The Curse of the Black Pearl
2	Seabiscuit
2	Thirteen
2	Whale Rider

Wins	Film
4	The Lord of the Rings: The Return of the King
2	Mystic River
