= List of awards and nominations received by Malcolm in the Middle =

List of awards won by Malcolm in the Middle
Awards & Nominations
Malcolm in the Middle
Award	Won	Nominated
AFI Awards	147	178

Malcolm in the Middle is an American sitcom created by Linwood Boomer for the Fox Broadcasting Company. The series follows a dysfunctional, working-class family, focusing on child prodigy Malcolm (Frankie Muniz), who also narrates the series by addressing the audience. Other main characters include Malcolm's mother Lois (Jane Kaczmarek), father Hal (Bryan Cranston), older brothers Francis (Christopher Masterson) and Reese (Justin Berfield), and younger brother Dewey (Erik Per Sullivan).

Originally broadcast between January 2000 and May 2006. It has won and been nominated for a variety of different awards, including 33 Emmy Award nominations across the seven seasons of the show. The show was nominated for the Primetime Emmy Award for Outstanding Comedy Series for its second season, but lost out to Sex and the City.

Jane Kaczmarek, who portrays the eponymous character's mother Lois, was nominated for the award of Outstanding Actress in a Comedy Series seven times (once for each season), without ever winning the award.

== By award ==
=== AFI Awards ===
Year	Category	Nominee(s)	Result
2002	Actor of the Year-Female-series	Jane Kaczmarek	Nominated
2002	Comedy Series of the Year		Nominated

=== American Cinema Editors ===
Year	Category	Nominee(s)	Episode	Result
2000	Best Edited Half-Hour Series	Nancy Morrison	"Pilot"	Won
2001	Best Edited Half-Hour Series	for Barry Gold	"Book Club"	Nominated

=== American Comedy Awards ===
Year	Category	Nominee(s)	Result
2001	Funniest Female Performer in a TV Series (Leading Role) Network, Cable or Syndication	Jane Kaczmarek	Won
2001	Funniest Female Guest Appearance in a TV Series	Beatrice Arthur	Won

=== Directors Guild of America Awards ===
Year	Category	Nominee	Episode	Result
2000	Outstanding Directorial Achievement in Comedy Series	Todd Holland	"Pilot"	Nominated
2002	Outstanding Directorial Achievement in Comedy Series	Todd Holland	"Bowling"	Won

=== Emmy Awards ===
Year	Category	Nominee(s)	Result
2000	Outstanding Directing for a Comedy Series	Todd Holland (for "Pilot")	Won
2000	Outstanding Lead Actress in a Comedy Series	Jane Kaczmarek	Nominated
2000	Outstanding Guest Actress in a Comedy Series	Bea Arthur (for "Water Park")	Nominated
2000	Outstanding Writing for a Comedy Series	Linwood Boomer (for "Pilot")	Won
2000	Outstanding Casting for a Comedy Series	Ken Miller, Mary V. Buck, Nikki Valko, Susan Edelman	Nominated
2001	Outstanding Comedy Series	Linwood Boomer, Bob Stevens, Gary Murphy, Neil Thompson, Alan J. Higgins, Michael Glouberman, Andrew Orenstein, Todd Holland, Alex Reid, James Simons, Ken Kwapis, Jeff Melman	Nominated
2001	Outstanding Directing for a Comedy Series	Todd Holland (for "Bowling")	Won
2001	Outstanding Directing for a Comedy Series	Jeff Melman (for "Flashback")	Nominated
2001	Outstanding Lead Actor in a Comedy Series	Frankie Muniz	Nominated
2001	Outstanding Lead Actress in a Comedy Series	Jane Kaczmarek	Nominated
2001	Outstanding Guest Actor in a Comedy Series	Robert Loggia (for "Grandparents")	Nominated
2001	Outstanding Guest Actress in a Comedy Series	Cloris Leachman (for "Grandparents")	Nominated
2001	Outstanding Writing for a Comedy Series	Alex Reid (for "Bowling")	Won
2002	Outstanding Directing for a Comedy Series	Jeff Melman (for "Christmas")	Nominated
2002	Outstanding Lead Actress in a Comedy Series	Jane Kaczmarek	Nominated
2002	Outstanding Supporting Actor in a Comedy Series	Bryan Cranston	Nominated
2002	Outstanding Guest Actress in a Comedy Series	Cloris Leachman (for "Christmas")	Won
2002	Outstanding Guest Actress in a Comedy Series	Susan Sarandon (for "Company Picnic")	Nominated
2002	Outstanding Stunt Coordination	Bobby Porter (for "Company Picnic")	Nominated
2003	Outstanding Lead Actress in a Comedy Series	Jane Kaczmarek	Nominated
2003	Outstanding Supporting Actor in a Comedy Series	Bryan Cranston	Nominated
2003	Outstanding Guest Actress in a Comedy Series	Cloris Leachman	Nominated
2003	Outstanding Single Camera Picture Editing for a Comedy Series	Mark Scheib, Steve Welch (for "If Boys Were Girls")	Won
2004	Outstanding Lead Actress in a Comedy Series	Jane Kaczmarek	Nominated
2004	Outstanding Guest Actress in a Comedy Series	Cloris Leachman	Nominated
2004	Outstanding Choreography	Fred Tallaksen (for "Dewey's Special Class")	Nominated
2005	Outstanding Lead Actress in a Comedy Series	Jane Kaczmarek	Nominated
2005	Outstanding Guest Actress in a Comedy Series	Cloris Leachman (for "Ida Loses A Leg" and "Ida's Dance")	Nominated
2005	Outstanding Music and Lyrics	Charles Sydnor, Eric Kaplan (for "The Marriage Bed") (for "Dewey's Opera")	Nominated
2006	Outstanding Lead Actress in a Comedy Series	Jane Kaczmarek	Nominated
2006	Outstanding Supporting Actor in a Comedy Series	Bryan Cranston	Nominated
2006	Outstanding Guest Actress in a Comedy Series	Cloris Leachman (for "Bride of Ida" and "Graduation")	Won
2006	Outstanding Choreography	Fred Tallaksen (for "Bomb Shelter")	Nominated

=== Golden Globe Awards ===
Year	Category	Nominee(s)	Result
2000	Best Actor – Musical or Comedy Series	Frankie Muniz	Nominated
2000	Best Actress – Television Series Musical or Comedy	Jane Kaczmarek	Nominated
2000	Best TV Series - Comedy or Musical		Nominated
2001	Best Actor – Musical or Comedy Series	Frankie Muniz	Nominated
2001	Best Actress – Musical or Comedy Series	Jane Kaczmarek	Nominated
2002	Best Actress – Musical or Comedy Series	Jane Kaczmarek	Nominated
2002	Best Supporting Actor – Series, Miniseries or Television Film	Bryan Cranston	Nominated

=== Grammy Awards ===
Year	Category	Nominee(s)	Song	Result
2001	Best Song Written for a Motion Picture, Television or Other Visual Media	John Flansburgh and John Linnell	"Boss of Me"	Won

=== NAACP Image Awards ===
Year	Category	Nominee(s)	Result
2000	Outstanding Young Actor/Actress	Craig Lamar Traylor	Nominated

=== Producers Guild of America ===
Year	Category	Result
2001	The Danny Thomas Producer of the Year Award in Episodic Series – Comedy	Nominated
2002	The Danny Thomas Producer of the Year Award in Episodic Series – Comedy	Nominated
2003	The Danny Thomas Producer of the Year Award in Episodic Series – Comedy	Nominated

=== Satellite Awards ===
Year	Category	Nominee(s)	Result
2000	Best Actor – Musical or Comedy Series	Frankie Muniz	Won
2001	Best Actress – Musical or Comedy Series	Jane Kaczmarek	Nominated
2003	Best Actress – Musical or Comedy Series	Jane Kaczmarek	Won
2003	Best Actor – Musical or Comedy Series	Bryan Cranston	Nominated

=== Screen Actors Guild Awards ===
Year	Category	Nominee(s)	Result
2000	Outstanding Performance by a Female Actor in a Comedy Series	Jane Kaczmarek	Nominated
2002	Outstanding Performance by a Female Actor in a Comedy Series	Jane Kaczmarek	Nominated

=== TCA Awards ===
Year	Category	Nominee(s)	Result
2000	Outstanding Achievement in Comedy		Won
2000	Outstanding New Program		Nominated
2000	Individual Achievement in Comedy	Jane Kaczmarek	Won
2000	Individual Achievement in Comedy	Frankie Muniz	Nominated
2001	Outstanding Achievement in Comedy		Won
2001	Individual Achievement in Comedy	Bryan Cranston	Nominated
2001	Individual Achievement in Comedy	Jane Kaczmarek	Won

=== Viewers for Quality Television Awards ===
Year	Category	Nominee(s)	Result
2000	Best Actress in a Quality Comedy Series	Jane Kaczmarek	Nominated

=== Writers Guild of America ===
Year	Category	Nominee(s)	Episode	Result
2001	Best Episodic Comedy	Gary Murphy and Neil Thompson	"Grandparents"	Nominated
2001	Best Episodic Comedy	Alex Reid	"Bowling"	Nominated
2003	Best Episodic Comedy	Dan Kopelman	"Malcolm Films Reese"	Nominated
2003	Best Episodic Comedy	Gary Murphy and Neil Thompson	"Day Care"	Nominated
2004	Best Episodic Comedy	Neil Thompson	"Ida's Boyfriend"	Won
2005	Best Episodic Comedy	Rob Ulin	"Motivational Speaker"	Nominated
2006	Best Episodic Comedy	Rob Ulin	"Bomb Shelter"	Nominated

=== Young Artist Awards ===
Year	Category	Nominee(s)	Result
2001	Best Performance in a TV Comedy Series - Leading Young Actor	Frankie Muniz	Won
2001	Best Performance in a TV Comedy Series - Supporting Young Actor	Craig Lamar Traylor	Won
2001	Best Performance in a TV Comedy Series - Guest Starring Young Performer	Ashley Edner	Nominated
2001	Best Performance in a TV Series (Comedy or Drama) - Young Actor Age Ten or Under	Erik Per Sullivan	Nominated
2001	Best Ensemble in a TV Series (Drama or Comedy)	Frankie Muniz, Justin Berfield, Erik Per Sullivan, Craig Lamar Traylor, Christopher Masterson	Nominated
2002	Best Family TV Comedy Series	–	Won
2002	Best Performance in a TV Comedy Series - Leading Young Actor	Frankie Muniz	Won
2002	Best Performance in a TV Comedy Series - Supporting Young Actor	Craig Lamar Traylor	Nominated
2002	Best Performance in a TV Comedy Series - Guest Starring Young Actor	Bobby Brewer	Nominated
2002	Best Performance in a TV Comedy Series - Guest Starring Young Actress	Brooke Anne Smith	Won
2002	Best Performance in a TV Series (Comedy or Drama) - Young Actor Age Ten or Under	Erik Per Sullivan	Nominated
2002	Best Ensemble in a TV Series (Drama or Comedy)	Frankie Muniz, Justin Berfield, Erik Per Sullivan, Craig Lamar Traylor, Christopher Masterson	Nominated
2003	Best Performance in a TV Series (Comedy or Drama) - Leading Young Actor	Frankie Muniz	Nominated
2003	Best Performance in a TV Series (Comedy or Drama) - Supporting Young Actor	Justin Berfield	Nominated
2003	Best Performance in a TV Comedy Series - Guest Starring Young Actor	Miles Marsico	Nominated
2003	Best Performance in a TV Comedy Series - Guest Starring Young Actress	Lauren Storm	Nominated
2003	Best Ensemble in a TV Series (Comedy or Drama)	Frankie Muniz, Justin Berfield, Erik Per Sullivan, Kyle Sullivan, Craig Lamar Traylor	Won
2004	Most Popular Mom & Pop in a Television Series	Jane Kaczmarek, Bryan Cranston	Nominated
2005	Best Performance in a Television Series - Recurring Young Actor	Cameron Monaghan	Won

=== Peabody Award ===
Year	Category	Nominee(s)	Episode	Result
2000	Area of Excellence	Fox, Satin City, and Regency Television		Won
