= Malcolm in the Middle season 3 =

Malcolm in the Middle
- Season 3
- DVD cover
- Starring: Jane Kaczmarek; Bryan Cranston; Christopher Masterson; Justin Berfield; Erik Per Sullivan; Frankie Muniz
- No. of episodes: 22

Release
- Original network: Fox
- Original release: November 11, 2001 – May 12, 2002

Season chronology
- ← Previous; Season 2 Next → Season 4

The third season of the American television sitcom Malcolm in the Middle premiered on November 11, 2001, on the Fox Network, and ended on May 12, 2002, with a total of twenty-two episodes. The series follows young Malcolm (Frankie Muniz) and his dysfunctional family, including his mother Lois (Jane Kaczmarek), father Hal (Bryan Cranston), older brothers Francis (Christopher Masterson) and Reese (Justin Berfield), and younger brother Dewey (Erik Per Sullivan).

== Cast and characters ==
=== Main ===
- Jane Kaczmarek as Lois
- Bryan Cranston as Hal
- Christopher Kennedy Masterson as Francis
- Justin Berfield as Reese
- Erik Per Sullivan as Dewey
- Frankie Muniz as Malcolm

=== Recurring ===
- Brenda Wehle as Lavernia
- Craig Lamar Traylor as Stevie Kenarban
- David Anthony Higgins as Craig Feldspar
- Daniel von Bargen as Edwin Spangler
- Eric Nenninger as Eric Hanson
- Evan Matthew Cohen as Lloyd
- Kyle Sullivan as Dabney
- Merrin Dungey as Kitty Kenarban
- Tania Raymonde as Cynthia Sanders

=== Guest stars ===
- Shannon Woodward as Tammy ("Houseboat")
- Scott Adsit as Attorney ("Houseboat")
- Edie McClurg as Julie ("Book Club")
- Amy Farrington as Karen ("Book Club" & "Cynthia's Back")
- Jim O'Heir as Roy ("Book Club")
- Alessandra Torresani as Sara Coleman ("Malcolm's Girlfriend")
- Logan O'Brien as Ronnie Demarco ("Malcolm's Girlfriend")
- Cristine Rose as Mrs. Demarco ("Malcolm's Girlfriend")
- Terry Rhoads as Sheriff Chad ("Malcolm's Girlfriend")
- Colin Ferguson as Deputy Brock ("Malcolm's Girlfriend")
- Malcolm David Kelley as Kid #1 ("Malcolm's Girlfriend")
- Charlie Stewart as Kid #2 ("Malcolm's Girlfriend")
- Cloris Leachman as Ida ("Christmas")
- Dan Martin as Malik ("Poker" & "Poker #2")
- Stephen Tobolowsky as Mr. Fisher ("Lois' Makeover")
- Terry Bradshaw as Coach Clarence ("Company Picnic")
- Howie Long as Howie ("Company Picnic")
- Christina Ricci as Kelly ("Company Picnic")
- Tom Green as Steve ("Company Picnic")
- Heidi Klum as Toothless Hockey Player ("Company Picnic")
- Patrick Warburton as Burt Landon ("Company Picnic")
- Lauren Storm as Laurie ("Company Picnic")
- Susan Sarandon as Meg ("Company Picnic")
- Bradley Whitford as Meg's husband ("Company Picnic")
- Stephen Root as John Pratt ("Company Picnic")
- Magic Johnson as Ringer Hockey Player #32 ("Company Picnic")
- Michael Kostroff as Toadie ("Company Picnic")
- Steve Witting as Announcer ("Company Picnic")
- Rheagan Wallace as Jackie ("Reese Drives")
- Mel Rodriguez as Neil ("Reese Drives")
- Wayne Wilderson as Hotel Clerk ("Hal's Birthday")
- Jim Meskimen as Waiter ("Hal's Birthday")
- Dana Davis as Chandra ("Poker #2")
- Lindsey Haun as Kristen ("Poker #2")
- Andy Richter as Dr. Kennedy ("Clip Show")
- George Wyner as Foreman Fred ("Jury Duty")
- Ashley Tisdale as Girl ("Jury Duty")
- Michael Horse as Steve ("Monkey")
- Jesse D. Goins as Officer Smith ("Monkey")

== Episodes ==
Season 3 episodes
No. overall	No. in season	Title	Directed by	Written by	Original release date	Prod. code	U.S. viewers (millions)
42	1	"Houseboat"	Todd Holland	Bob Stevens	November 11, 2001	06-01-301	15.49
Hal gropes a woman in a store after mistaking her for Lois, and Malcolm, trying to impress a girl, refuses to help him and leaves him to get arrested. Malcolm's family and the Kenarbans vacation together on a houseboat. Hal surprises Malcolm with a brand-new fishing pole and they go out fishing. Unable to catch anything, Malcolm finds the experience incredibly boring, especially as Reese and Stevie hang out with sex-starved girls from a nearby cheerleader camp. Just as Malcolm catches a fish and makes amends with Hal, he sees some bikini tops and Reese's shirt float past the boat, causing him to throw Hal overboard and rush the boat to the girls' camp. Dewey has an increasingly bad time, ending with Reese and Stevie abandoning him on a buoy to become severely sunburnt. Meanwhile, Francis' friend, Eric, drops out of Marlin Academy to take a logging job in Alaska and Francis gets himself emancipated so he can join him, incurring Lois' wrath.
43	2	"Emancipation"	Jimmy Simons	Alan J. Higgins	November 14, 2001	06-01-302	8.94
Francis leaves the military academy and comes home a final time before heading out to join Eric in Alaska. However, Lois wants nothing to do with him, leading to a serious fight between her and Hal. Malcolm's new teacher, Mr. Herkabe (Chris Eigeman), sets up a ranking system to pressure the Krelboynes to achieve. They turn against each other until Malcolm develops a scheme to break Herkabe's system, humiliating him in front of the school principal.
44	3	"Book Club"	Todd Holland	Alex Reid	November 18, 2001	06-01-304	13.62
Lois attempts to escape the boys' nightly misbehavior by joining a women's book club, but she soon realizes that it is merely an excuse for the women to socialize—and get drunk. Lois helps them plot against a wealthy PTA mother, Lillian Miller, who seems to handle all her motherly duties with ease while living in luxury. Meanwhile, Hal tries and fails many different ideas to keep the boys in order, and Francis hitches a ride with a trucker who makes him humiliate himself in exchange for the ride.
45	4	"Malcolm's Girlfriend"	Ken Kwapis	Ian Busch	November 28, 2001	06-01-305	8.91
After getting a girlfriend Sara Coleman (Alessandra Torresani, whose face is never shown on camera), Malcolm neglects his family and friends; the family reacts when they find out about her. Dewey uses his new friend's wealth to get the birthday party he's always wanted. Still en route to Alaska, Francis is briefly jailed, but starts to enjoy watching the guards' complicated lives unfold in the style of a soap opera.
46	5	"Charity"	Jeff Melman	Gary Murphy & Neil Thompson	December 2, 2001	06-01-303	12.03
Lois forces the boys into community service to build character. They choose to help out at a church, where they quickly go from trading their own stuff to stealing merchandise and creating a black market. When Hal discovers the boys' black market business, he attempts to make the trip back to the church to return the stuff they had taken and apologize. However, when his car breaks down and the police arrest him, Hal and the boys have an epiphany about their own actions. Francis finally reaches his destination in Alaska only to learn that his new job isn't the easy money-making opportunity he thought, but rather a living hell — the work is gruelling, the accommodations are uncomfortable, the pay is minimal, and his boss Lavernia charges her workers for room and board.
47	6	"Health Scare"	Todd Holland	Dan Kopelman	December 9, 2001	06-01-307	12.89
When news hits that Hal may have a serious illness, Lois becomes meaner than usual as she grounds Malcolm and Reese for drawing mud into the house. They later disobey Lois by going to a party full of girls only to come home in hot water. Meanwhile, Francis has a showdown with the combative Lavernia in Alaska, and Dewey becomes overzealous in taking care of his class' pet hamster.
48	7	"Christmas"	Jeff Melman	Maggie Bandur & Pang-Ni Landrum	December 16, 2001	06-01-306	13.07
As the boys ruin Christmas every year with their antics, Lois finally issues an ultimatum: either the boys behave until Christmas morning or the holiday is canceled. Her ploy works, but the boys realize that she could keep using this threat for every holiday and special occasion and decide they need to teach her a lesson. They draw an obscene picture on the garage wall and tear open their presents on Christmas Eve. However, remorse sets in when the boys realized that Lois bought them the presents they wanted. Meanwhile, Francis spends a torturous Christmas with Grandma Ida in Whitehorse, Yukon and eventually finds a closet full of gifts for the family that she withheld because of petty offenses. He pays her back by hiding stashes of musical Christmas cards (playing "Jingle Bells") inside her apartment before he leaves.
49	8	"Poker"	Ken Kwapis	Michael Borkow	January 6, 2002	06-01-308	11.84
Hal finally gets an invitation to Abe's poker game, but loses miserably. Hal believes that Abe's friends targeted him because of his comparatively boring job. Malcolm clashes with Stevie for filming him in a homework assignment, leading to a poker match between Hal and Abe. With Hal unable to attend the dance class he signed up for with Lois, she takes Reese instead, and so many old women want to dance with him that he starts charging them. He uses the money to buy Dewey a toy and smashes it in front of him. For revenge, Dewey films Reese at the class and plans to show it at school. Lois feels she has a natural talent for dancing, but Dewey's video footage shows otherwise. Francis and his friends are trapped in an Alaskan blizzard fending off cabin fever.
50	9	"Reese's Job"	Todd Holland	Gary Murphy & Neil Thompson	January 20, 2002	06-01-310	11.14
Richie gets Reese a job at a fast-food place, but Reese gets into trouble when his co-workers think he stole money from the cash register. Malcolm finds himself eclipsed by the newest, youngest Krelboyne, Barton, Herkabe's latest attempt to get rid of Malcolm. Barton, Malcolm, and Reese confront Richie about stealing the money, which he denies until his girlfriend walks into the room and reveals the truth not knowing the boys are there. Richie has to agree to several services in exchange for the boys' silence. The next day, Barton's father decides to transfer him to another school where he can be a normal child. Francis helps one of his lodge friends prepare to marry a Russian mail-order bride, but what arrives is not what they expected. Dewey tries to prove himself trustworthy with a goldfish and his parents try to sabotage his efforts by switching the live fish with a dead one, but Dewey keeps switching the dead fish with live ones.
51	10	"Lois' Makeover"	Jeff Melman	Michael Glouberman & Andrew Orenstein	January 27, 2002	06-01-311	13.48
Mortified when she learns that she performs poorly in Lucky Aide secret-shoppers' performance reviews, Lois tries to dress up her appearance. Her work life begins to improve after the makeover, but she removes all the makeup after a man mistakes her for a prostitute. Hal is re-energized after beating the boys at basketball until the boys discover his dirty secret and get their revenge on him. Francis deals with a rat infestation.
52 53	11 12	"Company Picnic"	Todd Holland	Story by : Janae Bakken; Teleplay by : Alan J. Higgins	February 3, 2002	06-01-313 06-01-314	21.45
The family attends Hal's company picnic. Hal tries to avoid his new boss (Stephen Root) because of his bleak history of first impressions. His boss mistakes him for owner of the company Hal works at (Patrick Warburton) and Hal struggles to find the courage to correct him. Malcolm meets an old crush Laurie (Lauren Storm), but learns his feelings are not reciprocated right before they are tied to each other for three hours for a scavenger hunt. Reese befriends his scavenger hunt partner, a fellow bully named George. Francis is caught up in an ice hockey match between the loggers and a female oil-rig crew and bets his teammates' money against them while sabotaging their equipment, knowing that if he wins he can pay off his debts and leave. However, the loggers do win, and Lavernia and the rest of the team tie Francis naked to the zamboni and drag him around the rink as punishment.
54	13	"Reese Drives"	Jeff Melman	Michael Glouberman & Andrew Orenstein	February 10, 2002	06-01-309	13.27
Reese gets his driving learner's permit, but after another student named Jackie makes him miss his turn for a driving test, he steals the Driver's-Ed car and ends up in a chase with the cops. However, he drives back to the driving course and makes a perfect score, impressing Jackie and even surprises his own family. After allegedly throwing eggs on Craig's house, Lois makes Malcolm clean it, but Craig actually framed Malcolm so he could have Malcolm's help to set up his new home cinema. Francis makes several promises to different lodgers in order to fix a hole in the lodge's roof, but when he can't deliver, the angry lodgers come after him.
55	14	"Cynthia's Back"	Ken Kwapis	Maggie Bandur & Pang-Ni Landrum	February 17, 2002	06-01-312	11.93
A moody Cynthia returns from Europe and Malcolm discovers it's because she was hiding a more developed figure. When Reese finds out about this, he tries to date her. Malcolm outsmarts him by asking him Cynthia's name in front of her, which Reese had not bothered to learn. Desperate, he grabs her breasts in a last attempt and Cynthia beats him up. Lois' friend Karen tells her that she kissed Hal on New Year's Eve, but he denies it completely, and Lois realizes that Hal loves her more than she loves him. Dewey helps Hal overcome his fear of kite flying. In Alaska, after his drunken roommates steal a totem pole, Francis looks to it for answers.
56	15	"Hal's Birthday"	Levie Isaacks	Alex Reid	March 3, 2002	06-01-316	13.58
Lois arranges for Francis to come home on Hal's birthday as a surprise, but the real surprise is on everyone else when Francis arrives with a wife, Piama (Emy Coligado). Malcolm, Dewey, and Reese are immediately sent to bed while the arguments rage on with Lois and Francis. The boys sneak off to a hotel with Hal's credit card to start a new life, but are soon caught. The entire family eventually do celebrate Hal's birthday before Francis and Piama return to Alaska.
57	16	"Hal Coaches"	Jeff Melman	Ian Busch	March 10, 2002	06-01-319	14.32
Hal decides to coach Dewey's soccer team and turns them into monsters. When Malcolm and Reese get a computer from their neighbor Ed, they discover his big secret and Reese blackmails him into doing favors for him. However, Ed turns the situation against him when he learns of Reese's infractions at school and finally makes him return the favor. Malcolm starts playing a game called The Virts (a parody of The Sims), where he recreates himself and his family, but gets obsessed when his virtual self repeatedly becomes obese and depressed while his family has more fortunate outcomes. In Alaska, Piama holds Lavernia's pet parakeet hostage and demands better treatment for Francis.
58	17	"Dewey's Dog"	Bob Stevens	Michael Glouberman & Andrew Orenstein	April 7, 2002	06-01-318	12.39
Dewey finds a dog, hides him from his parents, and trains him to attack Malcolm and Reese on command. When Craig comes by to return some dry-cleaning, Dewey holds him hostage. Craig manages to escape but the dog mauls him. Because the dog is gone, Malcolm and Reese torture Dewey as revenge. Hal and Lois go on a date, and neither will admit that they caught Craig's flu. In Alaska, Francis comes face-to-face with his former commandant Spangler, who blames him for not only losing his job at Marlin Academy, but also his desertion. Francis feels sympathy for Spangler and gets him a job at a retirement home that gives him free rein to bully the elderly.
59	18	"Poker #2"	Jeff Melman	Story by : John Bradford Goodman; Teleplay by : Bill Hooper	April 21, 2002	06-01-322	11.93
Hal, Abe, and their poker buddies start to compete over minor issues. Reese sets Stevie up with two popular girls, Chandra (Dana Davis) and Kristen (Lindsey Haun), telling them that Stevie is terminally ill. Malcolm discovers that one of the girls has a handgun and tries to hide it from her. Eric suspects that Piama is having an affair, but Francis finds that Piama was merely talking to her estranged father.
60	19	"Clip Show"	Jamie Babbit	Michael Borkow & Alex Reid	April 28, 2002	06-01-321	13.12
Believing the boys ruined the car, Hal forces them to see a psychiatrist, Dr. Kennedy (Andy Richter) to cure their bad behavior. Soon the three open up and tell him all about their family, which escalates into a big fight between the boys, freaking out the shrink. During the cold opening, Francis tries to fix a clog in his house's sink, almost getting his hand caught in the sink vent.
61	20	"Jury Duty"	Ken Kwapis	Story by : Pang-Ni Landrum & Tom Mason & Dan Danko; Teleplay by : Pang-Ni Landrum	May 1, 2002	06-01-320	5.89
While Malcolm and Reese spend a day exploring a sewer with Dewey and Stevie, they can't stop bragging that they saw Kitty naked over the weekend. Lois serves jury duty for a stolen motorcycle case; and, as she's not allowed to discuss it, Hal and Abe think her case is a high-profile murder case and spend the day proving their own theories about it. Lois forces her fellow jurors, who want to declare the defendant guilty and go home, to properly analyze the case. Francis is trapped with the crew in an ice-fishing shed with a bear outside.
62	21	"Cliques"	Jeff Melman	Michael Borkow	May 5, 2002	06-01-317	10.95
After a chemical mishap, the Krelboynes are forced to join the general school population, while Herkabe serves a temporary job as a coach in gym class. They all find new groups except Malcolm, who gets concerned about a fight between the cliques. All the groups prepare to fight each other until the other students realize that they are in the presence of Krelboynes. They pants the Krelboynes and Malcolm, who are left at the school in their underwear. Upon realizing that their home is on Native American land, Francis and Piama host a casino as a means to pay off Lavernia's debts. When Dewey is stricken with chickenpox, Lois tries to keep him busy with dominoes, but then she forbids Reese to knock them down. Reese tries to keep Hal from knocking them down, because Lois will blame Reese no matter the truth. Dewey cleans up all his dominoes while Hal is at work, so Hal sets them up again to experience for himself. He tries to film the event, but wind from the closing door knocks them down before he starts recording.
63	22	"Monkey"	Ken Kwapis	Dan Kopelman	May 12, 2002	06-01-315	11.94
After knocking out a burglar, Reese believes he has a future in law enforcement, so he instantly begins imposing his brutal rule on the neighborhood. He takes it too far by smashing Lois' car window when she refuses to move it for pedestrians. Hal, who did not even make it out of bed when the burglar broke in, tries unsuccessfully to prove to himself that he can be macho. Dewey is too scared to sleep, keeping Malcolm awake too. Elsewhere, Craig is incapacitated by the injuries sustained from Dewey's dog. Rather than spend his insurance money on a nurse he instead gets a trained capuchin monkey, who tries to murder him until Hal comes to his rescue, which restores Hal's self-worth. Hal happily reads Dewey a bedtime story of his exploits, which helps him and Malcolm finally fall asleep. With the logging work done, Francis is laid off and learns that his home is scheduled for demolition. Piama is reluctant to leave her childhood home until she sees the hefty settlement check. They finally bid farewell to Alaska, leaving Eric behind to hitchhike his way home.

== Production ==
Main cast members Frankie Muniz, Jane Kaczmarek, Bryan Cranston, Christopher Kennedy Masterson, Justin Berfield and Erik Per Sullivan return as Malcolm, Lois, Hal, Francis, Reese and Dewey respectively. The season introduces the recurring character Piama Tananahaakna, with Emy Coligado cast in the role. It is also the final one to feature Eric Hanson, played by Eric Nenninger. The season's parallel plot involving Francis shifts from Marlin Academy to a resort in Alaska. The episode "Clip Show", true to its title, serves as a clip show, incorporating footage from previous episodes presented as flashbacks.

== Release ==
The season premiered on the Fox Network in the United States November 11, 2001, and ended on May 12, 2002, with a total of 22 episodes. The season was released on Region 2 DVD on February 4, 2013, and on Region 4 DVD on September 4, 2013.

== Reception ==
Greg Braxton of Los Angeles Times lauded the season premiere for its comedy, particularly Cranston's performance. For her performance as Meg in the two-parter "Company Picnic", Susan Sarandon was nominated in the Outstanding Guest Actress in a Comedy Series category, but lost to Cloris Leachman.

In 2019, Angelo Delos Trinos of Screen Rant criticized the episode "Cynthia's Back" as being outdated. He said, "While not the worst of its kind, Cynthia's Back suffers from depicting outdated stereotypes about women being too emotional and casual sexual harassment."
