= Malcolm in the Middle season 6 =

Malcolm in the Middle
- Season 6
- DVD cover
- Starring: Jane Kaczmarek; Bryan Cranston; Christopher Masterson; Justin Berfield; Erik Per Sullivan; Frankie Muniz
- No. of episodes: 22

Release
- Original network: Fox
- Original release: November 7, 2004 – May 15, 2005

Season chronology
- ← Previous; Season 5 Next → Season 7

The sixth season of Malcolm in the Middle premiered on November 7, 2004, on Fox, and ended on May 15, 2005, with a total of 22 episodes. Frankie Muniz stars as the title character Malcolm, and he is joined by Jane Kaczmarek, Bryan Cranston, Christopher Kennedy Masterson, Justin Berfield and Erik Per Sullivan.

== Cast and characters ==
=== Main ===
- Jane Kaczmarek as Lois (22 episodes)
- Bryan Cranston as Hal (22 episodes)
- Christopher Kennedy Masterson as Francis (7 episodes)
- Justin Berfield as Reese (22 episodes)
- Erik Per Sullivan as Dewey (22 episodes)
- Frankie Muniz as Malcolm (22 episodes)

=== Recurring ===
- Craig Lamar Traylor as Stevie Kenarban
- Amy Bruckner as Zoe
- Cameron Monaghan as Chad
- Danny McCarthy as Hanson
- David Anthony Higgins as Craig Feldspar
- Emy Coligado as Piama
- Cloris Leachman as Ida

=== Guest stars ===
- Caroline Aaron as Nurse Peterson ("Reese Comes Home")
- Tricia O'Kelley as Mrs. Walsh ("Buseys Run Away")
- Dan Martin as Malik ("Standee")
- Kathy Lamkin as Customer ("Standee")
- Carol Mansell as Customer ("Standee")
- Hayden Panettiere as Jessica ("Pearl Harbor")
- Merrin Dungey as Kitty Kenarban ("Kitty's Back")
- Henry Gibson as Frank Ralston ("Kitty's Back")
- Jeanette Miller as Elderly Woman ("Kitty's Back")
- Derek Waters as Waiter ("Kitty's Back")
- Mitch Silpa as Bartender ("Kitty's Back")
- Art LaFleur as Fred ("Malcolm's Car")
- Bob Koherr as Mike ("Malcolm's Car")
- Rose Abdoo as Margie ("Malcolm's Car")
- Heather McDonald as Nancy ("Malcolm's Car")
- Fredric Lehne as Officer Ridley ("Billboard")
- Sam Anderson as Police Commissioner ("Billboard")
- Ashley Gardner as Wendy ("Billboard")
- Raven Goodwin as Busey #2 ("Dewey's Opera" & "Buseys Take a Hostage")
- Brad Bufanda as Lugar Bob ("Dewey's Opera")
- Thomas Kopache as Vic Feldspar ("Living Will")
- John Ducey as Peter Rubin ("Living Will")
- Mike McShane as Dr. Phelps ("Living Will")
- Travis Van Winkle as Phillip ("Tiki Lounge")
- Leah Pipes as Stephanie Wright ("Tiki Lounge")
- Patrick Bristow as Lloyd ("Chad's Sleepover")
- Mary Gross as Evelyn ("Chad's Sleepover")
- Carla Jimenez as Attendant ("No Motorcycles")
- Dan Butler as Norm ("Butterflies")
- Bess Meisler as Gorga ("Ida's Dance")
- Lorna Raver as Big Kathy ("Ida's Dance")
- Lilyan Chauvin as Marica ("Ida's Dance")
- Markus Flanagan as Frank ("Motivational Speaker")
- Michael Kagan as Cop ("Motivational Speaker")
- Bob Glouberman as Gerry ("Motivational Speaker")
- Dee Dee Rescher as Flora ("Motivational Speaker")
- Timothy Stack as Sam ("Stilts")
- Sam Lloyd as Jim ("Buseys Take a Hostage")
- Jennette McCurdy as Penelope ("Buseys Take a Hostage")
- Julia Campbell as Donna ("Mrs. Tri-County")
- Fred Applegate as Dr. Dave ("Mrs. Tri-County")
- Cindy Ambuehl as Darlene Fisher ("Mrs. Tri-County")
- Carolyn Seymour as Nina ("Mrs. Tri-County")
- Deborah May as Betty ("Mrs. Tri-County")
- Kirsten Nelson as Jeanie ("Mrs. Tri-County")

== Episodes ==
Season 6 episodes
No. overall	No. in season	Title	Directed by	Written by	Original release date	Prod. code	U.S. viewers (millions)
108	1	"Reese Comes Home"	Todd Holland	Matthew Carlson	November 7, 2004	06-04-602	7.11
Reese, as soon as he parachutes into Afghanistan, panics and deserts the Army. He hides as a local Muslim woman but accidentally gets married. Winding up alone and dehydrated in the desert, he hallucinates the mascot "Mr. Waffles" giving him a motivational speech, then uses various means of transportation to wander the Middle East. Lois, having recovered from her mental breakdown, receives Reese's file from Sergeant Hendrix after impressing him with her methods of punishing children, then travels to Kabul, selling the family car to afford the trip and hiring locals to help find her son. She ultimately finds him in a small town in India. Malcolm volunteers at a veterans' hospital to alleviate his guilt of making Reese leave but accidentally causes a fight among the elderly veterans. Reese reunites with his brothers as they play a prank on rapping grandmothers.
109	2	"Buseys Run Away"	Bryan Cranston	Michael Glouberman	November 14, 2004	06-04-601	9.06
After learning that Dewey will be leaving their class, the Buseys run away and hide in the trees near his house, forcing Dewey to look after their needs. The unemployed Hal becomes the leader of a group of dimwitted bodybuilders by teaching them basic life skills, and they do favors for him in return. Dewey discovers that Lois treats him kindly as long as he stays out of trouble. Malcolm and Reese suspect that the special treatment means Dewey is informing on them, so they try to entrap him, but they are punished even more when Lois overhears their plans. Ultimately, the bodybuilders accidentally find the Buseys, and Dewey takes pity on the Buseys by faking a tantrum to ensure he stays in the special-needs class.
110	3	"Standee"	David D'Ovidio	Rob Ulin	November 21, 2004	06-04-603	7.06
Lois gets her job back at Lucky Aide (albeit on probation), and fights against Malcolm over a malt liquor standee featuring a goofy black janitor named Slappy. Meanwhile, Hal wages a trash-dumping war with his favorite garbageman after refusing to pick up a large scratching post for cats.
111	4	"Pearl Harbor"	Peter Lauer	Neil Thompson	December 5, 2004	06-04-606	7.78
Jessica returns to wreak havoc on Malcolm's family. This time, she tricks Malcolm and Reese into thinking both of them are closeted homosexuals. Meanwhile, Hal competes with his neighbors over lawn decorations, and Dewey does a report on Hal being his hero.
112	5	"Kitty's Back"	Peter Lauer	Matthew Carlson	December 12, 2004	06-04-604	9.50
Stevie's mother, Kitty (Merrin Dungey) returns after months of debauchery, and Lois calls her out on abandoning her son and husband. Meanwhile, Malcolm helps Stevie record his acceptance speech and edit it to make it sound like Stevie is speaking normally, and Reese gets an all-over sunburn so he can peel off every inch of his skin.
113	6	"Hal's Christmas Gift"	David Grossman	Alex Reid	December 19, 2004	06-04-605	4.67
Hal and Lois are strapped for cash as Christmas approaches. Things get even worse when the now unemployed and broke Francis and Piama decide to come home for the holiday, and Lois gets into a car-crashing war with a woman. As a result, they decide that the Christmas gifts will have to be homemade this year. When the family makes much better gifts than Hal, he promises them that he's going to take them somewhere wonderful and drives around aimlessly looking for somewhere that's as amazing as he claims. Malcolm feels excluded when Reese and Dewey have fun together.
114	7	"Hal Sleepwalks"	David D'Ovidio	Gary Murphy	January 16, 2005	06-04-607	5.35
Hal gets so stressed out over finding a 20th anniversary present for Lois that he starts losing sleep, which prompts Reese to try to brainwash his semiconscious father. A school bully nominates two of Dewey's classmates for student body president, and Dewey nominates the bully, sparking a bizarre three-way election battle. Malcolm takes up the electric guitar despite Lois' warnings that he will fail at it.
115	8	"Lois Battles Jamie"	Steve Welch	Michael Glouberman	January 23, 2005	06-04-608	5.24
Lois begins to think she is losing her touch in discipling Jamie — until she remembers that she had the same problem with Francis when he was a child. Meanwhile, Malcolm, Dewey, and Reese try to find something to do with a discarded diving board.
116	9	"Malcolm's Car"	Peter Lauer	Alex Reid	January 30, 2005	06-04-610	5.93
When Malcolm spots a decrepit 1968 Plymouth Barracuda V8 in his neighborhood on sale, he instantly falls in love with it and purchases the car. He becomes so obsessed with restoring it that he ignores his friends, then becomes trapped within the car and nearly succumbs to carbon monoxide poisoning. Hal stumbles upon his hidden talent for hairstyling and winds up operating a small-scale salon within his house. Craig tells Lois he is taking time off to tutor his boss Fred's wife in golf, but Lois finds out he is actually having an affair with her.
117	10	"Billboard"	Bryan Cranston	Rob Ulin	February 13, 2005	06-04-609	5.43
When Lois catches the boys vandalizing a billboard for a strip club, Malcolm spins the vandalism into a women's rights protest, which sparks a colossal media circus. After Hal grants a TV interview, a woman from his past turns up at the faux protest to demand that he repay a loan from years earlier. Reese falls asleep and dreams of the stripper in giant form telling him she is not real; inspired, he wakes up to give an impassioned speech about the objectification of women, while Lois tries to find a way to get the boys down without creating a wrath in front of the media. Eventually, Lois lies to the press that Dewey has a serious medical condition, and the police make them come down.
118	11	"Dewey's Opera"	Linwood Boomer	Eric Kaplan	February 20, 2005	06-04-611	6.49
When Lois buys a brand-new king-sized bed, Hal thinks that her motive is to put more distance between them and refuses to sleep in it. Moved to tears by an opera he sees on television, Dewey is inspired to write his own operatic masterpiece based on his parents' quarrels, "The Marriage Bed", which is turned into a school production. Malcolm and Reese build their own street luge board and Malcolm gets into a feud with a mystery rider who keeps forcing him off the road. When he makes a bet against the mysterious street luger, he is horrified to learn that it is Stevie and loses his bet. However, Stevie breaks both his arms in an accident. Jamie has his first crush on a girl his age living in a house across from his family's, but the girl becomes attracted to another boy. When the family attends Dewey's opera, Jamie then forms a crush on another toddler girl.
119	12	"Living Will"	Steve Love	Jennifer Celotta	March 6, 2005	06-04-612	5.32
The indecisive Hal is named executor of his neighbour's living will and must decide whether to keep him on life support or pull the plug. The stress of making this life-or-death decision induces a psychosomatic paralysis of his upper body. However, Lois snaps Hal out of it when she reminds him that he made a good decision once by marrying her instead of Susan, leading Hal to uncover a third option. Craig asks the boys to teach him how to fight dirty since a bully from his childhood is coming back to town, which is revealed to be his own father, Mr. Victor Feldspar.
120	13	"Tiki Lounge"	Peter Lauer	Jay Kogen	March 13, 2005	06-04-613	5.58
When Hal and Lois realize how little time they spend together, Hal turns the garage into a private tiki lounge where he and Lois can retreat. Things go smoothly until they feud over philosophical beliefs, eventually stressing out in the lounge. Herkabe cons Malcolm into joining the Booster Club, where he learns a lesson about taking one for the team, which helps him to reconcile Lois and Hal. Worried over having two geniuses in the family teaming up against him and believing that Jamie has the same intelligence as him, Reese suggests they team up.
121	14	"Ida Loses a Leg"	Steve Welch	Andy Bobrow	March 20, 2005	06-04-614	5.23
During Grandma Ida's unwelcome visit with the family, she loses her leg while saving Dewey from a moving truck. Consumed with guilt, Dewey is determined to find Ida's leg and give it the proper burial. Francis begrudgingly becomes Ida's caretaker at Lois' admonition. He soon learns that not only do they both despise Lois, but she was responsible for leaving him at his grandmother's house. Malcolm and Reese get a new idea for a prank that forces them to stay awake for days on end to avoid the embarrassment of having their faces glued to the floor.
122	15	"Chad's Sleepover"	David D'Ovidio	Rob Ulin	March 27, 2005	06-04-615	4.13
After Hal forbids Dewey from inviting his peculiar classmate Chad over for a sleepover, Dewey goes over Hal's head and asks Lois instead. Meanwhile, Malcolm and Reese find out that they are not as popular as they once thought, and plot "revenge" on their classmates, Lois searches for the warranty papers on her 10-year-old blender that she wishes to return for minor infractions, and Hal tries to keep Lois (and anyone else in the family) from finding a nude photo of Lois he took when they tried to have sex, but were too drunk to initiate it, leading to Lois passing out before Hal.
123	16	"No Motorcycles"	Jimmy Simons	Andy Bobrow	April 3, 2005	06-04-618	4.15
When Francis and Piama choose to celebrate Francis' 21st birthday at the house, Hal is reminded of a promise he made to a young Francis after missing his son's play, involving a motorcycle trip. Hal and Francis sneak off and have a great time until it emerges that Francis has been attending Alcoholics Anonymous meetings, upsetting Hal, who is reminded of just how much he's missed out on. Meanwhile, Lois and Piama finally start bonding over their anger towards their husbands, especially since Hal and Francis broke Lois' "No Motorcycles" rule while Malcolm, Dewey, and Reese are held captive in their own home by a bully who wants to beat one of them up.
124	17	"Butterflies"	David Grossman	Michael Glouberman	April 10, 2005	06-04-616	4.91
Malcolm discovers a homeless man named Norm (Dan Butler) living in the Lucky Aide. He agrees to keep Norm's secret as long as he provides Malcolm with tidbits on his new crush Wendy, a fellow Lucky Aide employee, until Lois finds out. Malcolm reveals too much information to the girl, making her think that he is stalking her. When Reese takes a job as an exterminator, he quickly learns that, to drum up business, he must infest the neighbors' lawns with caterpillars. He has a change of heart and begins to nurture them, only to be overwhelmed when they turn into butterflies and swarm on him.
125	18	"Ida's Dance"	Steve Welch	Eric Kaplan	April 17, 2005	06-04-619	4.43
Lois goes over to visit Ida, thinking she may have dementia due to an odd phone call, but gets unpleasantly surprised by the "St. Grotus Day festival", where Ida and her elderly friends make Lois miserable. Meanwhile, Dewey helps Malcolm with his music appreciation class, and Hal and Reese bond over horror movies.
126	19	"Motivational Speaker"	Steve Love	Rob Ulin	April 24, 2005	06-04-620	5.77
Reese begins hanging out with a pack of dogs who think of him as their new alpha leader. Meanwhile, Dewey gets in trouble with Lois after she finds out that he is seeing another mom, and attempts to get her back with a huge tattoo on his chest, and Hal accidentally becomes a motivational speaker for his co-workers, but drops it when he motivates a man, Gerry (Bob Glouberman) into taking over his job.
127	20	"Stilts"	Linwood Boomer	Michael Glouberman	May 1, 2005	06-04-622	6.84
After Lois and Hal are reminded of the tight budget they must uphold, Hal discovers one of the boys has been dialing a 1-900 number. His attempt to explain the error to the hotline's billing department turns awry when he forgets to hang up the phone one evening and finds out about it in the morning, incurring a whopping $800 charge ($1,319 in 2025). Meanwhile, Reese takes a job at a research clinic that pays him to take experimental pills and regrets it when he steals a police horse, Malcolm takes on a humiliating job at the Lucky Aide as a costumed Uncle Sam on stilts, and runs afoul of a drunk man (Timothy Stack) who used to be the Lucky Aide Uncle Sam, and Dewey discovers that Jamie is finding old jewelry Francis hid from Lois, until he discovers that Jamie is stealing jewelry from a neighbor's house.
128	21	"Buseys Take a Hostage"	David D'Ovidio	Gary Murphy	May 8, 2005	06-04-621	4.89
When Hal decides to attend his first annual Neighborhood Association meeting with Malcolm, he is strongly encouraged to take on the role of President. Malcolm sees a perfect opportunity to add some excitement to the community, but is soon appalled when he learns of Hal's authoritarian agenda. Meanwhile, Francis takes on a new job as a camp activities coordinator and turns to Dewey for his input on some creative new games, only for Dewey to discover the games are actually for kids with intellectual disabilities and emotional problems, the Busey kids hold their teacher hostage after realizing that they shouldn't depend on Dewey for everything, and Reese studies for his finals, only to fail all of them so badly that he can't make it up in summer school.
129	22	"Mrs. Tri-County"	David D'Ovidio	Gary Murphy	May 15, 2005	06-04-617	5.16
The boys enter Lois in the Mrs. Tri-County Pageant as a joke. When they overhear the other contestants remarking that Lois doesn't have a chance of winning, they plot to help their mother take the crown. Meanwhile, Malcolm is blackmailed into delivering love notes to a contestant for Herkabe and Reese discovers that, according to the Mrs. Tri-County pageant handbook, he has the good looks of a middle-aged woman, only to be heartbroken that he can't enter the competition because he's a teenage boy.

== Production ==
In April 2004, Fox renewed Malcolm in the Middle for a sixth season. Main cast members Frankie Muniz, Jane Kaczmarek, Bryan Cranston, Christopher Kennedy Masterson, Justin Berfield and Erik Per Sullivan return as Malcolm, Lois, Hal, Francis, Reese and Dewey respectively. Masterson made fewer appearances in the season, and it was written into the storyline that he has been fired from the ranch he joined in season four.

== Release ==
=== Broadcast history ===
The season premiered on November 7, 2004, on Fox, and ended on May 15, 2005, with a total of 22 episodes.

=== Home media ===
The season was released on Region 2 DVD on May 27, 2013, and on Region 4 DVD on September 4, 2013.

== Reception ==
John Leonard of New York wrote, "[T]hose of you who have followed Malcolm to a military academy, a dude ranch, and Afghanistan, through jury duty, hangovers, shoplifting, book clubs, hot tubs, and Oliver North, ought to know better than to doubt for a second the savage savvy of Lois in her solitary splendor. All in one, she is Mother Jones, Mother Courage, Mother Goose, Mother Superior—and Pol Pot." At the 57th Primetime Emmy Awards, the song "The Marriage Bed" that was written by Eric Kaplan and composed by Charles Sydnor for the episode "Dewey's Opera" was nominated for the Primetime Emmy Award for Outstanding Music and Lyrics. In the same ceremony, Kaczmarek was nominated for Outstanding Lead Actress in a Comedy Series, and Cloris Leachman for Outstanding Guest Actress In A Comedy Series.

In 2019, Angelo Delos Trinos of Screen Rant included the episode "Pearl Harbor" in his list, "10 Episodes Of Malcolm in the Middle That Aged Poorly". He wrote, "It’s not the show’s worst foray into risqué territory, but Pearl Harbor really belongs in 2004 when it first aired." In 2020, Ricky Fernandes da Conceição of Goomba Stomp named "Reese Comes Home", "Pearl Harbor", "Dewey’s Opera" and "Billboard" as among the "30 Best Episodes of Malcolm in the Middle".
