= Malcolm in the Middle season 4 =

Season of television series

Malcolm in the Middle
- Season 4
- DVD cover
- Starring: Jane Kaczmarek; Bryan Cranston; Christopher Masterson; Justin Berfield; Erik Per Sullivan; Frankie Muniz
- No. of episodes: 22

Release
- Original network: Fox
- Original release: November 3, 2002 – May 18, 2003

Season chronology
- ← Previous; Season 3 Next → Season 5

The fourth season of Malcolm in the Middle premiered on November 3, 2002, on Fox, and ended on May 18, 2003, with a total of 22 episodes. Frankie Muniz stars as the title character Malcolm, and he is joined by Jane Kaczmarek, Bryan Cranston, Christopher Kennedy Masterson, Justin Berfield and Erik Per Sullivan.

== Cast and characters ==
=== Main ===
- Jane Kaczmarek as Lois (18 episodes)
- Bryan Cranston as Hal (22 episodes)
- Christopher Kennedy Masterson as Francis (21 episodes)
- Justin Berfield as Reese (22 episodes)
- Erik Per Sullivan as Dewey (22 episodes)
- Frankie Muniz as Malcolm (21 episodes)

=== Recurring ===
- Kenneth Mars as Otto
- Emy Coligado as Piama
- David Anthony Higgins as Craig Feldspar
- Craig Lamar Traylor as Stevie Kenarban
- Reagan Dale Neis as Nikki
- Evan Matthew Cohen as Lloyd
- Cloris Leachman as Ida
- Meagen Fay as Gretchen
- Kyle Sullivan as Dabney
- Brittany Finamore as Alison

=== Guest stars ===
- Tim DeKay as Matt ("Zoo")
- Daniel Roebuck as Zoo Worker Randy ("Zoo")
- Theo Rossi as Senior ("Humilithon")
- Jordan Masterson as Student #2 ("Humilithon")
- Vanessa Lee Chester as Student #3 ("Humilithon")
- Christopher Lloyd as Walter ("Family Reunion")
- Brenda Strong as Amelia ("Family Reunion")
- Mehcad Brooks as Big Kid ("Stupid Girl")
- Timm Sharp as Dean ("Forbidden Girlfriend")
- Oscar Nunez as Ranch Hand ("Forbidden Girlfriend" & "Academic Octathalon")
- Michael Shamus Wiles as Boyd ("Forbidden Girlfriend" & "Kicked Out")
- Blue Deckert as Earl ("Forbidden Girlfriend")
- Jack McGee as Coach Oleski ("Malcolm Holds His Tongue")
- David Rasche as Lawyer ("Grandma Sues")
- Lisa Foiles as Mallory ("If Boys Were Girls")
- Jennette McCurdy as Daisy ("If Boys Were Girls")
- Lester "Rasta" Speight as Samuel ("Long Drive")
- Dan Martin as Malik ("Long Drive" & "Baby: Parts 1 & 2")
- Sam Lerner as Patrick ("Kicked Out")
- Hayden Panettiere as Jessica ("Stereo Store")
- Gregg Binkley as Randy ("Stereo Store")
- Jeremy Howard as Ethan ("Stereo Store")
- Joel Murray as Larry ("Hal's Friend")
- Beth Grant as Dorene Hooper ("Hal's Friend")
- Tucker Smallwood as Baffert ("Academic Octathalon")
- Nick Wechsler as Donnie ("Reese's Party")
- Danielle Panabaker as Kathy McCulskey ("Reese's Party")
- Jason Alexander as Leonard ("Future Malcolm")
- Vernee Watson-Johnson as Gloria ("Future Malcolm")
- Brian Stepanek as Stan ("Baby: Part 1")
- Nancy Lenehan as Helen ("Day Care")

== Episodes ==
Season 4 episodes
No. overall	No. in season	Title	Directed by	Written by	Original release date	Prod. code	U.S. viewers (millions)
64	1	"Zoo"	Todd Holland	Michael Glouberman & Andrew Orenstein	November 3, 2002	06-02-401	12.21
Malcolm is depressed, and the family goes to the zoo. Reese battles a goat, while Malcolm and Dewey end up in a tiger pit. Dewey calms Malcolm long enough for Reese to save them by tossing the goat in the tiger pit. This experience makes Malcolm see his life in a whole new light. Lois' ex-boyfriend, Matt (Tim DeKay), works at the zoo and his demonstration of a tarantula on Hal results in Hal getting a nasty bite. While Hal recovers, Matt inadvertently reveals to him that Lois actually had a third boyfriend, leading to a serious confrontation between Hal and Lois. Francis and Piama's road trip across America results in them meeting a German couple named Otto (Kenneth Mars) and Gretchen (Meagen Fay) who offer Francis a job at their dude ranch, the Grotto.
65	2	"Humilithon"	Jeff Melman	Michael Borkow	November 10, 2002	06-02-402	9.64
Malcolm's first day of high school gets off to a bad start when Lois embarrasses him in front of the entire school, causing him to have no friends except the Krelboynes. He tries to commit an offense that would make Lois send him to military school, but Cynthia warns him that if he does so, she will 'never have sex with him again', lying and sacrificing her own reputation to restore his. Lois and Hal volunteer in the school, where Hal clashes with Mr. Herkabe. With Malcolm and Reese away, Dewey stays home alone for the first time in his life and has a wonderful time. On the ranch, Francis is overwhelmed with the workload due to Otto constantly allowing his employees to take extended vacations. Just when he is about to quit, Otto gifts him a truck, persuading him to stay.
66	3	"Family Reunion"	Ken Kwapis	Alex Reid	November 17, 2002	06-02-403	10.92
Francis and Piama visit just as the family goes to Hal's family reunion for his father's birthday, and Hal's family makes Lois miserable because she is from a lower-class family. Hal, Piama and the boys are furious for this and plot revenge on the family. Hal clashes with his father, Walter (Christopher Lloyd), and forces a confession from him by tickling him. The boys drive a golf cart over the celebration with the help of their younger cousins, destroying the party, and incurring the wrath of the adults. Even though Hal and Lois pretend to be angry at the boys, they are both proud of them for standing up to the family. Lois also finally starts treating Piama kindly, not wanting to turn out like her own in-laws.
67	4	"Stupid Girl"	Todd Holland	Dan Kopelman	November 24, 2002	06-02-404	9.82
Malcolm pretends to be stupid so he can win over a cute girl named Alison (Brittany Finamore) who really is stupid and soon finds that he is actually becoming dumber. Stevie wins Lois' approval and she takes him to the school dance. Hal rents a steamroller and becomes addicted to running over various objects until Dewey brings him back to his senses by standing in front of it. Meanwhile, Francis saves Otto from being conned by a con-artist selling him cow sunscreen.
68	5	"Forwards Backwards"	Levie Isaacks	Maggie Bandur	December 1, 2002	06-02-406	10.71
Days before Malcolm's birthday, he and Reese pull increasingly severe pranks against each other. Flashbacks throughout the episode gradually reveal how their feud began when Malcolm ate a blueberry Reese was saving. Dewey worries about his role as Abraham Lincoln in the school play and takes Lois' advice to imagine a set of parents, leading to a memorable performance. Hal enlists Craig to help him find Malcolm a birthday present, but is driven crazy by his constant demands. Although Craig calls off the deal, he rescues Hal from buying a bad comic book and forces the owner into negotiations. The comic book and all of Malcolm's presents end up going to Dewey as compensation for missing his play, due to Hal and Lois having to ground both Reese and Malcolm for their pranks. Meanwhile, Francis and Otto encounter a "devil cow" at the ranch and Francis discovers it is just an ordinary cow long overdue for milking.
69	6	"Forbidden Girlfriend"	Jamie Babbit	Matthew Carlson	December 15, 2002	06-02-405	11.19
Malcolm starts to date Nikki (Reagan Dale Neis), a girl from his school that he tutors in his free time. It becomes increasingly complicated to manage their alibis and avoid her dad who dislikes him. Hal and Lois cannot have sex for a week while Lois takes an antibiotic regimen. They find new energy to care for the kids and improve the house, but have a hard time staying apart. At the ranch, Otto is furious with a neighboring ranch repeatedly destroying the fences that Francis has built to keep the horses inside, so that their own cattle can reach water. In the end, Francis proposes simply adding a gate in the fence.
70	7	"Malcolm Holds His Tongue"	Jeff Melman	Gary Murphy & Neil Thompson	January 5, 2003	06-02-410	10.45
Malcolm decides to keep his opinions to himself, but he becomes so repressed that he is hospitalized with a peptic ulcer. Reese must enlist Craig to drive him and his girlfriend, Alison, to a concert. When Reese learns that Craig wants to go on a hayride date and will not let him renege, Alison ditches Reese to go to the concert alone, and he is forced to spend the evening with Craig. Hal starts practicing race-walking, and ends up having talents for it, until he makes a fierce rival, Wheeler. Hal makes a run at beating this "common jogger", after learning Wheeler's dirty secret. Francis receives an expensive pair of boots from Hal and, over Piama's objections, soaks them in water and wears them for days on end to make them fit perfectly.
71	8	"Boys at Ranch"	David D'Ovidio	Gary Murphy & Neil Thompson	January 12, 2003	06-02-412	10.36
Hal and the boys visit Francis at the ranch. Everyone is shocked to find that Francis is a lot different from whom they remember. As Hal laments that the ranch succeeded where he failed in instilling responsibility in Francis, the boys try to restore Francis to his old self by revealing a secret stash full of rockets and fireworks. Hal and Otto get drunk and end up stranded in the desert during the night. The boys set off the fireworks, helping to rescue Otto and Hal but blinding themselves.
72	9	"Grandma Sues"	Jimmy Simons	Michael Glouberman & Andrew Orenstein	February 2, 2003	06-02-407	13.72
Francis and Piama visit the family the same day Grandma Ida's last day of visit. However, Grandma Ida is injured by slipping on leaves Reese neglected to rake up, and she sues Lois and Hal – just when Lois discovers that she is pregnant. To make matters worse, she hires an expensive lawyer and sues for a vast sum. This turns to horror when their insurance company cancels their policy via a loophole, which could lead to Ida evicting them from their own home and taking all of their belongings due to them not being able to afford the out-of-pocket costs. The boys band together with Piama in support for Hal and Lois. However, upon learning that the family has no insurance, the lawyer refuses to aid Ida (since he will not make but pennies off of the settlement), who immediately decides to leave before she can be kicked out.
73	10	"If Boys Were Girls"	Ken Kwapis	Story by : Alexandra Kaczenski; Teleplay by : Nahnatchka Khan	February 9, 2003	06-02-408	11.70
Hal asks Lois what sex she would like her new baby to be, but they are interrupted by the boys fighting. Exasperated, Lois imagines life with daughters instead of sons, with Reese as Renee (Mimi Paley), Malcolm as Mallory (Lisa Foiles), and Dewey as Daisy (Jennette McCurdy). The fantasy also depicts Hal as an obese, weak-willed secret smoker who is easily manipulated by the girls. Though the fantasy starts pleasantly at home and at a local mall, Lois soon discovers the potential problems with raising girls: Renee is promiscuous and pregnant by Mallory's crush, Mallory is an egotist who secretly uses diet pills, and Daisy excels at manipulation. Francis's counterpart Frances (Christopher Kennedy Masterson in drag with a modulated voice) then arrives, having rebelled against Lois, left college, and married a middle-aged deadbeat. The girls gang up and blame Lois for their problems, as the boys had done earlier, making Lois realize that girls are as difficult to raise as boys are. In the real world, Hal desperately searches the mall for the perfect Valentine's Day present for Lois and settles for a baby's outfit. Though the boys thoughtfully buy a heart-shaped candy box, Lois still wishes for the new baby to be a girl.
74	11	"Long Drive"	Levie Isaacks	Michael Borkow	March 2, 2003	06-02-409	11.52
Reese is sent to prison for a day as part of a "Scared Straight" program for troublemaking kids, where he clashes with a wrestler imprisoned for beating a man to death. Meanwhile, Lois takes Malcolm (who's been sneaking around with his girlfriend from "Forbidden Girlfriend") on a lengthy drive to her sister's house, during which she tells him everything about sex and relationships; Dewey dissolves Hal's band by planting seeds of doubt among the members; and Francis tries to cover up the fact that he accidentally killed Otto's favorite cow and turned it into his dinner.
75	12	"Kicked Out"	Jeff Melman	Alex Reid	March 9, 2003	06-02-413	11.73
A combination of Malcolm's disgust at the house falling apart around them, and Hal's fear-induced "zero tolerance" attempts at maintaining peace and order in the family, results in Malcolm being kicked out of the house. The longer he has no home, the more his sanity begins to slip away. Hal finds Malcolm at his ex-girlfriend's house and agrees to keep this between them, knowing that Lois would have gone through greater lengths to find him. At the ranch, Otto's family arrives and Francis has to deal with Otto's piano-playing nephew who intentionally annoys him, which leads to him smashing his piano in front of Otto's family. Reese attaches a fire hose to his back for more speed on his bike, which ends in a disaster.
76	13	"Stereo Store"	Bryan Cranston	Matthew Carlson	March 16, 2003	06-02-414	10.96
Hal gets a second job at "U-Buy It," and tries to fit in with the younger workers. Meanwhile, Jessica (Hayden Panettiere), a girl from Malcolm's school, babysits Malcolm, Reese, and Dewey while Hal works the night shift, and she ends up humiliating them in front of her friends, and a film crew picks The Grotto to shoot their new movie, but when Francis recognizes one of the actresses from a porno he saw (and sees signs that the film crew is for an X-rated movie), he must hide the truth from Gretchen and Otto.
77	14	"Hal's Friend"	Jeff Melman	Dan Kopelman	March 30, 2003	06-02-415	11.10
Hal meets with an old high-school friend, Larry (Joel Murray), who has not changed in all the time since they have seen each other. Hal claims Lois believes Larry is a horrible influence on him, which is proven right when Hal and Larry accidentally knock down the bedroom wall. Malcolm and Stevie convince their Krelboyne friend Dabney to become more independent from his overprotective mother. Dewey manipulates Reese to do favors for him by pretending Lois is giving Reese orders through the phone. Meanwhile, whilst Piama and Gretchen are on vacation for the weekend, Otto stays with Francis in his bed but to Francis' horror, Otto screams uncontrollably in his sleep.
78	15	"Garage Sale"	Levie Isaacks	Maggie Bandur	April 6, 2003	06-02-416	10.18
Home from a visit with her sister, Susan, who had called her "hopeless," Lois puts Reese in charge of the family garage sale to build his character, but he gets carried away with the authority. When Reese sells Dewey's piggy bank that had $16 inside it for a fraction of said money, and Lois refuses to do anything about it, Dewey takes revenge on the family by selling all the valuable items inside the house (TV, stereo, bookshelf, etc.) Hal finds his old pirate radio transmitter and restarts the station he ran in college under the pseudonym Kid Charlemagne. However, he ends up in trouble with the FCC. Malcolm finds an old computer worth thousands of dollars and arranges to sell it to Craig. At the last second, Hal pulls Craig away to help continue transmitting his radio show, and Reese intentionally destroys the computer. After learning how much the computer was worth, Lois severely punishes Reese for his behavior. At the ranch, Otto becomes more and more depressed whilst dealing with his estrangement from his son, Rutger, worrying Francis and Gretchen dearly. Note: This is the first appearance of Lois after a three episode absence.
79	16	"Academic Octathalon"	Todd Holland	Rob Hanning	April 13, 2003	06-02-411	9.25
Mr. Herkabe forces Malcolm to join the academic octathlon team in an expensive hotel, but soon discovers a cheating conspiracy. Meanwhile, Dewey alienates Hal after Hal tells him he is too big for their bedtime ritual, Reese tries to bail out of going to the dance with his girlfriend so he can save money on a leather jacket, and Francis and Piama decide not to get into any more petty squabbles, but their lack of arguing causes other couples to fight.
80	17	"Clip Show 2"	Levie Isaacks	Maggie Bandur and Dan Kopelman	April 20, 2003	06-02-422	8.69
Hal and Lois are penning their will, and think back to all the trouble their sons put them through. Hal forewarned against making out the will because he and Lois are not equipped for the task and wanted to go to a professional to make out the will. Lois' history with Francis is finally revealed and how her inability to admit when she is wrong lead to a lot of the problems the family has been dealing with.
81	18	"Reese's Party"	Levie Isaacks	Andy Bobrow	April 27, 2003	06-02-418	11.07
Reese decides to throw a party while Lois and Hal take a last weekend getaway before the baby is born. Unfortunately, he invites Francis' friend Donnie and his gang, on the same night that Malcolm had planned a romantic dinner with his new girlfriend Kathy (Danielle Panabaker), and they turn the party into a crystal meth operation. When Francis fails to blackmail Donnie into leaving, Dewey solves the situation by tattling on the delinquents to their mothers. Hal and Lois have a miserable time at the honeymoon hotel after it is revealed that Hal lied to Lois about him getting a vasectomy.
82	19	"Future Malcolm"	Ken Kwapis	Story by : Ron Corcillo & A.J. Poulin; Teleplay by : Michael Glouberman & Andrew Orenstein	May 4, 2003	06-02-417	12.11
At the park, Malcolm meets a depressed middle-aged man named Leonard (Jason Alexander) who has much in common with him. Fearing that this might be his future self, Malcolm tries to help Leonard to improve his life. Lois cannot understand why she is gaining weight in spite of her dieting attempts. Dewey keeps playing stunts, using the excuse that the baby "told" him to. Lois is about to punish him, saying the baby is not talking to him, when Dewey tells her the baby "says" to look behind her, revealing Hal has deliberately been making her gain weight (finding her growing curves arousing). Francis gets a swelled ego when he and Piama find employment as nude models.
83	20	"Baby (Part 1)"	Jimmy Simons	Rob Hanning	May 11, 2003	06-02-419	9.82
Hal and the boys spend the day at a bridal exposition (which Hal had mistaken for a car exposition). Reese is lent a tuxedo by a vendor; he enjoys how much nicer he is treated so much that he refuses to return it. Dewey enlists several people at the convention to humiliate Hal by publicly announcing that the baby's planned delivery date is his birthday. Malcolm has been accepted to a prestigious boarding school in England, but Hal forbids him to go because the family cannot function without him. Ida moves in after her apartment burns down and she refuses to stay with Susan. Knowing that Ida has a fear of black people, Francis, Lois, and Piama enlist Abe and his poker buddies to help scare Ida out of the house, but she decides to stay when Lois' water breaks. Upon receiving a phone call from Lois, Hal and the boys rush to the car park, but they are detained by security for prior offenses.
84	21	"Baby (Part 2)"	Jamie Babbit	Michael Borkow	May 18, 2003	06-02-420	10.83
A frantic Hal crashes the car while trying to get home to Lois. Reese, Malcolm, and Dewey take a parenting class to be better brothers to their new sibling, but realize everything they were taught in the class is the opposite of what their parents did for them. Piama and Lois trick Susan and Ida into making amends to get Ida to leave. Francis is forced to help Lois give birth when the paramedics do not arrive in time. They manage to deliver the baby, who is named Jamie.
85	22	"Day Care"	Steve Love	Gary Murphy & Neil Thompson	May 18, 2003	06-02-421	10.48
A church-run daycare center accepts Lois' wailing newborn, but it comes at a price. Not only must Reese, Malcolm, and Dewey attend Bible-study classes, but Hal and Lois are expected to take part in the church community. Malcolm and Dewey both hate it, Hal bonds well with the church members, Reese accepts God, and Lois has an epiphany about being a terrible mother to her own children. Meanwhile, a rival ranch reports an alien sighting, so Francis fabricates a sighting on Otto's ranch, which gets him arrested.

== Production ==
Main cast members Frankie Muniz, Jane Kaczmarek, Bryan Cranston, Christopher Kennedy Masterson, Justin Berfield and Erik Per Sullivan return as Malcolm, Lois, Hal, Francis, Reese and Dewey respectively. The season introduces Jamie, the fifth child of Hal and Lois, although the baby's gender would not be revealed until the fifth season. The series' parallel storylines involving Francis shifts in this season from the previous season's Alaska to a cattle ranch. The storyline of "If Boys Were Girls" was developed by costume designer Heidi Kaczenski's then 11-year old niece Alexandra. Since Kaczmarek was pregnant before the season began filming, she was written out of some episodes, while her pregnancy was incorporated into the story later in the season. The episode "Clip Show 2" is the series' second clip show after the third season's 19th episode.

== Release ==
=== Broadcast history ===
The season premiered on November 3, 2002, on Fox, and ended on May 18, 2003, with a total of 22 episodes. According to Ned Martel of The New York Times, showrunner Linwood Boomer "chose to take a hard look at Malcolm's adolescence. That and a later time slot meant a 19 percent decline in the key demographic of viewers 18 to 49 in its fourth season's ratings."

=== Home media ===
The season was released on Region 2 DVD on March 4, 2013, and on Region 4 DVD on September 4, 2013.

=== Reception ===
Mark Sachs of Los Angeles Times said on May 10, 2003, "This well-written, solidly performed series is as close to a live-action cartoon as you can get, and when it’s clicking on all cylinders as in Sunday’s episode, it’s a joy to behold." At the 55th Primetime Emmy Awards, "If Boys Were Girls" won in the category Outstanding Single Camera Picture Editing for a Comedy Series, while Kaczmarek and Cranston received nominations for Outstanding Lead Actress In A Comedy Series and Outstanding Supporting Actor In A Comedy Series respectively. Cloris Leachman, who portrays Lois' mother Ida, won in the category Outstanding Guest Actress In A Comedy Series.
