= Malcolm in the Middle season 7 =

Malcolm in the Middle
- Season 7
- DVD cover
- Showrunner: Matthew Carlson
- Starring: Jane Kaczmarek; Bryan Cranston; Christopher Masterson; Justin Berfield; Erik Per Sullivan; Frankie Muniz
- No. of episodes: 22

Release
- Original network: Fox
- Original release: September 30, 2005 – May 14, 2006

Season chronology
- ← Previous; Season 6 Next → Malcolm in the Middle: Life's Still Unfair

The seventh and final season of Malcolm in the Middle premiered on September 30, 2005, on Fox, and ended on May 14, 2006, with a total of 22 episodes. Frankie Muniz stars as the title character Malcolm, and he is joined by Jane Kaczmarek, Bryan Cranston, Christopher Kennedy Masterson, Justin Berfield and Erik Per Sullivan.

== Cast and characters ==
=== Main ===
- Jane Kaczmarek as Lois (22 episodes)
- Bryan Cranston as Hal (22 episodes)
- Christopher Kennedy Masterson as Francis (4 episodes)
- Justin Berfield as Reese (22 episodes)
- Erik Per Sullivan as Dewey (22 episodes)
- Frankie Muniz as Malcolm (22 episodes)

=== Recurring ===
- David Anthony Higgins as Craig Feldspar
- Craig Lamar Traylor as Stevie Kenarban
- Gary Anthony Williams as Abe Kenarban
- Cloris Leachman as Ida
- Emy Coligado as Piama
- Steve Vinovich as Mr. Hodges
- Hayden Panettiere as Jessica
- Rheagan Wallace as Raduca

=== Guest stars ===
- Rosanna Arquette as Anita ("Burning Man")
- Jeff Doucette as Nate ("Burning Man")
- Tara Karsian as Shelly ("Health Insurance")
- Scott Adsit as Joe ("Health Insurance")
- Alex Weed as Karl ("Halloween")
- Rose Abdoo as Margie ("Halloween")
- Harold Sylvester as Phelps ("Secret Boyfriend")
- Erik von Detten as Brad ("Secret Boyfriend")
- Sarah Mason as Vicki ("Secret Boyfriend")
- Anastasia Baranova as Sonja ("Blackout")
- Ellen Hollman as Maayke ("Blackout")
- Larisa Oleynik as Abby Tucker ("Army Buddy")
- Vanessa Marano as Gina ("Malcolm Defends Reese")
- Kathryn Joosten as Claire ("Malcolm Defends Reese")
- Perry Anzilotti as Earl ("Malcolm's Money")
- Gloria LeRoy as Judith ("Malcolm's Money")
- Lillian Adams as Mona ("Malcolm's Money")
- Alanna Masterson as Heidi ("Malcolm's Money")
- Marcus Toji as Owen ("Malcolm's Money")
- Yvette Nicole Brown as Female Security Agent ("Bride of Ida")
- Michael Yama as Mr. Yamamoto ("Bride of Ida")
- Kathleen Garrett as Mrs. Werner ("Bride of Ida")
- Scott Klace as Ned ("College Recruiters")
- Pete Gardner as Milt ("College Recruiters")
- Roark Critchlow as Vince ("College Recruiters")
- Kathleen York as Ellie ("Mono")
- Brian Palermo as Steve ("Mono")
- Stuart Fratkin as Dave ("Mono")
- Maurice Godin as Car Dealer ("Hal Grieves")
- George Takei as Himself ("Hal Grieves")
- Stephen Lee as Speaker #1 ("A.A.")
- Matt Willig as Crash ("A.A.")
- Amy Davidson as Paula ("Lois Strikes Back")
- Danielle Savre as Heidi ("Lois Strikes Back")
- Christel Khalil as Kristin ("Lois Strikes Back")
- Emma Stone as Diane ("Lois Strikes Back")
- Dan Martin as Malik ("Hal's Dentist")
- Paul Rae as Cop ("Hal's Dentist")
- Michaela Watkins as Receptionist ("Hal's Dentist")
- Lynsey Bartilson as Danielle ("Bomb Shelter")
- Mark DeCarlo as Announcer ("Bomb Shelter")
- Sandra Purpuro as Miss Zeiger ("Bomb Shelter")
- Sonya Eddy as Mabel ("Bomb Shelter")
- Darryl Henriques as Oven Guy ("Bomb Shelter")
- Terry Rhoads as Supervisor ("Stevie in the Hospital")
- Jan Hoag as Receptionist ("Stevie in the Hospital")
- Tara Lipinski as Carrie ("Cattle Court")
- Caitlin Crosby as Kelly ("Morp")
- Shanna Collins as Shana ("Morp")
- Kate Micucci as Heather ("Morp")
- Adam Rose as Ken ("Morp")
- Nikki Boyer as Pedicurist ("Morp")
- Eddie Pepitone as Homeless Nick ("Morp")
- Linwood Boomer as Loan Shark ("Graduation")
- Raymond O'Connor as Al ("Graduation")

== Episodes ==
Season 7 episodes
No. overall	No. in season	Title	Directed by	Written by	Original release date	Prod. code	U.S. viewers (millions)
130	1	"Burning Man"	Peter Lauer	Michael Glouberman	September 30, 2005	06-05-701	3.50
Malcolm and Reese attempt to hitchhike their way to the annual Burning Man festival but are caught by Hal and Lois. Malcolm makes the event sound so interesting that they decide to turn the trip into a family vacation. At the festival, everyone heads out to participate except Hal and Dewey; Hal is scared of the Burning Man attendants who mistake his bourgeois lifestyle for performance art, while Dewey has to do all the chores around the RV. Reese and Lois fit in well at the festival, while Malcolm has sex with a healer named Anita (Rosanna Arquette), although he is dismissive of her beliefs. Reese is nominated to "burn the man down" to end the festival but cannot accept that it has ended, and in his attempts to keep the weekend going, he accidentally torches the RV. Hal and Dewey are forced to work to pay for the RV, Malcolm ends up depressed, and Lois and Reese secretly agree to return the following year.
131	2	"Health Insurance"	Steve Welch	Rob Ulin	October 7, 2005	06-05-702	3.44
Hal finds out that the family has been without health insurance for six months and tries to safeguard the house until Monday, when the insurance is put back into effect. His over-protection of the house and the boys ends when he accidentally breaks his leg. He then goes to great lengths to keep Lois from finding out. In the meantime, Lois tries to fish out a union snitch at the Lucky Aide store. Note: In 2021, a clip from this episode was shown in the WandaVision episode "Previously On". Also in 2021, the sixth episode of Wandavision, "All-New Halloween Spooktacular!" is a tribute to sitcoms of the late 1990s and early 2000s, especially Malcolm in the Middle.
132	3	"Reese vs. Stevie"	Linwood Boomer	Alex Reid	October 21, 2005	06-05-703	3.63
An angry Reese threatens Stevie, who dreads a retaliation. Dewey becomes addicted to cigarettes, thanks to ex-smoker Hal's many stashes around the house, so he tries to help Dewey quit by giving up coffee in solidarity with him. Lois tries to make Jamie talk by telling him about her high school years, which turns into Lois dealing with the emotional and mental abuse she went through with her mother.
133	4	"Halloween"	David D'Ovidio	Andy Bobrow	October 28, 2005	06-05-704	3.53
Hal freaks out when Malcolm gives him the details of a grisly mass murder that occurred in the house years ago. Lois is working on Halloween and catches a shoplifter as everyone else at Lucky Aide throws a wild party. Reese and Dewey lose track of Jamie as they flee from an angry elderly neighbor named Mr. Sheldon after egging his house, while Lois gets arrested for abducting a child when she picks up a random woman's child dressed in Jamie's costume.
134	5	"Jessica Stays Over"	Alex Reid	Matthew Carlson	November 4, 2005	06-05-705	3.53
Jessica (Hayden Panettiere) moves in on a temporary basis and teaches Malcolm how to manipulate others, but when he uses her tricks on Lois he feels something he has never felt before: empathy. Meanwhile, Hal battles a bee who is out for revenge for killing the rest of his hive, and Reese mails himself to China to get the fireworks and nunchucks that his Chinese penpal won't give him, but Dewey decides it would be funnier to leave Reese in the garage and make it sound like he's being shipped to China, which ends with Jessica's East Asian boyfriend beating up Reese.
135	6	"Secret Boyfriend"	Peter Lauer	Gary Murphy	November 11, 2005	06-05-706	3.65
Malcolm dates a hot, popular, and secretly brainy girl named Vicki (Sarah Mason) who fears ruining her image by seeing him publicly. Meanwhile, Reese is kicked out of the house for refusing to get a job, and Hal is in a heated conflict with Phelps (Harold Sylvester), the owner of a miniature golf course because he will not give Dewey a free game.
136	7	"Blackout"	Steve Welch	Eric Kaplan	November 18, 2005	06-05-707	3.18
In this non-linear episode, a power outage caused by Jamie's balloon disrupts Lois and Hal's anniversary and reveals Malcolm's trysts with young European women. Reese tries to cook Kobe beef for Hal, Francis tries to steal a fish he and Hal caught years ago, and Dewey is upset that he cannot pick dinner.
137	8	"Army Buddy"	Peter Lauer	Neil Thompson	December 2, 2005	06-05-708	3.14
Abby Tucker (Larisa Oleynik), a girl Reese befriended in the Army, visits the family house, and Reese assumes she has feelings for him, only to discover that she's a lesbian with a crush on Lois. Meanwhile, Lois finds renewed energy with orthotic inserts for her shoes, Hal fears she will not look to him for support anymore and plots to destroy the inserts. Malcolm owes Dewey $10 and gives him a box of junk to pay it off. When one of the comics inside turns out to be rare and valuable, Dewey forces Malcolm to do embarrassing things in order to get the money back.
138	9	"Malcolm Defends Reese"	Bryan Cranston	Matthew Carlson	December 16, 2005	06-05-709	3.17
Malcolm and Reese end up in the same class since Reese failed the previous year. Mr. Herkabe, who may lose his award for the school's highest GPA to Malcolm, gleefully humiliates Reese every day until Malcolm agrees to start failing his classes. However, Malcolm tells the school's principal, Mr. Hodges (Steve Vinovich) that Herkabe skipped Gym in the last semester his senior year (creating his own A.P. class in its place) and lied about taking the course for years upon Herkabe casually mentioning it to him. Hodges then publicly strips Herkabe of the GPA award, much to his humiliation, and returns it to original recipient Edna Thornby, who took and managed to pass Gym despite being blind and clubfooted. Herkabe decides to retake Gym afterwards to reclaim it and Reese embarrasses him as revenge for the torments he suffered. Elsewhere, Jamie's new babysitter, Claire (Kathryn Joosten) drives Lois crazy with her nonstop talking, and Hal tries to help Dewey talk to Gina (Vanessa Marano), a girl he likes, with the attempts ending in disaster.
139	10	"Malcolm's Money"	Steve Love	Michael Glouberman	January 6, 2006	06-05-710	3.56
Lois and Hal receive Malcolm's college grant check for $10,000 and decide that the family needs it more than he does. Meanwhile, Malcolm does battle with a yearbook photographer who keeps taking bad pictures of him.
140	11	"Bride of Ida"	Linwood Boomer	Rob Ulin	January 13, 2006	06-05-711	3.80
Dewey, Lois and Hal go out of town to St. Louis for a piano competition and, as punishment for coming back home after curfew, Lois has Grandma Ida watch Malcolm and Reese. They end up missing their plane, and while waiting, Hal finds a man's membership card to a prestigious airport club and gets roped into an international situation. Grandma Ida makes Reese marry Ida's helper, Raduca (Rheagan Wallace), but only if he defeats Malcolm in three challenges. When Lois, Dewey and Hal return, they find out that Ida has gone while Reese has run away with Raduca to Las Vegas to get married.
141	12	"College Recruiters"	Peter Lauer	Jay Kogen	January 29, 2006	06-05-712	4.37
Hal takes over the college recruiters, which Malcolm refuses to meet with, and treats each one as a suitor. However, Hal's plans are ruined when Malcolm chooses to go to Harvard. Meanwhile, Reese tries to help Raduca get her U.S. citizenship, but doesn't notice that Raduca is cheating on Reese with a man he foolishly thinks is her brother, while Dewey stays over with Francis and learns just how down-and-out he is as an unemployed mooch.
142	13	"Mono"	David D'Ovidio	Andy Bobrow	February 12, 2006	06-05-713	3.86
Lois discovers she has mono after a visit to the doctor. Upon giving it to Malcolm, they are both forced to quarantine for two weeks in the same room, where an unlikely bond forms between them. Hal is invited to all of his neighbors' parties. Although happy at first, Hal is horrified when he learns just how much they hate Lois and celebrate the days she won't be attending any of them. Dewey makes Jamie his slave, and he teaches Reese to be nice to Jamie. After their recovery, Malcolm and Lois revert to their old habits.
143	14	"Hal Grieves"	Christopher Kennedy Masterson	Eric Kaplan	February 19, 2006	06-05-714	3.95
Hal gets a devastating phone call that his father has died, but because he never knew his father well, he does not shed a tear. In an attempt to overcompensate with his sons, Hal buys the boys copious gifts and lets them miss school repeatedly. Abe thinks that a phone call from Leonard Nimoy will cheer up Hal, but George Takei arrives instead. Just before Hal signs his name to purchase an expensive car for Malcolm, the pen he is using reminds him of his father, and he breaks down in cathartic tears while Lois consoles him.
144	15	"A.A."	Steve Welch	Al Higgins	March 5, 2006	06-05-715	4.12
Lois and Hal visit Francis to help him celebrate one year of sobriety, but when they attend his A.A. meeting, they find out that he pretended to be an alcoholic so he can tell the other, actual alcoholics about how Lois was a bad mom to him. Meanwhile, Malcolm and Reese find the spare key to Hal's car and plan to spend the evening terrorizing the neighborhood, but when they refuse to drive Dewey to the arcade, he swallows the key.
145	16	"Lois Strikes Back"	Alex Reid	Gary Murphy	March 19, 2006	06-05-716	4.94
Reese falls into a catatonic state when he gets pranked by four mean girls: Paula (Amy Davidson), Heidi (Danielle Savre), Kristin (Christel Khalil) and Diane (Emma Stone). When Mr. Hodges won't do anything about it (since Reese is such a bad student that he finds it funny and thinks Reese deserves it), Lois goes on a roaring rampage of revenge. Meanwhile, Hal creates a pitching machine out of garage junk, which ends up being used as a paint balloon catapult for the last of the four mean girls.
146	17	"Hal's Dentist"	Steve Love	Jay Kogen	March 26, 2006	06-05-717	3.58
Hal's friend Trey tells him to come to his dental office when he cracks a tooth during a poker game. Their friendship is jeopardized when Hal is faced with a $2,000 bill, despite believing the work would be free. Reese teaches Lois how to ride a bike. Malcolm and Dewey's favorite pastime becomes sleeping after they find a brand-new mattress.
147	18	"Bomb Shelter"	Matthew Carlson	Rob Ulin	April 2, 2006	06-05-719	3.74
Malcolm joins a local dance class to meet a cute girl, but after discovering she is a poor dancer, he realizes that he must accept Danielle (Lynsey Bartilson), the unattractive but more talented partner, in order to win the competition. While trying to bury their father's broken trophy, Reese and Dewey discover an underground bomb shelter in the backyard and lock Hal in it. Although Hal is initially furious, he discovers the bomb shelter actually has a luxurious living space from the Cold War era. Lois tries to win a new truck at the shopping mall by keeping her hand on it.
148	19	"Stevie in the Hospital"	Steve Welch	Dave Ihlenfeld & David Wright	April 9, 2006	06-05-720	3.60
When Stevie goes to the hospital, Malcolm tries making up every excuse he can think of not to go because he can't face the truth about his illness. Meanwhile, Hal gets highly competitive about his new remote-controlled boat when a ten-year-old keeps knocking it over. Lois thinks Dewey is sabotaging her after she forgets to get him baking soda for a school project, and Reese's new job as a telemarketer turns into a life-or-death situation when he has to deal with a suicidal man on the other line.
149	20	"Cattle Court"	Peter Lauer	Michael Glouberman	April 16, 2006	06-05-718	2.89
Reese meets a cute vegetarian named Carrie (Tara Lipinski) at the meat plant. Although they initially argue about their choice of diet, Reese tries to prove himself to Carrie by releasing a herd of cows meant to be slaughtered into the city streets, where they are crushed by oncoming traffic. Malcolm tries to fool Craig in order to attend a rock concert. Hal makes a grittily realistic version of The Game of Life to beat Dewey, under the guise of teaching his son a lesson about real life.
150	21	"Morp"	David D'Ovidio	Gary Murphy	April 23, 2006	06-05-721	3.02
For the senior prom, Reese gets paid to take Janine, a studious girl in class, but only after she gives him a makeover and sends him to finishing school. Malcolm aligns himself with the unpopular students to form an anti-prom they call "Morp", but some of the more popular students invite the Morp guests to attend the regular senior prom, abandoning the still-defiant Malcolm. Dewey discovers there are no childhood pictures of him, so he concocts an elaborate scavenger hunt to punish Hal and Lois and throw a party for Jamie.
151	22	"Graduation"	Linwood Boomer	Michael Glouberman	May 14, 2006	06-05-722	7.38
As Malcolm struggles with writing his valedictorian speech and must decide between going to Harvard and accepting a dream job, Hal consults with organized crime to raise the last $5,000 he needs to send Malcolm to college. Meanwhile, Reese moves in with Craig and becomes an assistant janitor at the high school. Dewey threatens to blackmail Francis so the boys can get his help destroying evidence of their fake X-ray of Lois having cancer to distract her from their bad report cards from years ago. After Reese's plan to make the worst mess ever so he can prove his worth as a janitor ends with an explosion in the family car, Malcolm goes on a rant about how his family makes everything so hard for him. Lois reveals she and the other family members planned this all along so Malcolm can become President of the United States, specifically one who legitimately cares about the middle class. Nevertheless, Malcolm finally reconciles with Lois as he makes his speech. In an epilogue three months later, Reese and Craig become best friends, and Reese keeps his job as a janitor after he frames his boss for installing peepholes in the girls' bathroom; Dewey and Jamie continue their brothers' tradition of causing household mischief; Francis enjoys life with a stable office job, but still argues with Lois about being an unemployed slacker; Hal and Lois panic when Lois discovers she is pregnant again; and Malcolm finally attends Harvard on work study as a janitor.

== Production ==
In March–April 2005, Fox renewed Malcolm in the Middle for a seventh season. The following month, it was reported that series creator Linwood Boomer would not continue as showrunner, instead retaining an "executive consultant credit" while Matthew Carlson, would replace Boomer as showrunner. In January 2006, it was announced that it would be the final season; the decision behind this was widely attributed to declining viewership. Main cast members Frankie Muniz, Jane Kaczmarek, Bryan Cranston, Christopher Kennedy Masterson, Justin Berfield and Erik Per Sullivan return as Malcolm, Lois, Hal, Francis, Reese and Dewey respectively. As with the sixth season, Masterson made fewer appearances than the rest of the main cast.

== Release ==
=== Broadcast history ===
The season premiered on September 30, 2005, on Fox, and ended on May 14, 2006, with a total of 22 episodes.

=== Home media ===
The season was released on Region 2 DVD on October 7, 2013, and on Region 4 DVD on September 4, 2013.

== Reception ==
In his review of the series finale, Matthew Gilbert of The Boston Globe said it "sails by, with none of the grandstanding and schmaltz many finales rely on to make an ending profound." Alan Pergament of The Buffalo News said, "Since it isn't exactly a warm and fuzzy comedy, you shouldn't expect Malcolm to get sappy at the end. Fortunately, it strikes a nice balance between maintaining its insanity (there's a messy explosion), having a few sweet moments and a suitably nightmarish ending." Rob Owen of Pittsburgh Post-Gazette said, "At a half-hour, it's not a bloated finale, nor is it particularly memorable, but this last "Malcolm" does send the show out in a style that's familiar to the show's fans."

At the 58th Primetime Emmy Awards, the season received four nominations: Outstanding Lead Actress in a Comedy Series for Kaczmarek, Outstanding Supporting Actor in a Comedy Series for Cranston, Outstanding Guest Actress in a Comedy Series for Cloris Leachman and Outstanding Choreography for Fred Tallaksen for the episode "Bomb Shelter"; Leachman was the only winner.
