= Malcolm in the Middle season 2 =

Season of television series

Malcolm in the Middle
- Season 2
- Australian DVD cover
- Starring: Jane Kaczmarek; Bryan Cranston; Christopher Masterson; Justin Berfield; Erik Per Sullivan; Catherine Lloyd Burns; Frankie Muniz
- No. of episodes: 25

Release
- Original network: Fox
- Original release: November 5, 2000 – May 20, 2001

Season chronology
- ← Previous; Season 1 Next → Season 3

The second season of the American television sitcom Malcolm in the Middle premiered on November 5, 2000, and ended on May 20, 2001. The twenty-five episode season was broadcast in the United States on the Fox Network. The series follows young Malcolm (Frankie Muniz) and his dysfunctional family, including his mother Lois (Jane Kaczmarek), father Hal (Bryan Cranston), older brothers Francis (Christopher Masterson) and Reese (Justin Berfield), and younger brother Dewey (Erik Per Sullivan). A child prodigy, Malcolm attends a class dubbed the "Krelboyne class", taught by Caroline Miller (Catherine Lloyd Burns).

The season was ordered shortly following the success of the first, and the premiere episode continues from the previous season finale, "Water Park", which helped launch an advertising campaign for the season: "Where's Dewey?". All main cast members from the first season return, with Burns leaving the series during this season, making it the last to have her as part of the main cast. The season contained multiple unique concepts, including the use of split screens in the Sliding Doors-inspired episode "Bowling", and extensive backstories for each of Hal and Lois' children in "Flashback".

The season averaged 14.50 million viewers and received positive reviews from critics, who felt it was of similar, or higher, quality to the first. "Bowling" received critical acclaim for its unique premise for the time, and received several award nominations, as did the rest of the season. The season was set to be released on Region 1 DVD in the fall of 2003, but was ultimately cancelled due to high costs of music clearances, but was later released on Region 4 DVD in Australia on September 4, 2013.

== Cast and characters ==
=== Main ===
- Jane Kaczmarek as Lois
- Bryan Cranston as Hal
- Christopher Kennedy Masterson as Francis
- Justin Berfield as Reese
- Erik Per Sullivan as Dewey
- Frankie Muniz as Malcolm

=== Recurring ===
- Craig Lamar Traylor as Stevie Kenarban
- Catherine Lloyd Burns as Caroline Miller
- David Anthony Higgins as Craig Feldspar
- Daniel von Bargen as Commandant Edwin Spangler
- Drew Powell as Cadet Drew
- Eric Nenninger as Eric Hanson
- Evan Matthew Cohen as Lloyd
- Kasan Butcher as Joe
- Kyle Sullivan as Dabney
- Merrin Dungey as Kitty Kenarban
- Tania Raymonde as Cynthia Sanders

=== Guest stars ===
- Hallee Hirsh as Jessica ("Traffic Jam")
- Clyde Kusatsu as Ice Cream Man ("Traffic Jam")
- Mark Christopher Lawrence as Sheriff #1 ("Traffic Jam")
- Leslie David Baker as Cop ("Halloween Approximately")
- Sean Marquette as Boy ("Lois' Birthday")
- Michael Horse as Security Guy ("Casino")
- Melody Perkins as Patty Henderson ("Convention")
- Robert Curtis Brown as Tom ("Convention")
- Alison La Placa as Barbara ("Convention")
- Maz Jobrani as Robber #2 ("Robbery")
- Nancy Lenehan as Christie ("Therapy")
- Johnny Lewis as Martin ("Therapy")
- Busy Philipps as Meghan ("High School Play")
- Natasha Melnick as Amber ("High School Play")
- Octavia Spencer as Cashier ("High School Play")
- Jerry Messing as Big Kid #2 ("The Bully")
- Florence Stanley as Mrs. Griffin ("Old Mrs. Old")
- Gregory Jbara as Mike ("New Neighbors")
- Robin Riker as Tina ("New Neighbors")
- Michael Welch as Josh ("New Neighbors")
- Dakota Fanning as Emily ("New Neighbors")
- Kurt Fuller as Mr. Young ("Hal Quits")
- Shaun Toub as Janic ("Hal Quits")
- Steffani Brass as Eliza ("Hal Quits")
- Robert Loggia as Victor ("The Grandparents")
- Cloris Leachman as Ida ("The Grandparents")
- Sam McMurray as Officer Stockton ("Traffic Ticket")
- Steven Gilborn as Dr. Harrison ("Surgery")
- Miriam Flynn as Cooking Teacher ("Reese Cooks")
- Ashlee Simpson as High School Girl ("Reese Cooks")
- Dave "Gruber" Allen as Mr. Woodward ("Tutoring Reese")
- Alex McKenna as Beth ("Bowling")
- Cerina Vincent as Carly ("Malcolm vs. Reese")
- Matthew McGrory as Lothar ("Carnival")
- Casey Sander as Captain James ("Evacuation")
- Jerry Trainor as Guardsman ("Evacuation")
- Reagan Dale Neis as Laura ("Evacuation")
- Stuart Pankin as Doctor ("Flashback")

== Episodes ==
Season 2 episodes
No. overall	No. in season	Title	Directed by	Written by	Original release date	Prod. code	U.S. viewers (millions)
17	1	"Traffic Jam"	Todd Holland	Dan Kopelman	November 5, 2000	06-00-204	15.52
On the drive home from the water park, Hal causes another car to crash, followed by a traffic jam. Lois tries to help clear the accident so they can drive again but cannot accept that it is beyond her control. Hal has an existential crisis when he realizes how easily the accident could have happened to them. Their son Reese and several kids harass a man in an ice cream truck who refuses to sell to them. Genius middle child Malcolm spends the time with a girl, Jessica (Hallee Hirsh), and is devastated to learn she lives in Canada. She tries to give him her phone number, but a dog that Lois freed takes it. At the military academy, eldest son Francis tries to eat 100 candy quacks to settle an argument and succeeds. Meanwhile, youngest Dewey finds himself lost after deserting his dead babysitter, and is escorted home by a variety of people, arriving just before the family returns.
18	2	"Halloween Approximately"	Todd Holland	Dan Kopelman	November 8, 2000	06-00-207	9.18
When Francis comes home for a post-Halloween visit, he helps his brothers get back into the holiday spirit by building a giant slingshot on the roof of their house to terrorize the neighborhood. Soon they are defeated when several "Krelboynes"—the kids that attend Malcolm's genius class at school—fight back. Hal and Lois track down a joyrider in a blue 1972 Chevrolet Chevelle who is constantly speeding down their street and taunting them, but they end up stealing his car. They think about leaving their lives and escaping to Mexico, but they ultimately come to their senses, drown the car in a lake and return home.
19	3	"Lois' Birthday"	Ken Kwapis	Alex Reid	November 12, 2000	06-00-205	16.43
Lois gives the boys money to buy her birthday presents, but they spend most of it on candy and give her cheap gifts. When Hal forgets it is her birthday, Lois runs away and goes to a batting cage. Francis, who had come home for Lois' birthday, convinces an African school student to ditch her bus tour and come with him instead. When he learns what his brothers have done, he disciplines them for their selfishness but decides to stay home with the student. At the batting cage, Hal and the boys throw a party for Lois together, but she isn't impressed. However, when the lead clown hired objectifies her, the family fight with all the clowns, and Lois is touched by their actions.
20	4	"Dinner Out"	Jeff Melman	Michael Glouberman & Andrew Orenstein	November 15, 2000	06-00-206	9.73
The family has a dinner date with Malcolm's disabled friend Stevie's parents, the Kenarbans, a seemingly perfect family. Father Abe gets drunk with Hal, and Stevie, after playing a game with him and Malcolm, punches Reese. As a result of the punch and Lois telling her to let her emotions out more, Kitty yells at Stevie in front of everyone. Meanwhile, while Commandant Spangler is busy with a woman, the military academy is free for the day, and so Francis invites a group of local girls to a party. The girls trash the academy, and Francis asks Spangler what to do, and together they try to contain the damage and stop this from spreading.
21	5	"Casino"	Todd Holland	Gary Murphy & Neil Thompson	November 19, 2000	06-00-209	14.21
Malcolm and his family go on vacation at a casino on an Indian reservation. Hal is banned from the gambling area after secretly using Malcolm to help count cards for him at a blackjack table. Unable to gamble, Hal looks for another form of recreation and takes Malcolm and Reese on a hike through the desert, where they accidentally wander onto a US Army artillery range, and must find their way back without touching any explosives. Lois wins a day at the spa and shares it with Dewey since the rest of the family is gone. Francis ditches school, thinking he will have the house to himself while his family is gone, only to run into Lois' coworker—and secret admirer—Craig, who also snuck in the house uninvited, and they bond.
22	6	"Convention"	Jeff Melman	Bob Stevens	November 22, 2000	06-00-208	9.87
Hal and Lois go out of town to a convention, where Hal keeps picking fights with a coworker who stole his idea. Lois tells Hal that he has a choice to either fight the man and they will both be arrested, or he can take his anger out on her with sex; he picks the latter. Malcolm and Reese compete for the attention of their babysitter Patty (Melody Perkins), Francis' friend from grade school. She finds Dewey adorable and gives him affection, while ignoring the others.
23	7	"Robbery"	Todd Holland	Alan J. Higgins	November 26, 2000	06-00-215	15.52
Lois and Craig are robbed at their job at the Lucky Aide, where Craig admits his unrequited feelings for Lois. Hal brings home an armoire as an anniversary gift, but it is full of bats. He and the boys manage to get rid of them all but end up trashing the house. Francis tries to cheer up a recently dumped cadet by taking him to a strip club, then an illegal cockfight, and the cadet appreciates Francis for showing him how worse life can get after they are arrested.
24	8	"Therapy"	Ken Kwapis	Ian Busch	November 29, 2000	06-00-210	9.53
Malcolm fakes an emotional breakdown in order to get out of the "Krelboyne" class' Medieval Week. Hal and Lois clean out a packed closet and find that it is actually a bathroom with a functional toilet. Dewey reveals a hidden talent for skittles, but his expertise disappears as soon as Hal tries to show it off. When Francis starts laundry duty at military school, he starts a business and black market making people overpay for these services. The other cadets soon get revenge on Francis by ruining the detergent and allow him to be found out by Spangler.
25	9	"High School Play"	Jeff Melman	Maggie Bandur & Pang-Ni Landrum	December 10, 2000	06-00-211	16.92
Malcolm gets a role in a high school play and starts spending his time with gossiping high schoolers. Caroline gives birth in the school parking lot when the model rocket of the "Krelboynes" goes awry. Hal and Dewey create a LEGO city, and take it more seriously than expected. At the play, the constant exposure to high-school gossip causes Malcolm to forget his lines, and he is humiliated in front of his family and peers.
26	10	"The Bully"	Jeff Melman	Alex Reid	December 17, 2000	06-00-214	15.87
After being beaten by a girl in wrestling, Reese relinquishes his role as the school bully, which allows other kids to pick on Malcolm. This also allows for all of the up-and-coming bullies in school, who make everyone's lives even more miserable. However, Reese returns when he feels they go too far by picking on Stevie. Francis tries to avoid a birthday hazing ritual of having his whole body shaved, but is unsuccessful, and must go on a date bald.
27	11	"Old Mrs. Old"	Todd Holland	Alan J. Higgins	January 7, 2001	06-00-213	17.10
After breaking her arm, Malcolm must help care for a cranky old woman, Mrs. Griffin (Florence Stanley). When Lois catches him on a joyride in her car, she covers for him, but he must continue to help her daily. Francis' slacker friend Richie is sent to the military academy, and Commandant Spangler acts nice to him to lure him into doing something that can allow him to be kicked out. The cadets beat Richie up in an attempt to make him see Spangler for who he is. Reese tries to convince Dewey to use a regular backpack instead of a purse, but soon sees Dewey use to beat bullies with a purse holding a brick.
28	12	"Krelboyne Girl"	Arlene Sanford	Bob Stevens	January 14, 2001	06-00-212	14.86
Malcolm's class has a new student named Cynthia (Tania Raymonde), and she has a crush on him. Malcolm is unsure how to react to this, panicking about romance and what he is and isn't ready for, and ends up throwing a brick through her window in the middle of the night. She is mad at first, but ends up forgiving him, after Lois embarrasses him in front of Cynthia and her father.
29	13	"New Neighbors"	Ken Kwapis	Maggie Bandur & Pang-Ni Landrum	January 21, 2001	06-00-219	14.89
New neighbors move in next to the family, and most members of the two families soon grow to hate each other. Mike (Gregory Jbara), the father, however, quickly becomes best friends with Hal, and they keep their friendship secret. Being tormented by their new neighbors, the family decides to exact revenge. However, during the execution of their plan, they catch Tina (Robin Riker), the mother of the family in the hot tub cheating on her husband with their gardener, and draw the entire neighborhood to the scene, causing the family to leave. Commandant Spangler becomes so stressed about Oliver North's upcoming visit that he gets drunk and passes out on the day of the visit. When he regains consciousness, Francis lies to him and says that Spangler and North talked extensively.
30	14	"Hal Quits"	Ken Kwapis	Michael Glouberman & Andrew Orenstein	February 4, 2001	06-00-216	18.59
Hal quits his job after a humiliating career day at Dewey's school, and spends his free time painting in the garage. He drives himself crazy adding more and more layers to the painting until it collapses onto him. Francis reluctantly works at the Lucky Aide over spring break, helping to take inventory. Malcolm questions his future after an aptitude test reveals that he could do any job he wants, leaving him without a clear path.
31	15	"The Grandparents"	Todd Holland	Gary Murphy & Neil Thompson	February 11, 2001	06-00-217	14.33
Lois' parents Victor (Robert Loggia) and Ida (Cloris Leachman) visit and don't approve of anyone in the family except Reese. Hal buys a new refrigerator as Victor promised to reimburse him for it, but Victor changes his mind. Victor also gives Reese a case of his old grenades from World War II, but Reese pulls the pin and Victor breaks the handle off, so Malcolm throws it in the new fridge to keep it from destroying the house. Hal gives Victor and Ida an ultimatum: if they do not compensate for the destroyed fridge, he will report them to the police for child endangerment. Meanwhile, Francis is sick from bad sushi while he and the cadets are in New Orleans for Mardi Gras, staying in the hotel room all weekend.
32	16	"Traffic Ticket"	Jeff Melman	Larry Strawther	February 18, 2001	06-00-218	15.80
Lois is arrested for reckless driving due to several outstanding parking tickets from Francis. She orders Francis to pay off the fines or else never come home, which leads Francis to do dangerous stunts to earn the money. Lois disputes the reckless driving citation, believing the officer has a personal grudge against her. When security camera footage shows that Lois was wrong, she realizes she was wrong for the first time in her life, but then becomes more easygoing, and tells Francis to use the money to visit for a weekend. Craig finds a security camera from a different angle showing that Lois was right, but Hal and the boys destroy it and warn Craig to remain silent.
33	17	"Surgery"	Jeff Melman	Maggie Bandur & Pang-Ni Landrum	February 25, 2001	06-00-222	17.55
Malcolm is hospitalized with diagnosed appendicitis. He begins feeling better and struggles to prove the diagnosis wrong before the surgery. The rest of the family obsesses over a board game called March and Conquer, which they usually don't play since Malcolm always quickly beats them. Francis and the cadets go on a hunger strike after Spangler takes away their television, but due to their lack of clear thought when hungry, they finally agree to settle for the promise of negligible improvements.
34	18	"Reese Cooks"	Jeff Melman	Dan Kopelman	March 4, 2001	06-00-220	17.03
Hal forces Reese to attend a culinary class as a punishment, only for Reese to discover he is remarkable at it. In the class' final cooking contest, Reese tampers with the other contestants' entries. Hal and Lois subsequently forbid him to cook for a month, which greatly upsets him, leaving them satisfied that his punishment has finally affected him. Cynthia organizes a party to become friends with all her classmates. Malcolm, worried that no one would come, shows her that she has no friends and upsets her. However, later, everyone comes to the party. At the academy, cadet Eric tries to force Francis to do his half of a major project, but Francis constantly procrastinates.
35	19	"Tutoring Reese"	Ken Kwapis	Ian Busch	March 11, 2001	06-00-221	14.90
Malcolm tutors Reese so he won't be sent to the remedial class by his teacher Mr. Woodward (Dave Allen), but keeps failing. Out of desperation, Malcolm takes Reese's test for him. He still fails, and Malcolm discovers Woodward has been deliberately failing Reese regardless of accuracy. Meanwhile, Francis gets kicked out of the house for not re-shingling the roof and lives with Richie, but finds the conditions even worse. When Mr. Woodward comes over to give Lois and Hal the paperwork for remedial class, Malcolm exposes him, but accidentally reveals that he cheated in the first place. In the end, Francis caves to his mother's demands and returns home, and he, the boys, and Woodward are all forced to re-shingle the roof together.
36	20	"Bowling"	Todd Holland	Alex Reid	April 1, 2001	06-00-223	13.71
Alternating between two realities where the parental roles are switched, one parent must drive Malcolm and Reese to the bowling alley, while the other stays home with a grounded Dewey. In both versions, the boys cause trouble at the alley while competing for the affections of a girl named Beth (Alex McKenna), and Dewey tries to fool the parent who stays with him into letting him stay up late. In the end in both versions, when the parent that went to the alley returns home with Malcolm and Reese, they ask their spouse to take the boys next time.
37	21	"Malcolm vs. Reese"	Todd Holland	Story by : Dan Danko & Tom Mason; Teleplay by : Dan Kopelman	April 22, 2001	06-00-226	14.46
Francis bribes Malcolm and Reese with one extra ticket to a wrestling match, forcing them to humiliate themselves and do all his chores to win it. However, Francis ends up taking a girl, Carly (Cerina Vincent). Reese and Malcolm get revenge by stealing his driver's license, reporting the family car as stolen to the police, and tying themselves up in the trunk, getting Francis arrested. Dewey is hired to watch Craig's cat, but he loses it. Hal and Lois come to help, but make things worse, burning down Craig's house, and Craig moves in with the family.
38	22	"Mini-Bike"	Ken Kwapis	Michael Glouberman & Andrew Orenstein	April 29, 2001	06-00-227	14.59
Craig annoys the family while living with them. The boys buy a used moped and fix it up, only to have Lois confiscate it. Reese takes the bike out anyway and ends up breaking his leg. Malcolm tricks Craig into believing he ran over Reese. Even though Lois eventually finds out the truth, she does not punish them because it got Craig to leave. Hal visits Francis at the academy's father/son day and is disappointed to learn that Francis is still a troublemaker. He is later proud when Francis stands up for his friends to an unfair Spangler.
39	23	"Carnival"	Ken Kwapis	Alex Reid	May 6, 2001	06-00-225	13.61
Reese, Malcolm, and Stevie sneak into the town's county fair. Dewey spies on them and blackmails them into taking him. They all sneak off to the fair together, but they arrive as it closes and end up being locked in and chased by a drunken guard. Hal and Lois intend to spend the evening having sex until they and Stevie's parents learn the boys lied about their whereabouts. They search various places around town and eventually find them. The four are punished by having to walk back home.
40	24	"Evacuation"	Todd Holland	Gary Murphy & Neil Thompson	May 13, 2001	06-00-228	14.02
Hal and Dewey accidentally cause a train transporting toxic waste to derail, forcing the neighborhood to evacuate. Dewey convinces everyone that he is an orphan, and Reese starts running a black market. Overcome with guilt over causing the wreck, Hal tries to help other evacuees and collects donations for the "orphan", unaware it is Dewey. Malcolm is grounded, and Lois forces him to stay with her the entire time. Malcolm stands up to Lois, Reese's black market is discovered, and Dewey calls Hal his dad and confesses to causing the wreck, causing everyone to assume Hal scammed them. Malcolm stays inside and relaxes as the others are forced to sleep outside. Eric takes Francis out on a blind double date, but Francis' date turns out to be Eric's date's younger sister. However, Francis has a better time with the girl than Eric has with his own date.
41	25	"Flashback"	Jeff Melman	Ian Busch	May 20, 2001	06-00-224	13.77
Lois might be pregnant, and she and Hal look back at the memories of their children's births. Francis was born during Hal and Lois' wedding, Reese was born prematurely after Lois immediately pushed him out with her strength, and Malcolm was born in the front yard because Hal wasn't there to drive her to the hospital, and her car was locked. Dewey was born in the backyard in the rain since the family had to evacuate the house after Malcolm filled it with chlorine gas. Dewey, who has been listening to his parents, is happy that they are not arguing anymore, previously thinking they were getting divorced. Lois is revealed not to be pregnant after all.

== Production ==
=== Development ===
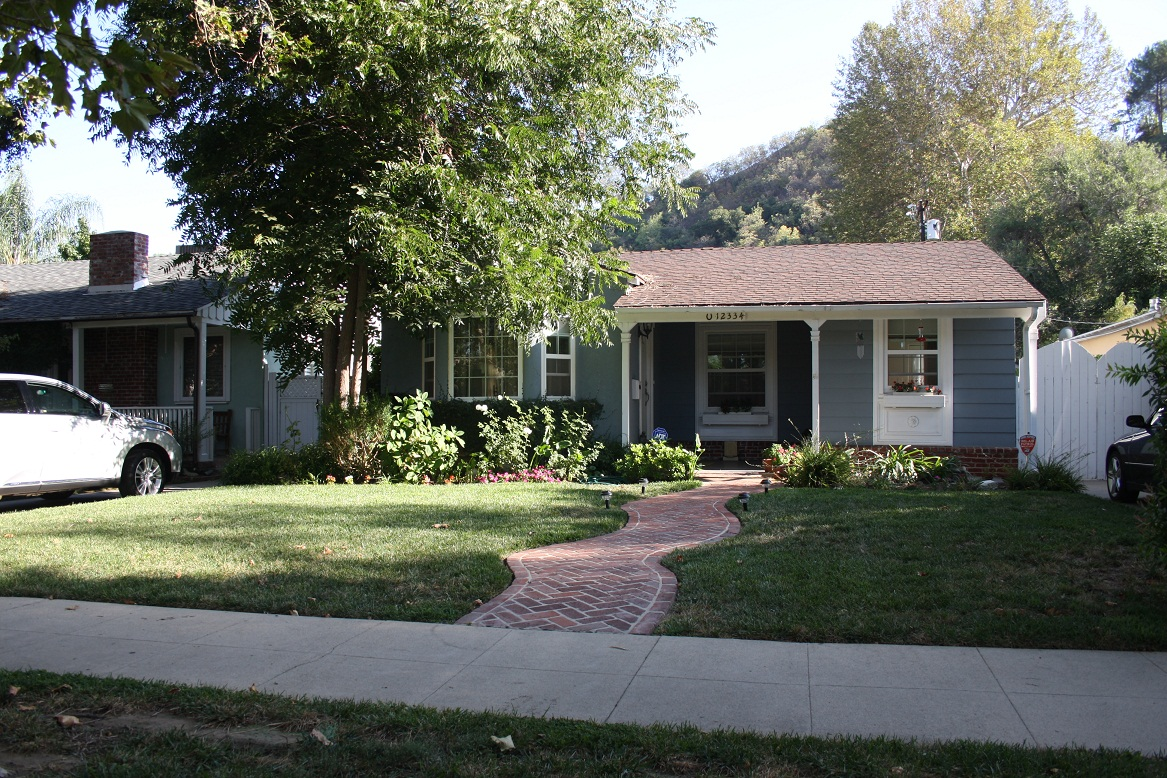
The location used for exterior shots of the family house. The interior of the house, which was on a sound stage, cost US$−70,000 to build.

Following the high ratings and critical success of the first season, a second season was soon ordered by the Fox Broadcasting Company. The season continues after the previous season's cliffhanger in "Water Park", where Dewey, after leaving his deceased babysitter, runs off to an unknown location. Final credits for the scripts started on August 18, 2000, and concluded several months later. Part of the ordered second season was aired as the final few episodes of season one, which only contained 13 ordered episodes.

=== Casting ===
The season contained the return of all main cast members, including Frankie Muniz, Jane Kaczmarek, Bryan Cranston, Christopher Kennedy Masterson, Justin Berfield and Erik Per Sullivan return as Malcolm, Lois, Hal, Francis, Reese and Dewey respectively. Catherine Lloyd Burns, who portrayed Caroline Miller as a regular in season one, also returns, but left the series following this season.

The season contained multiple guest stars, such as Robert Loggia as Lois' father Victor, and Cloris Leachman as her mother Ida. Leslie David Baker also appeared as a cop, one of his earliest television roles before he became known as Stanley Hudson on The Office.

=== Filming and inspirations ===
"Bowling" alternates between two storylines with the same characters, taking inspiration from Sliding Doors, and utilizing several split screens in its cinematography. The episode "Flashback" gives backstories to each of the children's births and childhoods, and to Hal and Lois' marriage. During the production of "Lois' Birthday", the scene of the family beating up a pair of clowns that offends Lois was a highlight of the season for Masterson, who recalled that they really "kicked the piss" out of stuntmen during filming. After a scene from "Old Mrs. Old" in which Dewey hits a bully with a purse filled with a brick went viral, Berfield recalled that they used "fake stunt bricks" when Dewey hits the bully. However, real bricks were used when he swung the purse, as to keep the assumed weight of the purse accurate.

For the season, the set for the family's house cost US$−70,000 to create, and it was built by the set's headman Bill Fariello, who, along with his crew, was asked to bring all their "junk" in to help build the set. Its interior is on a sound stage in CBS' lot in Studio City. While filming "Hal Quits", Cranston had to cover himself completely in blue paint as Hal tries to properly get ready to paint. He noted that covering himself in the paint was a poor decision, since "your body can't regulate the heat if you're covering up all your pores", and him moving around while filming added to the uncomfortable feeling Cranston felt. After a while, he started to feel worse, and was quickly thrown into a shower by the crew, who washed off the paint.

== Release and marketing ==
During season two, the series aired on Sundays at 8:30 p.m. EST. The season premiered on the Fox Network in the United States on November 5, 2000, and concluded on May 20, 2001, with a total of 25 episodes. To promote the premiere, in which Dewey's whereabouts from "Waterpark" were to be revealed, the Fox Network launched the "Where's Dewey?" marketing campaign during the summer hiatus, where clips of Dewey wandering around the country were released to the public. A website, wheresdewey.com, allowed participants to guess where Dewey was based on the videos, and win a contest. The season was set to be released on Region 1 DVD in the fall of 2003, following the success of the season one boxset, released in October 2000, but was cancelled due to the high costs of music clearances, a factor they didn't consider when getting licensed music for the season. It was released on Region 4 DVD in Australia on September 4, 2013.

== Reception ==
=== Ratings ===
Overall, season two averaged around 14.50 million viewers. The season premiere, "Traffic Jam", garnered 15.52 million viewers. Soon thereafter, the next episode, "Halloween Approximately", attracted 6 million less viewers at 9.18, staying the lowest of the series until the twentieth episode of the next season, "Jury Duty", at 5.89 million. The season concluded on 13.77 million viewers with "Flashback", and "Surgery" was the most watched episode, obtaining 17.55 million.

=== Critical response ===
The second season of Malcolm in the Middle received generally positive reviews from critics. David Bianculli, writing for New York Daily News, praised the premiere, highlight Kaczmarek's performance, Dewey's subplot, and how "genuinely goofy" the season proved itself it be right from the start. Mike Lipton of People commended the series for its "delightful anarchy", writing highly of "Traffic Ticket" and "Lois' Birthday", and asserting that "Malcolm [is] still on top" as his favorite series from Fox at the time.

TVLine's Blair Marnell selected "Krelboyne Girl" as the season's greatest and most representative episode, noting that Cynthia, who makes her first appearance in the episode, helped lay the groundwork for Malcolm's future relationships, also enjoying the cold open of Malcolm setting Reese up for a prank as "one of the best". Brenton Stewart of Comic Book Resources ranked season two as the second best season, writing that the season helped define each character and their personalities, such as Hal being just as childish as his sons, and the experimentation with episodes like "Bowling" and "The Bully", the latter exploring Reese and expanding on his role in the series.

A behind-the-scenes photo from the set of "Bowling". The episode received critical acclaim, as is considered one of the best episodes of the series.

The twentieth episode, "Bowling", has received critical acclaim since release. Emily St. James of The A.V. Club's listed it as one of the "best TV episodes of the decade" for its "wild stylistic innovations", and the strong acting of Cranston and Kaczmarek. Similarly, critic Richard Chachowski, for Thought Catalog, called it one of the series' best, praising its unique premise, and "perfec[t]" showcase of Hal and Lois' character traits and differences. /Film writer Mike Bedard called "Bowling" both the best episode of the series, and one of the most creative television episodes from the 2000s. He praised its cinematography and humor, and also listed "Traffic Jam" as the series' second best episode, feeling that it built off of how "Waterpark" explored the family's personalities, while "Traffic Jam" was about their "superegos", also praising its ability to tie together multiple different subplots. Additionally, "Bowling" is the highest rated episode of Malcolm in the Middle on IMDb.

=== Awards and nominations ===
Muniz and Kaczmarek were nominated for Best Actor and Actress in a Television Series Musical or Comedy at the 59th Golden Globes, but both lost to Charlie Sheen for Spin City and Sarah Jessica Parker for Sex and the City, respectively. At the 13th Producers Guild of America Awards, the series was honored with a nomination for the Award for Best Episodic Comedy. However, it ultimately lost to Sex and the City.

"Bowling" won two Primetime Emmy Awards for Outstanding Directing and Writing for a Comedy Series for Todd Holland and Alex Reid, respectively, in 2001; the win for directing competed against another episode from the season, "Flashback". Leading on from this, Holland won the Directors Guild of America Award for Outstanding Directing for a Comedy Series in 2002.

Frankie Muniz was nominated for the Primetime Emmy Award for Outstanding Lead Actor in a Comedy Series, as was Kaczmarek for Outstanding Lead Actress. Also at the Primetime Emmys, Linwood Boomer, Bob Stevens, Gary Murphy, Neil Thompson, Alan J. Higgins, Michael Glouberman, Andrew Orenstein, Todd Holland, Alex Reid, James Simons, Ken Kwapis, and Jeff Melman were nominated for Outstanding Comedy Series. Loggia and Leachman received nominations for Outstanding Guest Actor and Actress in a Comedy Series.
