= Dana Davis =

American actress

- Born: Davenport, Iowa, U.S.
- Education: Loyola Marymount University
- Occupations: Actress; voice actress; novelist
- Years active: 2000–present

Dana Davis is an American actress and novelist known for playing Monica Dawson on the NBC series Heroes (2007), Chastity Church on the ABC Family television series 10 Things I Hate About You (2009–10) and Carmen Phillips on the TNT series Franklin & Bash (2011–2013). She is an accomplished voice actress whose credits include Star vs. the Forces of Evil, She-Ra and the Princesses of Power, and the role of Kit on Craig of the Creek.

== Biography ==
Davis was born in Davenport, Iowa, and attended North High School. She is a trained violinist and attended Loyola Marymount University where she earned her bachelor's degree in Music in 2006.

Davis appeared alongside teen actress Hilary Duff in Raise Your Voice. She has also appeared in Veronica Mars, That's So Raven, The O.C., Gilmore Girls, Point Pleasant, Pushing Daisies, and Hidden Palms.

In July 2007, The Hollywood Reporter announced that Davis would be joining the second season of the TV series Heroes, as Monica Dawson, who was described as a "young hero" willing to "give up everything to help the people around her". The character is the niece of D.L. Hawkins and first cousin of Micah Sanders. She has the power of muscle mimicry, meaning she can master instantly any physical skill she witnesses.

Davis played the role of Peyton in the hit film Coach Carter (2005) alongside Ashanti. She also starred as Lisa Hines in Prom Night (2008). Davis played Chastity Church in the ABC Family series 10 Things I Hate About You (Gabrielle Union played the character in the film) appearing in all 20 episodes. According to series creator Carter Covington, Davis asked out of her contract after the 20 episodes to explore new career opportunities, so Chastity was written out as transferring to a new school; the show was cancelled shortly after the episode aired.

Davis is the author of several young adult novels. She uses "Dana L. Davis" as her pen name. Her debut novel Tiffany Sly Lives Here Now was released in 2018 and published by Inkyard Press. Her second novel The Voice In My Head was released in 2019 and her third novel Roman and Jewel was released in 2021. Both were also published by Inkyard Press. Davis's fourth novel Somebody I Used to Know was released in 2022 and published by Skyscape Publishing. Her fifth novel Fake Famous was released in 2023 by the same publisher.

== Filmography ==
=== Film ===
Year	Title	Role	Notes
2002	No Prom for Cindy	Kris	Short film
2004	Raise Your Voice	Denise Gilmore	
2005	Coach Carter	Peyton	
2008	Prom Night	Lisa Hines	
2010	Nick of Time	Stephanie	Short
2014	High Moon	Yama Winehart	TV movie
2015	Right Girl	Jackie Spencer	Movie
2016	Nerdland	Detective Cassidy	Voice
2023	Craig Before the Creek	Kit	Voice
2023	Bad Connection	Nina	Movie

=== Television ===
Year	Title	Role	Notes
2000	The Steve Harvey Show		Episode: "Player, Interrupted"
2001	Boston Public	Marie Ronning	2 episodes
2001	One on One	Girl #1 / Meg	Episode: "Playing Possum"
2002	Malcolm in the Middle	Chandra	Episode: "Poker #2"
2003	Joan of Arcadia	Nicky	Episode: "Bringeth It On"
2004	That's So Raven	Jasmine	Episode: "The Road to Audition"
2005	Point Pleasant	Lucinda	3 episodes
2005	Cold Case	Mathilde Jefferson	Episode: "Strange Fruit"
2005	Testing Bob	Ryan	Movie
2005	Gilmore Girls	Althea	2 episodes
2005–2006	Veronica Mars	Cora Briggs	2 episodes
2005–2006	The O.C.	Madison	2 episodes; uncredited
2006	CSI: Miami	Julia Hill	Episode: "Deviant"
2006–2007	The Nine	Felicia Jones	13 episodes
2007	Hidden Palms	Michelle Meadows	Episode: "Pilot"
2007	Heroes	Monica Dawson	6 episodes
2008	Pushing Daisies	Barb	Episode: "Frescorts"
2009	Criminal Minds	Andrea Harris	Episode: "Soul Mates"
2009	Relative Stranger	Denise Clemons	TV movie
2009	Bones	Michelle Welton	Episode: "The Doctor in the Den"; later replaced by Tiffany Hines
2009–2010	10 Things I Hate About You	Chastity Church	20 episodes
2010	Grey's Anatomy	Gretchen	Episode: "Superfreak"
2011	Body of Proof	Dora Mason	Episode: "Gross Anatomy"
2011–2013	Franklin & Bash	Carmen Phillips	Main role
2012	Motorcity	Claire	Voice, recurring role
2012	CSI: Crime Scene Investigation	Amanda Pedroia / Neon Kitty	Episode: "Wild Flowers"
2014	Glee	Tesla	Episode: "Bash"
2015	Phineas and Ferb	Teen Holly	Voice, episode: "Act Your Age"
2016–2019	Star vs. the Forces of Evil	Kelly, Lady Whosits	Voice, recurring role (21 episodes)
2018–2024	Craig of the Creek	Kit	Voice
2018–2019	She-Ra and the Princesses of Power	Lonnie, Busgirl, Bright Moon Guard #4	Voice, 16 episodes
2019-present	The Morning Show	Christine	Guest Role
2019	Suburban Swingers Club	Lori Mallick	Television film (Lifetime)
2021-2022	Amphibia	Jess	Voice, 3 episodes
2022	Tales of the Jedi	Village Sister	Voice, episode: "Resolve"

=== Music videos ===
Year	Title	Artist(s)	Ref.
2009	"I Want You to Want Me" (10 Things I Hate About You version)	KSM	
