= What'z Up? =

- Country of origin: United States
- Original language: English
- No. of seasons: 1

Production
- Producer: Willie Barnett
- Production company: ZM Productions

What'z Up? is an entertainment magazine show dealing with teen issues.

The show was originally broadcast in the United States in 1994. It was hosted by R. J. Williams and co-hosted by Bianca Lawson, Christopher Masterson and Katie Barnhill. The show was produced by Willie Barnett and co-executive produced by George Zaloom and Les Mayfield in association with their production company ZM Productions.
