= Bowling (Malcolm in the Middle) =

- Malcolm in the Middle episode
- Malcolm (left) is annoyed by Lois in the reality where she takes him and Reese bowling.
- Episode no.: Season 2 Episode 20
- Directed by: Todd Holland
- Written by: Alex Reid
- Production code: 06-00-223
- Original air date: April 1, 2001

Episode chronology
← Previous "Tutoring Reese"	Next → "Malcolm vs. Reese"
- Malcolm in the Middle season 2

"Bowling" is the twentieth episode of the second season of the American television comedy series Malcolm in the Middle. The 36th episode overall, it was written by Alex Reid and directed by Todd Holland. It originally aired on the Fox Network in the United States on April 1, 2001. The episode's plot serves as a direct parody of the 1998 film Sliding Doors, and the initial idea for it came from a writers retreat that Reid was on.

In the episode, two separate realities are shown: one where Malcolm (Frankie Muniz) and Reese (Justin Berfield) are driven to a bowling party by Lois (Jane Kaczmarek), while a grounded Dewey (Erik Per Sullivan) is watched by Hal (Bryan Cranston) at home; and another where the parental roles are reversed.

Since release, "Bowling" has received positive reception from critics, who have frequently hailed it as the best episode of the series, and one of the greatest television episodes ever made. Reid and Holland later received Emmy Awards for their work on the episode, and Muniz was nominated for an Emmy Award for Outstanding Lead Actor in a Comedy Series. Retrospectively, the episode's themes have received critical and scholarly analysis.

== Plot ==
The episode presents two alternating versions of the following plot: Malcolm (Frankie Muniz) and his brother Reese (Justin Berfield) are going to a bowling party, with one of their parents having to drive them, while the other stays home with the grounded youngest child, Dewey (Erik Per Sullivan)

=== First reality ===
Mother Lois (Jane Kaczmarek) takes the boys to the bowling party. Right away, both Malcolm and Reese notice a girl at their party named Beth (Alex McKenna). Lois soon learns that there are no adults chaperoning, and decides to stay to chaperone it herself. Reese impresses Beth, but is repeatedly interrupted before he can tell her a joke he claims she will enjoy. Malcolm does terribly at bowling, and Lois' overbearing encouragement only makes the ridiculing from others worse. When he finally stands up to her, he only embarrasses himself by missing an easy shot. Beth is put off by Reese' taunting, and kisses Malcolm, finding his courage endearing. However, Lois breaks it up and takes everyone home. Meanwhile, father Hal (Bryan Cranston) watches Dewey at home, and acts empathetic towards him. Dewey makes Hal read him a bedtime story, which puts Hal to sleep. Up past his bedtime, Dewey orders pizza and watches R-rated movies.

=== Second reality ===
Hal drives the boys to the party, and sends them off while he takes a lane to himself. Reese tells Beth his joke, where he splashes her with soda, and she leaves upset. Malcolm does well at bowling, and Beth is impressed with his skills. Reese, jealous, tries to throw a bowling ball at Malcolm, but misses and hits a large man, who furiously chases him. Hal makes a strike and attempts a perfect game by repeating his actions before the strike, including having the same people present. Malcolm leads Beth behind the bowling arena to kiss, but his shirt catches in a pinsetter, and tumbles onto Hal's lane, ruining the game. Hal angrily takes Malcolm to the car and orders Reese to come out of hiding in the photo booth. The large man notices Reese and beats him up. Concurrently, Lois watches Dewey, who tries and fails to fool her. When he appears to give up, she suspects he is plotting something, and isn't sure how to deal with the situation. Eventually, Lois lets Dewey watch television, but only C-SPAN, and neither is sure who won.

== Production ==
"Bowling" was directed by Todd Holland, and written by Alex Reid in his third writing credit for the series. The script for the episode was completed on December 11, 2000, and Reid was given final writing credits on March 8, 2001.

According to Reid, the plot for the episode came about while he was on a writers retreat with the series' staff. He stated that he knew when the episode was being created that it "had the potential to be very interesting". Its plot serves as a direct parody of the 1998 film Sliding Doors, in which two different timelines with the same characters are similarly explored. The X-Files had previously done a similar episode also revolving around alternate realities, and Dan Harmon cited the episode for inspiration of an episode of his show Community, "Remedial Chaos Theory".

== Analysis ==
Critic Greg Smith noted that the kind of "technical panache" that the episode's directing had to do to properly parody Sliding Doors made it unique for both the series and network television, with Den of Geek's Christian Kriticos adding that it was "ambitious" for its time. Through its alternate universes, the episode serves as a commentary on "how seemingly inconsequential acts can shape a person's life", where acts he does or does not do in one reality can change when he does or does not do them in the other. Furthermore, Richard Chachowski wrote that the episode's juxtaposing narrative had a uniquely "loose linear progression…emphasizing how the slightest differences can impact the course of a single night". Chachowski also noted it for showcasing the difference in Hal and Lois' characters, with different reactions to similar events that prove their attitudes to be completely different. Author and historian Jeffrey Sconce viewed "Bowling" as the series taking the television landscape to a different level that it had rarely explored before—similar to the Seinfeld episode "The Betrayal", or ER's "Ambush"—taking the "innocuous premise" of Reese and Malcolm going bowling, and using to present different antithetical approaches to storytelling. He also asserted that it left the series with an "anomaly" in its timeline, never actually revealing which reality is the true one, or if its events happened at all. Craig Tomashoff of The New York Times discussed the episode on a cover story regarding television families, asserting that it contributed to a trend of television sitcoms making the father characters more childish, as seen by Hal not paying any attention to Reese or Malcolm when he takes them bowling, rather indulging in his own game.

== Release and reception ==
"Bowling" first aired on the Fox Network on April 1, 2001. In the United States, the episode was watched by a total of 13.71 million viewers during its original broadcast. It marked a decrease of over one million viewers from the previous episode, "Tutoring Reese", which aired several weeks prior on March 11, and was watched by 14.90 million people.

"Bowling" has received positive reviews since its airing, and is widely considered the series' finest installment. The episode was named among Emily St. James of The A.V. Club's "best TV episodes of the decade", praising its "wild stylistic innovations", which she felt emphasized the strong acting of Cranston and Kaczmarek. Chachowski, writing for Thought Catalog, listed it as one of the series' best, praising the episode for its unique spin on a generic premise, as well as for "perfectly" showcasing Hal and Lois' characters, asserting that "Whoever came up with the idea behind ["Bowling"] deserves a raise or promotion of some kind".

Labeling it as the single greatest episode of Malcolm in the Middle, Soap Central's Aditya Sridhar called the execution of the plot "genius". He also highlighted the editing, ending his review by stating "Honestly, they should teach this one in film schools". Kriticos placed it fourth on his list, highlighting the character-based humor as the reason for the episode's acclaim with both critics and fans, with Malcolm losing an easy game and Hal's dance before he plays serving as examples of such.

=== Accolades ===
The episode was nominated for, and won, two Primetime Emmy Awards for Outstanding Directing and Writing for a Comedy Series for Todd Holland and Alex Reid, respectively, in 2001. Frankie Muniz was also nominated for the Primetime Emmy Award for Outstanding Lead Actor in a Comedy Series for his work on the episode, but lost to the Will & Grace episode "Lows in the Mid-Eighties". Leading on from this, Holland won the Directors Guild of America Award for Outstanding Directing for a Comedy Series in 2002.
