= Dan Martin (actor) =

American actor (born 1951)

- Born: Jacob Daniel Martin; December 22, 1951 (age 74)
- Occupation: Actor
- Years active: 1988–present
- Spouse: Ella Joyce (m. 1989)

Jacob Daniel Martin (born December 22, 1951) is an American actor. He has been featured in numerous roles, primarily playing law enforcement characters or in movies about law enforcement, notably as Bradley Baker (a recurring police deputy chief) in The Bold and the Beautiful. For his role he received an NAACP Image Award for Outstanding Actor in a Daytime Drama Series nomination in 2009.

Martin married actress Ella Joyce in 1989.

== Filmography ==
- Rin Tin Tin: K-9 Cop (1988–1993, TV Series) as Lou Adams
- A Man Called Hawk (1989, TV Series) as Jackie Stubbs
- Casualties of War (1989) as Sergeant Hawthorne
- Doctor Doctor (1990, TV Series) as Dr. Martin Tomkins
- Tales from the Crypt (1991, TV Series) as 'Snaz'
- Roc (1991, TV Series) as George
- Jake and the Fatman (1992, TV Series) as Sergeant Lincoln 'Linc' Connell
- Sleepwalkers (1992) as Andy Simpson
- Dream On (1992, TV Series) as Barry
- L.A. Law (1993, TV Series) as Officer Walters
- Laurel Avenue (1993, TV Mini-Series) as Woodrow Arnett
- Hangin' with Mr. Cooper (1993, TV Series) as Vince
- Melrose Place (1994, TV Series) as Detective
- The Stand (1994, TV Mini-Series) as Rich Moffat
- Beverly Hills Cop III (1994) as Cooper
- The Wayans Bros. (1995, TV Series) as Cop #1
- Heat (1995) as Harry Dieter
- Campus Cops (1996, TV Series) as Announcer
- ER (1996, TV Series) as Lieutenant
- Nowhere Man (1996, TV Series) as Father Ray
- Pacific Blue (1996, TV Series) Lieutenant Douglas
- Friends (1996, TV Series) (uncredited)
- NYPD Blue (1996, TV Series) as Bouncer
- Fox Hunt (1996) as Croupier
- High Tide (1997, TV Series)
- Goode Behavior (1997, TV Series) as Lloyd
- The Pretender (1997, TV Series) as Dr. Fletcher
- Executive Target (1997) as Carter
- Nothing to Lose (1997) as L.A.P.D. Sergeant
- Profiler (1997, TV Series)
- The Practice (1997, TV Series) as Officer Tedesco
- The Good News (1997, TV Series) as Lieutenant Hecker
- The Bold and the Beautiful (1997–1998, 2001–2004, 2006–2013, 2015–2018, 2021–Present, TV Series) as Bradley Baker
- Prey (1998, TV Series) as Prosecutor
- In the House (1998, TV Series) as Bentley Langford
- NightMan (1998, TV Series) as Minister
- Rush Hour (1998) as FBI Gate Guard #2
- Oh Baby (1998, TV Series) as Daniel
- NewsRadio (1998, TV Series) as Inspector Ron Jarek
- Clueless (1999, TV Series) as Referee
- Pensacola: Wings of Gold (1999, TV Series)
- Family Law (1999, TV Series) as Ed Adams
- Dawson's Creek (1999, TV Series) as Megan Whoopie
- Roswell (1999–2000, TV Series) as Principal
- Dancing in September (2000) as Tommy's Father
- 18 Wheels of Justice (2000, TV Series) as Reverend Maurice Haybrook
- Get Real (2000, TV Series) as Coach Wilson
- The Invisible Man (2000, TV Series)
- Ally McBeal (2000, TV Series) as Principal Jollie
- That's Life
- Leprechaun in the Hood (2000) as Jackie D
- The Man Who Wasn't There (2001) as Bailiff
- Sacred Is the Flesh (2001)
- The Guardian (2001, TV Series) as Police Officer
- Grounded for Life (2001–2002, TV Series) Mr. Pennix
- JAG (2001–2004, TV Series) as Senior Chief
- Angel Blade (2002) as Lieutenant Paul Jackson
- Crocodile 2: Death Swamp (2002) as Pilot
- Enough (2002) as FBI Agent #1
- Groom Lake (2002) as Captain Morgan
- Presidio Med (2002, TV Series)
- Off Centre (2002, TV Series) as Dr. Mumford
- Robbery Homicide Division (2002, TV Series) as Joseph Vigna
- Malcolm in the Middle (2002–2006, TV Series) as Malik
- Everybody Loves Raymond (2003, TV Series) as Policeman
- The Handler (2003, TV Series)
- Judging Amy (2003–2004, TV Series) as Detective Avery / Detective
- Three Way (2004) as Patrolman
- Clubhouse (2004, TV Series) as Security Guard #1
- Cold Case (2005, TV Series) as Maurice Banks
- View in Black & White (2005) as The Father
- CSI: Crime Scene Investigation (2005, TV Series) as Plant Nursery Worker
- Sleeper Cell (2005, TV Series) as Ernest Jefferson
- Gridiron Gang (2006) as Terrell Rollins
- Boston Legal (2006, TV Series) as Detective Russell Roberts
- Love... & Other 4 Letter Words (2007) as Lee Earl
- All of Us (2007, TV Series) as The Quizz Master
- Bones (2007, TV Series) as Major
- Burn Notice (2007, TV Series) as Dan Siebels
- The Nation (2009) as Bimbi
- Bob Funk (2009) as Mark
- Lie to Me (2009, TV Series) as Conrad Ricks
- Just Peck (2009) as Coach
- Numbers (2009–2010, TV Series) as Detective Jack Cates
- NCIS (2012, TV Series) as Mail Carrier
- Franklin & Bash (2012, TV Series) as Donald French
- 10 Cent Pistol (2014) as Detective Dassin
- How to Get Away with Murder (2015, TV Series) as Janitor Joe
- First (2015, TV Series) as Walter
- The Grinder (2015, TV Series) as 'Murph' Murphy
- Code Black (2015, TV Series) as Donald
- Bachelors (2015) as Minister
- Criminal Minds (2016, TV Series) as Detective McLeary
- The Originals (2016–2018, TV Series) as Hollis
- School of Rock (2016, TV Series) as Gary
- Fresh Off the Boat (2017, TV Series) as Clyde Minter
- Famous in Love (2017, TV Series) as Dennis
- S.W.A.T. (2017, TV Series) as Dell
- Ten Days in the Valley (2017, TV Series) as Morgan
- Craig Ross Jr.'s Monogamy (2018) as Michael
- Nightmare Cinema (2018) as Dr. Michaelson
- Mom (2018, TV Series) as Juan
- Kidding (2018, TV Series) as Joe
- The Resident (2019, TV Series) as Floyd Washington
- 9-1-1 (2019, TV Series) as Doctor
- Better Call Saul (2020, TV Series) as Judge Xavier Parson
- Malcolm in the Middle: Life's Still Unfair (2026, TV Series) as Malik
