= Christopher Masterson =

American actor (born 1980)

- Born: Christopher Kennedy Masterson; January 22, 1980 (age 46); Long Island, New York, U.S.
- Occupations: Actor; disc jockey
- Years active: 1988–present
- Spouse: Yolanda Pecoraro (m. 2019)
- Children: 2
- Relatives: Danny Masterson (brother); Jordan Masterson (maternal half-brother); Alanna Masterson (maternal half-sister); Angus T. Jones (cousin)

Christopher Kennedy Masterson (born January 22, 1980) is an American actor and disc jockey known best for his role as Francis on the Fox sitcom Malcolm in the Middle (2000–2006). His younger half-siblings, Alanna Masterson and Jordan Masterson are also actors. His older brother is Danny Masterson.

== Career ==
Masterson played Geoff in the direct-to-video movie Dragonheart: A New Beginning (2000), the sequel to Dragonheart. Masterson is best known for his role as Francis, the trouble-making oldest brother of Frankie Muniz's title character in the Fox sitcom Malcolm in the Middle. He took on the role for seven seasons, from 2000 to 2006. In 2003, he played Edward in MTV's Wuthering Heights. Masterson portrayed a lead character in the films Waterborne, Made for Each Other and Intellectual Property. He also played a supporting role in Scary Movie 2. He guest starred in three episodes of That '70s Show, alongside his brother, Danny. In the USA Network television series White Collar, he played Josh Roland in the episode "Where There's a Will". He also played Scotty O'Neal in the movie My Best Friend's Wedding. In 2012, Masterson had a guest role on the TBS series Men at Work as a concierge named Archie. His brother, Danny Masterson, played Milo on the show, but the two did not share any scenes together.

== Personal life ==
Masterson was born on Long Island, New York, the son of Carol Masterson, a manager, and Peter Masterson, an insurance agent. Masterson, like his brother Danny Masterson, is a follower of Scientology. The two have invested in restaurants together. He also has a half-sister, actress Alanna Masterson, and a half-brother, actor Jordan Masterson. Masterson was in a relationship with Laura Prepon from 1999 to 2007, a co-star of That '70s Show alongside his brother.

On June 25, 2019, Masterson married actress Yolanda Pecoraro. In April 2021, she gave birth to their daughter.

== Filmography ==
Film
Year	Title	Role	Notes
1992	Singles	Young Steve Dunne	
1992	Mom I Can Do It	Danny Morris	
1995	Cutthroat Island	Bowen	
1996	Sunchaser	Jimmy Reynolds	
1997	Campfire Tales	Eric	
1997	My Best Friend's Wedding	Scotty O'Neal	Credited as Chris Masterson
1997	Ecce Pirate	Young Ecce	Short film
1998	Girl	Richard	
1998	American History X	Daryl Dawson	
2000	Dragonheart: A New Beginning	Geoffrey	
2001	Nice Guys Finish Last	Billy	Short film
2001	Scary Movie 2	Buddy Sanderson	Credited as Chris Masterson
2002	Hold On		Short film
2003	Wuthering Heights	Edward	
2005	Waterborne	Zach	
2006	Intellectual Property	Paul	
2007	The Masquerade	Ken	Short film
2008	The Art of Travel	Conner Layne	
2009	Made for Each Other	Dan	Credited as Christopher Kennedy Masterson
2010	Impulse	David	Short film
2012	Electric Sheep	Android	Short film
2013	Chapman	Paul Holt	
2015	Bad Roomies	Trevor	
2016	Urge	Guy on Ferry	Uncredited role
2019	I'd Like to Be Alone Now	Eddie	
2019	Beneath the Leaves	George Middleton	

Television
Year	Title	Role	Notes
1988	Hiroshima Maiden	Timmy Bennett	TV movie
1993	Murphy Brown	Young Avery Brown	Episode "One"
1994	Dr. Quinn, Medicine Woman	Lewis Bing	Episode: "Just One Lullaby"
1994	The Road Home	Sawyer Matson	6 episodes
1994	What'z Up?	Himself	Co-host
1996	The Client	Tommy Powers	Episode: "Private Lives"
1997	Touched by an Angel	Doc	Episode: "Children of the Night"
1998	The Pretender	Chris Conti	Episode: "Toy Surprise"
1998	Millennium	Landon Bryce	Episode: "A Room with No View"
2000–2006	Malcolm in the Middle	Francis	Main role
2001	Strange Frequency	Todd	Television film
2002	That '70s Show	Todd	3 episodes
2002	The Dead Zone	Todd Paley	Episode: "Quality of Life"
2003–2004	The Wild Thornberrys	Shane G. (voice)	Recurring role (season 5)
2004	MADtv	Lawyer	1 episode
2011	White Collar	Josh Roland	Episode: "Where There's a Will"
2012	Men at Work	Hotel Clerk	Episode: "Toilet of Eden"
2013	Onion News Empire	Sam West	Episode: "Pilot"
2014	Haven	Morgan Gardener	2 episodes
2016	Kat Fight!	Alex	Television short film
2017	Mystic Cosmic Patrol	Jack/Blue Patrolman	Episode: "Potty Mouth: Part 1"
2026	Malcolm in the Middle: Life's Still Unfair	Francis	Main role
