= Alex Reid (screenwriter) =

American screenwriter

Alex Reid (born in 1965 in Cocoa, FL) is an American television producer and screenwriter.

== Life and career ==
Alex Reid is an Emmy-winning writer and director. He received a degree in electrical engineering at Clemson University. He started as a stand-up comedian in San Francisco but after moving to Los Angeles he transitioned to writing for television in the late ’90s. While writing on Malcolm in the Middle, he won an Emmy for Outstanding Writing for a Comedy Series for his episode, “Bowling”. Also, while working on Malcolm in the Middle, Reid began his directing career. Besides Malcolm, he’s directed episodes of The Middle, The Mindy Project, Brooklyn Nine-Nine, Life in Pieces, Odd Mom Out, Up All Night, The Michael J. Fox Show, Life in Pieces, Young Sheldon and The Unicorn.
