= Justin Berfield =

American actor (born 1986)

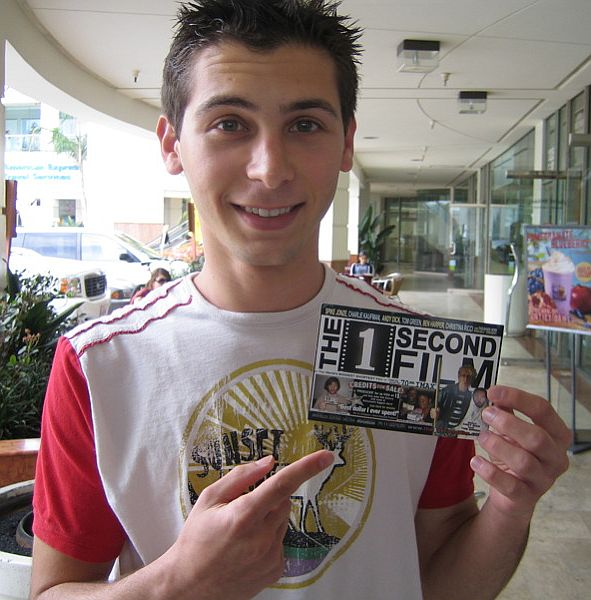
- Berfield in 2005
- Born: Justin Tyler Berfield; February 25, 1986 (age 40); Agoura Hills, California, U.S.
- Occupations: Actor; producer; writer
- Years active: 1991–present
- Spouse: Liza Almeida (m. 2017)
- Children: 2

Justin Tyler Berfield (born February 25, 1986) is an American actor, writer and producer. He is known for his portrayals of Reese on the family sitcom Malcolm in the Middle (2000–2006) and Ross Malloy on The WB sitcom Unhappily Ever After (1995–1999). Berfield was Chief Creative Officer of Virgin Produced, a film and television development, packaging, and production company announced in 2010 by the Virgin Group.

== Early life ==
Berfield was born on February 25, 1986, in Agoura Hills, California, to Gail Berfield (née Stark) and Eric "Rick" Berfield. He has an older brother, Lorne.

He attended Brookside Elementary School in Oak Park, and Agoura High School before homeschooling at age of 15.

== Acting career ==
Berfield's first screen appearance was in a Folgers coffee commercial at age five. He went on to appear in 20 other nationally broadcast American commercials as a young child. His TV debut came in the short-lived series The Good Life (1994) in which he co-starred with Drew Carey. Berfield also made appearances in the TV shows Hardball, The Boys Are Back, and The Mommies (1994–1995).

Berfield's first long-running TV role was as Ross Malloy in Unhappily Ever After (1995–1999), in which he appeared in 100 episodes. In 1995, he (then aged 9) was one of 3000 juvenile actors who auditioned for the role of the young Anakin Skywalker in Star Wars: Episode I – The Phantom Menace.

Berfield's big breakthrough role came in 1999 when Linwood Boomer cast him to play Reese, the trouble-making older brother of Frankie Muniz's title character on the Fox sitcom Malcolm in the Middle (in reality, Berfield is nearly three months younger than Muniz), which premiered on January 9, 2000. He appeared in all 151 episodes of that series. The original run of Malcolm in the Middle ended on May 14, 2006. Berfield moved to Colorado after the series was over as he wanted a change of scenery. He also mentions that he prioritized staying home with his child and was not in-demand for new roles.

Berfield remained active for another six years, concentrating on production work; in February 2025, he confirmed in an Instagram post that he would return for the reboot of the series. He also made a one-off appearance in the series Sons of Tucson in 2010.

== Charity work ==
In 2001, Berfield was asked to serve as a National Youth Ambassador for Ronald McDonald House Charities, in which he participated for three years until turning 18. He has been active with St. Jude Children's Research Hospital and most recently Virgin Unite, the charitable arm of Virgin Group.

== Personal life ==
Berfield is Jewish. He has two children with his wife Liza Almeida, whom he married in 2017.

== Filmography ==
=== Film ===
Year	Title	Role	Notes
1998	Mom, Can I Keep Her?	Timmy Blair	
1999	Invisible Mom 2	Eddie Brown	
1999	The Kid with X-Ray Eyes	Bobby Taylor	
2001	Max Keeble's Big Move	Caption Writer	
2002	Who's Your Daddy?	Danny Hughes	
2006	Romance and Cigarettes	Anthony	Producer
2007	Blonde Ambition	Lucas Blair	Producer

=== Television ===
Year	Title	Role	Notes
1994	The Good Life	Bob Bowman	Main role; 13 episodes
1994	Hardball	Kid	2 episodes
1994	The Boys Are Back	Timmy Flint	4 episodes
1995–1999	Unhappily Ever After	Ross Malloy	Main role; 100 episodes
1996	Duckman	Bill	Episode: "Exile in Guyville"
2000–2006	Malcolm in the Middle	Reese	Main role; 151 episodes
2001	The Nightmare Room	Josh Ryan	Episode: "Tangled Web"
2002–2004	Kim Possible	Gill	Voice, 2 episodes
2004	The Fairly OddParents	Ving	Voice, episode: "Crash Nebula"
2005	Filthy Rich: Cattle Drive	Stan	Producer, screenplay
2007	The Pet Detective	Lucas	Television film; producer and director
2010	Sons of Tucson	Barry	1 episode; also producer
2012	Virgin Produced: Comedy Vault	Virgil	Television film; producer
2026	Malcolm in the Middle: Life's Still Unfair	Reese	4 episodes

== Awards ==
Awards
Year	Result	Award	Category	Nominated work
1998	Nominated	Young Artist Awards	Best Performance in a TV Comedy Series: Supporting Young Actor	Unhappily Ever After
1999	Nominated	Young Artist Awards	Best Performance in a TV Comedy Series: Supporting Young Actor	Unhappily Ever After
1999	Nominated	YoungStar Awards	Best Performance by a Young Actor in a Comedy TV Series	Unhappily Ever After
2000	Won	YoungStar Awards	Best Young Ensemble Cast: Television	Malcolm in the Middle
2001	Nominated	Young Artist Awards	Best Ensemble in a TV Series (Comedy or Drama)	Malcolm in the Middle
2002	Nominated	Young Artist Awards	Best Performance in a Feature Film: Supporting Young Actor	Max Keeble's Big Move
2002	Nominated	Young Artist Awards	Best Ensemble in a TV Series (Comedy or Drama)	Malcolm in the Middle
2003	Won	Young Artist Awards	Best Ensemble in a TV Series (Comedy or Drama)	Malcolm in the Middle
2003	Nominated	Young Artist Awards	Best Performance in a TV Series (Comedy or Drama): Supporting Young Actor	Malcolm in the Middle
