= List of Malcolm in the Middle episodes =

Episodes of American television series

200x200

Malcolm in the Middle is an American television sitcom created by Linwood Boomer for the Fox Broadcasting Company. The series follows a dysfunctional, working-class family, focusing on child prodigy Malcolm (Frankie Muniz), who also narrates the series by addressing the audience. Other main characters include Malcolm's mother Lois (Jane Kaczmarek), father Hal (Bryan Cranston), older brothers Francis (Christopher Masterson) and Reese (Justin Berfield), and younger brother Dewey (Erik Per Sullivan). Later in the series, two more children are added to the family: Jamie (James and Lukas Rodriguez) and an unnamed child that Lois is pregnant with.

Originally pitched to UPN, Malcolm in the Middle was initially planned for the 1998–99 television season, but the network lost interest in it. Soon after, when Fox's then-president of entertainment Doug Herzog heard about the project, he quickly greenlit it, and decided to wait until mid-season to air it; this ultimately contributed to its success, alongside airing directly after The Simpsons. Over the course of seven seasons, the series aired a total of 151 episodes.

The first season began airing on January 9, 2000, and aired through May 21, consisting of 16 episodes. Ratings for the season were high, with the premiere garnering 22.35 million viewers, before peaking at 23.24 million with the second episode the following week. The second season premiered a few months later on November 5, 2000, running until May 20, 2001. Malcolm in the Middle continued to air regularly until its seventh and final season, which began on September 30, 2005, and ended on May 14, 2006, with the finale netting 7.38 million viewers. A four-part revival miniseries entitled Malcolm in the Middle: Life's Still Unfair premiered on the streaming service Hulu on April 10, 2026.

== Series overview ==
Season	Episodes	Originally released	
Season	Episodes	First released	Last released
1	16	January 9, 2000	May 21, 2000
2	25	November 5, 2000	May 20, 2001
3	22	November 11, 2001	May 12, 2002
4	22	November 3, 2002	May 18, 2003
5	22	November 2, 2003	May 23, 2004
6	22	November 7, 2004	May 15, 2005
7	22	September 30, 2005	May 14, 2006

== Episodes ==
=== Season 1 (2000) ===
Season 1 episodes
No. overall	No. in season	Title	Directed by	Written by	Original release date	Prod. code	U.S. viewers (millions)
1	1	"Pilot"	Todd Holland	Linwood Boomer	January 9, 2000	10012-99-179	22.35
2	2	"Red Dress"	Arlene Sanford	Alan J. Higgins	January 16, 2000	06-99-103	23.24
3	3	"Home Alone 4"	Todd Holland	Michael Glouberman & Andrew Orenstein	January 23, 2000	06-99-106	19.29
4	4	"Shame"	Nick Marck	David Richardson	February 6, 2000	06-99-107	16.93
5	5	"Malcolm Babysits"	Jeff Melman	Maggie Bandur & Pang-Ni Landrum	February 13, 2000	06-99-105	18.05
6	6	"Sleepover"	Ken Kwapis	Dan Kopelman	February 20, 2000	06-99-110	15.90
7	7	"Francis Escapes"	Todd Holland	Linwood Boomer	February 27, 2000	06-99-101	16.06
8	8	"Krelboyne Picnic"	Todd Holland	Michael Glouberman & Andrew Orenstein	March 12, 2000	06-99-109	14.19
9	9	"Lois vs. Evil"	Todd Holland	Jack Amiel & Michael Begler	March 19, 2000	06-99-104	16.29
10	10	"Stock Car Races"	Todd Holland	David Richardson	April 2, 2000	06-99-102	13.12
11	11	"Funeral"	Arlene Sanford	Maggie Bandur & Pang-Ni Landrum	April 9, 2000	06-99-111	15.19
12	12	"Cheerleader"	Todd Holland	Dan Kopelman	April 16, 2000	06-99-112	12.91
13	13	"Rollerskates"	Ken Kwapis	Alan J. Higgins	April 30, 2000	06-99-108	14.24
14	14	"The Bots and the Bees"	Chris Koch	Alan J. Higgins & David Richardson	May 7, 2000	06-00-202	12.42
15	15	"Smunday"	Jeff Melman	Michael Glouberman & Andrew Orenstein	May 14, 2000	06-00-201	12.56
16	16	"Waterpark"	Ken Kwapis	Maggie Bandur & Pang-Ni Landrum	May 21, 2000	06-00-203	14.39

=== Season 2 (2000–2001) ===
Season 2 episodes
No. overall	No. in season	Title	Directed by	Written by	Original release date	Prod. code	U.S. viewers (millions)
17	1	"Traffic Jam"	Todd Holland	Dan Kopelman	November 5, 2000	06-00-204	15.52
18	2	"Halloween Approximately"	Todd Holland	Dan Kopelman	November 8, 2000	06-00-207	9.18
19	3	"Lois' Birthday"	Ken Kwapis	Alex Reid	November 12, 2000	06-00-205	16.43
20	4	"Dinner Out"	Jeff Melman	Michael Glouberman & Andrew Orenstein	November 15, 2000	06-00-206	9.73
21	5	"Casino"	Todd Holland	Gary Murphy & Neil Thompson	November 19, 2000	06-00-209	14.21
22	6	"Convention"	Jeff Melman	Bob Stevens	November 22, 2000	06-00-208	9.87
23	7	"Robbery"	Todd Holland	Alan J. Higgins	November 26, 2000	06-00-215	15.52
24	8	"Therapy"	Ken Kwapis	Ian Busch	November 29, 2000	06-00-210	9.53
25	9	"High School Play"	Jeff Melman	Maggie Bandur & Pang-Ni Landrum	December 10, 2000	06-00-211	16.92
26	10	"The Bully"	Jeff Melman	Alex Reid	December 17, 2000	06-00-214	15.87
27	11	"Old Mrs. Old"	Todd Holland	Alan J. Higgins	January 7, 2001	06-00-213	17.10
28	12	"Krelboyne Girl"	Arlene Sanford	Bob Stevens	January 14, 2001	06-00-212	14.86
29	13	"New Neighbors"	Ken Kwapis	Maggie Bandur & Pang-Ni Landrum	January 21, 2001	06-00-219	14.89
30	14	"Hal Quits"	Ken Kwapis	Michael Glouberman & Andrew Orenstein	February 4, 2001	06-00-216	18.59
31	15	"The Grandparents"	Todd Holland	Gary Murphy & Neil Thompson	February 11, 2001	06-00-217	14.33
32	16	"Traffic Ticket"	Jeff Melman	Larry Strawther	February 18, 2001	06-00-218	15.80
33	17	"Surgery"	Jeff Melman	Maggie Bandur & Pang-Ni Landrum	February 25, 2001	06-00-222	17.55
34	18	"Reese Cooks"	Jeff Melman	Dan Kopelman	March 4, 2001	06-00-220	17.03
35	19	"Tutoring Reese"	Ken Kwapis	Ian Busch	March 11, 2001	06-00-221	14.90
36	20	"Bowling"	Todd Holland	Alex Reid	April 1, 2001	06-00-223	13.71
37	21	"Malcolm vs. Reese"	Todd Holland	Story by : Dan Danko & Tom Mason; Teleplay by : Dan Kopelman	April 22, 2001	06-00-226	14.46
38	22	"Mini-Bike"	Ken Kwapis	Michael Glouberman & Andrew Orenstein	April 29, 2001	06-00-227	14.59
39	23	"Carnival"	Ken Kwapis	Alex Reid	May 6, 2001	06-00-225	13.61
40	24	"Evacuation"	Todd Holland	Gary Murphy & Neil Thompson	May 13, 2001	06-00-228	14.02
41	25	"Flashback"	Jeff Melman	Ian Busch	May 20, 2001	06-00-224	13.77

=== Season 3 (2001–2002) ===
Season 3 episodes
No. overall	No. in season	Title	Directed by	Written by	Original release date	Prod. code	U.S. viewers (millions)
42	1	"Houseboat"	Todd Holland	Bob Stevens	November 11, 2001	06-01-301	15.49
43	2	"Emancipation"	Jimmy Simons	Alan J. Higgins	November 14, 2001	06-01-302	8.94
44	3	"Book Club"	Todd Holland	Alex Reid	November 18, 2001	06-01-304	13.62
45	4	"Malcolm's Girlfriend"	Ken Kwapis	Ian Busch	November 28, 2001	06-01-305	8.91
46	5	"Charity"	Jeff Melman	Gary Murphy & Neil Thompson	December 2, 2001	06-01-303	12.03
47	6	"Health Scare"	Todd Holland	Dan Kopelman	December 9, 2001	06-01-307	12.89
48	7	"Christmas"	Jeff Melman	Maggie Bandur & Pang-Ni Landrum	December 16, 2001	06-01-306	13.07
49	8	"Poker"	Ken Kwapis	Michael Borkow	January 6, 2002	06-01-308	11.84
50	9	"Reese's Job"	Todd Holland	Gary Murphy & Neil Thompson	January 20, 2002	06-01-310	11.14
51	10	"Lois' Makeover"	Jeff Melman	Michael Glouberman & Andrew Orenstein	January 27, 2002	06-01-311	13.48
52 53	11 12	"Company Picnic"	Todd Holland	Story by : Janae Bakken; Teleplay by : Alan J. Higgins	February 3, 2002	06-01-313 06-01-314	21.45
54	13	"Reese Drives"	Jeff Melman	Michael Glouberman & Andrew Orenstein	February 10, 2002	06-01-309	13.27
55	14	"Cynthia's Back"	Ken Kwapis	Maggie Bandur & Pang-Ni Landrum	February 17, 2002	06-01-312	11.93
56	15	"Hal's Birthday"	Levie Isaacks	Alex Reid	March 3, 2002	06-01-316	13.58
57	16	"Hal Coaches"	Jeff Melman	Ian Busch	March 10, 2002	06-01-319	14.32
58	17	"Dewey's Dog"	Bob Stevens	Michael Glouberman & Andrew Orenstein	April 7, 2002	06-01-318	12.39
59	18	"Poker #2"	Jeff Melman	Story by : John Bradford Goodman; Teleplay by : Bill Hooper	April 21, 2002	06-01-322	11.93
60	19	"Clip Show"	Jamie Babbit	Michael Borkow & Alex Reid	April 28, 2002	06-01-321	13.12
61	20	"Jury Duty"	Ken Kwapis	Story by : Pang-Ni Landrum & Tom Mason & Dan Danko; Teleplay by : Pang-Ni Landrum	May 1, 2002	06-01-320	5.89
62	21	"Cliques"	Jeff Melman	Michael Borkow	May 5, 2002	06-01-317	10.95
63	22	"Monkey"	Ken Kwapis	Dan Kopelman	May 12, 2002	06-01-315	11.94

=== Season 4 (2002–2003) ===
Season 4 episodes
No. overall	No. in season	Title	Directed by	Written by	Original release date	Prod. code	U.S. viewers (millions)
64	1	"Zoo"	Todd Holland	Michael Glouberman & Andrew Orenstein	November 3, 2002	06-02-401	12.21
65	2	"Humilithon"	Jeff Melman	Michael Borkow	November 10, 2002	06-02-402	9.64
66	3	"Family Reunion"	Ken Kwapis	Alex Reid	November 17, 2002	06-02-403	10.92
67	4	"Stupid Girl"	Todd Holland	Dan Kopelman	November 24, 2002	06-02-404	9.82
68	5	"Forwards Backwards"	Levie Isaacks	Maggie Bandur	December 1, 2002	06-02-406	10.71
69	6	"Forbidden Girlfriend"	Jamie Babbit	Matthew Carlson	December 15, 2002	06-02-405	11.19
70	7	"Malcolm Holds His Tongue"	Jeff Melman	Gary Murphy & Neil Thompson	January 5, 2003	06-02-410	10.45
71	8	"Boys at Ranch"	David D'Ovidio	Gary Murphy & Neil Thompson	January 12, 2003	06-02-412	10.36
72	9	"Grandma Sues"	Jimmy Simons	Michael Glouberman & Andrew Orenstein	February 2, 2003	06-02-407	13.72
73	10	"If Boys Were Girls"	Ken Kwapis	Story by : Alexandra Kaczenski; Teleplay by : Nahnatchka Khan	February 9, 2003	06-02-408	11.70
74	11	"Long Drive"	Levie Isaacks	Michael Borkow	March 2, 2003	06-02-409	11.52
75	12	"Kicked Out"	Jeff Melman	Alex Reid	March 9, 2003	06-02-413	11.73
76	13	"Stereo Store"	Bryan Cranston	Matthew Carlson	March 16, 2003	06-02-414	10.96
77	14	"Hal's Friend"	Jeff Melman	Dan Kopelman	March 30, 2003	06-02-415	11.10
78	15	"Garage Sale"	Levie Isaacks	Maggie Bandur	April 6, 2003	06-02-416	10.18
79	16	"Academic Octathalon"	Todd Holland	Rob Hanning	April 13, 2003	06-02-411	9.25
80	17	"Clip Show 2"	Levie Isaacks	Maggie Bandur and Dan Kopelman	April 20, 2003	06-02-422	8.69
81	18	"Reese's Party"	Levie Isaacks	Andy Bobrow	April 27, 2003	06-02-418	11.07
82	19	"Future Malcolm"	Ken Kwapis	Story by : Ron Corcillo & A.J. Poulin; Teleplay by : Michael Glouberman & Andrew Orenstein	May 4, 2003	06-02-417	12.11
83	20	"Baby (Part 1)"	Jimmy Simons	Rob Hanning	May 11, 2003	06-02-419	9.82
84	21	"Baby (Part 2)"	Jamie Babbit	Michael Borkow	May 18, 2003	06-02-420	10.83
85	22	"Day Care"	Steve Love	Gary Murphy & Neil Thompson	May 18, 2003	06-02-421	10.48

=== Season 5 (2003–2004) ===
Season 5 episodes
No. overall	No. in season	Title	Directed by	Written by	Original release date	Prod. code	U.S. viewers (millions)
86	1	"Vegas"	Bryan Cranston	Michael Glouberman & Andrew Orenstein	November 2, 2003	06-03-501	10.26
87	2	"Watching the Baby"	Levie Isaacks	Alex Reid	November 9, 2003	06-03-502	9.63
88	3	"Goodbye Kitty"	Jimmy Simons	Gary Murphy & Neil Thompson	November 16, 2003	06-03-503	9.16
89	4	"Thanksgiving"	David D'Ovidio	Matthew Carlson	November 23, 2003	06-03-504	10.21
90	5	"Malcolm Films Reese"	Levie Isaacks	Dan Kopelman	November 30, 2003	06-03-505	9.18
91	6	"Malcolm's Job"	Steve Welch	Maggie Bandur	December 7, 2003	06-03-506	8.37
92	7	"Christmas Trees"	Steve Love	Alex Reid	December 14, 2003	06-03-507	8.71
93	8	"Block Party"	Levie Isaacks	Rob Ulin	January 4, 2004	06-03-508	7.45
94	9	"Dirty Magazine"	Bryan Cranston	Eric Kaplan	January 11, 2004	06-03-509	9.07
95	10	"Hot Tub"	Jimmy Simons	Andy Bobrow	January 25, 2004	06-03-510	8.70
96	11	"Ida's Boyfriend"	Peter Lauer	Neil Thompson	February 8, 2004	06-03-512	6.39
97	12	"Softball"	Ken Kwapis	Michael Glouberman	February 15, 2004	06-03-511	7.61
98	13	"Lois' Sister"	David D'Ovidio	Gary Murphy	February 22, 2004	06-03-513	10.29
99	14	"Malcolm Dates a Family"	Steve Welch	Rob Ulin	March 14, 2004	06-03-514	7.61
100	15	"Reese's Apartment"	David Grossman	Dan Kopelman	March 21, 2004	06-03-515	9.30
101	16	"Malcolm Visits College"	Peter Lauer	David Wright	March 28, 2004	06-03-517	9.06
102	17	"Polly in the Middle"	Steve Love	Matthew Carlson	April 25, 2004	06-03-516	7.21
103	18	"Dewey's Special Class"	David D'Ovidio	Maggie Bandur	May 2, 2004	06-03-519	7.45
104	19	"Experiment"	Bryan Cranston	Alex Reid	May 2, 2004	06-03-518	6.92
105	20	"Victor's Other Family"	David Grossman	Eric Kaplan	May 9, 2004	06-03-520	5.58
106	21	"Reese Joins the Army (Part 1)"	Steve Love	Andy Bobrow	May 16, 2004	06-03-521	7.50
107	22	"Reese Joins the Army (Part 2)"	Peter Lauer	Andrew Orenstein	May 23, 2004	06-03-522	7.99

=== Season 6 (2004–2005) ===
Season 6 episodes
No. overall	No. in season	Title	Directed by	Written by	Original release date	Prod. code	U.S. viewers (millions)
108	1	"Reese Comes Home"	Todd Holland	Matthew Carlson	November 7, 2004	06-04-602	7.11
109	2	"Buseys Run Away"	Bryan Cranston	Michael Glouberman	November 14, 2004	06-04-601	9.06
110	3	"Standee"	David D'Ovidio	Rob Ulin	November 21, 2004	06-04-603	7.06
111	4	"Pearl Harbor"	Peter Lauer	Neil Thompson	December 5, 2004	06-04-606	7.78
112	5	"Kitty's Back"	Peter Lauer	Matthew Carlson	December 12, 2004	06-04-604	9.50
113	6	"Hal's Christmas Gift"	David Grossman	Alex Reid	December 19, 2004	06-04-605	4.67
114	7	"Hal Sleepwalks"	David D'Ovidio	Gary Murphy	January 16, 2005	06-04-607	5.35
115	8	"Lois Battles Jamie"	Steve Welch	Michael Glouberman	January 23, 2005	06-04-608	5.24
116	9	"Malcolm's Car"	Peter Lauer	Alex Reid	January 30, 2005	06-04-610	5.93
117	10	"Billboard"	Bryan Cranston	Rob Ulin	February 13, 2005	06-04-609	5.43
118	11	"Dewey's Opera"	Linwood Boomer	Eric Kaplan	February 20, 2005	06-04-611	6.49
119	12	"Living Will"	Steve Love	Jennifer Celotta	March 6, 2005	06-04-612	5.32
120	13	"Tiki Lounge"	Peter Lauer	Jay Kogen	March 13, 2005	06-04-613	5.58
121	14	"Ida Loses a Leg"	Steve Welch	Andy Bobrow	March 20, 2005	06-04-614	5.23
122	15	"Chad's Sleepover"	David D'Ovidio	Rob Ulin	March 27, 2005	06-04-615	4.13
123	16	"No Motorcycles"	Jimmy Simons	Andy Bobrow	April 3, 2005	06-04-618	4.15
124	17	"Butterflies"	David Grossman	Michael Glouberman	April 10, 2005	06-04-616	4.91
125	18	"Ida's Dance"	Steve Welch	Eric Kaplan	April 17, 2005	06-04-619	4.43
126	19	"Motivational Speaker"	Steve Love	Rob Ulin	April 24, 2005	06-04-620	5.77
127	20	"Stilts"	Linwood Boomer	Michael Glouberman	May 1, 2005	06-04-622	6.84
128	21	"Buseys Take a Hostage"	David D'Ovidio	Gary Murphy	May 8, 2005	06-04-621	4.89
129	22	"Mrs. Tri-County"	David D'Ovidio	Gary Murphy	May 15, 2005	06-04-617	5.16

=== Season 7 (2005–2006) ===
Season 7 episodes
No. overall	No. in season	Title	Directed by	Written by	Original release date	Prod. code	U.S. viewers (millions)
130	1	"Burning Man"	Peter Lauer	Michael Glouberman	September 30, 2005	06-05-701	3.50
131	2	"Health Insurance"	Steve Welch	Rob Ulin	October 7, 2005	06-05-702	3.44
132	3	"Reese vs. Stevie"	Linwood Boomer	Alex Reid	October 21, 2005	06-05-703	3.63
133	4	"Halloween"	David D'Ovidio	Andy Bobrow	October 28, 2005	06-05-704	3.53
134	5	"Jessica Stays Over"	Alex Reid	Matthew Carlson	November 4, 2005	06-05-705	3.53
135	6	"Secret Boyfriend"	Peter Lauer	Gary Murphy	November 11, 2005	06-05-706	3.65
136	7	"Blackout"	Steve Welch	Eric Kaplan	November 18, 2005	06-05-707	3.18
137	8	"Army Buddy"	Peter Lauer	Neil Thompson	December 2, 2005	06-05-708	3.14
138	9	"Malcolm Defends Reese"	Bryan Cranston	Matthew Carlson	December 16, 2005	06-05-709	3.17
139	10	"Malcolm's Money"	Steve Love	Michael Glouberman	January 6, 2006	06-05-710	3.56
140	11	"Bride of Ida"	Linwood Boomer	Rob Ulin	January 13, 2006	06-05-711	3.80
141	12	"College Recruiters"	Peter Lauer	Jay Kogen	January 29, 2006	06-05-712	4.37
142	13	"Mono"	David D'Ovidio	Andy Bobrow	February 12, 2006	06-05-713	3.86
143	14	"Hal Grieves"	Christopher Kennedy Masterson	Eric Kaplan	February 19, 2006	06-05-714	3.95
144	15	"A.A."	Steve Welch	Al Higgins	March 5, 2006	06-05-715	4.12
145	16	"Lois Strikes Back"	Alex Reid	Gary Murphy	March 19, 2006	06-05-716	4.94
146	17	"Hal's Dentist"	Steve Love	Jay Kogen	March 26, 2006	06-05-717	3.58
147	18	"Bomb Shelter"	Matthew Carlson	Rob Ulin	April 2, 2006	06-05-719	3.74
148	19	"Stevie in the Hospital"	Steve Welch	Dave Ihlenfeld & David Wright	April 9, 2006	06-05-720	3.60
149	20	"Cattle Court"	Peter Lauer	Michael Glouberman	April 16, 2006	06-05-718	2.89
150	21	"Morp"	David D'Ovidio	Gary Murphy	April 23, 2006	06-05-721	3.02
151	22	"Graduation"	Linwood Boomer	Michael Glouberman	May 14, 2006	06-05-722	7.38

== Ratings ==
=== Season 1–3 ===
Malcolm in the Middle : U.S. viewers per episode (millions)

Season	Episode number																								
Season	1	2	3	4	5	6	7	8	9	10	11	12	13	14	15	16	17	18	19	20	21	22	23	24	25
1	22.35	23.24	19.29	16.93	18.05	15.90	16.06	14.19	16.29	13.12	15.19	12.91	14.24	12.42	12.56	14.39	–								
2	15.52	9.18	16.43	9.73	14.21	9.87	15.52	9.53	16.92	15.87	17.10	14.86	14.89	18.59	14.33	15.80	17.55	17.03	14.90	13.71	14.46	14.59	13.61	14.02	13.77
3	15.49	8.94	13.62	8.91	12.03	12.89	13.07	11.84	11.14	13.48	21.45	21.45	13.27	11.93	13.58	14.32	12.39	11.93	13.12	5.89	10.95	11.94	–		

Audience measurement performed by Nielsen Media Research (Note: For the first season see, Episode one: Episode two: Episode three: Episode four: Episode five: Episode six: Episode seven: Episode eight: Episode nine: Episode ten: Episode eleven: Episode twelve: Episode thirteen: Episode fourteen: Episode fifteen: Episode sixteen:) (Note: For the second season see, Episode one: Episode two: Episode three: Episode four: Episode five: Episode six: Episode seven: Episode eight: Episode nine: Episode ten: Episode eleven: Episode twelve: Episode thirteen: Episode fourteen: Episode fifteen: Episode sixteen: Episode seventeen: Episode eighteen: Episode nineteen: Episode twenty: Episode twenty-one: Episode twenty-two: Episode twenty-three: Episode twenty-four: Episode twenty-five:) (Note: For the third season see, Episode one: Episode two: Episode three: Episode four: Episode five: Episode six: Episode seven: Episode eight: Episode nine: Episode ten: Episode eleven: Episode twelve: Episode thirteen: Episode fourteen: Episode fifteen: Episode sixteen: Episode seventeen: Episode eighteen: Episode nineteen: Episode twenty: Episode twenty-one: Episode twenty-two:)

=== Season 4–5 ===
Malcolm in the Middle : U.S. viewers per episode (millions)

Season	Episode number																					
Season	1	2	3	4	5	6	7	8	9	10	11	12	13	14	15	16	17	18	19	20	21	22
4	12.21	9.64	10.92	9.82	10.71	11.19	10.45	10.36	13.72	11.70	11.52	11.73	10.96	11.10	10.18	9.25	8.69	11.07	12.11	9.82	10.83	10.48
5	10.26	9.63	9.16	10.21	9.18	8.37	8.71	7.45	9.07	8.70	6.39	7.61	10.29	7.61	9.30	9.06	7.21	7.45	6.92	5.58	7.50	7.99

Audience measurement performed by Nielsen Media Research (Note: For the fourth season see, Episode one: Episode two: Episode three: Episode four: Episode five: Episode six: Episode seven: Episode eight: Episode nine: Episode ten: Episode eleven: Episode twelve: Episode thirteen: Episode fourteen: Episode fifteen: Episode sixteen: Episode seventeen: Episode eighteen: Episode nineteen: Episode twenty: Episode twenty-one: Episode twenty-two:) (Note: For the fifth season see, Episode one: Episode two: Episode three: Episode four: Episode five: Episode six: Episode seven: Episode eight: Episode nine: Episode ten: Episode eleven: Episode twelve: Episode thirteen: Episode fourteen: Episode fifteen: Episode sixteen: Episode seventeen: Episode eighteen: Episode nineteen: Episode twenty: Episode twenty-one: Episode twenty-two:)

=== Season 6–7 ===
Malcolm in the Middle : U.S. viewers per episode (millions)

Season	Episode number																					
Season	1	2	3	4	5	6	7	8	9	10	11	12	13	14	15	16	17	18	19	20	21	22
6	7.11	9.06	7.06	7.78	9.50	4.67	5.35	5.24	5.93	5.43	6.49	5.32	5.58	5.23	4.13	4.15	4.91	4.43	5.77	6.84	4.89	5.16
7	3.50	3.44	3.63	3.53	3.53	3.65	3.18	3.14	3.17	3.56	3.80	4.37	3.86	3.95	4.12	4.94	3.58	3.74	3.60	2.89	3.02	7.38

Audience measurement performed by Nielsen Media Research (Note: For the sixth season see, Episode one: Episode two: Episode three: Episode four: Episode five: Episode six: Episode seven: Episode eight: Episode nine: Episode ten: Episode eleven: Episode twelve: Episode thirteen: Episode fourteen: Episode fifteen: Episode sixteen: Episode seventeen: Episode eighteen: Episode nineteen: Episode twenty: Episode twenty-one: Episode twenty-two:) (Note: For the seventh season see, Episode one: Episode two: Episode three: Episode four: Episode five: Episode six: Episode seven: Episode eight: Episode nine: Episode ten: Episode eleven: Episode twelve: Episode thirteen: Episode fourteen: Episode fifteen: Episode sixteen: Episode seventeen: Episode eighteen: Episode nineteen: Episode twenty: Episode twenty-one: Episode twenty-two:)
