= Pilot (Malcolm in the Middle) =

- Malcolm in the Middle episode
- Malcolm (right) sits next to Stevie (left) after joining the Krelboyne class.
- Episode no.: Season 1 Episode 1
- Directed by: Todd Holland
- Written by: Linwood Boomer
- Production code: 10012-99-179
- Original air date: January 9, 2000
- Running time: 22 minutes

Episode chronology
← Previous —	Next → "Red Dress"
- Malcolm in the Middle season 1

"Pilot" is the series premiere and the first episode of the first season of the American television sitcom Malcolm in the Middle. Written by Linwood Boomer and directed by Todd Holland, it originally premiered on the Fox Network on January 9, 2000. It introduces the six primary characters, which consist of series protagonist Malcolm (Frankie Muniz), his mother Lois (Jane Kaczmarek), father Hal (Bryan Cranston), older brothers Reese (Justin Berfield) and Francis (Christopher Kennedy Masterson), and younger brother Dewey (Erik Per Sullivan). The episode focuses on Malcolm's friendship with fellow student Stevie Kenarban (Craig Lamar Traylor) and his struggles and fears to be placed in the accelerated learning class, the Krelboynes, even though he has an IQ of 165.

Malcolm in the Middle was created by Boomer originally intended for the 1998-99 television season on UPN. However, they passed on the series, and then-president of the Fox Network's entertainment division Doug Herzog greenlit the series upon hearing about it. During its original broadcast, "Pilot" was watched by 22.35 million viewers and has since received positive reviews from critics, who have often hailed it as one of the best episodes of the series, and one of the greatest television pilots ever made. Boomer and Holland received Emmy Awards for their work on the episode, along with episode editor Nancy Morrison, who won the Best Edited Half-Hour Series award for her contributions to the episode.

== Plot ==
Brothers Malcolm, Reese, and Dewey wake up to a typical school morning - the three brothers fighting over breakfast, while their mother Lois carelessly shaves their father Hal's excessive body hair. While walking to school, Malcolm and Dewey lay eyes upon the school bully, Dave Spath. In class, Malcolm's teacher comments on his talent for painting; in an act of jealousy, Spath pours red paint on his chair. Malcolm sits in the paint just before being called to see the school psychologist, Caroline Miller, and is ridiculed by everyone he passes on the way to her office. Caroline states her intentions to run some tests on Malcolm and does so by holding up a tampered picture with several mistakes in it. Still annoyed at Spath's prank, Malcolm launches into a tirade, angrily yet correctly naming all the mistakes before yelling about the paint on his clothes. In an excited manner, Caroline stops her watch that she was using to time him.

After school, Malcolm arrives for a "play-date" with fellow student Stevie Kenarban. Realizing that Stevie's mother is very protective, Malcolm concludes there is nothing to do until Stevie reveals he has a closet full of comics. The discovery instantly sparks a friendship. The next day, a topless Lois is met by Caroline, who wishes to speak to her. After misconstruing that she wants to put Malcolm in a special class for intellectually disabled children, Lois is informed of Malcolm's academic capabilities. At dinner, Lois persuades Malcolm to join the accelerated learning class dubbed "the Krelboynes", stating that it is important for him to join, as he will no doubt have a better future as a result.

The next day, Malcolm's teacher informs his non-interested class about how he is a success, and Malcolm finds himself surrounded by geniuses only a short while later. After accidentally insulting Stevie, Malcolm tries to make amends with him but Spath once again picks on Malcolm. This causes Malcolm to lose his temper and begins to insult Spath, telling him he's worthless. As the two start a fight, Malcolm ducks as Spath's fist accidentally brushes against the cheek of Stevie's face. Stevie overhears Spath's friends talking and then falls over in his wheelchair, turning the crowd against Spath despite his claim that it was an accident. As Malcolm and Stevie smile at one another, Malcolm realizes there are things worse than being a Krelboyne.

== Production ==
Malcolm in the Middle was created by Linwood Boomer, and was originally pitched to UPN for the 1998-99 television season. However, the network lost interest in it, as they felt it did not fit their target demographic. When Fox's then-president of entertainment Doug Herzog heard about the project, he decided to greenlit it, and waited until mid-season to air it. Boomer had based the series on his own childhood experiences, something that caught Herzog's attention. Herzog committed the series to a thirteen episode season, with the possibility of further installments.

=== Casting ===
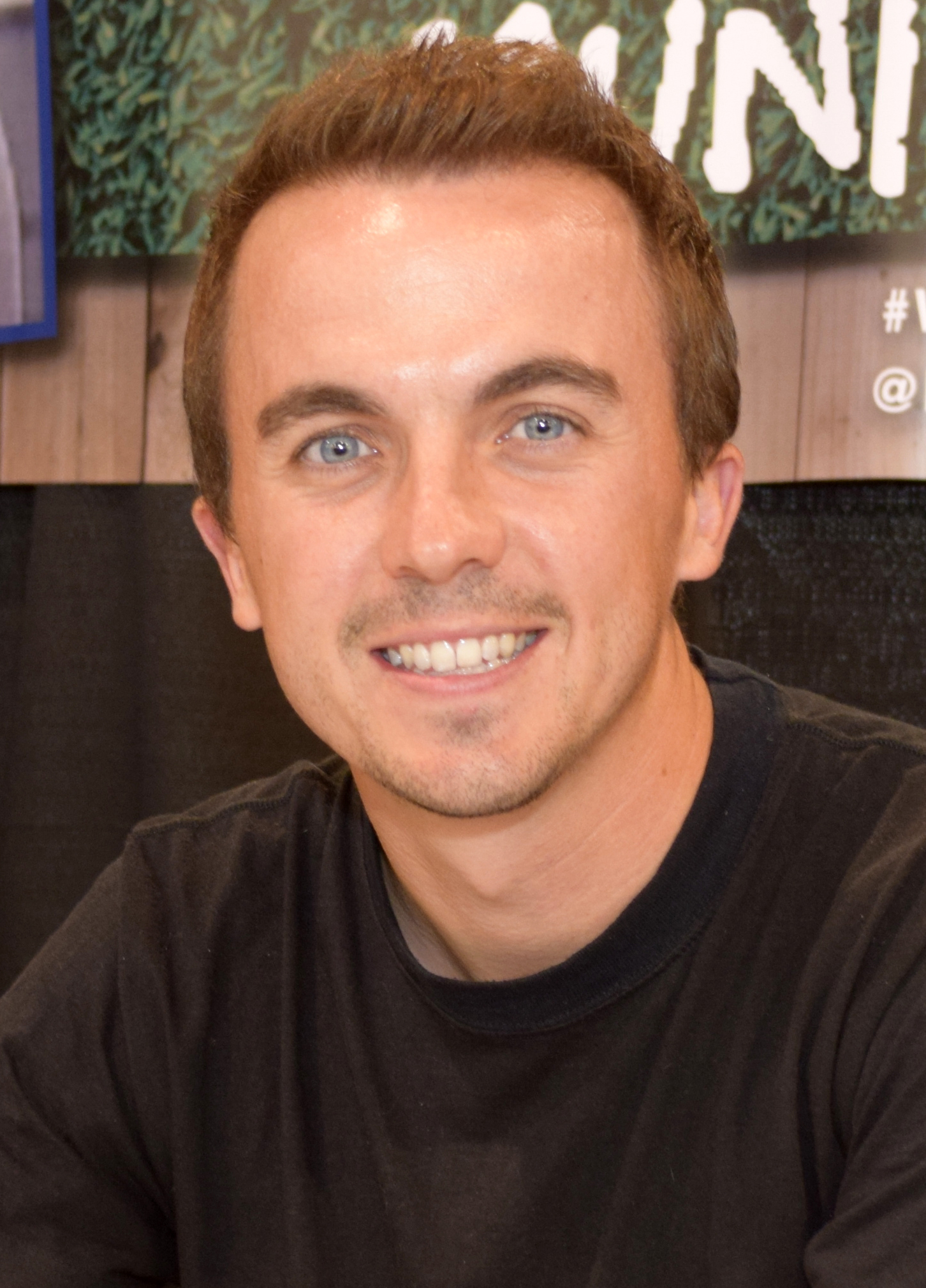
Frankie Muniz portrayed Malcolm, who is the main protagonist of the series.

Frankie Muniz had a Pizza Hut commercial audition 30 minutes after his Malcolm in the Middle one. Muniz was worried he would miss the Pizza Hut audition, and pleaded to his mother to let him skip his Malcolm in the Middle audition, but he ended up going anyway. Muniz thought he was "too old" for the role, and thought they would pass on him. However, the producers were impressed with his performance, and he was ultimately cast.

Aaron Paul was interested in auditioning for the role of Francis, but the producers were not interested in casting him, and "kept passing". The role instead went to Christopher Kennedy Masterson, who had only auditioned once, and got the job soon after. Jane Kaczmarek got pregnant around the time of the pilot season, and asked her agents not to send her any auditions. Series casting director Mary Fox persuaded her agents to send her the script for the Malcolm in the Middle pilot. Kaczmarek initially did not want to portray Lois, but enjoyed how "quirky and endearing" Lois was, and eventually accepted the role.

Justin Berfield and Erik Per Sullivan were cast as Reese and Dewey respectively, with Catherine Lloyd Burns additionally being cast as Malcolm's teacher. Hal's character was initially underwritten, described by Boomer as "a writer's conceit that just lay there on the page like a turd". However, during Bryan Cranston's audition for the part, he had to listen to a fight between a mother character and her children. Cranston put a pipe in his mouth, making Boomer fall from his chair in laughter. Boomer described Cranston as a man who "looks like he's listening, but he's actually building a rocket ship in his head", and passed Cranston.

=== Filming ===
"Pilot" was directed by Todd Holland, and written by Boomer, with the latter receiving final writing credits on September 21, 1999. Filming primarily took place at Stage 21 at CBS Studio Center in Studio City, and was used for the interior of the home and the backyard. In the first scene of the episode, Cranston did not have a hairy back, so yak hair was used, along with a body double. Unlike most sitcoms at the time, Malcolm in the Middle was filmed in a single-camera style. The single-camera style that was used would go on to influence later shows in the decision to work with them.

== Release and reception ==
"Pilot" first premiered on the Fox Network at 8:30 p.m. Eastern Standard Time in the United States on January 9, 2000, with the episode serving as the highest rated premiere for the network since The Simpsons debut episode, "Simpsons Roasting on an Open Fire", in 1989. Upon its release, ratings for the season were high, with the episode receiving 22.35 million viewers. The next episode, "Red Dress", marked an increase of almost one million viewers from "Pilot", airing on January 16, and being watched by 23.24 million people. "Pilot" was first released onto home video in the United States on October 29, 2002, in the Complete First Season DVD box set, which also included an extended version of the episode.

Since release, "Pilot" has received positive reviews, Ramin Zahed of Variety praised the episode for the way it was shot. Additionally, both Amanda Bruce and Stephen Barker of ScreenRant placed ranked "Pilot" as the fifteenth best episode of the series, writing that "the episode effectively establishes the family dynamics and Malcolm's struggle with his intellectual gifts and social challenges." In a review for DVD Talk, Aaron Beierle cited the episode as one of the highlights amongst the season. In an interview for The Independent in 2020, Kaczmarek reflected on "Pilot" fondly, stating "[It] was so funny and so good, I was sure it’d never get made." Daniel Kurland, writing for Comic Book Resources, placed the episode at number eight out of ten in a list of the Best Sitcom Pilots of All Time, considering "Pilot" as a sublime first taste of this sitcom's universe." Additionally, "Pilot" is one of the highest rated episodes of Malcolm in the Middle on IMDb, with an average rating of 8.2 out of 10 amongst viewers.

=== Accolades ===
The episode won multiple awards, including two Primetime Emmy Awards for Outstanding Directing and Writing for a Comedy Series for Holland and Boomer in 2000 respectively. Leading on from this, Holland was nominated for the Directors Guild of America Award for Outstanding Directing – Comedy Series in 2001. Editor Nancy Morrison was nominated for, and won the Best Edited Half-Hour Series award for her work on "Pilot" in 2001.
