= Malcolm in the Middle season 1 =

2000 American sitcom

Malcolm in the Middle
- Season 1
- Official season poster
- Showrunner: Linwood Boomer
- Starring: Jane Kaczmarek; Bryan Cranston; Christopher Masterson; Justin Berfield; Erik Per Sullivan; Catherine Lloyd Burns; Frankie Muniz
- No. of episodes: 16

Release
- Original network: Fox
- Original release: January 9 – May 21, 2000

Season chronology
- Next → Season 2

The first season of the American television sitcom Malcolm in the Middle premiered on January 9, 2000, and concluded on May 21, 2000. The sixteen-episode season was broadcast in the United States on the Fox Network. The series follows child prodigy Malcolm (Frankie Muniz) and his dysfunctional family, including his mother Lois (Jane Kaczmarek), father Hal (Bryan Cranston), older brothers Francis (Christopher Masterson) and Reese (Justin Berfield), and younger brother Dewey (Erik Per Sullivan). A child prodigy, Malcolm attends a class dubbed the "Krelboyne class", taught by Caroline Miller (Catherine Lloyd Burns).

Malcolm in the Middle was created by Linwood Boomer, and was originally intended for the 1998–99 television season on UPN. When they ultimately passed on the series, then-president of the Fox Network's entertainment division Doug Herzog, upon hearing about it, quickly greenlit the series for a full season. Herzog was interested in the series as it reminded him of his own family, particularly his young children, with the dynamic of the family coming from Boomer's own childhood experiences. Like with the rest of the series, Cranston performed his own stunts for the season, including wearing a suit of live bees for a whole scene; he only got stung once.

The series was a rating success, particularly for its mid-season timeslot and for airing directly following The Simpsons. The season had high viewership among multiple demographics, such as teenagers, children, and general viewers aged 18-49, particularly men. It was also acclaimed by critics, who praised its subversion of tropes, unique style, and the cast's performances, notably Muniz's. The season would go on to receive several different award nominations.

== Cast and characters ==
=== Main ===
- Jane Kaczmarek as Lois
- Bryan Cranston as Hal
- Christopher Kennedy Masterson as Francis
- Justin Berfield as Reese
- Erik Per Sullivan as Dewey
- Catherine Lloyd Burns as Caroline Miller
- Frankie Muniz as Malcolm

=== Recurring ===
- Craig Lamar Traylor as Stevie Kenarban
- David Anthony Higgins as Craig Feldspar
- Daniel von Bargen as Commandant Edwin Spangler
- Karim Prince as Cadet Stanley
- Drew Powell as Cadet Drew
- Merrin Dungey as Kitty Kenarban
- Landry Allbright as Julie

=== Guest stars ===
- Aloma Wright as Nurse ("Home Alone 4")
- Tom Virtue as Priest ("Home Alone 4")
- Justin Pierce as Justin ("Home Alone 4" & "Smunday")
- Eric Stonestreet as Phil ("Malcolm Babysits")
- Beth Grant as Dorene Hooper ("Krelboyne Picnic")
- Joel McKinnon Miller as Officer Karl ("Stock Car Races")
- Alexander Gould as Egg ("Funeral")
- Bea Arthur as Mrs. White ("Water Park")
- Amanda Fuller as April ("Water Park")

== Episodes ==
Season 1 episodes
No. overall	No. in season	Title	Directed by	Written by	Original release date	Prod. code	U.S. viewers (millions)
1	1	"Pilot"	Todd Holland	Linwood Boomer	January 9, 2000	10012-99-179	22.35
Child prodigy Malcolm lives with his dysfunctional family: neurotic father Hal, controlling mother Lois, bully brother Reese, and odd younger brother Dewey. His eldest brother, Francis, resides at a military school in Alabama, Marlin Academy, for his misbehavior. At school, Malcolm tries to keep a low profile and avoid his bully, Spath, but his teachers spot his intelligence, and further testing reveals his I.Q. to be 165. Lois forces him to join the school's gifted class, but Malcolm objects because he doesn't want to be a "Krelboyne", a term for the gifted, socially awkward kids at his school. Frustrated due to being ostracized by the other kids, Malcolm lashes out at Spath, and, with help from his new handicapped friend Stevie (Craig Lamar Traylor), fortuitously humiliates Spath by making it seem like he pushed a wheelchair-bound Stevie to the floor.
2	2	"Red Dress"	Arlene Sanford	Alan J. Higgins	January 16, 2000	06-99-103	23.24
Lois makes plan with Hal to meet at an expensive restaurant for their anniversary, but forgets to go after she finds the red dress she intended to wear burned and flushed down the toilet. She spends the night punishing the boys, trying to figure out which of them did it. Meanwhile, Hal makes friends with a member of the restaurant staff while waiting for Lois. Malcolm, seeing that he and his brothers cannot fight Lois alone, calls Francis for help against Lois, but this leads to further trouble for them when she finds out. Despite the tension, Lois decides to take the kids out to dinner, and Hal, coming home to an empty house, accidentally burns and flushes Lois' other dress, revealing he was the culprit.
3	3	"Home Alone 4"	Todd Holland	Michael Glouberman & Andrew Orenstein	January 23, 2000	06-99-106	19.29
While Hal and Lois are away for the weekend, Francis comes home from military school to babysit. Malcolm overhears a discussion between Lois and Hal's about Francis out of context, and believes he will be allowed to return home permanently if he watches over them well enough, so Malcolm convinces the other boys to be on their best behavior. A series of reckless behavior nevertheless occurs, but the boys manage to fix and hide all of them in time. Seeing the good work Francis has done, Hal and Lois send him back for military school, on account of how much they think his behavior has improved since going there.
4	4	"Shame"	Nick Marck	David Richardson	February 6, 2000	06-99-107	16.93
Fed up with his bully, Kevin, Malcolm beats him up, but it turns out that Kevin is only a 7-year-old, something Malcolm learns after he beat him up. Malcolm feels guilty and tries to clear his conscience, but ultimately fails, especially after Hal accidentally beats up Kevin's 15-year-old brother. Concurrently, Dewey is injured while climbing a tree, so Hal cuts it down, but they soon miss the tree, and so Hal plants another. Francis decides to steal the slides for the military academy's vulgar sex education slideshow, but he finds some embarrassing slides of Commandant Spangler (Daniel Von Bargen) in his office, which he replaces with the original slides. However, Spangler realizes this, and instead shows the cadets embarrassing slides of Francis.
5	5	"Malcolm Babysits"	Jeff Melman	Maggie Bandur & Pang-Ni Landrum	February 13, 2000	06-99-105	18.05
When bugs take over the house due to Dewey stashing old food inside the walls, the whole family is forced to live in a trailer owned by Lois' coworker, Craig, while their house is being fumigated. However, Malcolm ends up spending more time at the home of an upper-middle-class family who has hired him as their babysitter, which he prefers to staying with his family, but he soon learns that the parents have been secretly videotaping him to judge his bad behavior. He later blackmails the family with evidence of their affairs and illegal practices to leave him alone, and he quits. Meanwhile, Francis finds the corpse of a missing janitor in the basement of Marlin Academy, and teams up with his friends to give him a Norse funeral, which goes wrong when the corpse blows up in a fiery explosion.
6	6	"Sleepover"	Ken Kwapis	Dan Kopelman	February 20, 2000	06-99-110	15.90
Malcolm spends the night at Stevie's, but finds his parents to be overbearing. After they are put to bed early, Malcolm convinces Stevie to sneak out to an arcade downtown. As they leave, they realize that Stevie's wheelchair has been stolen, and they look for it, tracking it down to two older teenagers, who run off and leave them the wheelchair. Meanwhile, to prove that he is mature, Lois challenges Reese to put Dewey to sleep in exchange for being allowed to watch a horror movie; the task proves more difficult than Reese expected, and ends with him falling asleep from exhaustion as Dewey watches the movie. Francis is hazed by a group of upperclassmen, dubbed the "Brothers of the Apocalypse", who engage in cult-like behavior. When he is kidnapped, he tells them that their tricks are amateurish compared to Lois' behavior, and so the students decide to worship her and adopt her ways.
7	7	"Francis Escapes"	Todd Holland	Linwood Boomer	February 27, 2000	06-99-101	16.06
Francis deserts from Marlin Academy to reunite with his girlfriend, Bebe, and he hides out in the family's backyard, telling Malcolm not to tell them. However, Bebe breaks up with him as soon as they reunite, and Lois soon finds out that Francis has left school, but does not know where he went. Malcolm tries to keep it a secret, but Lois pushes him into tattling, causing her to go looking for Francis. After Hal finds him, he sympathetically decides to drive him across the country back to military school so Lois won't find him. Meanwhile, the boys tell Dewey that there is a monster under his bed, scaring him; when he hears Malcolm talking to Francis in the backyard, Malcolm lies and says that he was speaking with the monster. After Bebe breaks up with him, Francis begins to cry, which Dewey mistakes for the monster's roar, and he unintentionally hurls rocks at his brother.
8	8	"Krelboyne Picnic"	Todd Holland	Michael Glouberman & Andrew Orenstein	March 12, 2000	06-99-109	14.19
The family spend the day at 'Cirque de Krelboyne', a picnic where Malcolm's classmates demonstrate their academic abilities, something Malcolm feels ashamed he has brought his brothers to. Hal violates the picnic's vegetarian policy by bringing a meat-filled cooler, giving the people food that they all spit out in disgust. Lois also starts a rivalry with a woman on the PTA who strictly oversees the food and drinks at the picnic, tossing out Lois' brownies. Reese looks forward to bullying and beating up the "Krelboynes", but is soon on the receiving end when one of them gets his older brother involved, who pins a remorseful Reese to a fence. Despite Malcolm's attempts to escape, he is eventually forced to take the stage at the talent show, where he stuns the audience with his mathematical prowess. Concurrently, Francis meets another sibling, who soon becomes his girlfriend, but they break up immediately after an argument.
9	9	"Lois vs. Evil"	Todd Holland	Jack Amiel & Michael Begler	March 19, 2000	06-99-104	16.29
Lois finds out that Dewey stole a $150 bottle of cognac from the store she works at. She makes him return it, but finds that she has been fired by an assistant manager named Mr. Pinter who has been bullying Lois for her entire time there. This leaves the family struggling financially, especially when Hal eats peaches, a food he's allergic to, and they get back an expensive hospital bill. Lois gets her job back from Pinter when she confronts him for his own misbehavior, which all the other employees overhear, resulting in Pinter quitting. Concurrently, Francis, while volunteering at a beauty pageant, gains special backstage dressing room access when some of the contestants think he's gay. He tries to tell one of the contestants that he wants to become straight, and that she could help him, but she instead sends him to a Christian conversion camp.
10	10	"Stock Car Races"	Todd Holland	David Richardson	April 2, 2000	06-99-102	13.12
Hal sneaks the boys out of school and takes them to a stock car race. Bored, the boys try to sneak on the pit lanes, causing them to be sent to the security guard's office, where they run off with Hal. At home, Lois' hunt for her lost paycheck unearths incriminating items that Hal and the kids have stashed around the house, while Malcolm's teacher comes over, sparking a friendship as she helps Lois look. Meanwhile, fed up with Spangler and his noisy dog that all the cadets hate, Francis sneaks a large snake named Otis into the academy and stashes it in his locker. The snake soon escapes and eats the dog, resulting in Spangler punishing all the cadets, but they are too excited about the dog being gone to care.
11	11	"Funeral"	Arlene Sanford	Maggie Bandur & Pang-Ni Landrum	April 9, 2000	06-99-111	15.19
The family prepares for their Aunt Helen's funeral, but, after Malcolm gives her a hard time arguing about skipping it to go to a concert with Julie (Landry Allbright), a girl he likes, Lois gives up and decides to take a bubble bath while everyone else does their own things. Hal listens to his old record player, while Dewey invites a friend—who he nicknames "Egg"—and after they leave a spill in the kitchen, they make a bigger mess trying to clean it. Julie comes to see Malcolm, but she catches him changing in his underwear and runs away, getting injured when slipping on the spill. Malcolm takes Francis' advice to use a scapegoat, and tells his parents that Reese broke Dewey's birthday present and planned to stash the remains in Aunt Helen's coffin. Lois promptly decides that they will attend the funeral after all so Reese can apologize, and they attend it while he stands in the corner, punished.
12	12	"Cheerleader"	Todd Holland	Dan Kopelman	April 16, 2000	06-99-112	12.91
Reese joins the cheerleading squad to get closer to a girl he has a crush on; Malcolm is embarrassed to have a cheerleader brother, but he ends up helping Reese learn his routines anyway. Dewey desperately tries to talk Lois into buying him a new toy, and, upon getting it, decides to break it. Hal, seeing Reese cry and practice cheerleading routines with Malcolm, tries to give all the boys "the talk", but only upsets Reese more. After Francis gets in trouble, Spangler attempts to reach out to him by telling him a story of his youth, only for Francis to push Spangler into admitting he hates his mother, much like Francis does.
13	13	"Rollerskates"	Ken Kwapis	Alan J. Higgins	April 30, 2000	06-99-108	14.24
Malcolm decides to take roller skating lessons from Hal, who enthusiastically takes it too seriously and is overly critical of Malcolm, leading Malcolm to yell "fuck you" at him. Meanwhile, Lois throws out her back by screaming too loud at Reese, and refuses to take painkillers, which Reese sneaks in her milk, leaving her unable both to scold the boys for their behavior, and to help Hal with his issue with Malcolm. At Marlin Academy, Francis fakes the same back injury to get out of a wilderness survival exercise at the academy, but is caught and thrown into the woods tied up with no supplies.
14	14	"The Bots and the Bees"	Chris Koch	Alan J. Higgins & David Richardson	May 7, 2000	06-00-202	12.42
Lois visits Francis at military school after he has a medical emergency, and quickly gets along well with the rest of the academy, upsetting Francis. Hal, no longer under Lois' supervision, quickly regresses into his rambunctious teenage persona, resuming his smoking, refusing to show up to work, and letting Reese and Dewey get away with everything. Malcolm and the "Krelboynes" decide to enter a killer robot competition, but Hal takes over the project and builds a dangerous robot complete with a bee cannon, to the point that the boys are forced to launch the bees onto him so he'll return to normal.
15	15	"Smunday"	Jeff Melman	Michael Glouberman & Andrew Orenstein	May 14, 2000	06-00-201	12.56
A sick, bedridden Lois does not realize she has spent two days in bed, and, assuming it is Sunday when it is actually Monday, does not make the boys go to school—or lift their latest grounding about giving away Dewey's bike. The boys are initially happy to get the day off school, but soon realize their mistake, as they cannot leave the house in case someone sees them and tells Lois. Francis calls the boys about hiding an incriminating letter home about his latest offense at the academy, but Lois ends up finding it anyway. Caught up with both her flu and Francis' misdemeanor, she ignores punishing the boys for skipping school. Out of fear of Lois sending Francis to a prison farm, the boys try to come up with a prank that will make Lois divert her attention from Francis. Meanwhile, Hal visits a Porsche dealership and ends up ruining a car because he caught Lois' flu. The salesman drives Hal home in the car, where it is further damaged by the boys' prank.
16	16	"Waterpark"	Ken Kwapis	Maggie Bandur & Pang-Ni Landrum	May 21, 2000	06-00-203	14.39
The family takes a trip to a water park, where Lois and Hal try to avoid the boys and have fun. Malcolm and Reese engage in an escalating war of pranks. After they spill Lois and Hal's food and drink, she berates them at the top of a large water slide. Malcolm pushes her in, but she grabs both of them they go down together as she still yells. Dewey, unable to go because of an ear infection, is left with a strict elderly babysitter, Mrs. White (Bea Arthur), who he bonds with, but she collapses and is taken away in an ambulance. Dewey chases a blowing red balloon, and wanders off. Spangler learns that Francis has been letting him win at pool to keep him in a good mood, threatening to punish Francis if he loses again, while the other cadets threaten to beat him up if he wins. When Francis misses an easy shot, Spangler starts trying to throw the match, resulting in both trying their best to lose.

== Production ==
=== Development ===
Malcolm in the Middle was created by Linwood Boomer, for the American network UPN for the 1998-99 television season. Four months later, the network passed on the series, as they felt it did not fit their target demographic. Soon thereafter, Doug Herzog, then-president of the Fox Broadcasting Company's entertainment division, heard about the project, and quickly greenlit it, but decided to wait until the 2000 mid-season to air it. He committed the series to a thirteen episode season, with the possibility of further renewals. Boomer based the series on his own life and childhood, something that drew Herzog to it, who felt the storylines revolving around the children were similar to experiences he had with his own young children. Similar to Malcolm, Boomer grew up with three brothers, but had a "no-nonsense" mother on account of his father's death, with that characteristic helping to shape Lois' character. He called the central family a "gigantically exaggerated and self-serving version" of his family and childhood, which gave him some inspiration for the series.

=== Casting ===
Frankie Muniz's audition was around 9:30 in the morning, and he had another audition for a Pizza Hut commercial 30 minutes later. Muniz, worried he would miss the Pizza Hut audition, pleaded to his mother to let him skip his Malcolm in the Middle audition, but he ultimately went. Initially, Malcolm was written to be a nine year old. While auditioning, Muniz, who was around twelve to thirteen, thought that they would pass on him, since he was "too old". However, the producers were impressed with Muniz's performance, so he was cast, and the character was aged up to thirteen. In the season, Malcolm's age is intentionally not mentioned, explicitly stating that he attends middle school, "not the actual grade level."

Aaron Paul was interested in auditioning for the role of Malcolm's eldest brother Francis, being given the script, but the producers were not interested in casting him and "kept passing". Instead, the role went to Christopher Kennedy Masterson, who only had to audition once, unlike every other applicant, and got the job soon after. Around the time of pilot season, Jane Kaczmarek got pregnant, and asked her agents not to send her any auditions, as she wanted to focus on her family with Bradley Whitford, but series casting director Mary Fox persuaded her agents to send her the script for Malcolm in the Middle's pilot. She initially did not want to play Lois, even after receiving the script, but was intrigued by the fact that they personally sent it to her; Kaczmarek enjoyed how "quirky and endearing" Lois was, so she accepted the role.

Justin Berfield was cast as Malcolm's older brother Reese, despite the fact that Berfield is younger than Muniz, and Erik Per Sullivan portrays youngest brother Dewey. Catherine Lloyd Burns plays Malcolm's teacher Caroline Miller in the season. The character of Hal was initially underwritten, and described by Boomer as "a writer's conceit that just lay there on the page like a turd", only having about five lines in the pilot to add to the illusion aspect they were going for. During Bryan Cranston's audition for the part, he had to simply listen to a fight between a mother character and her sons, only sitting there without conversing. At that time, Cranston put a pipe in his mouth and intently watched the fight, causing Boomer to fall from his chair in laughter. Boomer recalled that Cranston "just had this vast inner life going on" that contributed to his performance as Hal. He described Cranston's look at that time as a man who "looks like he's listening, but he's actually building a rocket ship in his head", and Cranston was given the role immediately.

=== Filming and directing ===
Hal in a bee suit, from "The Bots and the Bees". Bryan Cranston wore a live bee suit for the scene, and was only stung once.

As opposed to a soundstage, much of the filming for the season was done on location from 1999 to 2000. Unlike other sitcoms, they avoided including laugh tracks or a studio audience for recordings, and filming was accomplished with single-camera to achieve a more "cinematic look". A privately owned home, located at 12334 Cantura Street in Studio City, California, was rented for up to $3,000 a day to act as the family's house for scenes requiring it. Each episode cost roughly $1,000,000 to make, particularly for its unique visual style that made it more expensive to produce, whereas most other sitcoms cost $750,000 an episode.

For the episode "Rollerskates", Cranston learned how to skate and performed most of his skating scenes, while a stunt double was used for the more intricate tricks. During "The Bots and the Bees", Cranston wore a suit of live bees that moved on his body for an extended period of time. He was covered in 10,000 bees, but only got stung once, during which he did not flinch. Studio filming took place on Stage 21 at CBS Studio Center in Studio City, and was used for the interior of the home and the backyard. The middle school play-yard's set was located at the northern point of the CBS studio property near Radford Avenue.

== Release ==
During season one, the series aired on Sundays at 8:30 p.m. EST. The season originally aired on the Fox Network from January 9, 2000, through May 21, 2000, in sixteen episodes. It aired as a mid-season replacement, a deliberate decision by Herzog to boost ratings and garner attention. It was first released on home media in the United States on October 29, 2002, on the Malcolm in the Middle: Season 1 DVD box set by 20th Century Fox Home Entertainment. The set contains several extras, including audio commentary from some of the cast and crew on the extended pilot, and only for select scenes throughout the remaining episodes. Also available is a short where Cranston discusses how the series was shot in widescreen, a 40-minute documentary detailing the history of the series, alternative cold opens for some episodes, deleted scenes, a gag reel, and a short revolving around Dewey.

== Reception ==
=== Ratings ===
The series started off with very high ratings for the Fox Network, with its mid-season slot and airtime directly after The Simpsons contributing to its success. At the time of airing, the first season of Malcolm in the Middle was the number one most-watched primetime series among teenagers, the number one most-popular new show with children, and the second most-watched for total viewers. It ranked fifth for comedy series in the 18-49 age demographic, and second amongst male viewers in that same demographic.

The series premiere, "Pilot", which garnered 22.35 million viewers, was the highest rated premiere for the network since the first episode of The Simpsons in 1989. Ratings for the season quickly grew, with the following episode, "Red Dress", reaching a series high of 23.24 million. The lowest ratings for the season came from the fourteenth episode, "The Bots and the Bees", which attracted 12.42 million viewers, and stayed the lowest of the series until the second episode of the next season, "Halloween Approximately", at 9.18 million. The season ended on 14.39 million viewers with "Waterpark", the highest since episode eleven: "Funeral" at 15.19 million.

=== Critical response ===
The review aggregator website Rotten Tomatoes calculated an approval rating of 100%, based on 23 reviews, with an average rating of 7.5/10. The site's consensus reads, "Malcolm in the Middle blasts out of the gate with a startlingly adept child performance from Frankie Muniz, a robust family ensemble, and a distinctive, punchy visual style." On Metacritic, the season has an 88% score based on 25 reviews, indicating "Universal acclaim".

Variety writer Ramin Zahed praised the series for its "fresh" take on the sitcom formula, enjoying the first episode's instant work to get the audience familiar with the series' world. Despite finding the use of Malcolm speaking to the audience annoying, Zahed highlighted the performance of each cast member, the series' "sentimental side", and unique visual style that helped to differentiate it from other sitcoms at the time. Linda Stasi of New York Post, comparing to The Wonder Years for its ability to adhere to the family dynamic of the time it came out in, stating that the series was one she wished to see more of, and calling Dewey her favorite character.

Entertainment Weekly's Ken Tucker gave the series an A− in his review, feeling it was revolutionary for its subversion of the sitcom genre and unique humor, which was able to poke fun at unusual kids like Malcolm in a way that isn't mean-spirited or stereotypical. Tucker highlighted the performances of Muniz, Cranston, and Kaczmarek, who he felt was one of its strongest aspects for her portrayal of Lois. Bernard Weinraub of The New York Times appreciated the honest portrayal of an American family that the season had, acting as a fresh twist on families usually seen on television. Similarly, he also commended its humor that didn't rely on laugh tracks, instead opting for a single-camera setup that allowed for innovative humor, particularly around Hal and Lois, who he highlighted as standouts of the cast.

DVD Talk writer Aaron Beierle praised Malcolm in the Middle for, as he felt, redefining the trope of a dysfunctional family on television. Despite asserting that the series got repetitive quickly after a few seasons, Beierle still commended the first season for its "classic" episodes like "Rollerskates"—which he labeled as Cranston's greatest performance—"Smunday", "Home Alone 4" and "Pilot". When the series first premiered in the U.K. on BBC2 in 2001, The Observer's Stephanie Merritt commended multiple different aspects of the series, such as Muniz's performance, the directing style, and strong scripts reminiscent of The Simpsons, calling it "a far cry from our own recent sorry efforts at US-style sitcoms".

=== Awards and nominations ===
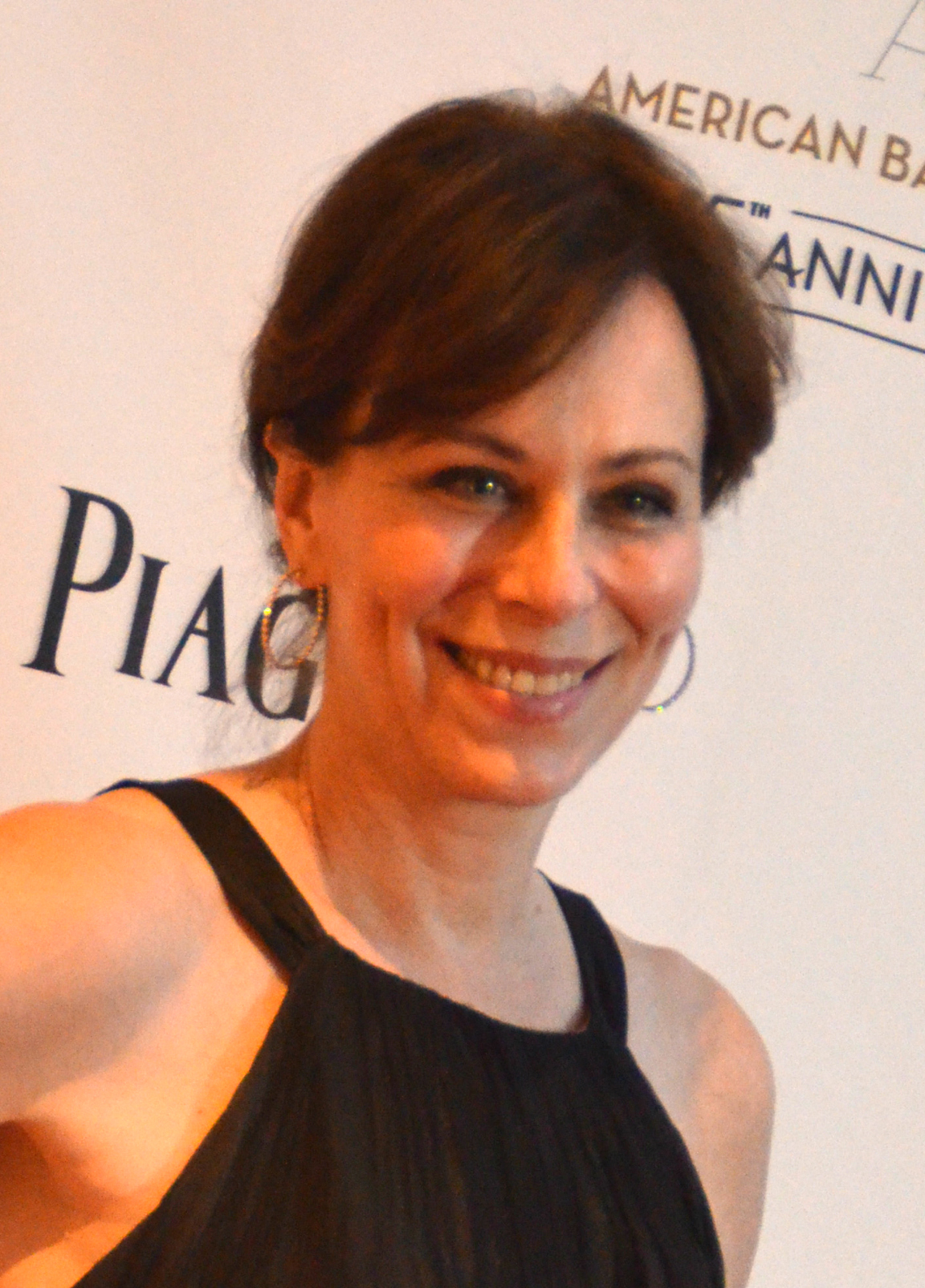
Jane Kaczmarek received the most award nominations for the season, with five nominations and two wins.

At the 52nd Primetime Emmy Awards, several cast and crew members received awards: Todd Holland received an Outstanding Directing for a Comedy Series nomination for his work on "Pilot", which he won; Kaczmarek and Bea Arthur were respectively nominated for Outstanding Lead Actress in a Comedy Series and Outstanding Guest Actress in a Comedy Series, both losing; Boomer won for Outstanding Writing for a Comedy Series for "Pilot", and Ken Miller, Mary V. Buck, Nikki Valko, and Susan Edelman were nominated for Outstanding Casting for a Comedy Series. Muniz and Kaczmarek were nominated for Best Actor and Actress in a Television Series Musical or Comedy, and the season itself for Best Television Series – Musical or Comedy at the 58th Golden Globes; none of the three won their respective nominations. Kaczmarek was nominated for Outstanding Performance by a Female Actor in a Comedy Series'at the 7th Screen Actors Guild Awards for his role as Lois in the season.

In 2001, at the American Comedy Awards, Kaczmarek and Arthur received nominations for Funniest Leading Role Female Performer in a TV Series and Funniest Female Guest Appearance in a TV Series, retrospectively, for which they both won. Holland, for his work on "Pilot", was nominated for Outstanding Directorial Achievement in Comedy Series at the 53rd Directors Guild of America Awards, which he lost to James Burrows for Will & Grace. At the 16th TCA Awards, the season received a nomination for Outstanding Achievement in Comedy and Outstanding New Program, winning the former; Muniz and Kaczmarek also received nominations for Individual Achievement in Comedy at the same ceremony, with Kaczmarek winning.
