= Roller skate (disambiguation) =

A roller skate is a shoe or binding mounted on wheels.

Roller skate may also refer to

- "Roller Skate" (Natasha Bedingfield song), 2019
- "Roller Skate" (Sheryl Crow song), 2017
- "Roller Skate" (Vaughan Mason & Crew song), 1980
- "Brand New Key", also known as "The Roller Skate Song"

== See also ==
- Roller Skates, a 1936 children's book by Ruth Sawyer
- "Rollerskates" (Malcolm in the Middle), a sitcom episode
