= List of Malcolm in the Middle characters =

The cast of Malcolm in the Middle in season 1, featuring Malcolm (front), Dewey (middle, left), Reese (middle, right), Francis (back, left), Lois (back, middle), and Hal (back, right).

The American television comedy series Malcolm in the Middle has featured an extensive cast of characters. The series was originally televised from 2000 to 2006 on the Fox Network, before a reunion miniseries aired in April 2026 on the streaming service Disney+.

== Characters ==
Originally, the series featured four brothers, although Malcolm's oldest brother attended a military school away from home, so Malcolm was still the middle sibling left at home. A youngest son named Jamie was introduced in the show's fourth season. The boys are, from eldest to youngest: Francis, Reese, Malcolm, Dewey, and Jamie. In the final episode, Lois discovered she was pregnant with a sixth child. In the third season, Francis travels home to celebrate his father's birthday bringing a Native Alaskan woman, Piama, and reveals that they are married.

During the show, the family's name was kept a secret. In the fifth-season episode "Reese Joins the Army (1)", Reese uses a fake ID by the name of "Jetson" to lie about his age. In the series finale, "Graduation", Francis' employee ID reads "Nolastname" (or "No Last Name", a joke referring to the fact that the family name was never spoken aloud). In the same episode, when Malcolm was introduced to give the graduation speech, the speaker announces Malcolm's name, but microphone feedback makes his surname inaudible, even though he does appear to mouth the phrase "No last name".

The DVD insert from season five shows the family surname as "Wilkerson" in the description of the episode "Block Party". While this last name is referenced via Easter eggs in "Pilot", "Dinner Out", and "Company Picnic Pt. 1", the characters' lack of a surname remains a running gag throughout the series.

== Overview ==
= Main cast (credited)
= Recurring cast (4+)
= Guest cast (1–3)

Actor/Actress	Character	Seasons							Life's Still Unfair
Actor/Actress	Character	1	2	3	4	5	6	7	Life's Still Unfair
Main characters
Jane Kaczmarek	Lois	Main	Main	Main	Main	Main	Main	Main	Main
Bryan Cranston	Hal	Main	Main	Main	Main	Main	Main	Main	Main
Christopher Kennedy Masterson	Francis	Main	Main	Main	Main	Main	Main	Main	Main
Frankie Muniz	Malcolm	Main	Main	Main	Main	Main	Main	Main	Main
Justin Berfield	Reese	Main	Main	Main	Main	Main	Main	Main	Main
Erik Per Sullivan	Dewey	Main	Main	Main	Main	Main	Main	Main	
Caleb Ellsworth-Clark	Dewey								Recurring
Catherine Lloyd Burns	Caroline Miller	Main (Note: Only receives main billing for the episodes in which she appears)	Main						
Keeley Karsten	Leah								Main
Vaughan Murrae	Kelly								Main
Kiana Madeira	Tristan								Main
Recurring characters
Craig Lamar Traylor	Stevie Kenarban	Recurring	Recurring	Recurring	Recurring	Recurring	Recurring	Recurring	Recurring
David Anthony Higgins	Craig Feldspar	Recurring	Recurring	Recurring	Recurring	Recurring	Recurring	Recurring	Recurring
Gary Anthony Williams	Abe Kenarban	Guest	Recurring	Recurring	Recurring	Recurring	Recurring	Recurring	Recurring
Evan Matthew Cohen	Lloyd	Recurring	Recurring	Recurring	Recurring				Guest
Kyle Sullivan	Dabney	Recurring	Recurring	Recurring	Recurring				Guest
Daniel von Bargen	Edwin Spangler	Recurring	Recurring	Recurring	Flashback				
Todd Giebenhain	Richie	Recurring	Recurring	Guest					Recurring
Will Jennings	Kyle	Recurring	Recurring						
Drew Powell	Drew Horton	Recurring	Recurring						Guest
Arjay Smith	Ken Finley	Recurring	Recurring						Guest
Karim Prince	Stanley Winn	Recurring							
Paul Willson	Ed	Recurring		Guest		Guest			
Landry Allbright	Julie	Recurring							
Parker Mills	Circus	Recurring							
Justin Pierce	Justin	Recurring							
Eric Nenninger	Eric Hansen	Guest	Recurring	Recurring	Flashback				Guest
Merrin Dungey	Kitty Kenarban	Guest	Recurring	Guest			Guest		Guest
Kasan Butcher	Joe	Guest	Recurring						
Adam Hendershott	Adam	Recurring							
Jose Espinoza	Jose	Guest	Guest						
Beth Grant	Doreen Hooper	Guest			Guest				
Tania Raymonde	Cynthia		Recurring	Guest	Guest				
Cloris Leachman	Ida		Guest	Guest	Recurring	Recurring	Recurring	Recurring	
Chris Eigeman	Lionel Herkabe			Recurring	Recurring	Guest	Recurring	Guest	
Dan Martin	Malik			Recurring	Recurring		Guest	Guest	Guest
Alex Morris	Trey			Recurring	Recurring		Guest	Guest	Guest
Edward James Gage	Brian			Recurring	Recurring		Guest	Guest	
John Marshall Jones	Brian								Guest
Jonathan Craig Williams	Steve			Recurring	Recurring		Guest	Guest	Guest
Victor Z. Isaac	Kevin			Recurring	Recurring				Guest
Brenda Wehle	Lavernia			Recurring					
Sandy Ward	Pete			Recurring					
John Ennis	Artie			Recurring					
Richard Gross	Dave			Recurring					
Ivan Naranjo	Ivan			Recurring					
Amy Farrington	Karen			Recurring					
Emy Coligado	Piama Tananahaakna			Recurring	Recurring	Recurring	Recurring	Recurring	Recurring
Kenneth Mars	Otto Mannkusser				Recurring	Recurring			
Meagen Fay	Gretchen Mannkusser				Recurring	Recurring			Guest
Brittany Renee Finamore	Alison				Recurring				
Reagan Dale Neis	Nikki				Recurring				
Michael Shamus Wiles	Boyd				Recurring				
Hayden Panettiere	Jessica				Guest		Guest	Recurring	
Jonny Acker	Ira Prescott				Guest	Recurring			
Jack McGee	Coach Oleski				Guest	Guest			
James and Lukas Rodriguez	Jamie				Recurring	Recurring	Recurring	Recurring	
Anthony Timpano	Jamie								Recurring
Julie Hagerty	Polly					Recurring			
Cameron Monaghan	Chad					Guest	Recurring		
Danny McCarthy Jr.	David Hanson					Guest	Recurring		
Amy Bruckner	Zoe					Guest	Recurring		
Tricia O'Kelley	Mrs. Welsh					Guest	Guest		
Rose Abdoo	Margie						Guest	Guest	
Steve Vinovich	Mr. Hodges							Recurring	
Rheagan Wallace	Raduca							Recurring	

== Main ==
=== Hal ===
Hal, played by Bryan Cranston (155 episodes), is the father of the family. Though relaxed in his parenting when compared to Lois, Hal has shown that he can slide into a disciplinarian when confronted by the boys' bad behavior. He was a rebel like his sons, especially Francis, until he married Lois and she nurtured him. He comes from a wealthy family who resent his choice to marry Lois over Susan (a sentiment also shared by Victor and Ida). Hal has a hard time making good decisions, which he often defers to Lois. Hal blends in well with his neighbors despite many of the neighbors hating his boys and Lois. He loves Lois more than she loves him, never even thinking about other women. He is also very scared of her, even more than the boys are, which is why he bribes his sons to take the fall for his wrongdoings. He is very devoted to Lois and willing to give the boys punishment they deserve that Lois gives them. Lois is usually head of the household and Hal is second-in-command. He is very neurotic and has a slight obsessive-compulsive disorder, and also enjoys unusual hobbies. Briefs are his underpants of choice. Hal also has a loving and highly active sex life with Lois, as revealed in the episode "Poker 2" when Hal tells his friends he has sex 14 times per week. It is mentioned again in the episode "Forbidden Girlfriend" when Hal and Lois struggle to cope when Lois takes a medication and is unable to have sex for an entire week. It was also revealed that Hal was a chain smoker before quitting the habit. Hal's best friend is Abe Kenarban. Hal works in a lower management job in a corporation that he always hated. He used to be an executive and got demoted when he mouthed off to his boss in the season 2 finale. Hal is usually seen driving a late 1980s to early 1990s Dodge Dynasty.

=== Francis ===
Francis, played by Christopher Kennedy Masterson (122 episodes), is the oldest of the brothers, whom Malcolm often looks up to. According to the season 1 episodes "Sleepover" and "The Bots and the Bees", Francis was a breech birth. The season 2 episode "Flashback" reveals that Lois was in labor with him during her and Hal's wedding. A rebel from birth, showing signs of attention deficit hyperactivity disorder and conduct disorder, Francis was exiled to the Marlin Academy military school by Lois for his behavior. By season 3, he emancipates himself and runs away from the academy to work in Alaska, incurring his mother's wrath. Shortly after moving to Alaska, he marries a local Native Alaskan woman about one year older than him named Piama, who had a previous brief marriage, though Lois disapproves. During the fourth and fifth season, Francis works at a dude ranch owned by Otto Mannkusser and his wife Gretchen. Francis is mostly absent for the last two seasons, but, in the series finale, Hal discovers that he has taken a job with Amerysis Industries, a large corporation where Francis works in a cubicle and inputs numbers into a computer, and is also still happily married to Piama. Although Francis enjoys the job, he refuses to tell Lois about it, as he enjoys torturing her by telling her that he is still unemployed.

=== Malcolm ===
Malcolm, played by actor Frankie Muniz (in a total of 154 episodes), is the titular main protagonist and occasional narrator of this series. He is approximately five years younger than his oldest brother Francis, one year younger than his older brother Reese, five years older than their younger brother Dewey, and about 15 years older than their youngest brother Jamie. In the first episode of the series, he is discovered to be a child prodigy with an IQ of 165 and is immediately moved from his regular class into the "Krelboynes", a class for gifted students. Despite his high intelligence, he still gets into mischief either alongside or working against his brothers (in particular, his older brother Reese), although he becomes more self-centered and vain in the later seasons as he goes through puberty. Being a genius, Malcolm often serves as the ring leader in the brothers' juvenile schemes. According to Hal, in "Stock Car Races" (season 1), Malcolm was named after Hal's favorite Stock Car Racer, Rusty Malcolm, although he had previously argued with Lois about giving the name to Francis and Reese. Malcolm, like Reese, is very unpopular at school, yet he has had a number of girlfriends during the series run. Like Lois, he gets angry or frustrated very easily but he also has problems containing his opinion about himself. Malcolm also occasionally serves as the voice of reason, and does have a conscience. For instance, despite emotionally manipulating a grieving Hal to buy him a car in the episode "Hal Grieves," when the time comes to make the purchase, he feels guilty (but just as Hal begins to sign, Lois finally turns up and she, not Malcolm, puts an end to it). In the series finale, he begins taking classes at Harvard University. Throughout the series, Malcolm frequently breaks the fourth wall and talks to the viewer about either the current situation or provides exposition about past events. In the revival series, Malcom runs a food charity that uses advanced computer systems to distribute unused food. He is a single father to a teenage daughter named Leah and has kept his family at a distance for over a decade.

=== Lois ===
Lois (unknown surname, née Welker), played by Jane Kaczmarek (150 episodes), is Francis, Reese, Malcolm, Dewey, and Jamie's temperamental and overbearing mother. She is despised by the neighbors to the point that they refuse to invite her to their gatherings, revealed in "Mono". Unlike Malcolm, Lois is not bothered by it and tries her best to blend in with it. Lois is 38 years old as of Season 2, and had originally planned to attend music school and become a concert violinist before she married Hal ("Lois' Birthday"). She was revealed to be a charming and nurturing mother while Francis was little, but toughened up. When she became more overbearing and demanding, it did not help Francis or the other boys to behave, but she unknowingly made it worse. She also stubbornly believes she is always in the right, to the point of being unable to say that she was wrong. Lois's severe anger issues are very often caused by her sons' frequent bad behavior, and also from her miserable childhood. Her uncaring parents Ida and Victor favored her younger sister, Susan. Lois and Susan would later have a serious falling out after it is revealed that Hal was originally Susan's boyfriend. She is a pushy mother and in the series finale, it is revealed that she is trying to groom Malcolm to become President of the United States. The finale also reveals that she is pregnant again. Lois is usually seen driving the family's early 1990s Plymouth Grand Voyager.

=== Reese ===
Reese, played by Justin Berfield (155 episodes), is the second-oldest of the brothers. He is about three years younger than his brother Francis, one year older than his brother Malcolm, six years older than his brother Dewey, and about 16 years older than his youngest brother Jamie. It was revealed in the episode "Flashback", in season 2, that Reese has been vicious from the womb, so vicious in fact that when he kept kicking Lois during labor, she pushed him out by force. In Clip Show #2, he is revealed to have directly caused Lois' staph infection due to his uncontrollable kicking in her womb. Reese is the worst-behaved of the brothers and generally feels little to no empathy towards those he torments. Reese is the most frequently punished of his brothers to the point where he treats being grounded by Lois as an everyday occurrence. At the beginning of the series, Reese is the school's top bully and is often inclined to beat up the Krelboynes, except Stevie who is in a wheelchair. Despite his infamous reputation as a bully, Reese has at times been shown to be intimidated by people who are stronger than him. Considered to be the least intelligent of his brothers, Reese often has the Krelboynes do his schoolwork for him. Despite this, Reese is actually a culinary prodigy, after finding that he has a talent and genuine love for cooking and baking to the point where he is put in charge of cooking for holidays and special events. He is also considered by others to be an evil genius when it comes to bullying, tormenting, blackmailing and beating up others for his own satisfaction. He is the favorite grandson of his grandmother Ida, who taught him the importance of having patsies. In the series finale, Reese moves in with Craig Feldspar and is a janitor at his alma mater North High.

=== Dewey ===
Dewey, played by Erik Per Sullivan (151 episodes) and Caleb Ellsworth-Clark (4 episodes), is portrayed as being the quieter, more innocent brother but becomes just as spiteful and destructive as his older brothers as the series progressed. Initially the youngest brother, Dewey is regularly bullied by both Malcolm and Reese for years to the point where he becomes completely immune to their torture methods. He is also frequently underestimated by his brothers to the point where they sometimes find themselves at his mercy. Despite this, he partakes in many of the brothers' juvenile schemes and is just as spiteful and vindictive as they are. Dewey is more inclined to the arts than his brothers. He soon finds he is a musical prodigy, and as the series goes on he becomes more caring and thoughtful especially in regards to his younger brother Jamie, whom he decides not to bully like he was by Malcolm and Reese. Lois remarks at one point that unlike Malcolm, who would have to work hard to achieve success, Dewey would have success handed to him. Dewey joins the Buseys, a class for the emotionally disturbed, by mistake and ends up becoming their unofficial teacher. He ended up caring for his fellow students so much that, when the mistake was uncovered, he feigned severe emotional problems so he could remain. In the final few seasons, Dewey becomes increasingly bitter towards his parents due to them overlooking him throughout his childhood and neglecting his interests. Because of this, he forces them to give Jamie the childhood he never had. In the last episode, he and Jamie (the only other remaining brother living at home) continued the tradition of causing havoc all over the house. In the revival series, he is shown to be spending a lot of time touring the world as a successful musician.

=== Caroline Miller ===
Caroline Miller, played by Catherine Lloyd Burns (10 episodes), is the primary teacher of Malcolm's "Krelboyne" class in the first two seasons. She is shown to be overly-earnest as well as to adore Malcolm. In season 1, she is included as part of the main cast, but in season 2, is a recurring character. In season 2, she is shown to be pregnant until she gives birth to her baby in the parking lot. After her baby was born, she quit teaching. She was never seen or mentioned again after season 2. Originally, she was going to continue to be part of the main cast, and would become antagonistic towards the Krelboynes after the parking lot incident, but Burns left the show as she didn't want to suddenly play a meaner character. Lionel Herkabe replaced her, a character who was originally more sympathetic and locked horns with a now meaner Caroline.

=== Jamie ===
Jamie, played by identical twin sisters Kara and Jessica Sanford (21 episodes) as a baby, identical twin brothers James and Lukas Rodriguez (35 episodes) as a toddler, and Anthony Timpano (3 episodes) as an adult, is the fifth child and youngest son born to Hal and Lois. He is the only brother who beats Lois at her own game, bordering to attacking her (though Reese is mostly responsible for feeding him soda). Like Malcolm and Dewey, Jamie is intelligent, as evidenced when he tricks Reese into taking a marker after coloring part of a wall. The revival series revealed that he has joined the US Coast Guard.

=== Piama ===
Piama (unknown surname, née Tananahaakna), played by Emy Coligado (32 episodes), is Francis' wife whom he meets and marries off-screen during his year in Alaska. Piama was born on an Native Alaskan reservation, is about a year older than Francis, and was married once before meeting him. Primarily due to her being brought home under volatile circumstances, in which Francis (while still a minor, although emancipated) shocks the family with news of the marriage and thus disrupting Hal's birthday party, Lois dislikes Piama from her introduction in the third season and into the fourth. However, after an embarrassing encounter with her wealthy in-laws, Lois starts to respect Piama more. Piama is against having children until the series finale, when one of Reese's pranks goes awry. The revival revealed that she has finally gotten pregnant.

=== Kelly ===
Kelly, played by Vaughan Murrae (4 episodes), is Hal and Lois's self-sufficient, studious, non-binary youngest child, with whom Lois becomes pregnant at the end of the original series. In the revival, they are an older teenager serving as the family's informant.

=== Leah ===
Leah, played by Keeley Karsten (4 episodes), is the daughter of Malcolm, introduced in the revival series. Her biological mother, Dreamer, abandoned her and Malcolm three days after she was born. She is much more held together than Malcolm and has inherited his fourth wall breaking.

=== Tristan ===
Tristan, played by Kiana Madeira (4 episodes), is the girlfriend of Malcolm, introduced in the revival series.

== Recurring characters ==
=== The Kenarbans ===
- Stevie Kenarban, played by Craig Lamar Traylor (59 episodes), is Malcolm's best friend and classmate. He is a paraplegic, asthmatic and was born with one lung, requiring him to speak slowly and take deep breaths approximately every 1-3 words. Though Malcolm is initially upset when Lois arranges a "playdate" for him and Stevie in the pilot episode, the boys immediately find common ground, particularly their love of comic books, and become friends. His parents are very overprotective of him, although Stevie displays in many episodes that he lives very comfortably with his disability and even has a dark sense of humor about it. In the revival, Stevie is married to a man named Glenn, whom he calls "needy", and they have a son named Max.
- Abe Kenarban, played by Gary Anthony Williams (22 episodes), is Stevie's father and Kitty's husband, and a close family friend of both Lois and particularly Hal. Abe is initially depicted as cowardly and dependent on Kitty's guidance (which he attributes to his upbringing, having been raised by his grandmother and four spinster aunts). However he ultimately becomes more self-reliant after Kitty's departure. Despite this, Abe is more than willing to take Kitty back after her return, going as far as to harbor resentment towards Lois after she criticized Kitty's decision to leave.
- Kitty Kenarban, played by Merrin Dungey (6 episodes), is Stevie's mother and Abe's wife. Because of Dungey's commitment to the ABC series Alias and the CBS series The King of Queens, Kitty remains unseen for much of the series, apparently due to her abandoning her husband and son, which briefly throws Stevie into a deep depression. She returns once in the season 6 episode "Kitty's Back". In the revival, it is revealed that she and Abe got divorced once again, but that deep down, she still loves him
  - Dungey previously played a different character, Malcolm's Teacher before he transferred to the Krelboynes class, in the pilot episode.

=== Krelboynes ===
- Lionel Herkabe, played by Chris Eigeman (9 episodes), is the secondary antagonist of the series, first introduced in season 3 as the Krelboynes' teacher after Caroline leaves. A Krelboyne himself in middle school, he was forced into a teaching career after losing his millions in a failed dot-com company. He is portrayed as a malevolent, cynical, and conniving man who thrives on psychological warfare and making his students suffer. Malcolm especially is a threat to him and quickly becomes his nemesis at school, even blackmailing North High's principal, Block (before Hodges took over), into hiring him as vice principal when Malcolm enrolls there. Mr. Herkabe also intensely enjoys humiliating Reese to antagonize Malcolm more. However, Herkabe's arrogance in confessing that he skipped gym class in his senior year of high school and lied about not taking the course is brought to light, leading to Mr. Hodges revoking his GPA Award in the season 7 episode "Malcolm Defends Reese". He is last seen when Reese tosses dodgeballs at him in P.E. class as an attempt to reclaim his title. Eigeman, originally a replacement for Caroline Miller, was unable to appear in more episodes as Herkabe due to his commitment to the show Gilmore Girls by The WB.
- Cynthia, played by Tania Raymonde (4 episodes), is one of Malcolm's classmates. She has a very extensive vocabulary, but has a difficult time making friends. Depicted as relatively cheerful, Cynthia becomes one of Malcolm's earliest crushes on the show, although a relationship never develops. She does not physically appear in the revival, but gets referenced in a poster in Leah's room, where it's shown that Cynthia is now the lead vocalist for a punk rock band called "Cynthia Says".
- Lloyd Jensen, played by Evan Matthew Cohen (26 episodes), is one of Malcolm's "Krelboyne" classmates who recurs throughout the series. He frequently worries about random small things, gets hurt, and falls victim to bullies. In the revival, he, Dabney, and Kevin work together in a scientific firm and collectively raise a "son", named Hubert.
- Dabney Hooper, played by Kyle Sullivan (25 episodes), is one of Malcolm's "Krelboyne" classmates who recurs throughout the series. Often depicted as the weakest and most cowardly of the group, his overbearing mother almost completely controls his life until his last appearance, in which using paintball as an outlet for his anger towards his mother results in him immediately developing a tougher, if still somewhat socially awkward persona. In the revival, he, Lloyd, and Kevin work together in a scientific firm and collectively raise a "son", named Hubert.
- Flora Mayesh, played by Kristin Quick (15 episodes), is one of Malcolm's other "Krelboyne" classmates. As a background character, Flora rarely speaks and is uncredited for 12 of her appearances.
- "Eraserhead" (real name: Kyle), played by Will Jennings (12 episodes), is one of Malcolm's "Krelboyne" classmates who recurs throughout seasons 1 and 2 of the series.
- Kevin, played by Victor Z. Isaac (6 episodes), is one of Malcolm's "Krelboyne" classmates who recurs throughout seasons 3 and 4 of the series, serving as a replacement for Eraserhead after Will Jennings left the show. In the revival, he, Dabney, and Lloyd work together in a scientific firm and collectively raise a "son", named Hubert.

=== Family members ===
- Victor and Ida Welker, played by Robert Loggia (1 episode) and Cloris Leachman (11 episodes) respectively, are Lois' parents of indeterminate Eastern European origin, although possibly Croatian. Victor dies some time before the events of the season three episode "Christmas", in which Ida is widowed. Ida harbors a strong dislike for both Francis and Lois, evident by the way she treats them. She favors Reese, which allows him to love her. Ida belittles Malcolm for being weak in not standing up to his mother and largely ignores Dewey, although she saves him from being hit by a car, causing her to lose a leg. Ida harbors resentment towards Victor's secret other family for stealing what was rightfully hers, until Lois discovers near the end of the fifth season that she is not blood-related to Victor (and possibly Susan as well) and abandons Ida. Ida had a sister, Helen, whose funeral is featured in the first season. In the revival series, Ida is revealed to have died and her own funeral is featured as Leachman had passed away in 2021.
- Susan Welker, played by Laurie Metcalf (1 episode), is Lois' younger sister who is often mentioned throughout the series and makes her first appearance in the episode "Lois' Sister" of season 5. Susan is regarded as more talented, popular, and successful, as well as the family favorite. Susan dated Hal before Lois did and blames her sister for stealing him, leading to their rivalry. When Lois learns she is in kidney failure, she decides to donate one of her kidneys to save her life, which Susan rejects until Lois persuades her otherwise. Susan is briefly mentioned in seasons 6 and 7, but not seen again.
- Raduca, played by Rheagan Wallace (2 episodes), is Reese's wife during season 7, chosen by Ida. During their short-lived marriage, Raduca has an affair with another man throughout, as she had been using Reese to get a green card. She is indirectly mentioned in the revival, when Reese recounts his failed marriages to Hal as they're making repairs in the bathroom.
  - Wallace previously played a different character named Jackie in the season 3 episode "Reese Drives" before playing Raduca.
- Walter, played by Christopher Lloyd (1 episode), is Hal's wealthy father and a retired military veteran, who along with his unseen wife Sharon wanted Hal to marry a wealthy woman rather than Lois. He has a habit of not listening to Hal voicing his problems from childhood to the present because he isn't sure how to deal with them, as his other children did not experience the same problems growing up. Walter takes a liking to Malcolm more than his other grandsons because of their shared love of history, and he is particularly passionate about the American Civil War. He dies offscreen in the season 7 episode "Hal Grieves."
- Amelia and Claire, played by Brenda Strong and Jeannine Jackson respectively (1 episode), are Hal's older sisters, who dislike Lois and swap passive-aggressive comments with her. Despite her similar poor background, it was implied that Amelia and Claire liked Susan more than Lois.
- Enoch Tananahaakna, played by Steeve Reevis (1 episode), is Piama's estranged father and father-in-law to Francis. He makes his first and only appearance in the season 3 episode "Poker #2" after having been mentioned several times.

=== Friends and neighbors ===
- Craig Feldspar, portrayed by David Anthony Higgins (41 episodes), is Lois' cowardly, somewhat childish co-worker at the Lucky Aide, who is promoted to assistant manager early on. He is a hopeless romantic, and has unrequited feelings for Lois. He plays the ukulele and the banjo, and he sings in a countertenor voice. He is also very knowledgeable about home entertainment systems, computers and old TV shows. By the end of the series, Craig becomes Reese's roommate. In the revival, Craig is still single, but maintains a closeness to Malcolm's family. He also no longer works at the Lucky Aide and now works at Huge Mart. It is implied that he himself burned down the Lucky Aide after being denied a promotion.
- Malik, Trey, Brian, and Steve, played by Dan Martin, Alex Morris, Edward James Gage, and Jonathan Craig Williams, respectively (9 episodes), are Hal and Abe's poker buddies and fellow stage bandmates. Some of the humor involving them centers on Hal being the only European-American member of the otherwise black group.
  - John Marshall Jones (2 episodes) portrays Brian in the revival. He previously played a different character, a Cop, in the season 5 episode "Christmas Trees".
- Jessica, played by Hayden Panettiere (4 episodes), is a manipulative neighbor of the family and a classmate of Malcolm and Reese's. Though she does not appear in the revival, she is referenced in episode one, when a poster in Leah's school shows that she became a French teacher in Harvard.
- Ed, played by Paul Willson (4 episodes), is one of the many neighbors who despises Hal and Lois, along with Reese. He has shown some favoritism towards Malcolm for helping him set up his new computer.
- Polly, played by Julie Hagerty (4 episodes), is Jamie's slightly insane hippie babysitter. She does not physically appear in the revival but is referenced in a tear-off poster in a tattoo parlor, showing that Polly is offering free babysitting.
- Karen, played by Amy Farrington (2 episodes), is Lois' alcoholic and airheaded friend from the book club.
- Doreen Hooper, played by Beth Grant (2 episodes), is Dabney’s overbearing and manipulative mother.
- Cynthia’s Father, played by Fred Sanders (2 episodes), is her stern father with a strong dislike towards Malcolm.
- Boyd, played by Michael Shamus Wiles (2 episodes), is Nikki's father who forbids Malcolm from seeing her, causing them to date in secret.

=== Marlin Academy ===
- Commandant Edwin Spangler, played by Daniel von Bargen (16 episodes), is the military veteran in charge of the cadets at Marlin Academy. A retired United States Air Force general who has never experienced frontline combat, he has a contentious relationship with the rebellious Francis throughout his entire stay at the academy, although the two sometimes show a deep sympathy for the other's emotional scarring from family. He wears an eye patch and has a hook for a hand, although it is never fully explained why. Before Francis leaves Marlin Academy, Spangler tells Francis that bullying him rejuvenated him and he would have retired without him, then gives him a ceremonial sword as thanks, which Francis accidentally cuts off Spangler's remaining hand with. Later in the third season, Spangler tracks Francis to Alaska, having been fired and sued for drinking on the job, and feeling depressed with no one to turn to. Francis gets him a job at the Snow Haven Retirement Home, where he has free rein to bully the elderly. Sometime between the original finale and the revival, Spangler passes away, much to the joy of his former cadets.
- Cadet Eric Hanson, played by Eric Nenninger (28 episodes), one of Francis' friends and classmates from Marlin Academy. Francis accompanies Eric in his plan to abandon the academy to find well-paying labor work in Alaska. At the end of season three, Eric is seen for the final time being left by Francis to hitchhike home. In the revival, Eric still maintains a close friendship with Drew and Ken as they continue to waste away pulling pranks, much to Francis's confusion.
- Cadet Drew Horton, played by Drew Powell (12 episodes) is physically the strongest cadet at Marlin Academy, but is emotionally weak. In the revival, Drew still maintains a close friendship with Eric and Ken as they continue to waste away pulling pranks, much Francis's confusion.
- Cadet Stanley Winn, played by Karim Prince (8 episodes) is Francis' friend and informal bodyguard during the first season.
- Cadet Ken Finley, played by Arjay Smith (10 episodes) is a friend of Francis during seasons 1 and 2. He is reputed to have good grades and was hazed once from a cult group. In the revival, Ken still maintains a close friendship with Drew and Eric as they continue to waste away pulling pranks, much Francis's confusion.
- Cadet Joe, played by Kasan Butcher (12 episodes) is another cadet who threatens Francis in one episode.
- Cadet Jose, played by José Espinoza (2 episodes) is a cadet at Marlin Academy.
- Cadet Adam, played by Adam Hendershott (2 episodes) is a cadet at Marlin Academy.

=== Alaska ===
- Lavernia, played by Brenda Wehle (7 episodes), is Francis and Eric's malevolent boss who owns the logging site in Alaska. She has a debt book and presumably knows every dark secret about her workers. Lavernia develops a personal grudge towards Piama after she blackmails her to be nice to Francis by holding her pet parakeet hostage. Lavernia is known to have sex toys in her lodging and which Francis is aware of.
- Pete, played by Sandy Ward (11 episodes) is a possibly insane, senile elderly coworker of Francis at the Alaskan lodge.
- Artie, played by John Ennis (9 episodes) is an overweight, uneducated, color blind, and dyslexic coworker of Francis at the Alaskan lodge.
- Dave, played by Richard Gross (5 episodes) is a frequent customer at Lavernia’s lodge.
- Ivan, played by Ivan Naranjo (3 episodes) is a Native American man who frequently locks horns with Francis and Piama, such as taking back the totem pole that Francis had kept after retrieving it from his logging buddies and getting offended by his cultural ignorance, being cheated out of blackjack by Francis, and getting him and Piama evicted from their cabin.

=== The Grotto ===
- Otto Mankusser, played by Kenneth Mars (25 episodes), is Francis' friendly and cheerful boss at the dude ranch, albeit a bit naïve at times. He has a habit of hiring too many people in both his personal and professional life. Originally from Germany, he and his wife Gretchen, played by Meagen Fay, (12 episodes) own the ranch, which is known as the Grotto, a combination of their first names. In the revival, Otto is revealed to have passed away from a puma attack, though Gretchen claims it was quick and thus he did not suffer. Gretchen herself is now a traveling doula for cows and is able to detect that Piama is pregnant.

=== Other classmates and faculty ===
- Richie, played by Todd Giebenhain (8 episodes), is Francis' dim-witted best friend before being sent to military school. In the revival, he now runs a microdosing facility.
- Circus and Justin, played by Parker Mills and Justin Pierce (2 episodes), are Francis' hoodlum friends.
- Donnie, played by Nick Wechsler (1 episode), is a delinquent friend of Francis who takes over the family’s house to build a meth lab in the season 4 episode "Reese’s Party". He was created as a replacement for Richie as Todd Giebenhain was unavailable to reprise his role for said episode.
- Julie Houlerman, played by Landry Allbright (3 episodes) is a girl whom Malcolm had a short-lived crush on in the first season.
- Alison, played by Brittany Renee Finamore (5 episodes) is Reese's girlfriend during season 4. She originally dated Malcolm, but broke up with him.
- Nikki, played by Reagan Dale Neis (4 episodes) is Malcolm's girlfriend during season 4.
  - Neis previously played a different character named Laura, Eric Hanson's one-off girlfriend, in the season 2 episode "Evacuation".
- Ira Prescott, played by Jonny Acker (3 episodes), is a student of North High School. He is Reese's bully. Ira debuts in "Forbidden Girlfriend" in which he owns a car which Reese ruins by using Dewey in pouring cement in it and letting Billy Prescott take the blame for the prank. Wearing a disguise, Reese identifies Dewey as Billy Prescott and even shouts out Prescott's address. The police then bring Billy to Ira, who at first accuses him of destroying the car. With Dewey's help, Ira gets his revenge on Reese for his prank and using Billy by simply beating him up. He returns briefly in Season 5's "Malcolm Films Reese" and is among the students in humiliation and in "Reese's Apartment" when Malcolm is tutoring Ira and help get him a passing grade in his classes so he can keep his spot on the North High School football team. Unlike Reese, Ira has more respect for Malcolm.
- Chad, played by Cameron Monaghan (6 episodes) is a student in Dewey's special class. He is prominently featured in the episode "Chad's Sleepover".
- David Hanson, played by Danny McCarty Jr. (5 episodes) is a student in Dewey's special class. He runs for class president with a colorful campaign speech.
- Zoe, played by Amy Bruckner (3 episodes) is a student in Dewey's special class.
- Penelope, played by Jennette McCurdy (1 episode) is a student in Dewey's special class. She was created to replace Zoe after Amy Bruckner left the show due to scheduling issues.
  - McCurdy had previously played Daisy, Dewey's female counterpart in Lois's fantasy, in the season 4 episode "If Boys Were Girls".
- Mr. Hodges, played by Steve Vinovich (3 episodes in season 7) is Malcolm & Reese's school principal during their senior year.
- Mrs. Welsh, played by Tricia O'Kelley (2 episodes) is a guidance counselor at Dewey’s school.
- Coach Oleski, played by Jack McGee (2 episodes) is Malcolm’s sarcastic and harsh gym teacher at his high school.
- Barton, played by Will Stebile (episode 9 in season 3) is the only classmate introduced who is smarter than Malcolm. He is said to have an IQ of 280, although such a score is virtually impossible.

=== Lucky Aide staff ===
- Margie, played by Rose Abdoo (2 episodes), is Lois's chatterbox and gossipy drunk co-worker at the Lucky Aide.
- Dolores, played by Patricia Place (1 episode) is an employee at the Lucky Aide.
  - Patricia Place previously played a senile old neighbor of the family’s, Mrs. Jansen, in season 2 episode "Lois’s Birthday" though there’s no indication that they’re supposed to be the same character.

== Guest stars ==
- Bea Arthur guest stars as Dewey's babysitter Mrs. White in the season 1 episode "Water Park (Part 1)"
- Octavia Spencer guest stars as a Cashier named Jackie in season 2 episode "High School Play"
- Dakota Fanning guest stars as Emily, a bratty neighbor who bites Reese, in the season 2 episode "New Neighbors"
- Hallee Hirsh guest stars as Malcolm's friend Jessica (no relation to the Hayden Panettiere character) in the season 2 episode "Traffic Jam (Part 2)"
- Christina Ricci guest stars as Kelly, a co-worker of Hal’s, in the season 3 episode "Company Picnic: Part 1"
- Susan Sarandon guest stars as Meg, a neurotic and talkative acquaintance of Hal and Lois in the two-part episodes "Company Picnic: Parts 1 and 2"
- Jason Alexander guest stars as Leonard, a chess-playing bum Malcolm befriends at the park, in season 4 episode "Future Malcolm"
- David Cassidy guest stars as Boone Vincent, a singer Lois is obsessed with, in the season 5 episode "Vegas"
- Sara Paxton guest stars as Angela Pozefsky, a girl Malcolm briefly dates, in the season 5 episode "Malcolm Dates a Family"
- Kurtwood Smith guest stars as Principal Block in the season 5 episode "Dirty Magazine"
- Betty White guest stars as Sylvia, Victor's secret lover, in the season 5 episode "Victor's Other Family"
- James Hong guest stars as Mr. Li, Ida's boyfriend whom she drugged to marry her, in season 5 episode "Ida’s Boyfriend"
- Kathryn Joosten guest stars as Claire, Jamie's new babysitter who annoys Lois to no end, in the season 7 episode "Malcolm Defends Reese"
- George Takei guest stars as Himself in the season 7 episode "Hal Grieves"
- Emma Stone guest stars as Diane, a girl who plays a vicious prank on Reese, in the season 7 episode "Lois Strikes Back"

=== Girl versions of the boys ===
- Mallory, played by Lisa Foiles (episode 10 in season 4)
- Renee, played by Mimi Paley (episode 10 in season 4)
- Daisy, played by Jennette McCurdy (episode 10 in season 4)
