= Gail Berman =

American producer and television executive

- Born: August 17, 1956 (age 70); Brooklyn, New York, U.S.
- Education: University of Maryland
- Occupation: Media executive
- Spouse: Bill Masters
- Children: 2

Gail Berman (born August 17, 1956) is an American producer and television executive. She is co-owner and founding partner of The Jackal Group, a production entity formed in partnership with Fox Networks Group. The Jackal Group develops and produces scripted, unscripted, and 'factual' entertainment programming for FNG's channels, including Fox Broadcasting Company, FX/FXX, the National Geographic Channels, and Fox International Channels. The partnership also provides for opportunities in digital and film, as well as for non-21st Century Fox distribution entities.

== Early life ==
Berman was born to a Jewish family in Brooklyn. The family soon moved to Bellmore, New York, where she was raised. In 1974, she graduated from Abington Senior High School and in 1978, she graduated with a B.A. in theater from the University of Maryland.

== Career ==
Berman graduated from the University of Maryland, where she served on the board of trustees. Berman also serves on the board of directors of the Center Theatre Group, a non-profit company that oversees the Ahmanson Theatre, the Mark Taper Forum and the Kirk Douglas Theatre. Berman is married to sitcom writer Bill Masters and they have two children.

Berman began her career as a theater producer after graduating with a bachelor's degree in theater from the University of Maryland. At 23, she and her college friend Susan Rose co-produced their first Broadway show, the original Broadway production of Joseph and the Amazing Technicolor Dreamcoat, which went on to garner seven Tony Award nominations. Berman's other Broadway productions include Hurlyburly by David Rabe (1984), Athol Fugard's Blood Knot (1985), and The Nerd by Larry Shue (1987), all of which received Tony Award nominations.

Berman served as president and CEO of production company Sandollar Television. During her six years with Sandollar, Berman also served as executive producer on the primetime series All American Girl starring Margaret Cho. During this time, Berman criticized Cho's appearance, spurring Cho to lose weight rapidly enough to experience acute kidney failure.

Berman next served as founding president of Regency Television, the TV studio created in 1998 as a co-venture between Fox Television Studios and New Regency Productions. Under Berman, Regency Television's programs included Malcolm in the Middle and The Bernie Mac Show.

Then, Berman served from 2000 to 2005 as president of Entertainment for Fox Broadcasting Company. At Fox, Berman was in charge of all program development and scheduling as well as marketing, business affairs, and promotions. Network shows under Berman's tenure included American Idol, The Simple Life, Hell's Kitchen, Nanny 911, 24, The Bernie Mac Show (in which she also produced for Regency TV), The War at Home, House, Arrested Development, Bones, Prison Break, The O.C, Firefly, and both Seth MacFarlane's American Dad! and Family Guy (the latter was originally launched under Doug Herzog's watch, but became an overnight success during Berman's era). Despite originally commissioning the series, Berman is best remembered now for cancelling Firefly following decisions to place it in the “Friday night death slot” and air the episodes out of order.

Berman served as executive producer on both Buffy the Vampire Slayer and its spin-off Angel, and was reported to be involved with the sequel of Buffy being developed.

Berman became president of Paramount Pictures in March 2005 and was responsible for the studio's annual slate of films, including the acquisition of literary properties, development, budgeting, casting, and the production of motion pictures for Paramount Pictures, MTV Films and Nickelodeon Movies. She left Paramount in January 2007.

Prior to founding The Jackal Group in 2014, Berman spent seven years as the co-founder and co-owner of the media company BermanBraun with Lloyd Braun, which was an innovator in the digital arena, creating and operating successful online brands. The company's properties have included reality and scripted programs as well as live-action and animated projects; the most notable program that was produced by the company would be the game show Duel, which aired on ABC between December 2007 and July 2008. In February 2014, Braun became the sole owner of BermanBraun, renaming the company Whalerock Industries.

Before BermanBraun, Berman was the first and only female executive to hold the top posts at both a major film studio and television network.

In June 2018, she was named co-president of the Producers Guild of America, alongside Lucy Fisher.

In 2019, Fox Corporation and Berman's Jackal Group announced their partnership on a new production venture called SideCar, described as a content development accelerator. Fox will be the sole owner of all series that originate under the SideCar banner. The accelerator's development slate includes Mr. Black, the animated comedy Saloon, and the drama The Perfect Couple. In October 2020, Berman signed on to executive produce the streaming series Wednesday.

Business positions
Preceded by Doug Herzog	President of FOX; 2000-2005	Succeeded by Peter Liguori
