= Graduation (Malcolm in the Middle) =

- Malcolm in the Middle episode
- Episode no.: Season 7 Episode 22
- Directed by: Linwood Boomer
- Written by: Michael Glouberman
- Cinematography by: Michael Weaver; Michael Budge
- Editing by: Nancy Morrison
- Original release date: May 14, 2006
- Running time: 23 minutes

Guest appearances
- Cloris Leachman as Grandma Ida; Linwood Boomer as Loan shark; Lamont Thompson as Cedric Hampton

Episode chronology
← Previous "Morp"	Next → —
- Malcolm in the Middle season 7

"Graduation" is the series finale of the American comedy series Malcolm in the Middle. It is the 22nd episode of the seventh season, and the 151st episode overall. Written by Michael Glouberman and directed by Linwood Boomer, the episode first aired on Fox on May 14, 2006. In this episode, Malcolm faces a tough choice between Harvard and a dream job while struggling to craft his valedictorian speech. Hal turns to organized crime to gather funds for Malcolm's college tuition. Reese moves in with Craig and takes up a janitorial job, leading to chaos as the boys try to cover up past misdeeds. As Malcolm uncovers Lois's aspirations for his presidency, he reconciles with her during his speech. In the aftermath, Reese and Craig bond, Dewey and Jamie continue their mischief, Francis keeps his job secret, and Hal and Lois confront a surprise pregnancy. Malcolm heads to Harvard, working as a janitor to support his education.

According to Nielsen Media Research, the episode was watched by 7.38 million viewers during its original American broadcast. The episode received praise from critics.

== Plot ==
In the cold opening, all the boys sit on the couch watching something when Reese returns with a bowl of popcorn asking what he missed. Lois tells Hal to call a repairman but he refuses claiming he can fix the television himself revealing the boys are actually entertained by watching their father's attempts to fix the television. Hal gets shocked making the boys laugh while Lois sighs in annoyance.

As Malcolm struggles with writing his valedictorian speech and must decide between going to Harvard and accepting a dream job, Hal consults with organized crime to raise the last $5,000 he needs to send Malcolm to college. Meanwhile, Reese moves in with Craig and becomes an assistant janitor at the high school, and the boys destroy the evidence of their faking an X-ray of Lois having cancer to distract her from their bad report cards from years ago. Malcolm discovers that Lois has been pushing him to become President of the United States his whole life after Reese's plan to create the worst mess ever backfires. Nevertheless, Malcolm finally reconciles with Lois as he makes his speech. Three months after the end, Reese and Craig become best friends and roommates, and Reese keeps his job as a janitor after he frames his boss for installing peepholes in the girls' bathroom; Dewey and Jamie continue their brothers' tradition of causing household mischief; Francis enjoys life with a stable job, one that he has never told Lois about; Hal and Lois panic when Lois discovers she is pregnant again; and Malcolm attends Harvard, working part time as a janitor to pay his way through college.

== Production ==
"Graduation" was written by Michael Glouberman in his twenty-second and final writing credit for the series, and was directed by Malcolm in the Middle creator Linwood Boomer. Glouberman later received writing credits on April 11, 2006. Boomer also makes a cameo appearance as a loan shark. Cloris Leachman appears in a recurring role as Grandma Ida.

== Release and reception ==
"Graduation" was first broadcast on May 14, 2006, on the Fox Network at 8:30p.m. Eastern Standard Time in the United States. The original airing attracted 7.38 million live viewers. It was the most watched episode of the season, following "Lois Strikes Back", which previously aired on March 19, and was watched by 4.94 million people. After the episode aired various props from the show were auctioned on eBay.

Writing for Comic Book Resources, Brenton Stewart felt that the episode was a perfect ending for the series. Bernard Herrera, a content writer for MovieWeb, said it was "the best episode of the entire show". Writing for Screen Rant Amanda Bruce and Stephen Barker ranked the episode fourth best of the series overall.
