= Linwood Boomer =

Canadian-American television producer, writer, and actor (born 1955)

- Born: October 9, 1955 (age 71); Vancouver, British Columbia, Canada
- Occupations: Writer; producer; director; actor
- Years active: 1978–present
- Spouse: Tracy Katsky
- Children: 4

Linwood M. Boomer (born October 9, 1955) is a Canadian-American film and television producer, writer, and actor. He is known for playing the role of Adam Kendall on the television drama Little House on the Prairie (1978–1981), and for creating the Fox sitcom Malcolm in the Middle (2000–2006), as well as its revival series, Life's Still Unfair (2026).

== Early life ==
Boomer was born into a lower-middle-class family in Vancouver, British Columbia, Canada, the third of four sons. He grew up in San Mateo, California, and attended Highlands Elementary School and Junípero Serra High School before moving to Aragon High School, from which he graduated in 1974. He was enrolled in a gifted program at school. Boomer created Malcolm in the Middle, based on his own life story, which aired on Fox from January 2000 to May 2006.

== Career ==
Boomer began his career as an actor. After playing Adam Kendall on Little House on the Prairie, Boomer began working behind the camera in the television business.

Boomer's writing and executive producing credits include Night Court, Flying Blind, The Boys Are Back, Townies, 3rd Rock from the Sun and God, the Devil and Bob. He also created and executive produced the pilots Family Business, Nice Try, and the American version of Red Dwarf and served as an executive producer under James L. Brooks for the pilot of Big. He owns his own production company Satin City.

Boomer negotiated with CBS on a pilot order for a project that reunited him with Gail Berman, the exec who shepherded Malcolm during her tenure at Regency TV and as programming chief at Fox. Boomer wrote the script and exec produced along with Berman and Lloyd Braun for their BermanBraun shingle and Universal Media Studios, where BermanBraun is based. Dubbed The Karenskys, the multi-camera comedy would revolve around a daughter's return to the fold of her large, eccentric, ethnic family after her husband takes a job in her hometown. It was directed by Pamela Fryman and starred Annie Potts, Desi Lydic, Jack Thompson, Mather Zickel, Sasha Alexander, Tinsley Grimes, and Todd Stashwick.

=== Malcolm in the Middle ===
Boomer based the Fox sitcom Malcolm in the Middle on his life story. The pilot episode of the series premiered on January 9, 2000, and was watched by 22.5 million viewers, while the second episode, "Red Dress" (premiered on January 16, 2000), was watched by 26 million viewers. Boomer wrote two episodes, starting with the pilot episode and then "Francis Escapes" and directed five episodes: "Opera", "Stilts", "Reese vs. Stevie", "Bride of Ida" and the series finale, "Graduation".

Boomer received a Primetime Emmy Award for Outstanding Writing for a Comedy Series for the pilot episode. The series completed its six-year run on May 14, 2006, after seven seasons and 151 episodes.

In April 2026, a four-episode continuing miniseries of the show, Malcolm in the Middle: Life's Still Unfair, also created by Boomer, was released on Hulu.

== Awards and nominations ==
=== Wins ===
- Primetime Emmy Award for Outstanding Writing for a Comedy Series for Malcolm in the Middle ("Pilot")

=== Nominations ===
- Primetime Emmy Awards for Outstanding Comedy Series for Malcolm in the Middle (2001)
- Primetime Emmy Awards for Primetime Emmy Award for Outstanding Comedy Series for Night Court (1984)

== Filmography (as an actor) ==
Year	Title	Role	Notes
1978	Suddenly, Love	Dave Busby	TV movie
1980	Hawaii Five-O	Nick Zano	Episode: "The Flight of the Jewels"
1978–1981	Little House on the Prairie	Adam Kendall	35 episodes
1982	The Love Boat	Doug Bridges	Episode: "The Return of the Captain's Lady/Love Ain't Illegal/The Irresistible Man"
1983	Fantasy Island	Alex Weston	Episode: "Eternal Flame/A Date with Burt"
1983	Voyagers!	Dr. Thomas A. Watson	Episode: "Barriers of Sound"
1985	The Young and the Restless	Jared Markson	Episode dated April 8, 1985
2006	Malcolm in the Middle	Loan Shark (as Enzo Stussi)	Episode: "Graduation"
2018	Santa Clarita Diet	Mr. Whetherton	Episode: "The Queen of England"
2026	Malcolm in the Middle: Life's Still Unfair	Unknown	Episode: "Episode 4"
