= Doug Herzog =

American television executive (born 1959)

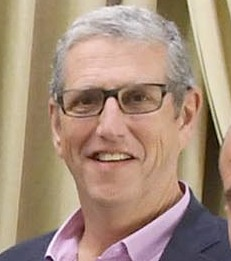
- Herzog in 2017
- Born: Douglas Alan Herzog; July 16, 1959 (age 67); Paterson, New Jersey, U.S.
- Education: Emerson College (BS)
- Occupation: Businessman
- Title: Former President of Viacom Music and Entertainment Group
- Awards: Broadcasting and Cable Hall of Fame

Doug Herzog (born July 16, 1959) is an American television executive. He was formerly the president of Viacom Music and Entertainment Group, he oversaw MTV, VH1, Logo TV, Comedy Central, Palladia, TV Land and Spike. Herzog has been credited with evolving the MTV brand by steering the network away from music related programming.

Herzog is on the board of jurors for the Peabody Awards.

== Career ==
Herzog received his B.S. degree in Mass Communications from Emerson College in 1981. He started a reggae show at the college radio station in 1978, and it ended up becoming the most popular show on the station, ultimately running every day for 35 years.

He moved to Los Angeles to work at CNN when it was created in 1981, and became a segment producer at Entertainment Tonight in 1983.

Herzog's Viacom career began in 1984 when he joined MTV. Herzog started as MTV News Director, creating the networks influential news department and eventually rising to President MTV Productions overseeing all the channel's original programming. Herzog developed and supervised many of the brands most enduring and groundbreaking franchises including The Real World, Unplugged and Road Rules, as well as the network's signature events The MTV Movie Awards and The MTV Video Music Awards.

Herzog launched shows such as The Daily Show with Jon Stewart, The Colbert Report, South Park, The Real World, UFC, Key & Peele, Inside Amy Schumer, Hot in Cleveland, Workaholics, Tosh.0, and Younger.

In 1993, he was named president of the MTV Productions unit.

Herzog then moved to the position of President of Comedy Central in 1995.

Herzog left Viacom to work as President of USA Network igniting the network's original programming with the award-winning Monk. Herzog also served as President of Entertainment for FOX Broadcasting Company where he green-lit the Emmy Award-winning Malcolm in the Middle and three animated sitcoms The PJs, Family Guy and Futurama

Herzog returned to Viacom in 2004 as the President of Viacom's Music Entertainment Group where he oversaw Comedy Central, MTV, VH1, Spike, TVLand and Logo. Herzog left the company in January 2017 after spending almost 27 years with the company.

In 2018, Herzog was hired as senior Creative Consultant for the Quibi Streaming Service. The service has since shut down due to lack of viewership.

In 2022, Herzog launched a podcast about the history of basic cable television programming in America.

== Awards ==
Herzog has been inducted into the Broadcasting and Cable Hall of Fame.

Business positions
Preceded by Robert Kreek	President of Comedy Central; 1995-1998	Succeeded by Larry Divney
Preceded by Peter Roth	President of FOX; 1998-2000	Succeeded by Gail Berman
