= Malcolm in the Middle =

American television sitcom (2000–2006)

- Genre: Sitcom; Black comedy; Cringe comedy; Slapstick; Coming of age
- Created by: Linwood Boomer
- Showrunners: Linwood Boomer (seasons 1–6); Matthew Carlson (season 7)
- Starring: Jane Kaczmarek; Bryan Cranston; Christopher Masterson; Justin Berfield; Erik Per Sullivan; Catherine Lloyd Burns; Frankie Muniz
- Theme music composer: John Flansburgh; John Linnell
- Opening theme: "Boss of Me" by They Might Be Giants
- Ending theme: "Boss of Me" (instrumental)
- Composers: Charles Sydnor; They Might Be Giants
- Country of origin: United States
- Original language: English
- No. of seasons: 7
- No. of episodes: 151 (list of episodes)

Production
- Executive producers: Linwood Boomer (seasons 1–6); Matthew Carlson (season 7); Alex Reid (season 7) (Note: Only credited in this role on the last seven episodes of the season.)
- Producers: Gordon Wolf (pilot); Jimmy Simons
- Camera setup: Panavision; single-camera
- Running time: 21–30 minutes
- Production companies: Satin City Productions; Regency Television; Fox Television Studios (Note: The Fox Television Studios logo is replaced with the 20th Century Fox Television logo on current high-definition prints of seasons 1 to 5.)

Original release
- Network: Fox
- Release: January 9, 2000 – May 14, 2006

Related
- Malcolm in the Middle: Life's Still Unfair

Malcolm in the Middle is an American television sitcom created by Linwood Boomer for the Fox Broadcasting Company. The series premiered on January 9, 2000, and ended on May 14, 2006, after seven seasons consisting of 151 episodes.

The single-camera series is a comedy that follows a dysfunctional working-class family and stars Frankie Muniz in the lead role as Malcolm, a child prodigy. The ensemble cast includes Bryan Cranston and Jane Kaczmarek as Malcolm's parents, Hal and Lois. Christopher Kennedy Masterson, Justin Berfield, and Erik Per Sullivan appear as Malcolm's brothers, Francis, Reese, and Dewey, respectively. Typical plots revolve around the family's dysfunctional relationships and inability to fit into society, with Malcolm regularly making asides to the camera to comment on their failures. Another brother, Jamie (James and Lukas Rodriguez), was introduced as the fifth son of Hal and Lois at the end of season four, with a further pregnancy in the series finale alluding to a sixth child.

Malcolm in the Middle was produced by Satin City and Regency Television in association with Fox Television Studios. The show has been syndicated worldwide, and received widespread critical acclaim and proved a popular draw for Fox. It is placed on several lists of the greatest TV and sitcom series of all time. It has won a Peabody Award, seven Emmy Awards, one Grammy Award and seven Golden Globe nominations. The show was influential as one of the first single-camera comedy series on TV without a live studio audience or laugh track.

A four-episode revival Malcolm in the Middle: Life's Still Unfair was released on Hulu in April 2026, with Caleb Ellsworth-Clark replacing Sullivan as Dewey and Anthony Timpano replacing the Rodriguez twins as a now grown Jamie. The revival was well received by critics and reached 8.1 million views in three days.

== Premise ==
The series follows Malcolm (Frankie Muniz), who is revealed in the first episode to be a genius with an IQ of 165. He is placed in a class for gifted students, known as the "Krelboynes", initially taught by Caroline Miller (Catherine Lloyd Burns). Malcolm is the third-born child in a dysfunctional working-class family of four (later five) boys, headed by Hal (Bryan Cranston) and Lois (Jane Kaczmarek). At the start of the series, the eldest son, Francis (Christopher Masterson), has been sent to military school, while his younger brothers Reese (Justin Berfield) and Dewey (Erik Per Sullivan) remain at home. With Francis away, Malcolm becomes the middle child. In the fourth season, Jamie (James and Lukas Rodriguez) is introduced as the fifth son of Hal and Lois. The early seasons focus on Malcolm's struggles with the demands of being intellectually gifted and the challenges of his chaotic family life.

Later seasons expanded the show's scope by exploring the family's interactions with their extended family, friends and colleagues in more depth, including Lois' tyrannical mother Ida (Cloris Leachman); Lois' hapless co-worker at the Lucky Aide drugstore Craig Feldspar (David Anthony Higgins); Malcolm's best friend Stevie Kenarban (Craig Lamar Traylor), who is both a wheelchair user and highly asthmatic; and Stevie's dad Abe (Gary Anthony Williams), as well as a series of continuing subplots detailing Francis' misadventures at the military academy, from which he subsequently disenrolls to work in an Alaskan logging camp, before finally landing a job on a dude ranch run by an eccentric German couple.

The series differed significantly from the standard TV sitcom presentation commonplace at the time. Malcolm routinely broke the fourth wall by both narrating in voice-over and talking directly to the viewer on camera. The distinctive look and sound of the series relied heavily on elaborate post-production, including fast-cut editing, sound effects, musical inserts, the extensive use of locations, and the unusual camera styles, compositions and effects (e.g. overhead, tracking, hand-held and crane shots, and the frequent use of a wide-angle lens for both close-ups and ensemble scenes) that would be generally impractical or impossible to achieve in a standard studio-based video multi-camera sitcom production. The show employed neither a laugh track (which was standard in other TV sitcoms) nor a live studio audience. Emulating the style of hour-long dramas, this half-hour show was shot on film instead of on video.

Another distinctive aspect of the show is that the cold open of nearly every episode is unrelated to the main story. Exceptions include episodes which were the conclusions of "two-parters"; each part two episode opened with a recap of its part one episode.

The family's surname is never mentioned directly in the series. Linwood Boomer's script for the pilot episode originally included the surname Wilkerson, but it was later removed because he did not want to put "any specific ethnic label on the characters". The surname appeared in early drafts of promotional material and also on Francis' Marlin Academy uniform in the pilot. In the last episode of the series, "Graduation", Francis drops his ID badge from his new office job, which lists his name as "Francis Nolastname". Also, in that same episode, the principal announces Malcolm as the speaker, mouthing "Nolastname" as his voice is drowned out by microphone feedback. A publicist for Fox said that "officially the family's last name should be considered a mystery".

== Characters ==
- Malcolm (played by Frankie Muniz) is the title character of the series. Malcolm is a genius with an IQ of 165 and a photographic memory. He is placed in a class for gifted students (or "Krelboynes" as they are known at the school). His high intelligence, as well as feelings of not fitting in, and a large ego fueled by a cruel streak of snarkiness cause numerous problems for him over the course of the series. As the title suggests, Malcolm is initially the middle child of the three living at home; chronologically, he is Hal and Lois' middle son. Despite his intelligence, Malcolm is just as immature and destructive as his brothers and is often the ringleader in their schemes. Throughout the show, Malcolm often strives for independence away from his controlling mother and often tries to have her see him as an equal. Due to his intelligence, Lois often makes decisions that she feels will benefit his education while keeping a close eye on him. It is revealed in the series finale that she does this so that he will one day become the President of the United States and use his position to help lower-class families like their own. His best friend is Stevie Kenarban. In the series finale, he graduates from high school and starts attending Harvard University by both scholarship and working various jobs, specifically as a janitor.
- Lois (played by Jane Kaczmarek) is the family's temperamental and overbearing mother who is also an intelligent and decisive woman. Most of her bullishness comes from her constant battles throughout the series to keep her badly behaved, highly destructive boys in check, while maintaining a menial job at a Lucky Aide drugstore, as well as her own difficult upbringing with a tyrannical mother and an indifferent father. Though she is hard on her children for their constantly bad behavior, Lois can be just as petty and spiteful as them, e.g., going after a group of girls that humiliated Reese before his senior prom. Despite her constant aggressiveness, she is motherly and will defend her family fiercely, especially against neighbors and others who view them as poor trash; in one episode, she finds that Malcolm and Reese discovered their neighbor having an affair with her Mexican gardener while they planned to frame her son for theft, but does not punish them for their actions as this counted as revenge against the woman, who despised Lois. Lois is disliked by both Hal's wealthy family and her own parents. She has a younger sister named Susan, who blames Lois for stealing Hal from her. Neighbors hate Lois and her sons and celebrate the weekends when they are gone. In the series finale, she discovered that she and Hal are expecting a sixth child.
- Hal (played by Bryan Cranston) is Lois' husband and father to Francis, Reese, Malcolm, Dewey and Jamie. Hal is a well-meaning, loving, but inept and completely immature father, and completely dependent on Lois, whom he loves absolutely. He comes from a wealthy family that does not accept Lois as his wife and who wish that he had married Susan instead. Because his family is disrespectful towards Lois, he rarely mentions them and avoids his family. Hal loves his boys and will sometimes sneak them out for fun father–son activities behind Lois' back. Hal is an indecisive character who frequently picks up new hobbies for short periods of time, such as speed walking or painting, and is irresponsible with the money he earns from his office job. His indecisiveness was explored in "Living Will" from a childhood which he had a hard time making decisions for himself and because of this, he always deferred to Lois to make them for him. In the series finale, he discovers that he and Lois are expecting a sixth child. Hal has a high sex drive, as revealed in the episode "Forbidden Girlfriend", and it is mentioned in the episode "Poker 2" that he has sex 14 times per week. Hal's best friend is Abe Kenarban.
- Francis (played by Christopher Kennedy Masterson) is Hal and Lois' oldest son. At the beginning of the series, he is attending military school in Alabama, run by the strict Commandant Spangler (Daniel von Bargen). It is shown that his parents enjoyed a promising middle-class, comfortable lifestyle before he was born and that he was such a difficult, destructive child that their dream soon ended. He has himself legally emancipated at the start of season three, leaves the school, and travels to Alaska. He finds work at a logging camp and later meets and marries Piama (Emy Coligado), a girl of Inuit heritage. When the camp closes, they move to the western United States and take jobs at a Wild West–themed hotel/ranch, run by kindly but eccentric Germans: Otto Mannkusser (played by Kenneth Mars) and his wife, Gretchen (played by Meagen Fay). Francis and his mother have a mutual love–hate war of wills, and his main motivation in life is to thwart or irk her (though, ironically, he marries a woman with the same personality as Lois). Although a juvenile delinquent, he is streetwise. Francis is seen less frequently after season five, becoming a recurring character and making only a small handful of appearances in season six and season seven, which is the show's final season. Francis' steady job disappears in season six due to legal issues until the series' finale, "Graduation", reveals that he has been working for a few months in a stable tech company job entering data into computers. He admits to Hal that he likes his job, but also enjoys frustrating Lois by lying to her that he's unemployed.
- Reese (played by Justin Berfield) is Hal and Lois' second son. The older brother of Malcolm, Dewey and Jamie, and younger brother of Francis, Reese is the most impulsive and physical of the boys. Lacking common sense, he is frequently outwitted and outspoken by other family members, and is gleefully violent. Despite being dimwitted, Reese is able to devise plans thoroughly (although most of his plans tend to backfire), and is masterful at the rare tasks which can pin his drifting focus, such as driving, or cooking and baking (he is revealed to be a culinary prodigy). In the series finale, he finally graduates from high school after intentionally failing many times before, obtains full employment as a high school custodian, and shares an apartment with Craig.
- Dewey (played by Erik Per Sullivan) is Hal and Lois' fourth son. He is the youngest child until the birth of Jamie, and often falls victim to his brothers' pranks. Starting in season 4, Dewey is shown to be very intelligent and musically gifted as he begins teaching himself to play the piano. He has a very high tolerance for pain due to years of physical and mental abuse from his brothers. Dewey often resorts to Machiavellian schemes to one-up his brothers and parents. Despite his intelligence, he is placed in a remedial class for slower students (or "Buseys") due to a misunderstanding. Dewey remains in the class and serves as their self-appointed teacher. By the seventh and final season of the show, the Busey class is no longer mentioned. He is the only sibling that eventually breaks the cycle of abusing the younger sibling, which ends up with him acting like a normal, lovable brother towards Jamie. In the series finale, he and Jamie are last seen hiding in the closet together after a prank, continuing their older brothers' tradition of incurring Lois' wrath.
- Caroline Miller (played by Catherine Lloyd Burns) is Malcolm's teacher (seasons 1–2).

== Episodes ==
Season	Episodes	Originally released	
Season	Episodes	First released	Last released
1	16	January 9, 2000	May 21, 2000
2	25	November 5, 2000	May 20, 2001
3	22	November 11, 2001	May 12, 2002
4	22	November 3, 2002	May 18, 2003
5	22	November 2, 2003	May 23, 2004
6	22	November 7, 2004	May 15, 2005
7	22	September 30, 2005	May 14, 2006

== Production ==
=== Development ===
The pilot's script was initially being developed by UPN until Regency Television became involved. It was planned for the 1998–99 television season. However, when UPN's enthusiasm for the project waned, Gail Berman managed to rescue the pilot by bringing the project to Fox. The show was then moved to the 1999–2000 cycle where it was picked up by Fox.

=== Opening title ===
The show's opening title features short clips from cult films or television shows, with earlier seasons being edited together with clips from the pilot and early episodes of the show. It was updated in season 4 to include clips from later seasons, set to the song "Boss of Me" by They Might Be Giants.

==== Making of the opening title ====
The Malcolm in the Middle title sequence was created by Emmy award winner Jeff Wunderlich of Wunderfilm Design, who is also responsible for other famous title sequences such as Friends and Scrubs. Showrunner and creator Linwood Boomer approached Wunderlich to collaborate on the title sequence for the pilot; after reading the script, Wunderlich was certain that the show would win an Emmy and was excited to work with Boomer.

A major issue was that Boomer had no show footage when he first approached Wunderlich; considering title sequences typically require background footage for visuals, Wunderlich suggested that he use cheap-to-license third-party clips to make up the gaps in the title sequence. Wunderlich said that he identified with Malcolm, and his childhood similarly consisted of getting beaten up by his older brothers all the time. However, when Boomer showed the title sequence to Fox executives, they stated it was far too violent. Needing to compromise, Boomer sent the show footage over and asked that Wunderlich weave the clips in between the show footage. As Wunderlich had been sourcing cheap VHS footage for the third party clips, the high quality 16mm series footage didn't edit into the clips cleanly. Wunderlich then copied the show footage to VHS tapes, played those tapes over his CRT TV in his living room, and manually panned and zoomed to create the title sequence.

In choosing the clips that ended up in the final edit, Wunderlich had to balance licensing fees with the theme of people getting beaten up and make the clips fit the theme of the name popping up. For example, when Jane Kaczmarek's (Lois) name appears, a monster erupts from the ocean. When Frankie Muniz's (Malcolm) name is shown, a giant brain is shown.

=== Filming ===
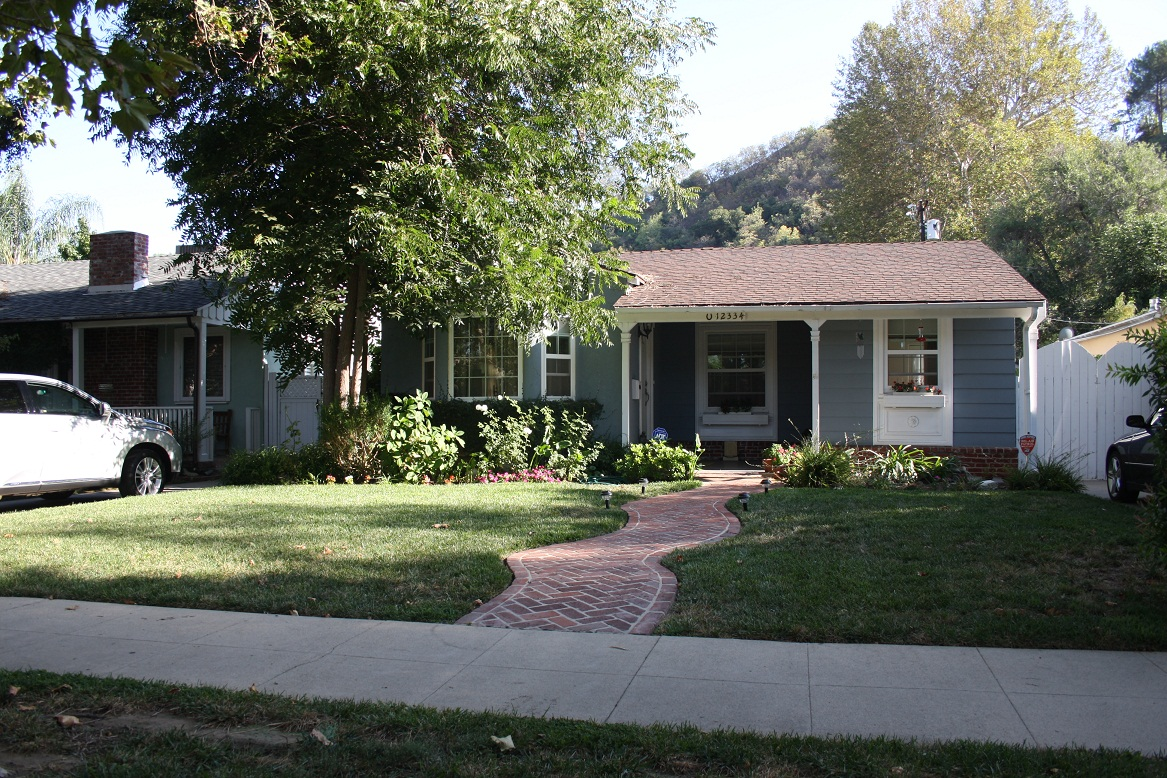
The house in Studio City as it appeared in 2009.

Much of the filming for Malcolm in the Middle was done on location in various parts of the thirty-mile zone around Los Angeles. A privately owned home, located in Studio City, California, was rented for upwards of $3,000 a day to film as the exterior of Malcolm's house. Rebuilt in 2011, the property is no longer recognizable due to its modern two-floor design. However, the house directly to the left of it is nearly identical to what it looked like during filming, still making it a frequent stop for fans of the show. Some high school scenes were filmed at Walter Reed Middle School, and the Lucky Aide was represented by a Drug Emporium at 6020 Lankershim Boulevard in North Hollywood. In "Stock Car Races", when Hal and the boys are entering a race track, the billboard behind the entrance displays the place as Irwindale Speedway, a real race track in Southern California. The last episode in the first season ("Water Park") was filmed at a water park called Wild Rivers located in Irvine, California. Though palm trees and desert scenery are seen in shots of the local region and town throughout the show, indicating a location in the Western United States, it is never revealed which state the show is set in (except for Francis' whereabouts in early seasons, such as his military school in Alabama and his job in Alaska. In Season 6 Episode 6 Hal's Christmas gift reveals a license plate showing it to be the "Cherokee state" or Oklahoma, during Lois' demo derby).

Studio filming for Malcolm in the Middle took place on Stage 21 at CBS Studio Center in Studio City, which included the interior of the home and the back yard. The middle school play yard was at the northern point of the CBS studio property at the end of Radford Avenue. It was redressed as the high school courtyard starting in season 4 and was demolished in 2006–2007.

Hallmarks of the series' filming and structure, many of which heavily influenced later programs, included the following:

- A cold open presenting one or more family members in an absurd situation that has little or nothing to do with the main plot of the episode.
- A split-second whip pan as a transition from one scene to another.
- Frequent pieces to camera delivered by Malcolm.
- An abrupt cut to black at the end of each segment, accompanied by the sound of a slamming door.

During the final two seasons, Christopher Masterson reduced his on-screen time in favor of writing and directing some episodes.

=== Music ===
The show's theme song, "Boss of Me", was written and recorded by the alternative rock group They Might Be Giants. The song won the "Best Song Written for a Motion Picture, Television or Other Visual Media" award at the 2002 Grammy Awards. The band also performed nearly all of the incidental music for the show in its first two seasons.

Mood-setting music is sprinkled throughout the series, in lieu of audience laughter, in a way that resembles feature film more than other TV sitcoms. Some examples of this highly varied music include ABBA, Basement Jaxx, Sum 41, Kenny Rogers, Lemon Jelly, Lords of Acid, the Getaway People, En Vogue, Electric Light Orchestra, Fatboy Slim, Phil Collins, Claude Debussy, Tears for Fears, Slade, Quiet Riot, Queen, and Citizen King, whose song "Better Days" is played at the end of both the pilot episode and the series finale. The Southern California pop-punk band Lit have many of their songs featured in several episodes. Lit songs that were never released as singles were also used.

A soundtrack, Music from Malcolm in the Middle, was released on November 21, 2000.

== Broadcast and syndication ==
The show entered barter syndication in the fall of 2004 seven months before the sixth season premiered on Fox, and it was later aired on FX from fall 2007 until fall 2011.

The show was launched on Nick at Nite on July 5, 2009, at 8:00 pm with an all night marathon. However, episodes were either skipped over or heavily edited due to content that was inappropriate for the network's standards. When Nick at Nite pulled Malcolm, it began airing on TeenNick from November 26, 2010, and continued until December 2010. The show returned to TeenNick's line-up on July 18, 2011.

On September 26, 2011, Malcolm in the Middle began airing on IFC. From March 5, 2018, to November 30, 2025, the series aired on Fuse.

On April 11, 2019, it was originally revealed that the show would be available on Disney+, Disney's direct-to-consumer streaming service, at launch on November 12, 2019. However, the show was not available on launch day for unknown reasons. In March 2020, during the COVID-19 pandemic, Disney sent a survey out to Disney+ consumers asking if they would like content on the site such as Malcolm in the Middle and other "mature" shows such as Firefly, Buffy the Vampire Slayer, and Modern Family. The series is currently available to watch on Hulu.

In the United Kingdom, the series originally aired on Sky1 from September 3, 2000, later also airing on Sky2 before finally leaving all Sky channels in December 2010. It also aired on free-to-air BBC Two from April 6, 2001, to March 7, 2009. From January 3, 2011, it aired on Fiver (now 5*) at 6:00 pm and again at about 7:30 pm, later moving to a weekly slot at 3:15 pm on Saturday afternoons. Repeats continued until January 18, 2014. Comedy Central UK and Ireland picked up the show in November 2015 and aired until 2018. Nickelodeon UK also began showing the series in 2018. 4Music started showing two episodes daily at 6.00 pm and 6.30 pm, from July 6, 2020. The show currently airs on E4 Extra. As of December 2021, the series is available on Disney+ in the UK.

In Kenya, the show used to air Thursdays at 7:30 pm on NTV from 2003 to 2005.

== Home media ==
Only the first season of Malcolm in the Middle has been released on DVD. In the U.S., season two was set to be released in the fall of 2003, but was cancelled due to high costs of music clearances.

Name	Format	Region 1	Region 2/B	Region 4	French release date	Ep #	# of discs	Extras and notes
The Complete First Season	DVD	October 29, 2002	September 24, 2012	September 4, 2013	March 4, 2014	16	3	Extended pilot episode, A Stroke of Genius featurette, commentary on select episodes, gag reel, deleted scenes, alternate show openings, bloopers, Dewey's Day Job featurette.
The Complete Second Season	DVD	N/A	November 19, 2012	September 4, 2013	April 8, 2014	25	4	Still Gallery
The Complete Third Season	DVD	N/A	February 4, 2013	September 4, 2013	N/A	22	3	A Still Gallery is listed but is absent from the actual DVDs
The Complete Fourth Season	DVD	N/A	March 4, 2013	September 4, 2013	N/A	22	3	A Still Gallery is listed but is absent from the actual DVDs
The Complete Fifth Season	DVD	N/A	April 29, 2013	September 4, 2013	N/A	22	3	
The Complete Sixth Season	DVD	N/A	May 27, 2013	September 4, 2013	N/A	22	3	
The Complete Seventh Season	DVD	N/A	October 7, 2013	September 4, 2013	N/A	22	3	
The Complete Collection Box Set	DVD	N/A	October 17, 2013	September 4, 2013	N/A	151	22	Extended pilot episode, A Stroke of Genius featurette, commentary on select episodes, gag reel, deleted scenes, alternate show openings, bloopers, Dewey's Day Job featurette, Season 2 Still Gallery.
The Complete Series	SD on Blu-ray	N/A	September 13, 2019	N/A	N/A	151	5	Extended pilot episode, A Stroke of Genius featurette, commentary on select episodes, gag reel, deleted scenes, alternate show openings, bloopers, Dewey's Day Job featurette, Season 2 Still Gallery.

In February 2012, it was announced that Fabulous Films would be releasing the first season of the show in the UK in April, as well as releasing each subsequent season the following month, ending with a complete series set near Christmas 2012. However, in late March 2012, several retailers had removed the release date from their websites; this was later revealed to be because of "technical issues with the Masters" and that the release date had been pushed back to June. Other seasons will now follow on either a monthly or bi-monthly basis.

All the UK DVD releases are intact as originally aired with no cuts, with the original music, with the exception of one season three episode "Company Picnic" which was originally aired as a one-hour special, before being re-edited and split into two parts for syndication. The DVD presents the syndicated version.

All seven seasons as well as the complete series set were released in Australia in September 2013. The complete series set altered the separate seven season sets to fit into four volumes. A collector's edition boxset which has the seasons split up instead of volumes was released subsequently in 2014. It features everything from the four-volume set and includes a bonus T-shirt. This set is exclusive to Australia.

In May 2009, Turbine Medien announced the first ever Blu-ray release of the complete series in Germany, that was released in September 2001. The release however, was in Standard Definition, in similar fashion to the PAL DVD releases.

== Reception ==
=== Critical response ===
Metacritic, which uses a weighted average, gave the show's first season a score of 88 out of 100 based on 26 reviews, indicating "universal acclaim".

=== Ratings ===
The show achieved Fox's biggest ratings for a premiere since The Simpsons in 1990 with an audience of more than 23 million for the debut episode and Fox's biggest rating for a show aired directly after The Simpsons. 26 million watched the second episode.

Fox shuffled the show's air time repeatedly to make room for other shows. On January 13, 2006, Fox announced that the show would be moving to 7:00 pm on Sundays effective January 29, 2006. The 151st and final episode of the series aired at 8:30 pm ET/PT (the show's original timeslot) on May 14, 2006, and was watched by 7.4 million.

Season	Season premiere	Season finale	TV season	Timeslot	Ranking	Viewers (in millions)
1	January 9, 2000	May 21, 2000	1999–2000	Sundays at 8:30	#18	15.2
2	November 5, 2000	May 20, 2001	2000–01	Sundays (Episodes 1, 3, 5, 7, 9-25); Wednesdays at 8:30 (Episodes 2, 4, 6, 8)	#22	14.5
3	November 11, 2001	May 12, 2002	2001–02	Sundays (Episodes 1, 3, 5-22); Wednesdays at 8:30 (Episodes 2, 4)	#25	13.0
4	November 3, 2002	May 18, 2003	2002–03	Sundays at 9:00	#43	10.7
5	November 2, 2003	May 23, 2004	2003–04	Sundays at 9:00	#71	8.4
6	November 7, 2004	May 15, 2005	2004–05	Sundays at 7:30	#99	5.6
7	September 30, 2005	May 14, 2006	2005–06	Fridays at 8:30 (Episodes 1–11); Sundays at 7:00 (Episodes 12–21); Sunday at 8:30 (Episode 22)	#127	3.8

=== Awards and nominations ===
Jane Kaczmarek and Cloris Leachman were nominated for a Primetime Emmy Award every year they appeared on the show, as leading and guest actress, respectively. Leachman won in 2002 and 2006. Frankie Muniz was nominated once for lead actor, and Bryan Cranston three times for supporting actor. The show won a total of seven Emmys during its six-year run and a Peabody Award. Kaczmarek was nominated for three Golden Globe Awards, Muniz was nominated twice, and Cranston was nominated once.

== Legacy ==
The show was influential as a family sitcom that was not filmed in front of a live studio audience and did not feature a laugh track, in addition to being one of the first comedy series to use a single-camera filming style, which was later used in shows such as The Bernie Mac Show, Scrubs, The Office, Everybody Hates Chris, It's Always Sunny in Philadelphia, 30 Rock, Modern Family, and Arrested Development.

In the 2017 film The Disaster Artist, Bryan Cranston appeared as himself, offering Greg Sestero a guest role on an episode of Malcolm in the Middle.

The series served as inspiration for episode 6 of the Disney+ Marvel Cinematic Universe television miniseries WandaVision, and the intro of WandaVision show in show also parodies Malcolm in the Middle. In episode 8 of the series, a DVD box of the first season can be seen among DVDs of other shows. Later in that same episode, the main characters are watching season seven's second episode "Health Insurance".

== Adaptation ==
In 2013, Russian channel STS produced a shot-for-shot adaptation of Malcolm in the Middle entitled Супер Макс (Super Max), comprising one season.

== Revival ==
In 2016, Bryan Cranston openly expressed interest in doing a reunion. In 2009, Frankie Muniz, while speaking on Steve-O's podcast, revealed that Cranston was writing a script for a movie reunion and that the entire cast was ready to return except for one hold out, though he kept the identity confidential. In December 2023, it was suggested that the hold out was the creator of the show, Linwood Boomer, during Muniz's appearance on Mayim Bialik's podcast and that he would only be part of the revival if two specific previous writers were on board.

In December 2024, it was announced that a four-episode revival was in the works for Disney+ with Muniz, Cranston and Kaczmarek reprising their roles. It follows Malcolm and his daughter as Hal and Lois demand their presence for their 40th wedding anniversary party. Initially, the project was pitched as a two-hour movie before being split into four 30-minute episodes for the streaming service. The series commenced filming in April 2025, in accordance with Muniz's NASCAR schedule. In March 2025, it was revealed that Berfield and Masterson would reprise their roles, while Erik Per Sullivan was replaced by Caleb Ellsworth-Clark as Dewey. Further castings were also revealed with the additions of Anthony Timpano (as Jamie), Vaughan Murrae (as new sibling Kelly), Kiana Madeira (as Malcolm's girlfriend Tristan) and Keeley Karsten (as Malcolm's daughter Leah). The filming was completed in May 2025.

The four-episode miniseries was released on Hulu and Hulu on Disney+ on April 10, 2026.
