= Catherine Lloyd Burns =

American actress (born 1961)

- Occupations: Actress, author
- Years active: 1991–present
- Known for: Caroline Miller in Malcolm in the Middle
- Spouse: Adam Forgash
- Children: 1
- Mother: Red Burns

Catherine Lloyd Burns is an American actress and author who portrayed Caroline Miller, the title character's teacher in the television series Malcolm in the Middle (2000-2006).

== Acting ==
She has appeared in multiple television shows, and was a regular on Partners and LateLine. She played Caroline Miller, Malcolm's "overly earnest" teacher, in Malcolm in the Middle. Burns has appeared in numerous feature films and the independent film Everything Put Together. Along with her role, she was a cowriter of the independent film Everything Put Together. She has also worked in theater with New York's Naked Angels.

== Writing ==
The film Everything Put Together was written by a number of authors, including Catherine and her husband. It was nominated for the Grand Jury Prize at the Sundance Film Festivals in 2000. In 2001, it was nominated for an Independent Spirit Award as the best feature made for under $500,000. Director Marc Forster won Independent Spirit's Someone to Watch Award.

Her first book is It Hit Me Like a Ton of Bricks, which was published by Farrar, Straus and Giroux in 2007. The book is a biography, from the point of view of the author. It centers around personal memoirs and family relationships.

== Personal life ==
Burns is Jewish, She is married to Adam Forgash, with one daughter, and they reside in Brooklyn.

== Filmography ==
=== Film ===
Year	Title	Role	Notes
1993	The Night We Never Met	Deli Customer	
1996	Michael	Evie	
1998	Mafia!	Woman in Las Vegas Show	
1998	The Jungle Book: Mowgli's Story	Chimp 2	Direct-to-video, voice role
1999	Pushing Tin	Tanya Hewitt	
2000	Everything Put Together	Judith	
2000	Keeping the Faith	Debbie	
2003	Disposal	Sandra	Short film
2005	The Baxter	Stella	
2007	Dedication	Mother in Bookstore	
2007	The Last New Yorker	Hostess	
2013	Adult World	Sheryl	
2018	Clara's Ghost	Vet	

=== Television ===
Year	Title	Role	Notes
1991	Hi Honey, I'm Home!	Mo	Episode: "The Many Loves of Mike Duff"
1991	Law & Order	Sheila Herlihy	Episode: "The Wages of Love"
1994	All-American Girl	Tipsy	Episode: "Who's the Boss"
1994	Party of Five	Jeannie	Episode: "Something Out of Nothing"
1995	ER	Amy	Episode: "Love Among the Ruins"
1995	Maybe This Time		Episode: "Maybe This Time"
1995	Dad, the Angel & Me	Fan #1	TV movie
1995–1996	Partners	Heather Pond	Main cast
1996	Seinfeld	Heather	Episode: "Kenny's Roasters"
1996	The Single Guy	April	Episode: "Best Man"
1996	Public Morals	Jackie	Episode: "The Green Cover"
1997	Ned and Stacey	Cynthia	Episode: "Where My Third Nepal Is Sheriff"
1997	The Second Civil War	Amelia Sims	TV movie
1998–1999	LateLine	Mona Guillingsvard	Main cast
2000	Malcolm in the Middle	Caroline Miller	Main cast (seasons 1–2)
2006	Drive/II		TV movie
2016–2020	Search Party	Linda Witherbottom	4 episodes
2017	Shopgirls	Dahlia	Episode: "Dahlia"

=== Video games ===
Year	Title	Role	Notes
1996	Chaos	Worker in Weather Dome	Voice role
1997	Dilbert's Desktop Games	Secretary With a Crossbow	Voice role

== Bibliography ==
- Lloyd Burns, Catherine; It Hit Me Like a Ton of Bricks: A Memoir of a Mother and Daughter, North Point Press, 2006, ISBN 978-0-86547-708-7
- —; The Good, the Bad & the Beagle, Farrar, Straus and Giroux, 2014, ISBN 978-0-374-30039-5
- —; The Half-True Lies of Cricket Cohen, Farrar, Straus and Giroux Books for Young Readers, 2017, ISBN 978-0-374-30041-8
