= List of awards and nominations received by Curb Your Enthusiasm =

The following is a list of awards and nominations for Curb Your Enthusiasm, an American sitcom television series created by (and starring) Larry David and produced and broadcast by HBO, that premiered on October 15, 2000.

== Directors Guild of America ==
Year	Category	Nominee(s)	Results
2002	Outstanding Directing - Comedy Series	Larry Charles (for "The Nanny from Hell")	Nominated
2002	Outstanding Directing - Comedy Series	Bryan Gordon (for "The Special Section")	Won
2002	Outstanding Directing - Comedy Series	David Steinberg (for "Mary, Joseph & Larry")	Nominated
2004	Outstanding Directing - Comedy Series	Bryan Gordon (for "The 5 Wood")	Nominated
2004	Outstanding Directing - Comedy Series	Robert B. Weide (for "The Carpool Lane")	Nominated
2005	Outstanding Directing - Comedy Series	Larry Charles (for "The End")	Nominated
2005	Outstanding Directing - Comedy Series	Bryan Gordon (for "The Korean Bookie")	Nominated
2009	Outstanding Directing - Comedy Series	Larry Charles (for "The Table Read")	Nominated
2009	Outstanding Directing - Comedy Series	Jeff Schaffer (for "Seinfeld")	Nominated
2011	Outstanding Directing - Comedy Series	Robert B. Weide (for "Palestinian Chicken")	Won
2011	Outstanding Directing - Comedy Series	David Steinber (for "The Divorce")	Nominated
2020	Outstanding Directing - Comedy Series	Erin O'Malley (for "The Surprise Party")	Nominated
2020	Outstanding Directing - Comedy Series	Jeff Schaffer (for "The Spite Store")	Nominated

== Eddie Awards ==
- 2018: Best Edited Comedy Series for Non-Commercial Television (Jonathan Corn for "The Shucker")

1 win

== Primetime Emmy Awards ==
Year	Category	Nominee(s)	Episode(s)	Result
2002	Outstanding Comedy Series			Nominated
2002	Outstanding Directing for a Comedy Series	Robert B. Weide	"The Doll"	Nominated
2003	Outstanding Comedy Series			Nominated
2003	Outstanding Lead Actor in a Comedy Series	Larry David		Nominated
2003	Outstanding Supporting Actress in a Comedy Series	Cheryl Hines		Nominated
2003	Outstanding Directing for a Comedy Series	Larry Charles	"The Nanny From Hell"	Nominated
2003	Outstanding Directing for a Comedy Series	Bryan Gordon	"The Special Section"	Nominated
2003	Outstanding Directing for a Comedy Series	David Steinberg	"Mary, Joseph and Larry"	Nominated
2003	Outstanding Directing for a Comedy Series	Robert B. Weide	"Krazee-Eyez Killa"	Won
2003	Outstanding Casting for a Comedy Series	Marla Garlin, Richard Hicks and Ronnie Yeskel		Nominated
2003	Outstanding Single-Camera Picture Editing for a Comedy Series	Jon Corn	"Krazee-Eyez Killa"	Nominated
2003	Outstanding Single-Camera Picture Editing for a Comedy Series	Steven Rasch	"The Corpse-Sniffing Dog"	Nominated
2004	Outstanding Comedy Series			Nominated
2004	Outstanding Lead Actor in a Comedy Series	Larry David		Nominated
2004	Outstanding Directing for a Comedy Series	Larry Charles	"The Survivor"	Nominated
2004	Outstanding Directing for a Comedy Series	Bryan Gordon	"The 5 Wood"	Nominated
2004	Outstanding Directing for a Comedy Series	Robert B. Weide	"The Car Pool Lane"	Nominated
2004	Outstanding Casting for a Comedy Series	Allison Jones		Nominated
2004	Outstanding Single-Camera Picture Editing for a Comedy Series	Jon Corn	"The Survivor"	Nominated
2004	Outstanding Single-Camera Picture Editing for a Comedy Series	Steven Rasch	"Opening Night"	Nominated
2006	Outstanding Comedy Series			Nominated
2006	Outstanding Lead Actor in a Comedy Series	Larry David		Nominated
2006	Outstanding Supporting Actress in a Comedy Series	Cheryl Hines		Nominated
2006	Outstanding Directing for a Comedy Series	Robert B. Weide	"The Christ Nail"	Nominated
2006	Outstanding Casting for a Comedy Series	Allison Jones		Nominated
2006	Outstanding Single-Camera Picture Editing for a Comedy Series	Steven Rasch	"The Ski Lift"	Nominated
2008	Outstanding Comedy Series			Nominated
2008	Outstanding Casting for a Comedy Series	Allison Jones		Nominated
2008	Outstanding Guest Actor in a Comedy Series	Shelley Berman	"The Rat Dog"	Nominated
2008	Outstanding Single-Camera Picture Editing for a Comedy Series	Steven Rasch	"The Bat Mitzvah"	Nominated
2010	Outstanding Comedy Series			Nominated
2010	Outstanding Lead Actor in a Comedy Series	Larry David		Nominated
2010	Outstanding Single-Camera Picture Editing for a Comedy Series	Jonathan Corn and Roger Nygard	"The Table Read"	Nominated
2010	Outstanding Single-Camera Picture Editing for a Comedy Series	Steve Rasch	"The Bare Midriff"	Nominated
2012	Outstanding Comedy Series			Nominated
2012	Outstanding Lead Actor in a Comedy Series	Larry David		Nominated
2012	Outstanding Directing for a Comedy Series	Robert B. Weide	"Palestinian Chicken"	Nominated
2012	Outstanding Guest Actor in a Comedy Series	Michael J. Fox	"Larry vs. Michael J. Fox"	Nominated
2012	Outstanding Single-Camera Picture Editing for a Comedy Series	Steve Rasch	"Palestinian Chicken"	Won
2018	Outstanding Comedy Series			Nominated
2018	Outstanding Lead Actor in a Comedy Series	Larry David		Nominated
2018	Outstanding Guest Actor in a Comedy Series	Bryan Cranston	"Running with the Bulls"	Nominated
2018	Outstanding Guest Actor in a Comedy Series	Lin-Manuel Miranda	"Fatwa!"	Nominated
2020	Outstanding Comedy Series			Nominated
2020	Outstanding Casting for a Comedy Series	Allison Jones and Ben Harris		Nominated
2020	Outstanding Single-Camera Picture Editing for a Comedy Series	Steve Rasch	"Elizabeth, Margaret and Larry"	Nominated
2020	Outstanding Technical Direction and Camerawork for a Series	Jon Purdy, Patrik Thelander, Parker Tolifson, and Ric Griffith	"The Spite Store"	Nominated
2022	Outstanding Comedy Series			Nominated
2022	Outstanding Casting for a Comedy Series	Allison Jones and Ben Harris		Nominated
2022	Outstanding Guest Actor in a Comedy Series	Bill Hader	"Igor, Gregor & Timor"	Nominated
2022	Outstanding Sound Mixing for a Comedy or Drama Series (Half-Hour) and Animation	Earl Martin, Chuck Buch and Michael Miller	"IRASSHAIMASE!"	Nominated
2024	Outstanding Comedy Series			Nominated
2024	Outstanding Lead Actor in a Comedy Series	Larry David		Nominated
2024	Outstanding Casting for a Comedy Series	Allison Jones		Nominated
2024	Outstanding Sound Mixing for a Comedy or Drama Series (Half-Hour) and Animation	Earl Martin, Chuck Buch, Trino Madriz and Sam C. Lewis	"Ken/Kendra"	Nominated

== Golden Globe Award ==
- 2002: Best Actor - Musical or Comedy Series (Larry David)
- 2002: Best Series - Musical or Comedy
- 2004: Best Actor - Musical or Comedy Series (Larry David)
- 2005: Best Actor - Musical or Comedy Series(Larry David)
- 2005: Best Series - Musical or Comedy

1 win

== Hollywood Critics Association TV Awards ==
- 2022: Best Cable Series, Comedy
- 2022: Best Actor in a Broadcast Network or Cable Series, Comedy (Larry David)

== Image Awards ==
- 2004: Outstanding Supporting Actress - Comedy Series (Wanda Sykes)
- 2005: Outstanding Supporting Actress - Comedy Series (Wanda Sykes)
- 2007: Outstanding Supporting Actress - Comedy Series (Vivica A. Fox)

== Producers Guild of America ==
- 2002: Producer of the Year - Episodic Comedy
- 2004: Producer of the Year - Episodic Comedy
- 2006: Producer of the Year - Episodic Comedy
- 2008: Producer of the Year - Episodic Comedy
- 2010: Producer of the Year - Episodic Comedy
- 2012: Producer of the Year - Episodic Comedy
- 2017: Producer of the Year - Episodic Comedy
- 2020: Producer of the Year - Episodic Comedy
- 2021: Producer of the Year - Episodic Comedy

2 wins

== Actor Awards ==
- 2005: Outstanding Actor - Comedy Series (Larry David)
- 2005: Outstanding Cast - Comedy Series (Shelley Berman, Larry David, Susie Essman, Jeff Garlin, Cheryl Hines, Richard Lewis)
- 2009: Outstanding Actor - Comedy Series (Larry David)
- 2009: Outstanding Cast - Comedy Series (Larry David, Susie Essman, Jeff Garlin, Cheryl Hines)
- 2017: Outstanding Actor - Comedy Series (Larry David)
- 2017: Outstanding Cast - Comedy Series: (Ted Danson, Larry David, Susie Essman, Jeff Garlin, Cheryl Hines, J. B. Smoove)

== Writers Guild of America ==
- 2005: Best Writing - Comedy Series (Larry David)
- 2006: Best Writing - Comedy Series (Larry David)
- 2007: Best Writing - Comedy Series (Larry David)
- 2009: Best Writing - Comedy Series (Larry David)
- 2011: Best Writing - Comedy Series (Alec Berg, Larry David, David Mandel, Jeff Schaffer)
- 2017: Best Writing - Comedy Series (Larry David, Jon Hayman, Justin Hurwitz, Jeff Schaffer)
- 2020: Best Writing - Comedy Series (Larry David, Justin Hurwitz, Steve Leff, Carol Leifer, Jeff Schaffer)
- 2021: Best Writing - Comedy Series (Larry David, Steve Leff, Carol Leifer, Jeff Schaffer, Nathaniel Stein)

1 win
