= List of awards and nominations received by Peter Farrelly =

Peter Farrelly awards and nominations
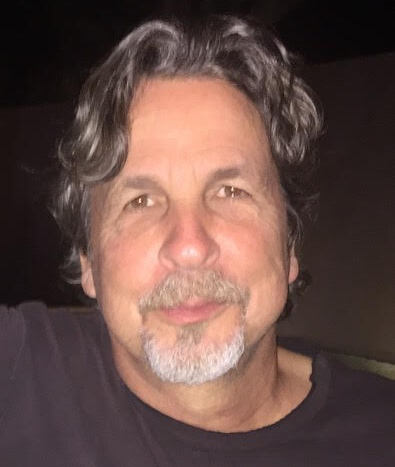
- Farrelly in 2020
Awards and nominations
Award	Wins	Nominations
Academy Awards	2	2
DGA Awards	0	1
BAFTA Awards	0	2
Critics' Choice	0	2
Emmy Awards	0	3
Golden Globes	2	3
PGA Awards	2	2
WGA Awards	0	1

Totals (Note: Certain award groups do not simply award one winner. They acknowledge several different recipients, have runners-up, and have third place. Since this is a specific recognition and is different from losing an award, runner-up mentions are considered wins in this award tally. For simplification and to avoid errors, each award in this list has been presumed to have had a prior nomination.)
- Wins: 16
- Nominations: 34

This is a list of awards and nominations received by Peter Farrelly.

Peter Farrelly is an American film director, screenwriter, producer, and novelist. His accolades including two Academy Awards and two Golden Globe Awards as well as nominations for two BAFTA Awards, two Critics' Choice Awards and three Emmy Awards.

Farrelly started his career directing a slew of successful studio raunchy comedy films including Dumb and Dumber (1994), Kingpin (1996) and There's Something About Mary (1998), the later of which earned him the Visionary Award at the Producers Guild of America Awards. He also directed the co-directed live-action/animated hybrid film Osmosis Jones (2001) which spun a spin-off series Ozzy & Drix (2002–2004) which earned him two nominations for the Daytime Emmy Award for Outstanding Special Class Animated Program.

In 2018 he co-wrote and directed the historical comedy-drama Green Book, which won the Audience Award at the Toronto Film Festival in 2018. He went on to win two Academy Awards for Best Picture and Best Original Screenplay as well as the Golden Globe Award for Best Screenplay. He also was nominated for the Directors Guild of America Award for Outstanding Directing – Feature Film, two BAFTA Awards for Best Film and Best Original Screenplay and two Critics' Choice Movie Awards for Best Director and Best Original Screenplay. He then directed the biographical dramedy I Play Rocky (2026) which was the Toronto International Film Festival People's Choice Award Runner-Up.

== Major associations ==
=== Academy Awards ===
Year	Category	Nominated work	Result	Ref.
2018	Best Picture	Green Book	Won	
2018	Best Original Screenplay	Green Book	Won	

=== BAFTA Awards ===
Year	Category	Nominated work	Result	Ref.
British Academy Film Awards
2018	Best Film	Green Book	Nominated	
2018	Best Original Screenplay	Green Book	Nominated	

=== Critics' Choice Awards ===
Year	Category	Nominated work	Result	Ref.
Critics' Choice Movie Awards
2019	Best Director	Green Book	Nominated	
2019	Best Original Screenplay	Green Book	Nominated	

=== Emmy Awards ===
Year	Category	Nominated work	Result	Ref.
Daytime Emmy Awards
2003	Outstanding Special Class Animated Program	Ozzy & Drix	Nominated	
2004	Outstanding Special Class Animated Program	Ozzy & Drix	Nominated	
Sports Emmy Awards
2010	Outstanding Sports Documentary	The Lost Son of Havana	Nominated	

=== Golden Globe Awards ===
Year	Category	Nominated work	Result	Ref.
2019	Best Motion Picture – Musical or Comedy	Green Book	Won	
2019	Best Director	Green Book	Nominated	
2019	Best Screenplay	Green Book	Won	

== Miscellaneous accolades ==
Award	Year (Note: The listed year refers to the date of the ceremony.)	Category	Work	Result	Ref.
Austin Film Festival	2018	Marquee Feature	Green Book	Won	
Boston Film Festival	2018	Best Film	Green Book	Won	
Denver Film Festival	2018	Narrative Feature	Green Book	Won	
Detroit Film Critics Society	2018	Best Screenplay	Green Book	Won	
Directors Guild of America Awards	2018	Outstanding Directing – Feature Film	Green Book	Nominated	
Florida Film Critics Circle	2018	Best Director	Green Book	Nominated	
Golden Raspberry Awards	2014	Worst Picture	Movie 43	Won	
Golden Raspberry Awards	2014	Worst Director	Movie 43	Won	
Golden Raspberry Awards	2019	Razzie Redeemer Award	Green Book	Nominated	
Hollywood Film Awards	2018	Screenwriter Award	Green Book	Won	
Philadelphia Film Festival	2018	Best Feature	Green Book	Won	
Producers Guild of America Awards	1999	Visionary Award	There's Something About Mary	Won	
Producers Guild of America Awards	2019	Outstanding Producer of Theatrical Motion Pictures	Green Book	Won	
San Diego Film Critics Society	2018	Best Director	Green Book	Nominated	
San Diego Film Critics Society	2018	Best Original Screenplay	Green Book	Nominated	
Satellite Awards	2019	Best Director	Green Book	Nominated	
Satellite Awards	2019	Best Original Screenplay	Green Book	Nominated	
St. Louis International Film Festival	2018	Best Feature Film	Green Book	Won	
Toronto International Film Festival	2018	People's Choice Award	Green Book	Won	
Toronto International Film Festival	2026	People's Choice Award	I Play Rocky	Runner-up	
Washington D.C. Area Film Critics Association	2018	Best Original Screenplay	Green Book	Nominated	
Writers Guild of America Awards	2019	Best Original Screenplay	Green Book	Nominated	
