= Producers Guild of America Visionary Award =

Special award for film, TV and new media producing

The Producers Guild of America Visionary Award is awarded annually by the Producers Guild of America (PGA) at the Producers Guild of America Awards ceremonies to recognize television, film, or new media producers for their unique or uplifting contributions to our culture through inspiring storytelling or performance. The award category was instituted in 2001 and first awarded at the 13th Annual Producer Guild of America Awards, in March 2002.

== Award winners ==
Ceremony	Recipient	Awarded for
13th	Joel Gallen	"producing the landmark post-9/11 telethon America: A Tribute to Heroes"
14th	Rita Wilson	My Big Fat Greek Wedding
15th	Mike Nichols and Cary Brokaw	"HBO’s Angels in America."
16th	Jim Serpico	Rescue Me
17th	not awarded	
18th	Kenneth Ehrlich	
19th	Simon Fuller	"American Idol and Idol Gives Back"
20th	Jeffrey Skoll	"his work with Participant Media"
21st	not awarded	
22nd	not awarded	
23rd	Laura Ziskin	"her passionate commitment to storytelling as well as her remarkable efforts in organizing the recent Stand Up to Cancer campaign and its multi-platform programming. Ziskin also received the Producers Guild’s David O. Selznick Achievement Award in 2005, and is the first recipient of the Selznick Award to be so honored as a PGA visionary."
24th	Russell Simmons	"his dedication to philanthropy and his work as a film and television producer who breaks down barriers to provide opportunities to emerging talent. From the seminal television series Def Comedy Jam to his role as a UN Goodwill Ambassador, Simmons continues to inspire people through his work as a creative and cultural visionary."
25th	Chris Meledandri	being "one of the definitive producers of contemporary animation. He receives this award just as the latest blockbuster hit that he has produced, Universal and Illumination’s Despicable Me 2, becomes the 5th highest-grossing animated film of all time worldwide at the global box office."
26th	Plan B Entertainment (Brad Pitt, Dede Gardner, and Jeremy Kleiner)	"producing stories that have breathed new life into some of the seminal—and in some cases, most painful—episodes of our shared history. Plan B Entertainment receives this award on heels of their upcoming film, Selma, adding to the company’s already impressive roster of critically acclaimed films such as 12 Years a Slave, HBO's The Normal Heart, World War Z, Tree of Life and The Departed, among many others."
27th	Industrial Light & Magic	"ILM’s groundbreaking work in visual effects and innovations that have revolutionized storytelling. For nearly 40 years, ILM has played a key role in numerous worldwide box-office hits, including Star Wars Episodes I – VII, the Harry Potter franchise, the Transformers franchise, the Marvel Cinematic Universe, the Pirates of the Caribbean films, The Revenant and countless others."
28th	Megan Ellison	"her work as a fierce supporter of distinctive and creative voices in contemporary filmmaking, bringing to life a collection of stories that have broadened audience perspectives on our world and challenged our industry’s assumptions about the kinds of stories motion pictures can tell. Ellison receives this award on the heels of the upcoming film, 20th Century Women, adding to her already impressive roster of critically acclaimed films such as American Hustle, Her, The Master, Zero Dark Thirty, and Foxcatcher among many others."
29th	Ava DuVernay	"her work in creating topical films and television shows focusing on important social issues such as 13th, the riveting documentary about race in America for which she earned two Emmys and an Academy Award nomination, as well as her critically-acclaimed hit television series Queen Sugar."
30th	Kenya Barris	being "a trailblazing storyteller whose work has advanced and expanded the representation of diverse perspectives within mainstream media. As the creator of the hit, Peabody award-winning and Emmy-nominated® series “Black-ish,” along with its successful spin-off series “Grown-ish,” and the writer of last summer’s comedy blockbuster “Girls Trip,” Barris has earned praise for honest portrayals of the Black experience that have not only resonated with a broad spectrum of audiences but have continually served as a catalyst for conversations around an array of timely topics. Through his work, Barris has fearlessly tackled difficult social issues, poignantly reflected our culture, and unified audiences through powerful stories that highlight our shared humanity."
