= Producers Guild of America Award for Best Episodic Comedy =

- Awarded for: Outstanding Production of Episodic Television, Comedy
- Country: United States
- Presented by: Producers Guild of America
- First award: 2000
- Currently held by: Hacks (2024)

The Producers Guild of America Award for Best Episodic Comedy, also known as the Danny Thomas Award for Outstanding Producer of Episodic Television, Comedy, is an annual award given by the Producers Guild of America since 2000.

== Previous PGA television awards ==
Prior to 2000, the award for outstanding producer of episodic television was not split into comedy and drama. Out of the eleven honored television programs, two were episodic comedies:

1. 1991: Brooklyn Bridge (CBS)
2. 1995: Frasier (NBC)

== Winners and nominees ==
=== 2000s ===
| Year | Winners and nominees | Network | Season | Ref. |
|---|---|---|---|---|
| 2000 (12th) | Sex and the City | HBO | Season 3 | |
| 2000 (12th) | Ally McBeal | Fox | Seasons 3B and 4A | |
| 2000 (12th) | Frasier | NBC | Seasons 7B and 8A | |
| 2000 (12th) | Friends | NBC | Seasons 6B and 7A | |
| 2000 (12th) | Will & Grace | NBC | Seasons 2B and 3A | |
| 2001 (13th) | Sex and the City | HBO | Season 4A | |
| 2001 (13th) | Frasier | NBC | Seasons 8B and 9A | |
| 2001 (13th) | Friends | NBC | Seasons 7B and 8A | |
| 2001 (13th) | Malcolm in the Middle | Fox | Seasons 2B and 3A | |
| 2001 (13th) | Will & Grace | NBC | Seasons 3B and 4A | |
| 2002 (14th) | Curb Your Enthusiasm | HBO | Season 3 | |
| 2002 (14th) | Everybody Loves Raymond | CBS | Seasons 6B and 7A | |
| 2002 (14th) | Malcolm in the Middle | Fox | Seasons 3B and 4A | |
| 2002 (14th) | Sex and the City | HBO | Seasons 4B and 5 | |
| 2002 (14th) | Will & Grace | NBC | Seasons 4B and 5A | |
| 2003 (15th) | Sex and the City | HBO | Season 6A | |
| 2003 (15th) | Everybody Loves Raymond | CBS | Seasons 7B and 8A | |
| 2003 (15th) | Malcolm in the Middle | Fox | Seasons 4B and 5A | |
| 2003 (15th) | Scrubs | NBC | Seasons 2B and 3A | |
| 2003 (15th) | Will & Grace | NBC | Seasons 5B and 6A | |
| 2004 (16th) | Curb Your Enthusiasm | HBO | Season 4 | |
| 2004 (16th) | Arrested Development | Fox | Season 1B | |
| 2004 (16th) | Scrubs | NBC | Season 3B | |
| 2004 (16th) | Sex and the City | HBO | Season 6B | |
| 2004 (16th) | Will & Grace | NBC | Season 6B | |
| 2005 (17th) | Entourage | HBO | Season 2 | |
| 2005 (17th) | Arrested Development | Fox | Season 2 | |
| 2005 (17th) | Desperate Housewives | ABC | Season 1 | |
| 2005 (17th) | Scrubs | NBC | Season 4 | |
| 2005 (17th) | Two and a Half Men | CBS | Season 2 | |
| 2006 (18th) | The Office | NBC | Season 2 | |
| 2006 (18th) | Arrested Development | Fox | Season 3 | |
| 2006 (18th) | Curb Your Enthusiasm | HBO | Season 5 | |
| 2006 (18th) | My Name Is Earl | NBC | Season 1 | |
| 2006 (18th) | Weeds | Showtime | Season 1 | |
| 2007 (19th) | 30 Rock | NBC | Season 1 | |
| 2007 (19th) | Entourage | HBO | Season 3 | |
| 2007 (19th) | Extras | HBO | Season 2 | |
| 2007 (19th) | The Office | NBC | Season 3 | |
| 2007 (19th) | Ugly Betty | ABC | Season 1 | |
| 2008 (20th) | 30 Rock | NBC | Season 2 | |
| 2008 (20th) | Curb Your Enthusiasm | HBO | Season 6 | |
| 2008 (20th) | Entourage | HBO | Season 4 | |
| 2008 (20th) | The Office | NBC | Season 4 | |
| 2008 (20th) | Weeds | Showtime | Season 3 | |
| 2009 (21st) | 30 Rock | NBC | Season 3 | |
| 2009 (21st) | Californication | Showtime | Season 2 | |
| 2009 (21st) | Entourage | HBO | Season 5 | |
| 2009 (21st) | The Office | NBC | Season 5 | |
| 2009 (21st) | Weeds | Showtime | Season 4 | |

=== 2010s ===
| Year | Winners and nominees | Network | Season | Ref. |
|---|---|---|---|---|
| 2010 (22nd) | Modern Family | ABC | Season 1 | |
| 2010 (22nd) | Curb Your Enthusiasm | HBO | Season 7 | |
| 2010 (22nd) | Glee | Fox | Season 1 | |
| 2010 (22nd) | The Office | NBC | Season 6 | |
| 2010 (22nd) | 30 Rock | NBC | Season 4 | |
| 2011 (23rd) | Modern Family | ABC | Season 2 | |
| 2011 (23rd) | The Big Bang Theory | CBS | Season 4 | |
| 2011 (23rd) | Glee | Fox | Season 2 | |
| 2011 (23rd) | Parks and Recreation | NBC | Season 3 | |
| 2011 (23rd) | 30 Rock | NBC | Season 5 | |
| 2012 (24th) | Modern Family | ABC | Season 3 | |
| 2012 (24th) | The Big Bang Theory | CBS | Season 5 | |
| 2012 (24th) | Curb Your Enthusiasm | HBO | Season 8 | |
| 2012 (24th) | Louie | FX | Season 2 | |
| 2012 (24th) | 30 Rock | NBC | Season 6 | |
| 2013 (25th) | Modern Family | ABC | Season 4 | |
| 2013 (25th) | Arrested Development | Netflix | Season 4 | |
| 2013 (25th) | The Big Bang Theory | CBS | Season 6 | |
| 2013 (25th) | 30 Rock | NBC | Season 7 | |
| 2013 (25th) | Veep | HBO | Season 2 | |
| 2014 (26th) | Orange Is the New Black | Netflix | Season 1 | |
| 2014 (26th) | The Big Bang Theory | CBS | Season 7 | |
| 2014 (26th) | Louie | FX | Season 4 | |
| 2014 (26th) | Modern Family | ABC | Season 5 | |
| 2014 (26th) | Veep | HBO | Season 3 | |
| 2015 (27th) | Transparent | Amazon Prime Video | Season 1 | |
| 2015 (27th) | Inside Amy Schumer | Comedy Central | Season 3 | |
| 2015 (27th) | Modern Family | ABC | Season 6 | |
| 2015 (27th) | Silicon Valley | HBO | Season 2 | |
| 2015 (27th) | Veep | HBO | Season 4 | |
| 2016 (28th) | Atlanta | FX | Season 1 | |
| 2016 (28th) | Black-ish | ABC | Seasons 2 and 3A | |
| 2016 (28th) | Modern Family | ABC | Seasons 7 and 8A | |
| 2016 (28th) | Silicon Valley | HBO | Season 3 | |
| 2016 (28th) | Veep | HBO | Season 5 | |
| 2017 (29th) | The Marvelous Mrs. Maisel | Amazon Prime Video | Season 1 | |
| 2017 (29th) | Curb Your Enthusiasm | HBO | Season 9 | |
| 2017 (29th) | Master of None | Netflix | Season 2 | |
| 2017 (29th) | Silicon Valley | HBO | Season 4 | |
| 2017 (29th) | Veep | HBO | Season 6 | |
| 2018 (30th) | The Marvelous Mrs. Maisel | Amazon Prime Video | Season 2 | |
| 2018 (30th) | Atlanta | FX | Season 2 | |
| 2018 (30th) | Barry | HBO | Season 1 | |
| 2018 (30th) | GLOW | Netflix | Season 2 | |
| 2018 (30th) | The Good Place | NBC | Seasons 2B and 3A | |
| 2019 (31st) | Fleabag | Amazon Prime Video | Season 2 | |
| 2019 (31st) | Barry | HBO | Season 2 | |
| 2019 (31st) | The Marvelous Mrs. Maisel | Amazon Prime Video | Season 3 | |
| 2019 (31st) | Schitt's Creek | Pop TV | Season 5 | |
| 2019 (31st) | Veep | HBO | Season 7 | |

=== 2020s ===
| Year | Winners and nominees | Network | Season | Ref. |
|---|---|---|---|---|
| 2020 (32nd) | Schitt's Creek | Pop TV | Season 6 | |
| 2020 (32nd) | Curb Your Enthusiasm | HBO | Season 10 | |
| 2020 (32nd) | The Flight Attendant | HBO Max | Season 1 | |
| 2020 (32nd) | Ted Lasso | Apple TV+ | Season 1 | |
| 2020 (32nd) | What We Do in the Shadows | FX | Season 2 | |
| 2021 (33rd) | Ted Lasso | Apple TV+ | Season 2 | |
| 2021 (33rd) | Cobra Kai | Netflix | Seasons 3 and 4 | |
| 2021 (33rd) | Curb Your Enthusiasm | HBO | Season 11 | |
| 2021 (33rd) | Hacks | HBO Max | Season 1 | |
| 2021 (33rd) | Only Murders in the Building | Hulu | Season 1 | |
| 2022 (34th) | The Bear | FX | Season 1 | |
| 2022 (34th) | Abbott Elementary | ABC | Seasons 1 and 2A | |
| 2022 (34th) | Barry | HBO | Season 3 | |
| 2022 (34th) | Hacks | HBO Max | Season 2 | |
| 2022 (34th) | Only Murders in the Building | Hulu | Season 2 | |
| 2023 (35th) | The Bear | FX | Season 2 | |
| 2023 (35th) | Barry | HBO | Season 4 | |
| 2023 (35th) | Jury Duty | Freevee | Season 1 | |
| 2023 (35th) | Only Murders in the Building | Hulu | Season 3 | |
| 2023 (35th) | Ted Lasso | Apple TV+ | Season 3 | |
| 2024 (36th) | Hacks | Max | Season 3 | |
| 2024 (36th) | Abbott Elementary | ABC | Season 3 | |
| 2024 (36th) | The Bear | FX | Season 3 | |
| 2024 (36th) | Curb Your Enthusiasm | HBO | Season 12 | |
| 2024 (36th) | Only Murders in the Building | Hulu | Season 4 | |

== Total awards by network ==
- HBO – 6
- ABC – 5
- NBC – 5
- Amazon – 4
- FX – 3
- Apple TV+ – 1
- CBS – 1
- HBO Max / Max – 1
- Netflix – 1
- Pop TV – 1

== Total nominations by network ==
- HBO – 33
- NBC – 27
- ABC – 12
- Fox – 9
- FX – 8
- CBS – 7
- Amazon – 5
- Netflix – 5
- Hulu – 4
- HBO Max / Max – 4
- Showtime – 4
- Apple TV+ – 3
- Pop – 2
- Comedy Central – 1
- Freevee – 1

== Programs with multiple awards ==
4 awards

- Modern Family (consecutive)

3 awards

- 30 Rock (consecutive)
- Sex and the City (2 consecutive)

2 awards

- The Bear (consecutive)
- Curb Your Enthusiasm
- The Marvelous Mrs. Maisel (consecutive)

== Programs with multiple nominations ==
10 nominations

- Curb Your Enthusiasm

7 nominations

- 30 Rock
- Modern Family

6 nominations

- Veep

5 nominations

- Sex and the City
- The Office
- Will & Grace

4 nominations

- Arrested Development
- Barry
- The Big Bang Theory
- Entourage
- Only Murders in the Building

3 nominations

- The Bear
- Hacks
- Malcolm in the Middle
- The Marvelous Mrs. Maisel
- Scrubs
- Silicon Valley
- Ted Lasso
- Weeds

2 nominations

- Abbott Elementary
- Atlanta
- Everybody Loves Raymond
- Frasier
- Friends
- Glee
- Louie
- Schitt's Creek
