= Sex and the City season 4 =

Season of American television series

Sex and the City
- Season 4
- Promotional poster
- No. of episodes: 18

Release
- Original network: HBO
- Original release: June 3, 2001 – February 10, 2002

Season chronology
- ← Previous; Season 3 Next → Season 5

The fourth season of the American television romantic comedy-drama Sex and the City aired in the United States on HBO. The show was created by Darren Star while Star, Michael Patrick King, John P. Melfi, series lead actress Sarah Jessica Parker, Cindy Chupack, and Jenny Bicks served as executive producers. The series was produced by Darren Star Productions, HBO Original Programming, and Warner Bros. Television. Sarah Jessica Parker portrays the lead character Carrie Bradshaw, while Kim Cattrall, Kristin Davis and Cynthia Nixon played her best friends Samantha Jones, Charlotte York, and Miranda Hobbes.

Season four marks dramatic changes in the ladies' lives. Carrie gets back together with Aidan (John Corbett), eventually getting engaged and has him move in with her. Miranda, while maintaining her single life, supports Steve (David Eigenberg) through his bout with testicular cancer and, after a one-night stand together, becomes pregnant by him despite having only one testicle left. Samantha dates a Brazilian lesbian artist Maria (Sônia Braga) and starts a serious relationship with her client and hotelier Richard Wright (James Remar). Charlotte gets back together with Trey (Kyle MacLachlan) after their separation and after deciding to have a baby, they struggle to get pregnant and ultimately divorce.

The 4th season, comprising 18 episodes, continued airing on Sunday nights at 9:00 PM during the summer months, but unlike the previous seasons, the first twelve episodes aired during the summer, starting from June 3, 2001 and the remaining six aired during January and February 2002, ending on February 10, 2002. In the United Kingdom, the season was broadcast on Wednesday nights at 10:00 PM, two episodes a night, between January 9 and March 6, 2002. The season continued the series' critical and award success, with the series winning 3 Emmy awards, 2 Golden Globe awards, and a SAG award. Season four also achieved high ratings in the United States and United Kingdom.

The fourth season was released on DVD as a three-disc boxed set titled Sex and the City: The Complete Season 4 on May 20, 2003 by HBO Home Video.

== Production ==
The fourth season of Sex and the City was produced by Darren Star Productions and Warner Bros. Television, in association with HBO Original Programming. The series is based on the book of the same name, written by Candice Bushnell, which contains stories from her column with the New York Observer. The show featured production from Antonia Ellis, Jane Raab and series star Sarah Jessica Parker, also an executive producer alongside Michael Patrick King, John Melfi, Cindy Chupack, and Jenny Bicks. Episodic writers return for the fourth season included Bicks, Chupack, Allan Heinberg, King, Julie Rottenberg, and Elisa Zuritsky. New writers enlisted for the season included Nicole Avril, Jessica Bendinger, and Amy B. Harris. The season was directed by returning directors Allen Coulter, King, Charles McDougall, Michael Spiller, and Alan Taylor. Directors new to the series included Martha Coolidge, Michael Engler, and David Frankel.

== Cast and characters ==
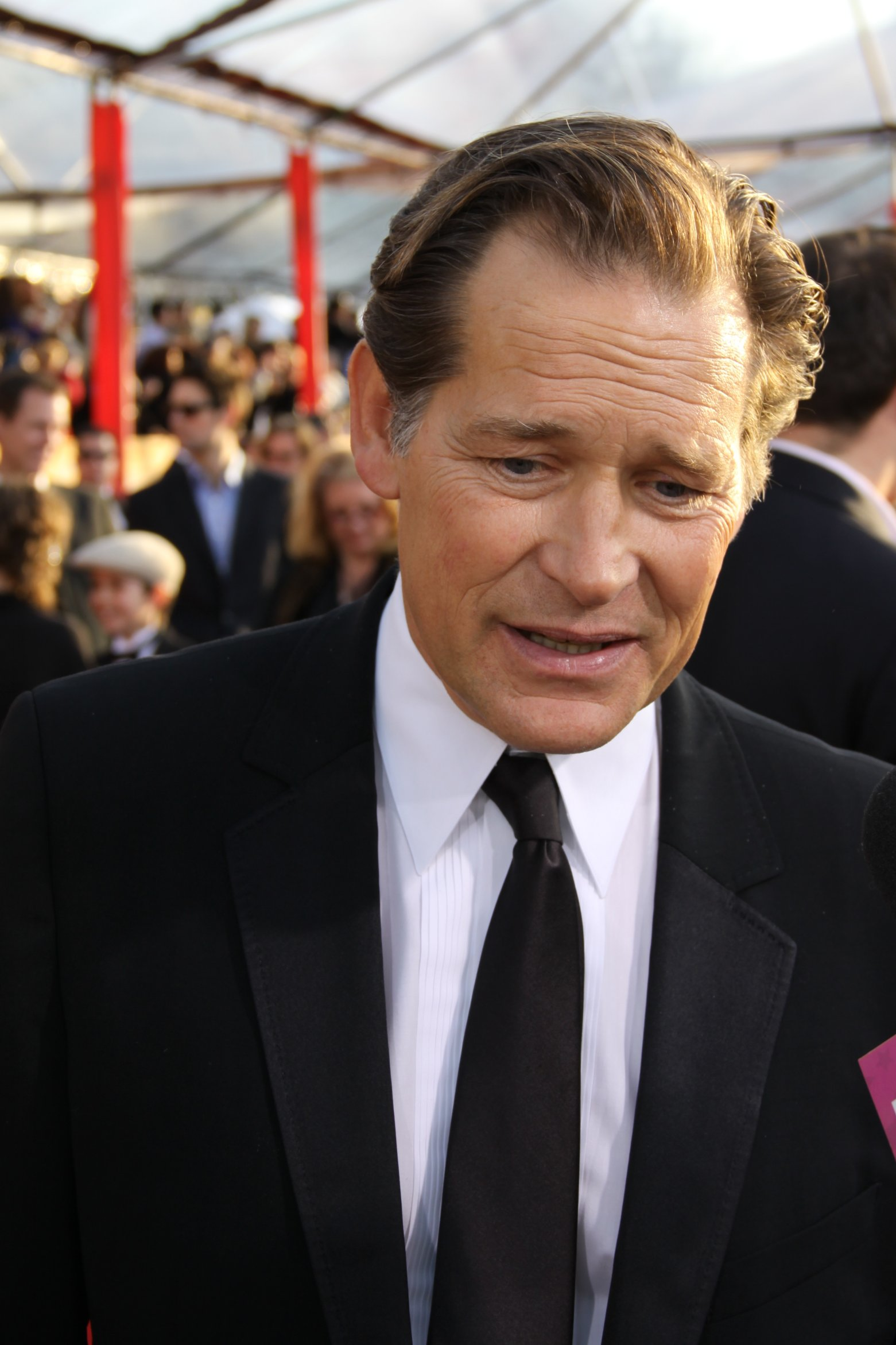
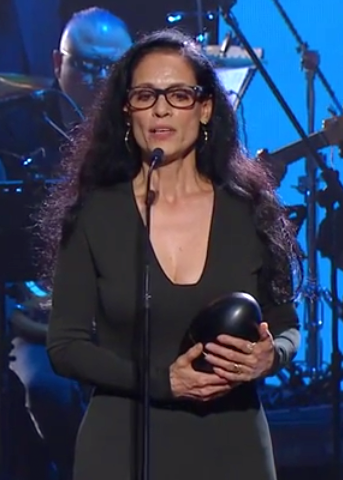
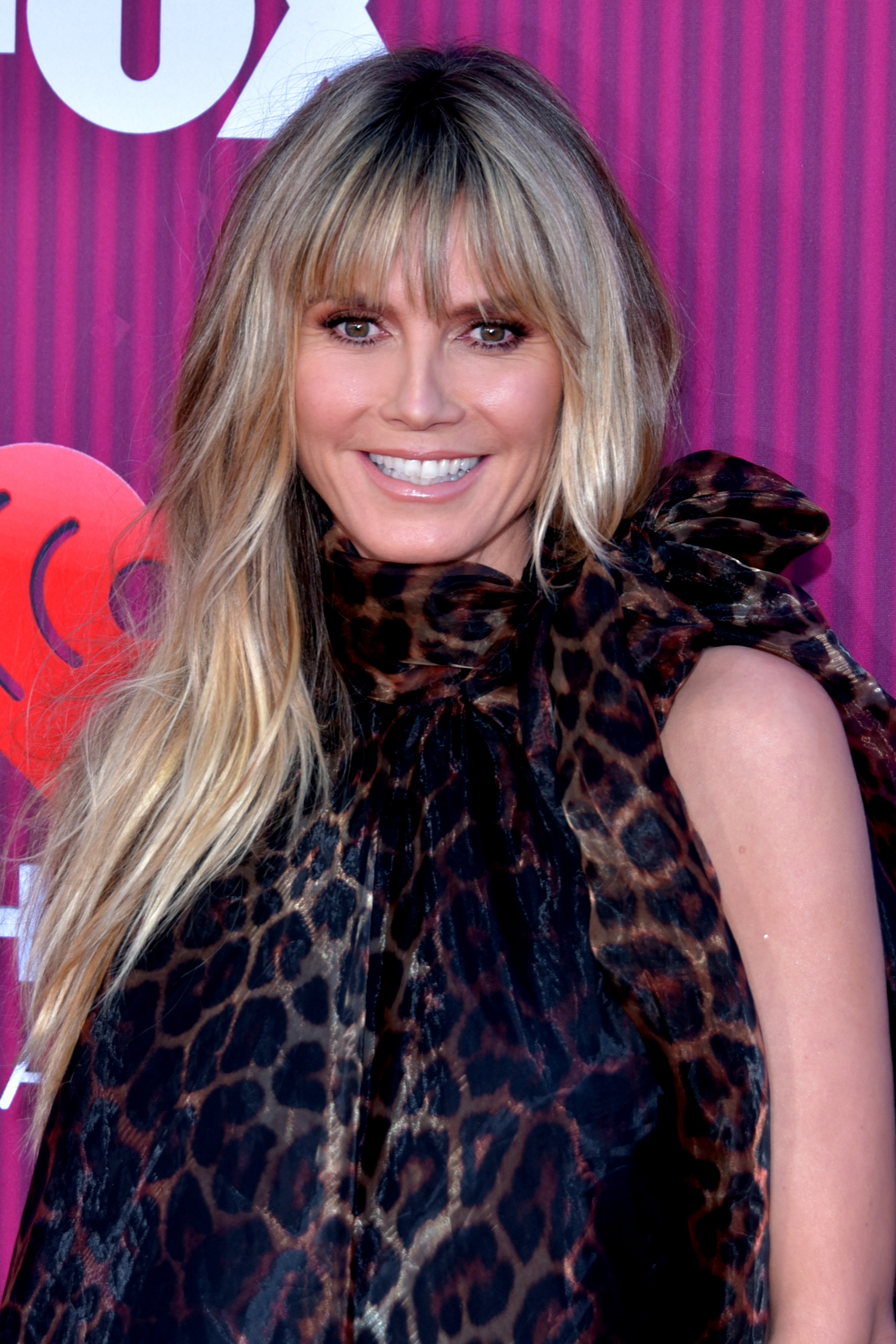
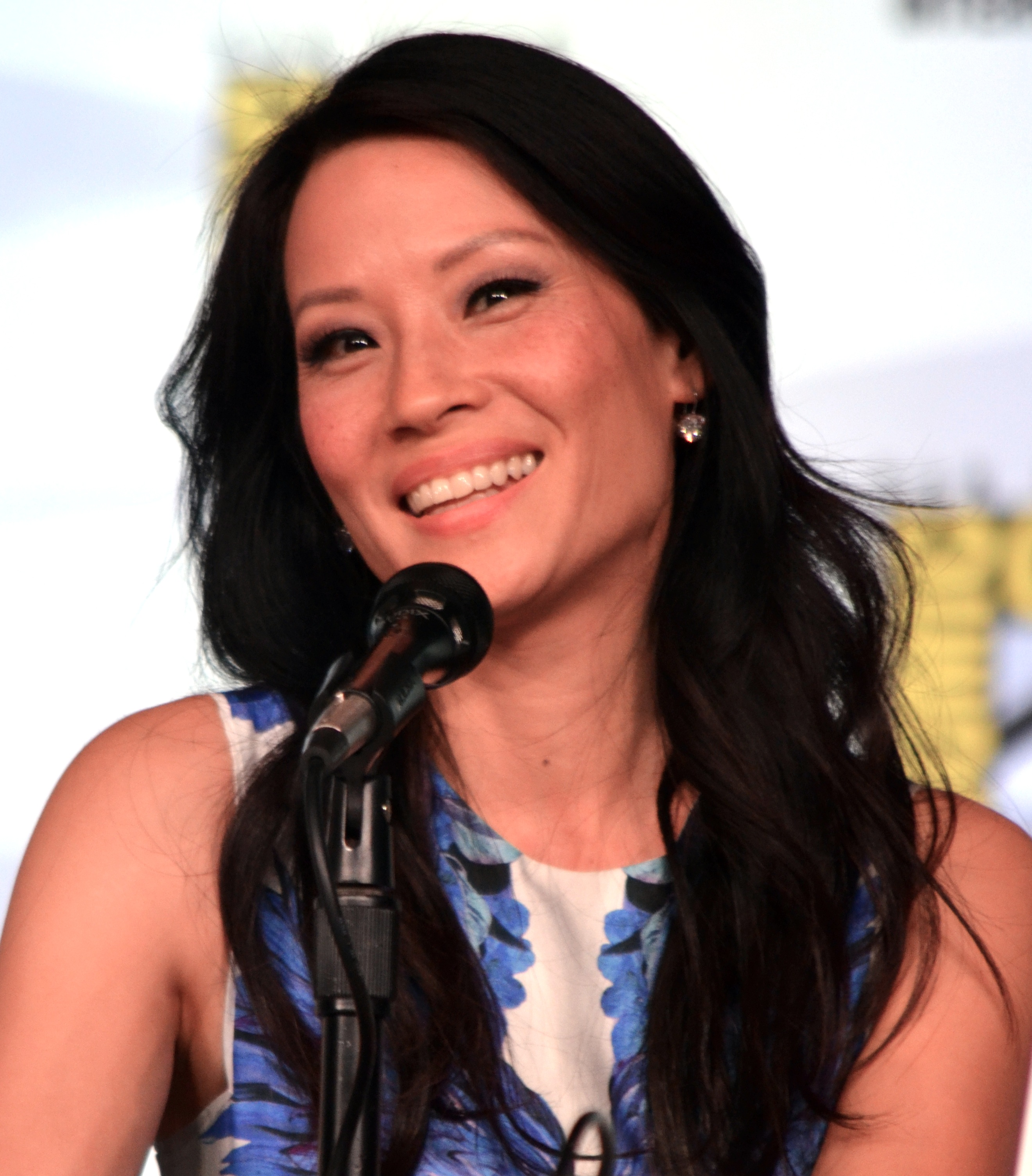
The fourth season introduced characters Richard Wright (James Remar) and Maria Diega Reyes (Sônia Braga), both of whom Samantha dated. The season also featured a number of cameo appearances from celebrities like Heidi Klum and Lucy Liu.

Like the previous seasons, season four features the same principal cast and characters. Sarah Jessica Parker portrays Carrie Bradshaw, a fashionable thirty-something woman who writes about sex and life in New York City in her column, "Sex and the City", with the fictional New York Star. Kim Cattrall played the promiscuous public relations agent Samantha Jones. Kristin Davis portrayed Charlotte York MacDougal, an optimistic, strait-laced former art curator who remains the most traditional amongst her friends in terms of relationships and public decorum. Cynthia Nixon acted as the acerbic and sarcastic lawyer Miranda Hobbes, who holds a pessimistic view on relationships and men.

The fourth season featured a number of recurring and guest actors whose characters contributed significantly to the series plotlines. Chris Noth reprised his role as Mr. Big, a sly businessman who at this point remains friends with Carrie despite their previous romantic relationships. David Eigenberg portrayed Miranda's on-off boyfriend, bar owner and father of her child Steve Brady. Willie Garson played entertainment manager and Carrie's gay friend Stanford Blatch. Kyle MacLachlan appeared as Trey MacDougal, a doctor with Scottish ancestry and Charlotte's nearly impotent husband. John Corbett reprised his role as Aidan Shaw, a carpenter, bar owner and Carrie's boyfriend-turned-fiancé. Mario Cantone returns to the series as a recurring guest actor, portraying Charlotte's gay friend and former wedding planner Anthony Marantino. Sônia Braga joined the series as Maria Diega Reyes, an artist and Samantha's girlfriend. Frances Sternhagen reprised her role as Trey's overbearing and intrusive mother Bunny MacDougal; she received an Emmy nomination for her performance in the series. James Remar appeared in the fourth season as hotelier and Samantha's boyfriend Richard Wright. Lynn Cohen reprises her role as Magda, Miranda's foreign housekeeper.

"The Real Me" features cameo appearances from comedienne Margaret Cho, Alan Cumming, supermodel Heidi Klum, Ed Koch, Tony Hale, Kevyn Aucoin, Domenico Dolce, and Stefano Gabbana. Lucy Liu appeared as herself in the episode "Coulda, Woulda, Shoulda". In the episode "A 'Vogue' Idea", Candice Bergen portrayed Enid Mead, Carrie's publisher at Vogue magazine. Ron Rifkin played Carrie's boss Julian in the episode.

== Reception ==
=== Viewership and ratings ===
Season four of Sex and the City debuted on June 3, 2001 with the episodes "The Agony and the 'Ex'-tacy" and "The Real Me". The episodes were seen by 6.49 million people and 5.93 million people respectively. Viewership for the first twelve episodes of the season held above five million viewers, with a majority of them crossing 5.5 million viewers. Unlike the second and third seasons, season four aired twelve episodes in the summer and the remaining six in the winter to make room for the new miniseries Band of Brothers. The remaining six episodes that aired in the winter set highs for the series, with the premiere episode "The Good Fight" attracting 7.30 million viewers and a 4.7 household rating, translating to 4.97 million households. Another reason for the split in season broadcast was the September 11, 2001 attacks on the World Trade Center in New York. It was deemed inappropriate to continue the series' broadcast after the devastation in the same city the show was set, and would have seemed insensitive to the victims and families. The seventeenth episode "A 'Vogue' Idea", which was viewed by 4.34 million viewers, garnered the lowest ratings of the season. The season finale episode "I Heart NY" garnered the series' highest ratings at the time, 7.39 million viewers watching it upon initial broadcast and achieving a 4.9 household rating.

=== Critical reviews ===
Terry Kelleher of People Weekly commended the series, noting that "hasn't yet passed its freshness date." Ken Tucker of Entertainment Weekly was less enthusiastic about the season, praising the second episode for its theme but deemed the series tame, adding that "once you’ve programmed raunch like ”G-String Divas,” randy sitcoms just seem…randy."

=== Awards and nominations ===
Primetime Emmy Awards record
- 1. Outstanding Directing for a Comedy Series (Michael Patrick King for "The Real Me")
- 2. Outstanding Casting for a Comedy Series (Jennifer McNamara)
- 3. Outstanding Costumes for a Series (Patricia Field, Rebecca Weinberg, Artie Hach, Eric Daman, Molly Rogers, and Mark Agnes for "Defining Moments")

Golden Globe Awards record
- 1. Best Television Series – Musical or Comedy
- 2. Best Actress – Television Series Musical or Comedy (Sarah Jessica Parker)

Screen Actors Guild Awards record
- 1. Outstanding Performance by an Ensemble in a Comedy Series (cast of Sex and the City)

At the 59th Golden Globe Awards, the series won the award for Best Television Series – Musical or Comedy for the third consecutive year. Sarah Jessica Parker also won the award for Best Actress – Television Series Musical or Comedy for the third consecutive year. John Corbett was nominated for the award for Best Supporting Actor – Series, Miniseries or Television Film, but lost to Stanley Tucci. At the 8th Screen Actors Guild Awards, the award for Outstanding Performance by an Ensemble in a Comedy Series was awarded to the main cast for Sex and the City. Parker and Kim Cattrall both received nominations for the award for Outstanding Performance by a Female Actor in a Comedy Series.

At the 54th Primetime Emmy Awards, Sex and the City received ten nominations and won awards for Outstanding Casting for a Comedy Series, Outstanding Costumes for a Series for the episode "Defining Moments", and Outstanding Directing for a Comedy Series for the episode "The Real Me", which directed by Michael Patrick King. The series was also nominated for the award for Outstanding Comedy Series for the fourth time, but lost to Friends. Parker was nominated for the award for Outstanding Lead Actress in a Comedy Series for the fourth time. Kim Cattrall and Cynthia Nixon were both nominated for an Outstanding Supporting Actress in a Comedy Series Emmy for their respective portrays of Samantha Jones and Miranda Hobbes, being Cattrall's third nomination and Nixon's first.

Season four episodes "My Motherboard, My Self" and "Just Say Yes", written by Cindy Chupack and Julie Rottenberg & Elisa Zuritsky, were nominated for Best Writing - Episodic Comedy at the 2002 WGA Awards. Costume designer Patricia Field was nominated for the Costume Designers Guild Award for Best Costume Design – Contemporary TV Series. The Directors Guild of America nominated three episodes from season four - "Defining Moments" (directed by Allen Coulter), "My Motherboard, My Self" (directed by Michael Engler), and "The Real Me" (directed by Michael Patrick King) - for the award for Outstanding Directing – Comedy Series. At the 13th PGA Golden Laurel Awards, Cindy Chupack, Michael Patrick King, John P. Melfi and Sarah Jessica Parker were nominated for the award for Television Producer of the Year Award in Episodic - Comedy for their production work on the series.

== Episodes ==
No. overall	No. in season	Title	Directed by	Written by	Original release date	Prod. code	U.S. viewers (millions)
49	1	"The Agony and the 'Ex'-tacy"	Michael Patrick King	Michael Patrick King	June 3, 2001	401	6.49
Carrie thinks about men and the future when no one shows up for her birthday party. Miranda confronts her married friends about her single life. Charlotte tries to deal with her separation from Trey. Samantha tries to seduce a celibate monk. The girls make a pact that they are each other's soulmates, and men are nice guys to have fun with.
50	2	"The Real Me"	Michael Patrick King	Michael Patrick King	June 3, 2001	402	5.93
Carrie is reluctant when asked to be a celebrity model in a high-profile fashion show. Miranda gets a lesson in confidence when a buff guy at the gym asks her out. Charlotte works up the courage to look at her "depressed" vagina in a hand-mirror. Samantha immortalizes herself by having nude photographs taken. Michael Patrick King won the Primetime Emmy Award for Outstanding Directing for a Comedy Series for this episode.
51	3	"Defining Moments"	Allen Coulter	Jenny Bicks	June 10, 2001	403	5.48
Carrie meets a jazz musician named Ray King while on a pseudo-date with Big. Miranda tries to get more comfortable using the bathroom in front of her date. Charlotte is dismayed that Trey only wants to have sex in places where they can get caught. Samantha meets Maria, a lesbian painter, at Charlotte's gallery, and questions her own sexuality.
52	4	"What's Sex Got to Do with It?"	Allen Coulter	Nicole Avril	June 17, 2001	404	5.13
Carrie continues to date Ray, but finds he has an ADHD problem. Miranda substitutes chocolate for sex. Charlotte deals with Trey getting a little too overconfident in bed. Samantha tells the girls she is in a relationship with Maria and is now a lesbian.
53	5	"Ghost Town"	Michael Spiller	Allan Heinberg	June 24, 2001	405	5.84
Carrie gets an invitation to the opening of Steve and Aidan's new bar, Scout. Miranda believes there is a ghost in her apartment. Charlotte butts heads with Trey's mother, Bunny, when redecorating their apartment. Samantha's girlfriend Maria gets fed up with the many men from Samantha's past.
54	6	"Baby, Talk Is Cheap"	Michael Spiller	Cindy Chupack	July 1, 2001	406	5.47
Carrie realizes she wants to get back together with Aidan. Miranda is surprised when the man she met while training for an upcoming marathon enjoys performing anilingus—and expects to receive it as well. Charlotte and Trey decide to start trying to have a baby. Samantha wears fake nipples and attracts a man who uses baby talk during sex.
55	7	"Time and Punishment"	Michael Engler	Jessica Bendinger	July 8, 2001	407	5.59
Big calls Carrie—while she's having sex with Aidan. Miranda throws her neck out after fighting with Charlotte. Charlotte decides to leave the gallery to pursue motherhood full-time. Samantha's latest guy tells her she needs to shave below the belt.
56	8	"My Motherboard, My Self"	Michael Engler	Julie Rottenberg & Elisa Zuritsky	July 15, 2001	408	5.37
Carrie's laptop crashes, and when Aidan tries to help, she pushes him away. Miranda's mother dies unexpectedly, but at the funeral, her family is more upset by her single status. Charlotte becomes the "Martha Stewart of funerals". Samantha "loses" her orgasm.
57	9	"Sex and the Country"	Michael Spiller	Allan Heinberg	July 22, 2001	409	5.80
Carrie is dragged to Aidan's country home in Suffern, New York. Charlotte visits the MacDougal "compound" in Connecticut. Miranda yells at Steve when he tells her he has testicular cancer but has no clue about his condition. Samantha gets annoyed when her dates keep asking her what she's doing "next weekend".
58	10	"Belles of the Balls"	Michael Spiller	Michael Patrick King	July 29, 2001	410	5.98
Carrie invites Big up to Aidan's country home to talk. Charlotte tries to discuss her and Trey's infertility problems. Miranda sleeps with Steve to cheer him up after he has one of his testicles removed. Samantha tries to get the PR position for hotelier Richard Wright.
59	11	"Coulda, Woulda, Shoulda"	David Frankel	Jenny Bicks	August 5, 2001	411	5.87
Carrie is reluctant to tell Aidan that she had an abortion when she was 22. Charlotte discovers she only has a fifteen percent chance of getting pregnant naturally. Miranda finds out she's pregnant by Steve, and debates whether or not to keep the baby. Samantha gets Lucy Liu as a client and tries to use the relationship to her advantage.
60	12	"Just Say Yes"	David Frankel	Cindy Chupack	August 12, 2001	412	6.64
Aidan proposes to Carrie. Charlotte discusses adoption with Trey, but hits a wall when Bunny finds out that the baby could be Chinese. Miranda tells Steve she's having his baby. Samantha starts sleeping with her boss, Richard Wright.
61	13	"The Good Fight"	Charles McDougall	Michael Patrick King	January 6, 2002	413	7.30
Carrie and Aidan have a huge fight over the clutter in her apartment after Aidan moves in. Charlotte and Trey have a huge fight when he brings home a cardboard baby as a gag gift. Miranda goes on a date despite being pregnant. Samantha finally gives in to Richard's romantic overtures.
62	14	"All That Glitters"	Charles McDougall	Cindy Chupack	January 13, 2002	414	6.81
Carrie finds time away from stay-at-home boy Aidan with a gay Aussie shoe distributor at the exclusive Bungalow 8. Charlotte and Trey separate permanently after their apartment is photographed in House & Garden. Miranda accidentally outs her co-worker after he tells the office gossip that she's pregnant. Samantha tells Richard she loves him while high on ecstasy.
63	15	"Change of a Dress"	Alan Taylor	Julie Rottenberg & Elisa Zuritsky	January 20, 2002	415	5.02
Carrie freaks out about marrying Aidan. Charlotte takes tap classes, and has a meltdown during the "Tea for Two" number when she realizes she isn't ready to be alone after her divorce. Miranda must feign excitement when she learns her baby's sex. Samantha finds out Richard is seeing other women, and pushes him to be monogamous with her.
64	16	"Ring a Ding Ding"	Alan Taylor	Amy B. Harris	January 27, 2002	416	7.20
Carrie is forced to buy her apartment back from Aidan or move out. Mr. Big writes her a check as a loan, but she doesn't know whether she should accept it. Charlotte doesn't know what to do with her engagement ring. Miranda has to refurbish her wardrobe after gaining pregnancy weight. Samantha tries to trick Richard into saying he loves her.
65	17	"A 'Vogue' Idea"	Martha Coolidge	Allan Heinberg	February 3, 2002	417	4.34
Carrie starts working at Vogue and finds out from her acerbic editor that she doesn't have a Vogue idea about relationships. Charlotte throws a baby shower for Miranda, but Miranda gets fed up with her after she tries to make the shower too cutesy. Richard asks Samantha for a threesome with a 21-year-old for his birthday.
66	18	"I Heart NY"	Martha Coolidge	Michael Patrick King	February 10, 2002	418	7.39
Carrie is shocked to find out that Big is moving to Napa, California, and plans to give him a New York send-off. Charlotte begins dating another recent divorcé. Miranda gives birth to her baby, which she and Steve name Brady, after Steve's last name. Samantha suspects Richard may be cheating on her.

== Ratings ==
=== United States ===
No. in		Episode	Air date	Time slot (EST)	Household		Viewership		Ref
series	season	Episode	Air date	Time slot (EST)	Rating	Viewers (in millions)	in millions	Weekly rank	Ref
49	1	The Agony and the 'Ex'-tacy	June 3, 2001	Sundays; 9:00 pm	4.5	4.58	6.49	#1	
50	1	The Real Me	June 3, 2001	Sundays; 9:30 pm	4.1	4.17	5.93	#2	
51	3	Defining Moments	June 10, 2001	Sundays; 9:00 pm	3.6	3.69	5.48	#1	
52	4	What's Sex Got To Do With It?	June 17, 2001	Sundays; 9:00 pm	3.4	3.45	5.13	#1	
53	5	Ghost Town	June 24, 2001	Sundays; 9:00 pm	3.8	3.87	5.84	#1	
54	6	Baby, Talk is Cheap	July 1, 2001	Sundays; 9:00 pm	3.7	3.80	5.47	#1	
55	7	Time and Punishment	July 8, 2001	Sundays; 9:00 pm	4.0	4.05	5.59	#1	
56	8	My Motherboard, My Self	July 15, 2001	Sundays; 9:00 pm	3.6	3.70	5.37	#1	
57	9	Sex and the Country	July 22, 2001	Sundays; 9:00 pm	4.0	4.08	5.80	#1	
58	10	Belles of the Balls	July 29, 2001	Sundays; 9:00 pm	3.9	3.98	5.98	#1	
59	11	Coulda, Woulda, Shoulda	August 5, 2001	Sundays; 9:00 pm	4.0	4.06	5.87	#1	
60	12	Just Say Yes	August 12, 2001	Sundays; 9:00 pm	—N/a	—N/a	—N/a	—N/a	—N/a
61	13	The Good Fight	January 6, 2002	Sundays; 9:00 pm	4.7	4.97	7.30	#1	
62	14	All That Glitters	January 13, 2002	Sundays; 9:00 pm	4.2	4.47	6.81	#1	
63	15	Change of a Dress	January 20, 2002	Sundays; 9:00 pm	3.6	3.84	5.21	#1	
64	16	Ring A Ding Ding	January 27, 2002	Sundays; 9:00 pm	4.8	5.01	7.20	#1	
65	17	A 'Vogue' Idea	February 3, 2002	Sundays; 9:00 pm	3.0	3.15	4.34	#1	
66	18	I Heart NY	February 10, 2002	Sundays; 9:00 pm	4.9	5.16	7.39	#1	

=== United Kingdom ===
All viewing figures and ranks are sourced from BARB.

No. in		Episode	Air date	Time slot (EST)	Viewership	
series	season	Episode	Air date	Time slot (EST)	in millions	Weekly rank
49	1	The Agony and the 'Ex'-tacy	January 9, 2002	Wednesdays; 10:00 pm	2.84	#4
50	2	The Real Me	January 9, 2002	Wednesdays; 10:40 pm	2.47	#10
51	3	Defining Moments	January 16, 2002	Wednesdays; 10:00 pm	2.71	#8
52	4	What's Sex Got To Do With It?	January 16, 2002	Wednesdays; 10:40 pm	2.54	#14
53	5	Ghost Town	January 23, 2002	Wednesdays; 10:00 pm	3.14	#7
54	6	Baby, Talk is Cheap	January 23, 2002	Wednesdays; 10:40 pm	3.14	#8
55	7	Time and Punishment	January 30, 2002	Wednesdays; 10:00 pm	3.00	#5
56	8	My Motherboard, My Self	January 30, 2002	Wednesdays; 10:40 pm	3.03	#4
57	9	Sex and the Country	February 6, 2002	Wednesdays; 10:00 pm	3.18	#5
58	10	Belles of the Balls	February 6, 2002	Wednesdays; 10:40 pm	3.16	#6
59	11	Coulda, Woulda, Shoulda	February 13, 2002	Wednesdays; 10:00 pm	2.88	#4
60	12	Just Say Yes	February 13, 2002	Wednesdays; 10:40 pm	2.67	#9
61	13	The Good Fight	February 20, 2002	Wednesdays; 10:00 pm	2.85	#5
62	14	All That Glitters	February 20, 2002	Wednesdays; 10:40 pm	2.96	#4
63	15	Change of a Dress	February 27, 2002	Wednesdays; 10:00 pm	3.00	#4
64	16	Ring A Ding Ding	February 27, 2002	Wednesdays; 10:40 pm	3.12	#3
65	17	A 'Vogue' Idea	March 6, 2002	Wednesdays; 10:00 pm	3.05	#2
66	18	I Heart NY	March 6, 2002	Wednesdays; 10:40 pm	2.95	#3

== Home release ==
Sex and the City: The Complete Season 4
Set details		Special features
18 episodes; 3-disc set (DVD); 1.33:1 aspect ratio; Subtitles: English, French, Spanish; English: Dolby Surround Stereo; Spanish: Dolby Surround Stereo		Audio Commentary of 3 Episodes with Executive Producer Michael Patrick King; Biographies of cast and filmmakers; Episodic Previews
DVD release date
Region 1	Region 2	Region 4
May 20, 2003	May 12, 2008	October 2, 2008
