= Producers Guild of America Award for Best Non-Fiction Television =

- Awarded for: Outstanding Production of Non-Fiction Television
- Country: United States
- Presented by: Producers Guild of America
- First award: 2002
- Currently held by: Steve! (Martin) a documentary in 2 pieces (2024)

The Producers Guild of America Award for Outstanding Producer of Non-Fiction Television, previously called Outstanding Producer of Reality/Game/Informational Series Television (2002–2003), is an annual award given by the Producers Guild of America since 2002.

== Winners and nominees ==
=== 2000s ===
Year	Winners and nominees	Network	Ref.
2002 (14th)	Biography	A&E	
2002 (14th)	American Idol	Fox	
2002 (14th)	Frontline	PBS	
2002 (14th)	The Osbournes	MTV	
2002 (14th)	Project Greenlight	HBO	
2003 (15th)	Queer Eye for the Straight Guy	Bravo	
2003 (15th)	American Idol	Fox	
2003 (15th)	Biography	A&E	
2003 (15th)	Survivor	CBS	
2003 (15th)	The Amazing Race	CBS	
2003 (15th)	Project Greenlight	HBO	
2004 (16th)	The Amazing Race (season 5)	CBS	
2004 (16th)	Queer Eye for the Straight Guy	Bravo	
2004 (16th)	Inside the Actors Studio	Bravo	
2004 (16th)	The Apprentice	NBC	
2004 (16th)	Extreme Makeover: Home Edition	ABC	
2005 (17th)	60 Minutes	CBS	
2005 (17th)	Extreme Makeover: Home Edition	ABC	
2005 (17th)	30 Days	FX	
2005 (17th)	The Amazing Race (season 6)	CBS	
2005 (17th)	The Amazing Race (season 7)	CBS	
2006 (18th)	60 Minutes	CBS	
2006 (18th)	Dancing with the Stars	ABC	
2006 (18th)	The Amazing Race	CBS	
2006 (18th)	American Idol	Fox	
2006 (18th)	Project Runway	Bravo	
2007 (19th)	Planet Earth	BBC One	
2007 (19th)	60 Minutes	CBS	
2007 (19th)	Extreme Makeover: Home Edition	ABC	
2007 (19th)	Deadliest Catch	Discovery Channel	
2007 (19th)	Kathy Griffin: My Life on the D-List	Bravo	
2008 (20th)	60 Minutes	CBS	
2008 (20th)	Deadliest Catch	Discovery Channel	
2008 (20th)	Frontline	PBS	
2008 (20th)	Kathy Griffin: My Life on the D-List	Bravo	
2008 (20th)	This American Life	Showtime	
2009 (21st)	60 Minutes	CBS	
2009 (21st)	Deadliest Catch	Discovery Channel	
2009 (21st)	Intervention	A&E	
2009 (21st)	Kathy Griffin: My Life on the D-List	Bravo	
2009 (21st)	This American Life	Showtime	

=== 2010s ===
Year	Winners and nominees	Network	Ref.
2010 (22nd)	Deadliest Catch	Discovery Channel	
2010 (22nd)	Anthony Bourdain: No Reservations	Travel Channel	
2010 (22nd)	Intervention	A&E	
2010 (22nd)	Kathy Griffin: My Life on the D-List	Bravo	
2010 (22nd)	Undercover Boss	CBS	
2011 (23rd)	American Masters	PBS	
2011 (23rd)	30 for 30	ESPN	
2011 (23rd)	Anthony Bourdain: No Reservations	Travel Channel	
2011 (23rd)	Deadliest Catch	Discovery Channel	
2011 (23rd)	Undercover Boss	CBS	
2012 (24th)	American Masters	PBS	
2012 (24th)	Anthony Bourdain: No Reservations	Travel Channel	
2012 (24th)	Deadliest Catch	Discovery Channel	
2012 (24th)	Inside the Actors Studio	Bravo	
2012 (24th)	Shark Tank	ABC	
2013 (25th)	Anthony Bourdain: Parts Unknown	CNN	
2013 (25th)	30 for 30	ESPN	
2013 (25th)	Duck Dynasty	A&E	
2013 (25th)	Inside the Actors Studio	Bravo	
2013 (25th)	Shark Tank	ABC	
2014 (26th)	Cosmos: A Spacetime Odyssey	Fox/Nat Geo	
2014 (26th)	30 for 30	ESPN	
2014 (26th)	American Masters	PBS	
2014 (26th)	Anthony Bourdain: Parts Unknown	CNN	
2014 (26th)	Shark Tank	ABC	
2015 (27th)	The Jinx: The Life and Deaths of Robert Durst	HBO	
2015 (27th)	30 for 30 (season 6)	ESPN	
2015 (27th)	Anthony Bourdain: Parts Unknown (season 3)	CNN	
2015 (27th)	Shark Tank (season 6)	ABC	
2015 (27th)	Vice (season 3)	HBO	
2016 (28th)	Making a Murderer (season 1)	Netflix	
2016 (28th)	30 for 30 (season 7)	ESPN	
2016 (28th)	60 Minutes (seasons 48 & 49)	CBS	
2016 (28th)	Anthony Bourdain: Parts Unknown (seasons 5-8)	CNN	
2016 (28th)	Hamilton's America	PBS	
2017 (29th)	Leah Remini: Scientology and the Aftermath (seasons 1 & 2)	A&E	
2017 (29th)	30 for 30 (season 8)	ESPN	
2017 (29th)	60 Minutes (season 50)	CBS	
2017 (29th)	Anthony Bourdain: Parts Unknown (seasons 9 & 10)	CNN	
2017 (29th)	Spielberg	HBO	
2018 (30th)	Anthony Bourdain: Parts Unknown (season 11 & 12)	CNN	
2018 (30th)	30 for 30 (season 9)	ESPN	
2018 (30th)	Leah Remini: Scientology and the Aftermath (season 3)	A&E	
2018 (30th)	Queer Eye (seasons 1 & 2)	Netflix	
2018 (30th)	Wild Wild Country (season 1)	Netflix	
2019 (31st)	Leaving Neverland	HBO	
2019 (31st)	30 for 30 (season 10)	ESPN	
2019 (31st)	60 Minutes (seasons 51 & 52)	CBS	
2019 (31st)	Queer Eye (seasons 3 & 4)	Netflix	
2019 (31st)	Surviving R. Kelly	Lifetime	

=== 2020s ===
Year	Winners and nominees	Network	Ref.
2020 (32nd)	The Last Dance (season 1)	ESPN	
2020 (32nd)	60 Minutes (season 53)	CBS	
2020 (32nd)	Laurel Canyon	Epix	
2020 (32nd)	McMillions (season 1)	HBO	
2020 (32nd)	Tiger King	Netflix	
2021 (33rd)	The Beatles: Get Back (season 1)	Disney+	
2021 (33rd)	60 Minutes (season 54)	CBS	
2021 (33rd)	Allen v. Farrow (season 1)	HBO	
2021 (33rd)	Queer Eye (season 6)	Netflix	
2021 (33rd)	Stanley Tucci: Searching for Italy (season 1)	CNN	
2022 (34th)	Stanley Tucci: Searching for Italy	CNN	
2022 (34th)	30 for 30	ESPN	
2022 (34th)	60 Minutes	CBS	
2022 (34th)	George Carlin's American Dream	HBO	
2022 (34th)	Lucy and Desi	Amazon	
2023 (35th)	Welcome to Wrexham	FX	
2023 (35th)	60 Minutes	CBS	
2023 (35th)	The 1619 Project	Hulu	
2023 (35th)	Albert Brooks: Defending My Life	HBO	
2023 (35th)	Being Mary Tyler Moore	HBO	
2024 (36th)	Steve! (Martin) a documentary in 2 pieces	Apple TV+	
2024 (36th)	30 for 30	ESPN	
2024 (36th)	Conan O'Brien Must Go	Max	
2024 (36th)	The Jinx: Part Two	HBO	
2024 (36th)	Welcome to Wrexham	FX	

== Total awards by network ==
- CBS – 5
- CNN – 3
- A&E – 2
- HBO – 2
- PBS – 2
- Apple TV+ – 1
- BBC One – 1
- Bravo – 1
- Discovery Channel – 1
- Disney+ – 1
- ESPN - 1
- Fox – 1
- FX – 1
- Nat Geo – 1
- Netflix – 1

== Programs with multiple awards ==
4 awards

- 60 Minutes (2 consecutive)

2 awards

- American Masters (consecutive)
- Anthony Bourdain: Parts Unknown

== Programs with multiple nominations ==
12 nominations

- 60 Minutes

10 nominations

- 30 for 30

6 nominations

- Anthony Bourdain: Parts Unknown
- Deadliest Catch

5 nominations

- The Amazing Race

4 nominations

- Kathy Griffin: My Life on the D-List
- Shark Tank

3 nominations

- American Idol
- American Masters
- Anthony Bourdain: No Reservations
- Extreme Makeover: Home Edition
- Queer Eye
- Inside the Actors Studio
- Undercover Boss

2 nominations

- Biography
- Frontline
- Intervention
- The Jinx
- Leah Remini: Scientology and the Aftermath
- Project Greenlight
- Queer Eye for the Straight Guy
- Stanley Tucci: Searching for Italy
- This American Life
- Welcome to Wrexham
