= Producers Guild of America Award for Best Limited Series Television =

Annual award given by the Producers Guild of America

- Awarded for: Outstanding Production of Limited Series Television
- Country: United States
- Presented by: Producers Guild of America
- First award: 2018
- Currently held by: Baby Reindeer (2024)

The Producers Guild of America Award for Best Limited or Anthology Series Television, also known as the David L. Wolper Award for Outstanding Producer of Limited or Anthology Series Television, is an annual award given by the Producers Guild of America. It was first awarded at the 30th Annual Producers Guild Awards after the guild announced to split the award for Outstanding Producer of Long-Form Television into two: this accolade and the award for Outstanding Producer of Streamed or Televised Movies.

== Winners and nominees ==
=== 2010s ===
Year	Winners and nominees	Network	Ref.
2018 (30th)	The Assassination of Gianni Versace: American Crime Story	FX	
2018 (30th)	Escape at Dannemora	Showtime	
2018 (30th)	Maniac	Netflix	
2018 (30th)	The Romanoffs	Amazon Prime Video	
2018 (30th)	Sharp Objects	HBO	
2019 (31st)	Chernobyl	HBO	
2019 (31st)	Fosse/Verdon	FX	
2019 (31st)	True Detective	HBO	
2019 (31st)	Unbelievable	Netflix	
2019 (31st)	When They See Us	Netflix	

=== 2020s ===
Year	Winners and nominees	Network	Ref.
2020 (32nd)	The Queen's Gambit	Netflix	
2020 (32nd)	I May Destroy You	HBO	
2020 (32nd)	Normal People	Hulu	
2020 (32nd)	The Undoing	HBO	
2020 (32nd)	Unorthodox	Netflix	
2021 (33rd)	Mare of Easttown	HBO	
2021 (33rd)	Dopesick	Hulu	
2021 (33rd)	The Underground Railroad	Amazon	
2021 (33rd)	WandaVision	Disney+	
2021 (33rd)	The White Lotus	HBO	
2022 (34th)	The Dropout	Hulu	
2022 (34th)	Dahmer – Monster: The Jeffrey Dahmer Story	Netflix	
2022 (34th)	Inventing Anna	Netflix	
2022 (34th)	Obi-Wan Kenobi	Disney+	
2022 (34th)	Pam & Tommy	Hulu	
2023 (35th)	Beef	Netflix	
2023 (35th)	All the Light We Cannot See	Netflix	
2023 (35th)	Daisy Jones & the Six	Prime Video	
2023 (35th)	Fargo	FX	
2023 (35th)	Lessons in Chemistry	Apple TV+	
2024 (36th)	Baby Reindeer	Netflix	
2024 (36th)	Feud: Capote vs. The Swans	FX	
2024 (36th)	The Penguin	HBO	
2024 (36th)	Ripley	Netflix	
2024 (36th)	True Detective: Night Country	HBO	
2025 (37th)	Adolescence	Netflix	
2025 (37th)	The Beast in Me	Netflix	
2025 (37th)	Black Mirror	Netflix	
2025 (37th)	Black Rabbit	Netflix	
2025 (37th)	Dying for Sex	FX on Hulu	

== Total awards by network ==
- Netflix – 4
- HBO – 2
- FX – 1
- Hulu – 1

== Total nominations by network ==
- Netflix – 14
- HBO – 9
- FX – 5
- Hulu – 4
- Amazon Prime Video – 3
- Disney+ – 2
- Apple TV+ – 1
- Showtime – 1
