= Producers Guild of America Award for Best Streamed or Televised Movie =

- Awarded for: Outstanding Production of Streamed or Televised Movies
- Country: United States
- Presented by: Producers Guild of America
- First award: 2018
- Currently held by: John Candy: I Like Me (2025)

The Producers Guild of America Award for Best Streamed or Televised Movie, also known as the Award for Outstanding Producer of Streamed or Televised Movies, is an annual award given by the Producers Guild of America. It was first awarded at the 30th Annual Producers Guild Awards after the guild announced to split the award for Outstanding Producer of Long-Form Television into two: this accolade and the David L. Wolper Award for Outstanding Producer of Limited Series Television.

== Winners and nominees ==
=== 2010s ===
Year	Winners and nominees	Network	Ref.
2018 (30th)	Fahrenheit 451	HBO	
2018 (30th)	King Lear	Amazon Prime Video	
2018 (30th)	My Dinner with Hervé	HBO	
2018 (30th)	Paterno	HBO	
2018 (30th)	Sense8: Together Until the End	Netflix	
2019 (31st)	Apollo: Missions to the Moon	Nat Geo	
2019 (31st)	American Son	Netflix	
2019 (31st)	Black Mirror (Episode: "Striking Vipers")	Netflix	
2019 (31st)	Deadwood: The Movie	HBO	
2019 (31st)	El Camino: A Breaking Bad Movie	Netflix	

=== 2020s ===
Year	Winners and nominees	Network	Ref.
2020 (32nd)	Hamilton	Disney+	
2020 (32nd)	Bad Education	HBO	
2020 (32nd)	Christmas on the Square	Netflix	
2020 (32nd)	Jane Goodall: The Hope	Nat Geo	
2020 (32nd)	What the Constitution Means to Me	Prime Video	
2021 (33rd)	Tom Petty, Somewhere You Feel Free: The Making of Wildflowers	YouTube	
2021 (33rd)	8-Bit Christmas	HBO Max	
2021 (33rd)	Come from Away	Apple TV+	
2021 (33rd)	Oslo	HBO	
2021 (33rd)	Robin Roberts Presents: Mahalia	Lifetime	
2021 (33rd)	Single All the Way	Netflix	
2022 (34th)	Weird: The Al Yankovic Story	The Roku Channel	
2022 (34th)	Fire Island	Hulu	
2022 (34th)	Hocus Pocus 2	Disney+	
2022 (34th)	Pinocchio	Disney+	
2022 (34th)	Prey	Hulu	
2023 (35th)	Black Mirror: Beyond the Sea	Netflix	
2023 (35th)	Mr. Monk's Last Case: A Monk Movie	Peacock	
2023 (35th)	Quiz Lady	Hulu	
2023 (35th)	Reality	HBO	
2023 (35th)	Red, White & Royal Blue	Prime Video	
2024 (36th)	The Greatest Night in Pop	Netflix	
2024 (36th)	Carry-On	Netflix	
2024 (36th)	The Killer	Peacock	
2024 (36th)	Rebel Ridge	Netflix	
2024 (36th)	Unfrosted	Netflix	

== Total awards by network ==
- Netflix – 1
- Disney+ – 1
- HBO – 1
- Nat Geo – 1
- The Roku Channel – 1
- YouTube – 1

== Total nominations by network ==
- Netflix – 11
- HBO – 7
- Disney+ – 3
- Hulu – 3
- Prime Video – 3
- Nat Geo – 2
- Peacock – 2
- Apple TV+ – 1
- HBO Max – 1
- Lifetime – 1
- The Roku Channel – 1
- YouTube – 1
