= 12th Golden Laurel Awards =

12th Annual Golden Laurel Awards
- Date: March 3, 2001
- Location: The Century Plaza Hotel, Los Angeles, California
- Country: United States
- Presented by: Producers Guild of America

Highlights
- Best Producer(s) Motion Picture: Gladiator – Branko Lustig and Douglas Wick

The 12th Golden Laurel Awards (also known as 2001 Golden Laurel Awards), honoring the best film and television producers of 2000, were held at The Century Plaza Hotel in Los Angeles, California on March 3, 2001. The nominees were announced on January 10, 2001.

== Winners and nominees ==
=== Film ===
Darryl F. Zanuck Award for Outstanding Producer of Theatrical Motion Pictures
- Gladiator – Branko Lustig and Douglas Wick
  - Almost Famous
  - Billy Elliot
  - Crouching Tiger, Hidden Dragon
  - Erin Brockovich

=== Television ===
Norman Felton Award for Outstanding Producer of Episodic Television, Drama
- The West Wing
  - ER
  - Law & Order
  - Oz
  - The Practice
Outstanding Producer of Episodic Television, Comedy
- Sex and the City
  - Ally McBeal
  - Frasier
  - Friends
  - Will & Grace
David L. Wolper Award for Outstanding Producer of Long-Form Television
- Death of a Salesman
  - Fail Safe
  - If These Walls Could Talk 2
  - Nuremberg
  - Walking with Dinosaurs

=== David O. Selznick Lifetime Achievement Award in Theatrical Motion Pictures ===
- Brian Grazer

=== David Susskind Lifetime Achievement Award in Television ===
- David E. Kelley

=== Milestone Award ===
- Kirk Douglas

=== New Media Award ===
- Bruce Leak

=== New Technology Award ===
- Sidney Lumet

=== Nova Award for Most Promising Producer ===
- Theatrical Motion Pictures: Greg Brenman and Jonathan Finn for Billy Elliot
- Television: Linwood Boomer for Malcolm in the Middle

=== PGA Hall of Fame ===
- Theatrical Motion Pictures: It Happened One Night and Lawrence of Arabia
- Television: The Andy Griffith Show and The Honeymooners

=== Vision Award ===
- Theatrical Motion Pictures: Fantasia 2000
- Television: CSI: Crime Scene Investigation
