= Sex and the City season 5 =

Season of American television series

Sex and the City
- Season 5
- Promotional poster
- No. of episodes: 8

Release
- Original network: HBO
- Original release: July 21 – September 8, 2002

Season chronology
- ← Previous; Season 4 Next → Season 6

The fifth season of the American television romantic comedy-drama Sex and the City aired in the United States on HBO. The show was created by Darren Star while Star, Michael Patrick King, John P. Melfi, series lead actress Sarah Jessica Parker, Cindy Chupack, and Jenny Bicks served as executive producers. The series was produced by Darren Star Productions, HBO Original Programming, and Warner Bros. Television. Parker portrays the lead character Carrie Bradshaw, while Kim Cattrall, Kristin Davis and Cynthia Nixon played her best friends Samantha Jones, Charlotte York, and Miranda Hobbes.

In season five, Carrie, in the midst of a dating hiatus, lands a publishing deal for her column and begins a relationship with a fellow writer. Miranda becomes a mother with Steve and struggles to manage a job, dating life and her friendships with the other girls. Samantha dates Richard again but battles with trust issues stemming from his infidelity. A recently divorced Charlotte gets into a legal battle with Trey's mother over their apartment and, after the legal proceedings, falls in love with her lawyer.

The fifth season aired on Sunday nights at 9:00 PM from July 21, 2002 to September 8, 2002 and comprised eight episodes, as opposed to the original 18 episode order, due to Parker's pregnancy at the time of filming. In the United Kingdom, the season was broadcast on Wednesday nights between January 1 and February 19, 2003. The season received mixed to positive critical responses while receiving several awards and nominations, including winning the Golden Globe Award for Best Supporting Actress – Series, Miniseries or Television Film for Cattrall. The season averaged over 7 million viewers.

== Production ==
The fifth season of Sex and the City was produced by Darren Star Productions and Warner Bros. Television, in association with HBO Original Programming. The series is based on the book of the same name, written by Candice Bushnell, which contains stories from her column with the New York Observer. The show featured production from Antonia Ellis, Jane Raab and series star Sarah Jessica Parker, also an executive producer alongside Michael Patrick King, John Melfi, Cindy Chupack, and Jenny Bicks. Episodic writers returning for the fifth season included Bicks, Chupack, King, Julie Rottenberg, and Elisa Zuritsky. New writers enlisted for the season included Alexa Junge and Judy Toll. The season was directed by returning directors King, Charles McDougall, John David Coles, and Michael Engler.

== Cast and characters ==
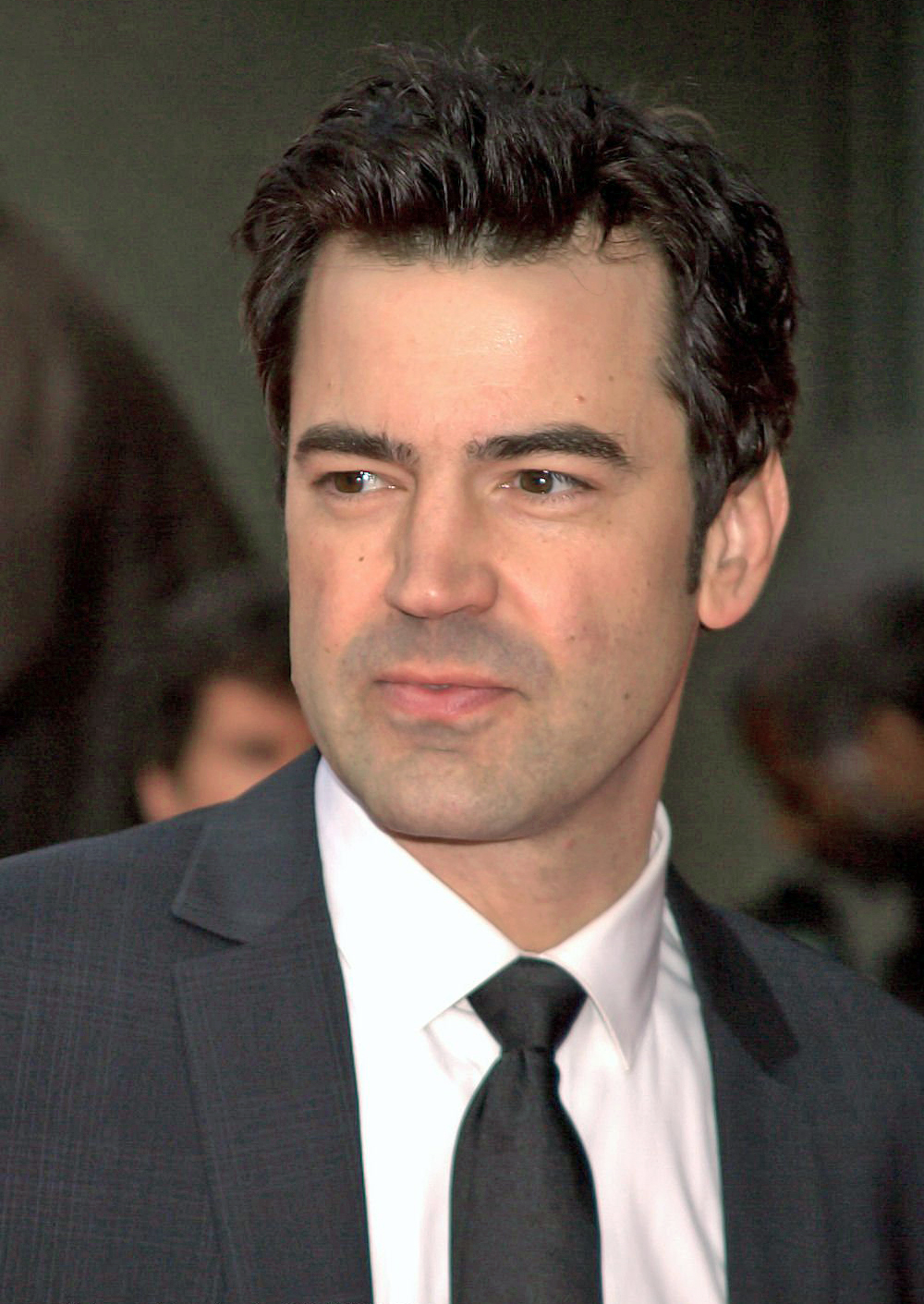
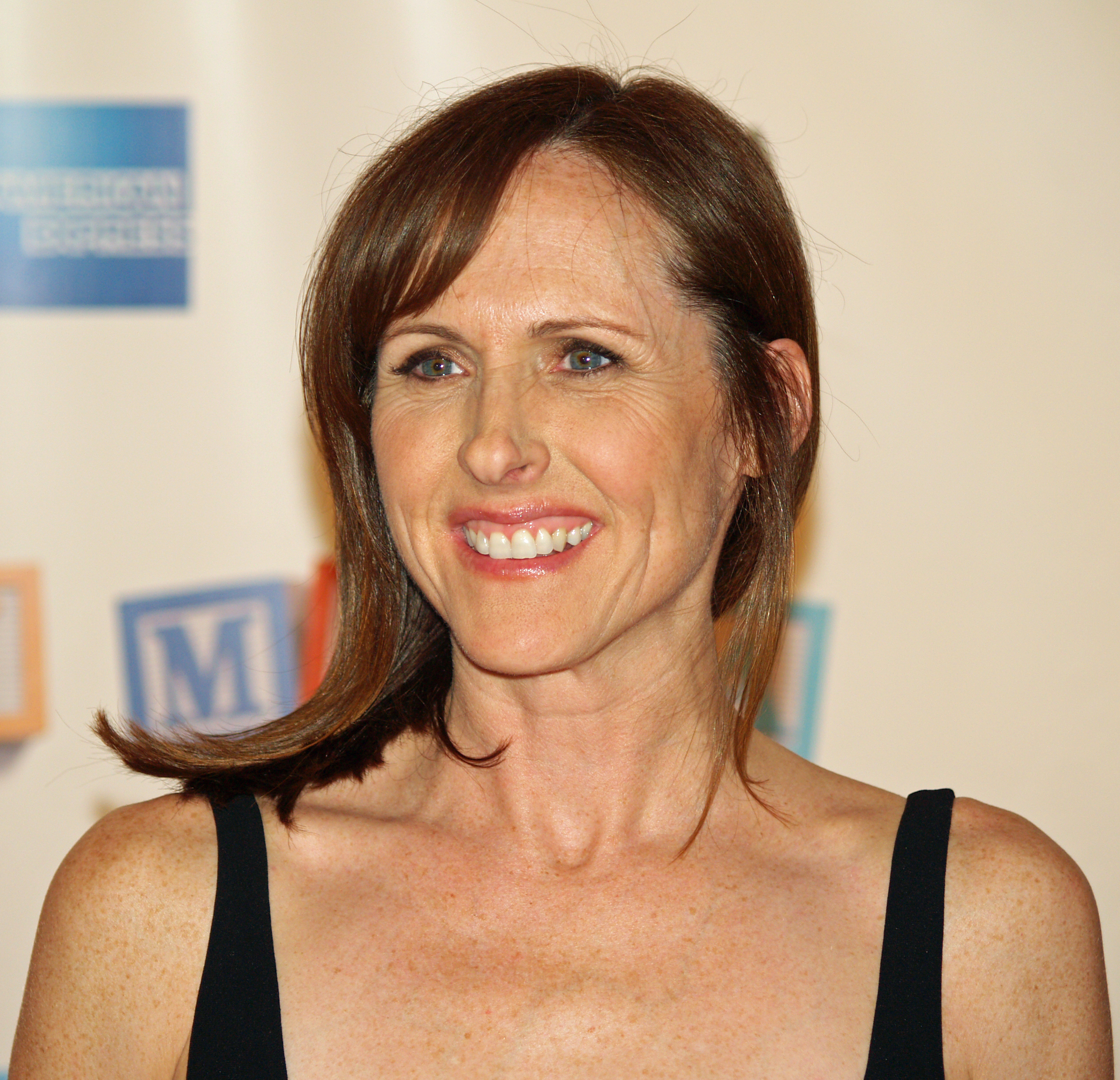
The fifth season featured guest appearances from celebrities such as Ron Livingston and Molly Shannon.

Like the previous seasons, season five features the same principal cast and characters. Sarah Jessica Parker portrays Carrie Bradshaw, a fashionable 36-year old woman who writes about sex and life in New York City in her column, "Sex and the City", with the fictional New York Star. Kim Cattrall played the promiscuous public relations agent Samantha Jones. Kristin Davis portrayed Charlotte York MacDougal, an optimistic, straight-laced former art curator navigating being newly single while moving on from her failed marriage. Cynthia Nixon acted as the acerbic and sarcastic lawyer Miranda Hobbes, who faces struggles as a working mother.

The fifth season featured a number of recurring and guest actors whose characters contributed significantly to the series' plotlines. Chris Noth reprised his role as Mr. Big for one episode this season. David Eigenberg portrayed Miranda's on-off boyfriend, bar owner and father of her child Steve Brady. Willie Garson played entertainment manager and Carrie's gay friend Stanford Blatch. Mario Cantone returns to the series as a recurring guest actor, portraying Charlotte's gay friend and former wedding planner Anthony Marantino. Frances Sternhagen reprised her role as Trey's overbearing and intrusive mother Bunny MacDougal. James Remar reprised his role as hotelier and Samantha's boyfriend Richard Wright. Lynn Cohen reprises her role as Magda, Miranda's foreign housekeeper. Comedian Molly Shannon recurs as Lily Martin while Ron Livingston appears as Jack Berger, a professional writer.

== Reception ==
=== Viewership and ratings ===
Season five of Sex and the City debuted on July 21, 2002, at 9:00 p.m. Eastern Time Zone with the episode "Anchors Away". The episode was viewed by 7.93 million people, becoming the most-watched episode of the series at the time. It earned a 4.8 Nielsen household rating, indicative of 5.07 million households in which the episode was viewed. Viewership for the season fluctuated up and down between 5.95 million and 7.93 million viewers, but ranked number one among pay cable programs every week. The season finale, "I Love a Charade", premiered on September 8, 2002, to an audience of 7.33 million viewers. Earning a 4.7 household rating, the episode was viewed by 5.04 million households. The fifth season averaged over 7 million viewers per 8 episodes. In the United Kingdom, the season aired on Channel 4, garnering high ratings and landing among the top 30 programs of the week.

=== Critical reviews ===
Mike Long of DVD Talk gave the season 4.5 out of 5 stars, highlighting the season's plotlines and dialogue despite its shortened length. Bryan Buyn of DVD Verdict found the series at this point to be pandering to the public, criticizing the continued focus on the four girls "chasing "cute boys" and blathering endlessly over breakfast about sex, relationships, and sex." Buyn, however, stated that the criticism "stems from the fact that the show is just good enough to make me wish it were better", and offered praise for the leading actresses' performance. Dan Jewel, writing for Media Life Magazine, praised the series for portraying Miranda's motherhood honestly and for giving the characters more depth, noting that the show walks a "fine line" between poignancy and mawkishness.

== Awards and nominations ==
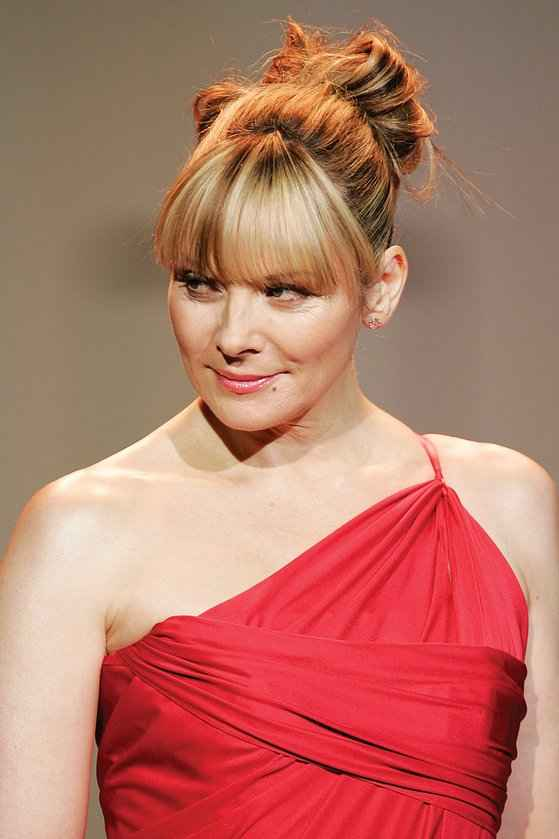
Kim Cattrall, after receiving several award nominations, won the Golden Globe Award for Best Supporting Actress – Series, Miniseries or Television Film

At the 60th Golden Globe Awards, Kim Cattrall won the award for Best Supporting Actress – Series, Miniseries or Television Film. Co-star Cynthia Nixon also received a nomination for Best Supporting Actress – Series, Miniseries or Television Film while Sarah Jessica Parker received a nomination for a Best Actress – Television Series Musical or Comedy. The series was nominated for the award for Best Television Series – Musical or Comedy for the fifth consecutive year, but lost out to Curb Your Enthusiasm.

At the 55th Primetime Emmy Awards, Sex and the City received 12 nominations and won Outstanding Casting for a Comedy Series. Sarah Jessica Parker was nominated for Outstanding Lead Actress in a Comedy Series for the fifth time. Kim Cattrall and Cynthia Nixon were both nominated for Outstanding Supporting Actress in a Comedy Series Emmy, being Cattrall's fourth nomination and Nixon's second. "Plus One is the Loneliest Number" received two nominations: Outstanding Hairstyling for a Series and Outstanding Makeup for a Series (Non-Prosthetic). The episode "I Love a Charade" was nominated for awards for Outstanding Costumes for a Series, Outstanding Directing for a Comedy Series and Outstanding Writing for a Comedy Series.

Chris Noth and Nixon received nominations for Best Supporting Actor and Actress – Television Series at the 7th Golden Satellite Awards. At the 2003 American Cinema Editors Awards, Wendey Stanzler won the award for Best Edited Half-Hour Series for Television. Patricia Field was nominated for award for Best Costume Design – Contemporary TV Series at the 2003 Costume Designers Guild Awards. At the 55th Directors Guild of America Awards, Michael Patrick King was nominated for the award for Outstanding Directing – Comedy Series for "Plus is the Loneliest Number". At the 2002 Writers Guild of America Awards, three episodes from the fifth season were nominated for Best Episodic Comedy. Series producers Cindy Chupack, King, John P. Melfi, and Parker were nominated for the award for Producers Guild of America Award for Best Episodic Comedy. At the 9th Screen Actors Guild Awards, Cattrall was nominated for Outstanding Performance by a Female Actor in a Comedy Series while the cast was nominated for Outstanding Performance by an Ensemble in a Comedy Series.

== Episodes ==
No. overall	No. in season	Title	Directed by	Written by	Original release date	Prod. code	U.S. viewers (millions)
67	1	"Anchors Away"	Charles McDougall	Michael Patrick King	July 21, 2002	501	7.93
Carrie realizes her relationship with New York City is as dysfunctional as her relationship with men. Charlotte decides she needs to distance herself from her former life as "Mrs. MacDougal". Miranda tries to adjust to her new life with Brady. Samantha gets phone calls from Richard begging her to take him back. This episode — the first to be filmed after the events of September 11, 2001 — is based upon the New York City tradition of Fleet Week, when the US Navy docks in the city in the last week of May. The use of this element, as well as the metaphors about Carrie's relationship with the city, was intended "to acknowledge the [9/11] events subtly," according to showrunner Michael Patrick King. Featured music is the American traditional "Anchors Aweigh", "The Avenue" by Bona Fide, "Shining Star" by Earth, Wind, and Fire, "Feelin' Alright" by Joe Cocker, "Can't Get Next To You" by Al Green and "Try A Little Tenderness" by Otis Redding.
68	2	"Unoriginal Sin"	Charles McDougall	Cindy Chupack	July 28, 2002	502	6.63
Carrie gets an offer from a publisher who wants to make a book out of her column. Charlotte takes a self-help seminar and takes affirmations to try to find love again. Miranda agrees to have Brady baptized, and chooses Carrie as the godmother. Samantha takes Richard back, despite the girls advising against it.
69	3	"Luck Be an Old Lady"	John David Coles	Julie Rottenberg & Elisa Zuritsky	August 4, 2002	503	6.59
Carrie desperately tries to get everyone together for Charlotte's "thirty-faux" birthday. Charlotte doesn't want to turn 36 because she feels she's getting old. Miranda goes to Atlantic City with the girls, feeling self-conscious about her weight. Samantha is paranoid that Richard is cheating with the entire female hotel staff.
70	4	"Cover Girl"	John David Coles	Judy Toll & Michael Patrick King	August 11, 2002	504	7.31
Carrie works with publicist Samantha to try to get the perfect look for her book cover. Charlotte starts reading self-help books. Miranda goes to Weight Watchers to lose her baby weight. Samantha gets upset when she feels the girls are judging her outrageous sex life.
71	5	"Plus One Is the Loneliest Number"	Michael Patrick King	Cindy Chupack	August 18, 2002	505	6.95
Carrie invites Jack Berger to her book opening party, which turns out to be a huge event. Charlotte butts heads with Bunny MacDougal regarding her divorce demands. Miranda's single life and her life with Brady conflict. Samantha gets an impulse-buy chemical peel that goes awry.
72	6	"Critical Condition"	Michael Patrick King	Alexa Junge	August 25, 2002	506	7.38
Carrie deals with her past with Aidan when she runs into Nina Katz, who had dated Aidan after he and Carrie split up. Charlotte switches divorce lawyers to go up against Bunny in a fight to keep her apartment. Miranda has no one to turn to when she needs help taking care of Brady. Samantha tries to return a spent vibrator, then spends some of her free time on Miranda.
73	7	"The Big Journey"	Michael Engler	Michael Patrick King	September 1, 2002	507	5.95
Carrie goes to San Francisco to promote her book and visit Big. Charlotte settles her divorce and sleeps with her unappealing (to her) divorce lawyer, Harry Goldenblatt. Samantha accompanies Carrie to California, looking for a good time.
74	8	"I Love a Charade"	Michael Engler	Cindy Chupack & Michael Patrick King	September 8, 2002	508	7.33
The girls attend the Hamptons wedding of an over-the-hill socialite and a lounge singer (Nathan Lane) whom they all thought was gay. Carrie encounters Jack Berger again. Charlotte goes public with her relationship with Harry. Miranda gets more comfortable with the baby and with her role as a mother. Samantha throws a huge party at Richard Wright's Hamptons house.

== Ratings ==
=== United States ===
No. in		Episode	Air date	Time slot (EST)	Household		Viewership		Ref
series	season	Episode	Air date	Time slot (EST)	Rating	Viewers (in millions)	in millions	Weekly rank	Ref
67	1	Anchors Away	July 21, 2002	Sundays; 9:00 pm	4.8	5.07	7.93	#1	
68	2	Unoriginal Sin	July 28, 2002	Sundays; 9:00 pm	4.4	4.68	6.63	#1	
69	3	Luck Be an Old Lady	August 4, 2002	Sundays; 9:00 pm	4.3	4.55	6.59	#1	
70	4	Cover Girl	August 11, 2002	Sundays; 9:00 pm	4.9	5.14	7.31	#1	
71	5	Plus One is the Loneliest Number	August 18, 2002	Sundays; 9:00 pm	4.5	4.72	6.95	#1	
72	6	Critical Condition	August 25, 2002	Sundays; 9:00 pm	4.9	5.18	7.38	#1	
73	7	The Big Journey	September 1, 2002	Sundays; 9:00 pm	4.0	4.26	5.95	#1	
74	8	I Love a Charade	September 8, 2002	Sundays; 9:00 pm	4.7	5.04	7.33	#1	

=== United Kingdom ===
All viewing figures and ranks are sourced from BARB.

No. in		Episode	Air date	Time slot (EST)	Viewership	
series	season	Episode	Air date	Time slot (EST)	in millions	Weekly rank
67	1	Anchors Away	January 1, 2003	Wednesdays; 10:00 pm	2.23	#11
68	2	Unoriginal Sin	January 8, 2003	Wednesdays; 10:00 pm	3.01	#10
69	3	Luck Be an Old Lady	January 15, 2003	Wednesdays; 10:30 pm	2.41	#15
70	4	Cover Girl	January 22, 2003	Wednesdays; 10:30 pm	2.58	#15
71	5	Plus One is the Loneliest Number	January 29, 2003	Wednesdays; 10:30 pm	2.19	#21
72	6	Critical Condition	February 5, 2003	Wednesdays; 10:30 pm	2.50	#15
73	7	The Big Journey	February 12, 2003	Wednesdays; 10:30 pm	2.47	#10
74	8	I Love a Charade	February 19, 2003	Wednesdays; 10:30 pm	2.15	#22

== Home release ==
Sex and the City: The Complete Season 5
Set details		Special features
8 episodes; 2-disc set (DVD); 1.33:1 aspect ratio; Subtitles: English, French, Spanish; English: Dolby Surround 5.1, Dolby Surround Stereo; Spanish: Stereo		Audio commentary on "Anchors Aways", "Plus One is the Loneliest Number" and "I Love a Charade" by Michael Patrick King; Episodic Previews; 22 minute "Behind The Seams" featurette with Costume Designer Patricia Field on haute couture to downtown style; Sex and the City Interactive Trivia Game (30 Questions)
DVD release date
Region 1	Region 2	Region 4
December 30, 2003	November 17, 2003	October 2, 2008
