= Fred Baron (producer) =

American film producer

Fred Baron is an American film producer and studio executive who currently serves as executive vice president of feature production at 20th Century Fox.

== Biography ==
Baron was raised in Manhattan, son of two movie fans who would go as far as driving to Connecticut to see new pictures. He would inherit this appreciation for cinema, going as far as screening 16 mm films he got from a neighbor who worked at Paramount Pictures in his basement.

Baron received his Bachelor of Arts degree from Ohio Wesleyan University in 1976, majoring in English Literature. He also studied criticism at St. Clare's College, in Oxford, England. After leaving college, Baron went to Los Angeles to enter the movie industry, living in Malibu with a friend who was going to USC Film School. After a few months in LA, he got a job at Bullock's and eventually began his movie career in the mailroom at Universal Studios. After he met Lauren Shuler, a young producer who had gotten a job to run the West Coast Division of Martin Poll Productions, he decided to become a runner for Shuler. He became a production assistant on the first film made by the company, 1981's Nighthawks. Afterward, he worked on Continental Divide, where he met both his wife and producer Bill Badalato, who hired Baron as his assistant. Then Baron did varied jobs: location coordinator for The Man with Two Brains, Badalato's assistant in Top Gun, production assistant for Weeds, production associate on 1969, and first assistant director on Stand Alone.

In 1990, Baron worked as a producer and executive at HBO Pictures, where he helped develop the TV series Tales from the Crypt. Then he got a job at 20th Century Fox through his producer friend Tom Jacobson, who became executive vice-president of the studio and introduced Baron to Jon Landau. Then Baron supervised successful projects such as The Last of the Mohicans, Edward Scissorhands, Hot Shots!, Broken Arrow, and Bulworth.

When Baron renegotiated his contract in the late 1990s, he negotiated a right to produce as well. After some invitations, he accepted Baz Luhrmann's call to produce Moulin Rouge!, and stepped down from his executive job to spend three years (1999–2001) working on the film. Moulin Rouge! was successful, earning Baron a Darryl F. Zanuck Producer of the Year Award from the Producers Guild of America and an Academy Award nomination for Best Picture. Baron then returned to his job at Fox, overseeing aspects of Moulin Rouge! as well as prepping new features for the studio. In 2002, he was promoted to executive vice president of Feature Production. Baron's most common task in his job is contacting production teams spread around the globe, as "We travel the world to find the best locations to make our films as cost-effective as possible," given Fox's politics of producing tent pole films at smaller budgets compared to other major film studios.

Baron helped create the PGA Green Initiative, which advocates for green politics and sustainable filmmaking, and won a prize at the 2011 Environmental Media Awards. In 2011, Governor of California Arnold Schwarzenegger appointed him for the California Film Commission, which aims to keep film and television industry projects in the state.
