= Nicole Avril =

French writer

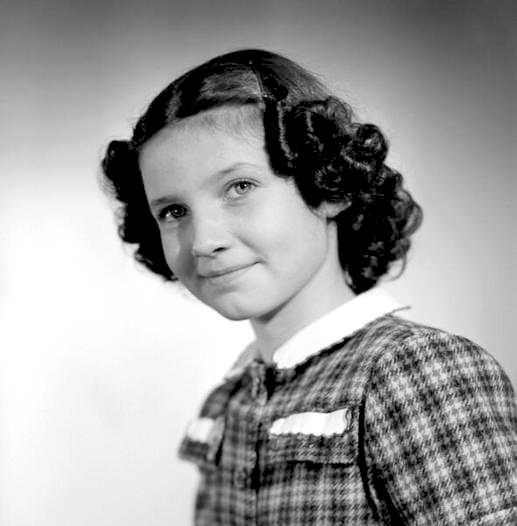
- Born: 15 August 1939 (age 86); Rambouillet, France
- Occupations: actress; model; writer

Nicole Avril (born 15 August 1939 in Rambouillet) is a French academic, actress, model, and writer.

== Works ==
=== Novels ===
- Dernière mise en scène (Plon et Pocket 2005)
- Le Regard de la grenouille (Plon 2003, Pocket 2005)
- Contes pour rêver (Piccolia 2001)
- Le Roman du visage (Plon 2000)
- Le Roman d’un inconnu (Grasset 1998)
- Une Personne déplacée (Grasset 1996, LGF-Livre de Poche 1998)
- Il y a longtemps que je t’aime (Flammarion 1991, J’ai Lu 1993)
- Sur la peau du diable (Flammarion 1987, J'ai Lu 1989)
- La Première alliance (Flammarion 1986, J'ai Lu 1987)
- Jeanne (Flammarion 1984, J'ai Lu 1985)
- La Disgrâce (Albin Michel 1980, J'ai Lu 1982)
- Monsieur de Lyon (Albin Michel 1979, J'ai Lu 1980)
- Le Jardin des absents (Albin Michel 1977 Livre de poche 1979)
- Les Remparts d’Adrien (Albin Michel 1975), taken from a TV film she wrote
- Les Gens de Misar (Albin Michel 1972), Prix des Quatre-Jurys
- L’Eté de la Saint-Valentin (Pauvert 1972, Livre de poche 1975)

=== Others ===
- Moi, Dora Maar (Plon 2002, Pocket 2003)
- L’Impératrice (Grasset 1993, Livre de Poche 1995), fictionalized biography of Elisabeth of Austria, ISBN 2253137308
- Dans les jardins de mon père (Flammarion 1989, J’ai Lu 1991), autobiographical story
- Taisez-vous, Elkabbach ! (Flammarion, 1982), co-written with her husband Jean-Pierre Elkabbach
