= 30th Producers Guild of America Awards =

30th Annual Producers Guild Awards
- Date: January 19, 2019
- Location: The Beverly Hilton, Beverly Hills, California
- Country: United States
- Presented by: Producers Guild of America

Highlights
- Best Producer(s) Motion Picture: Green Book – Jim Burke, Charles B. Wessler, Brian Hayes Currie, Peter Farrelly, and Nick Vallelonga
- Best Producer(s) Animated Feature: Spider-Man: Into the Spider-Verse – Avi Arad, Phil Lord, Christopher Miller, Amy Pascal, and Christina Steinberg
- Best Producer(s) Documentary Motion Picture: Won't You Be My Neighbor? – Morgan Neville, Nicholas Ma, and Caryn Capotosto

The 30th Producers Guild of America Awards (also known as 2019 Producers Guild Awards), honoring the best film and television producers of 2018, were held at The Beverly Hilton in Beverly Hills, California on January 19, 2019. The nominations in the documentary category were announced on November 20, 2018 and the other nominations for film and television were announced on January 4, 2019.

== Winners and nominees ==
=== Film ===
Darryl F. Zanuck Award for Outstanding Producer of Theatrical Motion Pictures
- Green Book – Jim Burke, Charles B. Wessler, Brian Hayes Currie, Peter Farrelly, and Nick Vallelonga
  - Black Panther – Kevin Feige
  - BlacKkKlansman – Sean McKittrick, Jason Blum, Raymond Mansfield, Jordan Peele, and Spike Lee
  - Bohemian Rhapsody – Graham King
  - Crazy Rich Asians – Nina Jacobson, Brad Simpson, and John Penotti
  - The Favourite – Ceci Dempsey, Ed Guiney, Lee Magiday, and Yorgos Lanthimos
  - A Quiet Place – Michael Bay, Andrew Form, and Bradley Fuller
  - Roma – Gabriela Rodríguez and Alfonso Cuarón
  - A Star Is Born – Bill Gerber, Bradley Cooper, and Lynette Howell Taylor
  - Vice – Dede Gardner, Jeremy Kleiner, Kevin J. Messick, and Adam McKay
Outstanding Producer of Animated Theatrical Motion Pictures
- Spider-Man: Into the Spider-Verse – Avi Arad, Phil Lord, Christopher Miller, Amy Pascal, and Christina Steinberg
  - Dr. Seuss' The Grinch – Chris Meledandri and Janet Healy
  - Incredibles 2 – John Walker and Nicole Paradis Grindle
  - Isle of Dogs – Wes Anderson, Scott Rudin, Steven Rales, and Jeremy Dawson
  - Ralph Breaks the Internet – Clark Spencer
Outstanding Producer of Documentary Theatrical Motion Pictures
- Won't You Be My Neighbor? – Morgan Neville, Nicholas Ma, and Caryn Capotosto
  - The Dawn Wall – Josh Lowell, Peter Mortimer, and Philipp Manderla
  - Free Solo – Elizabeth Chai Vasarhelyi, Jimmy Chin, Evan Hayes, and Shannon Dill
  - Hal – Christine Beebe, Jonathan Lynch, and Brian Morrow
  - Into the Okavango – Neil Gelinas
  - RBG – Betsy West and Julie Cohen
  - Three Identical Strangers – Becky Read and Grace Hughes-Hallett

=== Television ===
Norman Felton Award for Outstanding Producer of Episodic Television, Drama
- The Americans (FX) – Joe Weisberg, Joel Fields, Chris Long, Graham Yost, Justin Falvey, Darryl Frank, Stephen Schiff, Mary Rae Thewlis, Tracey Scott Wilson, Peter Ackerman, and Joshua Brand
  - Better Call Saul (AMC) – Peter Gould, Vince Gilligan, Mark Johnson, Melissa Bernstein, Thomas Schnauz, Gennifer Hutchison, Nina Jack, Diane Mercer, Gordon Smith, Alison Tatlock, Ann Cherkis, Bob Odenkirk, and Robin Sweet
  - The Handmaid's Tale (Hulu) – Bruce Miller, Warren Littlefield, Elisabeth Moss, Daniel Wilson, Fran Sears, Mike Barker, Sheila Hockin, Eric Tuchman, Kira Snyder, Yahlin Chang, Frank Siracusa, John Weber, Joseph Boccia, Dorothy Fortenberry, Margaret Atwood, and Ron Milbauer
  - Ozark (Netflix) – Jason Bateman, Chris Mundy, Bill Dubuque, Mark Williams, David Manson, Alyson Feltes, Ryan Farley, Patrick Markey, Matthew Spiegel, and Erin Mitchell
  - This Is Us (NBC) – Dan Fogelman, Isaac Aptaker, Elizabeth Berger, John Requa, Glenn Ficarra, Ken Olin, Charles Gogolak, Jess Rosenthal, Steve Beers, KJ Steinberg, Kevin Falls, Julia Brownell, Vera Herbert, Bekah Brunstetter, Shukree Hassan Tilghman, Cathy Mickel Gibson, and Nick Pavonetti
Danny Thomas Award for Outstanding Producer of Episodic Television, Comedy
- The Marvelous Mrs. Maisel (Amazon) – Amy Sherman-Palladino, Daniel Palladino, Dhana Rivera Gilbert, and Sheila Lawrence
  - Atlanta (FX) – Donald Glover, Paul Simms, Dianne McGunigle, Stephen Glover, Hiro Murai, Stefani Robinson, and Alex Orr
  - Barry (HBO) – Alec Berg, Bill Hader, Aida Rodgers, Emily Heller, and Elizabeth Sarnoff
  - GLOW (Netflix) – Jenji Kohan, Liz Flahive, Carly Mensch, Tara Herrmann, Mark A. Burley, Nick Jones, Kim Rosenstock, Sascha Rothchild, and Leanne Moore
  - The Good Place (NBC) – Michael Schur, David Miner, Morgan Sackett, Drew Goddard, Josh Siegal, Dylan Morgan, Joe Mande, Megan Amram, David Hyman, and Jen Statsky
David L. Wolper Award for Outstanding Producer of Limited Series Television
- The Assassination of Gianni Versace: American Crime Story (FX) – Ryan Murphy, Nina Jacobson, Brad Simpson, Alexis Martin Woodall, Tom Rob Smith, Daniel Minahan, Brad Falchuk, Scott Alexander, Larry Karaszewski, Chip Vucelich, Maggie Cohn, Eric Kovtun, Lou Eyrich, and Eryn Krueger Mekash
  - Escape at Dannemora (Showtime) – Ben Stiller, Nicholas Weinstock, Michael De Luca, Bryan Zuriff, Brett Johnson, Michael Tolkin, Bill Carraro, Adam Brightman, and Lisa M. Rowe
  - Maniac (Netflix) – Patrick Somerville, Cary Joji Fukunaga, Michael Sugar, Doug Wald, Jonah Hill, Emma Stone, Pal Kristiansen, Anne Kolbjørnsen, Espen Huseby, Carol Cuddy, Mauricio Katz, Caroline Williams, Ashley Zalta, Jessica Levin, and Jon Mallard
  - The Romanoffs (Amazon) – Kriss Turner Towner, Blake McCormick, Kathy Ciric, Matthew Weiner, and Semi Chellas
  - Sharp Objects (HBO) – Marti Noxon, Jason Blum, Gillian Flynn, Amy Adams, Jean-Marc Vallée, Nathan Ross, Gregg Fienberg, Jessica Rhoades, Marci Wiseman, Jeremy Gold, Vince Calandra, and David Auge
Outstanding Producer of Streamed or Televised Motion Pictures
- Fahrenheit 451 (HBO) – Sarah Green, Ramin Bahrani, Michael B. Jordan, Alan Gasmer, Peter Jaysen, and David Coatsworth
  - King Lear (Amazon) – Colin Callender, Sonia Friedman, Scott Huff, and Noёlette Buckley
  - My Dinner with Hervé (HBO) – Steven Zaillian, Richard Middleton, Ross Katz, Jessica de Rothschild, Sacha Gervasi, Peter Dinklage, and Nathalie Tanner
  - Paterno (HBO) – Barry Levinson, Jason Sosnoff, Tom Fontana, Edward R. Pressman, Rick Nicita, Lindsay Sloane, and Amy Herman
  - Sense8: Together Until the End (Netflix) – Marcus Loges, Alex Boden, Roberto Malerba, Terry Needham, John Toll, Lana Wachowski, J. Michael Straczynski, and Grant Hill
Outstanding Producer of Non-Fiction Television
- Anthony Bourdain: Parts Unknown (CNN) – Anthony Bourdain, Christopher Collins, Lydia Tenaglia, and Sandra Zweig
  - 30 for 30 (ESPN) – Connor Schell, John Dahl, Libby Geist, Erin Leyden, Adam Neuhaus, Jenna Anthony, Gentry Kirby, Marquis Daisy, and Deirdre Fenton
  - Leah Remini: Scientology and the Aftermath (A&E) – Leah Remini, Eli Holzman, Aaron Saidman, Myles Reiff, Mike Rinder, Meaghan Rady, Kai Bowe, Hoo In Kim, Nora Donaghy, Raisa Zaidi, and Dina Demetrius
  - Queer Eye (Netflix) – David Collins, Michael Williams, Rob Eric, Jennifer Lane, Jordana Hochman, Mark Bracero, and Rachelle Mendez
  - Wild Wild Country (Netflix) – Mark Duplass, Jay Duplass, Josh Braun, Dan Braun, and Juliana Lembi
Outstanding Producer of Game & Competition Television
- RuPaul's Drag Race (VH1) – Fenton Bailey, Randy Barbato, Tom Campbell, RuPaul Charles, Mandy Salangsang, Steven Corfe, Bruce McCoy, Michele Mills, Jacqueline Wilson, Thairin Smothers, Jen Passovoy, and Lisa Steele
  - The Amazing Race (CBS) – Jerry Bruckheimer, Bertram van Munster, Jonathan Littman, Elise Doganieri, and Mark Vertullo
  - America's Got Talent (NBC)
  - Top Chef (Bravo) – Dan Cutforth, Jane Lipsitz, Casey Kriley, Tom Colicchio, Padma Lakshmi, Doneen Arquines, Tara Seiner, Justin Rae Barnes, Blake Davis, Wade Sheeler, Brian Fowler, Elida Carbajal Araiza, Zoe Jackson, Patrick Schmedeman, and Diana Schmedeman
  - The Voice (NBC) – John de Mol Jr., Mark Burnett, Audrey Morrissey, Stijn Bakkers, Chad Hines, Amanda Zucker, Kyra Thompson, Teddy Valenti, and Carson Daly
Outstanding Producer of Live Entertainment & Talk Television
- Last Week Tonight with John Oliver (HBO) – John Oliver, Tim Carvell, Liz Stanton, and Jeremy Tchaban
  - The Daily Show with Trevor Noah (Comedy Central) – Trevor Noah, Steve Bodow, Jen Flanz, Jill Katz, Justin Melkmann, David Kibuuka, Zhubin Parang, Max Browning, Eric Davies, Pamela DePace, Ramin Hedayati, Elise Terrell, Dave Blog, Adam Chodikoff, Jimmy Donn, Jeff Gussow, Kira Klang Hopf, Allison MacDonald, and Ryan Middleton
  - The Late Show with Stephen Colbert (CBS) – Stephen Colbert, Chris Licht, Tom Purcell, Jon Stewart, Barry Julien, Denise Rehrig, Tanya Michnevich Bracco, Paul Dinello, Matt Lappin, Opus Moreschi, Emily Gertler, Aaron Cohen, Michael Brumm, Paige Kendig, and Jake Plunkett
  - Real Time with Bill Maher (HBO) – Bill Maher, Scott Carter, Sheila Griffiths, Marc Gurvitz, Billy Martin, Dean E. Johnsen, Chris Kelly, and Matt Wood
  - Saturday Night Live (NBC) – Lorne Michaels, Steve Higgins, Erik Kenward, Lindsay Shookus, Erin Doyle, Tom Broecker, and Ken Aymong
Outstanding Sports Program
- Being Serena (HBO)
  - E:60 (ESPN)
  - Hard Knocks: Training Camp With the Cleveland Browns (HBO)
  - Real Sports with Bryant Gumbel (HBO)
  - SportsCenter With Scott Van Pelt (ESPN)
Outstanding Children's Program
- Sesame Street (PBS/HBO)
  - Fuller House (Netflix)
  - PJ Masks (Disney Junior)
  - A Series of Unfortunate Events (Netflix)
  - Teen Titans Go! (Cartoon Network)
Outstanding Short-Form Program
- Comedians in Cars Getting Coffee (Netflix)
  - Biography: History, Herstory (Lifetime)
  - Carpool Karaoke: The Series (Apple TV)
  - Her America: 50 Women, 50 States (Lifetime)
  - Kevin Hart: What The Fit (YouTube)

=== Milestone Award ===
- Toby Emmerich

=== Stanley Kramer Award ===
- Jane Fonda

=== Visionary Award ===
- Kenya Barris

=== David O. Selznick Achievement Award in Theatrical Motion Pictures ===
- Kevin Feige

=== Norman Lear Achievement Award in Television ===
- Amy Sherman-Palladino
