= 13th Producers Guild of America Awards =

13th Annual Producers Guild Awards
- Date: March 3, 2002
- Location: The Century Plaza Hotel, Los Angeles, California
- Country: United States
- Presented by: Producers Guild of America

Highlights
- Best Producer(s) Motion Picture: Moulin Rouge! – Fred Baron, Martin Brown, and Baz Luhrmann

The 13th Producers Guild of America Awards (also known as 2002 Producers Guild Awards), honoring the best film and television producers of 2001, were held at The Century Plaza Hotel in Los Angeles, California on March 3, 2002. The nominees were announced on January 10, 2002.

== Winners and nominees ==
=== Film ===
Darryl F. Zanuck Award for Outstanding Producer of Theatrical Motion Pictures
- Moulin Rouge! – Baz Luhrmann, Fred Baron, and Martin Brown
  - A Beautiful Mind
  - Harry Potter and the Sorcerer's Stone
  - The Lord of the Rings: The Fellowship of the Ring
  - Shrek

=== Television ===
Norman Felton Award for Outstanding Producer of Episodic Television, Drama
- The West Wing
  - CSI: Crime Scene Investigation
  - Law & Order
  - Six Feet Under
  - The Sopranos
Danny Thomas Award for Outstanding Producer of Episodic Television, Comedy
- Sex and the City
  - Frasier
  - Friends
  - Malcolm in the Middle
  - Will & Grace
David L. Wolper Award for Outstanding Producer of Long-Form Television
- Band of Brothers
  - 61*
  - Anne Frank: The Whole Story
  - Life with Judy Garland: Me and My Shadows
  - Wit

=== David O. Selznick Lifetime Achievement Award in Theatrical Motion Pictures ===
- Lawrence Gordon

=== David Susskind Lifetime Achievement Award in Television ===
- Marcy Carsey, Tom Werner, and Caryn Mandabach (Carsey-Werner-Mandabach)

=== Milestone Award ===
- Robert Wise

=== PGA Hall of Fame ===
- Theatrical Motion Pictures: The Manchurian Candidate and Network
- Television: Happy Days and Maude

=== Stanley Kramer Award ===
- Marshall Herskovitz, Jessie Nelson, Richard Solomon, and Edward Zwick for I Am Sam

=== Vanguard Award ===
- Pixar Animation Studios (Edwin Catmull, John Lasseter, and Steve Jobs)

=== Visionary Award ===
- Joel Gallen for America: A Tribute to Heroes
