= 16th Producers Guild of America Awards =

16th Annual Producers Guild Awards
- Date: January 22, 2005
- Location: Culver Studios, Los Angeles, California
- Country: United States
- Presented by: Producers Guild of America
- Hosted by: Wayne Brady

Highlights
- Best Producer(s) Motion Picture: The Aviator – Graham King and Michael Mann

The 16th Producers Guild of America Awards (also known as 2005 Producers Guild Awards), honoring the best film and television producers of 2004, were held on January 22, 2005. The ceremony at Culver Studios in Los Angeles, California was hosted by Wayne Brady. The nominees were announced on January 5, 2005.

== Winners and nominees ==
=== Film ===
Darryl F. Zanuck Award for Outstanding Producer of Theatrical Motion Pictures
- The Aviator – Michael Mann and Graham King
  - Finding Neverland – Richard N. Gladstein and Nellie Bellflower
  - The Incredibles – John Walker
  - Million Dollar Baby – Clint Eastwood, Albert S. Ruddy, and Tom Rosenberg
  - Sideways – Michael London

=== Television ===
Norman Felton Award for Outstanding Producer of Episodic Television, Drama
- The Sopranos
  - CSI: Crime Scene Investigation
  - Nip/Tuck
  - Six Feet Under
  - The West Wing
Danny Thomas Award for Outstanding Producer of Episodic Television, Comedy
- Curb Your Enthusiasm
  - Arrested Development
  - Scrubs
  - Sex and the City
  - Will & Grace
David L. Wolper Award for Outstanding Producer of Long-Form Television
- Angels in America
  - Horatio Hornblower
  - Ike: Countdown to D-Day
  - The Lion in Winter
  - Something the Lord Made
Outstanding Producer of Non-Fiction Television
- The Amazing Race
  - The Apprentice
  - Extreme Makeover: Home Edition
  - Inside the Actors Studio
  - Queer Eye for the Straight Guy
Outstanding Producer of Variety Television
- The Ellen DeGeneres Show
  - The 76th Annual Academy Awards
  - Chappelle's Show
  - Late Show with David Letterman
  - Saturday Night Live

=== David O. Selznick Achievement Award in Theatrical Motion Pictures ===
- Laura Ziskin

=== David Susskind Achievement Award in Television ===
- John Wells

=== Milestone Award ===
- Jeffrey Katzenberg

=== Stanley Kramer Award ===
- Hotel Rwanda
- Voces inocentes (Innocent Voices)

=== Vanguard Award ===
- Terry Semel

=== Visionary Award ===
- Rescue Me
