= 14th Producers Guild of America Awards =

14th Annual Producers Guild Awards
- Date: March 2, 2003
- Location: The Century Plaza Hotel, Los Angeles, California
- Country: United States
- Presented by: Producers Guild of America
- Hosted by: Patricia Heaton

Highlights
- Best Producer(s) Motion Picture: Chicago – Marty Richards

The 14th Producers Guild of America Awards (also known as 2003 Producers Guild Awards), honoring the best film and television producers of 2002, were held at The Century Plaza Hotel in Los Angeles, California on March 2, 2003. The ceremony was hosted by Patricia Heaton. The nominees were announced on January 16, 2003.

== Winners and nominees ==
=== Film ===
Darryl F. Zanuck Award for Outstanding Producer of Theatrical Motion Pictures
- Chicago – Martin Richards
  - Adaptation – Edward Saxon, Jonathan Demme, and Vincent Landay
  - Gangs of New York – Alberto Grimaldi and Harvey Weinstein
  - The Lord of the Rings: The Two Towers – Barrie M. Osborne, Peter Jackson, and Fran Walsh
  - My Big Fat Greek Wedding – Rita Wilson, Tom Hanks, and Gary Goetzman
  - Road to Perdition – Richard D. Zanuck and Dean Zanuck

=== Television ===
Norman Felton Award for Outstanding Producer of Episodic Television, Drama
- 24
  - CSI: Crime Scene Investigation
  - Six Feet Under
  - The Sopranos
  - The West Wing
Danny Thomas Award for Outstanding Producer of Episodic Television, Comedy
- Curb Your Enthusiasm
  - Everybody Loves Raymond
  - Malcolm in the Middle
  - Sex and the City
  - Will & Grace
David L. Wolper Award for Outstanding Producer of Long-Form Television
- Live from Baghdad
  - The Gathering Storm
  - The Laramie Project
  - Path to War
  - Shackleton
Outstanding Producer of Reality/Game/Informational Series Television
- Biography
  - American Idol
  - Frontline
  - The Osbournes
  - Project Greenlight

=== David O. Selznick Lifetime Achievement Award in Theatrical Motion Pictures ===
- Robert Evans

=== David Susskind Lifetime Achievement Award in Television ===
- Bud Yorkin

=== Milestone Award ===
- Jack Valenti

=== Stanley Kramer Award ===
- Todd Black and Denzel Washington for Antwone Fisher

=== Vanguard Award ===
- George Lucas

=== Visionary Award ===
- Rita Wilson for My Big Fat Greek Wedding
