= Together =

Together may refer to:

== Literature ==
- Together (book), a 2005 children's book by Dimitrea Tokunbo and Jennifer Gwynne Oliver
- Together (magazine), an international lifestyle magazine

== Organizations ==
=== Political parties ===
- Together (Belarus) (Razam), an opposition liberal unregistered party of Belarus
- Spolu (Czech Republic) (Together), a centre-right coalition of parties in the Czech Republic
- Ensemble! (Together!), a left-wing political party in France
- Ensemble Citoyens (Together), a liberal political coalition in France
- Together (Hungary), a social-liberal political party in Hungary
- Together (Israel), an alliance of parties in Israel
- Together (Italy), a progressive coalition of parties in Italy
- Together (political bloc), a pro-European political bloc in Moldova
- Together Party (Partia Razem), a leftist political party in Poland
- Together (Serbia), a green political party in Serbia
- Together for Serbia, defunct political party in Serbia
- TOGETHER – Civic Democracy, a liberal-conservative party in Slovakia

=== Other organizations ===
- Together for Mental Wellbeing, a UK mental health charity
- Together campaign, by US cities, to help consumers fight climate change
- Together (Australia), a trade union in the state of Queensland, Australia

== Film and TV ==
=== Film ===
- Together (1943 film), a Hungarian comedy
- Together (1956 film), a British drama directed by Lorenza Mazzetti
- Together (1971 film), an American film directed by Sean S. Cunningham and starring Marilyn Chambers
- Together?, a 1979 Italian film starring Jacqueline Bissett
- Together (2000 film), a Swedish comedy drama directed by Lukas Moodysson
- Together (2002 film), a Chinese drama directed by Chen Kaige
- Together (2009 film), a British short directed by Eicke Bettinga and starring Matt Smith
- Together (2009 Mexican film), a film by Nicolás Pereda
- Together (2011 film), a Chinese documentary by Zhao Liang
- To.get.her, a 2011 American mystery thriller directed by Erica Dunton
- Together (2018 film), a British film directed by Paul Duddridge
- Together, a 2018 American short directed by Terrence Malick
- Together (2021 TV film), a British film
- Together (2021 short film), a Canadian short directed by Albert Shin
- Together (2022 film), a Czech psychological drama
- Together (2025 film), a horror film directed by Michael Shanks

=== Television ===
- Together (1980 TV series), a British soap opera made by Southern Television
- Together (Singaporean TV series), a 2009 Singaporean program
- ToGetHer, a 2009 Taiwanese drama starring Rainie Yang, Jiro Wang and George Hu
- Together (2015 TV series), a 2015 British sitcom
- Together (TV channel), a UK-based television channel, owned by The Community Channel CBS

== Music ==
=== Bands ===
- Together (British band), a 1990s rave band
- Together (duo), a 2000s French house music duo
- Together, a group with a 1997 number-one single in Sweden

=== Albums ===
- Together (Anne Murray album), 1975
- Together (Country Joe and the Fish album), 1968
- Together (Dave Dee, Dozy, Beaky, Mick & Tich album), 1969
- Together (Duster album), 2022
- Together! (Elvin Jones and Philly Joe Jones album), 1961
- Together (Eric Kloss and Barry Miles album) or the title song, 1977
- Together (Ferry Corsten album) or the title song, 2003
- Together (Golden Earring album), 1972
- Together (Jane album) or the title song, 1972
- Together (Jerry Lee Lewis album), 1969
- Together (Joe Williams and Harry Edison album), 1961
- Together (John Farnham and Allison Durbin album), 1971
- Together (Johnny and Edgar Winter album), 1976
- Together (Jonathan and Charlotte album), 2012
- Together (Larry Coryell and Emily Remler album), 1985
- Together (Lollipop album), 2004
- Together (Lulu album), 2002
- Together (Marcus & Martinus album) or the title song, 2016
- Together (Marina Prior and Mark Vincent album), 2016
- Together (Marvin Gaye and Mary Wells album), 1964
- Together (McCoy Tyner album), 1979
- Together (Michael Ball and Alfie Boe album), 2016
- Together (The New Pornographers album), 2010
- Together (The New Seekers album), 1974
- Together (The Oak Ridge Boys album), 1980
- Together (Reef album), 2003
- Together (Jolin Tsai album), 2001
- Together (S Club Juniors album) or the title song, 2002
- Together (S.H.E album), 2003
- Together (Sister Sledge album), 1977
- Together (Steve Kuhn and Toshiko Akiyoshi album) or The Country and Western Sound of Jazz Pianos, 1963
- Together (The Supremes and the Temptations album), 1969
- Together (Tommy Flanagan and Kenny Barron album), 1979
- Together: A New Chuck Mangione Concert, 1971
- Together, by Blake, 2009
- Together, by FanFan, 2012
- Together, by Gaither Vocal Band and Ernie Haase & Signature Sound, 2007
- Together, by Jackpine Savage (Bruce Haack), 1971
- Together, by Jesse Colin Young, 1972
- Together, by Louis Prima & Keely Smith, 1960
- Together, by the Vapors, or the title song, 2020
- Together, by the Watts 103rd Street Rhythm Band, 1968

=== EPs ===
- Together, by Beyond, 2003
- Together, by Tiësto, 2019

=== Songs ===
==== Singles ====
- "Together" (1928 song), a pop standard by Buddy G. DeSylva, Lew Brown, and Ray Henderson
- "Together" (Amii Stewart and Mike Francis song), 1985
- "Together", by Artificial Funk, 2002
- "Together" (Ella Eyre song), 2015
- "Together" (For King & Country, Tori Kelly and Kirk Franklin song), 2020
- "Together" (The Intruders song), 1967; covered by Tierra, 1980
- "Together" (Krystal Meyers song), 2006
- "Together", by Mitch Tambo, competing to represent Australia in the Eurovision Song Contest 2020
- "Together" (Pet Shop Boys song), 2010
- "Together" (Ryan O'Shaughnessy song), represented Ireland in Eurovision 2018
- "Together" (Selah Sue song), 2016
- "Together" (Sia song), 2020
- "Together" (Together song), 2000
- "Together" (TVXQ song), 2007
- "Juntos (Together)", by Juanes, 2015
- "Together", by Ziggy Alberts, 2020

==== From albums ====
- "Together", by Avril Lavigne from Under My Skin, 2004
- "Together", by Backstreet Boys from A Very Backstreet Christmas, 2022
- "Together", by Beabadoobee from Fake It Flowers, 2020
- "Together", by Bob Sinclar from Soundz of Freedom, 2007
- "Together", by Boyzone from Said and Done, 1995
- "Together", by Calvin Harris from Motion, 2014
- "Together", by Demi Lovato from Unbroken, 2011
- "Together", by Diana Ross from Ross, 1978
- "Together", by Disclosure from Settle: The Remixes, 2013
- "Together", by Dreamcatcher from Apocalypse: Save Us, 2022
- "Together", by Harry Nilsson from Aerial Ballet, 1968
- "Together", by Helen Reddy from Rarities from the Capitol Vaults, 2009
- "Together", by Keith Moon from Two Sides of the Moon, 1975
- "Together", by Maggie Rogers from Notes from the Archive: Recordings 2011-2016, 2020
- "Together", by Marshmello from Joytime II, 2018
- "Together", by Martin Garrix from Seven, 2016
- "Together", by Masta Ace from Take a Look Around, 1990
- "Together", by Michael Fall from Turn on your radio, 2013
- "Together", by the Raconteurs from Broken Boy Soldiers, 2006
- "Together", by Ruben Studdard from Love Is, 2009
- "Together", by Sault from 11, 2022
- "Together", by Skindred from Babylon, 2002
- "Together", by Suede, a B-side of the single "New Generation", 1995
- "Together", by Ted Nugent from Free-for-All, 1976
- "Together", by Trippie Redd from Life's a Trip, 2018

==== From other media ====
- "Together (Wherever We Go)", by Jule Styne and Stephen Sondheim from the musical Gypsy, 1959
- "Together", by Callie Twisselman from My Little Pony: A New Generation, 2021
- "Together", by the xx from The Great Gatsby: Music from Baz Luhrmann's Film, 2013

== Other uses ==
- Together (software), a discontinued CASE and UML modeling product
- Operation Moshtarak, an ISAF campaign in Afghanistan
- Yahoo Together, a messaging app by Yahoo

== See also ==
- 2gether (disambiguation)
- Juntos (disambiguation)
- Together Again (disambiguation)
- Together Forever (disambiguation)
- Togetherness (disambiguation)
- To Get Her (disambiguation)
- Both (disambiguation)
