= Jane (German band) =

German rock band

- Origin: Hanover, Germany
- Genre: Rock
- Years active: 1970–present
- Spinoff of: The J.P.s
- Members: Peter Panka's Jane; Klaus Walz; Fritz Randow; Niklas Turmann; Corvin Bahn; Werner Nadolny's Jane; Holger Marx; Rolf Vatteroth; Hakan Türközü; Sven Petersen
- Past members: Peter Panka; Werner Nadolny; Predrag Jovanović; Martin Hesse; Gottfried Janko; Klaus Hess; Manfred Wieczorke; Arndt Schulz; Wolfgang Krantz; Charly Maucher
- Website: Jane (Peter Panka); Jane (Werner Nadolny)

Jane is a German progressive rock/krautrock band that was formed in October 1970 in Hanover.

== Band history ==
Playing a melodious synthesis of symphonic hard rock, that has occasionally been compared to Pink Floyd, Hannover Krautrockers Jane can trace their origins back to the late sixties psychedelic band The J.P.s (Justice of Peace). Releasing a single "Save Me"/"War" in 1968, the band featured future Jane members Peter Panka on vocals, Klaus Hess on bass and Werner Nadolny on saxophone. By late 1970 The J.P.s had dissolved and regrouped as Jane with Panka on vocals and drums, Hess switching to guitar and Nadolny assuming keyboards. Charly Maucher joined on bass and power vocalist Bernd Pulst completed the band in April 1971 and their first LP Together was released on the Hamburg-based record label Brain Records in the spring of 1972. Singing in broken English, which helped create passionate effects, a heavy expressive bluesy sound emerged with blistering Les Paul solos and slabs of Hammond organ backdrops, that was consolidated by Peter Panka's almost hypnotic oscillating drum beats, that would characterize Jane's music for almost 40 years. Together was warmly received by the German music press including Sounds magazine, who had declared Pulst its vocalist of the year for 1971.

The first of an almost continual succession of lineup changes occurred later that year with Pulst departing and Maucher bowing out for health reasons. Former Justice Of Peace guitarist Wolfgang Krantz joined on bass and guitar with Panka and Hess sharing the vocals, which displayed even more lethargic and stoned out sonic timbres. Applying their proven formula, their 1973 follow up album Here We Are was somewhat more harmonious with the addition of synthesizers, that provided spacier atmospheres and produced a fan favourite in the form of the sombre rock ballad "Out in the Rain". Shortly after the album's release Nadolny left to form a new band Lady with the recovered Maucher returning on bass and vocals. Jane's third endeavour, simply entitled Jane III (1974), was a scorching guitar blowout and with Krantz on second guitar. The void left by departing keyboardist Nadolny was adequately compensated for with two dueling guitarists as demonstrated by an impressive in-studio jam entitled "Jane Session" as well as a spaced out extended track "Comin' Again" featuring Maucher's harder edged vocals. Not long after the release of Jane III, Maucher and Krantz departed, eventually forming Harlis on the fledgling Sky Records label. In May 1974 Jane rejuvenated itself by absorbing two members from the recently disbanded hard rock band Dull Knife with Martin Hesse on bass and Gottfried Janko on vocals and keyboards. The slightly more upbeat album Lady (1975) was recorded by this lineup in early 1975, during which time Matthias Jabs of Scorpions fame would also join them for a brief period for some live performances.

Keyboardist Werner Nadolny returned in 1976 for Jane's expansive 33 minute symphonic progressive rock piece Fire, Water, Earth & Air (1976). Featuring layers of Hammonds, Moogs, Mellotrons and synths, it was considered Jane at their creative zenith and the Jane album that would hold the most appeal for progheads.

Nadolny would split once again after the completion of Fire, Water, Earth & Air and was replaced by Eloy keyboardist Manfred Wieczorke for an extensive tour, which spawned another coup de grace for Jane resulting in the stunning Jane at Home Live (1976) double live LP replete with a cover of a Martian landscape snapped by the Viking Mars lander. Released in early 1977 and broadcast nationally in its entirety on WDR Radio in January of that year, Live at Home went gold in their native Germany and helped them break the international markets in both North America as well as Japan and South America.

Containing somewhat darker conceptual atmospheres, their 7th studio album Between Heaven and Hell (1977) once again followed progrock paradigms. Mixed reactions within the German music press did not prevent the album from being embraced by fans, that was at times similar to Pink Floyd's capacious stylings. By this time Jane had become one of the top draws in the German music scene as well as attracting followings in Switzerland and Austria even though they continued to sing in English.

Recorded in the band's personal 24 track studio, 1978's Age of Madness rocked it out a little harder maintaining emotional spacey timbres and was released internationally, being presented in clear and red vinyl formats on the now defunct Canadian label Bomb Records. A successful European tour ensued but Wieczorke departed in early 1979.

Jane's following album Sign No. 9 (1979) was a near disaster with Jane being reduced to a trio forcing Hess to double on keyboards and the album inevitably had a guitar dominated sound, which was devoid of the spacious moods created by lush keyboards on earlier Jane recordings. Signs of creative burnout cast some doubts not only in the minds of fans but within the band themselves.

A new direction was taken in the 1980s on a self-titled album Jane (Mask) (1980), that is sometimes referred to as Mask by aficionados. It incorporated new wave, punk and jazzy elements in straight rock configurations and introduced a new vocalist/guitarist/keyboardist, Yugoslavian eccentric Predrag Jovanovic or "Pedja". Vocals were never Jane's forte and Pedja's energetic deliveries gave them a fresh sound but this album was his only appearance with the band and he returned to his native Yugoslavia to form the synth-pop group D' Boys.

Bassman Charly Maucher returned to the fold for 1982's Germania (1982) and although it contained some more experiments including a reggae excursion on the track "Get Back to You" Jane remained, for the most part, a straight hard rock band and included a reworked version of "Your Circle" from their Between Heaven and Hell album entitled "Southern Line", that even ventured into heavy metal territory.

Internal disagreements between founding members Peter Panka and Klaus Hess resulted in Hess' departure in 1982. He would subsequently release a solo album Sternentanz in 1983, that would recall earlier Jane stylings.

Meanwhile, after collaborating on the musical production on the German rock ballett "Warlock", composed by Jon Symon, with other former members of Jane, Peter Panka reformed Jane as a touring band under the moniker Lady Jane in 1984 with various musicians. Unfortunately a coherent unit failed to materialize for the remainder of the decade and only one pop-oriented album Beautiful Lady was released in 1986 with no real connection to past glories. Two live albums were also released in 1989 and 1990 with the former being limited to only 300 pressings and both featured Panka on drums/vocals, Nadolny on keyboards, Klaus Henatsch on bass and keyboards, and Kai Reuter on guitar performing older Jane material.

In 1992 Hess and Panka attempted to reconcile and along with Nadolny on keyboards and with Jens Dettmer they embarked on a reunion tour, that included 13 dates in New Zealand! But the reconciliation failed and Jane split into two factions with Hess calling his version Mother Jane while the Panka formation became unofficially known as Peter Panka's Jane as he retained the rights for the band name and logo.

In 1996 Peter Panka's Jane (initially referred to as Pano's Jane) recorded the studio album Resurrection and introduced ex-Epitaph member Klaus Walz along with Kai Reuter (formerly of Kasch) on guitars with veteran Nadolny returning on keyboards and Mark Giebeler on bass.

Meanwhile Hess' Mother Jane with younger musicians was also touring playing mostly Jane classics, releasing a single in 1998 and a live album Comes Alive in 2000, that reflected the heavier side of Jane.

A more cohesive attempt was made by Panka in 2002 to rekindle the classic Jane groove of the seventies with Klaus Walz joining original members Panka, Nadolny and Maucher. A new album Genuine (2002) (that also contained some live tracks from the failed 1992 reunion) materialized and was followed by a tour which saw the band performing the new material but focused on renditions of old classics.

A live album, Live 2002 (2002), documented the shows and although not possessing the impact of 1976's Live at Home, it was a definite indication of Jane's return to the limelight attracting both old and new fans. Not content to tour solely as a retro-Jane band, two more studio albums Shine On (2003) and Voices (2006) were released, that burned on in the classic Jane tradition.

Tragically, founding member Peter Panka died as result of cancer in June 2007, which put the band on hold. However, in compliance with Panka's wishes original member Charly Maucher took over as leader and another studio album Traces was released in 2009 with the lineup of Charly Maucher on lead vocals/bass, Klaus Walz guitar/vocals, Arndt Schulz guitar vocals and Fritz Randow (ex Eloy & Saxon) on drums plus Werner Nadolny on keyboards. Although Werner Nadolny has since left the band, he toured with his own Jane tribute band performing vintage Jane material. Klaus Hess' Mother Jane also remained active with an in 2009 released album titled In Dreams.

Along with other bands such as Amon Düül II, Grobschnitt and Guru Guru, Jane continues to bear the torch of the early seventies Krautrock phenomenon and continues in that spirit to this day in three different guises.

== Gallery ==
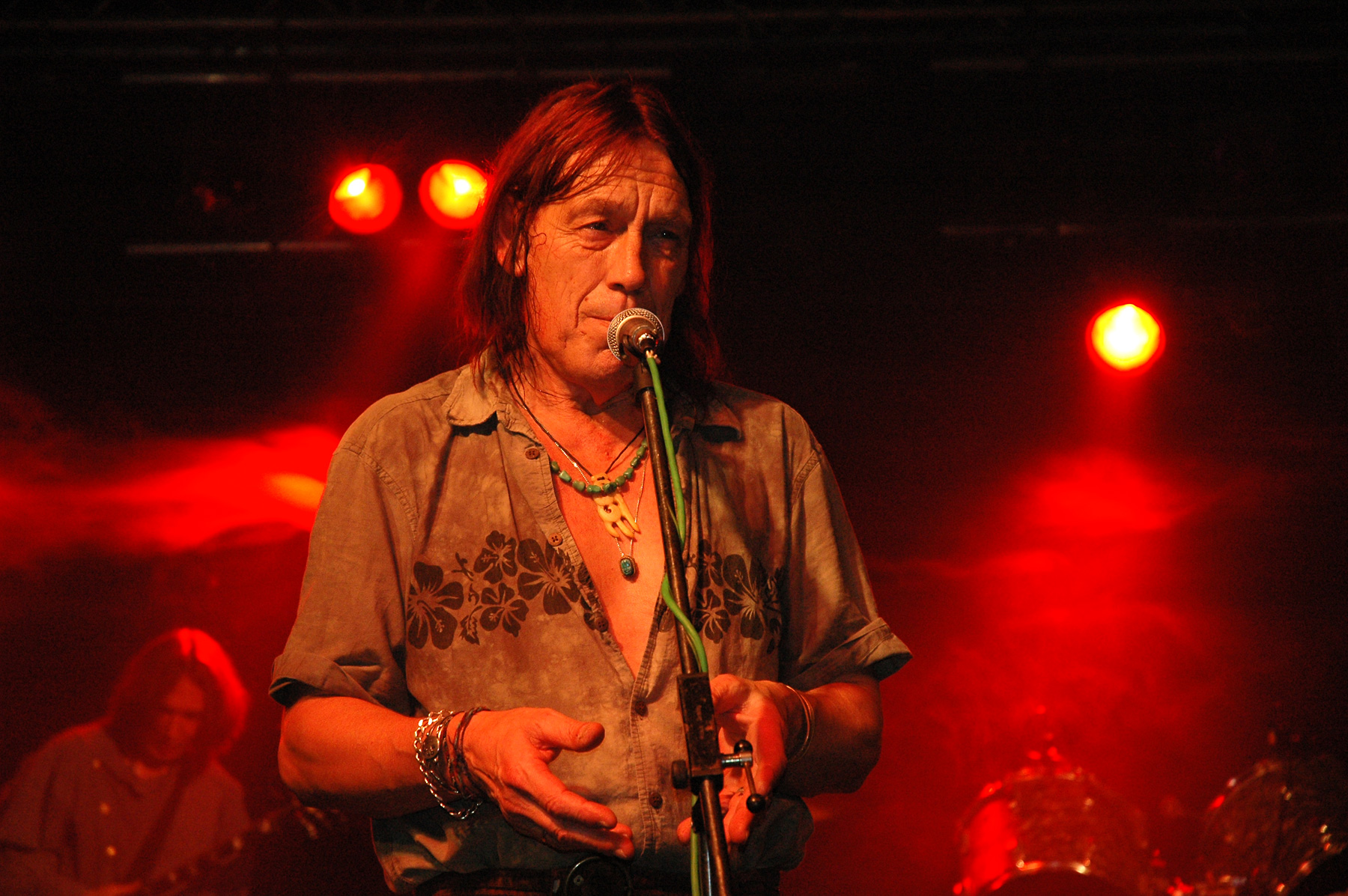
Peter Panka with Jane in 2004

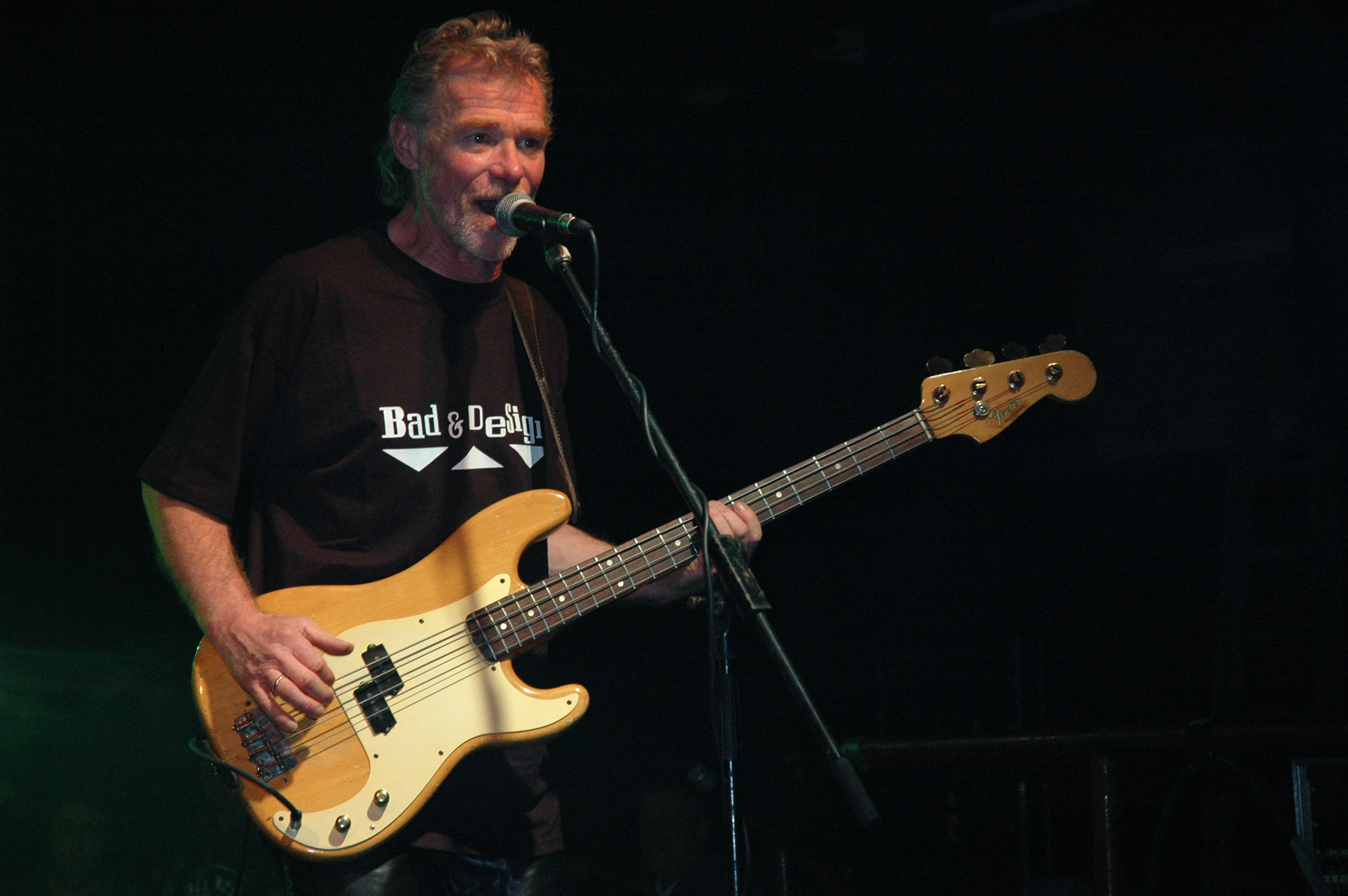
Charly Maucher with Jane in 2004

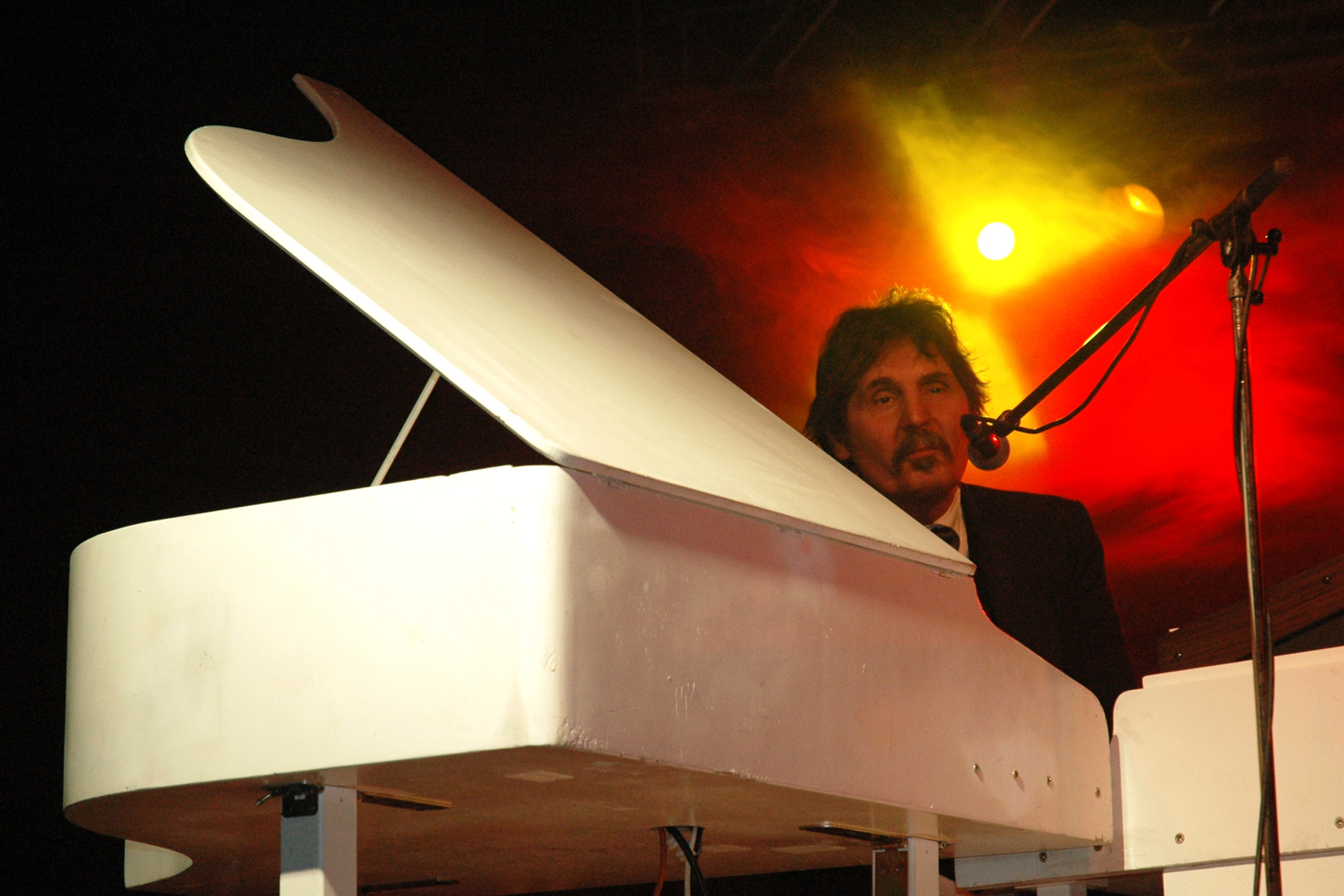
Werner Nadolny with Jane in 2004

== Line-up ==
=== Current members of Peter Panka's JANE ===
- Klaus Walz - lead guitars, vocals
- Fritz Randow - drums from 2007 (replacing the late Peter Panka)
- Niklas Turmann - lead vocals, guitar, from 2011
- Corvin Bahn - keyboards, vocals, from 2011

=== Current members of Werner Nadolny's JANE ===
- Holger Marx - guitars, vocals, from 2023
- Rolf Vatteroth - bass, vocals, from 2010
- Hakan Türközü - keyboards, from 2023
- Sven Petersen - drums, from 2009

=== Past members ===
- Peter Panka (b. March 3, 1948, d. June 28, 2007) - lead vocals, drums (deceased)
- Werner Nadolny (b. April 3, 1947, d. May 22, 2023) - keyboards, saxophone, synthesizer (1970 - 1973, 1975 - 1976, 1983 - 2007) (deceased)
- Predrag Jovanović (aka Pedja) - guitar, keyboards, lead vocals (1980)
- Martin Hesse - bass, lead vocals (1974 - 1980) (b. May 23, 1949 - d. August 18, 2020) (deceased)
- Gottfried Janko - lead vocals, organ, synthesizer (1975) (ex-Dull Knife) (b. July 19, 1946, d. autumn 2004 of a heart attack) (deceased)
- Klaus Hess (b November 20, 1946, d. October 31, 2025- guitar, bass, lead vocals (1970 - 1982, 1992) (deceased)
- Manfred Wieczorke - keyboards (1976 - 1979) (ex-Eloy)
- Arndt Schulz - guitars, lead vocals (2007 - 2011) (ex-Harlis)
- Wolfgang Krantz - guitar, bass, keyboards (1972 - 1974), keyboards (2007 - 2011) (ex-Harlis, ex-Efendis Garden)
- Charly Maucher (1970 - 72, 1973 - 74, 1982 - 84, 1988 - 92, 2000 - 2019) (b. May 6, 1947, d. August 28, 2019) - lead vocals, bass (deceased)

== Discography ==
=== Vinyl ===
- Together (1972)
- Here We Are (1973)
- Jane III (1974)
- Lady (1975)
- Fire, Water, Earth & Air (1976)
- Jane at Home Live (1976)
- Between Heaven and Hell (1977)
- Age of Madness (1978)
- Sign No. 9 (1979)
- Jane (the mask album) (1980)
- Germania (1982)
- Jon Symon's Warlock - Memories of a White Magician (feat. Lady Jane) (1983)
- Jon Symon's Warlock - Lady Macbeth (1983)
- Sternentanz (Klaus Hess) (1983)
- Beautiful Lady (1986)
- Live '88 (1989)
- Live '89 (1990)

=== CDs ===
- Together (1990)
- Here We Are (1997)
- Jane III (1997)
- Lady (1997)
- Fire, Water, Earth & Air (1990)
- Live at Home (1992)
- Between Heaven and Hell (1997)
- Age of Madness (1997)
- Sign No. 9 (1997)
- Jane (the mask album) (1997)
- Germania (1997)
- Sternentanz (Klaus Hess) (2007)
- Beautiful Lady (1993)
- Live '89 (1990)
- Resurrection (Peter Panka's Jane) (1996)
- Comes Alive (Klaus Hess' Mother Jane) (2000)
- Back Again (Lady Jane) (2000)
- Genuine (Jane / Peter Panka's Jane / Mother Jane) (2002)
- Live 2002 (Peter Panka's Jane) (2002)
- Shine On (Peter Panka's Jane) (2003)
- Voices (Peter Panka's Jane) (2006)
- Live at META's (Peter Panka's Jane) (2007)
- Tribute to Peter Panka (Werner Nadolny's Jane) (2008)
- Proceed with Memories (Werner Nadolny's Jane) (2009)
- In Dreams (Klaus Hess' Mother Jane) (2009)
- Traces (Peter Panka's Jane) (2009)
- Hungry4Live (Klaus Hess' Mother Jane) (2010)
- Hungry4Live part 2 (Klaus Hess' Mother Jane) (2010)
- The Journey - Best of Jane '70-'80 (Werner Nadolny's Jane) (2010)
- Eternity (Werner Nadolny's Jane) (2011)
- Kuxan Suum (Peter Panka's Jane) (2011)
- Turn The Page (Klaus Hess' Mother Jane) (incl. bonus CD The Lost Tracks by Jane) (2012)
- Stopover (Werner Nadolny's Jane) (2013)
- The Journey II - Transformation (Werner Nadolny's Jane) (2014)
- Balver Höhle 2014 Live (Peter Panka's Jane) (2014)
- Inbetween (Werner Nadolny's Jane) (2015)
- Journey III - Arrival (Werner Nadolny's Jane) (2016)
- Jon Symon's Warlock - Memories of a White Magician (feat. Lady Jane) (2022)
- Jon Symon's Warlock - Lady Macbeth (2022)

=== Singles ===
- Daytime (1972)
- Here We Are (1973)
- Bambule Rock (1974)
- Age of Madness (1978)
- Love Song (1978)
- Beautiful Lady (Maxi-Single) (1986)
- Together We Stand (Mother Jane) (1998)

=== Compilations ===
- Waiting for the Sunshine (1979)
- Rock on Brain (2 LP) (1980)

=== DVD ===
- Krautrock Meeting (2005)
- PP Jane - Live 2002 Hannover (2005)
- Jane - Tribute to Peter Panka (2008)
- PP Jane - Inside - (The Cave - Concert) (2010)
- WN Jane - Live 2010 / Fernsehkonzert 2010 (2010)
- WN Jane - Eternity (2011)
- WN Jane - Visual Impressions (2011)
- WN Jane - Live at Home Again - Hannover 2011 (2011)
- WN Jane - Live in Reinheim 12. May 2012 (2012)
- [[PP Jane - Lörracher Rocknacht 2012 (live video)]] (2012)
- PP Jane - Phoenix (live videos 1987-2012) (2013)
- PP Jane - German Kultrock Festival Balver Höhle 2012 (2013)

== Bibliography ==
- Matthias Blazek: Das niedersächsische Bandkompendium 1963–2003 – Daten und Fakten von 100 Rockgruppen aus Niedersachsen. Celle 2006, p. 75–77 ISBN 978-3-00-018947-0
