= Jon Symon =

English composer and singer (1941–2015)

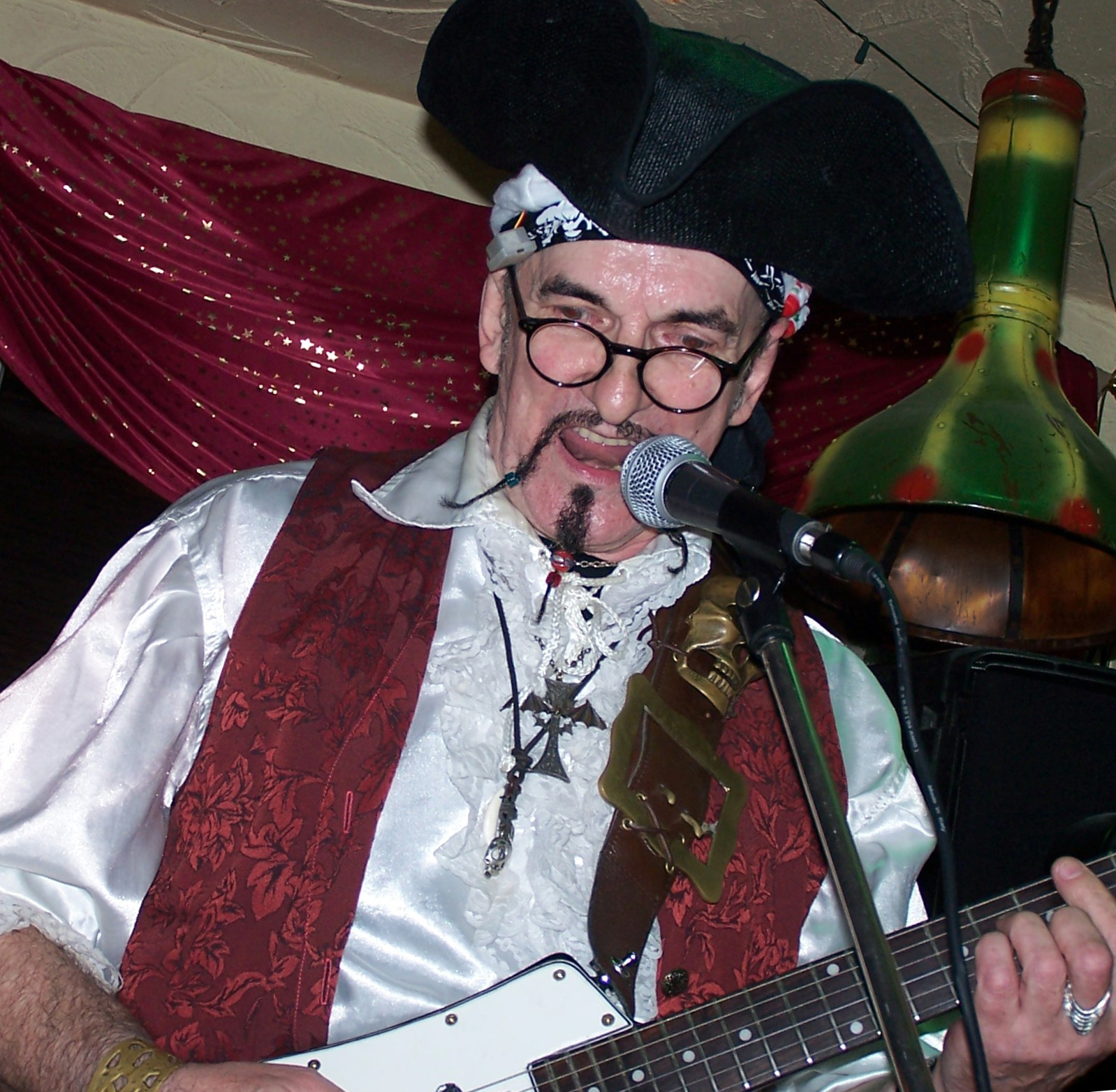
- Jon Symon at a club performance in Hanover in December 2008

Background information
- Also known as: Jon Symon
- Born: Simon John Hornsby; 10 January 1941; Epsom, England
- Died: 7 December 2015 (aged 74) Isle of Wight, England
- Genre: Pop rock
- Occupations: Singer, record producer, songwriter
- Years active: 1965–2015
- Labels: Lava Records, Rox Records, No Fun Records, BASF, Hansa

Jon Symon (born Simon John Hornsby; 10 January 1941 – 7 December 2015) was a British rock musician and composer who lived in Germany from the mid-1960s. He was part of the founding generation of the Hanoverian rock scene. He became known to a wider audience in the early 1980s as the composer of the rock ballet Warlock, in which he was also the singer with the accompanying Deutschrock band, most of whose members were from Jane.

== Early life (1941–1963) ==
Symon came into contact with music at the age of 4 when he was able to play a miniature drum kit at St George's Hotel, Bradford, where his father worked as a hotel manager. First performances with the hotel orchestra followed. At the age of 15, Symon formed his first band, a skiffle band called Satellites. During the same period, he also discovered his interest in space travel and astronautics, which led to him leaving college at 17 and working in a factory that made fuel tanks for rockets. Together with some friends, he developed his own rocket to break a world record set by some American rocket enthusiasts of the same age.

In 1961, he moved to the Isle of Wight, where he attended Newport College for a few semesters studying aerodynamics. Two years later, Symon (using his surname Hornsby) stood for local council in Ryde as a Liberal candidate. After losing the election and losing his career prospects, he joined the Royal Artillery.

== Army time (1963–1970) ==
A year later, in 1964, he was stationed in Bielefeld and formed the band The Demons there with some comrades. After the band had played together for just under a year, the army leadership wanted to disband the group, which led to Symon leaving his troupe without permission, returning to England to gain a musical foothold. Unsuccessfully, however, he returned to his unit after some time. In 1966 Symon was transferred to another unit in Celle. He came into contact with the group The Anyones in Hanover, becoming the singer and lead guitarist. He decided to continue his music career and again left the troupe without permission. After his time with The Anyones, he formed his own band, The John Simon Set.

After four years away from his platoon, Symon was finally picked up in 1970 and sent to Colchester for 3 months in a Military Corrective Training Centre and subsequently discharged. He returned directly to Germany and spent a year at an art school in Hanover.

== Musical activity ==
During this time, he already began to perform as the one-man band Rasputin. A drum kit he designed was equipped with special mechanics, guitar and bass came from a rebuilt Fender Telecaster. As Rasputin, as well as under the name Jon Symon's One Man Band, he mostly covered songs by well-known groups, using his instruments to replace the sound of a full band. He toured Germany and Austria, appeared on ARD's Musikladen in 1973, and subsequently made several television appearances, such as on the ZDF music programme disco in 1976, as well as on other programmes in Germany and in Austria. In the 1970s, he released several singles.

In 1978, he met music publisher Michael Mellenthin, who co-owned a recording studio that Symon was allowed to use. The concept album Warlock - Memories of a White Magician was created, featuring bassist Klaus-Peter Matziol, keyboardist Detlev Schmidtchen of Eloy, and violinist Hajo Hoffmann and Jim McGillivray of Epitaph as drummer. The album was released in 1981.

In the early 1980s, Alexander May, artistic director of the Schauspielhaus Hanover, became aware of Symon and brought him together with the ballet director Lothar Höfgen. Symon (lyrics and music) and Höfgen (choreography) jointly produced the rock ballet Warlock, which premiered in March 1983 at the sold-out Congress Centrum in Hanover.

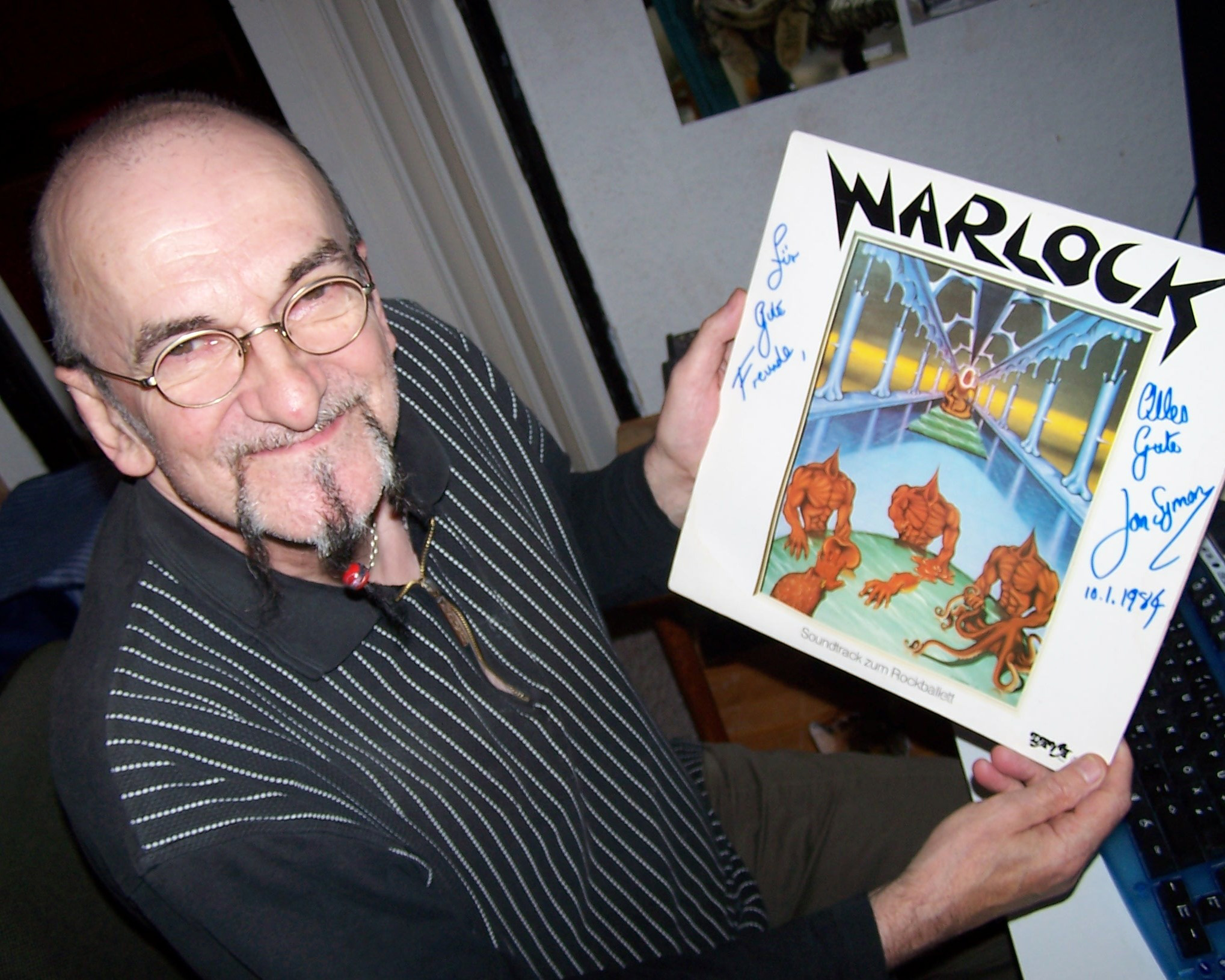
Jon Symon (2003) with the album Warlock - The Rock Ballet

At all performances of Warlock the music was played live by the rock group Warlock, consisting of Symon (vocals), three members of the then disbanded German rock band Jane - Peter Panka (drums), Werner Nadolny (saxophone and synthesizer) and Charly Maucher (bass) - as well as guitarist Detlef Klamann (later with the reformed Jane).

Among the guests of honour at the premiere were the then-prime minister of Lower Saxony Ernst Albrecht, the lord mayor of Hanover Herbert Schmalstieg and the group Scorpions.

Due to the unexpected success of the ballet, the musicians of the live band recorded a studio version of the songs from the ballet as an album "on the fly" at the end of March 1983. The rock ballet Warlock became a hit piece. Originally intended for only 3 evenings of ballet, it ultimately remained in the repertoire of the Niedersächsisches Staatstheater (State Theatre of Lower Saxony) for two years, with all performances in Hanover being sold out. The farewell performance of Warlock in Hanover, which took place in June 1984 in the Sportpark Hanover as an open-air performance, was attended by around 7000 guests. There were also several guest performances of the rock ballet throughout Germany, such as at the International Congress Centrum Berlin (ICC) in Berlin, the Alte Oper in Frankfurt, the Congress Center Hamburg (CCH) in Hamburg and the Deutsches Museum in Munich.

This was followed in 1984 by the premiere of the rock ballet Lady MacBeth, also produced by Jon Symon and Lothar Höfgen. The premiere took place again in the Kuppelsaal, Hanover. This time, in order not to repeat the same mistake of producing an album only after the premiere, Symon, together with his Warlock musicians, recorded a corresponding studio album to Lady MacBeth in advance of the premiere. During 1987 Symon began writing the third part of his ballet trilogy entitled Stonehenge. In early 1988, an article appeared in the Hanover newspaper Neue Presse that the piece was complete, Symon only needed a touring company (dancers and musicians) and a suitable choreographer. However, the piece was never performed during his lifetime.

On 5 November 1985, a one-off revival of the rock ballet Warlock took place at the Eureka conference in Hanover. The Minister President of Lower Saxony, Ernst Albrecht, had invited the entire ensemble on the occasion of this conference, where the work was presented once again in front of 36 European delegations.

Since the 1990s Symon has written and directed rock musicals and other rock-oriented projects in Hanover and the surrounding area, such as the rock ballet Beachy Head choreographed by Sylvie Zander in 1994 and the rock ballet Tarot in 1995. In 1996, he wrote the rock-grusical Bats in the Belfry. These works were each staged at the Theater am Aegi in Hanover, among other things.

Symon founded the rock duo Demon Angel together with Alexandra Süllow in 1998 and brought out the revue Himmlische Teufeleien with Demon Angel, Thommi Baake, Diego Leon, Masoud Zand and Andy Clapp in 1999. This was followed in 2003 by Schwarzer Engel, a "grusical" composed by him and directed by Süllow. In 2003, he formed the duo Elfenlicht with Janina Gorski, with whom he brought out the musical Spiders.

In 2005, the idea for Vox Nocturna was born and he composed the concept album Legends by the end of 2007. Ancient legends, myths and pirate stories fascinated Symon and have been musically processed by him several times; for Legends he wrote songs about the "legends of the earth". He described his current music, which contained elements of folk, metal and medieval musical sounds and which can be classified as belonging to the symphonic metal style, as "Symphonic Pirate Metal". His new band Jon Symon's Vox Nocturna with Leandra Low (aka Alexandra Süllow) (vocals), Thomas St. Jones (keyboard), Wolfgang Schneider (drums) and Anja Fünfziger (backing vocals) played live for the first time in December 2008. Since 2008, Symon was also back on stage as his one-man band Rasputin and served the genre symphonic rock in particular with his 1970s show.

In 2009, he disbanded Vox Nocturna shortly before the release of the new concept album Legends and went back into the studio, where he reworked all the tracks on the album with singers Sonja Schott and Janina Gorski (former duo partner in Elfenlicht) until September 2010. During a visit to England, he met the drummer of his first band The Demons from the 1960s in Liverpool. The band member Carl Hardin had found him again after 45 years via the internet. At the reunion of The Demons, Symon agreed with Hardin and with electric bassist John Cross, who came from Standish near Liverpool, to collaborate on his new project Legends. By 2012, the line-up of the Jon Symon Band consisted of: Jon Symon (guitars, vocals), Sonja Schott (vocals), Janina Gorski (vocals), Carl Hardin (drums) and John Cross (bass guitar).

In 2012, Symon produced the track "The Revenge of Medusa" with singer Ivonne Resigkeit under his pseudonym Rasputin, which was also released as a video. In 2013, Jon Symon & The Pirates From Hell was created, a trio with Jon Symon (vocals, guitar, bass effects, bagpipes, choirs), Vanz Oliver Sheridan (drums, background vocals) and Frank Perrey (guitar, noise machine). At this performance at the GIG in Hannover-Linden, Symon also gave his last concert as the one-man band "Rasputin".

== Death and posthumous productions ==
Jon Symon returned to the Isle of Wight in 2014 for hospital treatment due to his deteriorating health. He died there of cancer on 7 December 2015. He was married three times and leaves a son from his first marriage. His plans to re-record the Warlock-era tracks could not be realised.

Peer Olsen, a teacher at the comprehensive school IGS Roderbruch in Hanover, discovered the music of this third part in the Hanover Theatre Archive in 2016, obtained the performance rights for IGS Roderbruch and successfully staged the world premiere with pupils on 22 March 2017. Symon's music was partially rearranged and played by the school's own band.

In 2022, the first two parts of Jon Symon's rock ballet trilogy, Warlock - Memories of a White Magician and Lady MacBeth were reissued in a remastered version by the English label Explore Rights Management, with Warlock as a double CD containing both the 1981 version and the 1983 version.

In November 2023, Explore Rights Management also released Jon Symon's Warlock - Anthology exclusively as a download version on all common streaming portals. This compilation contains, among other titles two previously unreleased recordings (666, Night of the Demon), the B-side Robot Man of the 1981 single Lady Macbeth, which has not yet appeared on any album, demo outtakes of the not yet released Jon Symon original rock ballet Stonehenge (Posedian's Island, Some went to Africa, Tributes, Fire in the Sky) and two live recordings from 2007, which were previously only available on the DVD Tribute To Peter Panka by Jane (Angel of Death, Morgan Le Fay).

== Stage productions ==
- 1983: Warlock (Memories of a White Magician) – a rock ballet (premiere on 1 March 1983, Kuppelsaal Hannover)
- 1984: Lady MacBeth – a rock ballet (premiere on 27 September 1984, Kuppelsaal, Hanover)
- 1994: Beachy Head –a rock ballet (premiere on 3 February 1994, Theatre Am Aegi, Hanover)
- 1995: Tarot –a rock ballet (premiere on 14 October 1995, Theatre Am Spalterhals [auditorium in the school centre Am Spalterhals], Barsinghausen)
- 1996: Bats in the Belfry – a rock ballet-"grusical" (premiere on 5 October 1996, Theatre Am Spalterhals [auditorium in the school centre Am Spalterhals], Barsinghausen, with the Calenberg Dance Theatre)
- 1999: Himmlische Teufeleien – a revue (premiere on 6 March 1999, Theatre Am Spalterhals [auditorium in the school centre Am Spalterhals], Barsinghausen)
- 2003: Schwarzer Engel – an erotic-gothic-crusical (premiere on 5 April 2003, Zechensaal, Barsinghausen)
- 2005: Spiders – a musical for humans and marionettes (premiere in 2005, Barsinghausen)
- 2017: Stonehenge – a rock ballet (world premiere on 22 March 2017, IGS Roderbruch, Hanover)

== Discography ==
=== Singles ===
- 1973: Rasputin – "Chicken Song / Spoonful"
- 1973: Jon Symon's One Man Band – "Sweet Eliza (Give Up Your Rubber Man) / Greenhorn"
- 1974: Jon Symon's One Man Band – "Mighty Quinn / Shangri-la"
- 1975: Jon Symon – "Silver Star (part 1) / Silver Star (part 2)"
- 1975: Jon Symon – "Ich Wär So Gern Ein Millionär / Auf Der Grünen Wiese"
- 1977: Rasputin – "Freedom On The Road / Sympathy For The Devil"
- 1979: Rasputin – "Raggaephone / Merlin"
- 1981: Jon Symon Alias Rasputin – Lady Macbeth / Robot Man"

=== Albums ===
- 1981: Warlock – Memories of a White Magician
- 1983: Warlock – The Rockballet
- 1984: Jon Symon's Warlock – Lady Macbeth
- 1992: Beachy Head
- 1996: Bats in the Belfry
- 1996: Tarot
- 2000: Demon Angel – Himmlische Teufeleien
- 2000: Warlock - Memories of a White Magician (remastered version, Magic Minds Records, XL20011MMR)
- 2010: Legends (MP3 album, LAVA)
- 2022: Jon Symon's Warlock – Memories of a White Magician (remastered version, double CD, Explore Rights Management)
- 2022: Jon Symon's Warlock – Lady Macbeth (remastered version, Explore Rights Management)
- 2023: Jon Symon's Warlock – Anthology (only download version, Explore Rights Management)
