= Junta =

Junta may refer to:

== Government and military ==
- Junta (governing body) (from Spanish), the name of various historical and current governments and governing institutions, including civil ones
  - Military junta, one form of junta and the common sense in English, a military government
- Junta (Habsburg), an administrative body that ruled in personal union with the Spanish Habsburgs
- Junta (Peninsular War), resistance governments in Spain during the Peninsular War
- Junta (Spanish American Independence), resistance governments during the Spanish American wars of independence including the Cuban Junta
- Junta Patriótica; see Cuban National Party
- Cantón de Nuevo México, also known as Junta Popular, resistance government in New Mexico during the 1837 Rio Arriba Rebellion
- Whig Junto, early 18th century political faction

== Arts and entertainment ==
- Junta (album), a 1989 album by Phish
- Junta (game), a board game from West End Games
- Junta (comics), a fictional Marvel Comics character
- The Junta of the Philippines, an 1815 painting by Francisco Goya

== People ==
- Junta Kosuda, Japanese para snowboarder
- Junta Miyawaki, Japanese professional wrestler
- Junta Terashima, Japanese voice actor
- Thomas Junta, American hockey dad attacked and killed the referee in his son's pickup hockey game
- La Junta Indians, Indians living in La Junta de los Rios on the West Texas and Mexico border

== Fictional characters ==
- Junta Shirashi, a character from the manga and anime series Kubo Won't Let Me Be Invisible

== Places ==
=== United States ===
- La Junta, Colorado
  - La Junta Gardens, Colorado
  - North La Junta, Colorado
  - La Junta Municipal Airport
- Junta, West Virginia
- Pueblo de las Juntas, California

=== Other places ===
- Junta de Traslaloma, Spain
- Junta de Villalba de Losa, Spain
- Parque la Junta, Mexico
- Primera Junta (Buenos Aires Underground), Argentina

== Other uses ==
- Junta (trade unionism), a group of New Model Unionists
- Giunti (printers), Florentine family of printers, also spelled Junta

== See also ==
- Junto (disambiguation)
- Janata (disambiguation)
