= Juntos =

Juntos ("together" in Spanish) may refer to:

- "Juntos (Together)", a 2015 song by Juanes
- Juntos, a 2009 film by Nicolás Pereda

== See also ==
- Junto (disambiguation)
- Juntos Otra Vez (disambiguation)
- Together (disambiguation)
