= Forever Together (disambiguation) =

"Forever Together" is a 1991 song by Randy Travis.

Forever Together may also refer to:

- Forever Together (film) or Can't Be Heaven, a 1999 American film
- Forever Together (American horse) (foaled 2004), a Thoroughbred racehorse
- Forever Together (Irish horse) (foaled 2015), a Thoroughbred racehorse

== See also ==
- Together Forever (disambiguation)
