= Juntos Otra Vez =

Juntos Otra Vez may refer to:

- Juntos Otra Vez (Juan Gabriel and Rocío Dúrcal album), 1997
- Juntos Otra Vez (Los Bukis and Los Yonic's album), 1989
