= Together Forever =

Together Forever may refer to:

== Film and television ==
- Together Forever (film), a 1987 LDS Church film
- Together Forever (TV series), a 2012 Philippine romance comedy-drama television series broadcast by GMA Network
- "Together Forever" (Degrassi: The Next Generation), an episode of Degrassi: The Next Generation

== Music ==
=== Albums ===
- Together Forever (Lisette Melendez album), 1991
- Together Forever (The Marshall Tucker Band album), 1978
- Together Forever: Greatest Hits 1983–1991, by Run-D.M.C., 1991
- Together Forever – Greatest Hits and More..., by Rick Astley, 2000

=== Songs ===
- "Together Forever" (The Cyber Pet Song), 1998
- "Together Forever" (Lisette Melendez song), 1991
- "Together Forever" (Rick Astley song), 1988
- "Together Forever", by Dolly Parton from I Believe in You, 2017
- "Together Forever", by Rab Noakes from Fog on the Tyne, 1971
- "Together Forever", written by Harvey Schmidt and Tom Jones, from the musical I Do! I Do!, 1966
- "Together Forever", by Rico J. Puno, 1982
- "Together Forever", from the Pokémon TV series soundtrack Pokémon 2.B.A. Master, 1999
- "Together Forever", from the Sesame Street film The Adventures of Elmo in Grouchland, 1999
- "Together Forever", from the Disney Channel TV series The Ghost and Molly McGee, 2021
- "Together Forever", from the Sinners film soundtrack, 2025

== Other ==
- Together Forever (horse), an Irish Thoroughbred racehorse
- Together Forever (Disney), a multimedia nighttime show at Disneyland for part of 2018

== See also ==
- Forever Together (disambiguation)
- Together (disambiguation)
