= Together Again =

Together Again may refer to:

== Film and television ==
- Together Again (film), a 1944 comedy directed by Charles Vidor
- Together Again (TV series), a 1957 British comedy/variety show
- "Together Again" (Adventure Time: Distant Lands), a 2021 TV episode
- "Together Again" (Hi-de-Hi!), a 1984 TV episode
- "Together Again" (Star Wars: The Clone Wars), a 2020 TV episode

== Music ==
=== Albums ===
- Together Again (Buck Owens album) or the title song (see below), 1964; covered by many
- Together Again (Daniel O'Donnell album), 2007
- Together Again (The Dubliners album), 1979
- Together Again (Emil Viklický and George Mraz album), 2014
- Together Again (George Jones and Tammy Wynette album), 1980
- Together Again (Kitty Wells and Red Foley album), 1967
- Together Again (Michael Ball and Alfie Boe album), 2017
- Together Again (Ray Charles album), 1965
- Together Again (The Temptations album), 1987
- Together Again (Tony Bennett and Bill Evans album), 1977
- Together Again!, by Willis Jackson and Jack McDuff, 1965
- Together Again!!!!, by Howard McGhee and Teddy Edwards, or the title track, 1961
- Together Again: For the First Time, by Mel Tormé and the Buddy Rich Band, 1978
- Together Again for the First Time, by Pulley, 2001
- Together Again for the Last Time, by Sonny Stitt and Gene Ammons, 1976
- Together Again: Live at the Montreux Jazz Festival '82, by the Modern Jazz Quartet, 1982
- Together Again, Again, by Willis Jackson and Jack McDuff, 1966
- Together Again, by the Guess Who, 1984
- Together Again, by Mungo Jerry, 1981

=== Songs ===
- "Together Again" (Buck Owens song), 1964
- "Together Again" (Hank Smith song), 1972
- "Together Again" (Janet Jackson song), 1997
- "Together Again" (NSYNC song), 1997
- "Together Again", by Evanescence, a non-album track from The Open Door, 2006
- "Together Again", by Dave Koz from The Dance, 1999
- "Together Again", by Mike Candys with Evelyn, 2011
- "Together Again", by Mink, 2007
- "Together Again", by Sash! from Trilenium, 2000
- "Together Again", written by Mel Brooks, from the musical Young Frankenstein, 2007
- "Together Again", written by Jeff Moss, from The Muppets Take Manhattan, 1984

== See also ==
- Together (disambiguation)
