= Erik Per Sullivan =

American former actor (born 1991)

- Born: July 12, 1991 (age 35); Worcester, Massachusetts, U.S.
- Occupation: Actor
- Years active: 1998–2010
- Known for: Dewey in Malcolm in the Middle
- Martial arts career
- Rank: 1st dan–Taekwondo

Erik Per Sullivan (born July 12, 1991) is an American former actor. He is best known for his role as Dewey on the Fox series Malcolm in the Middle (2000–2006).

== Early life and education ==
Erik Per Sullivan was born on July 12, 1991, in Worcester, Massachusetts, the only child of his mother, Ann, born in Sweden and naturalized as an American citizen in 2007, and Fred Sullivan, of Irish descent, who owned a Mexican eatery called The Alamo. He speaks a little Swedish and his family visits Sweden almost every year. At a young age, he began studying piano and the saxophone. He has a 1st dan black belt in Taekwondo.

Per Sullivan studied at the Mount Saint Charles Academy, in Rhode Island, and Phillips Exeter Academy in New Hampshire. Beginning in 2009, he attended the University of Southern California in Los Angeles. By 2026, he was studying at Harvard University.

== Career ==
From January 9, 2000, to May 14, 2006, Per Sullivan appeared in the Fox sitcom Malcolm in the Middle as Malcolm's younger brother Dewey. In 2005, along with Malcolm co-star Jane Kaczmarek, he wrote the afterword to the children's book Together, which is about farming and was inspired by the nonprofit organization Heifer International.

Per Sullivan had a starring role in the 2004 movie Christmas with the Kranks and has played a variety of characters in film and on television, including the title role in the independent film Mo (2007), as well as voicing Sheldon the Seahorse in both the animated film Finding Nemo and its video game tie-in.

Per Sullivan's last acting credit was an appearance in the 2010 film Twelve when he was 18 years old. He has since kept a low profile, and has been absent from several Malcolm in the Middle cast reunions. Per Sullivan also did not return for the show's revival, Malcolm in the Middle: Life's Still Unfair, with Caleb Ellsworth-Clark taking over the role of Dewey. Kaczmarek said in 2025 that Per Sullivan was studying Victorian literature. He turned down a chance at participating in the revival because it would take him away from his studies. Despite his lack of involvement, he has reportedly remained supportive of his former castmates and the show's legacy.

== Filmography ==
=== Film ===
Year	Title	Role	Notes
1998	Armageddon	Kid with Rocket Ship	Uncredited
1999	The Cider House Rules	Fuzzy	
2001	Wendigo	Miles	
2001	Joe Dirt	Little Joe Dirt	
2002	Unfaithful	Charlie Sumner	
2003	Finding Nemo	Sheldon (voice)	
2004	Christmas with the Kranks	Spike Frohmeyer	
2006	Arthur and the Minimoys	Mino (voice)	
2006	Once Not Far from Home	The Little Boy	Short film
2007	Mo	Mo	
2010	Twelve	Timmy	

=== Television ===
Year	Title	Role	Notes
2000	Wonderland	Tucker Banger	Pilot
2000–2006	Malcolm in the Middle	Dewey	151 episodes
2001	Black of Life	Jimmy	Unknown episode
2002	The King of Queens	Young Arthur	Episode: "Shrink Wrap"
2006	Come On Over	Young Luis	Unknown episode

== Awards and nominations ==
Awards
Year	Result	Award	Category	Nominated work
2000	Won	YoungStar Awards	Best Young Ensemble Cast: Television	Malcolm in the Middle
2001	Nominated	Young Artist Awards	Best Ensemble in a TV Series (Drama or Comedy)	Malcolm in the Middle
2001	Nominated	Young Artist Awards	Best Performance in a TV Series (Comedy or Drama): Young Actor Age Ten or Under	Malcolm in the Middle
2001	Nominated	Teen Choice Awards	TV: Choice Sidekick	Malcolm in the Middle
2002	Nominated	Young Artist Awards	Best Ensemble in a TV Series (Comedy or Drama)	Malcolm in the Middle
2002	Nominated	Young Artist Awards	Best Performance in a TV Series (Comedy or Drama): Young Actor Age Ten or Under	Malcolm in the Middle
2002	Nominated	Teen Choice Awards	TV: Choice Sidekick	Malcolm in the Middle
2003	Won	Young Artist Awards	Best Ensemble in a TV Series (Comedy or Drama)	Malcolm in the Middle
2003	Nominated	Teen Choice Awards	TV: Choice Sidekick	Malcolm in the Middle
