= Junto =

Junto may refer to:

- Whig Junto (c. 1700), English political leaders' group, that began to dominate the ministry from 1693 and held onto power intermittently until 1717 when members of the group fell out
- Junto (club) (c. 1730), a Philadelphia club started by Benjamin Franklin
- Junto (album), the seventh album by Basement Jaxx

== People with the given name ==
- Junto Matsushita (松下 純土; born 1991), Japanese footballer
- Junto Nakatani (中谷 潤人; born 1998), Japanese professional boxer
- Junto Taguchi (田口 潤人; born 1996), Japanese footballer

== See also ==
- Junta (disambiguation)
- Juntos (disambiguation)
