= Togetherness =

Togetherness may refer to:

- Solidarity

== Film and TV ==
- Togetherness (film), a 1970 film by Arthur Marks
- Togetherness Supreme, a 2010 Kenyan film
- Togetherness (TV series), a 2015 HBO series

== Music ==
=== Albums ===
- Togetherness (Don Cherry album), 1966
- Togetherness, a 1967 album by Allan Sherman
- Togetherness (L.T.D. album), 1978
- Togetherness, a 1960 album by Lenny Bruce
- Togetherness, a 2003 album by Gretchen Phillips
- Togetherness, a 2005 album by Ronnie Aldrich

=== Songs ===
- "Togetherness", a 1955 song by Johnny Desmond
- "Togetherness", a 1958 song by Andy Griffith
- "Togetherness", a 1960 song by Frankie Avalon
  - covered by Michael Preston, 1960
- "Togetherness", a 1968 song by Freddie Hart
  - covered in 1970 by Buck Owens and Susan Raye
- "Togetherness", a 1975 song by reggae singer Clinton Fearon
- "Togetherness", a 1977 song by Horace Silver
- "Togetherness", a 2010 song by The New Pornographers
- "Togetherness", a song by Ray Charles on the 1973 album Jazz Number II
- "Togetherness", a song by Don Cherry from the albums Togetherness (1966) and Orient (1974)

== See also ==
- Together (disambiguation)
