= Lo Romántico de Los Bukis =

Compilation album by Los Bukis
- Released: 1989
- Recorded: 1976–1988
- Genre: Grupero
- Length: 37:57
- Label: Fonovisa
- Producer: Marco Antonio Solís

Los Bukis chronology
| Juntos Otra Vez (1989) | Lo Romántico de Los Bukis (1989) | Y Para Siempre (1989) |

Lo Romántico de Los Bukis ("The Romantic of Los Bukis") is a compilation album released by Mexican band Los Bukis in 1989.

== Track listing ==
All tracks are written by Marco Antonio Solís

| No. | Title | Length |
|---|---|---|
| 1. | "Tu Cárcel" | 3:32 |
| 2. | "Que Lástima" | 3:41 |
| 3. | "A Dónde Vas" | 4:03 |
| 4. | "Necesita de Ti" | 3:32 |
| 5. | "Loco Por Ti" | 3:50 |
| 6. | "Y Ahora Te Vas" | 3:55 |
| 7. | "No Me Arrepiento" | 5:02 |
| 8. | "Me Volvi a Acordar de Ti" | 3:27 |
| 9. | "Como Me Haces Falta" | 3:55 |
| 10. | "Una Noche Come Ésta" | 3:00 |
