= 2gether =

2gether may refer to:

- 2gether (band), an American fictional boy band, and associated TV film and series
  - 2gether (2gether album), the band's first studio album
  - 2gether: Again, 2000 album by 2gether
  - 2gether: The Series (American TV series), 2000 American sitcom
- 2gether (Warren Vaché and Bill Charlap album), 2001
- 2gether (CNBLUE album), 2015 album
- "2gether" (song), by Roger Sanchez and Far East Movement, 2011
- "2gether", a song by the New Power Generation from their 1993 album Goldnigga
- "2Gether (Enterlude)", a song by Steve Lacy from his 2022 album Gemini Rights
- ^{2}gether NHS Foundation Trust
- 2gether: The Series, a 2020 Thai television series
  - Still 2gether, a 2020 Thai television series and sequel
  - 2gether: The Movie, a 2021 Thai film

== See also ==
- Together (disambiguation)
