= To Get Her =

To Get Her may refer to:

- To Get Her Together, 2011 studio album by Dutch singer Anouk
- To.get.her, 2011 American mystery thriller film directed by Erica Dunton
- To Get Her (TV series), a Chinese series featuring Tang Xiaotian

== See also ==
- Together (disambiguation)
