= Los Yonic's =

Mexican Grupero band

Los Yonic's (or Los Yonics) are a Mexican grupero band formed in 1975.

Los Yonic's began playing together in San Luis San Pedro but later moved to Acapulco, playing both tropical pop music and ballads. Their music became very popular among American Hispanics in cities such as Los Angeles, San Jose, Phoenix, Arizona, and El Paso. They had a string of #1 albums on the Billboard Regional Mexican charts in the 1980s, and have continued to enjoy chart success on the American market since. José Manuel Zamacona, founder and lead singer of the band, died of complications from COVID-19 on July 4, 2021, after being hospitalized since May 27 of that year.

== Members ==
- Johnny Ayvar - drums, musical director
- José Manuel Zamacona (deceased) - lead vocals, guitar
- Martín Serrano - piano, bass
- Bruno Ayvar - bass, vocals
- Óscar Pérez - keyboards
- Eduardo Rincón - saxophone, flute
- Francisco Hernández - saxophone, flute
- José Santos Moreno - guitar
- Rodolfo Luviano - piano

== Discography ==
=== Albums ===
==== Que lo Sepa el Mundo (1975) ====
1. Caminos Diferentes
2. El Carretón
3. El Cerrajero
4. El Tiburón Coscolino
5. Jugueteando con María
6. Lindo Sueño
7. Mi Castigo
8. Que lo Sepa el Mundo
9. Tendrás un Altar
10. Tu Amor No Me Interesa

==== Soy Yo (1976) ====
1. Soy Yo
2. A Tu Recuerdo
3. Perla
4. El Bobo de la Yuca
5. Y Así Quedé
6. El Tamarindo
7. Así Te Quiero
8. Dime Dicen Diles
9. El Botoncito

==== Tres Tristes Tigres (1978) ====
1. Tres Tristes Tigres
2. Ya No Llores Corazón
3. Blanca Estela
4. Triste Despedida
5. La Vida del Campesino
6. Volveré Porque Te Quiero
7. Bongo y Tequila
8. Oh Humanidad
9. La Picosita
10. Virgen

==== El Fantasma (1979) ====
1. Pobres Niños
2. Agüita de Cu
3. Cada Cosa
4. Paloma sin Nido
5. Te Vas a Casar
6. El Fantasma
7. El Carrizal
8. Puerto de Ilusión
9. No Te Confundas
10. Amor Fracasado

==== Sólo Baladas (1980) ====
1. Muchacha Mágica
2. Me Gustas Como Eres
3. Tu, Yo y Nuestro Amor
4. Amor Extraño
5. Quiero Despertar
6. Palabras Tristes
7. Con el Alma en la Mano
8. Me Falta Tu Presencia
9. Desde Hoy
10. Que Sea lo que Será

==== Le Falta Un Clavo a Mi Cruz (1981) ====
1. Le Falta Un Clavo a Mi Cruz
2. Cosas
3. El Pechugón
4. China de los Ojos Negros
5. Regresa
6. El Atarantado
7. La Negra Interesada
8. La Venus de Oro
9. El Último Rodeo

==== En Su Punto (1982) ====
1. Rosas Blancas
2. Dónde
3. Ámame y Después Tú Sabrás
4. Nuestra Entrega
5. Te Quiero Cada Día Más
6. Chaqui (New Kid In Town)
7. Un Día Más
8. Marisela
9. Esperando Tu Regreso
10. Ya Se Fué

==== Con Amor (1983) ====
1. Y Te Amo
2. Somos Ajenos
3. Dime con Quién
4. ¿Dónde Estás?
5. Te Dí
6. En la Estación
7. Pero No Me Engañes
8. Entrégate
9. Mi Canción (Te Dedico Esta Canción)
10. Ni Tu Amigo Ni Tu Amante

==== Pero No Me Dejes (1984) ====
1. Títere
2. Si Tú Quisieras
3. La Pochita
4. Siempre Aventura
5. Te Vas a Casar
6. Aléjate
7. Cariño Compartido
8. He Nacido Para Tí
9. Herido de Muerte
10. Pero No Me Dejes

==== Déjame Vivír (1985) ====
1. Déjame Vivír
2. Amiga Casualidad
3. Nadie Sabe lo que Tiene
4. Dime Amorcito Por Qué
5. Sabes Que Te Quiero
6. Porque Te Quiero
7. Díganle
8. Un Dolor
9. La Codorníz
10. Castillos

==== Corazón Vacío (1986) ====
1. Adilene
2. Corazón Vacío
3. Mejor Me Regreso
4. Dile que Cante
5. Aunque No lo Creas
6. Lástima de Amor
7. Que Más Da
8. El Botoncito
9. Ahora Sé
10. Necio Corazón

En Esta Navidad (released in the 1997 reissue)

Reissued 1997 as Aunque No lo Creas on Econolinea, eliminating "El Botoncito", replaced with "En Esta Navidad".

==== Pétalo y Espinas (1987) ====
1. Obligado Por Amor
2. Si No Me Querías
3. Tu Príncipe Azul
4. Abrázame
5. Pétalo y Espinas
6. Quinceañera
7. Veneno Pa' Mi Dolor
8. Te Vino Grande la Corona
9. La Güera Salió Güero
10. Frágil Como el Cristal

==== Siempre Te Amaré (1988) ====
1. Tu Presa Fácil
2. No Me Dejes Solo
3. Falsas Promesas
4. Lo Bonito del Amor
5. Siempre Te Amaré
6. Olvídame
7. Inolvidable Amor
8. El Conquistador
9. Perdón Por Tus Lágrimas
10. Me Haces Falta

==== A Tu Recuerdo (1989) ====
1. Acábame de Matar
2. Dónde Quedó el Amor
3. Vuelve
4. No le Digas
5. A Tu Recuerdo
6. Triste Desengaño
7. Inesperado Adiós
8. Frente a Frente
9. Se Hubiera Ido Sola
10. Muchacha Bonita

== Track listing ==
No.	Title	Writer(s)	Length
1.	"Déjame Vivir"	Los Yonic's	3:21
2.	"Tus Mentiras"	Los Bukis	4:46
3.	"Petalo y Espinas"	Los Yonic's	3:26
4.	"Tu Carcel"	Los Bukis	3:30
5.	"Si Tu Quisieras"	Los Yonic's	3:12
6.	"Me Volvi a Acordar de Ti"	Los Bukis	3:27
7.	"Tu Presa Facil"	Los Yonic's	3:58
8.	"Y Ahora Te Vas"	Los Bukis	3:51
9.	"Obligado Por Amor"	Los Yonic's	3:23
10.	"Este Adios"	Los Bukis	3:15
11.	"Perdon Por Tus Lagrimas"	Los Yonic's	3:58
12.	"Que Mala"	Los Bukis	3:17

=== 15 Aniversario (1990) ===
Special album or remastered songs and re-recordings with cuerda real and orchestra.

1. Que lo Sepa el Mundo
2. Volveré Porque Te Quiero
3. Soy Yo
4. Así Te Quiero
5. Me Gustas Como Eres
6. Palabras Tristes
7. Con el Alma en la Mano
8. Rosas Blancas
9. Un Dolor
10. Y Te Amo
11. Nadie Sabe lo que Tiene
12. Títere
13. Corazón Vacío
14. Pétalo y Espinas
15. Tu Presa Fácil
16. Frente a Frente

=== ¿Por Qué Volví Contigo? (1991) ===
1. ¿Por Qué Volví Contigo?
2. Ella No es Culpable
3. Juan el Cartero
4. ¿Qué Hago Yo?
5. Luz de un Solo Instante
6. Perdón Mi Dios
7. Recordando Mi Canción
8. Las Baileras
9. Triste Nostalgia
10. Mírate al Espejo

=== Volveré A Conquistarte (1992) ===
1. Pero Te Vas a Arrepentír (feat. Marco Antonio Solís)
2. Lágrimas Frente Al Mar
3. Corazón Prohibido
4. De Puntitas
5. Volveré a Conquistarte
6. Abranme Que Vengo Herido
7. Te Llamo Para Despedirme
8. Veneno
9. Si Pudiera Cambiar de Corazón
10. Viejos Recuerdos

=== Siempre Te Recordaré (1993) ===
1. Dime
2. Aunque Sé Perder
3. Esclavo de Tu Amor
4. Siempre Te Recordaré
5. Contigo
6. Es Mejor Para los Dos (featuring Ana Bárbara)
7. Mentiras
8. El Albañil
9. A Quién le Puedo Contar
10. Cuando los Hombres Lloran

=== Enamorados (1994) ===
1. No Más Boleros
2. Hoy Despierta un Corazón
3. Eres
4. Quisiera Amarte Menos
5. Sin Tí
6. Enamorado
7. Arrepentido Estoy
8. Eres Todo Para Mí
9. Por Primera Vez Soy Fiel
10. Te Vas Amor
11. Llora Conmigo

=== Mal Herido (1995) ===
1. Perdóname
2. ¿Cómo Dejar de Amarte?
3. Me Dejó Plantado
4. Entre Lilas y Rosas
5. Mal Herido
6. ¿Cómo Decirle?
7. A Punto de Llorar
8. Más Vale Solo
9. Fruto del Árbol Prohibido
10. Tu Juguete

=== Linea De Oro: Los Yonics (Compilation) (1995) ===
1. No Más Boleros
2. Un Dolor
3. Pétalo y Espinas
4. Títere
5. Diganle
6. Palabras Tristes
7. Ni Tu Amigo, Ni Tu Amante
8. Obligado Por Amor
9. Dime
10. Tu Presa Facil
11. Soy Yo
12. Y Te Amo
13. Rosas Blancas
14. Pero Te Vas a Arrepentir (feat. Marco Antonio Solís
15. Lágrimas Frente Al Mar
16. Perdón Por Tus Lágrimas

=== Quien Lo Diria (1996) ===
1. Quien Lo Diria
2. Una Lágrima
3. Eres Mía
4. Mi Niña Mimada
5. En Pausa
6. Un Mundo de Risas Y Sueños
7. Tu Cobardía
8. Has Vuelto Abrir La Herida
9. Siénteme
10. Tu No Tienes La Culpa
11. Que Nos Paso
12. Solo

=== No Me Cortes Las Alas (1997) ===
1. No Me Cortes Las Alas
2. Lo Que No Es Mio
3. Rondando Tu Esquina
4. Mujeres
5. Una Propuesta de Amor
6. Porqué No Estás Conmigo
7. Locamente Enamorado
8. Silvia
9. Mi Mayor Deseo
10. Amigos No

=== Nuestras Consentidas y Tú... Con Mariachi (1998) ===
1. Adiós Adiós, Amor
2. Candilejas
3. Yo Te Amo
4. Lo Que Te Queda
5. Será Mejor que te Vayas
6. Corazón Mágico
7. Ella ya Me Olidó
8. Para Que No Me Olvides
9. Espumas
10. Brindo Por Tu Compleaños

=== Me Acordé de Tí (2000) ===
1. ¿Y Cómo Fué?
2. La Ingratitud
3. El Corazón Me Está Doliendo
4. No Me Mientas
5. Cama Tibia
6. Los Cuernos (featuring José Guadalupe Esparza)
7. Me Acordé de Ti
8. Señor del Universo
9. El Último en Saberlo
10. Me Estoy Volviendo Loco

=== Viajero del Amor (2001) ===
1. Como las Violetas (Come le viole)
2. La Distancia es Como el Viento (La lontananza)
3. Me Enamoro de Ti (M'innamoro di te)
4. El Mundo (Il mondo)
5. Será Porque Te Amo (Sarà perché ti amo)
6. De Rodillas (In ginocchio da te)
7. Mamma María (Mamma Maria)
8. Cómo Has Hecho (Come hai fatto)
9. Cuerpo Sin Alma (Bella senz'anima)
10. Que Me Importa del Mundo (Che m'importa del mondo)

=== Como Amigos (2002) ===
1. Como Amigos (featuring José Manuel Zamacona)
2. Regresa Con Tu Amor
3. Y Por Primera Vez
4. En Cada Segundo
5. Quién
6. Se Renta Está Casa
7. Aún Le Llevo Rosas
8. Por Jugar Con el Amor
9. Que Nos Dejen Vive
10. Llorando A Carcajadas
11. Sobredosis
12. Tonto

=== Sueños (Los Yonic's album) (2003) ===
1. La Que Me Hizo Llorar
2. En Un Hilo
3. Nadie Como Tú
4. Sueños
5. Ni La Busco, Ni Vuelvo
6. Amor Perdoname
7. El Que Busca Encuentra
8. Entre Pobres
9. No Pude Decirle Que No
10. Es Mi Amor Secreto

=== Inmune A Nada (2013) ===
1. Y Cuando Estés Con Él
2. En Pausa
3. Me Partiste el Alma
4. Regalo de Amor
5. Doy Todo Por Tenerte
6. Sí Como No
7. Para Olvidar Que Me Olvidas
8. Pero Nunca Se lo Digas
9. Inmune A Nada
10. Y Así Quedé (sings José Manuel Zamacona)
11. Y Cuando Estés Con Él (Pop Version)
12. Palabras Tristes (2013 Version)

=== Así Te Quiero Yo (1978) ===
1. Soy Yo
2. Pétalo y Espinas
3. Así Te Quiero Yo
4. Pero Te Vas a Arrepentir (feat. Edith Marquez)
5. Palabras Tristes (feat. Mon Laferte)
6. Prefiero Rendirme (feat. Rio Roma)
7. Títere (feat. Alexandra)
8. Si Le Dices Que Sí
9. Un Dolor
10. Le Falta Un Clavo A Mi Cruz
11. Nadie Sabe Lo Que Tiene
12. Gracias
