= Junta, West Virginia =

- Former settlement
- Location within West Virginia
- Coordinates: 37°31′01″N 80°50′18″W
- Country: United States
- State: West Virginia
- County: Summers
- Elevation: 1,509 ft (460 m)
- GNIS feature ID: 1556937

Junta is a former settlement in Summers County, West Virginia, United States. Junta was located on the New River, west of Indian Mills, but no trace of the town remains. Junta appeared on maps as late as 1924.

Junta is a name derived from Spanish.
