= Together (book) =

2005 children's book by Dimitrea Tokunbo

- Author: Dimitrea Tokunbo
- Illustrator: Jennifer Gwynne Oliver
- Language: English
- Publisher: Scholastic Press
- Publication date: 2005
- Publication place: United States

Together (ISBN 0439796547) is a children's book written by Dimitrea Tokunbo and illustrated by Jennifer Gwynne Oliver, published in 2005 by Scholastic Press. An afterword was co-authored by actress Jane Kaczmarek and actor Erik Per Sullivan, who portrayed mother, Lois, and son, Dewey, respectively, on the American situational comedy Malcolm in the Middle.

Produced in conjunction with Heifer International, an American charitable organization dedicated to relieving world hunger by providing to impoverished persons livestock and crops and concomitantly education in sustainable agriculture, the book is directed at young readers and focuses on the importance of domestic animals to peoples across the world and the virtues of eleemosynary and cooperative pursuits.

The book was distributed in 2005 to American schoolchildren to have completed a reading education program—Read to Feed—sponsored by Heifer, Scholastic, and the first spouses of several states of the United States.
