= Together (Jane album) =

Studio album by Jane
- Released: 1972
- Recorded: autumn 1971; Star Musik Studio, Hamburg
- Genre: Progressive rock, Krautrock
- Length: 43:47
- Label: Brain Records, Metronome
- Producer: Günter Körber

Jane chronology
Together (1972)	Here We Are (1973)

Professional ratings
Review scores
Source	Rating
Allmusic	3/5 stars

Together is the first official album by the German progressive rock band, Jane, released in 1972.

== Track listing ==
All songs are written by Klaus Hess, Charly Maucher, Werner Nadolny, Peter Panka and Bernd Pulst.

Side one

1. "Daytime" – 8:10
2. "Wind" – 4:57
3. "Try to Find" – 5:27

Side two

1. "Spain" – 11:57
2. "Together" – 3:46
3. "Hangman" – 9:30

== Personnel ==
- Klaus Hess – lead guitar
- Charly Maucher – bass, vocals
- Werner Nadolny – organ, flute
- Peter Panka – drums, percussion
- Bernd Pulst – vocals
