= Juntos Otra Vez (Los Bukis and Los Yonic's album) =

Compilation album by Los Bukis & Los Yonic's
- Released: 1989
- Genre: Grupero
- Length: 43:24
- Label: Fonovisa

Los Bukis chronology
Si Me Recuerdas (1988)	Juntos Otra Vez (1989)	Lo Romántico de Los Bukis (1989)

Los Yonic's chronology
Siempre Te Amaré (1988)	Juntos Otra Vez (1989)	A Tu Recuerdo (1989)

Juntos Otra Vez ("Together Again") is a compilation album released by Mexican grupero bands Los Bukis and Los Yonic's in 1989.

== Track listing ==
No.	Title	Writer(s)	Length
1.	"Déjame Vivir"	Los Yonic's	3:21
2.	"Tus Mentiras"	Los Bukis	4:46
3.	"Petalo y Espinas"	Los Yonic's	3:26
4.	"Tu Carcel"	Los Bukis	3:30
5.	"Si Tu Quisieras"	Los Yonic's	3:12
6.	"Me Volvi a Acordar de Ti"	Los Bukis	3:27
7.	"Tu Presa Facil"	Los Yonic's	3:58
8.	"Y Ahora Te Vas"	Los Bukis	3:51
9.	"Obligado Por Amor"	Los Yonic's	3:23
10.	"Este Adios"	Los Bukis	3:15
11.	"Perdon Por Tus Lagrimas"	Los Yonic's	3:58
12.	"Que Mala"	Los Bukis	3:17
