= Epitaph (band) =

German rock band

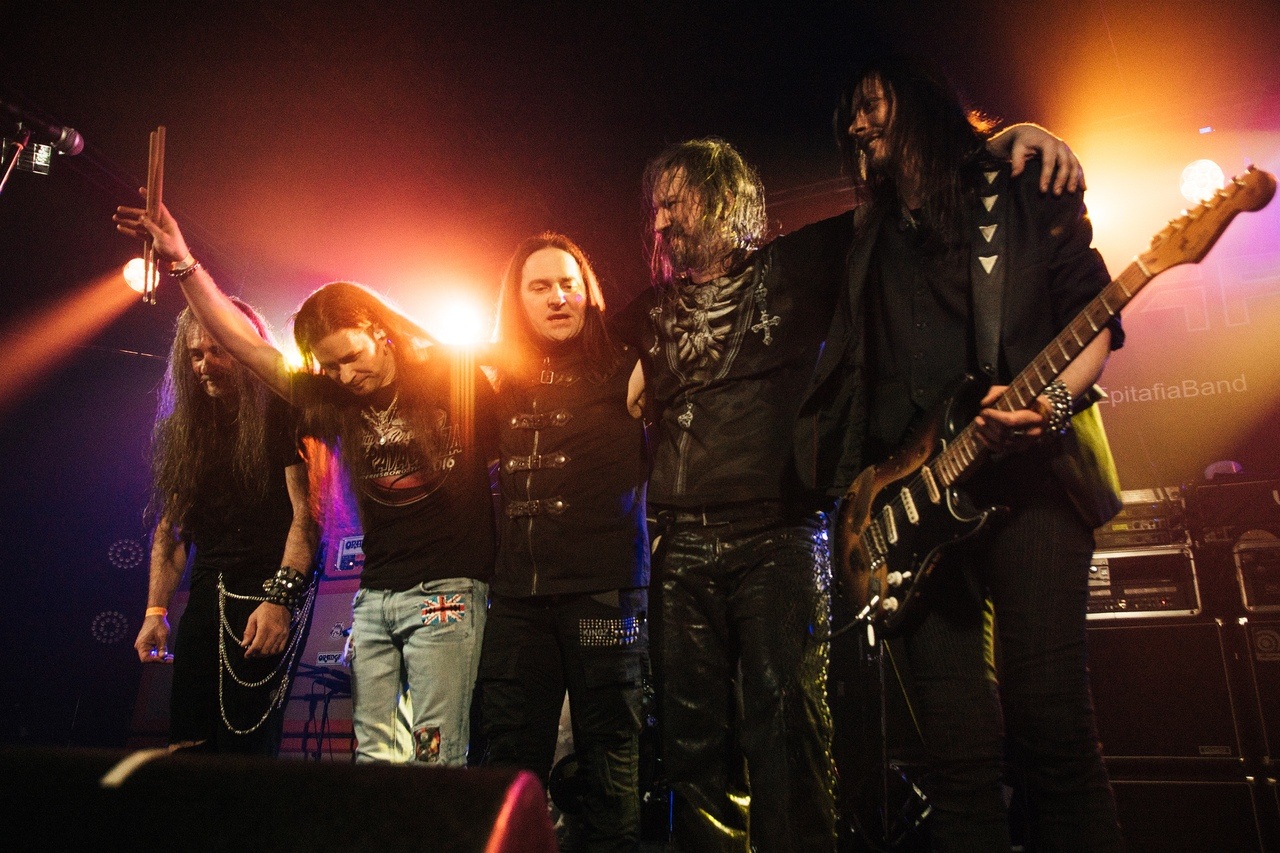

Background information
- Origin: Dortmund, West Germany
- Genres: Progressive rock; hard rock
- Years active: 1969–1982, 2000–present
- Labels: Polydor; Billingsgate; Brain; Rockport; in-akustik
- Members: Cliff Jackson; Fritz Randow; Harvey Janssen; Michael Karch; Heinz Glass
- Past members: Norbert Lehmann; Achim Wielert; Jim McGillivray; Bernd Kolbe; Klaus Walz
- Website: epitaph-band.de

Epitaph is an Anglo-German rock band, formed in Dortmund in 1969. Playing initially what AllMusic described as "post-psych progressive rock, spiced with occasional jazz accents and widespread twin-guitar harmonies", in 1973 they started shifting towards more straightforward hard rock stylings. After releasing six studio albums, they disbanded in 1982. In 2000, Epitaph reunited and several new releases followed.

== History ==
The band was formed (originally as Fagin's Epitaph) in late 1969 in Dortmund, by Yorkshire singer and guitarist Cliff Jackson, Scottish drummer James McGillivray, and German bassist Bernd Kolbe. After several appearances as a support band for such acts as Black Sabbath, Rory Gallagher, Yes and Argent, they signed a record deal with Polydor, shortened their name and moved to Hannover. Having enlisted the second guitarist Klaus Walz, the band travelled to Wessex Studios in London to start recording the eponymous debut album which was finished in Windrose Studios, Hamburg, and released in the autumn of 1971. After numerous gigs throughout Germany including a 1972 live appearance in the TV show Beat Club, the band recorded (in Audio Tonstudio, Berlin) the sophomore, Stop, Look and Listen, again for Polydor. Both releases were described by Allmusic as "post-psych progressive rock, spiced with occasional jazz accents and widespread twin-guitar harmonies."

In 1972, McGillivray left and was replaced by Achim Wielert whose style of playing accounted for the band taking a stronger rock direction, showcased by the two 1973 singles, "Autumn '71" and "We Love You Alice". Still, the sales were disappointing and Polydor dropped the band. Almost instantly Epitaph travelled to the USA and signed there to the newly formed independent Billingsgate record label whose boss Gary Pollack went on to produce the third (and their strongest, according to Allmusic) album, Outside the Law. The band (now with Norbert Lehmann, ex-Karthago, on drums) was ready to embark upon a US tour when Billingsgate went broke. Having lost all their money, Epitaph disbanded in January 1975, so as to avoid sharing their record company's debts.

In 1976 they re-surfaced in Germany (with the line-up of Cliff Jackson, Bernd Kolbe, Klaus Walz and Jim McGillivray) and recorded a gig in Cologne for the musical TV show Rockpalast. Shortly before the recording, in January 1977, McGillivray left the band (he joined Eloy in 1980) and was replaced by Fritz Randow (ex-Eloy). Later that year Walz and Kolbe departed, while guitarist Heinz Glass, bass guitarist Harvey Janssen and Michael Karch on keyboards, came in. This new line-up then joined the Hungarian progressive rock band Omega on the latter's 36-date European tour, which culminated in three major concerts in Budapest, before the audiences of over 30,000.

Epitaph's fourth album Return to Reality was released by Brain Records in April 1979. A boogie rock record, marked by heavy metal influences, it was described as "mediocre" and was poorly received. See You in Alaska followed, again for the Brain label and stylistically in the same vein. Later that year Epitaph toured Germany with Uli Roth and Accept. After Karch's departure the band continued without keyboards. In 1981 Live came out, recorded in Wertheim, Dallau and Triburg, in the course of the See You in Alaska tour. Later that year Waltz and Kolbe returned, and Norbert Lehmann replaced Fritz Randow. This new line-up recorded Danger Man for the small Rockport record label. "Better than the Brain albums," it was still "unable to recapture the spirit of the past times," according to the reviewer Alex Gitlin.

In 1982 Epitaph appeared at the Pfingst Festival in Würzburg and Munich, on the bill that featured ZZ Top, Saxon, Joan Jett and The Blackhearts, Extrabreit, Saga and Spliff. In 1983 they disbanded, but briefly returned in 1986 to support Grobschnitt at their 15th anniversary concert at the Stadthalle Hagen. This resulted in the birth of the band Kingdom (led by Kolbe and Jackson) which then changed its name to Domain, and released three studio albums. Randow joined Victory, then Sinner and later Saxon.

=== Post-reunion ===
In 1999, guitarist Heinz Glass invited members of Epitaph to take part in a concert in Kaiserslautern venue Kammgarn, celebrating the 25th anniversary of his professional career. This led (apparently at the instigation of Rudolf Schenker) to Epitaph's reunion concert in January 2000 at the Lindenbrauerei in Unna. Featuring Cliff Jackson, Heinz Glass, Bernd Kolbe and Achim Wielert in the line-up, it was documented on DVD as Live at the Brewery and later released on CD as Resurrection, by Hurricane Records. In 2007 the band (Jackson, Kolbe, Heinz Glass and Achim Poret) released their seventh studio album Remember the Daze to be followed by Dancing with Ghost (2009), both on in-akustik label.

== Discography ==
- Epitaph (1971, Polydor)
- Stop, Look and Listen (1972, Polydor)
- Outside the Law (1974, Billingsgate)
- Handicap (2LP, 1979, Babylon) (compilation)
- Return to Reality (1979, Brain 60.185)
- See You in Alaska (1980, Brain 60.274)
- Live (1981, Brain 60.385)
- Danger Man (1982, Rockport)
- Remember the Daze (2007, in-akustik)
- Dancing with Ghosts (2009, in-akustik)
- Fire from the Soul (2016)
- Long Ago Tomorrow (2019)
- Don't Let the Gray Hair Fool You (2024)
